= List of awards and nominations received by Amy Schumer =

List of Amy Schumer awards
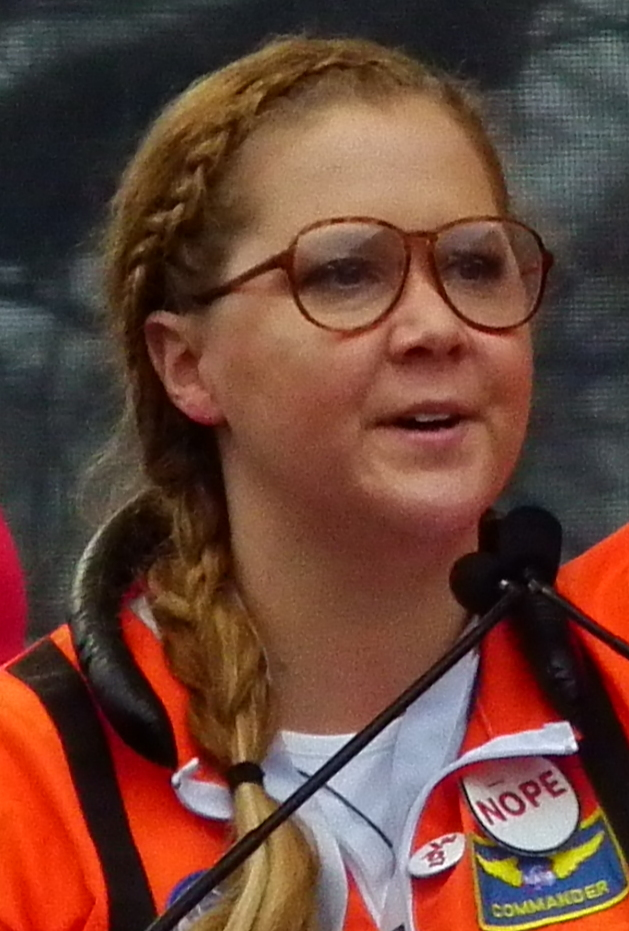
- Schumer in 2017
Award	Wins	Nominations
Golden Globe Awards	0	2
Grammy Awards	0	2
Primetime Emmy Awards	1	13
Tony Awards	0	1

The following is a list of awards and nominations received by American actress and comedian Amy Schumer. Schumer is known for her performances in film, television and theatre, and for her comedy albums and specials.

Schumer has received thirteen Primetime Emmy Award nominations, winning in 2015 for Outstanding Variety Sketch Series for Inside Amy Schumer. For her film work, she received a Golden Globe Award for Best Actress – Motion Picture Comedy or Musical nomination for her performance in the Judd Apatow comedy Trainwreck (2015). In 2017, she earned two Grammy Award nominations for Best Comedy Album for Amy Schumer: Live at the Apollo and for Best Spoken Word Album for The Girl with the Lower Back Tattoo. For her work on stage, she earned a Tony Award for Best Actress in a Play nomination for her role in Steve Martin's comedic play Meteor Shower in 2018.

== Major associations ==
=== Emmy Awards ===
Year	Category	Nominated work	Result	Ref.
Primetime Emmy Awards
2014	Outstanding Writing for a Variety Series	Inside Amy Schumer	Nominated	
2015	Outstanding Variety Sketch Series	Inside Amy Schumer	Won	
2015	Outstanding Lead Actress in a Comedy Series	Inside Amy Schumer	Nominated	
2015	Outstanding Directing for a Variety Series	Inside Amy Schumer	Nominated	
2015	Outstanding Writing for a Variety Series	Inside Amy Schumer	Nominated	
2016	Outstanding Lead Actress in a Comedy Series	Inside Amy Schumer	Nominated	
2016	Outstanding Writing for a Variety Series	Inside Amy Schumer	Nominated	
2016	Outstanding Variety Sketch Series	Inside Amy Schumer	Nominated	
2016	Outstanding Writing for a Variety Special	Amy Schumer: Live at the Apollo	Nominated	
2016	Outstanding Variety Special	Amy Schumer: Live at the Apollo	Nominated	
2016	Outstanding Guest Actress in a Comedy Series	Saturday Night Live	Nominated	
2019	Outstanding Writing for a Variety Special	Amy Schumer: Growing	Nominated	
2020	Outstanding Unstructured Reality Program	Amy Schumer Learns to Cook	Nominated	

=== Golden Globe Awards ===
Year	Category	Nominated work	Result	Ref.
2015	Best Actress – Motion Picture Comedy or Musical	Trainwreck	Nominated	
2024	Best Performance in Stand-Up Comedy on Television	Amy Schumer: Emergency Contact	Nominated	

=== Grammy Awards ===
Year	Category	Nominated work	Result	Ref.
2017	Best Comedy Album	Amy Schumer: Live at the Apollo	Nominated	
2017	Best Spoken Word Album	The Girl with the Lower Back Tattoo	Nominated	

=== Tony Awards ===
Year	Category	Nominated work	Result	Ref.
2017	Best Actress in a Play	Meteor Shower	Nominated	

== Miscellaneous awards ==
Year	Award	Category	Work	Result	Ref(s)
2014	American Comedy Award	Best Comedy Actress – TV	Inside Amy Schumer	Nominated	
2014	Critics' Choice Television Award	Best Actress in a Comedy Series	Inside Amy Schumer	Nominated	
2014	GALECA Dorian Award	Wilde Wit of the Year		Nominated	
2014	Peabody Award		Inside Amy Schumer	Won	
2015	People's Choice Award	Favorite Sketch Comedy TV Show	Inside Amy Schumer	Nominated	
2015	Writers Guild of America Award	Comedy/Variety (Including Talk) – Series	Inside Amy Schumer	Nominated	
2015	Critics' Choice Television Award	Best Actress in a Comedy Series	Inside Amy Schumer	Won	
2015	Television Critics Association Award	Outstanding Achievement in Comedy	Inside Amy Schumer	Won	
2015	Television Critics Association Award	Individual Achievement in Comedy	Inside Amy Schumer	Won	
2015	Teen Choice Award	Choice Comedian	Inside Amy Schumer	Nominated	
2015	Britannia Awards	Charlie Chaplin Britannia Award for Excellence in Comedy		Won	
2016	Washington D.C. Area Film Critics Association	Best Original Screenplay	Trainwreck	Nominated	
2016	People's Choice Award	Favorite Comedic Movie Actress	Trainwreck	Nominated	
2016	Chicago Film Critics Association	Most Promising Performer	Trainwreck	Nominated	
2016	Critics' Choice Movie Award	Best Actress in a Comedy	Trainwreck	Won	
2016	Critics' Choice Movie Award	MVP Award	Trainwreck	Won	
2016	Writers Guild of America Award	Best Original Screenplay	Trainwreck	Nominated	
2016	Writers Guild of America Award	Best Comedy/Variety – Sketch Series	Inside Amy Schumer	Won	
2016	Writers Guild of America Award	Best Comedy/Variety (Music, Awards, Tributes) – Specials	Amy Schumer: Live at the Apollo	Nominated	
2016	GALECA Dorian Award	Wilde Wit of the Year		Won	
2016	Billboard Touring Awards	Top Comedy Tour		Nominated	
2018	MTV Movie & TV Awards	Best Comedic Performance	I Feel Pretty	Nominated	
2022	Just For Laughs	Comedy Person of the Year		Won	
2024	Kids Choice Awards	Favorite Villain (Note: Voice only)	Trolls Band Together	Nominated	
2025	Golden Raspberry Awards	Worst Supporting Actress	Unfrosted	Won	
2025	Golden Raspberry Awards	Worst Screen Combo (Note: Nominated as "Any two unfunny "comedic" actors")	Unfrosted	Nominated	
