= Kevin Kane (actor) =

American actor

- Born: Kevin Kane Jr. Philadelphia, Pennsylvania, U.S
- Occupations: Actor; director; producer
- Years active: 2000–present
- Spouse: Francis Benhamou (m. 2017)

Kevin Kane is an American actor, director and producer.

== Life and career ==
Kane was born in Philadelphia, Pennsylvania. After graduating from Myrtle Beach High School in 1994, he went on to graduate from Coastal Carolina University in 1998. and later the William Esper Studio in New York City. Kane made his screen debut appearing in a small part in the 2000 drama film, Swimming and later made guest appearances on Law & Order, One Life to Live and Law & Order: Special Victims Unit. He is one of founding members of The Collective NY, a New York-based stage production company. With one of the members, Amy Schumer, Kane produced the Comedy Central sketch comedy series, Inside Amy Schumer from 2013 to 2022, receiving Primetime Emmy Award for Outstanding Scripted Variety Series in 2015. He also made 20-episodes recurring appearance on Inside Amy Schumer playing various roles and directed two episodes during the final season. Kane also appeared opposite Schumer in her 2015 romantic comedy film, Trainwreck.

Kane produced Amy Schumer: Live at the Apollo (2015), Amy Schumer: The Leather Special (2017), Snatched (2017), I Feel Pretty (2018), Amy Schumer: Growing (2019), Expecting Amy (2020), and Life & Beth (2022–2024). On Life & Beth, Kane appeared in a recurring role as Matt, Beth's boyfriend, and directed several episodes.

Kane appeared in films The Rainbow Experiment (2018), Lez Bomb (2018) and The Irishman (2019). On television, he guest-starred on White Collar, Blue Bloods, No Activity and FBI: Most Wanted. He had the recurring roles on Chicago P.D. in 2016, and Bonding in 2018. He played four different guest-starring roles on Law & Order: Special Victims Unit, before was cast as Detective Terry Bruno for season 24 and season 25. In July 2024, it was announced that Kane would be promoted to series regular for the show's 26th season.

== Filmography ==
=== Film ===
| Year | Title | Role | Notes |
|---|---|---|---|
| 2000 | Swimming | Jake | Uncredited |
| 2005 | How I Got Lost | Jake | Short film |
| 2009 | My Mother's Fairy Tales | Sebastian | |
| 2011 | A Long Road | O'Connor | Short film |
| 2011 | I'm Not Me | Andy Thomas | |
| 2013 | A Song Still Inside | Sean | |
| 2013 | Tiger Lily Road | Delivery Guy | |
| 2013 | In the Dark | Adam | Short film |
| 2015 | Trainwreck | Kevin | |
| 2017 | Snatched | Hot Guy | Also associate producer |
| 2017 | Quick Fix | Scotty | Short film |
| 2018 | Uncle Silas | Silas | Short film |
| 2018 | The Rainbow Experiment | David McKenna | |
| 2018 | I Feel Pretty | Cute Guy at Pharmacy | Also executive producer |
| 2018 | Lez Bomb | Chino | |
| 2018 | This Teacher | Darren | |
| 2018 | Directions | James | Short film |
| 2019 | The Irishman | FBI Agent | |
| 2020 | Hung Up | Travis | Short film |
| 2024 | Caper | Mitch | |
| 2025 | Kinda Pregnant | | Executive producer |

=== Television ===
| Year | Title | Role | Notes |
|---|---|---|---|
| 2002, 2005 & 2025–2026 | Law & Order | Matt Preminger/Uni/Detective Terry Bruno | Episodes: "Access Nation"/"House of Cards"/"Play with Fire Part 1"/"Snowflakes (Part 1)" |
| 2006 | One Life to Live | Reg | 3 episodes |
| 2008 | Law & Order: Special Victims Unit | Scott Ryland | Episode: "Inconceivable" |
| 2011 | White Collar | Fake Neal | Episode: "On Guard" |
| 2012 | Law & Order: Special Victims Unit | Officer Greg Wilcox | Episode: "Child's Welfare" |
| 2013–2022 | Inside Amy Schumer | Various roles | 20 episodes Also producer, 40 episodes Primetime Emmy Award for Outstanding Scripted Variety Series (2015); Nominated - Primetime Emmy Award for Outstanding Scripted Variety Series (2016) |
| 2014 | Blue Bloods | Officer Bill Becker | Episode: "Above and Beyond" |
| 2015 | Amy Schumer: Live at the Apollo | | Producer; Nominated - Primetime Emmy Award for Outstanding Variety Special (Pre-Recorded) |
| 2016 | Amy Schumer Presents Rachel Feinstein: Only Whores Wear Purple | | Producer |
| 2016 | Law & Order: Special Victims Unit | Major Bowman | Episode: "Nationwide Manhunt" |
| 2016 | Chicago P.D. | Mike Sorensen | 3 episodes |
| 2017 | Amy Schumer: The Leather Special | | Producer |
| 2017 | Amy Schumer Presents Mark Normand: Don't Be Yourself | | Producer |
| 2018 | Amy Schumer Presents Sam Morril: Positive Influence | | Producer |
| 2018 | Law & Order: Special Victims Unit | Gary Kent | Episode: "Mea Culpa" |
| 2018 | Bonding | Professor Charles | 5 episodes |
| 2019 | No Activity | Joseph Farrell | Episode: "Tooth and Nail" |
| 2019 | Amy Schumer: Growing | | Producer |
| 2020 | Expecting Amy | | Executive producer |
| 2021 | FBI: Most Wanted | Brendan De Rossi | Episode: "Spiderwebs" |
| 2022–2024 | Life & Beth | Matt | Recurring role Also executive producer |
| 2023–present | Law & Order: Special Victims Unit | Detective Terry Bruno | Recurring role; seasons 24 & 25, Main role; season 26 |
