= 2015 Lafayette shooting =

Mass shooting in Louisiana, U.S.

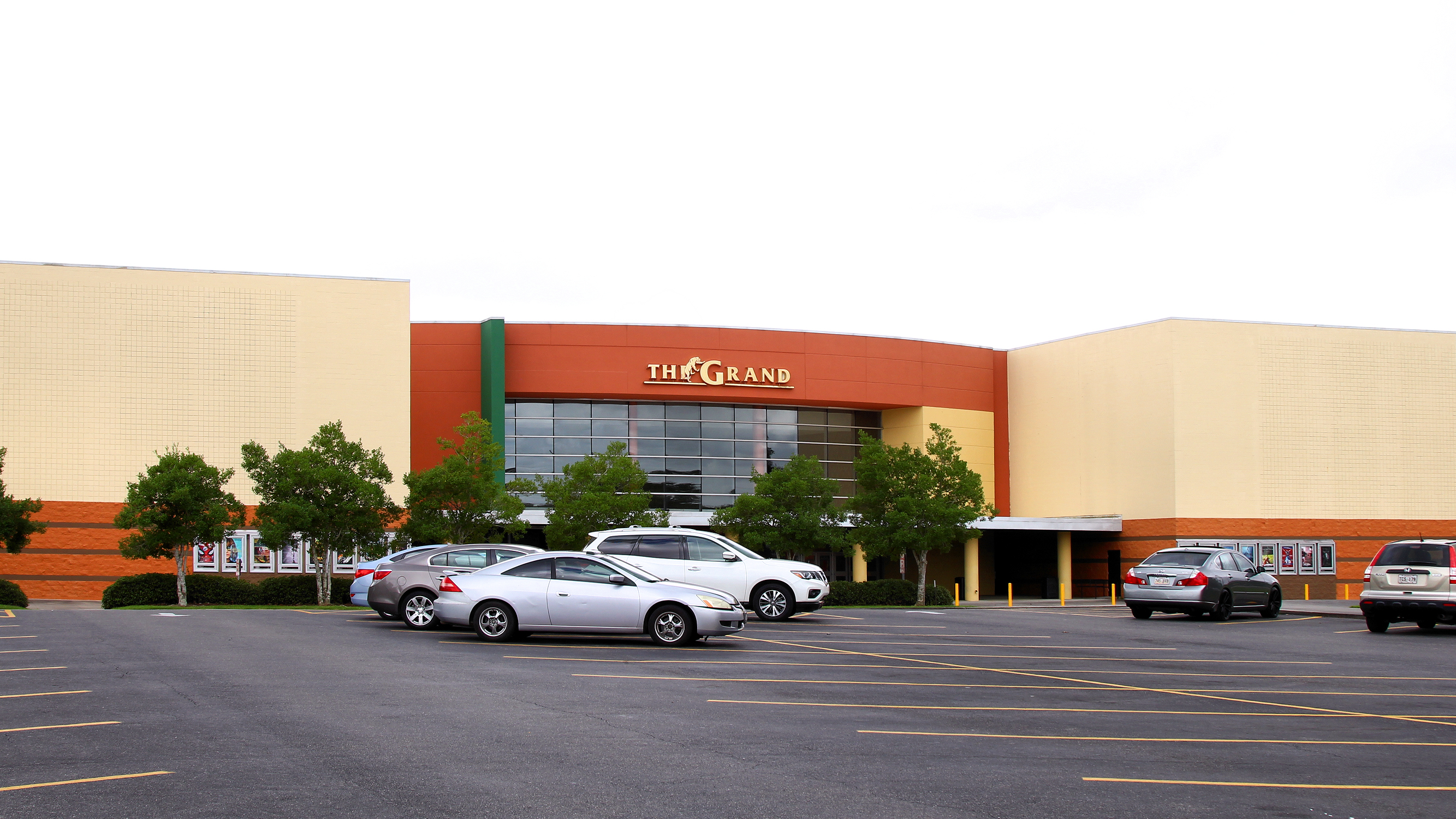
- The Grand 16 Theatre
- Location: 30.20199°N 92.04584°W; 3141 Johnston Street, Lafayette, Louisiana, U.S.
- Date: July 23, 2015; 11 years ago 7:27 p.m. (CDT)
- Attack type: Mass shooting, murder–suicide
- Weapon: .40 caliber Hi-Point Model JCP semi-automatic pistol
- Deaths: 3 (including the perpetrator)
- Injuries: 9
- Perpetrator: John Russell Houser
- Motive: Inconclusive

On July 23, 2015, a mass shooting occurred at the Grand 16 movie theater in Lafayette, Louisiana, United States. Fifty-nine-year-old John Russell Houser opened fire during a showing of the film Trainwreck, killing two people and injuring nine others before taking his own life.

== Shooting ==
The shooting occurred in theater 14 during the 7:10 p.m. screening of Trainwreck, held at the Grand 16 movie theater in Lafayette. John Russell Houser, 59, went to the theater alone, bought a ticket ten minutes late into the movie, and sat for several minutes in the theater's second-to-last row. Along with Houser, there were 25 people in the theater and 300 people in the building. He was armed with a Hi-Point Model JCP .40-caliber handgun and equipped with two 10-round magazines. Shortly before 7:30 p.m., Houser stood up, pulled out the handgun from his pants, and started shooting indiscriminately while walking down the steps. He fired at least 13 rounds and reloaded once. He killed two people and injured nine others.

The first two people Houser shot were sitting directly in front of him. The shooting was contained to one theater. After the shooting ended, Houser exited the theater through a side door and apparently tried to head for his vehicle while blending in with survivors. However, upon noticing police sirens, he retreated inside the building and fired three more shots at fleeing moviegoers before committing suicide.

Four officers responded to the scene in less than a minute after receiving a 7:28 p.m. report of the shooting. After witnessing audiences fleeing and hearing gunshots, they made their way into the auditorium. Upon entering the theater, two-and-a-half minutes after arrival, they found Houser dead; he had fatally shot himself in the mouth. His body remained inside the theater for several hours. After the shooting, it was discovered that he had a blood alcohol level of 0.1, while the legal limit to drive is 0.08.

Following the shooting, the other local Grand Theatre was also closed, while the entire area was locked down as law enforcement officials searched for additional shooters.

== Victims ==
Two women were killed by Houser in the shooting. One died at the scene, while the other died at a nearby hospital. They are:

- Mayci Breaux, age 21, of Franklin, Louisiana, who died at the theater. She was a student at Louisiana State University Eunice and worked at the Coco Eros boutique. She died from a single gunshot wound. She was accompanied at the theater by her boyfriend, Matthew Rodriguez, who was injured in the neck and in the armpit.
- Jillian Johnson, age 33, of Lafayette, who died at the hospital. A visual and musical artist, she designed T-shirts, operated a gift and toy shop in Lafayette, and played ukulele and guitar for a band called The Figs. She died from two gunshot wounds. She was accompanied at the theater by her friend Julia Egedahl, who was injured in the torso and suffered serious fractures.

The injuries of the survivors ranged from light to critical and were inflicted either from gunshots and/or during accidents while fleeing. The victims' ages ranged from the late teens to their 60s. Among the injured were the cousin of Louisiana Representative Charles Boustany and her husband. Egedahl, who had been shot seven times, was the last victim discharged, and left Our Lady of Lourdes Regional Medical Center on August 14. One victim was shot four times.

== Investigation ==
The Louisiana State Police, the Federal Bureau of Investigation (FBI), the Bureau of Alcohol, Tobacco, Firearms, and Explosives (ATF), the Lafayette Parish Sheriff, and Lafayette Police Department police participated in the investigation. Police believe the shooter acted alone, but have not confirmed a motive.

Upon investigation, officials found that Houser had been staying in a nearby motel, part of the Motel 6 chain, and discovered wigs, glasses, and disguises. This led officials to believe that he intended on escaping before being cornered by police, leading to his suicide. Furthermore, he illegally switched his license plates near an exit door to the theater, and in his motel room.

On late Thursday night, the police investigated Houser's car, a blue 1995 Lincoln Town Car, and found two suspicious objects with wires inside. Fearing that the items might be an explosive, the police halted the investigation. On the morning of July 24, they called the bomb squad, who blew up its windows and trunk. Similarly, investigators found three objects in the theater that they feared could be explosives and had them examined with a robot. An apartment complex behind the theater was evacuated as a precaution. The objects in the theater and in the car all turned out not to be dangerous. A search of the car later turned up more disguises.

Investigators recovered a 39-page journal belonging to Houser, which contained the name of the theater and the time and date of the screening of Trainwreck, along with random notes and observations. However, the journal did not provide a clear motive behind the shooting. Investigators were also studying posts he made online to determine a motive for the shooting. They finished processing the crime scene at the theater on July 27.

Questions were raised about how Houser was able to obtain the gun used in the shooting. It was initially reported that he had been involuntarily committed for mental health treatment in 2008, which would have legally prohibited him from purchasing firearms. However, it was later determined that he was able to purchase the gun because a judge never committed him and instead had him undergo a mental health evaluation. Once the evaluation was done, medical authorities either had to release him, convince him to commit himself voluntarily for treatment, or petition a court to force him to undergo treatment. They never petitioned the court, but it was unclear if Houser was released or voluntarily committed. His 2008 evaluation was never officially reported to the Georgia Bureau of Investigation.

The Grand 16 theater was shut down after the shooting. It reopened four months later on November 19, after a ceremony honoring the victims.

On January 13, 2016, police released a 589-page report of the shooting and photos of Houser's motel room.

== Perpetrator ==
The perpetrator, John Russell "Rusty" Houser, was born on November 22, 1955, and raised in Columbus, Georgia, according to law enforcement. He had a history of anti-government and far-right views, including those on race, gender, and the future of the U.S.

Houser, who had been estranged from his family, was described as a wayfarer and a drifter. According to law enforcement, he graduated from Columbus High School in 1973, Columbus State University in 1988, and Columbus Technical College. According to an online LinkedIn account belonging to him, he also attended Faulkner University. He owned a number of bars in Georgia. He once attended law school but dropped out. His last recorded residence was in Phenix City, Alabama, where he purchased his firearm at the Money Miser Northside Pawn shop on U.S. Route 280 in February 2014.

In 2006, he tried to get a concealed carry permit, but he was denied it due to his 1989 arson arrest in Columbus and a domestic violence complaint filed by his wife in Phenix City on October 23, 2005. Houser had business ties to LaGrange, Georgia in the late-1990s. He was convicted five different times between 1999 and April 2001 for selling alcohol to minors connected to his business in the city revokes Houser's liquor license for Rusty' Buckhead Pub after his fifth conviction in a year for selling alcohol to minors. In response, Houser hung a flag with a swastika approximately the size of a bed sheet on the building where the pub operated, according to a local law enforcement official. The Columbus Police Department arrest records show that Houser was arrested three years beforehand for theft by taking for stealing his opponents campaign signs while running for tax commissioner in 1996.

Shortly after birth, at 7 months old, Houser set a citywide record on June 23, 1956, for the youngest child ever to be placed in a traction cast at Columbus City Hospital after his grandmother accidentally slipped on a throw-rug while carrying Houser in their Columbus home near Columbus State University, injuring both Houser and his grandmother. On December 3, 1983, Houser married Kellie Maddox, a resident of Carrollton, Georgia. They settled in Carrollton for some time. In August 1989, Houser received his first arrest on an arson charge for trying to hire a man to burn down the office of a lawyer who represented adult movie theaters, but a Columbus area judge ordered a mental evaluation for Houser on September 25 of that same year.

Houser had a history of making dozens of call-in appearances on local television talk shows in the Columbus market, with almost the entirety of his calls being on the local weekday morning call-in program Rise and Shine on NBC affiliate WLTZ-TV in the 1990s. Calvin Floyd, the former host of the show, replied that Houser was "radical", and his role was limited to call-ins and occasional debates on an estimate 15-to-20 episodes. His role provokes callers by advocating violence against abortion providers as well as a fight over him against the city's water department.

=== Mental health issues ===
Houser was said to have mental health issues, for which he was treated in 2008 and 2009. In 2008, he underwent a mental health evaluation. According to his wife, he suffered from bipolar disorder.

He also had some previous arrest and complaint records including arson, domestic violence, stalking, and selling alcohol to a minor, although these records were at least a decade old. On April 22, 2008, his wife and daughter, along with his daughter's then-fiancé and his parents, issued a protective order against him during his mental health evaluation. The order cited his violent and erratic behavior and reasoned that he had tried to stop his daughter and her fiancé from marrying. Houser's wife also hid his guns away from him for protection. After the order was issued, his family members apparently ceased contact with him. Following the conclusion, Houser is involuntarily committed to West Central Regional Hospital in Columbus.

On May 5, 2014, when faced with the threat of eviction from his home in Alabama, Houser booby-trapped the house by twisting out and igniting the gas starter tube in the fireplace, after removing the logs, in an attempt to make the house catch on fire. On March 31, 2015, a week after his wife filed for divorce on March 23, Houser called her and threatened her, then went to a retirement community where his mother lived. There, he threatened to commit suicide outside if she didn't give him money. The mother called his wife and was urged by her to have him hospitalized. Instead, she gave him $5,000.

=== Behaviour immediately prior to the shooting ===
Houser is said to have entered Louisiana around July 2 or 3 and spent his time exploring the state along Interstate 10, apparently searching for a location to attack. During the week of July 13, he visited a food bank in Lake Charles twice and requested aid from them. He had been at the Grand 16 theater at least once before, and had also visited several other movie theaters in the state. According to witnesses at one theater, he was dressed up to look like a woman and was behaving erratically. He also appeared to have made some getaway plans.

Houser's only known connection to Lafayette was an uncle who once lived there, but died in 1980. It was believed by investigators that he was traveling to Texas and Lafayette was simply a stopping point.

On July 27, The Hollywood Reporter reported that investigators believed he chose to commit the shooting in a theater playing Trainwreck due to its feminist themes and characters, as well as its lead actress's Jewish background. He was said to have been a misogynist and praised the actions of Adolf Hitler on online message boards. An investigation by the SPLC into the shooter's social media posts revealed that he was a supporter of the Greek far-right political party Golden Dawn, former Klansman David Duke, the Westboro Baptist Church, antisemitism, the aforementioned Adolf Hitler and Timothy McVeigh as well as asking on an online forum where he could join white power groups. Additionally, he praised the Charleston church shooter Dylann Roof and stated that he was "green but good" and "But thanks for the wake up call Dylann" as well as expressing homophobic, misogynistic, and racist anti-black sentiments in his journal.

== Responses to the shooting ==
=== Political response ===
- Louisiana Governor Bobby Jindal traveled to the scene of the shooting and said he was praying for the victims. He praised the actions of law enforcement during the shooting.
- U.S. Senators David Vitter and Bill Cassidy of Louisiana both released statements expressing their sorrow for the victims of the shooting, and that they were praying for them.
- Authorities in Louisiana and Alabama criticized the lack of funding for mental health services in the U.S., following the emergence of his mental health problems.
- Louisiana State Representative Barbara Norton stated that she is planning on drafting a bill to the criminal justice committee she serves on, which would require all movie theaters in Louisiana to have a metal detector.

=== Theater and film response ===
Amy Schumer, who wrote and starred in the film being shown as the shooting occurred, posted on her Twitter account, "My heart is broken and all my thoughts and prayers are with everyone in Louisiana." She later joined U.S. Senator Chuck Schumer of New York, a cousin of her father's, in calling for stricter gun control and increased mental health funding. Schumer expanded on the shooting and her views on gun control in her autobiography The Girl with the Lower Back Tattoo, where she talked about the two murder victims at length; she referred to the gunman's personal views and issues without referring to him by name.

Universal Studios, the film's distributor, also released a statement, saying, "All of us at Universal Pictures send our heartfelt sympathies to the victims of this senseless tragedy and their families in Louisiana."

The theater and its parent company, the Southern Theatres, did not immediately respond to a request for comment. Security was increased at the other Grand movie theater in Kenner, Louisiana, and at the Esplanade Mall in Kenner. They later issued a statement, in which they said, "All of us offer our thoughts and prayers to the victims and the community of Lafayette. We are grateful to all local officials and to the governor for their efforts."

== See also ==
- 2012 Aurora, Colorado shooting, another shooting at a theater in Aurora, Colorado during a screening of The Dark Knight Rises.
- Harlem Nights movie theater shooting
- Gun laws in Louisiana
