= Keith Robinson (comedian) =

American comedian

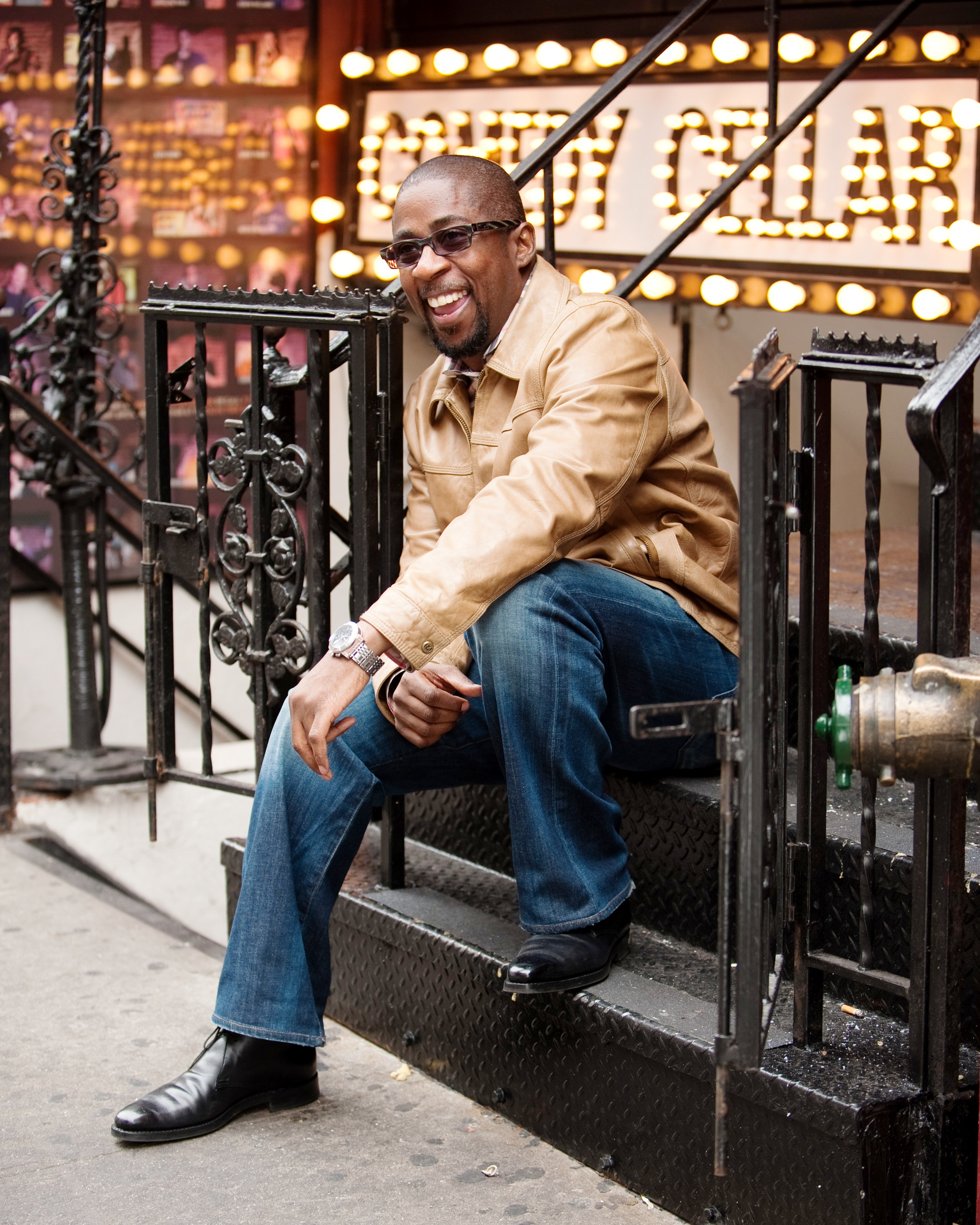
- Keith Robinson promo pic

Comedy career
- Years active: 1985–present
- Medium: Stand-up
- Genres: Cringe humor, black comedy, satire, observational comedy
- Subjects: Dating, men's rights, race relations, political correctness, professional sports

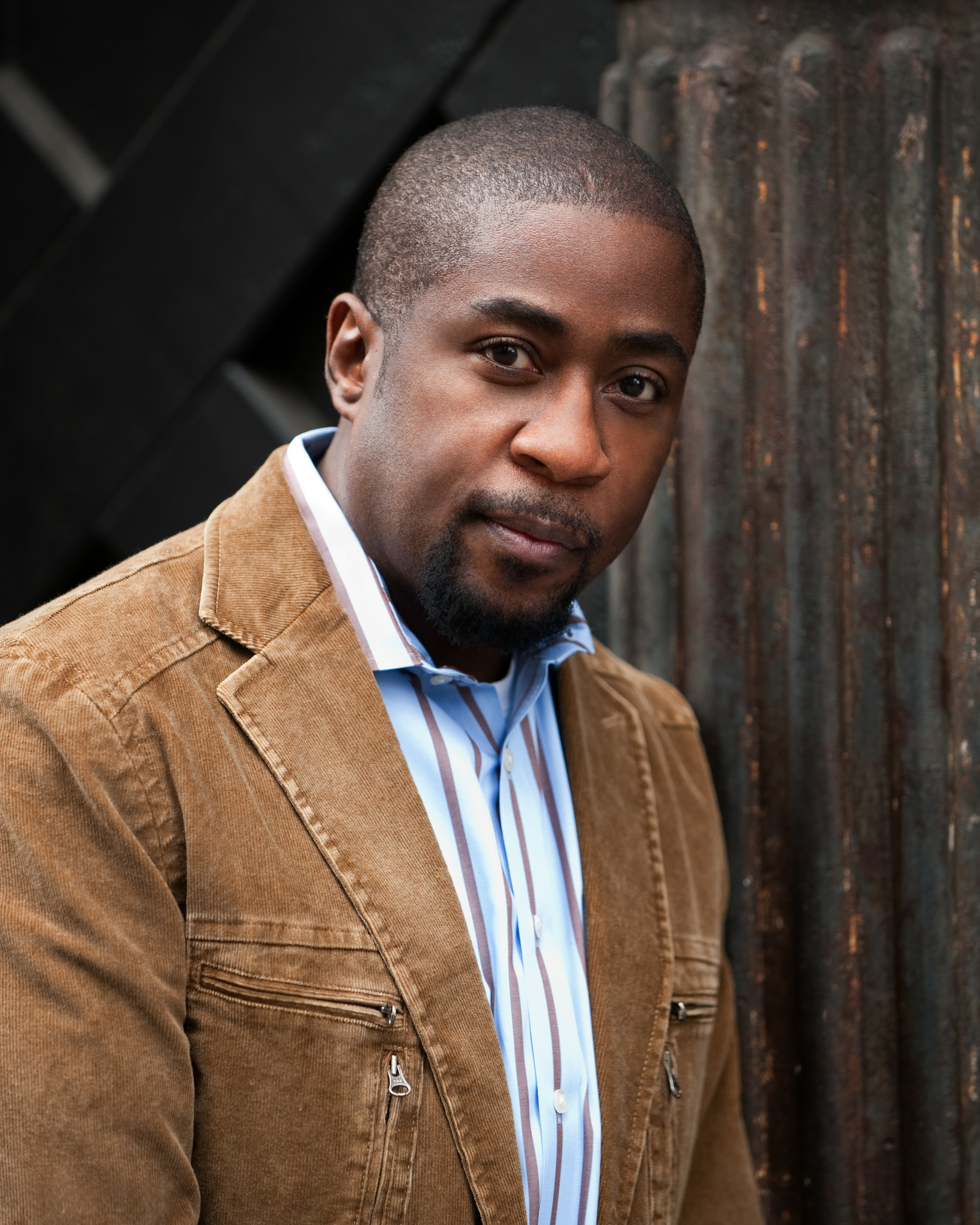
Keith Robinson headshot

Keith Robinson is an American stand-up comedian and comic actor.

== Early life ==
In his teens, Robinson began cultivating his wit with his "back of the bus funny," subsequently working the comedy circuit in Philadelphia, his hometown. In 1993 he competed on Ed McMahon's Star Search, and was a finalist but did not win. He is also very well known for his time with "Comedy Express" a comedy group in the 1980s.

== Stand-up comedy ==
Robinson performs regularly at the Comedy Cellar in Manhattan, frequently as the emcee. He has had his own half-hour stand-up special on Comedy Central. In 2012, Time Out New York named Robinson as one of the "21 New York comedy scene linchpins " He has several stories about his life in Philadelphia and his run-ins with the police.

== Television and film appearances ==
Robinson was the announcer and sidekick on The Wanda Sykes Show. He gained significant exposure as a regular on Comedy Central's Tough Crowd with Colin Quinn. He has appeared on The Chelsea Lately Show on E!, the Opie and Anthony show and NBC's short-lived The Colin Quinn Show.

Some of Robinson's film credits include Rebound: The Legend of Earl "The Goat" Manigault, Diary of a Tired Black Man, Trainwreck and the stand-up comedy film Kevin Hart: Laugh at My Pain. He has also had appearances on MTV, VH1, HBO's Def Comedy Jam, the series Are We There Yet? and Late Night with Conan O'Brien. Robinson has also been credited as a comedic writer, including on the sketch comedy series Chappelle's Show.

In 2014, Robinson released his first one-hour stand-up special Kevin Hart Presents: Keith Robinson - Back of the Bus Funny.

== Podcast ==
Robinson co-hosts the Spotify original podcast Amy Schumer Presents: 3 Girls, 1 Keith with Schumer and her best comedy friends Rachel Feinstein and Bridget Everett which debuted June 21, 2018. They talk about comedy, pop culture, politics and their personal lives.

== Personal life ==
In 2016, Robinson had a stroke which paralyzed one side of his body and slurred his speech yet he continues performing stand-up. He discussed his strokes at length in his 2024 Netflix special Different Strokes.
