= Expecting Amy =

2020 American documentary television miniseries

- Poster
- Genre: Documentary
- Directed by: Alexander Hammer; Ryan Cunningham
- Starring: Amy Schumer; Chris Fischer; Rachel Feinstein; Kevin Kane; Kim Caramele; Bridget Everett
- Original language: English
- No. of episodes: 3

Production
- Executive producer: Amy Schumer
- Editor: Alexander Hammer
- Production company: It's So Easy Productions

Original release
- Network: HBO Max
- Release: July 9, 2020

Expecting Amy is an American documentary television miniseries directed by Alexander Hammer that follows Amy Schumer through her pregnancy and hyperemesis gravidarum, including the creation of her stand-up special Amy Schumer: Growing. Schumer also serves as an executive producer. It premiered on July 9, 2020, on HBO Max.

== Production ==
In October 2019, it was announced Amy Schumer would serve as executive producer and appear with her husband Chris Fischer in a documentary about her pregnancy, life, and career, directed by Alexander Hammer for HBO Max. Bridget Everett, Rachel Feinstein, Kevin Kane and Kim Caramele would also appear.

== Episodes ==
No.	Title	Directed by	Original release date
1	"Conception"	Alexander Hammer	July 9, 2020
2	"Gestation"	Alexander Hammer	July 9, 2020
3	"and Birth"	Alexander Hammer	July 9, 2020
