= Leah Lamarr =

American comedian

- Notable work: Co-host of iHeartMedia's Real-Time Crime podcast; Clubhouse icon; Portraying Rachel Feinstein on Laff Mobb's Laff Tracks

Comedy career
- Years active: 2012–present
- Medium: Stand-up; television; film; radio
- Genres: Blue comedy; musical comedy; character comedy
- Website: leahlamarr.com

Leah Lamarr is an American comedian, actress and podcast host. She is known for being a comedy show host on the Clubhouse app and co-hosting the Real-Time Crime podcast on iHeartMedia.

== Life and career ==
Lamarr struggled as a comedian until she joined Clubhouse in 2020. She moderates Hot on the Mic and Afternoon Delight, one of the app's most popular rooms. Lamarr has hosted rooms with Adele and Oprah, an interview she revealed made her sweat. When asked about how much time she spends on the app, Lamarr admits she has FOMO when not on it. On August 29, 2021, she became the app's official icon.

Lamarr has opened shows for Dane Cook, Bill Burr and Nick Kroll.

After discussing the Gabby Petito case with iHeartMedia CEO Conal Byrne, Lamarr was offered a one-year deal to co-host a true crime podcast called Real-Time Crime.

In 2022, Lamarr's NFTs tour took place in Los Angeles, London and Edinburgh. The tour focused on her past heartbreaks and love moving forward.

== Filmography ==
Format	Year	Title	Role	Notes
Short Film	2019	White Guys Solve Sexism	Nancy	
TV series	2018-2020	Laff Mobb's Laff Tracks	Rachel Feinstein	4 episodes
