= Amy Schumer =

American comedian and actress (born 1981)

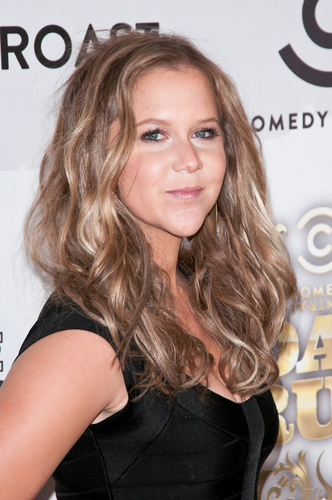
- Schumer in 2011
- Born: Amy Beth Schumer; June 1, 1981 (age 45); New York City, U.S.
- Education: Towson University (BA)
- Political party: Democratic
- Spouse: Chris Fischer (m. 2018; div. 2026)
- Children: 1
- Relatives: Chuck Schumer (first cousin, once removed)

Comedy career
- Years active: 2007–present
- Medium: Stand-up; television; film; theatre
- Genres: Observational comedy; blue comedy; sketch comedy; insult comedy; satire
- Subjects: Interpersonal relationships; sex; everyday life; self-deprecation; current events; pop culture
- Website: amyschumer.com

Amy Beth Schumer (born June 1, 1981) is an American stand-up comedian, actress, writer, producer, and director. She ventured into comedy in the early 2000s before appearing as a contestant on the fifth season of the NBC reality competition series Last Comic Standing in 2007. From 2013 to 2016, Schumer was the creator, co-producer, co-writer, and star of the Comedy Central sketch comedy series Inside Amy Schumer, for which she received a Peabody Award and was nominated for five Primetime Emmy Awards, winning Outstanding Variety Sketch Series in 2015.

Schumer wrote and made her film debut in a starring role in Trainwreck (2015) earning a nomination for the Golden Globe Award for Best Actress – Motion Picture Comedy or Musical. She then starred in the comedy films Snatched (2017), and I Feel Pretty (2019). She created, produced and starred in the HBO documentary series Expecting Amy (2020), and the Hulu comedy-drama series Life & Beth (2022–2024).

She made her Broadway debut in Steve Martin's Meteor Shower for which she earned a Tony Award nomination for Best Actress in a Play. Schumer has earned two Grammy Award nominations for Best Comedy Album for Amy Schumer: Live at the Apollo, and Best Spoken Word Album for narrating her memoir, The Girl with the Lower Back Tattoo (2016).

== Early life and education ==
Schumer was born on June 1, 1981, on the Upper East Side of Manhattan, New York City, to Sandra Jane (née Jones, or Johns) and Gordon David Schumer, who owned a baby furniture company. Schumer's father was born to a Jewish family from Ukraine. She is a first cousin, once removed, of U.S. Senator and Senate Minority Leader Chuck Schumer. Her mother is from a Protestant background and has deep New England roots, and converted to Judaism before her marriage. Schumer was raised Jewish and says she had to deal with antisemitism as a child, but is not observant as an adult. Her mother is of Puritan ancestry dating back to the colonial-era Massachusetts Bay Colony. In 2017, as a guest on Finding Your Roots, Schumer learned that in 1704, three children from her ancestor Thomas Tarbell's family were captured at Groton, Massachusetts, in a French-Abenaki raid and taken to Montreal. The girl was ransomed by a French-Canadian family and ultimately joined a French Catholic convent; the two boys were each adopted by Mohawk families at Kahnawake and became thoroughly assimilated. They married Mohawk women and some of their descendants became chiefs. There are still Mohawk by the surname Tarbell in Kahnawake and Akwesasne, another village reserve on the St. Lawrence River founded by the brothers.

Through the success of her father's furniture company in Manhattan, Schumer's household was wealthy during her early years. When she was nine years old her father's business failed and he went bankrupt. He was subsequently diagnosed with multiple sclerosis. Her parents divorced when she was 12.

Schumer moved to Long Island with her mother and lived in Rockville Centre where she attended South Side High School. She was voted both "Class Clown" and "Teacher's Worst Nightmare" upon graduation in 1999.

She attended the Hebrew school of the Central Synagogue of Nassau County, a Reform synagogue in Rockville Centre, where her mother served on the school's board.

After graduating from high school, Schumer attended Towson University in Towson, Maryland, where she graduated with a degree in theater in 2003. After graduating from college, she returned to New York City, where she studied at the William Esper Studio for two years and worked as a bartender and a waitress. She also lived with her boyfriend in Santa Barbara, California, where she worked as a pedicab driver. She has a younger sister, Kim Caramele, who is a comedy writer and a producer, and a half-brother, Jason Stein, who is a musician in Chicago, Illinois.

== Career ==
=== 2003–2012: actress ===
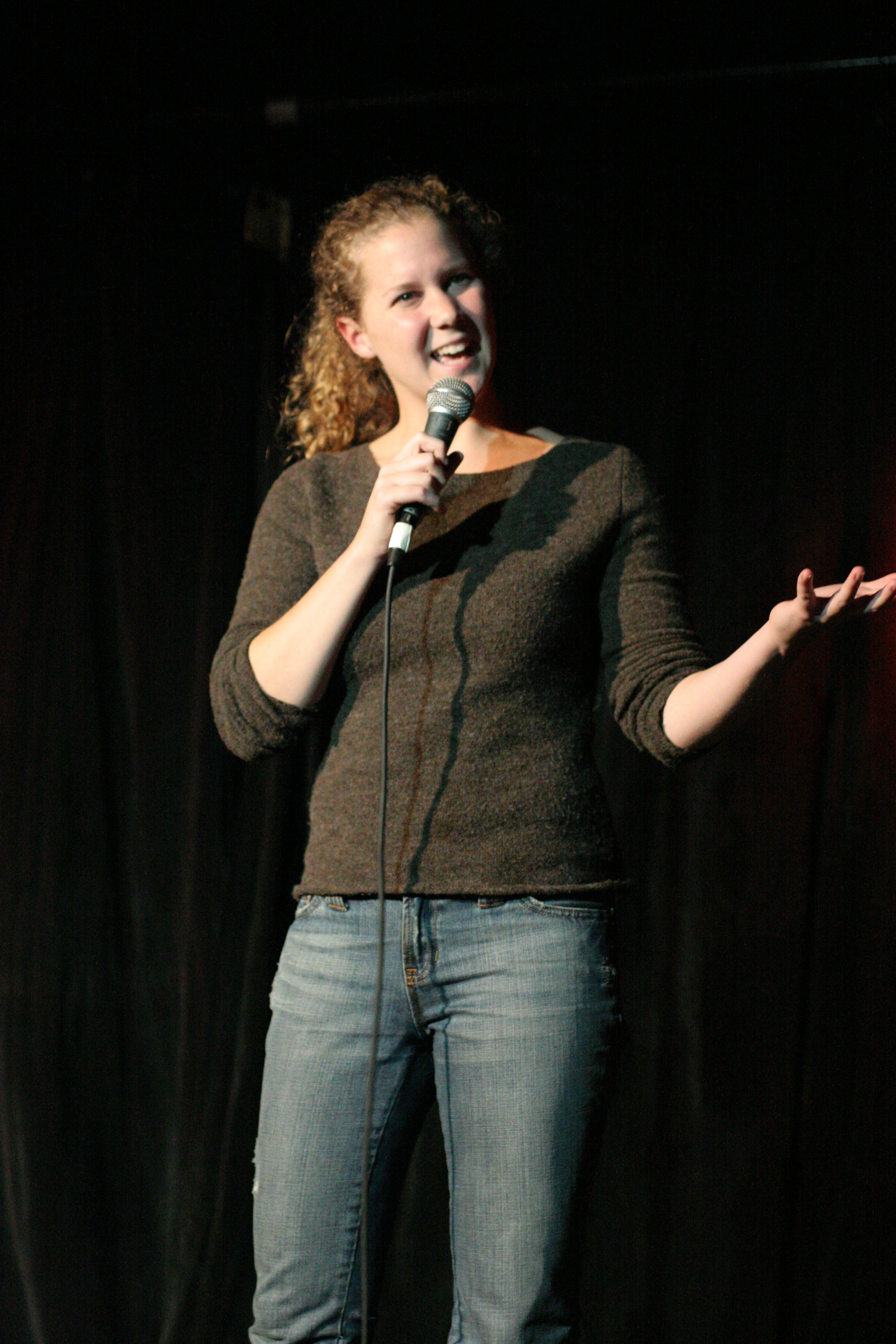
Schumer performing in 2006

After graduating with a degree in theater from Towson University in 2003 and moving to New York City, Schumer portrayed a young woman diagnosed with breast cancer in the Off-Off-Broadway black comedy Keeping Abreast. She started doing stand-up comedy on June 1, 2004, when she first performed at Gotham Comedy Club. A few years later, she and Kevin Kane co-founded The Collective, which is a theater group that publishes and performs socially relevant and accessible work.

In 2007, Schumer recorded a Live at Gotham episode for Comedy Central before appearing on Last Comic Standing; she later recalled that she thought of the episode as her "big break". Rebounding from an unsuccessful audition for an earlier season, she advanced to the finals of the fifth season of the NBC reality television talent show Last Comic Standing and placed fourth. Schumer said in April 2011, "Last Comic was totally fun. I had a great time because there was no pressure on me; I had been doing stand-up around two years. I wasn't supposed to do well. So every time I advanced it was a happy surprise. I kept it honest on the show and it served me well."

Schumer co-starred in the Comedy Central reality show Reality Bites Back in 2008. In 2009, she appeared in an advertising campaign for Butterfinger. Schumer was a recurring guest on Fox News late-night program Red Eye w/ Greg Gutfeld between 2007 and 2012. Her first Comedy Central Presents special aired on April 2, 2010. She served as a co-host of A Different Spin with Mark Hoppus in 2011, later titled Hoppus on Music. She has also written for Cosmopolitan. Schumer did an episode (#154) of WTF with Marc Maron podcast on March 3, 2011, in which she discusses her early life in more detail. Schumer has appeared in roles on the NBC comedy series 30 Rock, the Adult Swim mockumentary series Delocated, and the two HBO series, Curb Your Enthusiasm and Girls. She was also a frequent guest on The Howard Stern Show and the Opie and Anthony radio show.

Schumer released a stand-up comedy album, Cutting, in 2011. Her stand-up comedy special Mostly Sex Stuff premiered on Comedy Central on August 18, 2012, to positive reviews. Schumer said in February 2012, "I don't like the observational stuff. I like tackling the stuff nobody else talks about, like the darkest, most serious thing about yourself. I talk about life and sex and personal stories and stuff everybody can relate to, and some can't." She acted in three films in 2012: the independent comedy Price Check, the comedy-drama Seeking a Friend for the End of the World, and the independent comedy Sleepwalk with Me. Schumer also appeared on The Comedy Central Roast of Charlie Sheen in September 2011, and The Comedy Central Roast of Roseanne Barr in August 2012. In June 2012, Schumer began work on a sketch comedy series for Comedy Central. The show included single-camera vignettes of Schumer playing "heightened versions" of herself. The vignettes are linked together with footage of Schumer's stand-up.

=== 2013–2019: Inside Amy Schumer ===
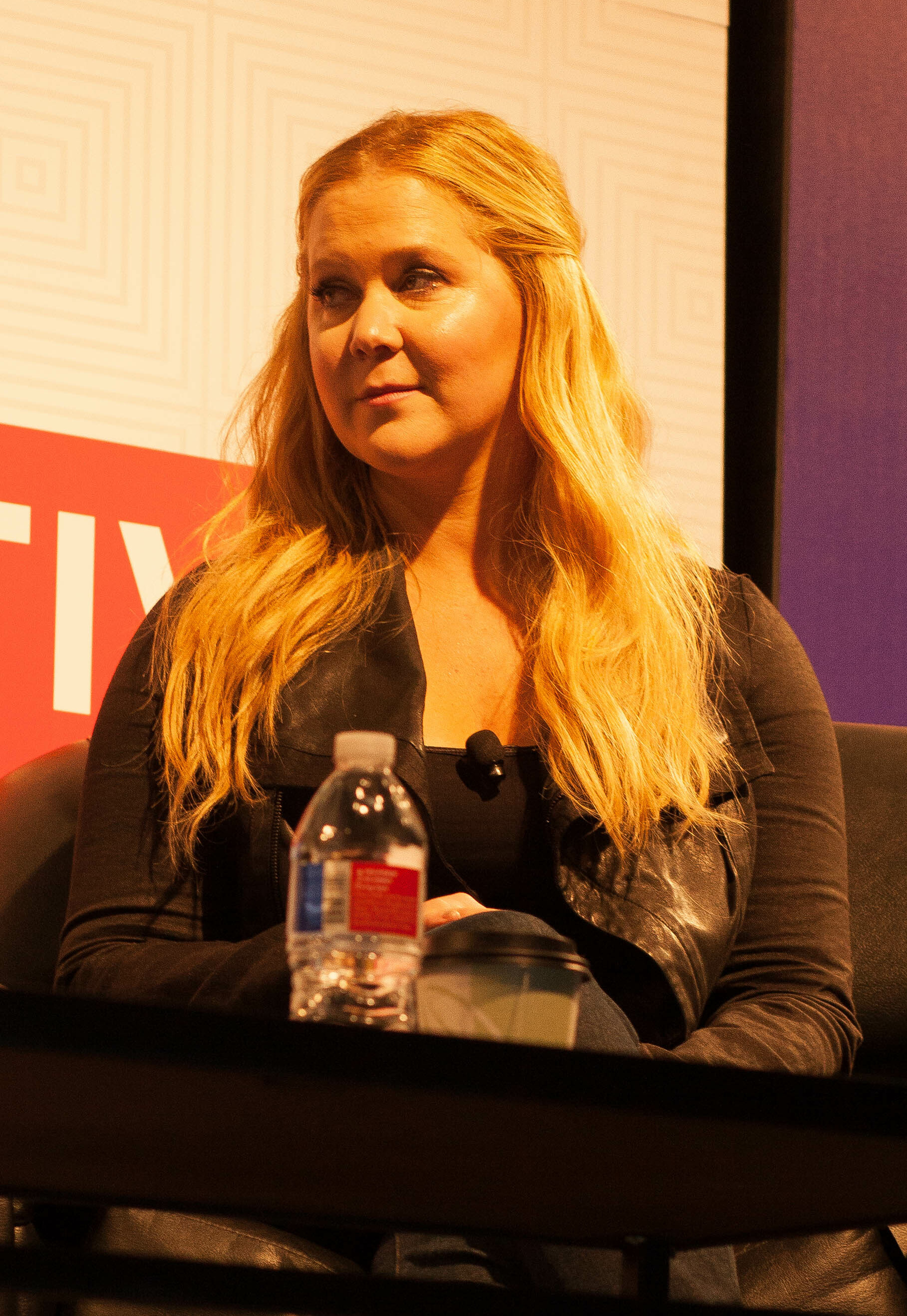
Schumer at South by Southwest in 2015

The TV show Inside Amy Schumer premiered on Comedy Central on April 30, 2013. Inside Amy Schumer was picked up for a second season that began in 2014. A behind-the-scenes miniseries entitled Behind Amy Schumer premiered in 2012. The third season premiered on April 21, 2015, with a fourth season ordered the same day. In 2014, Schumer embarked on her Back Door Tour to promote the second season of her show. The show was closed by Bridget Everett, whom Schumer cites as her favorite live performer. She also appeared as a guest on an episode of comedian Jerry Seinfeld's Internet series Comedians in Cars Getting Coffee in 2014.

She hosted the 2015 MTV Movie Awards, which took place on April 11. Schumer wrote and played her first leading film role in Trainwreck, co-starring Bill Hader, which was released on July 17, 2015. In August 2015, Jennifer Lawrence said she and Schumer planned to co-star in a film for which they and Schumer's sister Kim were co-writing a screenplay. However, Schumer later revealed the project was on the "back burner". Schumer performed as opening act for Madonna on three New York City dates of the singer's Rebel Heart Tour in September 2015. On October 17, 2015, Schumer's comedy special Amy Schumer: Live at the Apollo premiered on HBO. In 2016, it was nominated for three Primetime Emmy Awards for Outstanding Variety Special, Writing, and Directing. It also garnered her a nomination for the Grammy Award for Best Comedy Album.

Schumer started her first world tour on August 26 in Dublin. Also that year, Schumer wrote a memoir, entitled The Girl with the Lower Back Tattoo. It held the top position on The New York Times Non-Fiction Best Seller list for two weeks in September 2016 and garnered her a nomination for the Grammy Award for Best Spoken Word Album. Schumer made her Broadway debut in 2017 acting in Steve Martin's comedy play Meteor Shower alongside Keegan-Michael Key, Laura Benanti and Jeremy Shamos. The play revolves around two couples in 1993 who spend an evening with each other. David Rooney of The Hollywood Reporter wrote "Schumer is one of four terrific performers who juice the entertainment of this high-sheen production...which would never have made it this far without Martin's name behind it, or more crucially, without the marquee draw of Schumer making her Broadway debut." Schumer was nominated for the Tony Award for Best Actress in a Play losing to Glenda Jackson for the revival of Edward Albee's Three Tall Women.

In 2018, she starred in the comedy film I Feel Pretty, which received negative reviews from critics. Spotify released the original podcast Amy Schumer Presents: 3 Girls, 1 Keith on June 21, 2018, starring Schumer and her best comedy friends Rachel Feinstein, Bridget Everett and Keith Robinson as they talk about comedy, pop culture, politics and their personal lives. She released her standup special Amy Schumer: Growing (2019) on Netflix to positive reviews. Schumer received a Primetime Emmy Award for Outstanding Writing for a Variety Special nomination. That same year she appeared as herself in the CBS comedy No Activity and the HBO series Crashing.

=== 2020–present ===
In May 2020, Schumer alongside her husband Chris Fischer starred in an eight-episode cooking show Amy Schumer Learns to Cook, for Food Network which followed Schumer and Fischer cooking while quarantined during the COVID-19 pandemic. The series was self-shot and also featured Schumer donating to The Coalition of Immokalee Workers Fair Food Program and domestic violence organizations. It premiered on May 11, 2020. She next appeared in a documentary series Expecting Amy, which she also executive produced, following Schumer preparing for a stand-up special while going through a difficult pregnancy for HBO Max, which premiered on July 9, 2020.

Schumer appeared in the 2021 film The Humans, based upon the play of the same name directed by Stephen Karam. She wrote, directed, and starred in Life & Beth, a 10-episode comedy series for Hulu which premiered on March 18, 2022. The revival of her sketch series Inside Amy Schumer, which had been on hiatus since 2016, was announced in February 2021, with five additional specials to be released through Paramount+. In January 2022, she was cast as a guest role for season two of Only Murders in the Building. She co-hosted the 94th Academy Awards with Regina Hall and Wanda Sykes on March 27, 2022. In June, she joined the cast of Jerry Seinfeld's Unfrosted. In 2023 her comedy special Emergency Contact, which she also directed, was released.

== Influences ==
Schumer's comedic influences include Wendy Liebman, Carol Burnett, Lucille Ball, and Joan Rivers. Additionally, she called actress-producer Goldie Hawn one of her "heroes".

== In media ==
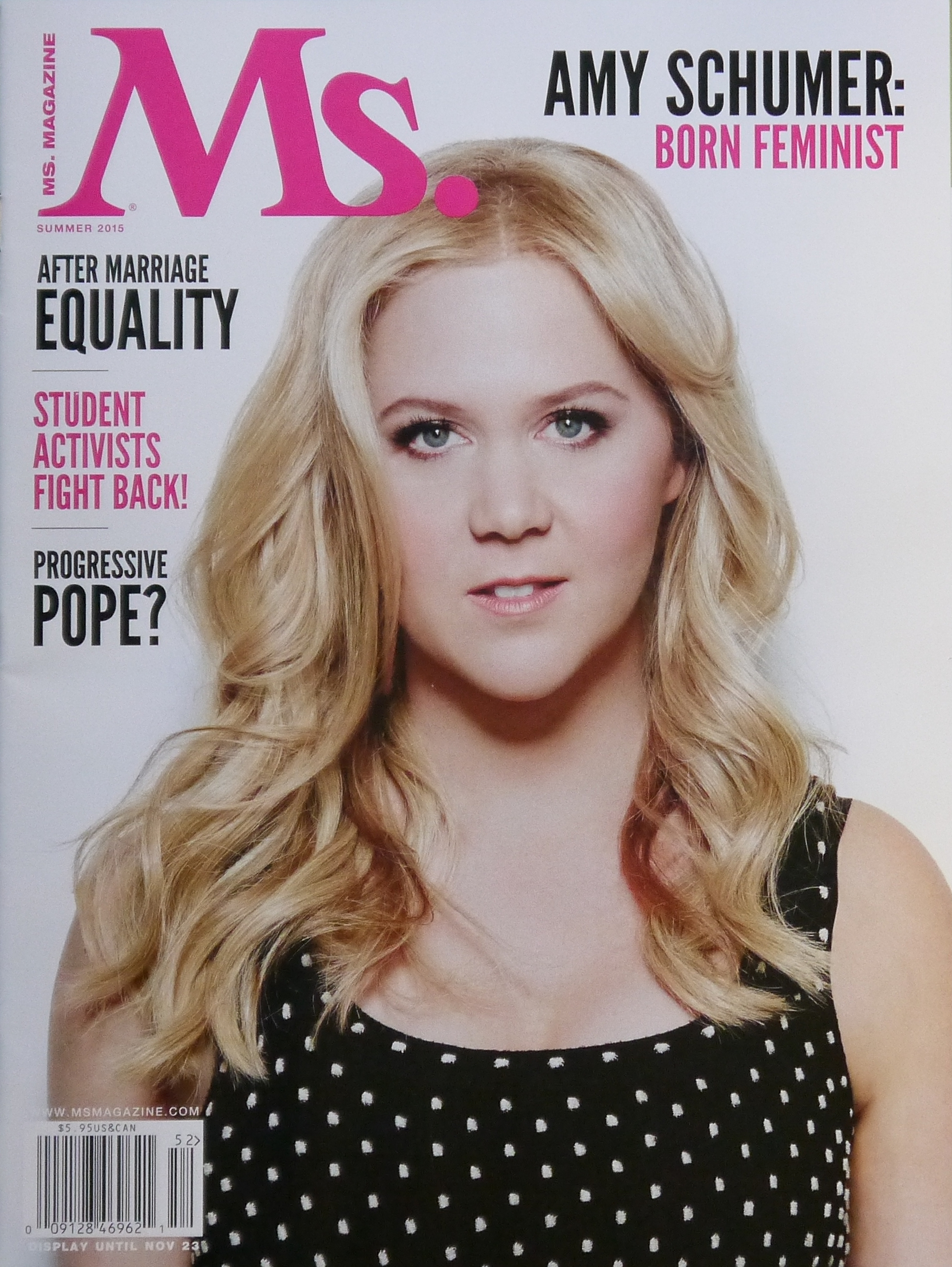
Schumer on the cover of the Summer 2015 issue of Ms. magazine

In 2015, Schumer was named one of Time magazine's 100 most influential people. Schumer was named to Barbara Walters' 10 Most Fascinating People for 2015. Schumer has received praise for addressing various social issues through comedy.

Throughout 2015, several of Schumer's skits in Inside Amy Schumer went viral online, sparking editorials regarding sex, feminism, and rape culture.

In June 2015, Monica Heisey of The Guardian criticized her for "a shockingly large blind spot around race". Schumer responded on Twitter, stating "I go in and out of playing an irreverent idiot. That includes making dumb jokes involving race ... You can call it a 'blind spot for racism' or 'lazy,' but you are wrong. It is a joke ... I am not racist." Schumer was again criticized in July 2020 by Kyndall Cunningham of The Daily Beast for her earlier work, which included "objectifying black men" and calling Latina women "crazy". Cunningham described her "sudden" decision to support the Black Lives Matter movement as "befuddling and laughable".

After a fatal shooting took place at a showing of Trainwreck in Louisiana, Schumer advocated for stricter gun control laws and increased mental health funding. After her 2018 wedding, Schumer asked fans to donate to Everytown for Gun Safety instead of giving wedding gifts.

In November 2015, Schumer posed nude for a photo by photographer Annie Leibovitz for the 2016 edition of the Pirelli Calendar. Schumer tweeted the photo, writing "Beautiful, gross, strong, thin, fat, pretty, ugly, sexy, disgusting, flawless, woman. Thank you."

In January 2016, Schumer was accused of stealing jokes from comedians Tammy Pescatelli, Kathleen Madigan, Wendy Liebman, and Patrice O'Neal. Schumer denied the allegations. Other comedians, such as Marc Maron and Dave Rubin, defended Schumer. Pescatelli later apologized, stating it had "gone too far" and was probably "parallel thinking".

== Political advocacy ==
Since the 2010s, Schumer has been an active celebrity presence in liberal politics, endorsing Democratic Party candidates and sometimes making appearances with her cousin Chuck Schumer.

On October 4, 2018, Schumer was arrested at the U.S. Capitol while protesting the nomination of Brett Kavanaugh as an Associate Justice of the U.S. Supreme Court.

Schumer has used her role as a comedian to encourage higher voter turnout and spread awareness about voter ID laws. Prior to the 2022 midterm elections, she worked with voter ID education and assistance organization VoteRiders to raise awareness of local ID requirements.

Schumer supported Andrew Cuomo during the 2025 New York City mayoral election. Schumer had previously supported Cuomo during the 2018 New York gubernatorial election before supporting his opponent Cynthia Nixon, then switching back to Cuomo. She praised the eventual winner Zohran Mamdani for condemning the painting of swastikas on a Jewish day school in Brooklyn, writing, "The Jewish community is looking forward to having your support, Mayor-Elect [Mamdani]... a united NYC is a stronger, better NYC".

=== Israel ===
Schumer has been a vocal advocate for Israel following the October 7 attacks, a stance for which she has received backlash. Critics have accused Schumer of posting Islamophobic content and misinformation, including sharing a post which depicted pro-Palestinian protesters as holding up signs that read, "Gazans rape Jewish girls only in self-defense".

In October 2023, Schumer was one of over 700 Hollywood professionals who signed an open letter condemning Hamas and demanding the release of hostages held in Gaza. That month, she was criticized for a social media post in which she asserted that an Islamic Jihad missile was responsible for the Al-Ahli Arab Hospital explosion and accused media outlets of "blaming Israel" for the explosion.

Schumer told Variety in 2024, "I don't agree with anything that Netanyahu is doing, and neither do the Israelis I know. Of course what's going on in Gaza is sickening, horrifying and unthinkable". She added, "The focus is so razor-sharp on Jewish people but not on Hamas", and recommended that people read Israel: A Simple Guide to the Most Misunderstood Country on Earth, a 2021 book by Noa Tishby.

In January 2026, Schumer defended Israeli comedian Guy Hochman after a Beverly Hills theater canceled his show when he refused to condemn the Gaza genocide.

== Personal life ==
Schumer dated professional wrestler Nic Nemeth, known by his ring name Dolph Ziggler, and comedian Anthony Jeselnik. She dated Ben Hanisch from 2015 to 2017.

In early 2017, Schumer adopted a black dog named "Tati", after Tatiana Maslany.

On February 13, 2018, Schumer married chef and farmer Chris Fischer in Malibu, California. In 2019, Schumer gave birth to their son via caesarean section due to her endometriosis. In September 2021, Schumer had her uterus removed to alleviate symptoms related to the condition. In February 2024, she announced that she had been diagnosed with Cushing's syndrome. Schumer announced her separation from Fischer on December 12, 2025. Schumer and Fischer divorced in September 2026.

In 2026, Schumer spoke publicly about her weight-loss journey, saying she had turned to the medication Mounjaro (tirzepatide) after previously discontinuing Ozempic and Wegovy because a GDF15 gene variant left her severely nauseated.

== Acting credits ==
=== Film ===
Year	Title	Role	Notes
2006	Sense Memory		Short film
2012	Sleepwalk with Me	Amy	Uncredited
2012	Price Check	Lila	
2012	Seeking a Friend for the End of the World	Lacey/Woman #1	
2015	Trainwreck	Amy Townsend	Also writer
2017	Snatched	Emily Middleton	
2017	Thank You for Your Service	Amanda Doster	
2018	I Feel Pretty	Renee Bennett	Also producer
2021	The Humans	Aimee Blake	
2022	Bros	Eleanor Roosevelt	
2023	Trolls Band Together	Velvet (voice)	
2024	Unfrosted	Marjorie Post	
2024	IF	Gummy Bear (voice)	
2025	Kinda Pregnant	Lainy Newton	Also writer

=== Television ===
Year	Title	Role	Notes
2007	Live at Gotham	Herself	Episode: "2.6"
2007	Last Comic Standing	Herself	7 episodes
2008	Reality Bites Back	Herself	7 episodes
2009	Cupid	Heather	Episode: "The Tommy Brown Affair"
2009	30 Rock	Stylist	Episode: "Mamma Mia"
2010	John Oliver's New York Stand-Up Show	Herself	Episode: "1.4"
2010	Comedy Central Presents	Herself	Episode: "14.14"
2011	Curb Your Enthusiasm	Teammate #2	Episode: "Mister Softee"
2011	Comedy Central Roast of Charlie Sheen	Roaster	TV special
2012	Delocated	Trish	8 episodes
2012	Louie	Diane (voice)	Episode: "Barney/Never"
2012	Comedy Central Roast of Roseanne Barr	Roaster	TV special
2012	The Eric Andre Show	Interviewer	Episode: "Brandi Glanville"
2012	Amy Schumer: Mostly Sex Stuff	Herself	Stand-up special
2012	Dave's Old Porn	Herself	Episode: "2.3"
2013	Women Who Kill	Herself	Stand-up special with Rachel Feinstein, Marina Franklin and Nikki Glaser
2013–14	Girls	Angie	2 episodes
2013–16, 2022	Inside Amy Schumer	Herself, various characters	44 episodes; also creator, writer, executive producer, director
2015	2015 MTV Movie Awards	Herself (host)	TV special
2015	BoJack Horseman	Irving Jannings (voice)	Episode: "Chickens"
2015–22	Saturday Night Live	Herself (host)	3 episodes
2015	Amy Schumer: Live at the Apollo	Herself	Stand-up special
2016	The Simpsons	Mrs. Burns (voice)	Episode: "Monty Burns' Fleeing Circus"
2016	Family Guy	Factory Crew Leader (voice)	Episode: "The Boys in the Band"
2016	Bob's Burgers	Young Lady (voice)	Episode: "Flu-ouise"
2017	Amy Schumer: The Leather Special	Herself	Stand-up special
2019	Crashing	Herself	Episode: "The Christian Tour"
2019	No Activity	Herself	Episode: "Tooth and Nail"
2019	Amy Schumer: Growing	Herself	Stand-up special
2020	Amy Schumer Learns to Cook	Herself	8 episodes; also creator and executive producer
2020	Expecting Amy	Herself	3 episodes; also creator and executive producer
2022–24	Life & Beth	Beth	Also creator, writer, director, and executive producer
2022	94th Academy Awards	Herself (co-host)	Television special
2022	Only Murders in the Building	Herself	2 episodes
2022	Gutsy	Herself	Episode: "Gutsy Women Have the Last Laugh"
2023	Amy Schumer: Emergency Contact	Herself	Stand-up special; also director

=== Theater ===
Theater roles by Amy Schumer
Year	Title	Role	Venue
2017–2018	Meteor Shower	Corky	Booth Theatre, Broadway

== Discography ==
=== Albums ===
- 2011: Cutting (Comedy Central Records) – CD/download/streaming
- 2016: Live at the Apollo (Maverick Records) – Download/streaming
- 2017: The Leather Special (Netflix) – LP

=== Videos ===
- 2010: Comedy Central Presents – DVD/download/streaming
- 2013: Mostly Sex Stuff (Comedy Central 2012) – DVD/download/streaming
- 2015: Live at the Apollo (HBO Home Video) – DVD/download/streaming
- 2017: The Leather Special (Netflix) – Streaming
- 2019: Growing (Netflix) – Streaming

=== Audiobook ===
- 2016: The Girl with the Lower Back Tattoo (Gallery Books) – CD/download/streaming

=== Compilation appearances ===
- 2013: Women Who Kill (Tracks 1–3) (Entertainment One) – DVD/download/streaming
- 2015: Comedy Central Stand-Up Vault# 3 (Comedy Central) – DVD
- 2018: Just for Laughs: The Nasty Show, Vol. 1 (Tracks 1–2) – CD/download/streaming
- 2018: Just for Laughs: The Nasty Show, Vol. 2 (Tracks 1–3) – CD/download/streaming
- 2019: Just for Laughs: Funny AF, Vol. 1 (Track 1) – CD/download/streaming
- 2019: Just for Laughs: Funny AF, Vol. 2 (Tracks 1–3) – CD/download/streaming
- 2019: Just for Laughs: Funny AF, Vol. 3 (Track 1) – CD/download/streaming

== Podcast ==
- Amy Schumer Presents: 3 Girls, 1 Keith (2018–2020, host)

== Bibliography ==
- Schumer, Amy (2016). The Girl with the Lower Back Tattoo. New York: Gallery Books. ISBN 9781501139888. OCLC 954091842.
