= The Wanda Sykes Show =

2009–2010 American TV series

- Created by: Wanda Sykes
- Presented by: Wanda Sykes
- Starring: Wanda Sykes; Keith Robinson; Porsche
- Country of origin: United States
- Original language: English
- No. of seasons: 1
- No. of episodes: 21

Production
- Running time: 40 minutes
- Production companies: Sykes Entertainment, Inc. Fox Television Studios

Original release
- Network: Fox
- Release: November 7, 2009 – April 24, 2010

The Wanda Sykes Show is an American talk show hosted by comedian Wanda Sykes on Fox that debuted on November 7, 2009. Comedian Keith Robinson co-starred as Sykes' sidekick.

The series was announced in March 2009 by Kevin Reilly. The show aired on Fox on Saturday nights, replacing MADtv and Talkshow with Spike Feresten.

On May 14, 2010, Fox announced that The Wanda Sykes Show was canceled after only one season. The decision left the Fox network with no original late-night programming for the first time since the 1994–95 season.

== Episodes ==
No.	Original air date	Guest(s)
1	November 7, 2009	Mary Lynn Rajskub, Phil Keoghan and Daryl Mitchell
2	November 14, 2009	Chad Ochocinco, Ian Gomez, Tom Joyner and John Salley
3	November 21, 2009	Seth Green, Margaret Cho and JB Smoove
4	November 28, 2009	Jane Velez-Mitchell, Kathleen Madigan, Ed Begley, Jr., and Michael Strahan.
5	December 5, 2009	Dr. Drew Pinsky, Fred Willard, Annie Duke and Earthquake
6	December 12, 2009	Jenna Jameson, Megan Mullally, Carol Leifer and Andy Borowitz.
7	December 19, 2009	Jillian Barberie Reynolds, Tim Meadows, Paula Poundstone, and Michelle Rodriguez.
8	January 9, 2010	Tim Bagley, Snoop Dogg, Neil Patrick Harris, and Niecy Nash.
9	January 16, 2010	Mario Joyner, George Wallace, Vivica A. Fox, and Jesse Tyler Ferguson
10	January 23, 2010	The cast of The Buried Life, Regina King, Paul Rodriguez and John Salley
11	January 30, 2010	Aisha Tyler, Hamish Linklater and Kunal Nayyar
12	February 6, 2010	Kara DioGuardi, Penn Jillette and Donald Faison
13	February 20, 2010	Sade, Greg Fitzsimmons, MC Lyte and Brandon T. Jackson
14	February 27, 2010	Eddie Izzard, Ray Romano, Chris Rock, Cheryl Hines, and Colin Quinn
15	March 6, 2010	Wesley Snipes, Nick Cannon, Gina Gershon and Greg Giraldo
16	March 13, 2010	Constance McMillen, Suze Orman, Bill Maher, Lisa Kudrow and Aisha Tyler
17	March 20, 2010	Roland Martin, Wayne Brady, Rebecca Mader and Kevin Hart
18	March 27, 2010	George Lopez, Annabelle Gurwitch and Craig Robinson
19	April 3, 2010	Erykah Badu, Drew Carey, Craig Ferguson and Wendy Williams
20	April 17, 2010	Chonda Pierce, Tom Bergeron, Laila Ali and Columbus Short
21	April 24, 2010	Bryan Cranston, Regina Hall and Tommy Lee
