= Amy Schumer: Live at the Apollo =

Stand up comedy special by Amy Schumer

- Poster
- Genre: Comedy
- Written by: Amy Schumer
- Directed by: Chris Rock
- Starring: Amy Schumer
- Country of origin: United States
- Original language: English

Production
- Executive producers: Amy Schumer; Jimmy Miller; Mike Berkowitz; Tony Hernandez; Steven Ast
- Producers: Kim Caramele; Kevin Kane; John Skidmore
- Running time: 1 hour
- Production company: Jax Media

Original release
- Network: HBO
- Release: October 17, 2015

Amy Schumer: Live at the Apollo is an hour-long comedy special from Amy Schumer that premiered on HBO on October 17, 2015. The special was recorded in May 2015 with comedian Chris Rock directing; Rock's work earned a Primetime Emmy nomination for Outstanding Directing for a Variety Special. Amy Schumer: Live at the Apollo also received Primetime Emmy nominations for Outstanding Variety, Music or Comedy Special and Outstanding Writing for a Variety Special. The special also earned a Writers Guild of America nomination.

== Reception ==
Reviewing the special in Paste, Garrett Martin described the topics of Schumer's special as similar to the stand-up clips in her television show Inside Amy Schumer, but "she’s matured as a comedian—she’s able to get bigger and better laughs with material that’s a little bit subtler than in the past." In Slate, Willa Paskin said much of the special was "funny and scathing" but while "Schumer often makes fun of both herself and of gender standards, which can be a cannily self-deprecating way of skewering the status quo...sometimes [this] just seems like an inadvertent upholding of it."

== Awards ==
In 2017, the album was nominated for the Grammy Award for Best Comedy Album at the 59th Annual Grammy Awards.
