= Arthur Spivak =

American music manager

- Born: Chicago, Illinois, U.S.
- Occupations: Talent manager, Producer, Investor, Businessman
- Years active: 1979–present
- Organization: Spivak Management
- Known for: Manager of Prince, Tori Amos, Juicy J, A Perfect Circle, Thirty Seconds to Mars, Queens of the Stone Age, Three Days Grace, Yellowcard

Arthur Spivak is an American entertainment executive, producer and personal manager. During his career, he has represented recording artists such as Prince, Juicy J, Tori Amos, Queens of the Stone Age, A Perfect Circle, Thirty Seconds to Mars, Saosin, Yellowcard, Three Days Grace, The Distillers, Ashes Divide, Collective Soul, Flyleaf, Vanessa Carlton, and comedians Paul Reiser, Kevin Pollak, Larry Miller, Bruce Bruce, Sheryl Underwood, and Chad Prather.

Spivak spent more than two decades in management, managing such artists as Midnight Oil, Little Steven, and The Smithereens among others before founding the company, Spivak Entertainment, in the early 1990s in Los Angeles, California. He produced comedy specials for Paul Reiser entitled, “Out on a Whim” and “3 ½ Blocks From Home” for Showtime, and Kevin Pollak's HBO special, "Stop With The Kicking". From 1992-99 Spivak produced the hit NBC show Mad About You. In 1996, the company was merged into Spivak Sobol Entertainment, jointly run with Stu Sobol. In 1998, Spivak produced “Tori Amos, Live from NY” for Lifetime. In 2004, Arthur announced a deal with Beverly Hills management company The Firm, Inc. Spivak told Billboard magazine that the merger was about "clout, access to information, cross-marketing potential and value to clients".

In 2012, Spivak co-founded the production and management company Laff Mobb with Def Comedy Jam Producer Bob Sumner. In 2012-14 they produced standup comedy specials for Showtime Networks entitled, Mark Viera, “Tales of a Nuyorican”, Roz G, “Ain’t Got Jokes, Got Problems, Red Grant, “Caught Red Handed” and Rudy Rush, “From Harlem To Hollywood.” They have also produced standup comedy specials for BET, Dish Network, Vubiquity, InDemand among many others. They also worked with Aspire Networks with the release of Laff Mobb, We Got Next and TruTv's Laff Mobb's Laff Tracks.

Spivak re-entered the music business as the manager of Three 6 Mafia's Juicy J and his endeavors as a producer and entrepreneur.

In 2020, Spivak produced the 'gen z' raunchy, comedy hit, "The Fu*k Happened."
