= Laff Mobb's Laff Tracks =

American television series

- Genre: Television comedy
- Created by: Jamal Dedeaux; Carlos Koustas
- Starring: Cipha Sounds
- Composer: Matthew Newman Dunne
- Country of origin: United States
- Original language: English
- No. of seasons: 2
- No. of episodes: 38

Production
- Executive producers: Eric Abrams; Edgar Cutino; Jamal Dedeaux; Hugh Fink; Rebecca T. Haze; Royal Malloy; Arthur Spivak; Colt Straub; Duke Straub; Bob Sumner; Mark Therrien; Matthew Vaughan
- Producers: Eric Abrams; Brian Baldinger; Brandon Broady; Samson Crouppen; Kris Simms
- Cinematography: Jordan Levy; Pete Villani; Eric Wycoff; Teruhisa Yoshida
- Editors: Dan Cotter; Sam Dakil; Jamal Dedeaux; Rebecca T. Haze; Donnie Leapheart; Paul Marengo; Aaron Morris; John Sandlin; Nadav Streett
- Running time: 22 minutes
- Production companies: American Chainsaws; Rotten Science; Spivak Management / Laff Mobb Enterprises

Original release
- Network: truTV
- Release: January 3, 2018 – January 24, 2020

Laff Mobb's Laff Tracks is an American comedy television series that premiered on January 3, 2018, on truTV. Hosted by Cipha Sounds, the show centers on reenactment skits voiced by comedians. The second season premiered November 8, 2019. On January 24, 2020, the series was canceled after two seasons.

== Premise ==
Comedians tell funny stories that play out in skits reenacted by actors.

== Cast ==
- James Davis
- Rachel Feinstein
- Ronnie Jordan
- Donnell Rawlings
- Chris Redd
- Yamaneika Saunders
- Cipha Sounds
- Chaunté Wayans
- Mark Viera
- Gina Yashere
- Janelle James
- Michelle Buteau
- Ali Siddiq
- Brad Williams
- Leah Lamarr
- Brian Patrick Butler
- Sydnee Washington
- Aida Rodriguez

== Episodes ==
Season	Episodes	Originally released	
Season	Episodes	First released	Last released
1	26	January 3, 2018	December 21, 2018
2	12	November 8, 2019	January 24, 2020

== Production ==
=== Development ===
Executive producers include Bob Sumner Arthur Spivak, Carlos Koustas, and Jamal Dedeaux of Laff Mobb Entertainment and Royal Malloy, Colt Straub, Duke Straub, and Mark Therrien of American Chainsaws Entertainment. Felonious Munk is among the creators.

=== Casting ===
Cipha Sounds is the host of the show.

== Release ==
The show premiered on January 3, 2018 on truTV.
