= Rachel Feinstein (comedian) =

American comedian

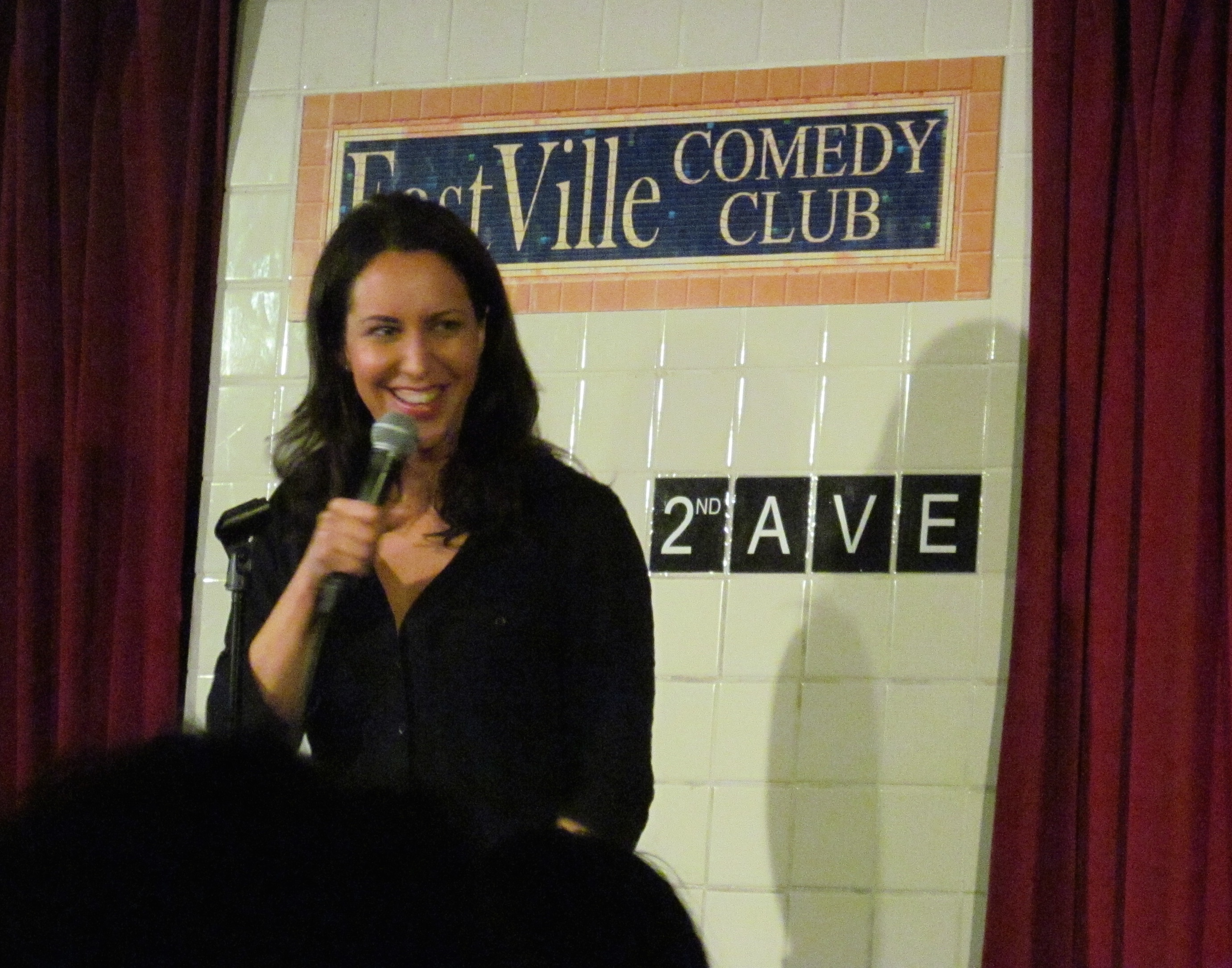
- Eastville Comedy Club, Brooklyn, 2014
- Born: Washington, D.C., U.S.
- Spouse: Peter Brennan (m. 2018)
- Children: 1

Comedy career
- Medium: Stand-up, film, television
- Genre: Observational comedy
- Website: rachel-feinstein.com

Rachel Feinstein (/ˈfaɪnstaɪn/) is an American actress and stand-up comedian. Feinstein was a finalist on season 7 of Last Comic Standing (2010). In 2011, she released her first comedy album, Thug Tears. In 2014, she appeared on Comedy Central Stand-Up Presents. In 2016, her first comedy special, Only Whores Wear Purple, was released on Comedy Central, and in 2024, her second special, Big Guy, was released on Netflix.

== Early life ==
Feinstein was born in Washington, D.C. and grew up in Bethesda, Maryland. Her father, Howard Feinstein, was a civil rights lawyer and a blues musician and her mother, Karen, was a social worker. Her father is of Russian and Polish Jewish ancestry, whereas her mother was raised a Methodist, converting to Judaism upon marrying her father. Feinstein's mother was raised in the Mojave Desert region of California, and met Feinstein's father while the two were studying at the University of California, Santa Barbara.

Feinstein has said that she was a poor student and "barely graduated" high school. She moved to New York City at age 17 with her then-boyfriend, a musician. After breaking up with her boyfriend, Feinstein "did some theater first. Then I started doing open mics. The first time I went out was at a bar that was doing a comedy night and I bombed wildly. I just kept trying to go up and do those bringer shows where you have to bring like five people just to get on stage. I didn’t know many people in New York, so I would just try to make friends with people and bother them into coming to shows."

== Career ==
Feinstein was a finalist on season 7 of Last Comic Standing (2010). She played a comedian performing as herself in the feature film Her Composition (2015), directed by Stephan Littger. In 2011, she released Thug Tears, her first comedy album, through Comedy Central Records.

In 2013, she was featured on the video game Grand Theft Auto V, providing the voice of talk show host Michele Makes. In 2013, she was featured in the web series Reel Advice from Rachel Feinstein from downpour.com via youtube.com.

In 2016, Feinstein released her first comedy special, Only Whores Wear Purple, produced and presented by Amy Schumer.

She subsequently appeared on the HBO series Crashing (2017–2019), and in the comedy series Inside Amy Schumer (2013–2022), and Life & Beth (2022). Feinstein was also featured on an episode of The Standups (2018). She has performed sets on Conan, The Tonight Show and The Late Late Show.

== Personal life ==
In September 2018, Feinstein married Peter Brennan, a Battalion Chief of the New York City Fire Department. Fellow comedian Amy Schumer was her maid of honor. On February 20, 2020, on the Dudley & Bob with Matt Afternoon Show (93.7 KLBJ-FM), Feinstein stated she was 7 months pregnant. She later gave birth to a daughter.

== Discography ==
- Thug Tears (2011)
- Only Whores Wear Purple (2016)

== Filmography ==
=== Film ===
Year	Title	Role	Notes	Ref.
2008	Turbocharge: The Unauthorized Story of The Cars	Joshua; Jeep Girl		
2010	Circus Maximus	Octavia		
2011	Stags	Escort		
2013	Peace After Marriage	Sasha		
2014	Top Five	Publicist		
2015	Trainwreck	Nurse Rachel		
2015	3rd Street Blackout	Melanie		
2015	Her Composition	Rachel		
2018	I Feel Pretty	Soulcycle Woman		
2021	Hysterical	Herself	Documentary film	

=== Television ===
Year	Title	Role	Notes	Ref.
2006	Samurai Love God	Various	3 episodes	
2009–2010	The Venture Bros.	Barbara Qantas	2 episodes	
2010	Last Comic Standing	Herself	Contestant	
2014	Teachers Lounge	School Nurse	1 episodes	
2013–2022	Inside Amy Schumer	Various	7 episodes	
2014	Stuck on A		1 episode	
2014	Friends of the People	Phyllis	1 episode	
2015	Red Oaks	Jean Blum	1 episode	
2017	Odd Mom Out	Kara	1 episode	
2017–2019	Crashing	Herself	6 episodes	
2018	The Standups	Herself		
2018–2020	Laff Mobb's Laff Tracks			
2019	Historical Roasts	Anne Frank	1 episode	
2022	Life & Beth	Liz	2 episodes	
2022	Would I Lie to You? USA	Herself	1 episode	

=== Comedy specials ===
Year	Title	Notes	Ref.
2014	Comedy Central Stand-Up Presents	Released via Comedy Central	
2015	Millennium Stage	Released via Kennedy Center	
2016	Only Whores Wear Purple	Released via Comedy Central	
2024	Big Guy	Released via Netflix	

=== Video games ===
Year	Title	Role	Notes	Ref.
2013	Grand Theft Auto V	Michelle Makes	Voice role	
