= Amy Schumer: The Leather Special =

2017 stand-up comedy special by Amy Schumer

- Promotional poster
- Written by: Amy Schumer
- Directed by: Amy Schumer
- Starring: Amy Schumer
- Country of origin: United States

Production
- Running time: 57 minutes

Original release
- Network: Netflix
- Release: March 7, 2017

Amy Schumer: The Leather Special is comedian Amy Schumer's first stand-up special for the streaming-service Netflix. It was recorded at Colorado's Bellco Theatre in Denver on November 5, 2016. The hour-long special premiered globally on March 7, 2017.

== Production and release ==
Schumer recorded The Leather Special at the Bellco Theatre in Denver, Colorado on Saturday November 5, 2016. The show was part of a 2016 world tour with shows on three continents.

Netflix released the special on March 7, 2017.

== Reception ==
On Metacritic it has a score of 72 out of 100 based on reviews from 5 critics, indicating "generally favorable" reviews. On the review aggregator Rotten Tomatoes it has an approval rating of 50% based on reviews from 8 critics.

The San Francisco Chronicle's review was entitled "Schumer's comic genius on full display in Netflix special" in which David Wiegand described The Leather Special as "an hour of hilarious, raunchy comedy", praising Schumer's "timing, her way of landing a punch line with a bang, so to speak, and then tossing a little afterword over her shoulder". In Entertainment Weekly, Ray Rahman wrote of the special: "It's pretty much 85 percent sex jokes. The good news is that all the sex jokes are very funny! And even when Schumer turns her attention elsewhere, she still kills it." Lorraine Ali of the Los Angeles Times was more critical, stating, "Ironically, the dirtier it gets, the less daring it feels", and that "the material feels like it could have come from a set three years ago."

The special received a large number of negative ratings from audiences (averaging of one star out of five on Netflix a week after premiering) as well as far more reviews total than other Netflix comedy specials released around the same time. Reporting by Splitsider suggested that Reddit commenters contributed to this, citing posts on the Donald Trump-supporting subreddit, /r/The Donald, actively encouraging negative reviews, with messages such as "please go and 1 star that piece of shit". Schumer later responded, saying the attacks by alt-right "trolls" made her feel "powerful and dangerous and brave". While some of the user reviews represented misogyny, others came from "self-proclaimed Schumer supporters" who did not like this special. Vice Magazine noticed that the Metacritic user score for The Leather Special which at the time was only 1.2 out of 10, and used it to suggest Netflix original programming had become mediocre in the years from 2013 to 2017.
