= Life & Beth =

2022 American comedy-drama TV show

- Genre: Comedy drama
- Created by: Amy Schumer
- Starring: Amy Schumer; Violet Young; Michael Cera; Susannah Flood
- Country of origin: United States
- Original language: English
- No. of seasons: 2
- No. of episodes: 20

Production
- Executive producers: Amy Schumer; Kevin Kane; Daniel Powell; Ryan McFaul
- Running time: 22–36 minutes
- Production companies: It's So Easy Productions; Irony Point; Endeavor Content

Original release
- Network: Hulu
- Release: March 18, 2022 – February 16, 2024

Life & Beth is an American comedy-drama television series created by Amy Schumer, who also stars alongside Violet Young, Michael Cera, Yamaneika Saunders, Michael Rapaport, and Susannah Flood. The show premiered on Hulu on March 18, 2022. In April 2022, the series was renewed for a ten-episode second season. On February 16, 2024, the second season was released. In July 2024, Hulu cancelled the series after two seasons.

== Premise ==
The series follows wine salesperson Beth who realizes that she is dissatisfied with her life when her mother unexpectedly dies.

A storyline in the second season about Matt's discovery that he had a teenage daughter is based in part on a real-life event that happened to the actor playing Matt, Kevin Kane.

== Cast and characters ==
=== Main ===
- Amy Schumer as Beth, a sales representative of a mid-size wine company in New York City who reassesses all her life decisions upon the death of her mother
  - Violet Young as a young version of Beth
- Michael Cera as John, a farmhand who befriends Beth on one of her sales trips to rural Long Island
- Susannah Flood as Ann, Beth's younger sister

=== Recurring ===
- Yamaneika Saunders as Maya
- Michael Rapaport as Leonard
- Jon Glaser as Gerald
- Kevin Kane as Matt
- Laura Benanti as Jane
- Sas Goldberg as Jess
- Arielle Siegel as Jen
- Larry Owens as Clark
- Rosebud Baker as Meri
- LaVar Walker as Lavar
- Gary Gulman as Shlomo
- Murray Hill as Murray (S1)

== Episodes ==
Season	Episodes	Originally released
1	10	March 18, 2022
2	10	February 16, 2024

=== Season 1 (2022) ===
No. overall	No. in season	Title	Directed by	Written by	Original release date
1	1	"Life & Beth"	Amy Schumer	Amy Schumer	March 18, 2022
2	2	"We're Grieving"	Ryan McFaul	Amy Schumer	March 18, 2022
3	3	"Out on the Island"	Ryan McFaul	Colleen McGuinness	March 18, 2022
4	4	"Pancakes"	Amy Schumer	Amy Schumer	March 18, 2022
5	5	"Fair"	Kevin Kane	Amy Schumer	March 18, 2022
6	6	"Boat"	Ryan McFaul	Emily Goldwyn	March 18, 2022
7	7	"Leonard"	Daniel Powell	Ron Weiner	March 18, 2022
8	8	"Homegoing"	Ryan McFaul	Colleen McGuinness	March 18, 2022
9	9	"MRI"	Amy Schumer	Amy Schumer	March 18, 2022
10	10	"Kiss from a Rose"	Amy Schumer	Amy Schumer	March 18, 2022

=== Season 2 (2024) ===
No. overall	No. in season	Title	Directed by	Written by	Original release date
11	1	"Trust Me"	Amy Schumer	Amy Schumer	February 16, 2024
12	2	"Who Dat?"	Ryan McFaul	Chuck Hayward & Mia Jackson	February 16, 2024
13	3	"Nothing Can Get Me Down"	Ryan McFaul	Phoebe Walsh	February 16, 2024
14	4	"This Soup is Gonna Be Good"	Ryan McFaul	Ron Weiner	February 16, 2024
15	5	"Claire"	Daniel Powell	Daniel Powell	February 16, 2024
16	6	"The Work"	Ryan McFaul	Tami Sagher	February 16, 2024
17	7	"That's What Friends Are For"	Ryan McFaul	Tova Diker	February 16, 2024
18	8	"Shower Sex"	Kevin Kane	Jeremy Beiler	February 16, 2024
19	9	"Toxic"	Amy Schumer	Alison Leiby & Sahar Jahani	February 16, 2024
20	10	"Road to Nowhere"	Amy Schumer	Amy Schumer	February 16, 2024

== Release ==
Life & Beth premiered with all 10 episodes on March 18, 2022, on Hulu. It was later released internationally through Disney's Star content hub on Disney+. In Latin America, it was made available to stream on Star+. The series was also made accessible on Disney+ Hotstar in Southeast Asia.

== Reception ==
=== Viewership ===
Whip Media, which tracks viewership data for the more than 21 million worldwide users of its TV Time app, reporte that Life & Beth was the seventh most-streamed original series in the U.S. during the week of March 27, 2022.

=== Critical reception ===
The review aggregator website Rotten Tomatoes reported a 90% approval rating with an average rating of 7.30/10, based on 38 critic reviews. The website's critics consensus reads, "Beth proves there's still plenty of life left in Amy Schumer's artistic project, boasting the comedian's most nuanced performance yet." Metacritic, which uses a weighted average, assigned a score of 70 out of 100 based on 19 critics, indicating "generally favorable reviews".

Amanda Whiting of The Independent stated that Life & Beth marks a significant shift in Amy Schumer's work, moving away from her previous, more self-indulgent roles. They praised the series for its focus on self-reflection rather than humor, noting how Schumer draws on personal experiences, like her struggles with trichotillomania and her relationship with her husband, to add depth to the show. Whiting also appreciated Schumer's new, introspective approach to comedy, pointing out that her jokes and performances now show a greater level of emotional maturity. Kathryn VanArendonk of Vulture observed that Life & Beth offers a contemporary spin on the classic theme of returning home to rediscover oneself, reminiscent of romance novels and Hallmark movies. VanArendonk praised its engaging performances, particularly by Schumer and Michael Cera, as well as its genuine exploration of personal growth. However, they noted that the series sometimes struggles to integrate its elements, especially when transitioning between Schumer's personal experiences and Beth's childhood. Despite this, VanArendonk found the show's blend of comedy and heartfelt storytelling often satisfying.

Caroline Framke of Variety found Schumer's shift from her usual brash comedy to a more introspective, semi-autobiographical story refreshing and fitting. They praised the series for its evocative direction and strong performances, particularly by Schumer, Michael Cera, and Violet Young. However, Framke asserted that the show initially struggled with a slow start and passive character dynamics but gained momentum as it progressed. They complimented the series for its emotional depth and the effective chemistry between Schumer and Cera. Clare Martin of Paste rated Life & Beth 7.5 out of 10, saying it captures the bittersweet experience of returning to one's roots. They praised Schumer for her introspective approach and for drawing on her own life experiences, including her relationship with her real-life husband. Martin complimented the performances, particularly Michael Cera and Violet Young, for adding emotional depth, though they noted some tonal inconsistencies between the comedic present and dramatic flashbacks. Despite these issues, they highlighted the show's emotional resonance and strong performances as key reasons to watch.

=== Accolades ===
Life & Beth was nominated for Best Comedy/Drama TrailerByte for a TV/Streaming Series at the 2024 Golden Trailer Awards. The series was also one of 200 television series that received the ReFrame Stamp for the years 2020 to 2021. The stamp is awarded by the gender equity coalition ReFrame and industry database IMDbPro for film and television projects that are proven to have gender-balanced hiring, with stamps being awarded to projects that hire female-identifying people, especially women of color, in four out of eight key roles for their production.
