= Israel: A Simple Guide to the Most Misunderstood Country on Earth =

2021 book by Noa Tishby

- Author: Noa Tishby
- Publisher: Simon & Schuster
- Publication date: April 6, 2021
- ISBN: 978 1 9821 4494 4
- Website: Israel: A Simple Guide To The Most Misunderstood Country On Earth

Israel: A Simple Guide To The Most Misunderstood Country On Earth is a non-fiction book authored by Israeli actress and activist, Noa Tishby. The book is primarily about the history and political conflicts of the Middle Eastern region, with an emphasis on Israel, along with autobiographical anecdotes, including Tishby's journey towards Zionist activism, accounts of her family members and the various roles played by her ancestors in the formation of modern-day Israel.

== Content ==
Tishby opens by describing her early interest in the performing arts, which continued during her service in the Israel Defense Forces (IDF) where she was in a unit which entertained troops through music and performance. She notes that this experience culminated in her career as an actor in Hollywood in United States.

Tishby recounts her inspiration for activism in favor of the Jewish people: the favorable online representation of the people aboard the Turkish flotilla attempting to breach the blockade of the Gaza Strip jointly imposed by Israel and Egypt. This, she argues, motivated the formation of the online advocacy group, Act for Israel. She writes that Israel is the only country in the Middle East that has had an uninterrupted democracy since its formation in 1948, i.e. the grant of state for the Jewish people by the United Nations.

Tishby disputes the assertion that Israel is a "colonist state", stating that it is actually a "refugee state" which was decolonized from British rule. She also rejects the assertion that it was an "apartheid state", writing that the third largest political party in Israel is Arab and that all Israeli, irrespective of their descent, enjoy equal rights under the rule of law. Tishby addresses the assumption that modern-day Palestinians are descendants of the biblical Philistines; she states that the argument "cannot be corroborated anywhere, neither in historical documents nor in archaeological findings", whereas "Them pesky Jews, on the other hand, are traditionally, philosophically, and religiously the exact same people."

Today's Palestinians are a proud nation, she writes, but the conflict does not go all the way back there, as some have tried to argue.

Tishby argues that the Israeli-Palestinian conflict should instead be viewed as a conflict between "the entire Arab world and Israel", with the former consisting of a population of approximately 423 million persons, and the single Jewish state in the world consisting of a population of approximately 9 million.

In the following chapters, she explores the geo-political climate of the Middle East and the conditions that led to World War I. The book delves into the circumstances leading to the establishment of the Hussein-McMahon Correspondence and the Balfour Declaration, followed by their nullification due to the enforcement of the clandestinely formed Sykes–Picot Agreement.

Besides examining the politics prevailing in the Middle East, throughout the book Tishby writes about the role played by her grandmother (Safta) Fania, in the conception of Israel's first kibbutz, Degania Alef, and the rise of the Zionist movement. Through her grandmother's journey from Russia to Jaffa (now part of Tel Aviv, Israel) Tishby traces the evolving meaning of Zionism and the changes from the ideal of a socialist collective to a society grappling with capitalism and religion.

Tishby dedicates several chapters of scattered references to her grandfather, Hanan Yavor, who was a member of the Israeli delegation to the United States and the first Israeli Ambassador in West Africa, who played a key role in establishing Israel's international relationships with Africa.

=== Boycott, Divestment; Sanctions (BDS) ===
Towards the conclusion of the book, Tishby scrutinizes the Boycott, Divestment and Sanctions (BDS) movement. In the chapter titled "BDS", Tishby argues that while BDS externally advocates for innocuous objectives such as "freedom, justice, and equality" for Palestinians, it is not a peaceful movement:

Let me be clear: BDS is not a movement for justice or for peace. The movement doesn't offer any solutions for peace anywhere.

Furthermore, Tishby argues that BDS fabricates information, contorts data, and ignores key details pertaining to the conflicts in the Middle Eastern region, in order to manipulate their audience into espousing an anti-Israel and anti-Jewish views, being especially successful in American college campuses. Tishby cites Palestinian Israel journalist Khaled Abu Toameh from an article of Jerusalem Center for Security and Foreign Affairs to assert that the BDS movement hurts their livelihood and does more harm than good:

The current Palestinian political economy, influenced far too greatly by the BDS and anti-normalization campaigns, amounts to a corrupt, unsustainable, terror supporting regime that is disinterested in the economic well-being of its own people and the development of a new state.

Tishby alleges that the BDS movement's channels of finance are extremely convoluted making it nearly impossible to trace its true source of funds. She writes that many figures associated with Hamas belonged to those responsible for spearheading the BDS movement, while also adding the caveat that she was not conveying a definitive relation between the two groups. She ends the chapter for transparency in relation to the BDS movement.

In her final chapter, leading to the book's conclusion, Tishby offers a series of refutations to some of the most common arguments made against Israel. She closes by stating that Israel seeks and stands for peace, and by calling for the creation of a "New Middle East" for future generations.

== Reception ==
Israel: A Simple Guide To The Most Misunderstood Country On Earth was the fourth book in the New York Times paperback bestseller list of October 2023. According to The Jerusalem Post, Tishby gives a well-researched overview of her country "that will surprise even Jewish history aficionados." In May 2021, Amazon's charts ranked the book as the number one bestseller in the categories of Middle Eastern Politics, Historical Middle East Biographies, and Israel & Palestine History. Joy Getnick for the Jewish Book Council stated that "Tishby presents key talking points on key issues in an energetic and engaging way, relevant for newbies and seasoned advocates alike." The Jerusalem Post states that the book's liberal accent on Zionism and modern Israeli history downplays the connection of Jewish history to their "ancestral homeland", while maintaining that the book "is a useful resource for young adults and open-minded liberals of all ages interested in the realities and intricacies of modern Israel."

The Guardian offered a more negative review, describing Tishby as invoking "tired caricatures of Palestinians and Arabs that are dismissive if not mildly racist," and criticizing her for not engaging more with the Palestinian narrative: "she celebrates Jewish refugeedom, but her 'intrepid curiosity' is not extended to Palestinians, whose identity and history she often dismisses, and whom she rarely speaks with".
