= Trainwreck (film) =

2015 film by Judd Apatow

- Theatrical release poster
- Directed by: Judd Apatow
- Written by: Amy Schumer
- Produced by: Judd Apatow; Barry Mendel
- Starring: Amy Schumer; Bill Hader; Brie Larson; Colin Quinn; John Cena; Tilda Swinton; LeBron James
- Cinematography: Jody Lee Lipes
- Edited by: William Kerr; Paul Zucker
- Music by: Jon Brion
- Production company: Apatow Productions
- Distributed by: Universal Pictures
- Release dates: March 15, 2015 (SXSW); July 17, 2015 (United States)
- Running time: 125 minutes
- Country: United States
- Language: English
- Budget: $35 million
- Box office: $140.8 million

Trainwreck is a 2015 American romantic sex comedy film directed and co-produced by Judd Apatow and written by and starring Amy Schumer, alongside Bill Hader, Brie Larson, Colin Quinn, John Cena, Tilda Swinton, and NBA star LeBron James, with Vanessa Bayer, Ezra Miller, Mike Birbiglia, and Norman Lloyd in supporting roles. The film is about a hard-drinking, promiscuous, free-spirited magazine writer named Amy Townsend (Schumer) who has her first serious relationship with a prominent orthopedic surgeon named Aaron Conners (Hader). The film received positive reviews from critics, praising the performances of Schumer, Hader, and James, while also praising the screenplay.

Principal photography began on May 19, 2014, in New York City. The film premiered at South by Southwest on March 15, 2015, and was theatrically released in the United States on July 17, 2015, by Universal Pictures. The film won several awards and was nominated for numerous others, including two Golden Globe Awards (Best Motion Picture – Musical or Comedy and Best Actress in a Motion Picture – Musical or Comedy) and the Writers Guild of America Award for Best Original Screenplay.

== Plot ==
In 1992, Gordon Townsend tells his young daughters Amy and Kim that the impending divorce with their mother was inevitable as monogamy is not realistic, repeating it like a mantra. Twenty-three years later, Amy is a heavy-drinking, over-sexed party girl who works as a columnist for a men's magazine in New York City, and is dating gym-addict Steven. Her cold British boss, Dianna, assigns her to write an article about sports doctor Aaron Conners.

While interviewing Aaron, a text from Kim insisting they move Gordon to a cheaper assisted-living facility causes Amy to hyperventilate. He calms her down, suggesting dinner. There, he praises her writing and talks about his family. After drinks, she suggests going to his place to have sex. Although it's against her rule of never sleeping over after sex, she stays the night when asked.

The next day, Aaron calls to ask if they can see each other again. Panicking, she tells him they will talk about it at the interview, then she and her friend Nikki decide it has to end. Meanwhile, Aaron's friend, LeBron James, is excited for him as Aaron has not dated for six years. Amy watches Aaron performing surgery to Billy Joel's "Uptown Girl", his favorite song. Afterwards, she tries to break it off, but he insists they like each other and should date. Amy then receives a call that her father has fallen, so Aaron drives and tends to her father.

Aaron and Amy begin dating and fall for each other. She is worried she is going to mess up, but Kim tells her she is just doing what's normal. Gordon dies from heart failure due to hoarding his medication. At his funeral, Amy and Kim have a falling out: Amy accuses Kim of not caring about Gordon as she has always been more sympathetic towards him and has developed a similar outlook on relationships and life in general over the years. Shortly after, Aaron tells Amy that he loves her; she berates him for choosing that particular day to say it for the first time.

Aaron receives a prestigious award at a luncheon and brings Amy. While he is making his speech, her boss Dianna calls and threatens to fire her if she does not answer. Amy takes the call, leaving during Aaron's speech. Afterwards, Aaron is upset that she missed it, which starts an argument. Returning home, he thinks they should not go to bed angry, so Amy rants all night. Too tired to perform a scheduled operation on Amar'e Stoudemire that morning, Aaron tells her they need to take a break. Hurt, Amy tells him they should just break up as his article got canceled. Saying "You win," he leaves.

Out drinking with her co-workers, the intern takes Amy home; their bizarre sexual encounter is interrupted by his mom, revealing he is only 16. The next day, Dianna fires her for the incident. Aaron is moping in his apartment when LeBron calls, claiming he has been injured. He rushes over to find a group waiting to conduct an intervention, including LeBron, Matthew Broderick, Chris Evert, and Marv Albert. They tell him he has always been afraid of opening up and needs to fix things with Amy, but Aaron insists it is over.

Making amends with Kim, Amy catches up; and they, Kim and her family, comfort her with a group hug. Amy decides it is time to change, clearing out all the alcohol from her apartment. She takes her Aaron story to Vanity Fair, where it is published, and she sends Aaron the magazine with the story. After attending a game at Madison Square Garden, he is called back to the court, where the Knicks City Dancers perform with Amy front and center, to Aaron's favorite songs, including "Uptown Girl". She tells him she wants to make their relationship work. They profess their love and kiss, to applause.

== Cast ==
- Amy Schumer as Amy Townsend
  - Devin Fabry as young Amy
- Bill Hader as Dr. Aaron Conners
- Brie Larson as Kim Townsend
  - Carla Oudin as young Kim
- Colin Quinn as Gordon Townsend
- John Cena as Steven
- Vanessa Bayer as Nikki
- Mike Birbiglia as Tom
- Ezra Miller as Donald
- Dave Attell as Noam
- Tilda Swinton as Dianna
- LeBron James as himself
- Jon Glaser as Schultz
- Randall Park as Bryson
- Evan Brinkman as Alistair
- Amar'e Stoudemire as himself
- Norman Lloyd as Norman
- Cliff "Method Man" Smith as Temembe
- Daniel Radcliffe as The Dog Walker
- Marisa Tomei as The Dog Owner
- Keith Robinson as Guy in Back of the Theater
- Marv Albert as himself
- Matthew Broderick as himself
- Chris Evert as herself
- Tony Romo as himself
- Leslie Jones as Angry Subway Patron
- Pete Davidson as Dr. Conners' patient
- Josh Segarra as Staten Island Oli
- Bobby Kelly as One-Night Stand Guy
- Dan Soder as Dumpster Guy
- Tim Meadows as Tim
- Jim Florentine as One-Night Stand Guy
- Nikki Glaser as Lisa
- Claudia O'Doherty as Wendy
- Bridget Everett as Kat
- Jim Norton as Carriage Driver (uncredited)
- Rachel Feinstein as Nurse Rachel

== Production ==
On August 26, 2013, Universal Studios optioned an untitled script written by Amy Schumer that she would also star in. On November 27, 2013, it was announced that Judd Apatow would direct the film. On January 8, 2014, it was announced that the film would be released on July 24, 2015. On January 30, 2014, Bill Hader joined the cast of the film. On February 18, 2014, Brie Larson also joined the cast. On March 28, 2014, Colin Quinn, Barkhad Abdi, Mike Birbiglia, Jon Glaser, Vanessa Bayer, John Cena, Ezra Miller, and Tilda Swinton were cast in the film, though Abdi ultimately did not appear in it. On May 7, 2014, Method Man and LeBron James joined the cast of the film. On June 30, Daniel Radcliffe was spotted filming some scenes for the film, which confirmed his casting. On July 1, Marisa Tomei was also confirmed to appear, in scenes with Radcliffe. In an interview with The New York Times, Schumer revealed that she and Apatow dismissed their first idea for a story (later revealed to have Schumer as a used-car saleswoman), and shifted to an amplified and comedic version of Schumer's own past as its basis.

=== Filming ===
Principal photography began on May 19, 2014, in New York City. On June 2, the crew began filming in the area of Manhattan and Long Island. Principal photography ended on August 1, 2014. Editing on the movie began with the start of filming; the movie was finalized in December 2014.

=== Music ===
Jon Brion composed the music for the film.

== Reception ==
=== Box office ===
Trainwreck grossed $110.2 million in North America and $30.6 million in other territories for a total gross of $140.8 million, against a budget of $35 million.

In the United States and Canada, Trainwreck opened on July 17, 2015, the same day as the superhero film Ant-Man. Initial projections had the film opening to around $20 million, with The Hollywood Reporter noting that it could overperform if it was popular with females or underperform given how R-rated comedies had struggled over the summer, with both Ted 2 and Magic Mike XXL failing to meet expectations. It made $1.8 million on Thursday night showings, which began at 8 p.m. in 2,363 theaters, and $10.7 million on its opening day. Through its opening weekend, it grossed $30.1 million in 3,158 theaters, exceeding expectations. This was Apatow's second-biggest debut as a director (just behind the $30.7 million debut of Knocked Up) and the sixth-biggest debut for a film that he was involved in as a writer, director or producer. The film played 69% female with 66% over 25 years old, which is typical for an R-rated comedy. According to a poll conducted by Rentrak in its opening weekend, 28% of respondents said they went to see the film because of Schumer.

=== Lafayette shooting ===
On July 23, 2015, a mass shooting occurred at the Grand 16 movie theater in Lafayette, Louisiana, during a screening of the movie that resulted in two dead and nine injured.

=== Critical response ===
On Rotten Tomatoes the film has an approval rating of 84% based on 286 reviews, with an average rating of 7.3/10. The website's critical consensus reads, "Trainwreck drags commitment out of all but the most rom-com-phobic filmgoers with sharp humor, relatable characters, and hilarious work from Amy Schumer." On Metacritic, the film has a weighted average score of 75 out of 100, based on 45 reviews, indicating "generally favorable reviews". Audiences polled by CinemaScore gave the film an average grade of "A−" on an A+ to F scale.

Michael Phillips of the Chicago Tribune gave the film three and a half stars out of four, saying, "Schumer and Hader are wonderful together. Gender inequity in the world of comedy deserves all the overdue attention it's getting, and more. But there are matters of craft, wit (no matter how crude the jokes) and timing that transcend chromosomes." Richard Roeper of The Chicago Sun Times praised the performances of the cast, particularly Schumer, Hader, Quinn, and James. He also called Schumer's performance worthy of an Academy Award nomination. Benjamin Lee of The Guardian gave the film three out of five stars, stating, "Judd Apatow's latest is rough around the edges, but his focus on a female protagonist refreshes a genre in sore need of change". Ian Crouch, writing for The New Yorker, singled out LeBron James' performance for praise, writing that "it seems safe to declare that he has given the greatest motion-picture acting performance by an active professional basketball player of all time (but we know Jabbar already has this in Airplane)." Chris Nashawaty of Entertainment Weekly gave the film a B+, saying, "Beneath all of his bad-boy shtick, Apatow's always been a pretty conventional moralist. But Schumer gives their raunchy rom-com enough of her signature spikiness to prevent it from ever feeling predictable." Jacob Hall of the New York Daily News gave the film four out of five stars, saying, "Schumer raises Apatow's game beautifully. Her biting, pitch-black wit and his penchant for character-driven comedy go together like gin and tonic." Peter Travers of Rolling Stone gave the film three-and-a-half stars out of four, saying "Sweet is not how Schumer wants Trainwreck to go down. She wants to explode rom-com clichés and replace them with something fierce and ready to rumble. Done."

Sara Stewart of the New York Post gave the film four out of four stars, saying "Trainwreck is a corrective to a lot of outdated clichés. It's very funny and sweet and even a little weepy, and it has maybe the best scene ever filmed of dirty talk gone wrong." Ty Burr of The Boston Globe gave the film three out of four stars, saying "Trainwreck serves as confirmation that a star is born, a seemingly average woman whose above-average superpowers include reminding us of our own. Where she goes from here should be fascinating to watch." Brian Truitt of USA Today gave the film three out of four stars, saying "With films such as Funny People and This Is 40, Apatow has toyed with finding the right blend of the serious and the hilarious and finally hits it here." Moira MacDonald of The Seattle Times gave the film three out of four stars, saying, "There's nothing remotely fresh about this plotline (or the way Apatow, true to form, makes the movie 20 minutes longer than it should be), but Trainwreck works as comedy more often than it doesn't—and that's rare enough." Alonso Duralde of The Wrap said, "Ultimately comes down in favor of mainstream girl-gets-boy in a way that Inside Amy Schumer might find a little dubious, but it never feels like Schumer is aggressively watering down her uniquely prickly brand of comedy for a mass audience."

=== Home media ===
Trainwreck was released on DVD and Blu-ray on November 10, 2015.

=== Accolades ===
Award	Category	Recipients	Result
ACE Eddie Awards	Best Edited Feature Film – Comedy or Musical	William Kerr and Paul Zucker	Nominated
Austin Film Critics Association	The Robert R. "Bobby" McCurdy Memorial Breakthrough Artist Award	Amy Schumer	Nominated
Chicago Film Critics Association	Most Promising Performer	Amy Schumer	Nominated
Critics' Choice Awards	Best Comedy	Trainwreck	Nominated
Critics' Choice Awards	Best Actor in a Comedy	Bill Hader	Nominated
Critics' Choice Awards	Best Actress in a Comedy	Amy Schumer	Won
Denver Film Critics Society	Best Comedy	Trainwreck	Nominated
Denver Film Critics Society	Best Original Screenplay	Amy Schumer	Nominated
Empire Awards	Best Comedy	Trainwreck	Nominated
Empire Awards	Best Screenplay	Amy Schumer	Nominated
Golden Globe Awards	Best Motion Picture – Musical or Comedy	Trainwreck	Nominated
Golden Globe Awards	Best Actress in a Motion Picture – Musical or Comedy	Amy Schumer	Nominated
Hollywood Film Awards	Hollywood Comedy Award	Amy Schumer	Won
Kansas City Film Critics Circle	Best Original Screenplay	Trainwreck	Nominated
Las Vegas Film Critics Society	Best Original Screenplay	Trainwreck	Nominated
Las Vegas Film Critics Society	Best Comedy Film	Trainwreck	Won
London Film Critics Circle	Supporting Actress of the Year	Tilda Swinton	Nominated
MTV Movie Awards	Best Breakthrough Performance	Amy Schumer	Nominated
MTV Movie Awards	Best Comedic Performance	Amy Schumer	Nominated
MTV Movie Awards	Best Kiss	Amy Schumer and Bill Hader	Nominated
MTV Movie Awards	Best Ensemble Cast	Trainwreck	Nominated
People's Choice Awards	Favorite Comedic Movie	Trainwreck	Nominated
People's Choice Awards	Favorite Comedic Movie Actress	Amy Schumer	Nominated
Phoenix Critics Circle	Best Comedy Film	Trainwreck	Nominated
St. Louis Film Critics Association	Best Comedy Film	Trainwreck	Won
Washington D.C. Area Film Critics Association	Best Original Screenplay	Amy Schumer	Nominated
Writers Guild of America Awards	Best Original Screenplay	Amy Schumer	Nominated
Women Film Critics Circle	Best Comedic Actress	Amy Schumer	Won
