= The Girl with the Lower Back Tattoo =

Book by Amy Schumer

- Book cover
- Author: Amy Schumer
- Language: English
- Subject: Herself, comedy
- Genre: Autobiography
- Publisher: Gallery Books
- Publication date: August 16, 2016
- Publication place: United States
- Media type: Hardcover, Paperback, Audiobook
- Pages: 336
- ISBN: 978-1-5011-3988-8

The Girl with the Lower Back Tattoo is an autobiographical book by American stand-up comedian and actress Amy Schumer. It topped The New York Times Best Seller list shortly after its release in 2016.

The book addresses subjects such as gun violence in the United States, sexual assault and consent, domestic violence, as well as more personal issues such as her troubled relationship with her mother, and her father's multiple sclerosis.

The book's title is a reference to The Girl with the Dragon Tattoo.

== Reception ==
The book received generally favorable reviews from critics. Isabella Biedenharn of Entertainment Weekly gave the book a B+, writing that the book was "full of advice—and not just the tongue-in-cheek kind you might expect from a stand-up comedian" and that it was "much more like a straightforward memoir than even [Schumer] appears to believe", summing up her review stating that the book was "far less a portable joke factory than it is a real, deep dive into Schumer's life."

Heidi Stevens of the Chicago Tribune wrote that when a celebrity "offers a self-reveal" it's "an exercise in either vanity or courage", but that Schumer's was "mostly the latter", and that "even the parts that veer into the former are witty enough to make you glad you stuck around." Lincee Ray of the Associated Press said that "readers will laugh and cry, and may put the book down from moments of honesty that result in uncomfortable realistic details from her life."

== Awards ==
In 2016, the book won Best Humor, with 41,080 votes, at the Goodreads Choice Awards.

In 2017, the audiobook, read by Amy, was nominated for the Grammy Award for Best Spoken Word Album at the 59th Annual Grammy Awards.
