= Amy Schumer: Growing =

- Written by: Amy Schumer
- Directed by: Amy Schumer
- Starring: Amy Schumer
- Country of origin: United States
- Original language: English

Production
- Producers: It's So Easy Productions; Netflix
- Running time: 60 minutes

Original release
- Network: Netflix
- Release: March 19, 2019

Amy Schumer: Growing is an American stand-up comedy special by Amy Schumer. It was recorded at the Chicago Theatre while Schumer was in the second trimester of pregnancy with her first child. The hour-long special premiered March 19, 2019 on Netflix.

== Background ==
Schumer developed and directed the special while amidst a 60-show tour of 42 cities in the United States. On the first day she was expected to film the special, Schumer was hospitalized due to issues with hyperemesis gravidarum as she could not keep water down.

== Reception ==
On Rotten Tomatoes 79% of the 14 reviews are positive. The website's critics consensus reads: "Amy Schumer's standup matures in an hour filled with concise insights into aging and matrimony, marked with only slight Growing pains as the comedian refreshes her comedic voice."

== Awards and nominations ==
Award nominations for Amy Schumer: Growing
Year	Award	Category	Nominated work	Result
2019	Emmy Award	Primetime Emmy Award for Outstanding Writing for a Variety Special	Amy Schumer	Nominated
2019	Broadcast Film Critics Association Award	Best Comedy Special	Amy Schumer: Growing	Nominated
2019	Online Film & Television Association Award	Best Writing of a Variety, Reality or Non-Fiction Program	Amy Schumer	Nominated
