= Inside Amy Schumer =

American sketch comedy television series

- Genre: Sketch comedy
- Created by: Amy Schumer; Daniel Powell
- Written by: Jessi Klein (seasons 1–4); Amy Schumer; Kyle Dunnigan; Jon Glaser; Gabe Liedman; Kurt Metzger; Tami Sagher; Christine Nangle; Daniel Powell; Antonio Pollio; Brandon T. Snider
- Directed by: Neal Brennan; Steven Tsuchida; John Lee
- Starring: Amy Schumer
- Country of origin: United States
- Original language: English
- No. of seasons: 5
- No. of episodes: 44

Production
- Executive producers: Amy Schumer; Brooke Posch; Daniel Powell; Kevin Kane
- Camera setup: Single
- Running time: 22–24 minutes
- Production companies: Comedy Partners; So Easy Productions; Irony Point; Jax Media; MTV Entertainment Studios (season 5)

Original release
- Network: Comedy Central
- Release: April 30, 2013 – June 16, 2016
- Network: Paramount+
- Release: October 20 – November 10, 2022

Inside Amy Schumer is an American sketch comedy television series created and hosted by Amy Schumer. The series aired on Comedy Central from April 30, 2013, to June 16, 2016, and was revived in 2022 for a fifth season on Paramount+. Schumer and Daniel Powell served as the show's executive producers. The show received a Peabody Award and has been nominated for eight Primetime Emmy Awards, winning three.

Inside Amy Schumer completed its second season on June 3, 2014, and was renewed for a third season a week later. The third season premiered on April 21, 2015, with a fourth season ordered the same day, which premiered one year later on April 21, 2016. On January 6, 2016, the show was renewed for a fifth season. In August 2016, there was speculation though that the show had been cancelled despite the earlier announcement of renewal. Schumer denied the reports via social media, stating that production of the show was going on hiatus while she focused on touring. However, she also stated that she was "not making the show anymore". According to a March 2019 interview by The New York Times, Schumer was under contract to produce another season of the show, leading to its eventual return.

On February 24, 2021, it was announced that the show would be revived with five specials by Paramount+. On September 20, 2022, it was reported that the five installments were no longer called specials but instead would be the five episodes of the fifth season: two episodes debuting on October 20, with the rest released weekly. The series was canceled on June 26, 2023, and removed from Paramount+, while plans to air the fifth season were subsequently dropped on Comedy Central. The complete series library was acquired by Hulu.

== Format ==
Each episode is divided into several segments of varying length – sketches, short excerpts of stand-up comedy and street interviews with members of the public. The majority of episodes finish with an interview of an unusual figure, often regarding sexuality or gender roles. Amy Schumer is the only person featured in every episode and each segment. For its fifth season, the format removed stand-up and interview segments, and gained partly animated musical numbers.

== Episodes ==
Season	Episodes	Originally released	
Season	Episodes	First released	Last released
1	10	April 30, 2013	July 2, 2013
2	10	April 1, 2014	June 3, 2014
3	10	April 21, 2015	July 7, 2015
4	9	April 21, 2016	June 16, 2016
5	5	October 20, 2022	November 10, 2022

=== Season 1 (2013) ===
No. overall	No. in season	Title	Original release date	U.S. viewers (millions)
1	1	"Bad Decisions"	April 30, 2013	1.56
Amy Schumer auditions for 2 Girls 1 Cup with a Brazilian porn star. Amy has a one-night stand, then imagines spending the rest of her life with him. Amy has a regrettable airplane flight, but is pleased to have sex with her married ex. Amy interviews a model.
2	2	"Real Sext"	May 7, 2013	1.35
Amy tries to sext, but does it wrong. Amy visits an Irish restaurant with a testicle theme - O'Nutters. Amy interviews a stripper.
3	3	"A Porn Star Is Born"	May 14, 2013	1.25
Amy quits her job in porn. Amy has difficulty accepting a compliment. Amy's boyfriend tells her that he is HIV-positive. Amy interviews a plastic surgeon.
4	4	"The Horror"	May 21, 2013	1.10
Amy gets a bad haircut. Amy breaks wind when she is afraid. Amy has a romantic encounter with Amber Tamblyn. Amy interviews a man who has a very large penis.
5	5	"Gang Bang"	May 28, 2013	1.05
Amy decides to have a gang bang. Amy becomes a waitress. Amy gives a friend a vibrator. Amy uses cancer to get out of commitments. Amy interviews a dominatrix.
6	6	"Meth Lab"	June 4, 2013	0.85
Amy cooks meth, causing explosions which blow her arms and legs off. Amy gets food slapped out of her mouth. Amy tries to maintain a makeover. Amy goes to the gym to work out while asleep. Amy interviews a ballerina.
7	7	"Unpleasant Truths"	June 11, 2013	0.71
Amy receives a massage. Amy has multiple personalities. Amy has a memorable interaction with a boyfriend. Amy interviews a bodyguard.
8	8	"Clown Panties"	June 18, 2013	0.80
Amy finds out that her boyfriend is cheating on her with a clown. She roasts a terminally ill 12-year-old boy. Amy fights an addiction to buying people things. Amy interviews a six-year-old boy.
9	9	"Terrible People"	June 25, 2013	0.87
Amy wears a catsuit. Amy lies to get out of a charity event. Amy goes to a psychic to contact her dead grandmother, but unintentionally summons the ghost of her creepy Uncle Randy (Dave Attell).
10	10	"Sex Tips"	July 2, 2013	0.82
Amy is disappointed with her devil's threesome, because both men left her out of it. Amy searches for the perfect sex tip while working for a magazine. Amy competes on a dating reality show. Bridget Everett sings about her breasts.

=== Season 2 (2014) ===
No. overall	No. in season	Title	Original release date	U.S. viewers (millions)
11	1	"You Would Bang Her?"	April 1, 2014	1.33
An all-male focus group discuss the show. The conversation concentrates on her looks. Amy has herpes and summons God, who is a middle-aged gay man. Amy marries a black man, where she is photographed by an interracial wedding photographer. Amy is a Russian tennis player who loses a match in straight sets to Bridget Everett. Amy is a secretary. Amy interviews a porn producer.
12	2	"I'm So Bad"	April 8, 2014	0.96
Amy plays a mother in a television advertisement for a finger-shaped snack called Fingerblasters. Amy's boyfriend is playing a military video game. She tries it - and quickly dislikes it. Amy has lunch with her friends. She and most of the group push a waiter to the ground and eat his face. A small group of men, including Amy's husband, talk to each other about their sex lives. Amy's husband's stories about sex with her are badly received by the rest. Amy comes in and details to her husband the sex acts she wants to engage in with him. Amy arrives at a prom in a horse-drawn carriage and wearing a tiara. She attempts to become the date of a teenage boy. She has wrongly assumed that he does not have a date and expects to receive cunnilingus from him. Her plan does not succeed, because he is there with his girlfriend. She leaves, riding the horse. The incident receives negative press coverage. Amy interviews a sex columnist.
13	3	"A Chick Who Can Hang"	April 15, 2014	1.19
Amy hides in a giant cake in order to surprise her boyfriend of seven years on his birthday. She is horrified to overhear him say to one of his guests that he is not really into her. She breaks out of the cake, then angrily breaks up with him and walks off, saying that she has met somebody else. A group of male friends in a bar talk about how much they like tomboys. Amy and her friends talk about a mobile phone app. Amy flirts with a coworker at a fast food restaurant. Amy spends hours on the phone speaking to staff at a call center in order to try to solve her Internet connection problem. She rows to India, where she shoots one of the call center's workers and herself in their heads. Her partner solves the problem by restarting the router. Amy interviews a woman who used to be a phone sex operator.
14	4	"Boner Doctor"	April 22, 2014	0.98
Amy is on a television advertisement using her own phone number to invite men who have priapism to visit her to have their penises softened. Amy stays at a fancy hotel where the staff are very servile to her. However, when she is a few minutes late checking out, they turn hostile and a member of staff picks her up then carries her out. Amy and her partner receive couples therapy from supermodel Chrissy Teigen. He is attracted to her rather than Amy. Amy goes to a clothing store, where she buys a skirt which is far too small for her, believing that she will soon lose a lot of weight. Amy and her co-presenter's TV show is about types of people in the gym who annoy other gym-goers. Amy interviews a young man who used to deliver marijuana.
15	5	"Allergic to Nuts"	April 29, 2014	1.04
Amy is at a pole dancing lesson, where she and the other attendees judge strippers who are leaving a nightclub across the street. Amy plays a voice role in a children's animated film about three meerkats. Her co-stars Jessica Alba and Megan Fox's characters are slim and good-looking, but her character is ugly and fat. A television advertisement for cosmetic surgery. Amy has a nut allergy, and is in a diner with her friend. After a waiter brings them a plate of peanuts each, their heads explode. Amy meets a magician in a bar. She goes to bed with him, and he disappears. Amy interviews her comedian friends.
16	6	"Down for Whatever"	May 6, 2014	0.99
Amy is an animal hoarder who wants to give her animals away. Amy is a participant on Celebrity Spooky Stories, in which she recounts her stay at a hotel which she assumes was haunted. A television advertisement for jewellery. Amy objects to a wedding and the groom admits he is gay. Amy breaks up with her boyfriend in a restaurant, having received advice from a guru. Amy interviews a 106-year-old woman.
17	7	"Slow Your Roll"	May 13, 2014	0.99
Amy hires an interior decorator who describes the toilet as the shitter. Amy is recommended various diets. Amy looks at her sex buddy's Rorschach test inkblots and tells him that they are pictures of her mother's vagina. Amy is an optician. Amy goes to therapy with her mother, and helps her to use a laptop. Amy interviews a comedian about his interesting sex life.
18	8	"Tyler Perry's Episode 208"	May 20, 2014	0.74
Amy thinks she has the perfect boyfriend, but is unaware that he enjoys erotic asphyxiation. Amy looks for a movie to watch with her boyfriend. She wants him to watch Cocktail, but when she leaves the room, he watches Pitch Perfect. Amy raises her estrogen levels by using SandraGel hand cream. Amy is a panelist on a talk show called The Nurses. Amy presents the news and is horrified to find out - while on air - that her boyfriend has another girlfriend. Amy interviews a woman who used to be a flight attendant.
19	9	"Raise a Glass"	May 27, 2014	0.88
Amy is in an elevator with a garrulous middle-aged man and imagines descending into hell. Amy competes in a drunken cooking competition. Amy gives a press conference on a fatal bachelorette party accident. Amy attends a wedding, the bride's funeral, her murder trial - and is executed by electric chair. Amy interviews a comedian friend of hers who has a criminal past.
20	10	"Slut-Shaming"	June 3, 2014	0.82
Amy gets ready for sex. Amy competes on a game show. While Amy is talking to her partner, a man knocks on their door looking for his cat. She is puzzled when the two men passionately kiss. Amy is one of four women on the panel of a talk show called The Gab, in which most of the chat is about their mutual friend Janelle. Amy is a married congresswoman who defends her sluttiness at a press conference. Bridget Everett sings about fellatio.

=== Season 3 (2015) ===
No. overall	No. in season	Title	Original release date	U.S. viewers (millions)
21	1	"Last Fuckable Day"	April 21, 2015	1.01
Amy sings about her buttocks. Amy is married to a coach who implements a no-rape rule on his American football team. Amy joins a picnic with Tina Fey, Julia Louis-Dreyfus and Patricia Arquette. Amy goes to great lengths to obtain birth control. Amy interviews Bailey Jay, a trans woman.
22	2	"Cool With It"	April 28, 2015	0.79
Amy goes to a strip club. Amy stars in a boy band's music video which is about her need for make-up. Amy fights crime as a police detective who is nicknamed Plain Jane. Amy has a leeching boyfriend who wants to be a rapper. Amy interviews Noel Biderman.
23	3	"12 Angry Men Inside Amy Schumer"	May 5, 2015	0.85
In a parody of 12 Angry Men, a jury of 12 men must determine if Amy Schumer is hot enough to be on TV. Initially, only one juror thinks that she is hot enough - but the others are gradually persuaded that she is.
24	4	"I'm Sorry"	May 12, 2015	0.85
Amy is attracted to a young man at a bar; she thinks that he is attracted to her, but he is actually attracted to beer. Amy is an actress who appears on a talk show, where she is very popular with the host and audience. Amy has sex while being videoed. Amy is a scientist at a conference. Amy directs a television commercial for pizza in which one of the actors is a former porn star. Amy interviews a gigolo.
25	5	"Babies & Bustiers"	May 19, 2015	0.67
Amy enjoys her new "bla-dow" - shapewear which makes the wearer's buttocks stick out while compressing her torso. Amy a six-year-old who has a rapid-aging disease who participates in a child beauty pageant. Amy is a dog owner who breastfeeds it. Amy and her friends talk about opening a bakery in Maine. Amy interviews a woman who had been a contestant on The Bachelor.
26	6	"80s Ladies"	May 26, 2015	0.68
Women are visited by a group of four women (including Amy) called the 80s Ladies. One at her office, another at home and another in a clothes shop, where they have Richard Gere's credit card which they stole. Bill Nye claims that the universe sends cryptic messages to women in their twenties, including Amy (who is having an affair with her married boss), Abbi Jacobson (who wants a puggle) and Ilana Glazer (who wants to make mittens). Amy rides a mechanical bull in a bar. Amy defends the actions of Bill Cosby in court by promoting his comedy and likable public persona. Amy is very disappointed to be divorced at 33 and having recently moved back in with her mother. Two friends of Amy's help her to create a man in a 'Weird Science' way, but the result is a severely mutated being. Amy interviews a psychic.
27	7	"Fight Like a Girl"	June 2, 2015	0.71
Amy is a stripper on her first job - going to a house where she strips for a dog's bachelor party while she is dressed as a police officer. Another stripper, dressed as a nurse, goes upstairs with the groom. The bride arrives, and goes upstairs with a gun. Amy flees with the printer. Amy accompanies her partner on a shopping trip for a new shirt. Amy narrates at The Museum of Boyfriend Wardrobe Atrocities. Amy's Russian mail-order husband Vlad arrives at her apartment. She does not remember ordering him, but warms to him and they fall in love. Amy trains men to use feminine fighting techniques. Amy interviews a couple whose relationship has been open for all of the seven years that they have been together.
28	8	"Foam"	June 23, 2015	0.808
A television advertisement for hair dye for women who are on the run. Amy goes to a cocktail party with her boyfriend. She has separate conversations with two men who criticize her for 'being arrogant' by bringing up early in each conversation the fact that she has a boyfriend. When talking to another partygoer, she decides not to mention it and stays with him until his death four decades later. He tells her on his deathbed that he only wanted her as a beard. Amy develops an intense silent romance with her barista via patterns that he draws in the foam of her coffee. Amy becomes a princess, but finds the job harder than she thought. She has to marry her first cousin when she is 14. Her cousin-husband is killed by his own guards, and she is beheaded. Amy has an uncomfortable session with her counselor. The session is of no use to Amy, because the counselor is emotional because her parents were recently killed in a fire. Amy interviews EJ Johnson.
29	9	"Wingwoman"	June 30, 2015	0.885
Amy is an employee of a company called ListenAlert, who are hired by people for $100,000 per month to listen to them. Amy introduces her brother and her boyfriend to each other. When Amy leaves the room, her brother repeatedly tells her boyfriend not have anal sex with her. Her brother's girlfriend is in a wheelchair as a result of anal sex with him. Amy travels through time after her boyfriend suggests that they move in together. Amy is a married woman who becomes her single friend's wingwoman. In Salem, Massachusetts in 1692, Amy and another woman are together tried and convicted of witchcraft and sentenced to be burned at the stake after spreading a sexually transmitted infection. Amy interviews a young Amish woman.
30	10	"3 Buttholes"	July 7, 2015	0.759
In a bar, a man accuses Amy of cockblocking. The ultimate cockblocker, a man in a chicken suit, cockblocks several other people. Amy has a two-week relationship with a man who has a cockney accent and uses a lot of slang. He is poor, unemployed, has an obnoxious personality, and a small penis which does not work properly. Her attraction to him is solely because of his accent. Amy tries to improve her smile with the help of a coach. Amy has three buttholes, which her boyfriend and friends are puzzled and disgusted by. Her friends walk out, giving a fake excuse. Her boyfriend splits up with her. Bridget Everett performs a song in which she repeatedly tells men to put their dick away.

=== Season 4 (2016) ===
No. overall	No. in season	Title	Original release date	U.S. viewers (millions)
31	1	"The World's Most Interesting Woman in the World"	April 21, 2016	0.765
Amy is multi-skilled, popular and interesting - and only has one eye - in a television advertisement for a hospice. Amy and her partner try to avoid sex with each other. Amy is interrogated by politicians when she goes for a pap test. Amy eats a yogurt called Yo-Puss, in order to make her vagina not taste of anything. Amy raps badly for Lin-Manuel Miranda. Amy interviews the woman who has waxed her for nine years.
32	2	"Welcome to the Gun Show"	April 28, 2016	0.785
Amy and her co-host sell guns on a television shopping channel. He accidentally shoots himself in the foot. Twitter's Vice President of Communications is a guest on a talk show where she talks about the site's new emoji. Amy lands a recurring role in Game of Thrones. Amy unsuccessfully tries to persuade undertaker Liam Neeson (who says that he is Don Cheadle) to bury someone whom she loves. Amy interviews an advocate for gun safety.
33	3	"Brave"	May 5, 2016	0.533
Amy wins an Academy Award for Best Actress for her role in a drama film, having quit comedy. Steve Buscemi presents the award, where Amy's fellow nominees are Julianne Moore, Maggie Gyllenhaal, Jennifer Hudson and Laura Linney. Amy sings about achieving closeness with her partner by doing various things. Amy wears Guy-gles at her office, after being given them by an Australian colleague. They are a type of goggles which give the wearer information about her male co-workers when she looks at them - enabling her to work out what type of woman each one wants. Amy appears on television advertisement, promoting to mothers a company which provides nannies that their partners will not want to have sex with - including ugly women, men, robots, a pack of wolves, a team of improvisers and family members. Amy interviews a woman who has Down syndrome.
34	4	"Madame President"	May 12, 2016	0.548
Amy is a member of tabloid media company AMZ. Amily Schinton has her period on her first day as President. Amy plays an office worker in a television advertisement for Tampo, a saxophone for carrying a tampon at work. Amy is in a clothes store, where she attempts to purchase a top. She is treated with hostility by the saleswoman because Amy is a size 12. Amy is shown the part of the shop which is for customers who are not slim. It is a field in which the other customers are Lena Dunham and a cow. Amy is sold a tarpaulin. Amy and her friends talk about their boyfriends. Amy interviews a woman who is a sociopath.
35	5	"Madonna / Whore"	May 19, 2016	0.501
A television advertisement for a sponge wall attachment called Punchables, which enable angry people to punch a wall without damaging it or their hand much. Amy has lost her nose. A group of children who carry out surgery badly attach her arm to her face. Amy and her friends complain to each other about how long it has been since they have had sex. Amy and her friend go on a Sex and the City bus tour. They see another SATC bus tour which is much better and more popular. Amy has trouble figuring out which persona to adopt in bed with a new lover. Amy interviews a Catholic nun.
36	6	"Fame"	May 26, 2016	0.551
In a café, Amy is bombarded with attention from many demanding fans. Amy hosts a talk show from her luxury airship. Amy appears in an episode of Katfish, in which she thinks she is being catfished, but she really has been chatting online with Jake Gyllenhaal. Amy stars in A Pretty Decent Proposal, in which Harvey Keitel pays her husband $39 for sex with her. Amy is strongly attracted to a bad boy chef during dinner at a restaurant with her partner. Amy talks to her friend Jess about films.
37	7	"Psychopath Test"	June 2, 2016	0.696
Amy is part of a group of four women who sing in a karaoke bar about various bad things, then rob a sperm bank. Amy is an actress on a terrible sitcom. She breaks character and expresses her disapproval of it, so is taken off set and replaced with another actress. Amy plays a cute character in a TV commercial for a phone company. Pregnant Amy compares birth plans with other mothers-to-be. Amy is a guide on a hotel room's TV. Amy interviews Jon Ronson.
38	8	"Everyone for Themselves"	June 9, 2016	0.789
A television advertisement for potato chips which do not make a noise when eaten. Amy sees her gynecologist, who refers to Amy's vagina using several slang terms. Amy is pregnant and she and her partner - as well as other expectant parents in the room - talk about their fears about what their babies will be like. A new dating app. Amy tries to get some help for her lizard from the snake doctor. Bridget Everett sings about cunnilingus.
39	9	"Rubbing Our Clips"	June 16, 2016	0.491
The Inside Amy Schumer team comes together for a "Real Housewives"-style reunion hosted by Andy Cohen. Many clips of scenes from various episodes are shown.

=== Season 5 (2022) ===
No. overall	No. in season	Title	Original release date
40	1	"Gratitude"	October 20, 2022
41	2	"Fart Park"	October 20, 2022
42	3	"Tanks"	October 27, 2022
43	4	"Awwwww"	November 3, 2022
44	5	"Quiet Pills"	November 10, 2022

== Reception ==
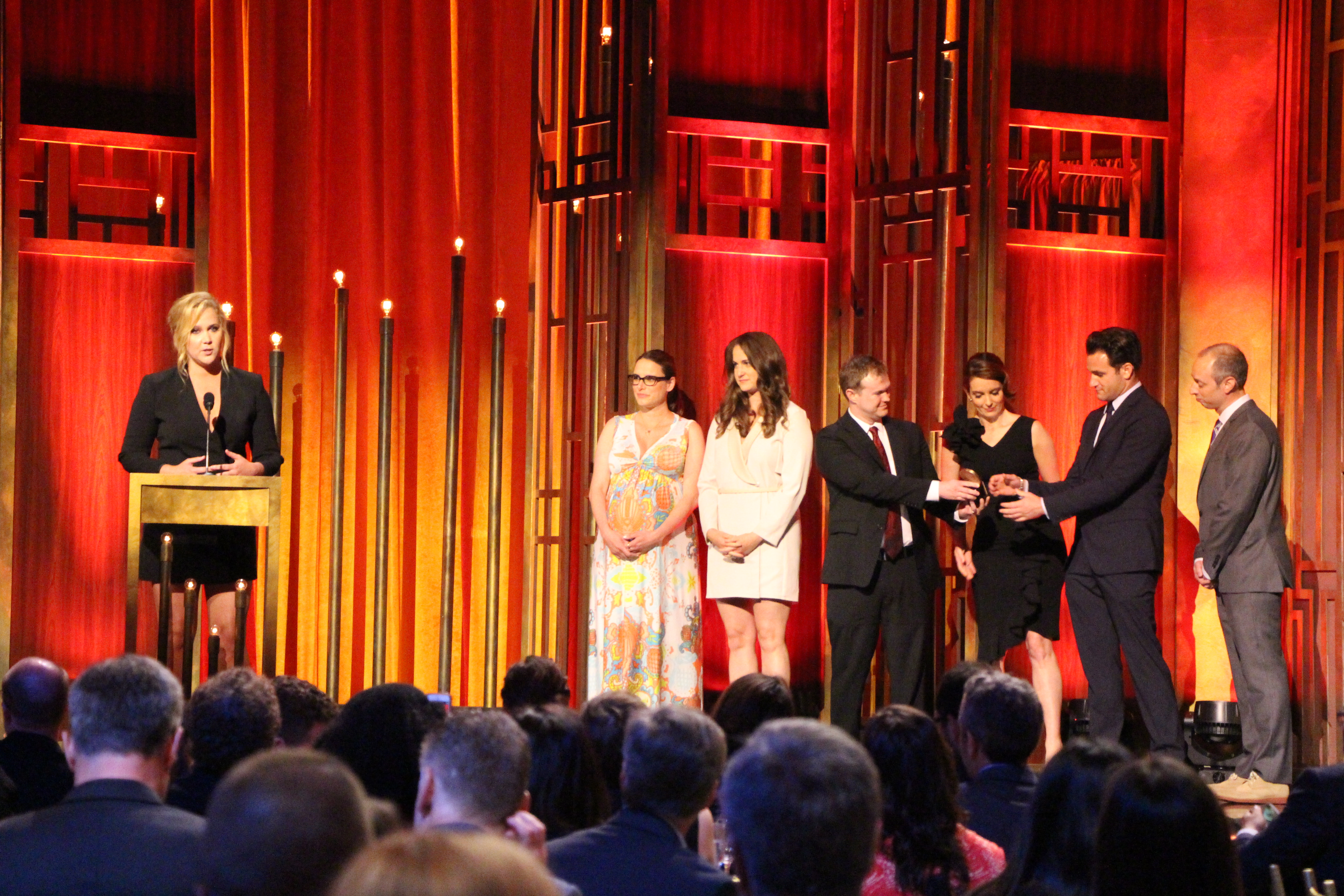
Amy Schumer appeared with the crew of Inside Amy Schumer at the 74th Annual Peabody Awards.

The show has been met with generally positive reviews. The first season received a weighted average score of 66 out of 100 on Metacritic based on eight critics, indicating "generally favorable reviews". Critics were even more positive for the second and third seasons, which received Metascores of 74 and 71 respectively. The third season also received a 100% approval rating on Rotten Tomatoes based on reviews from 10 critics, with an average rating of 10 out of 10. The site's critical consensus states, "Edgy and thought-provoking, Inside Amy Schumer's third season delivers more of the social relevance and self-deprecating wit that fans of the series have come to expect." The series was honored with a Peabody Award in 2015. The fourth season of the series received a score of 62 on Metacritic.

== International broadcast ==
In 2014, Inside Amy Schumer began to be broadcast in Australia by the ABC until 2020; later, it moved to 10 Shake. In the United Kingdom and Ireland, it is broadcast on Viacom networks, primarily Comedy Central, Comedy Central Extra and VH1.

== Accolades ==
Accolades for Inside Amy Schumer
Year	Association	Category	Nominee(s)	Result
2014	66th Primetime Emmy Awards	Outstanding Writing for a Variety Series	Emily Altman, Amy Schumer, Jeremy Beiler, Neil Casey, Kyle Dunnigan, Jessi Klein, Kurt Metzger, Christine Nangle	Nominated
2015	67th Primetime Emmy Awards	Outstanding Variety Sketch Series		Won
2015	67th Primetime Emmy Awards	Outstanding Lead Actress in a Comedy Series	Amy Schumer (Episode: "Cool With It")	Nominated
2015	67th Primetime Emmy Awards	Outstanding Guest Actor in a Comedy Series	Paul Giamatti (Episode: "12 Angry Men Inside Amy Schumer")	Nominated
2015	67th Primetime Emmy Awards	Outstanding Directing for a Variety Series	Amy Schumer & Ryan McFaul (Episode: "12 Angry Men Inside Amy Schumer")	Nominated
2015	67th Primetime Emmy Awards	Outstanding Single-Camera Picture Editing for a Comedy Series	(Episode: "Last Fuckable Day"); Nick Paley, Laura Weinberg, Jesse Gordon, Billy Song	Nominated
2015	67th Primetime Emmy Awards	Outstanding Writing for a Variety Series	Jessi Klein, Amy Schumer, Hallie Cantor, Kim Caramele, Kyle Dunnigan, Jon Glaser, Christine Nangle, Kurt Metzger, Daniel Powell, Tami Sagher	Nominated
2015	67th Primetime Emmy Awards	Outstanding Original Music and Lyrics	(Episode: "Cool With It"); Song: Girl You Don't Need Makeup; Music by Kyle Dunnigan & Jim Roach, Lyrics by Kyle Dunnigan	Won
2016	68th Primetime Emmy Awards	Outstanding Variety Sketch Series		Nominated
2016	68th Primetime Emmy Awards	Outstanding Lead Actress in a Comedy Series	Amy Schumer (Episode: "Welcome to the Gun Show")	Nominated
2016	68th Primetime Emmy Awards	Outstanding Directing for a Variety Series	Ryan McFaul (Episode: "Madonna/Whore")	Won
2016	68th Primetime Emmy Awards	Outstanding Writing for a Variety Series	Michael Lawrence, Amy Schumer, Jessi Klein, Daniel Powell, Christine Nangle, Kim Caramele, Kyle Dunnigan, Tami Sagher, Kurt Metzger, Claudia O'Doherty	Nominated
