= List of ended Netflix original programming (2016–2020) =

These shows are worldwide or regional Netflix Originals and have either completed their runs or Netflix stopped producing episodes. A show is also assumed to have ended if there has been no confirmed news of renewal at least one year after the show's last episode was released.

== Drama ==
Title	Genre	Premiere	Finale	Seasons	Runtime	Notes
Stranger Things	Science fiction horror	July 15, 2016	December 31, 2025	5 seasons, 42 episodes	42–150 min	
The Get Down	Musical drama	August 12, 2016	April 7, 2017	2 parts, 11 episodes	50–93 min	
Luke Cage	Neo-blaxploitation superhero	September 30, 2016	June 22, 2018	2 seasons, 26 episodes	46–69 min	(Note: These shows were available at a time as Netflix originals, but have been since removed from the service.)
The Crown	Historical drama	November 4, 2016	December 14, 2023	6 seasons, 60 episodes	39–72 min	
Gilmore Girls: A Year in the Life	Family drama	November 25, 2016		4 episodes	88–102 min	(Note: Miniseries)
The OA	Mystery	December 16, 2016	March 22, 2019	2 parts, 16 episodes	31–71 min	
Iron Fist	Superhero martial arts	March 17, 2017	September 7, 2018	2 seasons, 23 episodes	49–61 min	
13 Reasons Why	Teen drama mystery	March 31, 2017	June 5, 2020	4 seasons, 49 episodes	49–98 min	
Gypsy	Psychological thriller	June 30, 2017		1 season, 10 episodes	46–58 min	
Ozark	Crime drama	July 21, 2017	April 29, 2022	4 seasons, 44 episodes	50–80 min	
The Defenders	Superhero action/drama	August 18, 2017		8 episodes	44–57 min	
Mindhunter	Crime drama	October 13, 2017	August 16, 2019	2 seasons, 19 episodes	34–73 min	
The Punisher	Superhero drama	November 17, 2017	January 18, 2019	2 seasons, 26 episodes	47–58 min	
Godless	Western	November 22, 2017		7 episodes	41–80 min	
Altered Carbon	Science fiction	February 2, 2018	February 27, 2020	2 seasons, 18 episodes	43–66 min	
Seven Seconds	Crime drama	February 23, 2018		10 episodes	54–80 min	
The Innocents	Supernatural fiction	August 24, 2018		1 season, 8 episodes	46–56 min	
The Haunting of Hill House	Horror	October 12, 2018		10 episodes	43–71 min	
Chilling Adventures of Sabrina	Supernatural coming-of-age horror	October 26, 2018	December 31, 2020	4 parts, 36 episodes	50–64 min	
Narcos: Mexico	Crime drama	November 16, 2018	November 5, 2021	3 seasons, 30 episodes	45–70 min	
Tidelands	Supernatural crime drama	December 14, 2018		1 season, 8 episodes	36–48 min	
The Umbrella Academy	Superhero action	February 15, 2019	August 8, 2024	4 seasons, 36 episodes	40–69 min	
The Order	Supernatural horror drama	March 7, 2019	June 18, 2020	2 seasons, 20 episodes	42–51 min	
Black Summer	Apocalyptic fiction drama	April 11, 2019	June 17, 2021	2 seasons, 16 episodes	21–58 min	
Chambers	Teen psychological thriller	April 26, 2019		1 season, 10 episodes	38–51 min	
The Society	Mystery drama	May 10, 2019		1 season, 10 episodes	49–61 min	
What/If	Social thriller	May 24, 2019		1 season, 10 episodes	44–58 min	
When They See Us	Drama	May 31, 2019		4 episodes	64–88 min	
Armistead Maupin's Tales of the City	Drama	June 7, 2019		10 episodes	46–60 min	
Trinkets	Coming-of-age drama	June 14, 2019	August 25, 2020	2 seasons, 20 episodes	22–30 min	
Another Life	Science fiction drama	July 25, 2019	October 14, 2021	2 seasons, 20 episodes	36–61 min	
Wu Assassins	Supernatural martial arts drama	August 8, 2019		1 season, 10 episodes	40–51 min	
The I-Land	Science fiction thriller	September 12, 2019		7 episodes	37–43 min	
Unbelievable	Drama	September 13, 2019		8 episodes	44–59 min	
Criminal: UK	Police procedural anthology series	September 20, 2019	September 16, 2020	2 seasons, 7 episodes	41–47 min	
V Wars	Science fiction horror drama	December 5, 2019		1 season, 10 episodes	37–57 min	
Soundtrack	Musical drama	December 18, 2019		1 season, 10 episodes	52–61 min	
Messiah	Thriller	January 1, 2020		1 season, 10 episodes	38–55 min	
Spinning Out	Drama	January 1, 2020		1 season, 10 episodes	44–56 min	
October Faction	Horror	January 23, 2020		1 season, 10 episodes	36–49 min	
The Stranger	Thriller	January 30, 2020		8 episodes	42–52 min	
Locke & Key	Fantasy drama/Supernatural horror	February 7, 2020	August 10, 2022	3 seasons, 28 episodes	33–56 min	
Queen Sono	Crime drama	February 28, 2020		1 season, 6 episodes	32–47 min	
Self Made: Inspired by the Life of Madam C. J. Walker	Biopic	March 20, 2020		4 episodes	45–49 min	
The English Game	Historical drama	March 20, 2020		1 season, 6 episodes	43–55 min	
Unorthodox	Drama	March 26, 2020		4 episodes	52–55 min	
Outer Banks	Coming-of-age drama	April 15, 2020	August 20, 2026	5 seasons, 50 episodes	40–85 min	
Hollywood	Drama	May 1, 2020		1 season, 7 episodes	44–57 min	
The Eddy	Musical drama	May 8, 2020		8 episodes	54–69 min	
White Lines	Drama	May 15, 2020		1 season, 10 episodes	50–63 min	
Sweet Magnolias	Romantic drama	May 19, 2020	June 11, 2026	5 seasons, 50 episodes	43–54 min	
Blood & Water	Teen drama	May 20, 2020	March 1, 2024	4 seasons, 25 episodes	42–53 min	
Homemade	Anthology series	June 30, 2020		1 volume, 17 episodes	4–11 min	
Warrior Nun	Fantasy	July 2, 2020	November 10, 2022	2 seasons, 18 episodes	36–52 min	
Cursed	Fantasy	July 17, 2020		1 season, 10 episodes	48–59 min	
Young Wallander	Detective drama	September 3, 2020	February 17, 2022	2 seasons, 12 episodes	36–52 min	
Away	Science fiction	September 4, 2020		1 season, 10 episodes	44–57 min	
Ratched	Psychological thriller	September 18, 2020		1 season, 8 episodes	45–62 min	
The Haunting of Bly Manor	Horror/Gothic-Romance	October 9, 2020		9 episodes	45–66 min	
Social Distance	Anthology series	October 15, 2020		1 season, 8 episodes	18–23 min	
Grand Army	Teen drama	October 16, 2020		1 season, 9 episodes	47–72 min	
The Queen's Gambit	Coming-of-age period drama	October 23, 2020		7 episodes	46–67 min	
Dash & Lily	Romance	November 10, 2020		1 season, 8 episodes	23–27 min	
Kings of Jo'Burg	Fantasy crime drama	December 4, 2020	June 13, 2025	3 seasons, 21 episodes	37–68 min	
Tiny Pretty Things	Teen drama	December 14, 2020		1 season, 10 episodes	54–58 min	

== Comedy ==
Title	Genre	Premiere	Finale	Seasons	Runtime	Notes
Love	Romantic comedy	February 19, 2016	March 9, 2018	3 seasons, 34 episodes	24–40 min	
Flaked	Comedy	March 11, 2016	June 2, 2017	2 seasons, 14 episodes	30–34 min	
Netflix Presents: The Characters	Sketch comedy	March 11, 2016		1 season, 8 episodes	27–38 min	
The Ranch	Sitcom	April 1, 2016	January 24, 2020	8 parts, 80 episodes	25–36 min	
Lady Dynamite	Comedy	May 20, 2016	November 10, 2017	2 seasons, 20 episodes	26–36 min	
Easy	Romantic comedy anthology	September 22, 2016	May 10, 2019	3 seasons, 25 episodes	26–52 min	
Trailer Park Boys Out of the Park: Europe	Mockumentary	October 28, 2016		1 season, 8 episodes	22–30 min	
Santa Clarita Diet	Comedy horror	February 3, 2017	March 29, 2019	3 seasons, 30 episodes	26–35 min	
Girlboss	Comedy	April 21, 2017		1 season, 13 episodes	24–29 min	
Dear White People	Satirical comedy drama	April 28, 2017	September 22, 2021	4 volumes, 40 episodes	21–39 min	
GLOW	Comedy	June 23, 2017	August 9, 2019	3 seasons, 30 episodes	27–46 min	
Friends from College	Comedy	July 14, 2017	January 11, 2019	2 seasons, 16 episodes	26–34 min	
Wet Hot American Summer: Ten Years Later	Satirical comedy	August 4, 2017		8 episodes	24–31 min	
Atypical	Coming-of-age comedy	August 11, 2017	July 9, 2021	4 seasons, 38 episodes	26–38 min	
Disjointed	Comedy	August 25, 2017	January 12, 2018	2 parts, 20 episodes	23–32 min	
American Vandal	Mockumentary	September 15, 2017	September 14, 2018	2 seasons, 16 episodes	26–42 min	
She's Gotta Have It	Comedy drama	November 23, 2017	May 24, 2019	2 seasons, 19 episodes	32–38 min	
Trailer Park Boys Out of the Park: USA	Mockumentary	November 24, 2017		1 season, 8 episodes	23–35 min	
Everything Sucks!	Coming-of-age comedy drama	February 16, 2018		1 season, 10 episodes	23–27 min	
On My Block	Coming-of-age comedy	March 16, 2018	October 4, 2021	4 seasons, 38 episodes	23–38 min	
Insatiable	Dark comedy drama	August 10, 2018	October 11, 2019	2 seasons, 22 episodes	40–53 min	
Maniac	Dark comedy	September 21, 2018		10 episodes	27–47 min	
The Good Cop	Police procedural comedy drama	September 21, 2018		1 season, 10 episodes	43–49 min	
The Kominsky Method	Comedy	November 16, 2018	May 28, 2021	3 seasons, 22 episodes	22–37 min	
Sex Education	Comedy drama	January 11, 2019	September 21, 2023	4 seasons, 32 episodes	47–85 min	
Russian Doll	Comedy	February 1, 2019	April 20, 2022	2 seasons, 15 episodes	25–33 min	
After Life	Dark comedy drama	March 8, 2019	January 14, 2022	3 seasons, 18 episodes	25–35 min	
Turn Up Charlie	Comedy	March 15, 2019		1 season, 8 episodes	25–29 min	
Huge in France	Comedy	April 12, 2019		1 season, 8 episodes	28–34 min	
Special	Comedy	April 12, 2019	May 20, 2021	2 seasons, 16 episodes	12–34 min	
Lunatics	Comedy	April 19, 2019		1 season, 10 episodes	33–38 min	
I Think You Should Leave with Tim Robinson	Sketch comedy	April 23, 2019	May 30, 2023	3 seasons, 18 episodes	14–18 min	
Bonding	Dark comedy	April 24, 2019	January 27, 2021	2 seasons, 15 episodes	13–21 min	
Dead to Me	Black comedy drama	May 3, 2019	November 17, 2022	3 seasons, 30 episodes	26–39 min	
It's Bruno!	Comedy	May 17, 2019		1 season, 8 episodes	12–21 min	
Mr. Iglesias	Comedy	June 21, 2019	December 8, 2020	3 parts, 21 episodes	25–32 min	
The Politician	Comedy	September 27, 2019	June 19, 2020	2 seasons, 15 episodes	28–62 min	
Living with Yourself	Comedy drama	October 18, 2019		1 season, 8 episodes	22–36 min	
Daybreak	Dark comedy	October 24, 2019		1 season, 10 episodes	39–50 min	
Merry Happy Whatever	Comedy	November 28, 2019		1 season, 8 episodes	25–29 min	
Astronomy Club: The Sketch Show	Sketch comedy	December 6, 2019		1 season, 6 episodes	18–24 min	
AJ and the Queen	Comedy	January 10, 2020		1 season, 10 episodes	47–60 min	
Medical Police	Comedy	January 10, 2020		1 season, 10 episodes	21–29 min	
Gentefied	Comedy drama	February 21, 2020	November 10, 2021	2 seasons, 18 episodes	25–34 min	
I Am Not Okay with This	Coming-of-age comedy	February 26, 2020		1 season, 7 episodes	19–28 min	
The Iliza Shlesinger Sketch Show	Sketch comedy	April 1, 2020		1 season, 6 episodes	18–20 min	
Brews Brothers	Comedy	April 10, 2020		1 season, 8 episodes	26–30 min	
#blackAF	Sitcom	April 17, 2020		1 season, 8 episodes	32–48 min	
Never Have I Ever	Coming-of-age comedy drama	April 27, 2020	June 8, 2023	4 seasons, 40 episodes	22–32 min	
Space Force	Workplace comedy	May 29, 2020	February 18, 2022	2 seasons, 17 episodes	25–36 min	
Teenage Bounty Hunters	Comedy	August 14, 2020		1 season, 10 episodes	42–58 min	
The Duchess	Comedy	September 11, 2020		1 season, 6 episodes	19–28 min	
Sneakerheads	Comedy	September 25, 2020		1 season, 6 episodes	23–25 min	
Aunty Donna's Big Ol' House of Fun	Comedy	November 11, 2020		1 season, 6 episodes	17–23 min	
How to Ruin Christmas	Comedy	December 16, 2020	December 9, 2022	3 seasons, 10 episodes	42–57 min	

== Kids & family ==
Title	Genre	Premiere	Finale	Seasons	Runtime	Notes
Fuller House	Sitcom	February 26, 2016	June 2, 2020	5 seasons, 75 episodes	24–36 min	
Haters Back Off	Comedy	October 14, 2016	October 20, 2017	2 seasons, 16 episodes	24–36 min	
One Day at a Time	Sitcom	January 6, 2017	February 8, 2019	3 seasons, 39 episodes	25–35 min	(Note: These shows were cancelled by Netflix, but were picked up by another channel or streaming service for additional seasons.)
A Series of Unfortunate Events	Black comedy mystery	January 13, 2017	January 1, 2019	3 seasons, 25 episodes	36–64 min	
Julie's Greenroom	Educational	March 17, 2017		1 season, 13 episodes	27–34 min	
Free Rein	Teen drama	June 22, 2017	July 6, 2019	3 seasons, 30 episodes	25–34 min	
Greenhouse Academy	Science fiction teen drama	September 8, 2017	March 20, 2020	4 seasons, 40 episodes	20–28 min	
Alexa & Katie	Sitcom	March 23, 2018	June 13, 2020	4 seasons, 39 episodes	22–37 min	
Lost in Space	Science fiction	April 13, 2018	December 1, 2021	3 seasons, 28 episodes	39–66 min	
The Who Was? Show	Educational	May 11, 2018		1 season, 13 episodes	23–27 min	
All About the Washingtons	Comedy	August 10, 2018		1 season, 10 episodes	22–27 min	
The Ponysitters Club	Drama	August 10, 2018	November 16, 2018	2 seasons, 20 episodes	23 min	
Best.Worst.Weekend.Ever.	Comedy	October 19, 2018		1 season, 8 episodes	22–28 min	
Brainchild	Educational	November 2, 2018		1 season, 13 episodes	22–25 min	
Prince of Peoria	Sitcom	November 16, 2018	May 20, 2019	2 parts, 16 episodes	24–28 min	
No Good Nick	Sitcom	April 15, 2019	August 5, 2019	2 parts, 20 episodes	26–32 min	
Malibu Rescue: The Series	Comedy	June 3, 2019		1 season, 8 episodes	22–26 min	
Family Reunion	Sitcom	July 10, 2019	October 27, 2022	5 parts, 44 episodes	24–34 min	
The Dark Crystal: Age of Resistance	Fantasy	August 30, 2019		1 season, 10 episodes	47–61 min	
Team Kaylie	Sitcom	September 23, 2019	February 3, 2020	3 parts, 20 episodes	22–30 min	
Raising Dion	Superhero/science fiction drama	October 4, 2019	February 1, 2022	2 seasons, 17 episodes	37–51 min	
Dolly Parton's Heartstrings	Anthology series	November 22, 2019		1 season, 8 episodes	57–86 min	
The Healing Powers of Dude	Family comedy	January 13, 2020		1 season, 8 episodes	23–28 min	
Ashley Garcia: Genius in Love	Comedy	February 17, 2020	December 9, 2020	3 parts, 15 episodes	26–35 min	
The Letter for the King	Fantasy	March 20, 2020		1 season, 6 episodes	40–51 min	
The Big Show Show	Comedy	April 6, 2020	December 9, 2020	2 parts, 9 episodes	24–28 min	
The Baby-Sitters Club	Comedy drama	July 3, 2020	October 11, 2021	2 seasons, 18 episodes	24–29 min	
Emily's Wonder Lab	Educational	August 25, 2020		1 season, 10 episodes	11–14 min	
Bookmarks	Educational	September 1, 2020		1 collection, 12 episodes	3–11 min	
Julie and the Phantoms	Musical comedy	September 10, 2020		1 season, 9 episodes	27–38 min	
Izzy's Koala World	Educational	September 15, 2020	April 20, 2021	2 seasons, 16 episodes	14–18 min	
Selena: The Series	Biopic	December 4, 2020	May 4, 2021	2 parts, 18 episodes	31–41 min	

== Animation ==
=== Adult animation ===
Title	Genre	Premiere	Finale	Seasons	Runtime	Language	Notes
Neo Yokio	Science fantasy comedy	September 22, 2017	December 7, 2018	2 seasons, 7 episodes	20–65 min	English	
Big Mouth	Coming-of-age comedy	September 29, 2017	May 23, 2025	8 seasons, 81 episodes	25–46 min	English	
Disenchantment	Medieval fantasy comedy	August 17, 2018	September 1, 2023	5 parts, 50 episodes	19–44 min	English	
Paradise PD	Crime comedy	August 31, 2018	December 16, 2022	4 parts, 40 episodes	23–30 min	English	
Super Drags	Superhero comedy	November 9, 2018		1 season, 5 episodes	23–26 min	Portuguese	
Love, Death & Robots	Anthology	March 15, 2019	May 15, 2025	4 volumes, 45 episodes	6–21 min	English	
Trailer Park Boys: The Animated Series	Mockumentary	March 31, 2019	May 22, 2020	2 seasons, 20 episodes	23–26 min	English	
Tuca & Bertie	Comedy	May 3, 2019		1 season, 10 episodes	25–26 min	English	
The Midnight Gospel	Science fantasy	April 20, 2020		1 season, 8 episodes	20–36 min	English	
Hoops	Sitcom	August 21, 2020		1 season, 10 episodes	23–26 min	English	
The Liberator	War drama	November 11, 2020		1 season, 4 episodes	45–56 min	English	

=== Anime ===
Title	Genre	Premiere	Finale	Seasons	Runtime	Language	Notes
Castlevania	Dark fantasy action	July 7, 2017	May 13, 2021	4 seasons, 32 episodes	22–31 min	English	
Devilman Crybaby	Supernatural horror	January 5, 2018		10 episodes	24–28 min	Japanese	
B: The Beginning	Suspense	March 2, 2018	March 18, 2021	2 seasons, 18 episodes	23–27 min	Japanese	
A.I.C.O. -Incarnation-	Science fiction	March 9, 2018		1 season, 12 episodes	25–29 min	Japanese	
Sword Gai: The Animation	Supernatural	March 23, 2018	July 30, 2018	2 seasons, 24 episodes	22–23 min	Japanese	
Lost Song	Musical fantasy	March 31, 2018	June 16, 2018	1 season, 12 episodes	23–24 min	Japanese	
Aggretsuko	Workplace comedy	April 20, 2018	February 16, 2023	5 seasons, 50 episodes	15–33 min	Japanese	
Baki	Martial arts	June 25, 2018	June 4, 2020	2 seasons, 39 episodes	24 min	Japanese	
Hero Mask	Crime	December 3, 2018	August 23, 2019	2 parts, 24 episodes	25 min	Japanese	
Ultraman	Science fiction/Tokusatsu	April 1, 2019	May 11, 2023	3 seasons, 31 episodes	23–28 min	Japanese	
Rilakkuma and Kaoru	Stop motion/Slice of life	April 19, 2019		1 season, 13 episodes	11–14 min	Japanese	
7 Seeds	Science fiction	June 28, 2019	March 26, 2020	2 parts, 24 episodes	24–26 min	Japanese	
Knights of the Zodiac: Saint Seiya	Action	July 19, 2019	January 23, 2020	2 parts, 12 episodes	23 min	Japanese	
Kengan Ashura	Martial arts	July 31, 2019	August 15, 2024	2 seasons, 52 episodes	24–27 min	Japanese	
Cannon Busters	Fantasy	August 15, 2019		1 season, 12 episodes	24–27 min	Japanese	
Seis Manos	Supernatural/Action	October 3, 2019		1 season, 8 episodes	25–28 min	English	
Dino Girl Gauko	Children's series	November 22, 2019	March 20, 2020	2 seasons, 39 episodes	9 min	Japanese	
Levius	Science fiction/Action	November 28, 2019		1 season, 12 episodes	24–27 min	Japanese	
The Disastrous Life of Saiki K.: Reawakened	Supernatural comedy	December 30, 2019		1 season, 6 episodes	23 min	Japanese	
Cagaster of an Insect Cage	Science fiction	February 6, 2020		1 season, 12 episodes	25–33 min	Japanese	
Ghost in the Shell: SAC 2045	Science fiction	April 23, 2020	May 23, 2022	2 seasons, 24 episodes	25–28 min	Japanese	
Japan Sinks: 2020	Disaster	July 9, 2020		1 season, 10 episodes	25–32 min	Japanese	
Transformers: War for Cybertron Trilogy: Siege	Science fiction	July 30, 2020		1 season, 6 episodes	23–24 min	English	
The Idhun Chronicles	Fantasy/Action	September 10, 2020	January 8, 2021	2 parts, 10 episodes	25–27 min	Spanish	
Dragon's Dogma	Dark fantasy/Adventure	September 17, 2020		1 season, 7 episodes	19–32 min	English	
Blood of Zeus	Fantasy action	October 27, 2020	May 8, 2025	3 seasons, 24 episodes	23–37 min	English	
Transformers: War for Cybertron Trilogy: Earthrise	Science fiction	December 30, 2020		1 season, 6 episodes	24–25 min	English	

=== Kids & family ===
Title	Premiere	Finale	Seasons	Runtime	Language	Notes
Lego Bionicle: The Journey to One	March 4, 2016	July 29, 2016	2 seasons, 5 episodes	22 min	English	
Lego Friends: The Power of Friendship	March 4, 2016	June 10, 2016	2 seasons, 4 episodes	22 min	English	
Kong: King of the Apes	April 15, 2016	May 4, 2018	2 seasons, 23 episodes	22–85 min	English	
Word Party	July 8, 2016	March 2, 2021	5 seasons, 60 episodes	13–14 min	English	
Ask the StoryBots	August 12, 2016	August 2, 2019	3 seasons, 22 episodes	20–29 min	English	
Kulipari: An Army of Frogs	September 2, 2016		1 season, 13 episodes	22–23 min	English	
Skylanders Academy	October 28, 2016	September 28, 2018	3 seasons, 38 episodes	24–44 min	English	
Luna Petunia	December 9, 2016	November 17, 2017	3 seasons, 22 episodes	23–24 min	English	
Trollhunters: Tales of Arcadia	December 23, 2016	May 25, 2018	3 parts, 52 episodes	23 min	English	
Edgar Rice Burroughs' Tarzan and Jane	January 6, 2017	October 12, 2018	2 seasons, 13 episodes	22 min	English	
We're Lalaloopsy	January 10, 2017		1 season, 13 episodes	22 min	English	
Legend Quest	February 24, 2017		1 season, 13 episodes	22 min	English	
Buddy Thunderstruck	March 10, 2017		1 season, 12 episodes	13–24 min	English	
True and the Rainbow Kingdom	August 11, 2017	August 30, 2019	3 seasons, 19 episodes	24 min	English	
Lego Elves: Secrets of Elvendale	September 1, 2017		1 season, 8 episodes	24–25 min	English	
The Magic School Bus Rides Again	September 29, 2017	April 13, 2018	2 seasons, 26 episodes	25 min	English	
Super Monsters	October 13, 2017	October 4, 2019	3 seasons, 22 episodes	22–24 min	English	
Stretch Armstrong and the Flex Fighters	November 17, 2017	September 7, 2018	2 seasons, 23 episodes	23 min	English	
Llama Llama	January 26, 2018	November 15, 2019	2 seasons, 25 episodes	24–25 min	English	
Luna Petunia: Return to Amazia	February 2, 2018	July 20, 2018	2 seasons, 11 episodes	24 min	English	
The Boss Baby: Back in Business	April 6, 2018	November 17, 2020	4 seasons, 49 episodes	24 min	English	
Spy Kids: Mission Critical	April 20, 2018	November 30, 2018	2 seasons, 20 episodes	23–25 min	English	
The Hollow	June 8, 2018	May 8, 2020	2 seasons, 20 episodes	23–24 min	English	
True: Magical Friends	June 15, 2018		1 season, 5 episodes	24 min	English	
True: Wonderful Wishes	June 15, 2018		1 season, 5 episodes	24 min	English	
Harvey Girls Forever!	June 29, 2018	January 10, 2020	4 seasons, 52 episodes	24 min	English	
The Epic Tales of Captain Underpants	July 13, 2018	July 19, 2019	3 seasons, 39 episodes	24 min	English	
Cupcake & Dino: General Services	July 27, 2018	May 3, 2019	2 seasons, 26 episodes	22–23 min	English	
The Dragon Prince	September 14, 2018	December 19, 2024	7 seasons, 63 episodes	24–33 min	English	
Hilda	September 21, 2018	December 7, 2023	3 seasons, 34 episodes	24–77 min	English	
Larva Island	October 19, 2018	March 1, 2019	2 seasons, 26 episodes	8 min	English	
She-Ra and the Princesses of Power	November 13, 2018	May 15, 2020	5 seasons, 52 episodes	24 min	English	
Kulipari: Dream Walker	November 20, 2018		1 season, 10 episodes	23 min	English	
Motown Magic	November 20, 2018	June 28, 2019	2 seasons, 51 episodes	15–26 min	English	
3Below: Tales of Arcadia	December 21, 2018	July 12, 2019	2 parts, 26 episodes	23–24 min	English	
Pinky Malinky	January 1, 2019	July 17, 2019	3 parts, 59 episodes	12–23 min	English	
Carmen Sandiego	January 18, 2019	January 15, 2021	4 seasons, 32 episodes	23–33 min	English	
YooHoo to the Rescue	March 15, 2019	March 25, 2020	3 seasons, 52 episodes	12–14 min	English	
Charlie's Colorforms City	March 22, 2019	June 13, 2022	6 seasons, 34 episodes	14–25 min	English	
Mighty Little Bheem	April 12, 2019	September 18, 2020	3 seasons, 64 episodes	6–7 min	No dialogue	
Twelve Forever	July 29, 2019		1 season, 25 episodes	14–24 min	English	
Spirit Riding Free: Pony Tales	August 9, 2019	October 18, 2019	2 collections, 10 episodes	4–24 min	English	
Archibald's Next Big Thing	September 6, 2019	March 20, 2020	2 seasons, 26 episodes	24 min	English	
The Last Kids on Earth	September 17, 2019	October 16, 2020	3 books, 21 episodes	23–67 min	English	
Dragons: Rescue Riders	September 27, 2019	February 7, 2020	2 seasons, 26 episodes	24 min	English	
Legend Quest: Masters of Myth	October 5, 2019		1 season, 13 episodes	24 min	English	
Hello Ninja	November 1, 2019	January 19, 2021	4 seasons, 39 episodes	11–23 min	English	
Green Eggs and Ham	November 8, 2019	April 8, 2022	2 seasons, 23 episodes	24–30 min	English	
Fast & Furious Spy Racers	December 26, 2019	December 17, 2021	6 seasons, 52 episodes	23–24 min	English	
Go! Go! Cory Carson	January 4, 2020	October 21, 2021	6 seasons, 63 episodes	7–11 min	English	
Kipo and the Age of Wonderbeasts	January 14, 2020	October 12, 2020	3 seasons, 30 episodes	23–24 min	English	
Glitch Techs	February 21, 2020	August 17, 2020	2 seasons, 19 episodes	23–46 min	English	
Buddi	March 20, 2020	September 11, 2020	2 seasons, 16 episodes	12 min	English	
Spirit Riding Free: Riding Academy	April 3, 2020	September 4, 2020	2 parts, 16 episodes	24 min	English	
StarBeam	April 3, 2020	June 29, 2021	4 seasons, 41 episodes	4–32 min	English	
Chico Bon Bon: Monkey with a Tool Belt	May 8, 2020	October 27, 2020	4 seasons, 38 episodes	14 min	English	
Rhyme Time Town	June 19, 2020	June 15, 2021	2 seasons, 21 episodes	24 min.	English	
The Epic Tales of Captain Underpants in Space	July 10, 2020		1 season, 6 episodes	24 min	English	
Wizards: Tales of Arcadia	August 7, 2020		10 episodes	23–24 min	English	
Jurassic World Camp Cretaceous	September 18, 2020	July 21, 2022	5 seasons, 49 episodes	23–24 min	English	
Mighty Express	September 22, 2020	August 29, 2022	7 seasons, 44 episodes	14–43 min	English	

== Non-English language scripted ==
=== Arabic ===
Title	Genre	Premiere	Finale	Seasons	Runtime	Notes
Jinn	Fantasy adventure	June 13, 2019		1 season, 5 episodes	25–47 min	
Dollar	Thriller	August 8, 2019		1 season, 15 episodes	39–45 min	
Paranormal	Supernatural drama	November 5, 2020		1 season, 6 episodes	46–55 min	

=== French ===
Title	Genre	Premiere	Finale	Seasons	Runtime	Notes
Marseille	Political drama	May 5, 2016	February 23, 2018	2 seasons, 16 episodes	35–53 min	
The Hook Up Plan	Romantic comedy	December 7, 2018	January 1, 2022	3 seasons, 21 episodes	22–49 min	
Osmosis	Science fiction/drama	March 29, 2019		1 season, 8 episodes	41–45 min	
Family Business	Comedy	June 28, 2019	October 8, 2021	3 seasons, 18 episodes	27–39 min	
Marianne	Horror drama	September 13, 2019		1 season, 8 episodes	37–52 min	
Criminal: France	Police procedural anthology series	September 20, 2019		3 episodes	38–43 min	
Mortel	Supernatural drama	November 21, 2019	July 2, 2021	2 seasons, 12 episodes	46–54 min	
Vampires	Supernatural drama	March 20, 2020		1 season, 6 episodes	37–44 min	
Into the Night	Science fiction	May 1, 2020	September 8, 2021	2 seasons, 12 episodes	32–40 min	
La Révolution	Supernatural drama	October 16, 2020		1 season, 8 episodes	39–57 min	

=== German ===
Title	Genre	Premiere	Finale	Seasons	Runtime	Notes
Dark	Science fiction	December 1, 2017	June 27, 2020	3 seasons, 26 episodes	45–73 min	
Dogs of Berlin	Drama	December 7, 2018		1 season, 10 episodes	51–62 min	
How to Sell Drugs Online (Fast)	Dark comedy	May 31, 2019	April 8, 2025	4 seasons, 24 episodes	24–39 min	
Criminal: Germany	Police procedural anthology series	September 20, 2019		3 episodes	41–46 min	
Skylines	Drama	September 27, 2019		1 season, 6 episodes	47–66 min	
We Are the Wave	Drama	November 1, 2019		1 season, 6 episodes	45–53 min	
Holiday Secrets	Drama	November 20, 2019		3 episodes	34–42 min	
Biohackers	Thriller	August 20, 2020	July 9, 2021	2 seasons, 12 episodes	40–46 min	
The Last Word	Comedy drama	September 17, 2020		1 season, 6 episodes	30–49 min	
Barbarians	Historical drama	October 23, 2020	October 21, 2022	2 seasons, 12 episodes	41–54 min	
Over Christmas	Comedy	November 27, 2020		3 episodes	44–50 min	

=== Hindi ===
Title	Genre	Premiere	Finale	Seasons	Runtime	Notes
Sacred Games	Drama	July 6, 2018	August 15, 2019	2 seasons, 16 episodes	43–58 min	
Ghoul	Horror	August 24, 2018		1 season, 3 episodes	44–50 min	
Selection Day	Drama	December 28, 2018	April 19, 2019	1 season, 12 episodes	19–28 min	
Delhi Crime	Police procedural	March 22, 2019	November 13, 2025	3 seasons, 18 episodes	36–64 min	
Leila	Drama	June 14, 2019		1 season, 6 episodes	40–54 min	
Typewriter	Horror	July 19, 2019		1 season, 5 episodes	43–52 min	
Bard of Blood	Espionage thriller	September 27, 2019		1 season, 7 episodes	41–50 min	
Jamtara – Sabka Number Ayega	Crime drama	January 10, 2020	September 23, 2022	2 seasons, 18 episodes	23–54 min	
Taj Mahal 1989	Romantic comedy	February 14, 2020		1 season, 7 episodes	31–36 min	
She	Crime drama	March 20, 2020	June 17, 2022	2 seasons, 14 episodes	31–51 min	
Hasmukh	Comedy	April 17, 2020		1 season, 10 episodes	29–39 min	
Betaal	Thriller	May 24, 2020		1 season, 4 episodes	45–49 min	
Masaba Masaba	Drama	August 28, 2020	July 29, 2022	2 seasons, 13 episodes	25–42 min	
Bhaag Beanie Bhaag	Romantic comedy	December 4, 2020		1 season, 6 episodes	26–32 min	

=== Italian ===
Title	Genre	Premiere	Finale	Seasons	Runtime	Notes
Suburra: Blood on Rome	Crime drama	October 6, 2017	October 30, 2020	3 seasons, 24 episodes	40–53 min	
Baby	Drama	November 30, 2018	September 16, 2020	3 seasons, 18 episodes	40–51 min	
Luna Nera	Historical drama	January 31, 2020		1 season, 6 episodes	40–56 min	
Summertime	Teen drama	April 29, 2020	May 4, 2022	3 seasons, 24 episodes	34–54 min	
Curon	Supernatural drama	June 10, 2020		1 season, 7 episodes	41–51 min	

=== Japanese ===
Title	Genre	Premiere	Finale	Seasons	Runtime	Notes
Hibana: Spark	Drama	June 2, 2016		1 season, 10 episodes	46–60 min	
Midnight Diner: Tokyo Stories	Slice of life/Anthology series	October 21, 2016	October 31, 2019	2 seasons, 20 episodes	23–26 min	
Samurai Gourmet	Slice of life comedy	March 17, 2017		1 season, 12 episodes	16–24 min	
Blazing Transfer Students	Action comedy	November 10, 2017		1 season, 8 episodes	23–28 min	
Erased	Supernatural mystery	December 15, 2017		1 season, 12 episodes	26–32 min	
Jimmy: The True Story of a True Idiot	Comedy	July 20, 2018		1 season, 9 episodes	39–64 min	
Switched	Science fiction	August 1, 2018		1 season, 6 episodes	33–44 min	
The Naked Director	Period comedy drama	August 8, 2019	June 24, 2021	2 seasons, 16 episodes	39–57 min	
Followers	Drama	February 27, 2020		1 season, 9 episodes	33–46 min	
The Forest of Love: Deep Cut	Drama	April 30, 2020		7 episodes	31–51 min	
Ju-On: Origins	Horror	July 3, 2020		1 season, 6 episodes	26–31 min	
Alice in Borderland	Fantasy thriller	December 10, 2020	September 25, 2025	3 seasons, 22 episodes	41–80 min	

=== Korean ===
Title	Genre	Premiere	Finale	Seasons	Runtime	Notes
My Only Love Song	Comedy	June 9, 2017		1 season, 20 episodes	27–30 min	
YG Future Strategy Office	Comedy	October 5, 2018		1 season, 8 episodes	20–29 min	
Kingdom	Period horror thriller	January 25, 2019	March 13, 2020	2 seasons, 12 episodes	36–57 min	
Persona	Anthology	April 11, 2019		1 season, 4 episodes	19–27 min	
My First First Love	Romantic comedy	April 18, 2019	July 26, 2019	2 seasons, 16 episodes	42–56 min	
Love Alarm	Romance drama	August 22, 2019	March 12, 2021	2 seasons, 14 episodes	42–71 min	
My Holo Love	Science fiction romance	February 7, 2020		12 episodes	49–57 min	
Extracurricular	Teen/crime drama	April 29, 2020		1 season, 10 episodes	44–72 min	
The School Nurse Files	Fantasy drama	September 25, 2020		1 season, 6 episodes	45–57 min	
Sweet Home	Apocalyptic horror	December 18, 2020	July 19, 2024	3 seasons, 26 episodes	44–87 min	

=== Mandarin ===
Title	Genre	Premiere	Finale	Seasons	Runtime	Notes
Nowhere Man	Thriller	October 31, 2019		1 season, 8 episodes	33–67 min	
Triad Princess	Crime drama/romance	December 6, 2019		1 season, 6 episodes	35–47 min	
The Ghost Bride	Mystery drama	January 23, 2020		1 season, 6 episodes	48–57 min	
The Victims' Game	Thriller	April 30, 2020	June 21, 2024	2 seasons, 16 episodes	51–67 min	

=== Portuguese ===
Title	Genre	Premiere	Finale	Seasons	Runtime	Notes
3%	Science fiction	November 25, 2016	August 14, 2020	4 seasons, 33 episodes	36–74 min	
The Mechanism	Crime drama	March 23, 2018	May 10, 2019	2 seasons, 16 episodes	39–55 min	
Samantha!	Comedy	July 6, 2018	April 19, 2019	2 seasons, 14 episodes	24–37 min	
Girls from Ipanema	Period drama	March 22, 2019	June 19, 2020	2 seasons, 13 episodes	35–56 min	
The Chosen One	Thriller drama	June 28, 2019	December 6, 2019	2 seasons, 12 episodes	40–54 min	
Sintonia	Crime teen drama	August 9, 2019	February 5, 2025	5 seasons, 32 episodes	37–63 min	
Brotherhood	Crime drama	October 25, 2019	May 11, 2022	2 seasons, 14 episodes	45–57 min	
Nobody's Looking	Comedy drama	November 22, 2019		1 season, 8 episodes	19–30 min	
Omniscient	Science fiction	January 29, 2020		1 season, 6 episodes	38–52 min	
Reality Z	Zombie horror	June 10, 2020		1 season, 10 episodes	25–36 min	
Kissing Game	Thriller	July 17, 2020		1 season, 6 episodes	32–49 min	
Good Morning, Verônica	Crime drama	October 1, 2020	February 14, 2024	3 seasons, 17 episodes	41–61 min	

=== Spanish ===
Title	Genre	Premiere	Finale	Seasons	Runtime	Notes
Ingobernable	Political drama	March 24, 2017	September 14, 2018	2 seasons, 27 episodes	32–50 min	
Cable Girls	Period drama	April 28, 2017	July 3, 2020	5 seasons, 42 episodes	35–63 min	
Edha	Drama	March 16, 2018		1 season, 10 episodes	38–43 min	
Club de Cuervos Presents: The Ballad of Hugo Sánchez	Comedy	June 17, 2018		1 season, 6 episodes	29–37 min	
The House of Flowers	Comedy	August 10, 2018	April 23, 2020	3 seasons, 33 episodes	24–40 min	
Elite	Crime teen drama	October 5, 2018	July 26, 2024	8 seasons, 64 episodes	40–61 min	
Diablero	Horror fantasy thriller	December 21, 2018	January 31, 2020	2 seasons, 14 episodes	32–44 min	
Always a Witch	Supernatural drama	February 1, 2019	February 28, 2020	2 seasons, 18 episodes	32–43 min	
Crime Diaries: The Candidate	Crime anthology series	March 22, 2019		8 episodes	32–48 min	
Crime Diaries: Night Out	Crime anthology series	May 3, 2019		1 season, 8 episodes	38–48 min	
High Seas	Mystery period drama	May 24, 2019	August 7, 2020	3 seasons, 22 episodes	38–49 min	
Yankee	Drama	June 14, 2019		1 season, 25 episodes	36–44 min	
Green Frontier	Crime drama/thriller	August 16, 2019		8 episodes	30–48 min	
Monarca	Family drama	September 13, 2019	January 1, 2021	2 seasons, 18 episodes	40–51 min	
Criminal: Spain	Police procedural anthology	September 20, 2019		3 episodes	39–41 min	
Hache	Thriller	November 1, 2019	February 5, 2021	2 seasons, 14 episodes	40–52 min	
The Club	Crime drama	November 15, 2019		1 season, 25 episodes	26–37 min	
Three Days of Christmas	Drama	December 6, 2019		1 season, 3 episodes	54–67 min	
The Neighbor	Superhero comedy	December 31, 2019	May 21, 2021	2 seasons, 18 episodes	25–33 min	
Puerta 7	Sports crime drama	February 21, 2020		1 season, 8 episodes	35–45 min	
Unstoppable	Comedy drama	February 28, 2020		1 season, 10 episodes	35–44 min	
Almost Happy	Comedy	May 1, 2020	April 13, 2022	2 seasons, 18 episodes	21–35 min	
Valeria	Comedy drama	May 8, 2020	February 14, 2025	4 seasons, 30 episodes	37–46 min	
The Unremarkable Juanquini	Comedy	May 15, 2020	April 30, 2021	2 seasons, 15 episodes	24–37 min	
Control Z	Teen drama	May 22, 2020	July 6, 2022	3 seasons, 24 episodes	34–44 min	
The Search	Crime anthology series	June 12, 2020		6 episodes	38–44 min	
Dark Desire	Thriller	July 15, 2020	February 2, 2022	2 seasons, 33 episodes	30–39 min	
The Great Heist	Crime drama	August 14, 2020		6 episodes	37–48 min	
Someone Has to Die	Drama	October 16, 2020		3 episodes	48–52 min	
The Minions of Midas	Thriller	November 13, 2020		6 episodes	49–57 min	
The Mess You Leave Behind	Drama	December 11, 2020		8 episodes	35–56 min	

=== Turkish ===
Title	Genre	Premiere	Finale	Seasons	Runtime	Notes
The Protector	Supernatural mystery	December 14, 2018	July 9, 2020	4 seasons, 32 episodes	31–51 min	
The Gift	Supernatural drama	December 27, 2019	June 17, 2021	3 seasons, 24 episodes	36–55 min	
Love 101	Teen drama	April 24, 2020	September 30, 2021	2 seasons, 16 episodes	33–52 min	

=== Other ===
Title	Genre	Premiere	Finale	Seasons	Runtime	Language	Notes
The Rain	Post-apocalyptic drama	May 4, 2018	August 6, 2020	3 seasons, 20 episodes	35–49 min	Danish	
1983	Spy thriller	November 30, 2018		1 season, 8 episodes	50–63 min	Polish	
Quicksand	Crime drama	April 5, 2019		6 episodes	41–49 min	Swedish	
The Stranded	Fantasy drama	November 14, 2019		1 season, 7 episodes	46–53 min	Thai	
Ares	Horror drama	January 17, 2020		1 season, 8 episodes	24–33 min	Dutch	
Ragnarok	Fantasy superhero drama	January 31, 2020	August 24, 2023	3 seasons, 18 episodes	38–54 min	Norwegian	
Bloodride	Horror anthology	March 13, 2020		1 season, 6 episodes	27–33 min	Norwegian	
The Woods	Thriller	June 12, 2020		1 season, 6 episodes	46–55 min	Polish	
Love & Anarchy	Romantic comedy	November 4, 2020	June 16, 2022	2 seasons, 16 episodes	25–36 min	Swedish	
Paava Kadhaigal	Drama anthology series	December 18, 2020		4 episodes	33–38 min	Tamil	
Equinox	Thriller	December 30, 2020		1 season, 6 episodes	43–52 min	Danish	

== Unscripted ==
=== Docuseries ===
Title	Subject	Premiere	Finale	Seasons	Runtime	Language	Notes
Chelsea Does	Society	January 23, 2016		1 season, 4 episodes	62–74 min	English	
Cooked	Food/Culinary art	February 19, 2016		4 episodes	50–58 min	English	
Last Chance U	Sports	July 29, 2016	July 28, 2020	5 parts, 38 episodes	46–76 min	English	
Fearless	Sports	August 19, 2016		6 episodes	50–58 min	English	
Chef's Table: France	Food/Culinary art	September 2, 2016		4 episodes	41–54 min	English	
Roman Empire	History	November 11, 2016	April 5, 2019	3 seasons, 15 episodes	38–48 min	English	
Captive	True crime	December 9, 2016		8 episodes	59–73 min	English	
Abstract: The Art of Design	Biography	February 10, 2017	September 25, 2019	2 seasons, 14 episodes	41–48 min	English	
Five Came Back	History	March 31, 2017		3 episodes	59–69 min	English	
Hot Girls Wanted: Turned On	Sex industry	April 21, 2017		6 episodes	41–58 min	English	
The Keepers	True crime	May 19, 2017		7 episodes	56–66 min	English	
Daughters of Destiny	Society	July 28, 2017		4 episodes	56–65 min	English	
Fire Chasers	Professions	September 8, 2017		4 episodes	50–58 min	English	
The Confession Tapes	True crime	September 8, 2017	June 21, 2019	2 seasons, 11 episodes	41–54 min	English	
Jack Whitehall: Travels with My Father	Travel	September 22, 2017	September 14, 2021	5 seasons, 18 episodes	28–61 min	English	
The Day I Met El Chapo	Biography	October 20, 2017		1 season, 3 episodes	48–61 min	Spanish	
Shot in the Dark	True crime	November 17, 2017		1 season, 8 episodes	34–41 min	English	
Wormwood	True crime	December 15, 2017		6 chapters	41–48 min	English	
72 Dangerous Animals: Latin America	Nature	December 22, 2017		12 episodes	41–46 min	English	
Dope	Drugs	December 22, 2017	June 28, 2019	3 seasons, 12 episodes	36–48 min	English	
The Toys That Made Us	Toy industry	December 22, 2017	November 15, 2019	3 seasons, 12 episodes	43–51 min	English	
Rotten	Food industry	January 5, 2018	October 4, 2019	2 seasons, 12 episodes	48–63 min	English	
Somebody Feed Phil	Travel	January 12, 2018	June 18, 2025	8 seasons, 49 episodes	32–63 min	English	
Drug Lords	Drugs	January 19, 2018	July 10, 2018	2 seasons, 8 episodes	42–47 min	English	
Dirty Money	Finance	January 26, 2018	March 11, 2020	2 seasons, 12 episodes	50–77 min	English	
First Team: Juventus	Sports	February 16, 2018	July 6, 2018	1 season, 6 episodes	37–42 min	English	
Ugly Delicious	Food/Culinary art	February 23, 2018	March 6, 2020	2 seasons, 12 episodes	46–55 min	English	
Flint Town	Professions	March 2, 2018		8 episodes	35–48 min	English	
Girls Incarcerated	Society	March 2, 2018	June 21, 2019	2 seasons, 16 episodes	37–47 min	English	
Wild Wild Country	Biography	March 16, 2018		6 episodes	64–72 min	English	
Rapture	Music	March 30, 2018		1 season, 8 episodes	52–63 min	English	
Bobby Kennedy for President	History	April 27, 2018		4 chapters	59–66 min	English	
Evil Genius: The True Story of America's Most Diabolical Bank Heist	True crime	May 11, 2018		4 episodes	46–54 min	English	
Explained	Various	May 23, 2018	October 15, 2021	3 seasons, 44 episodes	14–26 min	English	
November 13: Attack on Paris	True crime	June 1, 2018		3 episodes	47–59 min	French	
Dark Tourist	Travel	July 20, 2018		1 season, 8 episodes	39–42 min	English	
Marching Orders	Subcultures	August 3, 2018		1 season, 12 episodes	9–14 min	English	
72 Dangerous Animals: Asia	Nature	August 10, 2018		12 episodes	44–48 min	English	
Afflicted	Health	August 10, 2018		1 season, 7 episodes	37–46 min	English	
Follow This	Various	August 23, 2018	November 1, 2018	3 parts, 20 episodes	15–20 min	English	
First and Last	True crime	September 7, 2018		1 season, 6 episodes	38–43 min	English	
Boca Juniors Confidential	Sports	September 14, 2018		1 season, 4 episodes	40–44 min	Spanish	
Salt Fat Acid Heat	Travel/Food	October 11, 2018		4 episodes	40–48 min	English	
FightWorld	Travel/Sports	October 12, 2018		1 season, 5 episodes	41–44 min	English	
Terrorism Close Calls	Professions	October 26, 2018		1 season, 10 episodes	47–49 min	English	
Medal of Honor	Biography	November 9, 2018		1 season, 8 episodes	46–61 min	English	
Dogs	Pets	November 16, 2018	July 7, 2021	2 seasons, 10 episodes	44–54 min	English	
Vai Anitta	Music	November 16, 2018		1 season, 6 episodes	25–35 min	Portuguese	
Sunderland 'Til I Die	Sports	December 14, 2018	February 13, 2024	3 seasons, 17 episodes	30–53 min	English	
The Innocent Man	True crime	December 14, 2018		6 episodes	42–52 min	English	
7 Days Out	Professions	December 21, 2018		1 season, 6 episodes	47–48 min	English	
Murder Mountain	True crime	December 28, 2018		6 episodes	43 min	English	
Trigger Warning with Killer Mike	Society	January 18, 2019		1 season, 6 episodes	22–27 min	English	
Conversations with a Killer: The Ted Bundy Tapes	True crime	January 24, 2019		4 episodes	51–74 min	English	
Examination of Conscience	True crime	January 25, 2019		1 season, 3 episodes	51–54 min	Spanish	
Larry Charles' Dangerous World of Comedy	Travel/Professions	February 15, 2019		1 season, 4 episodes	51–66 min	English	
Losers	Sports	March 1, 2019		1 collection, 8 episodes	25–37 min	English	
Cricket Fever: Mumbai Indians	Sports	March 1, 2019		1 season, 8 episodes	33–44 min	English	
The Disappearance of Madeleine McCann	True crime	March 15, 2019		8 episodes	43–65 min	English	
Our Planet	Nature	April 5, 2019	June 14, 2023	2 seasons, 12 episodes	49–54 min	English	
Street Food: Asia	Food/Culinary art	April 26, 2019		9 episodes	30–34 min	English	
1994	True crime	May 17, 2019		5 episodes	44–52 min	Spanish	
Killer Ratings	True crime	May 31, 2019		1 season, 7 episodes	42–58 min	Portuguese	
The Chef Show	Food/Culinary art	June 7, 2019	September 24, 2020	2 seasons, 25 episodes	26–34 min	English	
The Alcàsser Murders	True crime	June 14, 2019		1 season, 5 episodes	53–66 min	Spanish	
Exhibit A	True crime	June 28, 2019		1 season, 4 episodes	29–41 min	English	
The Last Czars	History	July 3, 2019		6 episodes	42–50 min	English	
Taco Chronicles	Food/Culinary art	July 12, 2019	November 23, 2022	3 volumes, 21 episodes	24–33 min	Spanish	
The Family	Politics	August 9, 2019		5 episodes	47–54 min	English	
Happy Jail	Society	August 14, 2019		5 episodes	29–37 min	English	
Diagnosis	Health	August 16, 2019		1 season, 7 episodes	43–49 min	English	
The Mind, Explained	Health	September 12, 2019	November 19, 2021	2 seasons, 10 episodes	19–26 min	English	
Inside Bill's Brain: Decoding Bill Gates	Biography	September 20, 2019		3 episodes	51–56 min	English	
Living Undocumented	Society	October 2, 2019		1 season, 6 episodes	38–46 min	English	
Unnatural Selection	Health	October 18, 2019		4 episodes	62–70 min	English	
Breakfast, Lunch & Dinner	Travel/Food	October 23, 2019		1 season, 4 episodes	43–44 min	English	
The Devil Next Door	True crime	November 4, 2019		5 episodes	43–52 min	English	
Maradona in Mexico	Sports	November 13, 2019		7 episodes	26–39 min	Spanish	
Who Killed Little Gregory?	True crime	November 20, 2019		5 episodes	53–69 min	French	
Narcoworld: Dope Stories	Drugs	November 22, 2019		1 season, 4 episodes	39–48 min	English	
Broken	Professions	November 27, 2019		1 season, 4 episodes	58–61 min	English	
The Movies That Made Us	Film industry	November 29, 2019	October 12, 2021	3 seasons, 16 episodes	43–54 min	English	
The Confession Killer	True crime	December 6, 2019		5 episodes	45–50 min	English	
Don't F**k with Cats: Hunting an Internet Killer	True crime	December 18, 2019		3 episodes	57–66 min	English	
Kevin Hart: Don't F**k This Up	Biography	December 27, 2019		1 season, 6 episodes	25–36 min	English	
Arashi's Diary -Voyage-	Music	December 31, 2019	February 28, 2021	24 episodes	18–46 min	Japanese	
Sex, Explained	Sex	January 2, 2020		6 episodes	17–26 min	English	
Cheer	Sports	January 8, 2020	January 12, 2022	2 seasons, 15 episodes	40–66 min	English	
Killer Inside: The Mind of Aaron Hernandez	True crime	January 15, 2020		3 episodes	66–67 min	English	
Pandemic: How to Prevent an Outbreak	Health	January 22, 2020		6 episodes	41–53 min	English	
Rise of Empires: Ottoman	History	January 24, 2020	December 29, 2022	2 seasons, 12 episodes	40–50 min	English	
Night on Earth	Nature	January 29, 2020		6 episodes	41–53 min	English	
The Pharmacist	True crime	February 5, 2020		4 episodes	48–61 min	English	
Babies	Human development	February 21, 2020	June 19, 2020	2 parts, 12 episodes	46–54 min	English	
The Trials of Gabriel Fernandez	True crime	February 26, 2020		6 episodes	47–63 min	English	
Tiger King: Murder, Mayhem and Madness	True crime	March 20, 2020	November 17, 2021	2 seasons, 13 episodes	40–48 min	English	
How to Fix a Drug Scandal	True crime	April 1, 2020		4 episodes	47–59 min	English	
The Innocence Files	True crime	April 15, 2020		9 episodes	51–85 min	English	
Absurd Planet	Nature	April 22, 2020		1 season, 12 episodes	19–20 min	English	
Coronavirus, Explained	Health	April 26, 2020		3 episodes	20–26 min	English	
Trial by Media	True crime	May 11, 2020		1 season, 6 episodes	57–64 min	English	
History 101	History	May 22, 2020	August 25, 2022	2 seasons, 20 episodes	20–24 min	English	
Jeffrey Epstein: Filthy Rich	True crime	May 27, 2020		4 episodes	55–57 min	English	
Lenox Hill	Health	June 10, 2020		1 season, 9 episodes	31–53 min	English	
Home Game	Sports	June 26, 2020		1 season, 8 episodes	22–36 min	English	
Down to Earth with Zac Efron	Travel	July 10, 2020	November 11, 2022	2 seasons, 16 episodes	33–46 min	English	
The Business of Drugs	Drugs	July 14, 2020		6 episodes	38–46 min	English	
Street Food: Latin America	Food/Culinary art	July 21, 2020		6 episodes	29–34 min	English	
Fear City: New York vs the Mafia	History	July 22, 2020		3 episodes	44–62 min	English	
Connected	Society	August 2, 2020		1 season, 6 episodes	39–49 min	English	
Immigration Nation	Society	August 3, 2020		6 episodes	60–64 min	English	
Mystery Lab	Various	August 4, 2020		1 season, 8 episodes	24–28 min	Portuguese	
World's Most Wanted	True crime	August 5, 2020		1 season, 5 episodes	45–48 min	French	
Tiny Creatures	Nature	August 7, 2020		1 season, 8 episodes	24–25 min	English	
High Score	Video game industry	August 19, 2020		6 episodes	37–47 min	English	
Chef's Table: BBQ	Food/Culinary art	September 2, 2020		4 episodes	42–47 min	English	
La Línea: Shadow of Narco	Drugs	September 9, 2020		4 episodes	29–37 min	Spanish	
Challenger: The Final Flight	History	September 16, 2020		4 episodes	41–52 min	English	
The Playbook	Sports/Biography	September 22, 2020		1 season, 5 episodes	31–35 min	English	
A Perfect Crime	True crime	September 25, 2020		4 episodes	38–46 min	German	
Whose Vote Counts, Explained	Politics	September 28, 2020		3 episodes	24–25 min	English	
Song Exploder	Music	October 2, 2020	December 15, 2020	2 volumes, 8 episodes	22–27 min	English	
Bad Boy Billionaires: India	True crime	October 5, 2020		3 episodes	52–64 min	English	
Deaf U	Society	October 9, 2020		1 season, 8 episodes	16–21 min	English	
Move	Subcultures	October 23, 2020		1 season, 5 episodes	47–59 min	French	
Carmel: Who Killed Maria Marta?	True crime	November 5, 2020		4 episodes	55–60 min	Spanish	
Trial 4	True crime	November 11, 2020		8 episodes	52–60 min	English	
Voices of Fire	Music	November 20, 2020		1 season, 6 episodes	31–42 min	English	
Alien Worlds	Speculative	December 2, 2020		1 season, 4 episodes	41–47 min	English	
Room 2806: The Accusation	True crime	December 7, 2020		4 episodes	44–63 min	French	
The Surgeon's Cut	Health	December 9, 2020		1 season, 4 episodes	51–58 min	English	
Anitta: Made in Honório	Music	December 16, 2020		1 season, 6 episodes	26–35 min	Portuguese	
Break It All: The History of Rock in Latin America	Music	December 16, 2020		6 episodes	45–55 min	English	
The Ripper	True crime	December 16, 2020		4 episodes	47–51 min	English	
SanPa: Sins of the Savior	Biography	December 30, 2020		5 episodes	55–64 min	Italian	

=== Reality ===
Title	Genre	Premiere	Finale	Seasons	Runtime	Language	Notes
White Rabbit Project	Reality	December 9, 2016		1 season, 10 episodes	45–48 min	English	
Chasing Cameron	Docu-reality	December 27, 2016		1 season, 10 episodes	26–33 min	English	
Ultimate Beastmaster	Reality competition	February 24, 2017	August 31, 2018	3 seasons, 29 episodes	41–84 min	English	
Coach Snoop	Sports docu-reality	February 2, 2018		1 season, 8 episodes	28–30 min	English	
Queer Eye	Makeover reality	February 7, 2018	January 21, 2026	10 seasons, 80 episodes	43–68 min	English	
Nailed It!	Baking competition	March 9, 2018	October 5, 2022	7 seasons, 43 episodes	12–35 min	English	
Fastest Car	Docu-reality	April 6, 2018	September 20, 2019	2 seasons, 15 episodes	41–52 min	English	
Cooking on High	Cooking competition	June 22, 2018		1 season, 12 episodes	13–15 min	English	
Sugar Rush	Baking competition	July 13, 2018	July 31, 2020	3 seasons, 20 episodes	47–55 min	English	
Amazing Interiors	Reality	July 20, 2018		1 season, 12 episodes	21–28 min	English	
Magic for Humans	Reality	August 17, 2018	May 15, 2020	3 seasons, 19 episodes	20–25 min	English	
Stay Here	Reality	August 17, 2018		1 season, 8 episodes	31–33 min	English	
Car Masters: Rust to Riches	Reality	September 14, 2018	October 23, 2024	6 seasons, 48 episodes	31–43 min	English	
Battlefish	Reality	September 21, 2018		1 season, 8 episodes	38–46 min	English	
Made in Mexico	Docu-soap	September 28, 2018		1 season, 8 episodes	45–54 min	Spanish	
Dancing Queen	Reality	October 5, 2018		1 season, 8 episodes	38–46 min	English	
Haunted	Reality	October 19, 2018	May 14, 2021	3 seasons, 18 episodes	20–34 min	English	
Westside	Reality	November 9, 2018		1 season, 8 episodes	46–58 min	English	
The Final Table	Cooking competition	November 20, 2018		1 season, 10 episodes	48–60 min	English	
Death by Magic	Reality	November 30, 2018		1 season, 8 episodes	31–39 min	English	
Tidying Up with Marie Kondo	Reality	January 1, 2019		1 season, 8 episodes	35–47 min	English	
Nailed It! Mexico	Baking competition	February 8, 2019	January 5, 2021	3 seasons, 18 episodes	32–34 min	Spanish	
Dating Around	Dating show	February 14, 2019	June 12, 2020	2 seasons, 12 episodes	24–30 min	English	
You vs. Wild	Interactive survival	April 10, 2019		1 season, 8 episodes	14–26 min	English	
Flinch	Reality competition	May 3, 2019		1 season, 10 episodes	20–25 min	English	
Jailbirds	Docu-reality	May 10, 2019		1 season, 10 episodes	37–47 min	English	
Awake: The Million Dollar Game	Reality game show	June 14, 2019		1 season, 8 episodes	35–41 min	English	
Extreme Engagement	Docu-reality	July 12, 2019		1 season, 8 episodes	32–40 min	English	
Basketball or Nothing	Docu-reality	August 2, 2019		1 season, 6 episodes	31–37 min	English	
Hyperdrive	Reality competition	August 21, 2019		1 season, 10 episodes	43–61 min	English	
Styling Hollywood	Docu-reality	August 30, 2019		1 season, 8 episodes	33–40 min	English	
Rhythm + Flow	Rap music competition	October 9, 2019	December 4, 2024	2 seasons, 20 episodes	38–69 min	English	
Nailed It! France	Baking competition	October 25, 2019		1 season, 6 episodes	34 min	French	
Nailed It! Spain	Baking competition	October 25, 2019		1 season, 6 episodes	31–34 min	Spanish	
Prank Encounters	Prank show	October 25, 2019	April 1, 2021	2 seasons, 15 episodes	19–27 min	English	
I'm with the Band: Nasty Cherry	Music docu-reality	November 15, 2019		1 season, 6 episodes	25–41 min	English	
No Time for Shame	Docu-reality	November 19, 2019		1 season, 6 episodes	38–47 min	Spanish	
Singapore Social	Docu-soap	November 22, 2019		1 season, 8 episodes	35–44 min	English	
The Circle	Reality competition	January 1, 2020	October 2, 2024	7 seasons, 90 episodes	41–63 min	English	
Until Dawn	Paranormal activity/Docu-comedy	January 10, 2020		1 season, 10 episodes	17–25 min	French	
Nailed It! Germany	Baking competition	January 17, 2020		1 season, 6 episodes	34–37 min	German	
The Goop Lab with Gwyneth Paltrow	Docu-reality	January 24, 2020		1 season, 6 episodes	30–37 min	English	
Next in Fashion	Fashion competition	January 29, 2020	March 3, 2023	2 seasons, 20 episodes	42–58 min	English	
What the Love! with Karan Johar	Dating show	January 30, 2020		1 season, 7 episodes	45–50 min	English	
The Circle Brazil	Reality competition	March 11, 2020		1 season, 12 episodes	39–61 min	Portuguese	
100 Humans	Reality	March 13, 2020		1 season, 8 episodes	32–41 min	English	
The Circle France	Reality competition	April 9, 2020		1 season, 12 episodes	37–51 min	French	
Too Hot to Handle	Dating show	April 17, 2020	August 2, 2024	6 seasons, 59 episodes	32–60 min	English	
Cooked with Cannabis	Cooking competition	April 20, 2020		1 season, 6 episodes	32–37 min	English	
The Big Flower Fight	Reality competition	May 18, 2020		1 season, 8 episodes	33–42 min	English	
Floor Is Lava	Reality game show	June 19, 2020	September 30, 2022	3 seasons, 20 episodes	25–37 min	English	
Twogether	Travel docu-reality	June 26, 2020		1 season, 8 episodes	55–83 min	Korean	
Say I Do	Reality	July 1, 2020		1 season, 8 episodes	52–57 min	English	
Southern Survival	Reality	July 3, 2020		1 season, 8 episodes	25–32 min	English	
Dating Around: Brazil	Dating show	July 10, 2020		1 season, 6 episodes	26–27 min	Portuguese	
Skin Decision: Before and After	Reality	July 15, 2020		1 season, 8 episodes	32–44 min	English	
Indian Matchmaking	Reality	July 16, 2020	April 21, 2023	3 seasons, 24 episodes	24–42 min	English	
Sing On! Spain	Music competition	July 24, 2020		1 season, 8 episodes	37–42 min	Spanish	
Sing On! Germany	Music competition	August 7, 2020		1 season, 7 episodes	35–40 min	German	
(Un)well	Docu-reality	August 12, 2020		1 season, 6 episodes	48–57 min	English	
DeMarcus Family Rules	Docu-soap	August 19, 2020		1 season, 6 episodes	25–31 min	English	
Million Dollar Beach House	Reality	August 26, 2020		1 season, 6 episodes	23–30 min	English	
Get Organized with The Home Edit	Reality	September 9, 2020	April 1, 2022	2 seasons, 16 episodes	40–47 min	English	
Sing On!	Music competition	September 16, 2020		1 season, 8 episodes	34–37 min	English	
Barbecue Showdown	Cooking competition	September 18, 2020	July 4, 2024	3 seasons, 24 episodes	38–48 min	English	
Dream Home Makeover	Reality	October 16, 2020	December 9, 2022	4 seasons, 24 episodes	22–33 min	English	
Country Ever After	Music docu-reality	November 6, 2020		1 season, 12 episodes	22–26 min	English	
A Queen Is Born	Reality	November 11, 2020		1 season, 6 episodes	42–44 min	Portuguese	
We Are the Champions	Docu-reality	November 17, 2020		1 season, 6 episodes	29–35 min	English	
Holiday Home Makeover with Mr. Christmas	Reality	November 18, 2020		1 season, 4 episodes	35–40 min	English	
Fabulous Lives of Bollywood Wives	Docu-soap	November 27, 2020	October 18, 2024	3 seasons, 24 episodes	30–50 min	English	
Best Leftovers Ever!	Cooking competition	December 30, 2020		1 season, 8 episodes	34–35 min	English	

=== Variety ===
Title	Genre	Premiere	Finale	Seasons	Runtime	Language	Notes
Chelsea	Late-night	May 11, 2016	December 15, 2017	2 seasons, 120 episodes	27–64 min	English	(Note: The episode list of these shows has been changed since the original release.)
Bill Nye Saves the World	Science education	April 21, 2017	May 11, 2018	3 seasons, 25 episodes	26–41 min	English	
The Joel McHale Show with Joel McHale	Comedy	February 18, 2018	July 15, 2018	1 season, 19 episodes	22–28 min	English	
A Little Help with Carol Burnett	Talk show	May 4, 2018		1 season, 12 episodes	21–29 min	English	
Busted!	Variety show	May 4, 2018	January 22, 2021	3 seasons, 28 episodes	63–98 min	Korean	
The Break with Michelle Wolf	Late-night	May 27, 2018	July 29, 2018	1 season, 10 episodes	23–30 min	English	
Norm Macdonald Has a Show	Talk show	September 14, 2018		1 season, 10 episodes	26–35 min	English	
The Curious Creations of Christine McConnell	Cooking show	October 12, 2018		1 season, 6 episodes	24–29 min	English	
Patriot Act with Hasan Minhaj	Talk show	October 28, 2018	June 28, 2020	6 volumes, 40 episodes	22–30 min	English	
The Fix	Panel show	December 14, 2018		1 season, 10 episodes	23–31 min	English	
J-Style Trip	Variety show	March 21, 2020	June 13, 2020	1 season, 13 episodes	56–88 min	Mandarin	
Frank Elstner: Just One Last Question	Talk show	June 12, 2020		1 season, 5 episodes	37–48 min	German	
The Cabin with Bert Kreischer	Variety docu-comedy	October 13, 2020		1 season, 5 episodes	22–27 min	English	

== Continuations ==
Title	Genre	Previous network(s)	Premiere	Finale	Seasons	Runtime	Language	Notes
Lovesick (seasons 2–3)	Comedy	Channel 4	November 17, 2016	January 1, 2018	2 seasons, 16 episodes	25–28 min	English	
The Staircase (episodes 11–13)	Docuseries	Canal+	June 8, 2018		3 episodes	46–53 min	English	
Paquita Salas (seasons 2–3)	Mockumentary	Flooxer	June 29, 2018	June 28, 2019	2 seasons, 11 episodes	23–38 min	Spanish	
Comedians in Cars Getting Coffee (seasons 10–11)	Comedy talk show	Crackle	July 6, 2018	July 19, 2019	2 seasons, 24 episodes	12–41 min	English	
Inside the World's Toughest Prisons (seasons 2–7)	Docuseries	Channel 5	July 6, 2018	September 15, 2023	6 seasons, 23 episodes	43–54 min	English	
MeatEater (seasons 7–10)	Docuseries	Sportsman Channel	October 2, 2018	February 2, 2022	4 seasons, 44 episodes	22–32 min	English	
Little Things (seasons 2–4)	Romantic comedy	Dice Media	October 5, 2018	October 15, 2021	3 seasons, 24 episodes	19–38 min	Hindi	
Hip-Hop Evolution (seasons 2–4)	Docuseries	HBO Canada	October 19, 2018	January 17, 2020	3 seasons, 12 episodes	36–52 min	English	
The Last Kingdom (seasons 3–5)	Historical drama	BBC Two	November 19, 2018	March 9, 2022	3 seasons, 30 episodes	50–59 min	English	
Travelers (season 3)	Science fiction	Showcase	December 14, 2018		1 season, 10 episodes	44–50 min	English	
Slasher (season 3)	Horror	Chiller; Super Channel	May 23, 2019		1 season, 8 episodes	45–48 min	English	
Designated Survivor (season 3)	Political thriller	ABC	June 7, 2019		1 season, 10 episodes	47–53 min	English	
Money Heist (parts 3–5)	Heist crime drama	Antena 3	July 19, 2019	December 3, 2021	3 parts, 26 episodes	41–76 min	Spanish	
QB1: Beyond the Lights (season 3)	Docuseries	go90	August 16, 2019		1 season, 10 episodes	28–41 min	English	
Top Boy (series 3–5)	Crime drama	Channel 4	September 13, 2019	September 7, 2023	3 seasons, 24 episodes	41–66 min	English	
You (seasons 2–5)	Psychological thriller	Lifetime	December 26, 2019	April 24, 2025	4 seasons, 40 episodes	41–58 min	English	
Unsolved Mysteries (seasons 15–17)	Docuseries	NBC (seasons 1–9); CBS (seasons 10–11); Lifetime (seasons 12–13); Spike (season 14)	July 1, 2020	October 2, 2024	5 volumes, 30 episodes	36–54 min	English	

== Specials ==
=== One-time ===
Title	Genre	Premiere	Runtime	Language	Notes
Puss in Book: Trapped in an Epic Tale	Animation/interactive fiction	June 20, 2017	23 min	English	
Buddy Thunderstruck: The Maybe Pile	Animation/interactive fiction	July 14, 2017	13 min	English	
DreamWorks Home: For the Holidays	Animation	December 1, 2017	45 min	English	
A StoryBots Christmas	Animation	December 1, 2017	25 min	English	
Stretch Armstrong: The Breakout	Animation/interactive fiction	March 13, 2018	45 min	English	
Super Monsters Save Halloween	Animation	October 5, 2018	23 min	English	
Club de Cuervos Presents: I, Potro	Mockumentary	October 19, 2018	50 min	Spanish	
Free Rein: The Twelve Neighs of Christmas	Teen drama	December 7, 2018	57 min	English	
Super Monsters and the Wish Star	Animation	December 7, 2018	27 min	English	
Prince of Peoria: A Christmas Moose Miracle	Sitcom	December 17, 2018	29 min	English	
Aggretsuko: We Wish You a Metal Christmas	Anime	December 20, 2018	22 min	Japanese	
Black Mirror: Bandersnatch	Science fiction/drama/interactive	December 28, 2018	1 h 30 min	English	
Free Rein: Valentine's Day	Teen drama	February 1, 2019	50 min	English	
True: Happy Hearts Day	Animation	February 1, 2019	23 min	English	
Super Monsters Furever Friends	Animation	April 16, 2019	58 min	English	
Malibu Rescue	Comedy	May 13, 2019	1 h 9 min	English	
Oprah Winfrey Presents When They See Us Now	Interview	June 12, 2019	1 h 1 min	English	
Our Planet - Behind the Scenes	Documentary	August 4, 2019	1 h 3 min	English	
The Crystal Calls – Making The Dark Crystal: Age of Resistance	Documentary	August 31, 2019	1 h 22 min	English	
Super Monsters Back to School	Animation	August 16, 2019	23 min	English	
True: Tricky Treat Day	Animation	September 20, 2019	23 min	English	
Super Monsters: Vida's First Halloween	Animation	October 4, 2019	24 min	English	
The Spooky Tale of Captain Underpants Hack-a-Ween	Animation	October 8, 2019	46 min	English	
My Next Guest with David Letterman and Shah Rukh Khan	Talk show	October 25, 2019	1 h 1 min	English	
The House of Flowers Presents: The Funeral	Comedy	November 1, 2019	35 min	Spanish	
True: Grabbleapple Harvest	Animation	November 1, 2019	23 min	English	
GO! The Unforgettable Party	Spanish language musical	November 15, 2019	1 h	Spanish	
Super Monsters Save Christmas	Animation	November 26, 2019	24 min	English	
True: Winter Wishes	Animation	November 26, 2019	45 min	English	
Spirit Riding Free: The Spirit of Christmas	Animation	December 6, 2019	45 min	English	
A Family Reunion Christmas	Sitcom	December 9, 2019	29 min	English	
Jack Whitehall: Christmas with My Father	Variety show	December 12, 2019	1 h 4 min	English	
Night on Earth: Shot in the Dark	Documentary	January 30, 2020	59 min	English	
Captain Underpants: Epic Choice-o-Rama	Animation/interactive fiction	February 11, 2020	37 min	English	
Carmen Sandiego: To Steal or Not to Steal	Animation/interactive fiction	March 10, 2020	31 min	English	
Making Unorthodox	Making-of	March 26, 2020	21 min	English	
Dragons: Rescue Riders: Hunt for the Golden Dragon	Animation	March 27, 2020	46 min	English	
True: Wuzzle Wegg Day	Animation	March 27, 2020	23 min	English	
Money Heist: The Phenomenon	Documentary	April 3, 2020	57 min	Spanish	
Go! Go! Cory Carson: The Chrissy	Animation	May 1, 2020	42 min	English	
Unbreakable Kimmy Schmidt: Kimmy vs. the Reverend	Comedy/Interactive fiction	May 12, 2020	1 h 20 min	English	
True: Rainbow Rescue	Animation	June 2, 2020	23 min	English	
The Larva Island Movie	Animation	July 23, 2020	1 h 31 min	English	
Dragons: Rescue Riders: Secrets of the Songwing	Animation	July 24, 2020	46 min	English	
Sugar High	Baking competition	July 31, 2020	44 min	English	
Super Monsters: The New Class	Animation	August 1, 2020	24 min	English	
A Go! Go! Cory Carson Summer Camp	Animation	August 4, 2020	20 min	English	
Malibu Rescue: The Next Wave	Comedy	August 4, 2020	1 h 10 min	English	
The Magic School Bus Rides Again: Kids in Space	Animation	August 7, 2020	45 min	English	
Making The Witcher	Making-of	August 26, 2020	32 min	English	
True: Friendship Day	Animation	September 1, 2020	23 min	English	
The Boss Baby: Get That Baby!	Animation/interactive fiction	September 1, 2020	24 min	English	
A Go! Go! Cory Carson Halloween	Animation	October 2, 2020	21 min	English	
StarBeam: Halloween Hero	Animation	October 6, 2020	33 min	English	
Super Monsters: Dia de los Monsters	Animation	October 9, 2020	25 min	English	
The Magic School Bus Rides Again: The Frizz Connection	Animation	October 20, 2020	46 min	English	
Dragons: Rescue Riders: Huttsgalor Holiday	Animation	November 24, 2020	46 min	English	
A Go! Go! Cory Carson Christmas	Animation	November 27, 2020	21 min	English	
Chico Bon Bon and the Very Berry Holiday	Animation	December 3, 2020	25 min	English	
Captain Underpants: Mega Blissmas	Animation	December 4, 2020	46 min	English	
Mighty Express: A Mighty Christmas	Animation	December 5, 2020	25 min	English	
Spirit Riding Free: Ride Along Adventure	Animation/interactive fiction	December 8, 2020	22 min	English	
Super Monsters: Santa's Super Monster Helpers	Animation	December 8, 2020	24 min	English	
A Trash Truck Christmas	Animation	December 11, 2020	28 min	English	
The Netflix Afterparty: The Best Shows of the Worst Year	Aftershow	December 13, 2020	59 min	English	
An Unremarkable Christmas	Spanish language comedy	December 17, 2020	1 h 22 min	Spanish	
The Magic School Bus Rides Again: In the Zone	Animation	December 26, 2020	46 min	English	

=== Episodic ===
Title	Genre	Premiere	Finale	Seasons	Runtime	Language	Notes
13 Reasons Why: Beyond the Reasons	Aftershow/Interview	March 31, 2017	August 23, 2019	3 seasons, 3 episodes	17–67 min	English	
Beyond Stranger Things	Aftershow	October 27, 2017		1 season, 7 episodes	15–25 min	English	
Dance & Sing with True	Animation	May 18, 2018		1 collection, 11 episodes	2 min	English	
Super Monsters Monster Party	Animation	September 14, 2018		1 collection, 4 episodes	2 min	English	
Nailed It! Holiday	Reality competition	December 7, 2018	November 22, 2019	2 seasons, 13 episodes	32–35 min	English	
Super Monsters Monster Pets	Animation	June 7, 2019		1 season, 5 episodes	9–12 min	English	
True Tunes	Animation	July 12, 2019		1 collection, 8 episodes	3 min	English	
Mighty Little Bheem: Diwali	Animation	October 18, 2019		1 collection, 3 episodes	6–7 min	No dialogue	
Queer Eye: We're in Japan!	Reality television	November 1, 2019		1 season, 4 episodes	49–51 min	English	
Sugar Rush Christmas	Baking competition	November 29, 2019	November 27, 2020	2 seasons, 12 episodes	48–52 min	English	
Mighty Little Bheem: Festival of Colors	Animation	March 5, 2020		1 collection, 3 episodes	6–7 min	No dialogue	
True: Terrific Tales	Animation	May 12, 2020		1 season, 8 episodes	7–8 min	English	
Word Party Songs	Animation	August 7, 2020		1 season, 8 episodes	3 min	English	
Game On: A Comedy Crossover Event	Comedy	August 10, 2020		1 season, 4 episodes	26–30 min	English	
The Witcher: A Look Inside the Episodes	Making-of	September 2, 2020		8 episodes	5–7 min	English	
Rhyme Time Town Singalongs	Animation	December 22, 2020		1 season, 10 episodes	12 min	English	

== Regional original programming ==
These shows are originals, because Netflix commissioned or acquired them and had their premier on the service, but they are not available worldwide.

=== Drama ===
Title	Genre	Premiere	Finale	Seasons	Runtime	Netflix exclusive region	Notes
Shadow	Thriller	March 8, 2019		1 season, 8 episodes	40–49 min	Selected territories	

=== Animation ===
==== Kids & Family ====
Title	Premiere	Finale	Seasons	Runtime	Language	Netflix exclusive region	Notes
Voltron: Legendary Defender	June 10, 2016	December 14, 2018	8 seasons, 78 episodes	23–68 min	English	Selected territories	
Justin Time GO!	June 24, 2016		1 season, 13 episodes	22 min	English	Selected territories	
Home: Adventures with Tip & Oh	July 29, 2016	July 20, 2018	4 seasons, 52 episodes	22–24 min	English	Selected territories	
World of Winx	November 4, 2016	June 16, 2017	2 seasons, 26 episodes	24 min	English	Selected territories	
VeggieTales in the City	February 24, 2017	September 15, 2017	2 seasons, 26 episodes	23 min	English	Selected territories	
All Hail King Julien: Exiled	May 12, 2017		1 season, 13 episodes	23 min	English	Selected territories	
Spirit Riding Free	May 5, 2017	April 5, 2019	8 seasons, 52 episodes	23 min	English	Selected territories	
Dinotrux Supercharged	November 10, 2017	August 3, 2018	3 seasons, 26 episodes	24 min	English	Selected territories	
Trolls: The Beat Goes On!	January 19, 2018	November 22, 2019	8 seasons, 52 episodes	24–25 min	English	Selected territories	

=== Non-English language scripted ===
Title	Genre	Premiere	Finale	Seasons	Runtime	Language	Netflix exclusive region	Notes
Estocolmo	Crime drama	November 11, 2016		1 season, 13 episodes	37–49 min	Spanish	Selected territories	
Wild District	Crime drama	October 19, 2018	November 8, 2019	2 seasons, 20 episodes	40–50 min	Spanish	Selected territories	
Go! Live Your Way	Musical	February 22, 2019	November 15, 2019	2 seasons, 30 episodes	36–44 min	Spanish	Selected territories	

=== Unscripted ===
==== Docuseries ====
Title	Subject	Premiere	Finale	Seasons	Runtime	Language	Netflix exclusive region	Notes
Inside the Real Narcos	Drugs	December 14, 2018		1 season, 3 episodes	45–46 min	English	Selected territories	

==== Reality ====
Title	Genre	Premiere	Finale	Seasons	Runtime	Language	Netflix exclusive region	Notes
Exatlon	Reality competition	July 3, 2020		1 season, 15 episodes	45–53 min	Turkish	Turkey	

=== Co-productions ===
These shows may not be available worldwide due to the distributing deal with the co-production partner networks.

Title	Genre	Partner/Country	Premiere	Finale	Seasons	Runtime	Language	Netflix exclusive region	Notes
Good Morning Call	Slice of life/Romantic comedy	Fuji Television/Japan	May 13, 2016	September 22, 2017	2 seasons, 27 episodes	43–49 min	Japanese	All other markets	
The Last Kingdom (season 2)	Historical fiction	BBC Two/United Kingdom	July 6, 2016		1 season, 8 episodes	58–59 min	English	Selected territories	(Note: These shows were initially co-productions, but then they were picked up solely by Netflix as Netflix Originals.)
Terrace House: Aloha State	Reality television	Fuji Television/Japan	November 1, 2016	August 29, 2017	4 parts, 36 episodes	30–47 min	Japanese	All other markets	
Dirk Gently's Holistic Detective Agency	Comic science fiction	BBC America/United States	December 11, 2016	December 16, 2017	2 seasons, 18 episodes	41–53 min	English	All other markets	
Crazyhead	Comedy horror	E4/United Kingdom	December 16, 2016		1 season, 6 episodes	42–45 min	English	All other markets except Ireland	
Travelers (seasons 1–2)	Science fiction	Showcase/Canada	December 23, 2016	December 26, 2017	2 seasons, 24 episodes	44–50 min	English	All other markets	
Frontier	Historical drama	Discovery/Canada	January 20, 2017	November 23, 2018	3 seasons, 18 episodes	43–52 min	English	All other markets	
Anne with an E	Historical drama	CBC/Canada	May 12, 2017	January 3, 2020	3 seasons, 27 episodes	44–88 min	English	All other markets	
El Chapo	Crime drama	Univision/United States	June 16, 2017	July 27, 2018	3 seasons, 34 episodes	39–55 min	Spanish	All other markets	
Kantaro: The Sweet Tooth Salaryman	Comedy drama	TV Tokyo/Japan	July 7, 2017		1 season, 12 episodes	24 min	Japanese	All other markets	
The Worst Witch	Children's fantasy	CBBC/United Kingdom; ZDF/Germany	July 21, 2017	October 1, 2020	4 seasons, 51 episodes	28–59 min	English	Selected territories	
Million Yen Women	Romantic dark comedy	TV Tokyo/Japan	August 15, 2017		1 season, 12 episodes	24 min	Japanese	All other markets	
Re:Mind	Psychological thriller	TV Tokyo/Japan	October 13, 2017		1 season, 13 episodes	23–26 min	Japanese	Selected territories	
Ainori Love Wagon: Asian Journey	Reality television	Fuji Television/Japan	October 26, 2017	March 28, 2019	2 seasons, 44 episodes	27–37 min	Japanese	All other markets	
Alias Grace	Historical drama	CBC/Canada	November 3, 2017		6 episodes	43–46 min	English	All other markets	
Glitch (seasons 2–3)	Paranormal-drama	ABC/Australia	November 28, 2017	September 25, 2019	2 seasons, 12 episodes	51–57 min	English	Selected territories	
Terrace House: Opening New Doors	Reality television	Fuji Television/Japan	December 19, 2017	February 12, 2019	6 parts, 49 episodes	32–44 min	Japanese	All other markets	
The End of the F***ing World	Dark comedy	Channel 4/United Kingdom	January 5, 2018	November 4, 2019	2 seasons, 16 episodes	18–25 min	English	All other markets	
Mob Psycho 100	Supernatural/Action comedy	TV Tokyo/Japan	January 12, 2018		1 season, 12 episodes	24 min	Japanese	All other markets	
Collateral	Thriller	BBC Two/United Kingdom	March 9, 2018		4 episodes	56–59 min	English	All other markets except Ireland	
Requiem	Supernatural thriller	BBC One/United Kingdom	March 23, 2018		1 season, 6 episodes	57–58 min	English	All other markets except Ireland	
Troy: Fall of a City	Historical drama	BBC One/United Kingdom	April 6, 2018		1 season, 8 episodes	57–58 min	English	All other markets except Ireland	
The Letdown	Comedy	ABC/Australia	April 21, 2018	May 29, 2019	2 seasons, 13 episodes	27–32 min	English	All other markets	
The New Legends of Monkey	Fantasy adventure	ABC/Australia; TVNZ/New Zealand	April 27, 2018	August 7, 2020	2 seasons, 20 episodes	23–35 min	English	All other markets	
Safe	Thriller	C8/France	May 10, 2018		1 season, 8 episodes	41–48 min	English	All other markets	
Kiss Me First	Thriller	Channel 4/United Kingdom	June 29, 2018		1 season, 6 episodes	46–48 min	English	All other markets	
Wanderlust	Drama	BBC One/United Kingdom	October 19, 2018		1 season, 6 episodes	56–59 min	English	All other markets except Ireland	
I Am a Killer	True crime docuseries	Crime + Investigation/United Kingdom	August 3, 2018	January 8, 2025	6 seasons, 44 episodes	39–53 min	English	All other markets	
Pine Gap	Political thriller	ABC/Australia	December 7, 2018		1 season, 6 episodes	54–59 min	English	All other markets	
Perfume	Thriller	ZDFneo/Germany	December 21, 2018		1 season, 6 episodes	53–67 min	German	All other markets	
Watership Down	Animation/fantasy	BBC One/United Kingdom	December 23, 2018		4 episodes	50–51 min	English	All other markets	
Black Earth Rising	Thriller	BBC Two/United Kingdom	January 25, 2019		8 episodes	60 min	English	All other markets	
Nightflyers	Science fiction	Syfy/United States	February 1, 2019		1 season, 10 episodes	40–59 min	English	All other markets	
Northern Rescue	Drama	CBC/Canada	March 1, 2019		1 season, 10 episodes	44–45 min	English	All other markets	
Traitors	Period drama	Channel 4/United Kingdom	March 29, 2019		1 season, 6 episodes	46–47 min	English	All other markets except Ireland	
Tijuana	Crime drama	Univision/United States	April 5, 2019		1 season, 11 episodes	35–45 min	Spanish	All other markets	
Undercover	Crime drama	Eén/Belgium	May 3, 2019	January 10, 2022	3 seasons, 28 episodes	45–54 min	Dutch	Selected territories	
Terrace House: Tokyo 2019–2020	Reality television	Fuji Television/Japan	May 14, 2019	May 19, 2020	4 parts, 42 episodes	35–57 min	Japanese	All other markets	
Ainori Love Wagon: African Journey	Reality television	Fuji Television/Japan	September 5, 2019		1 season, 22 episodes	25–40 min	Japanese	All other markets	
The Spy	Espionage thriller	Canal+/France	September 6, 2019		6 episodes	47–62 min	English	All other markets	
Drug Squad: Costa del Sol	Police procedural	Telecinco/Spain	October 25, 2019		1 season, 13 episodes	60–69 min	Spanish	Selected territories	
Zumbo's Just Desserts (season 2)	Baking reality competition	Seven Network/Australia	November 17, 2019		1 season, 10 episodes	60–75 min	English	Selected territories	
The Bonfire of Destiny	Historical drama	TF1/France	December 26, 2019		1 season, 8 episodes	47–55 min	French	All other markets	
Dracula	Horror	BBC One/United Kingdom	January 4, 2020		1 season, 3 episodes	88–91 min	English	All other markets	
Giri/Haji	Crime thriller	BBC Two/United Kingdom	January 10, 2020		1 season, 8 episodes	57–61 min	English	All other markets	
The Valhalla Murders	Crime drama	RÚV/Iceland	March 13, 2020		1 season, 8 episodes	45–48 min	Icelandic	All other markets	
Feel Good	Comedy	Channel 4/United Kingdom	March 19, 2020	June 4, 2021	2 seasons, 12 episodes	24–30 min	English	All other markets	
Freud	Period thriller	ORF/Austria	March 23, 2020		1 season, 8 episodes	45–55 min	German	All other markets except Belgium, Finland and Hungary	
The Last Dance	Docuseries	ESPN/United States	April 20, 2020	May 18, 2020	10 episodes	49–51 min	English	All other markets	
Crazy Delicious	Cooking competition	Channel 4/United Kingdom	June 24, 2020		1 season, 6 episodes	46 min	English	All other markets	
Alien TV	Hybrid animation	Nine Network/Australia	August 21, 2020	March 19, 2021	2 seasons, 26 episodes	24 min	English	All other markets	
I Am a Killer: Released	Docuseries	Sky Crime/United Kingdom	August 28, 2020		1 season, 3 episodes	30–38 min	English	All other markets	
Detention	Horror	PTS/Taiwan	December 5, 2020	December 26, 2020	1 season, 8 episodes	46–55 min	Mandarin	All other markets	

=== Continuations ===
Title	Genre	Previous network(s)	Premiere	Finale	Seasons	Runtime	Language	Netflix exclusive region	Notes
Mystery Science Theater 3000 (seasons 11–12)	Comic science fiction	KTMA-TV (season 0); The Comedy Channel (seasons 1–2); Comedy Central (seasons 3–7); Sci-Fi Channel (seasons 8–10)	April 14, 2017	November 22, 2018	2 seasons, 20 episodes	86–94 min	English	Selected territories	
Slasher (season 2)	Horror anthology series	Chiller; Super Channel	October 17, 2017		1 season, 8 episodes	46–53 min	English	Selected territories	
Lucifer (seasons 4–6)	Fantasy/police procedural	Fox	May 8, 2019	September 10, 2021	3 seasons, 36 episodes	44–65 min	English	Worldwide except Austria and Germany	
Skam Italia (seasons 4–6)	Teen drama	TIMvision	May 15, 2020	January 18, 2024	3 seasons, 30 episodes	20–40 min	Italian	Italy	
