= Lists of ended Netflix original programming =

The following are lists of ended Netflix original programming by lustrums:

- List of ended Netflix original programming (2012–2015)
- List of ended Netflix original programming (2016–2020)
- List of ended Netflix original programming (2021–2025)
- List of ended Netflix original programming (2026–present)

== See also ==
- Lists of Netflix original films
- Lists of Netflix exclusive international distribution programming
- List of Netflix original programming
- List of Netflix original stand-up comedy specials
- List of Netflix India original programming
