= Shel Bachrach =

American insurance businessman (1944–2024)

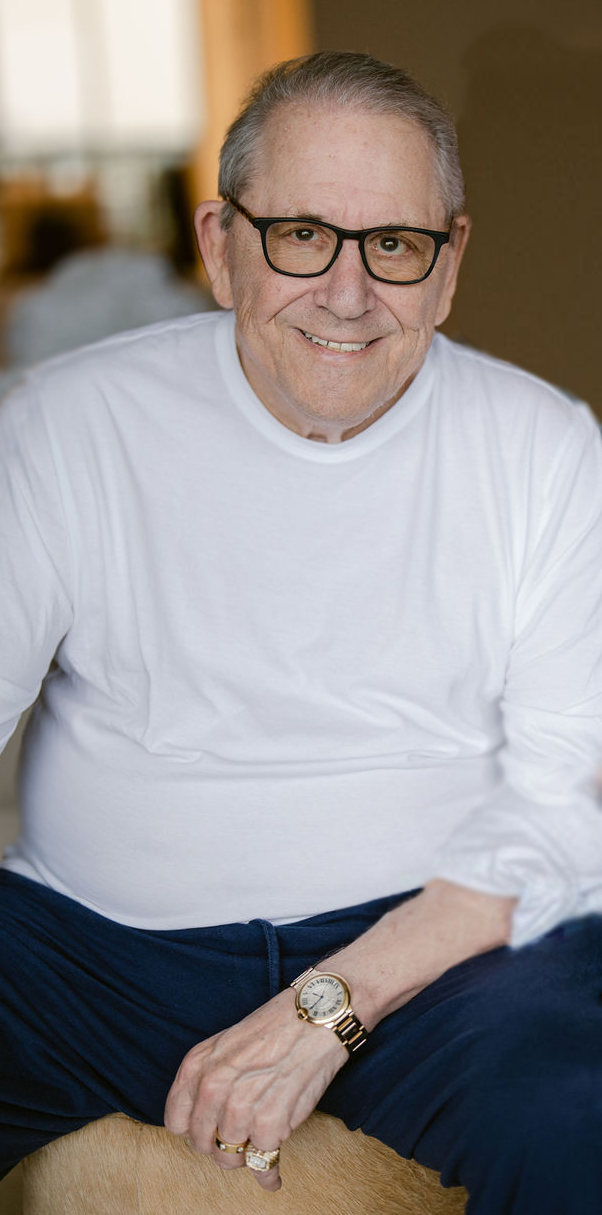
- Born: April 7, 1944; Detroit, Michigan, U.S.
- Died: July 8, 2024 (aged 80)
- Occupations: Chairman & CEO, Bachrach & Associates
- Spouse: Kathleen Wright
- Children: Laura Bachrach, Scott Bachrach, Ryan Bachrach, Courtney Bachrach

Sheldon Jay Bachrach (April 7, 1944 – July 8, 2024) was an American insurance broker, investor, businessman, and philanthropist.

Bachrach held positions as President of Entertainment and High Net Worth divisions for USI (acquired by Goldman Sachs), and Albert G. Ruben of Beverly Hills. He was awarded the Guinness World Record in 1990 for the largest life and disability policy ever written at the time, valued at over $140 million. He was the founder and President of Bachrach & Associates, co-founder and Partner of Extract Value, and Director of American Chariot.

== Professional history ==
Bachrach wrote his first insurance policy for a major entertainer in 1983 and followed with policies for entertainers like Neil Simon, Van Halen, and Kiss. Early in his career, Bachrach was able to write insurance policies for previously uninsurable positions.

Bachrach pioneered practices that are employed by companies worldwide, including policies for:

- Advertising commercial wrap-ups for Fortune 500s such as Coca-Cola, McDonald's, Ford Motors, Philip Morris, and Toyota;
- Drug-related filming delays for stars such as Courtney Love in The People vs. Larry Flynt
- Actors who pilot aircraft, such as Harrison Ford in the blockbuster Air Force One
- Aging key persons, such as acclaimed director Sir David Lean, for his last movie ever made;
- Severe medical conditions, such as for Academy Award-winning director/actor John Huston;
- Pregnant actresses during filming for actresses like Bette Midler;
- Magicians, entertainers, and "Big Cats" performers, including popular Las Vegas acts; and
- Winnings for some of television's longest-running game shows like The Price Is Right.

Bachrach appeared as an expert witness in Los Angeles County and Federal Court on Liability Insurance, including Errors & Omissions, Directors & Officers and Employment Practices Liability.

== Philanthropy ==
Bachrach was on the Board of ABCs at Saint John's Health Center, major contributor to Cedars-Sinai, LACMA, and other well-known Los Angeles institutions. The Bachrach Family is also on the Board of Governors at Cedars-Sinai, Members of the Amie Karen Cancer Fund for Children for over twenty years, Assistance League for over ten years, UNICEF, and a supporter of the Circle of Angels.

== Personal life and death ==
Shel Bachrach was married to Kathleen Wright Bachrach with four children and resided in his Bel Air estate with additional homes in Malibu, Palm Springs, and New York.

Bachrach died on July 8, 2024, at the age of 80.

== Film credits ==
Film title	Release year	Role
The Shadow Conspiracy	1997	production insurance provider (Albert G Ruben Insurance Services)
Evita	1996	production insurance provider (Albert G Ruben Insurance Services)
The People vs. Larry Flynt	1996	special thanks
Cutthroat Island	1995	production insurance provider
Color of Night	1994	insurance provider
Cliffhanger	1993	production insurance provider (Albert G Ruben Insurance Services)
Medicine Man	1992	insurance provider

Bachrach was also credited with providing insurance for television shows such as The Price Is Right, Miss Universe, Wanna Bet, Singing Bee, Lingo and First and Last.
