= Boca Juniors Confidential =

- Genre: Documentary
- Starring: Juan Pablo Varsky; Guillermo Barros Schelotto; Boca Juniors
- Country of origin: Argentina
- No. of seasons: 1
- No. of episodes: 4

Production
- Running time: 40–44 min.

Original release
- Network: Netflix
- Release: September 14, 2018

Boca Juniors Confidential is a 2018 Argentine docu-series, exploring the football team Boca Juniors at the coast of Argentina. It begins with the team's pre-season training, and ends with the final day of the season and team's championship race outcome, trying to win the Superliga again.

== Premise ==
Boca Juniors Confidential explores the Argentine football team Boca attempt at trying to win the Superliga again, interweening between on-pitch action and brief interviews.

== Cast ==
- Juan Pablo Varsky
- Guillermo Barros Schelotto
- Lisandro Magallán
- Carlos Tevez
- Wanchope Ábila
- Daniel Angelici
- Gustavo Barros Schelotto
- Darío Benedetto
- Fernando Gago
- Nahitan Nández
- Cristian Pavón
- Pablo Pérez
- Guillermo Sara
- Walter Bou
- Edwin Cardona
- Carolina Castaño
- Frank Fabra
- Leonardo Jara
- Gonzalo Maroni

== Release ==
It was released on September 14, 2018 on Netflix streaming.
