= The Unremarkable Juanquini =

2020 Spanish language television series

- Spanish: Chichipatos
- Genre: Comedy
- Created by: Dago García
- Starring: Antonio Sanint; Maria Cecilia Sanchez; Julián Cerati; Mariana Gómez; Júlio César Herrera
- Country of origin: Colombia
- Original language: Spanish
- No. of seasons: 2
- No. of episodes: 15

Production
- Running time: 24-39 minutes
- Production company: Caracol Televisión

Original release
- Network: Netflix
- Release: 15 May 2020 – 30 April 2021

The Unremarkable Juanquini (Spanish and Original Name is Chichipatos) is a Colombian comedy television series created by Dago García and produced by Caracol Televisión for Netflix. Starring Antonio Sanint, Maria Cecilia Sanchez, Julián Cerati, Mariana Gómez and Júlio César Herrera.

The first season premiered on Netflix on 15 May 2020, followed by a second season which premiered on 30 April 2021.

== Premise ==
The series revolves around a magician, Juanquini (Antonio Sanint), who pulls a trick that makes a most wanted criminal disappear.

== Cast ==
- Antonio Sanint as Juan Morales 'Juanquini'
- María Cecilia Sánchez as Margot
- Julián Cerati as Samuel
- Mariana Gómez as Monica
- Júlio César Herrera as El Capi González
- El Mindo as Lucho
- Jacques Toukhmanian as Queiroz
- Cristian Villamil as Ortiz
- Yurico Londoño as Agente Smith
- Biassini Segura as El Ñato

== Episodes ==
Series	Episodes	Originally released
1	7	15 May 2020
2	8	30 April 2021

=== Season 1 (2020) ===
No. overall	No. in season	Title	Directed by	Written by	Original release date
1	1	"An Invisible Father"	Juan Camilo Pinzon	Dago García	15 May 2020
2	2	"The Magician in His Labyrinth"	Juan Camilo Pinzon	Dago García	15 May 2020
3	3	"Extradition"	Juan Camilo Pinzon	Dago García	15 May 2020
4	4	"The Echoes of Absence"	Juan Camilo Pinzon	Dago García	15 May 2020
5	5	"A New Family"	Juan Camilo Pinzon	Dago García	15 May 2020
6	6	"Toccata and Flight"	Juan Camilo Pinzon	Dago García	15 May 2020
7	7	"Easy to Get Into, Hard to Get Out Of"	Juan Camilo Pinzon	Dago García	15 May 2020

=== Season 2 (2021) ===
No. overall	No. in season	Title	Directed by	Written by	Original release date
8	1	"You Can Learn by Getting Wasted"	Juan Camilo Pinzon	Dago García	30 April 2021
9	2	"Drunk's No Good! No Sir!"	Juan Camilo Pinzon	Dago García	30 April 2021
10	3	"Unity is Strength"	Juan Camilo Pinzon	Dago García	30 April 2021
11	4	"But I'm Still The King"	Juan Camilo Pinzon	Dago García	30 April 2021
12	5	"Till Death Do Us Part"	Juan Camilo Pinzon	Dago García	30 April 2021
13	6	"I Speak To You From Prison"	Juan Camilo Pinzon	Dago García	30 April 2021
14	7	"Toccata and Fugue 2"	Juan Camilo Pinzon	Dago García	30 April 2021
15	8	"Scandal"	Juan Camilo Pinzon	Dago García	30 April 2021

== Release ==
The Unremarkable Juanquini was released on 15 May 2020 on Netflix.
