= Lists of Netflix exclusive international distribution programming =

The following are lists of Netflix exclusive international distribution programs:

== Lists ==
- List of Netflix exclusive international distribution TV shows
- List of Netflix exclusive international distribution films

== See also ==
- Lists of ended Netflix original programming
- Lists of Netflix original films
- List of Netflix original programming
- List of Netflix original stand-up comedy specials
- List of Netflix India original programming
