= El Paseo (film) =

- Theatrical poster
- Directed by: Harold Trompetero
- Written by: Dago García
- Produced by: Dago García; Iván García
- Starring: Antonio Sanint; Carolina Gómez; María Margarita Girlado; Adelaida López; Miguel Canal; Luis Fernando Múnera; Álvaro Rodríguez; Carlos Serrato; Karoll Ma
- Cinematography: Manuel Castañeda
- Edited by: Carolina Silva; Dago García
- Music by: Jimmy Pulido
- Production company: Dago García Producciones
- Distributed by: Dago García Producciones; Caracol Televisión
- Release date: December 25, 2010
- Running time: 90 minutes
- Country: Colombia
- Language: Spanish

El Paseo (lit. 'The ride') is a 2010 Colombian road-comedy film directed by Harold Trompetero and starring Antonio Sanint and Carolina Gómez. The official Colombian release was on December 25, 2010.

== Plot ==
The film is about a family on vacation. After 11 years of continuous work, Alex Peinado decides to spend a well-earned holiday with his family. He goes on a road trip towards Cartagena, with his wife, his mother-in-law, his two teenage children and his dog Kaiser. But the journey is not his only motivation, as Alex hides a plan that requires them to reach their destination on time. The road trip will become the most incredible adventure, which puts at risk their arrival to the Colombian coast.

== Cast ==
Antonio Sanint as Alex Peinado
Carolina Gómez as Hortensia de Peinado
María Margarita Giraldo as Carmelita
Adelaida López as Milena Peinado
Miguel Canal as Octavio Peinado
Jack Villalobos as Káiser
Luis Fernando Múnera as Dr. Benítez
Álvaro Rodríguez as a Transit Police
Carlos Serrato as Cabeza Rapada chief

== Reception ==
=== Box office ===
With 127,460 spectators during the weekend of release, the Colombian film El Paseo leads box office in Colombia.

=== Critical ===
The film received more than 1 million viewers in less than 5 weeks in theaters.
