= List of ended Netflix original programming (2012–2015) =

These shows are worldwide or regional Netflix Originals and have either completed their runs or Netflix stopped producing episodes. A show is also assumed to have ended if there has been no confirmed news of renewal at least one year after the show's last episode was released.

== Drama ==
Title	Genre	Premiere	Finale	Seasons	Runtime	Notes
House of Cards	Political drama	February 1, 2013	November 2, 2018	6 seasons, 73 episodes	42–59 min	
Orange Is the New Black	Comedy drama	July 11, 2013	July 26, 2019	7 seasons, 91 episodes	50–92 min	
Marco Polo	Historical drama	December 12, 2014	July 1, 2016	2 seasons, 20 episodes	48–65 min	
Bloodline	Thriller	March 20, 2015	May 26, 2017	3 seasons, 33 episodes	48–68 min	
Daredevil	Superhero legal drama	April 10, 2015	October 19, 2018	3 seasons, 39 episodes	46–61 min	(Note: These shows were available at a time as Netflix originals, but have been since removed from the service.)
Sense8	Science fiction	June 5, 2015	June 8, 2018	2 seasons, 24 episodes	45–152 min	
Narcos	Crime drama	August 28, 2015	September 1, 2017	3 seasons, 30 episodes	43–60 min	
Jessica Jones	Superhero psychological thriller	November 20, 2015	June 14, 2019	3 seasons, 39 episodes	44–56 min	

== Comedy ==
Title	Genre	Premiere	Finale	Seasons	Runtime	Notes
Unbreakable Kimmy Schmidt	Comedy	March 6, 2015	May 12, 2020	4 seasons, 52 episodes	23–53 min	
Grace and Frankie	Comedy drama	May 8, 2015	April 29, 2022	7 seasons, 94 episodes	25–35 min	
Wet Hot American Summer: First Day of Camp	Satirical comedy	July 31, 2015		1 season, 8 episodes	27–30 min	
Master of None	Comedy drama	November 6, 2015	May 23, 2021	3 seasons, 25 episodes	20–57 min	
W/ Bob & David	Sketch comedy	November 13, 2015		1 season, 5 episodes	27–33 min	(Note: The episode list of these shows has been changed since the original release.)
Real Rob	Comedy	December 1, 2015	September 29, 2017	2 seasons, 16 episodes	24–38 min	

== Kids & family ==
Title	Genre	Premiere	Finale	Seasons	Runtime	Notes
Richie Rich	Sitcom	February 20, 2015	May 22, 2015	2 seasons, 21 episodes	21–23 min	
Project Mc^{2}	Comedy	August 7, 2015	November 7, 2017	6 parts, 26 episodes	22–34 min	

== Animation ==
=== Adult animation ===
Title	Genre	Premiere	Finale	Seasons	Runtime	Language	Notes
BoJack Horseman	Comedy drama	August 22, 2014	January 31, 2020	6 seasons, 77 episodes	25–27 min	English	
F Is for Family	Sitcom	December 18, 2015	November 25, 2021	5 seasons, 44 episodes	25–30 min	English	

=== Kids & family ===
Title	Premiere	Finale	Seasons	Runtime	Language	Notes
Ever After High	February 6, 2015	August 5, 2016	5 seasons, 17 episodes	23–47 min	English	

== Non-English language scripted ==
Title	Genre	Premiere	Finale	Seasons	Runtime	Language	Notes
Club de Cuervos	Comedy drama	August 7, 2015	January 26, 2019	4 seasons, 45 episodes	36–94 min	Spanish	

== Unscripted ==
=== Docuseries ===
Title	Subject	Premiere	Finale	Seasons	Runtime	Language	Notes
Making a Murderer	True crime	December 18, 2015	October 19, 2018	2 parts, 20 episodes	47–77 min	English	

== Continuations ==
Title	Genre	Previous network(s)	Premiere	Finale	Seasons	Runtime	Language	Notes
Trailer Park Boys (seasons 8–12)	Mockumentary	Showcase	September 5, 2014	March 30, 2018	5 seasons, 50 episodes	22–32 min	English	

== Specials ==
=== One-time ===
Title	Genre	Premiere	Runtime	Language	Notes
Trailer Park Boys: Swearnet Live	Mockumentary	October 1, 2014	1 h 15 min	English	
Trailer Park Boys: Live at the North Pole	Mockumentary	November 15, 2014	1 h 28 min	English	
BoJack Horseman Christmas Special: Sabrina's Christmas Wish	Animation	December 19, 2014	25 min	English	
Sense8: Creating the World	Making-of	August 8, 2015	25 min	English	
Trailer Park Boys: Drunk, High and Unemployed Live in Austin	Mockumentary	December 9, 2015	1 h 15 min	English	
Marco Polo: One Hundred Eyes	Period drama	December 26, 2015	28 min	English	

== Regional original programming ==
These shows are originals, because Netflix commissioned or acquired them and had their premier on the service, but they are not available worldwide.

=== Drama ===
Title	Genre	Premiere	Finale	Seasons	Runtime	Netflix exclusive region	Notes
Hemlock Grove	Horror/thriller	April 19, 2013	October 23, 2015	3 seasons, 33 episodes	45–58 min	Selected territories	

=== Comedy ===
Title	Genre	Premiere	Finale	Seasons	Runtime	Netflix exclusive region	Notes
Bad Samaritans	Sitcom	March 31, 2013		1 season, 5 episodes	30 min	Selected territories	

=== Animation ===
==== Kids & Family ====
Title	Premiere	Finale	Seasons	Runtime	Language	Netflix exclusive region	Notes
Turbo Fast	December 24, 2013	February 5, 2016	3 seasons, 52 episodes	23 min	English	Selected territories	
VeggieTales in the House	November 26, 2014	September 23, 2016	4 seasons, 52 episodes	23 min	English	Selected territories	
All Hail King Julien	December 19, 2014	December 1, 2017	5 seasons, 65 episodes	23 min	English	Selected territories	
The Adventures of Puss in Boots	January 16, 2015	January 26, 2018	6 seasons, 78 episodes	22–24 min	English	Selected territories	
Dragons: Race to the Edge	June 26, 2015	February 16, 2018	6 seasons, 78 episodes	22–23 min	English	Selected territories	
Dinotrux	August 14, 2015	August 18, 2017	5 seasons, 52 episodes	23 min	English	Selected territories	
The Mr. Peabody & Sherman Show	October 9, 2015	April 21, 2017	4 seasons, 52 episodes	23 min	English	Selected territories	
Popples	October 30, 2015	July 24, 2016	3 seasons, 26 episodes	24 min	English	Selected territories	
Care Bears & Cousins	November 6, 2015	February 5, 2016	2 seasons, 12 episodes	22 min	English	Selected territories	
Dawn of the Croods	December 24, 2015	July 7, 2017	4 seasons, 52 episodes	23 min	English	Selected territories	

=== Unscripted ===
==== Docuseries ====
Title	Subject	Premiere	Finale	Seasons	Runtime	Language	Netflix exclusive region	Notes
Russell Peters vs. the World	Stand-up comedy	October 14, 2013		1 season, 4 episodes	26–29 min	English	Selected territories	

=== Co-productions ===
These shows may not be available worldwide due to the distributing deal with the co-production partner networks.

Title	Genre	Partner/Country	Premiere	Finale	Seasons	Runtime	Language	Netflix exclusive region	Notes
Lilyhammer	Comedy drama	NRK/Norway	February 6, 2012	November 21, 2014	3 seasons, 24 episodes	43–58 min	English	All other markets	
Between	Science fiction	City/Canada	May 21, 2015	July 1, 2016	2 seasons, 12 episodes	43–44 min	English	All other markets	
Terrace House: Boys & Girls in the City	Reality television	Fuji Television/Japan	September 2, 2015	September 27, 2016	2 parts, 46 episodes	24–38 min	Japanese	All other markets	
Atelier	Coming of age drama	Fuji Television/Japan	December 1, 2015		1 season, 13 episodes	43–51 min	Japanese	All other markets	

=== Continuations ===
Title	Genre	Previous network(s)	Premiere	Finale	Seasons	Runtime	Language	Netflix exclusive region	Notes
Arrested Development (seasons 4–5)	Comedy	Fox	May 26, 2013	March 15, 2019	2 seasons, 38 episodes	23–48 min	English	Selected territories	
Star Wars: The Clone Wars (season 6)	Animated science fiction	Cartoon Network	March 7, 2014		1 season, 13 episodes	19–26 min	English	Selected territories	(Note: These shows were cancelled by Netflix, but were picked up by another channel or streaming service for additional seasons.)
The Killing (season 4)	Crime drama	AMC	August 1, 2014		1 season, 6 episodes	42–59 min	English	Selected territories	
Longmire (seasons 4–6)	Crime drama	A&E Network	September 10, 2015	November 17, 2017	3 seasons, 30 episodes	42–71 min	English	Selected territories	
