= Juan Pablo Varsky =

Argentine sports journalist

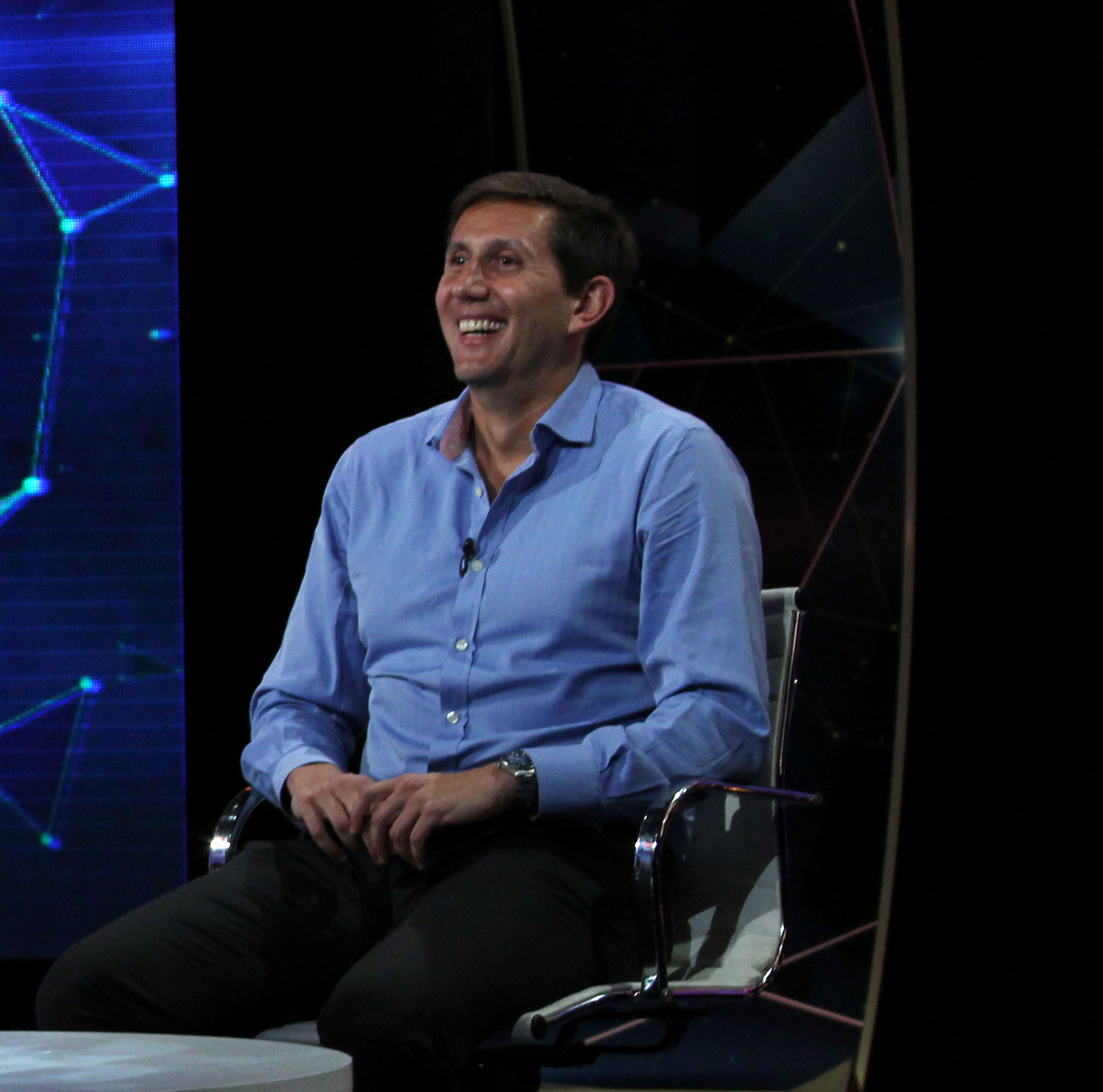
Juan Pablo Varsky at the studios of Televisión Pública Argentina.

Juan Pablo Varsky is an Argentine sports journalist. He works at the newspaper La Nación, at the TV program "Más que Fútbol" and the radio program "No somos nadie". He made a cameo in the 2012 Argentine telenovela Graduados.
