= No Time for Shame =

2019 Argentine reality television show

- Genre: Reality television
- Starring: Edwin Salinas; Santiago Artemis
- Country of origin: Argentina
- Original language: Spanish
- No. of seasons: 1
- No. of episodes: 6

Production
- Running time: 38-47 minutes

Original release
- Network: Netflix
- Release: 19 November 2019

No Time for Shame is a 2019 reality television series. The premise revolves around Argentinian fashion designer Santiago Artemis.

== Cast ==
- Edwin Salinas
- Santiago Artemis

== Release ==
No Time for Shame was released on November 19, 2019, on Netflix.
