= List of ended Netflix original programming (2026–present) =

These shows are worldwide or regional Netflix Originals and have either completed their runs or Netflix stopped producing episodes. A show is also assumed to have ended if there has been no confirmed news of renewal at least one year after the show's last episode was released.

== Drama ==
Title	Genre	Premiere	Finale	Seasons	Runtime	Notes
Run Away	Thriller drama	January 1, 2026		8 episodes	41–50 min	(Note: Miniseries)
His & Hers	Psychological thriller	January 8, 2026		6 episodes	39–47 min	
Something Very Bad Is Going to Happen	Horror	March 26, 2026		8 episodes	40–59 min	
The Boroughs	Science fiction drama	May 21, 2026		1 season, 8 episodes	40–55 min	
The Witness	Crime drama	June 4, 2026		3 episodes	47–57 min	
I Will Find You	Crime drama	June 18, 2026		8 episodes	35–47 min	
Monster: The Lizzie Borden Story	Crime thriller	September 17, 2026		8 episodes	39–63 min	
East of Eden	Historical drama	October 1, 2026		7 episodes	51–68 min	
Below	Supernatural drama	October 8, 2026		6 episodes	37–47 min	
The Altruists	Biographical drama	November 19, 2026		8 episodes	50–60 min	

== Comedy ==
Title	Genre	Premiere	Finale	Seasons	Runtime	Notes
How to Get to Heaven from Belfast	Comedy drama	February 12, 2026		1 season, 8 episodes	46–57 min	
Vladimir	Comedy drama	March 5, 2026		8 episodes	27–32 min	

== Animation ==
=== Adult animation ===
Title	Genre	Premiere	Finale	Seasons	Runtime	Language	Notes
Strip Law	Comedy	February 20, 2026		1 season, 10 episodes	25–27 min	English	
My 2 Cents	Comedy	May 27, 2026		8 episodes	24–52 min	Italian	

== Non-English language scripted ==
=== Korean ===
Title	Genre	Premiere	Finale	Seasons	Runtime	Notes
Can This Love Be Translated?	Romantic comedy	January 16, 2026		12 episodes	56–82 min	
The Art of Sarah	Mystery thriller	February 13, 2026		8 episodes	39–51 min	
Boyfriend on Demand	Science fantasy romantic comedy	March 6, 2026		10 episodes	50–68 min	
If Wishes Could Kill	Young adult horror	April 24, 2026		8 episodes	36–52 min	
The Wonderfools	Superhero comedy	May 15, 2026		8 episodes	60–92 min	
Teach You a Lesson	Action school drama	June 5, 2026		10 episodes	52–72 min	
Notes from the Last Row	Suspense psychological drama	June 26, 2026		6 episodes	55–70 min	
The East Palace	Dark fantasy period drama	July 17, 2026		8 episodes	46–59 min	
Our Sticky Love	Romantic comedy	August 7, 2026		12 episodes	42–67 min	
Mousetrap	Mystery thriller	August 28, 2026		10 episodes	49–64 min	
The Scandal	Historical romantic drama	September 18, 2026		8 episodes	48–80 min	
Take Charge of My Heart	Romantic fantasy comedy	October 9, 2026		10 episodes	59–67 min	
Dead-End Job	Mystery horror fantasy	October 30, 2026		8 episodes	33–44 min	
The Blue Road	Crime thriller	November 20, 2026		8 episodes	35–57 min	

=== Spanish ===
Title	Genre	Premiere	Finale	Seasons	Runtime	Notes
That Night	Crime thriller	March 13, 2026		6 episodes	38–44 min	
Someone Has to Know	Crime drama	April 15, 2026		8 episodes	32–44 min	
Berlin and the Lady with an Ermine	Heist crime drama	May 15, 2026		8 episodes	41–81 min	
I'm Not Afraid	Crime mystery thriller	July 8, 2026		6 episodes	42–49 min	
The Map of Longing	Drama	July 17, 2026		6 episodes	35–53 min	
All the Truth in My Lies	Romance drama	August 28, 2026		5 episodes	32–48 min	
My Sad Dead	Horror	September 24, 2026		4 episodes	47–56 min	
The Final Problem	Murder mystery	September 25, 2026		4 episodes	35–57 min	
Under Siege	Historical thriller	November 6, 2026		8 episodes	46–64 min	
Murder in Galicia	True crime drama	November 13, 2026		3 episodes	43–44 min	
Gordon	True crime thriller	November 18, 2026		7 episodes	37–53 min	

=== Other ===
Title	Genre	Premiere	Finale	Seasons	Runtime	Language	Notes
Land of Sin	Crime drama	January 2, 2026		5 episodes	39–46 min	Swedish	
Lead Children	Historical drama	February 11, 2026		6 episodes	52–66 min	Polish	
The Museum of Innocence	Drama	February 13, 2026		9 episodes	33–60 min	Turkish	
Soul Mate	Boys' love	May 14, 2026		8 episodes	33–47 min	Japanese	
The Doll	Historical drama	September 16, 2026		6 episodes	50–72 min	Polish	
The Trap	Psychological thriller	October 13, 2026		6 episodes	43–52 min	German	
A Couple of Lies	Psychological thriller	October 30, 2026		4 episodes	38–48 min	Swedish	

== Unscripted ==
=== Docuseries ===
Title	Subject	Premiere	Finale	Seasons	Runtime	Language	Notes
Paparazzi King	Biography	January 9, 2026		5 episodes	44–63 min	Italian	
Take That	Music	January 27, 2026		3 episodes	50–52 min	English	
A Friend, a Murderer	True crime	March 5, 2026		3 episodes	38–47 min	Danish	
The TikTok Killer	True crime	March 6, 2026		2 episodes	39–54 min	Spanish	
The Prosecutor	True crime	March 26, 2026		3 episodes	53–62 min	Spanish	
The Predator of Seville	True crime	March 27, 2026		3 episodes	44–50 min	English	
Ronaldinho: The One and Only	Sports	April 16, 2026		3 episodes	53–57 min	Portuguese	
Hulk Hogan: Real American	Biography	April 22, 2026		4 episodes	45–77 min	English	
Should I Marry a Murderer?	True crime	April 29, 2026		3 episodes	44–56 min	English	
Kylie	Music	May 20, 2026		3 episodes	56–69 min	English	
James.	Sports	May 21, 2026		3 episodes	43–58 min	Spanish	
Rafa	Sports	May 29, 2026		4 episodes	53–61 min	Spanish	
Norway: The Dark Horse	Sports	June 9, 2026		2 episodes	59–61 min	Norwegian	
The Root of the Game	Sports	June 20, 2026		3 episodes	36–41 min	Portuguese	
Tyson	Sports	October 13, 2026		4 episodes	60–73 min	English	
The Fall of El Mayo	Organized crime/True crime	October 29, 2026		3 episodes	57–67 min	Spanish	

== Specials ==
=== One-time ===
Title	Genre	Premiere	Runtime	Language	Notes
One Last Adventure: The Making of Stranger Things 5	Making of documentary	January 12, 2026	2 h 2 min	English	
Is It Cake? Valentines	Baking competition	February 4, 2026	44 min	English	
Yoh! Bestie	Comedy	February 6, 2026	1 h 35 min	Zulu	
Love Is Blind: The Reunion	Dating show	March 11, 2026	1 h 32 min	English	
Making of Brazil 70	Making of	May 29, 2026	6 min	Portuguese	
Heartstopper Forever	Teen drama	July 17, 2026	1 h 54 min	English	
Heartstopper: Ending on a Hi	Behind the scenes documentary	July 24, 2026	36 min	English	
Nando Between Two Worlds − A Sintonia Film	Crime drama	August 12, 2026	1 h 49 min	Portuguese	
Let's Marry Harry: The Reunion	Dating show	August 26, 2026	1 h 23 min	English	
Turning Point: Generation 9/11	Documentary	September 2, 2026	1 h 39 min	English	

== Regional original programming ==
These shows are originals, because Netflix commissioned or acquired them and had their premier on the service, but they are not available worldwide.

=== Non-English language scripted ===
Title	Genre	Premiere	Finale	Seasons	Runtime	Language	Netflix exclusive region	Notes
A Day Like No Other	Biopic	October 9, 2026		8 episodes	38–47 min	Spanish	Latin America and Spain	

=== Unscripted ===
==== Docuseries ====
Title	Subject	Premiere	Finale	Seasons	Runtime	Language	Netflix exclusive region	Notes
The Trials of Winnie Mandela	Biography	April 23, 2026		7 episodes	51–59 min	English	Selected territories	

=== Co-productions ===
These shows may not be available worldwide due to the distributing deal with the co-production partner networks.

Title	Genre	Partner/Country	Premiere	Finale	Seasons	Runtime	Language	Netflix exclusive region	Notes
The Bombing of Pan Am 103	True crime drama	BBC One/United Kingdom	July 30, 2026		6 episodes	57–60 min	English	All other markets	

=== Specials ===
==== One-time ====
Title	Genre	Premiere	Runtime	Language	Netflix exclusive region	Notes
Bad Exorcist: Seminary	Adult animated horror comedy	May 27, 2026	30 min	Polish	Poland	
Storm on Sesame Street	Educational	August 3, 2026	30 min	English	All markets excluding Austria, Germany, and Switzerland	
