= SanPa: Sins of the Savior =

- Genre: Documentary
- Developed by: Gianluca Neri
- Directed by: Cosima Spender
- Starring: Vincenzo Andreucci; Antonio Boschini; Fabio Cantelli
- Composer: Eduardo Aram
- Country of origin: Italy
- Original language: Italian
- No. of seasons: 1
- No. of episodes: 5

Production
- Producers: Gianluca Neri, Nicola Allieta
- Editor: Valerio Bonelli
- Running time: 55–64 minutes
- Production company: Quarantadue

Original release
- Network: Netflix
- Release: 30 December 2020

SanPa: Sins of the Savior is a 2020 docuseries directed by Cosima Spender, developed by Gianluca Neri and produced by Gianluca Neri and Nicola Allieta, starring Vincenzo Andreucci, Antonio Boschini and Fabio Cantelli. The series documents the work of Vincenzo Muccioli, who cared for addicts during a heroin crisis, and the controversies that arose from his work.

== Cast ==
- Vincenzo Andreucci
- Antonio Boschini
- Fabio Cantelli
- Walter Delogu
- Antonella De Stefani
- Andrea Muccioli
- Luciano Nigro
- Fabio Mini
- Paolo Negri
- Red Ronnie
- Angelo Battistini
- Leonardo Montecchi
- Pier Andrea Muccioli
- Sergio Pierini
- Sebastiano Berla
- Andrea Delogu
- Nicolò Licata
- Giuseppe Maranzano
- Paolo Severi
- Sebastiano Berla
- Rita Maranzano

== Episodes ==
No.	Title	Original release date
1	"Episode 1"	December 30, 2020
2	"Episode 2"	December 30, 2020
3	"Episode 3"	December 30, 2020
4	"Episode 4"	December 30, 2020
5	"Episode 5"	December 30, 2020

== Release ==
SanPa: Sins of the Savior was released on December 30, 2020, on Netflix.
