= Until Dawn (TV series) =

2019 French reality television show

- French: Jusqu'à L'aube
- Genre: Reality television
- Starring: Ornella Fleury; Alban Ivanov; Ahmed Sylla
- Country of origin: France
- Original language: French
- No. of seasons: 1
- No. of episodes: 10

Production
- Running time: 17-25 minutes

Original release
- Network: Netflix
- Release: 10 January 2020

Until Dawn (French: Jusqu'à L'aube) is a 2019 reality television show. The premise revolves around three comedians, Ornella Fleury, Alban Ivanov and Ahmed Sylla, who spend from midnight until dawn in a spooky place.

== Cast ==
- Ornella Fleury
- Alban Ivanov
- Ahmed Sylla

== Release ==
Until Dawn was released on January 10, 2020, on Netflix.
