= Girls Incarcerated =

- Also known as: Girls Incarcerated: Young and Locked Up
- Genre: Documentary
- Country of origin: United States
- No. of seasons: 2
- No. of episodes: 16

Production
- Executive producers: Nick Rigg; David George; Jordana Hochman; Bianca Barnes-Williams; Royd Chung; Stuart Cabb; Lisa Kean
- Production locations: Madison, Indiana; La Porte, Indiana
- Editor: Kimberly Pellnat: Dan Nelson

Original release
- Network: Netflix
- Release: March 2, 2018 – June 21, 2019

Girls Incarcerated: Young and Locked Up is an American documentary television series released on Netflix on March 2, 2018, that initially followed the teenage inmates of the Madison Juvenile Correctional Facility in Madison, Indiana which has since been closed down. In season 2, the focus shifted to the teenage inmates of LaPorte Juvenile. Netflix did not officially renew the series for a third season and a release date has not been scheduled.

== Episodes ==
=== Season 1 (2018) ===
No.	Title	Original release date
1	"Chapter 1: The Girls of Madison"	March 2, 2018
Brianna likes being a "bad girl" but knows she needs to change. Newcomer Paige rubs feisty Heidi the wrong way. Chrissy and Aubrey await their release.
2	"Chapter 2: Wait Until We Meet Again"	March 2, 2018
Trouble finds Aubrey on the outside. Najwa finishes her time, but can't go home without a guardian. The girls say goodbye to a beloved counselor.
3	"Chapter 3: Mean Girls"	March 2, 2018
Brianna and her friends feud with Faith, an outsider. Paige lands in time out, disappointing her dad. Back with her family, Chrissy gets a fresh start.
4	"Chapter 4: Where the Story Begins"	March 2, 2018
Sarah, whose mom got her addicted to heroin, returns to Madison. Taryn tries to forgive herself after a friend's death. Family Day stirs up memories.
5	"Chapter 5: Love In Lockup"	March 2, 2018
Soft-spoken Alexis falls for Armani, who helps her cope with a traumatic past. Brianna's dad lets her down again. Chrissy is thriving on the outside.
6	"Chapter 6: High Expectations"	March 2, 2018
Courtney is on track to graduate high school at Madison and has plans for college. But Brianna's future is uncertain as her release date approaches.
7	"Chapter 7: My Life Story"	March 2, 2018
Alexis worries about losing Armani because of drama that went around. Cassie is afraid to return home to a neighborhood plagued by drugs and violence. Heidi opens up about her past.
8	"Chapter 8: Moving Mountains"	March 2, 2018
Heidi's release date gets moved after she acts out. Paige shares a powerful poem at Madison's talent show. Najwa celebrates her 16th birthday behind bars.

=== Season 2 (2019) ===
No.	Title	Original release date
1	"The Girls of La Porte"	June 21, 2019
Aberegg hopes her dad will visit. Jealousy causes drama between Stokes and Rose. Hale recounts how she used drugs to cope with her father's death.
2	"The Graduates"	June 21, 2019
As the girls get ready to graduate, teen mom Kristler struggles with depression, while Stokes and Hale have poignant reunions with their mothers.
3	"Do As I Say, Not As I Do"	June 21, 2019
With her mom facing jail time, Rose's home life hangs in the balance. Moody tries to be a role model to her younger cousin. Davis disrespects Galipeau.
4	"Visitation Day"	June 21, 2019
Reyes returns to LaPorte after violating parole. Thomas worries about disappointing her grandma. Aberegg gets an unexpected visitor on Family Day.
5	"The Boiling Point"	June 21, 2019
When Rose is attacked, the girls face serious consequences. Johnson has an emotional breakdown, and Thomas's temper lands her in trouble again.
6	"My Past Doesn't Define Me"	June 21, 2019
Depressed on her mom's birthday, Reyes finds comfort in her grandma. Davis and Johnson give conflict resolution a try. Aberegg's placement is in limbo.
7	"The Life Ahead"	June 21, 2019
Rose and Aberegg get ready to leave LaPorte. Kristler makes a sweet gesture to Galipeau. Reyes's relationship with her girlfriend takes an ugly turn.
8	"A Second Chance?"	June 21, 2019
Aberegg struggles to stay clean on the outside. Reyes's retaliation puts her release date in jeopardy. Kristler reflects on the progress she has made.
