= Southern Survival =

- Genre: Reality show
- Country of origin: United States
- Original language: English
- No. of seasons: 1
- No. of episodes: 8

Production
- Running time: 25-32 minutes

Original release
- Network: Netflix
- Release: July 3, 2020

Southern Survival is a 2020 reality television series. The premise revolves around the BattlBox crew who test outdoor and survival gear with extreme methods.

== Episodes ==
No.	Title	Original release date
1	"Fire"	July 3, 2020
2	"Escape"	July 3, 2020
3	"Rescue"	July 3, 2020
4	"Cutting Edge"	July 3, 2020
5	"Fear"	July 3, 2020
6	"Hurricane"	July 3, 2020
7	"Vacation Survival"	July 3, 2020
8	"Disaster Strikes"	July 3, 2020

== Release ==
Southern Survival was released on July 3, 2020, on Netflix.
