= Dago García =

Colombian librettist, producer and filmmaker (born 1962)

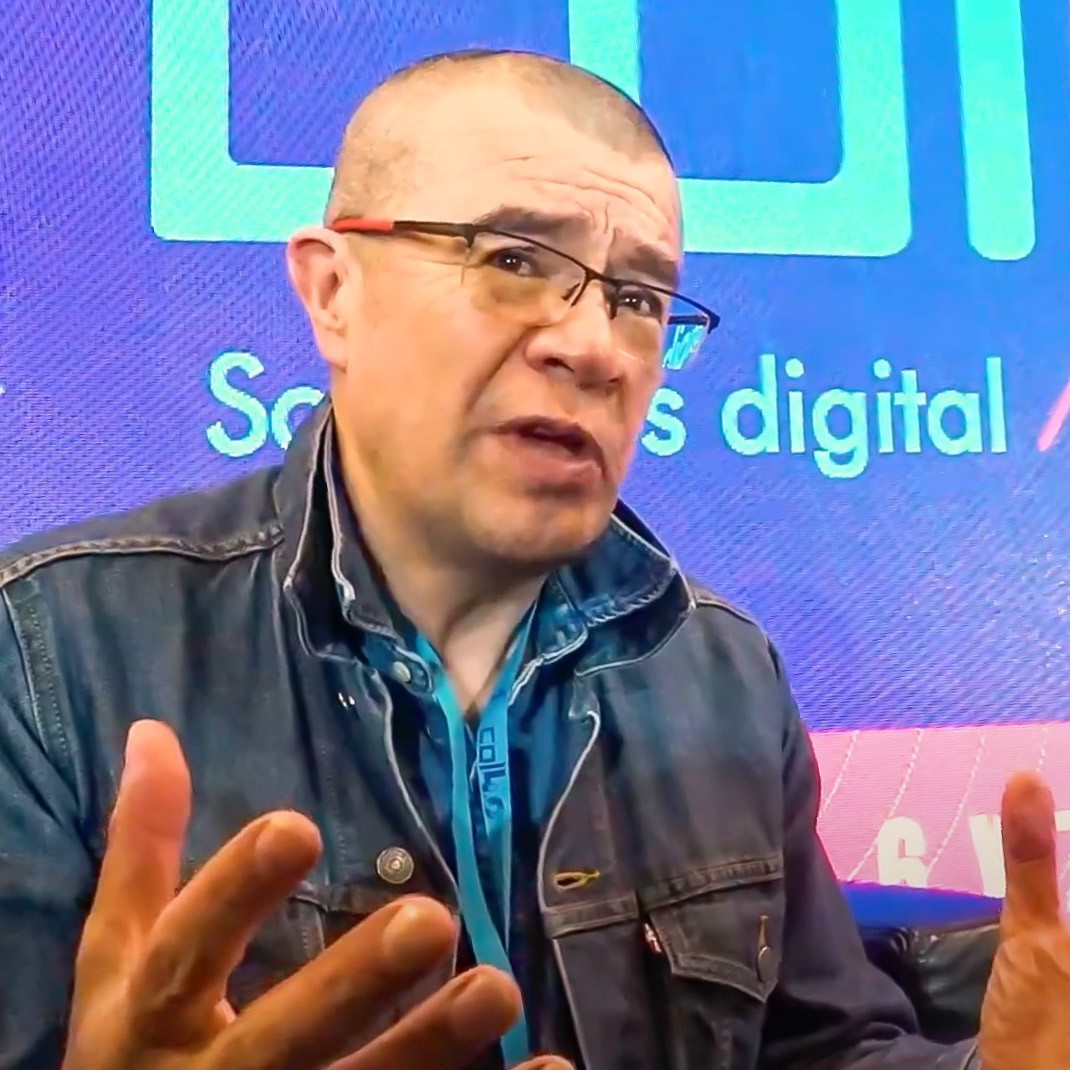
Dago García

Darío Armando García Granados, better known as Dago García (Bogota, 11 February 1962), is a screenwriter, film producer, director, editor and social communicator. He works currently as production vice-president of Colombian private television network Canal Caracol. He is one of Colombia's most well-known screenwriters.

== Personal life ==
Dago García has a degree in Social Communication from Universidad Externado. García was married to actress Martha Osorio, with whom he has two daughters. From 2000 on he has been in a relationship with journalist María Mercedes (Mechaz) Sánchez. His brother, Mario Iván García Granados, is currently an executive producer of Dago García Producciones, the producing company he founded. García also used to play as DJ in the well-known “Quiebracanto” pub in Bogota.

== Work ==
Dago García has been writing for television, theatre and cinema from the 90's, during which time he has written and produced more than thirty series and soap operas (some in association with Luis Felipe Salamanca), a fellow graduate from University Externado of Colombia. Among his creations are popular soap operas “Pedro el Escamoso” (2001), “Pecados capitales” (2002), and “La saga” (2004), among numerous others, which have obtained him national and Latin American awards like Simón Bolívar, India Catalina, Tv y Novelas, and El Tiempo for Best Screenwriting and Best Soap opera. He also obtained the prize to Best Screenwriting and Best Producing Company in the Latin American meeting of soap operas of 2004, in Uruguay.

In addition to his work in soap operas, Dago García has been working prolifically in producing and writing movies. "La mujer del piso alto" and "Posición viciada" both obtained the Cinemateca Distrital 25 years award Best Script, and were nominated by Colombia to the Goya Awards in 1998. His Es mejor ser rico que pobre participated in the Official Selection in the Festivals of Cartagena, Chicago, Montreal, Miami, and Villaverdey.

"Dago García Producciones" was created by him and Juan Carlos Velásquez in 1995, and from 1999 has managed to produce a film every year aimed at the general public in Colombia. García has been producer, screenwriter and co-editor of several films with the company. Despite receiving very negative reviews from critics, these movies have proved to be quite successful at the box office in Colombia, grossing on occasion more than Hollywood films.

García has also been teacher of screen writing for many universities in Colombia (Externado, the Javeriana, Jorge Tadeo Lozano, Rosary, Central University, and Minuto de Dios) and in Cuba (International School of Cinema and Television of Saint Antonio of the Bathrooms).

=== Filmography ===
Year	Film	Director	Writer	Producer	Editor	Notes
1995	La Mujer del Piso Alto	No	Yes	Yes	No	Co-screenwriter with Ricardo Coral
1997	Posición Viciada	No	Yes	Yes	No	
1999	Es Mejor ser Rico que Pobre	No	Yes	Yes	No	
2000	Kalibre 35	No	Yes	Yes	Yes	Co-screenwriter with Raúl García; Co-edited with Hugo Ardila, Luis F. Delgado, Raúl García and Frank Rojas
2001	La Pena Máxima	No	Yes	Yes	Yes	Co-screenwriter with Luis Felipe Salamanca based on the story "Un día de fútbol" by Jose Luis Varela; Co-edited with Monica Cifuentes
2002	Te Busco	No	Yes	Yes	No	
2003	El Carro	No	Yes	Yes	No	
2004	Colombianos, un acto de fe	No	No	Yes	No	
2004	La Esquina	No	Yes	Yes	Yes	Co-screenwriter with Enrique Carriazo
2005	Mi abuelo, mi papá y yo	Yes	Yes	Yes	No	Co-director with Juan Carlos Vásquez
2006	Las Cartas del Gordo	Yes	Yes	Yes	No	Co-director with Juan Carlos Vásquez
2007	Muertos de susto	No	Yes	Yes	No	
2008	Ni te cases, ni te embarques	No	Yes	Yes	Yes	Co-screenwriter with César Bentacur; Co-edited with Ricardo Coral
2009	In fraganti	No	Yes	Yes	Yes	Co-edited with Juan Camilo Pinzon and Carolina Silva
2010	El Paseo	No	Yes	Yes	Yes	Co-edited with Carolina Silva
2011	El escritor de telenovelas	No	Yes	Yes	Yes	Co-edited with Carolina Silva
2012	La Captura	Yes	Yes	Yes	No	Co-director with Juan Carlos Vásquez
2012	Mi gente linda, mi gente bella	No	Yes	Yes	Yes	Co-edited with Carolina Silva
2012	El paseo 2	No	Yes	Yes	Yes	Also story with Fernando Lara; Co-edited with Carolina Silva
2013	De Rolling por Colombia	No	No	No	Yes	Co-edited with Carolina Silva; Also script consultant
2013	El Control	No	Yes	Yes	Yes	Co-edited with Carolina Silva
2013	El paseo 3	No	Yes	Yes	Yes	Co-edited with Carolina Silva
2014	Carta al Niño Dios	No	Yes	Yes	Yes	Co-edited with Carolina Silva
2014	Uno al año no hace daño	No	Yes	Yes	Yes	Co-edited with Carolina Silva
2015	Shakespare	Yes	Yes	Yes	Yes	Co-edited with Carolina Silva
2015	El Abrazo de la Serpiente	No	No	Supporting producer	No	With the support of Dago García Producciones and Caracol Television
2015	Regue chicken	Yes	Yes	Yes	Yes	Also story with María Mercedes Sánchez; Co-edited with Carolina Silva
2015	Vivo en el Limbo	Yes	Yes	Yes	Yes	Co-screenwriter with Roberto Flores Prieto and Carlos Franco; Co-edited with Carolina Silva
2015	Uno al año no hace daño 2	No	Yes	Yes	Yes	Co-edited with Carolina Silva
2016	Polvo Calvanerro	No	Yes	Yes	Yes	Co-edited with Carolina Silva
2016	El Lamento	No	Yes	Yes	Yes	Co-screenwriter with Gina Ortega; Co-edited with Juan Camilo Pinzon, Carolina Silva and Julio Cesar Viveros
2016	El Coco	No	Yes	Yes	Yes	Co-edited with Carolina Silva
2016	El paseo 4	No	Yes	Yes	Yes	Also story with Fernando Lara; Co-edited with Carolina Silva
2017	El País más feliz del mundo	No	Yes	Yes	Yes	Co-edited with Carolina Silva
2017	El coco 2	No	Yes	Yes	Yes	Co-edited with Carolina Silva
2017	Agente Ñero Ñero 7: Comando Jungla	No	No	Supporting producer	No	With the support of Dago García Producciones and Caracol Television
2017	El paseo de Teresa	No	Yes	Yes	Yes	Co-edited with Carolina Silva
2018	Tuya, mía...te la apuesto (La Pena Maxíma)	No	Yes	Yes	Yes	Mexican Remake of his film "La Pena Maxima" from 2002 co-written with Luis Felipe Salamanca based on th short story "Un día de fútbol" by Jose Luis Varela; Co-screenwriter with Felipe Salamanca and Jose Luis Varela; Co-edited with Carolina Silva
2018	Sal	No	No	Associate producer	No	Associate producers by Dago García Producciones and Caracol Television
2018	Pájaros de Verano	No	No	Associate producer	No	Associate producers by Dago García Producciones and Caracol Television
2018	El Reality	No	Yes	Yes	Yes	Co-edited with Carolina Silva
2018	El Man del Porno	No	No	Yes	No	
2018	El Paseo 5: El Paseo de Oficina	No	Yes	Yes	Yes	Co-edited with Carolina Silva
2018	Niña errante	No	No	Supporting producer	No	With the support of Dago García Producciones and Caracol Television
2018	Los Fierros	No	No	Yes	No	
2019	La Surcursal	No	Yes	Yes	Yes	Co-edited with Carolina Silva
2019	Boyacoman y la esmeralda sagrada	No	No	Supporting producer	No	With the support of Dago García Producciones and Carcol Television
2019	Los Ajenos Fútbol Club	No	No	Yes	No	
2019	El Coco 3	No	Yes	Yes	Yes	Co-edited with Carolina Silva
2019	Al son que me toquen bailo	No	Yes	Yes	Yes	Co-edited with Carolina Silva
2020	El Olvido que Seremos	No	No	Yes	No	
2021	Lokillo en: Mi Otra Yo	No	Yes	Yes	Yes	Co-screenwriter with César Bentacu, Yedinson Flores and Juan Pablo Martínez; Co-edited with Carolina Silva
2021	El Paseo 6	No	Yes	Yes	Yes	Co-edited with Carolina Silva
2022	Un Rabón con Corazón	No	Yes	Yes	Yes	Co-edited with Carolina Silva
2022	El Último Hombre Sobre la Tierra	No	Yes	Yes	Yes	Co-edited with Carolina Silva
2022	Gospel	No	Yes	No	No	
2023	El Actor, El Director y La Guionista	Yes	Yes	Yes	Yes	Co-edited with Carolina Silva

=== Television ===
Year	Title	Writer	Producer	Director	Notes
1990	El Pasado no Perdona	Yes	No	No	150 episodes; Co-writer with Luis Felipe Salamanca
1990-1991	Te Voy a enseñar querer	Yes	No	No	128 episodes; Co-writer with Luis Felipe Salamanca
1991	Asunción	Yes	No	No	TV-miniseries; Co-writer with Luis Felipe Salamanca
1992	La Pantera	Yes	No	No	10 episodes; Co-writer with Luis Felipe Salamanca
1992-1993	El Último Beso	Yes	No	No	100 episodes;
1993-1994	Pasiones Secretas	Yes	No	No	215 episodes; Co-writer with Humberto 'Kiko' Uliveri and Luis Felipe Salamanca
1996	La sombra del deseo	Yes	No	No	110 episodes; Co-writer with Luis Felipe Salamanca
1996	Candela	Yes	No	No	116 episodes; Co-writer with Ramon Jimena
1997-1998	Dios se lo pague	Adaptation	Yes	No	259 episodes
1998	Tierra de Nadie	Yes	No	No	TV-movie
1998-1999	Tres veces Sofía	Story	No	No	220 episodes; Story with Luis Felipe Salamanca
1999	La Guerra de las rosas	Yes	Yes	No	161 episodes; Co-writer with Luis Felipe Salamanca and Helena Valencia
1999	Julius	Yes	Yes	No	160 episodes; Script with Luis Felipe Salamanca
2000	El tío Alberto	Yes	No	No	129 episodes Co-writer with Luis Felipe Salamnca
2000	María Rosa, buscame una esposa	Yes	No	No	120 episodes
2000	La Baby-sitter	No	Yes	No	160 episodes
2001	Pedro el escamoso	Yes	Supervising producer	No	325 episodes Co-writer with Luis Felipe Salamanca, Adriana Barreto, Monica Domínguez, Juan Andrés Granados, Perla Ramírez and Rafael Rojas.
2002	Pecados Capitales	Yes	No	No	163 episodes; Co-writer with Luis Felipe Salamanca
2002	Morning Maria	Yes	No	No	119 episodes; Co-writer with Juan Andres Granados and Luis Felipe Salamanca
2003	Sofía dame tiempo	Idea	No	No	130 episodes Idea with Luis Felipe Salamanca
2003	Como Pedro por su casa	Yes	No	No	Co-writer with Luis Felipe Salamanca
2003	Ángel de la Guarda, mi dulce compañía	No	Yes	No	122 episodes
2004	La Saga: Negocio de Familia	Yes	Yes	Yes	186 episodes; Co-directed with Juan Carlos Villamizar; Co-writer with Solanges Acosta, Paola Arias, Paola Cáceres and Christina Hernández
2004-2005	La Séptima Puerta	Yes	No	No	261 episodes; Co-writer with Adriana Barreto, Alexandra Ortiz, Johnny A Ortiz, Gerardo Pinzon and Ruth Viasús
2004-2005	Luna, la heredera	Yes	No	No	120 episodes; Co-writer with María Eugenia Argomedo, Paola Arias, Liliana Bocanegra, Víctor Castillo and Luis Felipe Salamanca
2005	El Pasado no perdona	Idea	No	No	150 episodes; Idea with Luis Felipe Salamanca
2005	El Baile de la vida	Yes	Yes	No	171 episodes; Co-writer with Paola Arias and Paola Cazares
2006	La Ex	Yes	Yes	No	159 episodes; Co-writer with Cesar Bentacur and Luis Felipe Salamanca
2006	Amores Cruzados	Yes	No	No	120 episodes; Co-writer with Susanna Prieto, Perla Ramírez and Luis Felipe Salamanca
2008	La pasión según nuestros días	Yes	No	No	
2009	Bermúdez	Yes	Yes	No	127 episodes;
2010	Secretos de Familia	Yes	No	No	98 episodes; Co-writer with Adriana Barreto, Carlos Fernández de Soto, Ana Fernández Martínez, Perla Ramírez and Claudia Sánchez
2010	El encantador	No	Yes	No	43 episodes
2011	Amar y Temer	Head writer	No	No	88 episodes
2011	La teacher de Ingles	Original idea	No	No	
2013	Prohinido amar	Story	No	No	90 episodes
2017	Polvo Carnavalero	Original story	Yes	No	89 episodes; Based on the film of the same title written by him
2019	Siempre bruja	No	Executive producer	No	18 episodes
2020	Chichipatos: ¡Que Chimba de Navidad!	Yes	Yes	No	TV movie
2020–Present	Chichipatos	Yes	Yes	No	15 episodes

=== Theatre ===
Year	Title	Writer	Producer	Director	Notes
2018	Hombre con hombre, mujer con mujer	No	Yes	No	
2018	¡Callate y escribe!	No	Yes	No	
2018	El concurso	No	Yes	No	
2018	El Puesto	No	Yes	No	
2018	Hay un Complot	Yes	Yes	No	Co-writer with César Bentacur
2019	Guía Sexual para el Fin del Mundo	Yes	Yes	Yes	

== Other works ==
Year	Film	Notes
2006	Dios los junta y ellos se separan	Assistant art director
2011	En Coma	Script consultant
2013	De Rolling por Colombia	Script consultant
2013	El señor de Los cielos	TV series; Executive Vice President of production
2014	De Rolling 2: Por el sueño mundialista	Script consultant
2018	La Mamá del 10	TV series; Executive Vice President of production
