= I Am a Killer: Released =

TV crime documentary series

- Genre: Crime
- Created by: Itamar Klasmer
- Directed by: Itamar Klasmer
- Composers: Tom Howe, Jon Monroe
- Countries of origin: United Kingdom; United States
- Original language: English
- No. of series: 1
- No. of episodes: 3

Production
- Executive producers: Itamar Klasmer, Norah Quartey
- Editor: Antony Oliphant
- Running time: 30-38 minutes
- Production companies: Znak & Co.

Original release
- Release: August 28, 2020

I Am a Killer: Released is a television documentary series that follows Dale Wayne Sigler, a convicted murderer, trying to adjust to a life outside prison.

== Plot summary ==
The series revolves around 53-year old Dale Wayne Sigler; he killed John Zeltner, a Subway employee, in Arlington, Texas in April 1990. He was sentenced to death in 1991, but his death sentence was changed to life three years later because his lawyers argued that he should be retroactively considered under the then-new jury selection rules. Under Texas law, he became eligible for parole after 30 years.

== Cast ==
- Dale Wayne Sigler

== Episodes ==
No.	Title	Directed by	Original release date
1	"30 Years"	Itamar Klasmer	June 28, 2020
Because his sentence is reduced to life, convicted killer Dale Sigler is eligible for parole after 30 years, one of only seven to evade death row.
2	"Walking Free"	Itamar Klasmer	July 5, 2020
Paroled under a one-year house arrest with his pen-pal surrogate mother, Dale struggles to begin a new life - and makes a bombshell of a confession.
3	"A New Motive"	Itamar Klasmer	July 12, 2020
As Dale joins a church and finds a job, his story is met with shock by some and skepticism by others, including the prosecutor who put him in jail.

== Release ==
I Am a Killer: Released was released in the US on 28 August 2020, on Netflix. The dates above refer to the original UK release dates on the Sky network.
