= First and Last (TV series) =

American 2018 reality show on Netflix

- Genre: Reality-TV
- Country of origin: United States
- Original language: English
- No. of seasons: 1
- No. of episodes: 6

Production
- Running time: 38–43 min.

Original release
- Network: Netflix
- Release: September 7, 2018

First and Last is a 2018 American documentarian non-scripted reality television series on Netflix. It is recorded at Gwinnett County Jail, a pre-trial holding facility in Georgia, U.S., with each episode following inmates on their first or last days in jail. The criminal justice system in America is also explored throughout the season.

The full season of First and Last consisting of six episodes was released on September 7, 2018.

== Cast ==
- Shantee G.
- Alex R.
- Velma S.

== Release ==
It was released on September 7, 2018, on Netflix streaming.
