= List of 2020 American television debuts =

These American television shows premiered in 2020.

First aired	Title	Channel	Source
January 1	The Explosion Show	Science Channel	
January 1	Alaska PD	A&E	
January 1	Messiah	Netflix	
January 1	The Circle	Netflix	
January 1	Self-Made Mansions	HGTV	
January 1	100 Day Dream Home	HGTV	
January 2	Deputy	Fox	
January 2	My Feet Are Killing Me	TLC	
January 3	Antiques Roadshow Recut	PBS	
January 3	Elite Youth	FS1	
January 4	Ghost Loop	Travel Channel	
January 4	Hopelessly in Love	Lifetime	
January 4	Say Yes to The Dress: America	TLC	
January 4	Go! Go! Cory Carson	Netflix	
January 6	Pop of the Morning	E!	
January 6	Deathstroke: Knights & Dragons	CW Seed	
January 6	Steve on Watch	Facebook Watch	
January 7	FBI: Most Wanted	CBS	
January 7	Zoey's Extraordinary Playlist	NBC	
January 8	America's Top Dog	A&E	
January 8	True Life Crime	MTV	
January 8	Cheer	Netflix	
January 9	Reclaimed	Discovery Channel	
January 10	Lincoln Rhyme: Hunt for the Bone Collector	NBC	
January 10	AJ and the Queen	Netflix	
January 10	Medical Police	Netflix	
January 10	The Owl House	Disney Channel	
January 10	Bill Burr Presents: The Ringers	Comedy Central	
January 10	How to Survive a Murder	Reelz	
January 13	Meet the Frasers	E!	
January 13	The Healing Powers of Dude	Netflix	
January 14	Kipo and the Age of Wonderbeasts	Netflix	
January 15	Listing Impossible	CNBC	
January 15	68 Whiskey	Paramount Network	
January 15	Faster with Finnegan	Motor Trend	
January 16	Everything's Gonna Be Okay	Freeform	
January 17	Little America	Apple TV+	
January 17	Diary of a Future President	Disney+	
January 18	It's Pony	Nickelodeon	
January 18	Aaron Hernandez's Killing Fields	Reelz	
January 19	9-1-1: Lone Star	Fox	
January 19	Avenue 5	HBO	
January 19	Murdered by Morning	Oxygen	
January 19	Powerbirds	Universal Kids	
January 19	Joseline's Cabaret	Zeus Network	
January 20	Street Outlaws: Fastest in America	Discovery Channel	
January 20	Spy Games	Bravo	
January 20	Bill Hemmer Reporting	Fox News	
January 22	Awkwafina Is Nora from Queens	Comedy Central	
January 22	Story Trek: Trending	BYUtv	
January 23	Star Trek: Picard	CBS All Access	
January 23	Outmatched	Fox	
January 23	October Faction	Netflix	
January 24	The Crystal Maze	Nickelodeon	
January 24	The Goop Lab With Gwyneth Paltrow	Netflix	
January 24	Short Circuit	Disney+	
January 25	Heartland Docs, DVM	Nat Geo Wild	
January 27	Justin Bieber: Seasons	YouTube Premium	
January 31	Ted Bundy: Falling for a Killer	Amazon Video	
February 3	Girl Scout Cookie Championship	Food Network	
February 3	Chopped Sweets	Food Network	
February 3	Below Deck Sailing Yacht	Bravo	
February 3	Twisted Love	Investigation Discovery	
February 4	Unsellable Houses	HGTV	
February 5	Lego Masters	Fox	
February 6	Interrogation	CBS All Access	
February 6	Katy Keene	The CW	
February 6	Indebted	NBC	
February 6	Tommy	CBS	
February 6	Briarpatch	USA Network	
February 7	Locke & Key	Netflix	
February 7	Mythic Quest	Apple TV+	
February 9	Curse of the Bermuda Triangle	Science Channel	
February 9	Shipwreck Secrets	Science Channel	
February 9	Coyote Peterson: Brave the Wild	Animal Planet	
February 9	The Alaska Triangle	Travel Channel	
February 10	NASCAR All In: Battle for Daytona	Motor Trend	
February 11	For Life	ABC	
February 11	Cherish the Day	Oprah Winfrey Network	
February 12	Richard Hammond's BIG	Science Channel	
February 12	Expedition X	Discovery Channel	
February 12	Big Cat Country	Smithsonian Channel	
February 13	On Point	Crackle	
February 14	High Fidelity	Hulu	
February 15	Up and Vanished	Oxygen	
February 16	Duncanville	Fox	
February 16	Slow Burn	Epix	
February 17	The Expanding Universe of Ashley Garcia	Netflix	
February 17	Yoga Friends	Noggin	
February 18	Hot Ones: The Game Show	truTV	
February 20	Save My Skin	TLC	
February 21	Hunters	Amazon Video	
February 21	Glitch Techs	Netflix	
February 21	Gentefied	Netflix	
February 21	Puerta 7	Netflix	
February 21	Babies	Netflix	
February 21	Haunting in the Heartland	Travel Channel	
February 22	ThunderCats Roar	Cartoon Network	
February 22	Nate and Jeremiah: Save My House	HGTV	
February 23	Disney Fam Jam	Disney Channel	
February 26	It's Personal with Amy Hoggart	truTV	
February 26	I Am Not Okay with This	Netflix	
February 28	Shop Class	Disney+	
February 28	Queen Sono	Netflix	
February 29	Tyler Perry's Young Dylan	Nickelodeon	
March 1	Dispatches from Elsewhere	AMC	
March 1	Secrets of the Zoo: Down Under	Nat Geo Wild	
March 2	Breeders	FX	
March 2	In the Room	E!	
March 3	Moonshiners: Master Distiller	Discovery Channel	
March 3	Mike Brewer's World of Cars	Motor Trend	
March 4	Dave	FXX	
March 4	Twenties	BET	
March 4	Fundamental. Gender Justice. No Exceptions	YouTube Premium	
March 4	Tournament of Champions	Food Network	
March 5	Vegas Chef Prizefight	Food Network	
March 5	Flipping 101 w/ Tarek El Moussa	HGTV	
March 5	The Busch Family Brewed	MTV	
March 7	Critter Fixers: Country Vets	Nat Geo Wild	
March 7	Love Goals	Oprah Winfrey Network	
March 8	Rob Riggle: Global Investigator	Discovery Channel	
March 8	Family Karma	Bravo	
March 9	Cosmos: Possible Worlds	National Geographic	
March 11	The Funny Dance Show	E!	
March 12	Waka & Tammy: What the Flocka	WE tv	
March 13	Jessy and Nessy	Amazon Video	
March 15	World of Weapons	Smithsonian Channel	
March 17	Creators for Change	YouTube Premium	
March 18	True Terror with Robert Englund	Travel Channel	
March 18	Motherland: Fort Salem	Freeform	
March 19	All-Round Champion	BYUtv	
March 19	Ruthless	BET+	
March 20	Disney Insider	Disney+	
March 20	Mira, Royal Detective	Disney Jr.	
March 22	House in a Hurry	HGTV	
March 23	The Hidden Kingdoms of China	Nat Geo Wild	
March 23	Life Size	Motor Trend	
March 24	Council of Dads	NBC	
March 25	Eating History	History	
March 27	Making the Cut	Amazon Video	
March 27	Vagrant Queen	Syfy	
March 27	Be Our Chef	Disney+	
March 28	Danger Force	Nickelodeon	
March 28	The Forgotten West Memphis Three	Oxygen	
March 29	Three Busy Debras	Adult Swim	
March 29	Beef House	Adult Swim	
March 30	Almost Paradise	WGN America	
March 30	Driven	Discovery Channel	
March 31	The Secret of Skinwalker Ranch	History	
April 1	Legends of the Wild	Discovery Channel	
April 1	The Iliza Shlesinger Sketch Show	Netflix	
April 2	Broke	CBS	
April 2	Black Files Declassified	Science Channel	
April 3	Home Before Dark	Apple TV+	
April 3	Tales from the Loop	Amazon Video	
April 4	StarBeam	Netflix	
April 5	Kim Kardashian West: The Justice Project	Oxygen	
April 5	Atlanta's Missing and Murdered: The Lost Children	HBO	
April 6	Wayne Brady's Comedy IQ	BYUtv	
April 6	Ollie's Pack	Nickelodeon	
April 6	The Big Show Show	Netflix	
April 6	Daily Essentials	Quibi	
April 7	Tooning Out the News	CBS All Access	
April 8	The Wizard of Paws	BYUtv	
April 9	Shaq Life	TNT	
April 10	Brews Brothers	Netflix	
April 11	Alaska Animal Rescue	Nat Geo Wild	
April 11	Saved by the Barn	Animal Planet	
April 12	Run	HBO	
April 12	ID Breaking Now	Investigation Discovery	
April 13	The Bachelor Presents: Listen to Your Heart	ABC	
April 13	The Baker & the Beauty	ABC	
April 13	Paradise Lost	Spectrum Originals	
April 13	Celebrity IOU	HGTV	
April 14	Deadliest Catch: Bloodline	Discovery Channel	
April 15	MotorTrend: Working from Home	Motor Trend	
April 15	The Innocence Files	Netflix	
April 15	Outer Banks	Netflix	
April 17	Too Hot to Handle	Netflix	
April 17	#blackAF	Netflix	
April 17	Home	Apple TV+	
April 17	Friday Night In with The Morgans	AMC	
April 18	Jungle Animal Rescue	Nat Geo Wild	
April 19	Dragnificent!	TLC	
April 20	90 Day Fiancé: Self-Quarantined	TLC	
April 20	The Midnight Gospel	Netflix	
April 21	Accused: Guilty or Innocent?	A&E	
April 22	The Masked Singer: After the Mask	Fox	
April 23	We're Here	HBO	
April 24	RuPaul's Secret Celebrity Drag Race	VH1	
April 24	Instant Influencer	YouTube Premium	
April 26	Penny Dreadful: City of Angels	Showtime	
April 26	The Killer Truth	HLN	
April 27	Never Have I Ever	Netflix	
May 1	Betty	HBO	
May 1	Remy & Boo	Universal Kids	
May 1	Upload	Amazon Video	
May 1	The Dress Up Gang	TBS	
May 1	Trying	Apple TV+	
May 1	Prop Culture	Disney+	
May 4	Disney Gallery: The Mandalorian	Disney+	
May 4	Camp Getaway	Bravo	
May 5	Tirdy Works	truTV	
May 7	Bruh	BET+	
May 7	Celebrity Watch Party	Fox	
May 7	Robbie	Comedy Central	
May 7	Celebrity Substitute	YouTube Premium	
May 8	Chico Bon Bon: Monkey with a Tool Belt	Netflix	
May 8	Solar Opposites	Hulu	
May 8	Regular Heroes	Amazon Video	
May 10	JJ Villard's Fairy Tales	Adult Swim	
May 10	Find Love Live	TLC	
May 11	Amy Schumer Learns to Cook	Food Network	
May 11	Bakeaway Camp with Martha Stewart	Food Network	
May 11	Asian Americans	PBS	
May 12	Jeff's Homemade Game Show	BYUtv	
May 12	Kingdom of the Mummies	National Geographic	
May 15	The Great	Hulu	
May 15	It's a Dog's Life with Bill Farmer	Disney+	
May 16	Fear Not with Iyanla Vanzant	Oprah Winfrey Network	
May 16	Girlfriends Check In	Oprah Winfrey Network	
May 17	Hightown	Starz	
May 17	Snowpiercer	TNT	
May 17	An American Aristocrat's Guide to Great Estates	Smithsonian Channel	
May 18	Stargirl	DC Universe/The CW	
May 19	Sweet Magnolias	Netflix	
May 20	Married at First Sight: Couples' Cam	Lifetime	
May 20	Sleeping with Friends	YouTube Premium	
May 20	Ultimate Tag	Fox	
May 21	Labor of Love	Fox	
May 21	Impractical Jokers: Dinner Party	truTV	
May 22	All on the Line	Discovery Channel	
May 22	The Big Fib	Disney+	
May 22	Zenimation	Disney+	
May 23	Group Chat	Nickelodeon	
May 24	Kirby Jenner	Quibi	
May 25	Barkskins	National Geographic	
May 25	To Catch a Beautician	VH1	
May 26	The Genetic Detective	ABC	
May 27	Craftopia	HBO Max	
May 27	Legendary	HBO Max	
May 27	Looney Tunes Cartoons	HBO Max	
May 27	Love Life	HBO Max	
May 27	The Not-Too-Late Show with Elmo	HBO Max	
May 27	Game On!	CBS	
May 27	Mysteries of the Deep	Discovery Channel	
May 29	Space Force	Netflix	
May 29	Central Park	Apple TV+	
May 30	BingE! Club	E!	
May 31	Laurel Canyon	Epix	
May 31	Who Killed...	Investigation Discovery	
June 1	Hero Elementary	PBS Kids	
June 1	Royalties	Quibi	
June 2	House Hunters: Comedians on Couches	HGTV	
June 4	The Thomas John Experience	CBS All Access	
June 4	Summer Rush	Food Network	
June 4	All the Way Black	BET+	
June 5	Dear...	Apple TV+	
June 7	I May Destroy You	HBO	
June 7	The 1960s Rediscovered	AXS TV	
June 7	Symon's Dinners Cooking Out	Food Network	
June 8	Big Time Bake	Food Network	
June 8	Buried Worlds with Don Wildman	Travel Channel	
June 8	The Bachelor: The Greatest Seasons - Ever!	ABC	
June 11	Don't	ABC	
June 11	Design at Your Door	HGTV	
June 12	Crossing Swords	Hulu	
June 12	Serial Psyche	Reelz	
June 15	Generation Renovation: Lake House	HGTV	
June 16	Shift Talkers	Motor Trend	
June 17	Prehistoric Road Trip	PBS	
June 17	Love, Victor	Hulu	
June 18	Taste the Nation With Padma Lakshmi	Hulu	
June 18	Syfy Wire's The Great Debate	Syfy	
June 18	Karma	HBO Max	
June 19	Dino Hunters	Discovery Channel	
June 19	Floor Is Lava	Netflix	
June 21	Tournament of Laughs	TBS	
June 21	Lost Cities of the Amazon	Science Channel	
June 21	Perry Mason	HBO	
June 22	B90 Strikes Back!	TLC	
June 23	Celebrity Show-Off	TBS	
June 24	Hot Mess House	HGTV	
June 25	Revenge Prank	MTV	
June 25	Adventure Time: Distant Lands	HBO Max	
June 26	Into the Unknown: Making Frozen II	Disney+	
June 28	I'll Be Gone in the Dark	HBO	
June 28	Giada at Home 2.0	Food Network	
July 2	Warrior Nun	Netflix	
July 5	Unearthed: Seven Wonders	Science Channel	
July 5	Beach Around the World	HGTV	
July 6	Making It Home with Kortney & Dave	HGTV	
July 6	Life-Size Toys	Quibi	
July 7	Dirty Jobs: Rowe'd Trip	Discovery Channel	
July 8	Tough as Nails	CBS	
July 9	Close Enough	HBO Max	
July 9	Flipping Across America	HGTV	
July 9	Cannonball	USA Network	
July 9	Dicktown	FXX	
July 10	Little Voice	Apple TV+	
July 10	Greatness Code	Apple TV+	
July 10	Down to Earth with Zac Efron	Netflix	
July 10	The New York Times Presents	FX	
July 11	Scott's Vacation House Rules	HGTV	
July 11	Hotel Paranormal	Travel Channel	
July 11	Unfiltered	Nickelodeon	
July 12	P-Valley	Starz	
July 13	Celebrity Call Center	E!	
July 15	Brave New World	Peacock	
July 15	Lost Speedways	Peacock	
July 15	Cleopatra in Space	Peacock	
July 15	United We Fall	ABC	
July 15	Super Factories	Science Channel	
July 15	Skin Decision: Before and After	Netflix	
July 17	Cursed	Netflix	
July 17	The Sims Spark'd	TBS	
July 17	Cake My Day	Nickelodeon	
July 20	All-Star Best Thing I Ever Ate	Food Network	
July 20	Die Hart	Quibi	
July 20	The Andy Cohen Diaries	Quibi	
July 20	The ReidOut	MSNBC	
July 22	Build Me Up	HGTV	
July 22	Love on the Spectrum	Netflix	
July 23	Tig N' Seek	HBO Max	
July 23	Lost Resort	TBS	
July 24	Rogue Trip	Disney+	
July 24	The Greatest #AtHome Videos	CBS	
July 26	Helter Skelter: An American Myth	Epix	
July 27	Don't Look Deeper	Quibi	
July 27	Bad Ideas with Adam Devine	Quibi	
July 29	No Limit Chronicles	BET	
July 30	Transformers: War for Cybertron	Netflix	
July 30	Restaurant: Impossible: Back in Business	Food Network	
July 30	The Oprah Conversation	Apple TV+	
July 31	Muppets Now	Disney+	
July 31	Martha Knows Best	HGTV	
August 2	The Osbournes Want to Believe	Travel Channel	
August 2	Connected	Netflix	
August 3	Immigration Nation	Netflix	
August 3	Sex Next Door	Quibi	
August 4	What's It Worth?	A&E	
August 4	Extreme Unboxing	A&E	
August 5	True Life Presents: Quarantine Stories	MTV	
August 5	World's Most Wanted	Netflix	
August 6	Star Trek: Lower Decks	CBS All Access	
August 7	Tiny Creatures	Netflix	
August 9	YOLO: Crystal Fantasy	Adult Swim	
August 10	Mapleworth Murders	Quibi	
August 10	About Face	Quibi	
August 10	10 Things You Don't Know	E!	
August 10	Game On: A Comedy Crossover Event	Netflix	
August 11	Doubling Down with the Derricos	TLC	
August 12	(Un)Well	Netflix	
August 13	Selena + Chef	HBO Max	
August 14	Ted Lasso	Apple TV+	
August 14	Teenage Bounty Hunters	Netflix	
August 16	Darcey & Stacey	TLC	
August 16	Lovecraft Country	HBO	
August 18	I Quit	Discovery Channel	
August 19	Growing Belushi	Discovery Channel	
August 19	Dodgeball Thunderdome	Discovery Channel	
August 19	DeMarcus Family Rules	Netflix	
August 20	The Fungies!	HBO Max	
August 20	Secrets in the Ice	Science Channel	
August 21	Hoops	Netflix	
August 21	RuPaul's Drag Race: Vegas Revue	VH1	
August 21	Backyard Takeover	HGTV	
August 21	100 Days Wild	Discovery Channel	
August 21	Stereoscope	Facebook Watch	
August 23	Expedition to the Edge	Discovery Channel	
August 23	The Vow	HBO	
August 24	Nice One!	Quibi	
August 25	Emily's Wonder Lab	Netflix	
August 26	Million Dollar Beach House	Netflix	
August 27	Ravi Patel's Pursuit of Happiness	HBO Max	
August 30	Love Fraud	Showtime	
September 1	NewsNation	WGN America	
September 2	Tyler Perry's Assisted Living	BET	
September 2	Chef's Table: BBQ	Netflix	
September 3	Raised by Wolves	HBO Max	
September 3	Dr. Pimple Popper: Before the Pop	TLC	
September 4	Away	Netflix	
September 4	Earth to Ned	Disney+	
September 6	Power Book II: Ghost	Starz	
September 7	Elinor Wonders Why	PBS Kids	
September 7	Madagascar: A Little Wild	Hulu/Peacock	
September 9	Woke	Hulu	
September 9	Get Organized with The Home Edit	Netflix	
September 10	Julie and the Phantoms	Netflix	
September 10	Tamar Braxton: Get Ya Life!	WE tv	
September 10	My Feet Are Killing Me: First Steps	TLC	
September 11	Selling the Big Easy	HGTV	
September 12	Help! I Wrecked My House	HGTV	
September 12	James Patterson's Murder Thy Neighbor	Investigation Discovery	
September 13	Judgment with Ashleigh Banfield	Court TV	
September 13	Outrageous Pumpkins	Food Network	
September 13	Wireless	Quibi	
September 14	The Drew Barrymore Show	First-run syndication	
September 14	People (The TV Show!)	First-run syndication	
September 14	Enslaved	Epix	
September 16	Extreme Ice Machines	Science Channel	
September 16	Impossible Fixes	Science Channel	
September 17	Mo Willems and The Storytime All-Stars Present: Don't Let the Pigeon Do Storytime! Shorts!	HBO Max	
September 17	The Bradshaw Bunch	E!	
September 17	Departure	Peacock	
September 18	Wilmore	Peacock	
September 18	Jurassic World Camp Cretaceous	Netflix	
September 18	Ratched	Netflix	
September 18	American Barbecue Showdown	Netflix	
September 18	World's Funniest Animals	The CW	
September 18	Becoming	Disney+	
September 19	Benedict Men	Quibi	
September 21	Like, Share, Dimelo	Fuse	
September 21	Filthy Rich	Fox	
September 21	Defying Gravity: The Untold Story of Women's Gymnastics	YouTube Premium	
September 22	Kal Penn Approves This Message	Freeform	
September 22	Cal Fire	Discovery Channel	
September 23	I Can See Your Voice	Fox	
September 24	Haute Dog	HBO Max	
September 25	A Wilderness of Error	FX	
September 25	Magic of Disney's Animal Kingdom	Disney+	
September 25	Sneakerheads	Netflix	
September 25	Country-Ish	Netflix	
September 25	Utopia	Amazon Video	
September 25	The Amber Ruffin Show	Peacock	
September 26	Magical Girl Friendship Squad	Syfy	
September 26	Wild Life	Syfy	
September 27	Bravo's Chat Room	Bravo	
September 27	Relative Race - After the Finish Line	BYUtv	
September 28	Emergency Call	ABC	
September 30	The News with Shepard Smith	CNBC	
October 1	Released	YouTube Premium	
October 1	CripTales	BBC America	
October 1	A World of Calm	HBO Max	
October 2	Emily in Paris	Netflix	
October 2	Monsterland	Hulu	
October 2	Tiny World	Apple TV+	
October 4	The Comedy Store	Showtime	
October 4	First Ladies	CNN	
October 4	The Walking Dead: World Beyond	AMC	
October 5	Soulmates	AMC	
October 5	Tell Me More with Kelly Corrigan	PBS	
October 5	HEA Strikes Back!	TLC	
October 5	The Expecting	Quibi	
October 6	Next	Fox	
October 6	Song Exploder	Netflix	
October 6	Homestead Rescue: Raney Ranch	Discovery Channel	
October 7	Red Table Talk: The Estefans	Facebook Watch	
October 8	Connecting	NBC	
October 8	Phantom Signals	Science Channel	
October 9	Deaf U	Netflix	
October 9	Santiago of the Seas	Nickelodeon	
October 9	The Right Stuff	Disney+	
October 12	Last Looks	Quibi	
October 13	Survivalists	BYUtv	
October 13	The Cabin with Bert Kreischer	Netflix	
October 13	Struggle Gourmet	Fuse	
October 14	The Con	ABC	
October 15	Social Distance	Netflix	
October 16	Grand Army	Netflix	
October 16	Dream Home Makeover	Netflix	
October 16	Helstrom	Hulu	
October 16	Meet the Chimps	Disney+	
October 18	Halloween Freakshow Cakes	Food Network	
October 18	Seduced: Inside the NXIVM Cult	Starz	
October 19	Big Rad Wolf	Quibi	
October 19	Murder Unboxed	Quibi	
October 22	Unleashed	Nickelodeon	
October 23	How To with John Wilson	HBO	
October 23	Put a Ring on It	Oprah Winfrey Network	
October 23	Kid Correspondent	YouTube Premium	
October 25	I Love a Mama's Boy	TLC	
October 27	Blood of Zeus	Netflix	
October 29	That Animal Rescue Show	CBS All Access	
October 29	Top Secret Videos	truTV	
October 30	My Big Italian Adventure	HGTV	
October 31	NASCAR 2020: Under Pressure	Motor Trend	
October 31	Secrets of the Zoo: North Carolina	Nat Geo Wild	
November 5	B Positive	CBS	
November 5	A Closer Look	UMC	
November 7	Behind Every Man	Oprah Winfrey Network	
November 7	Pikwik Pack	Disney Jr.	
November 7	My Little Pony: Pony Life	Discovery Family	
November 7	Side Hustle	Nickelodeon	
November 8	Moonbase 8	Showtime	
November 8	The Real Murders of Orange County	Oxygen	
November 8	By Whatever Means Necessary: The Times of Godfather of Harlem	Epix	
November 9	The Mighty Ones	Hulu/Peacock	
November 10	The Cost of Winning	HBO	
November 10	Dash & Lily	Netflix	
November 10	Trash Truck	Netflix	
November 11	The Liberator	Netflix	
November 11	Aunty Donna's Big Ol' House of Fun	Netflix	
November 11	Trial 4	Netflix	
November 11	Eater's Guide To The World	Hulu	
November 11	The Real Housewives of Salt Lake City	Bravo	
November 11	Lost Relics of the Knights Templar	Discovery Channel	
November 12	Full Bloom	HBO Max	
November 12	My Sesame Street Friends	HBO Max	
November 13	Becoming You	Apple TV+	
November 13	Doug Unplugs	Apple TV+	
November 13	The Astronauts	Nickelodeon	
November 13	Inside Pixar	Disney+	
November 14	History's Greatest Mysteries	History	
November 14	Lovely Bites	Oprah Winfrey Network	
November 14	Tregaye's Way	Oprah Winfrey Network	
November 14	Food Fantasies	Oprah Winfrey Network	
November 14	Tanya's Kitchen Table	Oprah Winfrey Network	
November 15	Candy Land	Food Network	
November 17	Big Sky	ABC	
November 17	We Are the Champions	Netflix	
November 18	Holiday Home Makeover with Mr. Christmas	Netflix	
November 18	Resist	YouTube Premium	
November 19	Breaking Beauty	Crackle	
November 19	Trolls: TrollsTopia	Hulu/Peacock	
November 19	For the Love of Jason	UMC	
November 20	Marvel's 616	Disney+	
November 20	The Pack	Amazon Video	
November 20	Voices of Fire	Netflix	
November 22	Buddy vs. Christmas	Food Network	
November 26	Texas 6	CBS All Access	
November 26	12 Dates of Christmas	HBO Max	
November 26	The Flight Attendant	HBO Max	
November 27	Biggest Little Christmas Showdown	HGTV	
November 27	The Movie Show	Syfy	
December 1	The Holiday Movies That Made Us	Netflix	
December 1	The Great Gift Exchange	YouTube Premium	
December 2	Trafficked with Mariana van Zeller	National Geographic	
December 2	Rescue Cam	A&E	
December 3	Stylish with Jenna Lyons	HBO Max	
December 3	Rocket Around the Xmas Tree	Discovery Channel	
December 3	Conspiracies Decoded	Science Channel	
December 4	Earth At Night In Color	Apple TV+	
December 4	Stillwater	Apple TV+	
December 4	Selena: The Series	Netflix	
December 9	The Surgeon's Cut	Netflix	
December 10	House of Ho	HBO Max	
December 11	Baby Shark's Big Show!	Nickelodeon	
December 11	The Wilds	Amazon Video	
December 12	The Cross Connection With Tiffany Cross	MSNBC	
December 13	The Sunday Show with Jonathan Capehart	MSNBC	
December 14	Deliciousness	MTV	
December 14	Tiny Pretty Things	Netflix	
December 16	How to Ruin Christmas: The Wedding	Netflix	
December 16	Pikes Peak: On the Edge	Motor Trend	
December 18	On Pointe	Disney+	
December 25	Bridgerton	Netflix	
December 27	The Masked Dancer	Fox	
December 28	Atlanta Justice	Investigation Discovery	
December 29	Streets of Dreams with Marcus Lemonis	CNBC	
December 30	Best Leftovers Ever!	Netflix	
2020	The CW Happy Hour	The CW	

== Miniseries ==
First aired	Title	Channel	Source
January 2	Sex, Explained	Netflix	
January 12	The Outsider	HBO	
February 3	McMillions	HBO	
February 14	Visible: Out on Television	Apple TV+	
February 16	Washington	History	
February 28	DC Universe All Star Games	DC Universe	
March 5	Devs	Hulu	
March 6	Hillary	Hulu	
March 16	The Plot Against America	HBO	
March 18	Little Fires Everywhere	Hulu	
March 20	Self Made	Netflix	
March 20	The English Game	Netflix	
March 20	Tiger King	Netflix	
March 26	Unorthodox	Netflix	
April 15	Mrs. America	Hulu	
April 19	The Last Dance	ESPN	
April 24	Defending Jacob	Apple TV+	
April 26	Coronavirus, Explained	Netflix	
May 1	Hollywood	Netflix	
May 8	The Eddy	Netflix	
May 10	I Know This Much Is True	HBO	
May 25	Grant	History	
May 27	Jeffrey Epstein: Filthy Rich	Netflix	
June 11	Ghost Adventures: Quarantine	Travel Channel	
June 25	Adventure Time: Distant Lands	HBO Max	
July 5	Outcry	Showtime	
July 9	Expecting Amy	HBO Max	
July 14	The Business of Drugs	Netflix	
July 20	American Greed: Biggest Cons	CNBC	
July 22	Fear City: New York vs the Mafia	Netflix	
July 31	The Last Narc	Amazon Video	
August 7	Wizards: Tales of Arcadia	Netflix	
August 9	Surviving Jeffrey Epstein	Lifetime	
August 22	Love in the Time of Corona	Freeform	
September 1	16 and Recovering	MTV	
September 2	The Witcher: A Look Inside the Episodes	Netflix	
September 14	The Third Day	HBO	
September 14	We Are Who We Are	HBO	
September 16	Challenger: The Final Flight	Netflix	
September 27	Joe Exotic: Tigers, Lies and Cover-Up	Investigation Discovery	
September 27	The Comey Rule	Showtime	
September 28	Whose Vote Counts, Explained	Netflix	
October 4	The Good Lord Bird	Showtime	
October 9	The Haunting of Bly Manor	Netflix	
October 22	Equal	HBO Max	
October 23	The Queen's Gambit	Netflix	
October 25	The Undoing	HBO	
October 29	City So Real	National Geographic	
November 1	Dying To Be Famous: The Ryan Singleton Mystery	Bounce TV	
November 1	Killer in Question	Investigation Discovery	
November 10	A Teacher	Hulu	
November 15	The Reagans	Showtime	
November 15	Murder on Middle Beach	HBO	
November 25	Terror Lake Drive	UMC	
November 29	Empires of New York	CNBC	
December 16	30 Days With: Hanaodengan	YouTube Premium	
December 16	30 Days With: Ryan Garcia	YouTube Premium	
December 3	Heaven's Gate: The Cult of Cults	HBO Max	
December 6	Your Honor	Showtime	
December 9	30 Days With: Why Don't We	YouTube Premium	
December 16	Pikes Peak: On the Edge	Motor Trend	
December 17	The Stand	CBS All Access	
