= 3rd Critics Choice Real TV Awards =

2021 American television awards

3rd Critics' Choice Real TV Awards
- Date: June 21, 2021
- Country: United States
- Presented by: Broadcast Television Journalists Association and NPACT
- Website: www.criticschoice.com/critics-choice-real-tv-awards/

The 3rd Critics' Choice Real TV Awards, presented by the Broadcast Television Journalists Association and NPACT, which recognizes excellence in nonfiction, unscripted and reality programming across broadcast, cable and streaming platforms, were held on June 21, 2021. The nominations were announced on June 2, 2021.

== Winners and nominees ==
Winners are listed first and highlighted in bold:

=== Programs ===
| Best Competition Series | Best Competition Series: Talent/Variety |
|---|---|
| **The Great British Baking Show (Netflix) (tie)**; **RuPaul's Drag Race (VH1) (tie)**; The Amazing Race (CBS); Top Chef (Bravo); Tough as Nails (CBS) | **The Masked Singer (Fox) (tie)**; **The Voice (NBC) (tie)**; American Idol (ABC); Legendary (HBO Max); World of Dance (NBC) |
| Best Unstructured Series | Best Structured Series |
| **Deaf U (Netflix)**; Crikey! It's the Irwins (Discovery+); Lenox Hill (Netflix); The Real World Homecoming: New York (Paramount+); RuPaul's Drag Race: Untucked (VH1) | **Diners, Drive-Ins and Dives (Food Network) (tie)**; **The Oprah Conversation (Apple TV+) (tie)**; A World of Calm (HBO Max); History of Swear Words (Netflix); Queer Eye (Netflix) |
| Best Business Show | Sports Show |
| **Shark Tank (ABC)**; Restaurant: Impossible (Food Network); Streets of Dreams with Marcus Lemonis (CNBC); Undercover Billionaire (Discovery Channel); Wahl Street (HBO Max) | **30 for 30 (ESPN)**; Defying Gravity (YouTube Originals); Last Chance U: Basketball (Netflix); Peyton's Places (ESPN+); Real Sports with Bryant Gumbel (HBO) |
| Best Crime/Justice Series | Best Ongoing Documentary Series |
| **I'll Be Gone in the Dark (HBO)**; Murder Among the Mormons (Netflix); Murder on Middle Beach (HBO); The Ripper (Netflix); The Vow (HBO); Trafficked with Mariana van Zeller (National Geographic) | **Frontline (PBS)**; American Masters (PBS); Dear... (Apple TV+); POV (PBS); The Circus: Inside the Greatest Political Show on Earth (Showtime); The Vow (HBO) |
| Best Limited Documentary Series | Best Short Form Series |
| **1971: The Year That Music Changed Everything (Apple TV+)**; Amend: The Fight for America (Netflix); I'll Be Gone in the Dark (HBO); Love Fraud (Showtime); Murder on Middle Beach (HBO); Secrets of the Whales (Disney+/National Geographic) | **Issa Rae Teaches Creating Outside the Lines (MasterClass)**; First Person (Snapchat); Lady Parts (ellentube); OWN Your Vote (NowThis/OWN); Ready Jet Cook (Food Network Kitchen) |
| Culinary Show | Game Show |
| **Taste the Nation with Padma Lakshmi (Hulu)**; Amy Schumer Learns to Cook (Food Network); Magnolia Table with Joanna Gaines (Discovery+); Nailed It! (Netflix); Top Chef (Bravo) | **Jeopardy! (CBS Television/Syndicated)**; 25 Words or Less (Fox/Syndicated); Supermarket Sweep (ABC); Weakest Link (NBC); Who Wants to Be a Millionaire (ABC) |
| Best Travel/Adventure Series | Best Animal/Nature Show |
| **Stanley Tucci: Searching for Italy (CNN)**; Men in Kilts: A Roadtrip with Sam and Graham (Starz); Running Wild with Bear Grylls (National Geographic); Somebody Feed Phil (Netflix); The Great Food Truck Race (Food Network) | **Life in Colour with David Attenborough (Netflix)**; The Incredible Dr. Pol (Nat Geo Wild); Secrets of the Whales (Disney+/National Geographic); That Animal Rescue Show (Paramount+); Wizard of Paws (BYU TV) |
| Best Lifestyle: Fashion/Beauty Show | Best Relationship Show |
| **Queer Eye (Netflix)**; Haute Dog (HBO Max); Shine True (Fuse); Skin Decision: Before and After (Netflix); Stylish with Jenna Lyons (HBO Max) | **Love on the Spectrum (Netflix)**; 90 Day Fiancé (TLC); Couples Therapy (Showtime); Indian Matchmaking (Netflix); My Love: Six Stories of True Love (Netflix) |
| Best Live Show | Best Lifestyle: Home/Garden Show |
| **Dancing with the Stars (ABC)** | **House Hunters International (HGTV)**; Martha Knows Best (HGTV); Property Brothers: Forever Home (HGTV); Rock the Block (HGTV); Selling Sunset (Netflix) |

=== Personality ===
| Ensemble Cast in an Unscripted Series | Show Host |
|---|---|
| **RuPaul's Drag Race (VH1)**; Crikey! It's the Irwins (Discovery+); Queer Eye (Netflix); The Real World Homecoming: New York (Paramount+); Top Chef (Bravo) | **John Oliver on Last Week Tonight with John Oliver (HBO)**; Oprah Winfrey on The Oprah Conversation (Apple TV+); Padma Lakshmi on Taste the Nation with Padma Lakshmi (Hulu); RuPaul on RuPaul's Drag Race (VH1); Stanley Tucci on Stanley Tucci: Searching for Italy (CNN) |
| Female Star of the Year | Male Star of the Year |
| **Sandra Lee on Dr. Pimple Popper (TLC)**; Nicole Byer on Nailed It! (Netflix); Michelle Visage on RuPaul's Drag Race (VH1); Padma Lakshmi on Taste the Nation with Padma Lakshmi (Hulu); Samantha Bee on Full Frontal with Samantha Bee (TBS) | **Phil Rosenthal on Somebody Feed Phil (Netflix)**; Guy Fieri on Diners, Drive-Ins and Dives (Food Network); RuPaul on RuPaul's Drag Race (VH1); Stanley Tucci on Stanley Tucci: Searching for Italy (CNN); Trevor Noah on The Daily Show with Trevor Noah (Comedy Central) |

=== Achievement ===
| Outstanding Achievement in Nonfiction Programming by a Network or Streaming Platform | Outstanding Achievement in Nonfiction Production |
|---|---|
| **HBO Max**; Discovery+; Disney+; Hulu; National Geographic; Netflix | **Sharp Entertainment**; The Intellectual Property Corporation; Jigsaw Productions; Renegade 83 |
Critics' Choice Real TV Impact Award
**Alex Trebek**

=== Most major nominations ===
Programs that received multiple nominations are listed below, by number of nominations per work and per network:

Shows that received multiple nominations
| Nominations | Show | Network |
|---|---|---|
| 5 | RuPaul's Drag Race | VH1 |
| 3 | Queer Eye | Netflix |
| 3 | Stanley Tucci: Searching for Italy | CNN |
| 3 | Taste the Nation with Padma Lakshmi | Hulu |
| 3 | Top Chef | Bravo |
| 2 | Crikey! It's the Irwins | Discovery+ |
| 2 | Diners, Drive-Ins and Dives | Food Network |
| 2 | I'll Be Gone in the Dark | HBO |
| 2 | Murder on Middle Beach | HBO |
| 2 | Nailed It! | Netflix |
| 2 | The Oprah Conversation | Apple TV+ |
| 2 | The Real World Homecoming: New York | Paramount+ |
| 2 | Secrets of the Whales | Disney+/National Geographic |
| 2 | Somebody Feed Phil | Netflix |
| 2 | The Vow | HBO |

Nominations by network
| Nominations | Network |
|---|---|
| 22 | Netflix |
| 8 | HBO |
| 6 | HBO Max |
| 6 | VH1 |
| 5 | ABC |
| 5 | Food Network |
| 5 | National Geographic |
| 4 | Apple TV+ |
| 4 | Discovery+ |
| 4 | HGTV |
| 4 | Hulu |
| 3 | Bravo |
| 3 | CBS |
| 3 | CNN |
| 3 | Disney+ |
| 3 | NBC |
| 3 | Paramount+ |
| 3 | PBS |
| 3 | Showtime |
| 2 | Fox |
| 2 | TLC |

=== Most major wins ===
Shows that received multiple awards
| Wins | Show | Network |
|---|---|---|
| 2 | RuPaul's Drag Race | VH1 |

Wins by network
| Wins | Network |
|---|---|
| 6 | Netflix |
| 2 | ABC |
| 2 | Apple TV+ |
| 2 | HBO |
| 2 | VH1 |
