= Charles T. Meide =

American underwater archaeologist

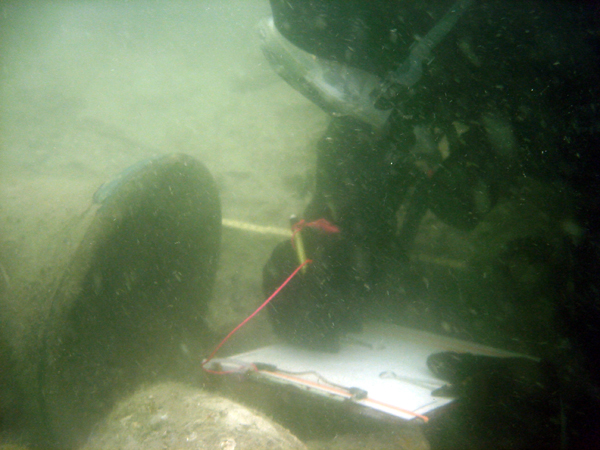
Meide recording the ship's bell discovered on the 18th century "Storm Wreck."

Charles T. Meide Jr., known as Chuck Meide, (born March 23, 1971) is an underwater and maritime archaeologist and currently the Director of LAMP (Lighthouse Archaeological Maritime Program), the research arm of the St. Augustine Lighthouse & Maritime Museum located in St. Augustine, Florida. Meide, of Syrian descent on his father's side, was born in Jacksonville, Florida, and raised in the adjacent coastal town of Atlantic Beach. He earned BA and MA degrees in Anthropology with a focus in underwater archaeology in 1993 and 2001 from Florida State University, where he studied under George R. Fischer, and undertook Ph.D. studies in Historical Archaeology at the College of William and Mary starting the following year.

Meide has participated in a wide array of shipwreck and maritime archaeological projects across the U.S., especially in Florida, and throughout the Caribbean and Bermuda and in Australia and Ireland. From 1995 to 1997 he participated in the search for, discovery, and total excavation of La Salle's shipwreck, La Belle, lost in 1686. From December 1997 to January 1998 he served as Co-Director (with David Johnson) of the Kingstown Harbour Shipwreck Project, an investigation sponsored by the Institute of Maritime History and Florida State University into the wreck of the French frigate Junon (1778) lost in 1780 in St. Vincent and the Grenadines. In 1999 he directed the Dog Island Shipwreck Survey, a comprehensive maritime survey of the waters around a barrier island off the coast of Franklin County, Florida, and between 2004 and 2006 he directed the Achill Island Maritime Archaeology Project off the coast of County Mayo, Ireland.

Since taking over as Director of LAMP in 2006, he has directed the First Coast Maritime Archaeology Project, a state-funded research and educational program focusing on shipwrecks and other maritime archaeological resources in the offshore and inland waters of Northeast Florida. In 2009, during this project, Meide discovered the "Storm Wreck," a ship from the final fleet to evacuate British troops and Loyalist refugees from Charleston at the end of the Revolutionary War, which wrecked trying to enter St. Augustine Inlet in late December 1782. He led the archaeological excavation of this shipwreck site each summer from 2010 through 2015, overseeing the recovery of thousands of well-preserved artifacts. These include cannons, flintlock pistols and muskets, and the ship's bell, along with a wide range of household items and personal possessions such as cookware and tableware, coins, buttons, buckles, locks and keys, a false watch or faux montrasse, and an ivory lice comb.

On July 10, 2014, the St. Augustine Lighthouse & Museum announced at a press conference that Meide would lead an expedition to search for the lost French fleet of Jean Ribault, wrecked in 1565. The search area was located in Canaveral National Seashore waters, and was carried out in partnership with the National Park Service, the State of Florida, NOAA's Office of Ocean Exploration, the Center for Historical Archaeology, and the Institute of Maritime History. When one of Ribault's ships was discovered by a treasure hunter, Meide along with a small team of scholars worked closely with a lawyer for the Republic of France, providing historical evidence leading to a federal court ruling that the vessel remains the property of the French government.

From 2016 to 2019, Meide directed the excavation of the "Anniversary Wreck," another 18th-century shipwreck with a well-preserved assemblage of artifacts, believed to represent a merchant vessel lost while trying to enter St. Augustine. This vessel had a cargo of cauldrons, clothing irons, shoe buckles, and other domestic and hardware items, and included preserved organic remnants such as insect and rodent remains and peach and olive pits.

From 2021 to 2024 Meide has directed the first underwater excavations at the 1752-1763 site of Fort Mose, the first free African American settlement in the United States, established by Spanish authorities and escaped slaves from British colonies who made it to Spanish Florida. This research, which has explored the original waterfront of the fort and also portions of the fort that have eroded into an adjacent creek, has been carried out in conjunction with the terrestrial excavations of the fort by Flagler College, the University of Florida, and the University of Texas at Austin, comprising a rare example of underwater and terrestrial archaeologists working together at a historical site simultaneously, using the same methodologies and systems whenever possible.

Since 2020, Meide has periodically served as adjunct faculty at Flagler College, teaching several classes in Maritime Archaeology. Meide has also served on the board of the Institute of Maritime History from 2005 to 2022, as vice president from 2009 to 2022, and currently supports IMH in an advisory role. He is the co-founder of the Cannon Finders Club (established in 1996 in Cincinnati, Ohio). Meide has been featured in many documentary films, including episodes of PBS's Secrets of the Dead and Nova, Science Channel's Shipwreck Secrets, and National Geographic Channel's Drain the Oceans.

Meide has authored over 50 research papers, reports, theses, book chapters, and journal articles.

== See also ==
- Lighthouse Archaeological Maritime Program (LAMP)
