= Explained (TV series) =

American documentary television series

- Genre: Documentary
- Created by: Ezra Klein; Joe Posner
- Theme music composer: Jackson Greenberg
- Opening theme: "Explained Theme Song"
- No. of seasons: 3
- No. of episodes: 44

Production
- Executive producers: Ezra Klein; Kara Rozansky; Claire Gordon; Chad Mumm; Lisa Nishimura; Joe Posner; Jason Spingarn-Koff; Kate Townsend
- Cinematography: Cory Popp; Doug Camberis; Mario Furloni; Andrew Berends
- Running time: 14–26 minutes
- Production company: Vox

Original release
- Network: Netflix
- Release: May 23, 2018 – October 15, 2021

Related
- The Mind, Explained; Sex, Explained; Coronavirus, Explained; Whose Vote Counts, Explained; Money, Explained

Explained is an American documentary television series on the streaming service Netflix. The show is produced by Vox Media and is based on Vox's previous YouTube video series which followed a similar format. The show's episodes averaged between 16 and 24 minutes, with each focusing on a different topic. Each episode is voiced by a different guest narrator. The series premiered on Netflix on May 23, 2018 with episodes released on a weekly basis. The second season premiered on September 26, 2019 and the third season on July 16, 2021.

The show has also spawned five spin-off series. On September 12, 2019, Netflix released the first season of The Mind, Explained, a series focused specifically on topics related to the human brain. On January 4, 2020, a follow-up titled Sex, Explained was released, with episodes centered around the theme of sex. On April 26, 2020, the 3-episode miniseries Coronavirus, Explained was released, which focuses on the COVID-19 pandemic. On September 28, 2020, the 3-episode miniseries, Whose Vote Counts, Explained was released, which details this history and current context of voting in the United States. Money, Explained, a 5-episode miniseries released on May 11, 2021, focused on financial scams, credit cards, student loans, retirement and gambling. On November 9, 2021, a second season of The Mind, Explained was released.

== Episodes ==
=== Series overview ===
Season	Episodes	Originally released	
Season	Episodes	First released	Last released
1	20	May 23, 2018	September 19, 2018
2	10	September 26, 2019	November 28, 2019
3	14	July 16, 2021	October 15, 2021

=== Season 1 (2018) ===
No. overall	No. in season	Title	Narrator	Original release date
1	1	"The Racial Wealth Gap"	Samira Wiley	May 23, 2018
A look at the wealth gap among races in the US and its causes, including slavery and racial segregation. Featuring Senator Cory Booker, Mehrsa Baradaran, and Thomas Shapiro. Appearances by TV host George Stephanopoulos, journalist Brian Williams, and Middle-Eastern American business expert Pierre Subeh.
2	2	"Designer DNA"	Joss Fong	May 23, 2018
Scientists and experts discuss the risks and benefits, as well as potential consequences of, gene editing. Featuring Jennifer Doudna and Rebecca Cokley.
3	3	"Monogamy"	Maria Bello	May 23, 2018
A historical and biological examination of monogamy, with a look at modern couples, cultural expectations, and the habits of other species, including bonobos. Featuring Dan Savage, Stephanie Coontz, Christopher Ryan, and David P. Barash.
4	4	"K-Pop"	Estelle Caswell	May 30, 2018
Discussions with musicians, fans, and music theorists about the expanding global fascination with K-pop. Featuring Epik High and Primary.
5	5	"Cryptocurrency"	Christian Slater	June 6, 2018
Breaking down the growth and popularity of cryptocurrency, and its potential future value.
6	6	"Why Diets Fail"	Maria Bello	June 13, 2018
An overview of various high-profile diets, and discussions about why many are unsuccessful long-term. Featuring Marion Nestle.
7	7	"The Stock Market"	Estelle Caswell	June 20, 2018
A look into the connection between the stock market and a country's economy. Featuring Lynn A. Stout, Robert J. Shiller and Milton Friedman (archive footage).
8	8	"eSports"	Estelle Caswell	June 27, 2018
An explanation of the rise of competitive video gaming, also known as eSports. Featuring Dennis Fong and Greg Street.
9	9	"Extraterrestrial Life"	LeVar Burton	July 4, 2018
The debate of extraterrestrial life, including its possible existence, conspiracy theories, UFOs, and its place in pop-culture. Featuring Seth Shostak, Sara Seager, Paul Davies, and Jill Tarter.
10	10	"!"	Nick Kroll	July 11, 2018
A history of punctuation with specific emphasis on the exclamation mark (!), and its changing usage over time. Featuring Geoffrey Nunberg, Jason Parham, and Deborah Tannen.
11	11	"Cricket"	Aasif Mandvi	July 18, 2018
A look at the history of the popular sport cricket. Featuring Stephen Fry, Jarrod Kimber, Brian Lara, Mihir Bose, and Stuart Robertson.
12	12	"Weed"	Kevin Smith	July 25, 2018
Scientists and industry experts discuss the history of cannabis plants, the various usage of hemp, and the growing trend of popular products containing CBD extract. Featuring Michael Pollan, Tommy Chong, Carl Hart, Kyle Kushman, and Mark A. R. Kleiman.
13	13	"Tattoo"	Coleman Lowndes	August 1, 2018
An exploration of the history of tattoos, including tribal rituals and traditions in various cultures around the world, and their use as status symbols. Featuring Lars Krutak and Horiyoshi III.
14	14	"Astrology"	Yara Shahidi	August 8, 2018
A look at the history and accuracy of astrology, as well as the science behind why people hold it in high regard.
15	15	"Can We Live Forever?"	Kristen Bell	August 15, 2018
Scientists and researchers discuss the possibility of extending human life expectancy, including looks at the study of ageing. Featuring Ezekiel Emanuel, Nir Barzilai, Laura Deming, Kwame Anthony Appiah, and Cynthia Kenyon.
16	16	"The Female Orgasm"	Rachel Bloom	August 22, 2018
Discussions about the science and history behind the female orgasm, and ways modern women approach the subject. Featuring Lisa M. Diamond, Mireille Miller-Young, Beverly Whipple, and Paula England.
17	17	"Political Correctness"	Jerry Springer	August 29, 2018
A look at the debate surrounding political correctness, including talks of free speech, hate speech, and inclusivity, and how "PC-culture" has influenced politics. Featuring W. Kamau Bell, Julia Serano, Glenn Beck, and John L. Jackson Jr.
18	18	"Why Women Are Paid Less"	Rachel McAdams	September 5, 2018
Discussions on the gender pay gap and the rights of women in the workplace. Featuring Valentine Rugwabiza, Hillary Clinton, Greta Van Susteren, Katrín Jakobsdóttir, and Anne-Marie Slaughter.
19	19	"The World's Water Crisis"	Kyle MacLachlan	September 12, 2018
An examination of the water crisis around the world, including ideas on how to protect clean water and ensuring third-world countries continue to have access. Featuring Amina Mohamed.
20	20	"Music"	Carly Rae Jepsen	September 19, 2018
A brief history of music, and a discussion on the definitions of music and rhythm. Featuring Tokimonsta.

=== Season 2 (2019) ===
No. overall	No. in season	Title	Narrator	Original release date
21	1	"Cults"	Lakeith Stanfield	September 26, 2019
A look at the history of Cults, including how they attract and manipulate people, and how online advancements have helped them spread. Featuring Catherine Oxenberg, Janja Lalich, Reza Aslan, and Mitch Horowitz.
22	2	"Billionaires"	Maggie Siff	October 3, 2019
An explanation of wealth accumulation and the growing number of billionaires around the world. Featuring Mark Cuban, Bernie Sanders, Jeffrey Sachs, Yasheng Huang, Abigail Disney, Brooke Harrington, and Dolly Lenz.
23	3	"Animal Intelligence"	Hilary Swank	October 10, 2019
A look into the ways in which humans measure the intelligence of animals. Featuring Frans de Waal, Laurie R. Santos, and Peter Godfrey-Smith.
24	4	"Athleisure"	Aya Cash	October 17, 2019
An examination of athleisure, the activewear fashion. Featuring Kate Hudson, Chip Wilson, Valerie Steele, and Robin Givhan.
25	5	"Coding"	Karlie Kloss	October 24, 2019
A history of the evolution of computer coding, and predictions for how coding can shape the future. Featuring Zeynep Tufekci, Alan Kay, Tim Wu, Andries van Dam, Garry Tan, and Karen Sandler.
26	6	"Pirates"	Natasha Lyonne	October 31, 2019
A look into the history of pirates and why their image in pop culture clashes with their actual histories. Featuring Lauren Benton and Peter Leeson.
27	7	"The Next Pandemic"	J. K. Simmons	November 7, 2019
A discussion of pandemics and how they spread. Featuring Bill Gates, Maryn McKenna, and Allan S. Detsky.
28	8	"The Future of Meat"	Vincent Kartheiser	November 14, 2019
An explanation of the unsustainability of meat, and the rising popularity of plant-based meats. Featuring Paul Rozin, Melanie Joy, Michael Specter, and Josh Tetrick.
29	9	"Beauty"	John Waters	November 21, 2019
A wide-ranging look at beauty, including how humans define it and why art and nature can be aesthetically pleasing. Featuring Anjan Chatterjee and Richard Prum.
30	10	"Diamonds"	Cleo Abram	November 28, 2019
A brief history of diamonds, including trade, their symbol, and their value. Featuring Sonia Marciano, William Spriggs, and Jacob Arabo.

=== Season 3 (2021) ===
No. overall	No. in season	Title	Narrator	Original release date
31	1	"Sugar"	Keri Russell	July 16, 2021
Shows the history of sugar and others synthetic sweeteners like saccharin, aspartame and sucralose. Debates the health question around sugar, showing myths and facts about its consumption.
32	2	"Royalty"	Rosario Dawson	July 23, 2021
Discusses how monarchies around the world keep surviving after centuries, even with the world changing around them.
33	3	"Flags"	Samira Wiley	July 30, 2021
Explores how a piece of cloth transformed into a powerful symbol of both love and hate, freedom and oppression.
34	4	"Dogs"	Jake Gyllenhaal	August 6, 2021
Why are dogs man's best friend? This episode focuses on the science behind the mind, and the heart, of our pet friends.
35	5	"The End of Oil"	Ethan Hawke	August 13, 2021
As our world becomes increasingly centred around renewable energy, this episode observes the end of an era for what has been our primary source of fuel for over a century.
36	6	"Chess"	Rainn Wilson	August 20, 2021
A brief look into the history behind this famous sport, its mental benefits and the global competition surrounding it.
37	7	"Your Skin"	Sophie Okonedo	August 27, 2021
38	8	"Apologies"	Keke Palmer	September 3, 2021
39	9	"Hurricanes"	Héctor Elizondo	September 10, 2021
40	10	"Plastic Surgery"	Kim Cattrall	September 17, 2021
Discusses the original intentions of plastic surgery, how it is now used in the cosmetics industry and the differing views surrounding this controversial subject matter.
41	11	"Dance Crazes"	Kelly Rowland	September 24, 2021
Dives into the most popular dance trends, how a dance becomes popular and the legal matters in question concerning copyright with TikTok as an example.
42	12	"Time"	Joseph Gordon-Levitt	October 1, 2021
43	13	"Country Music"	Connie Britton	October 8, 2021
44	14	"Fairy Tales"	Ruth Negga	October 15, 2021
Shows that the most well-known fairytales have had a global presence and numerous variations, while putting into question whether the Walt Disney Company has assisted in or disparaged this cultural diversity.

== Reception ==
The first season of Explained received generally positive reviews from critics. Kahron Spearman of The Daily Dot praised the show's use of "experts, easy-to-understand charting, and linear storytelling". In his review for IndieWire, Steve Greene wrote that the show "manages to avoid patronizing that unpredictable audience, presenting historical timelines and abstract concepts in a way that viewers can choose to digest however they wish".
