= Jackson Greenberg =

American film and television composer

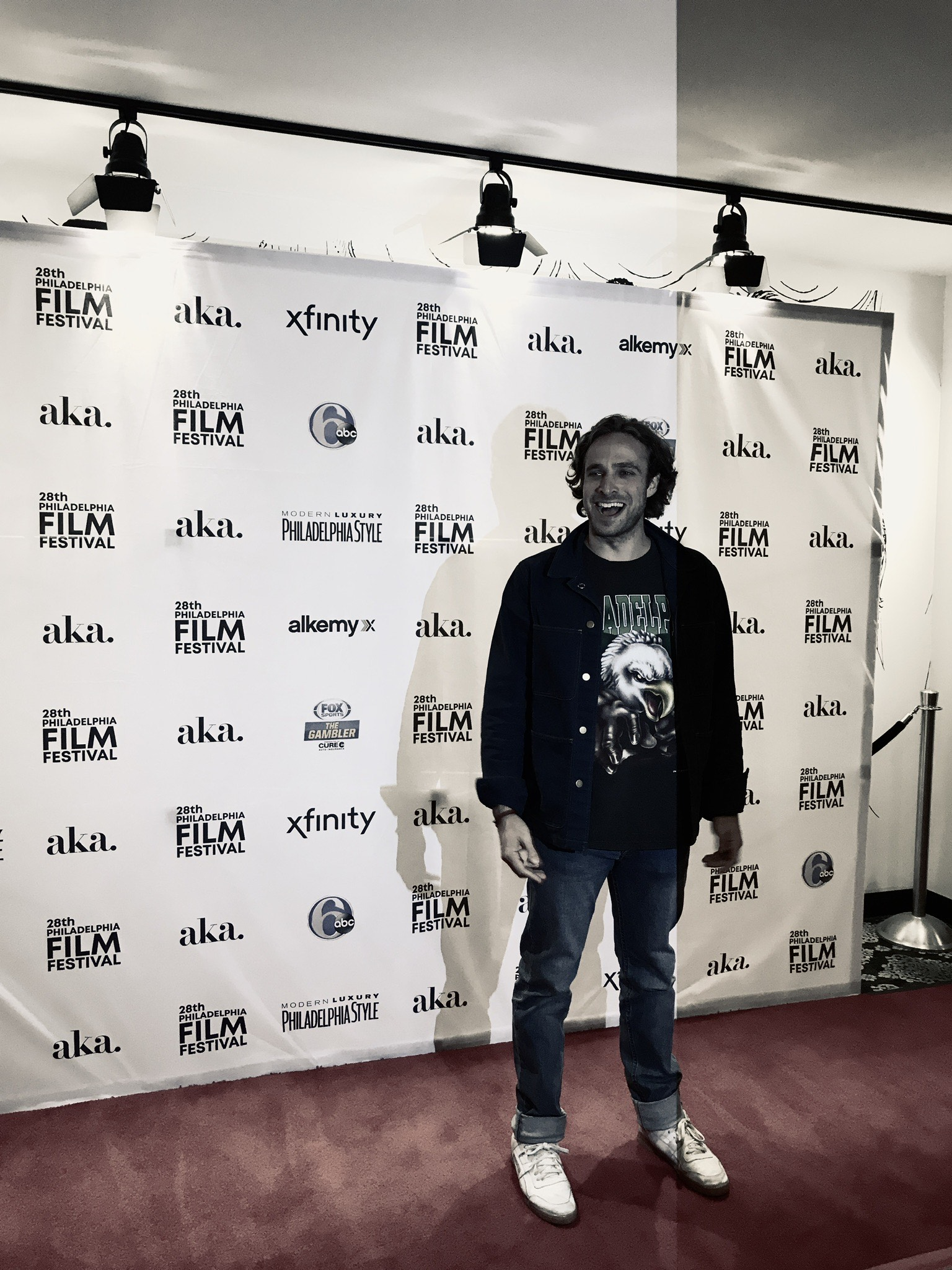
- Born: Philadelphia, Pennsylvania, U.S.
- Occupation: Composer
- Years active: 2011–present

Jackson Greenberg is an American film and television composer based in Los Angeles. He is best known for scoring Audible, DMX: Don't Try to Understand, Maybe This Year, Cartel Land and for writing the theme song to the Netflix series Explained.

== Life and career ==
Jackson was born in Philadelphia, Pennsylvania. He studied music at Princeton University, the Royal College of Music in London, and the University of Southern California Scoring for Motion Picture and Television program. He was selected as a Sundance Lab Composer Fellow in 2017.

== Filmography ==
- 2027 - One Second After
- 2022 – Boys In Blue (4 Episodes)
- 2022 – Over/Under
- 2022 – You and Me This Summer
- 2021 – Let Me Be Me
- 2021 – DMX: Don't Try to Understand
- 2021 – Daddy Isn't Here Right Now
- 2021 – Audible
- 2019-2021 – Kids Behind Bars: Life or Parole (19 episodes)
- 2020 – Whose Vote Counts, Explained (3 episodes)
- 2019-2020 – Dating Around (12 episodes)
- 2020 – AKA Jane Roe
- 2019 – Maybe This Year
- 2019 – Liberation Heroes: The Last Eyewitnesses
- 2018 – Afflicted (6 episodes)
- 2017 – Hot Girls Wanted: Turned On (6 episodes)
- 2017 – City of Ghosts
- 2016 – Kate & Lily
- 2015 – Cartel Land
- 2014 – Blackout
- 2013 – Black Dog
- 2013 – Hear Me Roar
- 2013 – The Cynicism of Harvey Kay
- 2013 – The Ring of Rimachi
- 2013 – Imaginary Anonymous
- 2013 – Herman (3 episodes)
- 2012 – Color My World
- 2011 – Dear Mother
- 2011 – Israel Inside: How a Small Nation Makes a Big Difference
- 2011 – I'm Here. A Requiem for the Kids.

== Awards and nominations ==
Year	Result	Award	Category	Work	Ref.
2021	Won	Hollywood Music in Media Awards	Best Original Score — Short Film (Documentary)	Audible	
2021	Nominated	Cinema Eye Honors	Outstanding Achievement in Original Music Score	Cartel Land	
