= Sheila Nazarian =

Iranian-American plastic surgeon and television personality

- Born: 1979 (age 46–47); New York, U.S.
- Education: Columbia University (BA); Albert Einstein College of Medicine (MD); University of Southern California (MMM)
- Occupations: plastic surgeon and television personality
- Television: host of Netflix reality television series Skin Decision: Before and After

Sheila S. Nazarian (Persian: شیلا نظریان; born 1979) is an Iranian-American plastic surgeon and television personality. She is best known as the host of Netflix reality television series Skin Decision: Before and After, which was nominated for the Daytime Emmy Award for "Outstanding Lifestyle Series" in 2021. She has also appeared on television series such as The Real Housewives of Beverly Hills, Basketball Wives, and Revenge Body with Khloe Kardashian.

== Early life and education ==
Nazarian was born in New York to an Iranian Jewish family. Her father was a pathologist. She and her family returned to Iran following the Iranian Revolution in 1979 but were later barred from leaving the country. During the Iran-Iraq War, however, she and her mother were smuggled out of Iran into Pakistan, after which they reunited with her father and moved to Los Angeles, California.

Nazarian graduated Harvard-Westlake School in 1997. She then attended Columbia University, where she earned a Bachelor of Arts degree in economics with a pre-medical concentration.

== Career ==
=== Medicine ===
Nazarian initially planned to pursue a career in orthopedics before deciding to specialize in plastic surgery. After graduating from Columbia University, she attended the Albert Einstein College of Medicine, where she earned a Doctor of Medicine degree. She later completed a residency in cosmetic and reconstructive surgery at the University of Southern California (USC), where she also earned also earned a Master of Medical Management (MMM) from the Marshall School of Business. From 2013 to 2015, Nazarian served as an adjunct assistant professor in the Division of Plastic and Reconstructive Surgery at USC.

Nazarian went on establish her private practice, Nazarian Plastic Surgery, and a medical spa, Spa 26. She also founded The Skin Spot, an e-commerce retailer of skin care products, and the Nazarian Institute, a nonprofit organization that provides business and medical education to medical professionals.

=== Television ===
Nazarian has appeared as a guest on the daytime talk shows The Doctors and The Real. She has also appeared in reality television series, including The Real Housewives of Beverly Hills and Revenge Body with Khloe Kardashian, as well as on news and entertainment programs including Inside Edition, Extra, The Insider, E! News, and KGNS-TV.

In 2020, Nazarian began starring in Skin Decision: Before and After alongside nurse Jamie Sherrill. The series was nominated for the Daytime Emmy Award for "Outstanding Lifestyle Series" in 2021.

== Political views ==
Nazarian described herself as holding "conservative" views on gender identity and gun ownership, and expressed opposition to "wokeness" online.

Nazarian has voiced support for protests against the Islamic Republic in Iran and expressed opposition to a new Iran nuclear deal. In 2026, she stated that Iranians wanted "regime change," rather than "regime collapse."

During the 2021 Israel–Palestine Crisis, Nazarian supported Israel and spoke out against antisemitism online. In the days before the 2024 United States presidential election, social media influencer Hen Mazzig, an advocate for Israel, described Nazarian as "relentless" in her criticism of him over his support for Kamala Harris, leading Mazzig to block her on social media.

== Personal life ==
Nazarian is married to Fardad Mobin, a neurosurgeon. The pair have three children and reside in Bel Air neighborhood of Los Angeles.

== Television appearances ==
| Year | Title | Ref. |
|---|---|---|
| 2016 | Basketball Wives L.A. | |
| 2016 | Inside Edition | |
| 2016 | KGNS News | |
| 2017 | The Real Housewives of Beverly Hills | |
| 2017 | Revenge Body with Khloe Kardashian | |
| 2018 | The Doctors | |
| 2018 | The Real | |
| 2020 | Skin Decision: Before and After | |
| ? | Extra | |
| ? | E! News | |
| ? | The Insider | |
| 2022 | 50'inside | |
| 2022 | JBS News | |

== Awards and honors ==
Nazarian has earned multiple awards and honors throughout her career, including:

- 2015–2017, Super Doctors, Southern California Rising Stars
- 2016, Iranian Jewish Women's Organization Woman of the Year (Shamsi Hekmat Achievement Award)
- 2018–2022, Super Doctors, Southern California Super Doctors
- 2018, Top 2 Plastic Surgeon in Los Angeles by Locale Magazine
- 2018, Inaugural Aesthetic Industry Awards, winner of Social Media Authority Award
- 2019, Aesthetic Everything Award, winner of Diamond Crystal Award
- 2022, America's Best Plastic Surgeons by Newsweek
