= DMX: Don't Try to Understand =

- Promotional poster
- Directed by: Christopher Frierson; Clark Slater
- Produced by: Robert Alexander; Christopher Frierson; Pat Gallo; Sean Gordon-Loebl; Barak Moffitt; Steve Rifkind; Daniel Seliger; Clark Slater
- Starring: DMX
- Cinematography: Christopher Frierson; Sean Gordon-Loebl; Travis Libin; Clark Slater; John Tashiro
- Edited by: Matt Kliegman; Clark Slater; James Thayer; Steve Waite
- Music by: Jackson Greenberg
- Production companies: HBO Documentary Films; Ringer Films; Polygram Entertainment
- Distributed by: HBO; HBO Max
- Release dates: November 23, 2021 (Doc NYC); November 25, 2021 (HBO Max)
- Running time: 79 minutes
- Country: United States
- Language: English

DMX: Don't Try to Understand is a 2021 American documentary film directed by Christopher Frierson and Clark Slater. The film follows a year in the life of American rapper DMX.The film utilizes a handheld style to follow a year in the life of American rapper DMX following his 2019 release from federal prison. It examines his efforts to rebuild his music career and reconnect with family, while contextualizing his struggles through his turbulent childhood in Yonkers, New York.

The film premiered on November 23, 2021, and was released digitally on November 25, 2021, months after the rapper's death.

== Summary ==
The film is focused on a year in the life of DMX, following him after his release from prison (after serving a year for tax evasion) in January 2019 as he attempts to rebuild his music career and reconnect with family.

It also tracks his life, from his rough upbringing in Yonkers, New York, to his successful debut in the late 1990s. The documentary contextualizes Earl Simmons' 2019 comeback by tracking his origins in the School Street housing projects of Yonkers, where he relocated with his family at five years old. The film explores how his childhood was severely marred by poverty, domestic violence, and a turbulent family life, which eventually forced him into group homes like the Julia Dyckman Andrus Memorial School in the North Broadway neighborhood of Yonkers. In present-day footage, Simmons returns to his old Yonkers neighborhood stomping grounds to interact with local youth and reflect on how his traumatic upbringing catalyzed both his addiction struggles and the raw emotional intensity of his battle-rap career.

The rapper died on April 9, 2021.

== Production & development ==
The film was produced under executive producer Bill Simmons as part of his Music Box documentary series for HBO, developed by Ringer Films in association with Polygram Entertainment. The project was co-produced by DMX's long-time manager Paul Rosenberg, alongside Loud Records founder Steve Rifkind.

== Music ==
The original score for the documentary was composed by Jackson Greenberg, who designed the musical backdrop to complement the intimate tone of the project. In addition, the film features catalog tracks from Earl Simmons' career and was nominated for Best Music Supervision in a Docuseries at the 2022 Guild of Music Supervisors Awards, recognizing music supervisor Aminé Ramer.

== Cinematography ==
The cinematography for the film was handled by Travis Libin, Christopher Frierson, Clark Slater, Sean Gordon-Loebl, and John Tashiro. The camera crew used a handheld cinéma vérité visual style to document Earl Simmons immediately following his 2019 release from federal prison. This avoided standard, sit-down documentary interviews to emphasize real-time interactions with community members, fans, and family.

== Editing ==
The film was edited by a post-production team consisting of Clark Slater, Matt Kliegman, James Thayer, and Steve Waite. The editing process relied heavily on structuring raw observational footage captured over a calendar year into a cohesive, narrative arc. Because the project was finalized following Simmons' sudden death in April 2021, the editorial approach intentionally balanced his ongoing personal struggles with his community interactions, avoiding posthumous sentimentality.

== Cast ==
- Earl "DMX" Simmons
- Desiree Lindstrom
- Tashera Simmons
- Xavier Simmons
- Exodus Simmons

== Release ==
In December 2020, the film was picked up by HBO/Ringer Films and added to the Music Box series, executive produced by Bill Simmons. It had its world premiere at Doc NYC on November 23, 2021, and on HBO on November 25, 2021.

== Reception ==
Julian Kimble of GQ called the film "a difficult watch," concluding that "DMX died trying to do right, but unable to escape demons that followed him for decades." Johnny Loftus of Decider wrote, "With its equal notes of resilience, chronic self-destruction, outsized talent, and a troubled personal life, DMX: Don't Try to Understand offers a compelling portrait of a rapper gone too soon."

Several critics identified limitations in the film's execution and narrative scope. Writing for The Twin Geeks, Kevin Montes noted that the film's brisk runtime occasionally glossed over major career milestones, to focus heavily on his 2019 comeback tour. Reviewers on Letterboxd wrote that the film's production structure compromised a holistic exploration of DMX'ss life and long-term legacy. Critical consensus tracking on Rotten Tomatoes similarly reflected discomfort regarding the abrupt formatting changes and pacing constraints that were imposed by the broadcast runtime Also, a review from Movies Are Life suggested that the strict focus on personal struggles over his broader musical influence might alienate viewers who are not dedicated fans of hip-hop.
