= Money, Explained =

2021 docuseries on Netflix

- Genre: Documentary
- Narrated by: Tiffany Haddish; Jane Lynch; Edie Falco; Bobby Cannavale; Marcia Gay Harden
- Country of origin: United States
- Original language: English
- No. of seasons: 1
- No. of episodes: 5

Production
- Executive producers: Claire Gordon; Ezra Klein; Chad Mumm; Mark W. Olsen; Joe Posner
- Running time: 22 minutes
- Production company: Vox Media

Original release
- Network: Netflix
- Release: May 11, 2021

Money, Explained is a 2021 docuseries. The 5-episode series, a spin-off of Explained, is narrated by Tiffany Haddish, Jane Lynch, Edie Falco, Bobby Cannavale, and Marcia Gay Harden. The series was produced by Vox Media and released on May 11, 2021, on Netflix.

== Episodes ==
No.	Title	Narrator	Original release date
1	"Get Rich Quick"	Tiffany Haddish	May 11, 2021
2	"Credit Cards"	Jane Lynch	May 11, 2021
3	"Student Loans"	Edie Falco	May 11, 2021
4	"Gambling"	Bobby Cannavale	May 11, 2021
5	"Retirement"	Marcia Gay Harden	May 11, 2021

== See also ==
- Explained (TV series)
- Vox Media
