= St. Augustine Light =

Lighthouse in Florida, US

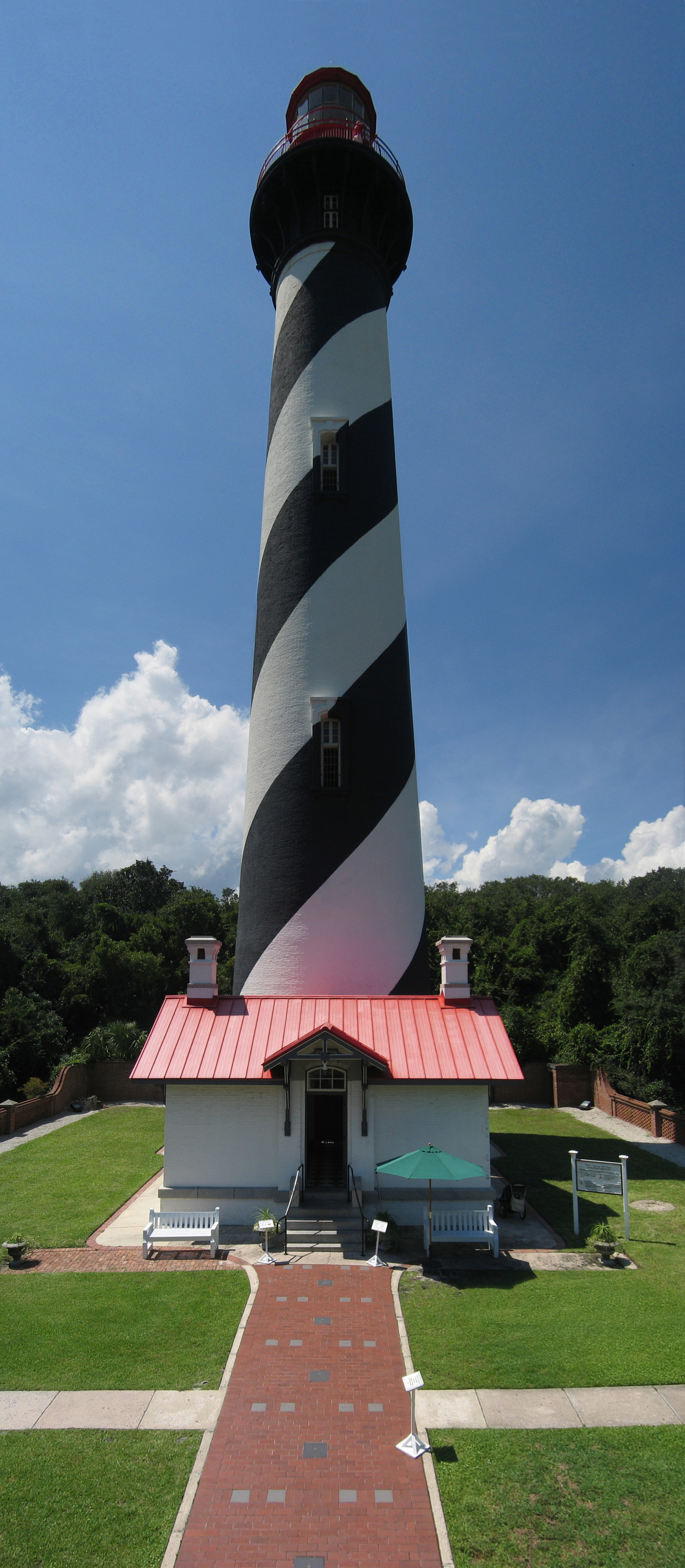
- The St. Augustine Light tower was built in 1874
- Location: Anastasia Island, Florida
- Coordinates: 29.88543°N 81.28852°W

Tower
- Constructed: 1824
- Foundation: first tower, coquina; second tower, brick on coquina
- Construction: first tower, coquina; second tower, brick
- Automated: 1955
- Height: first tower, 52 feet (16 m); second tower, 165 feet (50 m)
- Shape: first tower, square tower; second tower, conical tower
- Heritage: National Register of Historic Places listed place

Light
- First lit: first tower, ca. 1737; second tower, 1874
- Focal height: 49 m (161 ft)
- Lens: 1824: Winslow Lewis lamps with replectors; 1855: fourth order Fresnel lens; 1874: first-order Fresnel lens
- Range: 1874: fixed lamp, 17 nautical miles; 31 kilometres (19 mi) flashing lamp, 21 nautical miles; 39 kilometres (24 mi)
- Characteristic: prior to 1936, 3 minute fixed flash; in 1936 changed to 30-second flash
- St. Augustine Lighthouse and Keeper's Quarters
- U.S. National Register of Historic Places
- Built by: Hezekiah H. Pittee
- Architect: Paul J. Pelz
- NRHP reference No.: 81000668
- Added to NRHP: March 19, 1981

The St. Augustine Light Station is a privately maintained aid to navigation and an active, working lighthouse in St. Augustine, Florida. The current lighthouse stands at the north end of Anastasia Island and was built between 1871 and 1874. The tower is the second lighthouse tower in St. Augustine, the first being lit officially by the American territorial government in May 1824 as Florida's first lighthouse. However, both the Spanish and the British governments operated a major aid to navigation here including a series of wooden watch towers and beacons dating from 1565.

The current lighthouse tower, original first-order Fresnel Lens and the Light Station grounds are owned by the St. Augustine Lighthouse & Maritime Museum, Inc., a not-for-profit maritime museum. The museum is open to the public 360 days a year. Admission fees support continued preservation of the lighthouse and five other historic structures. Admissions and museum memberships also fund programs in maritime archaeology, traditional wooden boatbuilding, and maritime education. The non profit mission is to "discover, preserve, present and keep alive the stories of the nation's oldest port as symbolized by our working St. Augustine Lighthouse."

== History ==
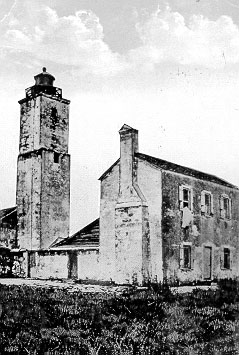
The St. Augustine lighthouse in 1824

St. Augustine was the site of the first lighthouse established in Florida by the new, territorial, American Government in 1824. According to some archival records and maps, this "official" American lighthouse was placed on the site of an earlier watchtower built by the Spanish as early as the late 16th century. A map of St. Augustine made by Baptista Boazio in 1589, depicting Sir Francis Drake's attack on the city, shows an early wooden watch tower near the Spanish structure, which was described as a "beacon" in Drake's account. By 1737, Spanish authorities built a more permanent tower from coquina taken from a nearby quarry on the island. Archival records are inconclusive as to whether the Spanish used the coquina tower as a lighthouse, but it seems plausible, given the levels of maritime trade by that time. The structure was regularly referred to as a "lighthouse" in documents—including ship's logs and nautical charts—dating to the British Period beginning in 1763.

In 1783, the Spanish once again took control of St. Augustine, and once again the lighthouse was improved. Swiss-Canadian engineer and marine surveyor Joseph Frederick Wallet DesBarres marks a coquina "Light House" on Anastasia Island in his 1780 engraving, "A Plan of the Harbour of St. Augustin". Jacques-Nicolas Bellin, Royal French Hydrographer, refers to the coquina tower as a "Batise" in Volume I of Petit Atlas Maritime. The accuracy of these scholars is debated still; DesBarres's work includes some obvious errors, but Bellin is considered highly qualified. His work provides an important reference to St. Augustine's geography and landmarks in 1764. Facing erosion and a changing coastline, the old tower crashed into the sea in 1880, but not before a new lighthouse was lit. Today, the tower ruins are a submerged archaeological site.

Early lamps in the first tower burned lard oil. Multiple lamps with silver reflectors were replaced by a fourth order Fresnel lens in 1855, greatly improving the lighthouse's range and eliminating some maintenance issues.

At the beginning of the Civil War, future mayor Paul Arnau, a local Menorcan harbor master, along with the lightkeeper, a woman named Maria Mestre de los Dolores Andreu (who, in this role, became the first Hispanic-American woman to serve in the Coast Guard), removed the lens from the old lighthouse and hid it, in order to block Union shipping lanes as well as to help blockade runners remain hidden.

The lens and clock works were recovered after Arnau was held captive on a ship off-shore and forced to reveal their location.

By 1870, beach erosion was threatening the first lighthouse. Construction on a new light tower began in 1871 during Florida's reconstruction period. In the meantime, a jetty of coquina and brush was built to protect the old tower. A trolley track brought building supplies from the ships at the dock. The new tower was completed in 1874, and put into service with a new first order Fresnel lens. It was lit for the first time in October by keeper William Russell. Russell was the first lighthouse keeper in the new tower, and the only keeper to have worked both towers.

For 20 years, the site was manned by head-keeper William A. Harn of Philadelphia. Major Harn was a Union war hero who had commanded his own battery at the Battle of Gettysburg. With his wife, Kate Skillen Harn, of Maine, he had six daughters. The family was known for serving lemonade out on the porches of the keepers' house, which was constructed as a Victorian duplex during Harn's tenure.

On August 31, 1886, the Charleston earthquake caused the tower to "sway violently", according to the keeper's log, but there was no recorded damage.

In 1885, after many experiments with different types of oils, the lamp was converted from lard oil to kerosene.

During World War II, Coast Guard men and women trained in St. Augustine, and used the lighthouse as a lookout post for enemy ships and submarines which frequented the coastline.

In 1907, indoor plumbing reached the light station, followed by electricity in the keeper's quarters in 1925. The light itself was electrified in 1936, and automated in 1955. As the light was automated, positions for three keepers slowly dwindled down to two and then one. No longer housing lighthouse families by the 1960s, the keepers' house was rented to local residents. Eventually it was declared surplus, and St. Johns County bought it in 1970. In that year the house suffered a devastating fire at the hands of an unknown arsonist.

== Restoration ==
In 1980, a small group of 15 women in the Junior Service League of St. Augustine (JSL) signed a 99-year lease with the county for the keeper's house and surrounding grounds and began a massive restoration project. Shortly after the JSL adopted the restoration, the League signed a 30-year lease with the Coast Guard to begin a restoration effort on the lighthouse tower itself. The lighthouse was subsequently placed on the National Register of Historic Places in 1981 due to the efforts of local preservationist and author Karen Harvey.

The antique lens was functional until it was damaged by rifle fire in 1986, and 19 of the prisms were broken. Lamplighter Hank Mears called the FBI to investigate this crime. As the lens continued to weaken, the Coast Guard considered removing it and replacing it with a more modern, airport beacon. Again championed by the JSL, this plan was dismissed and the 9-foot (2.7 m)-tall lens was restored, with the help of retired Coast Guardsmen Joe Cocking and Nick Johnston. This was the first restoration of its kind in the nation. Cocking and Johnston continue to work with Museum staff and care for the lens. Volunteers from Northrop Grumman Corporation and Florida Power & Light clean and inspect the lens and works every week.

Today, the St. Augustine Light Station consists of the 165-foot (50 m) 1874 tower, the 1876 Keepers' House, two summer kitchens added in 1886, a 1941 U.S. Coast Guard barracks and a 1936 garage that was home to a jeep repair facility during World War II. The site is also a National Oceanic and Atmospheric Administration weather station.

== St. Augustine Lighthouse & Maritime Museum ==
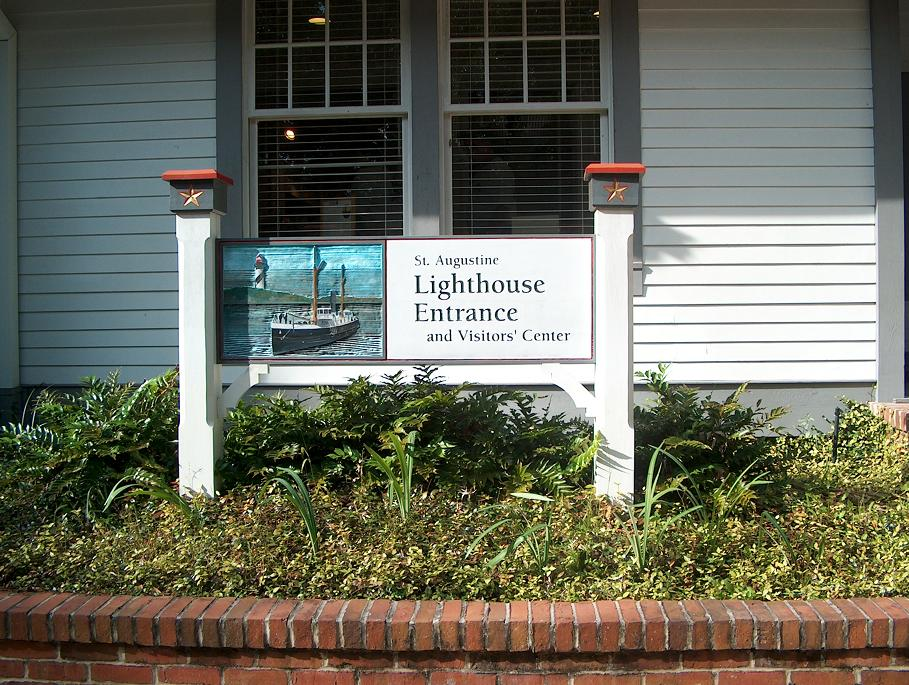
Visitors' Center

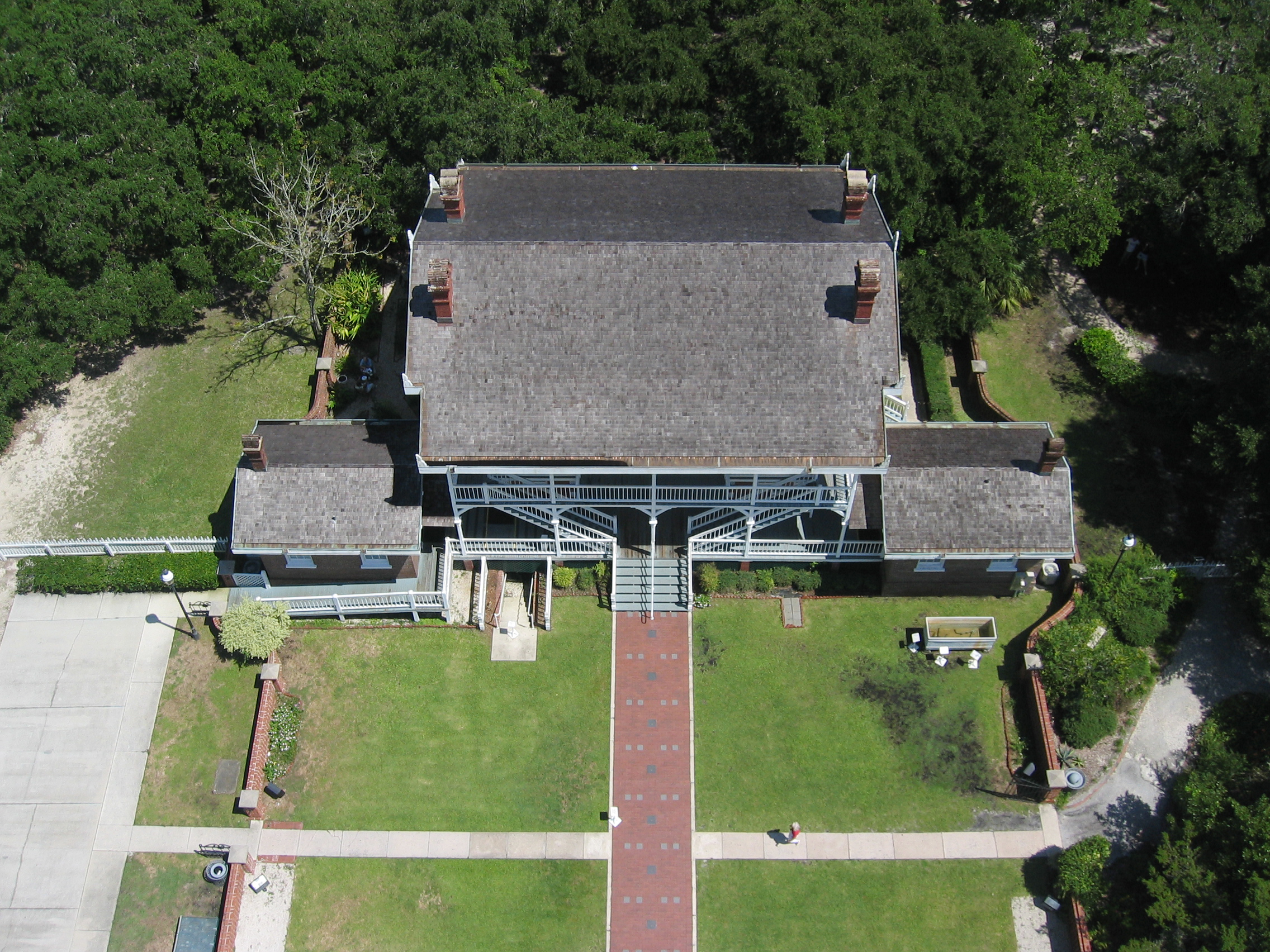
View of the Keeper's House from the tower

In 1994, the Lighthouse Museum of St. Augustine opened full-time to the public. A community-based board of trustees was created in 1998. The men and women of the volunteer board are charged with holding the site in trust for future generations. In 2002, under the direction of then Executive Director Kathy Fleming, ownership of the tower and historic Fresnel lens was transferred from the U.S. Coast Guard through the General Services Administration and the National Park Service to the St. Augustine Lighthouse and Museum, Inc. This was the first such transfer of a U.S. lighthouse to a non-profit organization. The Museum keeps the light burning as a private aid-to-navigation. In 2016 the museum changed its name to the St. Augustine Lighthouse & Maritime Museum.

The St. Augustine Lighthouse & Maritime Museum aims to preserve local maritime history, keep alive the story of the nation's oldest port, and connect young people to marine sciences. The museum board and staff also work to help save other lighthouses in Florida and across the nation, coordinating efforts with several federal agencies and volunteer groups such as the Florida Lighthouse Association. The Lighthouse employs close to 50 individuals, and is visited annually by over 200,000 people including 54,000 school-aged children.

The museum maintains an active archaeological program (Lighthouse Archaeological Maritime Program, or LAMP) that researches maritime archaeological sites around St. Augustine and the First Coast region. Staff archaeologists have discovered a number of historic shipwrecks and investigated many others, along with other maritime sites such as breakwaters, plantation wharf remains, and the nearby remains of St. Augustine's original lighthouse. The museum also researches other aspects of maritime heritage including boat building and the history of the local and regional shrimping industry, and maintains a growing collection of World War II artifacts focusing on the history of the U.S. Coast Guard in St. Augustine. The Keeper's house is used to display a series of exhibits related to these various aspects of St. Augustine's maritime history. The Lighthouse also hosts a volunteer-driven heritage boat building program, which has built a number of traditional wooden boats from various time periods in the port's history.

In early 2010, the First Light Maritime Society was established as the support organization for the St. Augustine Lighthouse & Museum and LAMP. The use of this fundraising organization was discontinued by the Lighthouse & Maritime Museum with its re-branding in 2016.

=== Lighthouse Archaeological Maritime Program (LAMP) ===
The St. Augustine Lighthouse & Maritime Museum, as part of its ongoing mission to discover, present, and keep alive the maritime history of America's oldest port, has funded maritime archaeology in St. Johns County waters since 1997. In 1999, the Lighthouse formalized its research program, creating the Lighthouse Archaeological Maritime Program, Inc. (LAMP). LAMP is one of the few research organizations in the nation employing full-time professional marine archaeologists and conservators that is not a part of a university or government entity.

LAMP's founding Director was William "Billy Ray" Morris, who oversaw archaeological research and educational programs until his departure in 2005. In March 2006, underwater archaeologist Chuck Meide took over control of the organization as its new Director, with the assistance of then Director of Archaeology Dr. Sam Turner. Today, LAMP maintains three archaeologists and three archaeological conservators, and regularly employs a large number of volunteers and student interns.

To date, the oldest identified shipwreck discovered in St. Augustine waters is the sloop Industry, a British supply ship lost on May 6, 1764, while attempting to make port with munitions, tools, and other equipment for the garrisons in Britain's recently acquired colony of Florida. Artifacts from the wreck site—including eight cast-iron cannon, an iron swivel gun, crates of iron shot, iron mooring anchors, millstones, and boxes of tools such as axes, shovel blades, knives, trowels, files, and handsaws—were well-preserved, and provided an unprecedented glimpse into the needs of British soldiers and administrators on the Florida frontier. Many of these items were recovered and conserved by LAMP archaeologists, and have been on display in the maritime museum in the Lighthouse keeper's house.

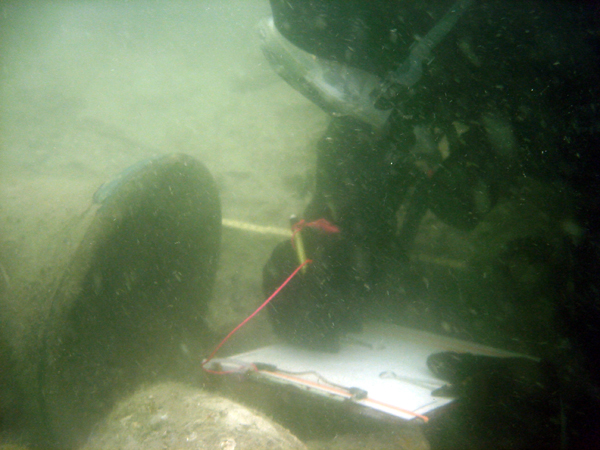
LAMP archaeologist recording the ship's bell discovered on the 18th century "Storm Wreck."

In 2009, LAMP archaeologists discovered the second oldest shipwreck in northeast Florida waters, an unidentified colonial sailing vessel known as the "Storm Wreck". The wreck site, completely buried when initially discovered, has been subject to excavations each summer from 2010 to 2012, and seems to consist of scattered remnants of cargo, ship's equipment and components, military hardware, and personal possessions. LAMP archaeologists, along with volunteer and student divers, have documented and recovered a wide range of well-preserved artifacts, including numerous iron and copper cauldrons, pewter spoons and plates, an iron tea kettle, ceramic and glass fragments, belt and shoe buckles, a brass candlestick, bricks, a flintlock Queen Anne pistol, three Brown Bess muskets (two of which were loaded, one with buck and ball), thousands of lead shot, military buttons (including one from a Royal Provincial unit and one from the 71st Regiment of Foot, Fraser's Highlanders), a cask of nails, tools and navigational equipment (including a sight from an octant), ship's hardware and rigging elements, the ship's lead deck pump, a bronze ship's bell, a 4-pounder cannon, and a 9-pounder carronade, believed to be the second oldest in the world. After three seasons of excavation and laboratory analysis of artifacts, it is believed that this vessel was a ship involved in the December 18, 1782, evacuation of Charleston at the end of the American Revolution, carrying Loyalist refugees and troops to St. Augustine, which was a loyal British colony at the time. This was the final British fleet to leave Charleston, and when it arrived between December 24 and 31, 1782, as many as sixteen vessels were lost on the sandbar in front of the St. Augustine inlet. In 2015-2016 LAMP discovered three additional historic shipwrecks, and is currently excavating one of these that appears to date to the second half of the 18th century, the so-called "Anniversary Wreck."

LAMP has also excavated two historically significant 19th century wrecks offshore St. Augustine: a wooden-hulled steamship, and a centerboard schooner. The identities of both wrecks remain unknown, but the study of their remains has led to a greater understanding of the economic and technological evolution of St. Augustine at the dawn of modernity. The latter shipwreck carried a cargo of cement in barrels which was probably intended for the city's late 19th century building boom, associated with industrialist entrepreneur Henry Flagler. LAMP has also investigated many beached shipwrecks, including the schooner Deliverance at Mickler's Landing, and the bow of a vessel believed to be Caroline Eddy, lost near Matanzas Inlet in 1880, among multiple others which cannot yet be identified. In addition to these and other shipwrecks, LAMP has investigated a wide variety of archaeological sites in St. Augustine and the greater Florida First Coast region representing Florida's French, Spanish, British, and Early American periods. These include British plantation landings, community boatyard foundations, ferry and steamboat landings, ballast dump sites, colonial wharves, inundated terrestrial sites, and the site of America's first free African American settlement, Fort Mose. Current work includes the implementation of the First Coast Maritime Archaeology Project, a comprehensive program of research and outreach focusing on the waters around St. Augustine and elsewhere in northeast Florida. This project was partially funded from 2007 to 2009, 2014 to 2019, and 2021-2025 by historic preservation grants awarded by the state of Florida.

== Ghost stories ==
According to ghost hunters, the lighthouse and surrounding buildings have a history of paranormal activity. The lighthouse has been featured in episodes of the Syfy television series Ghost Hunters, and also on the paranormal TV program My Ghost Story.

Researcher Joe Nickell who investigated has written that there is no credible evidence the lighthouse is haunted. He noted that supposed spooky noises or sounds from the tower have mundane explanations such as seagulls or the wind.

St. Augustine Lighthouse was featured as one of the haunted locations on the paranormal TV series Most Terrifying Places in America on an episode titled "Restless Dead", which aired on the Travel Channel in 2018.
