= Maria Andreu =

American US Coastguard employee

- Occupation: Lighthouse keeper
- Spouse: Joseph Juan Andreu
- Children: 8

Maria Mestre de los Dolores Andreu (April 25, 1801 – ?) was an American of Menorcan descent known as the second US Coastguard female employee. A lighthouse keeper, she was the first Hispanic-American woman to command a federal shore installation. Marilyn Dykman said of her "Maria Andreu's leadership and perseverance as keeper of the lighthouse inspired generations of women to shine as female employees within federal service through her beacon of light."

== Early life ==
Andreu was born on April 25, 1801, to parents Bartholomew Mestre and Marianna Lorenzo Mestre, and baptized on April 30 of the same year. She married Joseph Juan Andreu on May 6, 1822; Joseph Andreu served as keeper of the St. Augustine Lighthouse from 1854 to 1859. The couple had eight children.

== Career ==
Andreu was the first Hispanic woman to serve in the Coast Guard and the first to command a federal shore installation. She became keeper of the lighthouse on January 7, 1860, after her husband Joseph, who had been the lighthouse keeper since 1854, died. According to a report in the St. Augustine Examiner on December 10, 1859, he was whitewashing the tower when the scaffolding collapsed and he fell about 60 feet onto the roof of the building where oil for the light was stored. Joseph Andreu was a cousin of the first St. Augustine lighthouse keeper, Juan Andreu, who served from 1824 to 1845. Joseph's father, Tomas, was the brother of Juan's father, Antonio.

Maria served as keeper at a salary of $400 ($14,333 in 2025) a year until 1861, when the light was ordered darkened by the then Confederate States Secretary of the Navy, Stephen Mallory, and George C. Gibbs. She is believed to have left St. Augustine and moved to Georgia, where she spent the rest of her life in obscurity.
