= Chris Fischer =

American chef

- Spouse: Amy Schumer (m. 2018; div. 2026)
- Children: 1
- Culinary career
- Previous restaurants
- Beach Plum Inn & Restaurant
- Television show
- Amy Schumer Learns to Cook
- Awards
- 2014 StarChefs.com Coastal New England Rising Stars Award
- 2016 James Beard Award for best cookbook

Chris Fischer is an American chef and farmer from Martha's Vineyard, Massachusetts. He is the ex husband of stand-up comedian and actress Amy Schumer.

== Biography ==
A native of Martha's Vineyard, Fischer grew up on a farm and learned about food from his father, Albert, a former commercial fisherman, who taught him how to hunt, fish and farm. Fischer spent much of his boyhood on Martha's Vineyard and went to a two-room schoolhouse that has since been converted into a police station.

When he became a chef, he worked under Mario Batali at Babbo while living in Manhattan. He also cooked in Europe, working at the American Academy in Rome and London's The River Cafe before returning to Martha's Vineyard to work there full-time in 2007.

Fischer ran his family farm, Beetlebung Farm, a five-acre property that his grandfather purchased in the 1950s or in 1961. He was the executive chef at the Beach Plum Inn & Restaurant for several years and was awarded the 2014 StarChefs.com Coastal New England Rising Stars Award. In 2016, he was awarded with the James Beard Award for his book The Beetlebung Farm Cookbook, which he wrote with co-author Catherine Young. He was also a part-time instructor at Boston University's Metropolitan College Programs in Food & Wine.

== Personal life ==
Fischer married comedian and actress Amy Schumer on February 13, 2018, in Malibu, California. On May 5, 2019, Schumer gave birth to their son. Schumer revealed in her Netflix special Amy Schumer Growing that Chris Fischer is on the autism spectrum. Fischer and Schumer announced their separation on December 12, 2025. Fischer and Schumer divorced in September 2026.

== Filmography ==
Year	Title	Summary	Notes
2020	Amy Schumer Learns to Cook	A cooking show during the COVID-19 pandemic, filmed while quarantined at home.	Chris teaches his wife Amy, also featuring son Gene, and nanny Jane.

== Awards ==
His cookbook, The Beetlebung Farm Cookbook, which memorialized a year of cooking and living on Martha's Vineyard, won the 2016 James Beard Award for American Cooking.
