= Girl Scout Cookie Championship =

Original release
- Network: Food Network
- Release: February 3 – February 24, 2020

Girl Scout Cookie Championship is a television series on the Food Network. The series debuted in 2020. The series is hosted by Alyson Hannigan, while Katie Lee and Nacho Aguirre are permanent judges.

== See also ==
- List of 2020 American television debuts
