= Matt Fraser (psychic) =

American purported psychic medium

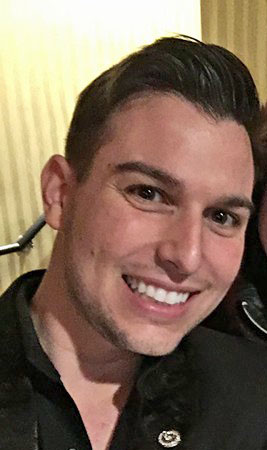
- Fraser in 2018
- Born: Providence, Rhode Island
- Occupation: Television personality
- Years active: 2010–present
- Known for: Meet the Frasers, Mediumship, psychic prediction
- Website: www.meetmattfraser.com

Matthew L. Fraser is an American psychic medium, author, and television personality. He is best known for his central role in the reality TV show Meet the Frasers. He has written four books including the We Never Die: Secrets of the Afterlife.

Fraser was targeted in an unsuccessful sting known as Operation Peach Pit, reported on in The New York Times in 2019. Fraser uses classic cold reading techniques to convince his audience that he possesses paranormal powers.

== Career ==
Prior to becoming a professional psychic, Fraser trained as a paramedic and physician assistant. He has said that, when working as an Emergency Medical Technician, he realized he had an ability to help people emotionally, and that he once did psychic readings while working at an East Providence, Rhode Island beauty salon.

Fraser says he "inherited his gift to hear 'messages from heaven' from his grandmother and his mother." According to the South Florida Gay News, Fraser claims his first contact with the dead was with the spirit of his grandmother. He has also said that his native American heritage is important to his psychic abilities.

In 2012, Fraser published a book, The Secrets to Unlocking Your Psychic Ability. His second book, When Heaven Calls, was released in 2020.

Fraser claims that he has worked with local police and private investigators on cold cases, in which he helped families locate their missing children.

Fraser and his wife, Alexa Papigiotis, live in Cranston, Rhode Island. Fraser's mother, who also claims to be a psychic, is his office manager.

=== Meet the Frasers ===
Fraser stars in a reality TV show, Meet the Frasers, on E!. The series focused on Fraser and his family, including Papigiotis, his mother and his sister Maria Fraser, who said in a promo that "I don't believe in psychics... But, I support my brother and I respect what he does, 'cause he's making money." A second season was planned, but was delayed due to the COVID-19 pandemic.

== Critical analysis ==
=== Live shows ===
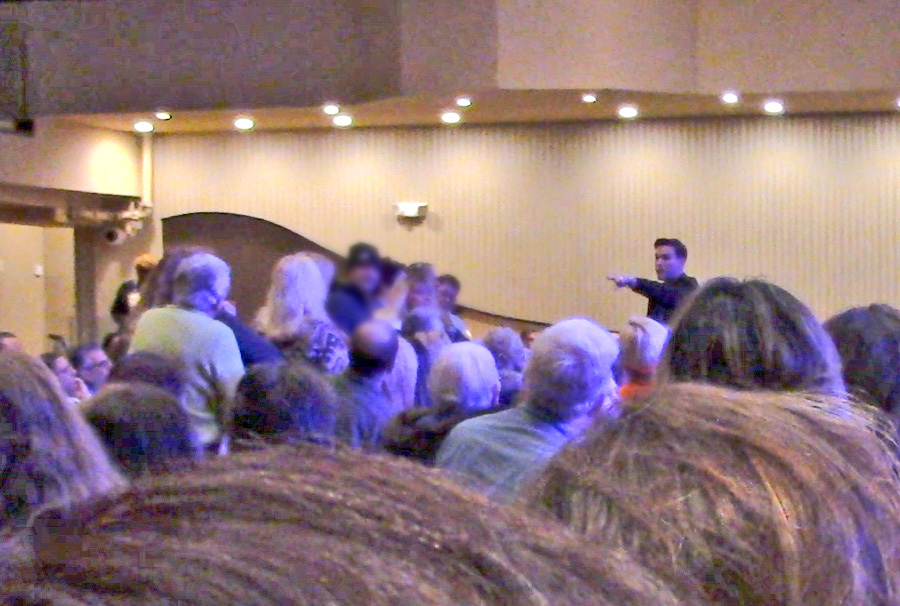
Fraser addressing a row in his audience, January 2018

Critics and the media have attended Fraser's live shows, and reported on the cold reading techniques being used:

- Paranormal investigator Kenny Biddle wrote: "I watched Fraser ask entire rows of people to stand up at a time then commence throwing out general statements (e.g., 'I'm seeing a father figure that passed') and waiting for someone in the row to claim it was their relative ... he was actually giving himself a one-in-twelve chance that someone will be hooked." Biddle also noted that Fraser may playfully scold an audience member if they were not forthcoming with the psychic connection required to continue his routine.
- Skeptic Susan Gerbic wrote: "The wordplay used by a medium who is cold reading is only something you can understand if you slow it down and replay it. The statements made are usually so general that they would fit most people of a given generation. But the performer adds enough dialog to make it sound really personal and specific to the sitter."
- The New York Times reported: "Fraser was a brilliant performer... It was a classic cold reading, all generalized notions searching for something slightly more specific to move [on] to."
- Mentalist Mark Edward observed that: "[Fraser] goes to one end and stands just slightly in front of the row, leaning forward so he can see all their faces and body language. He states a standard fishing line such as he's 'getting an impression' of something... he brings up into view his pointing index finger and begins the process of generally pointing it at the row... scanning for a reaction."

=== Operation Peach Pit ===
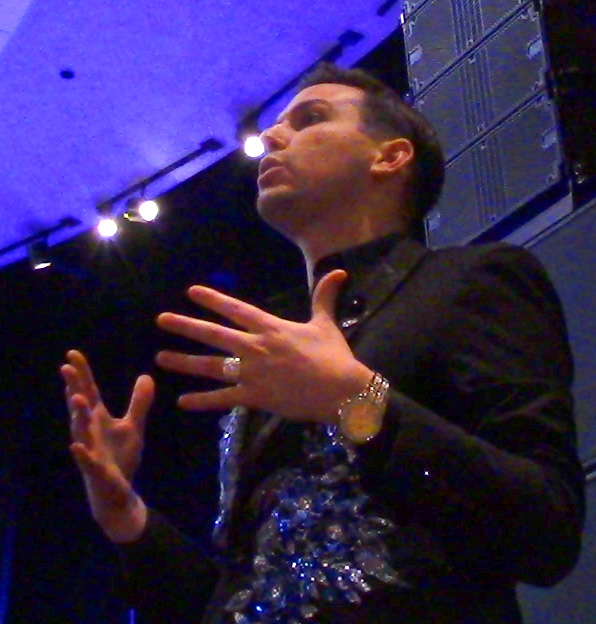
Fraser at the Valley Forge Casino Resort, January 2018

The New York Times reporter Jack Hitt was embedded with a team of skeptics to observe what was called "Operation Peach Pit", a sting following a procedure similar to one previously used against Thomas John. In this case, the target was Fraser. According to Hitt, Fraser "resembles Tom Cruise in the role of an oversharing altar boy. He has been on the circuit for years, has a book under his belt, and works some Doubletree or Crowne Plaza back room every two or three days". Kenny Biddle and a group of five friends, using aliases matching the faked Facebook accounts, attended Fraser's show at the Valley Forge Casino in King of Prussia for the sting. As Biddle reported in Skeptical Inquirer, none of the team members were selected for a reading.

== Works and publications ==
- Fraser, Matt (2013). The Secrets to Unlocking Your Psychic Ability. Health Communications Inc. ISBN 978-0-6159-5965-8.
- Fraser, Matt (2020). When Heaven Calls: Life Lessons From America's Top Psychic Medium. Gallery Books. ISBN 978-1-9821-4005-2. OCLC 1137737298.
- Fraser, Matt (2022). We Never Die: Secrets of the Afterlife. Simon & Schuster. ISBN 9781668001097.
- Fraser, Matt (2024). Don't Wait Till You're Dead: Spirits' Advice from the Afterlife. Gallery Books. ISBN 9781668026892.
