= The Mind, Explained =

2019 docuseries on Netflix

- Genre: Docuseries
- Narrated by: Emma Stone (S1) Julianne Moore (S2)
- Theme music composer: Jackson Greenberg
- Opening theme: "Explained Theme Song"
- Country of origin: United States
- Original language: English
- No. of seasons: 2
- No. of episodes: 10

Production
- Running time: 19–21 minutes
- Production company: Vox Media

Original release
- Network: Netflix
- Release: September 12, 2019 – November 19, 2021

Related
- Explained; Sex, Explained; Coronavirus, Explained

The Mind, Explained is a 2019 documentary television series. The series is narrated by American actress Emma Stone on Season 1 and Julianne Moore on Season 2, and examines themes such as what happens inside human brains when they dream or use psychedelic drugs. The episodes explore topics including memory, dreams, anxiety, mindfulness, and psychedelics. The Mind, Explained is a spin-off of Vox's Netflix show Explained.

The series makes use of interviews, cartoons, and animation.

== Episodes ==
Season	Episodes	Originally released
1	5	September 12, 2019
2	5	November 19, 2021

There are 5 episodes, each lasting around 20 minutes.

=== Season 1 (2019) ===
No. overall	No. in season	Title	Original release date
1	1	"Memory"	September 12, 2019
2	2	"Dreams"	September 12, 2019
3	3	"Anxiety"	September 12, 2019
4	4	"Mindfulness"	September 12, 2019
5	5	"Psychedelics"	September 12, 2019

=== Season 2 (2021) ===
No. overall	No. in season	Title	Original release date
6	1	"How to Focus"	November 19, 2021
7	2	"Teenage Brain"	November 19, 2021
8	3	"Personality"	November 19, 2021
9	4	"Creativity"	November 19, 2021
10	5	"Brainwashing"	November 19, 2021

== Release ==
The Mind, Explained was released globally on September 12, 2019 on Netflix.

== Reception ==
The show received mostly positive reviews. The website Decider called it "one of those shows you turn on when you just want to see something short and interesting without having to follow a plot. And though it can be superficial at times, you generally come away from each episode knowing something about your brain you didn't know before." The Review Geek calls the series "[maybe not] the most cerebrally challenging documentary series on the topic but it does have enough engaging material to make for an educational and entertaining watch." While the delivery was appreciated, most people found the content to be fleeting. Emma Stone's narration was widely regarded as doing well.

The first episode of the series has been found lacking compared to others by many reviewers.
