= Sex, Explained =

2020 docu-series on Netflix

- Genre: Docuseries
- Narrated by: Janelle Monáe
- Theme music composer: Jackson Greenberg
- Opening theme: "Explained Theme Song"
- Country of origin: United States
- Original language: English
- No. of seasons: 1
- No. of episodes: 5

Production
- Running time: 17–26 minutes
- Production company: Vox Media

Original release
- Network: Netflix
- Release: January 2, 2020

Related
- Explained; The Mind, Explained; Coronavirus, Explained

Sex, Explained is an American documentary limited series produced by Vox. The series, along with The Mind, Explained, is a spin-off of the television series Explained. Episodes of the show explore various topics around the subject of sex, seeking to explain nuances and trends. The series is narrated by Janelle Monáe and debuted on Netflix on January 2, 2020.

== Episodes ==
No.	Title	Original release date
1	"Sexual Fantasies"	January 2, 2020
Despite how taboo people often think their own sexual fantasies are, research shows that most sexual fantasies fall into the same three basic categories: group sex, novelty and control. This is due to common biological, psychological, and societal influences on sexual fantasy themes, in different parts of the world and at different times in history. These commonalities and themes can be seen in popular media portrayal of sexual fantasies, both mainstream and in pornographic media.
2	"Attraction"	January 2, 2020
The nature of human attraction is discussed – in heterosexual, homosexual, and gender fluid relationships – covering how the evolutionary imperative of progeny interplays with human experience of sex that is exterior from procreation, all mixing together to affect who and what we are attracted to.
3	"Birth Control"	January 2, 2020
The history of birth control is discussed, both hormonal and non-hormonal. Incidence of dangerous side effects, non-consensual experimentation and enforced or coerced sterilization are highlighted. Current progress in birth control options across the globe are also covered. Some representative males are interviewed, discussing their willingness to take male-focused birth control options like a pill or an injection to the testicles.
4	"Fertility"	January 2, 2020
Male and female infertility is a growing medical advancement, though far more effort is made to understand infertility issues in women – despite research showing that most males living today have a lower sperm count than their ancestors. There are also risks of birth defects from conception with older sperm, which are presently under-researched. Challenges for same-sex couples and single parents who wish to have biological children are also leading to redefinitions of infertility. Footage from the birth of the first child conceived via IVF shown and fertility expert Dr. Sherman Silber discusses advances in treatments like ovary tissue freezing and intracytoplasmic sperm injection (ICSI).
5	"Childbirth"	January 2, 2020
800 women die in child birth each day, globally, and a global survey showed that up to 30% of women rate their childbirth as a traumatic experience. Anthropologist Holly Dunsworth explains that labor for non-human primates is much easier than for humans. As obstetrics became a recognized medical field, and induction via pitocin was developed, pregnancy further became a somewhat less uncertain process. The "cascade of interventions" at play in a medical child birth have led to an excess of c-sections and higher rates of post-traumatic distress (PTSD) and postpartum depression (PPD). There have also been positive and negative results from the push back toward "natural childbirth", including women who choose epidurals or who require c-sections feeling shamed for their choices or circumstances.

== Reception ==
Reviews for Sex, Explained have been generally positive. Review aggregator Rotten Tomatoes reported an approval rating of 100% based on 5 reviews. The Daily Beast's Jordan Julian said, "Though by no means a substitute for comprehensive sex ed, the Janelle Monáe-narrated series provides adults with a valuable supplement to whatever knowledge they may (or may not) have gleaned from school and experience." Ashlie D. Stevens of Salon described the series as an "entertaining and informative start to some more adult-oriented sex education." Stevens also noted how the series reflected the strength of the Explained series, saying, "But Sex, Explained excels in finding a voice that is smarter than it is steamy, which isn't a surprise if you've watched the Explained Netflix series that preceded it."
