= Murdered by Morning =

- Genre: Docudrama; True crime
- Country of origin: United States
- Original language: English
- No. of seasons: 1
- No. of episodes: 9

Production
- Executive producers: Carolyn Day; David Garfinkle; Haylee Vance; Jay Renfroe; Shelley Schulze
- Editor: Michael Burke
- Production company: Renegade 83 Entertainment

Original release
- Network: Oxygen
- Release: January 19 – March 29, 2020

Murdered by Morning is a television series on Oxygen that premiered in January 2020.

== Episodes ==
No.	Title	Directed by	Written by	Original release date	U.S. viewers (millions)
1	"Last Call"	Unknown	Unknown	January 19, 2020	N/A
Murder of Lindsay Nichols in New Orleans
2	"Dead of Winter"	Unknown	Unknown	January 26, 2020	N/A
Murder of Morna Jean Brennen in Maplewood, Minnesota
3	"Acting On Evil"	Unknown	Unknown	February 9, 2020	N/A
Murder of Jessie Blodgett
4	"Inside Job"	Unknown	Unknown	February 16, 2020	N/A
Murder of Larry Wells in Hamburg, New York
5	"Mother's Day Murder"	Unknown	Unknown	February 23, 2020	N/A
Murder of Nannette Krenzel in Chicago (later found in Pleasant Prairie, Wisconsin)
6	"Party Crashers"	Unknown	Unknown	March 1, 2020	N/A
Murder of Steven Merritt in Mission Viejo, California
7	"Smokey Mountain Murders"	Unknown	Unknown	March 8, 2020	N/A
Murder of Tommy Griffin in Maryville, Tennessee
8	"Murder in the Heartland"	Unknown	Unknown	March 15, 2020	N/A
Murder of Kelly Eckart in Edinburgh, Indiana
9	"Gambling with Death"	Unknown	Unknown	March 22, 2020	N/A
Murder of Shannon Sanderson in Memphis, Tennessee
10	"A Father's Plea"	Unknown	Unknown	March 29, 2020	N/A
Murder of Kathleen Noble in East Palo Alto, California

== See also ==
- 2020 in American television
