= Coronavirus, Explained =

2020 docu-series on Netflix

- Genre: Docuseries
- Narrated by: J. K. Simmons; Laura Linney; Idris Elba
- Theme music composer: Jackson Greenberg
- Opening theme: "Explained Theme Song"
- Country of origin: United States
- Original language: English
- No. of seasons: 1
- No. of episodes: 3

Production
- Executive producers: Claire Gordon; Joe Posner; Ezra Klein; Chad Mumm; Mark W. Olsen
- Producers: Sara Masetti; Sam Ellis; Marie Cascione
- Cinematography: Cory Popp
- Editors: Jan Kobal; Denny Thomas
- Running time: 20–26 minutes
- Production company: Vox Media

Original release
- Network: Netflix
- Release: April 26 – June 16, 2020

Related
- Explained; The Mind, Explained; Sex, Explained

Coronavirus, Explained is an American documentary limited series produced by Vox. The series, along with The Mind, Explained and Sex, Explained, is a spin-off of the television series Explained. Episodes of the show explore various topics around the subject of the COVID-19 pandemic, exploring the efforts to stop it. The series premiered on Netflix on April 26, 2020. The series is narrated by J. K. Simmons, Laura Linney, and Idris Elba.

== Episodes ==
No.	Title	Narrator	Original release date
1	"This Pandemic"	J. K. Simmons	April 26, 2020
An update on an episode of Explained titled "The Next Pandemic", a look at how the virus grew and expanded around the globe.
2	"The Race for a Vaccine"	Laura Linney	June 16, 2020
An overview on vaccines and the race to develop one to end the COVID-19 pandemic.
3	"How to Cope"	Idris Elba	June 16, 2020
A discussion on coping mechanisms as the world grapples with the stress of the pandemic and a global lockdown.

== Production ==
=== Filming ===
Vox Media planned to have ten weeks to work on each episode; however, the first episode was rushed to be released in two and a half weeks due to the prevalence of the COVID-19 pandemic. They had already interviewed Bill Gates for an episode in season 2 of Explained called "The Next Pandemic" before the pandemic began, and Vox Media ended up using some of that footage for their first episode.

=== Release ===
The trailer for the mini-series was released on April 22, 2020. The first episode was released on April 26, 2020, with the second and third episode being released on June 16, 2020.
