= Ghost Loop =

- Country of origin: United States

Original release
- Network: Travel Channel
- Release: January 2020

Ghost Loop is a television series that premiered on the Travel Channel in January 2020. The show features Matt Lytle, Eric Vitale, Chris Califf, Kris Star, and Sean Austin all of whom attempt to investigate alleged paranormal activity within households.

== See also ==
- 2020 in American television
