= The Hidden Kingdoms of China =

American television series

- Narrated by: Michelle Yeoh
- Country of origin: United States
- Original language: English

Original release
- Network: National Geographic
- Release: January 2020

The Hidden Kingdoms of China (previously reported as China's Hidden Kingdoms) is a television series that premiered on the National Geographic in February 2020. It is an exploration of China's animals and landscapes. The series is narrated by Michelle Yeoh. The series was also critiqued for not focusing enough on conservation.
