= Meet the Frasers =

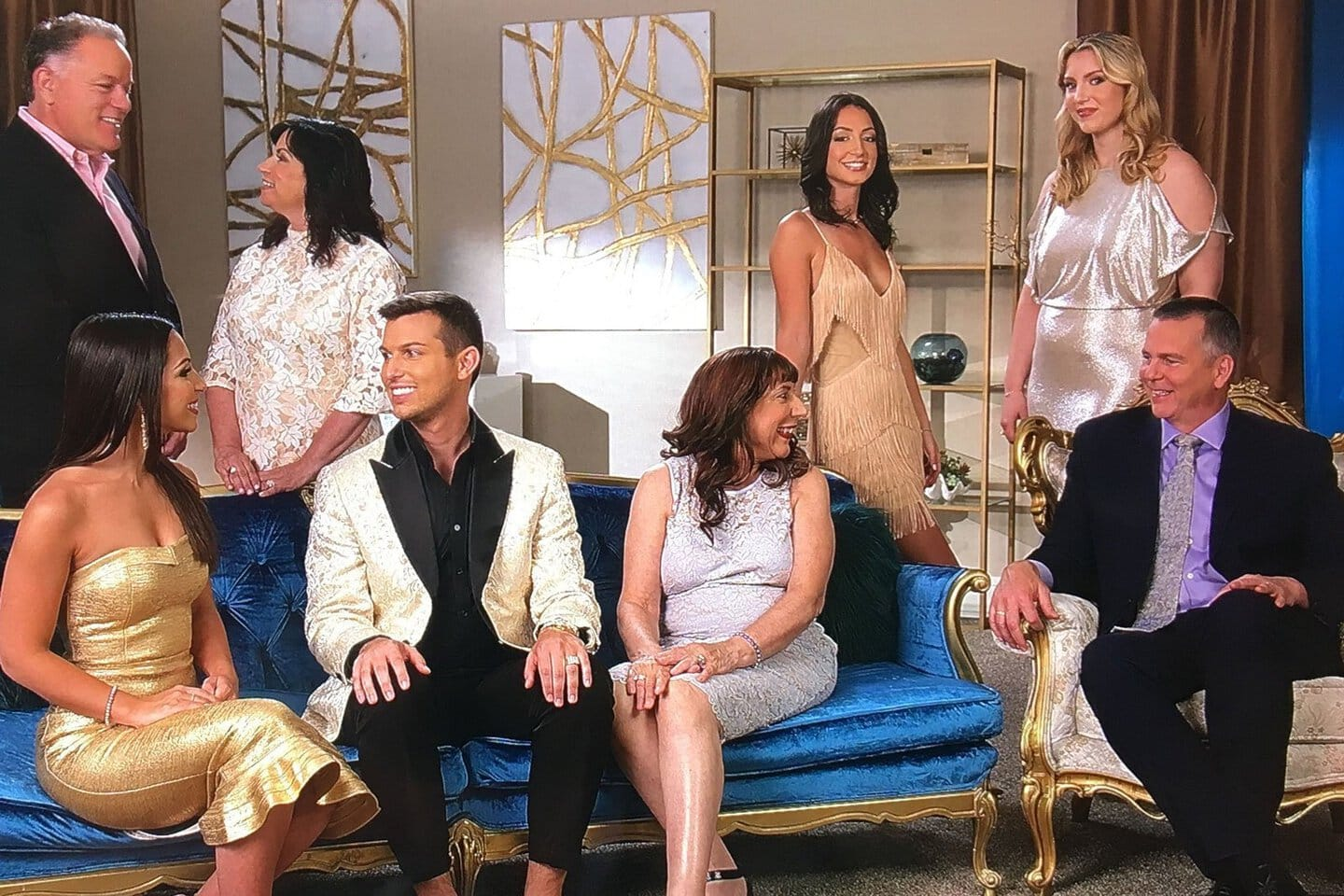
- Genre: Reality
- Starring: Matt Fraser; Alexa Papigiotis; Angela Fraser; Anthony Ciolli; Ava Papigiotis; Maria Fraser; Rod Fraser; Sharon Ciolli
- Country of origin: United States
- Original language: English
- No. of seasons: 1
- No. of episodes: 10

Production
- Executive producers: Mark Burnett; Barry Poznick; Douglas Ross; Alex Baskin; Lisa Tucker; Brian McCarthy; Meredith Prunkard; Jill Dictrow
- Camera setup: Multi-camera
- Production company: Evolution Media

Original release
- Network: E!
- Release: January 13 – March 9, 2020

Meet the Frasers is an American reality television series that premiered January 13, 2020, and airs on E!. The series chronicles the lives of psychic medium Matt Fraser and his pageant queen girlfriend, Alexa Papigiotis.

== Cast ==
- Matt Fraser
- Alexa Papigiotis
- Angela Fraser, Matt's mother
- Rod Fraser, Matt's father
- Maria Fraser, Matt's younger sister
- Sharon Ciolli, Alexa's mom
- Anthony Ciolli, Alexa and Ava's stepfather
- Ava Papigiotis, Alexa's younger sister

== Episodes ==
No.	Title	Original release date	U.S. viewers (millions)
1	"Fraser Fabulous"	January 13, 2020	0.29
2	"Morning Cookie"	January 13, 2020	0.20
3	"Operation Pic Switch"	January 20, 2020	0.23
4	"When Heaven Calls, Matt Fraser Answers"	January 27, 2020	0.17
5	"Psychic vs. Skeptic"	February 3, 2020	0.16
6	"Old Dog, New Tricks"	February 10, 2020	0.15
7	"Matt, Queen of the Ball"	February 17, 2020	0.19
8	"Bling Bling"	February 24, 2020	0.13
9	"Man Girdle"	March 2, 2020	0.10
10	"Will You Marry Me?"	March 9, 2020	0.11
