= Shipwreck Secrets =

American television series on Science Channel

- Country of origin: United States
- No. of episodes: 5

Original release
- Network: Science Channel
- Release: February 9 – March 8, 2020

Shipwreck Secrets is a television series on the American network Science Channel.

== See also ==
- List of 2020 American television debuts
- List of programs broadcast by Science Channel
