= Jamie Sherrill =

American television personality

Jamie Sue Sherill
- Other names: Nurse Jamie
- Occupations: Nurse, TV producer, realty show star
- Known for: Celebrity skin expert, reality television personality on Skin Decision: Before and After

Jamie Sue Sherrill, professionally known as Nurse Jamie, is an American nurse, celebrity skin expert, television executive producer and realty television personality. She is a contributor on Extra and E! News.

== Career ==
Sherrill is the co-owner of Beauty Park Medical Spa in Santa Monica, California. She also has her own line of beauty care products called Nurse Jamie Healthy Skin Solutions.

She is also the executive producer and talent on the American reality television series Skin Decision: Before and After on Netflix. The series was nominated for the Daytime Emmy Award for “Outstanding Lifestyle Series” in 2021.
