= The Busch Family Brewed =

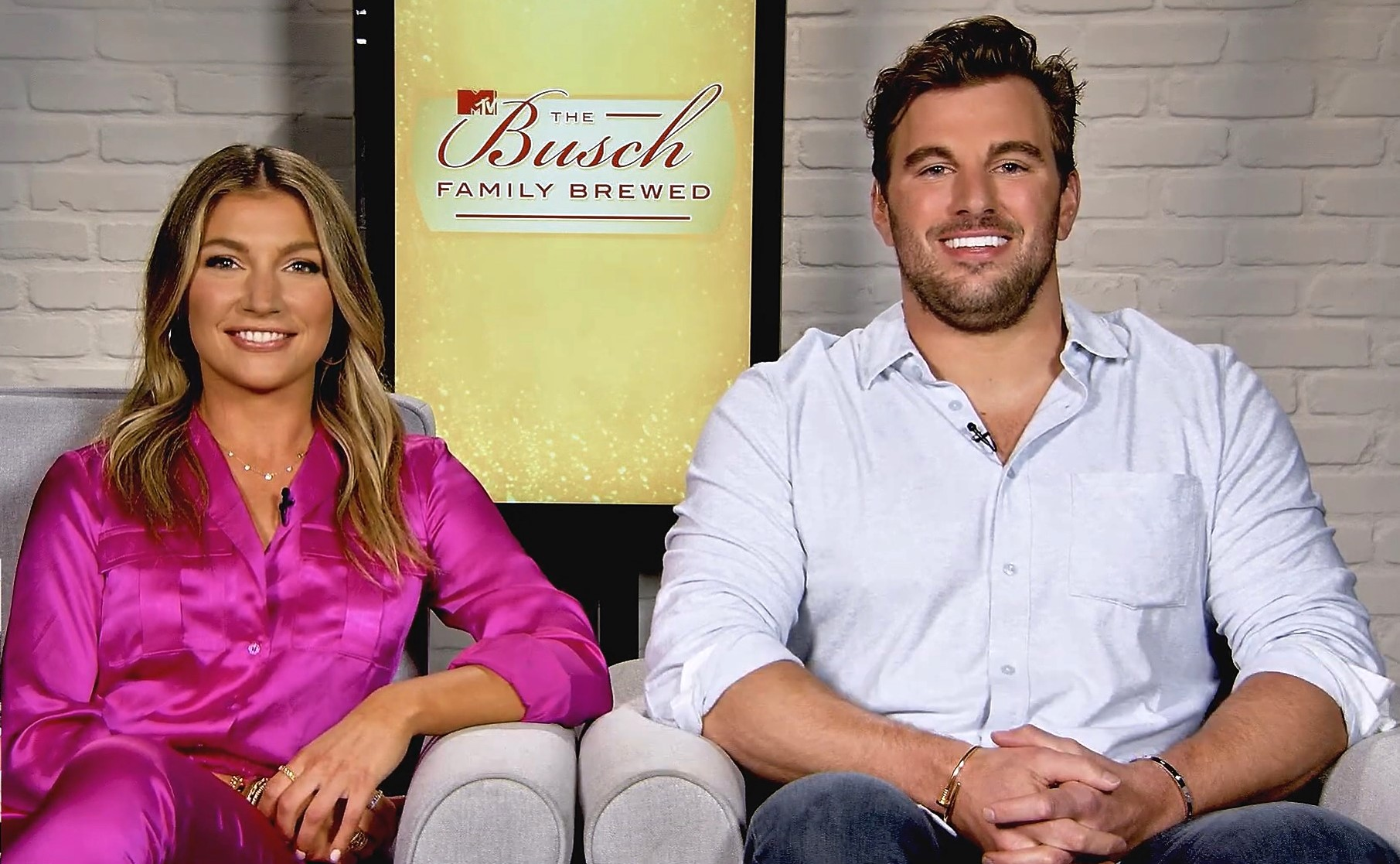
- Haley and Billy Busch in 2017
- Genre: Reality
- Starring: Billy Busch Sr.; Christi Busch; Billy Busch Jr.; Haley Busch; Abbey Busch; Gussie Busch; Grace Busch; Maddie Busch; Peter Busch
- Country of origin: United States
- Original language: English
- No. of seasons: 1
- No. of episodes: 10

Production
- Executive producers: Christian Sarabia; Christopher Costine; Nicole Elliott; Jackie French; Laurie Sharpe
- Camera setup: Multi-camera
- Running time: 20-22 minutes
- Production company: 51 Minds Entertainment

Original release
- Network: MTV
- Release: March 5 – April 2, 2020

The Busch Family Brewed is an American reality television series that premiered on MTV on March 5, 2020. The series chronicles the lives of Billy Busch, great-grandson of Adolphus Busch; his wife Christi; and their seven children ranging in age from 28 to 13: Billy Jr., Haley, Abbey, Gussie, Grace, Maddie, and Peter.

== Cast ==
- Billy Busch Sr.
- Christi Busch
- Billy Busch Jr.
- Haley Busch
- Abbey Busch
- Gussie Busch
- Grace Busch
- Maddie Busch
- Peter Busch
- Jake Fusia
- Marissa Morgan
- Clark Costello

== Episodes ==
No.	Title	Original release date	U.S. viewers (millions)
1	"Meet the Busch Family"	March 5, 2020	0.456
2	"The Sex Talk"	March 5, 2020	0.338
3	"Jake's Makeover"	March 12, 2020	0.322
4	"The Break"	March 12, 2020	0.308
5	"Busch Stadium Club"	March 19, 2020	0.400
6	"Texas Size Drama"	March 19, 2020	0.373
7	"The Morning After"	March 26, 2020	0.401
8	"Gussie's 23rd Birthday"	March 26, 2020	0.323
9	"The Next Steps"	April 2, 2020	0.329
10	"Groundbreaking"	April 2, 2020	0.256
