= Holiday Home Makeover with Mr. Christmas =

- Genre: Reality-TV
- Country of origin: United States
- Original language: English
- No. of seasons: 1
- No. of episodes: 4

Production
- Running time: 35–40 minutes

Original release
- Network: Netflix
- Release: November 18, 2020

Holiday Home Makeover with Mr. Christmas is a 2020 American television series about holiday home makeover. It was released on November 18, 2020, on Netflix.

== Cast ==
- Benjamin Bradley

== Episodes ==
No.	Title	Original release date
1	"Not Your Mother's Christmas!"	November 18, 2020
On the heels of a recent renovation, Patrice and Kalvin ask Mr. Christmas for help, in hope of impressing Patrice's hostess-with-the-mostest mother.
2	"Small Town, Big Christmas"	November 18, 2020
Mr. Christmas heads to West Islip, New York, where firefighter Jeff dreams of a dazzling community firehouse display that will honor his late father.
3	"My Big Fat Italian Christmas"	November 18, 2020
Old traditions meet new beginnings as Danielle hosts her fiancé at family Christmas for the first time. Can Mr. Christmas make it one to remember?
4	"A Tale of Two Holidays"	November 18, 2020
It's all about balance for Mr. Christmas and his elves as Illana and Bob look to the team for seasonal decor that honors both Christmas and Hanukkah.
