= Trial 4 =

True crime documentary miniseries released on Netflix in November 2020

- Promotional poster
- Genre: True crime, Docuseries
- Directed by: Rémy Burkel
- Country of origin: United States
- No. of seasons: 1
- No. of episodes: 8

Production
- Executive producer: Jean-Xavier de Lestrade

Original release
- Network: Netflix
- Release: November 11, 2020

Trial 4 is a 2020 true crime documentary television series directed by Rémy Burkel. It tells the story of Sean K. Ellis, who was unjustly convicted as a teen in the 1993 killing of Boston police officer John J. Mulligan. Ellis fights for his freedom while exposing systemic racism and corruption within the justice system.

The series was released on Netflix on November 11, 2020.

== Episodes ==
No.	Title	Directed by	Written by	Original release date
1	"Chapter 1: Execution-Style Murder"	Remy Burkel	Unknown	November 11, 2020
2	"Chapter 2: Usual Suspects"	Remy Burkel	Unknown	November 11, 2020
3	"Chapter 3: Three Trials"	Remy Burkel	Unknown	November 11, 2020
4	"Chapter 4: Badge Of Shame"	Remy Burkel	Unknown	November 11, 2020
5	"Chapter 5: Hidden Link"	Remy Burkel	Unknown	November 11, 2020
6	"Chapter 6: A Taste Of Freedom"	Remy Burkel	Unknown	November 11, 2020
7	"Chapter 7: Black Irish"	Remy Burkel	Unknown	November 11, 2020
8	"Chapter 8: Worst Case Scenario"	Remy Burkel	Unknown	November 11, 2020
