= Sonia Marciano =

Sonia Marciano is a Clinical Full Professor of Management and Organizations at New York University Stern School of Business. She teaches strategy for the Growth-Focused Business Strategy and the Business and Marketing Strategy Open Enrollment programs for NYU Stern Executive Education. Marciano is also an academic director for the TRIUM Global Executive MBA Program, an alliance of NYU Stern, the London School of Economics and HEC School of Management.

== Biography ==
Prior to joining NYU Stern, Marciano taught Strategy at Columbia Business School and was an Institute Fellow and Senior Lecturer at Harvard University’s Institute for Strategy and Competitiveness. She also was a Clinical Professor of Management and Strategy at Northwestern University’s Kellogg School of Management for eight years, as well as an adjunct professor of strategy at the University of Chicago. Marciano has worked in the consulting, banking, and insurance industries, and has taught executive education courses for companies including Ernst & Young and Abbott Laboratories.

== Books and publications ==
Marciano has written a number of books, papers, and cases.

- Dranove, D. & S. Marciano (2005). Kellogg on Strategy: Concepts, Tools, and Frameworks for Practitioners. Wiley.
- Ghemawat, P. & S. Marciano (2006). De Beers at the Millennium. Harvard Business Publishing.
- Marciano, S. (2008). Strategy Essentials. NYU Stern.
- Marciano, S. Porter, M., and A. Warhurst (2006). De Beers: Addressing the New Competitiveness Challenges. Harvard Business Publishing.
- Wei-Skillern, J. & S. Marciano (2008). Primer on the U.S. Television Industry. Harvard Business Publishing.
- Wei-Skillern, J., S. Marciano, and B. Passy (2008). Mattel's Long Hot Summer. Harvard Business Publishing.

== Education ==
Marciano received her BA with honors, her MBA, and her PhD in Business economics and Industrial Organization, from the University of Chicago.
