= Whose Vote Counts, Explained =

- Genre: Documentary
- Narrated by: Leonardo DiCaprio; Selena Gomez; John Legend
- Country of origin: United States
- Original language: English
- No. of seasons: 1
- No. of episodes: 3

Production
- Running time: 21–25 minutes
- Production companies: Vox Media; Appian Way Productions

Original release
- Network: Netflix
- Release: September 28, 2020

Related
- Explained

Whose Vote Counts, Explained is a 2020 docuseries in Vox Media's Explained franchise. The series is narrated by Leonardo DiCaprio, Selena Gomez, and John Legend.

== Episodes ==
No.	Title	Narrator	Original release date
1	"The Right to Vote"	Leonardo DiCaprio	September 28, 2020
2	"Can You Buy an Election?"	Selena Gomez	September 28, 2020
3	"Whose Vote Counts"	John Legend	September 28, 2020

== Release ==
Whose Vote Counts, Explained was released on September 28, 2020, on Netflix.
