= Murder on Middle Beach =

2020 four-part documentary

- Genre: True Crime
- Directed by: Madison Hamburg
- Opening theme: Fellwalker
- Composer: James Lavino
- Country of origin: United States
- No. of seasons: 1
- No. of episodes: 4

Original release
- Network: HBO
- Release: November 15 – December 6, 2020

Murder on Middle Beach is a four-part documentary by director Madison Hamburg about the unsolved 2010 murder of his mother Barbara Hamburg. It premiered on November 15, 2020, on HBO.

== Production ==
The documentary series began as a student film while Hamburg was in college.

== Episodes ==
No.	Title	Original release date
1	"Mom's Dead"	November 15, 2020
Director Madison Hamburg visits his hometown of Madison, Connecticut and learns more details about his mother's life, and his parents' divorce.
2	"Tables and Rooms"	November 22, 2020
Madison examines his mother and aunt's involvement in the "Gifting Tables" pyramid scheme.
3	"Sisters"	November 29, 2020
Barbara's sister Conway accuses Barbara's daughter Ali of the murder.
4	"Reasonable Doubts"	December 6, 2020
Nearing the 10-year anniversary of his mother's murder, Madison fights to gain access to the police files on the case.

== Reception ==
Ashlie Stevens of Salon remarked that the documentary differed from typical true crime documentaries in its personal story telling, writing "'Murder on Middle Beach' adds to the genre as well. It doesn't have a tidy ending, but grief rarely does. Filmmakers could learn a lot from how Madison Hamburg focuses on the emotional ripple effects of crime, and the very human toll that loss takes on a family and community."

Brian Tallerico of RogerEbert.com also remarked on the series' personal nature, stating "The greatest accomplishment of 'Murder on Middle Beach' is how connected I felt to this story by its end, concerned about an entire family torn apart because of one brutal day, in March over a decade ago."

== Impact ==
In 2020 Anike Niemeyer, who helped produce the documentary, filed a complaint to the Freedom of Information Commission to request the case files on the murder. Madison Police Department contested the complaint, claiming they were close to solving the case and had a suspect. The Freedom of Information Commission ruled in Niemeyer's favour and Niemeyer was given two boxes of records related to the case.

Upon going through the files Niemeyer claimed that not all the files had been released, and Madison Police Department refused to release any further files. Madison Police Department appealed the Freedom of Information Commission's decision through the courts. The Superior Court upheld the decision, and it escalated to the Supreme Court.

The Supreme Court ruled that law enforcement needed to show that there was a reasonable possibility of future action. A case's files could not be kept closed due to law enforcement having a suspect, or the case file being kept open.
