= The Oprah Conversation =

Interview talk show by Oprah Winfrey

- Promotional poster
- Genre: Talk show
- Created by: Oprah Winfrey
- Starring: Oprah Winfrey
- Country of origin: United States
- Original language: English
- No. of seasons: 1
- No. of episodes: 15

Original release
- Network: Apple TV+
- Release: July 30, 2020 – November 5, 2021

The Oprah Conversation is an interview talk show by Oprah Winfrey that premiered on Apple TV+ on July 30, 2020.

== Episodes ==
No. in season	Title	Guest	Original release date
1	"Uncomfortable Conversations with a Black Man: Part 1"	Emmanuel Acho	July 30, 2020
2	"Uncomfortable Conversations with a Black Man: Part 2"	Emmanuel Acho	July 30, 2020
3	"How to Be an Antiracist"	Ibram X. Kendi	August 7, 2020
4	"Bryan Stevenson"	Bryan Stevenson	August 14, 2020
5	"Mariah Carey"	Mariah Carey	September 23, 2020
6	"Caste: Part 1"	Isabel Wilkerson	October 9, 2020
7	"Caste: Part 2"	Isabel Wilkerson	October 9, 2020
8	"Matthew McConaughey"	Matthew McConaughey	October 28, 2020
9	"Stevie Wonder"	Stevie Wonder	November 6, 2020
10	"Dolly Parton"	Dolly Parton	November 13, 2020
11	"Barack Obama"	Barack Obama	November 17, 2020
12	"Amanda Gorman"	Amanda Gorman	March 26, 2021
13	"Eddie Murphy"	Eddie Murphy	April 9, 2021
14	"Elliot Page"	Elliot Page	April 30, 2021
15	"Will Smith"	Will Smith	November 5, 2021

== Production ==
On June 15, 2018, Oprah Winfrey and Apple announced a multi-year partnership, with Winfrey to create exclusive original content for Apple. On March 25, 2019, Apple hosted keynote event at its California campus to announce the new Apple TV+ subscription service. Winfrey appeared onstage to conclude the event, announcing that she would be producing two documentary series, as well as launching a "book club" in partnership with Apple. The book club ended up being a reboot of a segment from The Oprah Winfrey Show titled Oprah's Book Club, which premiered on November 1, 2020, alongside the launch of Apple TV+.

== Release ==
On July 27, 2020, Apple and Oprah Winfrey announced The Oprah Conversation, with the first two episodes airing on July 30, 2020, on Apple TV+, and following episodes released on an irregular schedule.
