= Amy Schumer Learns to Cook =

American cooking show

- Genre: Cooking show; Food reality television
- Starring: Amy Schumer; Chris Fischer
- Country of origin: United States
- Original language: English
- No. of seasons: 2
- No. of episodes: 8

Production
- Executive producers: Amy Schumer; Chris Fischer; Dan Cesareo; Lucilla D'Agostino; Jordana Starr; Faith Gaskins
- Production location: Martha's Vineyard
- Running time: 49 minutes
- Production companies: It's So Easy Productions; Big Fish Entertainment (season 1); Inked Out Productions; DayDream Pictures

Original release
- Network: Food Network
- Release: May 11 – September 7, 2020

Amy Schumer Learns to Cook is an American cooking show starring Amy Schumer and Chris Fischer, which follows Schumer learning to cook from her husband, Fischer, while making cocktails. The series aired from May 11 to September 7, 2020, on Food Network.

In June 2020, the series was renewed for a second season, which premiered on August 17, 2020.

An uncensored version of this show titled Amy Schumer Learns to Cook: Uncensored premiered on January 1, 2021, on discovery+.

== Production ==
In May 2020, Food Network announced that comedian Amy Schumer and her husband Chris Fischer would star in an eight-episode cooking show, Amy Schumer Learns to Cook, which follows the couple cooking in their home kitchen while quarantined during the COVID-19 pandemic. The series was self-shot and also features Schumer donating to Coalition of Immokalee Workers Fair Food Program and domestic violence organizations.

== Cast ==
- Amy Schumer, comedian, wife and mother
- Chris Fischer, chef, husband and father
- Gene, Chris and Amy's baby
- Jane, student from the Philippines serving as nanny and camera operator.

== Episodes ==
Season	Episodes	Originally released	
Season	Episodes	First released	Last released
1	4	May 11, 2020	June 1, 2020
2	4	August 17, 2020	September 7, 2020

=== Season 1 (2020) ===
No. overall	No. in season	Title	Original release date	U.S. viewers (millions)
1	1	"Breakfast Time and Late-Night Eats"	May 11, 2020	0.681
Series premiere. Introduces the series, chef Chris, bartender Amy, son Gene, nanny and cameraman Jane, dog Tatiana, Amy's father Gordon. Amy reveals her years of bartending, Chris reveals his love of fennel. They teach the audience that chocolate is poisonous to dogs. They make latke, old fashioneds, poached eggs, bacon, fennel salad, fried rice, chicken wings, moscows, applesauce, chocolate peanut (sic. almond) butter cup cookies, matzah toast.
2	2	"Lunch Break and Pasta Night"	May 18, 2020	0.770
Remote robocam operator Mike is introduced. Amy introduces her sister Kim, with whom she shares a love of Italian train station speck sandwiches. Chris and Amy make various sandwiches, various salads, pastas. They make speck sandwich, tomato veggie sandwich, verro de tinto, panzanella salad, crustini salad sandwich, crab salad, mushroom sauce spaghetti, tomato sauce spaghetti, brassica spaghetti
3	3	"Taco Night and Movie Night"	May 25, 2020	0.602
Intercom with off-site producer introduced. Amy recommends having sex to alleviate quarantine relationship issues. Amy reveals Chris has won a James Beard Award, Chris reveals Amy has won an Emmy. Chris explains that fish tacos usually use whitefish, such as haddock, seabass, striped bass. Amy and Chris make palomas, guacamole, masa tortillas, al dente rice, shaved cabbage salad, tempura haddock, tempura veggies, sour cream mix. They make tacos. Amy reveals Gene's original middle name was "Attell", before being changed to "Dave", Dave Attell's first name and her father's middle name. Then they make dirty martini, Greek salad dip, crispy potatoes, lamb sliders. Danny DeVito reveals his version of a martini.
4	4	"Brunch and Leftovers"	June 1, 2020	0.593
Amy reveals that Jane is from the Philippines, discusses the robotic cameras around the kitchen. Brunch: They make a peach bellini, scones, pork sausage, eggs sunny side up. Fridge Clean Out: It's time to clean out the fridge. They make a hot toddy, and leftovers. Michael Rapaport checks in remotely. A giant fritatta is made for the local school, with eggs, onions, butter, cooking in the oven for 4 hours. Amy reveals they live in Manhattan when not in quarantine. Warm potato and radish salad with tonnato (tuna) dressing. Mashed potatoes are made, with garlic. Fennel and radish salad with tonnato dressing. Peas and carrots are made, with a dressing of bacon. Amy reveals her learnings during the course of the show for this final episode.

=== Season 2 (2020) ===
No. overall	No. in season	Title	Original release date	U.S. viewers (millions)
5	1	"Fresh, Not Frozen and Kids Menu"	August 17, 2020	0.519
Fresh, Not Frozen: Piña colada; Pigs in a blanket; "celery in a sack" (C-sac): Roasted celery root in crescent roll wrap; Eric Andre guests on videocall; Chris relates tale of when he tried and failed to rescue a sow having a bad litter delivery; Deep-fried potato skins and sour cream and scallion dip; Bacon and cheddar potato skins; Deep-fried empanada size pot stickers, from dough from scratch and filling from scratch, scratch made offscreen, filled and cooked onscreen; with soy sauce based sauce made onscreen; Amy complains about the TV ratings; Kids Menu: Alcoholic coffee; Frozen hot chocolate; Broccoli and ricotta pancake w/butter; "Gene's favorite waffles": frozen waffles + cream cheese & maple syrup; Beef meatballs; Chris eats a caterpillar found in the pot blanching organic kale; Israeli couscous broccoli peas: from frozen peas, premade couscous, cooked broccoli; Jesse Eisenberg guests on videocall
6	2	"Picnic and Unlimited Soup and Salad"	August 24, 2020	0.589
Picnic: Margarita cocktail, from margarita mix base; Pine nut and peanut butter brownies; Pesto pasta salad, with fresh pesto using podolico butter; Jeff Goldblum guests on speakerphone; Gene has become 14 months old; Chicken cutlet BLT sandwich; with previously made chicken cutlets; Celery root watermelon salad w/ ricotta; "Jane Learned to Cook"; Unlimited soup & salad: Home quarantine bad haircut; Fischer Fennel Fanatic Fan Club: F.F.F.C.; Sazerac cocktail; Chris messes up the cocktail shaker shake; Amy's Unique Original Salad (U.O.S.): cabbage (or iceberg lettuce), blue cheese dressing, blue cheese chunks, bacon, carrots, butter lettuce, dill, salt, lemon juice; kale, anchovy, parsley salad; w/ parmesan, olive oil and lemon juice: Chris teaches kale stripping; John Early guests on speakerphone; John officiated Amy and Chris' wedding; Celery root soup with yogurt; a cold soup: boiled celery root, boiled fennel, parsley, yogurt, blended together then refrigerated
7	3	"Takeout Favorites and Finger Foods"	August 31, 2020	0.566
Takeout Favorites: Spaghetti with pomodoro and basil; Chris keeps losing microplanes; Shrimp in lobster sauce; the cooking liquid from the shrimp is thickened to create the lobster-less lobster sauce; Sushi: tuna cone roll, nori-less cut roll; Chris teaches how to deskin fish; Finger Foods: Gin and tonic; how to add ice to a glass, do not put glasses into ice bins; Mini grilled cheese sandwich; Gazpacho; Pizza bagels; John Forté visits
8	4	"Amy's Steakhouse Dinner and BBQ"	September 7, 2020	0.539
Amy's Steakhouse Dinner: Tatiana goes to the vet; Cocktail Bicyclette: white wine, Compari, orange, ice; Skirt steak; marinated with garlic powder and onion powder in soy sauce; Chris finds a slug in the organic shiitake; steak cooked in soy with the shiitake; Sandy Schumer, Amy's mom on speakerphone; her cat Sofia goes to the vet; Creamed spinach and summer squash; with garlic scapes, frozen and fresh spinach, corn cut off the cob, pattypan squash, heavy cream, butter; Cinnamon and sugar bites: a pie crust with cinnamon and sugar coat, with nothing else; making pie crust from scratch; BBQ!: Sofia Schumer, the cat, died (2003-2020); Tati the dog is back; Gene gets his own garden; Watermelon vodka punch bowl: a hollowed out watermelon as a punch bowl/lidded pot; hand blender immersed into the watermelon to blend up the innards, and add vodka and mint; Peperonata: summer squash, roasted red peppers, snow peas, salt, basil, oregano, celery root, olive oil; Pork chops: bone-in porterhouse, marinated with salt, fennel seeds, olive oil, dried thyme, peach, lemon, garlic scapes, flowering thyme; grilled on the BBQ; Artichokes with lemon butter: steamed then grilled; Grilled lobster rolls: grilled rolls with grilled lobster in mayonnaise and lettuce; Possible new season, "Amy Schumer Learned to Cook" or "Amy Schumer Cooks"

== Accolades ==
Year	Award	Category	Nominee(s)	Result	Ref.
2020	Primetime Emmy Awards	Outstanding Unstructured Reality Program	Amy Schumer, Chris Fischer, Dan Cesareo, Lucilla D'Agostino, Jordana Starr and Faith Gaskins	Nominated	
