= Skin Decision: Before and After =

- Genre: Reality show
- Country of origin: United States
- Original language: English
- No. of seasons: 1
- No. of episodes: 8

Production
- Executive producers: David Shaye, Jamie Sherrill, Lauren D. Weber
- Producer: Madison Blakey
- Running time: 32-44 minutes

Original release
- Network: Netflix
- Release: July 15, 2020

Skin Decision: Before and After is a 2020 reality television show streaming television series that will go through the process of cosmetic plastic surgery with two different subjects that would like to change something about themselves in each episode.

== Plot ==
Some patients suffer from violent attacks or road accidents; others from natural deformities such as acne or the physical damage of alcoholism.

== Release ==
Skin Decision: Before and After was released on July 15, 2020, on Netflix.

== Cast ==
- Jamie Sherrill, 8 episodes
- Sheila Nazarian, 8 episodes
- Andrea Garces Lopez, 1 episode
- Katrina M. Goodwin, 1 episode
