= Deaf community in Frederick County, Maryland =

A large deaf community exists in Frederick County, Maryland partly due to the Maryland School for the Deaf, the county's proximity to Gallaudet University in Washington, D.C., and a large number of government jobs. One estimate suggests that as many as 50,000 people in Frederick County and the surrounding area may be deaf or hard of hearing, and that 3,000 people in the city of Frederick may be deaf or hard of hearing. A 2013 census estimated that 8,000 people in Frederick County experience hearing difficulty. An estimated 1.2 million people in Maryland are deaf or hard of hearing and there are more than 75 deaf-owned businesses in Maryland.

== History ==
The Maryland School for the Deaf opened in downtown Frederick in 1867 and is probably a large factor in the reason that Frederick has a large deaf community. In 2020, one resident stated that there is a good chance of someone knowing American Sign Language everywhere she goes.

Movie theaters in the area provide open caption screenings and access to caption-glasses to cater to the deaf community. Open-captioned screenings on blockbuster opening weekends are typically busy.

In 2013, the first deaf mayoral candidate ran in the city of Frederick.

On May 22, 2012, the Maryland General Assembly passed a bill establishing a Task Force to Study the Establishment of a Deaf Culture Digital Library. On May 15, 2014, a bill was signed into law, creating the Deaf Culture Digital Library. In 202, the first virtual summer Read and Learn program for the Deaf Culture Digital Library was hosted by Frederick County Public Libraries. On September 24, 2020, the Maryland State Library officially launched the Maryland Deaf Culture Digital Library.

As of September 2021, there were approximately twenty-six deaf organizations in Frederick County, including the American Deaf Cornhole Club, a South Asian Deaf organization, the Eastern Motorcycle Club for the Deaf, the Free State Chapter of Gallaudet University Alumni Association, and an organization for deaf and hard-of-hearing seniors.

== Education ==
Maryland School for the Deaf was established in 1867 as the Maryland Institution for the Deaf and Dumb. The school operates a campus in Frederick which serves approximately four hundred students. From birth until the age of 21, the school provides free, public education for deaf and hard-of-hearing Maryland residents. The Maryland School for the Deaf was featured in the film Audible, which was nominated for Best Documentary Short at the 94th Academy Awards.

== Businesses ==
In Maryland, there are more than 75 deaf-owned businesses. There are more than ten deaf-owned businesses in the city of Frederick and the Maryland Governor's Office reported that, of Maryland deaf and hard of hearing business owners, Frederick County has the largest percentage at 35 percent.

== Maryland Deaf Community Center ==
Twenty-two deaf organizations in Frederick County joined to create the Maryland Deaf Community Center (MDCC), a nonprofit which opened on October 16, 2021, and was located in the Aircraft Owners and Pilots Association in the city of Frederick. Over five hundred people attended the opening of the center. The MDCC is the first deaf community center in the state of Maryland. In February 2022, the MDCC had to move out of the building due to a lack of funding.

== Religion ==
Frederick Church of the Brethren Deaf Fellowship Service began in 1971 and had approximately 100 members in 2018. The Table Church is another deaf congregation in Frederick. Deaf Calvary Church in Walkersville, Maryland, caters exclusively to deaf people.

== Accessibility issues ==
There is a need for increased housing in Frederick in order to allow graduating students of the Maryland School for the Deaf to remain in the area.

== Notable members ==
- Nico DiMarco, disc jockey
- Nyle DiMarco, model and actor
- Alexa Paulay-Simmons, cast member of Deaf U
- Tessa Lewis, cast member of Deaf U

== See also ==
- Frederick County, Maryland
- Maryland School for the Deaf
- Deaf culture
