= LEAD-K =

American deaf education organization

The Language Equality and Acquisition for Deaf Kids (LEAD-K) campaign is a grassroots organization. Its mission is to work towards kindergarten readiness for deaf and hard-of-hearing children by promoting access to both American Sign Language (ASL) and English. LEAD-K defines kindergarten readiness as perceptive and expressive proficiency in language by the age of five. Deaf and hard-of-hearing children are at high risk of being cut off from language, language deprivation, which can have far-reaching consequences in many areas of development (e.g., cognitive development, socio-emotional wellbeing, academic outcomes). There are a variety of methods to expose deaf and hard-of-hearing children to language, including hearing aids, cochlear implants, sign language, and speech and language interventions such as auditory/verbal therapy and Listening and Spoken Language therapy. The LEAD-K initiative was established in response to perceived high rates of delayed language acquisition or language deprivation displayed among that demographic, leading to low proficiency in English skills later in life.

The general mission of the group is to promote the use of American Sign Language by deaf and hard-of-hearing children as early as possible. It has been met with a wide variety of responses, including pushback from organizations and families that promote listening and spoken language for deaf children. The pushback exists due to this flawed research where it used an inappropriate methodology to show that children who receive cochlear implants and appropriate therapy tend to learn language at the same level as their hearing peers.

== Approach ==
The LEAD-K organization approaches the goal of equal language access in two primary ways: by providing information and statistics on the language skills of Deaf and hard-of-hearing children, and working with other groups to change public policy at the state level.

=== Awareness ===
There are a number of materials that have been published by LEAD-K providing information about different aspects of language acquisition and education of Deaf and hard-of-hearing children. These include fact sheets summarizing current statistics on English proficiency, definitions of language development milestones, and clarifications of common misconceptions. There is also an active social media campaign, mainly on the social media platform Facebook, through which the organization shares information on these subjects and interacts with other individuals and groups as they respond to LEAD-K action.

=== Legislation ===
The LEAD-K organization has published an official model legislation to be followed by states currently pursuing action, which includes a number of guidelines and stipulations for both schools and parents. As stated by the organization, the goal of these guidelines are to ensure sufficient language skills in children entering the education system by promoting access to both ASL and English. The model consists of two parts with a total of 12 subsections, which outline the procedures that states may follow to establish and assess language development milestones and approach the education of Deaf and hard-of-hearing children.

== State action ==
As of May 11, 2018, according to Sheri Ann Farinha, LEAD-K director and CEO of Norcal, an agency that provides services to Deaf people in California, the states of California, Hawaii, Kansas, Oregon, South Dakota, Georgia, Louisiana, and Michigan have signed versions of a LEAD-K bill. Rhode Island, Mississippi, New Hampshire, West Virginia, Missouri, Alabama, and Texas have rejected versions of the bill.

The national LEAD-K campaign team works with individual states to create national campaign state teams, composed of local educators, parents, and other community members. These volunteers reach out to the community and legislative members in an effort to gain support for the bill. The purpose of state teams is to tailor the bill to the existing educational legislation of a given state, and assist in efforts to promote the bill on a local scale.

Thirty states have national campaign state teams including Alabama, Arizona, California, Colorado, Delaware, Georgia, Hawaii, Idaho, Illinois, Iowa, Kansas, Massachusetts, Nevada, New Hampshire, New York, Ohio, Pennsylvania, Rhode Island, Texas, Utah, Virginia, Washington, and West Virginia.

== Responses ==
The LEAD-K initiative has been met with both support and opposition. Several national groups have issued critical responses to the LEAD-K initiative. Such organizations include the AG Bell Association for the Deaf and Hard of Hearing, the American Speech-Language-Hearing Association (ASHA), and the American Cochlear Implant Alliance (ACI Alliance).

=== Support ===
==== Nyle Dimarco ====
Nyle Dimarco is an American actor, model, dancer, and Deaf community activist. He is currently the official celebrity spokesperson for LEAD-K. Dimarco supports the educational and legislative efforts of the LEAD-K organization in interviews and social media outreach, as well as through the Nyle Dimarco Foundation.

==== NAD ====
The National Association of the Deaf (NAD) has partnered with LEAD-K since the 2016 NAD annual conference, where they named it one of the association's top five priorities. The NAD has stated that it agrees with the goals of the LEAD-K organization, and has since commenced efforts to spread awareness of the legislation and the organization itself.

==== NBDA ====
As of March 12, 2018, the National Black Deaf Advocates (NBDA) association has partnered with LEAD-K in promoting the bill. They have voiced support for the legislation and have launched informational campaigns on their website and on social media.

=== Opposition ===
==== AG Bell ====
The Alexander Graham Bell Association for the Deaf and Hard of Hearing, an organization that promotes the Listening and Spoken Language (LSL) communication for deaf children and adults, has historically not supported initiatives that advocate utilizing sign language as the primary means of communication for deaf and hard of hearing people. In September 2017, LEAD-K published an open letter to the AG Bell Association stating concern over the contentious relationship between the Association and LEAD-K, as well as the Deaf community at large. In communication following the letter, the two groups agreed to hold a meeting in October 2018. As a result, the groups agreed on amendments to the model legislation intended to ensure that the information provided to parents of deaf and hard-of-hearing children regarding communication options and language milestones is complete and unbiased.

==== ASHA ====
In an official response to the LEAD-K initiative, the American Speech-Language-Hearing Association states its opposition to the proposed legislation which it deems redundant. ASHA's response emphasizes the right of parents to choose language modality for their children, with the establishment of a comprehensive information resource for parents and educators. ASHA also recognizes the authority of existing state-established agencies responsible for the creation of Individualized Education Programs (IEPs) to protect parents' rights and services to children, which LEAD-K advocates the reconfiguration of.

==== ACI Alliance ====
Following an open letter addressed to the American Cochlear Implant Alliance published in February 2019 by the LEAD-K organization, the ACI Alliance penned a response expressing disagreement with the legislative goals of LEAD-K. The response also establishes the Alliance's position supporting the early introduction of cochlear implants and the role of family choice in regards to language modality. The letter states opposition to LEAD-K on several issues, primarily the level of importance of ASL access to the language development of deaf and hard-of-hearing children.

== See also ==
- Language acquisition by deaf children
- Deaf education
- Kindergarten readiness
