= America's Next Top Model: Guys & Girls =

America's Next Top Model: Guys & Girls may refer to:

- America's Next Top Model (cycle 20), the first Guys & Girls theme
- America's Next Top Model (cycle 21), the second Guys & Girls theme
- America's Next Top Model (cycle 22), the third Guys & Girls theme
