= Hessian Barracks =

Historic barracks building in Frederick, Maryland

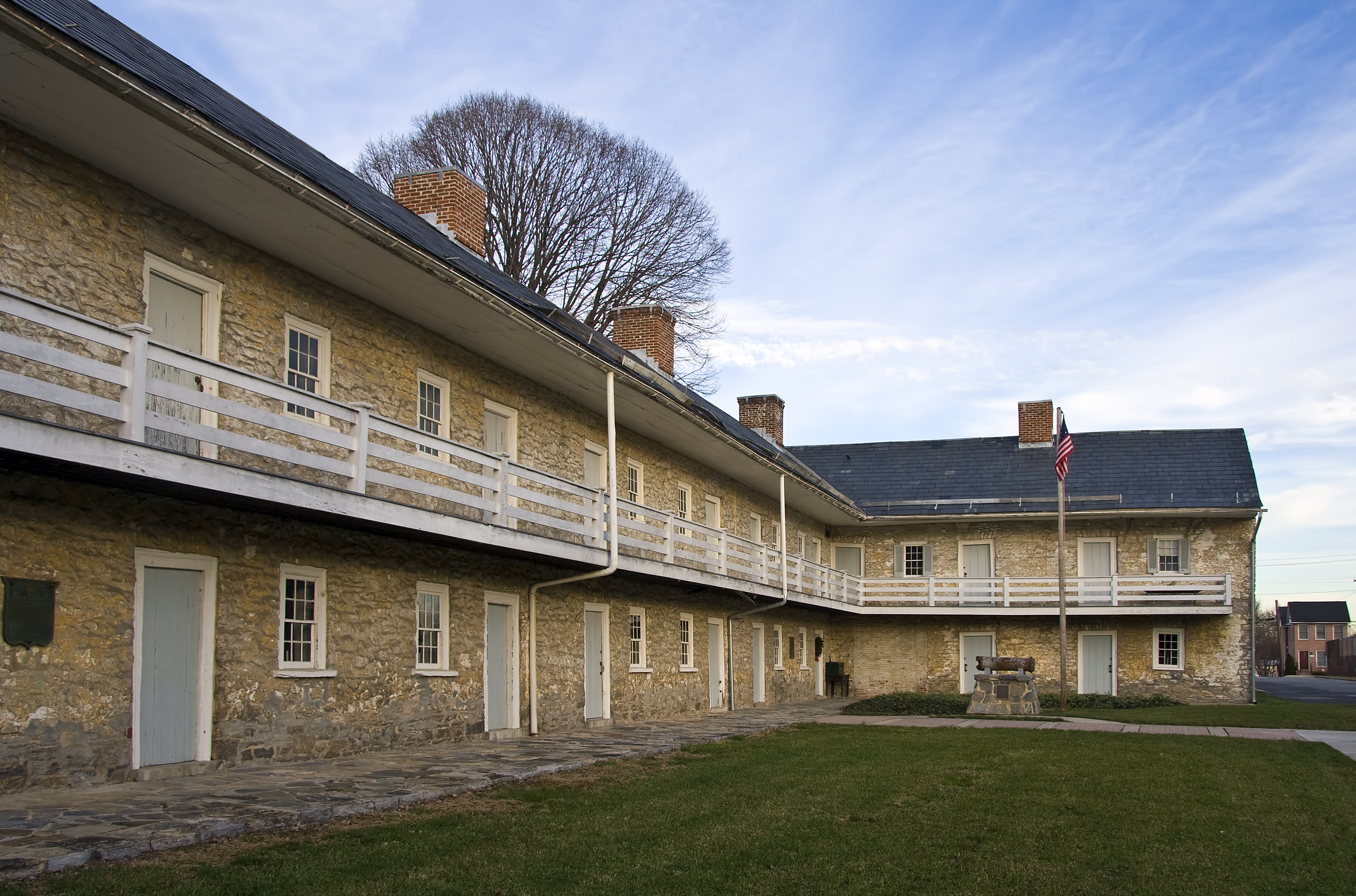
- Main façade of the Hessian Barracks

- Location within Maryland Location within the United States
- Former names: Frederick Barracks
- Alternative names: Revolutionary Barracks

General information
- Architectural style: Georgian
- Location: 242 S. Market St., Frederick, Maryland, United States
- Coordinates: 39°24′32.5″N 77°24′33.8″W
- Current tenants: Maryland School for the Deaf
- Construction started: 1777
- Completed: 1781
- Demolished: 1871 (partially)
- Client: State of Maryland
- Owner: State of Maryland

Technical details
- Material: Stone, wood
- Floor count: 2
- Grounds: 4 acres (1.6 ha)
- Hessian Barracks
- U.S. National Register of Historic Places
- NRHP reference No.: 71000373
- Added to NRHP: January 25, 1971

Hessian Barracks, formerly known as Frederick Barracks, is an historic barracks building located in Frederick, Maryland. The State of Maryland contracted to build a barracks in the summer of 1777, but it was not completed until 1781. There were two L-shaped buildings built on the site, but one was demolished in 1871. The building is a two-story stone structure with gallery porches and a gable roof. Hessian Barracks was listed on the National Register of Historic Places in 1971.

== History ==
During the American Revolutionary War (1775–1783), the buildings and grounds were used to house British and German prisoners of war. The barracks were put to a variety of uses during the 19th century including a state armory, silkworm production site, and military hospital after the nearby Battle of South Mountain and subsequent Battle of Antietam in September 1862. The parade field served as the Agricultural Fairgrounds from 1853 to 1860. In 1867, it was chosen as the site for the Maryland Institution for the Deaf and Dumb (present-day Maryland School for the Deaf). The western barracks building was demolished in 1871 for the construction of a new Victorian style large central school building, which in turn was razed in the late 1960s, and replaced by individual brick cottages.

== See also ==
- National Register of Historic Places listings in Frederick County, Maryland
