= Nico DiMarco =

American disc jockey

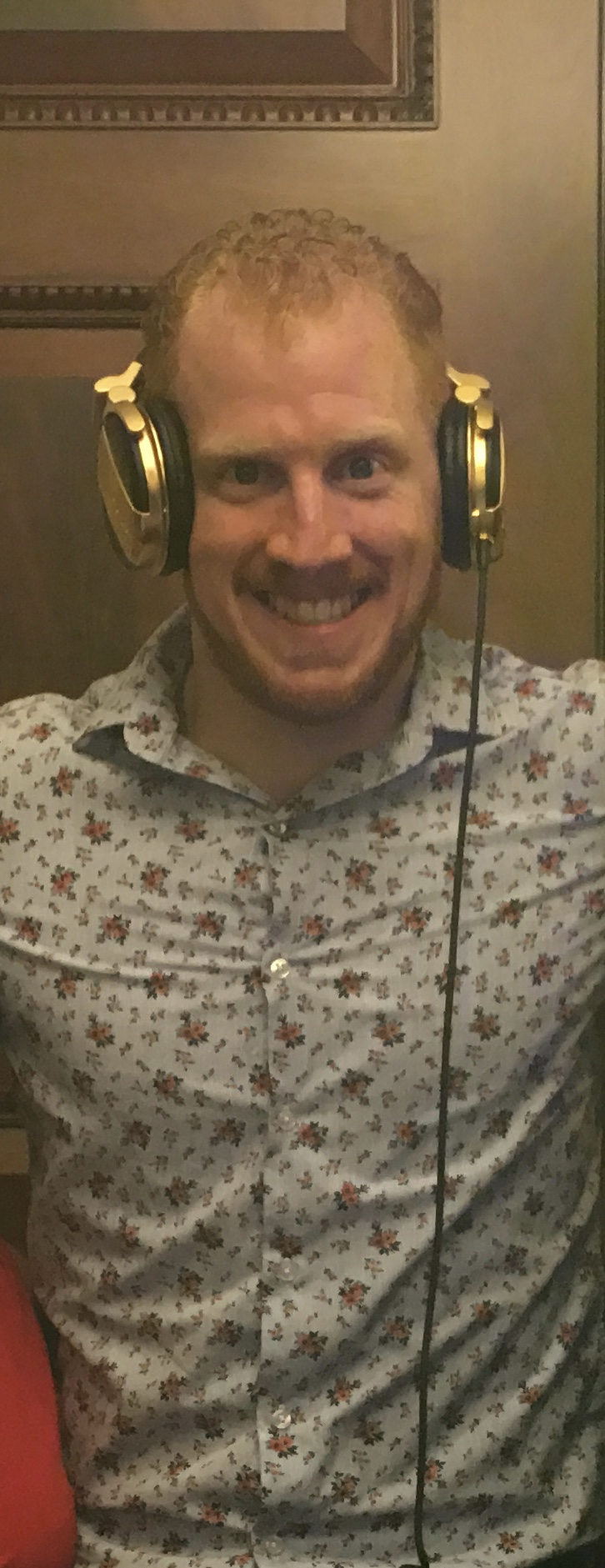
- DiMarco in November 2017
- Born: Nico Thompson; May 8, 1989 (age 37); Queens, New York, U.S.
- Education: Gallaudet University
- Occupation: DJ

Nico DiMarco is a deaf DJ. He is also identified as the fraternal twin brother of America’s Next Top Model winner Nyle DiMarco.

== Early life and education ==
DiMarco was born into a family familiar with deafness, as he is a fourth-generation Deaf individual and one of 25 Deaf individuals in his family. He is of English, Scottish, Italian and German descent. During his youth his mother moved the family around frequently as she wanted to locate the best deaf education for her children. The family moved first to Texas and later to Frederick, Maryland. After settling in, both Nico and his sibling Nyle attended the Maryland School for the Deaf, before going on to attend Gallaudet University in Washington D.C., where he graduated in 2012.

Nico has remained in D.C. throughout his life to date. He currently both resides and works in the city.

== Musical career ==
DiMarco did not initially have much exposure to music and after being exposed, became interested by the beats as he is unable to hear most music. He also accessed lyrics by reading along or through memorization. His family was at first skeptical about his interest but eventually DiMarco's parents purchased some speakers in order to help him feel the music's beat and make music more accessible to him at home.

He began working as a Deaf DJ while at Gallaudet University. After graduation DiMarco took a job as an IT specialist for the U.S. government while continuing to work as a DJ part-time. DiMarco has stated that he has found success with Deaf audiences but that there is currently no market for Deaf music. He further noted that Deaf DJs work in the music business alongside hearing people and that in order for Deaf people to excel in the music and DJing industry they must "practice and listen to the music more often than hearing people do. It just takes some extra time”.

DiMarco prepares for events by reading the lyrics of songs, which allows him to match the rhythm to the words more effectively. When playing at an event DiMarco utilizes various methods such as ASL interpreters or typing out his conversations to ensure accessible communication. He has stated that hearing is not necessary for a person to be able to enjoy music.
