= Leah Katz-Hernandez =

American government official

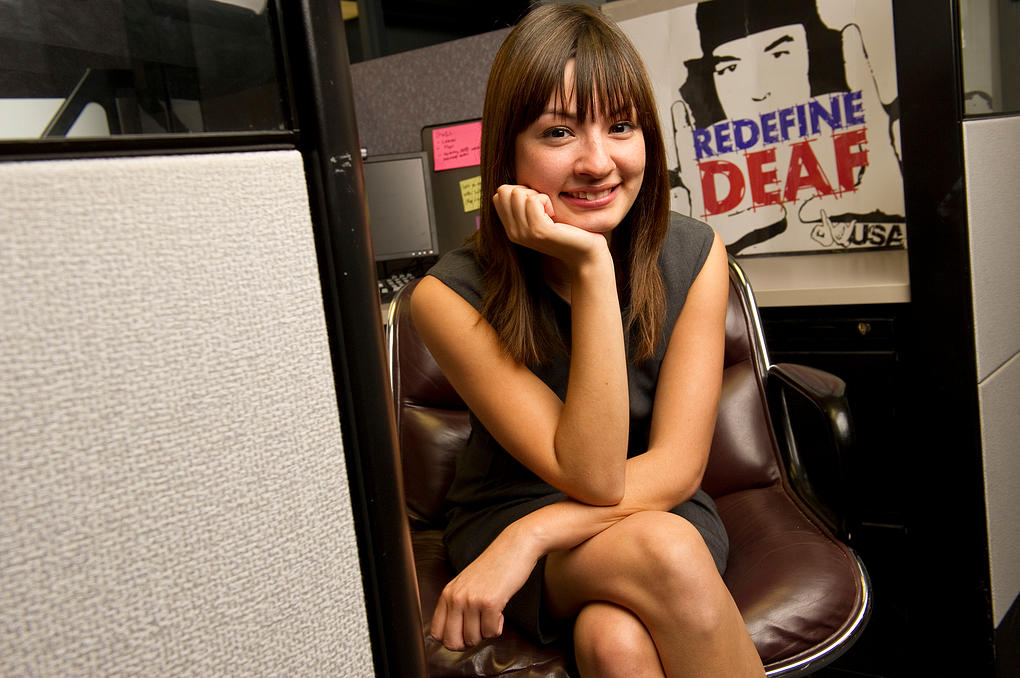
- Education: Gallaudet University(BA); American University (MA)
- Occupations: Communications professional and inclusion advocate Former Receptionist of the United States
- Employer(s): Microsoft (Current); Executive Office of the President of the United States (Former)

Leah Katz-Hernandez is a communications professional and inclusion advocate. She was the first deaf person to serve as Receptionist of the United States.

== Biography ==
Katz-Hernandez attended the American School for the Deaf and the Maryland School for the Deaf. She earned a Bachelor of Arts degree in Government from Gallaudet University in 2010 and a Master of Arts degree in Strategic Communication from American University in 2016.

She was a volunteer for President Obama's first presidential campaign in 2008 and an intern for his re-election campaign in 2012.

Katz-Hernandez worked as First Lady Michelle Obama's press assistant and research associate after which she served as Receptionist of the United States making her the first deaf person to hold this position.

As of 2021, Katz-Hernandez is Manager of CEO Communications for Microsoft.
