= Nyle DiMarco =

American model, actor, and activist

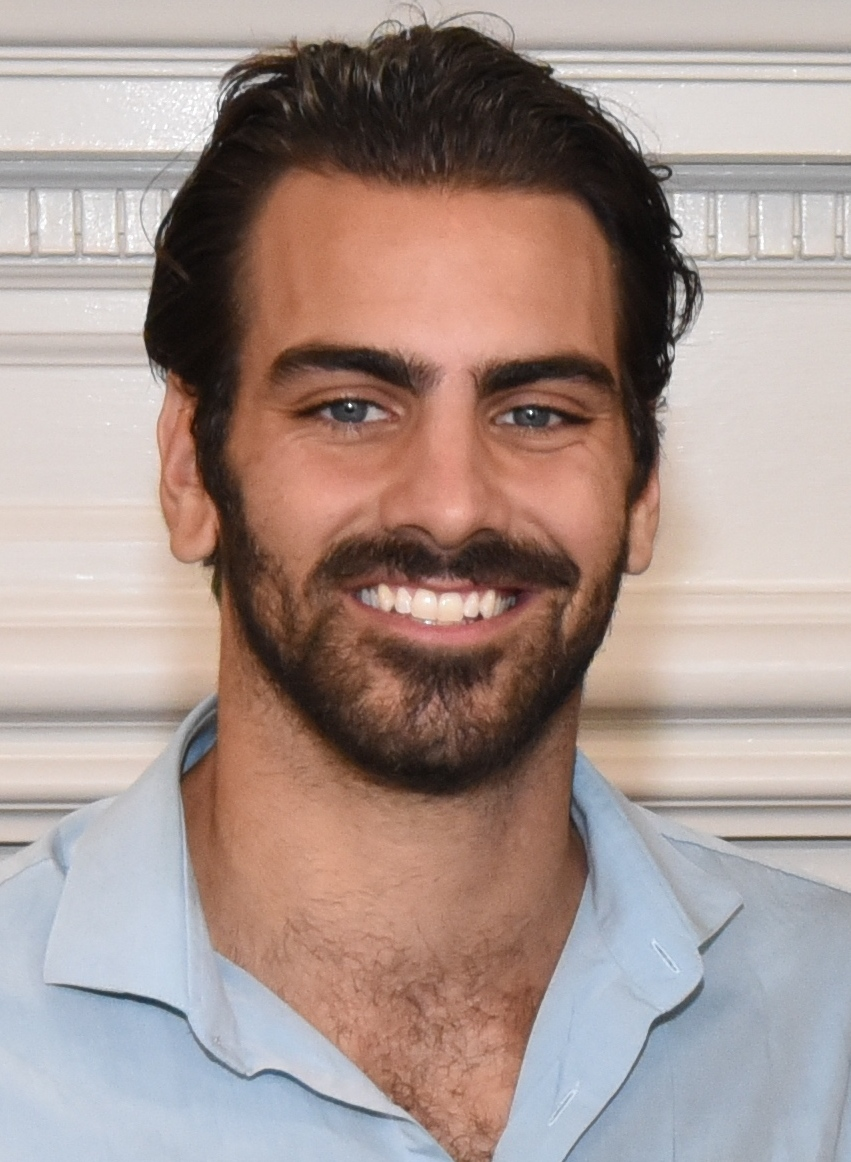
- DiMarco in 2016
- Born: Nyle Thompson; May 8, 1989 (age 37); Queens, New York, U.S.
- Education: Gallaudet University
- Occupations: Model; actor; author; Deaf activist
- Years active: 2014–present
- Modeling information
- Height: 6 ft 2 in (1.88 m)
- Hair color: Dark brown
- Eye color: Blue
- Agency: Wilhelmina Models (New York), CESD Talent Agency (Los Angeles)
- Website: nyledimarco.com

Nyle DiMarco (born May 8, 1989) is an American model, actor, producer, and Deaf and LGBTQ activist. In 2015, DiMarco was the winner of The CW's reality television series America's Next Top Model in season 22, becoming the second male winner and the first Deaf winner. In the following year, he and professional dance partner Peta Murgatroyd were the winners of the ABC televised dance competition Dancing with the Stars in season 22. He is also the author of Deaf Utopia.

== Early life ==
DiMarco was born in Queens, New York, as Nyle Thompson, explaining in his book that along with his brothers, he changed his last name from Thompson to DiMarco, his mother's maiden name, while at university. He is of English, Scottish, Italian and German descent. DiMarco grew up in Frederick, Maryland, where he attended the Maryland School for the Deaf, and went on to graduate from Gallaudet University in 2013, with a degree in mathematics. American Sign Language (ASL) is his native language but he uses English fluently in writing. He has a fraternal twin brother, Nico, who is also Deaf, and an older brother, Neal.

== Career ==
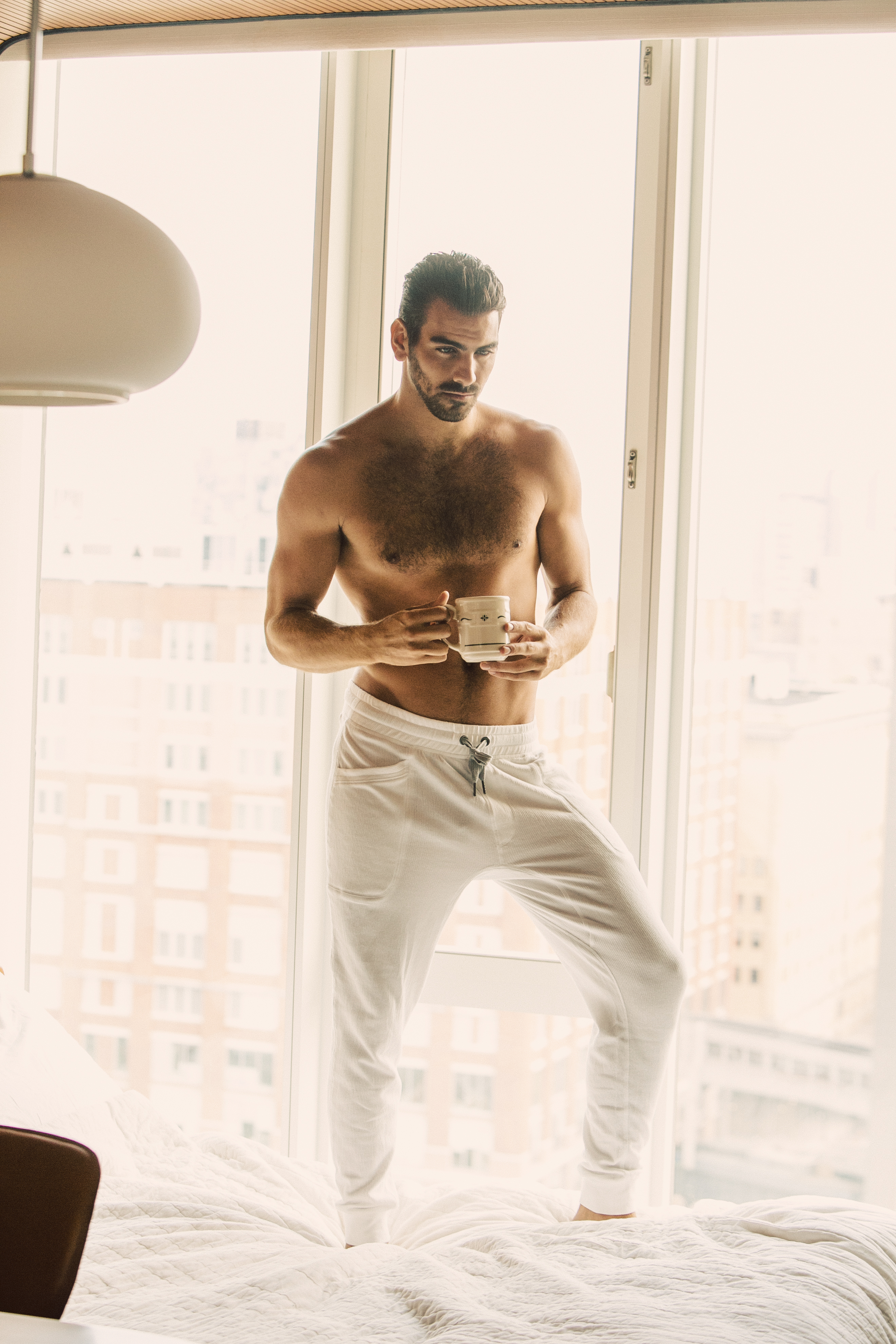
DiMarco in 2015 for 2(x)ist

In 2013, DiMarco had a leading role in the independent film In the Can, an American Sign Language Films production. In 2014 and 2015, he played the recurring role of Garrett Banducci in Switched at Birth on the Freeform network.

DiMarco was doing freelance modeling for about a year before he was contacted by America's Next Top Model producers in 2015. They scouted him via social media without realizing he was deaf but readily agreed to provide interpretation during the interview process. He was named the winner of the season over Mamé Adjei in the season finale. He is the only Deaf man in the show's history, the first Deaf winner, and the second male contestant to win.

Shortly after winning the competition, DiMarco signed with Wilhelmina Models in New York City.

On March 8, 2016, DiMarco was announced as one of the celebrities who would compete on season 22 of Dancing with the Stars. He was partnered with professional dancer Peta Murgatroyd. DiMarco is the second Deaf contestant to compete on the show after Marlee Matlin. On May 24, 2016, DiMarco and Murgatroyd were announced as the winners of the season. DiMarco became the first Deaf celebrity to win any global version of BBC Worldwide's Dancing with the Stars franchise.

In 2016, DiMarco appeared in the Hulu comedy series Difficult People. Later on, he appeared on Tóc Tiên's music video for "Big Girls Don't Cry" in January and Alex Newell's music video for "Basically Over You (BOY)" in March.

In June 2016, DiMarco walked for Giorgio Armani at Milan Fashion Week Spring/Summer 2017.

DiMarco was honored as DEAF LIFE Magazine's "Deaf Person of the Year" (January 2017 issue). He was also interviewed for and featured on the cover of ABILITY Magazine in the Nyle DiMarco Digital Issue (#191).

Additionally, DiMarco played the lead role in Dan + Shay's "Tequila" music video, which premiered in February 2018.

In 2025, he made his directorial debut with Deaf President Now! which was distributed with Apple TV. The film is presented as a documentary focusing on the 1988 protests at Gallaudet University. He was subsequently nominated for 2 Primetime Emmy Awards for Outstanding Documentary or Nonfiction Special and for Outstanding Directing for a Documentary/Nonfiction Program.

== Personal life and activism ==
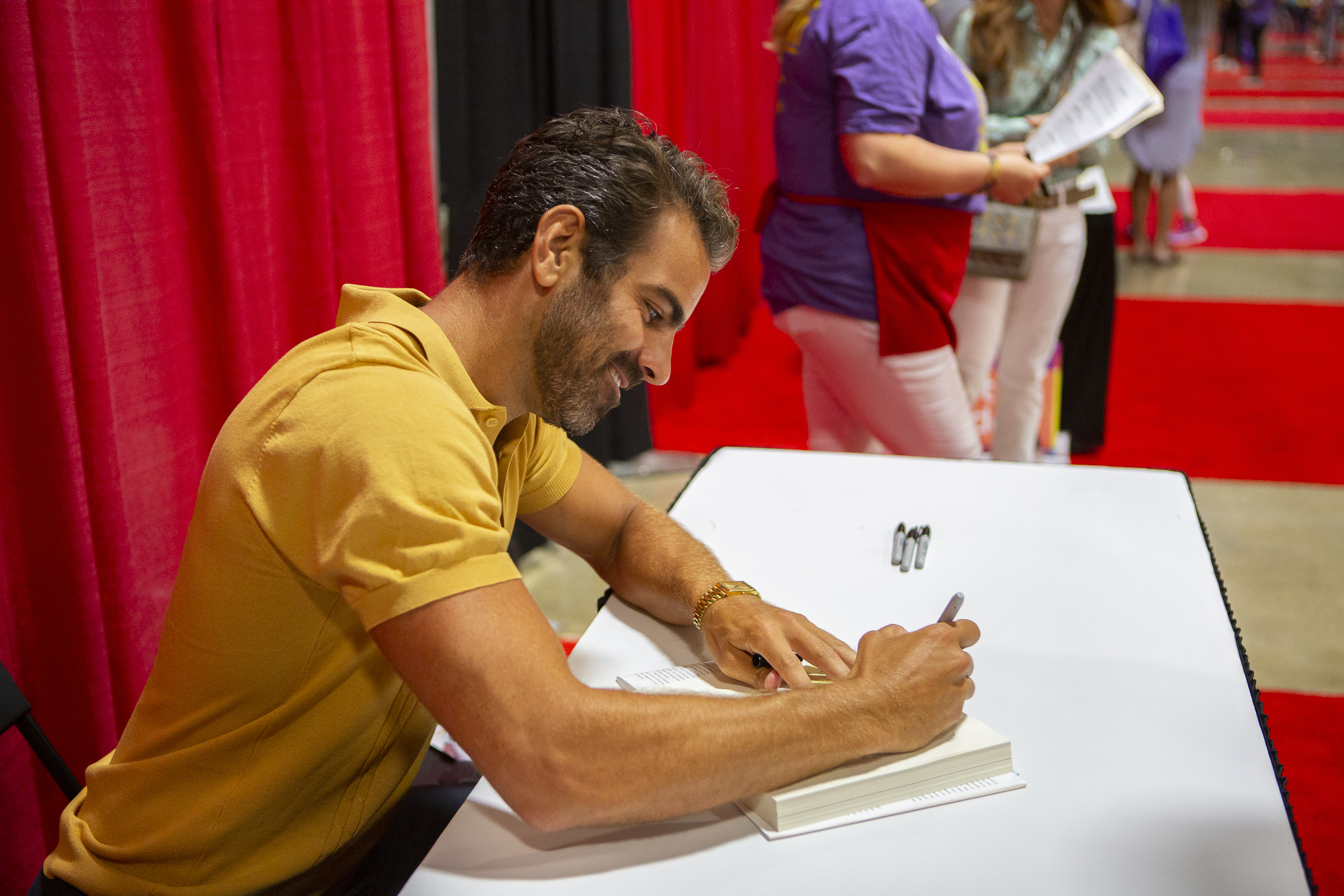
DiMarco at the National Book Festival in 2022

DiMarco identifies as queer. He has openly discussed his private and public journey of understanding his sexual identity. Before queer became his identity of choice, he used the term sexually fluid. He has interviewed with Out about using his platform to encourage ongoing support for LGBTQ and Deaf activism. On Sept 26, 2018, he delivered the keynote address for Deaf Awareness and Pride Week at the University of Louisville.

DiMarco is an advocate for disabled and Deaf communities and sees his media profile as an opportunity to bring awareness to Deaf culture. He views Deafness as an advantage in modeling because he is accustomed to communicating without speaking. He believes deaf actors should play deaf roles.

DiMarco is a spokesperson for LEAD-K (Language Equality and Acquisition for Deaf Kids). He is also a signer and creative collaborator on The ASL App, an app that teaches ASL.

In 2016, DiMarco started The Nyle DiMarco Foundation, a non-profit organization providing access to resources for deaf children and their families.

DiMarco supported Hillary Clinton's presidential campaign during the 2016 U.S. election. He criticized Republican nominee Donald Trump, after reports surfaced of ableist comments, one directed at deaf actress Marlee Matlin. DiMarco stated, "[T]here are 55 million disabled people living in America. I don't want a president who marginalizes my community."

On November 22, 2020, DiMarco delivered the keynote address at the closing general session of the Annual Convention and Expo of the American Council on the Teaching of Foreign Languages. In the keynote address, DiMarco drew comparisons between his experiences in education (both in Deaf schools and in hearing schools) and the experiences of learners of world languages negotiating cultural differences. Due to the COVID-19 pandemic, the conference was fully online, so DiMarco delivered the keynote via video streaming.

In 2022, DiMarco published Deaf Utopia, a memoir which chronicles his experience as a Deaf person in the United States and connections to the international deaf community, referencing personal and global histories of deaf people's ability to thrive and ongoing need for support and inclusion in a world that is largely determined by hearing people.

== Filmography ==
=== Cinema ===
Year	Title	Role	Notes
2025	Deaf President Now!		Director and producer

=== Television ===
Year	Title	Role	Notes
2014–15	Switched at Birth	Garrett Banducci	3 episodes
2015	America's Next Top Model	Himself	Cycle 22; winner
2016	Difficult People	Doug	Episode: "Kessler Epstein Foundation"
2016	Dancing with the Stars	Himself	Season 22; winner
2018–19	This Close	Ben Genovese	4 episodes
2019	Station 19	Dylan	Episode: "Into the Wildfire"
2019	What Would You Do?	Himself	Season 15
2020	Deaf U	—N/a	Netflix original reality series; executive producer
2021	Audible	—N/a	Netflix short documentary film; executive producer
2022	Queer as Folk	Leo	Season 1, Episode 4
2026	All's Fair	Jay Wilson	Episode: "Liberty Unleashed"

=== Music video appearances ===
Year	Title	Original artist(s)	Director(s)
2016	"Big Girls Don't Cry"	Tóc Tiên	Đinh Hà Uyên Thư
2016	"Basically Over You (B.O.Y)"	Alex Newell	Alex Newell & Derec Dunn
2018	"Tequila"	Dan + Shay	Patrick Tracy
2019	"7 Rings (ASL Version)"	Ariana Grande	Jake Wilson
2020	"I Dare You (ASL Version)"	Kelly Clarkson (in collaboration with Deaf West Theatre)	Trevor Joseph Newton

== Accolades ==
Award	Date of ceremony	Category	Recipient(s)	Result	Ref.
Critics' Choice Real TV Awards	June 21, 2021	Best Unstructured Series	Deaf U	Won	
Critics' Choice Documentary Awards	November 14, 2021	Best Short Documentary	Audible	Nominated	
Primetime Emmy Awards	September 6, 2025	Outstanding Documentary or Nonfiction Special	Deaf President Now!	Nominated	
Primetime Emmy Awards	September 6, 2025	Outstanding Directing for a Documentary/Nonfiction Program	Deaf President Now!	Nominated	

Preceded by Keith Carlos	America's Next Top Model winner Cycle 22 (2015)	Succeeded by India Gants
Awards and achievements
Preceded by Bindi Irwin & Derek Hough	Dancing with the Stars (US) winners Season 22 (Spring 2016 with Peta Murgatroyd)	Succeeded by Laurie Hernandez & Valentin Chmerkovskiy
