= Rodney Burford =

American actor (born 1991)

- Born: Rodney Burford Jr. 1991 (age 34–35); Brooklyn, New York, United States
- Education: Maryland School for the Deaf; Gallaudet University
- Occupation: Actor
- Years active: 2020–present

Rodney Burford (born 1991) is an American actor, best known for his portrayal of Tony Hughes in the Netflix drama Dahmer - Monster: The Jeffrey Dahmer Story, which premiered in September 2022.

== Early life and education ==
Rodney Burford Jr. was born in Brooklyn, New York. He attended Maryland School for the Deaf, before studying at Gallaudet University, a private federally chartered research university in Washington, D.C. for the education of the deaf and hard of hearing.

== Career ==
In 2020, Burford made his screen debut in the reality television show Deaf U.

In 2022, Burford guest starred as Tony Hughes, one of serial killer Jeffrey Dahmer's victims, in the 10-part Netflix crime drama series Dahmer - Monster: The Jeffrey Dahmer Story. Amanda Whiting, writing for The Independent, described Burford's portrayal as "played with heartbreaking warmth" and praised the episode ("Silenced") in which he features predominantly.

== Personal life ==
Burford is partially deaf, and has cochlear implants which help him to understand spoken language.

== Filmography ==
Year	Title	Role	Notes
2020	Deaf U	Himself	8 episodes
2022	Dahmer - Monster: The Jeffrey Dahmer Story	Tony Hughes	3 episodes
