= Kindergarten readiness =

Development of a child's ability to adapt to kindergarten

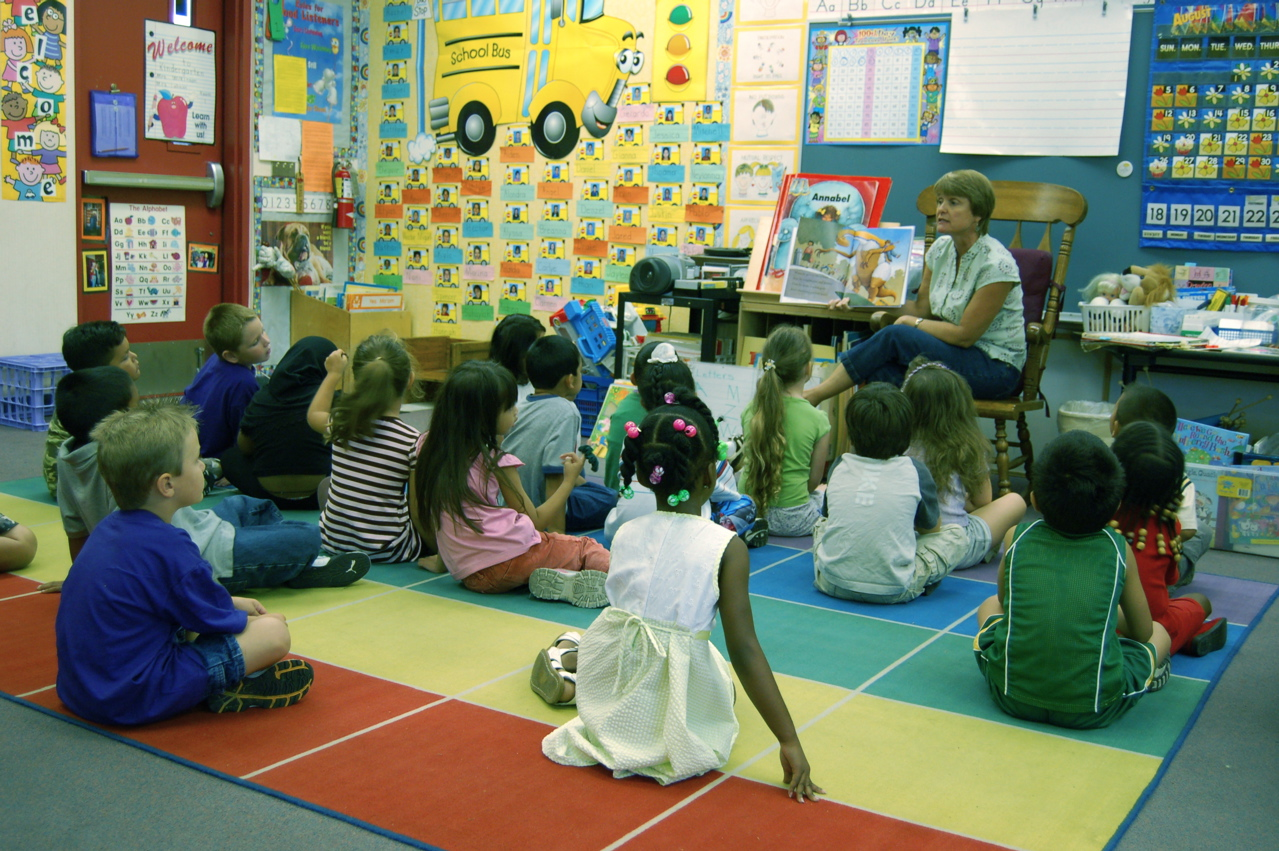
American Kindergarten students listening during story time

Kindergarten readiness refers to the developmental domains that contribute to children's ability to adapt to the kindergarten classroom, which is often a new and unfamiliar environment. There is no single agreed upon definition of kindergarten readiness. The domains often included in the definition comprise: academic skills (e.g., early literacy and mathematics understanding, etc.), social-emotional development (e.g., self-regulation, pro-social behaviour, etc.), and physical development (e.g., motor development, sensory development, etc.). In addition to these competencies, the child's environment and opportunities for learning should also be considered. This includes the child's home environment and their interactions with teachers and peers.

== Academic skills ==
When assessing children's readiness for kindergarten, much of the discussion is focused on the emergence of basic academic skills, including reading, writing, and arithmetic, which are commonly referred to as the “three Rs” (United States Department of Education, 2001). This is likely because upon entering kindergarten, academic skills—such as literacy and numeracy—predict later academic success.

=== Reading ===
Reading is an important skill, as reading ability during primary school predicts academic achievement and later success. Therefore, particular emphasis is usually placed upon the development of literacy skills for preschool and kindergarten students to prepare them for the future. Children are not expected to read upon entering kindergarten. However, they are expected to have phonemic and phonological awareness, as well as a knowledge of print. Phonemic awareness is the first step in learning to read; it refers to the ability to hear and manipulate the smallest forms of language known as phonemes. Phonemic awareness, upon entering kindergarten is the strongest predictor of reading success. Once a child understands phonemes, the next step is to develop phonological awareness, which is the ability to recognize that there is a relationship between sounds and letters, and letters and words. Phonological awareness strongly predicts the development of literacy skills. Upon entering kindergarten, children should also be able to recognize their own name in print, know how to handle a book, recognize letters, and identify words that rhyme. These are all predictors of literacy success.

Another important aspect of reading development is the understanding of narrative structures, which lends to better comprehension skills. Vocabulary development is closely associated with comprehension skills; those with weaker vocabularies may have difficulties following narratives.

=== Writing ===
Upon entering Kindergarten, children typically make attempts to write their own name and letters that have been dictated, and are able to master some of the letters (NCLD, Pianta). In order to write letters, children must be able to integrate auditory information (what sound the letter makes) and orthographic skills (knowledge of letters and print convention). Children's developing ability to write letters is related to later literacy outcomes such as reading compression and spelling (Pianta). However, during the transition into Kindergarten, the primary focus in terms of relevant writing skills involves the physical ability to draw (i.e., motor skills). Kindergarten aged students can typically draw pictures of themselves and their families and use a variety of different sized lines and shapes in their drawings (NCLD).

=== Arithmetic ===
In general, children are expected to have knowledge of numbers to demonstrate kindergarten readiness. Children generally should be able to count to at least 10, count about 5 objects, demonstrate knowledge of adding or taking away objects, and identify basic shapes, such as triangles, circles, and squares (NCLD, 2006). Recent studies in Australia have suggested that children know much more mathematics than kindergarten teachers would expect upon beginning kindergarten. In general, children should demonstrate problem-solving, spatial reasoning, and calculation abilities. Children engage in nonverbal calculation at early ages; however the transition from nonverbal to verbal calculation does not take place until approximately five and half years of age (Mix, Huttenlocher, & Levine, 2002). Therefore, preschool children, including those entering kindergarten, should have a sense of quantitative reasoning. The transition to verbal problem-solving does not occur until they become familiar with conventional symbols (p. 112).

Mathematical knowledge during preschool predicts later school success. However, preschool and kindergarten students in low-income settings have been shown to have significantly less developed mathematical skills than students from middle-income homes. As such, particular attention has been given to developing math interventions.

== Social emotional well-being ==
The transition to Kindergarten often requires children to adapt to a new and different environment. This can be a difficult transition for some children as they must learn to meet new social demands. This new environment is typically more structured and filled with more prolonged social engagement than their home environment. Children use their social and emotional abilities in order to navigate this new and unfamiliar environment. Although social and emotional skills are sometimes not included in definitions of Kindergarten readiness, focus groups surveys indicate that teachers often advocate that developed social skills are more important than academic skills as children enter school. Social skills function as tools to help children learn more quickly and promote peer acceptance, contributing to a more positive outlook on school.

=== Social and emotional development ===
Between the ages of 3-6, children undergo dramatic development in their social and cognitive abilities. The development of these skills provides them with the tools to navigate the social context of a kindergarten classroom. These developments become obvious during children's social interactions that transform from playing alongside of their peers, to more complex and coordinated play amongst peers. This transformation in social abilities comes about not only from an increase in language abilities, and increasing self-regulation abilities, but also from the quickly developing ability to consider other people's perspectives. Perspective taking allows children to take into account others’ points of view, and to appreciate that others’ points of view may be different from their own. This ability develops rapidly between ages 3–6 and continues to develop throughout adolescence. Not only is it important for children entering kindergarten to be able to take into account their peers’ points of view, it is also important for them to be able to consider their teacher's perspective

The ability to consider others’ perspectives also gives way to the development of social empathy. Children begin to appreciate that other people can experience emotions that are different from their own, and that their actions towards others can affect their emotions. This developing understanding, paired with their increasing self-regulation abilities, enables children to interact and develop meaningful relationships, as well as the ability to successfully manage conflicts.

In addition to promoting positive peer relationships, successfully managing the social environment of the kindergarten classroom also contributes to more positive academic outcomes. Through more positive social interactions, children are better able to access the resources that they need to thrive in the classroom setting. For example, if the child is able to appropriately and effectively interact with the teacher, the child is more likely to receive assistance and attention when necessary. Additionally, if the child is able to engage and participate with their peers, it is more likely that they will be included and form more meaningful relationships, thereby associating school with positive experiences.

=== Parent's role ===
Children's development does not occur in a vacuum. They are constantly being influenced by the environments that they are surrounded by. At the same time, children's behaviors and reactions have an effect on their environments as well. During the preschool years, children spend the majority of their time surrounded by their immediate family. Therefore, the family environment will significantly influence how a child develops during this age period. Therefore, parents play an important role concerning their child's readiness for the kindergarten classroom. In fact, children have better academic skills when their relationship with family is characterized as warm, accepting, involved and when parents value education (Hill, 2001). Furthermore, parent-child interactions that are structured and responsive are positively related to school readiness.

A key aspect in this type of parent-child interaction is being sensitive to the child's skill level in order to provide the appropriate amount of support when guiding the child's learning. This type of guidance is known as scaffolding, in which the level of support given to the child decreases as the child's skill level increases on a given task. Just as scaffolding around a building is removed as the building gets nearer to completion, the amount of help that is provided to the child decreases as the child begins to master a certain task. The decreasing amount of support allows the child to have more autonomy which gives them the opportunity to practice their newly developing skills. Scaffolding can be implemented in any type of learning, but is especially helpful in the preschool age-range to teach about conflict resolution in social settings, emotion regulation, and problem solving.

=== Teacher's role ===
When children enter Kindergarten, they experience a shift from the family acting as a primary influence on the child's development, to an increased influence from their classroom environment. An important factor that contributes to how well a child adapts to the Kindergarten environment is his/her relationship with the teacher. When children form a close relationship with their teacher, they appear better adjusted within the kindergarten context compared to when a conflicting relationship is developed. Children feel more comfortable approaching their teacher, as well as expressing their thoughts and feelings when a warm and open relationship is developed. This allows the child to effectively use the teacher as a means for support. This support can come in the form of social, emotional, or academic assistance which ultimately contributes to promoting the child's opportunities for success in the Kindergarten classroom.

The teacher-child relationship has also been shown to be affected through intervention strategies. For example, the Chicago School Readiness Project trained teachers in classroom behavior management strategies in order to promote greater emotional support in the classroom. Children in classrooms whose teachers’ received the intervention showed better self-regulation, fewer behavior problems, and better academic skills compared to children in classrooms whose teachers had not received the training. Further, Barbarin et al. (2010) studied home-to-school matches and mismatches. They found a positive correlation between home-school matches and children’s kindergarten readiness when parents and teachers matched on “child-centered beliefs”. Improvement is seen in areas of social behaviors but also extends to academic skills.

== Motor and sensory development ==
Upon entering kindergarten, most children should have passed certain developmental milestones in their motor and sensory development. Fine motor development, which involves manipulating small objects and forming pencil grips are necessary for the development of other academic skills. For example, by age five, children usually possess the fine motor skills to allow them to print some letters, draw a person with a head, a body, legs, and arms, as well as other shapes, such as triangles, squares, and circles. Similarly, they can also manipulate scissors to cut a straight line, use a fork and knife effectively, and tie their shoelaces. Fine motor skills upon entering kindergarten are associated with academic performance in reading and writing in later grades (QLSCD 1998-2010), as well as academic achievement in mathematics.

Developmental milestones for gross motor development include learning to skip, catching a ball, jumping over small objects, and walking down stairs using alternate feet and a handrail. The peak period of development for motor skills occurs from birth to age five. As such, children entering kindergarten can walk, run, jump, and climb and are developing control of their bodies.

Sensory developmental milestones are also used as indicators of kindergarten readiness. For example, by age five, children should know their colors, count using their fingers, manipulate a book and read it from left to right, and draw pictures that represent animals, objects, or people.

== Oral language development ==
Oral-language development involves the development of receptive language, which is the ability to understand when spoken to, and expressive language, which is the ability to produce language. Kindergarten readiness requires development in both. For example, students are expected to have a vocabulary of approximately 2000 words by age five; Canadian Language & Literacy Research Network, 2009). Similarly, they are expected to be using approximately five to eight words in a sentence. In general, however, children entering kindergarten are expected to understand instructions and communications from adults and peers (Pivik, 2012). They are also expected to communicate their needs and ideas in a way that can be understood by others. Simply stated, they must be able to use language as a tool to be functional within the kindergarten setting.

Oral language is of particular importance for children entering kindergarten as it is a predictor and necessary requirement of literacy development (Hill, 2011). However, the transition from oral-language development to literacy is not clearly defined and hierarchical. Rather, it is a multidimensional and complex transition (p. 52). Nevertheless, oral language development provides the framework and opportunity for children to develop literacy skills. Children are able to build upon their previously mastered oral skills or vocabulary to help them learn new skills, such as reading or writing.

Oral language can be taught explicitly and implicitly through play. For example, dramatic play can allow for the child to take on different roles and use language as a tool in different contexts (Hill, 2011). Play also has a positive impact on literacy, self-regulation, and social-understanding (Van Reet, 2012). For example, play is strongly related to language development in the form of procedural knowledge, such as how to apply proper grammar, which occurs through observation and exposure, as opposed to direct instruction (p. 20).

== Inhibitory control and attention ==
In order to learn and engage in a classroom environment, children must be able to direct their attention effectively. Specifically, children need to be able to extract the important messages from the surrounding noise or distractions. Adults are much more adept at blocking out distracting information in their environment compared to children. Therefore, the distractions that might impact a child's ability to focus his or her attention may be difficult for an adult to appreciate. Distractions can present themselves in the form of auditory sounds, such as other children talking in the classroom, noise from a television, cars driving by outside, etc. However, visual information can also be distracting to children, hindering them from properly focusing their attention. For instance, if a child is attempting to concentrate on a given task in a room where there are many interesting things around her, the abundance of visual information will make it harder for her to concentrate on the task at hand. The more distractions that are present in the child's environment, the more effortful it will be for the child to effectively focus her attention.

Another important aspect of learning involves the ability to discern what is relevant from what is not. In everyday conversation, we are continuously picking out the important parts of what is being said in order to commit the relevant information to memory. This skill is particularly important for children to be able to learn and follow instructions in a classroom environment. When young children listen to someone speaking, such as instructions from a teacher, it is important for them to be able to pick out the important information so that they are able to do what has been asked.

Another area in which children often show difficulty is engaging in a new task. This is a necessary skill in kindergarten given the continuous switching of activities that happens throughout the day. Many children have little trouble focusing on a particular activity, but when asked to switch, have difficulty on the next. This can decrease their performance on the new task, or hinder their ability to learn from it.

The cognitive ability that is implicated in these situations is known as inhibitory control (IC). Inhibitory control is known as the ability to inhibit a predominant (or initial) response, and instead respond with a more appropriate action. This term is used somewhat interchangeably with related terms such as, self-regulation, effortful control, attentional control, etc. However, the divide between the terms is not substantive (Allan et al. 2014).

The preschool age marks a time of rapid development of inhibitory control, and not surprisingly, plays an important role in children's adjustment to kindergarten. Although there is marked development, the relationship between IC and other developmental outcomes (e.g., academic, social, etc.) remains intact. Inhibitory control is important in many aspects of kindergarten readiness but is particularly relevant to children's academic outcomes. Although IC is implicated in both literacy and math skills, is it particularly important for math.

IC has been measured using a variety of methods. Namely, researchers typically use behavioral methods, in which children are asked to complete short tasks that require the use of IC. Researchers also use reports in the forms of surveys from parents and teachers. Typically, behavioral methods and teacher reports have the closest relationship to children's academic outcomes. Both of these methods can reveal important information when investigating the relationship between IC and academic performance as they lend information from different contexts, with behavioral methods providing information about the child's objective abilities, and teacher reports providing information about the subjective classroom experience. Together these methods provide a more complete understanding of the relationship.

An important consideration is that difficulties that children may have in regards to focusing their attention becomes amplified when they are experiencing strong emotions. It is also important to rule out physical problems (hearing and vision) as they may present themselves as an attention problem but can be easily remedied with heading or visual aid

== At-risk children ==
There are four key risk factors that are associated with educational disadvantages upon entry into kindergarten in the United States. They include having a mother with less than a high school education, living in a family that receives food stamps or welfare, living in a single-parent home, and having parents whose native tongue is other than English (United States Department of Education, 2001). Individuals with a single risk factor are likely to lag in reading or writing skills; those with multiple risk factors have a 50% chance of scoring in the bottom quartiles in reading, mathematics, or general knowledge. For example, those with multiple risk factors are less likely to know the alphabet or be able to count to 20 before beginning kindergarten, which puts them at a disadvantage in comparison to other students without risk factors (p. 21). Families who live in poverty are generally less able to provide learning opportunities, such as books or toys to their children. Lack of school readiness has been linked with later school dropout. However, longitudinal studies in Quebec suggest that social-emotional and social skills training can help some students improve their academic paths and eventually graduate from high school.

Parents and family environments can play a protective role against the risk of educational disadvantage. In fact, the home and family environments have the greatest impact on whether or not a child is ready to begin school (Pivik, 2012). For example, parents have many roles in preparing children for kindergarten, including providing the child with proper nutrition, health care, and opportunity for growth. Families can also act as advocates, teachers, and providers for their children.

== New types of learning ==
Recent discussions have moved from the traditional focus of developing the “three R’s” to considering skills that are inherent to the digital age. For example, through exposure to tablets, children are learning traditional skills in new ways. As opposed to manipulating books and toys, many children spend their time learning via technology. Literacy apps, videos, and games are most commonly used. However, the manipulation of the iPad itself lends to a different type of motor development than traditional paper instruction, such as swiping, touching, and tapping (Burnett & Daniels, 2016). Nevertheless, children may have similar interactions when reading with adults using tablets as they might when using printed materials (Burnett & Daniels, 2016).

Many efforts by large television networks has been directed at developing media content for pre-schoolers with the aim of fostering healthy social-emotional development (Nikolayev, Clark, & Reich, 2016). However, the online games that are targeted for social-emotional development among pre-school students are mostly focused on recognition of one's own emotional skills, relationships with adults, cooperative play with peers, or formation of self-identity (Nikolayev, Clark, & Reich, 2016). Most games also focus on modeling appropriate social behavior as opposed to having children practice their own skills through the game.

== Assessment ==
The Kindergarten Behavior and Academic Competency Scale (KBACS):

The KBACS is a questionnaire that is completed by a child's teacher in order to assess the child's readiness for school. The teacher rates the child across a variety of domains such as following classroom rules, completing work, etc. using a 5-point scale (ranging from poor to excellent). Studies have shown that the KBACS is associated with other measures of school readiness, and has excellent test-retest reliability (intraclass correlation coefficient = .82; Granziano et al. 2015).

The Bracken School Readiness Assessment (BSRA):

The BSRA is a widely used kindergarten readiness test that measures a child's exposure to concepts that support learning at school. It contains five subtests assessing knowledge of colors, letters, numbers/counting, size/comparisons, and shapes. Unlike a questionnaire, the BSRA is structured as a set of tests to be completed with the child. The BSRA is used in some public and private schools to determine eligibility for gifted and talented programs. Studies have shown that children's scores on the BSRA are predictive of their later academic outcomes (Panter & Bracken, 2009).

The Early Development Instrument (EDI):

The EDI is a questionnaire that is completed by a child's teacher. It was designed to measure children's school readiness and has been described as a holistic, or multidimensional approach as it includes measures outside of the academic domain. It contains 104 items and measures five domains including, physical health and well-being (e.g., gross and fine motor skills, physical independence, etc.), social competence (e.g., responsibility and respect, approaches to learning, etc.), emotional maturity (e.g., proocial behavior, hyperactivity and inattention, etc.), language and cognitive development (e.g., basic numeracy, basic literacy, etc.), and communication skills and general knowledge (e.g., ability to communicate needs, ability to tell a story, etc.) (Janus & Offord, 2007). Studies have shown that the EDI is a good predictor of children's early school achievement, especially with children on the extreme ends of the rating scale (i.e., exceptionally low scores or exceptionally high scores.) (Boivin & Bierman)

The Diagnostic Screening Test of School Readiness – Revised

The Diagnostic Screening Test of School Readiness is commonly known as the Lollipop test and is a measure of school readiness that focuses on academic components of readiness. It contains four subtests including, identification of colours and shapes and copying shapes, spatial recognition, identification of numbers and counting, and identification of letters and writing. These subtests are administered to a child individually. The test was designed to be quick and easy to administer and studies have shown that children's scores on the Lollipop test are associated with other measures of school readiness, and is predictive early school achievement (Chew 1987, Boivin & Bierman).
