= Maryland School for the Deaf =

Public school in Maryland, United States

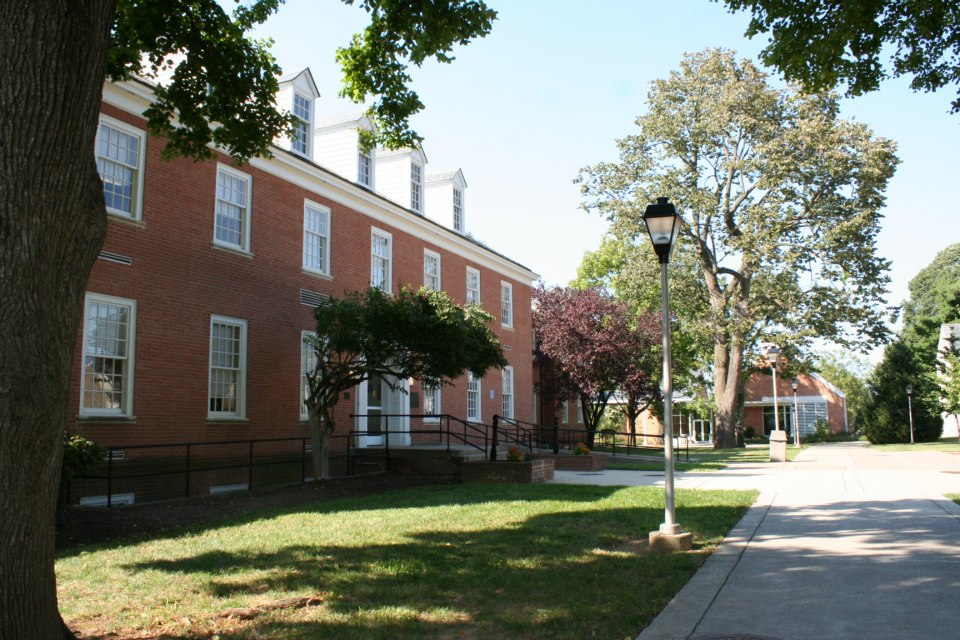
- A snapshot of Ely Building and a new cafeteria in background

Location
- Frederick, Maryland; United States; 39°24′31″N 77°24′38″W

Information
- Type: Public
- Established: September 1868
- Superintendent: John A. Serrano
- Faculty: 100+
- Grades: K–12
- Enrollment: 500+
- International students: 2
- Language: American Sign Language, English
- Colors: Orange and Black
- Athletics conference: Eastern Schools for the Deaf Athletic Association, Maryland Independent Athletic Conference
- Mascot: Orioles
- Publication: The Maryland Bulletin
- Alumni: Nyle DiMarco
- Website: www.msd.edu
- Hessian Barracks
- U.S. National Register of Historic Places
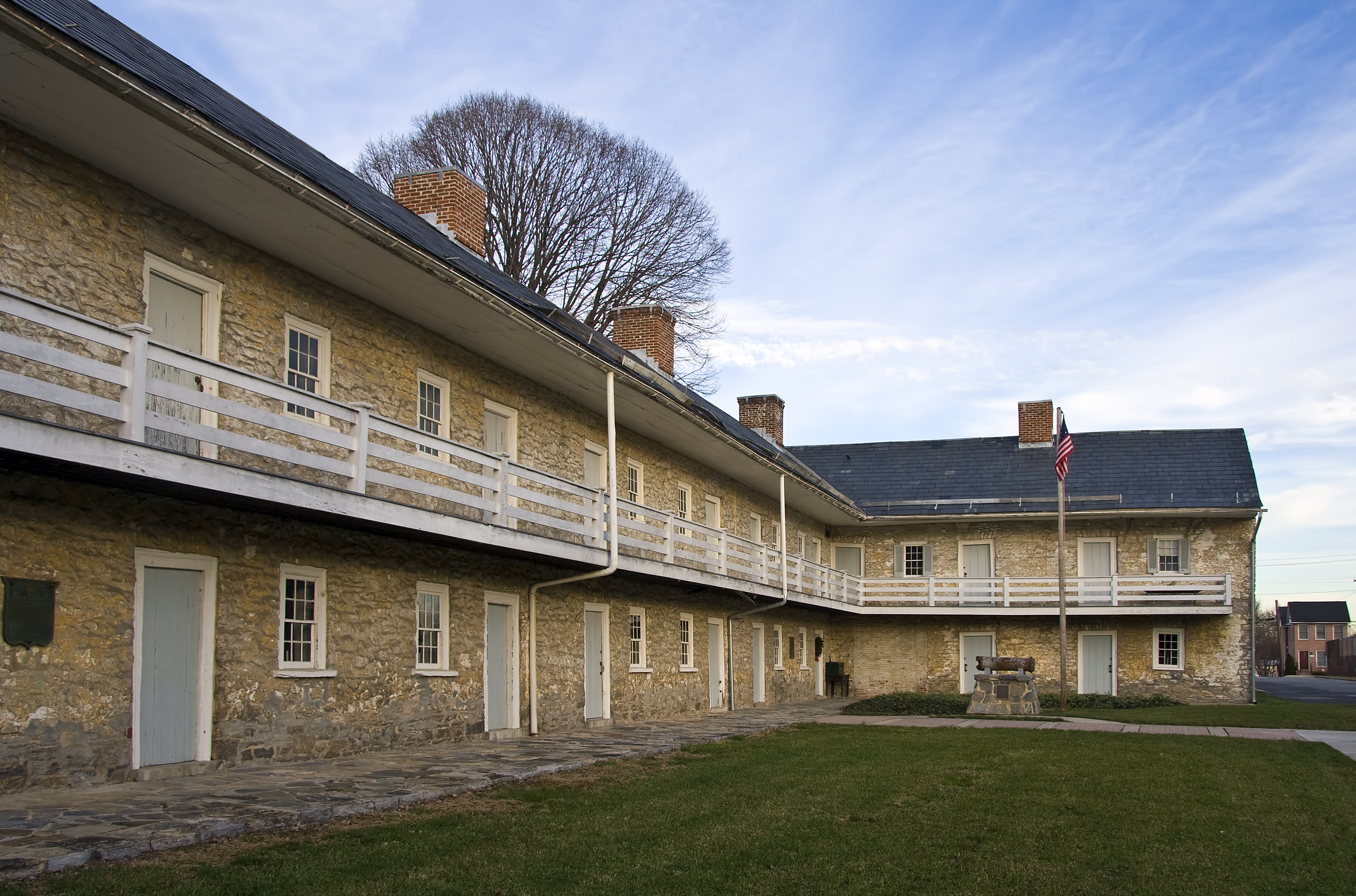
- Hessian Barracks at the Maryland School for the Deaf

- Location within Maryland Location within the United States
- Location: 242 S. Market St., Frederick, Maryland
- Coordinates: 39°24′32.6″N 77°24′34.6″W
- Area: 4 acres (1.6 ha)
- Built: 1780
- NRHP reference No.: 71000373
- Added to NRHP: January 25, 1971

The Maryland School for the Deaf (MSD) is a public K-12 school for the deaf headquartered in Frederick, Maryland. The school is an independent agency of the state of Maryland. It provides public education at no cost to deaf and hard-of-hearing Maryland residents between the ages of zero and 21. It has two campuses located in Frederick and Columbia, Maryland.

== History ==
Prior to the opening of this school, the Pennsylvania Institute for the Deaf and Dumb and later the Institute for the Deaf and Dumb housed deaf children from Maryland.

The school was established in Frederick, Maryland, on 1868 (Chapter 247, Acts of 1867; Chapter 409, Acts of 1868). The original buildings for the school were the Hessian Barracks, used during the Revolutionary War to detain Hessian mercenaries who were hired by the British. The buildings were later used by Lewis and Clark to store supplies before the beginning of their expedition. The Maryland School for the Deaf and Dumb was established on January 1, 1893, following an act of the General Assembly of Maryland. State delegate Henry Baker of Frederick County wrote the bill.

The film Audible chronicles the school.

== Philosophy ==
The academic and life-based education offered at the Frederick campus is comparable to a Maryland high school diploma or an MSD diploma. The curriculum includes communication skills in English and American Sign Language (ASL), such as speech and speech reading, fingerspelling, auditory training, and the use of hearing aids. Additionally, the campus provides a program for athletics, physical education, social activities, and recreational activities.

The curriculum at MSD includes a range of academic subjects, with several Advanced Placement and Honors courses taught in American Sign Language. Students can take courses in American Government, History, Spanish, English, Biology, Algebra, and Chemistry, as well as a variety of electives. In 2007, MSD students had a higher pass rate on state exams (High School Assessments) than their hearing peers. The school has a record of success in academic competitions, including the Academic Bowl, where MSD was the 2008, 2010, 2011, and 2012 Regional Champions. The school frequently places in the top five in math and science competitions.

== Residency ==
The Maryland School for the Deaf provides residential programs and dormitories for male and female students who cannot travel by bus and stay from Monday to Friday. The residential programs also offer after-school activities for its students.

== Athletics ==
The athletic facilities at both campuses include regulation-sized basketball and volleyball courts, as well as athletic fields. Additionally, one of the buildings at the school features an indoor swimming pool.

Organized leagues are available to middle and high school students who compete against other public, private, and schools for deaf and hard of hearing students. MSD teams compete in national tournaments in various sports. MSD students are frequent competitors in the Deaflympics, and MSD coaches are often invited to coach the US teams. Current MSD sports include:

- Baseball
- Basketball
- Cheerleading
- Cross Country
- Football
- Powerlifting
- Soccer (elementary only)
- Softball
- Track and field
- Volleyball
- Wrestling

Sports	National Deaf Prep Championships
Academic Bowl	2005, 2010, 2011, 2012, 2013
Boys Cross country	1986
Girls Cross Country	1986, 1988, 1989, 1990, 1991, 1992
Football	2001, 2003, 2004, 2005, 2006, 2007, 2008, 2009, 2010, 2011, 2014, 2015, 2016, 2017, 2018
Volleyball	2001, 2003, 2004, 2006, 2007, 2008, 2009, 2010, 2013, 2014, 2015, 2018
Boys Basketball	1993, 1994, 2007, 2010, 2011, 2015, 2016, 2018, 2019, 2020
Girls Basketball	2001, 2002, 2003, 2004, 2008, 2010, 2014, 2015, 2016, 2017
Wrestling	1987, 1988, 1995, 1996, 1997, 1998, 1999, 2000, 2002, 2005, 2010, 2011
Soccer	1937
Baseball	2005, 2016, 2017, 2018, 2019
Softball	2008, 2010, 2011, 2015, 2019
Boys Track & Field	1986, 1987, 2017, 2019
Girls Track & Field	1985, 1988, 2002, 2003, 2015, 2016, 2017, 2019

== Frederick ==
Established in 1868, the Frederick Campus of the Maryland School for the Deaf enrolls deaf and hard-of-hearing students in pre-kindergarten through grade 12 (Chapter 247, Acts of 1867; Chapter 409, Acts of 1868). For young children (from birth to age five) and their families, the campus also provides language skill development.

The Frederick campus provides a residential program for approximately thirty percent of its enrolled students from Monday to Friday during the school year, spanning from late August to early June. The dormitories are managed by student life counsellors, who oversee students and organize after-school activities, including intramural games, field trips, swimming, and hiking.

Located on the Frederick campus, Underground is a 1950s style diner that is operated by students, providing a venue for middle and high school students to socialize, enjoy snacks, and engage in recreational activities such as pool and foosball. The diner is decorated in red, black, and white, reminiscent of checkers and 1950s diner colors, with sparkly red booths that contribute to its nostalgic ambiance. In addition to offering a variety of sweets, chips, and beverages, the snack bar also serves hot foods, including french fries, hot dogs, and mozzarella cheese sticks. By working as a cashier or cook at Underground, students gain work experience.

Upon completion of their education, each graduating senior at Maryland School for the Deaf is awarded either the Maryland State High School diploma or the Maryland School for the Deaf diploma. Many MSD graduates continue their education by pursuing higher education degrees. For those who choose not to continue with college, vocational or technical training, as well as vocational rehabilitation services, are available to help them secure employment.

- Ely Building (1972–present): middle school and high school grades 6–12
- Veditz Building (1974–present): CTE, Study Work and LBE High School
- New elementary building (2009–present): grades Toddler–5
- New cafeteria (2011–present)

== Columbia ==
The Maryland School for the Deaf's Columbia campus is situated on a section of land that was once part of the Otten Slave Farm Property, located in the former Pfeffer's Corner neighborhood. George Herman Otten combined two parcels of land in 1853, totaling 91 acres and 132 acres, to create the Otten Farm. After his passing, his estate bequeathed the farm to the regents of the University of Maryland, which used it as an agricultural research center named the "Horse Farm", where they studied race horse breeds. In 1979, a historical survey deemed the property to be of significant historical value. However, a 1992 update indicated that it was not worth preserving since the university could relocate its operations. The property has since undergone several government projects that have reduced its size and changed its appearance. The state purchased some parcels for the Route 100 project, and the county bought some for Waterloo Elementary. The University sold the remaining 68 acres to the Maryland State Department of Health and Mental Hygiene in 1968 to construct the School for the Deaf campus, leaving only 60 acres for university use.

The school opened in September 1973. It serves 120 students with a 2015 budget of approximately $10 million and a staff of 109.

== Notable alumni ==
- George W. Veditz (1878), Founded Maryland School for the Deaf Alumni Association, President of National Association of the Deaf, Preservation of the Sign Language
- Leah Katz-Hernandez (2005), first deaf Receptionist of the United States (ROTUS) in the White House for President Barack Obama
- Rodney Burford (2017), actor, known for portrayal of Tony Hughes in the Netflix drama Dahmer – Monster: The Jeffrey Dahmer Story
- Nyle DiMarco (2007), model, actor, winner of reality television shows (America's Next Top Model and Dancing with the Stars)
