= Deaf U =

2020 American reality television program

- Promotional poster
- Genre: Docuseries, Reality Show
- Music by: BMG Music Productions; Extreme Music; West One Music
- Country of origin: United States
- Original languages: American Sign Language; English
- No. of seasons: 1
- No. of episodes: 8

Production
- Executive producers: Eric Evangelista; Shannon Evangelista; Nyle DiMarco; Brandon Panaligan
- Producer: Sami Housman
- Cinematography: John Keleran; Justin Remillard
- Editors: Billy Murphy; Richard Campbell; Brian Paetzold
- Running time: 16–21 minutes
- Production company: Hot Snakes Media

Original release
- Network: Netflix
- Release: October 9, 2020

Deaf U is an American reality television program on Netflix that follows a group of deaf and hard of hearing college students who attend Gallaudet University, a federally chartered private university for the education of the deaf and hard of hearing that is located in Washington, D.C. Among the series' executive producers is deaf activist, model, and actor Nyle DiMarco. According to DiMarco, the goal of the series is "to show deaf people as humans, from all walks of life."

The series was released on October 9, 2020, on Netflix.

== Production ==
Nyle DiMarco sought to create a series featuring Gallaudet students to show a variety of deaf experiences, including students from signing Deaf families and students who arrived on campus not knowing sign language. DiMarco cited the inspiration for the series to be conversations with friends while attending Gallaudet about a reality television show reflecting their unique college experience. He said that while on spring break students from elsewhere were interested in partying with him and his friends and learning about deaf culture and sign language.

During the development process, the casting department cast students who had strong Deaf identities. DiMarco also encouraged casting students who did not have a strong Deaf identity growing up so different stories could be told and compared. He said with the final cast, "They knew that it was going to be on Netflix, but they weren't sure if this was something that would really tell their story. They were worried that the show could potentially cause them some harm in the future." One of the students, Daequan, hesitated to be involved with the series, not feeling "deaf enough", but DiMarco said he found Daequan's story pertinent to include. Variety reported one of the producers, Naimah Holmes, sharing "that it was a challenge for the creative team to find students who were willing to both spare their time and be vulnerable in front of the camera". On the lack of black women in the cast, she said the crew did not want to force that "into the group based on need for diversity as a token" and hoped to feature more women of color if a second season was greenlighted.

Deaf U was produced by Hot Snakes Media. Eric Evangelista and Shannon Evangelista from Hot Snakes served as executive producers alongside DiMarco and Brandon Panaligan. DiMarco said he intended that a significant portion of the crew be deaf, aiming for 30%, and said that the final portion turned out to be an unprecedented 50%. In July 2020, Netflix ordered the documentary series.

== Cast ==
- Cheyenna Clearbrook
- Rodney Burford
- Tessa Lewis
- Alexa Paulay-Simmons
- Renate Rose
- Daequan Taylor
- Dalton Taylor

== Episodes ==
No.	Title	Original release date
1	"My Left Ear Broke as S**t"	October 9, 2020
2	"I Have So Many Questions"	October 9, 2020
3	"Am I Not Deaf Enough?"	October 9, 2020
4	"Are You over Me?"	October 9, 2020
5	"Do You Usually Bring Girls Here?"	October 9, 2020
6	"So, I Smash Things"	October 9, 2020
7	"I Really Love You, Blah, Blah, Blah"	October 9, 2020
8	"It's Time to Grow Up"	October 9, 2020

== Reception ==
For the series, review aggregator Rotten Tomatoes reported an approval rating of 88% based on 8 reviews, with an average rating of 10/10." Metacritic gave the series a weighted average score of 73 out of 100 based on 5 reviews, indicating "generally favorable reviews".

TV Guide's Megan Vick said Deaf U is "an immediately engaging series thanks to the excellent casting" and compared the docuseries to Netflix's Cheer and Love on the Spectrum. Vick commended Deaf U in how it "expertly balances unscripted hallmarks... with heart". The critic summarized, "The hook of Deaf U is obviously the inside look at how a community has created a rich and dynamic culture with an identity that the outside world has often only considered a disability, and the show delivers on that front. The reason to stay though is that the true value of the show is in getting to know these students as the beautiful work-in-progresses that they are and get invested in who they are aiming to become."

Inkoo Kang of The Hollywood Reporter said Deaf U was "more impressive as a representational leap than as a reality series". Kang did not find the series "particularly involving" beyond "the discussion of deaf politics and culture". The critic noted, "The heavy focus on demographic diversity — and the Elite girls — does render the near-complete lack of women of color rather conspicuous." Kang found the episodes too short to explore potentially "ambitious material", "never quite delivering on emotional impact or entertainment value". The critic summarized, "Deaf U illustrates aplenty that deaf kids can be hornily confused, too. But more context would have made its representational milestones more satisfying."

Aaron Barnhart, reviewing for Primetimer, said Deaf U "will strike you at first as exceedingly trivial, another MTV-style docuseries about sex and drinking among collegiates". Barnhart said, "I think the program's overarching interest in its subjects' sex lives — rather than their academic pursuits and life goals — will strike many as the exact opposite of a deep or layered treatment." He found Deaf U to have "intriguing characters, and fascinating exploration of deaf subculture — albeit one that doesn't exactly cast deaf people in a very favorable light — is a worthwhile drive-by docuseries".

NPR's Eric Deggans described Deaf U as "a series whose rebelliousness is embodied in the wordplay of its title, shines most when it shows how typical challenges college students face are amplified by the unique contours of Deaf culture". The critic said, "'Deaf U' deftly explores these gossipy coming-of-age challenges - how to be true to yourself without hurting others, how to bring something new into your life, like hearing aids or cochlear implants, without being judged by those who see such changes as turning away from your identity as a Deaf person." Deggans said he was generally cynical about docuseries as reductionist and concluded, "But if the moments shown in 'Deaf U' are true, it's a fascinating look at a community rarely seen with such depth and humanity on television."
