= America's Next Top Model season 22 =

Season of television series

America's Next Top Model
- Season 22
- Cycle 22 cast
- Judges: Tyra Banks; Kelly Cutrone; J. Alexander
- No. of contestants: 14
- Winner: Nyle DiMarco
- No. of episodes: 16

Release
- Original network: The CW
- Original release: August 5 – December 4, 2015

Additional information
- Filming dates: April 6 – May 18, 2015

Season chronology
- ← Previous; Season 21 Next → Season 23 (on VH1)

The twenty-second cycle of America's Next Top Model (subtitled as America's Next Top Model: Guys & Girls) premiered on August 5, 2015, and is the sixteenth and final cycle to air on The CW. The network announced in mid-October that they were cancelling the show and the finale episode aired on December 4, 2015.

Like the two previous cycles, cycle 22 featured both female contestants and male contestants. However, for the first time since cycle 13, the height restriction was removed, and the competition was opened to contestants at any height. Tyra Banks, Kelly Cutrone and J. Alexander returned to the judging panel, with photographer Yu Tsai remaining as creative director. Unlike the last three cycles, social media was no longer included on the show. The scoring system remained in place, but only the combined challenge and judges' scores were added into the final tally to determine who would be eliminated.

While there was no international destination for this cycle, the models traveled to Las Vegas for two episodes. This is the second cycle in the series to be shot completely in the United States, after cycle 13.

The winner of the competition was 25-year-old Nyle DiMarco from Washington, D.C., with Mamé Adjei placing as the runner up. DiMarco was the only deaf contestant to win the competition.

== Cycle summary ==
=== Prizes ===
Returning prizes included a modeling contract with NEXT Model Management and a spread in Nylon magazine. Zappos became a new prize for the series, and the winner was chosen for a US$100,000 contract to become the face of the Zappos Couture's 2016 re-launch.

=== Special guests ===
This cycle featured guest judges including interior designers Jonathan and Drew Scott, model Chrissy Teigen, fashion editor Joe Zee and cycle 10 winner Whitney Thompson.

== Contestants ==
The cast includes Nyle DiMarco, is noted for being the first deaf contestant in the history of America's Next Top Model and Mamé Adjei, the then-reigning Miss Maryland USA.

(ages stated are at start of contest)

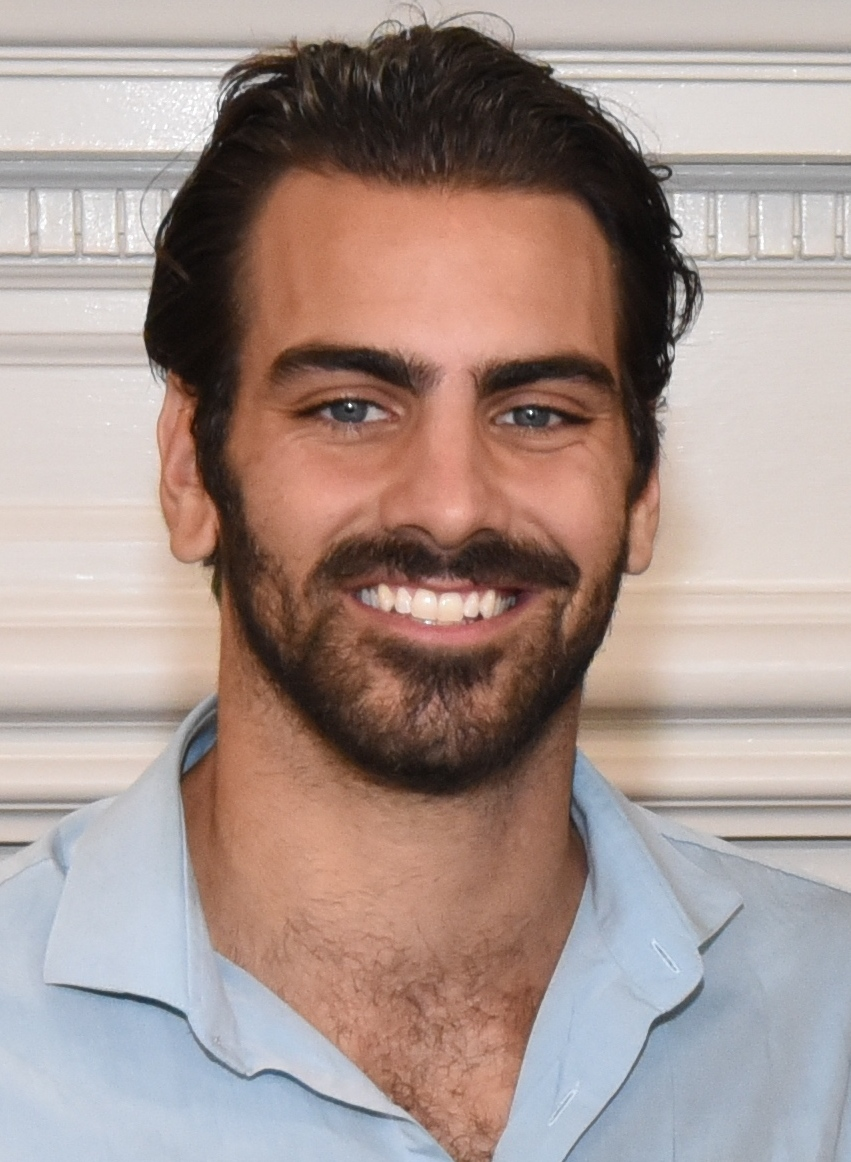
Nyle DiMarco, winner

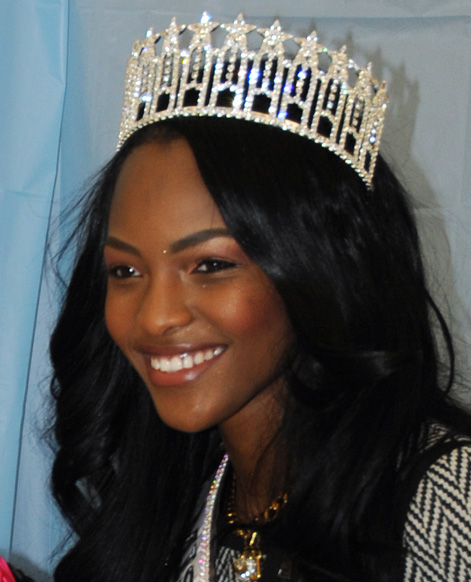
Mamé Adjei, runner-up

Contestant	Age	Height	Hometown	Outcome	Place
Delanie Dischert	21	1.79 m (5 ft 10 1/2 in)	Wilmington, Delaware	Episode 3	14
Stefano Churchill	23	1.85 m (6 ft 1 in)	Virginia Beach, Virginia	Episode 4	13
Ava Capra	19	1.65 m (5 ft 5 in)	Los Angeles, California	Episode 6	12
Ashley Molina	21	1.70 m (5 ft 7 in)	Brooklyn, New York	Episode 7	11
Courtney DuPerow	21	1.60 m (5 ft 3 in)	Avon Lake, Ohio	Episode 8	10
Bello Sánchez	26	1.75 m (5 ft 9 in)	Los Angeles, California	Episode 8	9
Justin Kim	23	1.85 m (6 ft 1 in)	Springfield, Virginia	Episode 9	8
Dustin McNeer	18	1.83 m (6 ft 0 in)	Kernersville, North Carolina	Episode 10	7
Hadassah Richardson	23	1.68 m (5 ft 6 in)	Houston, Texas	Episode 11	6
Devin Clark	21	1.88 m (6 ft 2 in)	San Francisco, California	Episode 13	5
Michael 'Mikey' Heverly	25	1.88 m (6 ft 2 in)	Hollywood, Florida	Episode 16	4–3
Lacey Rogers	18	1.73 m (5 ft 8 in)	El Dorado, Arkansas	Episode 16	4–3
Mamé Adjei	23	1.73 m (5 ft 8 in)	Silver Spring, Maryland	Episode 16	2
Nyle DiMarco	25	1.88 m (6 ft 2 in)	Washington, D.C.	Episode 16	1

== Episodes ==
No. overall	No. in season	Title	Original release date	US viewers (millions)
270	1	"The Guys and Girls Make it to Hollywood"	August 5, 2015	1.15
The thirty-one contestants board a double-decker bus and get their pictures taken as it travels through the streets of Hollywood. Afterwards, they meet the judges before being paired off for a runway show in front of the show's fans. The contestants are later interviewed individually at panel and have their photos from the bus reviewed. Tensions rise backstage after Bello's crown gets broken by one of the other contestants. After panel, the contestants are driven to the top model house. There Miss J and Yu Tsai explain that there is a pool of foam containing beach balls with the names of the twenty-two contestants who have been chosen to move on to the next stage of the casting process. Those who do not find a ball with their name on it are eliminated from the competition.: Featured photographer: Massimo Campana
271	2	"The Girl Who Walks Away"	August 12, 2015	1.21
The remaining contestants move into the top model home to meet Drew and Jonathan Scott, stars of Property Brothers to see their decoration of their house. After choosing their beds, Yu Tsai and Miss J show up for the very first challenge. The contestants must take part in a pose-off in pairs with the last contestant standing being granted entrance into the Tyra suite. Ava and Mamé make it through each round successfully, but it is Mamé who is chosen as the winner of the challenge. Later into the night Hadassah calls a house meeting, rubbing several of the contestants the wrong way. The following day the contestants show up at Universal CityWalk before a live crowd to pose semi-nude with personalized hashtags in a shoot for the season's promotional poster. contestants Alexa decides to quit the competition before the photo shoot, and Devin suffers a breakdown after doing badly. Back at the house, Devin and Bello get into a heated argument. That same night the judges deliberate on the photos from the shoot before deciding who will make the top fourteen. In the morning, Yu Tsai and Miss J meet the models at the Long Beach Shipyard to announce that the contestants will face one last challenge before learning whether or not they've made the final cut. The models will take part in a fashion show three stories in the air, walking across shipping containers before walking off the edge of the runway. Those who are harnessed across to the other side will become finalists, while those who are lowered to the ground will be eliminated. The episode concludes with a cliffhanger, continuing the following episode.: Featured photographers: Massimo Campana, Erik Asla; Special guests: Drew Scott, Jonathan Scott, Patrick Tumey, Alexis Borges
272	3	"The Guy Who Gets Shipped Out"	August 19, 2015	1.20
The episode continues where the previous one left off, with the contestants meeting agency director of NEXT management in Los Angeles, Alexis Borges. He explains that all the models who have made it into the final cast will be carried across the gap between shipping containers, and that those who haven't will be lowered down. The contestants are then styled with clothes from Erik Rosete's fashion line and shoes from Miss J's new collection before being taken to the top of the first stack of containers. One by one, all the contestants take their turn on the runway before stepping off the edge. Semi-finalists Bryant, Larissa, Gage, Miguel, Maleesa, India and Dallas are all lowered to the ground and are eliminated. Tyra congratulates the top fourteen before they return to the house to celebrate and see their scores for the challenge. The following day, the contestants are driven to a studio to meet Yu Tsai and photographer Erik Asla for their first official photo shoot. The models are paired for a portrait shoot in which they will be bound together by different objects. Before starting, Tyra shows up to give the models a lesson on good and bad 'no neck posing'. At panel Tyra announces that the social media scoring has been dropped from the show. She explains that in cases of a tie among two or more contestants in the bottom, the judges will vote on which contestants will stay and which will be eliminated. In contrast to the previous three cycles, the judges' scores will be revealed as each contestant is called during elimination. Devin is revealed to have obtained the highest overall score. Delanie and Stefano are called forward as the bottom two. The final scores are revealed, and Delanie is eliminated from the competition for her lack of intensity and failing to put her beauty to good use.: Featured photographer: Erik Asla; Special guests: Alexis Borges, Erik Rosete
273	4	"The Girl Who Has a Close Shave"	August 26, 2015	1.34
The top thirteen contestants meet with Yu Tsai for their photo shoot. Yu Tsai introduces them to army veterans Alex Minsky and Melissa Stockwell, who both talk about the limbs they lost during combat, and what their lives have been like since. The theme for the session is to honor war veterans whilst engaging in extreme couture posing. Nyle opens up about his deafness, and the isolation he experiences in the house because of it. Immediately before the shoot begins, the contestants meet fashion editor Joe Zee, who will look over the styling for the day. Devin has a hard time following direction. Hadassah and Stefano have a difficult time, and Dustin is asked to leave the set for laughing in the shoot. The following day, the models are taken to the Cristophe salon for their makeovers. Most are happy with their changes, but Hadassah initially rejects having half of her hair shaved and contemplates leaving the competition. After being talked into it by the judges at the salon, she accepts the change. At panel, Ashley and Dustin are critiqued for their lack of connection with the veterans and lackluster photos. Justin, Courtney, Mikey, Bello, Devin and Ava, who later receives best photo during elimination, all receive positive feedback. The rest of the models receive mixed critique. Stefano is judged for failing to deliver once again, while Hadassah is called out for not handling her look with a positive attitude. Both of them receive the lowest scores and land in the bottom two. Hadassah receives the last photo with a score of 22.4, and after his second consecutive appearance at the bottom, Stefano is eliminated.: Featured photographer: Erik Asla; Special guests: Alex Minsky, Melissa Stockwell, Joe Zee, Cristophe, Romina, Sharle, Dr. Julie Kim, Dr. Edgardo Falcon Jr.
274	5	"The Guy Who Gets a Hickey"	September 2, 2015	1.20
The contestants meet with Yu Tsai and are introduced to Anthony De La Rosa, an agent for new faces at Next Model Management. For the challenge, the contestants are photographed by Massimo Campana with an Oppo cell phone to create composite cards. They must each take a full body and close up photo and retouch each photo to create a presentable final result with as little change as possible. For having found the right balance between airbrushing and natural beauty, Mikey is chosen as the winner of the challenge. He is allowed to take another person with him out to dinner, and chooses Devin to go with him. The photo shoot takes place at the house the following morning, where it is revealed that the contestants will be styled in futuristic sportswear for a final shot that will be completely unretouched. Tensions from the night before continue to brew throughout the day. On set, Mamé, Mikey, Devin and Lacey all do well. In contrast, Dustin, Courtney and Hadassah do not. During judging, Mamé, Lacey, Devin, Ashley, Bello and Mikey all receive positive feedback. Nyle is critiqued for his lack of variation and intensity in his photos. Meanwhile, Hadassah and Dustin once again leave the judges unimpressed. Courtney is praised for her amazing face on film, but is critiqued for not looking like a model in person, as well as her failure to present herself like one. At elimination, Lacey is awarded best photo. The next highest score goes to Mamé, who Tyra notifies would have received best photo if she'd achieved a higher score on the challenge. Hadassah and Dustin are called forward as the bottom two, both for their failure to progress and produce stronger photos. The final scores are revealed, and Hadassah is given another chance.: Featured photographers: Massimo Campana (challenge), Erik Asla (photo shoot); Special guests: Anthony De La Rosa
275	6	"The Girl Who Gets Possessed"	September 9, 2015	1.40
The contestants meet with Kelly and cycle 10 winner Whitney Thompson and explains them will be paired up for a photo shoot session and decide on themes for their client. Several contestants have trouble working together, while the pairing of Mamé and Mikey causes feelings of jealousy in Justin. At the end of the challenge, Nyle is chosen as the winner. Afterwards, the models return home to see their scores. Ava becomes upset after she sees her score is a 7, ranking near the bottom of the leader board. The following morning, a fight ensues between Hadassah and Mamé after Mamé enters to use the bathroom while Hadassah is taking a shower. The feud continues on the bus as the contestants are being driven to the shoot. At the studio, the contestants meet Yu Tsai and photographer Erik Asla for a session in which the contestants will be harnessed in the air as victims of a 'fashion exorcism'. Lacey, Nyle, and Mamé do a great job on set, while Ava, Courtney, and Hadassah struggle. Back at home, Justin tries to relieve the tension between Hadassah and Mamé by calling a house meeting so that they can talk out their problems. During panel, Lacey, Justin and Nyle receive good feedback. Hadassah becomes emotional after she receives praise from the judges, having been nervous about how bad the session went. Tyra clarifies that although her final shot was good, the rest of her film was not. The rest models received mixed critique, with Ava, Bello, and Courtney receiving the worst feedback. At elimination, Nyle receives the highest score. Bello narrowly misses landing in the bottom, leaving Ava and Courtney up for elimination. Tyra notes their declining quality of work as the reason they're in the bottom, and after the final scores are revealed, it is Courtney who is given the chance to stay.: Featured photographer: Erik Asla
276	7	"The Guy Who Acts a Fool"	September 16, 2015	1.52
The models arrived at The CW Studios in Burbank, as they are introduced to The CW's Executive Vice President of Talent and Casting Lori Openden. They are paired off to perform in a Shakespearean love scene in front of Lori and a panel of CW executives. The best performer will be given the opportunity to star in a walk on role in one of the CW's scripted series. The models are given thirty minutes to rehearse their lines. Ashley becomes frustrated with Devin for his failure to take the challenge seriously. Meanwhile, Mamé questions whether or not her feelings for Justin are reciprocated. Both of them are the first to act out the scene, and are critiqued for their lack of chemistry. Bello forgets his lines and improvises the script, confusing Hadassah. Courtney is judged for her lack of confidence and talent, while Mikey is critiqued for moving around too much. Nyle and Lacey perform the best as a whole, impressing Lori and her colleagues. In contrast, Ashley and Devin are deemed to be the worst. Lacey is ultimately chosen as the winner of the challenge. On the day of the shoot, the models are driven to Zuma Beach to meet with Yu Tsai. He explains that they will have to put their acting skills to the test in a sexy commercial where they will be paired off to advertise the fictitious deodorant, Boom Boom Boom. At elimination, Lacey is revealed to have attained the highest score, with Ashley and Devin being called forward as the bottom two. Both of them are reprimanded for their performance at the challenge, which reflected on the results of the shoot. With a score of 28.4, Tyra hands the last screen capture to Devin, and Ashley is eliminated from the competition.: Featured director: Erik Asla; Special guests: Lori Openden, Dana Theodoratos, Justin Rosenblatt, Brittany Williams (Nyle's friend)
277	8	"The Girl Who Got All Dolled Up"	September 23, 2015	1.36
The models are doing for their challenge as they divided into three-person teams and given one hour to create a 6-second Vine video to serve as a public service announcement for STEM ("Science, Technology, Engineering and Mathematics"). In the rush to finish, Bello accidentally deletes their video, forcing his team to re-film the video at the last minute. Courtney's unconvincing portrayal of a woman in a position of power is criticized, as is their disjointed script, and they come in last. Conversely, Hadassah, Mamé & Mikey's video incorporates both message and humor to result in their winning the challenge. For the photo shoot, the models are given a demonstration by Tyra on how to portray a life-sized doll, before being assigned a different themed doll to personify. Courtney struggles because she doesn't know what "fashionista" means, and reveals that she has never read a fashion magazine. Bello and Devin both struggle too, while the rest all perform well. At panel, Tyra shocks everyone by revealing that there will be a double elimination. Nyle, Justin and Mikey's photos are praised, although the latter is informed that his film wasn't as strong. Hadassah's improvement in the competition is also noted, but it is Lacey who once again receives the highest praise from the judges, including Kelly's statement that it is the best photo of the competition so far. Courtney and Bello's facial expressions fall flat while Devin's is deemed to be too comical for a doll. After deliberation, Lacey wins her third best photo, while Bello, Courtney and Devin land in the bottom three. Courtney is the first to be eliminated, followed shortly after by Bello, with Devin surviving his second consecutive appearance in the bottom.: Featured photographer: Erik Asla; Special guests: Robert Behar, Brittany Furlan
278	9	"The Guy or Girl Who Came Back"	October 2, 2015	1.07
The final seven contestants convene at the offices of NEXT Model Management for their go-see challenge, and are shocked to see the previously eliminated models there. They are then told that the best performing eliminated contestant will rejoin the competition after the next elimination, effectively replacing one of those still remaining. The models choose their partners for the go-sees, and Bello becomes agitated when Hadassah doesn't pick him. Dustin and Justin receive bad feedback for walking into (and interrupting) Ashley and Mikey's casting; Bello doesn't book any go-sees, Devin only books one, and the team of Courtney and Mamé arrive late back at the office, disqualifying them from the challenge. Mamé is revealed to be the only person who booked all 4 go-sees, but because of her tardiness, it is Hadassah who wins the challenge instead. Back at the model house, there is mild confusion as everyone gets accustomed to a full house of 14 people again. Bello and Hadassah have a confrontation in the hot tub, and Hadassah ultimately leaves. For the photo shoot, the models are paired with a canine friend and are told to embody the personality and look of their animal partners. Most of the models perform well, with the exception of Ashley, Delanie, Devin and Justin. At panel, many models receive praise for their photos. Dustin is commended for finally breaking out of his shell and trying many different poses, and Stefano's professionalism is lauded. Nyle, Hadassah, Lacey, Ava, Courtney and Bello also receive praise, but it is Nyle who later wins best photo of the week for the second time. Before announcing who will be eliminated, Tyra reveals the results of the previously eliminated contestants, and their scores are revealed from lowest to highest. Dustin ultimately wins the right to rejoin the competition. Devin and Justin land in the bottom two, Devin for his continued comical facial expressions and features deemed unsuitable for many types of editorial photos, and Justin for his fading swagger and personality. The show then ends on a cliffhanger as Devin and Justin await their fate.: Featured photographer: Yu Tsai; Special guests: Alexis Borges
279	10	"The Girl Who Became Bootyful"	October 9, 2015	1.00
Concluded from the previous episode, Devin & Justin, the previous week's bottom two, awaiting their final scores. Devin is revealed to be the final contestant in the top seven, and Justin is eliminated from the competition, much to Mamé's dismay. The remaining models return to the house to pack their bags, where several contestants express their dismay at Dustin's return to the competition, especially Hadassah, who feels Dustin hasn't learned anything from his elimination. Mamé finds a letter from Justin, becoming emotional over his elimination. Afterwards, the contestants are driven to Las Vegas and are taken to their new home – a penthouse at the SLS Las Vegas hotel. Later that night Miss J and Yu Tsai meet the models at a private VIP pool party, where they are introduced to cycle 20 contestant Don Benjamin, who will serve as the judge for their first challenge is Las Vegas. The contestants are asked to jump into the swimming pool while photographer Massimo Campana snaps their photos as they're falling through the air. Each contestant is allotted a single frame, the best of which will be chosen as the winner of the challenge. Hadassah, Dustin and Mamé are deemed to have taken the best photos, but it is Mamé who is chosen as the winner of the challenge. She is rewarded with a luxury spa treatment for two, which she later decides to share with Hadassah. For the shoot, all the contestants are assigned roles to portray in a music video that promotes Tyra's new line of beauty products. Most contestants do well, but Dustin struggles the most after flirting with several of the extras instead of practicing. At panel, Dustin and Hadassah receive the worst feedback. In contrast, Devin and Mikey receive the most praise, with the latter achieving the highest overall score. Hadassah and Dustin land together in the bottom two, like they had done earlier in the competition when Dustin was first eliminated. The final scores are revealed, and Dustin is once again eliminated in favor of Hadassah. The episode concludes with the world premiere of the music video that was filmed during the episode.: Featured photographer: Massimo Campana (challenge); Featured director: Tyra Banks; Special guests: Don Benjamin
280	11	"And Then That Happened"	October 23, 2015	0.73
The episode highlights all the phases of the competition, showing never-before-seen footage, including the filming of the opening sequence, Dustin and Nyle's 'bromance', a visit from Miss J and Yu Tsai shortly before makeovers, Ava and Bello's failed bubble bath, extended moments from Ava and Courtney's scrape with some of the other contestants, an argument that ensued between Ashley, Hadassah and Mamé, team DMA's music video, and many more.
281	12	"The Guy Who Closed Deal in Vegas"	October 30, 2015	0.94
The following day the models arrive at the headquarters of Zappos Couture, the brand that will use the winner of the competition as the face of their 2016 re-launch. There, Kelly introduces them to Melissa Costa, head of Zappos brand marketing. They are later shown a clip from Tony Hsieh, the CEO and founder of the brand, and are introduced to the second judge for their upcoming challenge, Eileen Tetreault. After being briefed on the mission of the brand, they are taken to the Sayers Club at the SLS for a salon style runway show wearing different outfits from Zappos. Backstage, Hadassah gets reprimanded by Kelly after disagreeing with the scores and ranking of the last elimination. Lacey and Hadassah fail to sell their outfits, while Mikey, Nyle, Mamé and Devin are all given praise for their performances. After the show is over, Mamé is chosen as the winner of the challenge, and receives a complete look from the show as her prize. On the day of the shoot, the contestants have to take photos in groups with Miss J for the fictitious social media platform 'Fierce-a-gram' complete with personalized hashtags. The final result of each photo will be cropped and uncropped, with the cropped version being seemingly sweet and innocent, and the uncropped version revealing a wild Las Vegas party. Lacey is criticized for her lack of variety and one-note look, and Devin is once again critiqued for his over the top expressions. Hadassah is congratulated for standing out in the group shots of other contestants, but failing to stand out in her own shoot. Mikey is noted for quickly emerging as a front runner in the competition. After the shoot, the contestants are taken on a limo ride through Las Vegas. Back at the house Devin and Mikey get into an argument over Mikey's flirting with Hadassah and Mamé, insisting that Ashley was eliminated due to having been distracted over Mikey. The show heads back to Los Angeles, Mikey and Mamé are given the most positive critique, with the other four contestants receiving varying degrees of mixed feedback. Mamé receives the highest score, but Tyra points out that it was Mikey who'd achieved the highest combined total from the judges for his photo. Mikey, Devin and Nyle are all given their photos, leaving Hadassah and Lacey as the bottom two. Hadassah is revealed to have the lowest score at 30.2, and is thus eliminated.: Featured photographer: Erik Asla; Special guests: Melissa Costa, Eileen Tetreault
282	13	"The Girl Who Got Shot in the Dark"	November 6, 2015	0.95
Featured photographer: Erik Asla; Special guests: Alli Webb, Marie-Pier St-Hilaire, Francis Libiran
283	14	"The Guy Who Was a Momma's Boy"	November 13, 2015	1.03
Featured photographer: Carolyn London; Special guests: Chrissy Teigen, Michelle Lee, J. Errico
284	15	"Finale Part 1: The Girl Who Made a Splash"	November 20, 2015	0.95
The top four contestants battle it out for the spot in the finale. They did a Nylon magazine shoot and Zappos Couture shoot.: Featured photographers: Mark "The Cobra Snake" Hunter (Nylon magazine), Erik Asla (Zappos Couture); Special guests: J. Errico, Melissa Costa, Kevin Bailey, Keith Carlos
285	16	"Finale Part 2: America's Next Top Model is..."	December 4, 2015	1.16
The final four presented their business presentation where in Nyle and Mame were chosen as the finalists. Reiko Nakano performs on a violin as contestants walk the runway at Walt Disney Concert Hall. The final two battle it out for Rocky Gathercole. After the deliberation, Nyle was chosen as the 22nd winner of America's Next Top Model.

== Summaries ==
=== Call-out order ===
Order	Episodes													
Order	3 (Note: In episode 1, the pool of 31 semi-finalists was reduced to the top 22 who moved on to the next round of casting. Episode 2 ended in a cliffhanger, and the elimination was postponed until the following episode. At the beginning of episode 3, the remaining pool of 21 semi-finalists (minus one dropout from the week before) was reduced to the final fourteen contestants. The first official elimination happened at the end of the episode.)		4	5	6	7	8	9 (Note: In episode 9, all fourteen contestants were present at panel. The seven eliminated models up to that point received a complete set of scores for participating in the challenge and shoot, with the highest score winning the opportunity to return to the competition. They were revealed from lowest to highest as being Ashley, Delanie, Bello, Courtney, Ava and Stefano until Dustin was revealed as the contestant to return. The safe contestants were called out separately, with Devin and Justin landing in the bottom two. The episode ended in a cliffhanger, with the elimination resuming at the beginning of the next episode. At the beginning of episode 10, Justin was eliminated from the competition.)	10	12	13	14 (Note: In episode 14, Lacey and Mikey had a tied score while in the bottom two. As a result, neither of them was eliminated from the competition. Tyra announced that since no one had been sent home, one guy and one girl would be eliminated the following week.)	16 (Note: In episode 15, no one was eliminated as the episode ended in a cliffhanger, and the elimination was postponed until the following episode, in which only one contestant of each gender was put through to the finale. First, Nyle was chosen as the last remaining male, eliminating Mikey. Next, Mamé was chosen as the last remaining female and second finalist, eliminating Lacey.)	
1	Dustin	Devin	Ava	Lacey	Nyle	Lacey	Lacey	Nyle	Mikey	Mamé	Mikey	Mamé	Nyle; Mamé	Nyle
2	Lacey	Justin	Mikey	Mamé	Lacey	Mamé	Nyle	Hadassah	Devin	Mikey	Mamé	Nyle	Nyle; Mamé	Mamé
3	Mamé	Lacey	Bello	Devin	Mamé	Nyle	Justin	Lacey	Lacey	Devin	Lacey	Lacey; Mikey	Lacey; Mikey	
4	Justin	Mikey	Devin	Mikey	Hadassah	Bello	Mikey	Mamé	Mamé	Nyle	Nyle	Lacey; Mikey	Lacey; Mikey	
5	Nyle	Ava	Courtney	Ashley	Justin	Mikey	Hadassah	Mikey	Nyle	Lacey	Devin			
6	Stefano	Mamé	Justin	Bello	Devin	Justin	Mamé	Devin	Hadassah	Hadassah				
7	Ashley	Bello	Nyle	Nyle	Ashley	Hadassah	Devin	Justin	Dustin					
8	Hadassah	Ashley	Lacey	Ava	Mikey	Courtney	Bello; Courtney							
9	Delanie	Courtney	Mamé	Courtney	Bello	Devin	Bello; Courtney							
10	Bello	Hadassah	Dustin	Justin	Courtney	Ashley								
11	Ava	Nyle	Ashley	Hadassah	Ava									
12	Mikey	Dustin	Hadassah	Dustin										
13	Courtney	Stefano	Stefano											
14	Devin	Delanie												

The contestant was eliminated
The contestant was a part of a non-elimination bottom two
The contestant won the competition

=== Bottom two ===
Episode	Contestants	Eliminated
3	Delanie & Stefano	Delanie
4	Hadassah & Stefano	Stefano
5	Dustin & Hadassah	Dustin
6	Ava & Courtney	Ava
7	Ashley & Devin	Ashley
8	Bello, Courtney & Devin	Bello
8	Bello, Courtney & Devin	Courtney
9	Devin & Justin	Justin
10	Dustin & Hadassah	Dustin
12	Hadassah & Lacey	Hadassah
13	Devin & Nyle	Devin
14	Lacey & Mikey	None
16	Mikey & Nyle	Mikey
16	Lacey & Mamé	Lacey
16	Mamé & Nyle	Mamé

The contestant was eliminated after their first time in the bottom two
The contestant was eliminated after their second time in the bottom two
The contestant was eliminated after their fourth time in the bottom two
The contestant was eliminated in the final judging and placed third
The contestant was eliminated in the final judging and placed as the runner-up

=== Average call-out order ===
Casting call-out order, comeback first call-out and final episode are not included.

Rank by average	Place	Model	Call-out total	Number of call-outs	Call-out average
1	3–4	Lacey	33	11	3.00
2	3–4	Mikey	39	11	3.54
3	2	Mamé	40	11	3.64
4	1	Nyle	47	11	4.27
5	5	Devin	46	10	4.60
6	8	Justin	39	7	5.57
7	9	Bello	37	6	6.17
8	12	Ava	25	4	6.25
9	6	Hadassah	63	9	7.00
10	11	Ashley	41	5	8.20
11	10	Courtney	50	6	8.33
12	7	Dustin	41	4	10.25
13	13	Stefano	26	2	13.00
14	14	Delanie	14	1	14.00

=== Scoring chart ===
Place	Model	Episodes													Total score	Average
Place	Model	3	4	5	6	7	8	9 (Note: In episode 9, all fourteen contestants were present at panel. The seven eliminated models up to that point received a complete set of scores for participating in the challenge and shoot, with the highest score winning the opportunity to return to the competition. They were revealed from lowest to highest as being Ashley, Delanie, Bello, Courtney, Ava and Stefano until Dustin was revealed as the contestant to return.)	10	12	13	14 (Note: In episode 14, Lacey and Mikey had a tied score of 35.2 while in the bottom two. As a result, neither of them was eliminated from the competition.)	16 (Note: The contestants received scores for every single elimination round in the finals until the final four and the announcement of the winner. The eliminations in episode 16 happened without scoring. Lacey and Mikey were both were tied for third place.)		Total score	Average
1	Nyle	30.0	26.0	31.9	39.7	34.7	37.2	39.0	33.7	33.9	33.0	37.0	IN	WIN	376.1	34.1
2	Mamé	33.0	25.0	36.1	34.5	35.0	31.6	32.9	34.0	35.6	34.0	37.1	IN	OUT	368.8	33.5
3-4	Lacey	34.7	25.6	37.2	35.0	37.1	38.5	36.4	34.3	31.0	33.9	35.2	OUT		378.9	34.5
3-4	Mikey	34.5	28.3	34.7	32.1	33.1	35.7	32.4	35.5	35.2	37.5	35.2	OUT		374.2	34.0
5	Devin	36.0	26.9	35.4	32.7	28.4	31.5	31.3	34.6	34.6	29.1				320.5	32.0
6	Hadassah	30.1	22.4	30.5	33.4	30.1	34.2	36.6	32.8	30.2					280.3	31.1
7	Dustin	29.5	23.6	28.4				35.1	30.5						147.1	29.4
8	Justin	35.5	26.0	31.4	32.9	31.3	35.8	29.9							222.8	31.8
9	Bello	32.3	27.6	33.5	31.6	33.7	31.0	30.6							220.3	31.4
10	Courtney	30.7	26.7	31.4	31.3	29.5	27.8	32.5							209.9	29.9
11	Ashley	32.2	22.5	33.0	32.2	27.2		27.1							174.2	29.0
12	Ava	33.3	28.5	31.5	29.4			34.0							156.7	31.3
13	Stefano	26.3	22.3					35.0							83.6	27.8
14	Delanie	26.0						30.5							56.5	28.2

Indicates the contestant had the highest score that week.
Indicates the contestant was eliminated that week.
Indicates the contestant was in the bottom two that week.
Indicates the contestant won the competition.

=== Photo shoot guide ===
- Episode 1 photo shoot: Swimsuits on a double-decker bus (casting)
- Episode 2 photo shoot: Semi-nude holding up hashtags (casting)
- Episode 3 photo shoot: Nude and bound together in pairs
- Episode 4 photo shoot: Extreme posing with war veterans
- Episode 5 photo shoot: Unretouched geometrical sportswear
- Episode 6 photo shoot: Possessed and suspended in mid air
- Episode 7 commercial: Boom Boom Boom deodorant in pairs
- Episode 8 photo shoot: Living Life-Size dolls
- Episode 9 photo shoot: Look-alike editorial with dogs
- Episode 10 music video: "BOOTYful" – Tyra Beauty theme song
- Episode 12 photo shoot: Cropped and uncropped Fierce-a-gram photos
- Episode 13 photo shoot: Night creatures in the dark
- Episode 14 photo shoot: Posing with mothers
- Episode 15 photo shoots: Nylon magazine spread; Zappos couture campaign

=== Makeovers ===
- Stefano – Long blonde extensions with highlights
- Ava – Mullet cut
- Ashley – Tyra Banks inspired pixie cut and dyed brown with contacts
- Courtney – Layered gray ombre with a side fringe and teeth whitened
- Bello – Long straight black weave
- Justin – Faux hawk fade
- Dustin – Sun kissed blonde
- Hadassah – Hair shaved on one side
- Devin – Shaved near bald and dyed black
- Mikey – Trimmed and lightened
- Lacey – Saleisha Stowers inspired chin length bob with bangs and dyed dark brown
- Mamé – Diana Ross inspired long curly voluminous chocolate brown weave
- Nyle – Trimmed and cleaned up
