= Audible (film) =

2021 documentary short film by Matthew Ogens

- Promotional poster
- Directed by: Matthew Ogens
- Produced by: Geoff McLean
- Starring: Amaree McKenstry-Hall
- Cinematography: Billy Pena
- Edited by: Darrin Roberts
- Music by: Jackson Greenberg
- Production companies: Film 45; Vision Film Company
- Distributed by: Netflix
- Release date: July 1, 2021
- Running time: 39 minutes
- Country: United States
- Language: English

Audible is a 2021 American short documentary film made for Netflix and directed by Matthew Ogens. It was nominated for Best Documentary Short at the 94th Academy Awards.

== Summary ==
It follows Maryland School for the Deaf senior athlete Amaree McKenstry-Hall and his teammates' journey to defend their winning streak, while simultaneously coping with the tragic loss of a close friend to suicide.

The documentary documents other students at school's campus in Frederick, Maryland and McKenstry-Hall's personal life. In 2020 McKenstry-Hall completed his studies at MSD.

== Release and reception ==
The film was released on July 1, 2021, and received a nomination for Best Documentary Short Subject at the 94th Academy Awards.

== Further media ==
- "Maryland School for the Deaf tackles Oscars in Netflix's 'Audible'". WTOP-FM. February 4, 2022.
