= 23rd Critics' Choice Awards =

2018 US film and television awards

- Date: January 11, 2018
- Site: Barker Hangar, Santa Monica, California, United States
- Hosted by: Olivia Munn

Highlights
- Most wins: Film: The Shape of Water (4); Television: Big Little Lies (4)
- Most nominations: Film: The Shape of Water (14); Television: Feud: Bette and Joan (6)
- Best Picture: The Shape of Water
- Best Comedy Series: The Marvelous Mrs. Maisel
- Best Drama Series: The Handmaid's Tale
- Best Limited Series: Big Little Lies
- Best Movie Made for TV: The Wizard of Lies
- Website: www.criticschoice.com

Television/radio coverage
- Network: The CW

The 23rd Critics' Choice Awards were presented on January 11, 2018, at the Barker Hangar at the Santa Monica Airport, honoring the finest achievements of filmmaking and television programming in 2017. The ceremony was broadcast on The CW and hosted by Olivia Munn. The nominations were announced on December 6, 2017. Netflix led the nominations for television with 20, followed by HBO with 15. Big Little Lies won four awards, becoming the biggest television winner of the night and repeating its victory four days prior at the 75th Golden Globe Awards.

== Winners and nominees ==
=== Film ===
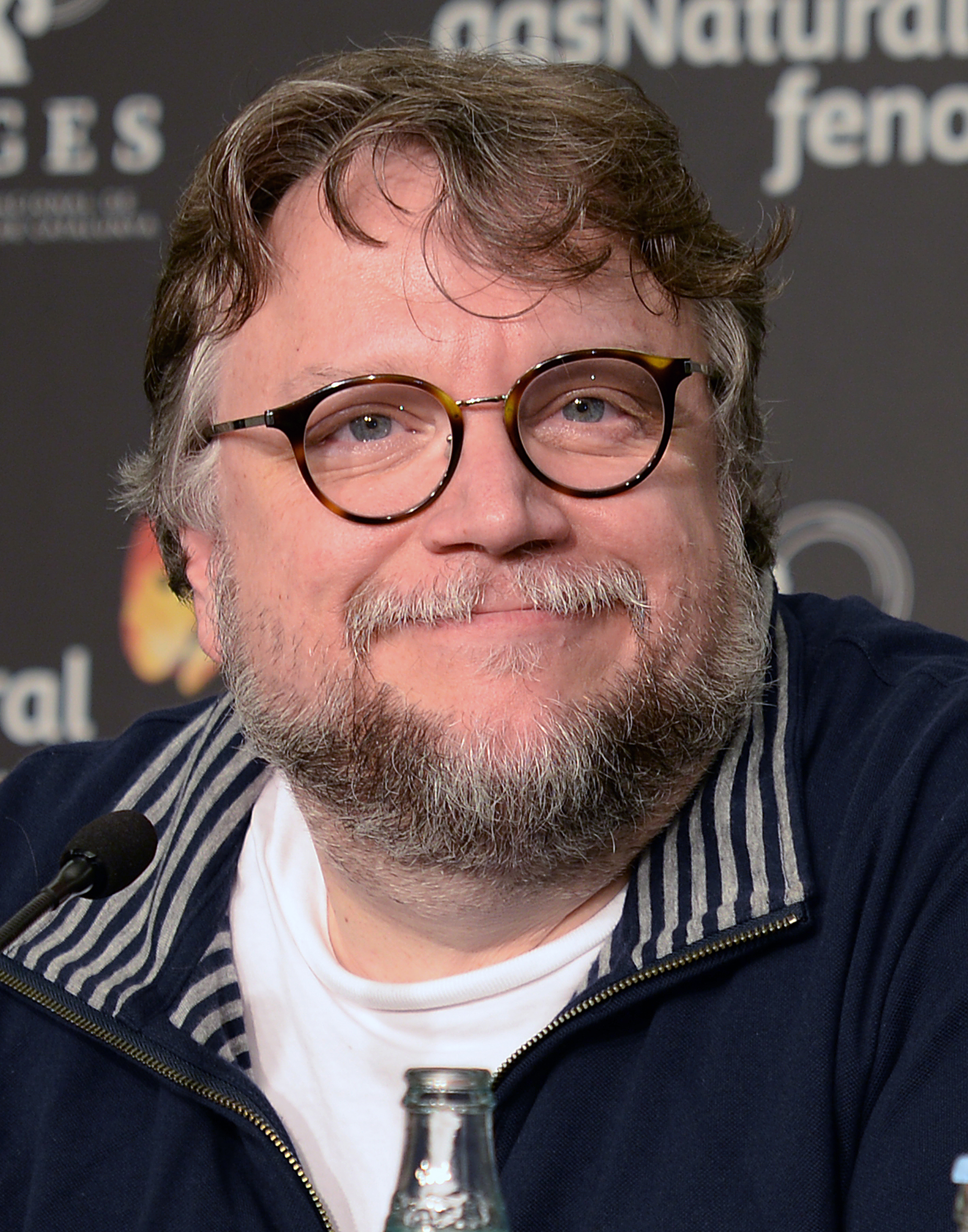
Guillermo del Toro, Best Director winner

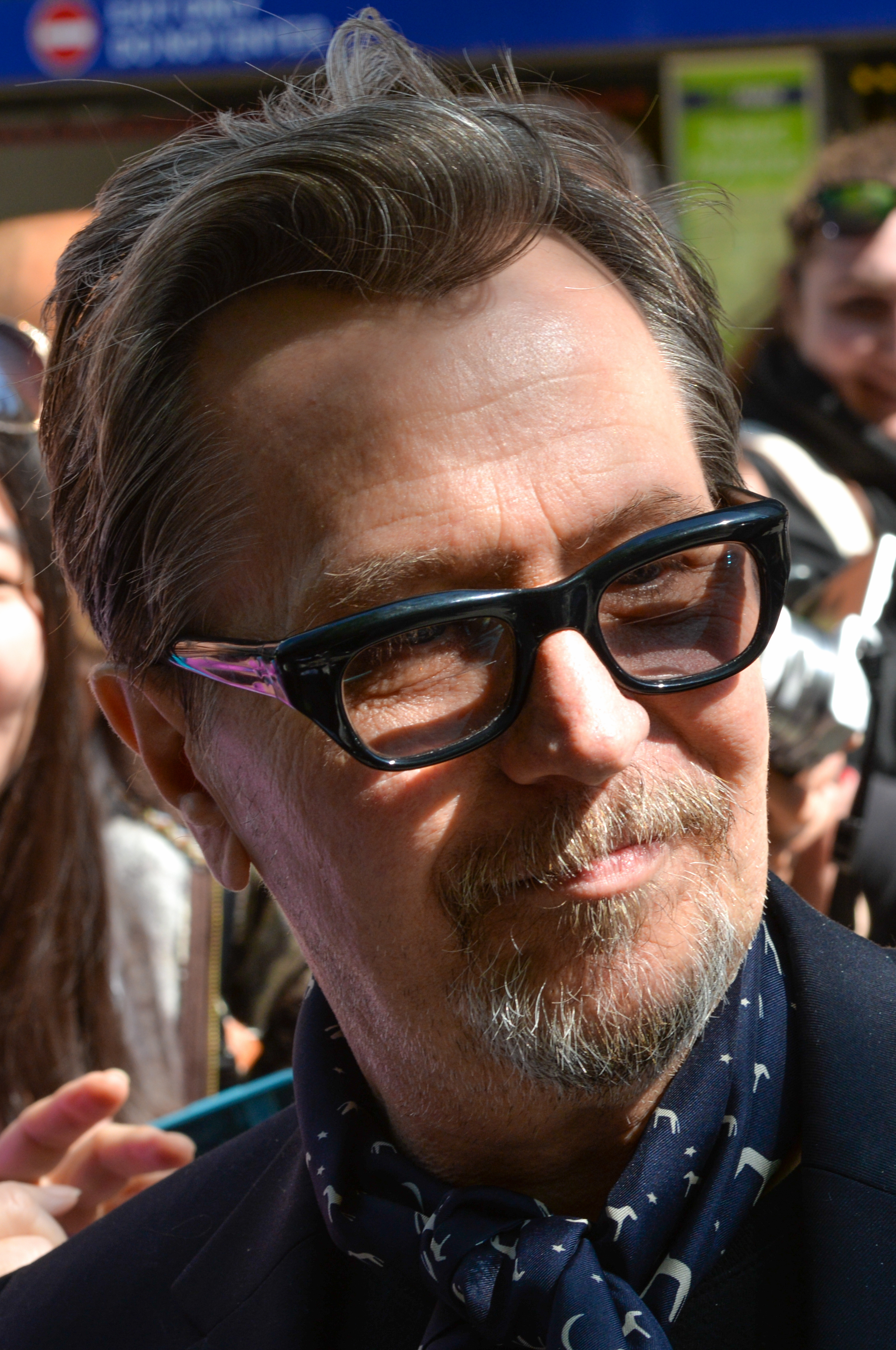
Gary Oldman, Best Actor winner

Frances McDormand, Best Actress winner

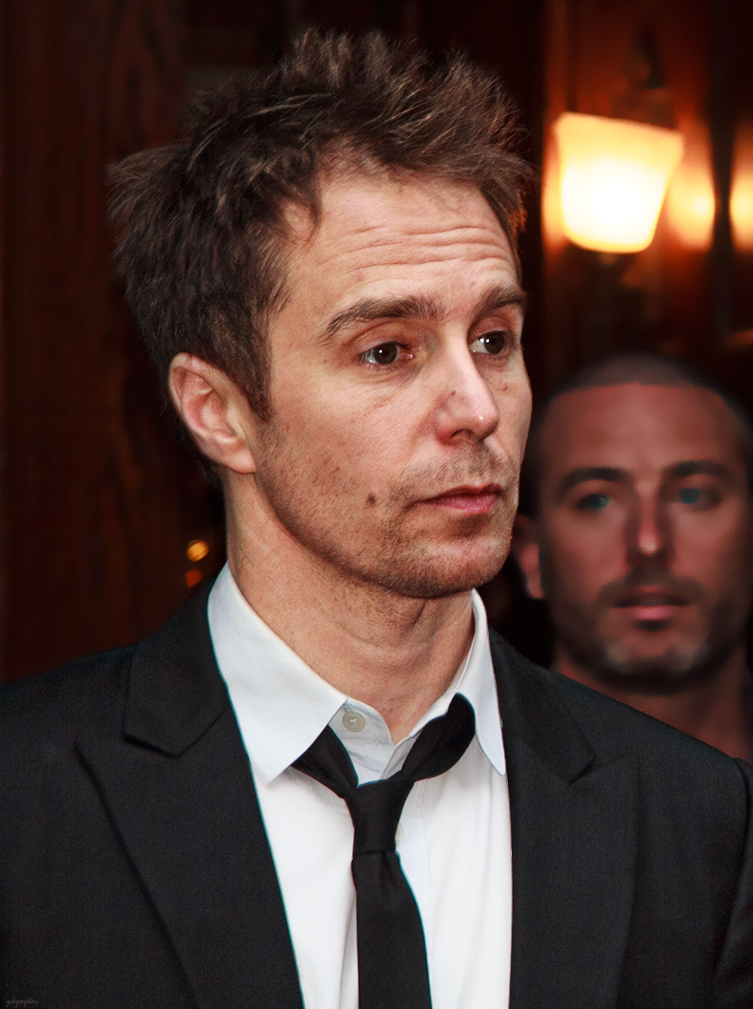
Sam Rockwell, Best Supporting Actor winner

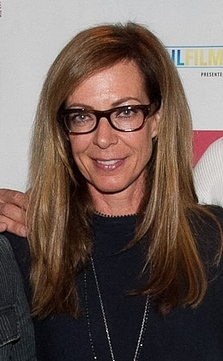
Allison Janney, Best Supporting Actress winner

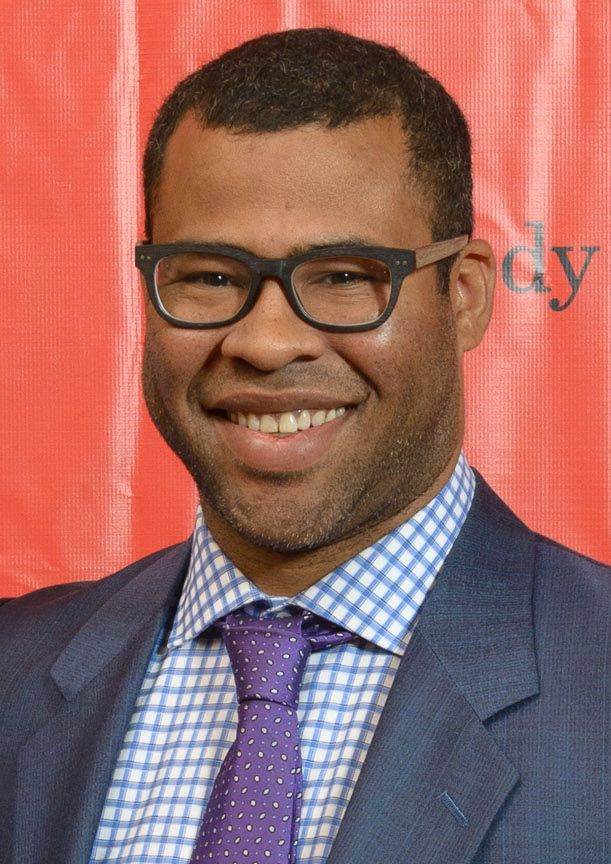
Jordan Peele, Best Original Screenplay winner

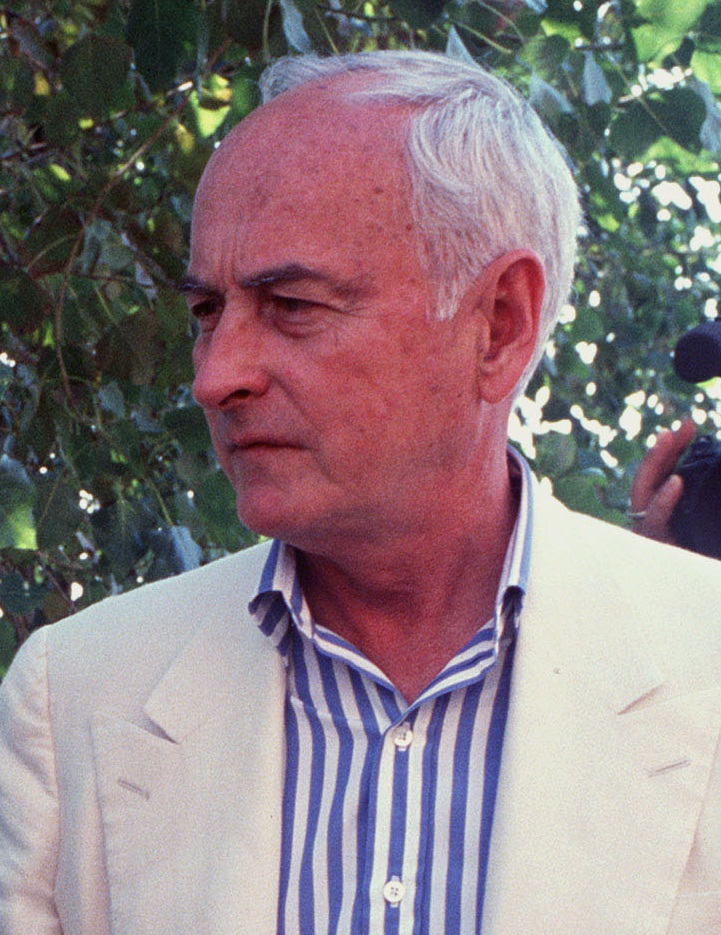
James Ivory, Best Adapted Screenplay winner

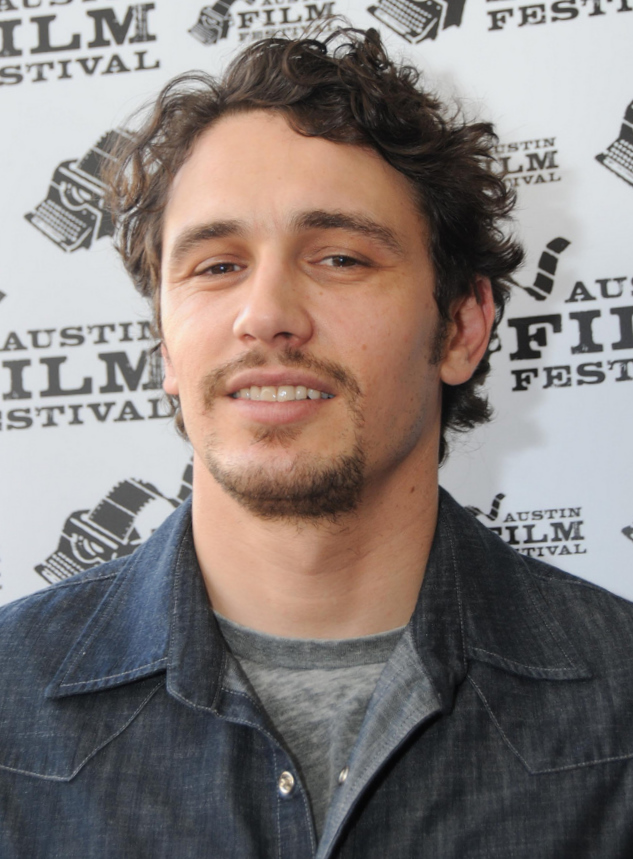
James Franco, Best Actor in a Comedy Movie winner

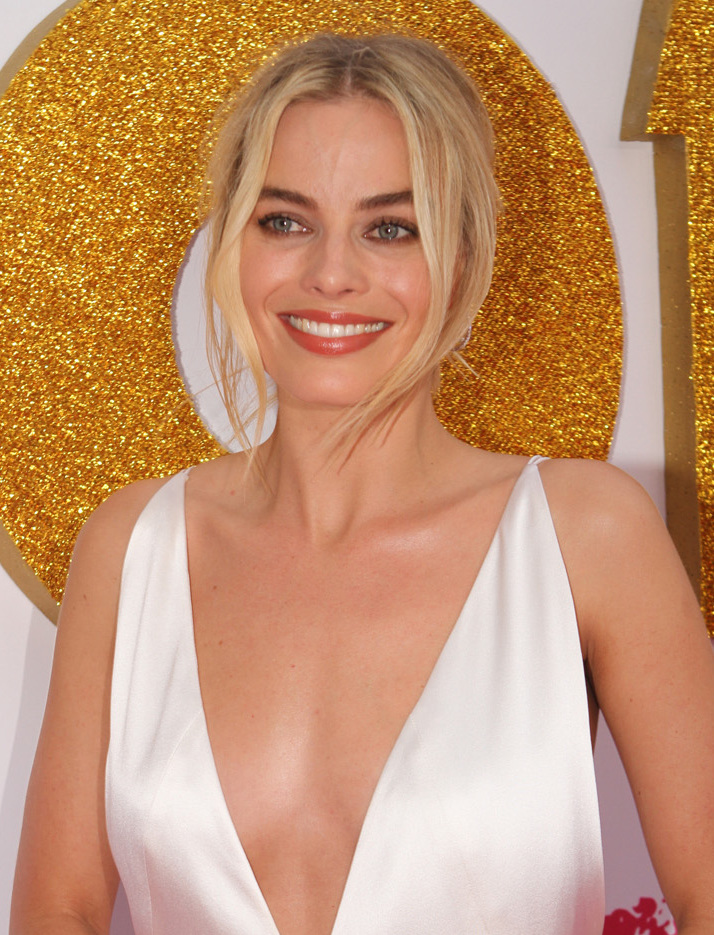
Margot Robbie, Best Actress in a Comedy Movie winner

Best Picture The Shape of Water: The Big Sick; Call Me by Your Name; Darkest Hour; Dunkirk; The Florida Project; Get Out; Lady Bird; The Post; Three Billboards Outside Ebbing, Missouri	Best Director Guillermo del Toro – The Shape of Water: Greta Gerwig – Lady Bird; Luca Guadagnino – Call Me by Your Name; Martin McDonagh – Three Billboards Outside Ebbing, Missouri; Christopher Nolan – Dunkirk; Jordan Peele – Get Out; Steven Spielberg – The Post
Best Actor Gary Oldman – Darkest Hour as Winston Churchill: Timothée Chalamet – Call Me by Your Name as Elio Perlman; Daniel Day-Lewis – Phantom Thread as Reynolds Woodcock; James Franco – The Disaster Artist as Tommy Wiseau; Jake Gyllenhaal – Stronger as Jeff Bauman; Tom Hanks – The Post as Ben Bradlee; Daniel Kaluuya – Get Out as Chris Washington	Best Actress Frances McDormand – Three Billboards Outside Ebbing, Missouri as Mildred Hayes: Jessica Chastain – Molly's Game as Molly Bloom; Sally Hawkins – The Shape of Water as Elisa Esposito; Margot Robbie – I, Tonya as Tonya Harding; Saoirse Ronan – Lady Bird as Christine "Lady Bird" McPherson; Meryl Streep – The Post as Katharine Graham
Best Supporting Actor Sam Rockwell – Three Billboards Outside Ebbing, Missouri as Officer Jason Dixon: Willem Dafoe – The Florida Project as Bobby Hicks; Armie Hammer – Call Me by Your Name as Oliver; Richard Jenkins – The Shape of Water as Giles; Patrick Stewart – Logan as Charles Xavier / Professor X; Michael Stuhlbarg – Call Me by Your Name as Mr. Perlman	Best Supporting Actress Allison Janney – I, Tonya as LaVona Golden: Mary J. Blige – Mudbound as Florence Jackson; Hong Chau – Downsizing as Ngoc Lan Tran; Tiffany Haddish – Girls Trip as Dina; Holly Hunter – The Big Sick as Beth Gardner; Laurie Metcalf – Lady Bird as Marion McPherson; Octavia Spencer – The Shape of Water as Zelda Delilah Fuller
Best Young Actor/Actress Brooklynn Prince – The Florida Project as Moonee: Mckenna Grace – Gifted as Mary Adler; Dafne Keen – Logan as Laura Kinney / X-23; Millicent Simmonds – Wonderstruck as Rose; Jacob Tremblay – Wonder as August "Auggie" Pullman	Best Acting Ensemble Three Billboards Outside Ebbing, Missouri: Dunkirk; Lady Bird; Mudbound; The Post
Best Original Screenplay Jordan Peele – Get Out: Guillermo del Toro and Vanessa Taylor – The Shape of Water; Greta Gerwig – Lady Bird; Emily V. Gordon and Kumail Nanjiani – The Big Sick; Liz Hannah and Josh Singer – The Post; Martin McDonagh – Three Billboards Outside Ebbing, Missouri	Best Adapted Screenplay James Ivory – Call Me by Your Name: Scott Neustadter and Michael H. Weber – The Disaster Artist; Dee Rees and Virgil Williams – Mudbound; Aaron Sorkin – Molly's Game; Jack Thorne, Steven Conrad, and Stephen Chbosky – Wonder
Best Animated Feature Coco: The Breadwinner; Despicable Me 3; The Lego Batman Movie; Loving Vincent	Best Action Movie Wonder Woman: Baby Driver; Logan; Thor: Ragnarok; War for the Planet of the Apes
Best Comedy The Big Sick: The Disaster Artist; Girls Trip; I, Tonya; Lady Bird
Best Actor in a Comedy Movie James Franco – The Disaster Artist as Tommy Wiseau: Steve Carell – Battle of the Sexes as Bobby Riggs; Chris Hemsworth – Thor: Ragnarok as Thor; Kumail Nanjiani – The Big Sick as Kumail; Adam Sandler – The Meyerowitz Stories as Danny Meyerowitz	Best Actress in a Comedy Movie Margot Robbie – I, Tonya as Tonya Harding: Tiffany Haddish – Girls Trip as Dina; Zoe Kazan – The Big Sick as Emily Gardner; Saoirse Ronan – Lady Bird as Christine "Lady Bird" McPherson; Emma Stone – Battle of the Sexes as Billie Jean King
Best Foreign Language Film In the Fade • France / Germany: BPM (Beats per Minute) • France; A Fantastic Woman • Chile / Germany / Spain / United States; First They Killed My Father • Cambodia / United States; The Square • Denmark / France / Germany / Sweden; Thelma • Denmark / France / Norway / Sweden	Best Sci-Fi/Horror Movie Get Out: Blade Runner 2049; It; The Shape of Water
Best Cinematography Roger Deakins – Blade Runner 2049: Dan Laustsen – The Shape of Water; Rachel Morrison – Mudbound; Sayombhu Mukdeeprom – Call Me by Your Name; Hoyte van Hoytema – Dunkirk	Best Editing Paul Machliss and Jonathan Amos – Baby Driver (TIE); Lee Smith – Dunkirk (TIE): Michael Kahn and Sarah Broshar – The Post; Joe Walker – Blade Runner 2049; Sidney Wolinsky – The Shape of Water
Best Costume Design Mark Bridges – Phantom Thread: Renée April – Blade Runner 2049; Jacqueline Durran – Beauty and the Beast; Lindy Hemming – Wonder Woman; Luis Sequeira – The Shape of Water	Best Production Design Paul Denham Austerberry, Shane Vieau, and Jeff Melvin – The Shape of Water: Jim Clay and Rebecca Alleway – Murder on the Orient Express; Nathan Crowley and Gary Fettis – Dunkirk; Dennis Gassner and Alessandra Querzola – Blade Runner 2049; Sarah Greenwood and Katie Spencer – Beauty and the Beast; Mark Tildesley and Véronique Melery – Phantom Thread
Best Score Alexandre Desplat – The Shape of Water: Jonny Greenwood – Phantom Thread; Dario Marianelli – Darkest Hour; Benjamin Wallfisch and Hans Zimmer – Blade Runner 2049; John Williams – The Post; Hans Zimmer – Dunkirk	Best Song "Remember Me" – Coco: "Evermore" – Beauty and the Beast; "Mystery of Love" – Call Me by Your Name; "Stand Up for Something" – Marshall; "This Is Me" – The Greatest Showman
Best Hair and Makeup Darkest Hour: Beauty and the Beast; I, Tonya; The Shape of Water; Wonder	Best Visual Effects War for the Planet of the Apes: Blade Runner 2049; Dunkirk; The Shape of Water; Thor: Ragnarok; Wonder Woman

=== Television ===
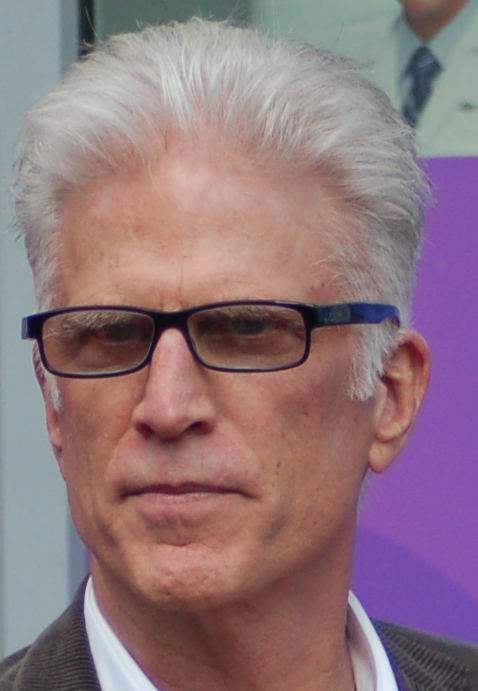
Ted Danson, Best Actor in a Comedy Series winner

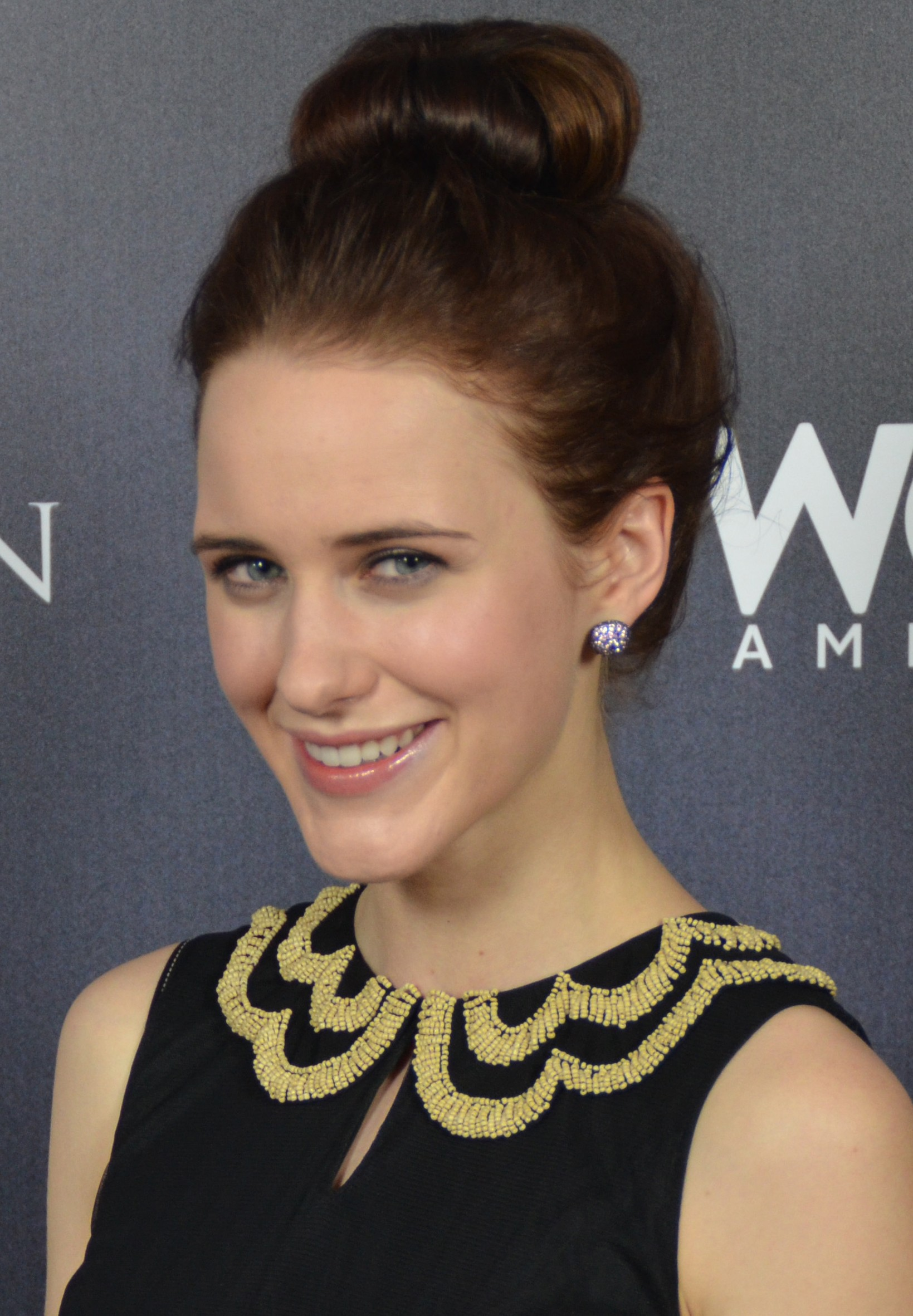
Rachel Brosnahan, Best Actress in a Comedy Series winner

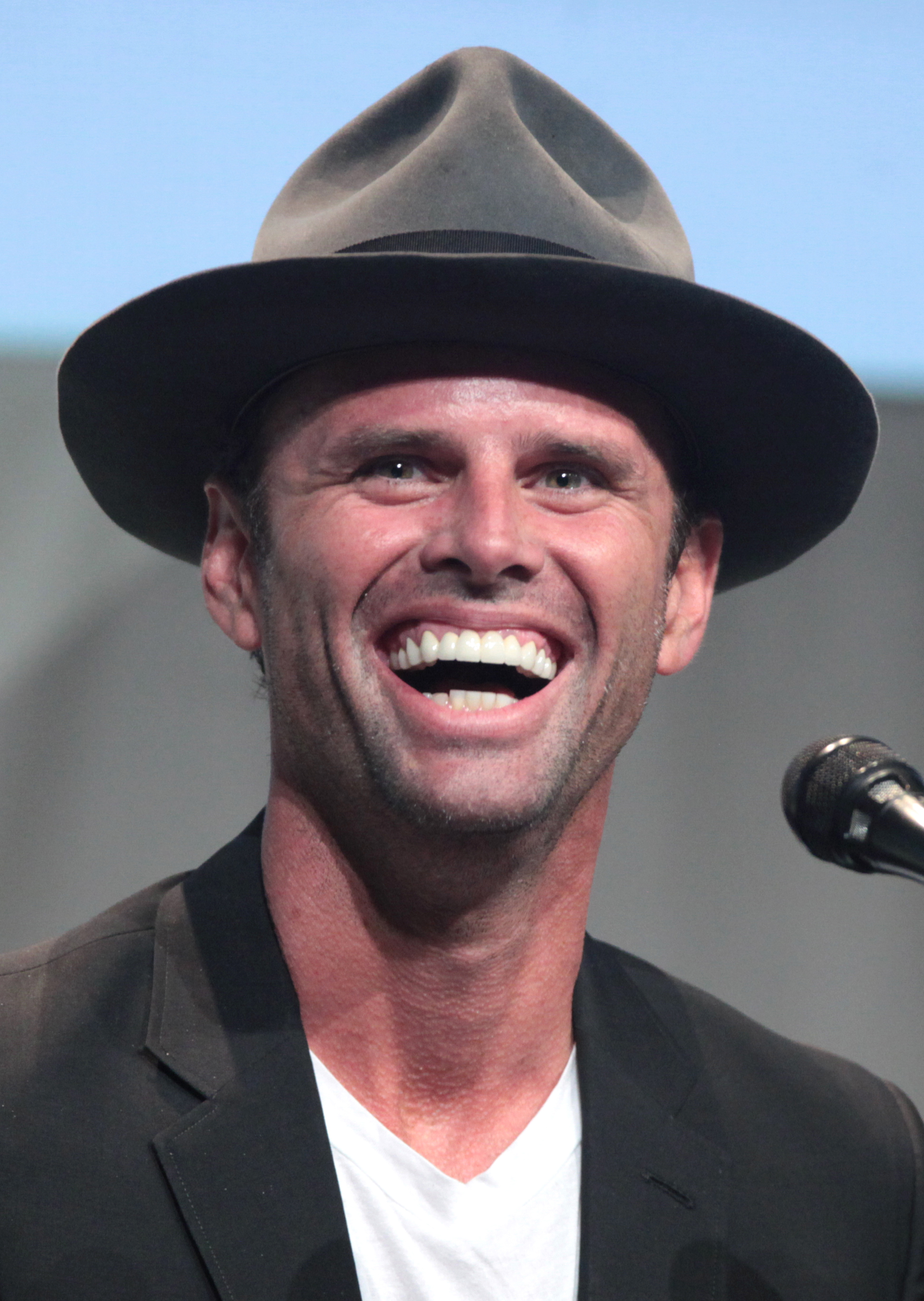
Walton Goggins, Best Supporting Actor in a Comedy Series winner

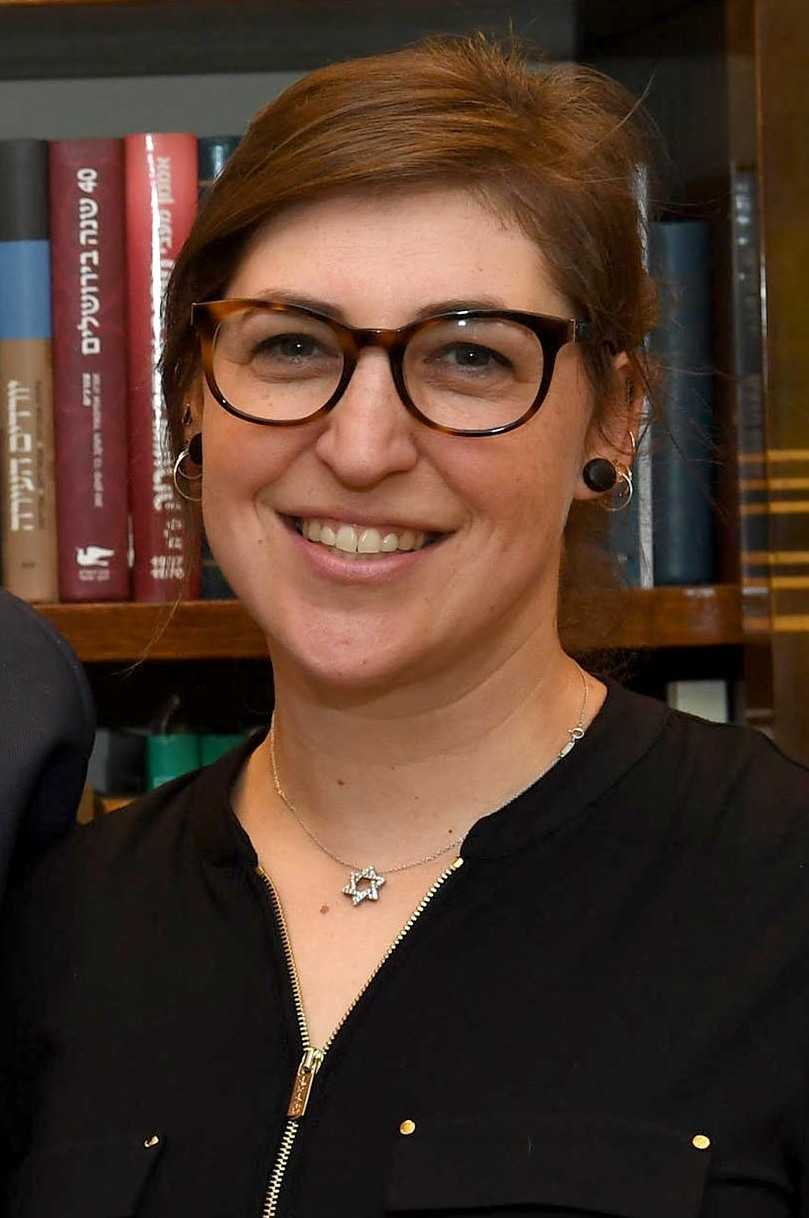
Mayim Bialik, Best Supporting Actress in a Comedy Series winner

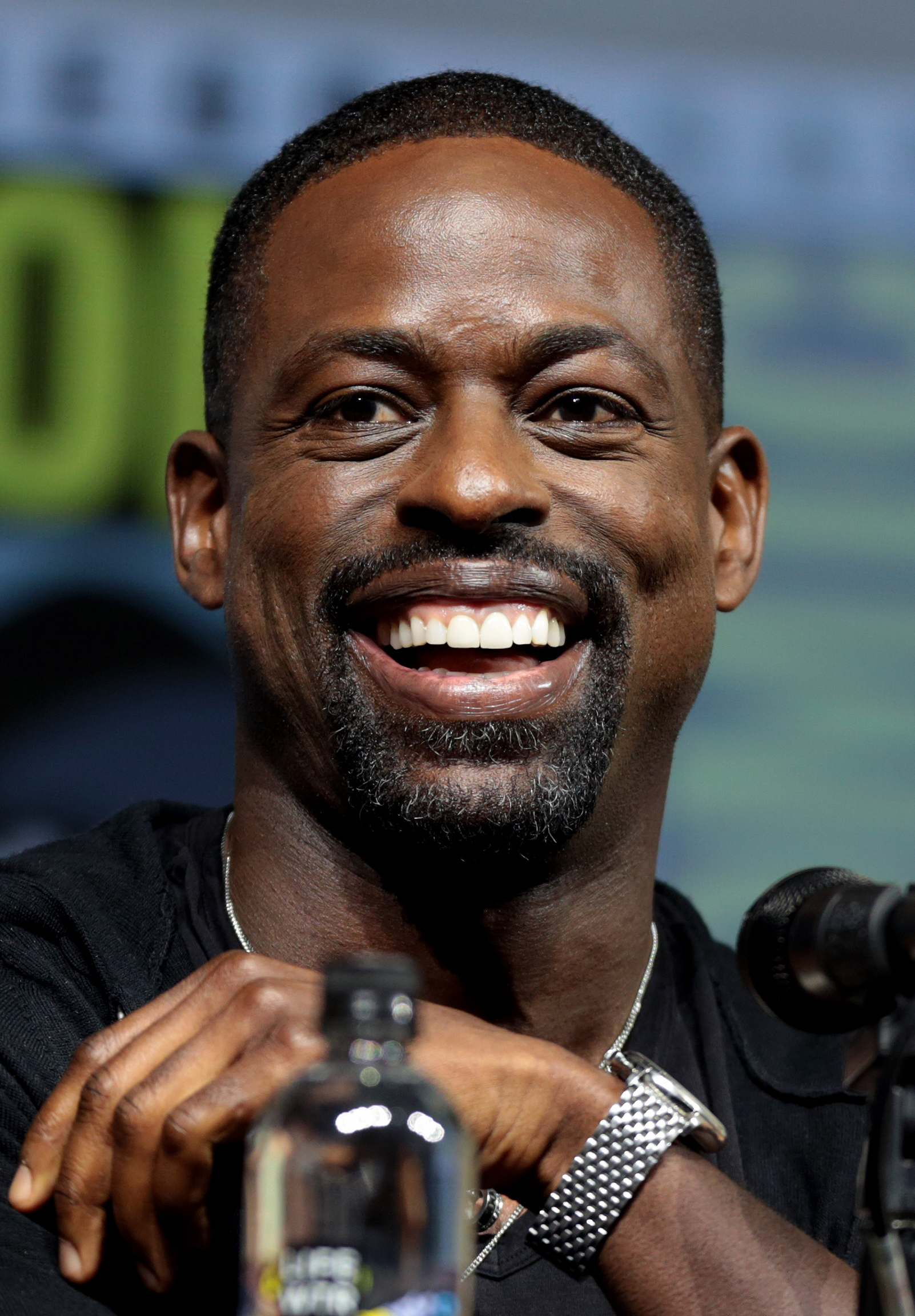
Sterling K. Brown, Best Actor in a Drama Series winner

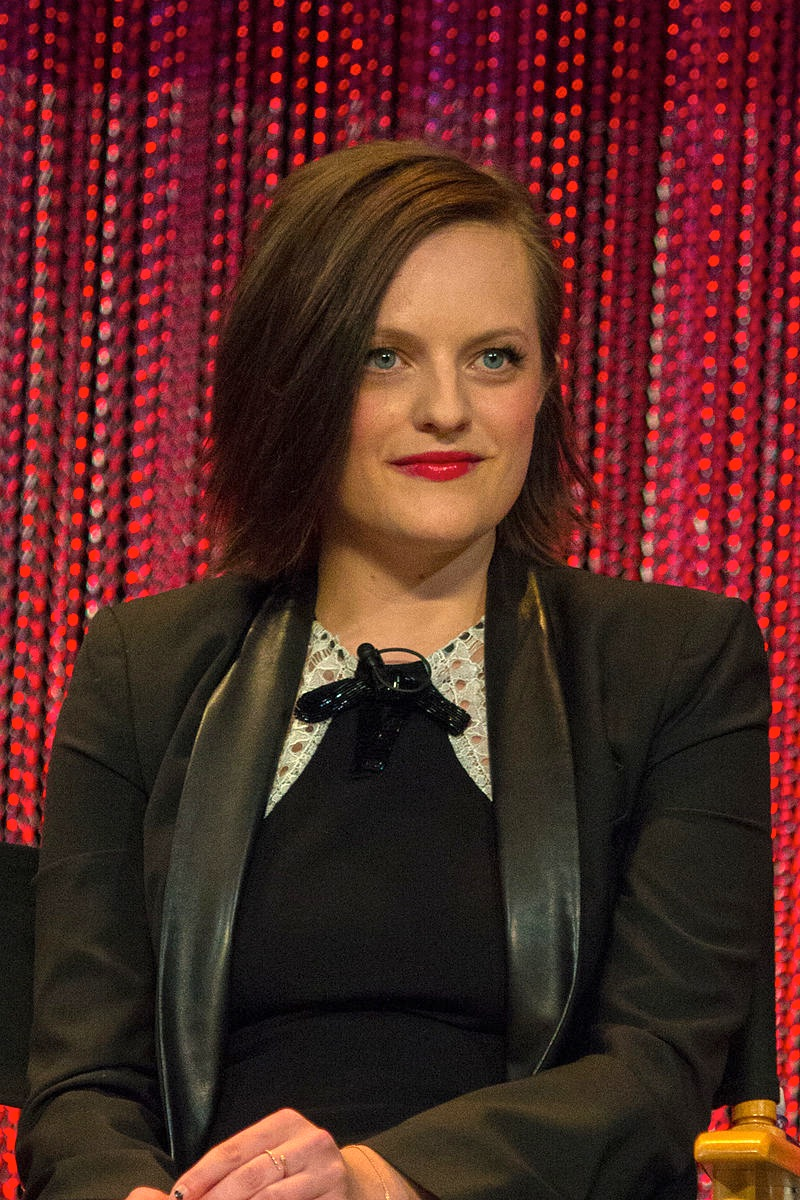
Elisabeth Moss, Best Actress in a Drama Series winner

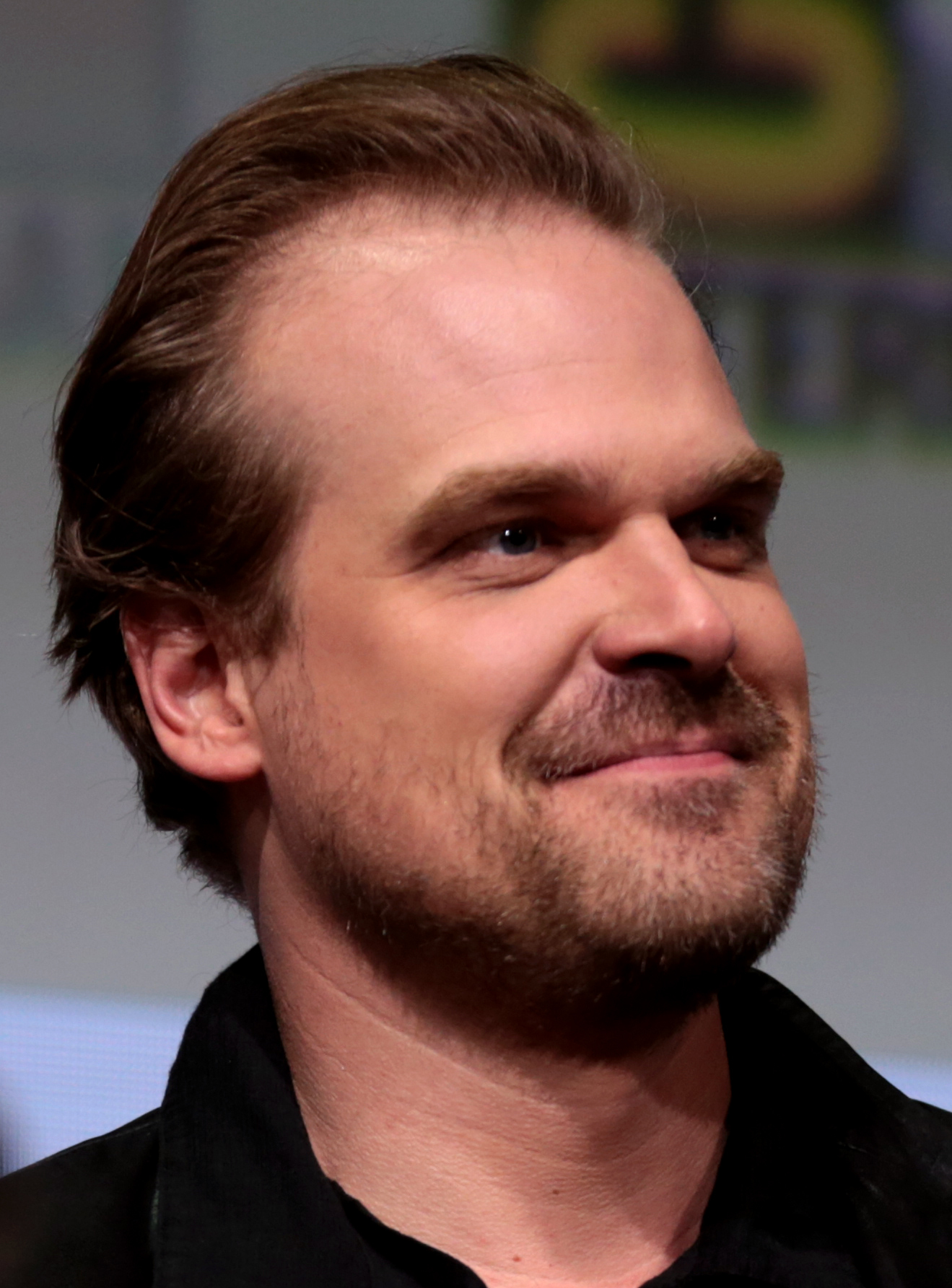
David Harbour, Best Supporting Actor in a Drama Series winner

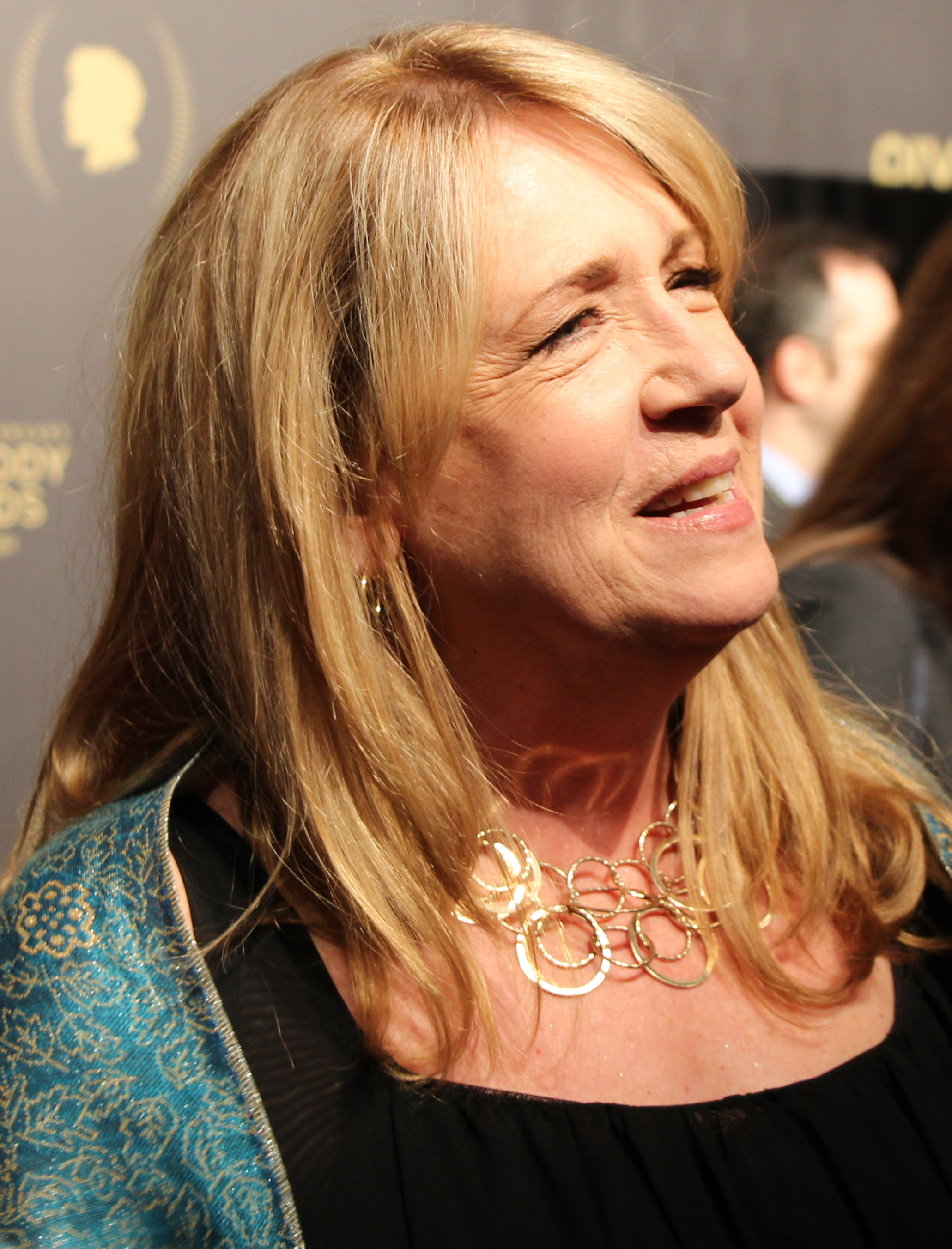
Ann Dowd, Best Supporting Actress in a Drama Series winner

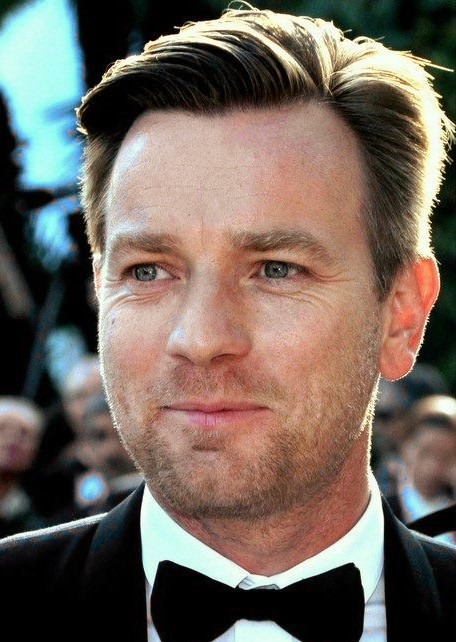
Ewan McGregor, Best Actor in a Movie Made for TV or Limited Series winner

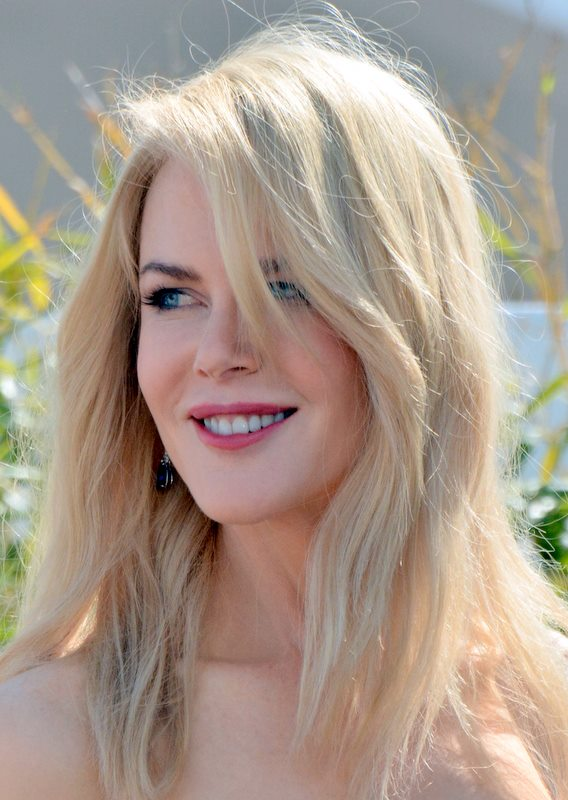
Nicole Kidman, Best Actress in a Movie Made for TV or Limited Series winner

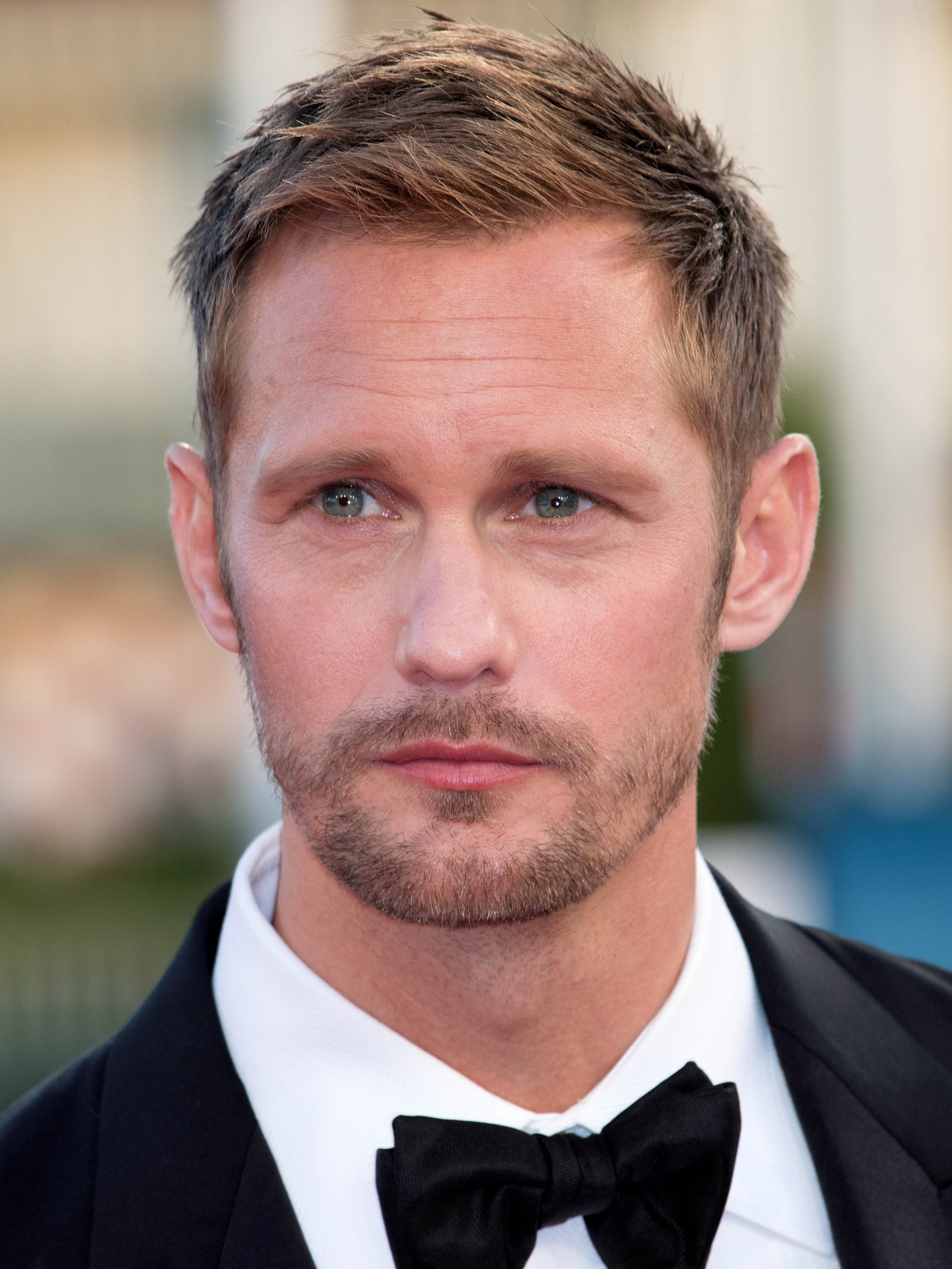
Alexander Skarsgård, Best Supporting Actor in a Movie Made for TV or Limited Series winner

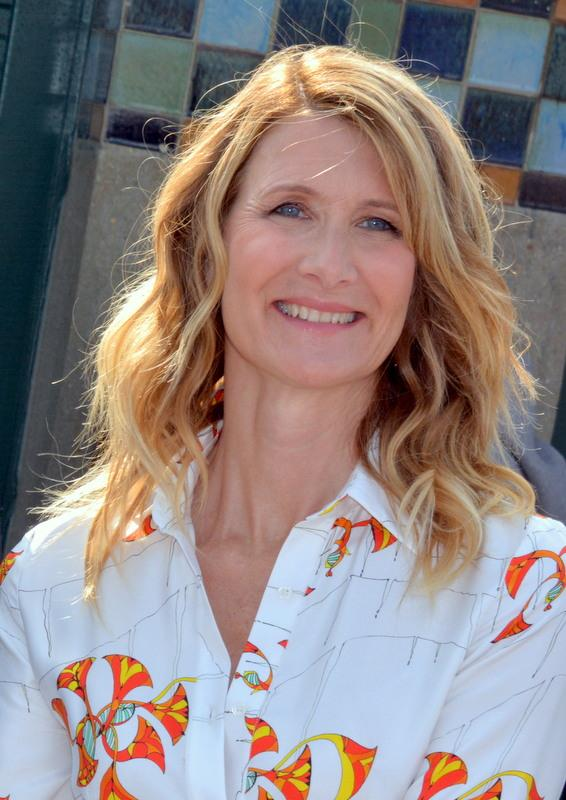
Laura Dern, Best Supporting Actress in a Movie Made for TV or Limited Series winner

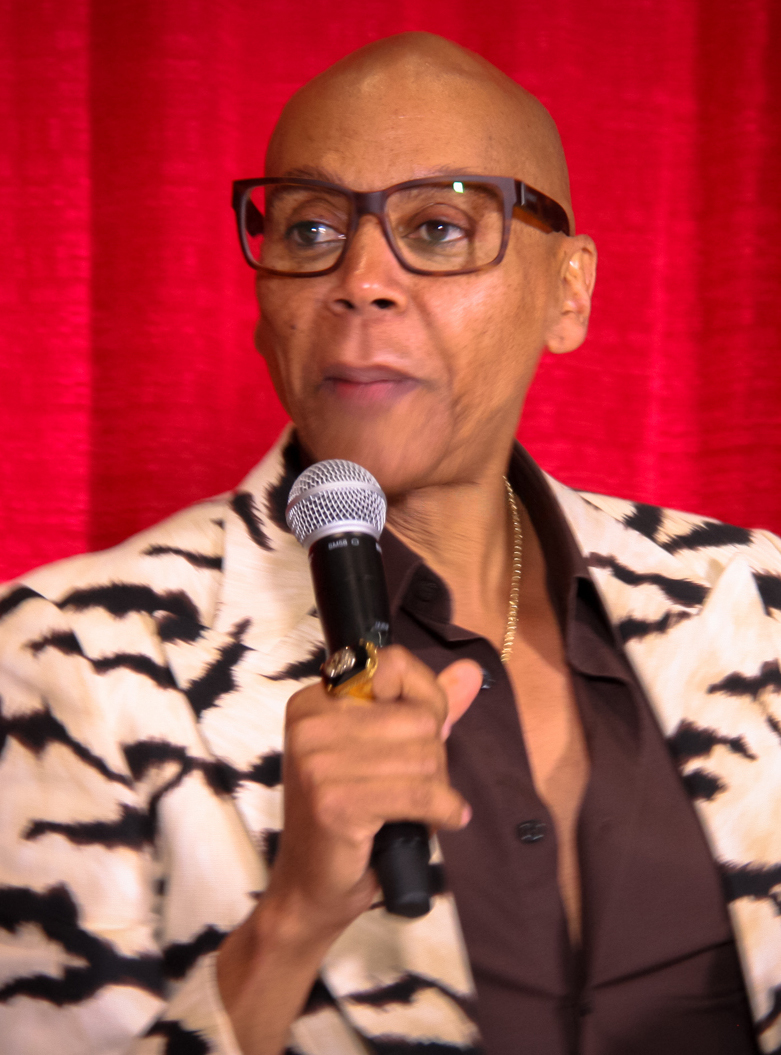
RuPaul, Best Reality Show Host winner

Best Series
Best Comedy Series	Best Drama Series
The Marvelous Mrs. Maisel (Amazon): The Big Bang Theory (CBS); Black-ish (ABC); GLOW (Netflix); Modern Family (ABC); Orange is the New Black (Netflix)	The Handmaid's Tale (Hulu): American Gods (Starz); Better Call Saul (AMC); Game of Thrones (HBO); Stranger Things (Netflix); This Is Us (NBC)
Best Limited Series	Best Movie Made for TV
Big Little Lies (HBO): American Vandal (Netflix); Fargo (FX); Feud: Bette and Joan (FX); Godless (Netflix); The Long Road Home (Nat Geo)	The Wizard of Lies (HBO): Flint (Lifetime); I Am Elizabeth Smart (Lifetime); The Immortal Life of Henrietta Lacks (HBO); Sherlock: The Lying Detective (PBS)
Best Animated Series
Rick and Morty (Adult Swim): Archer (FX); Bob's Burgers (Fox); Family Guy (Fox); The Simpsons (Fox); South Park (Comedy Central)
Best Acting in a Comedy Series
Best Actor	Best Actress
Ted Danson as Michael – The Good Place: Anthony Anderson as Andre "Dre" Johnson Sr. – Black-ish; Aziz Ansari as Dev Shah – Master of None; Hank Azaria as Jim Brockmire – Brockmire; Thomas Middleditch as Richard Hendricks – Silicon Valley; Randall Park as Louis Huang – Fresh Off the Boat	Rachel Brosnahan as Miriam "Midge" Maisel – The Marvelous Mrs. Maisel: Kristen Bell as Eleanor Shellstrop – The Good Place; Alison Brie as Ruth "Zoya the Destroya" Wilder – GLOW; Sutton Foster as Liza Miller – Younger; Ellie Kemper as Kimmy Schmidt – Unbreakable Kimmy Schmidt; Constance Wu as Jessica Huang – Fresh Off the Boat
Best Supporting Actor	Best Supporting Actress
Walton Goggins as Lee Russell – Vice Principals: Tituss Burgess as Titus Andromedon – Unbreakable Kimmy Schmidt; Sean Hayes as Jack McFarland – Will & Grace; Marc Maron as Sam Sylvia – GLOW; Kumail Nanjiani as Dinesh Chugtai – Silicon Valley; Ed O'Neill as Jay Pritchett – Modern Family	Mayim Bialik as Dr. Amy Farrah Fowler – The Big Bang Theory: Alex Borstein as Susie Myerson – The Marvelous Mrs. Maisel; Betty Gilpin as Debbie "Liberty Belle" Eagan – GLOW; Jenifer Lewis as Ruby Johnson – Black-ish; Alessandra Mastronardi as Francesca – Master of None; Rita Moreno as Lydia Riera – One Day at a Time
Best Acting in a Drama Series
Best Actor	Best Actress
Sterling K. Brown as Randall Pearson – This Is Us: Paul Giamatti as Charles "Chuck" Rhoades Jr. – Billions; Freddie Highmore as Norman Bates – Bates Motel; Ian McShane as Mr. Wednesday – American Gods; Bob Odenkirk as Jimmy McGill – Better Call Saul; Liev Schreiber as Ray Donovan – Ray Donovan	Elisabeth Moss as Offred / June Osborne – The Handmaid's Tale: Caitríona Balfe as Claire Fraser – Outlander; Christine Baranski as Diane Lockhart – The Good Fight; Claire Foy as Queen Elizabeth II – The Crown; Tatiana Maslany as Various Characters – Orphan Black; Robin Wright as Claire Underwood – House of Cards
Best Supporting Actor	Best Supporting Actress
David Harbour as Jim Hopper – Stranger Things: Bobby Cannavale as Irving – Mr. Robot; Asia Kate Dillon as Taylor Amber Mason – Billions; Peter Dinklage as Tyrion Lannister – Game of Thrones; Delroy Lindo as Adrian Boseman – The Good Fight; Michael McKean as Chuck McGill – Better Call Saul	Ann Dowd as Aunt Lydia – The Handmaid's Tale: Gillian Anderson as Media – American Gods; Emilia Clarke as Daenerys Targaryen – Game of Thrones; Cush Jumbo as Lucca Quinn – The Good Fight; Margo Martindale as Audrey Bernhardt – Sneaky Pete; Chrissy Metz as Kate Pearson – This Is Us
Best Acting in a Movie Made for TV or Limited Series
Best Actor	Best Actress
Ewan McGregor as Emmit and Ray Stussy – Fargo: Jeff Daniels as Frank Griffin – Godless; Robert De Niro as Bernie Madoff – The Wizard of Lies; Jack O'Connell as Roy Goode – Godless; Evan Peters as Kai Anderson – American Horror Story: Cult; Bill Pullman as Detective Harry Ambrose – The Sinner; Jimmy Tatro as Dylan Maxwell – American Vandal	Nicole Kidman as Celeste Wright – Big Little Lies: Jessica Biel as Cora Tannetti – The Sinner; Alana Boden as Elizabeth Smart – I Am Elizabeth Smart; Carrie Coon as Gloria Burgle – Fargo; Jessica Lange as Joan Crawford – Feud: Bette and Joan; Reese Witherspoon as Madeline Martha Mackenzie – Big Little Lies
Best Supporting Actor	Best Supporting Actress
Alexander Skarsgård as Perry Wright – Big Little Lies: Johnny Flynn as Young Albert Einstein – Genius; Benito Martinez as Luis Salazar – American Crime; Alfred Molina as Robert Aldrich – Feud: Bette and Joan; David Thewlis as V. M. Varga – Fargo; Stanley Tucci as Jack L. Warner – Feud: Bette and Joan	Laura Dern as Renata Klein – Big Little Lies: Judy Davis as Hedda Hopper – Feud: Bette and Joan; Jackie Hoffman as Mamacita – Feud: Bette and Joan; Regina King as Kimara Walters – American Crime; Michelle Pfeiffer as Ruth Madoff – The Wizard of Lies; Mary Elizabeth Winstead as Nikki Swango – Fargo
Reality & Variety
Best Structured Reality Series	Best Unstructured Reality Series
Shark Tank (ABC): The Carbonaro Effect (truTV); Fixer Upper (HGTV); Lip Sync Battle (Spike); Undercover Boss (CBS); Who Do You Think You Are? (TLC)	Born This Way (A&E): Ice Road Truckers (History); Intervention (A&E); Live PD (A&E); Teen Mom (MTV); United Shades of America (CNN)
Best Reality Competition Series	Best Reality Show Host
The Voice (NBC): America's Got Talent (NBC); Chopped (Food Network); Dancing with the Stars (ABC); Project Runway (Lifetime); RuPaul's Drag Race (VH1)	RuPaul – RuPaul's Drag Race: Ted Allen – Chopped; Tyra Banks – America's Got Talent; Tom Bergeron – Dancing with the Stars; Cat Deeley – So You Think You Can Dance; Chip Gaines and Joanna Gaines – Fixer Upper
Best Talk Show
Jimmy Kimmel Live! (ABC): The Daily Show with Trevor Noah (Comedy Central); Real Time with Bill Maher (HBO); The Late Late Show with James Corden (CBS); The Tonight Show Starring Jimmy Fallon (NBC); Watch What Happens Live with Andy Cohen (Bravo)

=== #SeeHer Award ===
Gal Gadot

== Films with multiple nominations and wins ==
The following twenty-six films received multiple nominations:

Film	Nominations
The Shape of Water	14
Call Me by Your Name	8
Dunkirk	8
Lady Bird	8
The Post	8
Blade Runner 2049	7
The Big Sick	6
Three Billboards Outside Ebbing, Missouri	6
Get Out	5
I, Tonya	5
Beauty and the Beast	4
Darkest Hour	4
The Disaster Artist	4
Mudbound	4
Phantom Thread	4
The Florida Project	3
Girls Trip	3
Logan	3
Thor: Ragnarok	3
Wonder	3
Wonder Woman	3
Baby Driver	2
Battle of the Sexes	2
Coco	2
Molly's Game	2
War for the Planet of the Apes	2

The following six films received multiple awards:

Film	Awards
The Shape of Water	4
Three Billboards Outside Ebbing, Missouri	3
Coco	2
Darkest Hour	2
Get Out	2
I, Tonya	2

== Television programs with multiple nominations and wins ==
The following programs received multiple nominations:

Program	Network	Category	Nominations
Feud: Bette and Joan	FX	Limited	6
Big Little Lies	HBO	Limited	5
Fargo	FX	Limited	5
GLOW	Netflix	Comedy	4
American Gods	Starz	Drama	3
Black-ish	ABC	Comedy	3
Game of Thrones	HBO	Drama	3
Godless	Netflix	Limited	3
The Good Fight	CBS All Access	Drama	3
The Handmaid's Tale	Hulu	Drama	3
The Marvelous Mrs. Maisel	Amazon	Comedy	3
This Is Us	NBC	Drama	3
The Wizard of Lies	HBO	Movie	3
American Crime	ABC	Limited	2
American Vandal	Netflix	Limited	2
America's Got Talent	NBC	Reality – Competition	2
Better Call Saul	AMC	Drama	2
The Big Bang Theory	CBS	Comedy	2
Billions	Showtime	Drama	2
Chopped	Food Network	Reality – Competition (Note: Briefly categorized as Structured Reality)	2
The Crown	Netflix	Drama	2
Dancing with the Stars	ABC	Reality – Competition	2
Fixer Upper	HGTV	Reality – Structured	2
Fresh Off the Boat	ABC	Comedy	2
The Good Place	NBC	Comedy	2
I Am Elizabeth Smart	Lifetime	Movie	2
Master of None	Netflix	Comedy	2
Modern Family	ABC	Comedy	2
RuPaul's Drag Race	VH1	Reality – Competition	2
Silicon Valley	HBO	Comedy	2
The Sinner	USA	Limited	2
Stranger Things	Netflix	Drama	2
Unbreakable Kimmy Schmidt	Netflix	Comedy	2

The following programs received multiple awards:

Program	Network	Category	Awards
Big Little Lies	HBO	Limited	4
The Handmaid's Tale	Hulu	Drama	3
The Marvelous Mrs. Maisel	Amazon	Comedy	2
