= 1st Critics' Choice Television Awards =

2011 American television awards

- Date: June 20, 2011
- Location: The Beverly Hilton, Los Angeles
- Country: United States
- Presented by: Broadcast Television Journalists Association
- Hosted by: Cat Deeley

Highlights
- Most awards: Mad Men (3)
- Most nominations: Modern Family (6)
- Best Comedy Series: Modern Family
- Best Drama Series: Mad Men
- Website: www.criticschoice.com

Television/radio coverage
- Network: ReelzChannel

The inaugural Critics' Choice Television Awards ceremony, presented by the Broadcast Television Journalists Association (BTJA), honored the best in primetime television programming from June 1, 2010, to May 31, 2011, and was held on June 20, 2011, at The Beverly Hilton in Los Angeles, California. The ceremony was live-streamed on VH1's website and was televised on ReelzChannel in an edited format two days after the ceremony occurred. Cat Deeley served as the host of the ceremony. The winners were announced on June 20, 2011. Danny DeVito received the Critics' Choice Television Icon Award.

== Winners and nominees ==
Winners are listed first and highlighted in boldface:

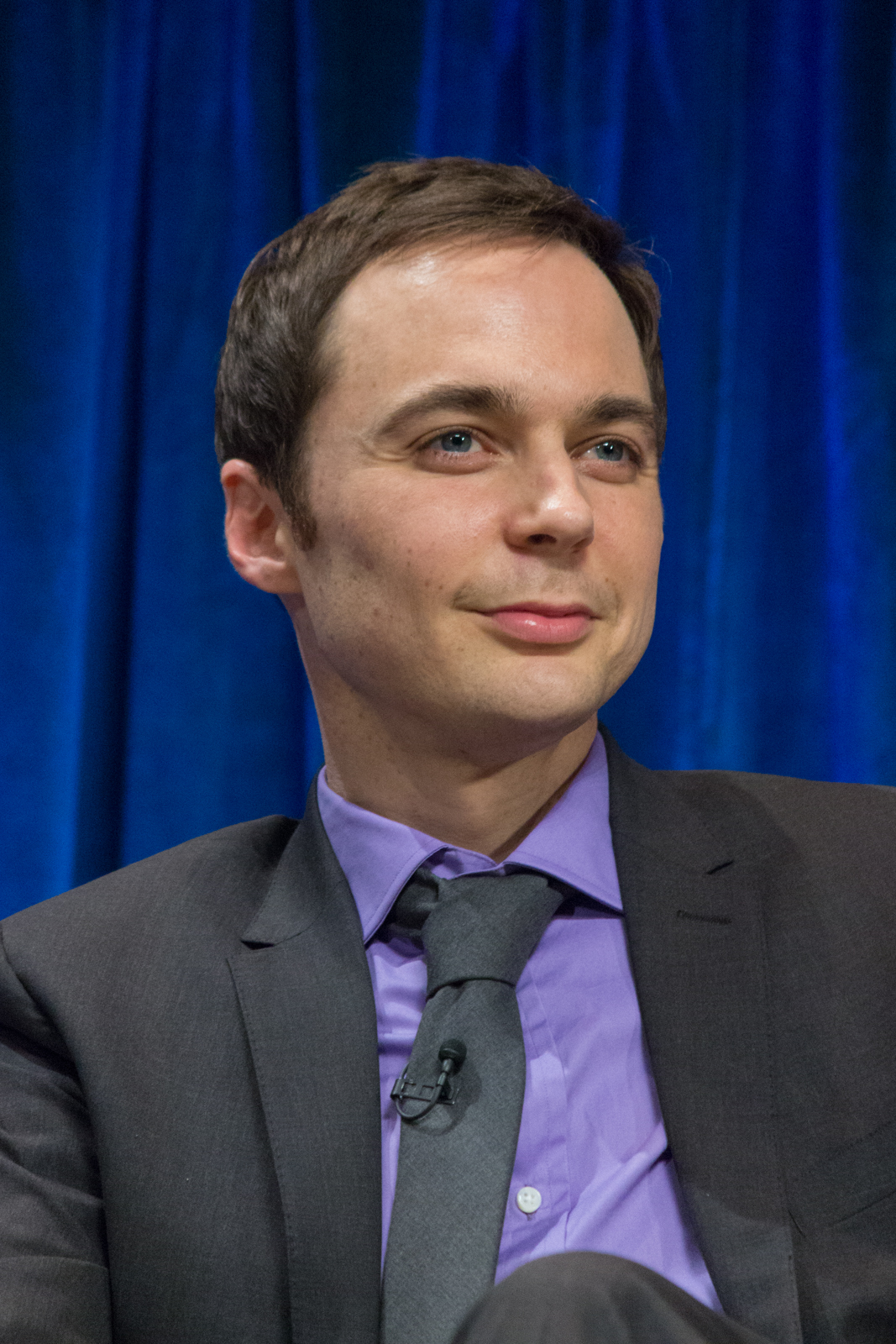
Jim Parsons, Best Actor in a Comedy Series winner

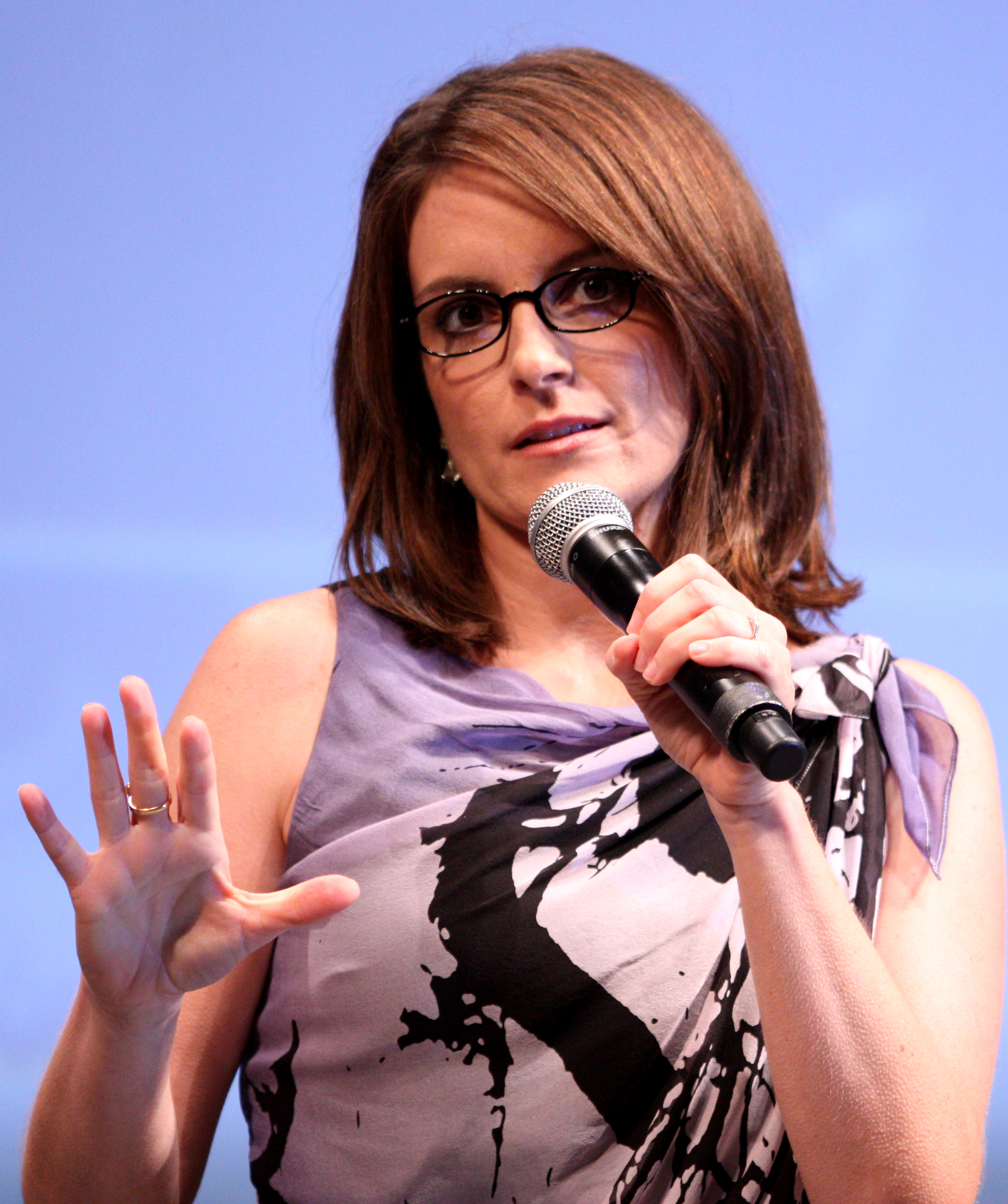
Tina Fey, Best Actress in a Comedy Series winner

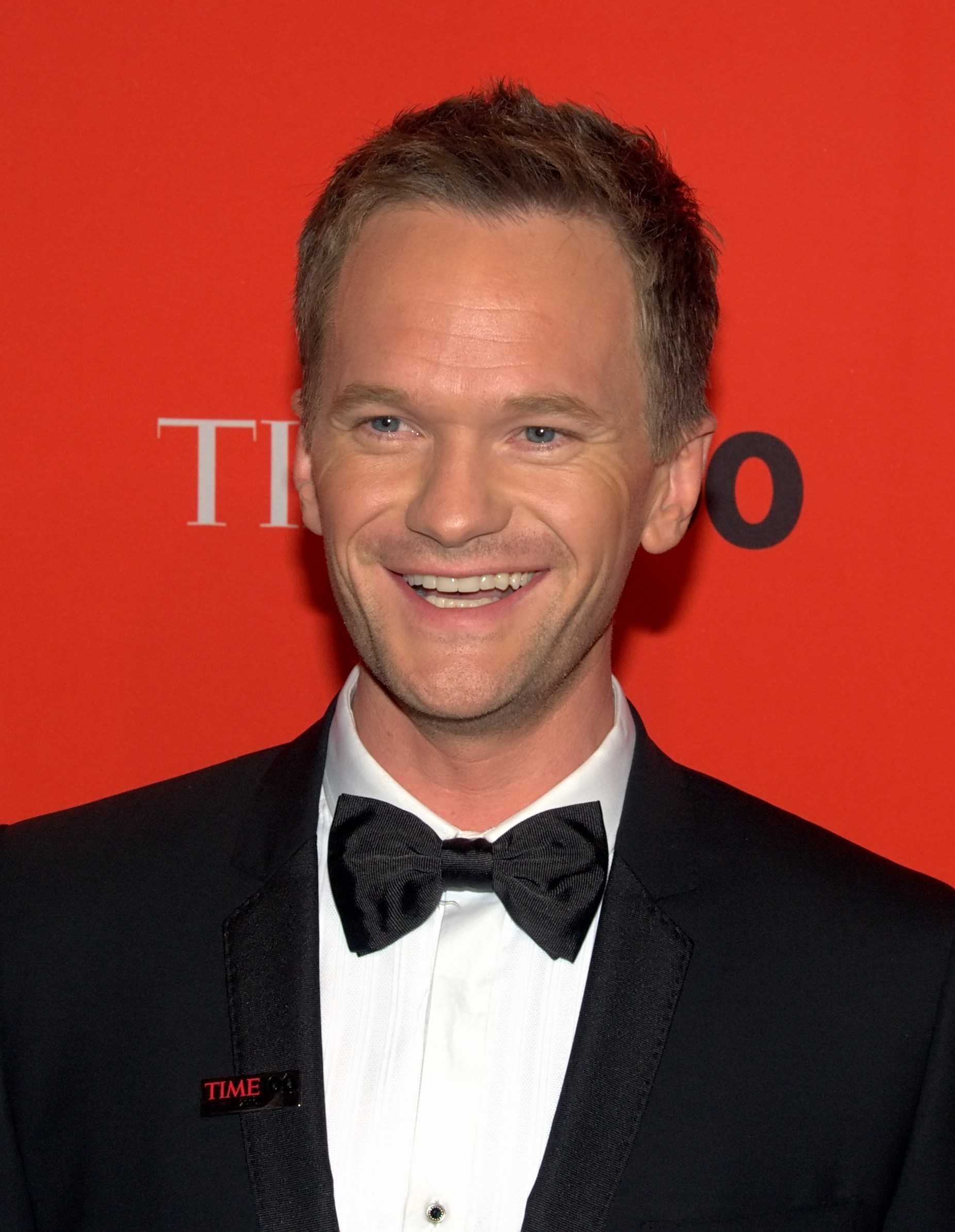
Neil Patrick Harris, Best Supporting Actor in a Comedy Series winner

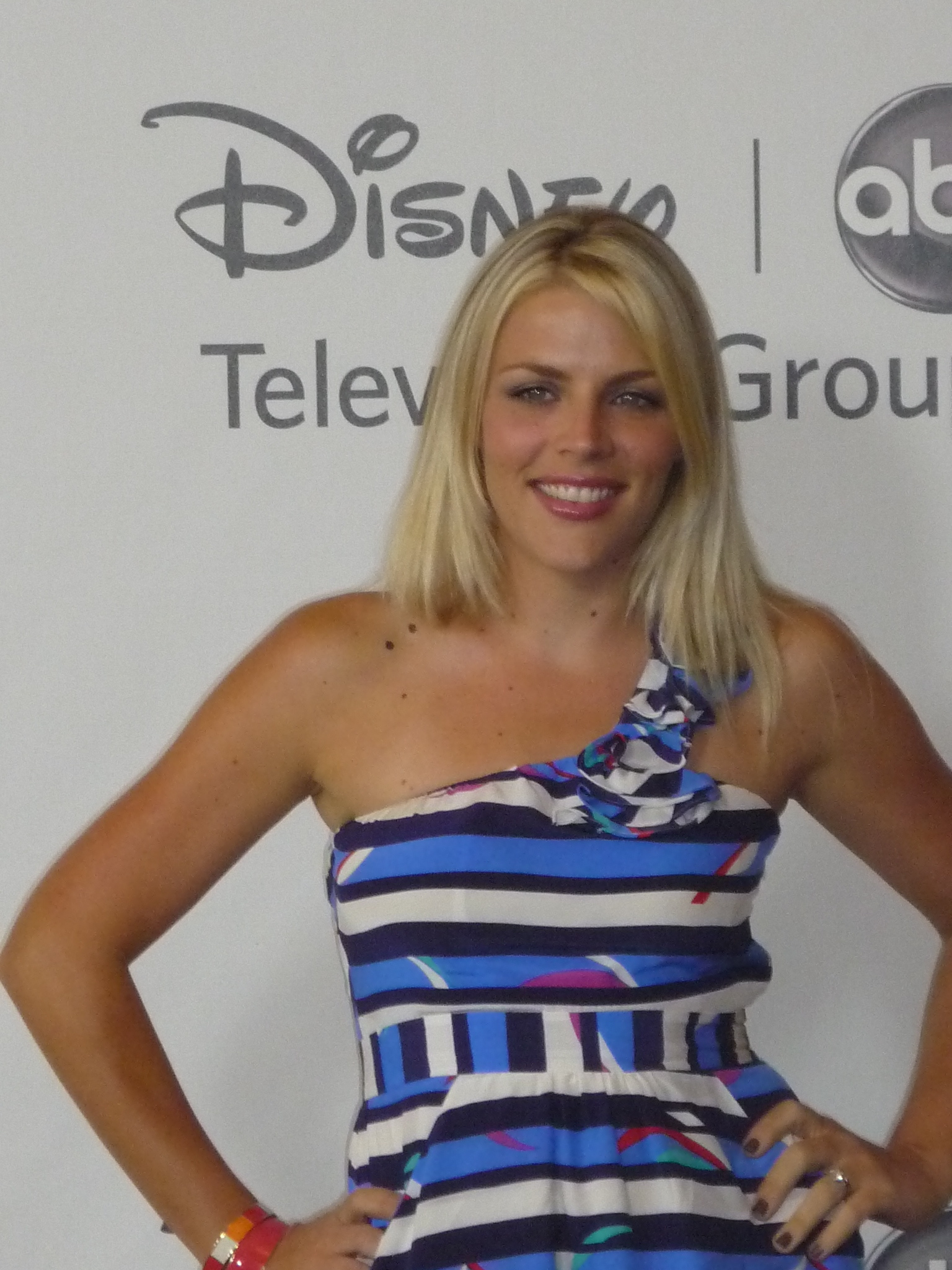
Busy Philipps, Best Supporting Actress in a Comedy Series winner

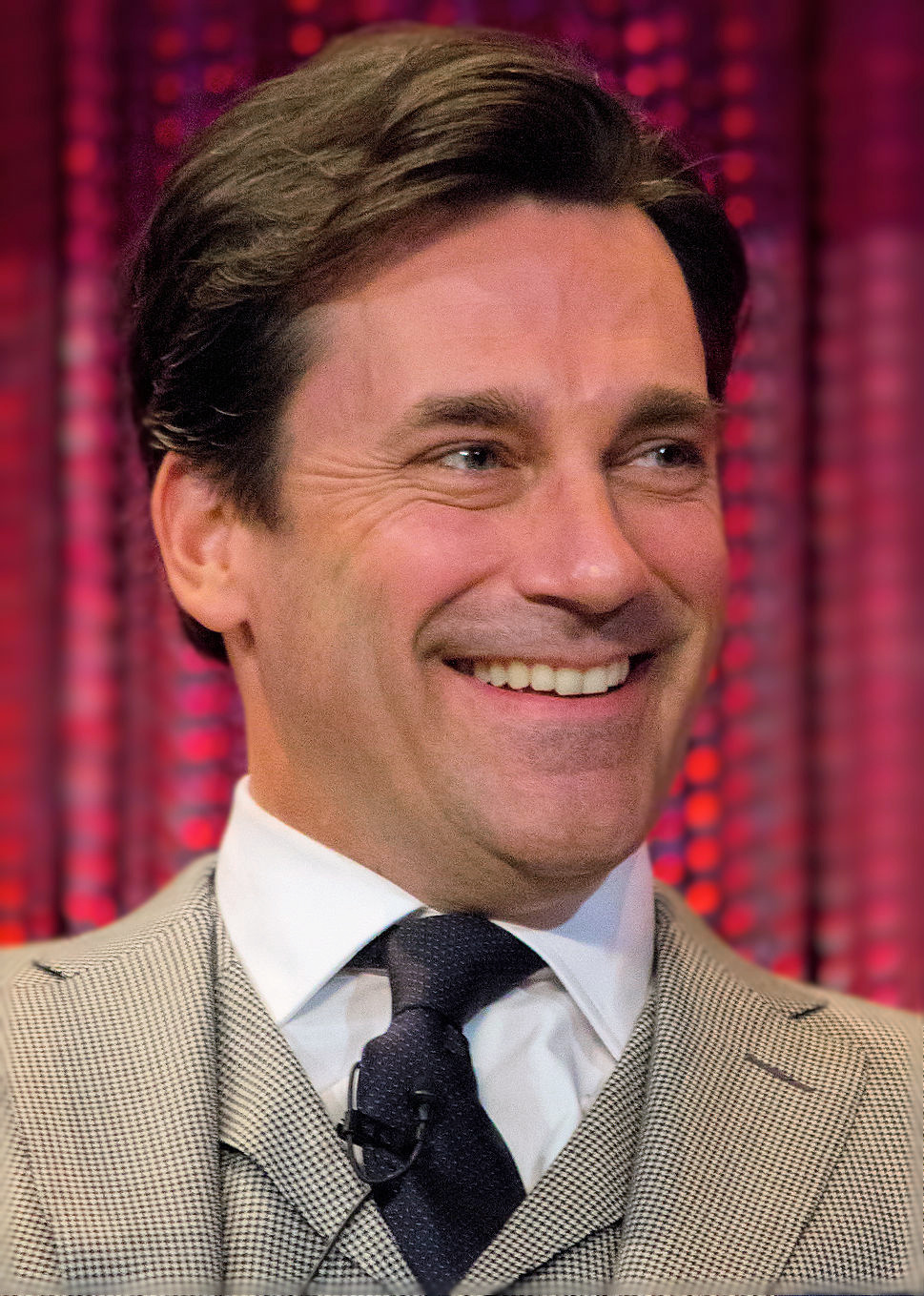
Jon Hamm, Best Actor in a Drama Series winner

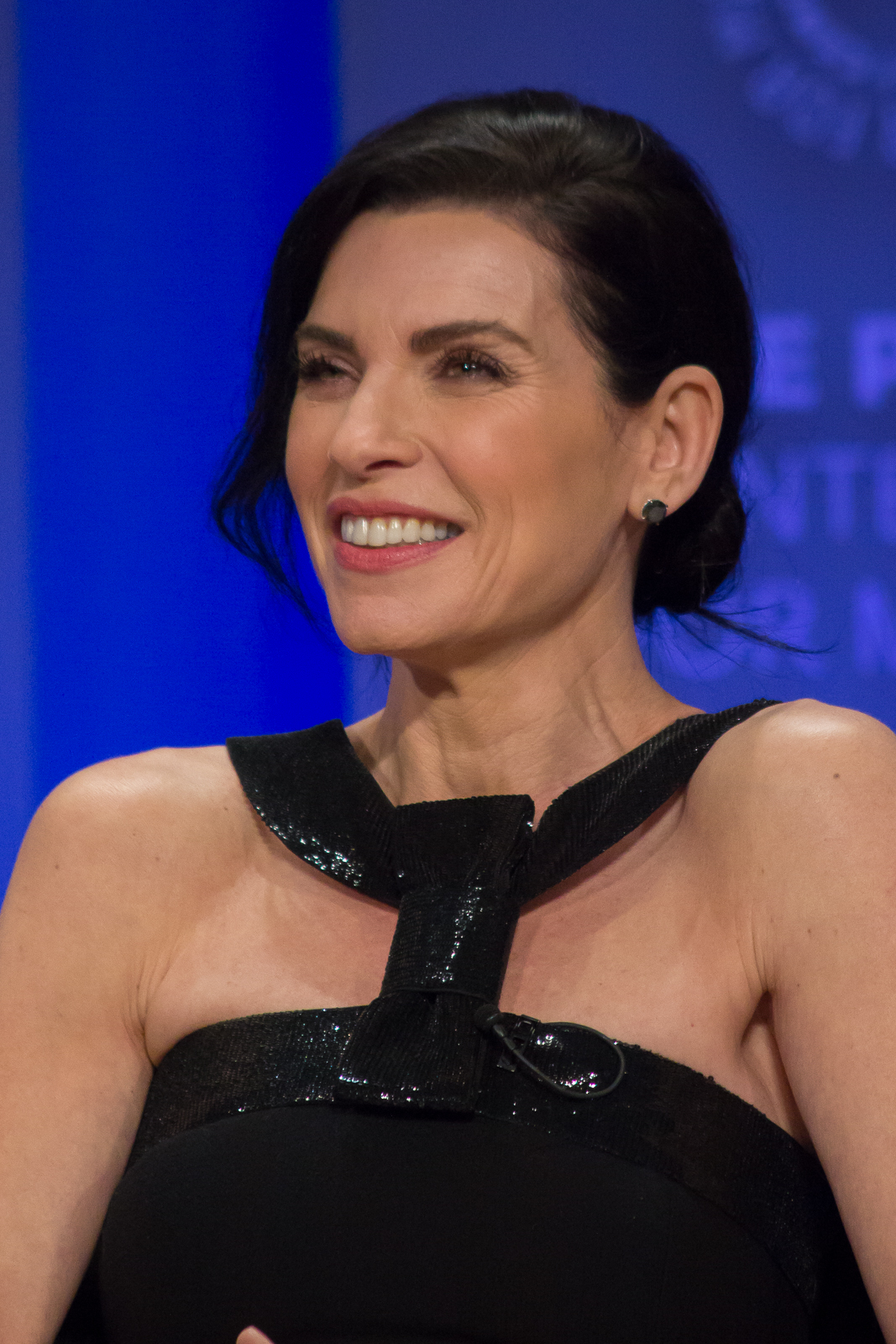
Julianna Margulies, Best Actress in a Drama Series winner

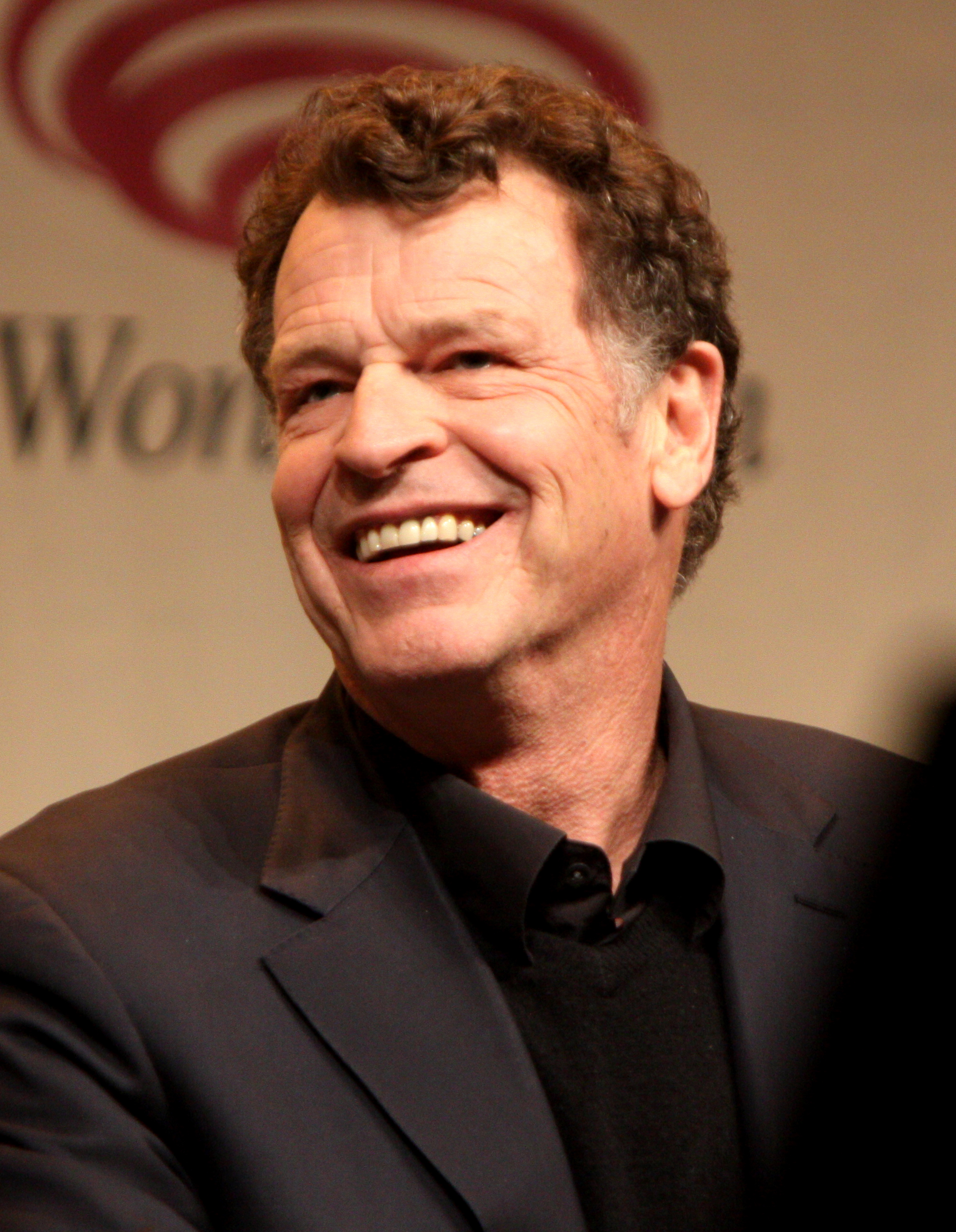
John Noble, Best Supporting Actor in a Drama Series winner

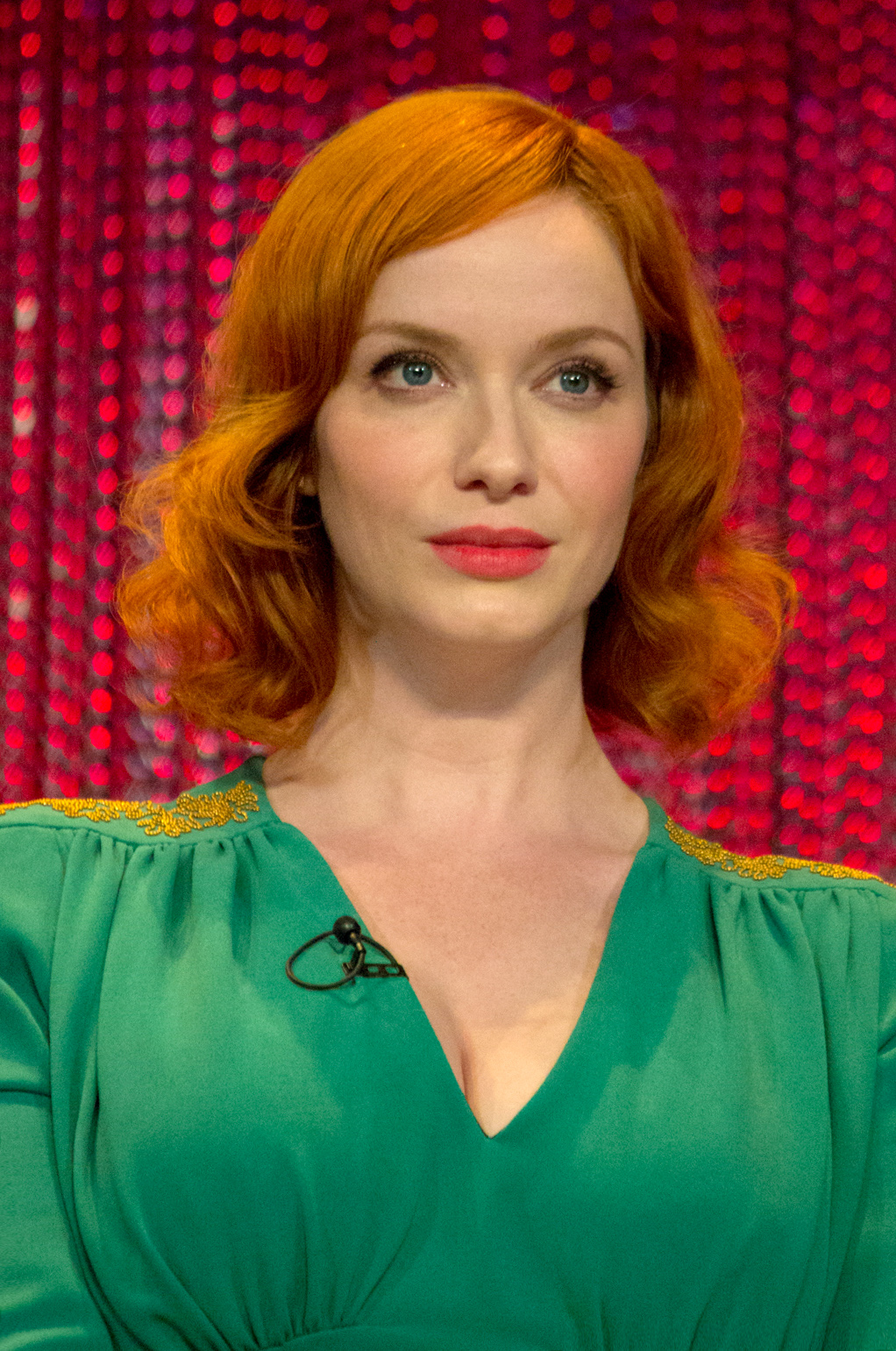
Christina Hendricks, Best Supporting Actress in a Drama Series co-winner

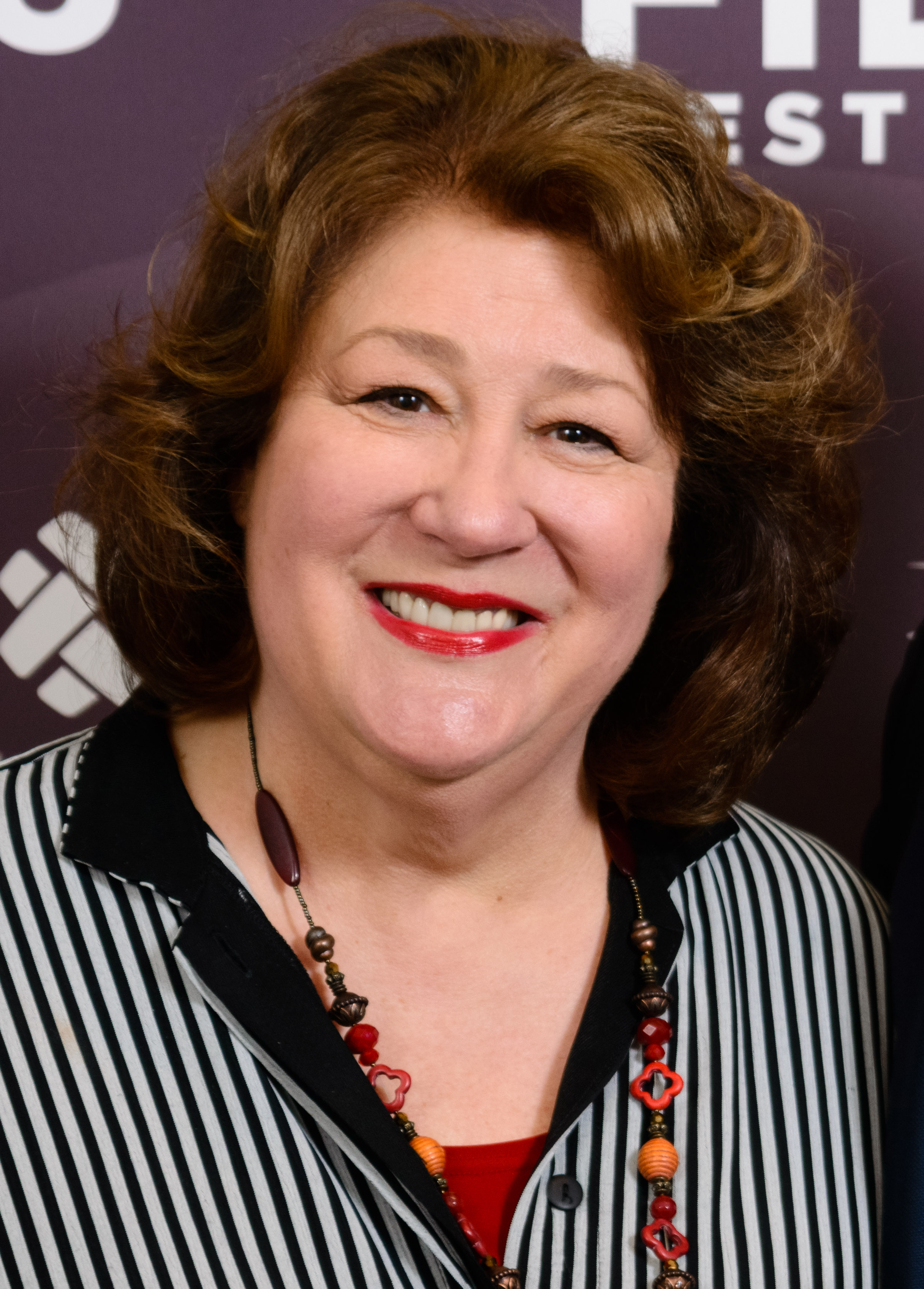
Margo Martindale, Best Supporting Actress in a Drama Series co-winner

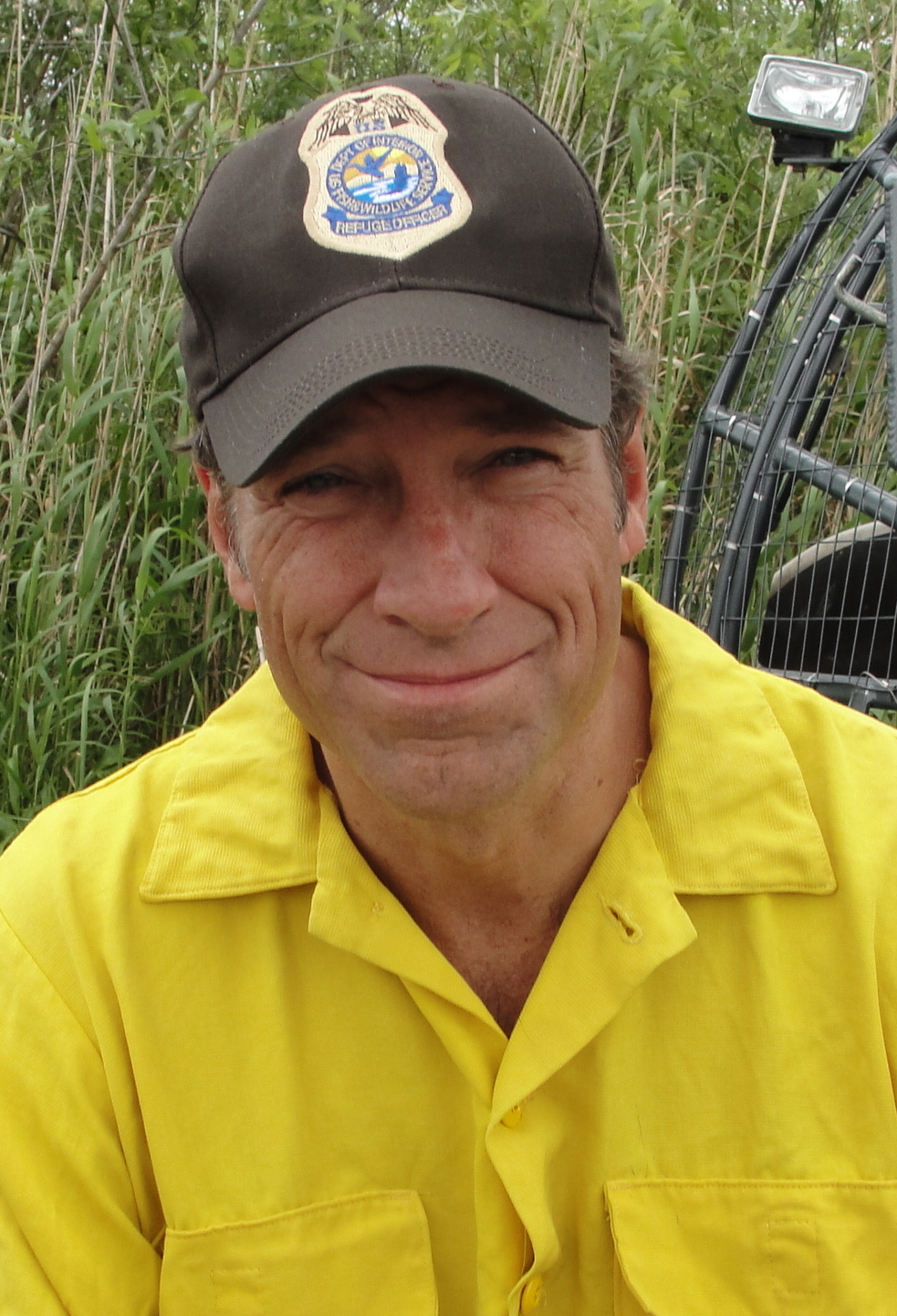
Mike Rowe, Best Reality Show Host winner

Best Series
Best Comedy Series	Best Drama Series
**Modern Family (ABC)**: 30 Rock (NBC); Archer (FX); The Big Bang Theory (CBS); Community (NBC); Glee (Fox); Louie (FX); The Middle (ABC); The Office (NBC); Parks and Recreation (NBC)	**Mad Men (AMC)**: Boardwalk Empire (HBO); Dexter (Showtime); Friday Night Lights (NBC / Audience Network); Fringe (Fox); Game of Thrones (HBO); The Good Wife (CBS); Justified (FX); The Killing (AMC); The Walking Dead (AMC)
Most Exciting New Series (All Honored)
Alcatraz (Fox); Awake (NBC); Don't Trust the B— in Apartment 23 (ABC); Falling Skies (TNT); New Girl (Fox); Ringer (The CW); Smash (NBC); Terra Nova (Fox)
Best Acting in a Comedy Series
Best Actor	Best Actress
**Jim Parsons as Dr. Sheldon Cooper – The Big Bang Theory**: Alec Baldwin as Jack Donaghy – 30 Rock; Steve Carell as Michael Scott – The Office; Louis C.K. as Louie – Louie; Charlie Day as Charlie Kelly – It's Always Sunny in Philadelphia; Joel McHale as Jeff Winger – Community	**Tina Fey as Liz Lemon – 30 Rock**: Courteney Cox as Jules Cobb – Cougar Town; Edie Falco as Jackie Peyton, RN – Nurse Jackie; Patricia Heaton as Frankie Heck – The Middle; Martha Plimpton as Virginia Chance – Raising Hope; Amy Poehler as Leslie Knope – Parks and Recreation
Best Supporting Actor	Best Supporting Actress
**Neil Patrick Harris as Barney Stinson – How I Met Your Mother**: Ty Burrell as Phil Dunphy – Modern Family; Nick Offerman as Ron Swanson – Parks and Recreation; Ed O'Neill as Jay Pritchett – Modern Family; Danny Pudi as Abed Nadir – Community; Eric Stonestreet as Cameron Tucker – Modern Family	**Busy Philipps as Laurie Keller – Cougar Town**: Julie Bowen as Claire Dunphy – Modern Family; Jane Krakowski as Jenna Maroney – 30 Rock; Jane Lynch as Sue Sylvester – Glee; Eden Sher as Sue Heck – The Middle; Sofía Vergara as Gloria Delgado-Pritchett – Modern Family
Best Acting in a Drama Series
Best Actor	Best Actress
**Jon Hamm as Don Draper – Mad Men**: Steve Buscemi as Nucky Thompson – Boardwalk Empire; Kyle Chandler as Eric Taylor – Friday Night Lights; Michael C. Hall as Dexter Morgan – Dexter; William H. Macy as Frank Gallagher – Shameless; Timothy Olyphant as Raylan Givens – Justified	**Julianna Margulies as Alicia Florrick – The Good Wife**: Connie Britton as Tami Taylor – Friday Night Lights; Mireille Enos as Det. Sarah Linden – The Killing; Elisabeth Moss as Peggy Olson – Mad Men; Katey Sagal as Gemma Teller Morrow – Sons of Anarchy; Anna Torv as Olivia Dunham – Fringe
Best Supporting Actor	Best Supporting Actress
**John Noble as Dr. Walter Bishop – Fringe**: Alan Cumming as Eli Gold – The Good Wife; Walton Goggins as Boyd Crowder – Justified; Shawn Hatosy as Det. Sammy Bryant – Southland; Michael Pitt as Jimmy Darmody – Boardwalk Empire; John Slattery as Roger Sterling, Jr. – Mad Men	**Christina Hendricks as Joan Harris – Mad Men (TIE)**; **Margo Martindale as Mags Bennett – Justified (TIE)**: Michelle Forbes as Mitch Larsen – The Killing; Kelly Macdonald as Margaret Schroeder – Boardwalk Empire; Archie Panjabi as Kalinda Sharma – The Good Wife; Chloë Sevigny as Nicolette Grant – Big Love
Reality/Variety
Best Reality Series	Best Reality Series – Competition
**Hoarders (A&E) (TIE)**; **The Real Housewives of Beverly Hills (Bravo) (TIE)**: Extreme Makeover: Home Edition (ABC); Sister Wives (TLC); Undercover Boss (CBS)	**American Idol (Fox)**: The Amazing Race (CBS); Dancing with the Stars (ABC); Project Runway (Lifetime); RuPaul's Drag Race (Logo); Top Chef (Bravo)
Best Talk Show	Best Reality Show Host
**The Daily Show with Jon Stewart (Comedy Central)**: Chelsea Lately (E!); The Ellen DeGeneres Show (NBC); Jimmy Kimmel Live! (ABC); Real Time with Bill Maher (HBO)	**Mike Rowe – Dirty Jobs**: Tom Bergeron – Dancing with the Stars; Cat Deeley – So You Think You Can Dance; Ty Pennington – Extreme Makeover: Home Edition; Ryan Seacrest – American Idol

== Shows with multiple wins ==
The following shows received multiple awards:

Series	Network	Category	Wins
Mad Men	AMC	Drama	3

== Shows with multiple nominations ==
The following shows received multiple nominations:

Series	Network	Category	Nominations
Modern Family	ABC	Comedy	6
Mad Men	AMC	Drama	5
Boardwalk Empire	HBO	Drama	4
The Good Wife	CBS	Drama	4
Justified	FX	Drama	4
30 Rock	NBC	Comedy	4
Community	NBC	Comedy	3
Friday Night Lights	NBC/Audience	Drama	3
Fringe	Fox	Drama	3
The Killing	AMC	Drama	3
The Middle	ABC	Comedy	3
Parks and Recreation	NBC	Comedy	3
American Idol	Fox	Reality – Competition	2
The Big Bang Theory	CBS	Comedy	2
Cougar Town	ABC	Comedy	2
Dancing with the Stars	ABC	Reality – Competition	2
Dexter	Showtime	Drama	2
Extreme Makeover: Home Edition	ABC	Reality	2
Glee	Fox	Comedy	2
Louie	FX	Comedy	2
The Office	NBC	Comedy	2
