= Critics' Choice Television Award for Best Comedy Series =

Television award

- Country: United States
- Presented by: Critics Choice Association
- First award: 2011
- Currently held by: Hacks (2025)
- Website: criticschoice.com

The Critics' Choice Television Award for Best Comedy Series is one of the award categories presented annually by the Critics' Choice Television Awards (BTJA).

== History ==
It was introduced in 2011 when the event was first initiated. The winners are selected by a group of television critics that are part of the Broadcast Television Critics Association.

== Winners and nominees ==
indicates the winner

=== 2010s ===
| Year | Title | Network |
|---|---|---|
| 2011 | Modern Family | ABC |
| 2011 | Archer | FX |
| 2011 | The Big Bang Theory | CBS |
| 2011 | Community | NBC |
| 2011 | Glee | Fox |
| 2011 | Louie | FX |
| 2011 | The Middle | ABC |
| 2011 | The Office | NBC |
| 2011 | Parks and Recreation | NBC |
| 2011 | 30 Rock | NBC |
| 2012 | Community | NBC |
| 2012 | The Big Bang Theory | CBS |
| 2012 | Girls | HBO |
| 2012 | Modern Family | ABC |
| 2012 | New Girl | Fox |
| 2012 | Parks and Recreation | NBC |
| 2013 | The Big Bang Theory | CBS |
| 2013 | Louie | FX |
| 2013 | The Middle | ABC |
| 2013 | New Girl | Fox |
| 2013 | Parks and Recreation | NBC |
| 2013 | Veep | HBO |
| 2014 | Orange Is the New Black | Netflix |
| 2014 | The Big Bang Theory | CBS |
| 2014 | Broad City | Comedy Central |
| 2014 | Louie | FX |
| 2014 | Silicon Valley | HBO |
| 2014 | Veep | HBO |
| 2015 | Silicon Valley | HBO |
| 2015 | Broad City | Comedy Central |
| 2015 | Jane the Virgin | The CW |
| 2015 | Mom | CBS |
| 2015 | Transparent | Amazon Prime Video |
| 2015 | Veep | HBO |
| 2015 | You're the Worst | FX |
| 2016 (1) | Master of None | Netflix |
| 2016 (1) | Black-ish | ABC |
| 2016 (1) | Catastrophe | Amazon Prime Video |
| 2016 (1) | Jane the Virgin | The CW |
| 2016 (1) | The Last Man on Earth | Fox |
| 2016 (1) | Transparent | Amazon Prime Video |
| 2016 (1) | You're the Worst | FXX |
| 2016 (2) | Silicon Valley | HBO |
| 2016 (2) | Atlanta | FX |
| 2016 (2) | Black-ish | ABC |
| 2016 (2) | Fleabag | Amazon Prime Video |
| 2016 (2) | Modern Family | ABC |
| 2016 (2) | Unbreakable Kimmy Schmidt | Netflix |
| 2016 (2) | Veep | HBO |
| 2018 | The Marvelous Mrs. Maisel | Amazon Prime Video |
| 2018 | The Big Bang Theory | CBS |
| 2018 | Black-ish | ABC |
| 2018 | GLOW | Netflix |
| 2018 | Modern Family | ABC |
| 2018 | Patriot | Amazon Prime Video |
| 2019 | The Marvelous Mrs. Maisel | Amazon Prime Video |
| 2019 | Atlanta | FX |
| 2019 | Barry | HBO |
| 2019 | The Good Place | NBC |
| 2019 | The Kominsky Method | Netflix |
| 2019 | The Middle | ABC |
| 2019 | One Day at a Time | Netflix |
| 2019 | Schitt's Creek | Pop TV |

=== 2020s ===
| Year | Title | Network |
|---|---|---|
| 2020 | Fleabag | Amazon Prime Video |
| 2020 | Barry | HBO |
| 2020 | The Marvelous Mrs. Maisel | Amazon Prime Video |
| 2020 | Mom | CBS |
| 2020 | One Day at a Time | Netflix |
| 2020 | PEN15 | Hulu |
| 2020 | Schitt's Creek | Pop TV |
| 2021 | Ted Lasso | Apple TV+ |
| 2021 | Better Things | FX |
| 2021 | The Flight Attendant | HBO Max |
| 2021 | Mom | CBS |
| 2021 | PEN15 | Hulu |
| 2021 | Ramy | Hulu |
| 2021 | Schitt's Creek | Pop TV |
| 2021 | What We Do in the Shadows | FX |
| 2022 | Ted Lasso | Apple TV+ |
| 2022 | The Great | Hulu |
| 2022 | Hacks | HBO Max |
| 2022 | Insecure | HBO |
| 2022 | Only Murders in the Building | Hulu |
| 2022 | The Other Two | HBO Max |
| 2022 | Reservation Dogs | FX |
| 2022 | What We Do in the Shadows | FX |
| 2023 | Abbott Elementary | ABC |
| 2023 | Barry | HBO |
| 2023 | The Bear | FX |
| 2023 | Better Things | FX |
| 2023 | Hacks | HBO Max |
| 2023 | Ghosts | CBS |
| 2023 | Reboot | Hulu |
| 2023 | Reservation Dogs | FX |
| 2024 | The Bear | FX |
| 2024 | Abbott Elementary | ABC |
| 2024 | Barry | HBO |
| 2024 | The Marvelous Mrs. Maisel | Amazon Prime Video |
| 2024 | Poker Face | Peacock |
| 2024 | Reservation Dogs | FX |
| 2024 | Shrinking | Apple TV+ |
| 2024 | What We Do in the Shadows | FX |
| 2025 | Hacks | HBO / Max |
| 2025 | Abbott Elementary | ABC |
| 2025 | English Teacher | FX |
| 2025 | Nobody Wants This | Netflix |
| 2025 | Only Murders in the Building | Hulu |
| 2025 | Somebody Somewhere | HBO / Max |
| 2025 | St. Denis Medical | NBC |
| 2025 | What We Do in the Shadows | FX |
| 2026 | The Studio | Apple TV+ |
| 2026 | Abbott Elementary | ABC |
| 2026 | Elsbeth | CBS |
| 2026 | Ghosts | CBS |
| 2026 | Hacks | HBO Max |
| 2026 | Nobody Wants This | Netflix |
| 2026 | Only Murders in the Building | Hulu |
| 2026 | The Righteous Gemstones | HBO |

== Total wins by network ==
- Amazon Prime Video – 3
- HBO / Max – 3
- ABC – 2
- Apple TV+ – 2
- Netflix – 2
- CBS – 1
- FX – 1
- NBC – 1

== Total nominations by network ==
- HBO / Max – 21
- FX – 19
- ABC – 14
- CBS – 11
- Amazon Prime Video – 10
- NBC – 9
- Netflix – 9
- Hulu – 8
- Apple TV+ – 4
- Fox – 4
- Comedy Central – 2
- The CW – 2
- Pop TV – 2
- FXX – 1
- Peacock – 1

== Multiple wins ==
2 wins

- The Marvelous Mrs. Maisel (consecutive)
- Silicon Valley
- Ted Lasso (consecutive)

== Multiple nominations ==
5 nominations

- The Big Bang Theory

4 nominations

- Abbott Elementary
- Barry
- Hacks
- The Marvelous Mrs. Maisel
- Modern Family
- Veep
- What We Do in the Shadows

3 nominations

- Black-ish
- Louie
- The Middle
- Mom
- Only Murders in the Building
- Parks and Recreation
- Reservation Dogs
- Schitt's Creek
- Silicon Valley

2 nominations

- Atlanta
- The Bear
- Better Things
- Broad City
- Community
- Fleabag
- Ghosts
- Jane the Virgin
- New Girl
- Nobody Wants This
- One Day at a Time
- PEN15
- Ted Lasso
- Transparent
- You're the Worst

== See also ==
- TCA Award for Outstanding Achievement in Comedy
- Primetime Emmy Award for Outstanding Comedy Series
- Golden Globe Award for Best Television Series – Musical or Comedy
- Screen Actors Guild Award for Outstanding Performance by an Ensemble in a Comedy Series
