= Critics' Choice Television Award for Best Drama Series =

Television award

- Country: United States
- Presented by: Critics Choice Association
- First award: 2011
- Currently held by: Shōgun (2025)
- Website: criticschoice.com

The Critics' Choice Television Award for Best Drama Series is one of the award categories presented annually by the Critics' Choice Television Awards (BTJA).

== History ==
The award was introduced in 2011 when the event was first initiated. The winners are selected by a group of television critics who are part of the Broadcast Television Critics Association.

== Winners and nominees ==
indicates the winner

=== 2010s ===
Year	Title	Network
2011	Mad Men	AMC
2011	Boardwalk Empire	HBO
2011	Dexter	Showtime
2011	Friday Night Lights	DirecTV; NBC
2011	Fringe	Fox
2011	Game of Thrones	HBO
2011	The Good Wife	CBS
2011	Justified	FX
2011	The Killing	AMC
2011	The Walking Dead	AMC
2012	Homeland	Showtime
2012	Breaking Bad	AMC
2012	Downton Abbey	PBS
2012	Game of Thrones	HBO
2012	The Good Wife	CBS
2012	Mad Men	AMC
2013	Breaking Bad	AMC
2013	Game of Thrones	HBO
2013	The Americans	FX
2013	Downton Abbey	PBS
2013	The Good Wife	CBS
2013	Homeland	Showtime
2014	Breaking Bad	AMC
2014	The Americans	FX
2014	Game of Thrones	HBO
2014	The Good Wife	CBS
2014	Masters of Sex	Showtime
2014	True Detective	HBO
2015	The Americans	FX
2015	Empire	Fox
2015	Game of Thrones	HBO
2015	The Good Wife	CBS
2015	Homeland	Showtime
2015	Justified	FX
2015	Orange Is the New Black	Netflix
2016 (1)	Mr. Robot	USA
2016 (1)	Empire	Fox
2016 (1)	The Knick	Cinemax
2016 (1)	The Leftovers	HBO
2016 (1)	Penny Dreadful	Showtime
2016 (1)	Rectify	Sundance TV
2016 (1)	UnREAL	Lifetime
2016 (2)	Game of Thrones	HBO
2016 (2)	Better Call Saul	AMC
2016 (2)	The Crown	Netflix
2016 (2)	Mr. Robot	USA
2016 (2)	Stranger Things	Netflix
2016 (2)	This Is Us	NBC
2016 (2)	Westworld	HBO
2018	The Handmaid's Tale	Hulu
2018	American Gods	Starz
2018	The Crown	Netflix
2018	Game of Thrones	HBO
2018	Stranger Things	Netflix
2018	This Is Us	NBC
2019	The Americans	FX
2019	Better Call Saul	AMC
2019	The Good Fight	CBS All Access
2019	Homecoming	Prime Video
2019	Killing Eve	BBC America
2019	My Brilliant Friend	HBO
2019	Pose	FX
2019	Succession	HBO

=== 2020s ===
Year	Title	Network
2020	Succession	HBO
2020	The Crown	Netflix
2020	David Makes Man	OWN
2020	Game of Thrones	HBO
2020	The Good Fight	CBS All Access
2020	Pose	FX
2020	This Is Us	NBC
2020	Watchmen	HBO
2021	The Crown	Netflix
2021	Better Call Saul	AMC
2021	The Good Fight	CBS All Access
2021	Lovecraft Country	HBO
2021	The Mandalorian	Disney+
2021	Ozark	Netflix
2021	Perry Mason	HBO
2021	This Is Us	NBC
2022	Succession	HBO
2022	Evil	Paramount+
2022	For All Mankind	Apple TV+
2022	The Good Fight	Paramount+
2022	Pose	FX
2022	Squid Game	Netflix
2022	This Is Us	NBC
2022	Yellowjackets	Showtime
2023	Better Call Saul	AMC
2023	Andor	Disney+
2023	Bad Sisters	Apple TV+
2023	The Crown	Netflix
2023	Euphoria	HBO
2023	The Good Fight	Paramount+
2023	House of the Dragon	HBO
2023	Severance	Apple TV+
2023	Yellowstone	Paramount Network
2024	Succession	HBO
2024	The Crown	Netflix
2024	The Diplomat	Netflix
2024	The Last of Us	HBO / Max
2024	Loki	Disney+
2024	The Morning Show	Apple TV+
2024	Star Trek: Strange New Worlds	Paramount+
2024	Winning Time: The Rise of the Lakers Dynasty	HBO / Max
2025	Shōgun	FX / Hulu
2025	The Day of the Jackal	Peacock
2025	The Diplomat	Netflix
2025	Evil	Paramount+
2025	Industry	HBO / Max
2025	Interview with the Vampire	AMC
2025	The Old Man	FX
2025	Slow Horses	Apple TV+
2026	The Pitt	HBO Max
2026	Alien: Earth	FX
2026	Andor	Disney+
2026	The Diplomat	Netflix
2026	Paradise	Hulu
2026	Pluribus	Apple TV
2026	Severance	Apple TV
2026	Task	HBO Max

== Total wins by network ==
- HBO / Max – 5
- AMC – 4
- FX – 3
- Hulu – 2
- Netflix – 1
- Showtime – 1
- USA – 1

== Total nominations by network ==
- HBO / Max – 27
- Netflix – 14
- AMC – 12
- FX – 12
- Apple TV+ – 7
- Showtime – 7
- NBC – 6
- CBS – 5
- Paramount+ – 5
- Disney+ – 4
- CBS All Access – 3
- Fox – 3
- Hulu – 3
- PBS – 2
- Amazon Prime Video – 1
- BBC America – 1
- Cinemax – 1
- DirecTV – 1
- Lifetime – 1
- OWN – 1
- Paramount Network – 1
- Peacock – 1
- Starz – 1
- Sundance TV – 1

== Multiple wins ==
3 wins

- Succession

2 wins

- The Americans
- Breaking Bad (consecutive)
- Game of Thrones

== Multiple nominations ==
8 nominations

- Game of Thrones

6 nominations

- The Crown

5 nominations

- The Good Fight
- The Good Wife
- This Is Us

4 nominations

- The Americans
- Better Call Saul
- Succession

3 nominations

- Breaking Bad
- The Diplomat
- Homeland
- Pose

2 nominations

- Andor
- Downton Abbey
- Empire
- Evil
- Justified
- Mad Men
- Mr. Robot
- Severance
- Stranger Things

== See also ==
- TCA Award for Outstanding Achievement in Drama
- Primetime Emmy Award for Outstanding Drama Series
- Golden Globe Award for Best Television Series – Drama
- Screen Actors Guild Award for Outstanding Performance by an Ensemble in a Drama Series
