= Tom Bergeron =

American television personality (born 1955)

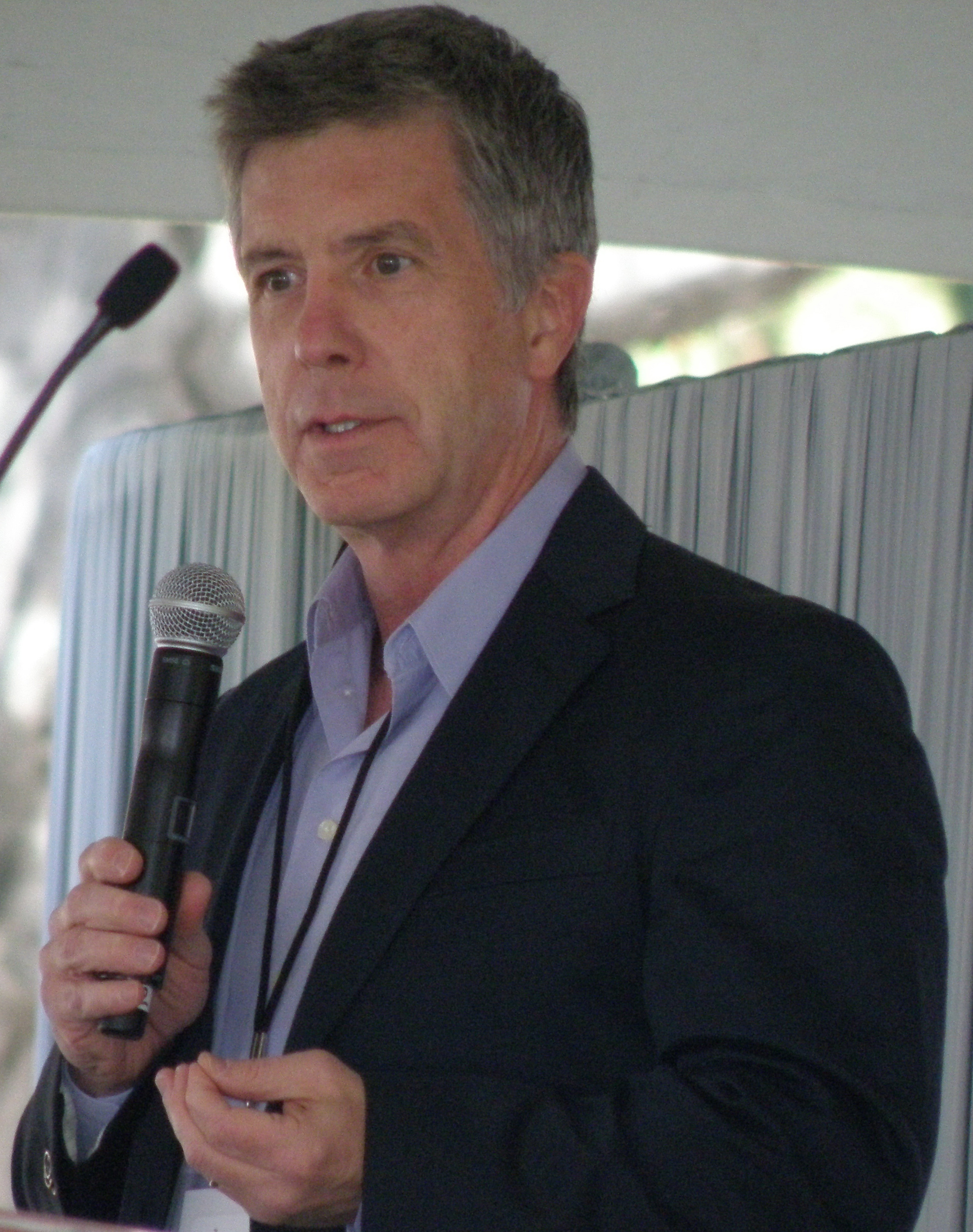
- Bergeron in 2009
- Born: Thomas Raymond Bergeron; May 6, 1955 (age 71); Haverhill, Massachusetts, U.S.
- Occupations: Television personality; game show host; comedian
- Years active: 1980–2026
- Employer: ABC (1997–2019, 2025)
- Known for: Breakfast Time (1994–1997); Good Morning America (1997–1998); Hollywood Squares (1998–2004, 2026); America's Funniest Home Videos (2001–2015, 2016, 2019); Dancing with the Stars (2005–2019, 2025); 60th Primetime Emmy Awards (2008)
- Spouse: Lois Bergeron (m. 1982)
- Children: 2

Thomas Raymond Bergeron (born May 6, 1955) is an American retired television personality, comedian, and game show host. He hosted Breakfast Time from 1994 to 1997, Hollywood Squares from 1998 to 2004, America's Funniest Home Videos from 2001 to 2015, and Dancing with the Stars from 2005 to 2019 and was an anchor on Good Morning America from 1997 to 1998 and a co-host on the 60th Primetime Emmy Awards in 2008.

== Early life ==
Bergeron was born in Haverhill, Massachusetts, the son of Adrian Raymond "Ray" Bergeron Jr. (1934–2015) and Mary Catherine "Kay" Costello (1933–2016). Bergeron is of French Canadian and Irish descent. While being interviewed on The Howard Stern Show, Bergeron revealed when he was 17 years old he interviewed Larry Fine and Moe Howard of The Three Stooges after contacting the nursing home where Fine was residing.

== Career ==
His first job in broadcasting was as a disc jockey at local radio station WHAV, in his home town of Haverhill, Massachusetts. He became a radio DJ in the Seacoast area of New Hampshire in the early 1980s on Portsmouth's WHEB, where he played comedy records along with music and offbeat interviews. This led to additional television and radio auditions.

One of his first jobs on television was as host of a local game show, Granite State Challenge, on New Hampshire Public Television (produced at NHPTV flagship station WENH-TV). He moved to the Boston market in February 1982, joining WBZ-TV as a general on-air personality. His early roles at the station included being a contributor on Evening Magazine (1982–1987), and hosting brief informational and show preview segments known as 4 Today, every 30 minutes during WBZ's daytime lineup (1983–1987). In 1984, he landed the hosting spot on Lottery Live, the nightly drawings of the Massachusetts State Lottery games. In January 1987, while still working in these roles, Bergeron began hosting People Are Talking, replacing Buzz Luttrell on the early afternoon talk show. While he was replaced by Ron Cantera as host of 4 Today until its cancellation in 1988, Bergeron remained lottery host until drawings moved to WNEV-TV in August 1987. Bergeron additionally served as the original host of WBZ's weekend morning teenage discussion series Rap-Around from 1987 to 1989.

By the early 1990s, WBZ was featuring him on WBZ Radio. It was there he had an early-morning radio show called The Tom Bergeron Show. When People Are Talking ended a 13-year run in June 1993, Bergeron remained on WBZ-TV as commentator and lifestyle reporter for the station's expanded hour-long noon newscast. In early 1994, Bergeron briefly surfaced as a morning host on Boston's soft-rock station WMJX ("Magic 106.7"), which was only a short commute to WBZ's studios for his work on the noon news.

Bergeron credits a portion of his success as a television personality to his more than 35 years of regularly practicing Transcendental Meditation. He discussed his meditation practice on 10 Percent Happier with Dan Harris and The Fifth Dimension: A Mindfulness Podcast.

=== National television work ===
From 1994 to 1997, Bergeron co-hosted the morning show Breakfast Time on FX and later retitled Fox After Breakfast when the show moved to Fox.

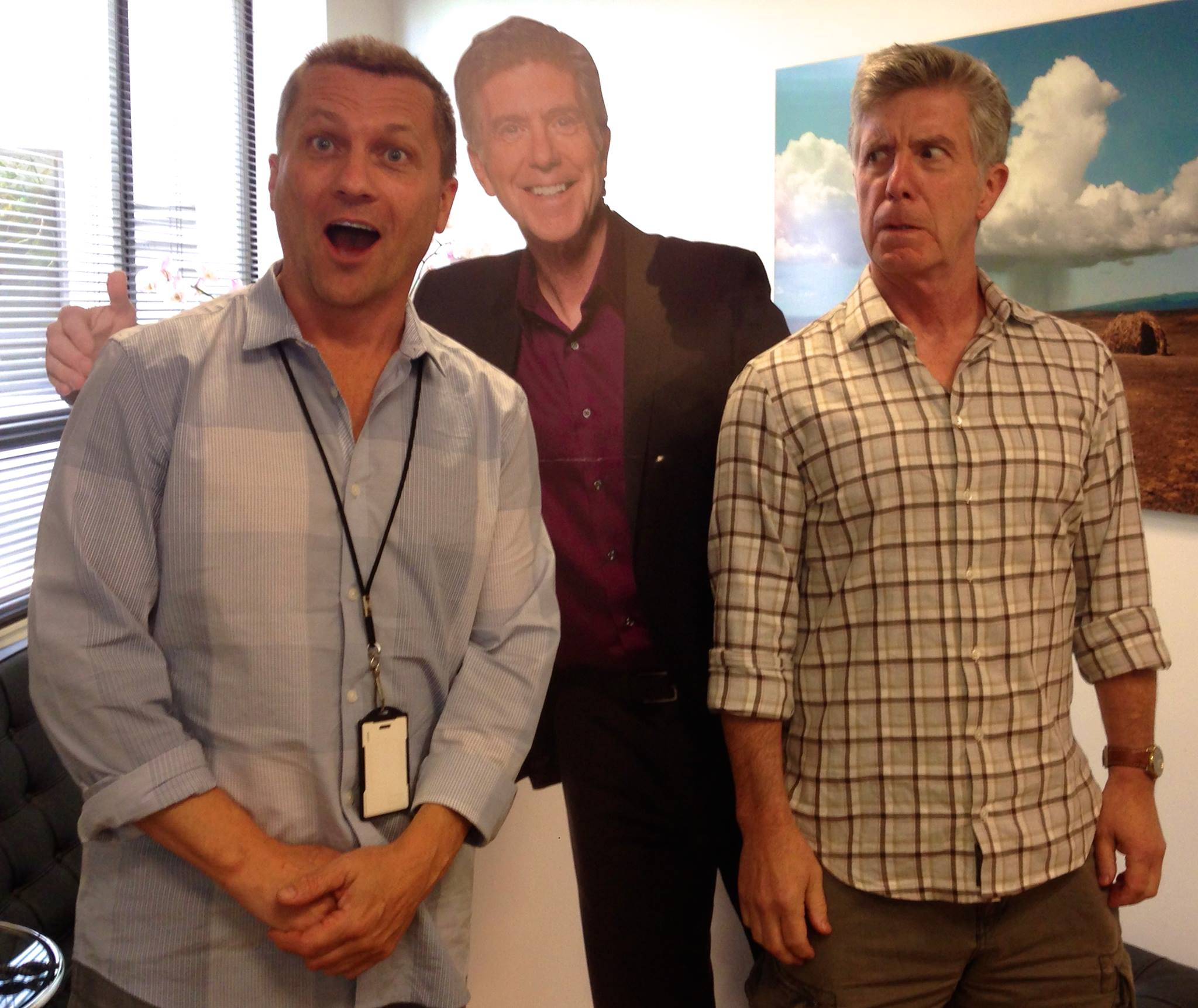
Bergeron with Todd Thicke at AFV Headquarters

In 1997, Bergeron joined ABC, where he served as a guest host for Good Morning America.

Bergeron was the host of Hollywood Squares from 1998 to 2004, a role for which he won a Daytime Emmy Award for Outstanding Game Show Host in 2000.

In February 2001, he became the host of the ABC series America's Funniest Home Videos. In March 2014, Bergeron announced on Twitter that he would be leaving America's Funniest Home Videos after season 25. Bergeron's final episode of America's Funniest Home Videos aired on May 17, 2015; he was replaced by Alfonso Ribeiro. As of 2025, Bergeron remains the show's longest tenured host.

In June 2005, he began hosting the reality series Dancing with the Stars, also on ABC. For his work on Dancing with the Stars, he received nine Primetime Emmy Award nominations for Outstanding Host for a Reality or Competition Program, winning the award once in 2012. On July 13, 2020, Bergeron announced he had been dismissed from the series after 28 seasons. On November 11, 2025, Bergeron returned to Dancing with the Stars as guest judge on during week nine of season 34 celebrating the 20th anniversary of the show; he also performed partial hosting duties with current hosts Alfonso Ribeiro and Julianne Hough.

On September 21, 2008, Bergeron co-hosted the 60th Primetime Emmy Awards alongside Heidi Klum, Jeff Probst, Ryan Seacrest, and Howie Mandel. The five were selected to host in recognition of their nominations in the inaugural category of Outstanding Host for a Reality or Competition Program.

In 2020, Bergeron competed in the third season of The Masked Singer as "Taco".

In 2026, Bergeron appeared as a panelist in season 2 on the CBS primetime version of Hollywood Squares hosted by Nate Burleson. The episode he appeared in was called "The Legacy Show" airing on January 28, 2026.

== Personal life ==
Bergeron has been married to Lois since 1982 and has two daughters.

In 2009, Bergeron published his autobiography I'm Hosting as Fast as I Can!: Zen and the Art of Staying Sane in Hollywood.

== Filmography ==
=== Film ===
Year	Title	Role	Notes
2009	Rock Slyde	Randy Wonder	
2018	Candy Jar	Principal Nelson	

=== Television ===
Year	Title	Role	Notes
1987–1990	People Are Talking	Himself/host	
1994–1997	Breakfast Time	Himself/host	
1996	The Daily Show	Himself	2 episodes
1997–1998	Good Morning America	Himself/anchor	
1998	The Nanny	Himself	Episode: "Making Whoopi"
1998–2004, 2026	Hollywood Squares	Himself/host	1,047 episodes (includes being panelist on January 28, 2026)
2001–2015, 2016, 2019	America's Funniest Home Videos	Himself/host	335 episodes Also producer (seasons 17-25) and guest (Season 26 grand prize show and "This is You!" documentary)
2002–2005	Star Trek: Enterprise	Coridan Ambassador, Alien Trader D'Marr	2 episodes
2005–2019, 2025	Dancing with the Stars	Himself/Host	444 episodes (includes being guest host and judge for the 20th birthday party on November 11, 2025)
2005–present	Entertainment Tonight	Himself	20 episodes
2006–2019	Good Morning America	Himself	21 episodes
2008	Supper Club with Tom Bergeron	Himself	13 episodes
2010	Castle	Bobby Mann	Episode: "The Late Shaft"
2011	Phineas and Ferb	Announcer (voice)	Episode: "Bullseye!"
2012–2014, 2016	A Capitol Fourth	Himself/host	
2013	Sesame Street	Johnny Gotcha	Episode 4412: "Gotcha!"
2015	The Muppets	Himself	Episode: "Pig Girls Don't Cry"
2017	The $100,000 Pyramid	Himself/Panelist	Episode: "Leslie Jones vs. LL Cool J and Tom Bergeron vs. Jennifer Nettles"
2017	To Tell the Truth	Himself/Panelist	2 episodes
2017	The 3rd Annual Carney Awards	Himself/host	Television special
2017	Access Daily	Himself	1 episode
2018	Behind Closed Doors	Himself	Episode: "John Ritter"
2018	Steve	Himself	Episode: "Tom Bergeron/Cali Champion, Dr. V & Alesha Renee"
2018	Animals.	Himself	Episode: "Pigeons"
2018	The Messenger	The Messenger	Also producer
2020	The Masked Singer	Taco/Himself	Eliminated in "Friends in High Places: Group B Championships"
2020	Down the Middle	Rex	6 episodes
2022	American Auto	Himself	Episode: "Charity Dinner"
2025	Dancing with Sharks	Himself	Part of the 2025 Shark Week

== Accolades ==
Award	Year	Category	Work	Result	Ref.
Critics' Choice Awards	2018	Best Reality Show Host	Dancing with the Stars	Nominated	
Critics' Choice Television Awards	2011	Best Reality Show Host	Dancing with the Stars	Nominated	
Critics' Choice Television Awards	2012	Best Reality Show Host	Dancing with the Stars	Won	
Critics' Choice Television Awards	2013	Best Reality Show Host	Dancing with the Stars	Won (Note: Tied with Cat Deeley for So You Think You Can Dance.)	
Critics' Choice Television Awards	2014	Best Reality Show Host	Dancing with the Stars	Nominated	
Critics' Choice Television Awards	2015	Best Reality Show Host	Dancing with the Stars	Nominated	
Critics' Choice Television Awards	2016	Best Reality Show Host	Dancing with the Stars	Nominated	
Critics' Choice Television Awards	2018	Best Reality Show Host	Dancing with the Stars	Nominated	
Daytime Emmy Awards	1999	Outstanding Game Show Host	Hollywood Squares	Nominated	
Daytime Emmy Awards	2000	Outstanding Game Show Host	Hollywood Squares	Won (Note: Tied with Bob Barker for The Price Is Right.)	
Daytime Emmy Awards	2001	Outstanding Game Show Host	Hollywood Squares	Nominated	
Daytime Emmy Awards	2003	Outstanding Game Show Host	Hollywood Squares	Nominated	
Primetime Emmy Awards	2006	Outstanding Reality Competition Program	Dancing with the Stars	Nominated (Note: For seasons 1–2)	
Primetime Emmy Awards	2007	Outstanding Reality Competition Program	Dancing with the Stars	Nominated (Note: For seasons 3–4)	
Primetime Emmy Awards	2008	Outstanding Host for a Reality or Reality Competition Program	Dancing with the Stars	Nominated	
Primetime Emmy Awards	2010	Outstanding Host for a Reality or Reality Competition Program	Dancing with the Stars	Nominated	
Primetime Emmy Awards	2011	Outstanding Host for a Reality or Reality Competition Program	Dancing with the Stars	Nominated	
Primetime Emmy Awards	2012	Outstanding Host for a Reality or Reality Competition Program	Dancing with the Stars	Won	
Primetime Emmy Awards	2013	Outstanding Host for a Reality or Reality Competition Program	Dancing with the Stars	Nominated	
Primetime Emmy Awards	2014	Outstanding Host for a Reality or Reality Competition Program	Dancing with the Stars	Nominated	
Primetime Emmy Awards	2015	Outstanding Host for a Reality or Reality Competition Program	Dancing with the Stars	Nominated	
Primetime Emmy Awards	2016	Outstanding Host for a Reality or Reality Competition Program	Dancing with the Stars	Nominated	

== Notes ==
Media offices
Preceded by John Davidson (1986–1989)	Host of Hollywood Squares; 1998–2004	Succeeded by Nate Burleson (2025)
Preceded by Mike Kasem; Kerri Kasem	Host of America's Funniest Home Videos; 2001–2015	Succeeded by Alfonso Ribeiro
Preceded by Series created	Host of Dancing with the Stars; 2005–2019, 2025 (Guest); With: Lisa Canning (2005); Samantha Harris (2006–2009); Brooke Burke (2010–2013); Erin Andrews (2014–2019)	Succeeded by Tyra Banks
