= Critics' Choice Television Award for Best Reality Show Host =

Annual award by the Broadcast Television Critics Association

The Critics' Choice Television Award for Best Reality Host is one of the award categories presented annually by the Critics' Choice Television Awards (BTJA) to recognize the work done by television hosts.

== Winners and nominees ==
=== 2010s ===
Year	Winner	Show
2010-2011	Mike Rowe	Dirty Jobs
2010-2011	Tom Bergeron	Dancing with the Stars
2010-2011	Cat Deeley	So You Think You Can Dance
2010-2011	Ty Pennington	Extreme Makeover: Home Edition
2010-2011	Ryan Seacrest	American Idol
2011-2012	Tom Bergeron	Dancing with the Stars
2011-2012	Cat Deeley	So You Think You Can Dance
2011-2012	Nick Cannon	America's Got Talent
2011-2012	Phil Keoghan	The Amazing Race
2011-2012	RuPaul	RuPaul's Drag Race
2012-2013	Tom Bergeron	Dancing with the Stars
2012-2013	Cat Deeley	So You Think You Can Dance
2012-2013	Gordon Ramsay	Hell's Kitchen / MasterChef
2012-2013	RuPaul	RuPaul's Drag Race
2012-2013	Ryan Seacrest	American Idol
2012-2013	Kurt Warner	The Moment
2013-2014	Neil deGrasse Tyson	Cosmos: A Spacetime Odyssey
2013-2014	Tom Bergeron	Dancing with the Stars
2013-2014	Carson Daly	The Voice
2013-2014	Cat Deeley	So You Think You Can Dance
2013-2014	Gordon Ramsay	MasterChef
2013-2014	RuPaul	RuPaul's Drag Race
2014-2015	Cat Deeley	So You Think You Can Dance
2014-2015	Tom Bergeron	Dancing with the Stars
2014-2015	Anthony Bourdain	Anthony Bourdain: Parts Unknown
2014-2015	Phil Keoghan	The Amazing Race
2014-2015	James Lipton	Inside the Actors Studio
2014-2015	Betty White	Betty White's Off Their Rockers
2015 (2)	James Lipton	Inside the Actors Studio
2015 (2)	Ted Allen	Chopped
2015 (2)	Phil Keoghan	The Amazing Race
2015 (2)	Jane Lynch	Hollywood Game Night
2015 (2)	Jeff Probst	Survivor
2015 (2)	Gordon Ramsay	Hell's Kitchen
2016	Anthony Bourdain	Anthony Bourdain: Parts Unknown
2016	Ted Allen	Chopped
2016	Tom Bergeron	Dancing with the Stars
2016	Nick Cannon	America's Got Talent
2016	Carson Daly	The Voice
2016	RuPaul	RuPaul's Drag Race
2017	RuPaul	RuPaul's Drag Race
2017	Ted Allen	Chopped
2017	Tyra Banks	America's Got Talent
2017	Tom Bergeron	Dancing with the Stars
2017	Cat Deeley	So You Think You Can Dance
2017	Joanna and Chip Gaines	Fixer Upper

== Multiple wins ==
2 wins

- Tom Bergeron
- Cat Deeley

== Multiple nominations ==
7 nominations

- Tom Bergeron

6 nominations

- Cat Deeley

5 nominations

- RuPaul

3 nominations

- Ted Allen
- Phil Keoghan
- Gordon Ramsay

2 nominations

- Anthony Bourdain
- Nick Cannon
- Carson Daly
- James Lipton
- Ryan Seacrest

== See also ==
- Primetime Emmy Award for Outstanding Host for a Reality or Reality-Competition Program
