= Anthony Bourdain: Parts Unknown =

American television series

- Logo
- Created by: Zero Point Zero Production Inc.
- Presented by: Anthony Bourdain
- Theme music composer: Josh Homme; Mark Lanegan
- Country of origin: United States
- No. of seasons: 12
- No. of episodes: 104

Production
- Running time: 60 minutes

Original release
- Network: CNN
- Release: April 14, 2013 – November 11, 2018

Anthony Bourdain: Parts Unknown is an American travel and food show on CNN that premiered on April 14, 2013. In the show, Anthony Bourdain travels the world uncovering lesser-known places and exploring their cultures and cuisine. The show won twelve Primetime Emmy Awards out of 31 nominations, as well as a 2013 Peabody Award.

The digital series Explore Parts Unknown, an editorial partnership with Roads & Kingdoms, won a Primetime Emmy Award for Outstanding Short Form Nonfiction or Reality Series. Parts Unknown aired the last collection of episodes on CNN in the autumn of 2018. The series finale, titled "Lower East Side"—bringing Bourdain's culinary travelogue full circle back to Bourdain's hometown of New York—aired November 11, 2018.

Bourdain was working on an episode of the show centered in Strasbourg, France, at the time of his death on June 8, 2018.

== Episodes ==
Season	Episodes	Originally released	
Season	Episodes	First released	Last released
1	8	April 14, 2013	June 9, 2013
2	9	September 15, 2013	November 10, 2013
3	9	April 13, 2014	June 8, 2014
4	9	September 28, 2014	November 16, 2014
5	9	April 26, 2015	June 21, 2015
6	9	September 27, 2015	November 15, 2015
7	8	April 24, 2016	June 5, 2016
8	10	September 24, 2016	December 4, 2016
9	9	April 23, 2017	July 2, 2017
10	8	October 1, 2017	November 26, 2017
11	8	April 29, 2018	June 24, 2018
12	7	September 23, 2018	November 11, 2018

=== Season 1 (2013) ===
No. overall	No. in season	Title	Original release date
1	1	"Myanmar"	April 14, 2013
With the slight relaxation of control by the government of Myanmar (Burma), Tony is finally able to explore one of the most fabled and beautiful areas of Asia.
2	2	"Koreatown, Los Angeles"	April 21, 2013
Tony visits the three square-mile area of Los Angeles known as Koreatown, where he finds a tight-knit community still marked by the 1992 Rodney King riots. Tony travels throughout the community with chef Roy Choi and artist David Choe to see how much the town has evolved and how other cultures have integrated into Koreatown, and to see what it was like to grow up Korean American.
3	3	"Colombia"	April 28, 2013
The public face of Colombia has changed immensely over the past ten years and is still changing for the better. Tony will explore several regions of the country from the mountains down to the Caribbean coast to the coca leaf growing inland formerly controlled by drug cartels.
4	4	"Quebec"	May 5, 2013
Bourdain travels to the province of Quebec where he samples local delicacies in Montreal and Quebec City and explores ice fishing and beaver hunting and spends time with two of the funniest and most brilliant chefs/restaurateurs in Canada, Joe Beef's Dave McMillan and Fred Morin.
5	5	"Morocco (Tangier)"	May 12, 2013
Tony explores the "Interzone", where artists like Burroughs, Bowles and the Rolling Stones sought escape from western moral prohibitions and the possibilities of great empty spaces.
6	6	"Libya"	May 19, 2013
Libyan hip-hop, Italian restaurants, tribal allegiances and post-war uncertainty in Libya. Bourdain looks at the country through personal stories, food—and the music of anti-Gaddafi rapper expats who returned to fight.
7	7	"Peru"	June 2, 2013
Tony and his friend, world-renowned chef Eric Ripert, explore the far reaches of indigenous Andes in search of a rare variety of wild cocoa that is said to be the best in the world. They move from hip, modern Lima back in time into pre-Columbian Peru.
8	8	"Congo"	June 9, 2013
Tony visits the Democratic Republic of the Congo, the setting of one of his favorite books, Joseph Conrad's Heart of Darkness, and the basis for one of his favorite movies, Apocalypse Now. He travels up the Congo River on a boat.

=== Season 2 (2013) ===
No. overall	No. in season	Title	Original release date
9	1	"Prime Cuts: Season One"	September 15, 2013
A retrospective of season one and preview of season two.
10	2	"Jerusalem"	September 15, 2013
The host and crew make their first trip to Israel, the West Bank and Gaza. While the political situation is often tense between the people living in these areas, Bourdain concentrates on their rich history; food and culture; and spends time with local chefs, home cooks, writers and amateur foodies.
11	3	"Spain"	September 22, 2013
Anthony explores Andalucía during Semana Santa (Holy Week, leading up to Easter), a time filled with great pageantry and excitement. Featured in this episode is Bourdain's longtime Director of Photography Zach Zamboni, who lives part-time in Granada and shows the host sights off the beaten path and immerses them in tapas culture.
12	4	"New Mexico"	September 29, 2013
The show takes a close look at the mash-up of cultures that comprise this uniquely American state. Tony and crew sample New Mexico's food — a combination of Spanish, Mediterranean, Mexican, Pueblo, and even chuck-wagon influences. New Mexico is also a land of drugs, guns, monster vehicles, and possibly extraterrestrials. It may also be the perfect place to investigate the underside of the Western cowboy ideal.
13	5	"Copenhagen"	October 6, 2013
This episode explores the food and natural beauty of Copenhagen, the economic and cultural center of Denmark. The episode focuses on chef René Redzepi and his Michelin two star restaurant, Noma. Noma was ranked as "The Best Restaurant in the World" in 2010, 2011, and 2012 by Restaurant magazine.
14	6	"Sicily"	October 13, 2013
Parts Unknown explores the Sicilian way of life, which puts a premium on savoring family, life, and food. Bourdain travels in search of those foods as he eats his way around the island. He makes his home base at the Villa Monaci, on the outskirts of Catania with his enthusiastic, fast-talking sidekicks who counter the otherwise relaxed tempo and epic "food porn" of this episode.
15	7	"South Africa"	October 20, 2013
Once considered the most dangerous city in the world, Johannesburg now barely makes the top 50. But the end of the apartheid has led to vast changes in the city.
16	8	"Tokyo"	November 3, 2013
Bourdain has traveled to Tokyo countless times, but on this trip he is in search of the city's dark, extreme, and bizarrely fetishistic underside. Japan is a paradox. The low birthrate, the dedication, the conformity, and the life of a salary man are well known. There is also a competitive and rigid culture that gives way to some unique subcultures. A significant portion of the episode is spent with sushi chef Yasuda.
17	9	"Detroit"	November 10, 2013
Bourdain steps into the lives of Detroit natives and sees the glory days of the past at the famed Packard Plant, the current state of the city's urban decay, and the promise of the future in the citizens who are rebuilding their communities.

=== Season 3 (2014) ===
No. overall	No. in season	Title	Original release date
18	1	"Prime Cuts: Season Two"	April 13, 2014
A retrospective of season two and preview of season three.
19	2	"Punjab, India"	April 13, 2014
In the season premiere, the host dives into the ever-changing state of Punjab with a trip to Amritsar, sampling cuisine at the dhabas (roadside restaurants), a gurpurb festival (Sikh celebration), Chapslee Estate and a free community vegetarian restaurant, while meeting with local residents who give their perspectives on life in this sometimes contentious region of India, bordering Pakistan.
20	3	"Las Vegas"	April 20, 2014
Bourdain travels to Las Vegas, a city known for over-indulgence, with food author Michael Ruhlman and visits locales that include Huntridge Tavern (in the shadow of the strip), Lotus of Siam with chef Jet Tila and famed restaurant by José Andrés. Tony dines with Penn Jillette to discuss the ever changing entertainment landscape in Las Vegas. Former mayor Oscar Goodman talks about old gangsters and old Vegas. Professional poker players Erick Lindgren and Erica Schoenberg play cards with Tony and Michael.
21	4	"Lyon"	April 27, 2014
In this food-centric episode, Bourdain accompanies world-renowned chef/restaurateur Daniel Boulud as they travel back to Boulud's hometown of Lyon, France for a "once-in-a-lifetime" pilgrimage to the so-called Mecca of French cuisine's rich food culture and legendary chefs, with a focus on Nouvelle cuisine innovator Paul Bocuse.
22	5	"Mexico"	May 4, 2014
Bourdain travels to Mexico City, Oaxaca, and Cuernavaca to commune with local residents who express their passion through food, art, and the struggle for an improved quality of life. Bourdain talks with journalist Anabel Hernández on the impact of the area's drug trade-related violence and how it affects local quality of life.
23	6	"Russia"	May 11, 2014
On the eve of the Olympic games in Sochi, Bourdain takes his first trip in nearly 10 years to Russia, accompanied by his longtime traveling partner Zamir Gotta. Looking through the lens of a now Putin-controlled Russia, Bourdain confers with prominent locals, visits Moscow's historic Metropol Hotel, takes the Grand Express train to St. Petersburg, and explores the drinking and dining scene. One of the "prominent locals" who expresses criticism of Putin on the show is opposition politician Boris Nemtsov, who was assassinated in February 2015.
24	7	"Mississippi Delta"	May 18, 2014
Bourdain goes off the beaten path and explores some of the food and history of Mississippi including downtown Jackson's Big Apple Inn, known for its "Pig Ear Sandwich" and as a center of activity during the Civil Rights Movement, and then travels into the Mississippi Delta to Po' Monkey's, a juke joint located in an old sharecropper structure.
25	8	"Thailand"	June 1, 2014
Bourdain and his crew head to the Chiang Mai Province of Northern Thailand along with celebrated chef and Thai food specialist Andy Ricker (Pok Pok restaurants) to explore the country's distinctive eating and drinking scene that varies by region and season.
26	9	"Bahia, Brazil"	June 8, 2014
Parts Unknown tours Bahia, known as the "African heart of Brazil" and internationally recognized for its Afro-Brazilian music, art, design and food. A look at the dance/martial art of Capoeira, the region's legendary food vendors, Salvadoran fishing neighborhoods, and a BBQ on the beach are featured.

=== Season 4 (2014) ===
Season 4 aired from September to December 2014.

No. overall	No. in season	Title	Original release date
27	1	"Prime Cuts: Season Three"	September 28, 2014
A retrospective of season three and preview of season four.
28	2	"Shanghai"	September 28, 2014
Bourdain visits Shanghai, witnessing firsthand the effects of China's booming economy on the vast nation. He explores aspects of Chinese history and culture that still resonate today, and seeks out the best street food. Bourdain also crashes a wedding.
29	3	"The Bronx"	October 5, 2014
Anthony Bourdain explores the rich cultural diversity and unique variety of cuisines the Bronx has to offer. From the Bronx's role in the birth of hip-hop to traditional Jamaican tonics to deep fried pig parts, Bourdain unearths the energy, vibe and rhythm of this often overlooked borough of New York City.
30	4	"Paraguay"	October 12, 2014
A South American country of 6 million, much of the oppressively hot landlocked nation of Paraguay is jungle terrain or desert known as "the Chaco." It also holds a Bourdain family mystery.
31	5	"Vietnam"	October 19, 2014
Bourdain visits the former Vietnamese Imperial capital of Huế in Central Vietnam, the nation's spiritual, cultural and culinary capital, where he tries local specialties such as Bún bò Huế, Cơm hến (clams with rice topped with clam broth and pork rinds), Bánh bèo and Bánh bột lọc (cassava flour cakes topped with pan-fried shrimp, pork belly & green onions) at street-side vendors and restaurants. He visits Đông Ba Market, a local artist's home sampling Vietnamese imperial court cuisine, a local fishing village, and the communist Vịnh Mốc tunnels north of the former DMZ. Anthony revisits the 1968 Tet Offensive, including the Battle of Huế and the Huế Massacre, where 3000 civilians were massacred by the Viet Cong.
32	6	"Tanzania"	October 26, 2014
Leaving behind the Africa we've come to know in the news — full of corruption, poverty and conflict — Bourdain embraces the wild, untamed continent of mystery, adventure and exoticism during a visit to Tanzania.
33	7	"Iran"	November 2, 2014
Bourdain shines a light on how Iranians are existing within an oppressive government system. He visits Isfahan and Tehran and stops at two private homes for traditional Persian cooking. The episode ends with a nightlife scene in Northern Tehran. This episode features Jason Rezaian and his wife and journalist Yeganeh Salehi before they were taken into custody by Iranian authorities in 2014.
34	8	"Massachusetts"	November 9, 2014
Bourdain visits Provincetown on Cape Cod and reminisces about the time he spent there as a young adult. He then travels to Franklin County in western Massachusetts for an exploration of the heroin epidemic in the area.
35	9	"Jamaica"	November 16, 2014
Bourdain visits the coastal city of Port Antonio and meets with billionaire businessman Michael Lee-Chin and his business partner, Jon Baker, who are attempting to increase tourism to the area. He then visits Goldeneye, James Bond novelist Ian Fleming's estate, and nearby James Bond Beach, and has dinner with Goldeneye's current owner, legendary music producer Chris Blackwell. He also meets with various locals, and enjoys local dishes such as jerk chicken, curry goat and ackee and saltfish, while discussing the tensions between rich and poor, and tourists and locals, on the island. Parts of the episode have a soundtrack reminiscent of James Bond films of the 1960s.

=== Season 5 (2015) ===
Season 5 aired from April to June 2015.

No. overall	No. in season	Title	Original release date
36	1	"Prime Cuts: Season Four"	April 26, 2015
A retrospective of season four and preview of season five.
37	2	"Korea"	April 26, 2015
Reverse chronology is used to tell the story of Tony's return trip to South Korea after a 10-year absence. He experiences the nuances of hyper-modern Seoul which has its sights set on becoming the world's top exporter of popular culture. Food options include Korean fried chicken, and Budae-jjigae, a Korean stew made with Spam, canned baked beans, frankfurters, ramen noodles and kimchi.
38	3	"Miami"	May 3, 2015
Tony visits favorite haunt Club Deuce bar, the B&M market in "Little Haiti" for cow foot soup, Islas Canarias with chef Michelle Bernstein for a different take on the Cuban sandwich, and explores "The Miami Sound" with Questlove, Willie Clark (the founder of Deep City Records) and 2 Live Crew's Luther Campbell. He also enjoys a surprisingly healthy meal with new Miami resident Iggy Pop.
39	4	"Scotland"	May 10, 2015
Tony visits one of his favorite cities in Europe, Glasgow. He makes his first stop at the Old College Bar for a pint, dines with Janey Godley, learns knife defense techniques from instructor Mark Davies, and tests his physical endurance while stalking red stag with writer A.A. Gill in the Scottish Highlands. Along the way he indulges in some surprising Scottish fare including deep-fried haggis, roasted grouse with bread sauce, and fresh venison.
40	5	"Madagascar"	May 17, 2015
With acclaimed film director Darren Aronofsky as his travel companion, Tony explores this island nation off the southeastern coast of Africa. Starting the journey in the chaotic, crowded capital city Tana, they sample the cuisine of legendary Malagasy chef Mariette Andrianjaka.
41	6	"New Jersey"	May 31, 2015
Bourdain travels to his childhood home state with his brother Chris and rekindles memories at classic roadside joint Hiram's, known for its fried hotdogs, and Barnegat Light in Ocean County. He heads further down the shore to Atlantic City and stops by the Knife and Fork, Docks Oyster House with local reporter Brian Donohue, the Baltimore Grill to see husband and wife comedians Rich Vos and Bonnie McFarlane, and tours Asbury Park with none other than famed musician Southside Johnny. Trips to Camden and the Pine Barrens are included as well.
42	7	"Budapest"	June 7, 2015
Drawing inspiration from iconic Hungarian born cinematographer Vilmos Zsigmond, Bourdain explores the beauty, culture, history, architecture and food of Budapest. The culinary dishes sampled during his journey include goulash, fisherman's soup, blood sausage, stuffed cabbage and, during a stop at restaurant Pleh Csarda, a golden brown pancake heaped with chicken liver and bone marrow, fried schnitzel and venison stew.
43	8	"Hawaii"	June 14, 2015
Bourdain explores the other Hawaii, the one that the 8 million tourists don't see when they descend on the islands every year. Tony meets with travel writer and novelist Paul Theroux, Chef Andrew Le of Pig and the Lady in Honolulu, talent manager Shep Gordon and communes with residents of Molokai for a meal at an ancient oceanside fish pond.
44	9	"Beirut"	June 21, 2015
The season five finale takes the host back to Beirut. Nicknamed "The Paris of the Middle East," its nightlife is infamous, the population beautiful, and its cuisine legendary. During his travels, Bourdain meets up with freestyle artist Double A The Preecherman in the Mar Mikhael neighborhood, has a classic Lebanese meal with writer, publisher, activist Joumana Haddad, and visits a Syrian community in southern Beirut with CNN correspondent Nick Paton Walsh.

=== Season 6 (2015) ===
Season 6 aired from September to November 2015.

No. overall	No. in season	Title	Original release date
45	1	"Prime Cuts: Season Five"	September 27, 2015
A retrospective of season five and preview of season six.
46	2	"Cuba"	September 27, 2015
Bourdain explores Cuba from its bustling capital city Havana, to the slower paced music mecca Santiago.
47	3	"Marseille, France"	October 4, 2015
Bourdain and travel companion chef Eric Ripert (Le Bernardin) visit France's oldest city to experience its stew of cultures and cuisines and eat as much Corsican cheeses as they can handle. Georgiana Viou features.
48	4	"Okinawa, Japan"	October 11, 2015
The alluring island of Okinawa is explored by Bourdain from historical, political, cultural and culinary perspectives.
49	5	"Bay Area"	October 18, 2015
Bourdain takes a journey to the San Francisco Bay Area of California, an area being rapidly transformed due to a massive influx of money from Silicon Valley. He practices Brazilian jiu jitsu and enjoys soul food at Real Miss Ollie's.
50	6	"Ethiopia"	October 25, 2015
Bourdain visits Addis Ababa to sample injera bread, beyaynetu platters, coffee and music with famed chef Marcus Samuelsson.
51	7	"Borneo"	November 1, 2015
Bourdain returns to Borneo after 10 years to fulfill his promise. He revisits the Dayak Iban longhouse which welcomed him with open arms, heart and soul, and to celebrate Gawai, the harvest festival, with the Iban community. Before travelling to the village, he savors laksa for breakfast at Kuching, the capital of the state of Sarawak in East Malaysia.
52	8	"Istanbul"	November 8, 2015
Bourdain explores the mixing of food, culture and politics in Istanbul, where he eats a Turkish breakfast and watches an oil wrestling match.
53	9	"Charleston, SC"	November 15, 2015
Bourdain visits Charleston, home to renowned Chef Sean Brock, who takes Bourdain to the Waffle House where the duo enjoy a late-night sampling of Waffle House fare. Later, they attend a Charleston RiverDogs game with actor Bill Murray; Murray accompanies them to Brock's restaurant Husk where the restaurant's innovative-yet-traditional Southern cooking is put on display. They also explore traditional Gullah cuisine on James Island. Brock introduces Bourdain to a unique commercial fishing venture based in Charleston Harbor, as well as Scott's Pit BBQ owned and operated by Rodney Scott in Hemingway, South Carolina.

=== Season 7 (2016) ===
Source: The season finale (Buenos Aires) was moved to Season 8 when its original broadcast was pre-empted by coverage of the Orlando nightclub shooting.

No. overall	No. in season	Title	Original release date
54	1	"Prime Cuts: Season Six"	April 24, 2016
A retrospective of season six and preview of season seven.
55	2	"Manila, Philippines"	April 24, 2016
It is Christmas time, and a typhoon has forced Tony and crew to stay in Manila instead of venturing further out. Tony enjoys local specialties like sizzling sisig and halo-halo, explores the phenomenon of the Philippines' internationally-famous cover bands, and meets with the former nanny of one of the show's producers, who, though now retired, spent much of her life abroad caring for other people's children in order to provide for her own family. The episode is notable for a Tagalog-language cover of the series' intro theme. The song was translated by Jared Uy, one of the members of the featured bands
56	3	"Chicago"	May 1, 2016
Anthony and company explore the Windy City's culture, regarding its history, professional sports, as well as the city's notorious murder rate, including sit-downs with rapper Lupe Fiasco, as well as Punk icon and record producer Steve Albini over fried steak sandwiches at Ricobene's.
57	4	"The Greek Islands"	May 8, 2016
Anthony visits the Greek island of Naxos, with a focus on local fishermen and life by the Mediterranean Sea. The ongoing Greek government-debt crisis at the time of filming is also referenced throughout.
58	5	"Montana"	May 15, 2016
Anthony travels to "Big Sky Country" Montana, and its tranquil lifestyle. Tony visits the Crow Indian Reservation to view a traditional horse relay race. Later, Tony goes on a pheasant hunt with comedian/MMA color commentator Joe Rogan. From there, Bourdain takes part in a Butte institution the Supper club, then traverses the Orphan Boy mine. Bourdain spends time with an old friend, the late American writer Jim Harrison, whom the episode is dedicated to.
59	6	"Tbilisi, Georgia"	May 22, 2016
Tony traverses through the Asian republic of Georgia. He stops in the capital of Tbilisi, resort town of Batumi (with longtime show companion Zamir Gotta), and Khurvaleti, which borders South Ossetia and the Occupied territories of Georgia.
60	7	"Senegal"	May 29, 2016
The unique culture of Senegal is explored, with focus on its fresh coastal cuisine, multiethnic populace and Sufi Islam. Tony meets with singer Youssou N'Dour, among other Senegalese celebrities, in this episode.
61	8	"Cologne, Germany"	June 5, 2016
The tolerant German city of Cologne is featured, with focus on the annual Cologne Carnival, Kölsch beer and its role in the European migrant crisis.

=== Season 8 (2016) ===
Season 8 aired from September to December 2016, and notably features an interview with U.S. president Barack Obama. Episode 8 (Buenos Aires) was originally scheduled as the Season 7 finale, but was pre-empted by coverage of the Orlando nightclub shooting.

No. overall	No. in season	Title	Original release date
63	1	"Prime Cuts: Season Seven"	September 24, 2016
A retrospective of season seven and preview of season eight.
64	2	"Hanoi"	September 25, 2016
Bourdain explores Hanoi and finds how Vietnam is thriving and growing in the 21st century. In a scene on a rented steamship the theme song from the James Bond movie You Only Live Twice plays. Anthony interviews briefly and dines with President Barack Obama.
65	3	"Nashville"	October 2, 2016
The city's traditional reputation as a country music epicenter is transposed with an influx of new residents and cuisines. Traditional Nashville favorites such as hot chicken are explored along with modern takes on Southern cuisine, as is the rapidly-expanding and diverse local music scene.
66	4	"Sichuan"	October 16, 2016
Michelin star chef Éric Ripert is introduced to China and Sichuan province by good friend Bourdain who intentionally tortures him with mouth-numbing, sinisterly spicy meals such as Hot pots, green peppercorn fish...etc. and tests his endurance and adaptability to Chinese cooking skills with friendliness.
67	5	"London"	October 23, 2016
Tony returns to London, a bastion of pro-European Union sentiment, now facing an uncertain future after the dramatic Brexit vote. Bourdain delves into the traditional strengths of London food culture with chefs like Nigella Lawson, Marco Pierre White and Fergus and Margot Henderson. Cartoonist Ralph Steadman discusses his work, as well as his thoughts on Brexit. Bourdain enjoys a chip butty for the first time with Marco, and has a late-night snack with guitarist Jamie Hince of The Kills.
68	6	"Houston"	October 30, 2016
Tony showcases the extreme ethnic diversity of Houston, Texas. Anthony visits the Little India neighborhood; attends a quinceañera, meets with refugee students at Lee High School, as well as the principal, himself a former Vietnamese refugee; explores African-American "slab" car culture with rapper Slim Thug; meets Vietnamese fishermen and Congolese farmers; and attends an Indian cricket game.
69	7	"Japan with Masa"	November 13, 2016
Bourdain explores Japan with Michelin star chef Masa Takayama for a homecoming of sorts, especially Ishikawa Prefecture and Tochigi Prefecture. They indulge in both seafood and mainland produce done in numerous ways with simplicity and reflection of Japanese striving spirit. Bourdain is also given a masterclass on umami and its closeness to the flow of life in general, and sees how these Japanese experiences shaped and molded his friend Masa.
70	8	"Buenos Aires"	November 20, 2016
A carouse through Argentina, where chicken is considered vegan and psychoanalysis is a part of everyday life. An inculcation to the thinning middle class, successful integration of multiculturalism and to their pastimes such as weekly carnivals, amateur football and laid back airplane counting.
71	9	"Minas Gerais, Brazil"	November 27, 2016
Tony visits the fast-growing but relatively-unknown state of Minas Gerais and explores its local cuisine, including the "infamous" pequi fruit, cachaça, feijão tropeiro (cattleman's beans), blood sausage and mocotó. He meets with an Afro-Brazilian family and discusses the vast African influence on Mineiro culture. He also visits the giant contemporary art museum Inhotim, and talks to its founder, eccentric mining magnate Bernardo Paz.
72	10	"Rome"	December 4, 2016
Tony visits Rome, Italy and explores the city and cuisine with actress Asia Argento. CNN pulled the episode from streaming in 2018 following assault allegations against Argento

=== Season 9 (2017) ===
Season 9 was broadcast from April to July 2017. The final two episodes were delayed one week when coverage of the attack near the Finsbury Park mosque pre-empted the June 18, 2017, broadcast.

No. overall	No. in season	Title	Original release date
73	1	"Prime Cuts: Season Eight"	April 23, 2017
A retrospective of season eight and preview of season nine.
74	2	"Los Angeles"	April 30, 2017
75	3	"San Sebastian"	May 7, 2017
76	4	"Laos"	May 14, 2017
77	5	"Queens"	May 21, 2017
An examination of the multi-cultural aspects of the easternmost borough of New York City.
78	6	"Antarctica"	June 4, 2017
79	7	"Oman"	June 11, 2017
80	8	"Trinidad"	June 25, 2017
81	9	"Porto, Portugal"	July 2, 2017

=== Season 10 (2017) ===
Season 10 premiered on October 1, 2017. In the premiere, Bourdain traveled to Singapore. Other locations include the French Alps, Lagos, Pittsburgh, Sri Lanka, Puerto Rico, Seattle, and Southern Italy. On November 12, 2017, the show was pre-empted when Bourdain presented his documentary Jeremiah Tower, The Last Magnificent, exploring America's first celebrity chef.

No. overall	No. in season	Title	Original release date	U.S. viewers (millions)
82	1	"Singapore"	October 1, 2017	0.81
Tony enjoys Singapore's "hawker center" food culture, and discusses its reputation as "Disneyland with the death penalty" with locals including street food expert K. F. Seetoh, entertainer Najip Ali, party organizer Michael Ma and chef Damian D'Silva.
83	2	"French Alps"	October 8, 2017	0.68
Accompanied by his friend Eric Ripert, Anthony visits the ski resort town of Chamonix, samples cheese dishes like fondue and raclette, and ends with a trip over the Italian border to the Aosta Valley.
84	3	"Lagos, Nigeria"	October 15, 2017	0.70
Anthony witnesses the hustling culture in the city of 20 million people, where there is a massive gulf between the ultra-rich at Victoria Island and the shanty town of Makoko. He is introduced to Nigeria's burgeoning IT economy through the Computer Village at Ikeja and the talent marketplace company Andela. He notes how the area boys collect tolls, learns of the legacy of Afrobeat pioneer Fela Kuti, and watches a Dambe martial arts match. Along the way, he samples Nigerian cuisine dishes such as egusi soup, peppersoup, pounded yam, amala and jollof rice.
85	4	"Pittsburgh"	October 22, 2017	0.71
Pittsburgh, Pennsylvania was a major industrial center with a heavily Central European working base that fell on hard times in the 1980s, before undergoing a current high tech resurgence. Tony discusses the city's past and present with local novelist Stewart O'Nan, activist Sala Udin, wrestlers Britt Baker and Adam Cole, and various young local chefs. He visits the distressed suburb of Braddock with documentarian Tony Buba. In Braddock, he enjoys a meal by local star chef Kevin Sousa with mayor John Fetterman and ex-football player Franco Harris. He attends a demolition derby in nearby New Alexandria.
86	5	"Sri Lanka"	October 29, 2017	0.61
The last time Tony was in Sri Lanka, the country was in the midst of a long-running civil war. Now, nearly a decade later, he returns to find a country at peace but still physically and emotionally scarred by the war. In Colombo, he attends a rehearsal of a play about the country's refugee crisis, and in Jaffna he observes a ritual Garudan Thookkam ceremony.
87	6	"Puerto Rico"	November 5, 2017	1.11
Anthony visits an island reeling from high unemployment and austerity measures as a result of the Puerto Rican government-debt crisis, and the situation would be made worse in weeks when Hurricane Maria devastated the territory. Anthony sits down to chat with locals on ways to improve the island's economy and the territory's complicated relationship with the United States, all while sharing Puerto Rican dishes like escabeche, sancocho, mofongo, arepas, and lechón asado.
88	7	"Seattle"	November 19, 2017	0.68
Tony visits Seattle, which has been rapidly transforming from the "city of grunge" to the "city of geeks". Tony discusses the gentrification of the city with local indie band The Gods Themselves, Capitol Hill-based street artist John Criscitello, and the founders of GeekWire. Tony samples the product at a local marijuana dispensary, and discusses business with the proprietors of a family-owned marijuana farm outside the city. He visits tech mogul-turned-culinary expert Nathan Myhrvold, and samples Myhrvold's latest project, innovative bread. He enjoys a clam bake with the founders of local cooking website ChefSteps. He dines with singer-songwriter Mark Lanegan, and the last part of the episode shows various of the episode's interviewees lip syncing to Lanegan's song "Strange Religion".
89	8	"Southern Italy"	November 26, 2017	0.66
Anthony explores various places in Apulia and Basilicata with Francis Ford Coppola and Asia Argento. CNN pulled the episode from streaming in 2018 following assault allegations against Argento.

=== Season 11 (2018) ===
Season 11 premiered on April 29, 2018, and took Bourdain on excursions to West Virginia, Uruguay, Newfoundland, Armenia, Hong Kong, Berlin, Louisiana, and Bhutan.

No. overall	No. in season	Title	Original release date	U.S. viewers (millions)
90	1	"West Virginia"	April 29, 2018	1.13
91	2	"Uruguay"	May 6, 2018	0.73
92	3	"Newfoundland"	May 13, 2018	0.73
Anthony Bourdain explores the rocky, east-coast Canadian island of Newfoundland, a place abundant in fish and wild game and steeped in distinctive traditions; Anthony's guide is prominent chef Jeremy Charles.
93	4	"Armenia"	May 20, 2018	0.76
94	5	"Hong Kong"	June 3, 2018	0.63
CNN pulled the episode from streaming in 2018 following assault allegations against Argento
95	6	"Berlin"	June 10, 2018	1.22
Despite, or perhaps even because of, its tragic past, Berlin remains a haven for artists and thrill-seekers from around the world. Tony samples local favorites including wiener schnitzel, doner kebab and eisbein and discusses the past and present of Berlin's art scene with Berliners including a club bouncer, musicians Ellen Allien and Anton Newcombe, cabaret entertainer Le Pustra, and photographer Jim Rakete. This episode aired immediately after Bourdain's death, and begins with an introduction by CNN anchor Anderson Cooper.
96	7	"Cajun Mardi Gras"	June 17, 2018	1.20
97	8	"Bhutan"	June 24, 2018	1.06
Tony visits the secluded kingdom of Bhutan with filmmaker Darren Aronofsky. The two enjoy foods such as momo, yak meat, butter tea and ara, and explore Bhutan's Buddhist traditions, including its phallus paintings. They discuss environmental change with conservationist Paljor Dorji.

=== Season 12 (2018) ===
"He has changed the way we see the world. He has changed the way television covers travel shows and food shows... ...Who would have known what happened in Congo or in Libya except through his eyes? He was giving a voice to people. His show was not a food show. It was not a travel show. It was much bigger than that. All of this, I think, it's something that will never be forgotten."

— Éric Ripert

On June 8, 2018, Bourdain was found dead by his friend and collaborator Éric Ripert of an apparent suicide by hanging in his room at Le Chambard hotel in Kaysersberg, France. They had been filming an episode in nearby Strasbourg.

In August 2018, CNN announced that it would broadcast a final season of the series, with a premiere date later set for September 23, 2018. As only one episode (which featured a trip to Kenya with W. Kamau Bell, host of fellow CNN docuseries United Shades of America) was fully completed before Bourdain's death, four of the season's episodes (on Manhattan's Lower East Side, Indonesia, Spain's mountainous Asturias region, and the Texas "Big Bend" area bordering Mexico) were completed using narration and additional interviews provided by guests who were featured in each episode, while the other two episodes act as retrospectives focusing on the show's production, and a tribute to the impact of Bourdain's life. The episode shot in Alsace at the time of Bourdain's death was not aired; it would have featured scenes of Ripert showing Bourdain around sights and restaurants along the Franco-German border.

The closing credits of the final episode, which featured a tour of the Lower East Side of Manhattan, ran while a cover of the Johnny Thunders song "You Can't Put Your Arms Around a Memory" played. Prior to his death, Bourdain asked Parts Unknown music director Michael Ruffino to record a cover version for the show; the recording was not made until after Bourdain's death, and Ruffino asked Bourdain's daughter Ariane to contribute backing vocals.

No. overall	No. in season	Title	Original release date	U.S. viewers (millions)
98	1	"Kenya"	September 23, 2018	1.04
99	2	"Asturias, Spain"	September 30, 2018	0.74
100	3	"Indonesia"	October 7, 2018	0.57
101	4	"Tony's Impact"	October 14, 2018	0.67
102	5	"Far West Texas"	October 21, 2018	0.88
103	6	"Under the Tarp"	October 28, 2018	0.66
104	7	"Lower East Side"	November 11, 2018	0.78

== Availability ==
The series has not been released on DVD or Blu-ray. Besides being broadcast on CNN, the show has been made available on demand through cable on-demand services as well as from streaming video providers including HBO Max (in the United States) and Netflix (internationally). The series is also available for purchase on the iTunes Store, Vudu, and Amazon Video. CNN has also released the series as an audio-only podcast.

The show was shot in high definition, and made available for streaming in both standard definition and high definition.

Following the conclusion of the final season, a special edition collection of the entire series, featuring a Prime Cuts: Through The Years compilation has been made available for purchase on the iTunes Store. On May 27, 2020, with the launch of HBO Max, the entire series was made available for streaming, omitting the Prime Cuts episodes. Following the launch of CNN+ on March 29, 2022, the full episode library moved to that service, leaving HBO Max with only 8 episodes. Despite CNN+'s quick shut down just 30 days later. On August 19, 2022, the full episode library began streaming on Discovery Plus as part of an extensive library of CNN shows that moved there following the shutdown of CNN+. Currently, the entire series is streaming on HBO Max again.

== Awards and nominations ==
Year	Award	Category	Nominated work	Result	Ref.
2013	Producers Guild of America Awards	Best Non-Fiction Television	Anthony Bourdain: Parts Unknown	Won	
2013	Peabody Award		Anthony Bourdain: Parts Unknown	Won	
2013	American Cinema Editors Awards	Best Edited Non-Scripted Series	Nick Brigden (for "Tokyo")	Won	
2013	Primetime Creative Arts Emmy Awards	Outstanding Informational Series or Special	Anthony Bourdain, Christopher Collins, Lydia Tenaglia, Sandra Zweig, Nick Brigden, Michael Steed, Tom Vitale, Jared Andrukanis	Won	
2013	Primetime Creative Arts Emmy Awards	Outstanding Cinematography for a Nonfiction Program	Todd Liebler, Zach Zamboni and Morgan Fallon (for "Myanmar")	Won	
2013	Primetime Creative Arts Emmy Awards	Outstanding Sound Mixing for a Nonfiction or Reality Program (Single or Multi-Camera)	Benny Mouthon (for "Myanmar")	Nominated	
2013	Primetime Creative Arts Emmy Awards	Outstanding Writing for a Nonfiction Programming	Anthony Bourdain (for "Libya")	Nominated	
2014	Producers Guild of America Awards	Best Non-Fiction Television	Anthony Bourdain: Parts Unknown	Nominated	
2014	American Cinema Editors Awards	Best Edited Non-Scripted Series	Hunter Gross (for "Iran")	Won	
2014	Primetime Creative Arts Emmy Awards	Outstanding Informational Series or Special	Anthony Bourdain, Christopher Collins, Lydia Tenaglia, Sandra Zweig, Nick Brigden, Michael Steed, Tom Vitale, Jared Andrukanis	Won	
2014	Primetime Creative Arts Emmy Awards	Outstanding Cinematography for a Nonfiction Program	Todd Liebler and Zach Zamboni (for "Punjab")	Nominated	
2014	Primetime Creative Arts Emmy Awards	Outstanding Cinematography for a Nonfiction Program	Morgan Fallon (for "Tokyo")	Nominated	
2014	Primetime Creative Arts Emmy Awards	Outstanding Picture Editing for a Nonfiction Program	Nick Brigden (for "Tokyo")	Nominated	
2014	Primetime Creative Arts Emmy Awards	Outstanding Sound Editing for a Nonfiction or Reality Program (Single or Multi-Camera)	Benny Mouthon and Hunter Gross (for "Punjab")	Nominated	
2014	Primetime Creative Arts Emmy Awards	Outstanding Sound Mixing for a Nonfiction or Reality Program (Single or Multi-Camera)	Brian Bracken (for "Tokyo")	Nominated	
2014	Primetime Creative Arts Emmy Awards	Outstanding Writing for a Nonfiction Programming	Anthony Bourdain (for "Congo")	Nominated	
2015	Producers Guild of America Awards	Best Non-Fiction Television	Anthony Bourdain: Parts Unknown	Nominated	
2015	Critics' Choice Television Awards	Best Reality Series	Anthony Bourdain: Parts Unknown	Nominated	
2015	Critics' Choice Television Awards	Best Reality Show Host	Anthony Bourdain	Nominated	
2015	Cinema Audio Society Awards	Outstanding Achievement in Sound Mixing for Television Non Fiction, Variety or Music – Series or Specials	Benny Mouthon (for "Madagascar")	Nominated	
2015	American Cinema Editors Awards	Best Edited Non-Scripted Series	Hunter Gross (for "Bay Area")	Won	
2015	Primetime Creative Arts Emmy Awards	Outstanding Informational Series or Special	Anthony Bourdain, Christopher Collins, Lydia Tenaglia, Sandra Zweig, Tom Vitale, Erik Osterholm	Won	
2015	Primetime Creative Arts Emmy Awards	Outstanding Sound Editing for a Nonfiction or Reality Program (Single or Multi-Camera)	Benny Mouthon (for "Madagascar")	Nominated	
2015	Primetime Creative Arts Emmy Awards	Outstanding Sound Mixing for a Nonfiction or Reality Program (Single or Multi-Camera)	Brian Bracken (for "Jamaica")	Nominated	
2015	Primetime Creative Arts Emmy Awards	Outstanding Writing for a Nonfiction Programming	Anthony Bourdain (for "Iran")	Nominated	
2016	Producers Guild of America Awards	Best Non-Fiction Television	Anthony Bourdain: Parts Unknown	Nominated	
2016	Critics' Choice Television Awards	Best Unstructured Reality Show	Anthony Bourdain: Parts Unknown	Won	
2016	Cinema Audio Society Awards	Outstanding Achievement in Sound Mixing for Television Non Fiction, Variety or Music – Series or Specials	Benny Mouthon (for "Hanoi")	Nominated	
2016	American Cinema Editors Awards	Best Edited Non-Scripted Series	Mustafa Bhagat (for "Senegal")	Won	
2016	American Cinema Editors Awards	Best Edited Non-Scripted Series	Hunter Gross (for "Manila, Philippines")	Nominated	
2016	Primetime Creative Arts Emmy Awards	Outstanding Informational Series or Special	Anthony Bourdain, Christopher Collins, Lydia Tenaglia, Sandra Zweig, Toby Oppenheimer, Mike Steed, Tom Vitale	Won	
2016	Primetime Creative Arts Emmy Awards	Outstanding Cinematography for a Nonfiction Program	Todd Liebler and Zach Zamboni (for "Cuba")	Nominated	
2016	Primetime Creative Arts Emmy Awards	Outstanding Sound Editing for a Nonfiction or Reality Program (Single or Multi-Camera)	Brian Bracken and Nick Brigden (for "Okinawa")	Nominated	
2016	Primetime Creative Arts Emmy Awards	Outstanding Sound Mixing for a Nonfiction or Reality Program (Single or Multi-Camera)	Benny Mouthon (for "Ethiopia")	Nominated	
2016	Primetime Creative Arts Emmy Awards	Outstanding Writing for a Nonfiction Programming	Anthony Bourdain (for "Borneo")	Nominated	
2017	Producers Guild of America Awards	Best Non-Fiction Television	Anthony Bourdain: Parts Unknown	Nominated	
2017	Critics' Choice Television Awards	Best Unstructured Reality Show	Anthony Bourdain: Parts Unknown	Won	
2017	Critics' Choice Television Awards	Best Reality Show Host	Anthony Bourdain	Won	
2017	Cinema Audio Society Awards	Outstanding Achievement in Sound Mixing for Television Non Fiction, Variety or Music – Series or Specials	Benny Mouthon (for "Oman")	Nominated	
2017	Primetime Creative Arts Emmy Awards	Outstanding Informational Series or Special	Anthony Bourdain, Christopher Collins, Lydia Tenaglia, Sandra Zweig, Tom Vitale, Jeffrey D. Allen	Nominated	
2017	Primetime Creative Arts Emmy Awards	Outstanding Cinematography for a Nonfiction Program	Todd Liebler and Zach Zamboni (for "Rome")	Nominated	
2017	Primetime Creative Arts Emmy Awards	Outstanding Sound Editing for a Nonfiction or Reality Program (Single or Multi-Camera)	Benny Mouthon (for "Hanoi")	Nominated	
2017	Primetime Creative Arts Emmy Awards	Outstanding Sound Mixing for a Nonfiction or Reality Program (Single or Multi-Camera)	Brian Bracken (for "Rome")	Nominated	
2017	Primetime Creative Arts Emmy Awards	Outstanding Writing for a Nonfiction Programming	Anthony Bourdain (for "Houston")	Nominated	
2018	Producers Guild of America Awards	Best Non-Fiction Television	Anthony Bourdain: Parts Unknown	Won	
2018	TCA Awards	Outstanding Achievement in News and Information	Anthony Bourdain: Parts Unknown	Won	
2018	Critics' Choice Documentary Awards	Best Ongoing Documentary Series	Anthony Bourdain: Parts Unknown	Won	
2018	Primetime Creative Arts Emmy Awards	Outstanding Informational Series or Special	Anthony Bourdain, Christopher Collins, Lydia Tenaglia, Sandra Zweig, Morgan Fallon	Won	
2018	Primetime Creative Arts Emmy Awards	Outstanding Cinematography for a Nonfiction Program	Morgan Fallon, Jerry Risius, Tarik Hameedi (for "Lagos")	Nominated	
2018	Primetime Creative Arts Emmy Awards	Outstanding Picture Editing for a Nonfiction Program	Hunter Gross (for "Lagos")	Won	
2018	Primetime Creative Arts Emmy Awards	Outstanding Sound Editing for a Nonfiction or Reality Program (Single or Multi-Camera)	Brian Bracken, Nick Brigden (for "Seattle")	Won	
2018	Primetime Creative Arts Emmy Awards	Outstanding Sound Mixing for a Nonfiction or Reality Program (Single or Multi-Camera)	Benny Mouthon (for "Lagos")	Won	
2018	Primetime Creative Arts Emmy Awards	Outstanding Writing for a Nonfiction Programming	Anthony Bourdain (for "Southern Italy")	Won	
2018	Cinema Audio Society Awards	Outstanding Achievement in Sound Mixing for Television Non Fiction, Variety or Music – Series or Specials	Benny Mouthon (for "Bhutan")	Won	
2018	American Cinema Editors Awards	Best Edited Non-Scripted Series	Hunter Gross (for "West Virginia")	Won	
2019	Primetime Creative Arts Emmy Awards	Outstanding Informational Series or Special	Anthony Bourdain, Christopher Collins, Lydia Tenaglia, Sandra Zweig, Jared Andrukanis, Michael Steed, Jonathan Cianfrani	Won	
2019	Primetime Creative Arts Emmy Awards	Outstanding Cinematography for a Nonfiction Program	Morgan Fallon, Todd Liebler and Zach Zamboni (for "Bhutan")	Nominated	
2019	Primetime Creative Arts Emmy Awards	Outstanding Picture Editing for a Nonfiction Program	Tom Patterson (for "Lower East Side")	Nominated	
2019	Primetime Creative Arts Emmy Awards	Outstanding Sound Editing for a Nonfiction or Reality Program (Single or Multi-Camera)	Benny Mouthon, Hunter Gross (for "Far West Texas")	Nominated	
2019	Primetime Creative Arts Emmy Awards	Outstanding Sound Mixing for a Nonfiction or Reality Program (Single or Multi-Camera)	Brian Bracken (for "Kenya")	Nominated	
2019	Primetime Creative Arts Emmy Awards	Outstanding Writing for a Nonfiction Programming	Anthony Bourdain (for "Kenya")	Won	
