= Critics' Choice Television Award for Best Structured Reality Show =

The Critics' Choice Television Award for Best Structured Reality Show is one of the award categories presented annually by the Critics' Choice Television Awards (BTJA). In 2016, the category Best Reality Series was separated into two categories – Best Structured Reality Show and Best Unstructured Reality Show. The winners are selected by a group of television critics that are part of the Broadcast Television Critics Association.

== Winners and nominees ==
=== Best Reality Series ===
Year	Show
2010-2011	Hoarders
2010-2011	The Real Housewives of Beverly Hills
2010-2011	Extreme Makeover: Home Edition
2010-2011	Sister Wives
2010-2011	Undercover Boss
2011-2012	Anthony Bourdain: No Reservations
2011-2012	Hoarders
2011-2012	Kitchen Nightmares
2011-2012	Pawn Stars
2011-2012	Sister Wives
2011-2012	Undercover Boss
2012-2013	Duck Dynasty
2012-2013	Push Girls
2012-2013	The Moment
2012-2013	Pawn Stars
2012-2013	Small Town Security
2012-2013	Wild Things with Dominic Monaghan
2013-2014	Cosmos: A Spacetime Odyssey
2013-2014	Deadliest Catch
2013-2014	Duck Dynasty
2013-2014	MythBusters
2013-2014	Top Gear
2013-2014	Undercover Boss
2014-15	Shark Tank
2014-15	Anthony Bourdain: Parts Unknown
2014-15	Deadliest Catch
2014-15	Married at First Sight
2014-15	MythBusters
2014-15	Undercover Boss

=== Best Structured Reality Series ===
Year	Show
2015 (2)	Shark Tank
2015 (2)	Antiques Roadshow
2015 (2)	Inside the Actors Studio
2015 (2)	MythBusters
2015 (2)	Project Greenlight
2015 (2)	Undercover Boss
2016	Shark Tank
2016	Chopped
2016	Inside the Actors Studio
2016	Penn & Teller: Fool Us
2016	Project Runway
2016	Undercover Boss
2017	Shark Tank
2017	The Carbonaro Effect
2017	Fixer Upper
2017	The Profit
2017	Undercover Boss
2017	Who Do You Think You Are?

== See also ==
- Structured reality
- TCA Award for Outstanding Achievement in Reality Programming
- Primetime Emmy Award for Outstanding Structured Reality Program
