= Critics' Choice Television Award for Best Unstructured Reality Show =

The Critics' Choice Television Award for Best Unstructured Reality Show is one of the award categories presented annually by the Critics' Choice Television Awards (BTJA). In 2016, the category Best Reality Series was separated into two categories – Best Unstructured Reality Show and Best Structured Reality Show. The winners are selected by a group of television critics that are part of the Broadcast Television Critics Association.

== Winners and nominees ==
=== Best Reality Series ===
Year	Show
2010-2011	Hoarders
2010-2011	The Real Housewives of Beverly Hills
2010-2011	Extreme Makeover: Home Edition
2010-2011	Sister Wives
2010-2011	Undercover Boss
2011-2012	Anthony Bourdain: No Reservations
2011-2012	Hoarders
2011-2012	Kitchen Nightmares
2011-2012	Pawn Stars
2011-2012	Sister Wives
2011-2012	Undercover Boss
2012-2013	Duck Dynasty
2012-2013	Push Girls
2012-2013	The Moment
2012-2013	Pawn Stars
2012-2013	Small Town Security
2012-2013	Wild Things with Dominic Monaghan
2013-2014	Cosmos: A Spacetime Odyssey
2013-2014	Deadliest Catch
2013-2014	Duck Dynasty
2013-2014	MythBusters
2013-2014	Top Gear
2013-2014	Undercover Boss
2014-15	Shark Tank
2014-15	Anthony Bourdain: Parts Unknown
2014-15	Deadliest Catch
2014-15	Married at First Sight
2014-15	MythBusters
2014-15	Undercover Boss

=== Best Unstructured Reality Show ===
Year	Show
2015 (2)	Anthony Bourdain: Parts Unknown
2015 (2)	Cops
2015 (2)	Deadliest Catch
2015 (2)	Intervention
2015 (2)	Naked and Afraid
2015 (2)	Pawn Stars
2016	Anthony Bourdain: Parts Unknown
2016	Chrisley Knows Best
2016	Deadliest Catch
2016	Ice Road Truckers
2016	Intervention
2016	Naked and Afraid
2017	Born This Way
2017	Ice Road Truckers
2017	Intervention
2017	Live PD
2017	Ride with Norman Reedus
2017	Teen Mom

== See also ==
- TCA Award for Outstanding Achievement in Reality Programming
- Primetime Emmy Award for Outstanding Unstructured Reality Program
