= Critics' Choice Television Award for Best Reality Series =

Annual award by the Broadcast Television Critics Association

The Critics' Choice Television Award for Best Reality Series was one of the award categories presented annually by the Critics' Choice Television Awards (BTJA). It was introduced in 2011 when the event was first initiated and last presented in 2015. The winners were selected by a group of television critics that are part of the Broadcast Television Critics Association.

== Winners and nominees ==
=== 2010s ===
Year	Show
2011	Hoarders
2011	The Real Housewives of Beverly Hills
2011	Extreme Makeover: Home Edition
2011	Sister Wives
2011	Undercover Boss
2012	Anthony Bourdain: No Reservations
2012	Hoarders
2012	Kitchen Nightmares
2012	Pawn Stars
2012	Sister Wives
2012	Undercover Boss
2013	Duck Dynasty
2013	Push Girls
2013	The Moment
2013	Pawn Stars
2013	Small Town Security
2013	Wild Things with Dominic Monaghan
2014	Cosmos: A Spacetime Odyssey
2014	Deadliest Catch
2014	Duck Dynasty
2014	MythBusters
2014	Undercover Boss
2014	Top Gear
2015	Shark Tank
2015	Anthony Bourdain: Parts Unknown
2015	Deadliest Catch
2015	Married at First Sight
2015	MythBusters
2015	Undercover Boss

== Multiple nominations ==
3 nominations

- Undercover Boss

2 nominations

- Duck Dynasty
- Hoarders
- Pawn Stars
- Sister Wives

== See also ==
- Primetime Emmy Award for Outstanding Reality Program
- TCA Award for Outstanding Achievement in Reality Programming
