= Kevin Sousa =

Kevin Sousa may refer to:

- Kevin Sousa (chef), American chef
- Kevin Sousa (footballer), Cabo Verdean footballer
