= Bún bò Huế =

Vietnamese beef noodle soup

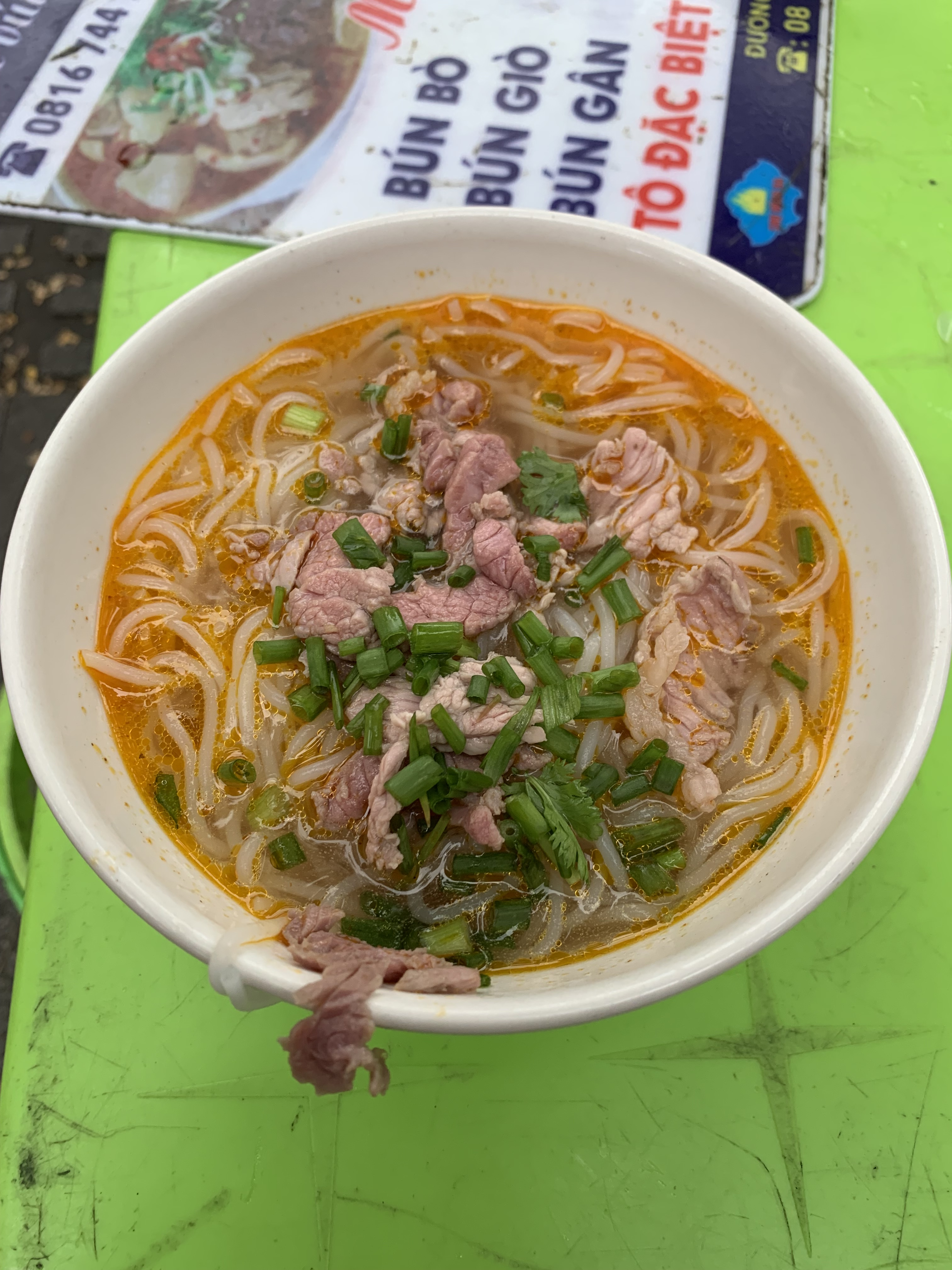
- A bowl of bún bò Huế served on the streets of Dong Ba Market, Huế
- Type: Soup
- Place of origin: Vietnam
- Region or state: Central Vietnam (Huế)
- Invented: 1585–1602
- Main ingredients: Rice vermicelli, lemongrass, beef, fermented shrimp sauce, pork knuckles, pig blood curds

Bún bò Huế (pronounced [ɓun˧˥ ɓɔ˧˩ hwe˧˥]) or bún bò (English: /buːn bɔː/) is a Vietnamese rice noodle (bún) dish with sliced beef (bò), chả lụa, and sometimes pork knuckles. The dish originates from Huế, a city in central Vietnam associated with the cooking style of the former royal court. The dish has a mix of spicy, salty, and savory flavors. The predominant flavors are those of lemongrass and shrimp paste. Compared to phở or bún riêu, the noodles are thicker and cylindrical.

== History ==
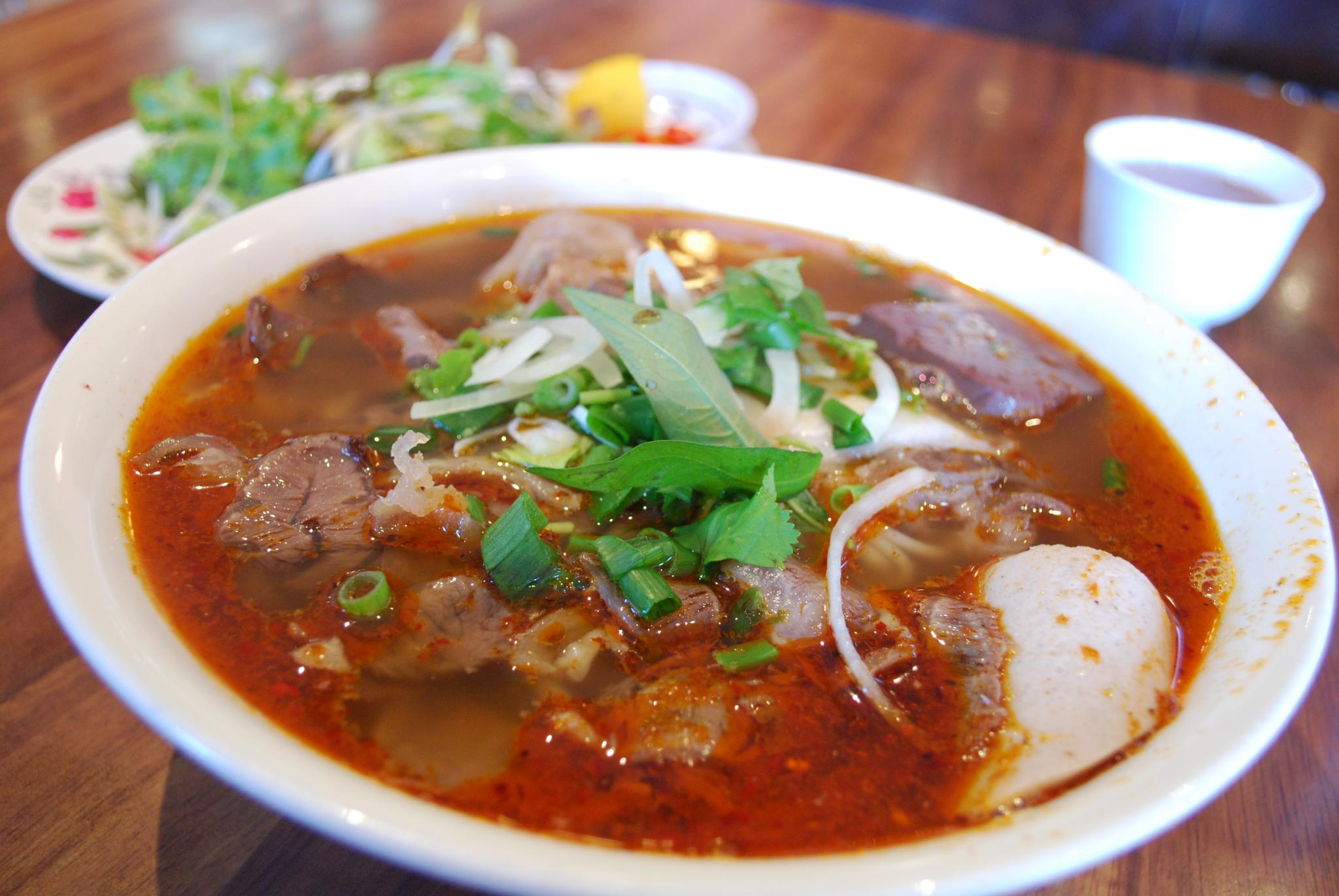
Bún bò Huế garnished with beef brisket, shank, coagulated pork blood, and chả lụa.

Bún bò hails from the city of Huế in central Vietnam in the late 1500s and early 1600s, when the city was ruled by the Nguyễn lords. This city, once the capital of Vietnam, has a rich culinary legacy linked to the former royal court of Annam. Beyond its hometown and certain areas in central Vietnam, the dish is often labeled bún bò Huế to indicate its place of origin and to differentiate it from bún bò found in Saigon (south) and Hanoi (north).

This classic dish is celebrated for its harmonious blend of spicy, sour, sweet, salty, and umami tastes. The scent of lemongrass prominently features. In comparison to dishes like phở and bún riêu, its vermicelli noodles are thicker and cylindrical. In its native Huế, bún bò is typically served only in the mornings as a main meal rather than a breakfast item. However, in other major Vietnamese cities, it can be found at various meal times.

There are some theories with the origin of bún bò huế. Some say it was historically catered for the royal family and high-ranking officials, and over time, it made its way from the royal kitchens to the street food stalls and homes across central Vietnam. Others claim of a legend of a young lady named Cô Bún (Ms. Noodles), who perfected noodle making and passed it down to her village of Vân Cù.

Vân Cù Village made a special attribution to bún bò huế, for their white and springy noodles that absorb broth without falling apart. They have been making noodles for over 400 years.

== Features ==
Outside the city of Huế, it is called bún bò Huế to denote its origin. Within Huế and surrounding cities, it is known simply as bún bò. The broth is prepared by simmering beef bones and beef shank with lemongrass, and then seasoned with fermented shrimp sauce and sugar for taste. Spicy chili oil is added later during the cooking process.

Another notable feature in the dish's flavor is the pot it is cooked in. It is traditional to use an aluminum pot with a round base and small opening, most commonly in Huế.

Bún bò usually includes thin slices of marinated and boiled beef shank, chunks of oxtail, and pork knuckles.

Bún bò is commonly served with lime wedges, cilantro sprigs, diced green onions, raw sliced onions, chili sauce, thinly sliced banana blossom, red cabbage, mint, basil, perilla, Persicaria odorata or Vietnamese coriander (rau răm), saw tooth herb (ngò gai) and sometimes mung bean sprouts. Thinly sliced purple cabbage is sometimes used as a substitute when banana blossoms are not available. Purple cabbage most resembles banana blossom in texture, though not in taste. Fish sauce and shrimp paste are added to the soup according to taste. Ingredients might be varied by region due to their availability.

Bún bò huế has regional variations across Huế (its origin), the North, and the South of Vietnam. In Saigon’s version of bún bò huế, chả lụa is added in place of crab cakes and blood cakes. Its distinct orange color is due to the addition of annatto seed oil. In Hanoi’s version of bún bò huế, there is sweetness in the broth from the beef legs and tendons. There are also some substitutes, like replacing crab cakes with meatballs, as they are not as popular with local eaters in the North.

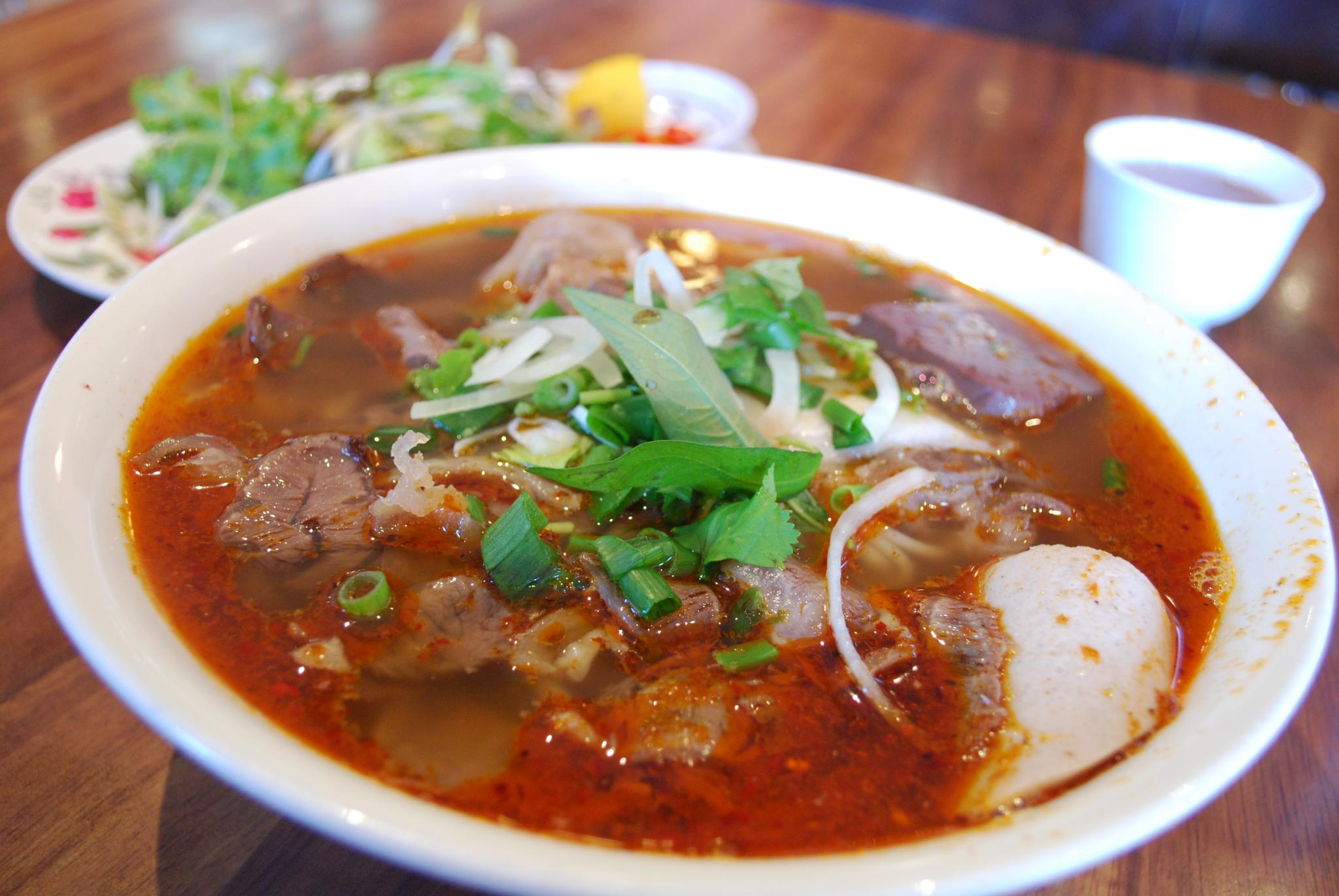
This version of bún bò Huế includes rice vermicelli, beef brisket, pork leg, pig blood curd, and other ingredients.

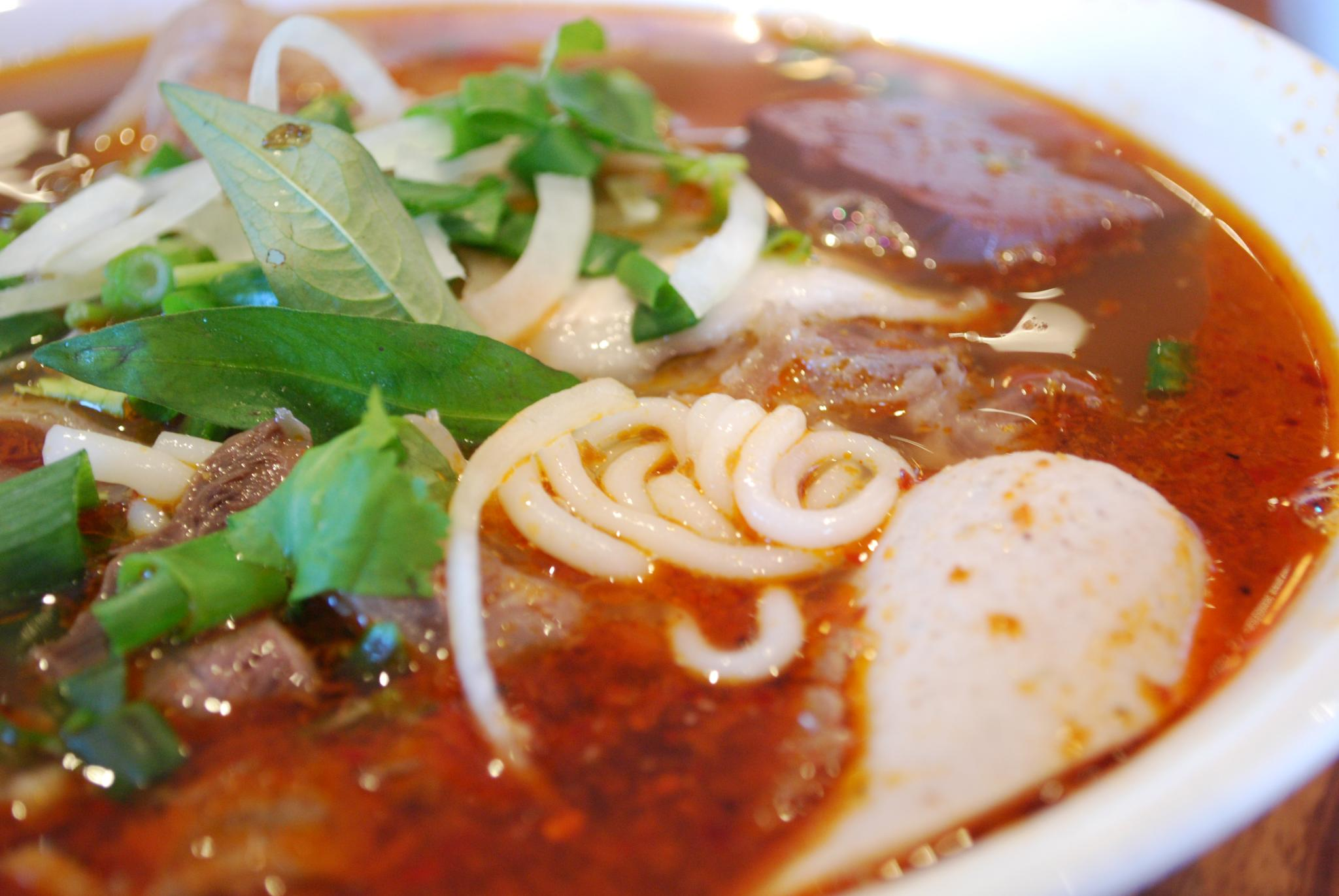
Close-up of the same dish

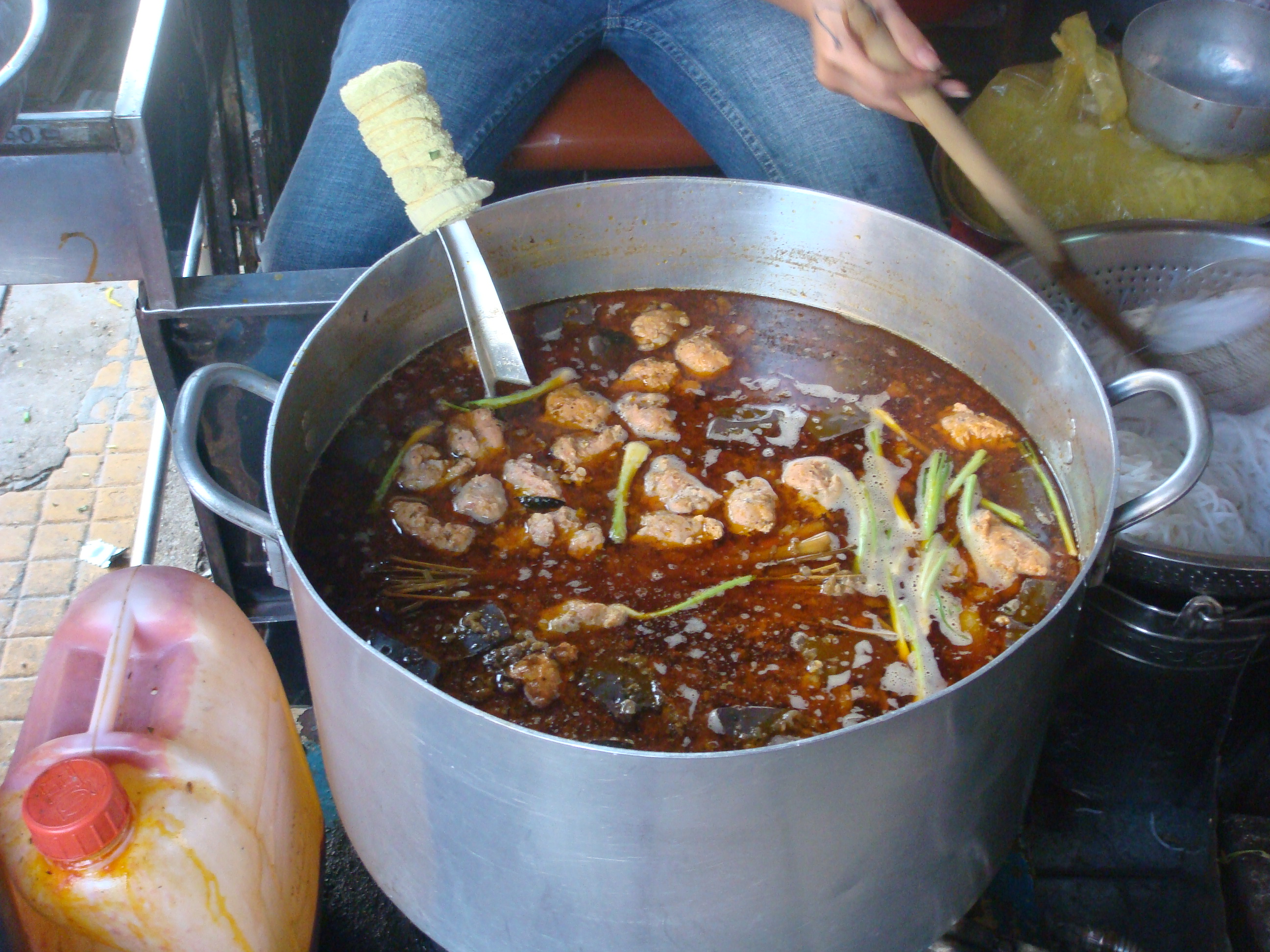
A pot of bún bò broth with rice noodles being cooked separately at a Ho Chi Minh City eatery

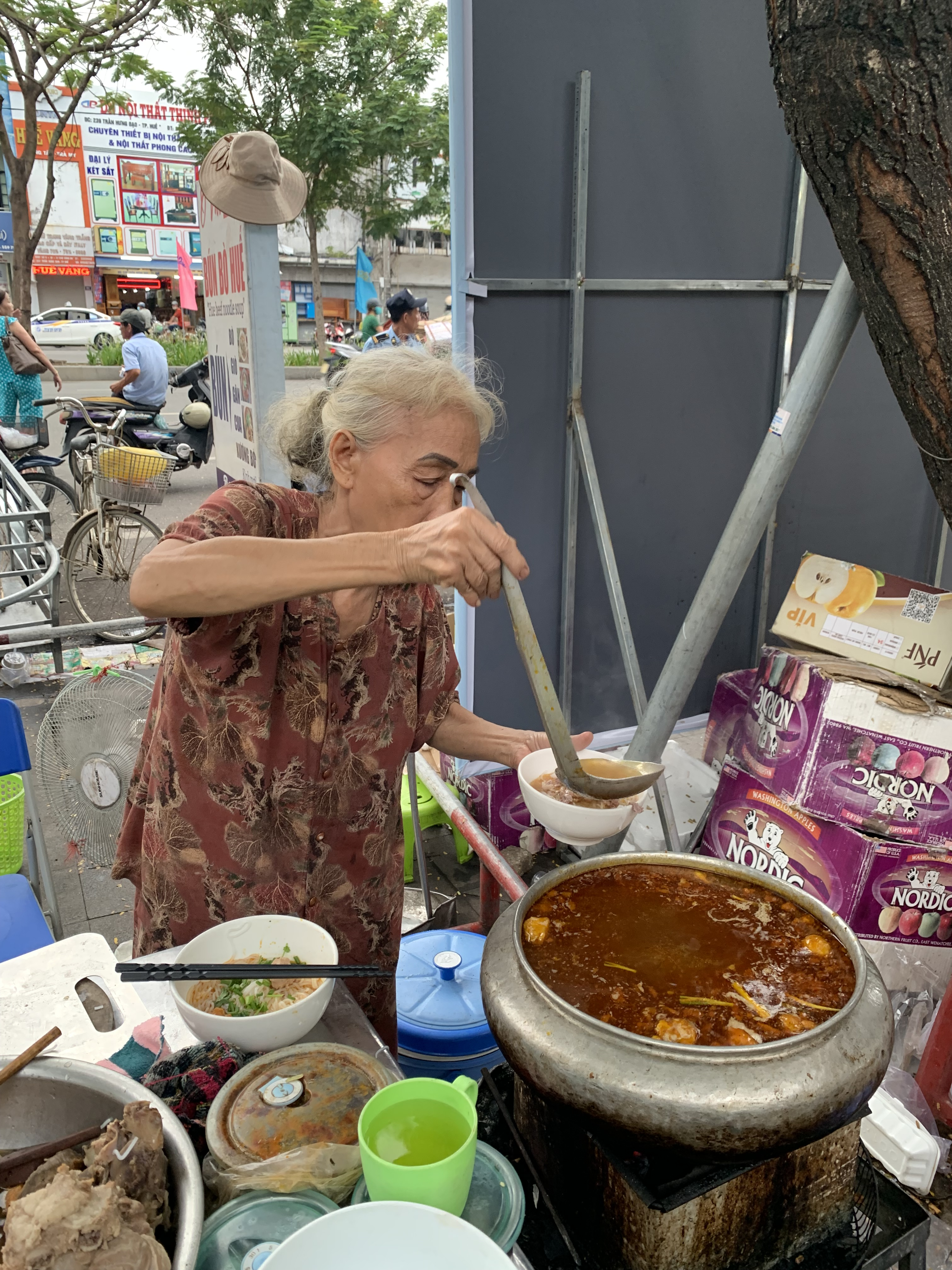
A lady preparing bún bò Huế at Dong Ba Market, Huế
