= Scripted reality =

Genre of reality TV

Scripted reality (sometimes also euphemized as structured reality or constructed reality) in television and entertainment is a subgenre of reality television with some or all of the contents being scripted or pre-arranged by the production company. While there is considerable overlap in the usage of the terms scripted reality TV and reality TV, the scripted variant will usually not leave the plot or the story's outcome to chance.

== Producers ==
Notable producers include

- MTV
- Pop
- RTL Television
- TF1
- TruTV
- ITV2
- E4

== Awards ==
- Primetime Emmy Award for Outstanding Structured Reality Program
- Critics' Choice Television Award for Best Structured Reality Show

== See also ==
- Reality television
- Criticism of reality television
- Docufiction
- Infotainment
