= Critics Choice Television Awards =

American television awards

Critics Choice Television Award
- Current: 31st Critics' Choice Awards
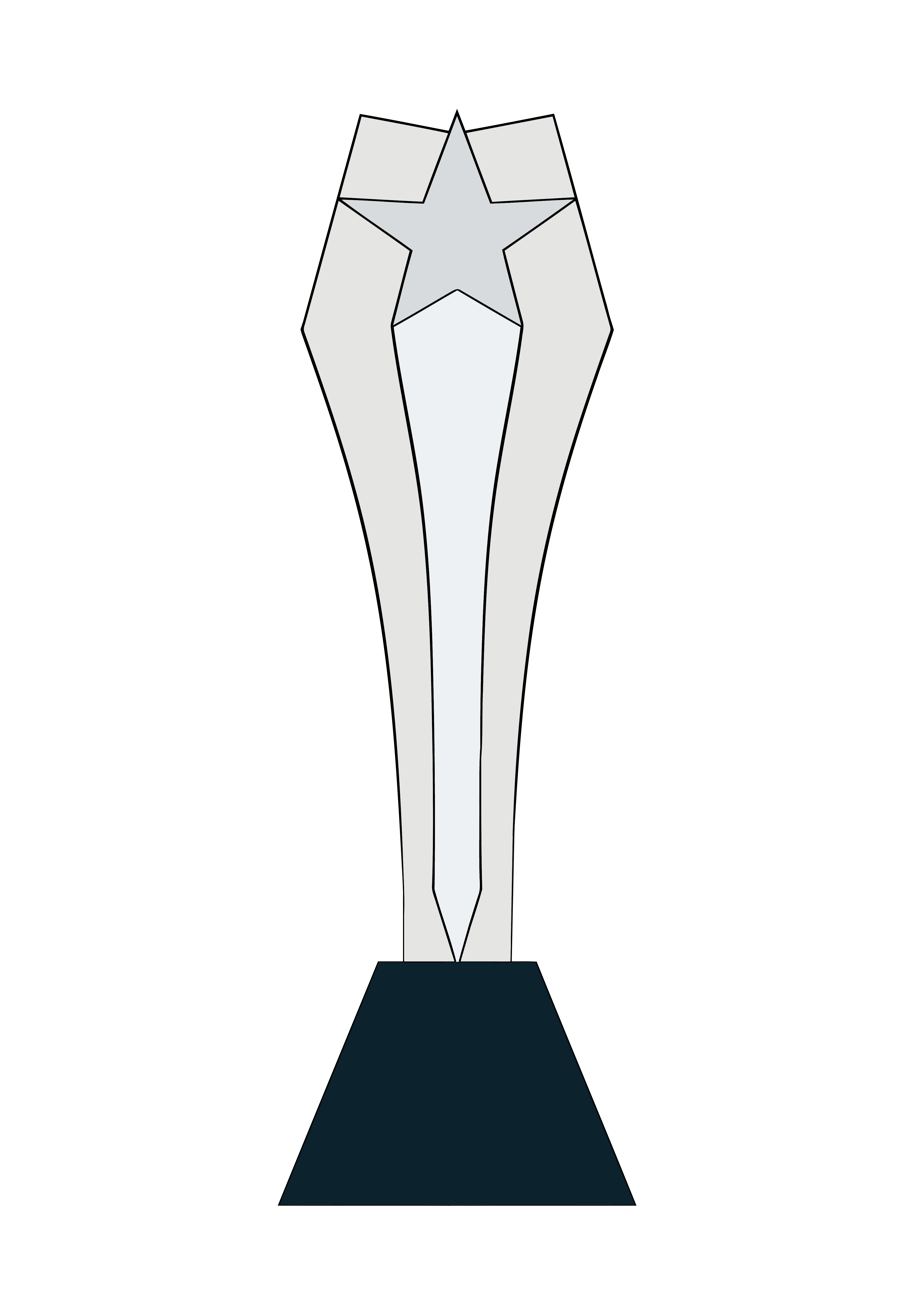
- Awarded for: Best in television
- Country: United States
- Presented by: CCA
- First award: 2011
- Website: www.criticschoice.com

The Critics Choice Television Awards were accolades that were presented annually by the Critics Choice Association (CCA). They were established in 2011, and the first ceremony was held on June 20, 2011, and streamed live on VH1.com. The fourth ceremony was televised live on June 19, 2014, on The CW. In October 2014, the A&E Network was granted exclusive rights to broadcast the television and film awards in 2015 and 2016. The final ceremony was in 2015, after which it was combined with the film awards and once again became the Critics Choice Awards.

== History ==
The Broadcast Television Journalists Association (BTJA) was founded in 2011 as an offshoot of the Broadcast Film Critics Association. The Awards were produced by executive producer Bob Bain.

According to the acting president of the BTJA, Joey Berlin, the Critics Choice Television Awards were launched "to enhance access for broadcast journalists covering the television industry. Just as the Critics Choice Awards has been established as an important part of the annual movie awards season, we are confident that the Critics Choice Television Awards will play a similar role for the television industry."

== Categories ==
- Best Actor in a Comedy Series (since 2011)
- Best Actor in a Drama Series (since 2011)
- Best Actor in a Movie/Miniseries (since 2012)
- Best Actress in a Comedy Series (since 2011)
- Best Actress in a Drama Series (since 2011)
- Best Actress in a Movie/Miniseries (since 2012)
- Best Animated Series (2012–2020, since 2022; presented at 1st Critics' Choice Super Awards in 2021)
- Best Comedy Series (since 2011)
- Best Drama Series (since 2011)
- Best Guest Performer in a Comedy Series (2012–2016)
- Best Guest Performer in a Drama Series (2012–2016)
- Best Movie/Miniseries (since 2012)
- Best Reality Series (2011–2015)
- Best Reality Series – Competition (since 2011)
- Best Reality Show Host (2011–2017)
- Best Structured Reality Show (since 2015)
- Best Supporting Actor in a Comedy Series (since 2011)
- Best Supporting Actor in a Drama Series (since 2011)
- Best Supporting Actor in a Movie/Miniseries (since 2013)
- Best Supporting Actress in a Comedy Series (since 2011)
- Best Supporting Actress in a Drama Series (since 2011)
- Best Supporting Actress in a Movie/Miniseries (since 2013)
- Best Talk Show (since 2011)
- Best Unstructured Reality Show (since 2015)
- Most Exciting New Series (2011–2016)

== Criticism ==
Following the announcement of the partnership with Entertainment Weekly prior to the 7th Critics Choice Television Awards in November 2016, several high profile members of the Broadcast Television Journalists Association left the organization, including Michael Ausiello of TVLine, Maureen Ryan of Variety, Ken Tucker of Yahoo! TV, and Michael Schneider of IndieWire. In an article Schneider published shortly after his resignation titled, he wrote: "The idea that Entertainment Weekly would be the preferred media outlet for an awards show decided by journalists from many outlets is unusual. (It would be like CNN being named the official partner of the Presidential Debates, even though they're moderated and covered by representatives from multiple news organizations.)" Following the mass exodus of television critics, the Broadcast Television Journalists Association lost 15%–30% of its membership. This caused the majority of the membership to be made up of internet journalists instead of television critics. During the 7th Critics Choice Television Awards the fact that several critically acclaimed shows were snubbed such as The Americans, Rectify, The Night Of and You're the Worst in favor of shows with very little to no critical support such as Modern Family, The Big Bang Theory, and House of Cards was credited, and widely criticized, due to this change.

== Award ceremonies ==
#	Date	Venue	Host	Network
1st	June 20, 2011	The Beverly Hilton, Beverly Hills	Cat Deeley	ReelzChannel
2nd	June 18, 2012	The Beverly Hilton, Beverly Hills	—N/a	—N/a
3rd	June 10, 2013	The Beverly Hilton, Beverly Hills	Retta	Ustream
4th	June 19, 2014	The Beverly Hilton, Beverly Hills	Cedric the Entertainer	The CW
5th	May 31, 2015	The Beverly Hilton, Beverly Hills	Cat Deeley	A&E

== Superlatives ==
=== Multiple winners ===
6 awards

- Jean Smart

3 awards

- Allison Janney
- Bob Odenkirk
- Sarah Paulson
- Sarah Snook

2 awards

- Uzo Aduba
- Tom Bergeron
- Alex Borstein
- Rachel Brosnahan
- Mayim Bialik
- Andre Braugher
- Sterling K. Brown
- Louis C.K.
- Jennifer Coolidge
- Bryan Cranston
- Billy Crudup
- Kieran Culkin
- Julia Louis-Dreyfus
- Giancarlo Esposito
- Bill Hader
- Christina Hendricks
- Regina King
- Margo Martindale
- Tatiana Maslany
- Thandiwe Newton
- Jim Parsons
- Jason Sudeikis
- Jeffrey Tambor
- Hannah Waddingham
- Henry Winkler

=== Multiple nominees ===
10 nominations

- Christine Baranski

8 nominations

- Walton Goggins
- Allison Janney
- Keri Russell

7 nominations

- Sterling K. Brown
- Matthew Rhys
- Jean Smart

6 nominations

- Betty Gilpin
- Regina King
- Jessica Lange
- Elisabeth Moss
- Bob Odenkirk

5 nominations

- Tom Bergeron
- Ellen Burstyn
- Carrie Coon
- Cat Deeley
- Julia Garner
- Freddie Highmore
- Bill Hader
- Julianna Margulies
- Timothy Olyphant
- Jim Parsons
- Eden Sher

4 nominations

- Anthony Anderson
- Kathy Bates
- Mayim Bialik
- Andre Braugher
- Louis C.K.
- Bryan Cranston
- Kaley Cuoco
- Claire Danes
- Julia Louis-Dreyfus
- Margo Martindale
- Tatiana Maslany
- Sarah Paulson
- Amy Poehler
- RuPaul
- Adam Scott
- Rhea Seehorn
- Sarah Snook
- Henry Winkler
- Robin Wright

3 nominations

- Uzo Aduba
- Gillian Anderson
- Aziz Ansari
- Christina Applegate
- Alison Brie
- Jonathan Banks
- Alex Borstein
- Rachel Brosnahan
- Emilia Clarke
- Olivia Colman
- Billy Crudup
- Benedict Cumberbatch
- Viola Davis
- Kaitlyn Dever
- Peter Dinklage
- Vera Farmiga
- Anna Gunn
- Melanie Lynskey
- Matthew Macfadyen
- Thomas Middleditch
- Audra McDonald
- Nick Offerman
- Martha Plimpton
- Danny Pudi
- Issa Rae
- RuPaul
- Julia Roberts
- John Slattery
- Jeremy Strong
- Jeremy Allen White
- Constance Wu

2 nominations

- Ted Allen
- Caitriona Balfe
- Julie Bowen
- Tituss Burgess
- Ty Burrell
- Jaime Camil
- Bobby Cannavale
- Helena Bonham-Carter
- Don Cheadle
- Jodie Comer
- Jennifer Coolidge
- Kieran Culkin
- Hugh Dancy
- Zooey Deschanel
- Ann Dowd
- Lena Dunham
- Kirsten Dunst
- Christopher Eccleston
- Idris Elba
- Giancarlo Esposito
- Will Forte
- Sutton Foster
- Claire Foy
- Martin Freeman
- Eva Green
- Max Greenfield
- Tony Hale
- Jon Hamm
- Christina Hendricks
- Taraji P. Henson
- Tom Hiddleston
- Charlie Hunnam
- Jane Krakowski
- Dan Levy
- Eugene Levy
- Damian Lewis
- Jenifer Lewis
- Judith Light
- Laura Linney
- Rami Malek
- Kelly Macdonald
- Matthew Macfadyen
- Joel McHale
- Wendi McLendon-Covey
- Janet McTeer
- Annie Murphy
- Thandiwe Newton
- John Noble
- Sandra Oh
- Catherine O'Hara
- Ed O'Neill
- Randall Park
- Aaron Paul
- Evan Peters
- Diana Rigg
- Gina Rodriguez
- Emmy Rossum
- Katey Sagal
- Amy Schumer
- Ryan Seacrest
- Maggie Siff
- Jason Sudeikis
- Jeffrey Tambor
- Cicely Tyson
- Hannah Waddingham
- Dominic West
- Casey Wilson
- Patrick Wilson
- Aden Young
- Constance Zimmer

== See also ==
- List of American television awards
