= Knife and Fork Inn =

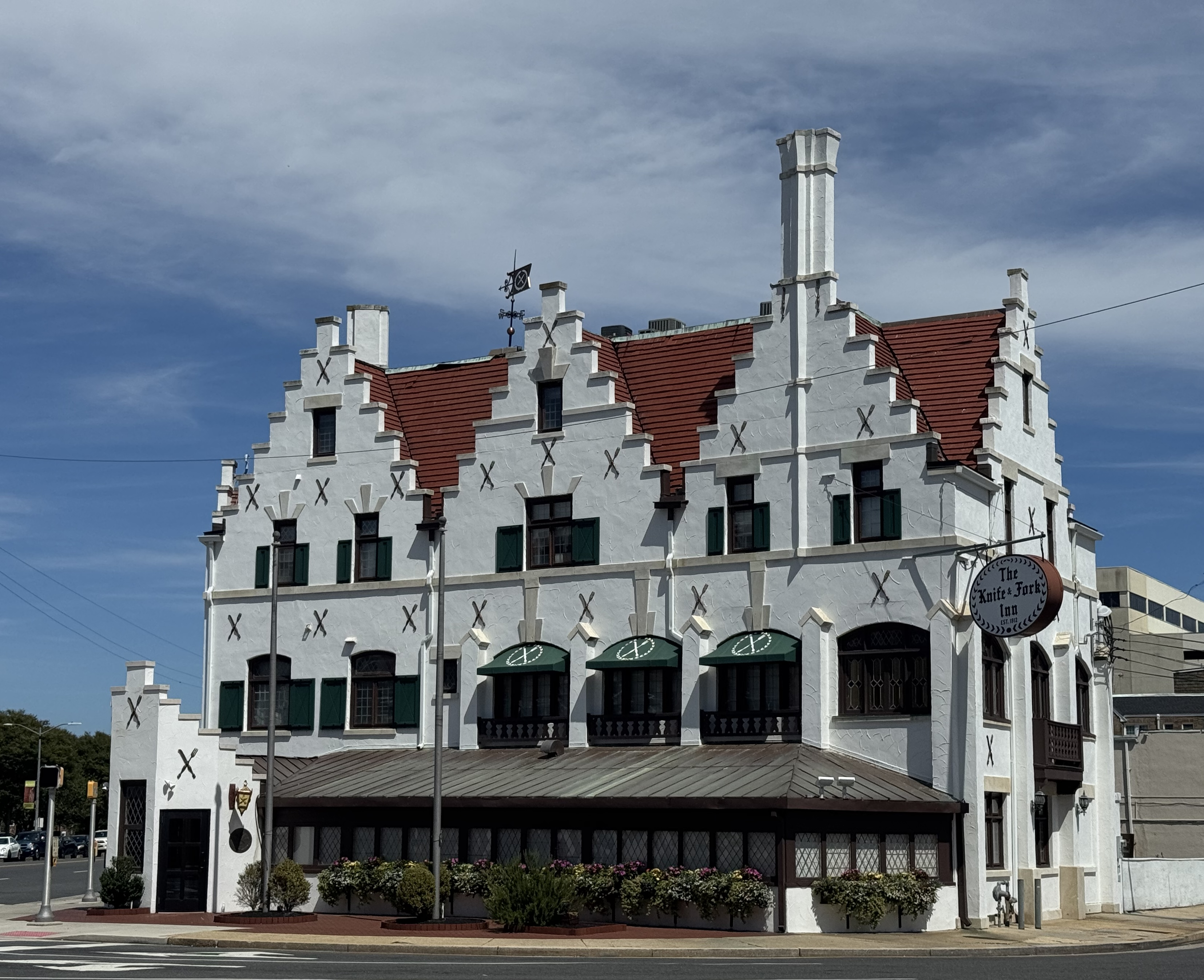
- Interactive map of Knife and Fork Inn

Restaurant information
- Location: 3600 Atlantic Avenue, Atlantic City, New Jersey, 08401
- Coordinates: 39.35011°N 74.45346°W

The Knife and Fork Inn is a restaurant located at the confluence of Atlantic and Pacific Avenues in Atlantic City, New Jersey which was first opened in 1912 as a private club by "the Commodore" Louis Kuehnle and then in 1927 "on the eve of Prohibition" became an exclusive dining room catering to the municipalities' upper echelons founded by the New York City hotelier Milton Latz.

The "porch scene" with Burt Lancaster and Susan Sarandon from the 1980 movie "Atlantic City" was shot on the section of the restaurant now known as the Terrace.

The restaurant was shut by Milton Latz's son Mack Latz in December 1996. Then in turn in December 1999 the second Latz's son Andrew decided to run it for his father and the dining establishment was reopened. Then after court battles the elder Latz (over the boisterous objections of the younger Latz) sold the establishment to its current owners the Dougherty family, the longtime proprietors of Dock's Oyster House on Atlantic avenue in Atlantic City (the oldest restaurant in the seaside resort first opened in 1897).

Among the celebrities and power brokers who wined and dined there during its original run were entertainers such as Rosemary Clooney, Vic Damone and Bob Hope, as well as the casino mogul Steve Wynn and two former Governors of New Jersey, James Florio and Christine Todd Whitman. However it would be one specific mover and shaker later to be fictionalized in the HBO megahit series Boardwalk Empire, the Atlantic City power boss and racketeer, Enoch "Nucky" Johnson who would hold forth in an era in which then when portrayed would bring the Knife and Fork Inn newfound fame.

Although Babette's Supper Club was not around in the earliest days of Prohibition as depicted in the aforementioned series, the Knife & Fork would have been the closest establishment to mirror the scenes which take place in Babette's on the show at that time and indeed it was chosen to portray the other legendary long gone establishment in the series. In a later season of Boardwalk Empire, the Knife & Fork itself was mentioned and a facsimile was recreated for a major scene in the show.

Gallery of postcards

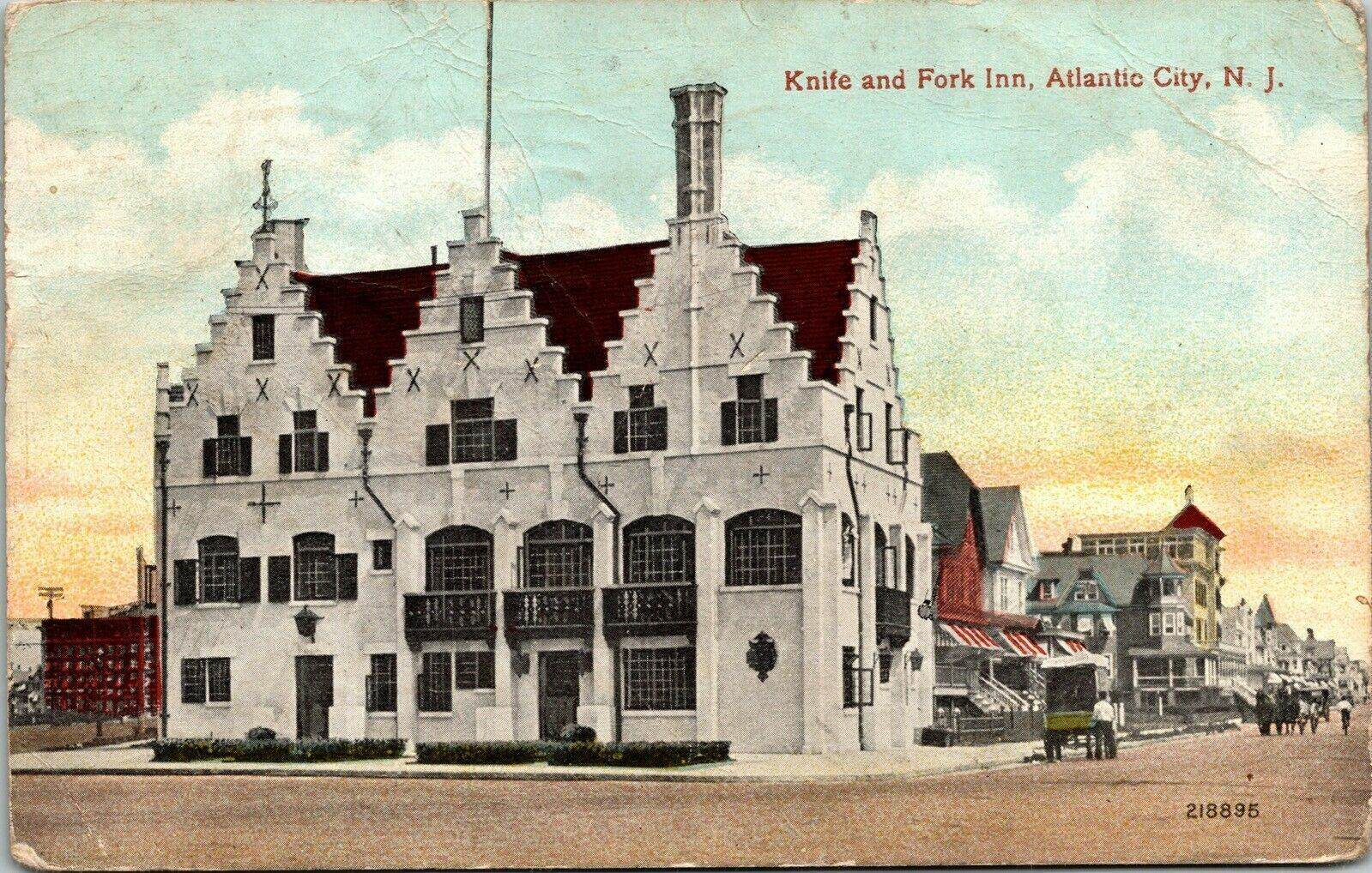
Postcard showing Knife and Fork Inn, circa 1915

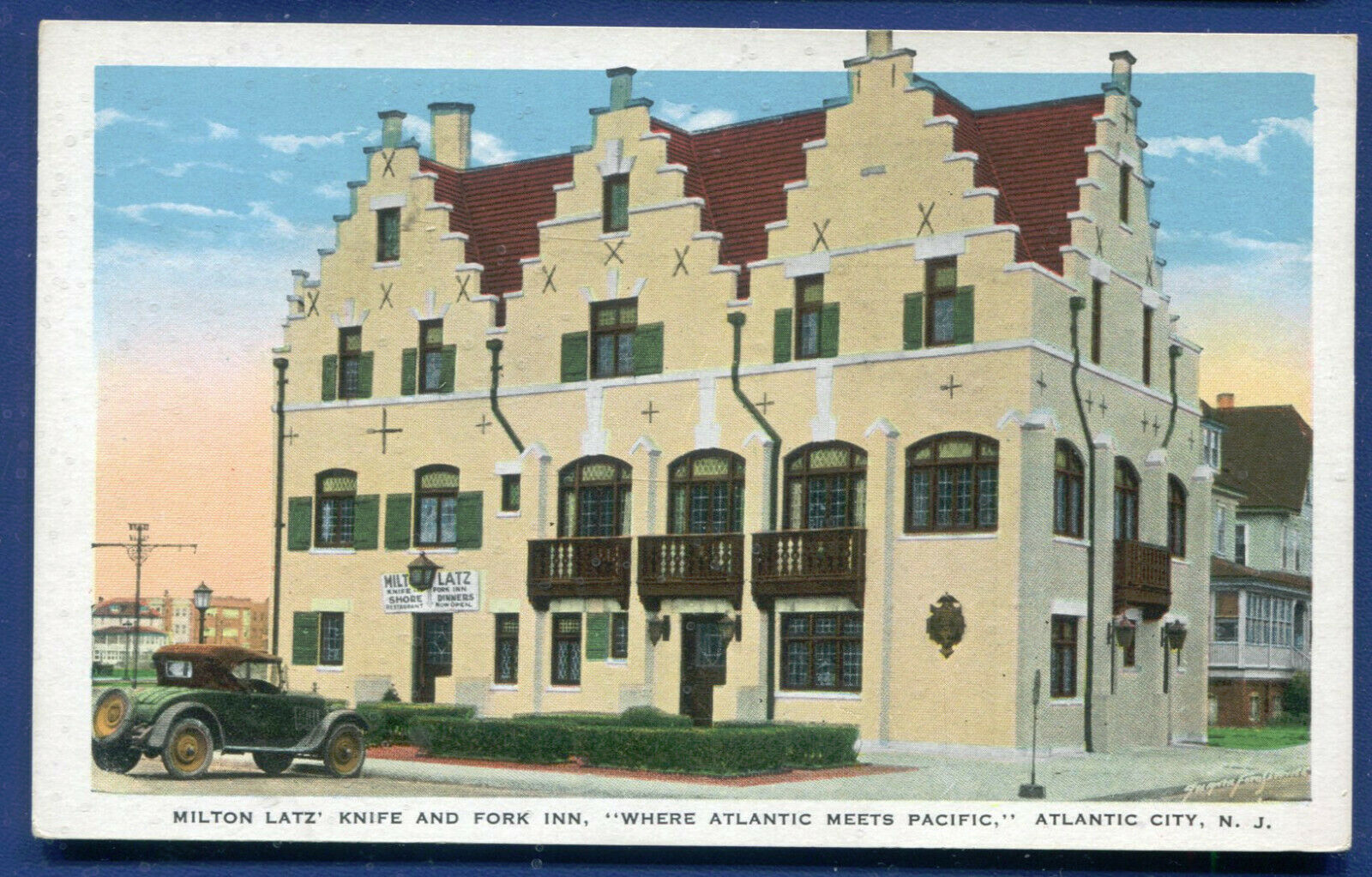
Postcard showing Knife and Fork Inn, circa 1930

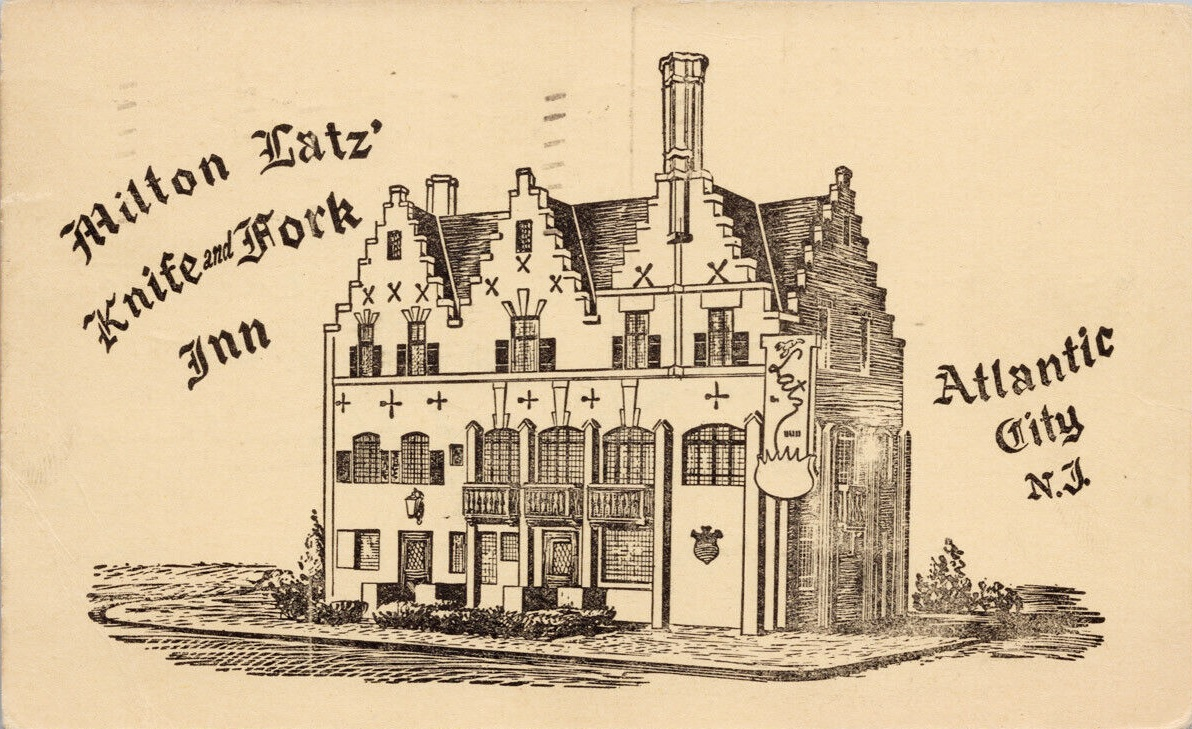
Freebie postcard, circa 1948

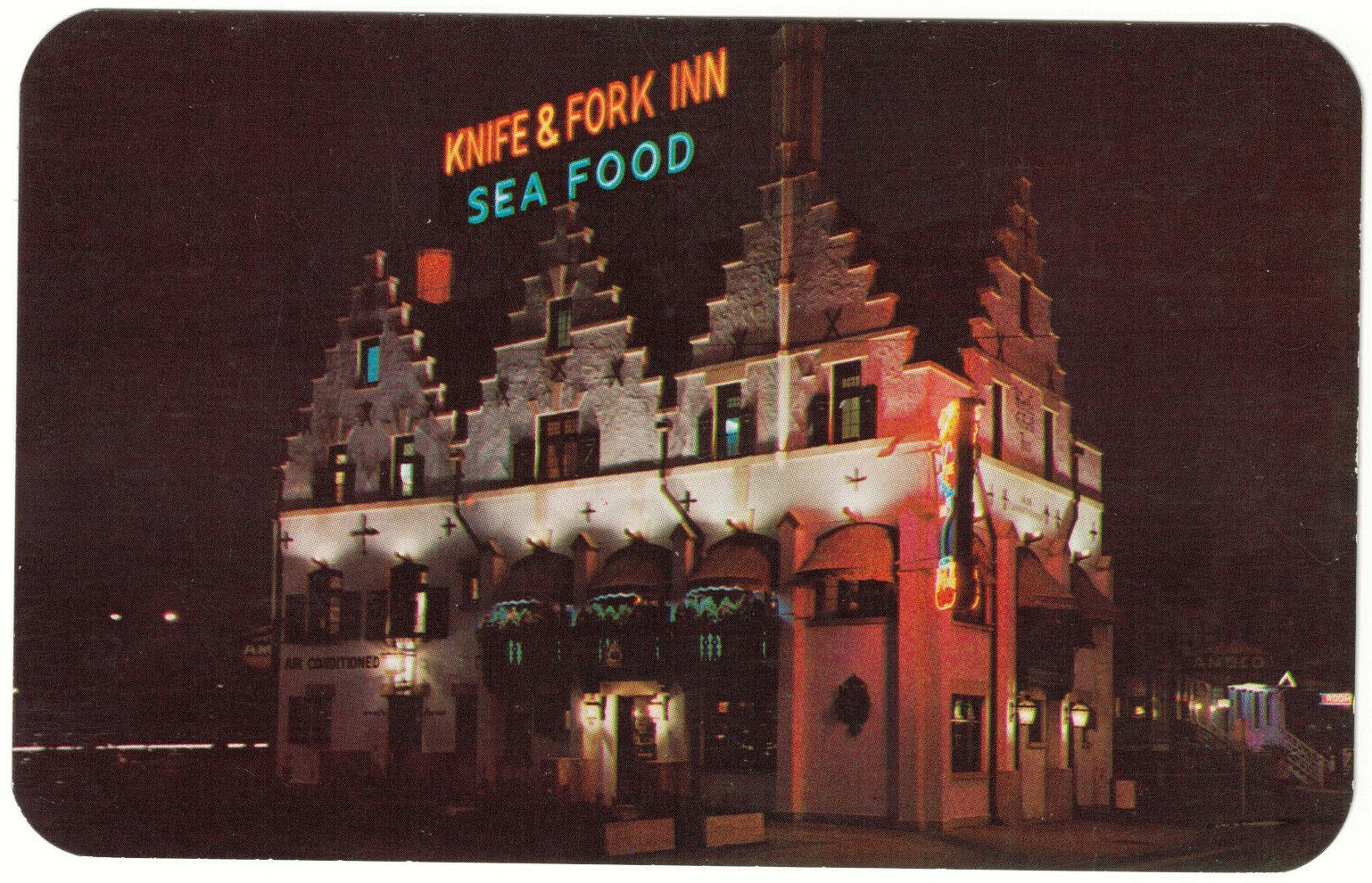
Postcard showing Knife and Fork Inn, circa 1975
