= Cơm hến =

Traditional dish from Huế, Vietnam

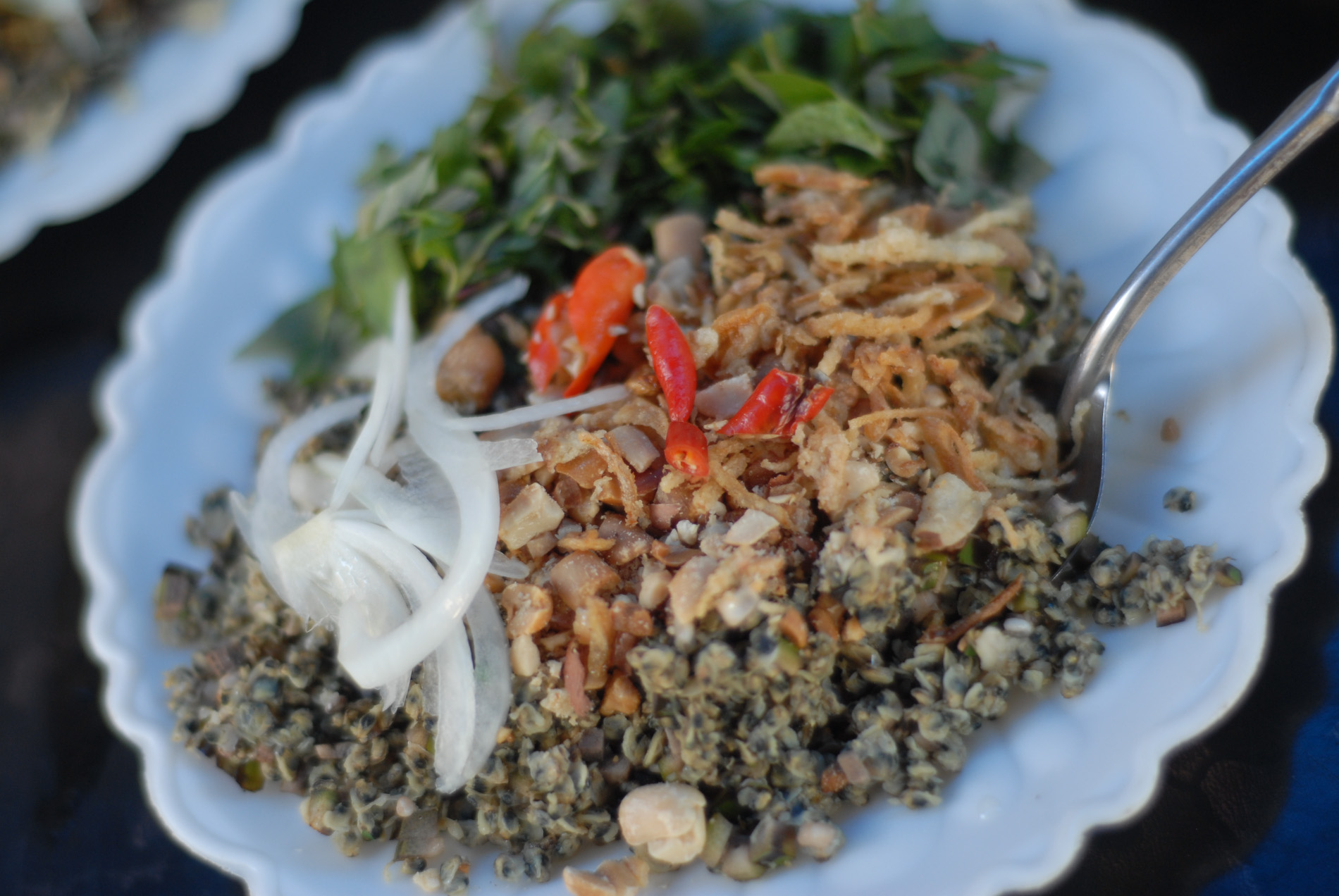
A plate of cơm hến

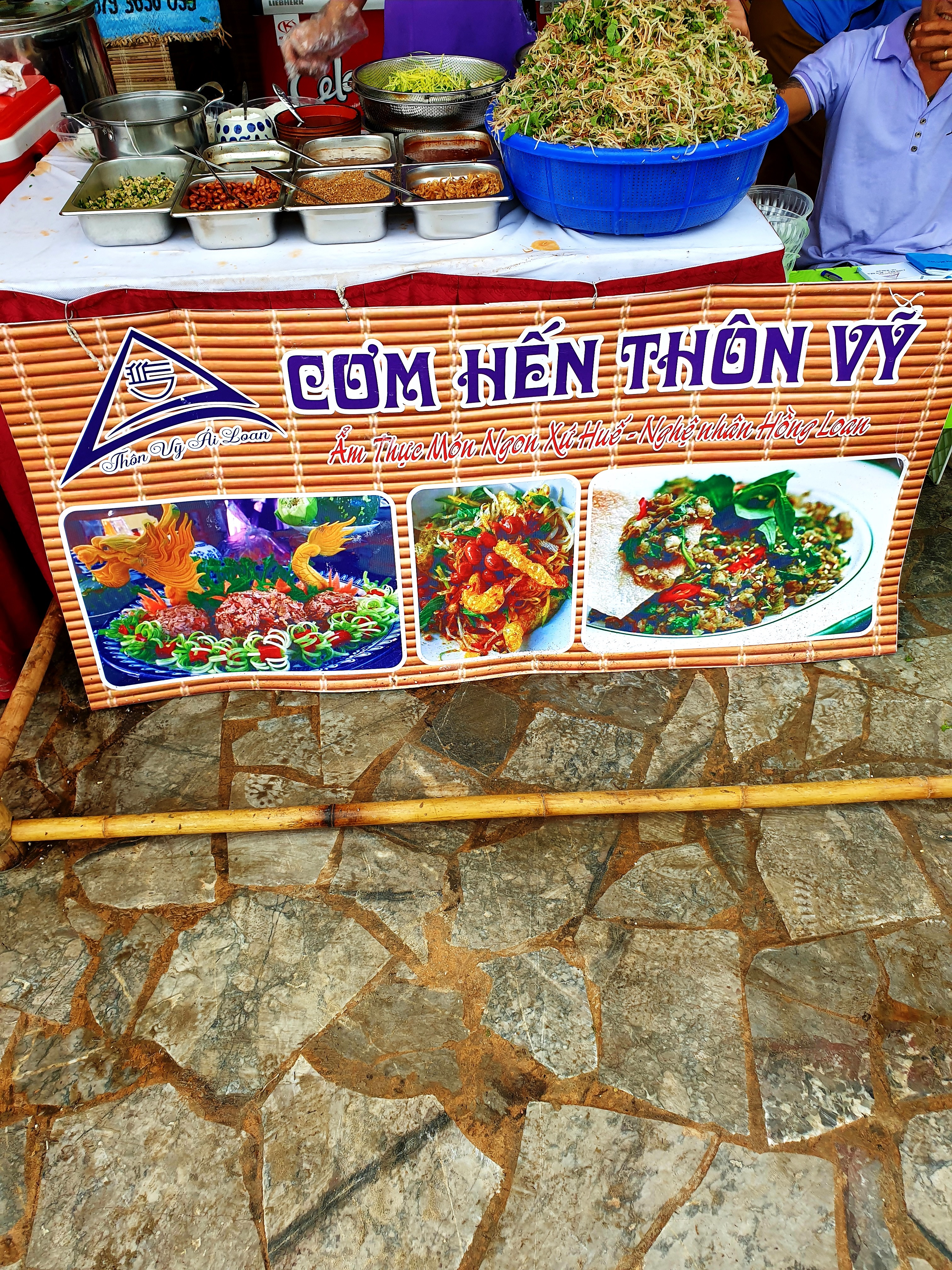
Ingredients for making Cơm hến at a food stall

Cơm hến (baby basket clams rice) is a Vietnamese rice dish originating in Huế. It consists of cooked baby river mussels (basket clams), rice, peanuts, pork rinds, shrimp paste, chili paste, starfruit and bạc hà stems, and is normally served with the broth of cooked mussels at room temperature.
