= John Criscitello =

John Criscitello (born 1967 Binghamton, New York) is a multimedia video artist currently residing in Seattle, Washington. Criscitello studied visual art at the Munson-Williams-Proctor Arts Institute in Utica, New York. He has exhibited his work internationally in both solo and group exhibitions. He is also the founding director of a non-profit contemporary art space in Ithaca, New York, that does quarterly screening of videos and short films called "Video/Art/Ithaca".
