= Dock's Oyster House =

Coordinates: 39°21′25.5″N 74°26′27.5″W

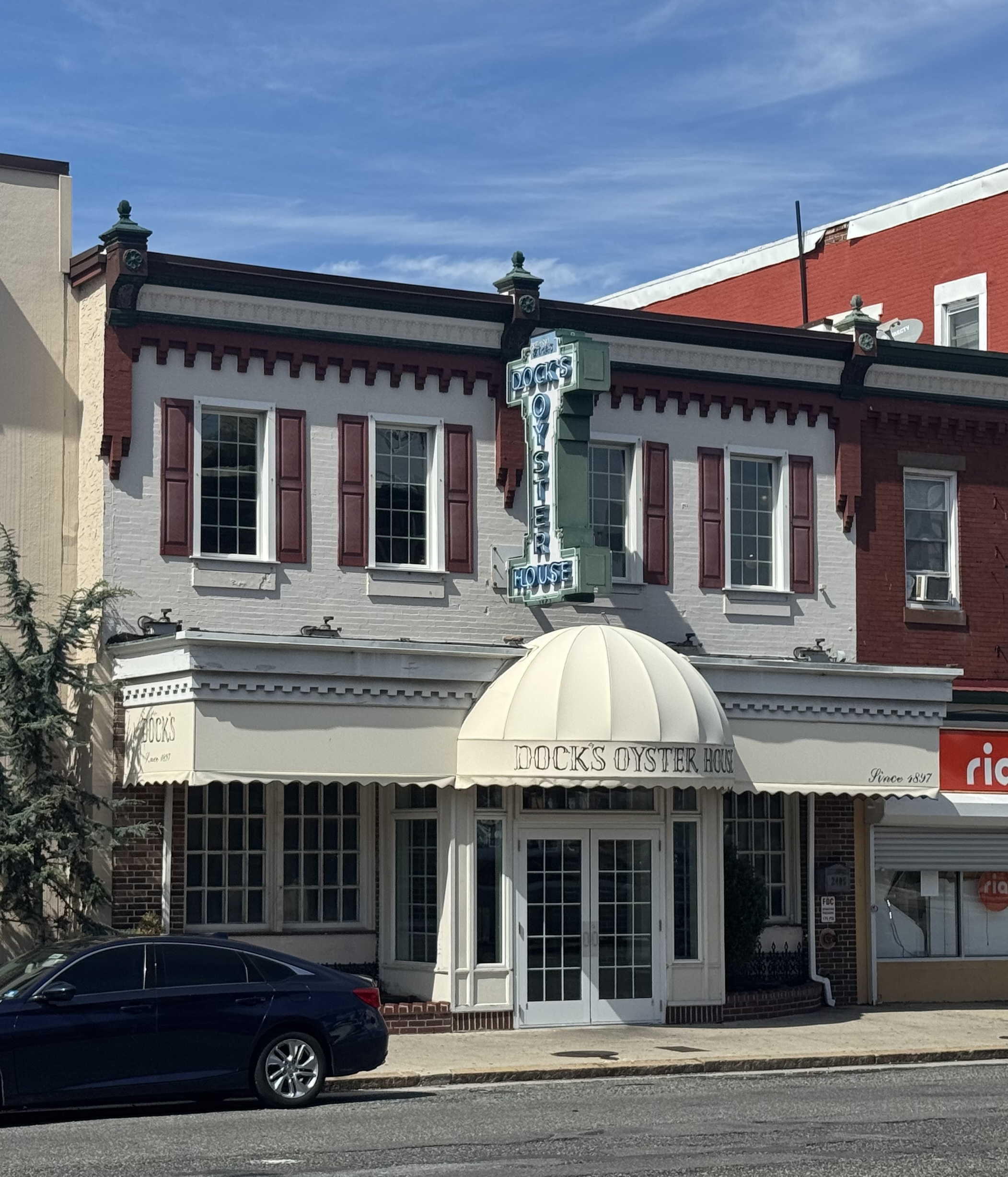
- Interactive map of Dock's Oyster House

Restaurant information
- Established: 1897
- Location: Atlantic City, New Jersey, United States
- Seating capacity: 60
- Website: www.docksoysterhouse.com

Dock's Oyster House is a restaurant and bar located in Atlantic City, New Jersey. It was opened in 1897 by Harry "call me Dock" Dougherty, who believed that the city needed a clean place to serve fresh seafood. They had no liquor license and only 60 seats. One hundred and twenty years later, they have expanded the seating and have a liquor license. It is family-owned.

Dock's is on the Anthony Bourdain Food Trail.

== In popular culture ==
They appeared on season 5 of Anthony Bourdain: Parts Unknown.
