= Đông Ba Market =

- Chợ Đông Ba
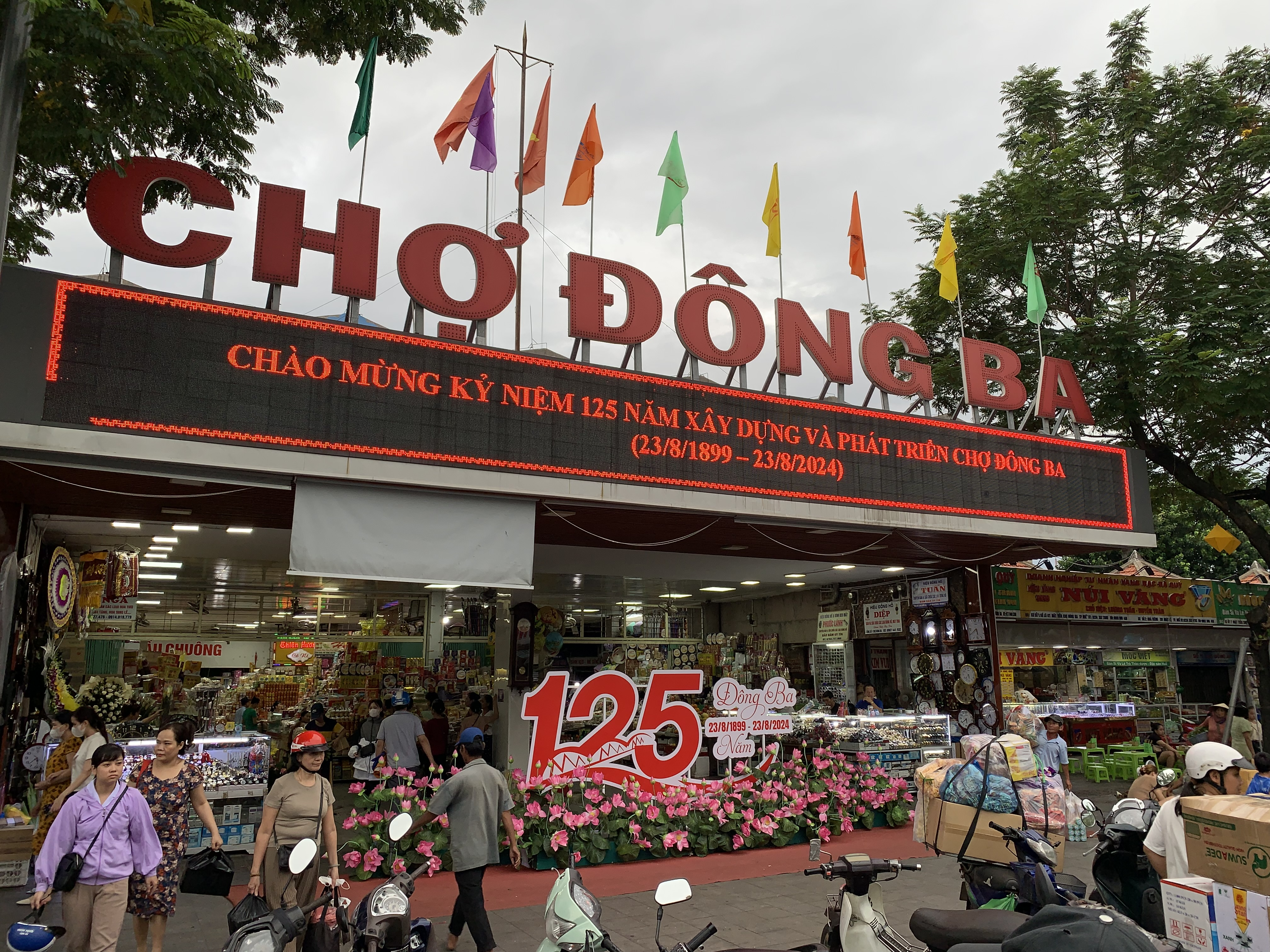
- Main entrance to the Đông Ba Market as of 2024
- Interactive map of the Đông Ba Market area

General information
- Status: In use
- Type: Traditional market
- Location: Trần Hưng Đạo Road, Huế, Thừa Thiên Huế province, Vietnam
- Coordinates: 16°28′21″N 107°35′19″E
- Inaugurated: 1899; 127 years ago

Đông Ba Market (Vietnamese: Chợ Đông Ba) is a traditional market in Huế, Vietnam. With a history of more than a hundred years, the market became a landmark of the former capital city of Vietnam.

== Location ==
Đông Ba Market is located on the Perfume River's north bank, near the southeast corner of the citadel. It has a total area of 47,614 square metres (512,510 sq ft).

== History ==
According to Đại Nam nhất thống chí, under the reign of Emperor Gia Long, the market was located right outside of the Eastern Gate of the citadel. A roofed house called đình Quy Giả was built at the center of the market so the market itself was also known as "Quy Giả market". In 1885, the market was completely burnt down in the Battle of the Huế Imperial City. It was not until 1887 did Emperor Đồng Khánh have the market rebuilt.

In 1899, as part of Huế city's urban planning, Emperor Thành Thái ordered the reconstruction of the market at its current location, then situated on Truong Tien Road. The new market had 48 roofed stalls. A well was also built inside the market for water supply. The site of the old market outside of the Eastern Gate was later occupied by a Franco-Vietnamese school, which Nguyễn Tất Thành used to attend.

In 1967, Đông Ba Market was demolished and rebuilt. However, the incomplete construction site was targeted in the Tet Offensive. Temporary renovations have been done afterward to keep the market operating. A major renovation of the market did not take place until 1987.

== Commerce ==
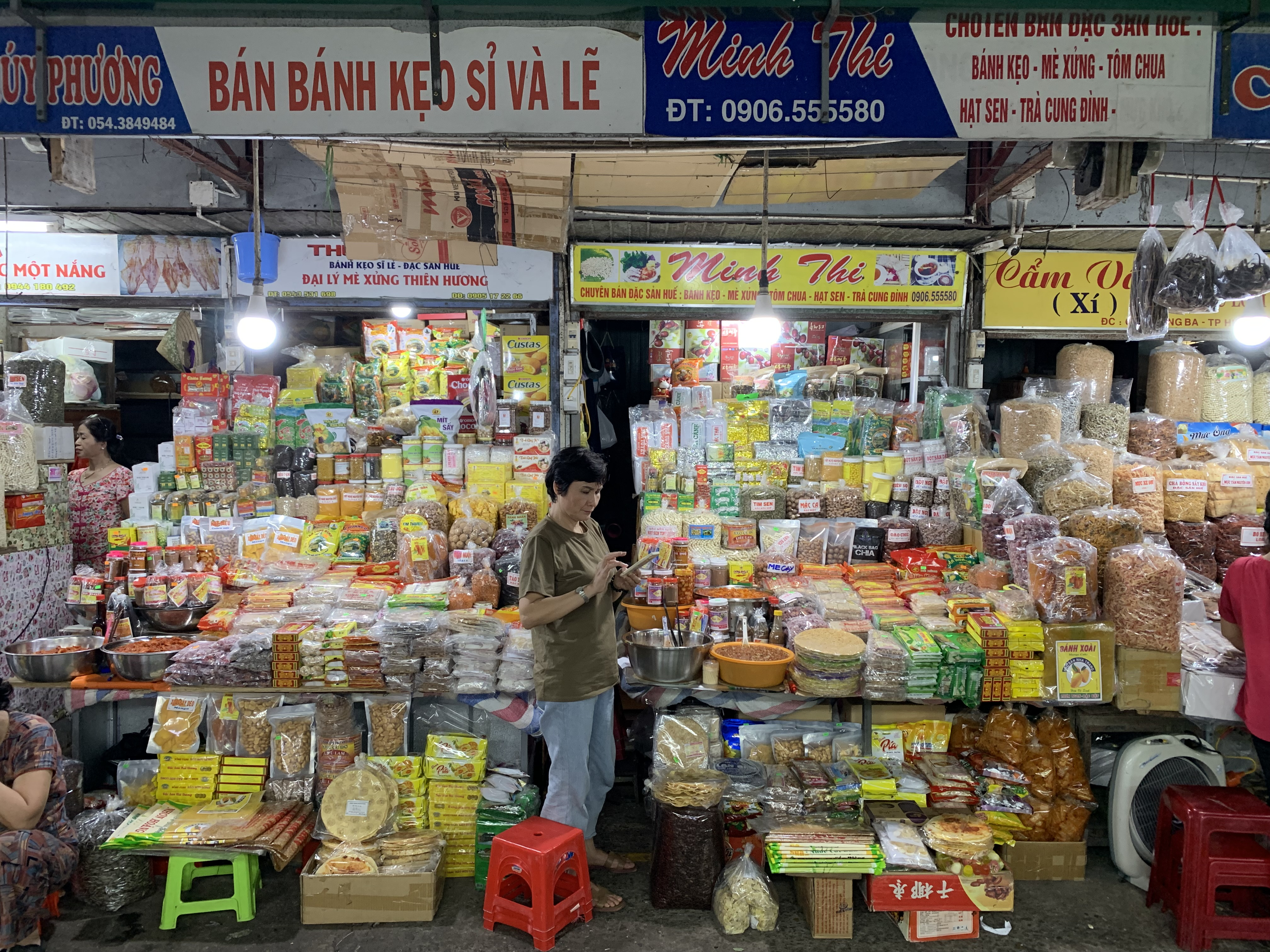
Various goods sold in the Đông Ba Market in 2024)

Đông Ba Market is a popular local market and is, therefore, usually crowded. It sells a variety of goods, from fresh produce and fish to clothing, toys, shoes, and handicrafts. The market is busiest in the early morning, even though it is open all day.
