= Kevin Sousa (chef) =

American chef

- Born: November 21, 1974 (age 51); McKees Rocks, Pennsylvania
- Culinary career
- Cooking style: New American
- Website: https://kevindeansousa.com/

Kevin Sousa was a professional private chef and consultant. He was previously the executive chef and co-owner of Superior Motors, an American restaurant which opened in July 2017 in Pittsburgh, Pennsylvania. He was previously the chef/co-owner of Salt of the Earth, Union Pig & Chicken and Station Street Food.

== Career ==
Sousa was born November 21, 1974, in McKees Rocks, Pennsylvania. Sousa worked at the Duquesne Club as senior saucier and roundsperson under chef Keith Coughenaur, later gaining recognition during his time at Big Burrito Restaurant Group at Kaya and Soba, Bigelow Grille and Alchemy, the Red Room Cafe, and as a consulting chef for Nine on Nine before undertaking his own venture, Salt of the Earth. Sousa also has a consulting company, naclpgh, which specializes in concept redevelopment and implementation, notable projects include Yo Rita Taqueria. In early 2012, Sousa and team opened Union Pig and Chicken as well as Station Street Hot Dogs in the East Liberty neighborhood of Pittsburgh.

Sousa was voted a Rising Star Chef in 2004 by the Pittsburgh Magazine. Salt was semi-finalist for the "Best New Restaurant" category for the James Beard Award in 2011. In December 2010, Sousa's Salt of the Earth was favorably reviewed by the national publication "The Week" along with restaurants in Los Angeles and Dallas. Sousa was named 2011 Chef of the Year by Pittsburgh Magazine. Salt of the Earth was recognized in Food & Wine Magazine as having one of the "Ten Best Restaurant Dishes of 2011," and by The New York Times as being an integral part of Pittsburgh's farm-to-table movement. Sousa was named a semifinalist for Food & Wine magazine's "The People's Best New Chef" 2012. Sousa was a semi-finalist for "Best Chef: Midatlantic" for the James Beard Award in 2012.

In December 2013, Sousa launched a Kickstarter campaign to gather funding for an upcoming restaurant named Superior Motors in Braddock, Pennsylvania. With a backing of 2,026 backers, Sousa raised $310,225 for his New American style restaurant concept.

In July 2017, after years of delays, Superior Motors finally opened to the public. Within its first year, it was named one of the Top 10 best restaurants in the country by Food and Wine Magazine, and the best new restaurant of 2018 by Pittsburgh Magazine.

Superior Motors closed in 2020 due to the COVID-19 pandemic, and Sousa is no longer involved in operations. Superior Motors' owners have not yet announced plans to reopen the restaurant.

In October 2021, Sousa opened Mount Oliver Bodega (M.O.B.), a new restaurant in Mount Oliver, owned by the real estate company RE360. On December 2, 2021 his wife Meg Sousa announced in a statement that the couple were stepping away from the restaurant.
