= The Moment (American TV series) =

American television series

- Genre: Reality
- Presented by: Kurt Warner
- Country of origin: United States
- Original language: English
- No. of seasons: 1
- No. of episodes: 9

Production
- Executive producers: Charlie Ebersol; Justin Hochberg
- Running time: 45 minutes
- Production company: The Hochberg Ebersol Company

Original release
- Network: USA
- Release: April 11 – May 31, 2013

The Moment is an American reality television series that debuted on USA Network on April 11, 2013, and last aired on May 31, 2013. Casting for a potential second season took place prior to the series debut. The series debuted with 1.129 million viewers, with the second episode dropping to 963,000 viewers and its third airing capturing only 950,000 viewers — which led to USA shifting the series to Fridays at 11 pm.

== Premise ==
The Moment chronicles the lives of nine men and women who are nominated by a close friend or family member and surprised by Kurt Warner who gives them the chance to reclaim the career dreams they put on hold when their lives took an unexpected turn. They will endure extensive training by an expert mentor who will prepare them for an audition of the career they've chosen. In the end, they are left with the decision to accept their new job and change their lives forever or keep the career they currently hold and go back to their normal life.

== Episodes ==
No.	Title	Original release date
1	"America's Cup Sailor"	February 20, 2013
Note: This episode aired as sneak preview.
2	"Sports Illustrated Photographer"	April 11, 2013
3	"NASCAR Driver"	April 18, 2013
4	"White House Chef"	April 25, 2013
5	"Notre Dame Football Coach"	May 3, 2013
Note: This is the first episode to air in the series' new time slot.
6	"Toy Designer"	May 10, 2013
7	"Choreographer"	May 17, 2013
8	"Broadway Costume Designer"	May 24, 2013
9	"Cincinnati Pops Conductor"	May 31, 2013
