= Wild Things with Dominic Monaghan =

Wildlife documentary TV series

- Genre: reality, documentary
- Developed by: Jenn Kuzmyk Ruch and Dominic Monaghan
- Presented by: Dominic Monaghan
- No. of series: 3
- No. of episodes: 28

Production
- Executive producers: Dominic Monaghan; Dave Brady
- Cinematography: Frank Vilaca
- Running time: 60 minutes

Original release
- Network: BBC America (series 1 - 2); Channel 5 (series 1); Travel Channel (series 3)
- Release: 22 January 2013 – present

Wild Things with Dominic Monaghan is a wildlife documentary series commissioned by Channel 5 and BBC America and presented by actor Dominic Monaghan, who also serves as an executive producer for the show. Each hour-long episode follows Monaghan, an avid outdoorsman, as he travels to a new exotic location in search of "some of the most dangerous and elusive creatures known to man." The show's eight-episode first series premiered in the UK on 9 November 2012 and in the U.S. on 22 January 2013, and was nominated for Best Reality Series at the 3rd Annual Critics' Choice Television Awards. In June 2013, Wild Things with Dominic Monaghan was renewed for a second series, which premiered in the U.S. on 25 March 2014 on BBC America. After Channel 5 elected not to acquire the second season, BBC Worldwide acquired the international rights to the show. In the U.S., the third season aired on the Travel Channel instead of BBC America. It originally aired in prime time on Wednesdays, but later moved to Saturday mornings.

The show was nominated for the Outstanding Unstructured Reality Program at the 66th Primetime Creative Arts Emmy Awards.

== Episode list ==
=== Series 1 (2013) ===
No. in series	Title	Location	Original release date
1	"Giant Water Bug"	Vietnam	22 January 2013
2	"Giant Huntsman Spider"	Laos	29 January 2013
3	"Black Hairy Thick Tail Scorpion"	Namibia	5 February 2013
4	"Giant Centipede"	Venezuela	12 February 2013
5	"White Goliath Beetle"	Cameroon	19 February 2013
6	"Army Ants"	Ecuador	26 February 2013
7	"Giant Malaysian Honey Bees"	Malaysia	5 March 2013
8	"Guatemalan Beaded Lizard"	Guatemala	12 March 2013

=== Series 2 (2014) ===
No. in series	Title	Location	Original release date
1	"Giant Spitting Cobra"	Kenya	25 March 2014
2	"Ghost Bat"	Australia	1 April 2014
3	"Lemur Leaf Frog"	Costa Rica	8 April 2014
4	"Gaboon Viper"	Zambia	15 April 2014
5	"The Titan Beetle"	Brazil	22 April 2014
6	"Box Jellyfish"	Australia	29 April 2014
7	"The Giant Wetapunga"	New Zealand	6 May 2014
8	"The Gila Monster"	Arizona	13 May 2014
9	"Giant Salamander"	Japan	20 May 2014
10	"The Slow Loris"	Thailand	27 May 2014

=== Series 3 (2016) ===
No. in series	Title	Location	Original release date
1	"Fer-de-Lance"	Belize	5 January 2016
2	"Sharks"	Florida	12 January 2016
3	"Aye Aye"	Madagascar	19 January 2016
4	"Whale Shark"	Mozambique	26 January 2016
5	"White Lion"	South Africa	2 February 2016
6	"Indian Cobra"	Sri Lanka	9 February 2016
7	"Flying Lizard"	Philippines	16 February 2016
8	"Electric Eel"	Peruvian Amazon	23 February 2016
9	"Lake Titicaca Water Frog"	Peru	1 March 2016
10	"Giant Anteater"	Brazil	8 March 2016
11	"Andean Bear"	Bolivia	15 March 2016
12	"Coconut Crab"	Palau	22 March 2016
