= Undercover Boss =

Reality television series

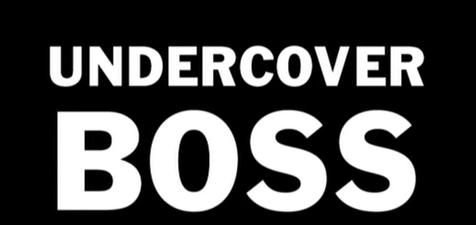
- Created by: Stephen Lambert
- Original work: Undercover Boss (United Kingdom)
- Years: 2009–present

Films and television
- Television series: Undercover Boss (see franchises)

Miscellaneous
- Genre: Reality television
- First aired: 15 June 2009; 17 years ago
- Distributor: Banijay Entertainment

Official website
- Production website

Undercover Boss is a reality television series franchise created by Stephen Lambert and produced in many countries. It originated in 2009 on the British Channel 4. The show's format features the experiences of senior executives working undercover in their own companies to investigate how their firms really work and to identify how they can be improved, as well as to reward hard-working employees.

== Format ==
Each episode features a high-ranking executive or the owner of a corporation going undercover as an entry-level employee in his or her own company. The executives alter their appearance and assume an alias and fictional back-story. The fictitious explanation given for the accompanying camera crew is that the executives are being filmed as part of a documentary about entry-level workers in a particular industry, or a competition with another individual with the winner getting a job with the company. They spend approximately one to two weeks undercover (one week being the norm in some editions, such as the US version, and two weeks in some other versions, such as the Australian edition), working in various areas of their company's operations, with different parts and in most cases a different location each day. They are exposed to a series of predicaments with amusing results, and invariably spend time getting to know the people who work in the company, learning about their professional and personal challenges.

At the end of their time undercover, the executives return to their true identity and request the employees they worked with individually to travel to a central location—often corporate headquarters. The bosses reveal their identity, and reward hard-working employees through promotion, or financial rewards, while other employees are given training, better working conditions, or, in extreme cases, termination.

== Franchises ==
=== Australia ===
The Australian version of the franchise premiered on Network Ten on 18 October 2010 The show ran for 2 seasons.

=== Austria ===
The Austrian version of Undercover Boss premiered on ORF eins on 16 January 2013 with the CEO of ASFiNAG, Klaus Schierhackl.

=== Bulgaria ===
The Bulgarian version of Undercover Boss is named Шеф под прикритие (Shef pod prikritie). Premier of the show is on 9 February 2016 on Nova TV. The first show is for Domino's Pizza Bulgaria.

=== Brazil ===
The Brazilian version of Undercover Boss is named Chefe Secreto. Premier of the show was on 27 September 2015 as an part of Fantástico newsmagazine on Rede Globo. The first show is for Adezan, a company which produces industrial packings, with his managing manager Pedro Stivalli

=== Canada ===
The Canadian version of Undercover Boss premiered on W Network on 2 February 2012 with the CEO of Toronto Zoo, John Tracogna.

=== Chile ===
The Chilean version of Undercover Boss, named El jefe en tus zapatos ("The Boss in your shoes"), premiered on Chilevisión on 17 August 2016 with the CEO of Monarch, Alejandro Magnasco.

=== Colombia ===
The Colombian version of Undercover Boss, named Jefe encubierto, launched on RCN Televisión on 3 December 2017.

=== Czech Republic ===
The Czech version of Undercover Boss, named Utajený šéf, premiered on TV Nova on 25 April 2018. Six episodes were aired.

=== France ===
Patron incognito is broadcast on M6.

=== Germany ===
The German version of Undercover Boss premiered on RTL on 28 March 2011 with the CEO of Eismann, Mika Ramm.

=== Hungary ===
The Hungarian version of Undercover Boss, named Főnök inkognitóban, premiered on RTL Klub on 29 April 2019. Six episodes were aired.

=== Israel ===
Undercover Boss Israel, premiered in January 2013 and has aired 15 episodes over 2 seasons.

=== Italy ===
The Italian version of Undercover Boss is Boss in incognito. The show premiered in January 2014. It is broadcast on Rai 2 and has had so far ten seasons. TV channel NOVE of Discovery Networks broadcasts the UK and US versions.

=== Japan ===
The Japanese version of Undercover Boss is named Fukumen Research Boss Sennyū. The show premiered on 28 March 2015. It is broadcast on NHK BS Premium and has had so far three seasons.

=== Norway ===
The Norwegian version of Undercover Boss premiered on TV2 on 8 March 2011 with the CEO of Rimi, Thor Linge. Ten episodes are scheduled.

=== Poland ===
The Polish version of Undercover Boss is Kryptonim szef. The show premiered on 2 September 2015 at broadcaster TVP1. Ten episodes are scheduled.

=== Romania ===
The Romanian version of Undercover Boss is Șef sub acoperire. The show premiered on 12 September 2019 on Pro TV and has had 5 seasons.

=== Russia ===
The Russian version of Undercover Boss is Трудно быть боссом (Hard to be Boss). The show premiered on 13 May 2018 on NTV. This format is the only that has the on-screen host - Lisa Gamburg.

=== Spain ===
The Spanish version of Undercover Boss premiered on 11 June 2011 on Antena 3 named El jefe, but it was cancelled after 3 episodes due to low viewership ratings. Three years later, Atresmedia adapted the programme, this time on the channel laSexta, where it premiered on 3 April 2014 under the title El jefe infiltrado.

=== United Kingdom ===
The original UK series, produced by Studio Lambert, started airing on 15 June 2009 on Channel 4 and ended its sixth and final series for the broadcaster on 20 August 2014. In 2021, Studio Lambert put a new series of Undercover Boss in to production, with the rights to broadcast the series moving over to ITV. The new series titled Undercover Big Boss, consisting of four episodes premiered on 5 August 2021.

=== United States ===
The first episode of the US series, also produced by Studio Lambert, premiered on 7 February 2010 after Super Bowl XLIV and featured Larry O'Donnell, then-President and Chief Operating Officer of Waste Management, Inc.

On 9 March 2010, CBS announced it had commissioned Undercover Boss for a second season. On 28 July, CBS announced four company executives from NASCAR, DirecTV, Chiquita Brands International, and Great Wolf Lodge, Inc. had signed up for the second season of Undercover Boss. The second season opener was the Choice Hotels CEO, Steve Joyce on 26 September 2010.

The series was a ratings success for the network, with its premiere episode receiving 38.6 million viewers and a share of 32%. The first season was the most popular new show in any genre in the 2009–10 television season with an average audience of 17.7 million viewers.

CBS's premiere of Undercover Boss on 7 February 2010, immediately following the network's coverage of Super Bowl XLIV, delivered 38.6 million viewers—the largest audience ever for a new series following the Super Bowl since the advent of people meters in 1987, the largest audience ever to watch the premiere episode of a reality series, and the most watched new series premiere overall on television since Dolly on 27 September 1987 (39.47 million). It was also the third largest post-Super Bowl audience behind Friends Special on 28 January 1996 and Survivor: The Australian Outback on 28 January 2001. Repeats of Undercover Boss were picked up by TLC, beginning 25 July 2011; and OWN: Oprah Winfrey Network, beginning Fall 2012. TLC also picked up selected episodes of the UK, Canadian and Australian versions, which aired as Undercover Boss: Abroad; this series debuted on Monday, 13 February 2012, with TLC broadcasting the series most Monday nights, and OWN airing the series on Tuesday nights beginning 13 March 2012. The fourth season premiered on 2 November 2012 on CBS. On 13 March 2014, CBS announced the sixth season renewal of Undercover Boss. The ninth season premiered on 8 January 2020.

Undercover Boss won the Primetime Emmy Award for Outstanding Reality Program in 2013 and 2012 having also been nominated in the same category in 2011 and 2010.

Undercover Boss has been criticised as a reality show for presenting scenarios and situations which rarely happen to employees in real workplaces and are in fact dramatic tricks. Others point out that CEOs in real-life workplaces do not typically go out of their way to provide gifts and other extra benefits to front-line employees at the expense of the bottom line. Alex McLevy of The A.V. Club was severely critical of the show: "Undercover Boss is some of the most blatant propaganda on American television. It's a shameless endorsement of capitalist inequality that may as well end each episode by reminding everyday Americans that they should shut up and be grateful their lives are controlled by such selfless exemplars of virtue. It's class warfare in everything but name."

On 30 September 2026, CBS announced the twelfth season of the series, with Drew Carey serving as narrator for the twelfth series scheduled to be broadcast in 2027.

==== Celebrity ====
In May 2018 CBS aired a celebrity season of the series, after two celebrity episodes aired as part of the prior season.

== International broadcasts ==
The American version has been broadcast on a variety of international networks:

The network in bold indicates that they also air their own version of Undercover Boss.

Country	Network
Argentina	FOX Life
Australia	**Network Ten**
Austria	**ORF eins**
Brazil	GNT/**Rede Globo** and Fox Life
Bulgaria	NOVA
Canada	CTV and **W Network**
Colombia	**RCN Televisión**
Croatia	RTL Living
Czech Republic	**TV Nova**
Finland	MTV3
France	**M6**
Germany	**RTL**
Hungary	**RTL Klub**
India	BBC Entertainment
Indonesia	B-Channel
Iran	Manoto (United Kingdom)
Israel	Channel 2
Italy	**RAI 2**
Japan	WOWOW
Netherlands	RTL 4 and **Veronica** Currently: **RTL Z**
New Zealand	TVNZ 1, Bravo
Norway	TV Norge
Panama	Fox Life
Philippines	CNN Philippines
Poland	BBC, **TVP1**, **Fokus TV**
Portugal	Sic Radical
Romania	Pro TV
Singapore	Channel 5
Slovenia	Kanal A
South Korea	MBC
Spain	Antena 3, la Sexta
Sweden	TV3
Thailand	TrueVisions
United Kingdom	Channel 4

In addition, international versions have been aired in the United States on TLC and Oprah Winfrey Network, under the umbrella title Undercover Boss Abroad.

== See also ==
- Back to the Floor (British TV series)
- Back to the Floor (Canadian TV series)
- Secret Millionaire (British TV series)
