= List of Transparent episodes =

Transparent is an American comedy-drama television series created by Joey Soloway for Amazon Studios that debuted on February 6, 2014. The story revolves around a Los Angeles family and their lives following the discovery that the person they knew as their father Mort (Jeffrey Tambor) is a transgender woman named Maura. Transparent's full first season premiered on September 26, 2014. The show was renewed for a second season on October 9, 2014, which premiered on December 11, 2015. On June 25, 2015, Amazon renewed the show for a third season consisting of ten episodes. In August 2017, Amazon renewed the series for a fifth and final season, which ultimately took the form of a feature-length finale titled the Transparent Musicale Finale. It does not include Tambor due to sexual harassment allegations.

As of September 21, 2017, 40 episodes of Transparent have been released, concluding the fourth season. A film conclusion was released on September 27, 2019.

== Series overview ==
Season	Episodes	Originally released	
Season	Episodes	First released	Last released
1	10	February 6, 2014	September 26, 2014
2	10	November 30, 2015	December 11, 2015
3	10	September 23, 2016	
4	10	September 21, 2017	
Film		September 27, 2019	

== Episodes ==
=== Season 1 (2014) ===
No. overall	No. in season	Title	Directed by	Written by	Original release date
1	1	"Pilot"	Joey Soloway	Joey Soloway	February 6, 2014
Maura Pfefferman can't gather the courage to announce that she wants to become a woman. She, nevertheless, announces her retirement and intention to sell the family house. Shelly Pfefferman (Maura's ex-spouse) says that the home had been bought for $83,000 in 1972. Maura attends counseling sessions at the Los Angeles LGBT Center.
2	2	"The Letting Go"	Joey Soloway	Joey Soloway	September 26, 2014
Maura begins coming out to her children and continues to embrace her true identity. Sarah introduces her husband to her ex-girlfriend Tammy as tensions begin to rise. Ali becomes close with her trainer, as Josh is reminded of his past with a visit to his ex-babysitter, Rita.
3	3	"Rollin"	Joey Soloway	Bridget Bedard	September 26, 2014
Complications arise for the Pfefferman family as Sarah’s marriage begins to strain, Josh is fired, and Ali struggles to find meaning in her life. Maura’s early exploration with her identity shines through in flashbacks.
4	4	"Moppa"	Nisha Ganatra	Micah Fitzerman-Blue & Noah Harpster	September 26, 2014
Maura Pfefferman faces verbal harassment in the women's restroom at a shopping mall.
5	5	"Wedge"	Nisha Ganatra	Ali Liebegott	September 26, 2014
Shelley’s husband, Ed, is missing and the Pfefferman children team up to find him, only to be faced with questions of their past. Josh discovers Maura’s truth, and Maura begins to find community within her support group.
6	6	"The Wilderness"	Joey Soloway	Ethan Kuperberg	September 26, 2014
While grappling with their feelings about Maura, Josh seeks guidance from Rabbi Raquel. Ali takes a gender studies class with Syd, and Sarah is faced with questions from her children after they meet Maura for the first time.
7	7	"Symbolic Exemplar"	Joey Soloway	Faith Soloway	September 26, 2014
Josh explores his relationship with Rabbi Raquel while Ali explores her relationship with her transgender teaching assistant in her Gender Studies program. The Pfefferman children join together to support Maura’s performance singing in a talent show, only for their romantic and personal lives to disrupt their attendance. Maura overlooks the crowd, saddened to find all of her children have left.
8	8	"Best New Girl"	Joey Soloway	Bridget Bedard	September 26, 2014
In a flashback sequence, Mort and Mark attend a cross-dressing retreat. Thirteen-year-old Ali is left home alone after Josh leaves with Rita, and Mort leaves for the camp. Ali hangs out with an older man she finds at the beach.
9	9	"Looking Up"	Nisha Ganatra	Micah Fitzerman-Blue & Noah Harpster	September 26, 2014
Maura and Shelley confide in each other as Maura is upset with her children and Shelley deals with Ed’s end of life care. Sarah questions if she made the right decision leaving Len for Tammy, and Josh and Raquel discover their feelings for each other.
10	10	"Why Do We Cover the Mirrors?"	Joey Soloway	Joey Soloway	September 26, 2014
The Pfefferman family unites for Ed’s funeral where Maura, Shelley and the children revisit old relationships and family secrets. Sarah and Len have an intimate talk in a private room. Josh sees his teenage babysitter for the first time in almost 20 years, and it is revealed that he has a teenage son. Ali gets into a fight with Maura, but at the end of the episode, the family comes back together for a meal.

=== Season 2 (2015) ===
No. overall	No. in season	Title	Directed by	Written by	Original release date
11	1	"Kina Hora"	Joey Soloway	Joey Soloway	November 30, 2015
12	2	"Flicky-Flicky Thump-Thump"	Joey Soloway	Micah Fitzerman-Blue & Noah Harpster	December 11, 2015
13	3	"New World Coming"	Marielle Heller	Faith Soloway	December 11, 2015
14	4	"Cherry Blossoms"	Joey Soloway	Arabella Anderson	December 11, 2015
15	5	"Mee-Maw"	Stacie Passon	Our Lady J	December 11, 2015
16	6	"Bulnerable"	Silas Howard	Bridget Bedard	December 11, 2015
17	7	"The Book of Life"	Jim Frohna	Ethan Kuperberg	December 11, 2015
18	8	"Oscillate"	Andrea Arnold	Bridget Bedard	December 11, 2015
19	9	"Man on the Land"	Joey Soloway	Ali Liebegott	December 11, 2015
20	10	"Grey Green Brown & Copper"	Andrea Arnold	Micah Fitzerman-Blue & Noah Harpster	December 11, 2015

=== Season 3 (2016) ===
No. overall	No. in season	Title	Directed by	Written by	Original release date
21	1	"Elizah"	Joey Soloway	Ethan Kuperberg	September 23, 2016
22	2	"When the Battle Is Over"	Silas Howard	Jessi Klein	September 23, 2016
23	3	"To Sardines and Back"	Joey Soloway	Faith & Joey Soloway	September 23, 2016
24	4	"Just the Facts"	Silas Howard	Micah Fitzerman-Blue & Noah Harpster	September 23, 2016
25	5	"Oh Holy Night"	Stacie Passon	Micah Fitzerman-Blue & Noah Harpster	September 23, 2016
26	6	"The Open Road"	Joey Soloway	Bridget Bedard	September 23, 2016
27	7	"Life Sucks and Then You Die"	Shira Piven	Ali Liebegott	September 23, 2016
28	8	"If I Were a Bell"	Andrea Arnold	Our Lady J	September 23, 2016
29	9	"Off the Grid"	So Yong Kim	Bridget Bedard & Stephanie Kornick	September 23, 2016
30	10	"Exciting and New"	Marta Cunningham	Faith & Joey Soloway	September 23, 2016

=== Season 4 (2017) ===
No. overall	No. in season	Title	Directed by	Written by	Original release date
31	1	"Standing Order"	Joey Soloway	Faith Soloway	September 21, 2017
32	2	"Groin Anomaly"	Allison Liddi-Brown	Ali Liebegott	September 21, 2017
33	3	"Pinkwashing Machine"	Allison Liddi-Brown	Our Lady J	September 21, 2017
34	4	"Cool Guy"	Sarah Gavron	Gabe Liedman	September 21, 2017
35	5	"Born Again"	Marta Cunningham	Stephanie Kornick	September 21, 2017
36	6	"I Never Promised You a Promised Land"	Jim Frohna	Bridget Bedard	September 21, 2017
37	7	"Babar the Borrible"	Gaby Hoffmann	Ali Liebegott	September 21, 2017
38	8	"Desert Eagle"	Andrea Arnold	Ethan Kuperberg	September 21, 2017
39	9	"They Is on the Way"	Joey Soloway	Bridget Bedard	September 21, 2017
40	10	"House Call"	Rhys Ernst	Ethan Kuperberg	September 21, 2017

=== Film (2019) ===
No. overall	No. in season	Title	Directed by	Written by	Original release date
41	1	"Musicale Finale"	Joey Soloway	Faith Soloway & Joey Soloway	September 27, 2019
