= Critics' Choice Television Award for Best Actor in a Comedy Series =

TV award

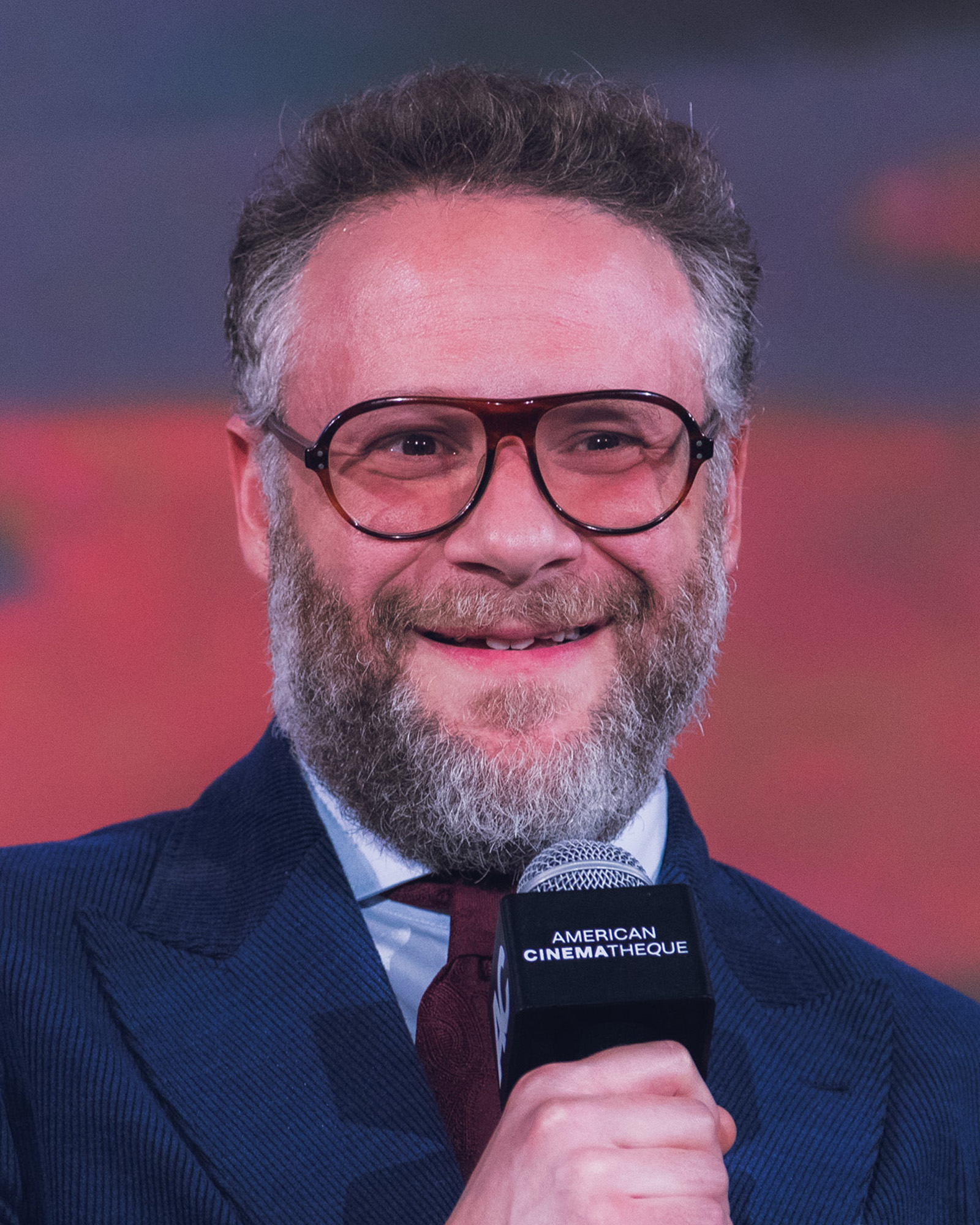
- The 2026 recipient: Seth Rogen
- Country: United States
- Presented by: Critics Choice Association
- First award: 2011
- Currently held by: Seth Rogen – The Studio (2025)
- Website: criticschoice.com

The Critics' Choice Television Award for Best Actor in a Comedy Series is one of the award categories presented annually by the Critics' Choice Television Awards (BTJA) (US) to recognize the work done by television actors.

It was introduced in 2011 when the event was first initiated. The winners are selected by a group of television critics that are part of the Broadcast Television Critics Association.

The current winner in this category is Seth Rogen for The Studio (2025)

== Winners and nominees ==
Indicates the winner

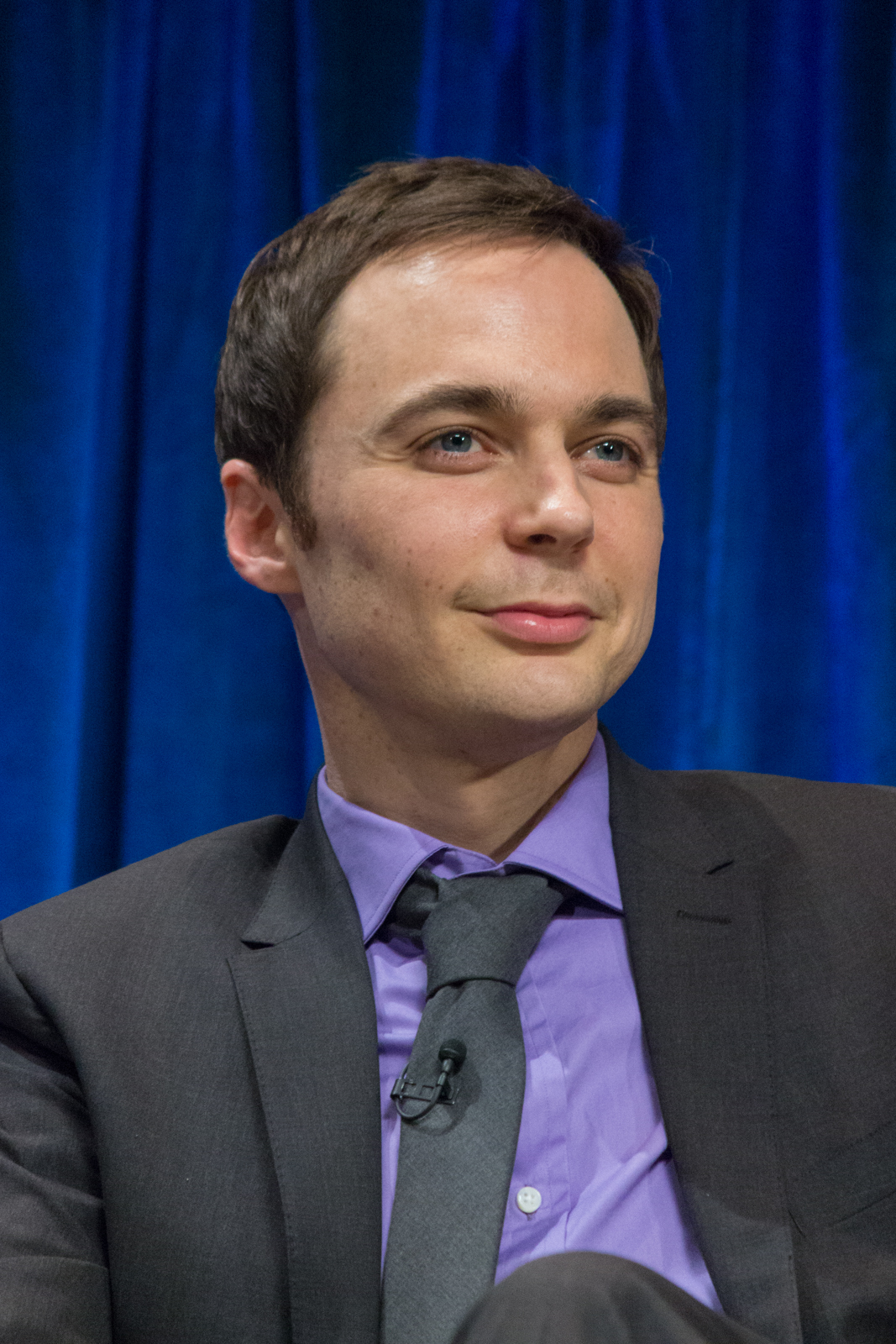
Jim Parsons won twice for The Big Bang Theory (2011, 2014)

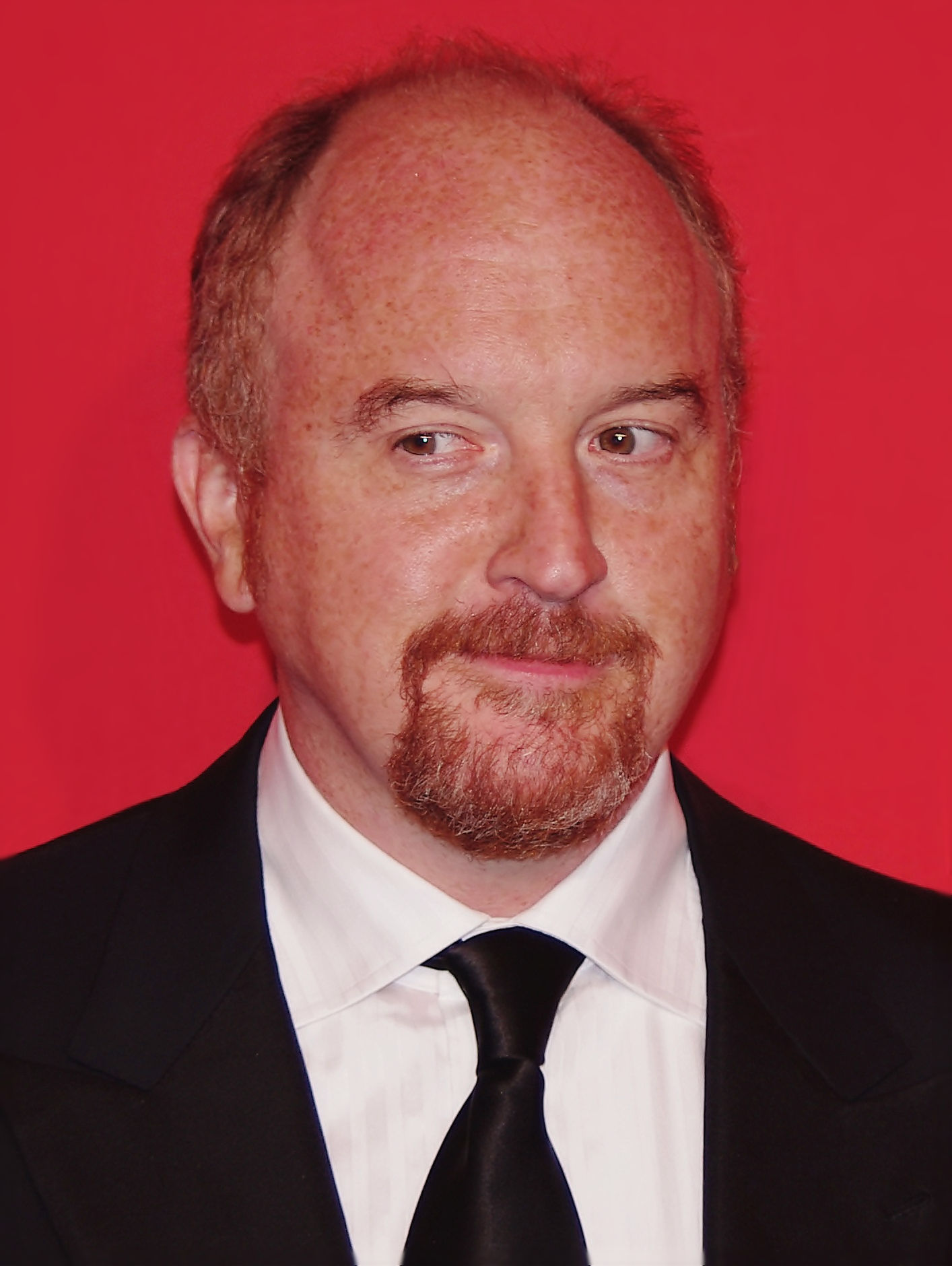
Louis C.K. won twice consecutively for Louie (2012, 2013)

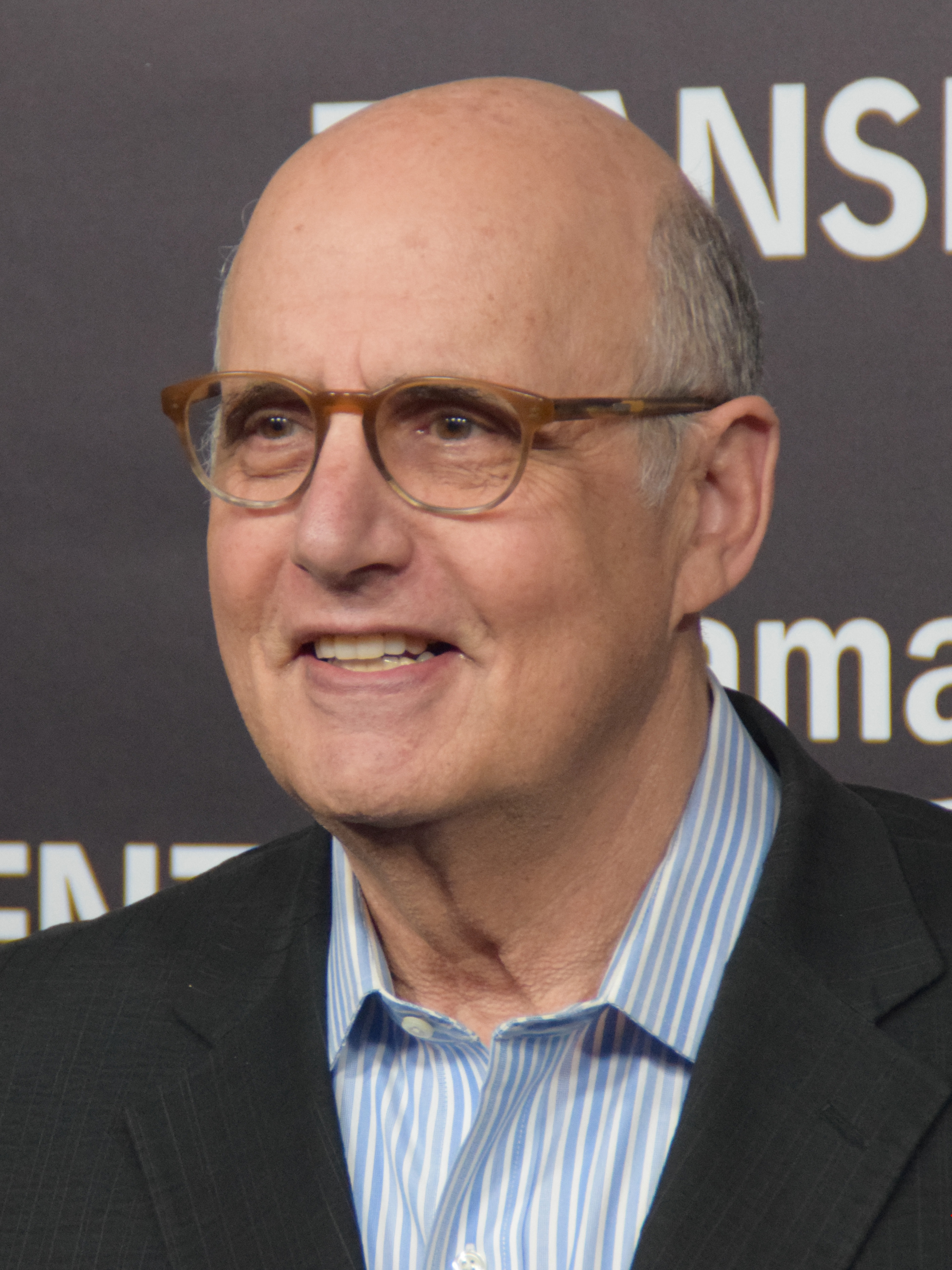
Jeffrey Tambor won twice consecutively for Transparent (2015, 2016)

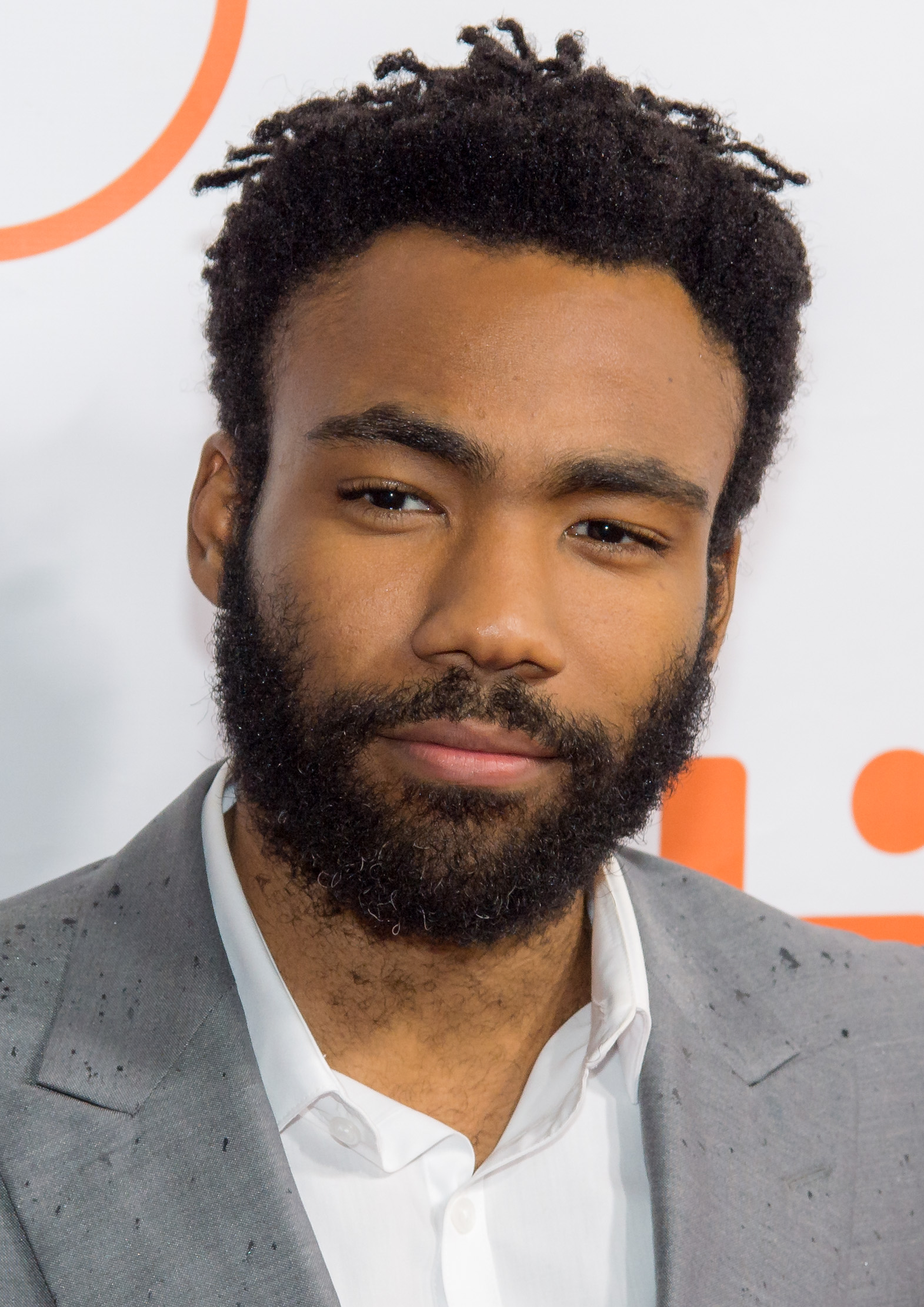
Donald Glover won for Atlanta (2016)

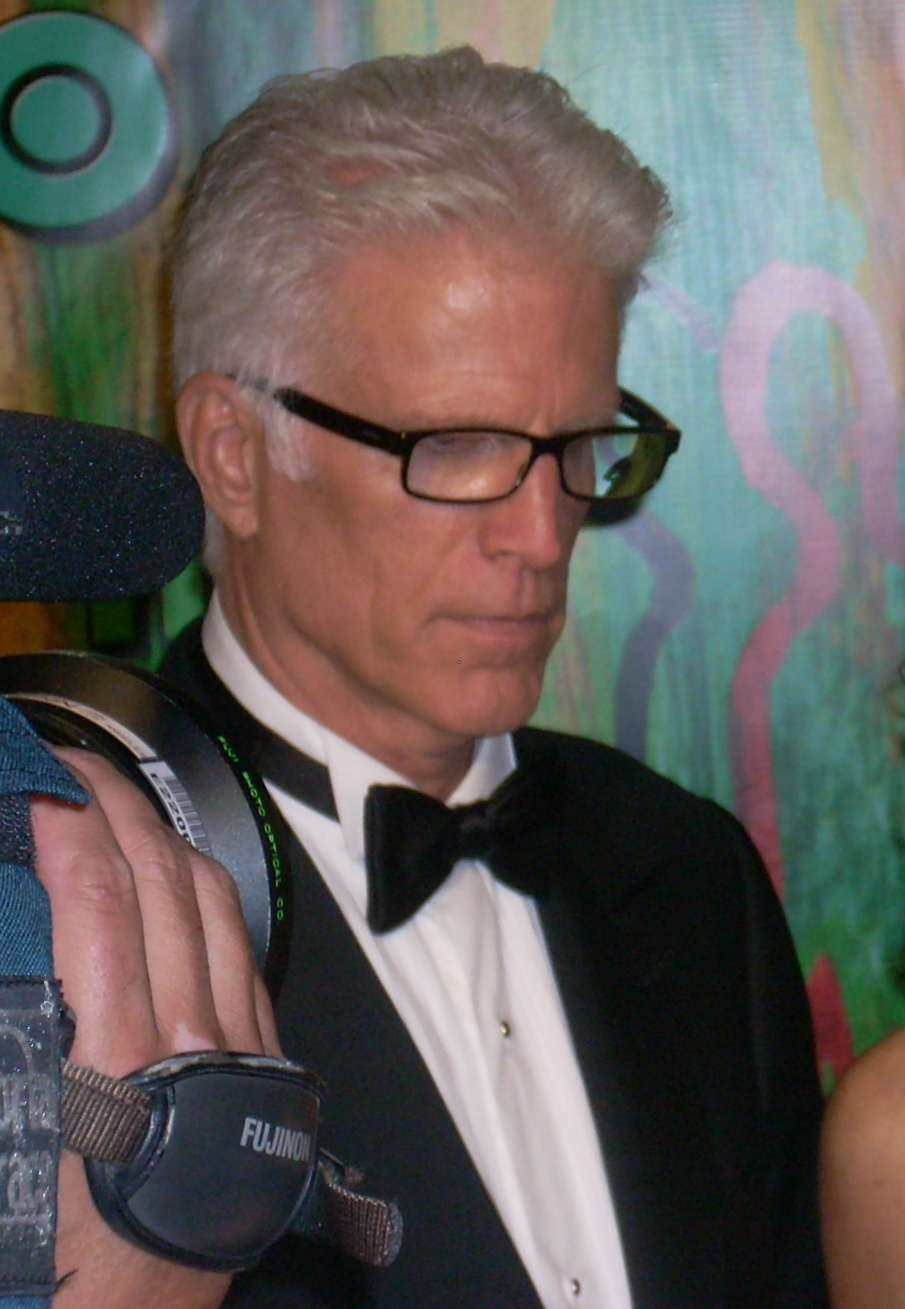
Ted Danson won for The Good Place (2018)

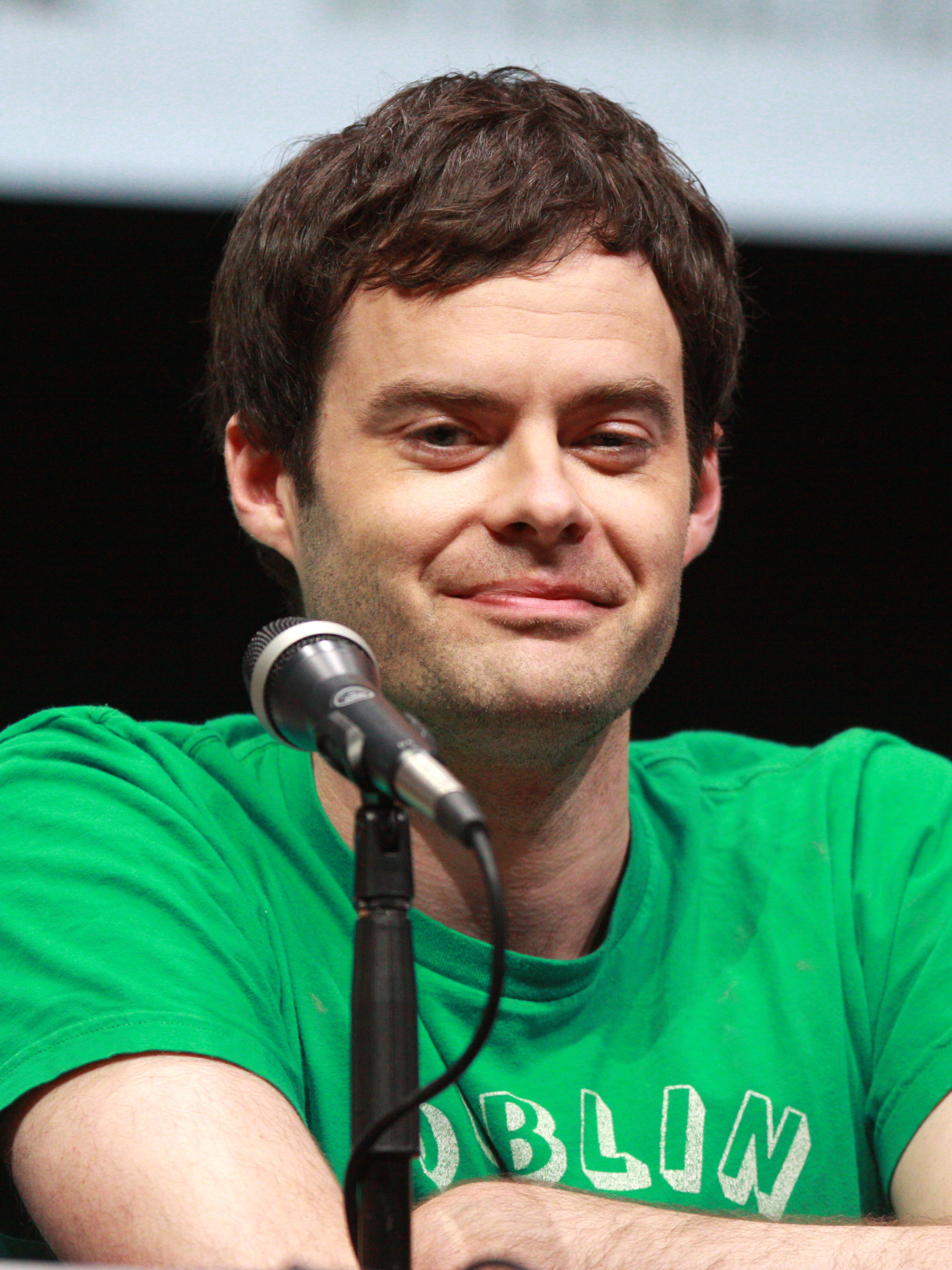
Bill Hader won twice consecutively for Barry (2019, 2020)

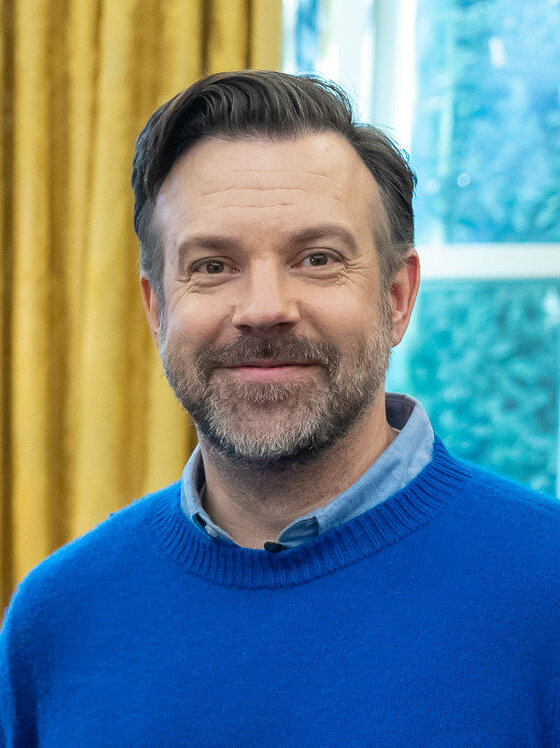
Jason Sudeikis won twice consecutively for Ted Lasso (2021, 2022)

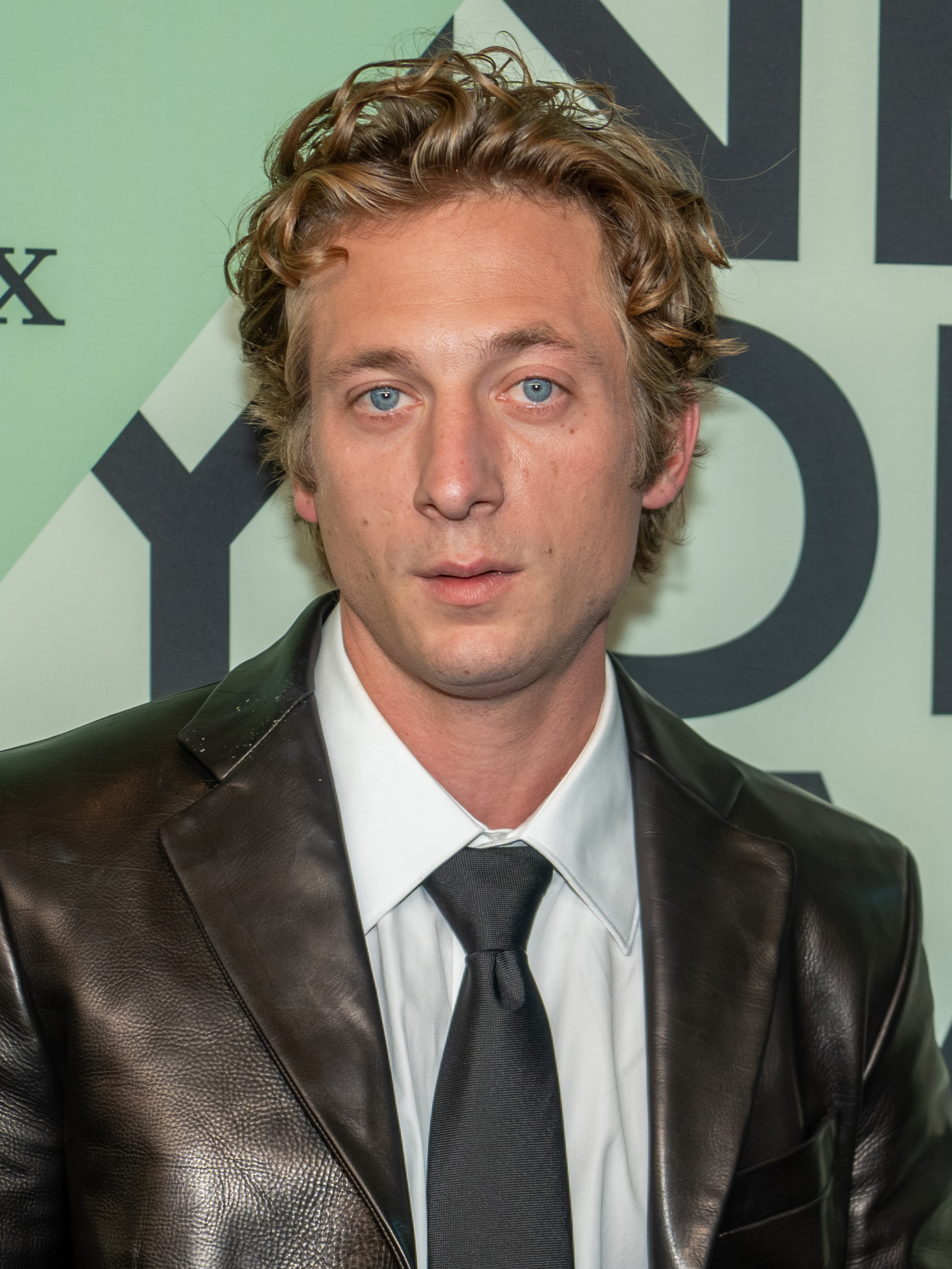
Jeremy Allen White won twice consecutively for The Bear (2023, 2024)

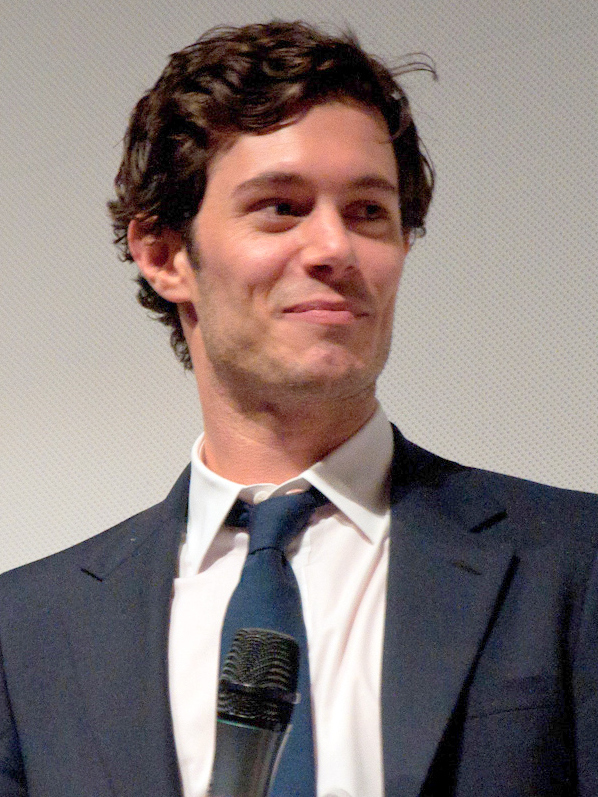
Adam Brody won for Nobody Wants This (2024)

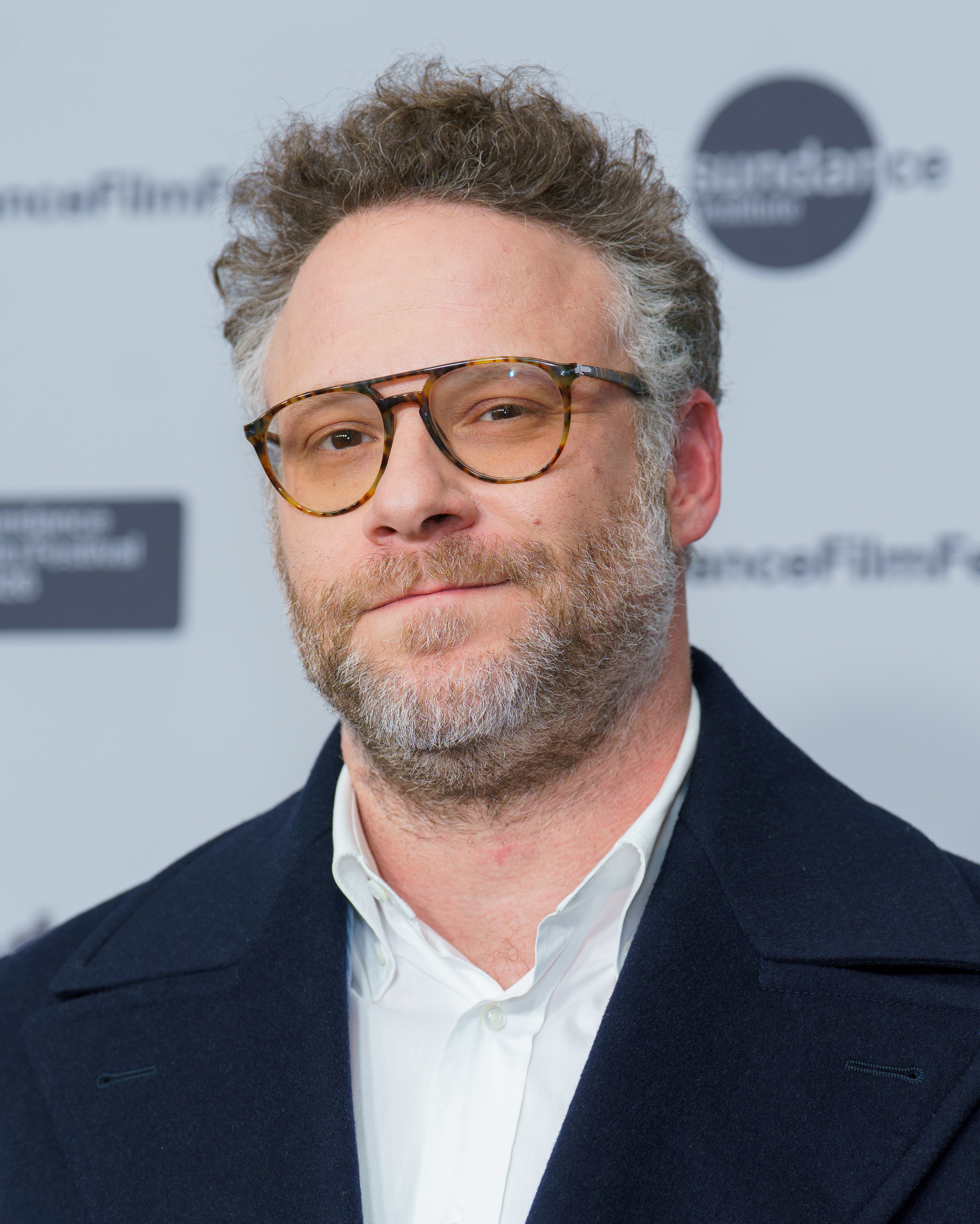
Seth Rogen won for The Studio (2025)

=== 2010s ===
Year	Actor	Role	Program	Network
2011	Jim Parsons	The Big Bang Theory	Sheldon Cooper	CBS
2011	Alec Baldwin	30 Rock	Jack Donaghy	NBC
2011	Louis C.K.	Louie	Louie	FX
2011	Steve Carell	The Office	Michael Scott	NBC
2011	Charlie Day	It's Always Sunny in Philadelphia	Charlie Kelly	FX
2011	Joel McHale	Community	Jeff Winger	NBC
2012	Louis C.K.	Louie	Louie	FX
2012	Don Cheadle	House of Lies	Marty Kaan	Showtime
2012	Larry David	Curb Your Enthusiasm	Himself	HBO
2012	Garret Dillahunt	Raising Hope	Burt Chance	Fox
2012	Joel McHale	Community	Jeff Winger	NBC
2012	Jim Parsons	The Big Bang Theory	Sheldon Cooper	CBS
2013	Louis C.K	Louie	Louie	FX
2013	Don Cheadle	House of Lies	Marty Kaan	Showtime
2013	Jake Johnson	New Girl	Nick Miller	Fox
2013	Jim Parsons	The Big Bang Theory	Sheldon Cooper	CBS
2013	Adam Scott	Parks and Recreation	Ben Wyatt	NBC
2013	Jeremy Sisto	Suburgatory	George Altman	ABC
2014	Jim Parsons	The Big Bang Theory	Sheldon Cooper	CBS
2014	Louis C.K.	Louie	Louie	FX
2014	Chris Messina	The Mindy Project	Dr. Danny Castellano	Fox
2014	Thomas Middleditch	Silicon Valley	Richard Hendriks	HBO
2014	Adam Scott	Parks and Recreation	Ben Wyatt	NBC
2014	Robin Williams	The Crazy Ones	Simon Roberts	CBS
2015	Jeffrey Tambor	Transparent	Maura Pfefferman	Amazon Prime Video
2015	Anthony Anderson	black-ish	Andre "Dre" Johnson, Sr.	ABC
2015	Will Forte	The Last Man on Earth	Phil Miller	Fox
2015	Johnny Galecki	The Big Bang Theory	Leonard Hofstadter	CBS
2015	Chris Messina	The Mindy Project	Dr. Danny Castellano	Fox
2015	Thomas Middleditch	Silicon Valley	Richard Hendriks	HBO
2016 (1)	Jeffrey Tambor	Transparent	Maura Pfefferman	Amazon Prime Video
2016 (1)	Anthony Anderson	black-ish	Andre "Dre" Johnson, Sr.	ABC
2016 (1)	Aziz Ansari	Master of None	Dev Shah	Netflix
2016 (1)	Will Forte	The Last Man on Earth	Phil Miller	Fox
2016 (1)	Randall Park	Fresh Off the Boat	Louis Huang	ABC
2016 (1)	Fred Savage	The Grinder	Stewart Sanderson	Fox
2016 (2)	Donald Glover	Atlanta	Earnest 'Earn' Marks	FX
2016 (2)	Anthony Anderson	black-ish	Andre "Dre" Johnson, Sr.	ABC
2016 (2)	Will Forte	The Last Man on Earth	Phil Miller	Fox
2016 (2)	Bill Hader	Documentary Now!	Various Characters	IFC
2016 (2)	Patrick Stewart	Blunt Talk	Walter Blunt	Starz
2016 (2)	Jeffrey Tambor	Transparent	Maura Pfefferman	Amazon Prime Video
2018	Ted Danson	The Good Place	Michael	NBC
2018	Anthony Anderson	black-ish	Andre "Dre" Johnson, Sr.	ABC
2018	Aziz Ansari	Master of None	Dev Shah	Netflix
2018	Hank Azaria	Brockmire	Jim Brockmire	IFC
2018	Thomas Middleditch	Silicon Valley	Richard Hendriks	HBO
2018	Randall Park	Fresh Off the Boat	Louis Huang	ABC
2019	Bill Hader	Barry	Barry Berkman/Barry Block	HBO
2019	Hank Azaria	Brockmire	Jim Brockmire	IFC
2019	Ted Danson	The Good Place	Michael	NBC
2019	Michael Douglas	The Kominsky Method	Sandy Kominsky	Netflix
2019	Donald Glover	Atlanta	Earnest "Earn" Marks	FX
2019	Jim Parsons	The Big Bang Theory	Sheldon Cooper	CBS
2019	Andy Samberg	Brooklyn Nine-Nine	Jake Peralta	Fox

=== 2020s ===
Year	Actor	Role	Program	Network
2020	Bill Hader	Barry	Barry Berkman/Barry Block	HBO
2020	Ted Danson	The Good Place	Michael	NBC
2020	Walton Goggins	The Unicorn	Wade	CBS
2020	Eugene Levy	Schitt's Creek	Johnny Rose	Pop
2020	Paul Rudd	Living with Yourself	Miles Elliot(s)	Netflix
2020	Bashir Salahuddin	Sherman's Showcase	Sherman McDaniel	IFC
2020	Ramy Youssef	Ramy	Ramy Hassan	Hulu
2021	Jason Sudeikis	Ted Lasso	Ted Lasso	Apple TV+
2021	Hank Azaria	Brockmire	Jim Brockmire	IFC
2021	Matt Berry	What We Do in the Shadows	Laszlo Cravensworth	FX
2021	Nicholas Hoult	The Great	Peter III of Russia	Hulu
2021	Eugene Levy	Schitt's Creek	Johnny Rose	Pop
2021	Ramy Youssef	Ramy	Ramy Hassan	Hulu
2022	Jason Sudeikis	Ted Lasso	Ted Lasso	Apple TV+
2022	Iain Armitage	Young Sheldon	Sheldon Cooper	CBS
2022	Nicholas Hoult	The Great	Peter III of Russia	Hulu
2022	Steve Martin	Only Murders in the Building	Charles-Haden Savage	Hulu
2022	Kayvan Novak	What We Do in the Shadows	Nandor the Relentless	FX
2022	Martin Short	Only Murders in the Building	Oliver Putnam	Hulu
2023	Jeremy Allen White	The Bear	Carmen "Carmy" Berzatto	FX on Hulu
2023	Matt Berry	What We Do in the Shadows	Laszlo Cravensworth	FX
2023	Bill Hader	Barry	Barry Berkman/Barry Block	HBO
2023	Keegan-Michael Key	Reboot	Reed Sterling	Hulu
2023	Steve Martin	Only Murders in the Building	Charles-Haden Savage	Hulu
2023	D'Pharaoh Woon-A-Tai	Reservation Dogs	Bear Smallhill	FX
2024	Jeremy Allen White	The Bear	Carmen "Carmy" Berzatto	FX on Hulu
2024	Bill Hader	Barry	Barry Berkman / Barry Block	HBO
2024	Steve Martin	Only Murders in the Building	Charles-Haden Savage	Hulu
2024	Kayvan Novak	What We Do in the Shadows	Nandor the Relentless	FX
2024	Drew Tarver	The Other Two	Cary Dubek	Comedy Central / HBO
2024	D'Pharaoh Woon-A-Tai	Reservation Dogs	Bear Smallhill	FX
2025
2025	Adam Brody	Nobody Wants This	Noah Roklov	Netflix
2025	Brian Jordan Alvarez	English Teacher	Evan Marquez	FX
2025	David Alan Grier	St. Denis Medical	Ron	NBC / Peacock
2025	Steve Martin	Only Murders in the Building	Charles-Haden Savage	Hulu
2025	Kayvan Novak	What We Do in the Shadows	Nandor the Relentless	FX
2025	Martin Short	Only Murders in the Building	Oliver Putnam	Hulu
2026
2026	Seth Rogen	The Studio	Matt Remick	Apple TV+
2026	Adam Brody	Nobody Wants This	Noah Roklov	Netflix
2026	Ted Danson	A Man on the Inside	Charles Nieuwendyk	Netflix
2026	David Alan Grier	St. Denis Medical	Ron	NBC / Peacock
2026	Danny McBride	The Righteous Gemstones	Jesse Gemstone	HBO Max
2026	Alexander Skarsgård	Murderbot	Murderbot	Apple TV+

== Performers superlatives ==
=== Multiple wins ===
2 wins

- Louis C.K. (consecutive)
- Bill Hader (consecutive)
- Jim Parsons
- Jason Sudeikis (consecutive)
- Jeffrey Tambor (consecutive)
- Jeremy Allen White (consecutive)

=== Multiple nominations ===
5 nominations

- Bill Hader
- Jim Parsons

4 nominations

- Anthony Anderson
- Louis C.K.
- Ted Danson
- Steve Martin

3 nominations

- Hank Azaria
- Will Forte
- Thomas Middleditch
- Kayvan Novak
- Jeffrey Tambor

2 nominations

- Aziz Ansari
- Matt Berry
- Adam Brody
- Don Cheadle
- Donald Glover
- David Alan Grier
- Nicholas Hoult
- Eugene Levy
- Joel McHale
- Chris Messina
- Randall Park
- Adam Scott
- Martin Short
- Jason Sudeikis
- Jeremy Allen White
- D'Pharaoh Woon-A-Tai
- Ramy Youssef

== Program superlatives ==
=== Multiple wins ===
2 wins

- Barry
- The Bear
- The Big Bang Theory
- Louie
- Ted Lasso
- Transparent

=== Multiple nominations ===
6 nominations

- The Big Bang Theory
- Only Murders in the Building

5 nominations

- What We Do in the Shadows

4 nominations

- Barry
- black-ish
- Louie

3 nominations

- Brockmire
- The Good Place
- The Last Man on Earth
- Silicon Valley
- Transparent

2 nominations

- Atlanta
- The Bear
- Community
- Fresh Off the Boat
- The Great
- House of Lies
- Master of None
- The Mindy Project
- Nobody Wants This
- Parks and Recreation
- Ramy
- Reservation Dogs
- Schitt's Creek
- St. Denis Medical
- Ted Lasso

== See also ==
- TCA Award for Individual Achievement in Comedy
- Primetime Emmy Award for Outstanding Lead Actor in a Comedy Series
- Golden Globe Award for Best Actor – Television Series Musical or Comedy
- Screen Actors Guild Award for Outstanding Performance by a Male Actor in a Comedy Series
