= Satellite Award for Best Actor =

Satellite Award for Best Actor may refer to:

- Satellite Award for Best Actor – Motion Picture
- Satellite Award for Best Actor – Television Series Drama
- Satellite Award for Best Actor – Television Series Musical or Comedy
- Satellite Award for Best Actor – Miniseries or Television Film
