= Satellite Award for Best Actor – Television Series Musical or Comedy =

Annual television award

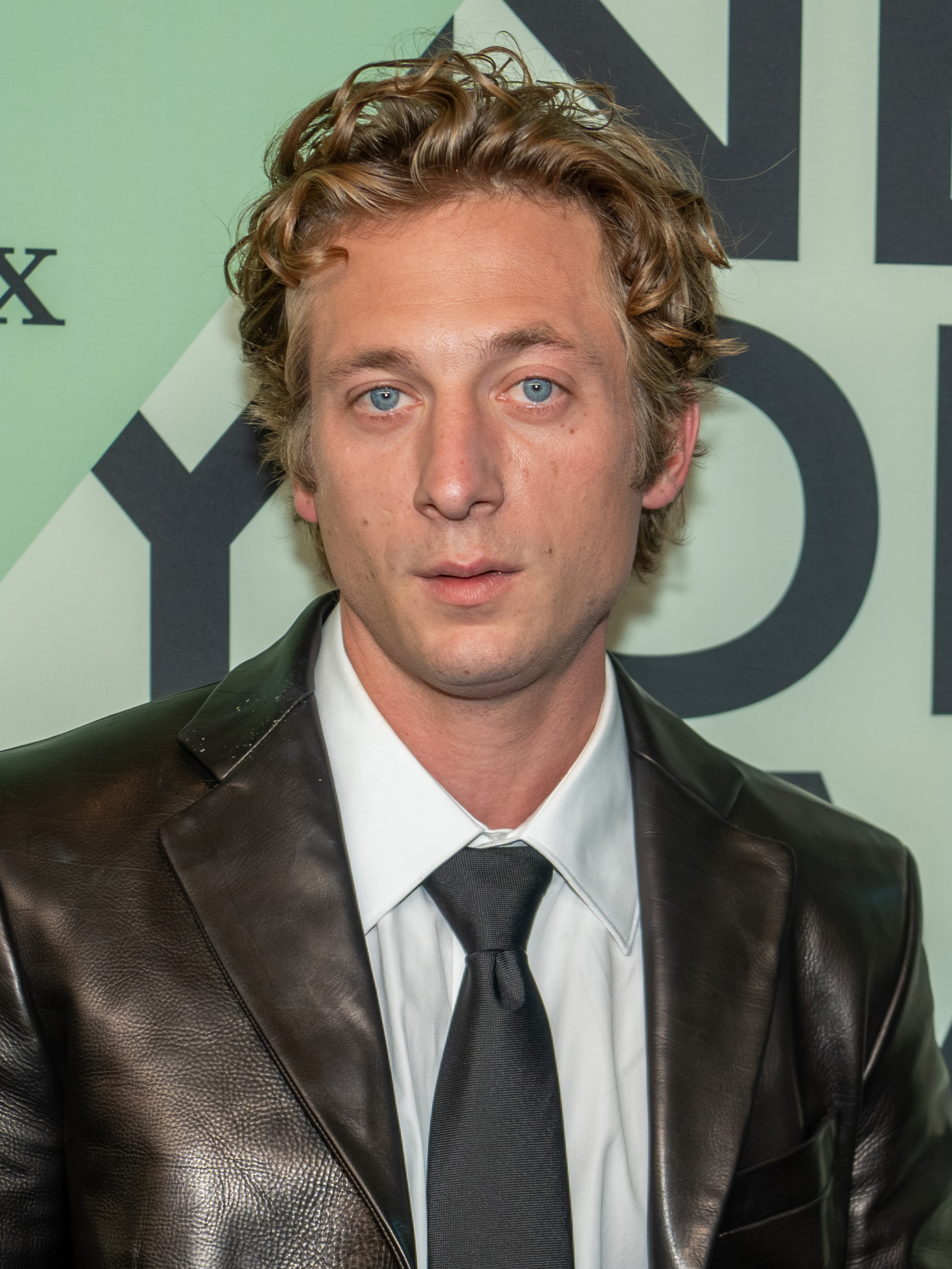
- The 2023 recipient: Jeremy Allen White
- Awarded for: Best Actor in a Musical or Comedy Series
- Country: United States
- Presented by: International Press Academy
- First award: 1996
- Currently held by: Jeremy Allen White – The Bear (2023)

The Satellite Award for Best Actor in a Television Series – Musical or Comedy is one of the annual Satellite Awards given by the International Press Academy.

== Winners and nominees ==
=== 1990s ===
Year	Actor	Series	Role	Network
1996	John Lithgow	3rd Rock from the Sun	Dr. Dick Solomon	NBC
1996	Michael J. Fox	Spin City	Mike Flaherty	ABC
1996	Michael Richards	Seinfeld	Cosmo Kramer	NBC
1996	Garry Shandling	The Larry Sanders Show	Larry Sanders	HBO
1996	Rip Torn	The Larry Sanders Show	Arthur	HBO
1997	Kelsey Grammer	Frasier	Dr. Frasier Crane	NBC
1997	Tim Allen	Home Improvement	Tim Taylor	ABC
1997	Drew Carey	The Drew Carey Show	Drew Carey	ABC
1997	Michael J. Fox	Spin City	Mike Flaherty	ABC
1997	Garry Shandling	The Larry Sanders Show	Larry Sanders	HBO
1998	Drew Carey	The Drew Carey Show	Drew Carey	ABC
1998	John Lithgow	3rd Rock from the Sun	Dr. Dick Solomon	NBC
1998	Kelsey Grammer	Frasier	Dr. Frasier Crane	NBC
1998	Paul Reiser	Mad About You	Paul Buchman	NBC
1998	Michael J. Fox	Spin City	Mike Flaherty	ABC
1999	Jay Mohr	Action	Peter Dragon	Fox
1999	Ted Danson	Becker	Dr. John Becker	CBS
1999	Thomas Gibson	Dharma & Greg	Greg Montgomery	ABC
1999	David Hyde Pierce	Frasier	Dr. Niles Crane	NBC
1999	Eric McCormack	Will & Grace	Will Truman	NBC

=== 2000s ===
Year	Actor	Series	Role	Network
2000	Frankie Muniz	Malcolm in the Middle	Malcolm	Fox
2000	Robert Guillaume	Sports Night	Isaac Jaffe	ABC
2000	John Mahoney	Frasier	Martin Crane	NBC
2000	Sean Hayes	Will & Grace	Jack McFarland	NBC
2000	Stacy Keach	Titus	Ken Titus	Fox
2001	Kelsey Grammer	Frasier	Dr. Frasier Crane	NBC
2001	Ray Romano	Everybody Loves Raymond	Raymond Barone	CBS
2001	Tom Cavanagh	Ed	Ed Stevens	NBC
2001	Eric McCormack	Will & Grace	Will Truman	NBC
2001	George Segal	Just Shoot Me!	Jack Gallo	NBC
2002	Bernie Mac	The Bernie Mac Show	Bernie "Mac" McCullough	Fox
2002	Eric McCormack	Will & Grace	Will Truman	NBC
2002	Matt LeBlanc	Friends	Joey Tribbiani	NBC
2002	John C. McGinley	Scrubs	Dr. Perry Cox	NBC
2002	Damon Wayans	My Wife and Kids	Michael Kyle	ABC
2003	Bernie Mac	The Bernie Mac Show	Bernie "Mac" McCullough	Fox
2003	Sacha Baron Cohen	Da Ali G Show	Ali G	HBO
2003	Larry David	Curb Your Enthusiasm	Himself	HBO
2003	Bryan Cranston	Malcolm in the Middle	Hal	Fox
2003	Eric McCormack	Will & Grace	Will Truman	NBC
2003	Tony Shalhoub	Monk	Adrian Monk	USA Network
2003	Damon Wayans	My Wife and Kids	Michael Kyle	ABC
2004	Jason Bateman	Arrested Development	Michael Bluth	Fox
2004	Zach Braff	Scrubs	John "J.D." Dorian	NBC
2004	Larry David	Curb Your Enthusiasm	Himself	HBO
2004	Bernie Mac	The Bernie Mac Show	Bernie "Mac" McCullough	Fox
2004	Damon Wayans	My Wife and Kids	Michael Kyle	ABC
2005	Jason Bateman	Arrested Development	Michael Bluth	Fox
2005	Stephen Colbert	The Colbert Report	Himself	Comedy Central
2005	Kevin Connolly	Entourage	Eric Murphy	HBO
2005	Jason Lee	My Name Is Earl	Earl Hickey	NBC
2005	Damon Wayans	My Wife and Kids	Michael Kyle	ABC
2005	James Spader	Boston Legal	Alan Shore	ABC
2005	Tony Shalhoub	Monk	Adrian Monk	USA Network
2006	James Spader	Boston Legal	Alan Shore	ABC
2006	Stephen Colbert	The Colbert Report	Himself	Comedy Central
2006	Jason Lee	My Name Is Earl	Earl Hickey	NBC
2006	Steve Carell	The Office	Michael Scott	NBC
2006	Ted Danson	Help Me Help You	Dr. Bill Hoffman	ABC
2006	James Roday	Psych	Shawn Spencer	USA Network
2007	Stephen Colbert	The Colbert Report	Himself	Comedy Central
2007	Steve Carell	The Office	Michael Scott	NBC
2007	Alec Baldwin	30 Rock	Jack Donaghy	NBC
2007	Zachary Levi	Chuck	Chuck Bartowski	NBC
2007	Ricky Gervais	Extras	Andy Millman	HBO
2007	Lee Pace	Pushing Daisies	Ned	ABC
2008	Justin Kirk	Weeds	Andy Botwin	Showtime
2008	Alec Baldwin	30 Rock	Jack Donaghy	NBC
2008	Danny DeVito	It's Always Sunny in Philadelphia	Frank Reynolds	FX
2008	David Duchovny	Californication	Hank Moody	Showtime
2008	Jonny Lee Miller	Eli Stone	Eli Stone	ABC
2008	Lee Pace	Pushing Daisies	Ned	ABC
2009	Matthew Morrison	Glee	Will Schuester	Fox
2009	Alec Baldwin	30 Rock	Jack Donaghy	NBC
2009	Jemaine Clement	Flight of the Conchords	Jemaine Clemaine	HBO
2009	Danny McBride	Eastbound & Down	Kenny Powers	HBO
2009	Stephen Colbert	The Colbert Report	Himself	Comedy Central
2009	Jim Parsons	The Big Bang Theory	Dr. Sheldon Cooper	CBS

=== 2010s ===
Year	Actor	Series	Role	Network
2010	Alec Baldwin	30 Rock	Jack Donaghy	NBC
2010	Danny McBride	Eastbound & Down	Kenny Powers	HBO
2010	Thomas Jane	Hung	Ray Drecker	HBO
2010	Matthew Morrison	Glee	Will Schuester	Fox
2010	Steve Carell	The Office	Michael Scott	NBC
2010	Jim Parsons	The Big Bang Theory	Dr. Sheldon Cooper	CBS
2011	Louis C.K.	Louie	Louie	FX
2011	Martin Clunes	Doc Martin	Dr. Martin Ellingham	ITV
2011	Charlie Day	It's Always Sunny in Philadelphia	Charlie Kelly	FX
2011	Elijah Wood	Wilfred	Ryan Newman	FX
2011	Matt LeBlanc	Episodes	Himself	Showtime
2011	Joel McHale	Community	Jeff Winger	NBC
2012	Johnny Galecki	The Big Bang Theory	Dr. Leonard Hofstadter	CBS
2012	Will Arnett	Up All Night	Chris Brinkley	NBC
2012	Joel McHale	Community	Jeff Winger	NBC
2012	Don Cheadle	House of Lies	Marty Kaan	Showtime
2012	Louis C.K.	Louie	Louie	FX
2012	Jim Parsons	The Big Bang Theory	Dr. Sheldon Cooper	CBS
2013	John Goodman	Alpha House	Senator Gil John Biggs	Prime Video
2013	Mathew Baynton	The Wrong Mans	Sam Pinkett	BBC Two
2013	James Corden	The Wrong Mans	Phil Bourne	BBC Two
2013	Andre Braugher	Brooklyn Nine-Nine	Captain Raymond Holt	Fox
2013	Jake Johnson	New Girl	Nick Miller	Fox
2013	Don Cheadle	House of Lies	Marty Kaan	Showtime
2013	Jim Parsons	The Big Bang Theory	Dr. Sheldon Cooper	CBS
2014	Jeffrey Tambor	Transparent	Maura Pfefferman	Prime Video
2014	Louis C.K.	Louie	Louie	FX
2014	John Goodman	Alpha House	Senator Gil John Biggs	Prime Video
2014	William H. Macy	Shameless	Frank Gallagher	Showtime
2014	Thomas Middleditch	Silicon Valley	Richard Hendricks	HBO
2014	Jim Parsons	The Big Bang Theory	Dr. Sheldon Cooper	CBS
2015	Jeffrey Tambor	Transparent	Maura Pfefferman	Prime Video
2015	Louis C.K.	Louie	Louie	FX
2015	Will Forte	The Last Man on Earth	Phil Miller	Fox
2015	Chris Messina	The Mindy Project	Dr. Danny Castellano	Fox
2015	Colin Hanks	Life in Pieces	Greg Short	CBS
2015	Thomas Middleditch	Silicon Valley	Richard Hendricks	HBO
2016	William H. Macy	Shameless	Frank Gallagher	Showtime
2016	Anthony Anderson	Black-ish	Andre "Dre" Johnson Sr.	ABC
2016	Jeffrey Tambor	Transparent	Maura Pfefferman	Prime Video
2016	Rob Delaney	Catastrophe	Rob Norris	Prime Video
2016	Will Forte	The Last Man on Earth	Phil Miller	Fox
2016	Thomas Middleditch	Silicon Valley	Richard Hendricks	HBO
2017	William H. Macy	Shameless	Frank Gallagher	Showtime
2017	Aziz Ansari	Master of None	Dev Shah	Netflix
2017	Neil Patrick Harris	A Series of Unfortunate Events	Count Olaf	Netflix
2017	Zach Galifianakis	Baskets	Chip and Dale Baskets	FX
2017	Thomas Middleditch	Silicon Valley	Richard Hendricks	HBO
2017	John Lithgow	Trial & Error	Larry Henderson	NBC
2018	Bill Hader	Barry	Barry Berkman / Barry Block	HBO
2018	Anthony Anderson	Black-ish	Andre "Dre" Johnson Sr.	ABC
2018	Ted Danson	The Good Place	Michael	NBC
2018	Thomas Middleditch	Silicon Valley	Richard Hendricks	HBO
2018	Donald Glover	Atlanta	Earnest "Earn" Marks	FX
2018	William H. Macy	Shameless	Frank Gallagher	Showtime
2019	Thomas Middleditch	Silicon Valley	Richard Hendricks	HBO
2019	Ted Danson	The Good Place	Michael	NBC
2019	Michael Douglas	The Kominsky Method	Sandy Kominsky	Netflix
2019	Bill Hader	Barry	Barry Berkman / Barry Block	HBO
2019	Danny McBride	The Righteous Gemstones	Jesse Gemstone	HBO
2019	Eugene Levy	Schitt's Creek	Johnny Rose	Pop TV

=== 2020s ===
Year	Actor	Series	Role	Network
2020	Eugene Levy	Schitt's Creek	Johnny Rose	Pop TV
2020	Dave Burd	Dave	Himself	FXX
2020	Ricky Gervais	After Life	Tony Johnson	Netflix
2020	Nicholas Hoult	The Great	Peter III of Russia	Hulu
2020	Jason Sudeikis	Ted Lasso	Ted Lasso	Apple TV+
2020	Ramy Youssef	Ramy	Ramy Hassan	Hulu
2021	Jason Sudeikis	Ted Lasso	Ted Lasso	Apple TV+
2021	Paul Bettany	WandaVision	Vision	Disney+
2021	Michael Douglas	The Kominsky Method	Sandy Kominsky	Netflix
2021	Jay Duplass	The Chair	Bill Dobson	Netflix
2021	Steve Martin	Only Murders in the Building	Charles-Haden Savage	Hulu
2021	Alan Tudyk	Resident Alien	Dr. Harry Vanderspeigle	Syfy
2022	Bill Hader	Barry	Barry Berkman / Barry Block	HBO
2022	Donald Glover	Atlanta	Earnest "Earn" Marks	FX
2022	Danny McBride	The Righteous Gemstones	Jesse Gemstone	HBO
2022	Craig Robinson	Killing It	Craig Foster	Peacock
2022	Martin Short	Only Murders in the Building	Oliver Putnam	Hulu
2022	Alan Tudyk	Resident Alien	Harry Vanderspeigle	Syfy
2023	Jeremy Allen White	The Bear	Carmen "Carmy" Berzatto	FX on Hulu
2023	Bill Hader	Barry	Barry Berkman	HBO
2023	Steve Martin	Only Murders in the Building	Charles-Haden Savage	Hulu
2023	Martin Short	Only Murders in the Building	Oliver Putnam	Hulu
2023	Jason Sudeikis	Ted Lasso	Ted Lasso	Apple TV+
