= Jim Frohna =

American cinematographer and director

- Born: Greendale, Wisconsin
- Other name: James Frohna
- Education: New York University
- Occupations: Cinematographer, director
- Years active: 1994 - present
- Notable work: Transparent; I Love Dick; Shrinking; Big Little Lies
- Awards: Emmy Nomination for Best Cinematography (Transparent) (2017)

Jim Frohna is an American cinematographer and director, best known for his work on the ground-breaking, award-winning Amazon series Transparent and I Love Dick as well as the Apple TV+ series Shrinking and the Emmy-winning HBO show Big Little Lies.

== Early life and education ==
Frohna was born and raised in Greendale, Wisconsin. He attended the University of Wisconsin-Madison, then transferred to New York University where he graduated with a Bachelor of Fine Arts from the Tisch School of the Arts.

== Career ==
Frohna's work as a director of photography is known for conveying a palpable sense of intimacy and for capturing the female gaze. In a 2014 IndieWire interview for Transparent, cast members praised Frohna's approach:

"Jim is probably the most intuitive [director of photography] I've ever worked with. He knows before you know where the action is going to go. During this one scene with an argument, he was lying in the floor just covered in sweat afterward. He's not just photographing it, he's experiencing it. He was all but a cast member."

Frohna began his career as a commercial cinematographer when he stepped in for director of photography Joaquin Baca Asay on the notable Sony Bravia's Sony Balls commercial for director Nicolai Fuglsig in 2005.

Frohna first collaborated with Joey Soloway as director of photography on the comedy-drama Afternoon-Delight, for which Soloway won the award for Best Director at the 2013 Sundance Film Festival. In addition to Soloway, he has worked as director of photography with over 25 eminent DGA directors, including Andrea Arnold, Mike Mills, Michael Showalter, Zetna Fuentes, James Ponsoldt, Jay Duplass, Peyton Reed, Kimberley Pierce, Davis Guggenheim and Jonathan Dayton & Valerie Faris. From 2014 through 2019, Frohna continued with what became a long, rich collaboration with Soloway, serving as the cinematographer on all 5 seasons of the ground-breaking, Emmy-award winning Amazon series Transparent, starring Jeffrey Tambor, Gaby Hoffmann, Jay Duplass, Amy Landecker and Judith Light, In 2017, Frohna joined Soloway and acclaimed indie director Andrea Arnold on the Amazon series I Love Dick, starring Kevin Bacon and Kathryn Hahn. In 2017 Frohna also served as cinematographer on four episodes of the Showtime series I'm Dying Up Here, starring Melissa Leo, Michael Angarano, and Sebastian Stan.

In addition to cinematography, Frohna served as director for multiple episodes of Transparent, including The Book of Life and I Never Promised You a Promised Land, and of I Love Dick for the episode This Is Not A Love Letter.

In February 2018, Frohna began pre-production with director Andrea Arnold for season 2 of the HBO series Big Little Lies, starring Reese Witherspoon, Nicole Kidman, Zoë Kravitz, and Laura Dern.

== Personal life ==
Frohna is married to artist and producer Diana Kunce; they collaborated on the 2018 Sundance Official Selection short Eve with Susan Bay-Nimoy. and the 2019 Sundance Episodic pilot It's Not About Jimmy Keene. They have two children and reside in Los Angeles, CA.

== Filmography ==
=== Film ===
Year	Title	Position	Notes
1994	Suspicious	Electriction	Short Film
1995	The Usual Suspects	Electrician	
2000	Architecture of Reassurance	Gaffer	Short Film
2002	Adaptation	Gaffer (second unit)	
2004	Blade: Trinity	Gaffer	
2005	Thumbsucker	Gaffer	
2006	Red Hot Chili Peppers: Tell Me Baby	Cinematographer	Video
2007	Does Your Soul Have a Cold?	Cinematographer	
2007	Red Hot Chili Peppers: Stadium Arcadium	Cinematographer	
2008	Peep Show	Cinematographer	TV movie
2011	Grace & Mercy	Cinematographer	
2013	Afternoon Delight	Director of Photography	
2014	Break Point	Cinematographer	
2015	No She Wasn't	Cinematographer	Short Film
2016	Dr. Del	Cinematographer	TV movie
2018	Eve	Cinematographer, Producer	Short Film
2024	The Idea of You	Cinematographer	
2026	See You When I See You	Cinematographer	
2026	Verity	Cinematographer	

=== Television ===
Year	Title	Position	Notes
2014-17	Transparent	Cinematographer, Associate Producer	Nominated: Emmy Award for Outstanding Cinematography for a Single-Camera Series (Half-Hour) (2017)
2016-17	I Love Dick	Cinematographer, Director	
2017	I'm Dying Up Here	Cinematographer	
2017	Transparent: The Lost Sessions	Cinematographer	

== Awards and nominations ==
Year	Award	Category	Nominated work	Result	Ref.
2017	69th Primetime Creative Arts Emmy Awards	Outstanding Cinematography for a Single-Camera Series (Half-Hour)	"If I Were a Bell"; Transparent	Nominated	
