= Maura Pfefferman =

Fictional character

- Transparent character
- First appearance: "Pilot"; Season 1, episode 1 February 6, 2014
- Last appearance: "House Call"; Season 4, episode 10; September 21, 2017
- Created by: Joey Soloway
- Portrayed by: Jeffrey Tambor

In-universe information
- Aliases: Morton "Mort" Pfefferman (birth name); Moppa (nickname)
- Occupation: Political Science professor (retired)
- Family: Rose Pfefferman (mother); Bryna Pfefferman (sister); Sarah Pfefferman (daughter); Joshua Pfefferman (son); Alexandra "Ali" Pfefferman (daughter); Simon (nephew); Zack Novak (grandson); Ella Novak (granddaughter); Colton (grandson)
- Significant others: Shelly Pfefferman (ex-wife); Vicki (ex-girlfriend); Donald (boyfriend)

Maura Pfefferman is a fictional character on American web series Transparent, created by Joey Soloway, the series creator and showrunner. Maura is a divorced, Jewish, L.A.-located retired college professor of Political Science and parent of three who comes out as transgender. The character is portrayed by actor Jeffrey Tambor. The role and Tambor's performance have received critical acclaim; among other awards, Tambor has won his first Primetime Emmy Award for Outstanding Lead Actor in a Comedy Series in 2015 for the role, and has twice been nominated for a Golden Globe Award for Best Actor – Television Series Musical or Comedy, winning once in 2015.

== Creation and casting ==
The character of Maura is based on Joey Soloway's own parent, who came out as transgender at the age of 75, three years before the series started. In fact, the character's nickname "Moppa" (an amalgam of 'Momma" and "Poppa") is what Soloway calls their parent, having briefly used the nickname "Mopsy" for her. Soloway considered using their parent's transition as creative inspiration "pretty much like three seconds [after she came out]," but they "couldn't deal with it emotionally or creatively at all for the first year." Soloway and their older sister, Faith, finally committed to basing a project around their parent after observing that, as their "Moppa" was transitioning, and their stepfather was dying, "One was losing his voice while the other was finding hers. My sister and I were both like, 'We've got to write this shit down.' It was cinematic and it was funny and it was sort of like, If this isn't a TV show, I don't know what to do with these feelings."

Amy Landecker, who portrays the character's eldest daughter on the series, explained that Soloway cast Jeffrey Tambor as Maura "from a very personal place", as "in [their] mind, [they] would see Jeffrey through the years and he reminded [them] of [their] father and I think [they] felt very deeply that he was the right actor for this part."

=== Controversy over casting ===
The series has been criticized for the casting Tambor, a cisgender man, as a transgender woman, even prior to the series' premiere date. Soloway has noted in response that the show's treatment of transgender issues extends beyond its protagonist. Additionally, prominent transgender artists Laverne Cox and Jennifer Boylan (who consults for the series) have praised the casting for being representative of older transitioners.

Landecker defended the casting by saying, "This show is great in large part because of him, and I think what Joey tried to do — look, the truth is: he's one of the greatest actors, he wanted to play this, they [Soloway] feel connected to him, [and the character's] also pre-transition when we start the show."

== Storylines ==
=== Season 1 ===
==== 1994 ====
The first season features multiple flashbacks to Maura's life in 1994, when she was living as Mort and married to Shelly (Judith Light). Her interest in femininity is only known to Shelly as a "sex thing". While admiring the models on the cover of a pornographic transgender magazine, Mort meets Marcy (Bradley Whitford), a transvestite who gives her the name "Maura". They befriend each other and decide to go to a weekend-long transvestite camp together, under the pretense of going on a business trip. Although she finds the camp liberating at first, Maura is disturbed by the transvestites' institutional transphobia of rejecting one visitor who started taking hormones. She and Marcy (who is implicitly interested in Maura) have a bitter falling out over Maura's interest in a transvestite's wife staying at the camp. Upon returning from the camp, Maura reveals the truth about the camp to Shelly, who is devastated by the news and asks for a divorce. Despite the end of their marriage, Maura remains firm friends with Shelly.

==== Present day ====
Maura has started participating in a transgender support group, but she has yet to come out to her children. However, Maura is forced to come out to her oldest daughter Sarah (Landecker), when she accidentally runs into her while in full female garb. After a botched attempt at coming out to her son Josh (Jay Duplass), Maura decides to come out to her younger daughter Ali (Gaby Hoffmann). Ali and Sarah, while drunk, reveal that Maura is transgender to Josh, who reacts badly, claiming his parent must have dementia. In an effort to introduce her children to her world, Maura announces she is going to participate in a transgender talent show with her friend Davina (Alexandra Billings). However, Maura's children abandon their seats at the talent show, causing her to become upset.

Maura reignites her friendship with Shelly, and helps her give an overdose of Percocet to her comatose, dementia-addled second husband, Ed. At Ed's funeral, Maura arrives with Davina ostentatiously late in limo, dressed in a showy outfit; she takes advantage of the following shiva to talk about her transition. She and Ali get into a bitter fight about Ali's canceled Bat Mitzvah (Maura took advantage of Ali's cold feet to go to the transvestite camp) and Ali's lack of ambition.

=== Season 2 ===
==== Flashbacks ====
Season 2's flashbacks deal with Maura's tragic family history: her grandfather Haim had gone ahead to America to work, leaving his wife Yetta to work on getting visas for herself and their children, Gershom and Rose. Gershom had become a patient of Magnus Hirschfeld and was living at his clinic, allowed there to express her gender identity under the name Gittel. Rose, fed up with Yetta's fatalism and Haim's absence, accepted Gittel and went to live at the clinic until its destruction by the Nazis. Although Rose was able to escape and joined Yetta in emigrating, Gittel was taken away and never seen again. In spite of her disapproval of Gittel, Yetta gave Rose a keepsake of Gittel's: the distinctive and unattractive Pfefferman family ring. They eventually arrived in Los Angeles and found Haim living with another woman. A few years later, Rose gave birth to a baby, a biological male, in spite of Rose's husband, Moshe's, prediction that she would have a girl.

==== Present day ====
At the beginning of Season 2, Maura and Shelly have loosely reentered into a relationship together; however, Maura ends the reunion, as she considers it to be unhealthy. The decision is devastating to Shelly, who feels she was never good enough. Maura's friendship with Davina also falls apart when she treats Davina's relationship with her boyfriend condescendingly.

Maura learns to embrace the mothering side of her through talking with her transgender friend Shea (Trace Lysette) about Shea's suicidal thoughts. This results in Maura deciding to spend time with her daughters; the women take an opportunity to go to Idlewild Womyn's Music Festival together. However, the festival, like the transvestite camp before, only allows "women-born women" to be part of the festivities. This leads to an uncomfortable conversation in which she is confronted over having male privilege and never being made to account for it. She is also taken to task by Leslie, who is still bitter over being blackballed by Maura and refers to her as "Mort". Maura is distraught and leaves the camp with Vicki (Anjelica Huston), a breast cancer survivor; they enter into a relationship. In the final episode, Maura decides to finally reunite with her estranged sister and mother, whose reaction to Ali's ring puzzles Maura.

=== Season 3 ===
==== Flashbacks ====
Flashbacks in the third season pick up Maura's family saga from the second season, now focusing on her somewhat strained childhood in the 1950s. Unable to express herself and perennially untalented at sports, Maura frequently dressed up in her mother's nightgown and jewelry and danced alone in the family bunker. By this point, Moshe has walked out on the family, and Haim is the dominant male figure in her life. Rose and Yetta were somewhat tolerant, provided that Maura confined her activities to the bunker. Things took a turn for the worse when Haim discovers the secret and screams at her in front of the whole family, revealing how Gittel had been killed in the Holocaust because of her gender identity. Brina shortly thereafter publicly denounced Maura in front of her friends at school, beginning their lifelong feud.

Flashbacks to the 1960s reveal that "Mort", in his early twenties, dated a young artist and even helped her with a gallery opening. It is implied they are engaged when she shows off a ring to attendants with Mort by her side. Mort, however, only had eyes for her best friend: Shelly. They embark on a secret affair; Mort told Shelly the engagement ring should be on her finger. During their affair, Mort asked Shelly if she can keep a secret, which is not revealed during the episode.

==== Present day ====
Maura continues to see Vicki, has rebuilt her relationship with Davina, and is volunteering at the LGBT center. She attempts to help out a young suicidal caller, but it leads to an ill-fated search that results in her collapsing. After a trip to the hospital for exhaustion, Maura announces at her 70th birthday that she wants to be called Mom rather than Moppa, which angers Shelly, and that she intends to undergo gender confirmation surgery, which distresses Vicki – Maura has neglected to mention it to either of them before publicly making the announcement.

During this time, Maura's relationship with her sister warms somewhat, but she is angered to see that it is only because their mother is fading away. Although Vicki and Brina get along very well, Maura perceives their bonding as coming at her expense, and she and Vicki break up after an explosive argument.

Maura eventually learns that she cannot undertake surgery safely due to heart issues, which leaves her devastated. She is left wondering if her transition is stalled, invalidated, or, perhaps most distressingly, complete.

=== Season 4 ===
==== Flashbacks ====
In the early 1980s, Mort struggles with identity issues and dressing as a woman, which is kept hidden from Shelly. Her therapist insists that she is gay, having no conception of transgender identity. Maura tries to find the courage to admit who she is, but when Ali is born with a severe breathing condition, Mort decides he must choose between Maura and Ali, and locks Maura away in a deal with God.

==== Present day ====
Maura has recently published a successful book on Jews and gender during the Cold War, and is invited to Israel to give a special lecture. Ali, seeking an escape from her troubles, goes with her. Whilst there, Maura discovers that her father, Moshe, is still alive. Their reunion is lukewarm, with Moshe having no reaction to Maura's transition, and explaining that he left because of Haim. Moshe offers to fly the rest of the Pfeffermans over to meet his own daughters. He also reveals the truth about Gittel, shocking Maura and Ali.

During the visit, Maura is somewhat uncomfortable around her newfound sisters (who seem to take her gender identity in stride) and feels like Moshe is avoiding talking about her transition. The Pfefferman kids descend into their usual antics, and Maura gives Ali, who had admitted her own feeling of gender nonconformity, permission to leave the group and visit friends in Ramallah. Maura eventually confronts Moshe, who makes ignorant statements about Maura's gender but ultimately offers neither closure nor condemnation. Shelly comforts her, and Maura reveals she is dating a man for the first time in her life. Later, Shelly reveals a long hidden secret to her entire family.

Upon her return to Los Angeles, Maura opens her home to Davina, who has been thrown out by Sal. The pair enlist Josh, Shelly, and Maura's boyfriend Donald to help evict a belligerent AirBnB guest from the Pfefferman house. Having mended fences with Shelly and Davina and entered a surprising new relationship, Maura begins to feel at peace.

=== Finale ===
Maura passes away offscreen in the series finale.

== Reception ==
=== Critical reception ===
The character of Maura Pfefferman and Jeffrey Tambor's performance as the character have received critical acclaim. John Doyle of the Canadian newspaper The Globe and Mail called Tambor "very, very fine", stating that "it is Tambor as Maura who anchors this exquisite dark comedy. Maura, the one character undergoing tremendous change and needing courage, is the calm one. There is such dignity and dry humour in Mort's revelations about his life, feelings and family, at the LGBT meetings he attends. There is such gossamer-like fragility to his new identity as Maura. It is to the great credit of... Tambor that there is nothing camp about Maura. She is this enormously lovable creation, a heroine you adore and fear for." Eric Thurm, reviewing the pilot o the series for The A.V. Club, called Maura the show's "new, furiously beating heart... It's tough to overpraise Jeffrey Tambor's work in the pilot—the weary softness in his voice ("Oh."), the slight shifts in the way he carries himself as Mort and as Maura, and the way we can immediately see a continuity between the two as distinct, but related expressions of the same person. As much as Maura's transition is the driving force of the show, she's a complex character even without that detail: empathetic, discovering her own strength in a support group-meeting and comfortably communicative, endlessly caring for her children and deeply appalled at the way they turned out. She's struggling to come to terms with her own identity, but in a different, more concrete way from her children." Matthew Gilbert of The Boston Globe wrote that Tambor "joins Lee Pace in Soldier's Girl and Tom Wilkinson in Normal in delivering one of TV's most sensitive and genuine trans turns by a non-trans man, quietly revealing the loneliness and longing at Maura's core."

=== Awards and nominations ===
==== Season 1 ====
Award	Date of Ceremony	Category	Result	Ref(s)
Golden Globe Awards	January 11, 2015	Best Actor in a Television Series – Musical or Comedy	Won	
GALECA Dorian Awards	January 20, 2015	TV Performance of the Year — Actor	Won	
Satellite Awards	February 15, 2015	Best Actor in a Television Series – Musical or Comedy	Won	
Critics' Choice Television Awards	May 31, 2015	Best Actor in a Comedy Series	Won	
TCA Awards	August 8, 2015	Individual Achievement in Comedy	Nominated	
Primetime Emmy Awards	September 20, 2015	Outstanding Lead Actor in a Comedy Series	Won	

==== Season 2 ====
Award	Date of Ceremony	Category	Result	Ref(s)
Golden Globe Award	January 10, 2016	Best Actor – Television Series Musical or Comedy	Nominated	
Critics' Choice Television Awards	January 17, 2016	Best Actor in a Comedy Series	Won	
Screen Actors Guild Award	January 30, 2016	Outstanding Performance by a Male Actor in a Comedy Series	Won	
Satellite Awards	February 21, 2016	Best Actor in a Television Series – Musical or Comedy	Won	
Primetime Emmy Awards	September 19, 2016	Outstanding Lead Actor in a Comedy Series	Won	
