= Transparent (TV series) =

American TV series (2014–2019)

- Genre: Comedy drama
- Created by: Joey Soloway
- Starring: Jeffrey Tambor; Gaby Hoffmann; Jay Duplass; Amy Landecker; Judith Light; Kathryn Hahn
- Country of origin: United States
- Original language: English
- No. of seasons: 5
- No. of episodes: 41 (list of episodes)

Production
- Executive producers: Joey Soloway; Andrea Sperling
- Producer: Victor Hsu
- Production location: Los Angeles
- Editors: Catherine Haight; Annette Davey; David Bertman; Hilda Rasula
- Camera setup: Jim Frohna
- Running time: 27–31 minutes (102 minute finale)
- Production companies: Topple; Picrow; Amazon Studios

Original release
- Network: Amazon Prime Video
- Release: February 6, 2014 – September 27, 2019

Transparent is an American comedy-drama television series created by Joey Soloway for Amazon Studios that debuted on February 6, 2014. The story revolves around a Los Angeles family, the Pfeffermans, and their lives after learning that their parent (Jeffrey Tambor) is a trans woman now going by the name Maura. Transparent's first season premiered in full on September 26, 2014, and its second season on December 11, 2015, third season on September 23, 2016, and fourth season on September 21, 2017.

Critical reviews were largely positive, though there were objections to the casting of Tambor, a cisgender man, in the role of a trans woman. At the 72nd Golden Globe Awards, the show won the Golden Globe Award for Best Television Series – Musical or Comedy, while Tambor won the Golden Globe Award for Best Actor in a Television Series – Musical or Comedy and the Primetime Emmy Award for Outstanding Lead Actor in a Comedy Series. This is the first show produced by Amazon Studios to win a major award and the first show produced by a streaming media service to win a Golden Globe for Best Series.

The series began airing on Sundance TV starting August 9, 2017.

In November 2017, Tambor was accused of sexual harassment on the set. On November 19, 2017, Tambor stated, "I don't see how I can return to Transparent" after a second sexual harassment allegation was made against him. He was officially fired from Transparent on February 15, 2018.

The Transparent: Musicale Finale addressed the death of Maura, and examined the lives of the Pfefferman family primarily from perspective of Maura's former spouse, Shelly (Judith Light), and through music. The Finale, featuring music and lyrics by Faith Soloway, was developed through a series of concerts at Joe's Pub and, in addition to the regular and recurring cast, featured performers Shakina Nayfack, Lesli Margherita, Erik Liberman, and Jo Lampert.

In 2023, the show was adapted into a stage musical, A Transparent Musical, for the Center Theatre Group in Los Angeles. The book was written by showrunner Joey Soloway and transgender playwright MJ Kaufman, with music and lyrics by Faith Soloway, Joey's sister. The production received mixed reviews.

== Cast and characters ==
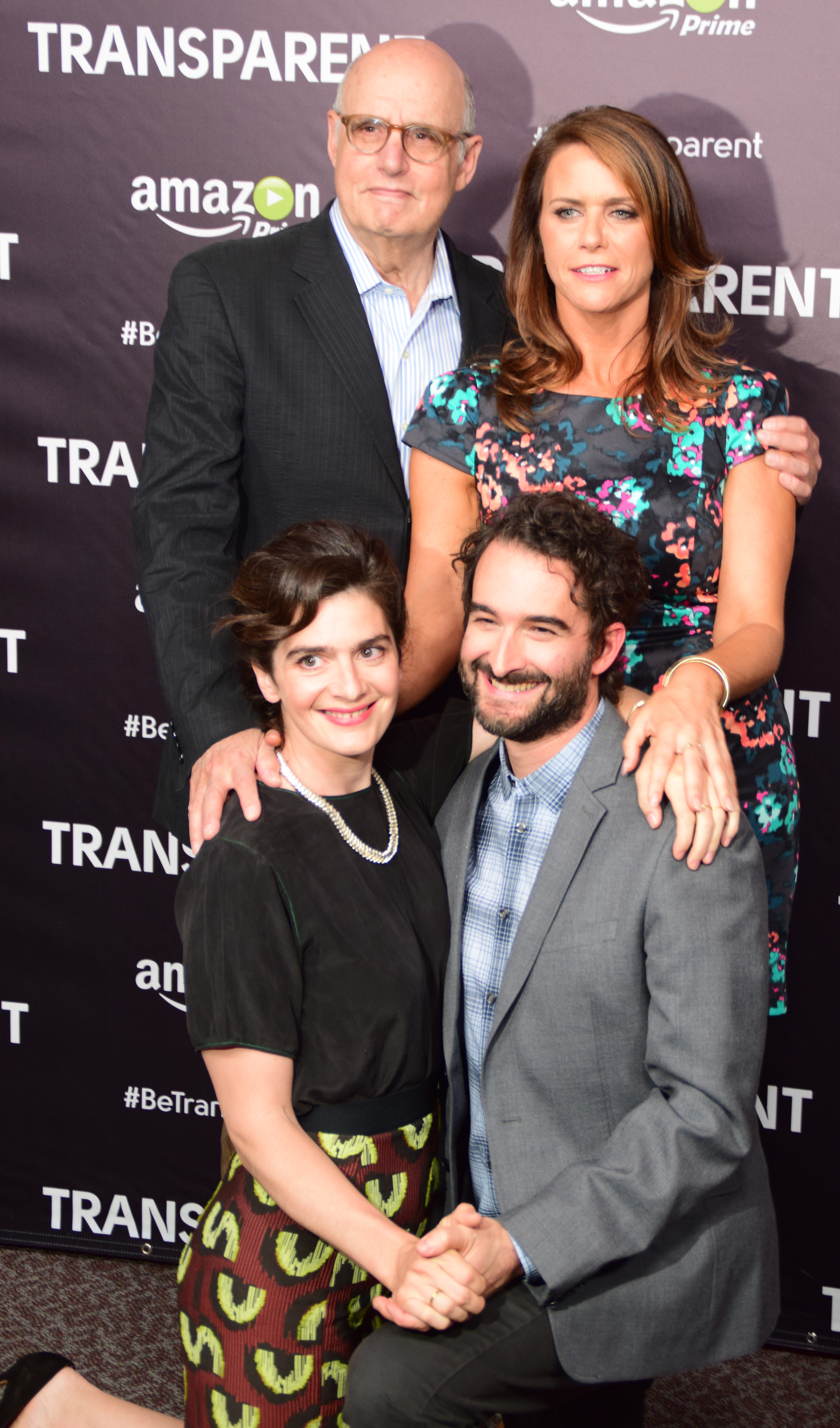
The cast of Transparent. Clockwise from top left: Jeffrey Tambor, Amy Landecker, Jay Duplass and Gaby Hoffmann

=== Overview ===
Character	Played by	Seasons				Film
Character	Played by	1	2	3	4	Musicale Finale
Main characters
Maura (née Morton "Mort") Pfefferman	Jeffrey Tambor	Main	Main	Main	Main	Stand-in
Sarah Pfefferman	Amy Landecker	Main	Main	Main	Main	Main
Josh Pfefferman	Jay Duplass	Main	Main	Main	Main	Main
Ari (né Ali) Pfefferman	Gaby Hoffmann	Main	Main	Main	Main	Main
Shelly Pfefferman	Judith Light	Main	Main	Main	Main	Main
Rabbi Raquel Fein	Kathryn Hahn	Recurring	Recurring	Main		Main
Davina Rejennae	Alexandra Billings	Recurring	Recurring	Recurring	Recurring	Main
Len Novak	Rob Huebel	Recurring	Recurring	Recurring	Recurring	Main
Ava	Shakina Nayfack					Main
Recurring characters
Ella Novak	Abby Ryder Fortson	Recurring				
Ella Novak	Julia Butters		Recurring	Recurring		
Ella Novak	Ashley Silverman				Recurring	Supporting
Marcy	Bradley Whitford	Recurring				
Magnus Hirschfeld	Bradley Whitford		Recurring			Supporting
Tammy Cashman	Melora Hardin	Recurring	Recurring			Supporting
Shea	Trace Lysette	Recurring	Recurring	Recurring	Guest	Supporting
Syd Feldman	Carrie Brownstein	Recurring	Recurring			
Bianca	Kiersey Clemons	Recurring	Recurring			
Zack Novak	Zackary Arthur	Recurring	Recurring	Recurring	Recurring	Supporting
Ed Paskowitz	Lawrence Pressman	Recurring				
Francis	Noah Harpster	Recurring	Recurring			Supporting
Rita Holt	Brett Paesel	Recurring	Recurring	Recurring	Recurring	
Young Ali	Emily Robinson	Recurring			Guest	
Young Rose	Emily Robinson		Recurring	Guest		Supporting
Barb	Tig Notaro	Recurring	Recurring			Supporting
Connie	Michaela Watkins	Guest				
Yetta	Michaela Watkins		Recurring	Guest		Supporting
Colton	Alex MacNicoll	Guest	Recurring	Recurring		Supporting
Dr. Steve	Jason Mantzoukas	Guest	Recurring		Guest	
Bryna	Jenny O'Hara		Recurring	Recurring	Recurring	Supporting
Leslie Mackinaw	Cherry Jones		Recurring	Recurring		Supporting
Lily	Lily Rubenstein		Recurring			
Vicki	Anjelica Huston		Recurring	Recurring		
Gittel (née Gershom)	Hari Nef		Recurring			
Sal	Ray Abruzzo		Recurring	Guest	Recurring	
Buzzy Rackless	Richard Masur		Recurring	Recurring		
Duvid Ovadia	Kobi Libii			Recurring		
Elizah Parks	Alexandra Grey			Guest		Supporting
Lila	Alia Shawkat				Recurring	Supporting
Moshe Pfefferman	Jerry Adler				Recurring	Supporting
Nitzan	Mark Ivanir				Recurring	

=== Main cast ===
- Jeffrey Tambor as Maura Pfefferman (Seasons 1–4), a retired college professor of political science at UCLA who finally opens up to her family about always identifying as a woman.
- Amy Landecker as Sarah Pfefferman, the oldest sibling. She is married and has two children. She leaves her husband for Tammy, a woman she fell in love with in college. She is initially the most accepting of Maura's transition. Kelsey Reinhardt portrays Sarah as a teenager.
- Jay Duplass as Josh Pfefferman, the middle sibling. A successful music producer who has troubled relationships with women. He seems to have a hard time accepting Maura's transition at first. Dalton Rich portrays Josh as a teenager.
- Gaby Hoffmann as Ali Pfefferman, the youngest sibling. She is perpetually unemployed and has a tendency to be immature for her age. Hoffmann also plays Maura's mother Rose in flashbacks. Emily Robinson portrays the younger version of both characters. In the series finale, Ali has come out as non-binary and changed their name to Ari.
- Judith Light as Shelly Pfefferman, Maura's ex-wife and the mother of Sarah, Josh, and Ali. She has been aware of Maura's desire to express her inner femininity for years.
- Kathryn Hahn as Rabbi Raquel Fein (recurring Seasons 1–2, main cast Season 3, Film), Josh's ex-fiancée and rabbi at the Pfeffermans' synagogue.

=== Recurring cast ===
- Melora Hardin as Tammy Cashman, Sarah's ex-flame
- Alexandra Billings as Davina, an educator at an LGBT center and Maura's best trans friend
- Trace Lysette as Shea, an educator at an LGBT center and one of Maura's friends
- Ray Abruzzo as Sal, Davina's boyfriend
- Carrie Brownstein as Syd Feldman, Ali's best friend with whom she begins a sexual relationship
- Kiersey Clemons as Bianca, Tammy's daughter from her first marriage
- Rob Huebel as Len Novak, Sarah's husband and father of Zack and Ella
- Zackary Arthur as Zack Novak, Sarah and Len's son
- Abby Ryder Fortson (Season 1), Julia Butters (Seasons 2–3), and Ashley Silverman (Season 4) as Ella Novak, Sarah and Len's daughter
- Lawrence Pressman as Ed Paskowitz, Shelly's second husband.
- Amin Joseph as Mike
- Noah Harpster as Francis
- Brett Paesel as Rita Holt, the Pfefferman kids' former babysitter and Josh's ex-flame
- Jenny O'Hara as Bryna, Maura's sister
- Alex MacNicoll as Colton, Josh and Rita's biological son
- Brett Rice as Pastor Gene, Colton's adoptive father
- Meagen Fay as Blossie, Colton's adoptive mother
- Cleo Anthony as Derek
- Deborah S. Craig as Kristin
- Sawyer Ever as Zack
- Bradley Whitford as Marcy (Season 1)/Magnus Hirschfeld (Season 2)
- Alison Sudol as Kaya, Josh's ex-girlfriend and ex-client
- Cherry Jones as Leslie Mackinaw, an academic with whom Ali wants to study
- Anjelica Huston as Vicki, a woman who forms a connection with Maura
- Hari Nef as Gittel (born Gershom), Maura's aunt who never made it out of Berlin
- Michael Stuhlbarg as Chaim, Maura's grandfather
- Michaela Watkins as Connie, the wife of a crossdresser (Season 1)/Yetta, Maura's grandmother (Seasons 2–3)
- Jason Mantzoukas as Dr. Steve, the Pfefferman kids' marijuana dispenser
- Tig Notaro as Barb, Tammy's second ex-wife
- Jiz Lee as Pony, a professional dominatrix
- Luzer Twersky as Mendel
- Alexandra Grey as Elizah Parks (Season 3)
- Richard Masur as Buzzy Rackless, a synagogue board member
- Kobi Libii as Duvid Ovadia, the cantor at the synagogue
- Sophie Giannamore as Young Maura
- Molly Bernard
- Lily Rubeinstein as Lily

== Episodes ==
Season	Episodes	Originally released	
Season	Episodes	First released	Last released
1	10	February 6, 2014	September 26, 2014
2	10	November 30, 2015	December 11, 2015
3	10	September 23, 2016	
4	10	September 21, 2017	
Film		September 27, 2019	

== Background ==
Soloway felt inspired to create Transparent after their parent came out as trans. They created the pilot for Amazon.com, which became available for free streaming and download on February 6, 2014 as part of Amazon's second pilot season. Amazon Studios picked up the pilot for Transparent in March, 2014, ordering a ten-episode season.

Tambor had previously portrayed transvestite judge Alan Wachtel on the police procedural television show Hill Street Blues in the 1980s. Soloway wrote Hoffmann's role after seeing his performance on Season 3 of Louis C.K.'s show Louie.

Transparent premiered all ten episodes simultaneously in late September 2014. In Canada, where Amazon's video streaming service was not available, the series premiered on the Shomi platform on January 23, 2015.

== Religious themes ==
The series depicts several Jewish characters and deals with spiritually and culturally Jewish themes. Joey Soloway, the series' primary creator, is Jewish and consulted Rabbi Susan Goldberg of Wilshire Boulevard Temple. They also sought advice from Rabbi Amichai Lau-Lavie of New York.

== Production ==
Soloway said that they hoped to use the series to explore ideas of gender identity through a "wounded parent being replaced by a blossoming femininity" and that they pictured Tambor as Maura when writing the character.

Soloway, the writers, and the cast developed, workshopped, and rehearsed both seasons with consulting producer Joan Scheckel at Joan Scheckel Filmmaking Labs.

As part of the making of the show, Soloway enacted a "transfirmative action program", whereby trans applicants were hired in preference to non-trans ones. Over eighty trans people worked on the show, including Zackary Drucker and Rhys Ernst, trans consultants and co-producers. Despite this, the main character Maura was played by Tambor, a man. In 2014, when the show debuted, Soloway defended their casting choice, citing Tambor’s “ability to embody a sort of very dignified feminine way of being.” However, in 2016, Soloway recanted this perspective, saying that casting a man as a trans woman is unacceptable and that no one should make the same casting decision again, citing such a decision as an "insult" to trans women.

In 2014, Our Lady J was chosen as the first openly trans person to be a writer for the show. All the bathrooms on set were gender-neutral.

The original pilot made available in February 2014 (with Gillian Vigman in the role of Tammy) was partly reshot after the series was approved.

On November 19, 2017, Tambor quit the show amidst sexual harassment allegations made against him.

== Reception ==
Critical response of Transparent
Season	Rotten Tomatoes	Metacritic
1	98% (59 reviews)	92 (29 reviews)
2	98% (42 reviews)	94 (28 reviews)
3	100% (38 reviews)	90 (15 reviews)
4	91% (22 reviews)	74 (10 reviews)
5	68% (25 reviews)	55 (13 reviews)

On Rotten Tomatoes it received an overall score of 91%, and an overall score of 85 on Metacritic.

=== Season 1 ===
On Rotten Tomatoes, the first season held an approval rating of 98% based on 59 reviews, with an average rating of 8.8/10. The site's consensus read: "As much about a change in television as it is about personal change, Transparent raises the bar for programming with sophistication and sincere dedication to the human journey, warts and all." On Metacritic, the first season received an average rating of 92 out of 100, based on 29 critics, indicating "universal acclaim".

Alan Sepinwall from HitFix named Transparent the best new show of the Fall 2014 season and Amazon's "most impressive volley yet". He added:

"... [The] show looks gorgeous and displays an instant command of both tone and this particular pocket of life in Los Angeles; Soloway is incredibly confident in introducing us to the parts of the show that are more universally relatable (a marriage gone sour, a disappointing child), knowing that we'll then follow her into more unfamiliar territory—not just with Maura, but the many disreputable behaviors her kids get tangled up in."

=== Season 2 ===
The second season held a 98% approval rating on Rotten Tomatoes based on 42 reviews, with an average rating of 9.2/10. The site's critical consensus read: "Transparent's second season ups its dramatic stakes while retaining the poignancy and humor that have made the series such a consistently entertaining example of the best that modern serial drama has to offer." On Metacritic, the second season received an average rating of 94 out of 100, based on 28 critics, indicating "universal acclaim".

=== Season 3 ===
The third season held a 100% approval rating on Rotten Tomatoes based on 38 reviews, with an average rating of 8.4/10. The site's critical consensus read, "Uniquely its own, and compelling and poignant as ever, Transparent continues to transcend the parameters of comedic and dramatic television with sustained excellence in its empathetic portrayal of the Pfefferman family." while Metacritic granted the season an average rating of 90 of 100, based on 15 critics, indicating "universal acclaim".

=== Season 4 ===
The fourth season held a 91% approval rating on Rotten Tomatoes based on 22 reviews, with an average rating of 7.9/10. The site's critical consensus read, "Transparent's fourth season forsakes tight narrative discipline for an absorbingly unwieldy continued exploration of the show's uniquely ambitious themes." while Metacritic granted the season an average rating of 74 of 100, based on 10 critics, indicating "generally favorable reviews".

=== Film ===
Transparent: Musicale Finale held a 68% approval rating on Rotten Tomatoes based on 25 reviews, with an average rating of 5.6/10. The site's critical consensus read, "Though it won't be for everyone, Transparent's singular musical finale grants its audience closure while giving its groundbreaking characters something they never expected: something resembling a happy ending" while Metacritic granted the finale an average rating of 55 of 100, based on 13 critics, indicating "mixed or average reviews".

=== Stage musical ===
Based on the series, A Transparent Musical was co-written by MJ Kaufman with Joey Soloway and Faith Soloway. It was debuted in 2023 by the Center Theatre Group.

== International broadcast ==
In Australia, the first two episodes of the series premiered on the Nine Network on January 27, 2015, and all subsequent episodes premiered on streaming service Stan upon its launch.

As Prime Video was not available in Canada at the time, the series launched on the Shomi platform.

== Awards ==
On December 11, 2014, the series was nominated for a Golden Globe Award in the category Best TV Comedy. On January 11, 2015, Transparent won two Golden Globe awards for the first season of the series. Tambor dedicated his win for Outstanding Lead Actor in a Comedy Series to the trans community, while Soloway dedicated their award to the memory of Leelah Alcorn.

== See also ==
- Normal (2003)
- Becoming Us (2015)
- List of transgender characters in film and television
