= Jeffrey Tambor =

American actor (born 1944)

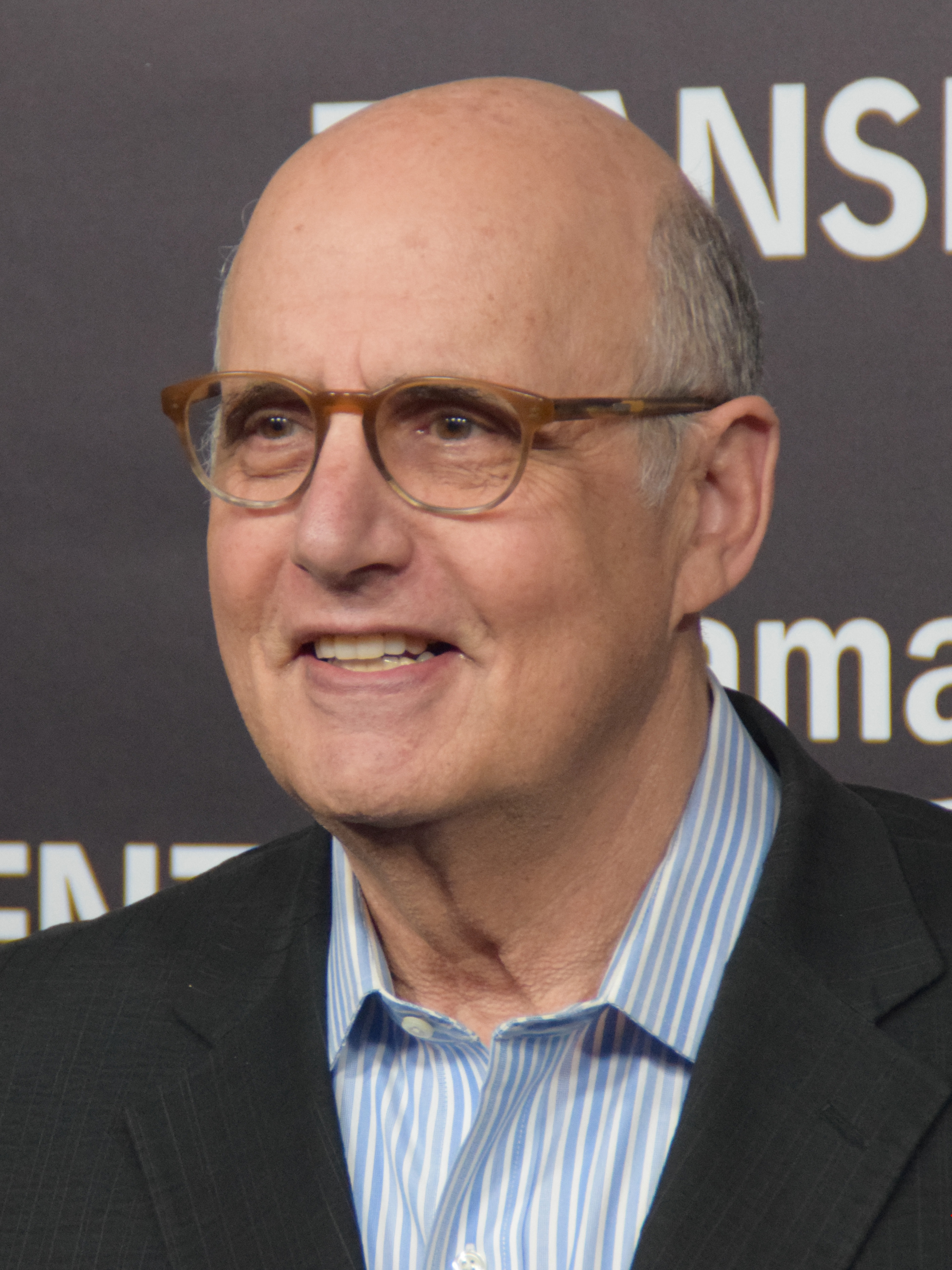
- Tambor in 2015
- Born: Jeffrey Michael Tambor; July 8, 1944 (age 82); San Francisco, California, U.S.
- Education: San Francisco State University; Wayne State University
- Occupation: Actor
- Years active: 1972–present
- Spouses: Katie Mitchell (m. 1991; div. 2000) Kasia Ostlun (m. 2001)
- Children: 5

Jeffrey Michael Tambor (born July 8, 1944) is an American actor. He is known for his television roles such as Jeffrey Brookes, the uptight neighbor of Stanley and Helen Roper in the television sitcom The Ropers (1979–1980), as Hank Kingsley on The Larry Sanders Show (1992–1998), George Bluth Sr. and Oscar Bluth on Arrested Development (2003–2006, 2013, 2018–2019) and Maura Pfefferman on Transparent (2014–2017). For his role in the latter, Tambor earned two Primetime Emmy Awards for Outstanding Lead Actor in a Comedy Series out of three nominations. In 2015, he was also awarded a Golden Globe for his portrayal of Pfefferman.

His film roles include Jay Porter in: ...And Justice for All (1979), Jinx Latham in Mr. Mom (1983), Sully in There's Something About Mary (1998), K. Edgar Singer in Muppets from Space (1999), Mayor Augustus May Who in How the Grinch Stole Christmas (2000), Tom Manning in Hellboy (2004) and its sequel Hellboy II: The Golden Army (2008), Sid Garner in The Hangover trilogy (2009–2013), Francis Silverberg in The Accountant (2016) and Georgy Malenkov in The Death of Stalin (2017).

Tambor has done voice acting for: The SpongeBob SquarePants Movie (2004), Monsters vs. Aliens (2009), Tangled (2010) and Trolls (2016). For his voice role in The Lionhearts (1998), he was nominated for a Daytime Emmy Award. From 2002 to 2003, he was an announcer for Hollywood Squares.

== Early life ==
Tambor was born on July 8, 1944, in San Francisco, California, the son of Eileen (née Salzberg), a homemaker, and Bernard Tambor, a flooring contractor. He grew up in a Conservative Jewish family with roots in Hungary and Ukraine. Tambor is a graduate of Abraham Lincoln High School and San Francisco State University, where he studied acting and then went on to receive a master's degree from Wayne State University.

== Career ==
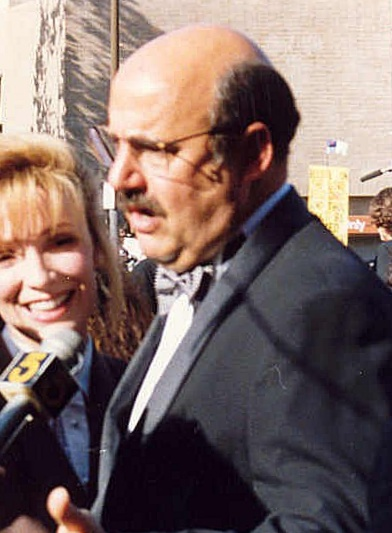
Tambor at the 1993 Emmy Awards

Tambor first moved to repertory theater in Milwaukee, later making his Broadway debut in the comedy Sly Fox (1976), appearing with George C. Scott and directed by Arthur Penn. He appeared in Measure for Measure in the same year. In 1979, he starred in Norman Jewison's ...And Justice For All, as a lawyer friend of the protagonist, Arthur Kirkland (Al Pacino). In an early TV job, an ad for Avis Rent a Car System, he was seen running through an airport, mocking O. J. Simpson's "Go, O.J., go!" ads for Hertz. On television, he made guest appearances on shows including Taxi, Kojak, M*A*S*H, The Golden Girls, and Three's Company. In 1979, he got his first role as a main character in television in the short-lived show The Ropers. Throughout the 1980s, he had a recurring role on Hill Street Blues playing a defense attorney who eventually becomes a judge. In 1981, he appeared in an episode of Barney Miller as a man who was trying to bring exposure to the members of the Trilateral Commission in charge of the coming New World Order. From 1987 to 1988, he was a cast member of the prime time ABC series Max Headroom as Murray, Edison Carter's editor and key producer. In 1990, he appeared in the music video for the Phil Collins song "I Wish It Would Rain Down".

Tambor played Hank Kingsley, the narcissistic sidekick of fictional talk show host Larry Sanders on The Larry Sanders Show (1992–1998). Tambor received four Emmy nominations for his performance on the show—all of which he would lose, to Michael Richards for Seinfeld, David Hyde Pierce for Frasier, and his co-star Rip Torn.

Beginning in 2003, Tambor starred in the television comedy Arrested Development as George Bluth Sr. and in some episodes as his twin brother Oscar Bluth. The show was cancelled in 2006, after three seasons, but a fourth season was released on Netflix in 2013. In 2004, Tambor received his fifth Emmy nomination for his work on the show. He lost to David Hyde Pierce for the final season of the sitcom Frasier. Tambor was nominated for a sixth time in 2005 but lost to Brad Garrett for the final season of Everybody Loves Raymond. The second episode of Arrested Development's third season lampooned this loss: Tambor's character's son describes his acting ability by saying, "It's a wonderful performance, Dad. You're a regular Brad Garrett."

Tambor was the announcer for the game show Hollywood Squares in 2002 and 2003. He was the voice of King Neptune in 2004's The SpongeBob SquarePants Movie. In the spring of 2005, he starred as George Aaronow in the Broadway revival of Glengarry Glen Ross alongside Alan Alda, Liev Schreiber, and Gordon Clapp. After the cancellation of Arrested Development in April 2006, Tambor signed on to a series with John Lithgow called Twenty Good Years about two men who ponder the preceding 20 years of their lives. The show premiered on NBC on October 11, 2006, but was taken off the air after only a few episodes. Also in 2006, he portrayed George Washington on The Radio Adventures of Dr. Floyd. He starred as "Uncle" Saul in the CBS comedy Welcome to The Captain until its cancellation in March 2008. He has made several cameo appearances on Entourage as a fictionalized version of himself who regularly annoys his agent, Ari Gold. For several years, based on his availability, Tambor has taught a class for actors. He was a longtime teaching associate of acting coach Milton Katselas.

In 2009, Tambor appeared in the animated film Monsters vs. Aliens and in the comedy The Hangover. In 2009, Tambor began playing the recurring character Len Trexler in the sardonic comedy Archer, an animated television series on the FX network. He is a major love interest to Malory Archer played by Jessica Walter – the two formerly playing husband and wife in Arrested Development. Tambor replaced Kelsey Grammer as Georges in the Broadway revival of the musical La Cage aux Folles on February 15, 2011, but withdrew from the production after the February 24 performance. Also in 2011, Tambor starred in an indie comedy, Lucky. That same year, he had a minor role in the film Paul with Simon Pegg and Nick Frost, reprised his Hangover role for its sequel, and was featured in Flypaper, with Patrick Dempsey and Ashley Judd.

In 2012, Tambor co-starred as Walt, Pete's aspiring musician father on the sitcom Bent starring Amanda Peet and David Walton. In May 2013 he returned to Arrested Development for season 4 and subsequently, season 5 in 2018–2019. In 2017 he played Georgy Malenkov in The Death of Stalin. In May 2017, Tambor released a book entitled Are You Anybody? A Memoir.

In February 2014, Amazon premiered its original series Transparent, which starred Tambor as Maura Pfefferman (born Morton Pfefferman), a divorced transgender Jewish parent of three. Tambor won the Golden Globe Award for Best Actor in a Television Series – Musical or Comedy for his portrayal and thanked the transgender community in his speech. He won the Primetime Emmy Award for Outstanding Lead Actor in a Comedy Series for his performance in season 1 of the show, his first win in 7 Primetime Emmy Award nominations. This made him the first actor to win an Emmy for portraying a transgender character. For the show's second season, Tambor again received positive reviews, as well as a nomination for the Golden Globe Award for Best Actor – Television Series Musical or Comedy, and wins for the Screen Actors Guild Award for Outstanding Performance by a Male Actor in a Comedy Series and the Critics' Choice Television Award for Best Actor in a Comedy Series. Following allegations of sexual harassment, Tambor said he would not return for the show's fifth season, which was later confirmed on February 15, 2018, when Amazon confirmed to Deadline that Tambor was not coming back and that the harassment investigation was recently concluded.

== Personal life ==
Tambor and his wife Kasia have a son Gabriel Kasper, born circa 2006, younger daughter Eve Julia, born circa 2007, and twin sons Hugo Bernard and Eli Nicholas, born October 2009. Tambor also has one adult daughter named Molly from an earlier relationship.

In 2007, Tambor was reported to be a Scientologist. In February 2008, he expressed concern about "Internet reports" about his alleged involvement with Scientology and stated that he "took some Scientology classes at one time, studied Scientology for a while, but no more. I have nothing against it, but I am no longer a Scientologist." In 2017, Tambor disclosed that he had left Scientology abruptly "when he was pressured to leave his second wife."

=== Sexual misconduct allegations ===
On November 8, 2017, Tambor was accused of sexual misconduct by his former assistant, Van Barnes. On November 16, 2017, actress Trace Lysette additionally made accusations against Tambor. Both of his accusers are transgender women, a fact which later influenced Tambor's decision to leave Transparent. Tambor responded: "I am deeply sorry if any action of mine was ever misinterpreted by anyone as being sexually aggressive or if I ever offended or hurt anyone. But the fact is, for all my flaws, I am not a predator and the idea that someone might see me in that way is more distressing than I can express." Days later, makeup artist Tamara Delbridge also accused Tambor of sexual improprieties on the set of the 2001 film Never Again. Tambor said he did not recall the incident, but apologized "for any discomfort or offense I may have inadvertently caused her."

By this time, Tambor had left Transparent, saying in a statement on November 19, "Playing Maura Pfefferman on Transparent has been one of the greatest privileges and creative experiences of my life. What has become clear over the past weeks, however, is that this is no longer the job I signed up for four years ago. I've already made clear my deep regret if any action of mine was ever misinterpreted by anyone as being aggressive, but the idea that I would deliberately harass anyone is simply and utterly untrue. Given the politicized atmosphere that seems to have afflicted our set, I don't see how I can return to Transparent." The allegations came after filming for the fifth season of Arrested Development had been completed that same month. Arrested Development's team supported Tambor in his defense against the allegations and his scenes remained within the show.

In his first interview after leaving Transparent, Tambor, speaking to The Hollywood Reporter in May 2018, continued to deny allegations that he had sexually harassed his former assistant or Trace Lysette on the series, but admitted to having anger issues throughout his life. He also said that while he was on the show he "worried [himself] to death" about whether he was portraying his transgender character truthfully, and that the stress sometimes made him "difficult" and "mean". Tambor mentioned one "blowup" he had with Arrested Development co-star Jessica Walter during the show's production.

On May 23, 2018, Walter said in a New York Times cast interview that Tambor had verbally harassed her. "He never crossed the line on our show with any, you know, sexual whatever. Verbally, yes, he harassed me, but he did apologize ... In like almost 60 years of working, I've never had anybody yell at me like that on a set." When asked whether she had reservations about working with Tambor again, Walter said: "Of course not.", "I don't want to walk around with anger", she added. "I respect him as an actor. We've known each other for years and years and years. Of course, I would work with him again in a heartbeat".

== Filmography ==
=== Film ===
Year	Title	Role	Notes
1972	The Summertime Killer	"Sully" Tambor	
1979	...And Justice for All	Jay Porter	
1981	Saturday the 14^{th}	Waldemar	
1982	The Dream Chasers	Jeffrey Bauman	
1983	The Man Who Wasn't There	Boris Potemkin	
1983	Mr. Mom	"Jinx" Latham	
1984	No Small Affair	Ken	
1985	Desert Hearts	Jerry	Uncredited
1987	Three O'Clock High	Mr. Rice	
1989	Brenda Starr	Vladimir	
1989	Lisa	Mr. Marks	
1990	Pastime	Peter LaPorte	
1991	Life Stinks	Vance Crasswell	
1991	City Slickers	Lou	
1992	Article 99	Dr. Leo Krutz	
1992	Crossing the Bridge	Uncle Alby	
1993	Living and Working in Space: The Countdown Has Begun	Dr. Stockton	
1993	A House in the Hills	Willie	
1994	Radioland Murders	Walt Whalen Jr.	
1995	Heavyweights	Maury Garner	
1996	Big Bully	Art Lundstrom	
1998	Dr. Dolittle	Dr. Fish	
1998	There's Something About Mary	"Sully"	
1998	Meet Joe Black	Quince	
1999	My Teacher's Wife	Jack Boomer	
1999	Muppets from Space	K. Edgar Singer	
1999	Teaching Mrs. Tingle	Coach Richard "Spanky" Wenchell	
1999	Girl, Interrupted	Dr. Melvin Potts	
2000	Pollock	Clement Greenberg	
2000	How the Grinch Stole Christmas	Mayor Augustus May Who	
2001	Never Again	Christopher	
2001	Get Well Soon	Mitchell	
2002	Branded		
2003	Scorched	Bank Employer	
2003	Malibu's Most Wanted	Dr. Feldman	
2003	My Boss's Daughter	Ken	
2003	Under the Tuscan Sun	Lawyer	Uncredited
2004	EuroTrip	Mr. Thomas, Scott's Dad	Uncredited
2004	Hellboy	Tom Manning	
2004	Funky Monkey	Coach Crane	
2004	The SpongeBob SquarePants Movie	King Neptune	Voice
2007	Super Sleuth Christmas Movie	Santa Claus	Voice, direct-to-video
2007	Slipstream	Geek / Jeffrey / Dr. Geekman	
2008	Superhero Movie	Dr. Whitby	
2008	Hellboy II: The Golden Army	Tom Manning	
2009	Monsters vs. Aliens	Carl Murphy	Voice
2009	The Hangover	Sid Garner	
2009	The Invention of Lying	Anthony James	
2010	Operation: Endgame	Devil	
2010	Tangled	Big Nose Thug	Voice
2010	Scooby-Doo! Abracadabra-Doo	Mr. Calvin Curdles	Voice, direct-to-video
2011	Win Win	Stephen Vigman	
2011	Flypaper	Gordon Blythe	
2011	Paul	Adam Shadowchild	
2011	Meeting Spencer	Harris Chapell	
2011	Lucky	Detective Waylon	
2011	The Hangover Part II	Sid Garner	Cameo
2011	Mr Popper's Penguins	Mr. Gremmins	
2012	For the Love of Money	Mr. Solomon	
2012	Branded	Bob Gibbons	
2013	The Hangover Part III	Sid Garner	Cameo
2014	The Clockwork Girl	Wilhelm the Tinkerer	Voice
2014	A Merry Friggin' Christmas	Snow Globe Snowman	Voice
2015	The D Train	Bill Shurmur	
2016	Trolls	King Peppy	Voice
2016	The Accountant	Francis Silverberg	
2017	55 Steps	Mort Cohen	
2017	The Death of Stalin	Georgy Malenkov	
2020	Magic Camp	Roy Preston	
TBA	The Adventures of Drunky	God	Voice; in production

=== Theatre ===
Year	Title	Role	Playwright	Venue
1976	Sly Fox	Sly's Servant	Larry Gelbart	Broadhurst Theatre, Broadway debut
2005	Glengarry Glen Ross	George Aaronow	David Mamet	Royale Theatre, Broadway
2010	La Cage Aux Folles	Georges (Replacement)	Harvey Fierstein	Longacre Theatre, Broadway

=== Television ===
Year	Title	Role	Notes
1977	Kojak	Medical Examiner	Episode: "Lady in the Squadroom"
1978	Starsky & Hutch	Randy	Episode: "Cover Girl"
1979	Taxi	Congressman Walter Griswald	Episode: "Elaine and the Lame Duck"
1979–1980	The Ropers	Jeffrey P. Brookes III	28 episodes
1980	Alcatraz: The Whole Shocking Story	Dankworth	Television film
1981–1983	The Love Boat	Mr. Rogers / Lawrence Jurgens	2 episodes
1981	Barney Miller	William Klein	Episode: "Field Associate"
1981	A Gun in the House	Lance Kessler	Television film
1981	The Star Maker	Harry Lanson	Television film
1981–1982	Three's Company	Winston Cromwell III; Dr. Tom Miller; Dr. Phillip Greene	3 episodes
1981–1987	Hill Street Blues	Judge Alan Wachtel	22 episodes
1982	Take Your Best Shot	Alden Pepper	Television film
1982	9 to 5	Franklin Hart	5 episodes
1982	M*A*S*H	Major Reddish	Episode: "Foreign Affairs"
1982	CBS Children's Mystery Theatre	Nick Alessio	Episode: "The Zertigo Diamond Caper"
1982	The Little Rascals	Additional Characters	Voice, episode: "Rascal's Revenge"
1983	Gloria	Dr. Webber	Episode: "Gloria on the Couch"
1983	Oh Madeline	Wesley	Episode: "Madeline Acts Forward at the Retreat"
1983	Cocaine: One Man's Seduction	Mort Broome	Television film
1983	Sadat	Sharaff	Television film
1983	The Awakening of Candra	Professor Michael Silver	Television film
1984	The Three Wishes of Billy Grier	Dr. Lindsay	Television film
1985	Robert Kennedy and His Times	Pierre Salinger	Episode: "Episode 1.1"
1985–1986	The Twilight Zone	Kyle Montgomery; Milton	Episode: "Dead Woman's Shoes"; Episode: "The World Next Door"
1986	Mr. Sunshine	Paul Stark	11 episodes
1986	Wildfire	Oberon	Voice, episode: "A Visit to Wonderland"
1986–1987	The New Adventures of Jonny Quest	Hard Rock	Voice, 5 episodes
1987	Max Headroom	Murray	14 episodes
1987	Popeye and Son	Additional Voices	Episode: "Junior Gets a Job/Surf Movie"
1988	Murder, She Wrote	Russell Armstrong	Episode: "Harbinger of Death"
1988	L.A. Law	Gordon Salt	3 episodes
1989	The Golden Girls	Dr. Stevens	Episode: "Sick and Tired: Part 1"
1989	Doogie Howser, M.D.	Hospital Board Member	Episode: "Every Dog Has His Doogie"
1989	Studio 5-B	Lionel Goodman	10 episodes
1990	Who's the Boss?	Fred / Ed Hartwall	Episode: "Tony Kills"
1990	Equal Justice	Harry Beeker	Episode: "The Art of the Possible"
1990	Tales from the Crypt	Charlie Marno	Episode: "Dead Right"
1990	Bill & Ted's Excellent Adventures	Additional Voices	Episode: "One Sweet and Sour Chinese Adventure to Go"
1990	American Dreamer	Joe Baines	17 episodes
1990	A Quiet Little Neighborhood, a Perfect Little Murder	Don Hecker	Television film
1991	Empty Nest	Dr. Binder	Episode: "The Dreyfuss Affair"
1992	The Burden of Proof	Sennett	Television film
1992	Batman: The Animated Series	Crocker	Voice, episode: "Appointment in Crime Alley"
1992	1775	Colonial Governor	Episode: "Pilot"
1992–1998	The Larry Sanders Show	Hank Kingsley	Main; 89 episodes
1993	Dinosaurs	Hank Hiber	Voice, episode: "Charlene and Her Amazing Humans"
1993	At Home with the Webbers	Gerald Webber	Television film
1993	Jonny's Golden Quest	Dr. Zin	Voice, Television special
1994	Another Midnight Run	Bernie Abbot	Television film
1995	Jonny Quest vs. The Cyber Insects	Dr. Zin	Voice, television special
1995	Pinky and the Brain	Beetle Fiero	Voice, episode: "Of Mouse and Man"
1996	The Twisted Tales of Felix the Cat	Oscar	Voice, episode: "Surreal Estate/Phony Phelix/Five Minute Meatball"
1996	The Real Adventures of Jonny Quest	Jack "Black Jack" Lee	Voice, episode: "The Darkest Fathoms"
1996	The Man Who Captured Eichmann	Isser Harel	Television film
1997	Weapons of Mass Distraction	Alan Blanchard	Television film
1997	Duckman	The Psychiatrist	Voice, episode: "Hamlet 2: This Time It's Personal"
1997	Johnny Bravo	Felinius	Voice, episode: "Hip Hop Flop/Talk to Me, Baby/Blanky Hanky Panky"
1997	Aaahh!!! Real Monsters	Jerry, Sanitation Worker	Voice, episode: "Laugh, Krumm, Laugh/Rookie Monsters"
1998	Hercules	King Salmoneus	Voice, episode: "Hercules and the King of Thessaly"
1998	The Lionhearts	Hank	Voice, 2 episodes
1999	Tracey Takes On...	Mobster	Episode: "America"
1999	Everything's Relative	Jake Gorelick	4 episodes
2001	The Practice	Sid Herman	2 episodes
2002	3-South	Dean Earhart	Voice, 2 episodes
2002	The Proud Family	Randolph Verascola	Voice, episode: "Romeo Must Wed"
2002	That Was Then	Gary "Double G" Glass	3 episodes
2002–2003	Ozzy & Drix	Mole	Voice, 3 episodes
2003	Eloise at the Plaza	Mr. Salomone	Television film
2003	Eloise at Christmastime	Mr. Salomone	Television film
2003–2019	Arrested Development	George Bluth Sr. / Oscar Bluth	Main; 82 episodes
2004	Game Over	Dr. Zed	Voice, 2 episodes
2005	The Muppets' Wizard of Oz	Wizard of Oz	Television film
2006	Twenty Good Years	Jeffrey	13 episodes
2007	Law & Order	Judge Barry Dilwynn	Episode: "The Family Hour"
2007–2015	WordGirl	Mr. Big / Mr. Birg / Various	Voice, 32 episodes
2008	Welcome to The Captain	Saul Fish	Voice, 5 episodes
2008	Good Behavior	Hy	Episode: "Pilot"
2008	The New Adventures of Old Christine	Neil	Episode: "Snakes on a Date"
2008	CSI: Crime Scene Investigation	Jerzy Skaggs	Episode: "Art Imitates Life"
2008–2009	Entourage	Himself	3 episodes
2009	Medium	Todd Emory / Allison Dubois	Episode: "The Main in the Mirror"
2009	Batman: The Brave and the Bold	Crazy Quilt	Voice, episode: "The Color of Revenge!"
2009	Monsters vs. Aliens: Mutant Pumpkins from Outer Space	Carl Murphy	Voice, television special
2009	Rex Is Not Your Lawyer	Dr. Barry Cohen	Episode: "Pilot"
2010–2017	Archer	Torvald Utne; Len Trexler	Voice, 11 episodes
2010	Scooby-Doo! Mystery Incorporated	Gill Littlefoot	Voice, episode: "The Grasp of the Gnome"
2011	Running Wilde	Mr. Wilde	Episode: "Basket Cases"
2011	Love Bites	Dr. O	Episode: "How To..."
2011	China, IL	Professor Cakes	Voice, 11 episodes
2011	The Trivial Pursuits of Arthur Banks	The Therapist	3 episodes
2011	Five	Danny Dinlear	Television film
2011	Night of the Living Carrots	Carl Murphy	Voice, Television special
2012	Bent	Walt Riggins	6 episodes
2012	The High Fructose Adventures of Annoying Orange	Mr. Orange	Voice, 2 episodes
2012	Next Caller	Jefferson Mingus	4 episodes
2012	Bob's Burgers	Captain Flarty	Voice, episode: "Mutiny on the Windbreaker"
2013–2014	Law & Order: Special Victims Unit	Lester Cohen	4 episodes
2013–2014	The Good Wife	Judge George Kluger	4 episodes
2013–2014	Raising Hope	Arnold	2 episodes
2013	Psych	Lloyd French	2 episodes
2013	Phil Spector	Bruce Cutler	Television film
2013	Onion News Empire	David Bryant	Pilot
2013	Sofia the First	Nigel	Voice, episode: "Baileywick's Day Off"
2013	Bubble Guppies	The Night Wizard	Voice, episode: "The Puppy and the Ring!"
2014–2017	Transparent	Maura Pfefferman	Main; 40 episodes
2014	The Millers	Ed Dolan	2 episodes
2014	Jennifer Falls	Don Hirsh	Episode: "Pilot"
2015–2018	Star vs. the Forces of Evil	Glossaryck	Voice, 21 episodes, replaced with Keith David
2015	W/ Bob & David	The Audiobook Narrator	Voice, episode: "Episode Four"
2015	Yo Gabba Gabba!	Mini King Tambor	Episode: Quest
2016	Cassius and Clay	(voice)	Pilot
2016	Brad Neely's Harg Nallin' Sclopio Peepio	The Audiobook Narrator	Voice, episode: "For Charlize"
2017	Tangled: Before Ever After	Big Nose	Voice, television film
2017	Tangled: The Series	Big Nose	Voice, 9 episodes
2017	The Orville	Bert Mercer	Episode: "Command Performance"

=== Video games ===
Year	Title	Role	Notes
2004	The SpongeBob SquarePants Movie	King Neptune	Voice
2009	Leisure Suit Larry: Box Office Bust	Larry Laffer	Voice

== Awards and nominations ==
Year	Association	Award	Project	Notes
1993	Primetime Emmy Awards	Outstanding Supporting Actor in a Comedy Series	The Larry Sanders Show	Nominated
1996	Primetime Emmy Awards	Outstanding Supporting Actor in a Comedy Series	The Larry Sanders Show	Nominated
1997	Primetime Emmy Awards	Outstanding Supporting Actor in a Comedy Series	The Larry Sanders Show	Nominated
1998	Primetime Emmy Awards	Outstanding Supporting Actor in a Comedy Series	The Larry Sanders Show	Nominated
2004	Primetime Emmy Awards	Outstanding Supporting Actor in a Comedy Series	Arrested Development	Nominated
2005	Primetime Emmy Awards	Outstanding Supporting Actor in a Comedy Series	Arrested Development	Nominated
2015	Primetime Emmy Awards	Outstanding Lead Actor in a Comedy Series	Transparent	Won
2016	Primetime Emmy Awards	Outstanding Lead Actor in a Comedy Series	Transparent	Won
2017	Primetime Emmy Awards	Outstanding Lead Actor in a Comedy Series	Transparent	Nominated
1999	Daytime Emmy Award	Outstanding Performer in an Animated Program	The Lionhearts	Nominated
2005	Screen Actors Guild Awards	Outstanding Ensemble in a Comedy Series	Arrested Development	Nominated
2006	Screen Actors Guild Awards	Outstanding Ensemble in a Comedy Series	Arrested Development	Nominated
2014	Screen Actors Guild Awards	Outstanding Ensemble in a Comedy Series	Arrested Development	Nominated
2016	Screen Actors Guild Awards	Outstanding Actor in a Comedy Series	Transparent	Won
2016	Screen Actors Guild Awards	Outstanding Ensemble in a Comedy Series	Transparent	Nominated
2017	Screen Actors Guild Awards	Outstanding Actor in a Comedy Series	Transparent	Nominated
2015	Golden Globe Awards	Best Actor - Television Series Musical or Comedy	Transparent	Won
2016	Golden Globe Awards	Best Actor - Television Series Musical or Comedy	Transparent	Nominated
2017	Golden Globe Awards	Best Actor - Television Series Musical or Comedy	Transparent	Nominated
2015	Critics' Choice Television Awards	Best Actor in a Comedy Series	Transparent	Won
2016	Critics' Choice Television Awards	Best Actor in a Comedy Series	Transparent	Won
2004	TCA Awards	Individual Achievement in Comedy	Arrested Development	Nominated
2015	TCA Awards	Individual Achievement in Comedy	Transparent	Nominated
