= Joe Klotz =

American film editor

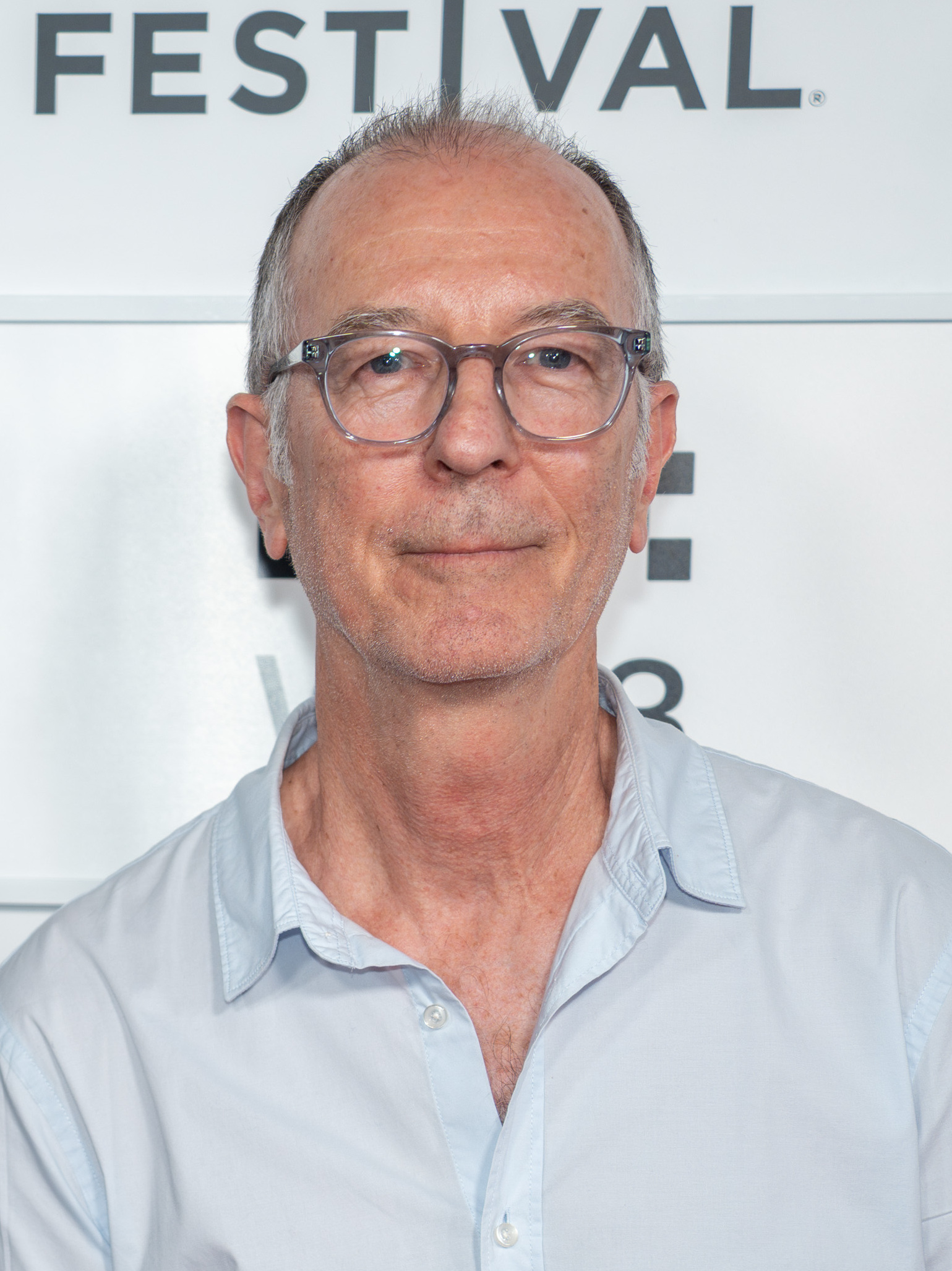
- Klotz at the 2025 Tribeca Festival
- Born: Joseph Klotz
- Education: Syracuse University
- Occupation: Film editor
- Years active: 1991-present

Joseph Klotz is an American film editor. He started his career as a television editor in New York City. Klotz' first feature film as editor, Let It Snow, won the Best Editing prize at the 1999 Festival of the American Film Institute. He was nominated for the 2009 Academy Award for Best Film Editing for Precious. Klotz has been selected for membership in the American Cinema Editors.

== Filmography ==
This filmography is based on the listings at the Internet Movie Database.

Year	Film	Director	Other notes
1991	Goo	Several	Video
1997	The Bert Fershners T.V. Special	John A. Ferraro	TV movie
1998	The Deep End	Jennifer Atkins	Short
1998	Dear Jesse	Tim Kirkman	Documentary
1998	Upright Citizens Brigade	Several	TV series (10 episodes)
1999	Let It Snow	Adam Marcus	American Film Institute - Best Editing
2003	Shelter Island	Geoffrey Schaaf	
2003	Chappelle's Show	Several	TV series (3 episodes)
2004	Down to the Bone	Debra Granik	Additional editor
2005	Junebug	Phil Morrison	
2005	Damage Control	Claudia Frank	TV series (1 episode)
2006	Marvelous	Síofra Campbell	
2007	Grace Is Gone	James C. Strouse	
2007	The Living Wake	Sol Tryon	
2008	Choke	Clark Gregg	
2008	A Bad Situationist	Sam Seder	Video
2009	Precious	Lee Daniels	Nominated - Academy Award for Best Editing
2009	The Winning Season	James C. Strouse	
2009	Taking Chances	Talmage Cooley	
2010	Rabbit Hole	John Cameron Mitchell	
2011	Violet & Daisy	Geoffrey S. Fletcher	
2011	The Art of Getting By	Gavin Wiesen	Consulting editor
2012	The Paperboy	Lee Daniels	
2012	Made in California	Sebastian Mattukat	Short
2012	Refuge	Síofra Campbell	Short
2013	The Butler	Lee Daniels	
2013	Deep Powder	Mo Ogrodnik	
2015	Stockholm, Pennsylvania	Nikole Beckwith	
2015	Happyish	John Cameron Mitchell	TV series (1 episode)
2015	Z: The Beginning of Everything	Tim Blake Nelson	TV series (1 episode)
2016	The Choice	Ross Katz	
2017	The Yellow Birds	Alexandre Moors	
2018	Monster	Anthony Mandler	
2018	Irreplaceable You	Stephanie Laing	
2018	To All the Boys I've Loved Before	Susan Johnson	
2019	Motherless Brooklyn	Edward Norton	
2022	Catherine Called Birdy	Lena Dunham	
2023	Day of the Fight	Jack Huston	
2025	Tow	Stephanie Laing	
2026	Rain Reign	Erika Burke Rossa	
