= Snow day (disambiguation) =

A snow day is a winter weather-related cancellation, due to excessive amounts of snow, ice, and/or other causes, such as at a school or place of employment.

Snow day may also refer to:

- Snow day (meteorology), a day when snow falls
- Snow Day (2000 film), a comedy film
- Snow Day (2022 film), a musical remake of the 2000 film of the same name
- "Snow Day" (Amphibia), an episode of Amphibia
- "Snow Day", an episode of CSI: NY
- "Snow Day", an episode of Rise of the Teenage Mutant Ninja Turtles
- "Snow Day", an episode of Zoboomafoo
- Snow Days, alternate title of Let It Snow (1999 film)
- South Park: Snow Day!, a 2024 video game
