= 5th Critics' Choice Television Awards =

- Date: May 31, 2015
- Location: The Beverly Hilton, Los Angeles
- Country: United States
- Presented by: Broadcast Television Journalists Association
- Hosted by: Cat Deeley

Highlights
- Most awards: Olive Kitteridge (3)
- Most nominations: Justified; Olive Kitteridge (5)
- Best Comedy Series: Silicon Valley
- Best Drama Series: The Americans
- Website: www.criticschoice.com

Television/radio coverage
- Network: A&E

The 5th Critics' Choice Television Awards ceremony, presented by the Broadcast Television Journalists Association (BTJA), honored the best in primetime television programming from June 1, 2014, to May 31, 2015, and was held on May 31, 2015, at The Beverly Hilton in Los Angeles, California. The ceremony was broadcast live on A&E.

The nominations were announced on May 6, 2015. Channelwise, HBO received a total of 27 nominations and FX came in second with 16. On May 13, 2015, Cat Deeley was announced as host. Seth MacFarlane received the Critics' Choice Louis XIII Genius Award.

== Winners and nominees ==
Winners are listed first and highlighted in boldface:

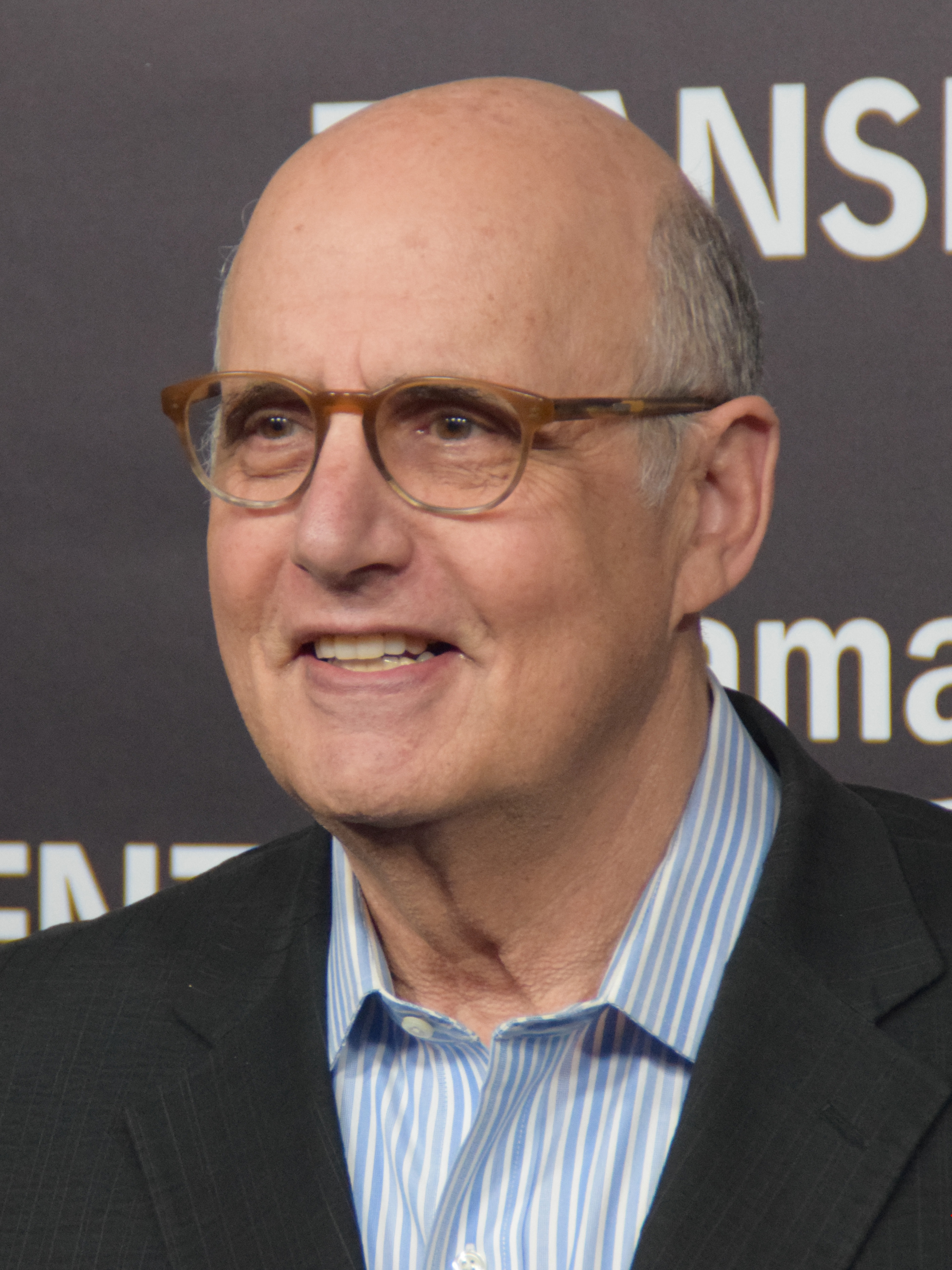
Jeffrey Tambor, Best Actor in a Comedy Series winner

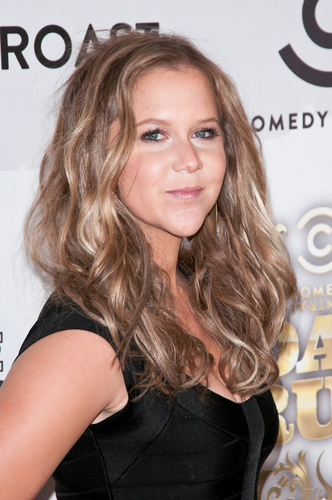
Amy Schumer, Best Actress in a Comedy Series winner

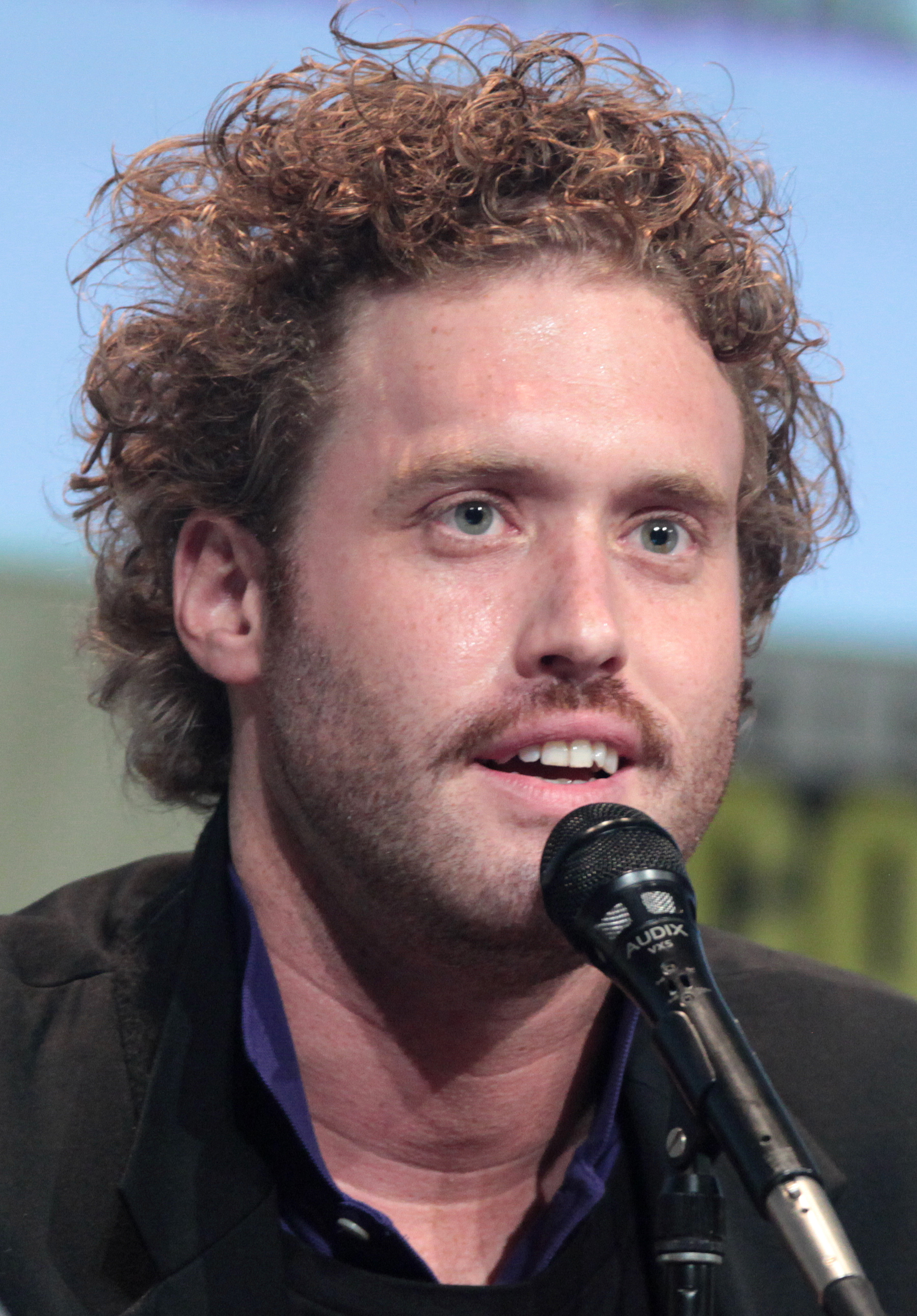
T.J. Miller, Best Supporting Actor in a Comedy Series winner

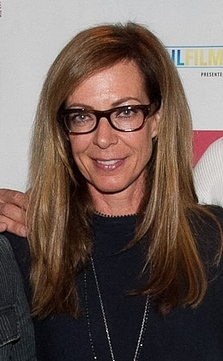
Allison Janney, Best Supporting Actress in a Comedy Series winner

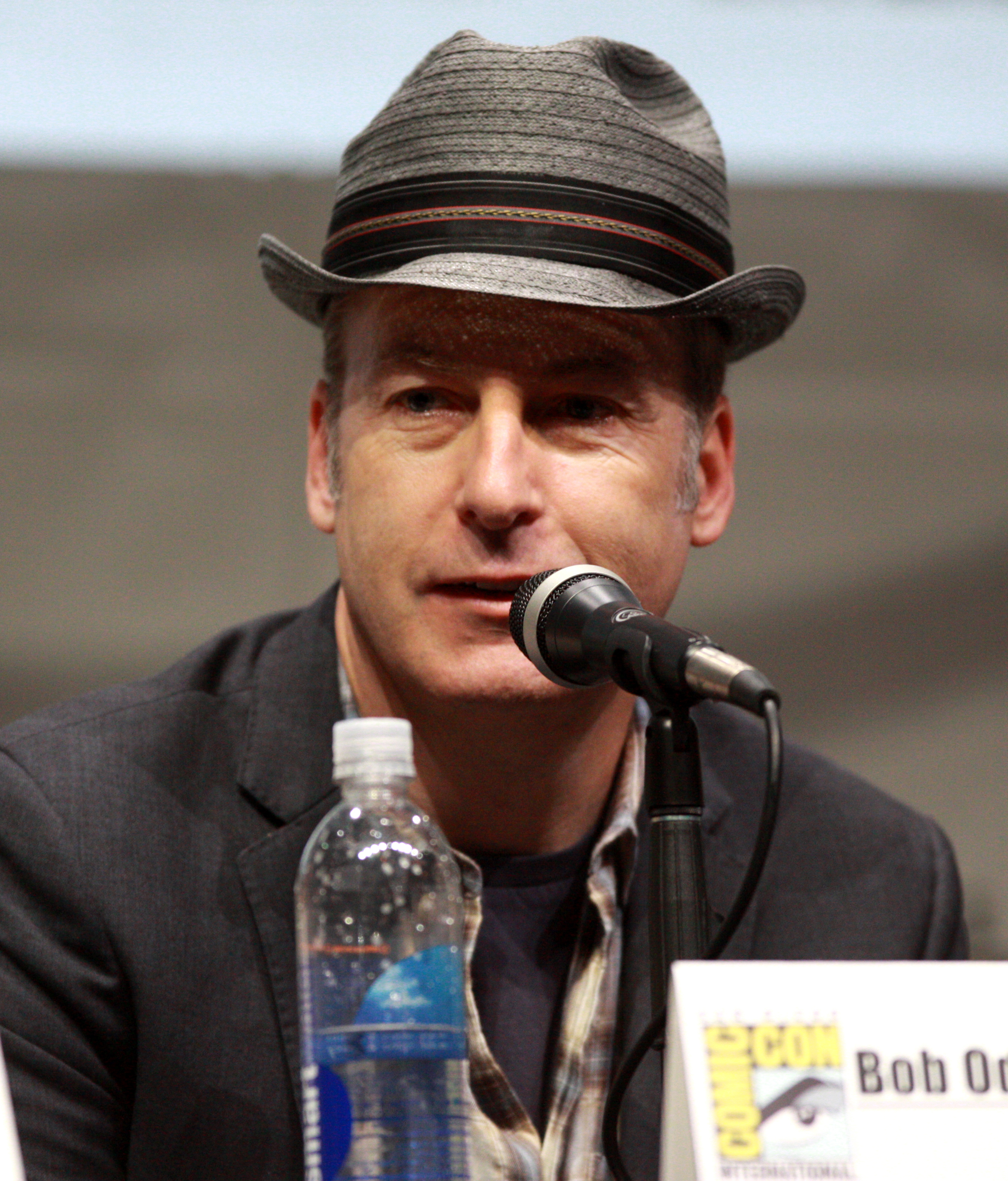
Bob Odenkirk, Best Actor in a Drama Series winner

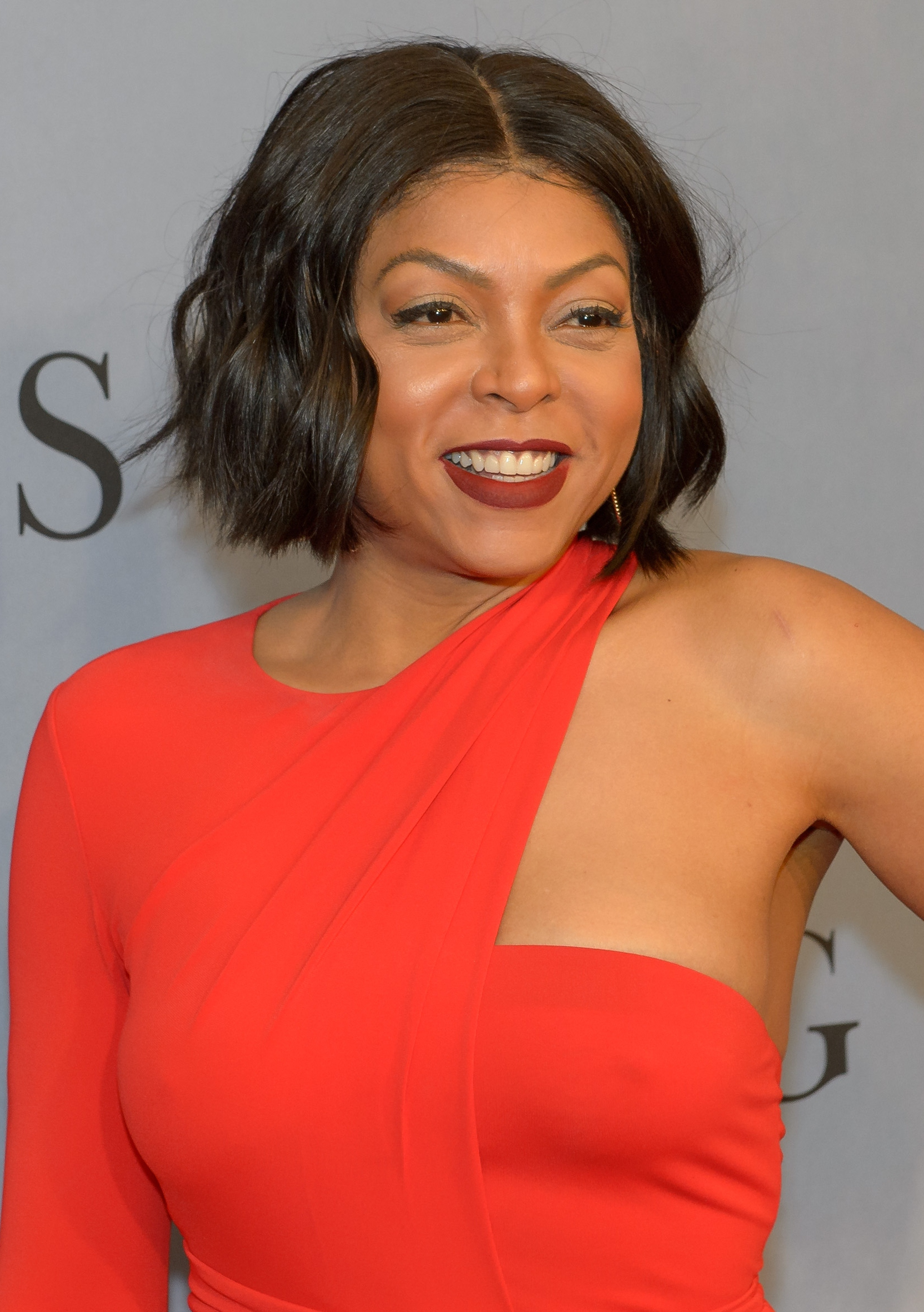
Taraji P. Henson, Best Actress in a Drama Series winner

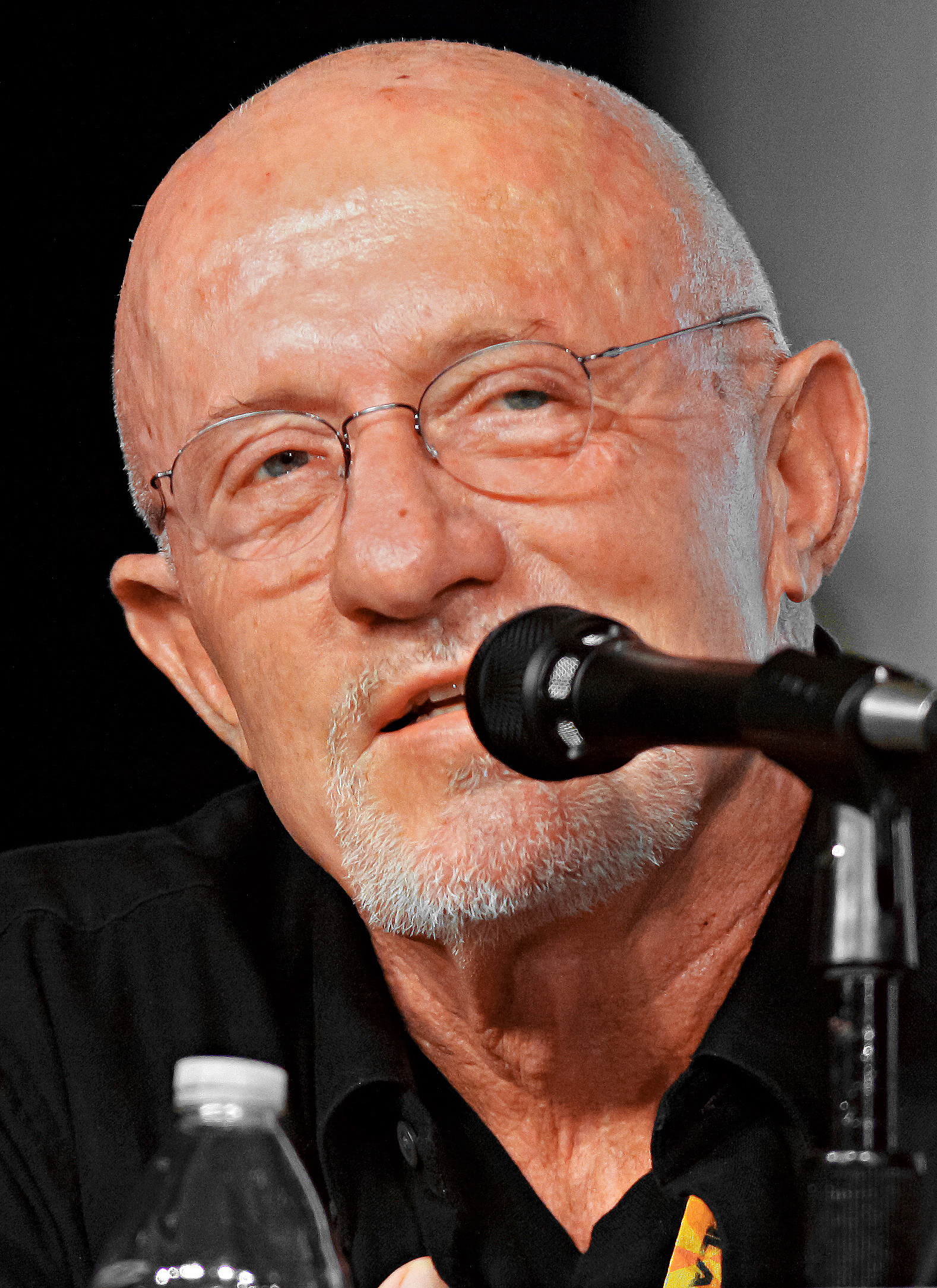
Jonathan Banks, Best Supporting Actor in a Drama Series winner

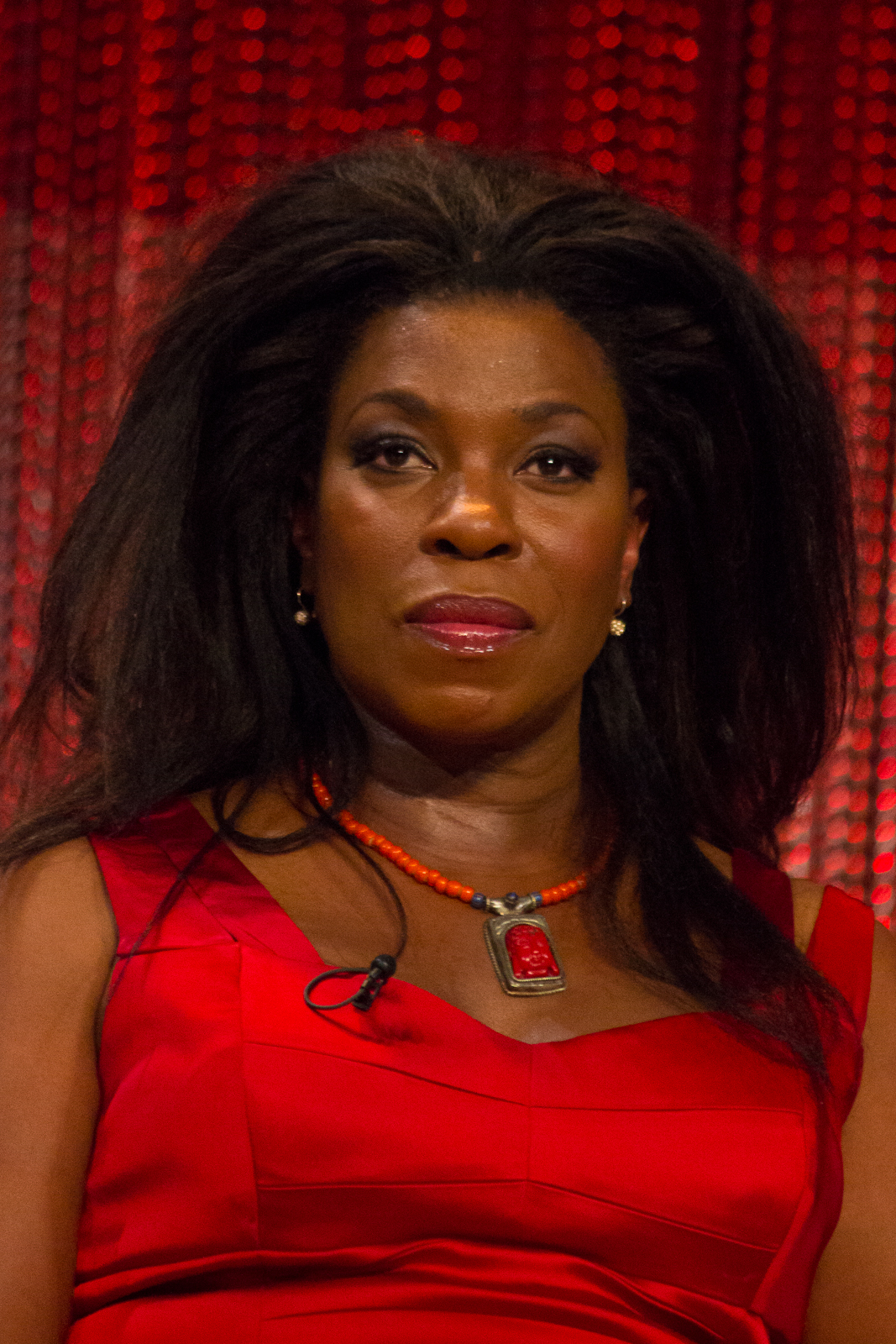
Lorraine Toussaint, Best Supporting Actress in a Drama Series winner

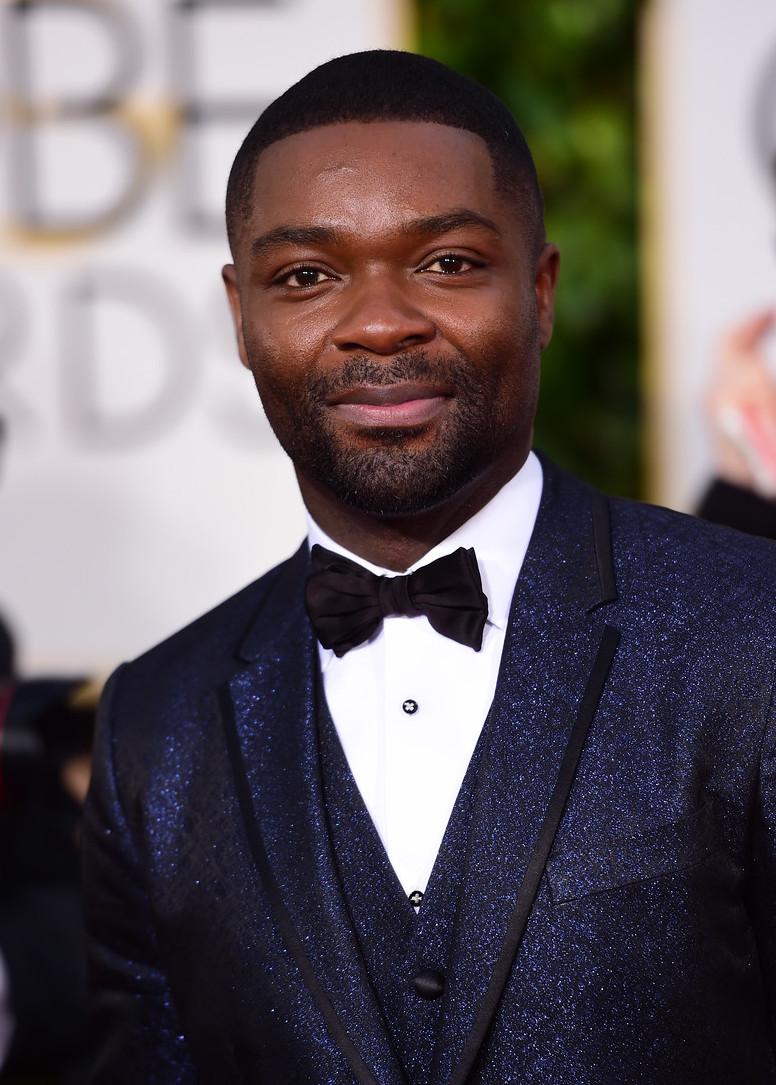
David Oyelowo, Best Actor in a Movie/Limited Series winner

Frances McDormand, Best Actress in a Movie/Limited Series winner

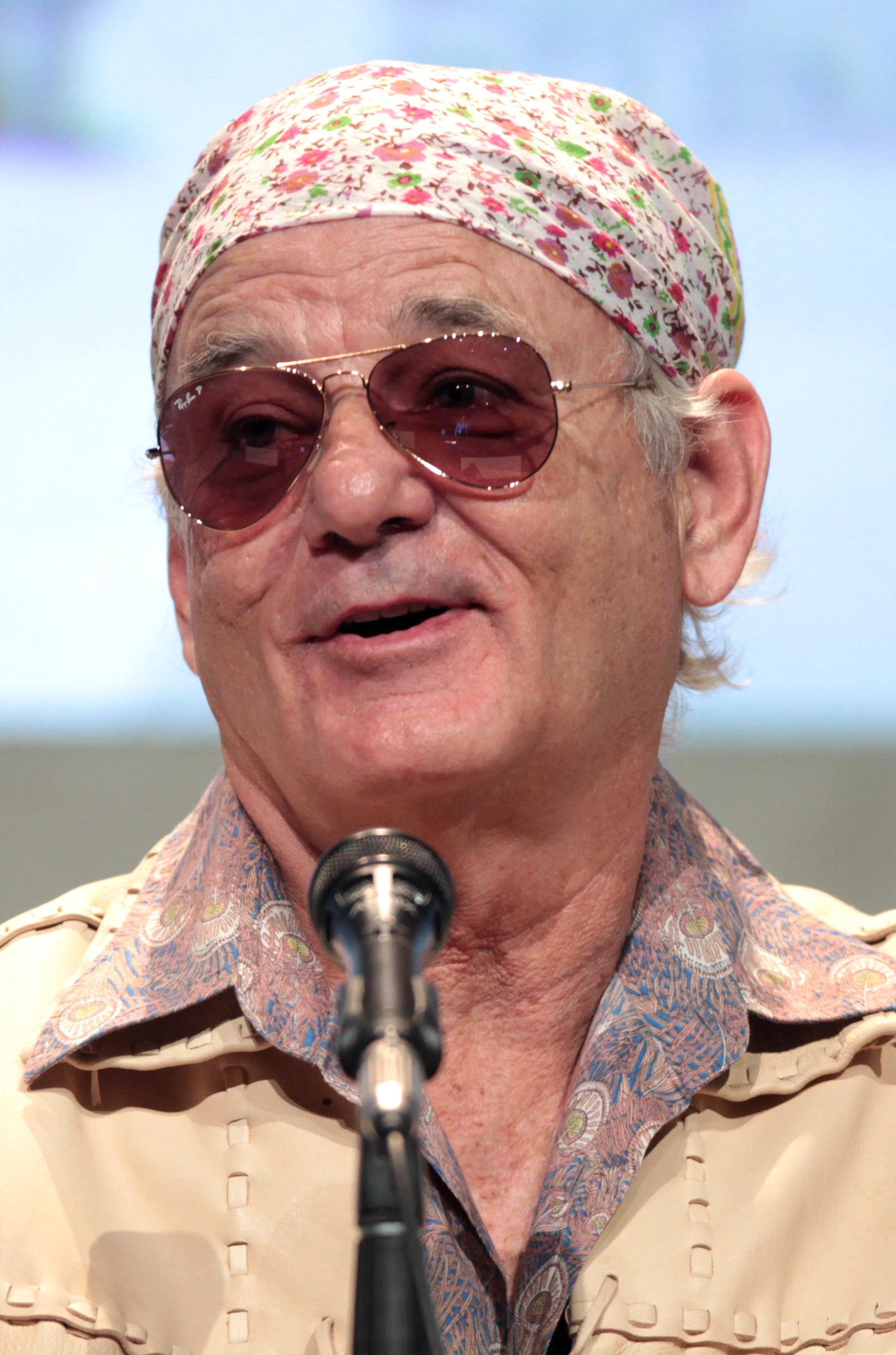
Bill Murray, Best Supporting Actor in a Movie/Limited Series winner

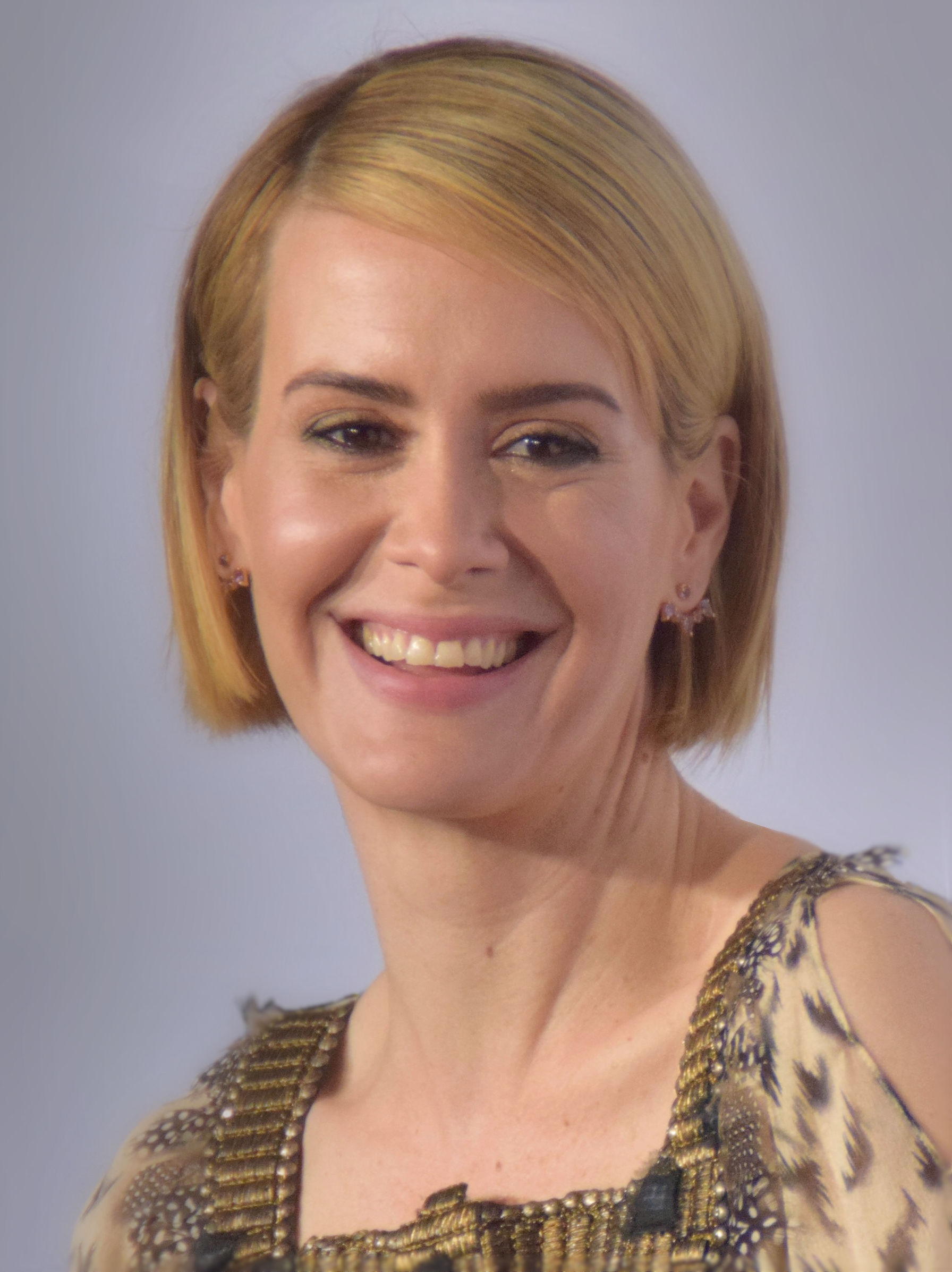
Sarah Paulson, Best Supporting Actress in a Movie/Limited Series winner

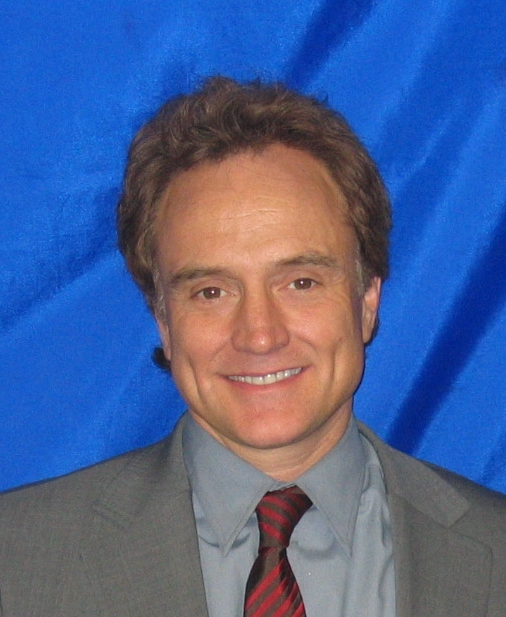
Bradley Whitford, Best Guest Performer in a Comedy Series winner

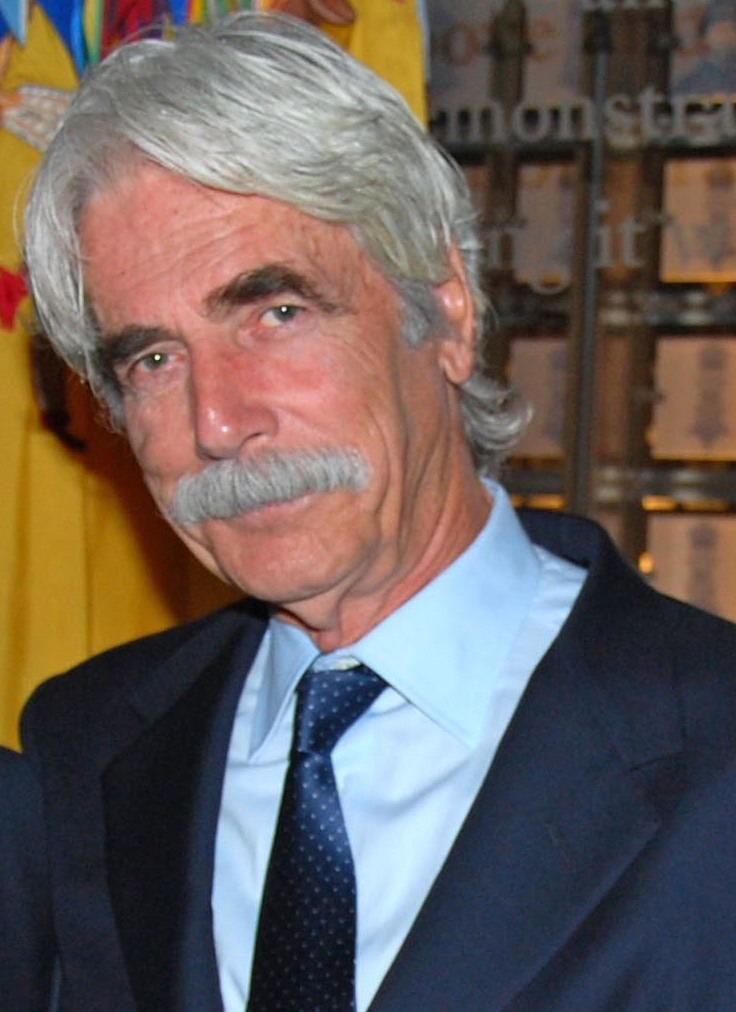
Sam Elliott, Best Guest Performer in a Drama Series winner

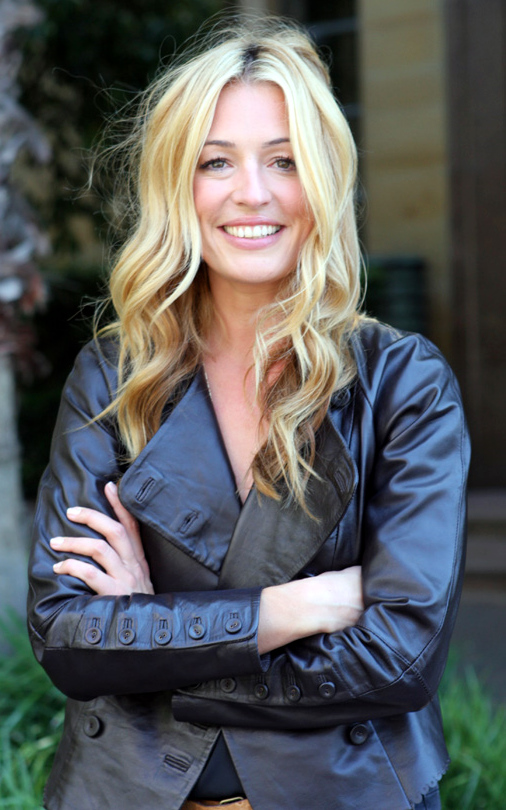
Cat Deeley, Best Reality Show Host winner

Best Series
Best Comedy Series	Best Drama Series
**Silicon Valley (HBO)**: Broad City (Comedy Central); Jane the Virgin (The CW); Mom (CBS); Transparent (Amazon Video); Veep (HBO); You're the Worst (FX)	**The Americans (FX)**: Empire (Fox); Game of Thrones (HBO); The Good Wife (CBS); Homeland (Showtime); Justified (FX); Orange Is the New Black (Netflix)
Best Movie	Best Limited Series
**Bessie (HBO)**: Killing Jesus (Nat Geo); Nightingale (HBO); A Poet in New York (BBC America); Stockholm, Pennsylvania (Lifetime)	**Olive Kitteridge (HBO)**: 24: Live Another Day (Fox); American Crime (ABC); The Book of Negroes (BET); The Honourable Woman (SundanceTV); Wolf Hall (PBS)
Best Animated Series	Most Exciting New Series (All Honored)
**Archer (FX)**: Family Guy (Fox); Phineas and Ferb (Disney Channel); Robot Chicken (Adult Swim); The Simpsons (Fox); South Park (Comedy Central)	American Crime Story (FX); Aquarius (NBC); Blindspot (NBC); Minority Report (Fox); The Muppets (ABC); Scream Queens (Fox); Supergirl (CBS); UnREAL (Lifetime)
Most Bingeworthy Show
**The Walking Dead (AMC)**: American Horror Story: Freak Show (FX); Empire (Fox); Game of Thrones (HBO); Orange Is the New Black (Netflix); Vikings (History)
Best Acting in a Comedy Series
Best Actor	Best Actress
**Jeffrey Tambor as Maura Pfefferman – Transparent**: Anthony Anderson as Andre "Dre" Johnson, Sr. – Black-ish; Will Forte as Phil Miller – The Last Man on Earth; Johnny Galecki as Dr. Leonard Hofstadter – The Big Bang Theory; Chris Messina as Dr. Danny Castellano – The Mindy Project; Thomas Middleditch as Richard Hendriks – Silicon Valley	**Amy Schumer as Various Characters – Inside Amy Schumer**: Ilana Glazer as Ilana Wexler – Broad City; Lisa Kudrow as Valerie Cherish – The Comeback; Julia Louis-Dreyfus as Selina Meyer – Veep; Gina Rodriguez as Jane Villanueva – Jane the Virgin; Constance Wu as Jessica Huang – Fresh Off the Boat
Best Supporting Actor	Best Supporting Actress
**T.J. Miller as Erlich Bachman – Silicon Valley**: Tituss Burgess as Titus Andromedon – Unbreakable Kimmy Schmidt; Jaime Camil as Rogelio de la Vega – Jane the Virgin; Adam Driver as Adam Sackler – Girls; Tony Hale as Gary Walsh – Veep; Cameron Monaghan as Ian Gallagher – Shameless	**Allison Janney as Bonnie Plunkett – Mom**: Mayim Bialik as Dr. Amy Farrah Fowler – The Big Bang Theory; Carrie Brownstein as Various Characters – Portlandia; Judith Light as Shelly Pfefferman – Transparent; Melanie Lynskey as Michelle Pierson – Togetherness; Eden Sher as Sue Heck – The Middle
Best Acting in a Drama Series
Best Actor	Best Actress
**Bob Odenkirk as Saul Goodman – Better Call Saul**: Freddie Highmore as Norman Bates – Bates Motel; Charlie Hunnam as Jax Teller – Sons of Anarchy; Timothy Olyphant as Raylan Givens – Justified; Matthew Rhys as Philip Jennings – The Americans; Aden Young as Daniel Holden – Rectify	**Taraji P. Henson as Cookie Lyon – Empire**: Viola Davis as Professor Annalise Keating, J.D. – How to Get Away with Murder; Vera Farmiga as Norma Bates – Bates Motel; Eva Green as Vanessa Ives – Penny Dreadful; Julianna Margulies as Alicia Florrick – The Good Wife; Keri Russell as Elizabeth Jennings – The Americans
Best Supporting Actor	Best Supporting Actress
**Jonathan Banks as Mike Ehrmantraut – Better Call Saul**: Christopher Eccleston as Matt Jamison – The Leftovers; Walton Goggins as Boyd Crowder – Justified; Ben Mendelsohn as Danny Rayburn – Bloodline; Craig T. Nelson as Zeek Braverman – Parenthood; Mandy Patinkin as Saul Berenson – Homeland	**Lorraine Toussaint as Yvonne "Vee" Parker – Orange Is the New Black**: Christine Baranski as Diane Lockhart – The Good Wife; Joelle Carter as Ava Crowder – Justified; Carrie Coon as Nora Durst – The Leftovers; Mae Whitman as Amber Holt – Parenthood; Katheryn Winnick as Lagertha – Vikings
Best Acting in a Movie/Limited Series
Best Actor	Best Actress
**David Oyelowo as Peter Snowden – Nightingale**: Michael Gambon as Howard Mollison – The Casual Vacancy; Richard Jenkins as Henry Kitteridge – Olive Kitteridge; James Nesbitt as Tony Hughes – The Missing; Mark Rylance as Thomas Cromwell – Wolf Hall; Kiefer Sutherland as Jack Bauer – 24: Live Another Day	**Frances McDormand as Olive Kitteridge – Olive Kitteridge**: Aunjanue Ellis as Aminata – The Book of Negroes; Maggie Gyllenhaal as Nessa Stein – The Honourable Woman; Felicity Huffman as Barbara "Barb" Hanlon – American Crime; Jessica Lange as Elsa Mars – American Horror Story: Freak Show; Queen Latifah as Bessie Smith – Bessie
Best Supporting Actor	Best Supporting Actress
**Bill Murray as Jack Kennison – Olive Kitteridge**: Jason Isaacs as Ben McKay – Stockholm, Pennsylvania; Elvis Nolasco as Carter Nix – American Crime; Jonathan Pryce as Thomas Wolsey – Wolf Hall; Cory Michael Smith as Kevin Coulson – Olive Kitteridge; Finn Wittrock as Dandy Mott – American Horror Story: Freak Show	**Sarah Paulson as Bette and Dot Tattler – American Horror Story: Freak Show**: Khandi Alexander as Viola – Bessie; Claire Foy as Anne Boleyn – Wolf Hall; Janet McTeer as Dame Julia Walsh – The Honourable Woman; Mo'Nique as Ma Rainey – Bessie; Cynthia Nixon as Marcy Owens – Stockholm, Pennsylvania
Best Guest Performing
Best Guest Performer – Comedy	Best Guest Performer – Drama
**Bradley Whitford as Marcy May – Transparent**: Becky Ann Baker as Loreen Horvath – Girls; Josh Charles as Coach – Inside Amy Schumer; Susie Essman as Bobbi Wexler – Broad City; Peter Gallagher as Larry Brown – Togetherness; Laurie Metcalf as Mary Cooper – The Big Bang Theory	**Sam Elliott as Avery Markham – Justified**: Walton Goggins as Venus Van Dam – Sons of Anarchy; Linda Lavin as Joy Grubeck – The Good Wife; Julianne Nicholson as Dr. Lillian DePaul – Masters of Sex; Lois Smith as Betty Turner – The Americans; Cicely Tyson as Ophelia Harkness – How to Get Away with Murder
Reality & Variety
Best Reality Series	Best Reality Series – Competition
**Shark Tank (ABC)**: Anthony Bourdain: Parts Unknown (CNN); Deadliest Catch (Discovery Channel); Married at First Sight (A&E); MythBusters (Discovery Channel); Undercover Boss (CBS)	**Face Off (Syfy)**: The Amazing Race (CBS); America's Got Talent (NBC); Dancing with the Stars (ABC); MasterChef Junior (Fox); The Voice (NBC)
Best Talk Show	Best Reality Show Host
**The Daily Show with Jon Stewart (Comedy Central)**: The Graham Norton Show (BBC America); Jimmy Kimmel Live! (ABC); Last Week Tonight with John Oliver (HBO); The Late Late Show with James Corden (CBS); The Tonight Show Starring Jimmy Fallon (NBC)	**Cat Deeley – So You Think You Can Dance**: Tom Bergeron – Dancing with the Stars; Anthony Bourdain – Anthony Bourdain: Parts Unknown; Phil Keoghan – The Amazing Race; James Lipton – Inside the Actors Studio; Betty White – Betty White's Off Their Rockers

== Shows with multiple wins ==
The following shows received multiple awards:

Series	Network	Category	Wins
Olive Kitteridge	HBO	Limited	3
Better Call Saul	AMC	Drama	2
Silicon Valley	HBO	Comedy	2
Transparent	Amazon Prime Video	Comedy	2

== Shows with multiple nominations ==
The following shows received multiple nominations:

Program	Network	Category	Nominations
Justified	FX	Drama	5
Olive Kitteridge	HBO	Limited	5
American Horror Story: Freak Show	FX	Limited	4
The Americans	FX	Drama	4
Bessie	HBO	Movie	4
The Good Wife	CBS	Drama	4
Transparent	Amazon Prime Video	Comedy	4
Wolf Hall	PBS	Limited	4
American Crime	ABC	Limited	3
The Big Bang Theory	CBS	Comedy	3
Broad City	Comedy Central	Comedy	3
Empire	Fox	Drama	3
The Honourable Woman	Sundance TV	Limited	3
Jane the Virgin	The CW	Comedy	3
Orange Is the New Black	Netflix	Drama (Note: Previously categorized as Comedy)	3
Silicon Valley	HBO	Comedy	3
Stockholm, Pennsylvania	Lifetime	Movie	3
Veep	HBO	Comedy	3
The Amazing Race	CBS	Reality – Competition	2
Anthony Bourdain: Parts Unknown	CNN	Reality	2
Bates Motel	A&E	Drama	2
Better Call Saul	AMC	Drama	2
The Book of Negroes	BET	Limited	2
Dancing with the Stars	ABC	Reality – Competition	2
Game of Thrones	HBO	Drama	2
Girls	HBO	Comedy	2
Homeland	Showtime	Drama	2
How to Get Away with Murder	ABC	Drama	2
Inside Amy Schumer	Comedy Central	Comedy	2
The Leftovers	HBO	Drama	2
Mom	CBS	Comedy	2
Nightingale	HBO	Movie	2
Parenthood	NBC	Drama	2
Sons of Anarchy	FX	Drama	2
Togetherness	HBO	Comedy	2
24: Live Another Day	Fox	Limited	2
Vikings	History	Drama	2

== Presenters ==
- Shiri Appleby
- Scott Bakula
- Chris Colfer
- Terry Crews
- Tracee Ellis Ross
- Anna Faris
- Johnny Galecki
- Max Greenfield
- Angie Harmon
- Josh Holloway
- Gillian Jacobs
- Allison Janney
- Jake Johnson
- Michael Mando
- Olivier Martinez
- Ben McKenzie
- Bob Odenkirk
- Sarah Paulson
- Bill Paxton
- Chelsea Peretti
- Timothy Simons
- Charlize Theron
- Matt Walsh
- Constance Zimmer
