= Adam Marcus (director) =

American filmmaker and actor (born 1968)

- Born: 1968 (age 57–58); Westport, Connecticut, United States
- Education: Staples High School; Tisch School of the Arts
- Occupations: Film director, writer, actor
- Years active: 1993–present
- Known for: Jason Goes to Hell: The Final Friday; Texas Chainsaw 3D
- Spouse: Debra Sullivan

Adam Marcus (born 1969) is an American film director, screenwriter, and actor.

== Early life and education ==
Marcus was born in Westport, Connecticut, and attended Staples High School. His brother, Kipp Marcus, is also an actor. He was raised in a Reform Judaism.

He studied film at the New York University Tisch School of the Arts, where he received the Best Picture Award at the 1990 Student Academy Awards for his short film So You Like This Girl.

== Career ==
In 1991, Marcus was hired by filmmaker Sean S. Cunningham to work on feature film production. He relocated to Los Angeles, where he co-produced My Boyfriend's Back (1993) for Cunningham and Disney. That same year, Marcus wrote the story for and directed Jason Goes to Hell: The Final Friday, the ninth installment in the Friday the 13th franchise, for New Line Cinema.

Working with his writing partner Debra Sullivan, Marcus developed screenplays for various studios, including Cradle and All (an adaptation of James Patterson’s Virgin) for Paramount Pictures, and Black Autumn for 20th Century Fox.

In 1995, Marcus founded Damn Skippy Theater Works, a theater company based in Los Angeles. In 1998, he directed the independently produced comedy Let It Snow (also known as Snow Days). The film was showcased at the Independent Feature Film Market (IFFM) in New York City and premiered in the New Visions category at the American Film Institute’s Los Angeles International Film Festival, where it received awards for Best New Writer and Best Editing. It was later selected for the 2000 Sundance Film Festival in the American Spectrum section. The film received coverage from outlets including Variety, The Hollywood Reporter, Ain't It Cool News, The New York Times, and The Gore Score.

In 2008, Marcus directed Conspiracy for Sony Pictures, a film he co-wrote with Sullivan. Shot in Santa Fe, New Mexico, the film starred Val Kilmer, Jennifer Esposito, and Gary Cole. In 2009, he appeared in the documentary film His Name Was Jason: 30 Years of Friday the 13th, where he provided commentary on the franchise.

In 2013, Marcus co-wrote Texas Chainsaw 3D, a direct sequel to The Texas Chain Saw Massacre (1974), along with Sullivan and Kirsten Elms. He also co-wrote Cabin Fever: Outbreak with Sullivan (a planned sequel to Cabin Fever: Patient Zero) and was involved in The Plantation, a project based on the 1943 film, I Walked with a Zombie. The same year, he appeared in the documentary film Crystal Lake Memories: The Complete History of Friday the 13th.

Marcus and Sullivan's screenplay Momentum (2015) entered production in South Africa in January 2014. Directed by Stephen Campanelli, the film starred Morgan Freeman, James Purefoy, and Olga Kurylenko. Momentum screened at several international film festivals, including the 2015 Fantasia International Film Festival.

== Filmography ==
Year	Title	Director	Writer	Producer
1993	Jason Goes To Hell: The Final Friday	Yes	Yes	No
1999	Let It Snow	Yes	No	No
2008	Conspiracy	Yes	Yes	No
2013	Texas Chainsaw 3D	No	Yes	No
2013	Fitz and Slade	Yes	No	Executive
2013	Drew Lynch: Did I Stutter?	Yes	No	Yes
2015	Momentum	No	Yes	Yes
2018	Secret Santa	Yes	Yes	Yes
2025	Hearts of Darkness: The Making of the Final Friday	No	Yes	Yes

== Sources ==
- Gorezone Magazine (USA) 1993, Iss. 26, pg. 9–12, +61, by: Marc Shapiro, "Starting Work on a Friday"
