= Momentum (2015 film) =

2015 film by Stephen Campanelli

- DVD cover
- Directed by: Stephen Campanelli
- Written by: Adam Marcus; Debra Sullivan
- Produced by: Donald A. Barton; Anton Ernst
- Starring: Olga Kurylenko; James Purefoy; Lee-Anne Summers; Hlomla Dandala; Morgan Freeman
- Cinematography: Glen MacPherson (Note: The cinematographer's surname is misspelled as "MachPherson" in the film.)
- Edited by: Doobie White
- Music by: Laurent Eyquem
- Production companies: Azari Media; Thaba Media
- Distributed by: GoDigital
- Release date: October 16, 2015
- Running time: 96 minutes
- Countries: South Africa; United States
- Language: English
- Budget: $20 million
- Box office: $789,406

Momentum is a 2015 action thriller film directed by Stephen Campanelli, and starring Olga Kurylenko, Morgan Freeman and James Purefoy. A high tech thief is pursued by mysterious government agents.

== Plot ==
Alex Faraday, a former CIA operative turned thief following a traumatic mission in Belarus, is recruited by her ex-partner Kevin Fuller for what he promises will be her final heist. Along with two other accomplices, Wayne and Raymond Kelly, they execute a high-tech robbery at a bank in Cape Town, South Africa. Dressed in futuristic suits with color-coded lights and voice modulators, the group tortures the bank manager to access the vault, which requires a full-body scan of the manager as the key. After knocking out two of his teeth and reinserting them to complete the scan, they succeed in opening the vault and steal a bag of diamonds from a specific safety deposit box, unknowingly also taking a USB flash drive hidden among them.

During the heist, tensions escalate when Wayne attempts to kill the hostages after Alex's mask is accidentally removed, exposing her identity. Alex refuses to murder the witnesses and kills Wayne instead. The remaining thieves escape in a van, where Alex subdues Ray after he blames her for Wayne's death. Alex and Kevin head to a luxury hotel to lay low, while Ray returns home. At the hotel, Alex bathes herself while watching the news stories unfold, realising that they have a close representation of her appearance. She then dresses into black lace lingerie and a tanktop before changing her colored contact lenses and dyeing her hair colour to green and brown, respectively. Kevin reveals he discovered something valuable on the flash drive amid the diamonds and hints at using it for leverage, but their reunion is interrupted by a knock at the door.

Jessica, a woman Kevin expected for a transaction involving incriminating material, arrives but is followed by a team of assassins led by the ruthless Mr. Washington. Alex hides under the bed as the assailants subdue Kevin and Jessica. Jessica hands over her phone, revealing a sex video of a woman (implied to be Jessica), thrusting atop an unknown man. Having deleted the video, Jessica is promptly executed. Washington tortures Kevin for the flash drive before killing him. Alex remains undetected, retrieves an unloaded gun, and escapes the hotel after a intense chase and shootout with Washington's team.

Pursued through the city streets, Alex evades both the assassins and local police. She then goes to Ray's apartment to warn him, but Washington's team arrives and kills Ray. Overhearing their plans, Alex learns they intend to target Kevin's wife, Penny, and son, Matthew. She calls Penny, urging her to flee with Kevin's "bug-out bag," which contains the diamonds and flash drive. Penny, resentful of Alex's affair with Kevin, initially refuses but prepares to leave after retrieving the bag from her garage ceiling, accidentally shattering her car's windshield in the process.

Washington's team races to the Fuller home, but Alex arrives first. Alex finds one of the assassins attempting to murder Matthew, leading to a fierce confrontation, resulting in his demise. During this, the other assassin attempts to sexually assault Penny in the kitchen, before Alex arrives and the two of them manage to prevail. Penny gives Alex the flash drive but keeps the diamonds (replacing them in the bag with windshield shards to deceive Washington). Attempting to view the drive on the home computer activates a tracking signal, forcing Alex, Penny, and Matthew to flee. Washington, meanwhile, receives orders from an anonymous U.S. Senator to recover the drive, with the Senator sending his aide, Frank Martin, for assistance.

Alex tracks Washington to an abandoned industrial site, subdues one of his henchmen, Mr. Jefferson, and attempts a trade. When refused, she executes Jefferson and detonates a bomb in Washington's vehicle, though he and his associate Ms. Clinton survive. Revealing her location in the open, Alex is knocked unconscious by a previously unknown third member of Washington's crew. Having forcefully regained consciousness through electric shock, Washington mockingly remarks at the fact that she was thoroughly strip-searched, resulting in her donning only a tank top and black knickers, exposed to the whims of the crew as they interrogate her for information. Captured and tortured with a vice on her leg, Alex endures interrogation where Washington deduces her CIA background. She agrees to a trade at Cape Town International Airport that evening. Before leaving, Washington stabs Alex in her left thigh to prevent any escape attempts, before ordering his henchman to dress her so she looks 'pretty'.

At the airport, Washington and a (now cane-bearing) Alex masquerade as a high-class couple, with him donning a suit (importantly, with the same tie), and her donning a revealing black dress. Alex's attire and lack of undergarments implies that the henchmen watched her undress to the point of (at least) bare-chestedness, as it is explained that they kept an eye on her at all times. This directly fuels Alex's vengeance, as she is now notably more aggressive and assertive in her behaviour, leading to the following events. Soon after, a disguised Penny meets Alex covertly, passing her a locker key. Alex retrieves a box rigged with a bomb in a hidden compartment containing the drive and fake diamonds. The explosion injures Clinton, sparking chaos involving airport security. Washington's remaining team captures Penny, but Alex rescues her, killing the captor. In the ensuing fight, Alex disarms Washington, retrieves the drive (hidden in his tie by Penny), and escapes. She yells "gun" to provoke police into shooting Washington dead.

Penny is briefly detained but released, taking most of the diamonds with her. Alex, with a new tech ally, boards a flight using a fake passport. Viewing the drive reveals plans for a false-flag bombing to incite war, benefiting the Senator politically and his defense contractors financially. Alex contacts the Senator's aide, warning she knows their scheme. In a closing discussion, the Senator vows to eliminate Alex, viewing her as a potential martyr.

== Cast ==
- Olga Kurylenko as Alexis "Alex" Faraday
- Colin Moss as Kevin Fuller
- Lee-Anne Summers as Penny Fuller
- James Purefoy as Mr. "Washington"
- Brendan Sean Murray as Raymond “Ray” Kelly (credited as Brendan Murray)
- Hlomla Dandala as Mr. "Madison"
- Morgan Freeman as "Senator"
- Karl Thaning as Doug MacArthur
- Shelley Nicole as Ms. "Clinton"

== Production ==
The film was directed by Stephen Campanelli in his directorial debut, and was written by Adam Marcus and Debra Sullivan. It was co-produced by Anton Ernst. The film was written as the entry point in a film series.

The film stars Olga Kurylenko as the protagonist "Alexis", James Purefoy as the antagonist "Mr. Washington", and Morgan Freeman as the U.S. senator. Vincent Cassel was originally to star opposite Kurylenko, but was replaced by Purefoy. Director Campanelli wanted to cast Purefoy based on his performance in the television series "The Following". Freeman offered his services to Campanelli for his directorial debut based on their prior working relationship, when he was a cameraman for Clint Eastwood.

The film had its world premiere at the 2015 Fantasia International Film Festival, on July 22, 2015, in Montreal, Quebec, Canada, the hometown of the director. The film was released in the United States on October 16, 2015.

== Reception ==
Momentum received generally negative reviews. On Rotten Tomatoes the film has an approval rating of 26% based on reviews from 31 critics, with an average score of 3.6/10. On Metacritic the film has a score of 18 out of 100 based on reviews from 6 critics, indicating "overwhelming dislike".

The Hollywood Reporter called it "a daft action flick" and "With one senseless set piece after another, the film's eponymous forward movement should carry it out of theaters quickly". Gary Goldstein of the Los Angeles Times wrote: "Momentum is a spectacularly generic action-thriller that, despite its sleekly shot and edited mayhem, lands with a giant thud."

During the film's opening weekend in the United Kingdom, the film only managed to gross £46 ($69) from the 10 theatres it was displayed in. In Russia it earned $250,000 in its opening weekend. In Malaysia, it grossed $60,126 over two weeks, and in Thailand, it grossed $43,940 on its opening weekend.
