= Kipp Marcus =

American actor, screenwriter, producer, and digital media executive

- Born: January 19, 1970 (age 56); Manhattan, New York, U.S.
- Occupations: Actor, screenwriter, producer, digital media executive
- Years active: 1984–present
- Spouse(s): Alice Dylan (2003–present; 2 children)

Kipp Marcus (born January 19, 1970) is an American actor, screenwriter, producer, and digital media executive. He is best known for his role as the oldest brother Kip Cleaver on the revival television series The New Leave It To Beaver. He has also received critical acclaim for his screenwriting and acting in the film Let It Snow.

== Early life ==
Kipp Marcus was born in Manhattan, New York, to parents Wayne and Susan Marcus. His relatives had artistic interests: Marcus' great-grandfather was in vaudeville, his grandmother and mother were singers, his father is an abstract painter, an uncle was a filmmaker and another an actor, and his older brother Adam Marcus is a film director. His family is Jewish. Marcus was committed to producing theatre from a young age, and directed and acted in many theatrical productions during his school years, winning the Young Playwrights of New England Award for Best Play at the age of 16.

== Education ==
Marcus studied acting at NYU's Tisch School for the Arts from 1989 to 1992 and graduated with a BFA degree. In 1991, he was invited to train at the Maly Theater in Moscow as a student with Circle In The Square Theater in New York.

== Career ==
=== Acting ===
Kipp Marcus began his professional acting career in 1984 at the age of 14 in the Broadway production of Lionel Bart's Oliver! as a Workhouse boy and in Fagin's gang.

In that same year, Marcus appeared in the role of Kip Cleaver, the eldest son of the adult Theodore "Beaver" Cleaver, in the television sitcom The New Leave It To Beaver, Marcus' role was one of the central characters on the show, he appeared in over 100 episodes during 1984–1989.

Marcus had his first film role in the 1992 Sundance Film Festival cult comedy "Aisle Six", directed by David Wain.

A year later, in 1993, Marcus was featured in the horror franchise Friday the 13th when he played the role of Officer Randy Parker in the New Line Cinema film Jason Goes to Hell, directed by his brother, Adam Marcus.

Marcus returned to Broadway in 1995 in the roles of Marius, Jean-Prouvaire and Joly in the musical Les Misérables. He performed in the musical for 800 performances, including the 10th Anniversary production in 1997, under the direction of Royal Shakespeare Company's Trevor Nunn and John Caird.

In 1999, Marcus appeared as the male lead James Ellis in the movie Let It Snow, which he also wrote and produced.

=== Screenwriting and producing ===
While Marcus was studying at NYU, he wrote and produced the comedy So you like this girl, which received Tisch School's Best Picture award in 1990.

In 1999, Marcus wrote and produced the comedy Let It Snow. His screenwriting won him a Best New Writer Award from the American Film Institute at the Los Angeles Film Festival in 1999, as well as producing honors at the Deauville International Film Festival, where it was nominated for best film and was an official selection at the Sundance International Film Festival in 2000. The movie was distributed in the United States, Europe and Asia and received favorable reviews.

During 2000–2003 Marcus wrote television pilots for Imagine Entertainment, Warner Bros, Fox and NBC.

More recently, Marcus wrote a screenplay about Buster Keaton.

== Filmography ==
=== Film and television acting ===
- The New Leave It to Beaver (1984-1989) - Kip Cleaver
- Aisle Six (1991) - Brad
- Politically Incorrect (1993)
- Jason Goes to Hell: The Final Friday (1993) - Officer Randy Parker
- The Cosby Mysteries (1994) - Photographer
- Let It Snow (1999) - James Ellis

=== Film and television writing ===
- So you like this girl? (1990)
- Let It Snow (1999)
- All of Us (2003)

=== Producing ===
- So you like this girl? (1990)
- Let It Snow (1999)

=== Broadway ===
- Oliver! (1984)
- Les Misérables (1995–1997)

== Awards ==
- Young Playwrights of New England award for Best Play, 1987
- Nomination for Best Young Actor Award in a Cable Series or Special category, 1988
- Nomination for Best Young Actor Award in Cable Family Series, 1989
- Best Picture, Best Cinematography and Acting Ensemble awards for "So you like this girl", NYU Tisch School for the Arts, 1989
- Best New Writer award for the movie Let It Snow, AFI's Los Angeles Film Festival, 1999
