= Society of Camera Operators =

The Society of Camera Operators (SOC) was founded in 1979 under the name Society of Operating Cameramen. Its primary mission is to advance the art, craft and creative contribution of the camera operator in the motion picture and television industries. The SOC represents camera operators, camera assistants, directors of photography as well as other related crafts. Its roster boasts of a global membership representing a large cultural diversity within the technical moviemaking crafts.

The SOC also publishes the four-times annually Operating Cameraman Magazine, founded in 1991 and renamed the Camera Operator Magazine in 2007. Written from the perspective of the camera operator, each issue deals with issues relevant to the world-wide motion picture and TV industry. It includes articles on the development of the motion picture camera (from the silent era through modern equipment), aspect ratios, set etiquette, the digital revolution, and other informational subjects. Camera Operator magazine contains articles written by members who describe current motion pictures and television shows they have been working on—a true representation of the experiences of camera operators on the sets and on location.

The organization hosts an annual banquet, The SOC Lifetime Achievement Awards, to honor those members who have contributed and advanced the craft of the camera operator. A portion of the proceeds from this event are donated to the Eye Care Clinic Vision Center of the Children's Hospital Los Angeles.

Renamed the Society of Camera Operators, more befitting its diverse membership of all genders, the society's motto "We See It First!" is a descriptive slogan referring to the fact that the camera operator, by personally viewing the scene through the viewfinder of a motion picture camera, physically sees the scene prior to anyone else until the screened dailies. "As camera operators we see the EXACT angles that audiences will see onscreen, and not from monitors placed around the set showing the 'representation' of what the camera operator sees and experiences." (Michael Frediani, SOC past president)

== Camera Operator of the Year – Film ==
The Society of Camera Operators for Camera Operator of the Year – Film is an annual award given by the society to camera operators for their outstanding achievements in field of filmmaking in a given year. The award was first given out in 2008 and, aside from 2011, has presented every year since, for film achievements from the previous year.

=== 2000s ===
| Year | Winners/nominees | Film |
|---|---|---|
2007
| 2007 | Jacques Jouffret | Into the Wild |
| 2007 | Colin Anderson | There Will Be Blood |
| 2007 | David Luckenbach | 3:10 to Yuma |
| 2007 | Jim McConkey | The Kite Runner |
| 2007 | Scott Sakamoto | Michael Clayton |
2008
| 2008 | Robert Gorelick | The Dark Knight |
| 2008 | Will Arnot | Milk |
| 2008 | Stephen Campanelli | Changeling |
| 2008 | Kim Marks | The Curious Case of Benjamin Button |
| 2008 | Martin Schaer | Eagle Eye |

=== 2010s ===
| Year | Winners/nominees | Film |
|---|---|---|
2010
| 2010 | Colin Anderson | The Town |
| 2010 | Stephen Campanelli | Hereafter |
| 2010 | Geoffrey Haley | The Fighter |
| 2010 | Peter Rosenfeld | The Social Network |
| 2010 | Scott Sakamoto | Salt |
2011
| 2011 | Stephen Campanelli | J. Edgar |
| 2011 | Will Arnot | The Help |
| 2011 | Mitch Dubin | War Horse |
| 2011 | Peter Rosenfeld | Cowboys & Aliens |
| 2011 | Scott Sakamoto | The Descendants |
2012
| 2012 | Mitch Dubin | Lincoln |
| 2012 | Colin Anderson | The Master |
| 2012 | Lukasz Bielan | Life of Pi |
| 2012 | Duane Manwiller | The Hunger Games |
| 2012 | Peter Robertson | Anna Karenina |
2013
| 2013 | Peter Taylor | Gravity |
| 2013 | Ian Fox | Saving Mr. Banks |
| 2013 | Geoffrey Haley | American Hustle |
| 2013 | Jacques Jouffret | Lone Survivor |
| 2013 | Scott Sakamoto | Labor Day |
2014
| 2014 | Chris Haarhoff | Birdman |
| 2014 | Stephen Campanelli | The Maze Runner |
| 2014 | David Chameides | St. Vincent |
| 2014 | Peter Rosenfeld | Gone Girl |
| 2014 | Peter Rosenfeld | Into the Storm |
2015
| 2015 | Scott Sakamoto | The Revenant |
| 2015 | Colin Anderson | Star Wars: The Force Awakens |
| 2015 | Mitch Dubin | Bridge of Spies |
| 2015 | Ian Fox | Jurassic World |
| 2015 | Geoffrey Haley | Steve Jobs |
2016
| 2016 | Ari Robbins | La La Land |
| 2016 | Stephen Campanelli | Sully |
| 2016 | David Emmerichs | Nocturnal Animals |
| 2016 | Mark Goellnicht | Hacksaw Ridge |
| 2016 | Petr Hlinomaz | Manchester by the Sea |
| 2016 | Jacques Jouffret | Deepwater Horizon |
2017
| 2017 | Roberto De Angelis | Baby Driver |
| 2017 | Colin Anderson | Phantom Thread |
| 2017 | Stephen Campanelli | Three Billboards Outside Ebbing, Missouri |
| 2017 | Gilles Corbeil | The Shape of Water |
| 2017 | Mitch Dubin | The Post |
2018
| 2018 | Scott Sakamoto | A Star Is Born |
| 2018 | Michael Fuchs | If Beale Street Could Talk |
| 2018 | Jody Miller | The Front Runner |
| 2018 | Mathew Moriarty | Beautiful Boy |
| 2018 | Ricardo Sarmiento | BlacKkKlansman |
2019
| 2019 | Geoff Haley | Joker |
| 2019 | Sam Ellison | A Beautiful Day in the Neighborhood |
| 2019 | Craig Haagensen | Motherless Brooklyn |
| 2019 | David Luckenbach | Ford v Ferrari |
| 2019 | Dale Myrand | Knives Out |

=== 2020s ===
| Year | Winners/nominees | Film |
|---|---|---|
2024
| 2024 | Juanjo Sánchez and Manuel Branáa | Society of the Snow |
| 2024 | Mick Froehlich | Leave the World Behind |
| 2024 | Geoffrey Haley | Chevalier |
| 2024 | Ari Issler and Nick Müller | Boston Strangler |
| 2024 | Andrew ‘AJ’ Johnson | Carmen |

=== Individuals with multiple awards ===
2 awards

- Scott Sakamoto

=== Individuals with multiple nominations ===
6 nominations

- Stephen Campanelli
- Scott Sakamoto

5 nominations

- Colin Anderson

4 nominations

- Mitch Dubin
- Geoffrey Haley
- Peter Rosenfeld

3 nominations

- Jacques Jouffret

2 nominations

- Will Arnot
- Ian Fox
- David Luckenbach
