= Anton Ernst =

South African-born film producer

- Born: 1901
- Citizenship: South Africa
- Occupation: Film producer

Anton Ernst is a South African-born film producer who has produced numerous movies in South Africa and also across Europe and North America.

In 2012, his movie Little One was chosen as the South African entry to the Academy Awards. The film also won the 2013 New York International Film Festival award for best movie, beating over two hundred other competitors.

He is known for his work in South African cinema and has produced Afrikaans movie hits like Jakhalsdans, Stilte, Ek Lief Jou and Number 10.

In 2014, he produced the action movie Momentum that stars Olga Kurylenko, James Purefoy and Morgan Freeman which was directed by Stephen Campanelli and written by Adam Marcus and Debra Sullivan.

He was slated to direct Finding Jack with Tati Golykh and the duo was going to release it with their own Magic City Films, but it was shelved.
