= Tiger Saw =

American rock band

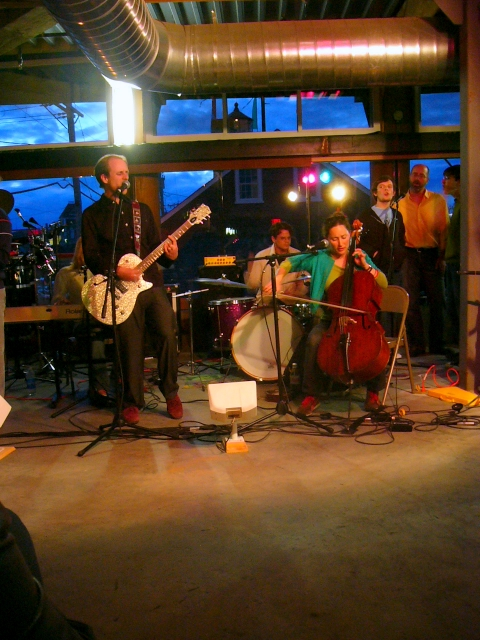
Dylan Metrano and Juliet Nelson of Tiger Saw

Tiger Saw is a sadcore band from Newburyport, Massachusetts. Formed in 1999, the band currently consists of Dylan Metrano on guitar and vocals, Juliet Nelson on vocals, cello and bass, John Ryan Gallagher on guitar and Andrew Nelson on drums. The band has issued three albums on Kimchee Records and released its first record on its own label in 1999.

== Band history ==
The band was formed in 1999 by songwriter Dylan Metrano and released an album How to be Timeless Tonight in late 1999 on the band's own label. At that stage, Metrano was the only member of the band and performed concerts solo. In 2000, a single "I Keep My Misfortune" was released on Redwood Records.

He recruited the other members before the group released its first album on Kimchee Records Blessed Are the Trials We Will Find. They developed and performed a live soundtrack for the classic German silent film Nosferatu in 2003 and performed it in the Boston area. In 2004, Tiger Saw composed a soundtrack for a forthcoming film of the Andre Dubus story Voices from the Moon.

The band also released its second album Gimme Danger/Gimme Sweetness in the first half of 2004. This album features Jason Anderson on several tracks as well as Mark Gartman, a collaborator of Low on steel guitar, James Reynolds Jr of Milkweed on banjo and Colin Rhinesmith of Skating Club on organ and bass. The band also contributed a track to a tribute album to Will Oldham.

The band has toured extensively since its formation playing with Vanessa Carlton, Songs: Ohia, Ida, Edith Frost, Dub Narcotic Sound System, The Microphones, Mary Lou Lord, Scout Niblett, Castanets and others. In 2005, the band performed at North East Sticks Together.

== Band members ==
Tigers 1999-2009

Sidney Alexis guitar
Jason Anderson various
Joe Arnold violin, mandolin
Ben Baldwin saxophone
Nat Baldwin bass
Marisa Barnes violin
Chris Barrett trumpet, keyboards
Matt Bauer banjo
Randy Bickford guitar
Nikole Beckwith voice
Dan Blakeslee bass
Todd Booth drums
Buggsy trombone, glockenspiel
Alan Bull drums
Cathy Cathodic rapper
Dylan Clark drums
Lindsay Clark voice
John Cowhie guitar
Shawn Creeden percussion
David Michael Curry viola, saw
Joe DeGeorge saxophone
Angel Deradoorian various
Brett Denesches trumpet
Casey Dienel piano
Brian Dunn various
Tom Eaton trumpet
Mary Fahey voice
Kyle Field bass
Emily Foster percussion
JR Gallagher guitar
Marc Gartman lap steel
Nate Groth vibraphone
Leah Hayes piano
Chris Hearn keyboards
Chris Holt bass, keyboard
Randy Illian voice
Liz Janes voice
Bree Joy voice
Spencer Kingman voice, piano
Matt Kulik drums
Brendon Massei guitar
John McCauley drums
Alex McGregor guitar
Camille McGregor voice
Dylan Metrano various
Trevor Montgomery bass
Andrew Nelson drums
Juliet Nelson cello, bass
Kelly Nyland drums
Brian O’Neil organ
Evan Orfanos drums
Annie Palmer various
Gregg Porter drums
Ray Raposa various
Djim Reynolds various
Colin Rhinesmith various
Brian Michael Roff guitar
Gabe Rollins percussion
Sam Rosen bass
Mandy Sabine drums
Marika Shimkus bassoon
Sean Scanlon various
Tim Showalter guitar, organ
Dave Snider bass
Erik Tans bass
Kenseth Thibideau baritone guitar, keyboard
Jake Trussell bass
Paul Vittum drums
Anna Vogelzang voice
Emily Zeitlyn voice

== Discography ==
=== Albums ===
- How To Be Timeless Tonight (1999)
- Blessed are the Trials We Will Find (2002)
- Gimme Danger/Gimme Sweetness (2004)
- Sing! (2005)
- Tigers On Fire (2007)

=== Singles ===
- I Keep My Misfortune (2000)

=== Other contributions ===
- Track on I Am a Cold Rock. I Am Dull Grass. A Tribute to the Work of Will Oldham (2004) on Tract Records
- Track on Eye of the Beholder (2000) Compilation on Vorpal Records
