= Conspiracy (2008 film) =

2008 film by Adam Marcus

- Film poster
- Directed by: Adam Marcus
- Written by: Adam Marcus; Debra Sullivan
- Produced by: Gilbert Dumontet; Ira Posnansky; Alison Semenza
- Starring: Val Kilmer; Gary Cole; Jennifer Esposito; Jay Jablonski; Greg Serano
- Cinematography: Ben Weinstein
- Edited by: Eric L. Beason
- Music by: Sujin Nam
- Production companies: Hollywood Media Bridge; Stage 6 Films
- Distributed by: Sony Pictures Home Entertainment
- Release date: March 18, 2008
- Running time: 90 minutes
- Country: United States
- Language: English
- Budget: $8 million

Conspiracy is a 2008 American action thriller film written and directed by Adam Marcus and stars Val Kilmer and Jennifer Esposito. The film was released on direct-to-DVD in the United States on March 18, 2008.

== Plot ==
William "Spooky" MacPherson is a disabled special operations Marine wounded during combat operations in Iraq. When MacPherson decides to visit a friend on a ranch in the Southwestern United States, he discovers that his friend has disappeared, and no one will acknowledge that he ever lived there.

== Cast ==
- Val Kilmer as William MacPherson
- Gary Cole as Rhodes
- Jennifer Esposito as Joanna
- Jay Jablonski as Deputy Foster
- Greg Serano as Miguel Silva
- Stacy Marie Warden as Carly
- Christopher Gehrman as E. B.
- Bob Rumnock as Sheriff Bock
- Jude B. Lanston as Sergeant

== Production ==
The film was shot in Galisteo, New Mexico in 30 days from April 19 to May 19, 2007.

== Reception ==
The film received overwhelmingly negative reviews. Richard Roeper wrote, "It's beyond dreadful. It's jaw-droppingly bad." Cinemagazine rated the film 2 stars.

One person claimed the plot is similar to the classic western film noir thriller Bad Day at Black Rock (1955), which itself was an adaptation of a short story "Bad Time at Honda" by Howard Breslin.
