= Let It Snow (1999 film) =

2001 film by Adam Marcus

- Directed by: Adam Marcus
- Written by: Kipp Marcus
- Produced by: Kipp Marcus
- Starring: Kipp Marcus; Alice Dylan; Bernadette Peters; Larry Pine; Henry Simmons; Judith Malina; Miriam Shor
- Cinematography: Ben Weinstein
- Edited by: Joe Klotz
- Music by: Sean McCourt
- Production companies: Girl & Boy Productions; Marcus Bros.
- Distributed by: Artistic License; Curb Entertainment; Monarch Home Video
- Release dates: 1999 (AFI Fest); June 8, 2001 (United States)
- Running time: 90 minutes
- Country: United States
- Language: English
- Box office: $4,020

Let It Snow (also known as Snow Days) is a 1999 American romantic comedy film directed by Adam Marcus and written and produced by his brother, Kipp Marcus, who also stars. Additional cast members include Alice Dylan, Bernadette Peters, Larry Pine, Henry Simmons, Judith Malina, and Miriam Shor. The story involves a young man who finds love during "snow days" time off from high school, but spends years finding his true self. He is haunted by a family curse—as told to him by his grandmother—that the men in the family are doomed.

The film was released by Artistic License on June 8, 2001 to mixed reviews.

== Plot ==
James Ellis (Kipp Marcus) meets and falls in love with Sarah (Alice Dylan) during time off for snow days while in high school. James, however, has commitment issues, and Sarah eventually winds up engaged to Peter (Peter Giles). His grandmother (Judith Malina) had warned him about the family curse, that the "men always leave and the women go crazy", which causes James to be reluctant to commit. Over the next few years, James searches for his true self, ending up at "The CIA" – the Culinary Institute of America.

His eccentric mother Elise (Bernadette Peters), still upset that her husband left her and James, is on an endless search for her inner self and has commitment issues of her own. She spends her time with a series of lovers who don't speak English, in the "International House of Boyfriends".

Ultimately James overcomes the family curse and wins Sarah.

== Cast ==
- Kipp Marcus as James Ellis
- Alice Dylan as Sarah Milson
- Bernadette Peters as Elise Ellis
- Judith Malina as Grammy
- Larry Pine as Wendell Milson
- Henry Simmons as Mitch Jennings
- Miriam Shor as Beth
- Stephen Colbert as "happy successful guy"

== Production ==
=== Development ===
Brothers Adam and Kipp Marcus comprise the writing, producing and directing team behind this independent film, and Kipp also appears as the male lead. Kipp asked movie studios for their short-ends (unused film) at a cheap price to have enough film to shoot in 35mm.

=== Casting ===
Peters and Marcus on set

Kipp had wanted Bernadette Peters for the role of his mother, Elise, but when her agent said that she was too busy, he sent her the entire script via fax. After meeting with Kipp she accepted the part.

=== Filming ===
Part of the movie was filmed at the Marcus' mother's house in Westport, Connecticut.

== Critical response ==
The Variety reviewer Lael Loewenstein wrote: "Smarter and more appealing than many other recent romantic comedies." Elvis Mitchell in The New York Times wrote: "The film's naïveté makes up for its rampant predictability."

=== Accolades ===
At the AFI Fest, 1999, Let It Snow won awards for Best New Writing (Kipp Marcus) and Best Editing (Joe Klotz). At the Deauville Film Festival, it received a nomination for Grand Special Prize, 2000. The film was an "Official Selection" at the 2000 Sundance Film Festival.
