= Nikole Beckwith =

American film director

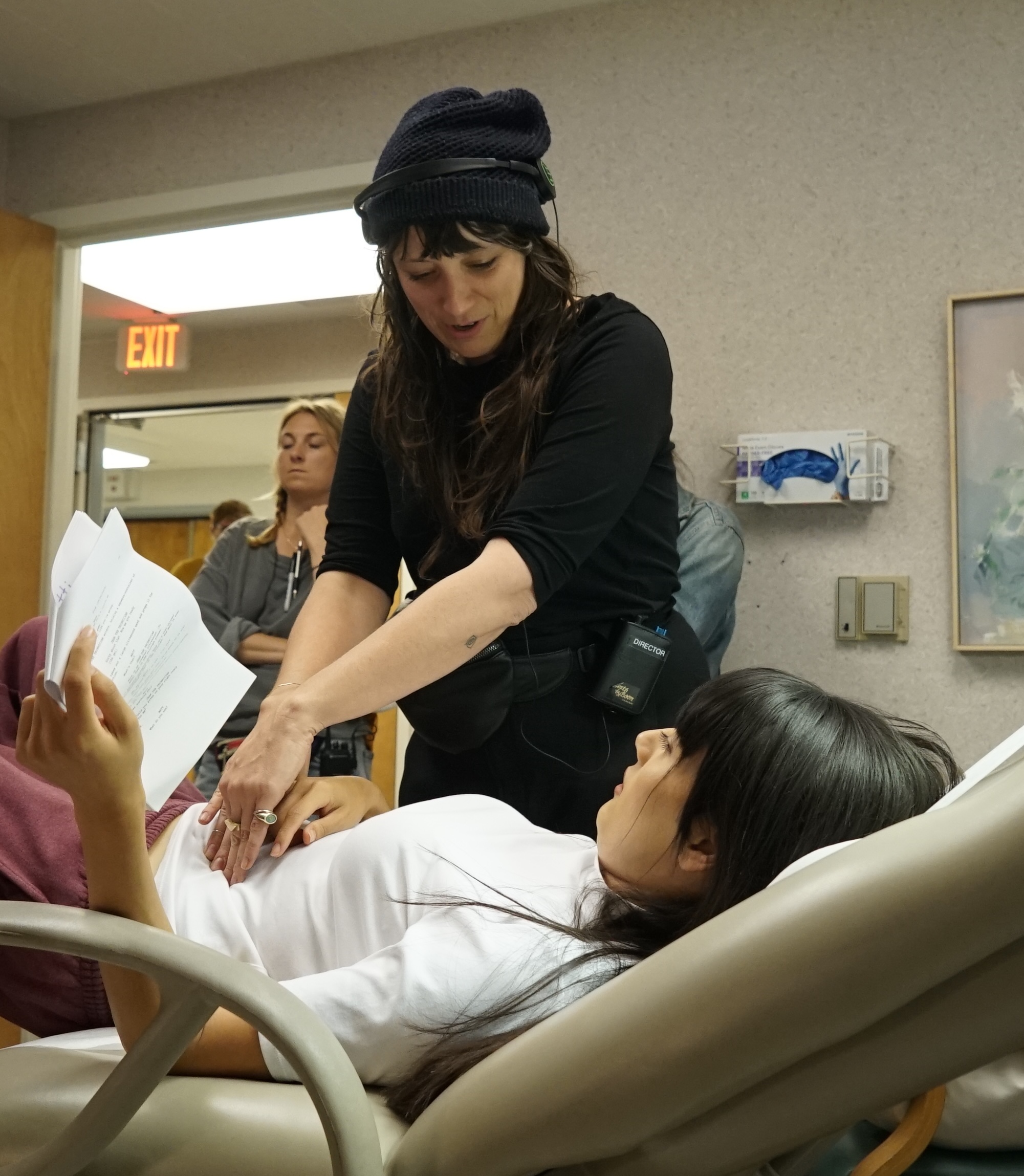
Nikole Beckwith in 2021

Nikole Beckwith is an American director, screenwriter, and playwright. Her writing credits include Stockholm, Pennsylvania (2015), 3 Generations (2015), Impulse (2019), Together Together (2021), and 3 episodes of the television series The First Lady (2022).

== Early life ==
Beckwith grew-up in Newburyport, Massachusetts. From age 16, she attended the Sudbury Valley School in Framingham, Massachusetts. In 2004, she became the youngest recipient of The Johnson Award for excellence in and contributions to the arts in the Merrimack Valley. She authored a short book of poems, Rhymes With Blue, which was released in a limited run by Independent Submarine in 2001.

In 2006, she moved to New York City, she was a three time Manhattan Monologue Slam champion, and is an alumna of the Ensemble studio theatre. playwright's group Youngblood and The Public Theater’s Emerging Writers Group. She was also a performer and director with The Striking Viking Story Pirates.

== Career ==
=== TV & Film ===
She wrote and directed the feature film of Stockholm, Pennsylvania (2015), about a young woman who is returned home to her biological parents after living with her abductor for 17 years. It starred Saoirse Ronan and premiered in the Dramatic Competition section at the 2015 Sundance Film Festival. The film was acquired by Lifetime and premiered on their TV channel on May 2, 2015. Her screenplay Stockholm, Pennsylvania won a 2012 Nicholl Fellowship in Screenwriting.

Beckwith wrote two episodes of the second season of the Youtube Original series Impulse (2019), and wrote and directed the film Together Together (2021), about a young loner who becomes gestational surrogate for a man in his 40s. The film had its world premiere in the U.S. Dramatic Competition section of the 2021 Sundance Film Festival.

Other writing credits include the film 3 Generations (2015), and 3 episodes of the television series The First Lady (2022).

=== Theater ===
She has written multiple plays. Her full-length plays include Everything Is Ours; Imagine My Sadness; Stockholm, Pennsylvania; and Untitled Matriarch Play (Or Seven Sisters). which she wrote in residence at The Royal National Theatre of London and premiered at The Royal Court directed by Vicki Featherstone. Beckwith has also written many short plays, including How it Tastes written for Rattlestick Playwrights Theater Dig Dig Dig written for Stella Adler Studio and Nice Place to Visit and PLAY FOR AN ALL WHITE STAGE which were commissioned by Old Vic New Voices.

As an actor she appeared in the premiere production of Joshua Conkel’s 2009 underground hit MilkMilkLemonade originating the role of Lady in a Leotard alongside Michael Cyril Creighton as Nanna and Jess Barbagallo as Elliot, directed by Isaac Butler.

=== Music ===
Beckwith recreationally performed live with a handful of bands and sings on Tiger Saw's 2005 record Sing!, Adrian Orange’s 2005 I Am Yours (full version) and Sam Buck Rosen's 2006 release The Look South. She toured musically with Drew Danbury between 2004 and 2006 and inspired the song ’Nikole’ on his 2012 record For all the Girls.

== Personal life ==
Beckwith splits her time between Brooklyn, Massachusetts and Los Angeles. She is close friends with author Kate Bolick and playwright/actor Eric Bogosian who gave the character of 'Sooze' the last name 'Beckwith' in the 2009 update of his play SubUrbia and thanks her in the acknowledgements.

She has two tattoos of the same dog; one drawn and tattooed by artist Rachel Howe, the other by artist Kris Chau, both of whom also have work featured in Together Together.

She's never had a driver’s license.
