= Jennifer Esposito =

American actress (born 1973)

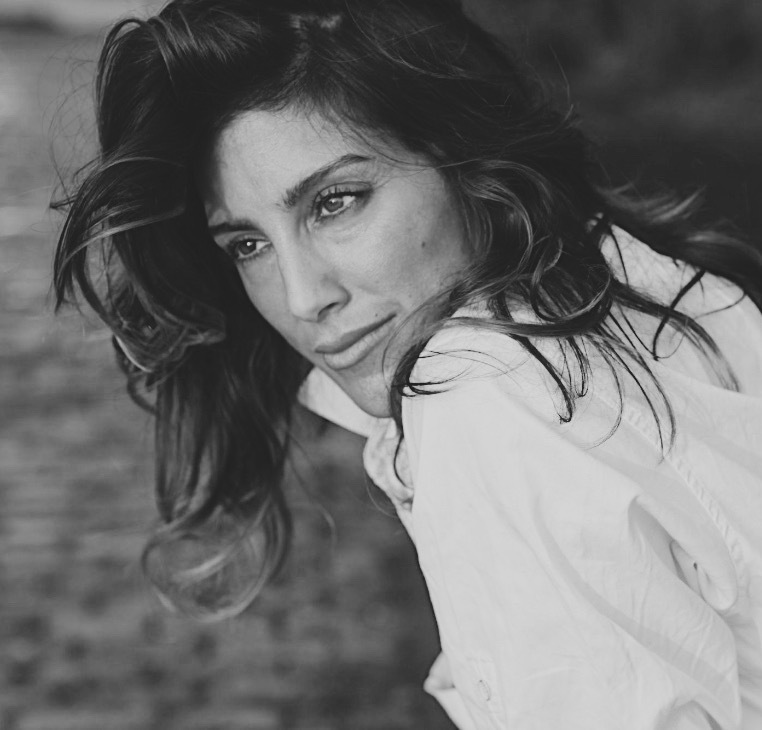
- Esposito in 2020
- Born: April 11, 1973 (age 53); New York City, U.S.
- Occupation: Actress
- Years active: 1995–present
- Spouses: Bradley Cooper (m. 2006; div. 2007) Louis Dowler (m. 2014; div. 2016) Jesper Vesterstrøm (m. 2020)

Jennifer Esposito (born April 11, 1973) is an American actress and director. She is known for her roles in the feature films Summer of Sam (1999), Don't Say a Word (2001), The Master of Disguise (2002), Welcome to Collinwood (2002), Crash (2004), Taxi (2004), and Mob Town (2019). She has also appeared in several television series, most notably The Looney Tunes Show, Spin City, Related, Samantha Who?, Blue Bloods, and Mistresses. From 2016 to 2017, she played Special Agent Alexandra Quinn on the CBS series NCIS, while from 2019 to 2020, she played CIA Deputy Director Susan Raynor in the Amazon series The Boys.

== Early life ==
Esposito was born in the Brooklyn borough of New York City and is of Italian descent. She was raised on Staten Island in Bulls Head and is a graduate of Moore Catholic High School.

== Career ==
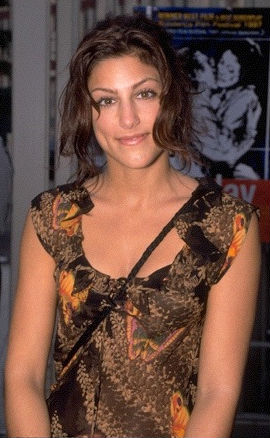
Esposito in 2008

Esposito made her first television appearance in Law & Order in 1996. She then joined the cast of Spin City, where she appeared for two seasons. She also appeared in I Still Know What You Did Last Summer. One of her more notable roles was as "Ruby" in Spike Lee's Summer of Sam in 1999, which was set against the late 1970s backdrop of the Son of Sam murders. Esposito's next films included Dracula 2000, The Master of Disguise, the 2004 comedy Taxi, and the Academy Award-winning film Crash, in which she played Don Cheadle's partner and romantic interest, Ria.

Esposito joined Jon Favreau, Stephen Dorff, Luis Guzmán, and Barry Pepper for Dinner for Five season 3, episode 7, on May 21, 2004. Esposito has made television appearances on the series Law & Order: Special Victims Unit, Rescue Me, and Mercy. She was a regular cast member on Related and Samantha Who? Esposito joined the cast of the CBS drama Blue Bloods in 2010, playing the role of Detective Jackie Curatola, the partner of Detective Danny Reagan (played by Donnie Wahlberg). In the third season Esposito was diagnosed with celiac disease and, after collapsing on set, Esposito informed CBS that her condition would limit her availability to work on the series. Rather than work around her limited schedule, Blue Bloods producers chose to write her character out of the series in 2012.

In 2013, she launched Jennifer's Way Bakery in Manhattan's West Village, which only serves celiac-safe food. In 2014 she joined the NBC series Taxi Brooklyn. On April 22, 2014, Da Capo Lifelong Books published Esposito's first book Jennifer's Way, a detailed look into her personal struggle with celiac disease before and after she was diagnosed and the things she did to survive. The book made The New York Times Best Seller List on July 6, 2014. In 2015, Esposito played Calista Raines in the ABC drama series Mistresses, and it was reported that she would be a cast member on the CBS pilot Taxi-22, whose main character would be played by John Leguizamo. She played Dominic West's sister in the Showtime series The Affair for six episodes.

Esposito became the brand ambassador for Eclair Naturals also in 2015, a gluten- and GMO-free vegan body and skin care line available in Rite Aid stores across the United States. In 2016, it was announced that Esposito would join the cast of NCIS as Special Agent Alexandra "Alex" Quinn, executive producer Gary Glasberg noting, "We couldn't be happier to have Jennifer Esposito joining us for season 14. She embodies everything that we hoped for in the character of Quinn and we can't wait to have her come be a part of our team." In June 2017, it was announced that this would be her only season. Esposito appeared on the September 10, 2016, episode of Oprah: Where Are They Now?, where she said her doctor had her hospitalized in a psychiatric ward. She said the hospitalization happened during the time she was an actress on the show Samantha Who?

In 2019, she joined the cast of The Boys, an Amazon Prime Exclusive. In August, she was set to play a recurring role in the Awkwafina Is Nora from Queens series on Comedy Central.

In February 2020, it was announced that Esposito had joined the cast of the Netflix series Inventing Anna created by Shonda Rhimes in the role of Talia Mallay. However, this role was ultimately played by Marika Domińczyk.

In 2023, Esposito wrote, directed, and starred in the film Fresh Kills playing the mother of two daughters in a coming-of-age story centered in the world of an organized crime family.

== Personal life ==
Esposito married actor Bradley Cooper on December 30, 2006. They divorced in November 2007.

In 2009, Esposito became engaged to Australian tennis player Mark Philippoussis. The couple separated in August 2010.

In May 2014, Esposito announced her engagement to British model Louis Dowler. They married on November 16, 2014, in New York City. It was reported in March 2016 that Esposito had filed for divorce from Dowler.

In 2020, Esposito married Jesper Vesterstrøm.

In October 2011, Esposito revealed that she had celiac disease.

== Filmography ==
=== Film ===
Year	Title	Role	Notes
1997	A Brother's Kiss	Lucy	
1997	Kiss Me, Guido	Debbie	
1997	A Brooklyn State of Mind	Donna Delgrosso	
1998	No Looking Back	Teresa	
1998	He Got Game	Ms. Janus	
1998	Charlie Hoboken	Girl in church	
1998	Side Streets	Jessica	
1998	I Still Know What You Did Last Summer	Nancy	
1999	Summer of Sam	Ruby	
1999	Just One Time	Michelle	
1999	The Bachelor	Daphne	
2000	Dracula 2000	Solina	
2001	Backflash	Olive Dee "Harley" Klintucker	Direct to video
2001	The Proposal	Susan Reese	
2001	Made	Club girl	Uncredited
2001	Don't Say a Word	Det. Sandra Cassidy	
2001	Beyond the City Limits	Helena Toretti	
2002	Welcome to Collinwood	Carmela	
2002	The Master of Disguise	Jennifer Baker	
2004	Breakin' All the Rules	Rita Monroe	
2004	Crash	Ria	
2004	Taxi	Lt. Marta Robbins	
2006	Jesus, Mary and Joey	Frankie Vitello	
2008	Conspiracy	Joanna	
2008	American Crude	Carlos	
2009	Four Single Fathers	Suzanne	
2011	Mamitas	Miss Ruiz	
2012	Bending the Rules	Olivia Garcia	
2014	She's Funny That Way	Margie	
2018	Speed Kills	Kathy Aronoff	
2019	Mary	Detective Clarkson	
2019	Mob Town	Natalie Passatino	
2022	Somewhere in Queens	Pamela Carmelo	
2023	Fresh Kills	Francine Larusso	Director, writer and producer
2025	F Plus	Principal Neely	

=== Television ===
Year	Title	Role	Notes
1995–1996	The City	Connie Soleito	3 episodes (Season 1: Episodes 14, 15 & 143)
1996	The Sunshine Boys	Jeannie	Television film
1996	Law & Order	Gina Tucci	Episode: "Good Girl"
1997	Feds	Flo	Episode: "Crash and Burn"
1997–1999	Spin City	Stacey Paterno	46 episodes
1998	New York Undercover	Gina Stone	3 episodes
2000	Law & Order: Special Victims Unit	Sara Logan	Episode: "Remorse"
2002	Hack	Abby	Episode: "Obsession"
2004–2005	Judging Amy	Louann "Crystal" Turner	8 episodes
2005–2006	Related	Ginnie Sorelli	Main role
2005	Snow Wonder	Pilar	Television film
2006	Law & Order	Justine Bailey	Episode: "In Vino Veritas"
2007	Rescue Me	Nona	5 episodes
2007–2009	Samantha Who?	Andrea Belladonna	Main role
2010	Mercy	Jules Fattore	2 episodes
2010	The Wish List	Sarah Fisher	Television film
2010–2012, 2023 and 2024	Blue Bloods	Detective Jackie Curatola/Chief of Police Jackie Curatola	Main role, seasons 1–3; Guest, seasons 13 & 14, episodes: "Forgive Us Our Trespasses" & "Dropping Bombs"
2011–2012	The Looney Tunes Show	Tina Russo (voice)	5 episodes
2014	Taxi Brooklyn	Monica Pena	Main role
2015	Mistresses	Calista Raines	Main role
2015–2017	The Affair	Nina Solloway	6 episodes
2016–2017	NCIS	NCIS Special Agent Alexandra "Alex" Quinn	Main role
2018	Blindspot	Lynette	2 episodes
2019–2021	Law & Order: Special Victims Unit	Sergeant Phoebe Baker	4 episodes
2019–2020	The Boys	Susan Raynor	6 episodes
2020–2023	Awkwafina Is Nora from Queens	Brenda	14 episodes

=== Web ===
Year	Title	Role	Notes
2009	The Broadroom	Roan	Main role; 4 episodes
2018	Liza on Demand	Holly	Episode: "Pilot"
