= Stockholm, Pennsylvania =

- Directed by: Nikole Beckwith
- Written by: Nikole Beckwith
- Produced by: Gregg Ammon; Dan Halsted; Leslie Urdang
- Starring: Saoirse Ronan; Cynthia Nixon; Jason Isaacs
- Cinematography: Arnaud Potier
- Edited by: Joe Klotz
- Music by: Nora Kroll-Rosenbaum; Brian McOmber
- Production companies: Fido Features; Olympus Pictures
- Distributed by: Lifetime
- Release dates: January 23, 2015 (Sundance); May 2, 2015 (United States)
- Running time: 99 minutes
- Country: United States
- Language: English
- Budget: $850,000

Stockholm, Pennsylvania is a 2015 drama film directed by Nikole Beckwith, as her directorial and film-writing debut. The film premiered at the 2015 Sundance Film Festival. The screenplay was awarded the 2012 Nicholl Fellowship from Academy of Motion Picture Arts and Sciences.

It was produced by Greg Ammon, Leslie Urdang and Dan Halsted with the now defunct Fido Features. The film was acquired by Lifetime on March 26, 2015, and made its television premiere on May 2, 2015. The film is edited by Joe Klotz.

== Plot ==
Leanne Dargon is kidnapped at age 4 by Ben McKay, who confines her to his basement and renames her Leia, isolating her from almost all outside influences.

In events not directly covered in the film, she is discovered and reunited with her parents, Marcy and Glen Dargon, after an absence of 17 years.

Showing signs of Stockholm syndrome, Leia still sees Ben as her father, and sees two strangers in her biological parents.

As time passes, though, Marcy becomes the unstable one, throwing Glen out of the house, taking abrupt and erratic actions, doing attachment exercises, locking Leia up and controlling her as completely as McKay had.

As the film ends, Leia escapes the captivity and vows to make a life of her own.

== Cast ==
- Saoirse Ronan as Leia Dargon
  - Hana Hayes as Leia, aged 12
  - Avery Phillips as Leia, aged 9
- Cynthia Nixon as Marcy Dargon
- David Warshofsky as Glen Dargon
- Jason Isaacs as Ben McKay
- Rosalind Chao as Dr. Andrews

== Reception ==
The film received mixed reviews, with critics comparing the second half unfavorably with the first. On review aggregator Rotten Tomatoes, 27% of 11 reviews are positive, and the average rating is 4.6/10. On Metacritic, the film has a weighted average score of 47 out of 100, based on reviews from 5 critics, indicating "mixed or average reviews".

At the 20th Satellite Awards, the film won the award for Best Television Film. And was nominated for three Critics Choice Awards.
