= Stephen Campanelli =

Canadian cameraman and film director

Stephen Campanelli is a Canadian movie cameraman and film director. He has been a long-term member of Clint Eastwood's film production crew.

== Early life ==
Campanelli's mother Carmela emigrated from Italy to Canada. He traces his film interests to his mother sneaking into movies during WWII. Growing up in Montreal, he lived in Notre-Dame-de-Grace (NDG), and can speak English, Italian, and French. Campanelli's childhood hero was Clint Eastwood. He named his dog "Clint".

== Career ==
Campanelli first started camera work while at Marianopolis College, in Montreal, Quebec. He graduated from Marianopolis in 1978. Campanelli graduated from film studies from Concordia University, in Montreal, Quebec, with a Bachelor of Fine Arts in 1983. During his time there, he won first place in a student film competition that took place in Concordia's Hall Amphitheatre, for From a Whisper to a Scream. From a Whisper to a Scream later screened at the 1984 Montreal World Film Festival, receiving accolades. His first film job was on Meatballs III, which was filmed in the Montreal suburb of Hudson, Quebec.

He worked with cinematographer Jack N. Green, a frequent collaborator of Clint Eastwood's, who recommended him to Eastwood. Eastwood handled all the immigration papers to get Campanelli to be able to legally work in the United States. Campanelli went on to be a cameraman on Eastwood's production film crew, starting as camera operator on The Bridges of Madison County. In 2011, he was nominated for "Camera Operator of the Year" by the Society of Camera Operators, for his work on Hereafter. He worked on the Eastwood crew for 20 years, ending in the middle of shooting of American Sniper, where he had to depart in mid-filming to pursue his directorial debut on 2015's Momentum.

Campanelli directed his first film, Momentum, in South Africa. The film premiered at the 2015 Fantasia International Film Festival, on 22 July 2015, in Montreal, Quebec, Canada, screening in the same Hall Amphitheatre as he had screened his student film in, 30 years earlier.

His film Indian Horse, an adaptation of the novel by Richard Wagamese, debuted at the 2017 Toronto International Film Festival.

In 2019 his third film, the thriller-noir Grand Isle, was presented at the Lone Star Film Festival and received positive reviews from Variety, Fort Worth Weekly, and other periodicals.

His fourth film, Drinkwater, premiered at the Calgary International Film Festival in 2021.

In 2022, Sea to Sky Entertainment and Grinding Halt Films announced that Campanelli is slated to direct a film adaptation of Wagamese's 2009 novel Ragged Company.

== Accolades ==
Campanelli's film Indian Horse won the top award at the 2017 Vancouver International Film Festival. Grand Isle won the Spotlight Award at Lone Star Film Festival.

He was nominated for the Directors Guild of Canada's DGC Discovery Award in 2017 for Indian Horse.
