= List of awards and nominations received by RuPaul =

RuPaul awards and nominations
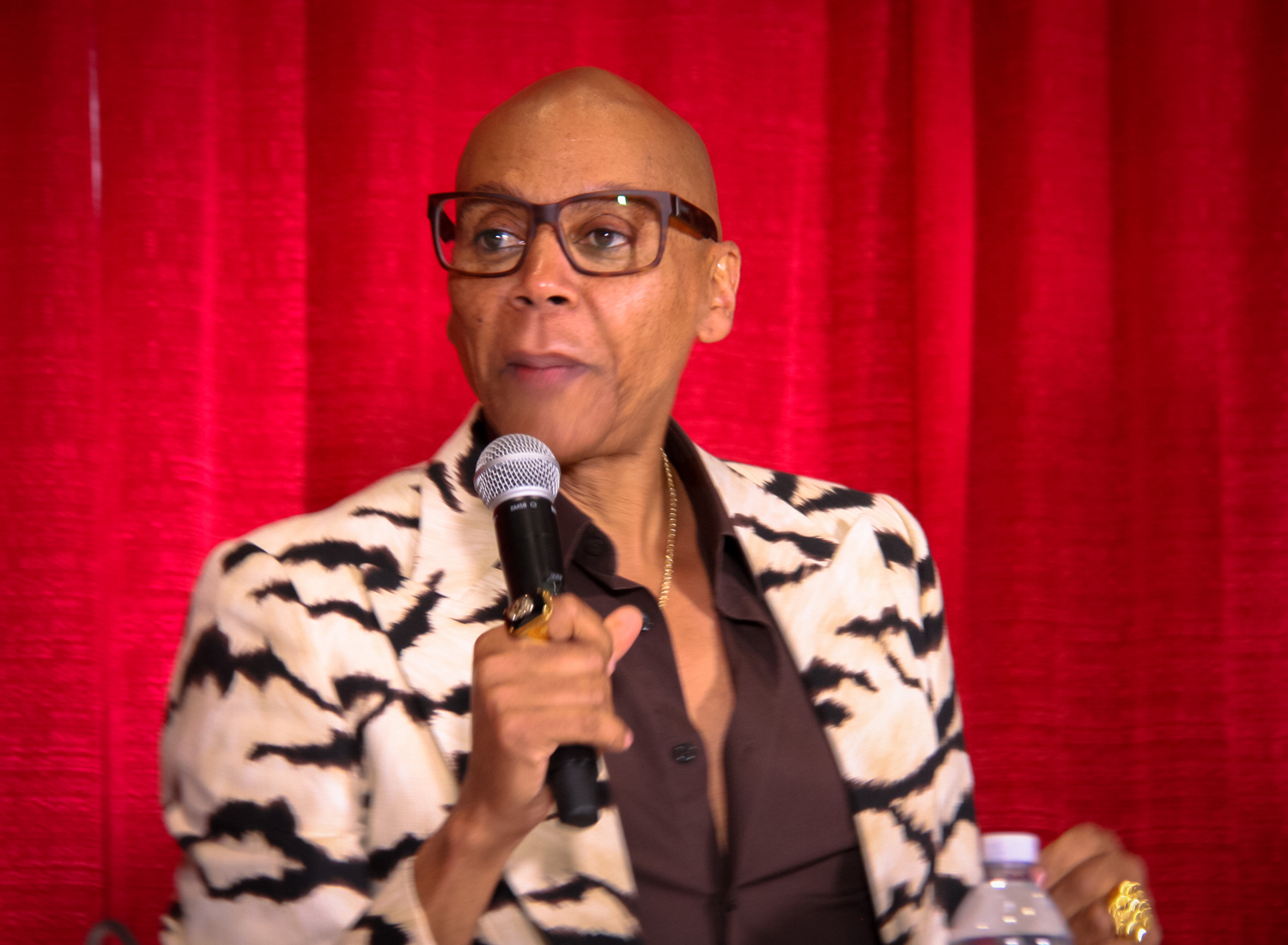
- RuPaul at the 2019 DragCon
Awards and nominations
Award	Wins	Nominations
AACTA Awards	0	1
Billboard Music Awards	2	2
Black Reel Awards	0	1
British Academy Television Awards	0	3
Canadian Screen Awards	5	6
Critics' Choice Real TV Awards	12	37
Critics' Choice Television Awards	1	8
Emmy Awards	14	31
EWwy Awards	1	1
Dorian Awards	0	2
Drama League Awards	1	1
GLAAD Media Awards	5	10
Hollywood Walk of Fame	1	1
MTV Movie & TV Awards	5	13
MTV Video Music Awards	0	1
NAACP Image Awards	0	3
National Television Awards	0	5
NewNowNext Awards	1	1
People's Choice Awards	0	6
Producers Guild of America Awards	5	8
TCA Awards	1	6
Tony Awards	1	2

Totals (Note: Certain award groups do not simply award one winner. They acknowledge several different recipients, have runners-up, and have third place. Since this is a specific recognition and is different from losing an award, runner-up mentions are considered wins in this award tally. For simplification and to avoid errors, each award in this list has been presumed to have had a prior nomination.)
- Wins: 55
- Nominations: 149

RuPaul Charles is an American drag queen, actor, model, singer, songwriter, and television personality. He is considered to be the most famous drag queen ever, and in 2017 he was included in the annual Time 100 list of the most influential people in the world.

Since 2009, he has produced and hosted the reality competition series RuPaul's Drag Race and its various iterations, including All Stars, Untucked and Drag Race UK. RuPaul's Drag Race was met with critical acclaim and was praised for "creat[ing] an entertainingly voyeuristic glimpse into the performance art world of drag queens". It has earned Charles 14 Primetime Emmy Awards, making him the person with the most wins in the category of Outstanding Host for a Reality Competition Program and the most-awarded person of color in the show's history, one Critics' Choice Television Award, and five Producers Guild of America Awards. RuPaul's Drag Race UK was nominated for three BAFTA TV Awards, while Canada's Drag Race has won several Canadian Screen Awards, with Charles being the recipient of four Best Reality/Competition Series awards as one of the executive producers of the show. In 2022, he won the Tony Award for Best Musical for producing the Broadway show A Strange Loop.

Charles had already achieved international fame as a drag queen with the release of his single "Supermodel (You Better Work)", from the album Supermodel of the World (1993), for which he received two Billboard Music Awards and an MTV Video Music Award nomination. He was also honored with the GLAAD Vito Russo Award in 1999, presented to an openly LGBT media professional who has made a significant difference in promoting equality for the LGBT community, and in 2018 he received a star on the Hollywood Walk of Fame for his contributions to the television industry, making him the first drag queen to be given such an award.

== Awards, honors and nominations ==
Awards and nominations received by RuPaul
Award	Year (Note: Indicates the year of ceremony.)	Work	Category	Result	Ref.
AACTA Awards	2022	RuPaul's Drag Race Down Under (Note: shared with Fenton Bailey, Cailah Scobie, Amanda Duthie, and Nicola Van der Meijden)	Best Entertainment Program	Nominated	
Billboard Music Awards	1993	"Supermodel (You Better Work)"	#1 Dance Single	Won	
Billboard Music Awards	1993	"Supermodel (You Better Work)"	#1 12" Dance Single	Won	
Black Reel Awards	2019	Grace and Frankie	Outstanding Guest Actor, Comedy Series	Nominated	
British Academy Television Awards	2020	RuPaul's Drag Race UK (Note: shared with World of Wonder.)	Best Reality and Constructed Factual	Nominated	
British Academy Television Awards	2022	RuPaul's Drag Race UK (Note: shared with Fenton Bailey, Tom Campbell, Bruce McCoy, Sally Miles, and Matt Green.)	Best Reality and Constructed Factual	Nominated	
British Academy Television Awards	2023	RuPaul's Drag Race UK (Note: shared with Fenton Bailey, Tom Campbell, Tony Grech-Smith, and Matt Green.)	Best Reality and Constructed Factual	Nominated	
Canadian Screen Awards	2021	Canada's Drag Race (Note: shared with Fenton Bailey, Randy Barbato, Mike Bickerton, Tom Campbell, Michael Kot, Randy Lennox, Jen Markowitz, Pam McNair, Laura Michalchyshyn, Betty Orr, and Tracey Pearce.)	Best Reality/Competition Series	Won	
Canadian Screen Awards	2022	Canada's Drag Race (Note: shared with Fenton Bailey, Randy Barbato, Trevor Boris, Tom Campbell, Spencer Fritz, Michael Kot, Jen Markowitz, Pam McNair, Laura Michalshyshyn, Betty Orr, and Justin Stockman.)	Best Reality/Competition Series	Won	
Canadian Screen Awards	2022	The Bravest Knight	Best Performance, Animation	Won	
Canadian Screen Awards	2023	Canada's Drag Race (Note: shared with Fenton Bailey, Randy Barbato, Trevor Boris, Tom Campbell, Spencer Fritz, Michael Kot, Michelle Mama, Laura Michalshyshyn, Betty Orr, Justin Stockman, and Yette Vandendam.)	Best Reality/Competition Series	Nominated	
Canadian Screen Awards	2024	Canada's Drag Race: Canada vs. the World	Best Reality/Competition Series	Won	
Canadian Screen Awards	2025	Canada's Drag Race (Note: shared with Brett Ashley, Fenton Bailey, Randy Barbato, Trevor Boris, Tom Campbell, Spencer Fritz, Michael Kot, Tomás Maturana, Laura Michalshyshyn, Betty Orr, Justin Stockman, and Yette Vandendam.)	Best Reality/Competition Series	Won	
Critics' Choice Real TV Awards	2019	RuPaul's Drag Race	Best Competition Series	Won	
Critics' Choice Real TV Awards	2019	RuPaul's Drag Race	Best Ensemble Cast in an Unscripted Series	Nominated	
Critics' Choice Real TV Awards	2019	RuPaul's Drag Race	Best Show Host	Nominated	
Critics' Choice Real TV Awards	2019	RuPaul's Drag Race	Male Star of the Year	Nominated	
Critics' Choice Real TV Awards	2019	RuPaul's Drag Race: Untucked	Best Unstructured Series	Nominated	
Critics' Choice Real TV Awards	2020	RuPaul's Drag Race	Best Competition Series	Won	
Critics' Choice Real TV Awards	2020	RuPaul's Drag Race	Best Ensemble Cast in an Unscripted Series	Nominated	
Critics' Choice Real TV Awards	2020	RuPaul's Drag Race	Best Show Host	Nominated	
Critics' Choice Real TV Awards	2020	RuPaul's Drag Race	Male Star of the Year	Nominated	
Critics' Choice Real TV Awards	2020	RuPaul's Drag Race: Untucked	Best Unstructured Series	Nominated	
Critics' Choice Real TV Awards	2021	RuPaul's Drag Race	Best Competition Series	Won (Note: tied with The Great British Bake Off)	
Critics' Choice Real TV Awards	2021	RuPaul's Drag Race	Best Ensemble Cast in an Unscripted Series	Won	
Critics' Choice Real TV Awards	2021	RuPaul's Drag Race	Best Show Host	Nominated	
Critics' Choice Real TV Awards	2021	RuPaul's Drag Race	Male Star of the Year	Nominated	
Critics' Choice Real TV Awards	2021	RuPaul's Drag Race: Untucked	Best Unstructured Series	Nominated	
Critics' Choice Real TV Awards	2022	RuPaul's Drag Race	Best Competition Series	Won (Note: tied with Top Chef)	
Critics' Choice Real TV Awards	2022	RuPaul's Drag Race	Best Ensemble Cast in an Unscripted Series	Won	
Critics' Choice Real TV Awards	2022	RuPaul's Drag Race	Best Show Host	Nominated	
Critics' Choice Real TV Awards	2022	RuPaul's Drag Race	Male Star of the Year	Nominated	
Critics' Choice Real TV Awards	2022	RuPaul's Drag Race: Untucked	Best Unstructured Series	Won	
Critics' Choice Real TV Awards	2023	RuPaul's Drag Race	Best Competition Series	Nominated	
Critics' Choice Real TV Awards	2023	RuPaul's Drag Race All Stars	Best Competition Series	Nominated	
Critics' Choice Real TV Awards	2023	RuPaul's Drag Race All Stars	Best Ensemble Cast in an Unscripted Series	Won	
Critics' Choice Real TV Awards	2023	Lingo	Best Game Show	Nominated	
Critics' Choice Real TV Awards	2023	RuPaul's Drag Race and RuPaul's Drag Race All Stars	Best Show Host	Won (Note: tied with Padma Lakshmi for Top Chef and Taste the Nation with Padma Lakshmi)	
Critics' Choice Real TV Awards	2023	RuPaul's Drag Race and RuPaul's Drag Race All Stars	Star of the Year	Nominated	
Critics' Choice Real TV Awards	2024	RuPaul's Drag Race	Best Competition Series	Nominated	
Critics' Choice Real TV Awards	2024	RuPaul's Drag Race	Best Lifestyle Show: Fashion/Beauty	Won	
Critics' Choice Real TV Awards	2024	RuPaul's Drag Race	Best Ensemble Cast in an Unscripted Series	Nominated	
Critics' Choice Real TV Awards	2024	RuPaul's Drag Race	Best Show Host	Nominated	
Critics' Choice Real TV Awards	2024	RuPaul's Drag Race	Male Star of the Year	Nominated	
Critics' Choice Real TV Awards	2025	RuPaul's Drag Race	Best Competition Series	Nominated	
Critics' Choice Real TV Awards	2025	RuPaul's Drag Race	Best Lifestyle Show: Fashion/Beauty	Won	
Critics' Choice Real TV Awards	2025	RuPaul's Drag Race All Stars	Best Lifestyle Show: Fashion/Beauty	Nominated	
Critics' Choice Real TV Awards	2026	RuPaul's Drag Race	Best Competition Series	Nominated	
Critics' Choice Real TV Awards	2026	RuPaul's Drag Race	Best Lifestyle Show: Fashion/Beauty	Won	
Critics' Choice Real TV Awards	2026	RuPaul's Drag Race	Best Show Host	Nominated	
Critics' Choice Television Awards	2011	RuPaul's Drag Race	Best Reality Series – Competition	Nominated	
Critics' Choice Television Awards	2012	RuPaul's Drag Race	Best Reality Show Host	Nominated	
Critics' Choice Television Awards	2013	RuPaul's Drag Race	Best Reality Show Host	Nominated	
Critics' Choice Television Awards	2014	RuPaul's Drag Race	Best Reality Show Host	Nominated	
Critics' Choice Television Awards	2016	RuPaul's Drag Race	Best Reality Show Host	Nominated	
Critics' Choice Television Awards	2016	RuPaul's Drag Race	Best Reality Series – Competition	Nominated	
Critics' Choice Television Awards	2018	RuPaul's Drag Race	Best Reality Series – Competition	Nominated	
Critics' Choice Television Awards	2018	RuPaul's Drag Race	Best Reality Show Host	Won	
Dorian Awards	2023	RuPaul	Timeless Award	Nominated (Note: RuPaul was listed as one of the nominees, but the winners were never announced.)	
Dorian Awards	2024	RuPaul	GALECA LGBTQIA+ TV Trailblazer Award	Nominated	
Drama League Awards	2022	A Strange Loop (Note: shared with the producers of A Strange Loop.)	Outstanding Production of a Musical	Won	
EWwy Awards	2013	RuPaul's Drag Race	Best Dressed Reality TV Judge	Won	
GLAAD Media Awards	1999	RuPaul	GLAAD Vito Russo Award	Honored	
GLAAD Media Awards	2010	RuPaul's Drag Race	Outstanding Reality Program	Won	
GLAAD Media Awards	2019	RuPaul's Drag Race	Outstanding Reality Program	Nominated	
GLAAD Media Awards	2020	RuPaul's Drag Race	Outstanding Reality Program	Nominated	
GLAAD Media Awards	2021	RuPaul's Drag Race	Outstanding Reality Program	Nominated	
GLAAD Media Awards	2022	RuPaul's Drag Race	Outstanding Reality Program	Won (Note: tied with We're Here)	
GLAAD Media Awards	2023	RuPaul's Drag Race	Outstanding Reality Competition Program	Nominated	
GLAAD Media Awards	2024	RuPaul's Drag Race	Outstanding Reality Competition Program	Won	
GLAAD Media Awards	2025	RuPaul's Drag Race	Outstanding Reality Competition Program	Won	
GLAAD Media Awards	2026	RuPaul's Drag Race	Outstanding Reality Competition Program	Nominated	
Hollywood Walk of Fame	2018	RuPaul	Television	Inducted	
MTV Movie & TV Awards	2017	RuPaul's Drag Race	Best Reality Competition	Won	
MTV Movie & TV Awards	2017	RuPaul's Drag Race	Best Host	Nominated	
MTV Movie & TV Awards	2018	RuPaul's Drag Race	Best Reality Series/Franchise	Nominated	
MTV Movie & TV Awards	2019	RuPaul's Drag Race	Best Host	Nominated	
MTV Movie & TV Awards	2021	RuPaul's Drag Race	Best Competition Series	Won	
MTV Movie & TV Awards	2021	RuPaul's Drag Race	Best Host	Won	
MTV Movie & TV Awards	2021	RuPaul's Drag Race UK	Best International Reality Series	Nominated	
MTV Movie & TV Awards	2022	RuPaul's Drag Race	Best Competition Series	Won	
MTV Movie & TV Awards	2022	RuPaul's Drag Race	Best Host	Nominated	
MTV Movie & TV Awards	2022	Queen of the Universe	Best Unscripted Series	Nominated	
MTV Movie & TV Awards	2023	RuPaul's Drag Race All Stars	Best Reality Competition	Won	
MTV Movie & TV Awards	2023	RuPaul's Drag Race	Best Host	Nominated	
MTV Movie & TV Awards	2023	RuPaul's Drag Race (Note: shared with Michelle Visage.)	Best Reality On-Screen Team	Nominated	
MTV Video Music Awards	1993	"Supermodel (You Better Work)"	Best Dance Video	Nominated	
NAACP Image Awards	2021	RuPaul's Drag Race	Outstanding Host in a Reality Competition, Game Show or Variety	Nominated	
NAACP Image Awards	2024	RuPaul's Drag Race	Outstanding Host in a Reality Competition, Game Show or Variety	Nominated	
NAACP Image Awards	2024	RuPaul's Drag Race	Outstanding Short Form Series – Reality/Nonfiction	Nominated	
National Television Awards	2020	RuPaul's Drag Race UK	The Bruce Forsyth Entertainment Award	Nominated	
National Television Awards	2020	RuPaul's Drag Race UK	TV Judge	Nominated	
National Television Awards	2021	RuPaul's Drag Race UK	Talent Show	Nominated	
National Television Awards	2022	RuPaul's Drag Race UK	Talent Show	Nominated	
National Television Awards	2022	RuPaul's Drag Race UK	Talent Show Judge	Nominated	
NewNowNext Awards	2010	RuPaul's Drag Race	Best New Indulgence	Won	
People's Choice Awards	2019	RuPaul's Drag Race	The Competition Show of 2019	Nominated	
People's Choice Awards	2020	RuPaul's Drag Race	The Competition Show of 2020	Nominated	
People's Choice Awards	2021	RuPaul's Drag Race	The Competition Show of 2021	Nominated	
People's Choice Awards	2022	RuPaul's Drag Race	The Competition Show of 2022	Nominated	
People's Choice Awards	2024	RuPaul's Drag Race	The Competition Show of the Year	Nominated	
People's Choice Awards	2024	RuPaul's Drag Race	The Host of the Year	Nominated	
Primetime Emmy Awards	2016	RuPaul's Drag Race	Outstanding Host for a Reality or Reality-Competition Program	Won	
Primetime Emmy Awards	2017	RuPaul's Drag Race	Outstanding Host for a Reality or Reality-Competition Program	Won	
Primetime Emmy Awards	2017	RuPaul's Drag Race (Note: shared with Fenton Bailey, Randy Barbato, Tom Campbell, Steven Corfe, Michele Mills, Tim Palazzola, Pamela Post, Mandy Salangsang, and Jacqueline Wilson.)	Outstanding Reality-Competition Program	Nominated	
Primetime Emmy Awards	2017	RuPaul's Drag Race: Untucked (Note: shared with Fenton Bailey, Randy Barbato, Tom Campbell, Steven Corfe, and Kenneth Leslie.)	Outstanding Unstructured Reality Program	Nominated	
Primetime Emmy Awards	2018	RuPaul's Drag Race	Outstanding Host for a Reality or Reality-Competition Program	Won	
Primetime Emmy Awards	2018	RuPaul's Drag Race (Note: shared with Fenton Bailey, Randy Barbato, Tom Campbell, Steven Corfe, Bruce McCoy, Michele Mills, Tim Palazzola, Pamela Post, Mandy Salangsang, Thairin Smothers, Lisa Steele, and Jacqueline Wilson.)	Outstanding Reality-Competition Program	Won	
Primetime Emmy Awards	2018	RuPaul's Drag Race: Untucked (Note: shared with Fenton Bailey, Randy Barbato, Tom Campbell, Steven Corfe, San Heng, Kenneth Leslie, Tim Palazzola, Pamela Post, and Thairin Smothers.)	Outstanding Unstructured Reality Program	Nominated	
Primetime Emmy Awards	2019	RuPaul's Drag Race	Outstanding Host for a Reality or Competition Program	Won	
Primetime Emmy Awards	2019	RuPaul's Drag Race (Note: shared with Fenton Bailey, Randy Barbato, Tom Campbell, Steven Corfe, Bruce McCoy, Michele Mills, Tim Palazzola, Jen Passovoy, John Polly, Pamela Post, Mandy Salangsang, Thairin Smothers, Lisa Steele, Michelle Visage, and Jacqueline Wilson.)	Outstanding Competition Program	Won	
Primetime Emmy Awards	2019	RuPaul's Drag Race: Untucked (Note: shared with Fenton Bailey, Randy Barbato, Tom Campbell, Steven Corfe, San Heng, Kenneth Leslie, Tim Palazzola, Jen Passovoy, Pamela Post, Mandy Salangsang, and Thairin Smothers.)	Outstanding Unstructured Reality Program	Nominated	
Primetime Emmy Awards	2020	RuPaul's Drag Race	Outstanding Host for a Reality or Competition Program	Won	
Primetime Emmy Awards	2020	RuPaul's Drag Race (Note: shared with Fenton Bailey, Randy Barbato, Adam Bronstein, Tom Campbell, Steven Corfe, Alicia Gargaro-Magana, Bruce McCoy, Michele Mills, Tim Palazzola, Jen Passovoy, John Polly, Pamela Post, Mandy Salangsang, Thairin Smothers, Lisa Steele, Michelle Visage, and Jacqueline Wilson.)	Outstanding Competition Program	Won	
Primetime Emmy Awards	2020	RuPaul's Drag Race: Untucked (Note: shared with Fenton Bailey, Randy Barbato, Adam Bronstein, Tom Campbell, Steven Corfe, Kenneth Leslie, Tim Palazzola, Jen Passovoy, Pamela Post, Mandy Salangsang, Thairin Smothers, and Camilo Valdes.)	Outstanding Unstructured Reality Program	Nominated	
Primetime Emmy Awards	2021	RuPaul's Drag Race	Outstanding Host for a Reality or Competition Program	Won	
Primetime Emmy Awards	2021	RuPaul's Drag Race (Note: shared with Fenton Bailey, Randy Barbato, Tom Campbell, Steven Corfe, Alicia Gargaro-Magana, Zoe Jackson, Michele Mills, Tim Palazzola, Jen Passovoy, John Polly, Mandy Salangsang, Thairin Smothers, Lisa Steele, Camilo Valdes, and Michelle Visage.)	Outstanding Competition Program	Won	
Primetime Emmy Awards	2021	RuPaul's Drag Race: Untucked (Note: shared with Fenton Bailey, Randy Barbato, Tom Campbell, Steven Corfe, San Heng, Kenneth Leslie, Tim Palazzola, Jen Passovoy, Mandy Salangsang, and Thairin Smothers.)	Outstanding Unstructured Reality Program	Won	
Primetime Emmy Awards	2022	RuPaul's Drag Race	Outstanding Host for a Reality or Competition Program	Won	
Primetime Emmy Awards	2022	RuPaul's Drag Race (Note: shared with Fenton Bailey, Randy Barbato, Tom Campbell, Steven Corfe, Alicia Gargaro-Magana, Sara Kordy, Jeremy McGovern, Michele Mills, Tim Palazzola, Jen Passovoy, John Polly, Mandy Salangsang, Michael Seligman, Thairin Smothers, Lisa Steele, Camilo Valdes, and Michelle Visage.)	Outstanding Competition Program	Nominated	
Primetime Emmy Awards	2022	RuPaul's Drag Race: Untucked (Note: shared with Fenton Bailey, Randy Barbato, Tom Campbell, Steven Corfe, Kenneth Leslie, Jeremy McGovern, Edward Paige, Tim Palazzola, Jen Passovoy, Mandy Salangsang, and Thairin Smothers.)	Outstanding Unstructured Reality Program	Nominated	
Primetime Emmy Awards	2023	RuPaul's Drag Race	Outstanding Host for a Reality or Reality Competition Program	Won	
Primetime Emmy Awards	2023	RuPaul's Drag Race (Note: shared with Fenton Bailey, Randy Barbato, Tom Campbell, Steven Corfe, Ashlei Dabney, Alicia Gargaro-Magaña, Sara Kordy, Carson Kressley, Ross Mathews, Jeremy McGovern, Michele Mills, Tim Palazzola, Jen Passovoy, John Polly, Mandy Salangsang, Michael Seligman, Thairin Smothers, Lisa Steele, Camilo Valdes, and Michelle Visage.)	Outstanding Reality Competition Program	Won	
Primetime Emmy Awards	2023	RuPaul's Drag Race: Untucked (Note: shared with Fenton Bailey, Randy Barbato, Adam Bronstein, Tom Campbell, Steven Corfe, Kenneth Leslie, Jeremy McGovern, Tim Palazzola, Jen Passovoy, Mandy Salangsang, and Thairin Smothers.)	Outstanding Unstructured Reality Program	Nominated	
Primetime Emmy Awards	2024	RuPaul's Drag Race	Outstanding Host for a Reality or Reality Competition Program	Nominated	
Primetime Emmy Awards	2024	RuPaul's Drag Race (Note: shared with Fenton Bailey, Randy Barbato, Thea Berns, Daniel Blau Rogge, Tom Campbell, Steven Corfe, Alicia Gargaro-Magaña, Julie Ha, Sara Kordy, Carson Kressley, Ross Mathews, Michele Mills, John Polly, Mandy Salangsang, Michael Seligman, Thairin Smothers, Lisa Steele, and Michelle Visage.)	Outstanding Reality Competition Program	Nominated	
Primetime Emmy Awards	2024	RuPaul's Drag Race: Untucked (Note: shared with Fenton Bailey, Randy Barbato, Daniel Blau Rogge, Adam Bronstein, Tom Campbell, Steven Corfe, Alicia Gargaro-Magaña, Julie Ha, Kenneth Leslie, Mandy Salangsang, and Thairin Smothers.)	Outstanding Unstructured Reality Program	Nominated	
Primetime Emmy Awards	2025	RuPaul's Drag Race	Outstanding Host for a Reality or Reality Competition Program	Nominated	
Primetime Emmy Awards	2025	RuPaul's Drag Race (Note: shared with Fenton Bailey, Randy Barbato, Thea Berns, Daniel Blau Rogge, Tom Campbell, Steven Corfe, Ashlei Dabney, Alicia Gargaro-Magaña, Julie Ha, Sara Kordy, Carson Kressley, Ross Mathews, Michele Mills, John Polly, Mandy Salangsang, Michael Seligman, Thairin Smothers, Lisa Steele, and Michelle Visage.)	Outstanding Reality Competition Program	Nominated	
Primetime Emmy Awards	2025	RuPaul's Drag Race: Untucked (Note: shared with Fenton Bailey, Randy Barbato, Daniel Blau Rogge, Tom Campbell, Steven Corfe, Alicia Gargaro-Magaña, Julie Ha, Natalia James, America Ruiz, Mandy Salangsang, Thairin Smothers, and Andrea Van Metter.)	Outstanding Unstructured Reality Program	Nominated	
Primetime Emmy Awards	2026	RuPaul's Drag Race	Outstanding Host for a Reality or Reality Competition Program	Nominated	
Primetime Emmy Awards	2026	RuPaul's Drag Race (Note: shared with Fenton Bailey, Randy Barbato, Daniel Blau Rogge, Thea Burns, Tom Campbell, Steven Corfe, Alicia Gargaro-Magaña, Julie Ha, Justin Healy, Sara Kordy, Michele Mills, John Polly, Teresa Powell, Mandy Salangsang, Michael Seligman, Thairin Smothers, Lisa Steele, and Michelle Visage.)	Outstanding Reality Competition Program	Nominated	
Primetime Emmy Awards	2026	RuPaul's Drag Race: Untucked (Note: shared with Fenton Bailey, Randy Barbato, Daniel Blau Rogge, Tom Campbell, Steven Corfe, Jamala Gaither, Alicia Gargaro-Magaña, Julie Ha, Justin Healy, Natalia James, Teresa Powell, America Ruiz, Mandy Salangsang, Thairin Smothers, and Andrea Van Metter.)	Outstanding Unstructured Reality Program	Nominated	
Producers Guild of America Awards	2019	RuPaul's Drag Race (Note: shared with Fenton Bailey, Randy Barbato, Tom Campbell, Steven Corfe, Bruce McCoy, Michele Mills, Jen Passovoy, Mandy Salangsang, Thairin Smothers, Lisa Steele, and Jacqueline Wilson.)	Outstanding Producer of Game & Competition Television	Won	
Producers Guild of America Awards	2020	RuPaul's Drag Race (Note: shared with Fenton Bailey, Randy Barbato, Tom Campbell, Steven Corfe, Bruce McCoy, Michele Mills, Jen Passovoy, John Polly, Mandy Salangsang, Thairin Smothers, Michelle Visage, and Jacqueline Wilson.)	Outstanding Producer of Game & Competition Television	Won	
Producers Guild of America Awards	2021	RuPaul's Drag Race (Note: shared with Fenton Bailey, Randy Barbato, Adam Bronstein, Tom Campbell, Steven Corfe, Alicia Gargaro-Magana, Michele Mills, Jen Passovoy, John Polly, Mandy Salangsang, Thairin Smothers, Lisa Steele, Michelle Visage, and Jacqueline Wilson.)	Outstanding Producer of Game & Competition Television	Won	
Producers Guild of America Awards	2022	RuPaul's Drag Race (Note: shared with Fenton Bailey, Randy Barbato, Tom Campbell, Steven Corfe, Alicia Gargaro-Magana, Zoe Jackson, Carson Kressley, Ross Mathews, Michele Mills, John Polly, Mandy Salangsang, Thairin Smothers, Lisa Steele, Camilo Valdes, and Michelle Visage.)	Outstanding Producer of Game & Competition Television	Won	
Producers Guild of America Awards	2023	RuPaul's Drag Race All Stars (Note: shared with Fenton Bailey, Randy Barbato, Tom Campbell, Steven Corfe, Alicia Gargaro-Magana, Natalia James, Ari Kolber, Sara Kordy, Carson Kressley, Ross Mathews, Jeremy McGovern, John Polly, Mandy Salangsang, Michael Seligman, Thairin Smothers, and Michelle Visage.)	Outstanding Producer of Game & Competition Television	Nominated	
Producers Guild of America Awards	2024	RuPaul's Drag Race (Note: shared with Fenton Bailey, Randy Barbato, Tom Campbell, Steven Corfe, Ashlei Dabney, Alicia Gargaro-Magana, Sara Kordy, Carson Kressley, Ross Mathews, Jeremy McGovern, Michele Mills, Tim Palazzola, Jen Passovoy, John Polly, Mandy Salangsang, Michael Seligman, Thairin Smothers, Lisa Steele, and Michelle Visage.)	Outstanding Producer of Game & Competition Television	Won	
Producers Guild of America Awards	2025	RuPaul's Drag Race	Outstanding Producer of Game & Competition Television	Nominated	
Producers Guild of America Awards	2026	RuPaul's Drag Race	Outstanding Producer of Game & Competition Television	Nominated	
TCA Awards	2014	RuPaul's Drag Race	Outstanding Achievement in Reality Programming	Won	
TCA Awards	2015	RuPaul's Drag Race	Outstanding Achievement in Reality Programming	Nominated	
TCA Awards	2018	RuPaul's Drag Race	Outstanding Achievement in Reality Programming	Nominated	
TCA Awards	2023	RuPaul's Drag Race	Outstanding Achievement in Reality Programming	Nominated	
TCA Awards	2025	RuPaul's Drag Race	Outstanding Achievement in Reality Programming	Nominated	
TCA Awards	2026	RuPaul's Drag Race	Outstanding Achievement in Reality Programming	Nominated	
Tony Awards	2022	A Strange Loop	Best Musical	Won	
Tony Awards	2023	Ain't No Mo' (Note: shared with the producers of Ain't No Mo'.)	Best Play	Nominated	

== See also ==
- List of awards and nominations received by RuPaul's Drag Race
