= 8th Critics Choice Real TV Awards =

2026 American television awards

8th Critics' Choice Real TV Awards
- Date: June 3, 2026
- Country: United States
- Presented by: Broadcast Television Journalists Association; NPACT
- Most wins: The Traitors (5)
- Most nominations: The Traitors (6)
- Website: www.criticschoice.com/critics-choice-real-tv-awards/

The 8th Critics' Choice Real TV Awards, presented by the Broadcast Television Journalists Association and NPACT, recognizes excellence in nonfiction, unscripted and reality programming across broadcast, cable and streaming platforms during the 2025–26 television schedule. The winners were announced on the Critics Choice Association's website on June 3, 2026.

== Winners and nominees ==
The nominations were announced on April 30, 2026. Peacock reality competition series The Traitors led the nominations with six, followed by Dancing with the Stars and RuPaul's Drag Race with four each. Netflix received the most nominations among television networks and streaming services with 18, followed by Bravo with 12 and ABC with 10.

Winners are listed first, highlighted in boldface, and indicated with a double dagger (‡).

=== Programs ===
**Best Competition Series**: **The Traitors (Peacock)** ‡; Finding Mr. Christmas (Hallmark Channel); RuPaul's Drag Race (MTV); Squid Game: The Challenge (Netflix); Survivor 50: In the Hands of the Fans (CBS); Top Chef (Bravo)	**Best Competition Series: Talent/Variety**: **Dancing with the Stars (ABC)** ‡; America's Got Talent (NBC); American Idol (ABC); The Boulet Brothers' Dragula: Titans (Shudder); KPopped (Apple TV+); The Voice (NBC)
**Best Unstructured Series**: **Love on the Spectrum (Netflix)** ‡; Below Deck Down Under (Bravo); Deadliest Catch (Discovery); Neighbors (HBO); The Real Housewives of Rhode Island (Bravo); The Real Housewives of Salt Lake City (Bravo)	**Best Structured Series**: **Couples Therapy (Paramount+) (TIE)** ‡; **Diners, Drive-Ins, and Dives (Food Network) (TIE)** ‡; Age of Attraction (Netflix); It's Florida, Man (HBO); Love Is Blind (Netflix); Queer Eye (Netflix)
**Best Culinary Show**: **The Great British Baking Show (Netflix) (TIE)** ‡; **Top Chef (Bravo) (TIE)** ‡; America's Culinary Cup (CBS); Be My Guest with Ina Garten (Food Network); Magnolia Table: At the Farm (Magnolia Network); Tucci in Italy (National Geographic)	**Best Game Show**: **Jeopardy! (Syndicated)** ‡; Celebrity Family Feud (ABC); The Floor (Fox); Match Game (ABC); The Wall (NBC); Wheel of Fortune (Syndicated)
**Best Travel/Adventure Show**: **Tucci in Italy (National Geographic)** ‡; The Amazing Race (CBS); Expedition Unknown (Discovery); The Reluctant Traveler (Apple TV+); Solo Traveling with Tracee Ellis Ross (Roku Channel); Somebody Feed Phil (Netflix)	**Best Business Show**: **Shark Tank (ABC)** ‡; Bar Rescue (Paramount Network); The Fixer (Fox); On Brand with Jimmy Fallon (NBC); Maxxed Out (OWN)
**Best Animal/Nature Show**: **Secrets of the Bees (National Geographic)** ‡; Born to Be Wild (Apple TV+); Kingdom (BBC America); Prehistoric Planet: Ice Age (Apple TV+); Underdogs (National Geographic); The Wild Ones (Apple TV+)	**Best Crime/Justice Show**: **Trust Me: The False Prophet (Netflix)** ‡; The Curious Case Of... (Investigation Discovery); Equal Justice with Judge Eboni K. Williams (Syndicated); Naming the Dead (National Geographic); Surviving Mormonism with Heather Gay (Bravo); Trafficked with Mariana van Zeller (National Geographic)
**Best Sports Show**: **30 for 30 (ESPN)** ‡; Formula 1: Drive to Survive (Netflix); Hard Knocks (HBO); Quarterback (Netflix); Untold (Netflix); Welcome to Wrexham (FXX/Hulu)	**Best Sports Show: Talk/Analysis**: **Inside the NBA (ESPN/ABC)** ‡; The Dan Patrick Show (Peacock); Good Sports with Kevin Hart and Kenan Thompson (Prime Video); Pardon the Interruption (ESPN); The Pat McAfee Show (ESPN); The Rich Eisen Show (Disney+/ESPN+)
**Best Lifestyle Show: Home/Garden**: **Ugliest House in America (HGTV)** ‡; Bargain Block (HGTV); Castle Impossible (HGTV); Home Town (HGTV); The Last Wright: Building the Final Home Design of America’s Greatest Architect (Magnolia Network); That Thrifting Show with Lara Spencer (Freeform)	**Best Lifestyle Show: Fashion/Beauty**: **RuPaul's Drag Race (MTV)** ‡; Botched Presents: Plastic Surgery Rewind (E!); Dr. Pimple Popper: Breaking Out (Lifetime); Project Runway (Freeform); Queer Eye (Netflix)
**Best Relationship Show**: **Love on the Spectrum (Netflix)** ‡; Age of Attraction (Netflix); Couples Therapy (Paramount+); Farmer Wants a Wife (Fox); Love Is Blind (Netflix); Neighbors (HBO)	**Best Limited Series**: **Mr. Scorsese (Apple TV+)** ‡; Boy Band Confidential: A Hollywood Demons Event (Investigation Discovery); Death in Apartment 603: What Happened to Ellen Greenberg? (Hulu); Reality Check: Inside America's Next Top Model (Netflix); Sean Combs: The Reckoning (Netflix); Trust Me: The False Prophet (Netflix)

=== Personalities ===
**Best Ensemble Cast in an Unscripted Series**: **The Traitors (Peacock)** ‡; Dancing with the Stars (ABC); Finding Mr. Christmas (Hallmark Channel); House of Villains (Peacock); The Real Housewives of Rhode Island (Bravo); Summer House (Bravo)	**Best Show Host**: **Alan Cumming – The Traitors (Peacock)** ‡; Jonathan Bennett – Finding Mr. Christmas (Hallmark Channel); Kristen Kish – Top Chef (Bravo); Padma Lakshmi – America's Culinary Cup (CBS); Joel McHale – House of Villains (Peacock); RuPaul – RuPaul's Drag Race (MTV)
**Male Star of the Year**: **Rob Rausch – The Traitors (Peacock)** ‡; Alan Cumming – The Traitors (Peacock); Chris Hemsworth – Limitless: Live Better Now (National Geographic); Robert Irwin – Dancing with the Stars (ABC); Ryan Seacrest – American Idol (ABC) and Wheel of Fortune (Syndicated); Stanley Tucci – Tucci in Italy (National Geographic)	**Female Star of the Year**: **Lisa Rinna – The Traitors (Peacock)** ‡; Heather Gay – The Real Housewives of Salt Lake City (Bravo) and Surviving Mormonism with Heather Gay (Bravo); Whitney Leavitt – Dancing with the Stars (ABC) and The Secret Lives of Mormon Wives (Hulu); Dr. Sandra Lee – Dr. Pimple Popper: Breaking Out (Lifetime); Ciara Miller – Summer House (Bravo); Tiffany "New York" Pollard – House of Villains (Peacock)

== Programs with multiple nominations and awards ==
Programs that received multiple nominations
Nominations	Program	Network
6	The Traitors	Peacock
4	Dancing with the Stars	ABC
4	RuPaul's Drag Race	MTV
3	Finding Mr. Christmas	Hallmark Channel
3	Tucci in Italy	National Geographic
3	Top Chef	Bravo
2	America's Culinary Cup	CBS
2	Couples Therapy	Paramount+
2	Dr. Pimple Popper: Breaking Out	Lifetime
2	Love Is Blind	Netflix
2	Love on the Spectrum	Netflix
2	Neighbors	HBO
2	Queer Eye	Netflix
2	The Real Housewives of Rhode Island	Bravo
2	The Real Housewives of Salt Lake City	Bravo
2	Surviving Mormonism with Heather Gay	Bravo
2	Trust Me: The False Prophet	Netflix
2	Wheel of Fortune	Syndicated

Programs that received multiple wins
Awards	Program	Network
5	The Traitors	Peacock
2	Love on the Spectrum	Netflix
