= List of awards and nominations received by RuPaul's Drag Race =

RuPaul's Drag Race
Awards and nominations
Award	Wins	Nominations
Critics' Choice Television Awards	1	5
Critics' Choice Real TV Awards	7	24
Dorian Awards	4	13
GLAAD Media Award	2	4
MTV Movie & TV Awards	6	12
Primetime Emmy Awards	27	71
TCA Awards	1	3

Totals (Note: Certain award groups do not simply award one winner. They acknowledge several different recipients, have runners-up, and have third place. Since this is a specific recognition and is different from losing an award, runner-up mentions are considered wins in this award tally. For simplification and to avoid errors, each award in this list has been presumed to have had a prior nomination.)
- Wins: 78
- Nominations: 228

RuPaul's Drag Race is an American reality series wherein RuPaul and a panel of judges set contestants drag-related challenges. The program has received several awards and nominations including twenty-seven Primetime Emmy Awards, three Producers Guild of America Awards, six MTV Movie & TV Awards and two GLAAD Media Awards, among others.

The show was first aired in 2009 on Logo TV, the following year it won Outstanding Reality Program at the 21st GLAAD Media Awards while in 2011 it received its first Critics' Choice Television Award nomination for Best Reality Series – Competition. The program continued to be recognized at the Critics' Choice Television Awards, with RuPaul receiving nominations for Best Reality Show Host in 2012, 2014 and 2018, winning the latter.

In 2014, the show won the TCA Award for Outstanding Achievement in Reality Programming while in 2015 it received its first Primetime Emmy Award nomination with Mathu Andersen being nominated for Outstanding Makeup for a Multi-Camera Series or Special (Non-Prosthetic) for his work in the seventh season episode "ShakesQueer". The next year, RuPaul won the Primetime Emmy Award for Outstanding Host for a Reality or Competition Program, the first of eight consecutive wins in the category.

In 2017 the program moved to VH1 which brought more exposure to the program and made it a frequent nominee at the Primetime Emmy Awards receiving several awards and nominations for each season ever since. In 2018, the program won the Primetime Emmy Award for Outstanding Reality Competition Program, an award it has won four consecutive times. The program has also received nominations from several guilds such as the Art Directors Guild, the Costume Designers Guild and the Make-Up Artists and Hair Stylists Guild.

Some segments of the program have also been recognized. The Untucked series won Best Unstructured Series at the 4th Critics' Choice Real TV Awards and Outstanding Unstructured Reality Program at the 73rd Primetime Creative Arts Emmy Awards. The Whatcha Packin' series, hosted by Michelle Visage was nominated for the Primetime Emmy Award for Outstanding Short Form Nonfiction or Reality Series in 2022.

== Artios Awards ==
Year	Category	Nominated work	Result	Ref.
2018	Outstanding Achievement in Casting – Reality Series	Goloka Bolte, Ethan Petersen	Nominated	
2019	Outstanding Achievement in Casting – Reality Series	Goloka Bolte, Ethan Petersen	Nominated	
2020	Outstanding Achievement in Casting – Reality Series	Goloka Bolte, Ethan Petersen	Nominated	
2022	Outstanding Achievement in Casting – Reality Series	Goloka Bolte, Ethan Petersen	Won	
2024	Outstanding Achievement in Casting – Reality Series (Competition)	Goloka Bolte, Ethan Petersen	Won	
2025	Outstanding Achievement in Casting – Reality Series (Competition)	Goloka Bolte, Ethan Petersen	Won	

== Art Directors Guild Awards ==
Year	Category	Nominated work	Result	Ref.
2021	Excellence in Production Design for a Variety, Reality or Competition Series	James McGowan (for "Condragulations", "Bossy Rossy RuBoot", "Gettin' Lucky")	Nominated	
2022	Excellence in Production Design for a Variety, Reality or Competition Series	Gianna Costa (for "Catwalk", "60s Girl Groups", "The Daytona Wind")	Nominated	
2023	Excellence in Production Design for a Variety, Reality or Competition Series	Gianna Costa (for "Blame It on the Edit")	Nominated	
2024	Excellence in Production Design for a Variety, Reality or Competition Series	Gianna Costa, Jen Chu (for "RDR Live!", "Werq the World")	Nominated	

== Astra Creative Arts TV Awards ==
Year	Category	Nominated work	Result	Ref.
2023	Best Cable Reality or Competition Series	RuPaul's Drag Race	Won	
2023	Best Cable Reality or Competition Series	RuPaul's Drag Race: Untucked	Nominated	
2023	Best Talk Series	RuPaul's Drag Race: The Pit Stop with Bianca del Rio	Nominated	
2023	Best Short Form Series	RuPaul's Drag Race's Whatcha Packin' with Michelle Visage	Nominated	
2023	Best Contemporary Costumes	RuPaul's Drag Race	Won	

== Costume Designers Guild Awards ==
Year	Category	Nominated work	Result	Ref.
2018	Excellence in Variety, Reality-Competition, Live Television	Zaldy	Won	
2019	Excellence in Variety, Reality-Competition, Live Television	Zaldy (for "Whatcha Unpackin?")	Nominated	

== Critics' Choice Television Awards ==
The Critics' Choice Television Awards are presented annually since 2011 by the Broadcast Television Journalists Association. The awards were launched "to enhance access for broadcast journalists covering the television industry".

Year	Category	Nominated work	Result	Ref.
2011	Best Reality Series – Competition	RuPaul's Drag Race	Nominated	
2012	Best Reality Show Host	RuPaul	Nominated	
2014	Best Reality Show Host	RuPaul	Nominated	
2018	Best Reality Show Host	RuPaul	Won	
2018	Best Reality Series – Competition	RuPaul's Drag Race	Nominated	

=== Critics' Choice Real TV Awards ===
The Critics' Choice Real TV Awards, presented by the Broadcast Television Journalists Association and NPACT, which recognizes excellence in nonfiction, unscripted and reality programming across broadcast, cable and streaming platforms.

Year	Category	Nominated work	Result	Ref.
2019	Best Competition Series	RuPaul's Drag Race	Won	
2019	Best Unstructured Series	RuPaul's Drag Race: Untucked	Nominated	
2019	Ensemble Cast in an Unscripted Series	RuPaul's Drag Race	Nominated	
2019	Show Host	RuPaul	Nominated	
2019	Female Star of the Year	Michelle Visage	Nominated	
2019	Male Star of the Year	RuPaul	Nominated	
2020	Best Competition Series	RuPaul's Drag Race	Won	
2020	Best Unstructured Series	RuPaul's Drag Race: Untucked	Nominated	
2020	Ensemble Cast in an Unscripted Series	RuPaul's Drag Race	Nominated	
2020	Show Host	RuPaul	Nominated	
2020	Female Star of the Year	Michelle Visage	Nominated	
2020	Male Star of the Year	RuPaul	Nominated	
2021	Best Competition Series	RuPaul's Drag Race	Won	
2021	Best Unstructured Series	RuPaul's Drag Race: Untucked	Nominated	
2021	Ensemble Cast in an Unscripted Series	RuPaul's Drag Race	Won	
2021	Show Host	RuPaul	Nominated	
2021	Female Star of the Year	Michelle Visage	Nominated	
2021	Male Star of the Year	RuPaul	Nominated	
2022	Best Competition Series	RuPaul's Drag Race	Won (Note: Tied with Top Chef)	
2022	Best Unstructured Series	RuPaul's Drag Race: Untucked	Won	
2022	Best Ensemble Cast in an Unscripted Series	RuPaul's Drag Race	Won	
2022	Best Show Host	RuPaul	Nominated	
2022	Male Star of the Year	RuPaul	Nominated	
2022	Outstanding Achievement in Nonfiction Production	World of Wonder	Nominated	

== Dorian Awards ==
The Dorian Awards are presented by GALECA: The Society of LGBTQ Entertainment Critics and go to film and television both mainstream and LGBTQ-centric.

Year	Category	Nominated work	Result	Ref.
2011	LGBT-Themed Show of the Year	RuPaul's Drag Race	Nominated	
2012	LGBT-Themed Show of the Year	RuPaul's Drag Race	Nominated	
2014	LGBT Show of the Year	RuPaul's Drag Race	Nominated	
2017	LGBTQ TV Show of the Year	RuPaul's Drag Race All Stars	Nominated	
2017	Campy TV Show of the Year	RuPaul's Drag Race All Stars	Won	
2018	LGBTQ TV Show of the Year	RuPaul's Drag Race	Won	
2018	Campy TV Show of the Year	RuPaul's Drag Race	Nominated	
2018	TV Musical Performance of the Year	Sasha Velour, “So Emotional,” RuPaul's Drag Race	Nominated	
2019	Campy TV Show of the Year	RuPaul's Drag Race	Won	
2020	Campy TV Show of the Year	RuPaul's Drag Race	Nominated	
2020	Best LGBTQ TV Show	RuPaul's Drag Race	Nominated	
2020	Campiest TV Show	RuPaul's Drag Race	Nominated	
2021	Best Reality Show	RuPaul's Drag Race	Won	

- Note: From 2009, the group honored film and TV together, but in 2020 began to award movies and programs at separate times of the year. This explains the overlap of award categories that year.

== GLAAD Awards ==
Year	Category	Nominated work	Result	Ref.
2010	Outstanding Reality Competition Program	RuPaul's Drag Race	Won	
2019	Outstanding Reality Competition Program	RuPaul's Drag Race	Nominated	
2021	Outstanding Reality Competition Program	RuPaul's Drag Race	Nominated	
2022	Outstanding Reality Competition Program	RuPaul's Drag Race	Won	
2023	Outstanding Reality Competition Program	RuPaul's Drag Race	Nominated	
2024	Outstanding Reality Competition Program	RuPaul's Drag Race	Won	

== Astra TV Awards / Hollywood Critics Association TV Awards ==
Known as the Hollywood Critics Association TV Awards for first and second edition, then as the Astra TV Awards starting in 2023.

Year	Category	Nominated work	Result	Ref.
2021	Best Broadcast Network or Cable Docuseries, Documentary Television Movie, or Non-Fiction Series	RuPaul's Drag Race: Untucked!	Nominated	
2021	Best Cable or Streaming Reality Series, Competition Series, or Game Show	RuPaul's Drag Race	Won	
2022	Best Cable Reality Show or Competition Series	RuPaul's Drag Race	Won	
2022	Best Streaming Reality Show or Competition Series	RuPaul's Drag Race All Stars	Nominated	
2024	Best Competition Series	RuPaul's Drag Race	Won	
2024	Best Reality Series	RuPaul's Drag Race	Won	
2024	Best Short Form	RuPaul's Drag Race: Fashion Photo Ruview	Nominated	
2025	Best Reality Competition Series	RuPaul's Drag Race	Nominated	

== Make-Up Artists and Hair Stylists Guild Awards ==
Year	Category	Nominated work	Result	Ref.
2020	Best Contemporary Makeup in a Television Series, Limited or Miniseries or Television New Media Series	Natasha Marcelina, Jen Fregozo	Nominated	
2020	Best Contemporary Hair Styling in a Television Series, Limited or Miniseries or Television New Media Series	Curtis Foreman, Ryan Randall	Nominated	
2021	Best Contemporary Makeup in a Television Series, Limited or Miniseries or Television New Media Series	David Petruschin, Jen Fregozo, Nicole Faulkner	Nominated	
2021	Best Contemporary Hair Styling in a Television Series, Limited or Miniseries or Television New Media Series	Curtis Foreman, Ryan Randall	Nominated	

== MTV Movie & TV Awards ==
Year	Category	Nominated work	Result	Ref.
2017	Best Reality Competition	RuPaul's Drag Race	Won	
2017	Best Host	RuPaul	Nominated	
2018	Best Reality Series/Franchise	RuPaul's Drag Race	Nominated	
2019	Best Host	RuPaul	Nominated	
2019	Best Meme-able Moment	Asia O'Hara's butterfly finale fail	Nominated	
2021	Best Competition Series	RuPaul's Drag Race	Won	
2021	Best Reality Cast	RuPaul's Drag Race	Won	
2021	Best Host	RuPaul	Won	
2022	Best Competition Series	RuPaul's Drag Race	Won	
2022	Best Host	RuPaul	Nominated	
2022	Best Reality Star	Willow Pill	Nominated	
2022	Best Fight	Bosco vs. Lady Camden	Won	

== NAACP Image Awards ==
Year	Category	Nominated work	Result	Ref.
2021	Outstanding Host in a Reality/Reality Competition, Game Show or Variety (Series or Special) - Individual or Ensemble	RuPaul	Nominated	
2024	Outstanding Host in a Reality/Reality Competition, Game Show or Variety (Series or Special) - Individual or Ensemble	RuPaul	Nominated	
2024	Outstanding Short-Form Series - Reality/Nonfiction	RuPaul's Drag Race	Nominated	

== NewNowNext Awards ==
Year	Category	Nominated work	Result	Ref.
2009	Most Addictive Reality Star	Ongina	Won	
2010	Best New Indulgence	RuPaul's Drag Race	Won	
2010	Most Addictive Reality Star	Jujubee	Nominated	
2011	Most Addictive Reality Star	Carmen Carrera	Nominated	
2012	Most Addictive Reality Star	Willam	Nominated	
2014	Best New TV Personality	Bianca Del Rio	Won	

== People's Choice Awards ==
Year	Category	Nominated work	Result	Ref.
2018	Competition Show	RuPaul's Drag Race	Nominated	
2019	Competition Show	RuPaul's Drag Race	Nominated	
2019	Competition Contestant	Vanessa Vanjie Mateo	Nominated	
2020	Competition Show	RuPaul's Drag Race	Nominated	
2020	Competition Contestant	Jaida Essence Hall	Nominated	
2020	Competition Contestant	Gigi Goode	Won	
2021	Competition Show	RuPaul's Drag Race	Nominated	
2021	Competition Contestant	Gottmik	Nominated	
2021	Competition Contestant	Symone	Nominated	
2022	Competition Show	RuPaul's Drag Race	Nominated	
2022	Competition Contestant	Bosco	Nominated	
2022	Competition Contestant	Willow Pill	Nominated	
2024	The Competition Show of the Year	RuPaul's Drag Race	Nominated	
2024	The Competition Contestant of the Year	Anetra	Nominated	
2024	The Competition Contestant of the Year	Sasha Colby	Nominated	
2024	The Host of the Year	RuPaul	Nominated	

== Primetime Emmy Awards ==
The Primetime Emmy Awards are given by the Academy of Television Arts & Sciences, an organisation founded in 1946, for television shows broadcast or available for download and streaming in America. The main award ceremony is the Primetime Emmy Award, whilst Creative Arts Emmy Awards are given in technical, creative, and craft categories, and International Emmy Awards are presented to shows airing outside of the US.

Year	Category	Nominated work	Result	Ref.
2015	Outstanding Makeup for a Multi-Camera Series or Special (Non-Prosthetic)	Mathu Andersen (for "ShakesQueer")	Nominated	
2016	Outstanding Host for a Reality or Reality-Competition Program	RuPaul	Won	
2016	Outstanding Costumes for a Variety, Nonfiction, or Reality Program	Zaldy (for "Keeping It 100!")	Nominated	
2017	Outstanding Competition Program	RuPaul's Drag Race	Nominated	
2017	Outstanding Unstructured Reality Program	RuPaul's Drag Race: Untucked	Nominated	
2017	Outstanding Host for a Reality or Reality-Competition Program	RuPaul	Won	
2017	Outstanding Casting for a Reality Program	Goloka Bolte and Ethan Petersen	Nominated	
2017	Outstanding Costumes for a Variety, Nonfiction, or Reality Program	Zaldy and Perry Meek (for "Oh. My. Gaga!")	Won	
2017	Outstanding Hairstyling for a Multi-Camera Series or Special	Hector Pocasangre (for "Oh. My. Gaga!")	Nominated	
2017	Outstanding Makeup for a Multi-Camera Series or Special (Non-Prosthetic)	Jen Fregozo, Nicole Faulkner and Natasha Marcelina (for "Oh. My. Gaga!")	Nominated	
2017	Outstanding Picture Editing for a Structured or Competition Reality Program	Jamie Martin, John Lim and Michael Roha (for "Oh. My. Gaga!")	Won	
2018	Outstanding Reality-Competition Program	RuPaul's Drag Race	Won	
2018	Outstanding Unstructured Reality Program	RuPaul's Drag Race: Untucked	Nominated	
2018	Outstanding Host for a Reality or Reality-Competition Program	RuPaul	Won	
2018	Outstanding Directing for a Reality Program	Nick Murray (for "10s Across the Board")	Won	
2018	Outstanding Casting for a Reality Program	Goloka Bolte and Ethan Petersen	Nominated	
2018	Outstanding Cinematography for a Reality Program	Michael Jacob Kerber (for "10s Across the Board")	Nominated	
2018	Outstanding Costumes for a Variety, Nonfiction, or Reality Program	Zaldy (for "10s Across the Board" / Costumes: RuPaul's gowns")	Won	
2018	Outstanding Makeup for a Multi-Camera Series or Special (Non-Prosthetic)	Nicole Faulkner, Jen Fregozo, Natasha Marcelina and David Petruschin (for "10s Across the Board)	Nominated	
2018	Outstanding Picture Editing for a Structured or Competition Reality Program	Jamie Martin, Drew Forni, John Lim and Michael Roha (for "10s Across the Board")	Nominated	
2018	Outstanding Hairstyling for a Multi-Camera Series or Special	Hector Pocasangre and Gabriel Villarreal (for "10s Across the Board")	Won	
2018	Outstanding Creative Achievement in Interactive Media Within an Unscripted Program	Sarah DeFilippis, Brittany Travis, Ray Hunt, Jackie Rappaport and Courtney Powell (for "Season 10 Ruveal")	Nominated	
2018	Outstanding Picture Editing for an Unstructured Program	Lousine Shamamian (for RuPaul's Drag Race: Untucked – "10s Across the Board")	Nominated	
2019	Outstanding Competition Program	RuPaul's Drag Race	Won	
2019	Outstanding Unstructured Reality Program	RuPaul's Drag Race: Untucked	Nominated	
2019	Outstanding Short Form Nonfiction or Reality Series	RuPaul's Drag Race: Out of the Closet	Nominated	
2019	Outstanding Short Form Nonfiction or Reality Series	RuPaul's Drag Race: Portrait of a Queen	Nominated	
2019	Outstanding Host for a Reality or Reality-Competition Program	RuPaul	Won	
2019	Outstanding Directing for a Reality Program	Nick Murray (for "Whatcha Unpackin?")	Nominated	
2019	Outstanding Casting for a Reality Program	Goloka Bolte and Ethan Petersen	Nominated	
2019	Outstanding Cinematography for a Reality Program	Jake Kerber (for "Trump: The Rusical")	Nominated	
2019	Outstanding Costumes for a Variety, Nonfiction, or Reality Program	Zaldy Goco (Costumes: RuPaul) and Art Conn (Costumes: Michelle Visage) (for "Trump: The Rusical")	Won	
2019	Outstanding Hairstyling for a Multi-Camera Series or Special	Hector Pocasangre (for "Trump: The Rusical")	Won	
2019	Outstanding Makeup for a Multi-Camera Series or Special (Non-Prosthetic)	Adam Burrell, Nicole Faulkner, Jen Fregozo, Natasha Marcelia and Karen Mitchell (for "Trump: The Rusical")	Nominated	
2019	Outstanding Picture Editing for a Structured or Competition Reality Program	Jamie Martin, Michael Lynn Deis, Julie Tseselsky Kirschner, John Lim, Ryan Mallick, Michael Roha and Corey Ziemniak	Nominated	
2019	Outstanding Picture Editing for an Unstructured Program	Kendra Pasker, Shayna Casey and Stavros Stavropoulos (for RuPaul's Drag Race: Untucked)	Nominated	
2020	Outstanding Competition Program	RuPaul's Drag Race	Won	
2020	Outstanding Unstructured Reality Program	RuPaul's Drag Race: Untucked	Nominated	
2020	Outstanding Short Form Nonfiction or Reality Series	RuPaul's Drag Race: Out of the Closet	Nominated	
2020	Outstanding Host for a Reality or Reality-Competition Program	RuPaul	Won	
2020	Outstanding Directing for a Reality Program	Nick Murray (for "I'm That Bitch")	Nominated	
2020	Outstanding Casting for a Reality Program	Goloka Bolte and Ethan Petersen	Won	
2020	Outstanding Cinematography for a Reality Program	Michael Jacob Kerber, Jon Schneider, Jay Mack Arnette II, Mario Panagiotopoulos, Gregory Montes, Brett Smith, David McCoul and Justin Umphenour	Nominated	
2020	Outstanding Costumes for a Variety, Nonfiction, or Reality Program	Zaldy Goco (for "I'm That Bitch")	Nominated	
2020	Outstanding Contemporary Hairstyling for a Variety, Nonfiction or Reality Program	Curtis Foreman and Ryan Randall (for "I'm That Bitch")	Won	
2020	Outstanding Contemporary Makeup for a Variety, Nonfiction or Reality Program (Non-Prosthetic)	Natasha Marcelina, David Petruschin, Jen Fregozo and Nicole Faulkner (for "I'm That Bitch")	Won	
2020	Outstanding Picture Editing for a Structured or Competition Reality Program	Jamie Martin, Michael Roha, Paul Cross, Michael Deis and Ryan Mallick (for "I'm That Bitch")	Won	
2020	Outstanding Sound Mixing for a Nonfiction or Reality Program (Single or Multi-Camera)	Glenn Gaines, Ryan Brady, Erik Valenzuela, Sal Ojeda (for "I'm That Bitch")	Nominated	
2020	Outstanding Picture Editing for an Unstructured Program	Kendra Pasker, Yali Sharon, Kate Smith (for RuPaul's Drag Race: Untucked "The Ball Ball")	Nominated	
2021	Outstanding Competition Program	RuPaul's Drag Race	Won	
2021	Outstanding Unstructured Reality Program	RuPaul's Drag Race Untucked	Won	
2021	Outstanding Production Design for a Variety, Reality or Competition Series	James McGowan and Gianna Costa (for "Condragulations"/"Bossy Rossy RuBoot")	Nominated	
2021	Outstanding Casting for a Reality Program	Goloka Bolte and Ethan Petersen	Won	
2021	Outstanding Cinematography for a Reality Program	Michael Jacob Kerber, Jay Mack Arnette II, Jason Cooley, Pauline Edwards, Ade Oyebade, Mario Panagiotopoulos, Jon "Sarge" Schneider, Brett Smith, Justin Umphenour	Nominated	
2021	Outstanding Directing for a Reality Program	Nick Murray (for "Gettin' Lucky")	Won	
2021	Outstanding Picture Editing for a Structured Reality or Competition Program	Jamie Martin, Paul Cross, Ryan Mallick, Michael Roha (for "Condragulations")	Won	
2021	Outstanding Picture Editing for an Unstructured Reality Program	Kellen Cruden, Yali Sharon, Shayna Casey (for RuPaul's Drag Race: Untucked "The Bag Ball")	Nominated	
2021	Outstanding Contemporary Hairstyling for a Variety, Nonfiction or Reality Program	Curtis Foreman and Ryan Randall (for "The Pork Chop")	Nominated	
2021	Outstanding Contemporary Makeup for a Variety, Nonfiction or Reality Program (Non-Prosthetic)	David "Raven" Petruschin, Nicole Faulkner and Jen Fregozo (for "The Pork Chop")	Nominated	
2021	Outstanding Host for a Reality or Competition Program	RuPaul	Won	
2022	Outstanding Competition Program	RuPaul's Drag Race	Nominated	
2022	Outstanding Unstructured Reality Program	RuPaul's Drag Race: Untucked	Nominated	
2022	Outstanding Sound Mixing for a Nonfiction or Reality Program (Single or Multi-Camera)	Erik Valenzuela, Davild Nolte and Glenn Gaines (for "Big Opening #1")	Nominated	
2022	Outstanding Casting for a Reality Program	Goloka Bolte and Ethan Petersen	Nominated	
2022	Outstanding Directing for a Reality Program	Nick Murray (for "Moulin Ru: The Rusical")	Nominated	
2022	Outstanding Production Design for a Variety, Reality or Competition Series	Gianna Costa and Allison Spain (for "Catwalk")	Won	
2022	Outstanding Cinematography for a Reality Program	Michael Jacob Kerber, Jay Mack Arnette II, Jason Cooley, Pauline Edwards, Mario Panagiotopoulos, Brett Smith, Jeremiah Smith, Justin Umphenour and Jon Schneider	Nominated	
2022	Outstanding Picture Editing for a Structured Reality or Competition Program	Jamie Martin, Paul Cross, Ryan Mallick and Michael Roha (for "Big Opening #1")	Nominated	
2022	Outstanding Host for a Reality or Competition Program	RuPaul	Won	
2022	Outstanding Short Form Nonfiction or Reality Series	Ray Hunt, Eric Dimitratos, Joseph Gerbino, Robert Diminico, Christina D'ambrosio and Michelle Visage (Whatcha Packin')	Nominated	
2023	Outstanding Reality Competition Program	RuPaul's Drag Race	Won	
2023	Outstanding Unstructured Reality Program	RuPaul's Drag Race: Untucked	Nominated	
2023	Outstanding Host for a Reality or Competition Program	RuPaul	Won	
2023	Outstanding Casting for a Reality Program	Ethan Petersen, Adam Cook, Michelle Redwine	Nominated	
2023	Outstanding Directing for a Reality Program	Nick Murray (for "Wigloose: The Rusical!")	Nominated	
2023	Outstanding Picture Editing for a Structured Reality or Competition Program	Jamie Martin, Paul Cross, Ryan Mallick, Michael Roha (for "Wigloose: The Rusical!")	Won	
2023	Outstanding Picture Editing for an Unstructured Reality Program	Matthew D. Miller, Kellen Cruden (RuPaul's Drag Race: Untucked) (for "The Daytona Wind 2")	Nominated	
2023	Outstanding Production Design for a Variety, Reality or Competition Series	Gianna Costa and Brad Bailey (for "Blame It on the Edit")	Nominated	
2023	Outstanding Sound Mixing for a Reality Program (Single or Multi-Camera)	Erik Valenzuela, Sal Ojeda, David Nolte, Gabe Lopez (for "Wigloose: The Rusical!")	Nominated	
2024	Outstanding Reality Competition Program	RuPaul's Drag Race	Nominated	
2024	Outstanding Unstructured Reality Program	RuPaul's Drag Race: Untucked	Nominated	
2024	Outstanding Casting for a Reality Program	Goloka Bolte, Ethan Petersen, Adam Cook, and Michelle Redwine	Nominated	
2024	Outstanding Choreography for Variety or Reality Programming	Jamal Sims Routines: "Dance!" / "Queen of Wind" / "Power"	Nominated	
2024	Outstanding Directing for a Reality Program	Nick Murray (for "Grand Finale")	Nominated	
2024	Outstanding Host for a Reality or Reality Competition Program	RuPaul	Nominated	
2024	Outstanding Picture Editing for a Structured Reality or Competition Program	Jamie Martin, Paul Cross, Ryan Mallick, and Michael Roha (for "Werq the World")	Nominated	
2024	Outstanding Picture Editing for an Unstructured Reality Program	Matthew D. Miller and Kellen Cruden (for RuPaul's Drag Race: Untucked) (for "Rate-a-Queen")	Nominated	
2024	Outstanding Production Design for a Variety or Reality Series	Gianna Costa, Jen Chu, and Gavin Smith (for "RDR Live!" / "Werq the World")	Nominated	
2024	Outstanding Sound Mixing for a Reality Program	Sal Ojeda, Erik Valenzuela, Ryan Brady, David Nolte, and Andrew Papastephanou	Nominated	
2025	Outstanding Host for a Reality or Reality Competition Program	RuPaul	Nominated	
2025	Outstanding Casting for a Reality Program	Goloka Bolte, Adam Cook, Michelle Redwin	Nominated	
2025	Outstanding Reality Competition Program	Fenton Bailey, Randy Barbato, Tom Campbell, RuPaul, Mandy Salangsang, Steven Corfe, Michele Mills, Daniel Blau Rogge, Sara Kordy, John Polly, Thairin Smothers, Lisa Steele, Michelle Visage, Julie Ha, Alicia Gargaro-Magana, Carson Kressley, Ross Mathews, Thea Berns, Ashlei Dabney	Nominated	
2025	Outstanding Lighting Design/Lighting Direction for a Series	Gus Dominguez, Thomas Schneider, Darren Barr, Steve Moreno (for "The Wicked Wiz of Oz: The Rusical!")	Nominated	
2025	Outstanding Makeup for a Variety, Nonfiction or Reality Program	Natasha Marcelina, David Petruschin, Jen Fregozo, Nicole Faulkner (for "Bitch, I'm a Drag Queen!")	Nominated	
2025	Outstanding Directing for a Reality Program	Nick Murray (for "Squirrel Games")	Nominated	
2025	Outstanding Production Design for a Variety or Reality Series	Jen Chu and Gavin Smith (for "RDR Live!")	Nominated	
2025	Outstanding Picture Editing for a Structured Reality or Competition Program	Jamie Martin, Paul Cross, Ryan Mallick, Michael Roha (for "Squirrel Games")	Nominated	
2025	Outstanding Picture Editing for an Unstructured Reality Program	Miguel Siqueiros, Jimmy Bazan and Johanna Gavard (for RuPaul's Drag Race: Untucked) (for "Drag Baby Mamas")	Nominated	
2025	Outstanding Unstructured Reality Program	Fenton Bailey, Randy Barbato, Tom Campbell, RuPaul Charles, Andrea Van Metter, Mandy Salangsang, Steven Corfe, Daniel Blau Rogge, Natalia James, Thairin Smothers, Julie Ha, Alicia Gargaro-Magana and America Ruiz (for RuPaul's Drag Race: Untucked)	Nominated	

== Producers Guild of America Awards ==
Year	Category	Nominated work	Result	Ref.
2019	Outstanding Producer of Game & Competition Television	Fenton Bailey, Randy Barbato, Tom Campbell, Mandy Salangsang, RuPaul Charles, Steven Corfe, Bruce McCoy, Michele Mills, Jacqueline Wilson, Thairin Smothers, John Polly, Michelle Visage, and Jen Passovoy	Won	
2020	Outstanding Producer of Game & Competition Television	Fenton Bailey, Randy Barbato, Tom Campbell, Mandy Salangsang, RuPaul Charles, Steven Corfe, Michele Mills, Jacqueline Wilson, Thairin Smothers, Adam Bronstein, Lisa Steele, John Polly, Michelle Visage, Jen Passovoy, and Alicia Gargaro-Magana	Won	
2021	Outstanding Producer of Game & Competition Television	Fenton Bailey, Randy Barbato, Tom Campbell, RuPaul Charles, Mandy Salangsang, Steven Corfe, Michele Mills, Zoe Jackson, John Polly, Lisa Steele, Camilo Valdes, Thairin Smothers, Alicia Gargaro-Magana, Carson Kressley, Ross Mathews, and Michelle Visage	Won	
2022	Outstanding Producer of Game & Competition Television	RuPaul's Drag Race	Nominated	
2024	Outstanding Producer of Game & Competition Television	RuPaul's Drag Race	Won	

== Queerty Awards ==
Year	Category	Nominated work	Result	Ref.
2019	TV series	RuPaul's Drag Race	Won	
2022	Reality / Docuseries	RuPaul's Drag Race	Won	
2025	Reality TV	RuPaul's Drag Race	Won	

== Reality Television Awards ==
Year	Category	Nominated work	Result	Ref.
2016	Competition Show	RuPaul's Drag Race	Nominated	
2016	Creative Challenge	RuPaul's Drag Race	Won	
2016	Host	RuPaul	Won	
2017	Competition Show	RuPaul's Drag Race	Nominated	
2017	Creative Challenge	RuPaul's Drag Race	Nominated	
2017	Heartfelt Moment	RuPaul's Drag Race	Nominated	
2017	Host/Hostess	RuPaul	Nominated	
2017	Performance	Alaska	Nominated	
2017	Shocking Moment	RuPaul's Drag Race	Won	
2019	Competition Show	RuPaul's Drag Race	Nominated	
2019	Host/Hostess	RuPaul	Nominated	
2019	Judging Panel	RuPaul's Drag Race	Nominated	
2019	Overall Show	RuPaul's Drag Race	Nominated	
2019	Villain	Valentina	Nominated	
2019	Fan Favorite	Trinity the Tuck	Won	
2022	Creative Challenge	RuPaul's Drag Race	Nominated	
2023	Competition Show	RuPaul's Drag Race All Stars	Nominated	
2023	Host	RuPaul - RuPaul's Drag Race All Stars	Won	
2023	Judging Panel	RuPaul's Drag Race All Stars	Won	
2023	Overall Show	RuPaul's Drag Race All Stars	Nominated	
2023	Reality Royalty	Ross Matthews - RuPaul's Drag Race All Stars	Nominated	
2023	Reality TV Moment	RuPaul's Drag Race All Stars	Nominated	
2024	Competition Show	RuPaul's Drag Race	Nominated	
2024	Host	RuPaul	Nominated	
2024	Judging Panel	RuPaul's Drag Race	Nominated	
2024	Overall Show	RuPaul's Drag Race	Won	
2024	Reality Queen	Jimbo	Nominated	
2024	Reality TV Moment	RuPaul's Drag Race	Nominated	

== Realscreen Awards ==
Year	Category	Nominated work	Result	Ref.
2010	Best Talent/Studio-Based Programming	RuPaul's Drag Race	Won	
2012	Best Host/Presenter	RuPaul	Won	
2012	Best Talent/Studio-Based Programming	RuPaul's Drag Race	Won	
2014	Best Talent/Studio-Based Programming	RuPaul's Drag Race	Won	
2015	Best Competition: Talent & Studio-Based	RuPaul's Drag Race	Nominated	
2019	Award of Excellence: Competition	RuPaul's Drag Race	Won	
2019	Best Competition: Talent & Studio-Based	RuPaul's Drag Race	Won	
2020	Best Competition: Talent & Studio-Based	RuPaul's Drag Race	Nominated	
2020	Diversity & Inclusion	RuPaul's Drag Race	Nominated	
2021	Award of Excellence: Competition	RuPaul's Drag Race	Won	
2021	Best Competition: Talent & Studio-Based	RuPaul's Drag Race	Won	
2022	Best Competition: Talent & Studio-Based	RuPaul's Drag Race	Nominated	

== Television Critics Association Awards ==
Year	Category	Nominated work	Result	Ref.
2014	Outstanding Achievement in Reality Programming	RuPaul's Drag Race	Won	
2015	Outstanding Achievement in Reality Programming	RuPaul's Drag Race	Nominated	
2018	Outstanding Achievement in Reality Programming	RuPaul's Drag Race	Nominated	
2023	Outstanding Achievement in Reality Programming	RuPaul's Drag Race	Nominated	

== Webby Awards ==
Year	Category	Nominee(s)	Result	Ref.
2020	Social, Television & Film	RuPaul's Drag Race	Nominated	
2022	Social, Television & Film (Campaigns, People's Voice)	RuPaul's Drag Race: All Stars 6	Won	
2023	Social, Television & Film (Campaigns, People's Voice)	"RuPaul's Drag Race All Stars 7 Queen Ruveal"	Won	
2024	Social, Television & Film (Video, People's Voice)	"RuPaul's Drag Race All Stars Season 8: RuPaul's Best Laughs Ranked"	Won	
2024	Video, Long Form	The Pit Stop	Honoree	
2024	Video, Variety & Reality	The Pit Stop	Won	
2025	Interview or Talk Show, Branded Entertainment (Video & Film)	The Pit Stop	Pending	
2025	Social, Television & Film (People's Voice)	RuPaul's Drag Race All Stars 9 Ruveal	Pending	

== Other awards ==
Year	Award	Category	Nominee(s)	Result	Ref.
2012	TV.com's Best of 2012	Best Reality Show Judge/Host	RuPaul	Won	
2012	TV.com's Best of 2012	Best Reality Competition Series	RuPaul's Drag Race	Won	
2016	POPrepublic.tv Awards	Favourite International TV Shows	RuPaul's Drag Race	Nominated	
2018	MTV Millennial Awards Brazil	Best Reality	RuPaul's Drag Race	Nominated	
2022	Banff Rockie Awards	Best in Competition Series & Game Show	RuPaul's Drag Race	Won	
