= 5th Critics Choice Real TV Awards =

2023 American television awards

5th Critics' Choice Real TV Awards
- Date: June 16, 2023
- Presented by: Broadcast Television Journalists Association; NPACT
- Hosted by: Sam Rubin; Megan Henderson
- Website: www.criticschoice.com/critics-choice-real-tv-awards/

Television/radio coverage
- Network: KTLA

The 5th Critics' Choice Real TV Awards, presented by the Broadcast Television Journalists Association and NPACT, which recognizes excellence in nonfiction, unscripted and reality programming across broadcast, cable and streaming platforms, were held on June 15, 2023. The ceremony was not held in-person due to the 2023 Writers Guild of America strike, instead a television special saluting the winners was aired the day after on KTLA.

The nominations were announced on May 15, 2023, with RuPaul's Drag Race leading with five.

== Winners and nominees ==
Winners are listed first, highlighted in boldface, and indicated with a double dagger (‡).

Best Competition Series	Best Competition Series: Talent/Variety
**The Amazing Race (CBS)**‡; Lego Masters (Fox); RuPaul's Drag Race (MTV); RuPaul's Drag Race All Stars (Paramount+); Survivor (CBS); The Traitors (Peacock)	**The Voice (NBC)**‡; America's Got Talent (NBC); America's Got Talent: All-Stars (NBC); Dancing with the Stars (Disney+); The Masked Singer (Fox); My Kind of Country (Apple TV+)
Best Unstructured Series	Best Structured Series
**Vanderpump Rules (Bravo)**‡; Below Deck Sailing Yacht (Bravo); Couples Therapy (Showtime); Formula 1: Drive to Survive (Netflix); The Kardashians (Hulu); MTV's Following: Bretman Rock (MTV)	**Taste the Nation with Padma Lakshmi (Hulu)**‡; Bar Rescue (Paramount Network); Diners, Drive-Ins and Dives (Food Network); The Gentle Art of Swedish Death Cleaning (Peacock); Gutsy (Apple TV+); Shark Tank (ABC)
Best Culinary Show	Best Game Show
**Top Chef (Bravo)**‡; The Big Brunch (HBO Max); José Andrés and Family in Spain (Discovery+); Magnolia Table with Joanna Gaines (Magnolia Network); Selena + Chef (HBO Max); Taste the Nation with Padma Lakshmi (Bravo)	**Jeopardy! (Syndicated)**‡; Barmageddon (USA Network); Lingo (CBS); Password (NBC); The Wall (NBC); Weakest Link (NBC)
Best Travel/Adventure Show	Best Business Show
**The Reluctant Traveler (Apple TV+)**‡; The Great Food Truck Race (Food Network); José Andrés and Family in Spain (Discovery+); The Piece Maker (Magnolia Network); Rainn Wilson and the Geography of Bliss (Peacock); Somebody Feed Phil (Netflix)	**Shark Tank (ABC)**‡; American Greed (CNBC); Bar Rescue (Paramount Network); House Hunters (HGTV); Restaurant: Impossible (Food Network); Wahl Street (HBO Max)
Best Animal/Nature Show	Best Crime/Justice Show
**Frozen Planet II (BBC America)**‡; Big Beasts (Apple TV+); The End Is Nye (Peacock); Our Universe (Netflix); Prehistoric Planet (Apple TV+); The Wizard of Paws (BYU TV)	**Unsolved Mysteries Volume 3 (Netflix)**‡; 911 Crisis Center (Oxygen); Evil Lives Here (Investigation Discovery); How I Caught My Killer (Hulu); In Pursuit with John Walsh (Investigation Discovery / Discovery+); Web of Make Believe: Death, Lies and the Internet (Netflix)
Best Sports Show	Best Relationship Show
**Welcome to Wrexham (FX)**‡; 30 for 30 (ESPN); American Ninja Warrior (NBC); Legacy: The True Story of the LA Lakers (Hulu); Like a Girl (Fuse Media; Real Sports with Bryant Gumbel (HBO Max)	**Love Is Blind (Netflix)**‡; Farmer Wants a Wife (Fox); Indian Matchmaking (Netflix); Jewish Matchmaking (Netflix); Married at First Sight (Lifetime); The Parent Test (ABC)
Best Lifestyle Show: Home/Garden	Best Lifestyle Show: Fashion/Beauty
**Million Dollar Listing Los Angeles (Bravo)**‡; For the Love of Kitchens (Magnolia Network); Home (Apple TV+); Murder House Flip (The Roku Channel); Trixie Motel (Discovery+); Ugliest House in America (HGTV)	**Queer Eye (Netflix)**‡; Glow Up (Netflix); The Hype (HBO Max); Making the Cut (Prime Video); Next in Fashion (Netflix); Say Yes to the Dress (TLC)
Best Limited Series	Best Ensemble Cast in an Unscripted Series
**Pepsi, Where's My Jet? (Netflix)**‡; American Manhunt: The Boston Marathon Bombing (Netflix); The Hidden Lives of Pets (Netflix); House of Hammer (Discovery+); Low Country: The Murdaugh Dynasty (HBO Max); Super League: The War for Football (Apple TV+)	**RuPaul's Drag Race All Stars (Paramount+)**‡; Below Deck Sailing Yacht (Bravo); Dancing with the Stars (Disney+); Special Forces: World's Toughest Test (Fox); Survivor (CBS); Vanderpump Rules (Bravo)
Best Show Host	Star of the Year
**Padma Lakshmi – Top Chef (Bravo) and Taste the Nation with Padma Lakshmi (Hulu)**‡; **RuPaul – RuPaul's Drag Race (MTV) and RuPaul's Drag Race All Stars (Paramount+)**‡; Selena Gomez – Selena + Chef (HBO Max); Alex Guarnaschelli – Supermarket Stakeout (Food Network); Trixie Mattel – Trixie Motel (Discovery+); Ryan Seacrest – American Idol (ABC)	**Eugene Levy – The Reluctant Traveler (Apple TV+)**‡; Guy Fieri – Diners, Drive-Ins and Dives (Food Network); Ina Garten – Barefoot Contessa (Food Network) and Be My Guest with Ina Garten (Food Network); Selena Gomez – Selena + Chef (HBO Max); Padma Lakshmi – Top Chef (Bravo) and Taste the Nation with Padma Lakshmi (Hulu); Sandra Lee – Dr. Pimple Popper (TLC); Peyton Manning – History's Greatest of All Time with Peyton Manning (History), Peyton's Places (ESPN+), and Capital One College Bowl (NBC); RuPaul – RuPaul's Drag Race (MTV) and RuPaul's Drag Race All Stars (Paramount+)

=== Special awards ===
==== Impact Award ====
- **Lisa Vanderpump**
