= 4th Critics Choice Real TV Awards =

2022 American television awards

4th Critics' Choice Real TV Awards
- Date: June 12, 2022
- Venue: Fairmont Century Plaza, Los Angeles
- Country: United States
- Presented by: Broadcast Television Journalists Association and NPACT
- Hosted by: Randy Sklar and Jason Sklar
- Website: www.criticschoice.com/critics-choice-real-tv-awards/

The 4th Critics' Choice Real TV Awards, presented by the Broadcast Television Journalists Association and NPACT, which recognizes excellence in nonfiction, unscripted and reality programming across broadcast, cable and streaming platforms, were held on June 12, 2022, at Fairmont Century Plaza in Los Angeles, making it the first in-person ceremony since the 1st in 2019. Nominations were announced on May 16, 2022. Of the nominated programs, Top Chef received the most nominations, with five. Top Chef also won the most awards, with three wins.

== Winners and nominees ==
Winners are listed first and highlighted in bold:

=== Programs ===
Best Competition Series	Best Competition Series: Talent/Variety
**RuPaul's Drag Race (VH1) (tie)**; **Top Chef (Bravo) (tie)**; The Amazing Race (CBS); Chopped (Food Network); The Great British Baking Show (Netflix); Making It (NBC)	**Lizzo's Watch Out for the Big Grrrls (Prime Video)**; Dancing with the Stars (ABC); Finding Magic Mike (HBO Max); Legendary (HBO Max); Next Level Chef (Fox); The Voice (NBC)
Best Unstructured Series	Best Structured Series
**RuPaul's Drag Race: Untucked (VH1)**; Couples Therapy (Showtime); The Kardashians (Hulu); The Real Housewives of Beverly Hills (Bravo); The Real World Homecoming: New Orleans (Paramount+); We're Here (HBO)	**How To with John Wilson (HBO)**; Catfish: The TV Show (MTV); Diners, Drive-Ins and Dives (Food Network); Dr. Pimple Popper (TLC); Gordon Ramsay: Uncharted (National Geographic); Sketchbook (Disney+)
Best Culinary Show	Best Game Show
**Top Chef (Bravo)**; Cooking with Paris (Netflix); Crime Scene Kitchen (Fox); The Great British Baking Show (Netflix); Is It Cake? (Netflix); Magnolia Table with Joanna Gaines (Magnolia)	**Jeopardy! (Syndicated)**; Family Game Fight! (NBC); Holey Moley (ABC); The Price Is Right (CBS); Supermarket Sweep (ABC); Weakest Link (NBC)
Best Travel/Adventure Show	Best Business Show
**Somebody Feed Phil (Netflix)**; The Amazing Race (CBS); Alone (History); Family Dinner (Magnolia); The World According to Jeff Goldblum (Disney+); The World’s Most Amazing Vacation Rentals (Netflix)	**Shark Tank (ABC)**; American Greed (CNBC); Bar Rescue (Paramount+); Million Dollar Wheels (Discovery+); Restaurant: Impossible (Food Network); Undercover Boss (CBS)
Best Animal/Nature Show	Best Crime/Justice Show
**Critter Fixers: Country Vets (National Geographic)**; Crikey! It's the Irwins (Discovery); Eden: Untamed Planet (BBC America); Growing Up Animal (Disney+); Penguin Town (Netflix); The Wizard of Paws (BYU TV)	**Secrets of Playboy (A&E)**; 911 Crisis Center (Oxygen); Cold Justice (Oxygen); Heist (Netflix); Rich & Shameless (TNT); Trafficked with Mariana van Zeller (National Geographic)
Best Sports Show	Best Relationship Show
**Cheer (Netflix)**; 30 for 30 (ESPN); Bad Sport (Netflix); Dallas Cowboys Cheerleaders: Making the Team (CMT); Real Sports with Bryant Gumbel (HBO); Top Class: The Life and Times of the Sierra Canyon Trailblazers (Prime Video)	**Love is Blind (Netflix)**; 90 Day Fiancé (TLC); La Máscara del Amor (Estrella TV); Love on the Spectrum (Netflix); My Mom, Your Dad (HBO Max); The Ultimatum: Marry or Move On (Netflix)
Best Lifestyle: Home/Garden Show	Best Lifestyle: Fashion/Beauty Show
**Million Dollar Listing Los Angeles (Bravo)**; Celebrity IOU (HGTV); Fixer Upper: Welcome Home (Magnolia); Houses with History (HGTV); Married to Real Estate (HGTV); Rock the Block (HGTV)	**Project Runway (Bravo)**; Glow Up: Britain's Next Make-Up Star (Netflix); Love, Kam (SurvivorNetTV); Making the Cut (Prime Video); My Unorthodox Life (Netflix); The Hype (HBO Max)
Best Limited Series	Best Ensemble Cast in an Unscripted Series
**We Need to Talk About Cosby (Showtime)**; Abraham Lincoln (History); Conversations with a Killer: The John Wayne Gacy Tapes (Netflix); Crime Scene: The Times Square Killer (Netflix); Sparking Joy with Marie Kondo (Netflix); Theodore Roosevelt (History)	**RuPaul's Drag Race (VH1)**; Dancing with the Stars (ABC); The Real Housewives of Beverly Hills (Bravo); The Real World Homecoming: New Orleans (Paramount+); Top Chef (NBC); The Voice (Bravo)
Best Show Host	Male Star of the Year
**Padma Lakshmi – Taste the Nation with Padma Lakshmi (Hulu) and Top Chef (Bravo)**; Mayim Bialik – Jeopardy! (Syndicated); Daniel "Desus Nice" Baker and Joel "The Kid Mero" Martinez – Desus & Mero (Showtime); Trevor Noah – The Daily Show with Trevor Noah (Comedy Central); John Oliver – Last Week Tonight with John Oliver (HBO); RuPaul – RuPaul's Drag Race (VH1)	**Robert Irvine – Restaurant: Impossible (Food Network)**; Jeff Goldblum – The World According to Jeff Goldblum (Disney+); Trevor Noah – The Daily Show with Trevor Noah (Comedy Central); Phil Rosenthal – Somebody Feed Phil (Netflix); RuPaul – RuPaul's Drag Race (VH1); Stanley Tucci – Stanley Tucci: Searching for Italy (CNN)
Female Star of the Year	Outstanding Achievement in Nonfiction Programming by a Network or Streaming Platform
**Selena Gomez – Selena + Chef (HBO Max)**; Samantha Bee – Full Frontal with Samantha Bee (TBS); Kelly Clarkson – The Kelly Clarkson Show (Syndicated), The Voice (NBC), and American Song Contest (NBC); Joanna Gaines – Fixer Upper: Welcome Home (Magnolia) and Magnolia Table with Joanna Gaines (Magnolia); Padma Lakshmi – Taste the Nation with Padma Lakshmi (Hulu) and Top Chef (Bravo); Sandra Lee – Dr. Pimple Popper (TLC)	**HBO Max**; Discovery+; Hulu; Netflix; TLC
Outstanding Achievement in Nonfiction Programming
**The Intellectual Property Corporation**; Bunim/Murray Productions; Kinetic Content; Raw TV; Sharp Entertainment; World of Wonder

== Most major nominations ==
Programs that received multiple nominations are listed below, by number of nominations per work and per network:

Shows that received multiple nominations
Nominations	Show	Network
5	Top Chef	Bravo
4	RuPaul's Drag Race	VH1
3	The Voice	NBC
2	The Amazing Race	CBS
2	The Daily Show with Trevor Noah	Comedy Central
2	Dancing with the Stars	ABC
2	Dr. Pimple Popper	TLC
2	Fixer Upper: Welcome Home	Magnolia
2	Jeopardy!	Syndicated
2	Magnolia Table with Joanna Gaines	Magnolia
2	Somebody Feed Phil	Netflix
2	The Real Housewives of Beverly Hills	Bravo
2	The Real World Homecoming: New Orleans	Paramount+
2	Restaurant: Impossible	Food Network
2	Taste the Nation with Padma Lakshmi	Hulu
2	The World According to Jeff Goldblum	Disney+

Nominations by network
Nominations	Network
20	Netflix
11	Bravo
7	NBC
6	HBO Max
5	ABC
5	VH1
4	Hulu
4	HBO
4	HGTV
4	CBS
4	Magnolia
4	TLC
4	Food Network
3	Prime Video
3	Paramount+
3	Showtime
3	Discovery+
3	History
3	Disney+
3	National Geographic
2	Fox
2	Comedy Central
2	Oxygen

=== Most major wins ===
Shows that received multiple awards
Wins	Show	Network
3	Top Chef	Bravo
2	RuPaul's Drag Race	VH1

Wins by network
Wins	Network
5	Bravo
3	Netflix
2	HBO Max
2	VH1
