= 6th Critics Choice Real TV Awards =

2024 American television awards

6th Critics' Choice Real TV Awards
- Date: June 15, 2024
- Location: Fairmont Century Plaza, Los Angeles
- Country: United States
- Presented by: Broadcast Television Journalists Association; NPACT
- Hosted by: Randy Sklar and Jason Sklar
- Website: www.criticschoice.com/critics-choice-real-tv-awards/

The 6th Critics' Choice Real TV Awards, presented by the Broadcast Television Journalists Association and NPACT, which recognizes excellence in nonfiction, unscripted and reality programming across broadcast, cable and streaming platforms, were held on June 15, 2024, at Fairmont Century Plaza in Los Angeles.

The nominations were announced on May 15, 2023, with RuPaul's Drag Race and The Traitors leading with five. The Traitors also won the most awards, with four wins.

== Winners and nominees ==
Winners are listed first, highlighted in boldface, and indicated with a double dagger (‡).

Best Competition Series	Best Competition Series: Talent/Variety
**The Traitors (Peacock)**‡; The Amazing Race (CBS); RuPaul's Drag Race (MTV); Squid Game: The Challenge (Netflix); Survivor (CBS); Top Chef (Bravo)	**The Voice (NBC)**‡; America Idol (ABC); America's Got Talent (NBC); Dancing with the Stars (ABC); The Masked Singer (Fox); So You Think You Can Dance (Fox)
Best Unstructured Series	Best Structured Series
**The Reluctant Traveler (Apple TV+)**‡; Animals Up Close With Bertie Gregory (Nat Geo Wild); Jerrod Carmichael Reality Show (HBO); Love on the Spectrum (Netflix); The Real Housewives of Salt Lake City (Bravo); Why Not Us (ESPN+)	**We're Here (HBO)**‡; Diners, Drive-Ins and Dives (Food Network); The Food That Built America (History); How To with John Wilson (HBO); Queer Eye (Netflix); Shark Tank (ABC)
Best Culinary Show	Best Game Show
**Top Chef (Bravo)**‡; Be My Guest With Ina Garten (Food Network); The Great British Baking Show (Netflix); MasterChef Junior (Fox); Next Level Chef (Fox); Selena + Restaurant (Food Network)	**Celebrity Jeopardy! (ABC)**‡; Celebrity Family Feud (ABC); Celebrity Wheel of Fortune (ABC); Guy’s Grocery Games (Food Network); Password (NBC); Weakest Link (NBC)
Best Travel/Adventure Show	Best Business Show
**The Reluctant Traveler (Apple TV+)**‡; The Great Food Truck Race (Food Network); Lost Cities Revealed With Albert Lin (National Geographic Channel); Never Say Never With Jeff Jenkins (National Geographic Channel); On the Roam (HBO / Max); Somebody Feed Phil (Netflix)	**Shark Tank (ABC)**‡; Bar Rescue (Paramount Network); Kitchen Nightmares (Fox); The Mega-Brands That Built America (History); Start Up (PBS)
Best Animal/Nature Show	Best Crime/Justice Show
**Planet Earth III (Prime Video)**‡; Critter Fixers: Country Vets (National Geographic Channel); Earthsounds (Apple TV+); Life on Our Planet (Netflix); Queens (National Geographic Channel); The Wizard of Paws (BYU TV)	**Trafficked: Underworlds With Mariana van Zeller (National Geographic Channel)**‡; Cold Justice (Oxygen); The Curious Case of Natalia Grace (Investigation Discovery / Max); Death in the Dorms (Hulu); Justice, USA (HBO / Max); Unlocked: A Jail Experiment (Netflix)
Best Sports Show	Best Relationship Show
**Welcome to Wrexham (FX)**‡; 30 for 30 (ESPN); The Dynasty: New England Patriots (Apple TV+); Real Sports with Bryant Gumbel (HBO / Max); Quarterback (Netflix); Untold (Netflix)	**The Golden Bachelor (ABC)**‡; Farmer Wants a Wife (Fox); Jerrod Carmichael Reality Show (HBO); Love Is Blind (Netflix); Love on the Spectrum (Netflix); Swiping America (Max)
Best Lifestyle Show: Home/Garden	Best Lifestyle Show: Fashion/Beauty
**Celebrity IOU (HGTV)**‡; Farmhouse Fixer (HGTV); Home Town (HGTV); Selling Sunset (Netflix); Ugliest House in America (HGTV); Windy City Rehab (HGTV)	**RuPaul's Drag Race (MTV)**‡; Bollywed (Fuse); Glow Up (Netflix); OMG Fashun (E!); Project Runway (Bravo); Queer Eye (Netflix)
Best Limited Series	Best Ensemble Cast in an Unscripted Series
**Beckham (Netflix)**‡; American Nightmare (Netflix); Black Twitter: A People's History (Hulu); JFK: One Day in America (National Geographic Channel); Ladies First: A Story of Women in Hip-Hop (Netflix); Telemarketers (HBO / Max)	**The Traitors (Peacock)**‡; House of Villains (E!); The Real Housewives of Salt Lake City (Bravo); RuPaul's Drag Race (MTV); Vanderpump Rules (Bravo); We're Here (HBO)
Best Show Host	Male Star of the Year
**Alan Cumming – The Traitors (Peacock)**‡; Will Arnett – Lego Masters (Fox); Terry Crews – America’s Got Talent (NBC); Kristen Kish – Top Chef (Bravo); Keke Palmer – Password (NBC); RuPaul – RuPaul's Drag Race (MTV)	**Alan Cumming – The Traitors (Peacock)**‡; Jerrod Carmichael – Jerrod Carmichael Reality Show (HBO); Bertie Gregory – Animals Up Close With Bertie Gregory (Nat Geo Wild); Eugene Levy – The Reluctant Traveler (Apple TV+); RuPaul – RuPaul's Drag Race (MTV); Gerry Turner – The Golden Bachelor (ABC)
Female Star of the Year
**Ariana Madix – Vanderpump Rules (Bravo)**‡; Selena Gomez – Selena + Restaurant (Food Network); Sandra Lee – Dr. Pimple Popper (TLC); Reba McEntire – The Voice (NBC); Phaedra Parks – The Traitors (Peacock); Retta – Ugliest House in America (HGTV)

=== Special awards ===
==== Sam Rubin Award ====
- **Tom Bergeron**

==== Career Achievement Award ====
- **John Walsh**
