= 7th Critics Choice Real TV Awards =

2025 American television awards

7th Critics' Choice Real TV Awards
- Date: May 20, 2025
- Country: United States
- Presented by: Broadcast Television Journalists Association; NPACT
- Website: www.criticschoice.com/critics-choice-real-tv-awards/

The 7th Critics' Choice Real TV Awards, presented by the Broadcast Television Journalists Association and NPACT, recognizes excellence in nonfiction, unscripted and reality programming across broadcast, cable and streaming platforms in 2025. The winners were announced at Critics' Choice Awards website on May 29, 2025.

== Winners and nominees ==
The nominations were announced on May 1, 2025. Peacock reality competition series The Traitors led the nominations with six, followed by Dancing with the Stars and Top Chef with four each.

Winners are listed first, highlighted in boldface, and indicated with a double dagger (‡).

=== Programs ===
**Best Competition Series**: **The Traitors (Peacock)**‡; Finding Mr. Christmas (Hallmark Media); RuPaul's Drag Race (MTV); The Summit (CBS); Survivor (CBS); Top Chef (Bravo)	**Best Competition Series: Talent/Variety**: **Dancing with the Stars (ABC)**‡; America's Got Talent (NBC); American Idol (ABC); RollerJam (Magnolia Network/HBO Max); Second Chance Stage (Magnolia Network/HBO Max); The Voice (NBC)
**Best Unstructured Series**: **Love on the Spectrum (Netflix)**‡; America's Sweethearts: Dallas Cowboys Cheerleaders (Netflix); Below Deck Down Under (Bravo); Naked and Afraid (Discovery Channel); The Real Housewives of Salt Lake City (Bravo); The Secret Lives of Mormon Wives (Hulu)	**Best Structured Series**: **No Taste Like Home with Antoni Porowski (National Geographic)**‡; **Queer Eye (Netflix)**‡; Couples Therapy (Paramount+); Diners, Drive-Ins and Dives (Food Network); Dr. Pimple Popper: Breaking Out (Lifetime); Fixer Upper: The Lakehouse (Magnolia Network)
**Best Culinary Show**: **The Great British Baking Show (Netflix)**‡; Be My Guest with Ina Garten (Food Network); The Food That Built America (History Channel); Harry Potter: Wizards of Baking (Food Network); Is It Cake? Holiday (Netflix); Top Chef (Bravo)	**Best Game Show**: **Jeopardy! (Syndicated)**‡; Celebrity Family Feud (ABC); The Floor (Fox); Guy's Grocery Games (Food Network); Press Your Luck (ABC); Weakest Link (NBC)
**Best Travel/Adventure Show**: **Conan O'Brien Must Go (HBO/HBO Max)**‡; Expedition Unknown (Discovery Channel); Getting Lost with Erin French (Magnolia Network); The Great Food Truck Race (Food Network); Long Way Home (Apple TV+); No Taste Like Home with Antoni Porowski (National Geographic)	**Best Business Show**: **Shark Tank (ABC)**‡; Bar Rescue (Paramount Network); First-Time Buyer's Club (OWN); King of Collectibles: The Goldin Touch (Netflix); Kitchen Nightmares (Fox); Start Up (PBS)
**Best Animal/Nature Show**: **The Americas (NBC)**‡; Mammals (BBC America); Nature (PBS); OceanXplorers (National Geographic); Planet Earth: Asia (BBC America); The Secret Lives of Animals (Apple TV+)	**Best Crime/Justice Show**: **The Curious Case of Natalia Grace: The Final Chapter (Investigation Discovery)**‡; The First 48 (A&E); How I Escaped My Cult (Freeform); Ozark Law (A&E); Philly Homicide (Oxygen True Crime); Scam Goddess (Freeform)
**Best Sports Show**: **Welcome to Wrexham (FX on Hulu)**‡; 30 for 30 (ESPN); Hard Knocks (HBO/HBO Max); In the Arena: Serena Williams (ESPN+); Pardon the Interruption (ESPN); Untold (Netflix)	**Best Relationship Show**: **Love on the Spectrum (Netflix)**‡; Farmer Wants a Wife (Fox); The Golden Bachelorette (ABC); The Later Daters (Netflix); Love Is Blind (Netflix); Small Town Setup (Hallmark Media)
**Best Lifestyle Show: Home/Garden**: **Don't Hate Your House with the Property Brothers (HGTV)**‡; **Rock the Block (HGTV)**‡; Bargain Block (HGTV); The Great Christmas Light Fight (ABC); Maine Cabin Masters: Building Italy (Magnolia Network); Renovation Aloha (HGTV)	**Best Lifestyle Show: Fashion/Beauty**: **RuPaul's Drag Race (MTV)**‡; Dress My Tour (Hulu); Queer Eye (Netflix); RuPaul's Drag Race All Stars (Paramount+); Say Yes to the Dress (TLC); Wear Whatever the F You Want (Prime Video)
**Best Limited Series**: **Tucci in Italy (National Geographic)**‡; Cult Massacre: One Day in Jonestown (National Geographic); Erased: WW2's Heroes of Color (National Geographic); Gone Girls: The Long Island Serial Killer (Netflix); Simone Biles Rising (Netflix); The Wonderland Massacre & The Secret History of Hollywood (MGM+)

=== Personalities ===
**Best Ensemble Cast in an Unscripted Series**: **The Traitors (Peacock)**‡; Bobby's Triple Threat (Food Network); Claim to Fame (ABC); Dancing with the Stars (ABC); The Real Housewives of Salt Lake City (Bravo); Top Chef (Bravo)	**Best Show Host**: **Alan Cumming – The Traitors (Peacock)**‡; Jonathan Bennett – Finding Mr. Christmas (Hallmark Media); Terry Crews – America's Got Talent (NBC); Colin Jost – Pop Culture Jeopardy! (Prime Video); Kristen Kish – Top Chef (Bravo); Jeff Probst – Survivor (CBS)
**Male Star of the Year**: **Stephen Nedoroscik – Dancing with the Stars (ABC)**‡; Jonathan Bennett – Finding Mr. Christmas (Hallmark Media); Alan Cumming – The Traitors (Peacock); Dylan Efron – The Traitors (Peacock); Antoni Porowski – No Taste Like Home with Antoni Porowski (National Geographic) and Queer Eye (Netflix); Stanley Tucci – Tucci in Italy (National Geographic)	**Female Star of the Year**: **Dr. Sandra Lee – Dr. Pimple Popper: Breaking Out (Lifetime)**‡; Joanna Gaines – Fixer Upper: The Lakehouse, Magnolia Table with Joanna Gaines, and Mini Reni (Magnolia Network); Ina Garten – Be My Guest with Ina Garten (Food Network); Julianne Hough – Dancing with the Stars (ABC); Lisa Vanderpump – Vanderpump Villa (Hulu); Gabby Windey – The Traitors (Peacock)

== Programs with multiple nominations and awards ==
Programs that received multiple nominations
Nominations	Program	Network
6	The Traitors	Peacock
4	Dancing with the Stars	ABC
4	Top Chef	Bravo
3	Finding Mr. Christmas	Hallmark Media
3	No Taste Like Home with Antoni Porowski	National Geographic
3	Queer Eye	Netflix
2	America's Got Talent	NBC
2	Be My Guest with Ina Garten	Food Network
2	Dr. Pimple Popper: Breaking Out	Lifetime
2	Fixer Upper: The Lakehouse	Magnolia Network
2	Love on the Spectrum	Netflix
2	The Real Housewives of Salt Lake City	Bravo
2	RuPaul's Drag Race	MTV
2	Survivor	CBS
2	Tucci in Italy	National Geographic

Programs that received multiple wins
Awards	Program	Network
3	The Traitors	Peacock
2	Dancing with the Stars	ABC
2	Love on the Spectrum	Netflix
