= The Reluctant Traveler =

Travel documentary comedy television series

- Promotional poster
- Genre: Travel documentary; Comedy
- Presented by: Eugene Levy
- Composer: David Schweitzer
- Country of origin: United Kingdom
- Original language: English
- No. of seasons: 3
- No. of episodes: 23

Production
- Executive producers: Eugene Levy; David Brindley; Sara Evans; Nic Patten; Sara Brailsford; Lily Fitzpatrick; Iain Peckham
- Running time: 33–38 minutes
- Production company: Twofour

Original release
- Network: Apple TV+
- Release: February 24, 2023 – October 10, 2025
- Network: Apple TV
- Release: October 17, 2025 – present

The Reluctant Traveler is a British travel documentary comedy television series on Apple TV+. The series follows Canadian actor Eugene Levy, who travels to hotels around the world and explores the places and cultures surrounding them. The first season premiered on February 23, 2023, the second on March 8, 2024, and the third on September 19, 2025. In June 2026, the series was renewed for a fourth season.

== Premise ==
The first season sees Eugene visit locations in Costa Rica, Finland, Italy, Japan, Maldives, Portugal, South Africa and the United States. The second season takes him on a European trip from top to bottom. This includes Scotland, where his mother was born, but he never had a chance to visit until filming the series. The third season challenges him to visit once in a lifetime trips on his bucket list.

== Episodes ==
Season	Episodes	Originally released	
Season	Episodes	First released	Last released
1	8	February 24, 2023	
2	7	March 8, 2024	April 12, 2024
3	8	September 19, 2025	October 31, 2025

=== Season 1 (2023) ===
No. overall	No. in season	Title	Original release date
1	1	"Finland"	February 24, 2023
2	2	"Costa Rica"	February 24, 2023
3	3	"Venice"	February 24, 2023
4	4	"Utah"	February 24, 2023
5	5	"Maldives"	February 24, 2023
6	6	"South Africa"	February 24, 2023
7	7	"Lisbon"	February 24, 2023
8	8	"Tokyo"	February 24, 2023

=== Season 2: Europe (2024) ===
No. overall	No. in season	Title	Original release date
9	1	"Sweden: Midsummer"	March 8, 2024
10	2	"Scotland: My Mother's Country"	March 8, 2024
11	3	"France: The Secrets of Saint-Tropez"	March 15, 2024
12	4	"Germany: The Health Resort"	March 22, 2024
13	5	"Italy: La Dolce Vita"	March 29, 2024
14	6	"Greece: Island-Hopping in the Aegean"	April 5, 2024
15	7	"Spain: Adventures in Andalusia"	April 12, 2024

=== Season 3: Bucket List (2025) ===
No. overall	No. in season	Title	Original release date
16	1	"Celebrating Day of the Dead in Mexico"	September 19, 2025
17	2	"Waltzing in the City of Music: Vienna"	September 19, 2025
18	3	"Hitting the Open Road in Louisiana"	September 26, 2025
19	4	"Living the Royal Life in the UK"	October 3, 2025
20	5	"Trendsetting in South Korea"	October 10, 2025
21	6	"Partying on St. Paddy's Day in Ireland"	October 17, 2025
22	7	"Journeying Through a Jewel of India"	October 24, 2025
23	8	"Going Wild for a Weekend in Vancouver"	October 31, 2025

== Release ==
On December 13, 2022, Apple TV+ announced that the series would premiere on February 24, 2023. On April 24, 2023, the series was renewed for a second season, which released on March 8, 2024. On June 24, 2024, the series was renewed for a third season, which released on September 17, 2025. On June 16, 2026, the series was renewed for a fourth season.

== Reception ==
=== Critical response ===
On the review aggregator website Rotten Tomatoes, 87% of 15 critics' reviews are positive for the first series.

=== Accolades ===
Year	Award	Category	Nominee(s)	Result	Ref.
2023	Critics' Choice Real TV Awards	Best Travel/Adventure Show	The Reluctant Traveler	Won	
2023	Critics' Choice Real TV Awards	Star of the Year	Eugene Levy	Won	
2023	Hollywood Music in Media Awards	Original Score – Documentary Series – TV/Digital	David Schweitzer	Nominated	
2023	Imagen Awards	Best Variety or Reality Show	The Reluctant Traveler	Won	
2024	Astra Creative Arts TV Awards	Best Streaming Nonfiction Series	The Reluctant Traveler	Won	
2024	Critics' Choice Real TV Awards	Best Unstructured Series	The Reluctant Traveler	Won	
2024	Critics' Choice Real TV Awards	Best Travel/Adventure Show	The Reluctant Traveler	Won	
2024	Critics' Choice Real TV Awards	Male Star of the Year	Eugene Levy	Nominated	
2024	Primetime Creative Arts Emmy Awards	Outstanding Hosted Nonfiction Series or Special	The Reluctant Traveler	Nominated	
2024	Primetime Creative Arts Emmy Awards	Outstanding Writing for a Nonfiction Program	Alan Connor, David Reilly, and Christine Rose (for "Scotland: My Mother's Country")	Nominated	
2024	Astra TV Awards	Best Nonfiction Series	The Reluctant Traveler	Nominated	
2025	Critics' Choice Documentary Awards	Best Ongoing Documentary Series	The Reluctant Traveler	Nominated	
2026	Primetime Creative Arts Emmy Awards	Outstanding Hosted Nonfiction Series or Special	Kate McLernon-Billows, Eugene Levy, David Brindley, Nic Patten, Lily Fitzpatrick, Iain Peckham, Sara Brailsford and Amy Browning	Nominated	
2026	Primetime Creative Arts Emmy Awards	Outstanding Writing for a Nonfiction Program	David Reilly and Christine Rose (for "Living the Royal Life in the UK")	Nominated	
