= Taste the Nation with Padma Lakshmi =

2020 American docuseries

Taste the Nation with Padma Lakshmi is an American travel and food documentary television series. It stars Padma Lakshmi and follows her on her travels around the United States to learn about a specific food and culture in each city. The series premiered on Hulu, on June 19, 2020. In August 2020, it was renewed for a second season. The series generally received positive reviews from critics.

== Episodes ==
=== Series overview ===
Season	Episodes	Originally released
1	10	June 18, 2020
Holiday Edition	4	November 4, 2021
2	10	May 5, 2023

=== Season 1 (2020) ===
No. overall	No. in season	Title	Location	Food/Culture	Original release date
1	1	"Burritos at the Border"	El Paso	Mexican	June 18, 2020
2	2	"The All American Weiner"	Milwaukee	German	June 18, 2020
3	3	"Don't Mind if I Dosa"	New York City	Indian	June 18, 2020
4	4	"The Gullah Way"	South Carolina	Gullah Geechee	June 18, 2020
5	5	"What is Chop Suey Anyway?"	San Francisco	Chinese	June 18, 2020
6	6	"Where the Kebob Is Hot"	Los Angeles	Persian	June 18, 2020
7	7	"The Original Americans"	Arizona	Native American	June 18, 2020
8	8	"Dancing In Little Lima"	Paterson, New Jersey	Peruvian	June 18, 2020
9	9	"The Pad Thai Gamble"	Las Vegas	Thai	June 18, 2020
10	10	"Zen and the Art of Poke"	Honolulu	Japanese	June 18, 2020

=== Taste the Nation: Holiday Edition (2021) ===
No. overall	No. in season	Title	Location	Food/Culture	Original release date
11	1	"Happy Challah Days"	Lower East Side	Jewish	November 4, 2021
12	2	"Truth and the Turkey Tale"	Cape Cod and Martha's Vineyard	Wampanoag	November 4, 2021
13	3	"Mojo-ho Christmas"	Miami	Cuban	November 4, 2021
14	4	"K-Town Countdown"	Los Angeles	Korean	November 4, 2021

=== Season 2 (2023) ===
No. overall	No. in season	Title	Location	Food/Culture	Original release date
15	1	"Ketchup or No Ketchup"	Puerto Rico	Puerto Rican	May 5, 2023
16	2	"From Kabul with Love"	Washington, D.C.	Afghan	May 5, 2023
17	3	"Padma and the Beanstalk"	South Appalachia	Appalachian	May 5, 2023
18	4	"The Borscht Identity"	New York	Ukrainian	May 5, 2023
19	5	"Fufu for the Win"	Houston	Nigerian	May 5, 2023
20	6	"Ube in the Bay"	San Francisco	Filipino	May 5, 2023
21	7	"Greeks on the Gulf"	Tarpon Springs, Florida	Greek	May 5, 2023
22	8	"On the Tip of my Kreung"	Lowell, Massachusetts	Cambodian	May 5, 2023
23	9	"Halal from Dearborn"	Dearborn, Michigan	Arab	May 5, 2023
24	10	"Ciao New York"	New York	Italian	May 5, 2023

== Release ==
Taste the Nation with Padma Lakshmi premiered on Hulu on June 19, 2020. In August 2020, Hulu renewed the show for a second season composed of 10 episodes, which was later truncated to 4 episodes due to the COVID-19 pandemic, and released as a holiday edition. In March 2023, it was reported that Taste the Nation with Padma Lakshmi would return on Hulu on May 5, 2023, with a 10-episode second season.

== Reception ==
=== Critical response ===
The review aggregator website Rotten Tomatoes reported a 100% approval rating with an average rating of 8.40/10, based on 19 critic reviews. The website's critics consensus reads, "A delicious and insightful reminder of the ways food brings us together, Taste the Nation explores the impact of indigenous and immigrant cuisine on American food as we know it." Metacritic, which uses a weighted average, assigned a score of 79 out of 100 based on 6 critics, indicating "generally favorable reviews".

=== Accolades ===
Year	Award	Category	Nominee(s)	Result	Ref.
2020	Gotham Awards	Breakthrough Series – Short Form	Taste the Nation with Padma Lakshmi	Nominated	
2021	Critics' Choice Real TV Awards	Best Show Host	Padma Lakshmi	Nominated	
2021	Critics' Choice Real TV Awards	Female Star of the Year	Padma Lakshmi	Nominated	
2021	Television Critics Association Awards	Outstanding Achievement in Reality Programming	Taste the Nation with Padma Lakshmi	Nominated	
2022	Critics' Choice Real TV Awards	Best Show Host	Padma Lakshmi	Won	
2023	Critics' Choice Real TV Awards	Best Structured Series	Taste the Nation with Padma Lakshmi	Won	
2023	Critics' Choice Real TV Awards	Best Show Host	Padma Lakshmi	Won	
