= The Hype (2021 TV series) =

American reality television series

- Genre: Reality competition
- Created by: Rachelle Mendez; David Collins; Rob Eric
- Directed by: Rachelle Mendez; David Collins; Rob Eric; Michael Williams
- Presented by: Speedy Morman
- Judges: Marni Senofonte; Beth "Bephie" Birkett; Offset
- Country of origin: United States
- Original language: English
- No. of seasons: 2
- No. of episodes: 16

Production
- Executive producers: Jay Brown; Rikki Hughes; Rachelle Mendez; Michael Williams; Jay Brown; Tyran Smith
- Running time: 42–49 minutes
- Production company: Scout Productions

Original release
- Network: HBO Max
- Release: August 12, 2021 – October 6, 2022

The Hype is an American reality television series presented by Speedy Morman which showcases the best streetwear fashion designers in the country. The designers compete for the judges' "co-sign" and a cash prize of $150,000. The series premiered on August 12, 2021, on HBO Max. The series was picked up for a second season, which premiered on September 22, 2022, with Morman returning as host, as well as all three judges from the first season.

== Cast ==
=== Hosts ===
- Speedy Morman

=== Judges ===
- Marni Senofonte
- Beth "Bephie" Berkitt
- Offset

==== Guest Judges (Season 1) ====
- A$AP Ferg
- Alexander John
- Jim Lee
- Bobby Hundreds
- Cardi B
- Dapper Dan

==== Guest Judges (Season 2) ====
- Law Roach
- 24kGoldn
- Kai Nguyen
- Angelo Baque
- Blacc Sam
- BH
- Shai Gilgeous-Alexander

=== Designers (Season 1) ===
The first season began with 9 designers. Wole joined the competition in the second episode.

Name	Brand	Hometown	Placement
Justin Mensinger	Justin Mensinger	Chicago, Illinois	Winner
Kai Nguyen	Lumières	Los Angeles, California (born in Vietnam)	Runner-up
Paije Speights	Front Paije	Detroit, Michigan	3rd
Camila Romero	DeadBlud Label	Los Angeles, California (born in Colombia)	5th
Blu	WNTD Apparel	Los Angeles, California	4th
Wole	A.M.A. (Against Medical Advice)	Brooklyn, New York	6th
Alan Cheung (a.k.a. Alan King)	AKINGS	New York City, New York	7th
Caroline Bentley Noble	Avenue C	Lexington, Kentucky	8th
Timeekah Murphy (a.k.a. Murph)	Alani Taylor	The Bronx, New York	9th
Jolleson	Jolleson	Los Angeles, California	10th

=== Designers (Season 2) ===
The second season began with 12 designers, but only 9 were guaranteed spots in the competition. The judges looked at the designers' racks and ranked Alexzander, Chelsea, and Jason at the bottom. The three designers then competed to put together a look to earn the final spot in the show, which Alexzander won.

Name	Brand	Hometown	Placement
Winston Bartholomew Holder III (a.k.a. Barth)	BGold NYC	New York, New York	Winner
Khanh Ngo	MADE & Co. Gallery	Columbus, Ohio	Runner-up
Knoxx	Dvmn Pigeon	Elmira, New York	Runner-up
Bryan Gonzalez	Second and 7th	South Los Angeles, California	4th
Alexzander	Lab 74	Detroit, Michigan	5th
Cierra Boyd	Friskmegood	Cleveland, Ohio	6th
Domo Wilkins	Faded NYC	North Carolina	7th
Vell Beck	VBNYC	Harlem, New York	8th (disqualified)
T. Dionne	Futura by T. Dionne	Texas	9th
Rupal Banerjee	Ru by Rupal	New York, New York	10th
Chelsea Ma	Takeon Label	New York, New York	11th/12th (joint elimination)
Jason Scott	Verdict Still Out	Atlanta, Georgia	11th/12th (joint elimination)

== Episodes ==
=== Season 1 (2021) ===
No. overall	No. in season	Title	Original release date
1	1	"The Streets Are Your Runway"	August 12, 2021
After exploring their new work studio, the designers face a blind critique of their sample racks in an unexpected first impressions challenge and they create a classic streetwear look for A$AP Ferg with the promise of a sky-high prize.
2	2	"West Coast Classic With a Twist"	August 12, 2021
The designers meet another curveball when a new talent joins the competition; the contestants draw inspiration from their roots to design jackets representative of their communities.
3	3	"Young Hearts Run Free"	August 12, 2021
Love is in the air as the designers create cohesive, sustainably crafted looks for the ultimate It-couple, but a surprise test in collaboration threatens to break hearts.
4	4	"DC Hype Squad"	August 19, 2021
With guidance from sneaker customizer Alexander John and DC Comics' Jim Lee, the remaining designers take inspiration from The Suicide Squad's iconic characters to craft head-to-toe streetwear looks fit for a superhero.
5	5	"Get Up, Stand Up"	August 19, 2021
With streetwear trailblazers Bobby Hundreds and Angelo Baque on hand to help them through, the designers tackle a personal and emotional challenge: instilling their core beliefs into looks that address pressing social issues.
6	6	"Offset Your Style"	August 19, 2021
After receiving guidance and feedback from Cardi B, the contestants struggle to impress Offset with their hoodie designs - at the risk of losing out on a career-changing collab.
7	7	"Ladies in the Place"	August 25, 2021
Victory is within reach as the semi-finalists create looks inspired by the strong women in their lives; even with guidance from Bephie and Marni, some designers struggle to create their first-ever women's outfits.
8	8	"The Co-Sign"	August 25, 2021
The designers lean on Bobby Hundreds to help crystallize their creative lookbooks; Dapper Dan and other pioneering streetwear superstars spark much-needed inspiration as the finalists present their full collections in an unforgettable runway show.

=== Season 2 (2022) ===
No. overall	No. in season	Title	Original release date
9	1	"Understand the Assignment"	September 22, 2022
The designers are given 24 hours to convey their own unique perspective on luxury streetwear to impress style icon Law Roach and guest Co-Signers 24kGoldn and season one finalist Kai Nguyen.
10	2	"Prep in Your Step"	September 22, 2022
Tasked with revamping the preppy fashion trend, the designers must hone their distinct creative vision to create a fresh take on the iconic look; fashion innovator Angelo Baque drops by to offer a chance at a once-in-a-lifetime collaboration.
11	3	"Board Meeting"	September 22, 2022
The contestants hit the skate park to grind out outfits for pro-skaters that blend natural street style with mobility and comfort.
12	4	"Marathon X The Hype"	September 29, 2022
With guidance from Marathon Clothing's Blacc Sam and BH, the contestants channel inspiration from the company's founder, Nipsey Hussle, to pay homage to their communities by designing iconic streetwear staples.
13	5	"Offset Your Fam"	September 29, 2022
In a test of collaboration, the designers are placed in pairs to create fresh outfits for what may be their most discerning clients yet: Offset's children.
14	6	"The Game Before the Game"	September 29, 2022
The worlds of streetwear and sports collide when the designers are challenged to create a fly pre-game fit for NBA's Shai Gilgeous-Alexander.
15	7	"From the Block to the Blockchain"	October 6, 2022
Immersing themselves in the metaverse, the semi-finalists must create two distinct t-shirts: one for the real world and the other as a unique NFT design; after receiving advice, the designers draw inspiration from their own lives.
16	8	"The Final Drop X Street Party"	October 6, 2022
The remaining contestants must impress the Co-Signers with a cohesive and impactful lookbook; Law Roach returns to dole out his styling wisdom before the finalists debut their full collections.
