= Critics' Choice Television Award for Best Reality Series – Competition =

Annual award by the Broadcast Television Critics Association

The Critics' Choice Television Award for Best Reality Series – Competition is one of the award categories presented annually by the Critics' Choice Television Awards (BTJA). It was introduced in 2011 when the event was first initiated. The winners are selected by a group of television critics that are part of the Broadcast Television Critics Association.

== Winners and nominees ==
=== 2010s ===
Year	Show
2010-2011	American Idol
2010-2011	The Amazing Race
2010-2011	Dancing with the Stars
2010-2011	Project Runway
2010-2011	RuPaul's Drag Race
2010-2011	Top Chef
2011-2012	The Voice
2011-2012	The Amazing Race
2011-2012	Chopped
2011-2012	The Pitch
2011-2012	Shark Tank
2011-2012	So You Think You Can Dance
2012-2013	The Voice
2012-2013	Chopped
2012-2013	Face Off
2012-2013	Shark Tank
2012-2013	So You Think You Can Dance
2012-2013	Survivor
2013-2014	Shark Tank
2013-2014	The Amazing Race
2013-2014	Project Runway
2013-2014	Survivor
2013-2014	Top Chef
2013-2014	The Voice
2014-2015	Face Off
2014-2015	The Amazing Race
2014-2015	America's Got Talent
2014-2015	Dancing with the Stars
2014-2015	MasterChef Junior
2014-2015	The Voice
2015 (2)	The Voice
2015 (2)	The Amazing Race
2015 (2)	Chopped
2015 (2)	Face Off
2015 (2)	MasterChef Junior
2015 (2)	Survivor
2016	The Voice
2016	The Amazing Race
2016	America's Got Talent
2016	MasterChef Junior
2016	RuPaul's Drag Race
2016	Skin Wars
2017	The Voice
2017	America's Got Talent
2017	Chopped
2017	Dancing with the Stars
2017	Project Runway
2017	RuPaul's Drag Race
2018	The Voice
2018	America's Got Talent
2018	Chopped
2018	Dancing with the Stars
2018	Project Runway
2018	RuPaul's Drag Race

== Multiple wins ==
5 wins

- The Voice (3 consecutive, 2 consecutive)

== Multiple nominations ==
7 nominations
- The Voice
6 nominations
- The Amazing Race
4 nominations

- Chopped

3 nominations

- America's Got Talent
- Dancing with the Stars
- Face Off
- MasterChef Junior
- Project Runway
- RuPaul's Drag Race
- Shark Tank
- Survivor

2 nominations

- So You Think You Can Dance
- Top Chef

== See also ==
- Primetime Emmy Award for Outstanding Reality-Competition Program
- TCA Award for Outstanding Achievement in Reality Programming
