= Finding Mr. Christmas =

- Genre: Reality competition
- Presented by: Jonathan Bennett
- Judges: Jonathan Bennett; Melissa Peterman
- Country of origin: United States
- Original language: English
- No. of seasons: 2
- No. of episodes: 17

Production
- Executive producers: Adam Cohen; Ben Roy; Cara Tapper; Joanna Vernetti; Jonathan Bennett
- Producers: Kelley Coorloff; Taylor Cochoran; David Lutz
- Running time: 41–55 minutes
- Production companies: Super Delicious Productions; Hallmark Media

Original release
- Network: Hallmark+
- Release: October 31, 2024 – December 20, 2025

Finding Mr. Christmas is an American reality competition television series that premiered on October 31, 2024, on Hallmark+. The series follows a group of men competing in various Christmas-themed challenges to win the title of Mr. Christmas, as well as a role in a Hallmark Christmas movie.

The series was renewed for a second season, which premiered on October 27, 2025.

== Format ==
The contestants in the series are men from various backgrounds who aspire to become actors. In each episode, they face two rounds of challenges. The first round is titled "Festive Face Off," where contestants showcase their holiday spirit. The winner of the face-off earns an advantage in the Star Quality challenge. The second main challenge, titled "Star Quality," is an acting challenge where contestants have to learn a script and act out a scene from a Hallmark Christmas movie.

After the challenge, the judges deliberate to pick the strongest and the weakest competitors. The contestant who did not impress the judges is eliminated from the competition.

=== Judges ===
Bennett both hosts and judges the competition, with Melissa Peterman joining him as the main judge. The series features various guest judges each episode.

== Series overview ==
Season	Episodes	Originally released		Winner
Season	Episodes	First released	Last released	Winner
1	8	October 31, 2024	December 12, 2024	Ezra Moreland
2	9	October 27, 2025	December 15, 2025	Craig Geoghan

=== Season 1 (2024) ===
The season premiered on October 31, 2024. It was won by Ezra Moreland. The prize for winning the first season was a leading role in the Hallmark movie Happy Howlidays.

=== Season 2 (2025) ===
The ten contestants of the second season were revealed in October 2025. The season premiered on October 27, 2025.

Ages, names, and cities stated are at time of filming.

Contestants of Finding Mr. Christmas season 2
Contestant	Age	Hometown	Occupation	Outcome
Craig Geoghan	33	Lake Ronkonkoma, New York	Personal trainer, actor	Winner
Angel Garet	38	Charlotte, North Carolina	Model, actor, and bartender	Finalist
Rustin Sailors	37	San Diego, California	Musician	Finalist
Marcus Brodie	32	Hamilton, Ohio	Model, actor	Eliminated 4th
Davey Fisher	34	Lake Tahoe, Nevada	Commercial model, actor	Eliminated 5th
Robbie Simpson	35	New York City	Acting teacher	Eliminated 6th
Gabriel Thaxton	32	Laramie, Wyoming	Model	Eliminated 7th
Logan Shephard	30	Cincinnati, Ohio	Server, photographer	Eliminated 8th
Drake Kuyper	27	Denver, Colorado	Model, social media manager	Eliminated 9th
Jake Schum	36	Lake View, New York	Former NFL player	Eliminated 10th

=== Contestant progress ===
Legend:

WINNER indicates that the contestant was named Mr. Christmas.
WIN indicates that the contestant won the Star Quality Challenge.
SAFE indicates that the contestant neither won nor was eliminated.
BTM (Bottom) indicates that the contestant was up for elimination.
ELIM (Eliminated) indicates that the contestant was eliminated.

Progress of contestants including placements in each episode
Contestant	Episode							
Contestant	1	2	3	4	5	6	7	8
Craig Geoghan	SAFE	BTM	SAFE	BTM	WIN	WIN	SAFE	WIN
Angel Garet	SAFE	BTM	SAFE	SAFE	SAFE	SAFE	WIN	ELIM
Rustin Sailors	WIN	SAFE	SAFE	SAFE	BTM	SAFE	BTM	ELIM
Marcus Brodie	SAFE	SAFE	WIN	SAFE	BTM	BTM	ELIM	
Davey Fisher	SAFE	WIN	SAFE	SAFE	SAFE	ELIM		
Robbie Simpson	SAFE	SAFE	SAFE	WIN	ELIM			
Gabriel Thaxton	BTM	SAFE	BTM	ELIM				
Logan Shephard	SAFE	SAFE	ELIM					
Drake Kuyper	BTM	ELIM						
Jake Schum	ELIM							

== Episodes ==
=== Season 2 (2025) ===
No. overall	No. in season	Title	Original release date	Viewers (millions)
9	1	"The Search For Mr. Christmas"	October 27, 2025	0.402
10	2	"Reindeer Games"	November 3, 2025	0.384
11	3	"Riding into Romance"	November 10, 2025	0.486
12	4	"A Very Merry Talent Show"	November 17, 2025	0.472
13	5	"Christmas on Main Street"	November 24, 2025	0.484
14	6	"The Holi-Date"	December 1, 2025	0.574
15	7	"Merry Christmas, Mom"	December 8, 2025	N/A
16	8	"Crowning Mr. Christmas"	December 15, 2025	N/A
17	9	"Finding Mr. Christmas: Reunion Special"	December 20, 2025	N/A

== Reception ==
The series was nominated for the Outstanding Reality Program at the 36th GLAAD Media Awards.
