= Critics Choice Real TV Awards =

- Current: 8th Critics Choice Real TV Awards
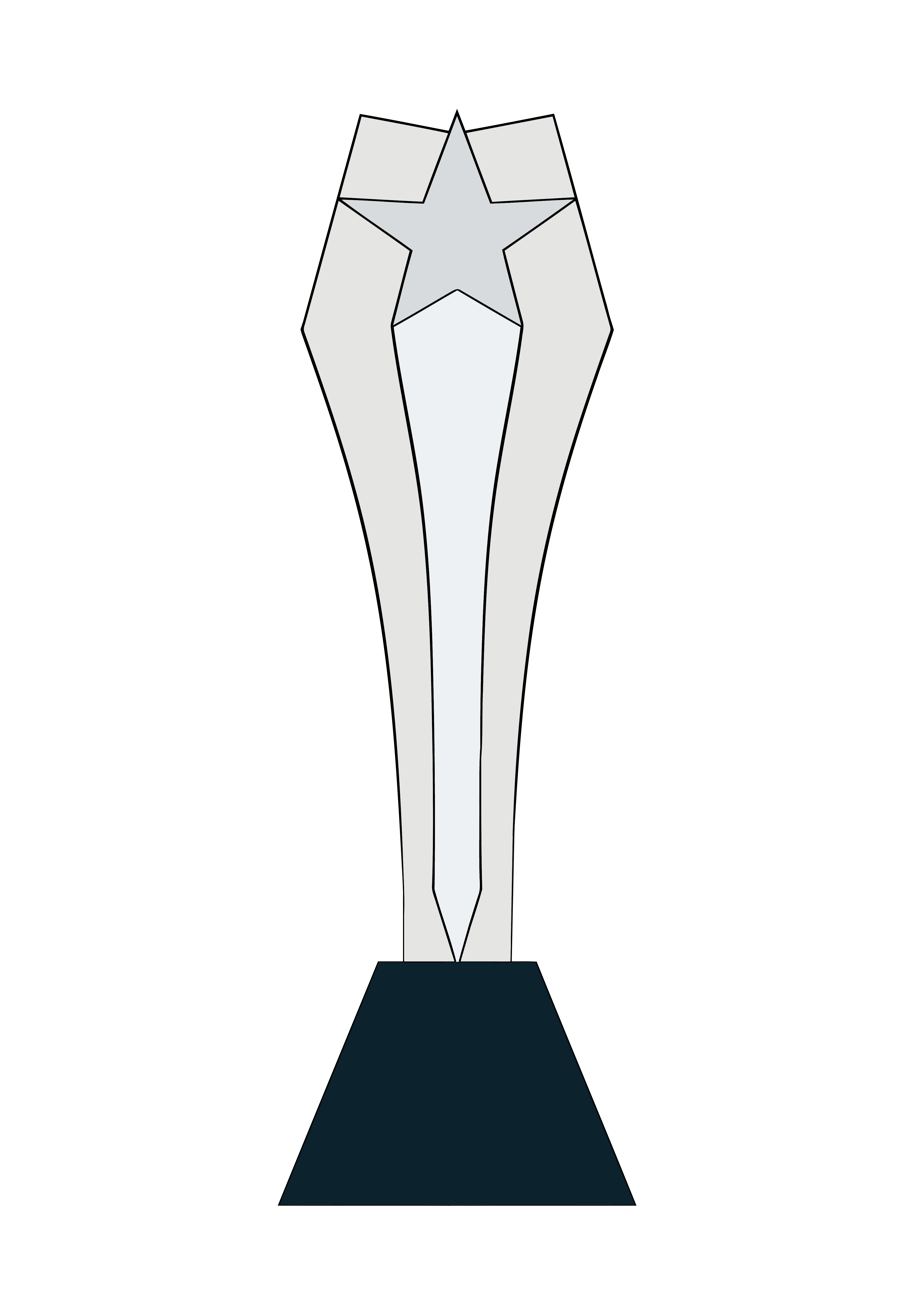
- Awarded for: Best in nonfiction, unscripted and reality television
- Country: United States
- Presented by: CCA & NPACT
- First award: 2019
- Website: criticschoice.com

The Critics Choice Real TV Awards are accolades for nonfiction, unscripted and reality television content presented by the Critics Choice Association and NPACT. They were established in 2018, and the first ceremony was held on June 2, 2019, and aired on VH1 on June 9.

== Categories ==
- Best Competition Series
- Best Competition Series: Talent/Variety
- Best Structured Series
- Best Unstructured Series
- Best Ongoing Documentary Series
- Best Limited Documentary Series
- Best Short Form Series
- Best Interactive Show
- Best Live Show
- Best Talk Show
- Best Late Night Talk Show
- Best Entertainment News Show
- Best Culinary Show
- Best Game Show
- Best Travel/Adventure Show
- Best Business Show
- Best Animal/Nature Show
- Best Crime/Justice Show
- Best Sports Show
- Best Relationship Show
- Best Lifestyle Show: Home/Garden
- Best Lifestyle Show: Fashion/Beauty
- Best Ensemble Cast in an Unscripted Series
- Best Show Host
- Male Star of the Year
- Female Star of the Year

== Award ceremonies ==
- 2019
- 2020
- 2021
- 2022
- 2023
- 2024
- 2025
- 2026
