= Somebody Feed Phil =

Netflix travel documentary series

- Genre: Documentary; Travel documentary
- Directed by: John Bedolis
- Presented by: Philip Rosenthal
- Theme music composer: Lake Street Dive
- Country of origin: United States
- Original language: English
- No. of seasons: 8
- No. of episodes: 49

Production
- Executive producer: Rich Rosenthal
- Running time: 46–63 minutes
- Production company: Netflix Studios

Original release
- Network: Netflix
- Release: January 12, 2018 – June 18, 2025

Somebody Feed Phil is an American travel documentary television series presented by Philip Rosenthal that premiered on Netflix in January 2018. Each episode follows Rosenthal touring the cuisine of its featured city, and spotlights charities and non-profit organizations that operate in the region.

In May 2019, Netflix announced that it had renewed Somebody Feed Phil for a third season, which was released in May 2020. A fourth season, shot back-to-back with the third, was released in October 2020. The fifth season was released in May 2022. The show was also renewed for a sixth season, which was filmed back-to-back with season 5. In January 2023, the show was renewed for a seventh season, which was released in March 2024. In July 2024, it was renewed for season 8 which was released on June 18, 2025. In March 2026, it was announced that the series would continue on YouTube starting in 2027 as part of a deal between Rosenthal and Banijay Entertainment.

== Overview ==
The show is a spiritual successor to Rosenthal's previous show on PBS, I'll Have What Phil's Having. When Rosenthal moved the program from PBS to Netflix, a theme song recorded by the band Lake Street Dive was added to the opening. Phil's brother Rich Rosenthal serves as executive producer and showrunner of the series, and sometimes appears on camera to sample food at Phil's urging.

Near the end of each episode during the first two seasons, Rosenthal makes a video call to his parents, Max and Helen, relating to them his culinary discoveries, after which Max tells his son a joke. After Helen's death in 2019, Max continued to appear in the segment for the next two seasons until his death in 2021. From the fifth season, Rosenthal would call a different guest each episode, which have included his son Ben, Everybody Loves Raymond stars Brad Garrett and Ray Romano, Ted Danson, Fran Drescher, Judy Gold, Gilbert Gottfried, Patton Oswalt, Paul Reiser, and Mel Brooks, to continue the tradition. A tribute episode dedicated to Max and Helen aired as part of the sixth season.

A companion cookbook to the series, Somebody Feed Phil: The Book, was released in October 2022.

== Episodes ==
| Season | Episodes | Originally released |
|---|---|---|
| 1 | 6 | January 12, 2018 |
| 2 | 6 | July 6, 2018 |
| 3 | 5 | May 29, 2020 |
| 4 | 5 | October 30, 2020 |
| 5 | 5 | May 25, 2022 |
| 6 | 6 | October 18, 2022 |
| 7 | 8 | March 1, 2024 |
| 8 | 8 | June 18, 2025 |

=== Season 1 (2018) ===
| No. overall | No. in season | Title | Original release date |
|---|---|---|---|
| 1 | 1 | "Bangkok" | January 12, 2018 |
Phil tours a floating market by boat, samples the world's best street food in Chinatown and takes on a 25-course tasting menu with a futuristic twist.
| 2 | 2 | "Saigon" | January 12, 2018 |
A tasty trip to Saigon kicks off with pho and banh mi. Phil gets up at dawn to harvest lotus stems and learns how real Vietnamese coffee is made.
| 3 | 3 | "Tel Aviv" | January 12, 2018 |
In vibrant Tel Aviv, Phil reconnects with old friends over shakshuka, visits a synagogue-themed hummus shop and meets "the princess of soup."
| 4 | 4 | "Lisbon" | January 12, 2018 |
Phil savors Lisbon's famed pasteis de nata tarts, tours the city in a motorcycle sidecar and dines with a chef at his Michelin-starred restaurant.
| 5 | 5 | "New Orleans" | January 12, 2018 |
Phil learns how to eat crawfish, goes hog-wild at a butcher shop and meets up with friends for a Monday night tradition: red beans and rice.
| 6 | 6 | "Mexico City" | January 12, 2018 |
After a mezcal-soaked meal, Phil tries his hand at tortilla making and introduces a stranger to the wonders of tacos al pastor

=== Season 2 (2018) ===
| No. overall | No. in season | Title | Original release date |
|---|---|---|---|
| 7 | 1 | "Venice" | July 6, 2018 |
In Italy, Phil devours a sublime pork chop, pilots a gondola, dines with a famous chef, and marvels over gelato, aged cheese and balsamic vinegar.
| 8 | 2 | "Dublin" | July 6, 2018 |
With wife Monica along to trace her Irish roots, Phil feasts on boxty and seaweed, warily plays beekeeper, and learns how to pour and drink Guinness.
| 9 | 3 | "Buenos Aires" | July 6, 2018 |
Argentina delights Phil as he swoons over dulce de leche delicacies, wild boar choripán and divine cuts of beef. Bonus: He tangos and rides a horse.
| 10 | 4 | "Copenhagen" | July 6, 2018 |
Phil relishes new interpretations of Nordic classics such as smørrebrød and frikadeller before joining his family for fun and games at Tivoli Gardens.
| 11 | 5 | "Cape Town" | July 6, 2018 |
Phil gamely tries ostrich and antelope, eats with Nelson Mandela's grandson, tucks into BBQ and a family meal, and taste-tests coffee and flowers.
| 12 | 6 | "New York City" | July 6, 2018 |
Steak. Pizza. Hot dogs. Egg creams. Fall in love with Phil's New York as he noshes with friends Al Roker, Judy Gold, Elaine May and Tracy Morgan.

=== Season 3 (2020) ===
| No. overall | No. in season | Title | Original release date |
|---|---|---|---|
| 13 | 1 | "Marrakesh" | May 29, 2020 |
The warmest of welcomes greets Phil in Morocco, where he savors lamb, gets a pop quiz on spices and commits a couscous faux pas over a family dinner.
| 14 | 2 | "Chicago" | May 29, 2020 |
With daughter Lily in tow, Phil gives his arteries a workout by devouring deep-fried hot dogs, delicious pie and, of course, deep-dish pizza.
| 15 | 3 | "London" | May 29, 2020 |
Breaking bread with friends old and new, Phil indulges in gustatory delights ranging from a simple meal of fish and chips to a posh venison nosh.
| 16 | 4 | "Seoul" | May 29, 2020 |
A fan of the Korean food in LA, Phil eagerly heads to the source to try tteokbokki, feast on crab and gobble fried chicken with K-pop star Eric Nam.
| 17 | 5 | "Montréal" | May 29, 2020 |
Phil experiences the diverse city by munching on mind-blowing bagels and chicken, dining with a cheeky chef and pigging out on a wildly decadent meal.

=== Season 4 (2020) ===
| No. overall | No. in season | Title | Original release date |
|---|---|---|---|
| 18 | 1 | "Rio de Janeiro" | October 30, 2020 |
Phil feels the beat — and heat — while dancing at Carnival, sampling fruit and feijoada, sipping potent caipirinhas and pigging out at a churrascaria.
| 19 | 2 | "San Francisco" | October 30, 2020 |
In one of his favorite cities, Phil savors chocolate croissants, queasily sails the bay and visits with culinary icons Alice Waters and Thomas Keller.
| 20 | 3 | "Singapore" | October 30, 2020 |
Mouthwatering fare from the hawker markets delights Phil, who also digs into a to-die-for Peranakan meal and admires the area's stunning architecture.
| 21 | 4 | "The Mississippi Delta" | October 30, 2020 |
Phil soaks up the Southern scenery — and plenty of barbecue sauce — as he munches on ribs, fried lobster, hot tamales, alligator and a slab of steak.
| 22 | 5 | "Hawaii" | October 30, 2020 |
Exploring the aloha spirit on the beaches and beyond, Phil enjoys poke, shave ice, huli huli chicken, poi and — gasp — even a few outdoor adventures.

=== Season 5 (2022) ===
| No. overall | No. in season | Title | Original release date |
|---|---|---|---|
| 23 | 1 | "Oaxaca" | May 25, 2022 |
Phil enjoys mole, memelas, mezcal, and a worm salad on a visit to the vibrant food capital, where he also shares chicharrones with actor Jimmi Simpson.
| 24 | 2 | "Maine" | May 25, 2022 |
Phil's two main reasons for loving this destination? Lobster and family. He feasts on butter-drenched lobster rolls before visiting his cousins' farm.
| 25 | 3 | "Helsinki" | May 25, 2022 |
Phil finds a warm welcome in Finland as he eats a tasty meal in a sauna, goes fishing and tries muikku, reindeer, vorschmack, and coffee with cheese.
| 26 | 4 | "Portland" | May 25, 2022 |
Phil digs into the ecletic fare from the Pacific Northwest city's bustling food truck scene and gets salty with Top Chef favorite Shota Nakajima.
| 27 | 5 | "Madrid" | May 25, 2022 |
Tortillas, tapas, heaps of jamón and a side trip to picturesque Toledo are among the highlights from Phil's memorable first visit to Madrid.

=== Season 6 (2022) ===
| No. overall | No. in season | Title | Original release date |
|---|---|---|---|
| 28 | 1 | "Philadelphia" | October 18, 2022 |
The City of Brotherly Love opens its arms to Phil as he digs into iconic sandwiches, breaks bread with pal Patton Oswalt and samples new Philly classics.
| 29 | 2 | "Croatia" | October 18, 2022 |
Phil island-hops in Croatia, where he dons a snorkel and has a run-in with sea urchins, feasts on fresh seafood and enjoys a happy dance-inducing gelato.
| 30 | 3 | "Austin" | October 18, 2022 |
Barbecue is an art in Austin — and Phil's happy to taste new variations. He also noshes with the Taco Mafia and takes a spin in a Formula One race car.
| 31 | 4 | "Santiago" | October 18, 2022 |
Against the backdrop of the Andes, Phil goes on a sánguche crawl in Santiago, Chile, where a sandwich is elevated to a fork-and-knife experience.
| 32 | 5 | "Nashville" | October 18, 2022 |
Phil eats to the Nashville beat as he discovers red-eye gravy, challenges son Ben to a spicy chicken-eating contest and visits with famous local legends.
| 33 | 6 | "Tribute to Helen and Max" | October 18, 2022 |
Phil pays homage to his beloved parents, Helen and Max, whose warm humor brightened the show and inspired him as the creator of Everybody Loves Raymond.

=== Season 7 (2024) ===
| No. overall | No. in season | Title | Original release date |
|---|---|---|---|
| 34 | 1 | "Mumbai" | March 1, 2024 |
After a tasty tour of Mumbai's bustling street food scene, Phil joins dabbawalas in delivering meals. A legendary chef is honored at The Bombay Canteen. He visits Delhi Darbar and enjoys the famous Tandoori Chicken & Mutton Roast, he finds them the best he has ever had.
| 35 | 2 | "Washington, D.C." | March 1, 2024 |
After enjoying an epic chili dog, Phil does an intense rowing workout and meets members of Washington D.C.'s Deaf community who run a popular pizzeria.
| 36 | 3 | "Kyoto" | March 1, 2024 |
Kyoto's artful approach to dining makes Phil hungry for more as he slurps soba, meets an omurice virtuoso and wanders a market beloved by foodies.
| 37 | 4 | "Iceland" | March 1, 2024 |
Iceland's natural beauty dazzles Phil, who visits a popular bakery and chomps on street hot dogs — but is not so keen on taking a dip in icy-cold waters.
| 38 | 5 | "Dubai" | March 1, 2024 |
Cultures converge in Dubai, home to what Phil calls the "best burger ever." He also visits a traditional teahouse and sits in on a Ramadan iftar.
| 39 | 6 | "'The Real' Orlando" | March 1, 2024 |
Look beyond the theme parks to find Orlando's diverse food scene, where Phil digs into porchetta, Filipino ice cream and paella — plus a hefty cookie.
| 40 | 7 | "Taipei" | March 1, 2024 |
Phil licks his plate after an amazing meal in Taipei, savors the tantalizing aromas of Jiufen Old Street and dines with NBA star Dwight Howard.
| 41 | 8 | "Scotland" | March 1, 2024 |
Phil sips a famed Scotch whisky on the Isle of Skye. In Edinburgh, he scarfs sweets, devours haggis and in Glasgow, dines with award-winning actor Kelly Macdonald.

=== Season 8 (2025) ===
| No. overall | No. in season | Title | Original release date |
|---|---|---|---|
| 42 | 1 | "Amsterdam" | June 18, 2025 |
From herring and smoked eel to stroopwafel and pancakes, Phil samples Amsterdam's flourishing food scene and dines with Bridgerton star Claudia Jessie.
| 43 | 2 | "Basque Country of Spain" | June 18, 2025 |
Phil eats his way through the gastronomic capital of San Sebastián, savoring mouthwatering pintxos, world-renowned seafood and Txakoli wine.
| 44 | 3 | "Boston" | June 18, 2025 |
From Southie diners and North End cannolis to Peruvian cuisine in Cambridge, Phil follows the Freedom Trail through Boston's multicultural food scene.
| 45 | 4 | "Tbilisi" | June 18, 2025 |
In the birthplace of wine, Phil tries his hand at grape-picking, eats khachapuri like a mountain man and gets a massage at an ancient Georgian sauna.
| 46 | 5 | "Sydney & Adelaide" | June 18, 2025 |
Phil eats a life-changing breakfast at Bondi Beach, savors snacks and sights while sailing Sydney Harbor and visits an Aboriginal vineyard in Adelaide.
| 47 | 6 | "Las Vegas" | June 18, 2025 |
After sampling Sin City's great steakhouses with Ray Romano and Brad Garrett, Phil veers off the Strip to try bold flavors in the Vegas arts district.
| 48 | 7 | "Manila" | June 18, 2025 |
Phil feasts on pork sisig, shares a roadside lunch with jeepney drivers and survives his first "boodle fight" in this tasty tour of Filipino cuisine.
| 49 | 8 | "Guatemala" | June 18, 2025 |
Volcanic soil and vibrant culture make for a delicious experience as Phil visits Guatemala with Claudia, his family's long-time babysitter and friend.
