= Critics Choice Association =

American association of film and television critics

- Abbreviation: CCA
- Formation: 1995; 31 years ago (as the Broadcast Film Critics Association)
- Founders: Joey Berlin; Rod Lurie
- Headquarters: West Hollywood, California, U.S.
- Members: 500 voting members (2026)
- Chief executive officer: Joey Berlin
- Website: criticschoice.com
- Formerly called: Broadcast Film Critics Association

The Critics Choice Association (CCA) is an American association of film and television critics and entertainment journalists. The organization was founded in 1995 as the Broadcast Film Critics Association (BFCA). In 2011, it established the Broadcast Television Journalists Association (BTJA) as a sister organization for television critics, and in 2019 the two groups were consolidated under the current name, the Critics Choice Association.

The association presents the annual Critics Choice Awards, which recognize achievement in film and television. It also presents the Critics Choice Documentary Awards, Critics Choice Real TV Awards, and Critics Choice Super Awards, and stages the Celebration of Cinema and Television events.

== History ==
The Broadcast Film Critics Association was founded in 1995 by Joey Berlin and Rod Lurie. It had 44 members at the time of its inaugural awards ceremony. It presented its first film awards for films released in 1995.

In 2011, the BFCA created the Broadcast Television Journalists Association as a sister organization for television journalists. The BTJA presented the first Critics Choice Television Awards at the Beverly Hills Hotel on June 20, 2011. The film and television awards were combined into a single ceremony in 2016. The BFCA and BTJA merged in 2019 under the Critics Choice Association name.

== Membership ==
The association's public directory lists 500 voting members, excluding associate members. Applicants for membership must be working film critics or television journalists whose regular coverage of a broad range of current films or television series reaches a large audience. Acceptance is at the discretion of the association's board.

== Scholarships and grants ==
The association has operated a scholarship program since 2004 for college students interested in film criticism. Its published program provides financial assistance and opportunities for recipients to receive guidance from association members.

Federal tax filings document $70,000 in grants by the association to educational, film-industry, and humanitarian nonprofit organizations between 2020 and 2023. In 2022, part of the proceeds from its inaugural Celebration of Asian Pacific Cinema & Television was designated to support a film-production grant administered by the Coalition of Asian Pacifics in Entertainment.

== Awards ceremonies ==
Beginning with the 2002 ceremony, the Critics Choice Awards have been televised in the United States, airing at various times on E!, The WB, VH1, The CW, and A&E, with selected editions also simulcast on Lifetime, LMN, TBS, and USA Network. The ceremony returned to E! in 2025, expanded to a simulcast on USA Network in 2026, and was renewed on the Versant networks through 2028.

The association's principal awards and events include:

- The Critics Choice Awards, launched in 1995 as annual film awards; since 2016, the film and television awards have been presented in a combined ceremony.
- The Critics Choice Documentary Awards, first presented in 2016, for documentary film and nonfiction television.
- The Critics Choice Real TV Awards, launched in 2019 for nonfiction, unscripted, and reality television.
- The Critics Choice Super Awards, first presented in 2021, for genre film and television.
- The Celebration of Cinema and Television events, which recognize work by Black, Latino, AAPI, and LGBTQ+ artists in film and television.

A 2021 analysis by The Hollywood Reporter found that, over the preceding five years, Critics Choice winners matched the eventual Academy Award winners 73 percent of the time across six major categories: best picture, best director, and the four acting categories.
