= List of awards and nominations received by Dancing with the Stars (American TV series) =

Dancing with the Stars is an American reality competition television series for ABC and Disney+. An adaptation of the British contest show Strictly Come Dancing, the series pairs celebrities with professional dancers to compete in primarily Latin and ballroom dance routines and challenges. Each couple is scored by a panel of judges, whose points combined with audience votes determines which contestants will be eliminated as the competition progresses. The last remaining couples compete in a finale to crown the winner; these installments are highlighted by the contestants' freestyle routines.

Dancing with the Stars has been nominated for several accolades, including 132 Primetime Emmy Awards (winning 21), 14 People's Choice Awards (winning four), and eight Critics' Choice Television Awards (winning two). It won two GLAAD Media Awards for Outstanding Reality Program.

== Emmy Awards ==
=== Primetime Emmy Awards ===
Primetime Emmy Awards and nominations received by Dancing with the Stars
Year	Category	Nominee(s)	Result	Ref.
2006	Outstanding Reality Competition Program	Conrad Green, Richard Hopkins, Izzie Pick, Rob Wade, Matilda Zoltowski, Tom Bergeron, Samantha Harris, Len Goodman, Bruno Tonioli and Carrie Ann Inaba	Nominated (Note: For seasons 1–2)	
2007	Outstanding Reality Competition Program	Conrad Green, Richard Hopkins, Izzie Pick, Rob Wade, Matilda Zoltowski, Tom Bergeron, Samantha Harris, Len Goodman, Bruno Tonioli and Carrie Ann Inaba	Nominated (Note: For seasons 3–4)	
2008	Outstanding Reality Competition Program	Conrad Green, Rob Wade, Matilda Zoltowski, Michael Brooks, Joe Sungkur, Ashley Edens-Shaffer, Kim Kilbey, Victoria Guinto, Erin O'Brien and Natalee Watts (seasons 5–6)	Nominated	
2008	Outstanding Host for a Reality or Reality Competition Program	Tom Bergeron	Nominated	
2009	Outstanding Reality Competition Program	Conrad Green, Rob Wade, Matilda Zoltowski, Joe Sungkur, Ashley Edens-Shaffer, Kim Kilbey and Erin O'Brien (seasons 7–8)	Nominated	
2009	Outstanding Host for a Reality or Reality Competition Program	Tom Bergeron	Nominated	
2010	Outstanding Reality Competition Program	Conrad Green, Rob Wade, Joe Sungkur, Ashley Edens-Shaffer, Erin O'Brien, Kim Kilbey, Dan Martin, Deena Katz, Tara West, Joshua Firosz, Renana Barkan and Josh Figgs (seasons 9–10)	Nominated	
2011	Outstanding Reality Competition Program	Conrad Green, Joe Sungkur, Ashley Edens-Shaffer, Rob Wade, Kim Kilbey, Tara West, Deena Katz, Renana Barkan, Dan Martin, Joshua Firosz, Josh Figgs, Drew Seltzer and John Birkitt (seasons 11–12)	Nominated	
2012	Outstanding Reality Competition Program	Conrad Green, Joe Sungkur, Ashley Edens-Shaffer, Kim Kilbey, Tara West, Deena Katz, Renana Barkan, Dan Martin, Joshua Firosz, John Birkitt, Marcy Walton and Jonty Nash (seasons 13–14)	Nominated	
2012	Outstanding Host for a Reality or Reality Competition Program	Tom Bergeron	Won	
2013	Outstanding Reality Competition Program	Conrad Green, Joe Sungkur, Ashley Edens-Shaffer, Tara West, Deena Katz, Dan Martin, Jonty Nash, Marcy Walton, Peter Hebri and Ashley Shea Landers (seasons 15–16)	Nominated	
2013	Outstanding Host for a Reality or Reality Competition Program	Tom Bergeron	Nominated	
2013	Outstanding Choreography	Derek Hough (for "Hey Pachuco", "Para Los Rumberos" and "Walking on Air")	Won	
2013	Outstanding Choreography	Allison Holker and Derek Hough (for "Heart Cry" and "Stars")	Nominated	
2014	Outstanding Reality Competition Program	Conrad Green, Joe Sungkur, Ashley Edens-Shaffer, Tara West, Deena Katz, Dan Martin, Peter Hebri, Ryan Goble, Ashley Shea Landers, Megan Wade and Chad Harrison (seasons 17–18)	Nominated	
2015	Outstanding Reality Competition Program	Conrad Green, Joe Sungkur, Ashley Edens-Shaffer, Deena Katz, Angela Castro, Tara West, Dan Martin, Stacey Thomas-Muir, Peter Hebri, Ashley Shea Landers, Megan Wade and Shelby Wagner (seasons 19–20)	Nominated	
2016	Outstanding Reality Competition Program	Rob Wade, Joe Sungkur, Ashley Edens-Shaffer, Deena Katz, Dan Martin, Angela Castro, Tara West, Stacey Thomas-Muir, Peter Hebri, Megan Wade, Shelby Wagner, Chelsea Low and Yasmin Rawji (seasons 21–22)	Nominated	
2026	Outstanding Reality Competition Program	Conrad Green, Ryan O'Dowd, Alex Cross, Justin Mabardi, David Ruskey, Deena Katz, Dominic Chaiduang, Katie Horbury, Parker Jones, Quinn Lipton, Adam Raia, Phillip Barbb, Matt Braun, Ann Conner, Michelle DeBellis, Elizabeth Goldberg, Miguel Jefferson, Kayla Kalbfleisch, Lisa Kholostenko, Al Pop, Bryan Riches, Amanda Foto, Jasmine Monet Lesane, Jacqueline Zogas, Star Smith, Valoree Adamski and Shelby Keller (season 34)	Nominated	

=== Primetime Creative Arts Emmy Awards ===
Primetime Emmy Awards and nominations received by Dancing with the Stars
Year	Category	Nominee(s)	Result	Ref.
2006	Outstanding Choreography	Cheryl Burke (for "Episode 208 – Freestyle")	Nominated	
2006	Outstanding Choreography	Tony Dovolani (for "Episode 208 – Jive")	Nominated	
2006	Outstanding Choreography	Cheryl Burke and Nick Kosovich (for "Episode 204 – Paso Doble")	Nominated	
2006	Outstanding Art Direction for a Variety, Music Program, or Special	Patrick Doherty and James Yarnell (for "Episode 206")	Nominated	
2006	Outstanding Costumes for a Variety or Music Program	Dana Campbell and Randall Christensen (for "Episode 208A")	Won	
2006	Outstanding Technical Direction, Camerawork, Video for a Series	Diane Biederbeck, Danny Bonilla, Suzanne Ebner, Chris Gray, James Karidas, Dave Levisohn, John Pritchett, Hector Ramirez, Brian Reason, John Repczynski and Easter Xua (for "Episode 204")	Won	
2007	Outstanding Choreography	Louis van Amstel (for "Episode 303A")	Nominated	
2007	Outstanding Music Direction	Harold Wheeler (for "Episode 310")	Nominated	
2007	Outstanding Hairstyling for a Series	Mary Guerrero, Lucia Mace and Cynthia P. Romo (for "Episode 303")	Nominated	
2007	Outstanding Makeup for a Series (Non-Prosthetic)	Melanie Mills, Zena Shteysel, Patti Ramsey Bortoli and Nadege Schoenfeld (for "Episode 303")	Nominated	
2007	Outstanding Multi-Camera Picture Editing for a Series	Ned Kerwin, Pamela Malouf, David Timoner and Hans van Riet (for "Episode 304")	Nominated	
2007	Outstanding Lighting Direction (Electronic, Multi-Camera) for Variety, Music or Comedy Programming	Simon Miles (for "Episode 308")	Nominated	
2007	Outstanding Technical Direction, Camerawork, Video for a Series	Charles Ciup, Diane Biederbeck, Danny Bonilla, Dave Hilmer, James Karidas, Dave Levisohn, Hector Ramirez, Brian Reason, John Repczynski, Damien Tuffereau, Easter Xua and Chuck Reilly (for "Episode 310")	Nominated	
2008	Outstanding Choreography	Julianne Hough (for "Para Los Rumberos")	Nominated	
2008	Outstanding Hairstyling for a Multi-Camera Series or Special	Pixie Schwartz, Krista Borrelli, Ralph M. Abalos and Janice Zoladz (for "Episode 510A")	Nominated	
2008	Outstanding Makeup for a Multi-Camera Series or Special (Non-Prosthetic)	Melanie Mills, Zena Shteysel, Patti Ramsey Bortoli and Nadege Schoenfeld (for "Episode 503")	Won	
2008	Outstanding Picture Editing of Clip Packages for Talk, Performance, Award or Reality Competition Programs	David Timoner (for "Head to Head Package [610]")	Nominated	
2008	Outstanding Lighting Direction (Electronic, Multi-Camera) for Variety, Music or Comedy Programming	Simon Miles (for "Episode 510A")	Nominated	
2008	Outstanding Technical Direction, Camerawork, Video for a Series	Charles Ciup, Brian Reason, Hector Ramirez, James Karidas, Dave Levisohn, Larry Heider, Bettina Levesque, Dave Hilmer, Damien Tuffereau, Easter Xua, Mike Malone, Chuck Reilly (for "Episode 502A")	Won	
2009	Outstanding Choreography	Derek Hough and Julianne Hough (for "Great Balls of Fire")	Nominated	
2009	Outstanding Music Direction	Harold Wheeler (for "Episode 710A")	Nominated	
2009	Outstanding Hairstyling for a Multi-Camera Series or Special	Mary Guerrero, Cynthia P. Romo, Jennifer Guerrero-Mazursky and Maria Valdivia (for "Episode 709")	Won	
2009	Outstanding Makeup for a Multi-Camera Series or Special (Non-Prosthetic)	Melanie Mills, Zena Shteysel, Patti Ramsey Bortoli and Angela Moos (for "Episode 804")	Nominated	
2009	Outstanding Sound Mixing for a Variety or Music Series or Special	Evan Adelman, Eric Johnston, John Protzko, G. Butch McKarge and Boyd Wheeler (for "Episode 710A")	Nominated	
2009	Outstanding Short-Form Picture Editing	David Timoner (for "Episode 710A")	Nominated	
2009	Outstanding Lighting Direction (Electronic, Multi-Camera) for Variety, Music or Comedy Programming	Simon Miles (for "Episode 702A")	Nominated	
2009	Outstanding Technical Direction, Camerawork, Video Control for a Series	Charles Ciup, Brian Reason, Hector Ramirez, Larry Heider, Dave Levisohn, Bert Atkinson, Bettina Levesque, Mike Malone, Adam Margolis, Damien Tuffereau, Easter Xua, Chuck Reilly and Mike Snedden (for "Episode 802A")	Nominated	
2010	Outstanding Host for a Reality or Reality Competition Program	Tom Bergeron	Nominated	
2010	Outstanding Choreography	Derek Hough (for "Living on Video" and "Anything Goes")	Nominated	
2010	Outstanding Choreography	Chelsie Hightower and Derek Hough (for "Malagueña")	Nominated	
2010	Outstanding Hairstyling for a Multi-Camera Series or Special	Mary Guerrero, Kim Messina, Jennifer Guerrero-Mazursky, Maria Valdivia, Cynthia P. Romo and Cyndra Dunn (for "Episode 902A")	Won	
2010	Outstanding Makeup for a Multi-Camera Series or Special (Non-Prosthetic)	Melanie Mills, Zena Shteysel, Patti Ramsey Bortoli, Angela Moos, Barbara Fonte-Kunkel and Nadege Schoenfeld (for "Episode 901A")	Nominated	
2010	Outstanding Sound Mixing for a Variety or Music Series or Special	Evan Adelman, Eric Johnston, John Protzko and Boyd Wheeler (for "Episode 907")	Nominated	
2010	Outstanding Lighting Direction (Electronic, Multi-Camera) for Variety, Music or Comedy Programming	Simon Miles (for "Episode 909A")	Nominated	
2010	Outstanding Technical Direction, Camerawork, Video Control for a Series	Charles Ciup, Brian Reason, Hector Ramirez, Larry Heider, Dave Levisohn, Bert Atkinson, Bettina Levesque, Adam Margolis, Easter Xua, Damien Tuffereau, Mike Malone and Chuck Reilly (for "Episode 909A")	Won	
2011	Outstanding Host for a Reality or Reality Competition Program	Tom Bergeron	Nominated	
2011	Outstanding Choreography	Mark Ballas (for "I Write Sins Not Tragedies", "Hedwig's Theme" and "My Love")	Nominated	
2011	Outstanding Hairstyling for a Multi-Camera Series or Special	Kim Messina, Mary Guerrero, Cyndra Dunn, Cynthia P. Romo, Jennifer Guerrero-Mazursky and Rachel Dowling (for "Episode 1106")	Won	
2011	Outstanding Makeup for a Multi-Camera Series or Special (Non-Prosthetic)	Melanie Mills, Zena Shteysel, Patti Ramsey Bortoli, Angela Moos, Barbara Fonte-Kunkel and Nadege Schoenfeld (for "Episode 1205")	Nominated	
2011	Outstanding Lighting Design / Lighting Direction for a Variety Series	Simon Miles (for "Episode 1204A")	Nominated	
2011	Outstanding Technical Direction, Camerawork, Video Control for a Series	Charles Ciup, Brian Reason, Hector Ramirez, Larry Heider, Dave Levisohn, Bert Atkinson, Bettina Levesque, Adam Margolis, Easter Xua, Damien Tuffereau, Mike Malone, Chuck Reilly and Mike Snedden (for "Episode 1104A")	Nominated	
2012	Outstanding Choreography	Travis Wall, Teddy Forance and Nick Lazzarini (for "Without You")	Nominated	
2012	Outstanding Hairstyling for a Multi-Camera Series or Special	Mary Guerrero, Kim Messina, Jennifer Guerrero-Mazursky, Rachel Dowling, Cynthia P. Romo and Sean Smith (for "Episode 1608")	Nominated	
2012	Outstanding Makeup for a Multi-Camera Series or Special (Non-Prosthetic)	Zena Shteysel, Angela Moos, Patti Ramsey Bortoli, Barbara Fonte-Kunkel, Sarah Woolf and Nadege Schoenfeld (for "Episode 1307")	Won	
2012	Outstanding Lighting Design / Lighting Direction for a Variety Series	Simon Miles, Matthew Cotter and Suzanne Sotelo (for "Episode 1307")	Nominated	
2012	Outstanding Technical Direction, Camerawork, Video Control for a Series	Charles Ciup, Seth Saint Vincent, Adam Margolis, Easter Xua, Larry Heider, Dave Levisohn, Bert Atkinson, Brian Reason, Damien Tuffereau, Hector Ramirez, Mike Malone, Bettina Levesque, Ron Lehman, Rob Palmer and Chuck Reilly (for "Episode 1410A")	Nominated	
2013	Outstanding Art Direction for Variety or Nonfiction Programming	James Yarnell, David Edwards and Jason Howard (for "Episode 1608A")	Nominated	
2013	Outstanding Hairstyling for a Multi-Camera Series or Special	Mary Guerrero, Kim Messina, Jennifer Guerrero-Mazursky, Sean Smith, Cyndra Dunn and Gail Rowell-Ryan (for "Episode 1407")	Nominated	
2013	Outstanding Makeup for a Multi-Camera Series or Special (Non-Prosthetic)	Zena Shteysel, Angela Moos, Patti Ramsey-Bortoli, Julie Socash, Alison Gladieux and Donna Bard (for "Episode 1307")	Nominated	
2013	Outstanding Lighting Design / Lighting Direction for a Variety Series	Simon Miles, Matthew Cotter and Suzanne Sotelo (for "Episode 1307")	Nominated	
2013	Outstanding Technical Direction, Camerawork, Video Control for a Series	Charles Ciup, Bert Atkinson, Larry Heider, Bettina Levesque, Dave Levisohn, Mike Malone, Adam Margolis, Rob Palmer, Hector Ramirez, Brian Reason, Seth Saint Vincent, Damien Tuffereau, Easter Xua, Ron Lehman and John O'Brien (for "Episode 1610A")	Nominated	
2014	Outstanding Host for a Reality or Reality Competition Program	Tom Bergeron	Nominated	
2014	Outstanding Choreography	Derek Hough (for "Human", "Ameksa" and "Too Darn Hot")	Nominated	
2014	Outstanding Hairstyling for a Multi-Camera Series or Special	Mary Guerrero, Kim Messina, Jennifer Guerrero-Mazursky, Sean Smith, Cyndra Dunn and Gail Rowell-Ryan (for "Episode 1608")	Nominated	
2014	Outstanding Makeup for a Multi-Camera Series or Special (Non-Prosthetic)	Zena Shteysel, Angela Moos, Patti Ramsey Bortoli, Barbara Fonte-Kunkel, Sarah Woolf and Julie Socash (for "Episode 1603")	Nominated	
2014	Outstanding Lighting Design / Lighting Direction for a Variety Series	Simon Miles, Matthew Cotter and Suzanne Sotelo (for "Episode 1711A")	Won	
2014	Outstanding Technical Direction, Camerawork, Video Control for a Series	Charles Ciup, Bert Atkinson, Larry Heider, Bettina Levesque, Dave Levisohn, Mike Malone, Adam Margolis, Rob Palmer, Hector Ramirez, Brian Reason, Seth Saint Vincent, Damien Tuffereau, Easter Xua and Chris Gray (for "Episode 1711A")	Won	
2015	Outstanding Host for a Reality or Reality Competition Program	Tom Bergeron	Nominated	
2015	Outstanding Choreography	Derek Hough, Julianne Hough and Tessandra Chavez (for "Elastic Heart")	Won	
2015	Outstanding Choreography	Witney Carson (for "369", "It's Not Unusual" and "Sing with a Swing-Apache")	Nominated	
2015	Outstanding Hairstyling for a Multi-Camera Series or Special	Mary Guerrero, Kim Messina, Jennifer Guerrero-Mazursky, Sean Smith, Gail Rowell-Ryan and Dean Banowetz (for "Episode 1907")	Nominated	
2015	Outstanding Makeup for a Multi-Camera Series or Special (Non-Prosthetic)	Zena Shteysel, Angela Moos, Patti Ramsey Bortoli, Julie Socash, Alison Gladieux and Sarah Woolf (for "Episode 1907")	Nominated	
2015	Outstanding Lighting Design / Lighting Direction for a Variety Series	Simon Miles, Matthew Cotter and Suzanne Sotelo (for "Episode 1911A")	Nominated	
2015	Outstanding Technical Direction, Camerawork, Video Control for a Series	Charles Ciup, Bert Atkinson, Nat Havholm, Ron Lehman, Bettina Levesque, Mike Malone, Adam Margolis, Rob Palmer, Hector Ramirez, Brian Reason, Damien Tuffereau, Jeff Wheat, Easter Xua, Chris Hill and Ed Moore (for "Episode 2009")	Won	
2016	Outstanding Host for a Reality or Reality Competition Program	Tom Bergeron	Nominated	
2016	Outstanding Choreography	Derek Hough (for "Footprints in the Sand", "Grace Kelly" and "Cry Little Sister")	Nominated	
2016	Outstanding Hairstyling for a Multi-Camera Series or Special	Mary Guerrero, Kim Messina, Gail Ryan, Jennifer Guerrero, Sean Smith and Dean Banowetz (for "The Finals, Part 1")	Nominated	
2016	Outstanding Makeup for a Multi-Camera Series or Special (Non-Prosthetic)	Zena Shteysel, Angela Moos, Patti Ramsey Bortoli, Sarah Woolf, Julie Socash and Alison Gladieux (for "Halloween Night")	Nominated	
2016	Outstanding Costumes for a Variety, Nonfiction or Reality Programming	Daniela Gschwendtner, Steven Lee, Polina Roytman, Karina Torrico and Howard Sussman (for "Disney Night")	Nominated	
2016	Outstanding Lighting Design / Lighting Direction for a Variety Series	Simon Miles, Matthew Cotter and Suzanne Sotelo (for "The Finals, Part 2")	Nominated	
2016	Outstanding Technical Direction, Camerawork, Video Control for a Series	Charles Ciup, Brian Reason, Hector Ramirez, Nat Havholm, Jeff Wheat, Bert Atkinson, Bettina Levesque, Adam Margolis, Damien Tuffereau, Easter Xua, Mike Malone, Rob Palmer, Ron Lehman, Keith Dicker, Mike Carr, Ed Horton, Dylan Sanford, Freddy Frederick, Chris Hill and Ed Moore (for "The Finals, Part 2")	Won	
2017	Outstanding Choreography	Mandy Moore (for "On Top of the World" and "Carol of the Bells")	Won	
2017	Outstanding Choreography	Derek Hough (for "Kairos")	Nominated	
2017	Outstanding Hairstyling for a Multi-Camera Series or Special	Mary Guerrero, Kim Messina, Gail Ryan, Derrick Spruill, Rene Vaca and Patricia Pineda (for "A Night at the Movies")	Nominated	
2017	Outstanding Makeup for a Multi-Camera Series or Special (Non-Prosthetic)	Zena Shteysel, Angela Moos, Julie Socash, Patti Ramsey Bortoli, Sarah Woolf and Donna Bard (for "Halloween Night")	Nominated	
2017	Outstanding Costumes for a Variety, Nonfiction or Reality Programming	Daniela Gschwendtner, Steven Lee, Polina Roytman, Karina Torrico and Howard Sussman (for "Halloween Night")	Nominated	
2017	Outstanding Lighting Design / Lighting Direction for a Variety Series	Simon Miles, Matthew Cotter, Suzanne Sotelo and Matt McAdam (for "Cirque Du Soleil Night")	Won	
2017	Outstanding Technical Direction, Camerawork, Video Control for a Series	Charles Cuip, Chris Hill, Ed Moore, Brian Reason, Ron Lehman, Nathanial Havholm, Bettina Levesque, Bert Atkinson, Daryl Studebaker, Adam Margolis, Damien Tuffereau, Andy Waruszewski, Mike Malone, Mike Carr, Rob Palmer, Keith Dicker, Freddy Frederick, Ed Horton and Helena Jackson (for "Episode 2311A")	Won	
2018	Outstanding Production Design for a Variety, Reality or Reality Competition Series	James Yarnell, Steve Morden and John Sparano (for "Night at the Movies," "Halloween" and "Finale")	Nominated	
2018	Outstanding Hairstyling for a Multi-Camera Series or Special	Kimi Messina, Gail Ryan, Derrick Spruill, Rene Vaca, Patricia Pineda and Pixie Schwartz (for "Night at the Movies")	Nominated	
2018	Outstanding Makeup for a Multi-Camera Series or Special (Non-Prosthetic)	Zena Shteysel, Angela Moos, Julie Socash, Patti Ramsey-Bortoli, Sarah Woolf and Donna Bard (for "Halloween Night")	Nominated	
2018	Outstanding Costumes for a Variety, Nonfiction or Reality Programming	Daniela Gschwendtner, Steven Lee, Polina Roytman, Candice Rainwater and Howard Sussman (for "Disney Night")	Nominated	
2018	Outstanding Lighting Design / Lighting Direction for a Variety Series	Simon Miles, Matthew Cotter, Suzanne Sotelo and Matt McAdam (for "Halloween Night")	Nominated	
2018	Outstanding Technical Direction, Camerawork, Video Control for a Series	Charles Ciup, David Bernstein, Chris Hill, Ed Moore, Brian Reason, Ron Lehman, Nathanial Havholm, Bettina Levesque, Bert Atkinson, Daryl Studebaker, Adam Margolis, Damien Tuffereau, Andrew Waruszewski, Andrew Georgopolis, Rob Palmer, Dylan Sanford, Jeff Wheat, Mike Carr, Keith Dicker, Dave Eastwood, Travis Hays and Helena Jackson (for "Finale")	Nominated	
2019	Outstanding Hairstyling for a Multi-Camera Series or Special	Kimi Messina, Gail Ryan, Cheryl Eckert, Brittany Spaulding, Rhonda O'Neil and Jani Kleibard (for "Halloween Night")	Nominated	
2019	Outstanding Makeup for a Multi-Camera Series or Special (Non-Prosthetic)	Zena Shteysel, Angela Moos, Patti Ramsey-Bortoli, Julie Socash, Alison Gladieux and Donna Bard (for "Halloween Night")	Nominated	
2019	Outstanding Costumes for a Variety, Nonfiction or Reality Programming	Daniela Gschwendtner, Steven Lee, Polina Roytman, Candice Rainwater and Howard Sussman (for "The Premiere")	Nominated	
2019	Outstanding Lighting Design / Lighting Direction for a Variety Series	Simon Miles, Suzanne Sotelo, Pete Radice and Matt McAdam (for "Semi-Finals")	Nominated	
2020	Outstanding Contemporary Hairstyling for a Variety, Nonfiction or Reality Program	Mary Guerrero, Kimi Messina, Gail Ryan, Cheryl Eckert, Jennifer Guerrero, Jani Kleinbard, Amber Maher and Patricia Pineda (for "Episode 2802")	Nominated	
2020	Outstanding Contemporary Makeup for a Variety, Nonfiction or Reality Program	Zena Shteysel Green, Angela Moos, Patti Ramsey-Bortoli, Sarah Woolf, Julie Socash, Alison Gladieux, Donna Bard and Nadege Schoenfeld (for "Disney Night")	Nominated	
2020	Outstanding Costumes for a Variety, Nonfiction or Reality Programming	Daniela Gschwendtner, Steven Lee, Howard Sussman, Polina Roytman and Karina Torrico (for "Halloween Night")	Nominated	
2021	Outstanding Choreography for Variety or Reality Programming	Derek Hough (for "Paso Doble – Uccen" and "Tap Dance – Let's Fall in Love for the Night")	Won	
2021	Outstanding Choreography for Variety or Reality Programming	Artem Chigvintsev (for "Argentine Tango – Toxic" and "Freestyle – Sparkling Diamonds")	Nominated	
2021	Outstanding Contemporary Hairstyling for a Variety, Nonfiction or Reality Program	Kimi Messina, Gail Ryan, Jani Kleinbard, Amber Maher, Roma Goddard, Regina Rodriguez, Megg Massey and Arrick Anderson (for "Finale")	Nominated	
2021	Outstanding Contemporary Makeup for a Variety, Nonfiction or Reality Program	Zena Shteysel Green, Julie Socash, Donna Bard, Sarah Woolf, Alison Gladieux, Victor Del Castillo, Rosetta Garcia and Lois Harriman (for "Top 11")	Nominated	
2021	Outstanding Lighting Design / Lighting Direction for a Variety Series	Tom Sutherland, Joe Holdman, Alexander Taylor, Nathan Files and Matt McAdam (for "Finale")	Nominated	
2022	Outstanding Choreography for Variety or Reality Programming	Daniella Karagach (for "I Got 5 on It" and "Dark Fantasy")	Nominated	
2022	Outstanding Lighting Design / Lighting Direction for a Variety Series	Tom Sutherland, Joe Holdman, Nate Files and Matt McAdam (for "Finale")	Nominated	
2022	Outstanding Technical Direction, Camerawork, Video Control for a Series	Charles Ciup, Christine Salomon, Brian Reason, Bettina Levesque, Daryl Studebaker, Bruce Green, Bert Atkinson, Nat Havholm, Ron Lehman, Mike Carr, Adam Margolis, Damien Tuffereau, Easter Xua, Derek Pratt, Mark Koonce, Allen Merriweather, Andrew Georgopoulos, Luke Chantrell and Ed Moore (for "Horror Night")	Nominated	
2023	Outstanding Choreography for Variety or Reality Programming	Derek Hough (for "Higher")	Won	
2023	Outstanding Lighting Design / Lighting Direction for a Variety Series	Noah Mitz, Michael Berger, Patrick Brazil, Andrew Law, Matt Benson, Matt McAdam and Luke Chantrell (for "Semi Finals")	Won	
2023	Outstanding Technical Direction, Camerawork, Video Control for a Series	Charles Ciup, David Bernstein, Bert Atkinson, Terry Clark, Kary D'Alessandro, James Garcia, Nathanial Havholm, Mark Koonce, Tim Lee, Ron Lehman, Bettina Levesque, Dave Levisohn, Adam Margolis, Derek Pratt, Brian Reason, Philo Solomon, Daryl Studebaker, Marc Stumpo, Damien Tuffereau and Cary Symmons (for "Finale")	Won	
2024	Outstanding Choreography for Variety or Reality Programming	Valentin Chmerkovskiy and Jenna Johnson (for "Moon River" and "La Vie en rose")	Nominated	
2024	Outstanding Hairstyling for a Variety, Nonfiction or Reality Program	Kimi Messina, Dwayne Ross, Joe Matke, Jani Kleinbard, Amber Maher, Marion Rogers, Brittany Spaulding (for "Finale")	Nominated	
2024	Outstanding Makeup for a Variety, Nonfiction or Reality Program	Zena S. Green, Julie Socash, Angela Moos, Donna Bard, Sarah Woolf, Brian Sipe, James MacKinnon and Tyson Fountaine (for "Monster Night")	Nominated	
2024	Outstanding Lighting Design / Lighting Direction for a Variety Series	Noah Mitz, Patrick Brazil, Andrew Law, Casey Rhodes, Hannah Kerman, Matt Benson, Ed Moore, Stu Wesolik and Matt McAdam (for "Semi-Finals")	Nominated	
2024	Outstanding Technical Direction, Camerawork, Video Control for a Series	Charles Ciup, Dave Bernstein, Bert Atkinson, Jonas Brueling, Mike Carr, Jimmy Garcia, Bruce Green, Nathanial Havholm, Ron Lehman, Bettina Levesque, Adam Margolis, Rob Palmer, Derek Pratt, Brian Reason, Jofre Rosero, Daniel Schade, Daryl Studebaker, Cary Symmons and Easter Xua (for "Finale")	Nominated	
2025	Outstanding Hairstyling for a Variety, Nonfiction or Reality Program	Kimi Messina, Joe Matke, Marion Rogers, Amber Maher, Florence Witherspoon, Brittany Spaulding and Melanie Ervin (for "Halloween Nightmares")	Nominated	
2025	Outstanding Makeup for a Variety, Nonfiction or Reality Program	Zena S. Green, Julie Socash, Donna Bard, Lois Harriman, Brian Sipe, James MacKinnon, Tyson Fountaine and Angela Moos (for "Halloween Nightmares")	Nominated	
2025	Outstanding Lighting Design / Lighting Direction for a Variety Series	Noah Mitz, Madigan Stehly, Patrick Brazil, Joe Holdman, Matt Benson, Matt McAdam, Ed Moore and Kevin Faust (for "Semi-Finals")	Nominated	
2026	Outstanding Hairstyling for a Variety, Nonfiction or Reality Program	Kimi Messina, Marion Rogers, Joe Matke, Florence Witherspoon, Jerilynn Stephens, Amber Nicholle Maher, Brittany Spaulding and Regina Rodriguez	Nominated	
2026	Outstanding Makeup for a Variety, Nonfiction or Reality Program	Julie Socash, Angela Moos, Brian Sipe, Vance Hartwell, Josh Foster, Alison Gladieux, Sarah Benjamin Hall and Donna Bard	Nominated	
2026	Outstanding Lighting Design / Lighting Direction for a Series	Noah Mitz, Madigan Stehly, Hannah Kerman, William Gossett, Patrick Brazil, Joe Holdman, Matt Benson, Matt McAdam, Alan Pineda and Kevin Faust	Nominated	
2026	Outstanding Technical Direction and Camerawork for a Series	Charles Ciup, Ron Brasi, Daryl Studebaker, Bettina Levesque, Kary D’Alessandro, Bruce Green, Rob Palmer, Daniel Schade, Nathanial Havholm, Mike Carr, Ed Horton, Easter Xua, Brian Reason, Adam Margolis, Jonas Brueling, Dave Levisohn, Jimmy Garcia, Damien Tuffereau, Emilie Pesante and Ron Lehman	Pending	

== Critics' Choice Awards ==
=== Critics' Choice Television Awards ===
Critics' Choice Television Awards and nominations received by Dancing with the Stars
Year	Category	Nominee(s)	Result	Ref.
2011	Best Reality Series – Competition	Dancing with the Stars	Nominated	
2011	Best Reality Show Host	Tom Bergeron	Nominated	
2012	Best Reality Series – Competition	Dancing with the Stars	Nominated	
2012	Best Reality Show Host	Tom Bergeron	Won (Note: Tied with Cat Deeley for So You Think You Can Dance.)	
2013	Best Reality Show Host	Tom Bergeron	Won	
2014	Best Reality Show Host	Tom Bergeron	Nominated	
2015	Best Reality Show Host	Tom Bergeron	Nominated	
2015	Best Reality Series – Competition	Dancing with the Stars	Nominated	
2016	Best Reality Show Host	Tom Bergeron	Nominated	
2018	Best Reality Show Host	Tom Bergeron	Nominated	
2018	Best Reality Competition Series	Dancing with the Stars	Nominated	

=== Critics' Choice Real TV Awards ===
Critics' Choice Real TV Awards and nominations received by Dancing with the Stars
Year	Category	Nominee(s)	Result	Ref.
2020	Best Competition Series: Talent/Variety	Dancing with the Stars	Nominated	
2020	Best Ensemble Cast in an Unscripted Series	Dancing with the Stars	Nominated	
2021	Best Live Show	Dancing with the Stars	Won	
2022	Best Competition Series: Talent/Variety	Dancing with the Stars	Nominated	
2022	Best Ensemble Cast in an Unscripted Series	Dancing with the Stars	Nominated	
2023	Best Competition Series: Talent/Variety	Dancing with the Stars	Nominated	
2023	Best Ensemble Cast in an Unscripted Series	Dancing with the Stars	Nominated	
2024	Best Competition Series: Talent/Variety	Dancing with the Stars	Nominated	
2025	Best Competition Series: Talent/Variety	Dancing with the Stars	Won	
2025	Best Ensemble Cast in an Unscripted Series	Dancing with the Stars	Nominated	
2025	Male Star of the Year	Stephen Nedoroscik	Won	
2025	Female Star of the Year	Julianne Hough	Nominated	
2026	Best Competition Series: Talent/Variety	Dancing with the Stars	Won	
2026	Best Ensemble Cast in an Unscripted Series	Dancing with the Stars	Nominated	
2026	Male Star of the Year	Robert Irwin	Nominated	
2026	Female Star of the Year	Whitney Leavitt (Note: Also for The Secret Lives of Mormon Wives)	Nominated	

== Industry awards ==
Awards and nominations received by Dancing with the Stars
Award	Year	Category	Nominee(s)	Result	Ref.
ACE Eddie Awards	2008	Best Edited Reality Series	Pam Malouf, Hans Van Riet and David Timoner (for "Episode 404")	Nominated	
ACE Eddie Awards	2024	Best Edited Non-Scripted Series	Laurens Van Charante, Ben Bulatao, Fernanda Cardoso, Jessie Sock, Jon Oliver, Neal Acosta, Raiko Siems, Joe Headrick and Mike Bennaton (for "Most Memorable Year Night")	Nominated	
Costume Designers Guild Awards	2008	Outstanding Contemporary Television	Randall Christensen	Nominated	
Costume Designers Guild Awards	2009	Outstanding Contemporary Television	Randall Christensen	Nominated	
Costume Designers Guild Awards	2010	Outstanding Contemporary Television	Randall Christensen	Nominated	
Costume Designers Guild Awards	2011	Outstanding Contemporary Television	Randall Christensen, Daniella Gschwendtner and Steven Norman Lee	Nominated	
Costume Designers Guild Awards	2020	Excellence in Variety, Reality Competition, or Live Television	Daniela Gschwendtner and Steven Norman Lee	Nominated (Note: For "First Elimination")	
Costume Designers Guild Awards	2021	Excellence in Variety, Reality Competition, or Live Television	Daniela Gschwendtner and Steven Norman Lee	Nominated (Note: For "Villains Night")	
Costume Designers Guild Awards	2022	Excellence in Variety, Reality Competition, or Live Television	Daniela Gschwendtner and Steven Norman Lee	Nominated (Note: For "Semi-Finals")	
Costume Designers Guild Awards	2023	Excellence in Variety, Reality Competition, or Live Television	Daniela Gschwendtner and Steven Norman Lee	Nominated (Note: For "Halloween Night")	
Costume Designers Guild Awards	2024	Excellence in Variety, Reality Competition, or Live Television	Daniela Gschwendtner and Steven Norman Lee	Nominated (Note: For "Monster Night")	
Costume Designers Guild Awards	2025	Excellence in Variety, Reality Competition, or Live Television	Daniela Gschwendtner and Steven Norman Lee	Nominated (Note: For "Soul Train Night")	
Costume Designers Guild Awards	2026	Excellence in Variety, Reality Competition, or Live Television	Daniela Gschwendtner, Steven Norman Lee and Karina Torrico	Nominated (Note: For "Premiere")	
Make-Up Artists & Hair Stylists Guild Awards	2015	Best Contemporary Hair Styling in Television and New Media Series	Mary Guerrero, Kim Messina and Jennifer Guerrero-Mazursky	Won	
Make-Up Artists & Hair Stylists Guild Awards	2015	Best Contemporary Makeup in Television and New Media Series	Zena Shteysel, Angela Moos and Patti Ramsey Bortoli	Nominated	
Make-Up Artists & Hair Stylists Guild Awards	2016	Best Contemporary Hair Styling in Television and New Media Series	Mary Guerrero, Kim Messina and Jennifer Guerrero-Mazursky	Won	
Make-Up Artists & Hair Stylists Guild Awards	2016	Best Contemporary Makeup in Television and New Media Series	Zena Shteysel, Angela Moos and Patti Ramsey Bortoli	Won	
Make-Up Artists & Hair Stylists Guild Awards	2017	Best Contemporary Hair Styling in Television and New Media Series	Mary Guerrero, Kim Messina and Gail Rowell-Ryan	Won	
Make-Up Artists & Hair Stylists Guild Awards	2018	Best Contemporary Hair Styling in Television and New Media Series	Gail Rowell-Ryan, Brittany Spaulding and Jani Kleinbard	Won	
Make-Up Artists & Hair Stylists Guild Awards	2018	Best Contemporary Makeup in Television and New Media Series	Julie Socash, Alison Gladieux and Donna Bard	Nominated	
Make-Up Artists & Hair Stylists Guild Awards	2019	Best Contemporary Hair Styling in a Motion Picture Made for Television or Special	Mary Guerrero, Kimi Messina and Gail Ryan	Won	
Make-Up Artists & Hair Stylists Guild Awards	2019	Best Contemporary Makeup in a Motion Picture Made for Television or Special	Julie Socash, Alison Gladieux and Donna Bard	Nominated	
Make-Up Artists & Hair Stylists Guild Awards	2020	Best Contemporary Hair Styling in a Television Special, One Hour or More Live Program Series or Movie for Television	Louie Zakarian, Amy Tagliamonti, Jason Milani and Joanna Pisani	Won	
Make-Up Artists & Hair Stylists Guild Awards	2020	Best Contemporary Makeup in a Television Special, One-Hour or More Live Program Series or Movie for Television	Louie Zakarian, Amy Tagliamonti, Jason Milani and Joanna Pisani	Won	
Make-Up Artists & Hair Stylists Guild Awards	2021	Best Contemporary Hair Styling in a Television Special, One Hour or More Live Program Series or Movie for Television	Jani Kleinbard, Gail Ryan, Cheryl Eckert and Regina Rodriquez	Won	
Make-Up Artists & Hair Stylists Guild Awards	2021	Best Contemporary Makeup in a Television Special, One-Hour or More Live Program Series or Movie for Television	Julie Socash, Alison Gladieux, Donna Bard and Barbi Fonte	Nominated	
Make-Up Artists & Hair Stylists Guild Awards	2021	Best Period Hair Styling and/or Character Hair Styling in a Television Special, One-Hour or More Live Program Series or Movie for Television	Brittany Spaulding, Tiphanie Baum, Patricia Pineda and Arrick Anderson	Nominated	
Make-Up Artists & Hair Stylists Guild Awards	2021	Best Special Makeup Effects in a Television Special, One-Hour or More Live Program Series or Movie for Television	Brian Sipe, Julie Socash, Vance Hartwell and Kato DeStefan	Nominated	
Make-Up Artists & Hair Stylists Guild Awards	2022	Best Contemporary Hair Styling in a Television Special, One Hour or More Live Program Series	Kimi Messina, Jani Kleinbard, Cheryl Eckert and Gail Ryan	Nominated	
Make-Up Artists & Hair Stylists Guild Awards	2022	Best Contemporary Makeup in a Television Special, One Hour or More Live Program Series	Julie Socash, Donna Bard, Alison L. Gladieux and Farah Bunch	Nominated	
Make-Up Artists & Hair Stylists Guild Awards	2022	Best Period Hair Styling and/or Character Hair Styling in a Television Special, One Hour or More Live Program Series	Kimi Messina, Johnny Lomeli, Megg Massey and Jani Kleinbard	Nominated	
Make-Up Artists & Hair Stylists Guild Awards	2022	Best Special Makeup Effects in a Television Special, One Hour or More Live Program Series	Brian Sipe, Julie Socash, Bianca Marie Appice and David Snyder	Nominated	
Make-Up Artists & Hair Stylists Guild Awards	2023	Best Contemporary Hair Styling in a Television Special, One Hour or More Live Program Series	Dwayne Ross, Joe Matke, Amber Nicholle Maher and Marion Rogers	Won	
Make-Up Artists & Hair Stylists Guild Awards	2023	Best Contemporary Makeup in a Television Special, One Hour or More Live Program Series	Julie Socash, Donna Bard, Lois Harriman and Sarah Woolf	Won	
Make-Up Artists & Hair Stylists Guild Awards	2023	Best Period Hair Styling and/or Character Hair Styling in a Television Special, One Hour or More Live Program Series	Kimi Messina, Dwayne Ross, Joe Matke and Brittany Spaulding	Won	
Make-Up Artists & Hair Stylists Guild Awards	2023	Best Period and/or Character Makeup in a Television Special, One Hour or More Live Program Series	Julie Socash, Brian Sipe, James MacKinnon and Tyson Fountaine	Nominated	
Make-Up Artists & Hair Stylists Guild Awards	2023	Best Special Makeup Effects in a Television Special, One Hour or More Live Program Series	Brian Sipe, James MacKinnon, Cary Ayers and Julie Socash	Nominated	
Make-Up Artists & Hair Stylists Guild Awards	2024	Best Contemporary Hair Styling in a Television Special, One Hour or More Live Program Series	Joe Matke, Marion Rogers, Amber Nicholle Maher and Florence Witherspoon	Won	
Make-Up Artists & Hair Stylists Guild Awards	2024	Best Contemporary Makeup in a Television Special, One Hour or More Live Program Series	Zena Green, Julie Socash, Angela Moos, Alison Gladieux and Glen Alen	Nominated	
Make-Up Artists & Hair Stylists Guild Awards	2024	Best Period Hair Styling and/or Character Hair Styling in a Television Special, One Hour or More Live Program Series	Joe Matke, Marion Rogers, Amber Nicholle Maher and Florence Witherspoon	Nominated	
Make-Up Artists & Hair Stylists Guild Awards	2024	Best Period and/or Character Makeup in a Television Special, One Hour or More Live Program Series	Julie A. Socash, Angela Moos, Donna Bard, Louis Harriman and Tyson Fountaine	Nominated	
Make-Up Artists & Hair Stylists Guild Awards	2024	Best Special Makeup Effects in a Television Special, One Hour or More Live Program Series	Brian Sipe, James MacKinnon and Julie Socash	Nominated	
Make-Up Artists & Hair Stylists Guild Awards	2025	Best Contemporary Hair Styling in a Television Special, One Hour or More Live Program Series	Marion Rogers, Brittany Spaulding, Amber Nicholle Maher, Florence Witherspoon and Regina Rodriguez	Won	
Make-Up Artists & Hair Stylists Guild Awards	2025	Best Contemporary Makeup in a Television Special, One Hour or More Live Program Series	Zena Green, Angela Moos, Alison Gladieux, Farah Bunch and Sarah Benjamin Hall	Nominated	
Make-Up Artists & Hair Stylists Guild Awards	2025	Best Period Hair Styling and/or Character Hair Styling in a Television Special, One Hour or More Live Program Series	Marion Rogers, Brittany Spaulding, Amber Nicholle Maher, Florence Witherspoon and Regina Rodriguez	Nominated	
Make-Up Artists & Hair Stylists Guild Awards	2025	Best Period and/or Character Makeup in a Television Special, One Hour or More Live Program Series	Brian Sipe, Julie Socash, John Foster, Vance Hartwell and Donna Bard	Nominated	

== Other awards ==
Awards and nominations received by Dancing with the Stars
Award	Year	Category	Nominee(s)	Result	Ref.
ALMA Awards	2012	Favorite TV Reality, Variety, or Comedy Personality or Act	William Levy	Nominated	
ASCAP Film and Television Music Awards	2009	Top Television Series	Daniel McGrath and Josh Phillips	Won	
ASCAP Film and Television Music Awards	2012	Top Television Series	Daniel McGrath and Josh Phillips	Won	
Astra TV Awards	2025	Best Reality Competition Series	Dancing with the Stars	Nominated	
Astra TV Awards	2026	Best Reality Competition Series	Dancing with the Stars	Won	
GLAAD Media Awards	2012	Outstanding Reality Program	Dancing with the Stars	Won	
GLAAD Media Awards	2022	Outstanding Reality Program	Dancing with the Stars	Nominated	
GLAAD Media Awards	2023	Outstanding Reality Competition Program	Dancing with the Stars	Won	
GLAAD Media Awards	2026	Outstanding Reality Competition Program	Dancing with the Stars	Nominated	
NAACP Image Awards	2006	Outstanding Reality Series	Dancing with the Stars	Nominated	
NAACP Image Awards	2007	Outstanding Reality Series	Dancing with the Stars	Nominated	
NAACP Image Awards	2009	Outstanding Reality Series	Dancing with the Stars	Nominated	
NAACP Image Awards	2010	Outstanding Reality Series	Dancing with the Stars	Nominated	
NAACP Image Awards	2012	Outstanding Reality Series	Dancing with the Stars	Nominated	
NAACP Image Awards	2015	Outstanding Reality Series	Dancing with the Stars	Nominated	
NAACP Image Awards	2024	Outstanding Host in a Reality, Game Show or Variety (Series or Special)	Alfonso Ribeiro	Nominated	
