= Make-Up Artists & Hair Stylists Guild Awards 2020 =

Entertainment award

- Date: April 3, 2021
- Site: The Beverly Hilton, California

The 13th Make-Up Artists and Hair Stylists Guild Awards are presented by the Make-Up Artists and Hair Stylists Guild to honor the best make-up and hairstyling in film and television for 2020, the winners were announced in a virtual ceremony on April 3, 2021 while the nominees were announced on February 18, 2021.

== Winners and nominees ==
=== Feature-Length Motion Picture ===
Best Contemporary Make-Up	Best Contemporary Hair Styling
Birds of Prey (and the Fantabulous Emancipation of One Harley Quinn) – Deborah Lamia Denaver, Sabrina Wilson, Miho Suzuki, Cale Thomas; Bill & Ted Face the Music – Bill Corso, Dennis Liddiard, Stephen Kelley; Borat Subsequent Moviefilm – Katy Fray, Lisa Layman, Thomas Kolarek; The Prom – Eryn Krueger Mekash, J. Roy Helland, Kyra Panchenko, Donald McInnes; Promising Young Woman – Angela Wells, Brigitte Hennech, Adam Christopher	Birds of Prey (and the Fantabulous Emancipation of One Harley Quinn) – Adruitha Lee, Cassie Russek, Margarita Pidgeon, Nikki Nelms; Bill & Ted Face the Music – Donna Spahn-Jones, Budd Bird, Jeri Baker, Ulla Gaudin; Borat Subsequent Moviefilm – Kimberly Boyenger, Tyler Ely; The Prom – Chris Clark, Natalie Driscoll, Ka’Maura Eley, J. Roy Helland; Promising Young Woman – Daniel Curet, Bryson Conley, Lee Ann Brittenham
Best Period and/or Character Make-Up	Best Period Hair Styling and/or Character Hair Styling
Ma Rainey's Black Bottom – Matiki Anoff, Sergio Lopez-Rivera, Carl Fullerton, Debi Young; Bill & Ted Face the Music – Bill Corso, Dennis Liddiard, Stephen Kelley, Bianca Appice; Hillbilly Elegy – Eryn Krueger Mekash, Jamie Hess, Devin Morales, Jessica Gambardella; Mank – Gigi Williams, Michelle Audrina Kim; Mulan – Denise Kum, Rick Findlater, Georgia Lockhart-Adams, James MacKinnon	Ma Rainey's Black Bottom – Mia Neal, Larry Cherry, Leah Loukas, Tywan Williams; Hillbilly Elegy – Patricia Dehaney, Tony Ward, Martial Corneville, Stacey Butterworth; Mank – Kimberley Spiteri, Colleen LaBaff; Mulan – Denise Kum, Rick Findlater, Georgia Lockhart-Adams, Terry Baliel; Jingle Jangle: A Christmas Journey – Sharon Martin, Kat Fa
Best Special Effects Make-Up
Pinocchio – Mark Coulier; Bill & Ted Face the Music – Bill Corso, Kevin Yagher, Steve Wang, Stephen Kelley; Hillbilly Elegy – Elegy Eryn Krueger Mekash, Matthew Mungle, Jamie Hess; Mulan – Denise Kum, Chris Fitzpatrick; The United States vs. Billie Holiday – Adrien Morot; Wonder Woman 1984 – Jan Sewell, Mark Coulier

=== Television Series, Limited or Miniseries or Television New Media Series ===
Best Contemporary Make-Up	Best Contemporary Hair Styling
Westworld – Elisa Marsh, John Damiani, Jennifer Aspinall, Rachel Hoke; Dead to Me – Jacqueline Knowlton, Toryn Reed, Kim Greene, Liz Lash; Grace and Frankie – Melissa Sandora, David De Leon, Bonita De Haven; Ozark – Tracy Ewell, Jillian Erickson, Susan Reilly Lehane; RuPaul's Drag Race – Natasha Marcelina, Jen Fregozo; Schitt's Creek – Candice Ornstein, Kerry Vaughan	Schitt's Creek – Annastasia Cucullo, Ana Sorys; Empire – Melissa Forney, Nolan Kelly, Al Payne, Sterfon Demings; Grace and Frankie – Kelly Kline, Jonathan Hanousek, Marlene Williams; Ozark – Rita Parillo, Anna Hilton, Tanya Walker; RuPaul's Drag Race – Curtis Foreman, Ryan Randall
Best Period and/or Character Make-Up	Best Period and/or Character Hair Styling
The Queen's Gambit – Daniel Parker; Bridgerton – Marc Pilcher, Lynda J. Pearce, Claire Matthews, Louise Bannell; The Crown – Cate Hall, Emilie Yong-Mills; Hollywood – Eryn Krueger Mekash, Kim Ayers, Kerrin Jackson, Ana Gabriela Quinonez; The Mandalorian – Brian Sipe, Alexei Dmitriew, Samantha Ward, Carlton Coleman; Perry Mason – Christien Tinsley, Corinne Foster, Steve Costanza, Gerry Quist	Bridgerton – Marc Pilcher, Lynda J. Pearce, Adam James Phillips, Tania Couper; The Crown – Cate Hall, Emilie Yong-Mills; Hollywood – Michelle Ceglia, Barry Lee Moe, George Guzman, Michele Arvizo; The Queen's Gambit – Daniel Parker; Ratched – Chris Clark, Natalie Driscoll, Michelle Ceglia, Dawn Victoria Dudley
Best Special Make-Up Effects
The Mandalorian – Brian Sipe, Alexei Dmitriew, Samantha Ward, Scott Stoddard; Hollywood – Eryn Krueger Mekash, Kerrin Jackson, Ana Gabriela Quinonez; Lovecraft Country – Carey Jones, Heather Beauvais; Star Trek: Picard – James MacKinnon, Richard Redlefsen, Alexei Dmitriew, Vincent Van Dyke; Westworld – Justin Raleigh, Chris Hampton, Thom Floutz

=== Television Special, One Hour or More Live Program Series or Movie for Television ===
Best Contemporary Make-Up	Best Contemporary Hair Styling
Saturday Night Live – Louie Zakarian, Amy Tagliamonti, Jason Milani, Joanna Pisani; Dancing with the Stars – Zena S. Green, Julie Socash, Donna Bard, Victor Del Castillo; Killing Eve (Season 3) – Juliette Tomes, Amy Brand; Mariah Carey's Magical Christmas Special – Bruce Grayson, Angela Moos, Kristofer Buckle, James MacKinnon; The Oscars – Bruce Grayson, Angela Moos, Jennifer Aspinall, James MacKinnon	Dancing with the Stars – Kimi Messina, Jani Kleinbard, Regina Rodriquez, Roma Goddard; Euphoria (for "Trouble Don’t Last Always") – Melanie Smith, Kaity Licina; Mariah Carey's Magical Christmas Special – Jayson Medina, Abraham Esparza, Nicole Walpert, Brian Steven Banks; Saturday Night Live (for "Host: Adele") – Jodi Mancuso, Cara Hannah, Inga Thrasher; The Voice – Jerilynn Stephens, Danilo Dixon, Roberto Ramos, Robert “LaMarr” Randall
Best Period and/or Character Make-Up	Best Period Hair Styling and/or Character Hair Styling
Saturday Night Live – Louie Zakarian, Amy Tagliamonti, Jason Milani, Rachel Pagani; The Clark Sisters: First Ladies of Gospel – LaLette Littlejohn, Christopher Pizzarelli, Dorota Zajac; Sherman's Showcase Black History Month Spectacular – Rebecca DeHerrera, Pam Farmer, Rebecca Lee Castro, Karen Knopp; Sylvie's Love – Angela Wells, Angel Radefeld-Wright, Brigitte Hennech; Uncle Frank – Lindsay Irish Desarno, Diane Heller	Hamilton – Frederick Waggoner; The Clark Sisters: First Ladies of Gospel – Etheline Joseph, Yasmine Crosdale, Tenika Smith; Godmothered – Melissa Yonkey, Susan Buffington, Marie Larkin; Saturday Night Live (for "Host: Kristen Wiig") – Jodi Mancuso, Cara Hannah, Inga Thrasher; Sylvie's Love – Carla Joi Farmer, Linda Villalobos, Lillie Frierson, Stacey Morris

=== Daytime Television ===
Best Make-Up	Best Hair Styling
The Kelly Clarkson Show – Jason McGlothin, Gloria Elias-Foeillet, Chanty LaGrana, John Foster; The Bold and the Beautiful – Christine Lai Johnson, Stacey Alfano, James Elle; The Ellen DeGeneres Show – Dionne Wynn; The Real – Melanie Mills, Glen Alen Gutierrez, Motoko Honjo-Clayton; The Young and the Restless – Patricia Denney, Kathy Jones, Laura Schaffer, Kelsey Collins	The Kelly Clarkson Show – Roberto Ramos, Tara Copeland; The Bold and the Beautiful – Lisa Long, Danielle Spencer, Lauren Larsen, Christina Joseph; The Young and the Restless – Adriana Lucio, Lauren Mendoza, Regina Rodriquez. Jackie Zavala; The Real – Roberta Gardener-Rogers, Rachel Mason, Ray Dobson, Noogie Thai; Dr. Phil (for "From Tech Genius to Unmotivated Mess") – Mimi Vodnoy Love, Annette Jones

=== Children and Teen Television Programming ===
Best Make-Up	Best Hair Styling
All That – Michael Johnston, Melanie Mills, Tyson Fountaine, Nadege Schoenfeld; The Baby-Sitters Club – Zabrina Matiru, Darah Wyant, Lindsey Pilkey; Danger Force – Michael Johnston, Brad Look, Kevin Westmore, Tyson Fountaine; Henry Danger – Michael Johnston, Brad Look, Kevin Westmore, Robert Maverick; Sesame Street – Jane DiPersio	All That – Joe Matke, Dwayne Ross, Theresa Broadnax; The Baby-Sitters Club – Florence Cepeda, Sasha Carnovale, Danger Force – Joe Matke, Roma Goddard, Yunea Cruz; Ghostwriter – Liz Roelands; Sesame Street – Jacqueline Payne

=== Commercials and Music Videos ===
Best Make-Up	Best Hair Styling
Lady Gaga "911" – Sarah Tanno, Mike Mekash, Eryn Krueger Mekash; Bud Light Super Bowl LV "Post Malone" – Linda Barcojo, Kentaro Yano; Capitol One "John Travolta Santa/Hungry Man" – Michael Ornelaz, Richard RedlefsenJ; Justin Bieber "Anyone" – Julie Hassett, Ally McGillicuddy, Kevin Haney, VyVy Tran; The Weeknd "In Your Eyes" – Koji Ohmura, Shelby Smith	Workout/State Farm "Chris Paul and Alfonso Ribeiro" – Stacey Morris; Frito-Lay "My Favorite Things" – Craig Gangi; Mountain Dew Zero "Bryan Cranston" – Vitto Trotta; Rufus Wainwright "Devils and Angels" – Sean James; Ozzy Osbourne "Under the Graveyard" – Melissa Yonkey, Troy Zestos

=== Theatrical Productions (Live Stage) ===
Best Hair Styling
- Hamilton (And Peggy Company) – Marcelo Donari, Robert Mrazik
  - Frozen - Live at the Hyperion – Erin Zachary
  - Frozen – Suzanne Storey, Elaine Jarblanski, Chanthy Orellana
  - Harry Potter and the Cursed Child – Vicky Martinez, Sophia Robinson, Jason Torres
  - Little Shop of Horrors – Sharon Peng, Jenny Maureen
