= Make-Up Artists & Hair Stylists Guild Awards 2025 =

2025 awards for make-up and hair in TV and film

- Date: February 14, 2026
- Site: Westin Bonaventure Hotel, Los Angeles, California

Highlights
- Most nominations: Film: One Battle After Another, Frankenstein, Sinners, Weapons, Wicked: For Good (3); Television: Dancing with the Stars (4)

The 18th Make-Up Artists & Hair Stylists Guild Awards, presented by L'Oréal Groupe and Giovanni Eco Chic Beauty, honored outstanding achievements for both make-up and hair stylists in motion pictures, television, commercials and live theater for 2025 on February 14, 2026, at Westin Bonaventure Hotel in Los Angeles.

Nominations were announced on December 29, 2025. In the film categories, One Battle After Another, Frankenstein, Sinners, Weapons, and Wicked: For Good, led with three nominations each. In the television categories, Dancing with the Stars led with four nominations, followed by Monster: The Ed Gein Story, Stranger Things, Wednesday, and Saturday Night Live, all with three each.

== Winners and nominees ==
The winners will listed first and in bold.

=== Feature-Length Motion Picture ===
Best Contemporary Make-Up	Best Contemporary Hair Styling
**One Battle After Another – Heba Thorisdottir, Mandy Artusato**; Bugonia – Torsten Witte; Eddington – Colin Penman, Lisa Hansell; Jurassic World Rebirth – Jana Carboni, Charlie Hounslow, Nik Buck, Aisling Nairn, Lauren Baldwin; Superman – Alexei Dmitriew, LuAndra Whitehurst, Nicole Sortillon Amos, Amanda Sprunger	**One Battle After Another – Ahou Mofid, Gina Maria DeAngelis, Sacha Quarles**; Ballad of a Small Player – Heike Merker, Alex Kwan; Bugonia – Torsten Witte; The Naked Gun – Joyce M. Gilliard, Nadia Sobh, Tomica Sarver; Superman – Peter Swords King, Lindsay McAllister, Magnolia Lowe
Best Period and/or Character Make-Up	Best Period Hair Styling and/or Character Hair Styling
**Sinners – Ken Diaz, Siân Richards, Ned Neidhardt, Allison laCour, Lana Mora**; Frankenstein – Jordan Samuel, Oriana Rossi, Kristin Wayne, Patricia Keighran, Lizzi Lawson Zeiss; The Smashing Machine – Felix Fox, Darah Wyant, Amanda Imeson, Harlow MacFarlane, Maiko Gomyo; Weapons – Leo Satkovich, Mark Ross, Jason Collins, Kaylee Kehne-Swisher, Brie Bastianson; Wicked: For Good – Frances Hannon, Alice Jones, Nuria Mbomio, Sarah Nuth	**Sinners – Shunika Terry-Jennings, Elizabeth Robinson, Tene Wilder, Jove Edmond, Sherri B. Hamilton**; Frankenstein – Cliona Furey, Tim Nolan, Laura Solari, Tori Binns, Katarina Chovanec; Marty Supreme – Kay Georgiou, Jimmy Goode, Michael Buonincontro, Mitchell Beck; Weapons – Melizah Wheat, Monty Schuth, Nashi Tumlinson; Wicked: For Good – Frances Hannon, Sim Camps, Gabor Kerekes, Laura Blount
Best Special Make-Up Effects
**Frankenstein – Mike Hill, Megan Many**; One Battle After Another – Arjen Tuiten, Jessica Nelson; Sinners – Mike Fontaine, Bailey Domke, Kelsey Berk, Kevin Wasner, Cristina Patterson; Weapons – Jason Collins, Leo Satkovich, Mike McCarty, Mark Ross, Kaylee Kehne-Swisher; Wicked: For Good – Frances Hannon, Mark Coulier, Stephen Murphy, Susie Redfern

=== Television Series – Limited, Miniseries, or Movie for Television ===
Best Contemporary Make-Up	Best Contemporary Hair Styling
**The Studio – Jorjee Douglass, Gillian Whitlock, Robin Glaser, Cassie Lyons, James Freitas (Apple TV+)**; Abbott Elementary – Constance Foe, Jenn Bennett, Carla Rosso-Neal, Brandy Allen, Nick Fischer (ABC / Hulu); All's Fair – Tierra Richards, Victor Del Castillo, Chloe Sens, Naima Jamal, Diana Shin (Hulu); Emily in Paris – Aurélie Payen, Sarah Damen, Fred Marin, Fanny Maurer, Carole Nicolas (Netflix); I Love LA – Michelle Chung, Erin Rosenmann, Afton Storton (HBO Max); The White Lotus – Rebecca Hickey, Michelle Kearns, Vicky Nugent, Wattana Garum (HBO Max)	**The Studio – Vanessa Price, Alexandra Ford, Lauren McKeever (Apple TV+)**; Abbott Elementary – Moira Frazier, Dustin Osborne, Christina Joseph, Charlotte Noon (ABC / Hulu); All's Fair – Valerie Jackson, Marisa Pinuelas, Suzette Boozer, Linda Flowers, Sharif Poston (Hulu); Emily in Paris – Carole Nicolas, Mike Desir, Miharu Oshima, Jay Durimel, Julien Parizet (Netflix); Nobody Wants This – Lauren Poole, Patrick Lising, Stephanie Rives (Netflix)
Best Period and/or Character Make-Up	Best Period and/or Character Hair Styling
**Palm Royale – Tricia Sawyer, Marissa Lafayette, Marie DelPrete, Rory Gaudio, Alyssa Goldberg (Apple TV+)**; Chief of War – Christien David Tinsley, Hugo Villasenor, Bianca Appice, Carlton Coleman (Apple TV+); Monster: The Ed Gein Story – Corey Castellano, Heather Koontz (Netflix); Stranger Things – Eryn Krueger Mekash, Devin Morales, Mike Mekash, Jessica Gambardella, Benji Dove (Netflix); Wednesday – Lynn Johnston, Elaine Hopkins, Dorothy Campbell, Helen Bailey, Nirvana Jalalvand (Netflix)	**Palm Royale – Karen Bartek, Brittany Madrigal, Tiffany Bloom, Anna Quinn, Jill Crosby (Apple TV+)**; Chief of War – Analyn Cruz, Ralph Malani, Raquel Bianchini, Vanya Pell, Kathrine Sanchez (Apple TV+); Monster: The Ed Gein Story – Barry Lee Moe, Erica Adams, George Guzman, Michele Arvizo, Randy Wilder (Netflix); Stranger Things – Sarah Hindsgaul, Katrina Suhre, Brynn Berg, Dena Gibson, Lanzel Smith Jr. (Netflix); Wednesday – Francesco Pegoretti, Nirvana Jalalvand (Netflix)
Best Special Make-Up Effects
**Stranger Things – Barrie Gower, Mike Mekash, Duncan Jarman (Netflix)**; The Last of Us – Barrie Gower, Mike Mekash, Duncan Jarman (HBO Max); Monster: The Ed Gein Story – Corey Castellano, Mark Nieman, David Leroy Anderson, David Snyder (Netflix); Star Trek: Section 31 – Glenn Hetrick, Rocky Faulkner, Michele Hetrick, Nicola Bendrey (Paramount+); Wednesday – Tristan Versluis, Matthew Smith (Netflix)

=== Television Special, One Hour or More Live Program Series ===
Best Contemporary Make-Up	Best Contemporary Hair Styling
**Saturday Night Live – Louie Zakarian, Amy Tagliamonti, Jason Milani, Young Bek, Madison Bermudez (NBC)**; A Nonsense Christmas with Sabrina Carpenter – Diana Oh, Vanessa Dionne, Alicia Carbajal, Carolina Gonzalez, Ashley Joy Beck (Netflix); Dancing with the Stars – Zena Green, Angela Moos, Alison Gladieux, Farah Bunch, Sarah Benjamin Hall (ABC); The Voice – Darcy Gilmore, Marylin Lee Spiegel, Gina Ghiglieri, Kristene Bernard, Kristina Frisch (NBC); Wicked: One Wonderful Night – Bruce Grayson, Brielle McKenna, Levi Vieira, Sean Conklin (NBC)	**Dancing with the Stars – Marion Rogers, Brittany Spaulding, Amber Nicholle Maher, Florence Witherspoon, Regina Rodriguez (ABC)**; American Idol – Dean Banowetz, Amber Nicholle Maher, Cory Rotenberg, Kathleen Leonard, Jerilynn Stephens (ABC); The Jennifer Hudson Show – Robear Landeros, Albert Morrison (Syndicated); The Kelly Clarkson Show – Corey Morris, Kerry Joly, Brittany Hartman, Korynn Gonzales-Novotny (NBC); The Voice – Jerilynn Stephens, Darbie Wieczorek, Bia Iftikhar, Candi Russell, Kathleen Leonard (NBC)
Best Period and/or Character Make-Up	Best Period Hair Styling and/or Character Hair Styling
**Saturday Night Live – Louie Zakarian, Jason Milani, Amy Tagliamonti, Joanna Pisani, Kim Webe (NBC)**; Dancing with the Stars – Brian Sipe, Julie Socash, John Foster, Vance Hartwell, Donna Bard (ABC); Everybody's Live with John Mulaney – Tonia Green, Tyson Fountaine, Jude Alcala, Gage Munster, Sean Conklin (Netflix); Jimmy Kimmel Live – Stephanie A. Fowler, Cindy Miguens (ABC); The Lion King at the Hollywood Bowl – Bruce Grayson, Brielle McKenna, Jill Cady, Tyson Fountaine, Ashley Roller (Disney+)	**Saturday Night Live 50th Anniversary Special – Jodi Mancuso, Cara Hannah, Amanda Duffy Evans, Gina Ferrucci, Brittany Hartman (NBC)**; Dancing with the Stars – Marion Rogers, Brittany Spaulding, Amber Nicholle Maher, Florence Witherspoon, Regina Rodriguez (ABC); Everybody's Live with John Mulaney – Dean Banowetz, LaLisa Turner, Cory Rotenberg, Cassie Russek, Amber Nicholle Maher (Netflix); Saturday Night Live – Jodi Mancuso, Cara Hannah, Inga Thrasher, Chad Harlow, Katie Beatty (NBC); Wicked: One Wonderful Night – Edward Morrison, Lillie Frierson-King, Tiffany Bloom, R'riyana Kline (NBC)

=== Children and Teen Television Programming ===
Best Make-Up	Best Hair Styling
**Star Wars: Skeleton Crew – Samantha Ward, Sonia Cabrera, Cristina Waltz, Alexei Dmitriew, Adina Sullivan (Disney+)**; Goosebumps: The Vanishing – Tisa Howard, Emilio Ayinde Castro, Susan Reilly Lehane, Jeremy Selenfriend, Brian Spears (Disney+); Percy Jackson and the Olympians – Naomi Bakstad, Krista Seller, Ashley Forshaw, Megan Harkness (Disney+); Wizards Beyond Waverly Place – Melissa Sandora, Sarah Benjamin-Hall, Koji Ohmura (Disney Channel); Zombies 4: Dawn of the Vampires – Susie Glass, Cora Montalban, Claire Wollburg, Jessica Hunt (Disney Channel)	**Star Wars: Skeleton Crew – Lane Friedman, Nanxy Tong-Heater, Richard DeAlba, Roxane Griffin (Disney+)**; Electric Bloom – Brenda Blatt, Melanie Verkins, Melanie Ervin (Disney Channel); Goosebumps: The Vanishing – Joshua First, Jenny Pendergraft, Lisa Thomas (Disney+); Percy Jackson and the Olympians – Jeannie Chow, Jessica Glyn-Jones, Amanda Dawn Mitchell, Jindje Renz, Alysha McLoughlin (Disney+); Wizards Beyond Waverly Place – Dwayne Ross, Tamara Tripp (Disney Channel)

=== Commercials and Music Videos ===
Best Make-Up	Best Hair Styling
**Lady Gaga: "Abracadabra" – Sarah Tanno, Phuong Tran (YouTube)**; Ariana Grande: "Eternal Sunshine" – Justin Raleigh, Ozzy Alvarez, Liz Mendoza Kellogg, Olga Tarnovetska, Michael Anthony (YouTube); BUBBA Burger: "Unbelievable" – Christopher Osorio, Rocco Gaglioti (Hulu); Six Flags 2025 Haunt: "Come Out and Play" – Hugo Villasenor, Roxanne Pike, Heather Galipo, John Wrightson (Internet); Walmart: "WhoKnewVille Top Brands" – Rachel Hoke, Jennifer Hanching, Erin Walters, Jessie Bishop (YouTube)	**Walmart: "WhoKnewVille Holiday Campaign" – Dean Banowetz, Amber Nicholle Maher, Johnny Lomeli, Maria Sandoval, Myo La (Multiple platforms)**; Amazon Prime: "Amazon Prime Day featuring LeBron James" – Dominie Till, Akiko Matsumoto, Tranell DaMarr Ward, Christien Tinsley (Multiple platforms); Chapter III: PVP Time – Andrii Tkach, Tiphanie Baum, D'nelle Almanza (YouTube); Discover x Stranger Things – Sarah Hindsgaul, Cassie Russek, Ashley Jensen, Lyndsey J. Scott (Netflix/Fox Sports); Tyson: "Royal Jewels" – Kimberly Carlson, Isata Allen, Ian Joseph (Multiple platforms)

=== Theatrical Productions (Live Stage) ===
California Regional: Best Make-Up and Hair Styling	Broadway and International: Best Make-Up and Hair Styling
**The Monkey King – Jeanna Parham, Christina Martin, Erin Hennessy, Maur Sela (San Francisco Opera)**; Ainadamar – Samantha Wiener, Maggie Jean Clark, Brandi Strona, Nathalie Eidt, Nicole Rodrigues (LA Opera); Jaja's African Hair Braiding – Therese LeVasseur, April Tillies, Latoya Patton (Mark Taper Forum); Rigoletto – Samantha Wiener, Maggie Jean Clark, Brandi Strona, Nathalie Eidt, Jaclyn Nocerino (LA Opera); West Side Story – Maggie Jean Clark, Kelso Millett, Brandi Strona, Delaney Doherty, Nicole Rodrigues (LA Opera)	**Frankenstein – Lisa Ruth Zomer, Thomas Richards-Keyes, Timothy Santry (Segerstrom Center for the Arts)**; Bat Boy: The Musical – Madison McLain, Bri Trischitta (New York City Center); Beetlejuice – Ryan Jackson, Pat Marcus (Palace Theatre, NYC); Death Becomes Her – Mark Bailey Capalbo, Kelli Lennox, Raphael A. Santos, Colleen Syiek, Jakob Robson (The Lunt-Fontanne Theatre); TINA – The Tina Turner Musical – Dimonica Carter, Kellen Eason, Liz Printz, Danielle Singletary (International Tour)

=== Honorary Awards ===
- Vanguard Award – Michael Johnston
- Distinguished Artisan Award – Amy Madigan
- Lifetime Achievement Award – Greg Nelson and Judith A. Cory
