= Make-Up Artists & Hair Stylists Guild Awards 2021 =

Entertainment award

- Date: February 19, 2022
- Site: The Beverly Hilton, California

The 14th Make-Up Artists and Hair Stylists Guild Awards are presented by the Make-Up Artists and Hair Stylists Guild to honor the best make-up and hairstyling in film and television for 2021, the winners were announced on February 19, 2022, at the Beverly Hilton Hotel. Make-up artist Michèle Burke and hairstylist Joy Zapata received the Lifetime Achievement Award.

The nominations were announced on January 11, 2022.

== Winners and nominees ==
The winners are listed first and in bold.

=== Feature-Length Motion Picture ===
| Best Contemporary Make-Up | Best Contemporary Hair Styling |
|---|---|
| **Coming 2 America – Merc Arceneaux, Vera Steimberg, Trent Simmons, Caroline Monge**; Black Widow – Paul Gooch, Paula Price, Deborah LaMia Denaver; Don't Look Up – Liz Bernstrom, Julie LeShane, Claudia Moriel, Joseph Dulude ll; No Time to Die – Daniel Phillips; The Suicide Squad – Heba Thorisdottir, Greg Funk, Sabrina Wilson, Jillian Erickson | **Coming 2 America – Stacey Morris, Carla Farmer, Louisa Anthony, Victor Paz**; In The Heights – Betsy Reyes, Valerie Velez, Annemarie Bradley-Sherron, Diedre Harris; No Time to Die – Daniel Phillips; The Matrix Resurrections – Flora Moody, Shunika Terry, Kerrie Smith; The Suicide Squad – Janine Rath-Thompson, Michelle Diamantides, Melizah Wheat, Kristen Saia |
| Best Period and/or Character Make-Up | Best Period Hair Styling and/or Character Hair Styling |
| **Cruella – Nadia Stacey, Naomi Donne, Guy Common**; Being the Ricardos – Ana Lozano, David Craig Forrest, Kyra Panchenko, Denise Paulson; Dune – Donald Mowat, Jo-Ann MacNeil, Rocky Faulkner, Jennifer Stanfield; House of Gucci – Jana Carboni, Sarah Tanno, Daniel Lawson Johnston, Stefania Pellegini; The Eyes of Tammy Faye – Linda Dowds, Ashleigh Chavis-Wolfe, Renee Goodwin | **Being the Ricardos – Teressa Hill, Yvonne De Patis-Kupka Lindy Dunn, Kim Santantonio**; Cruella – Nadia Stacey, Naomi Donne, Julia Vernon; House of Gucci – Giuliano Mariano, Frederic Aspiras, Alexis Continente, Anna Carin Lock; The Eyes of Tammy Faye – Stephanie Ingram, Betty Lou Skinner, Heather Hawkins, Bryson Conley; West Side Story – Kay Georgiou, Jerry DeCarlo |
Best Special Effects Make-Up
**Coming 2 America – Mike Marino, Michael Fontaine, Yoichi Art Sakamoto, Diana Choi**; Dune – Donald Mowat, Love Larson, Eva von Bahr, Rocky Faulkner; House of Gucci – Göran Lundström, Federica Castelli; The Eyes of Tammy Faye – Justin Raleigh, Kelly Golden, Chris Hampton, Thom Floutz; The Suicide Squad – Shane Mahan, Brian Sipe, Matt Sprunger, Greg Funk

=== Television Series, Limited or Miniseries or Television New Media Series ===
| Best Contemporary Make-Up | Best Contemporary Hair Styling |
|---|---|
| **American Horror Stories – Tyson Fountaine, Melissa Buell, Ron Pipes, Gage Munster**; Emily in Paris – Odile Fourquin, Aurélie Payen, Carole Nicolas, Corinne Maillard; Mare of Easttown – Debi Young, Ngozi Olandu Young, Sandra Linn, Rachel Geary; RuPaul's Drag Race – David Petruschin, Jen Fregozo, Nicole Faulkner; WandaVision – Tricia Sawyer, Vasilios Tanis | **Emily in Paris – Odile Fourquin, Mike Desir, Carole Nicolas, Frederic Souquet**; Black-ish – Nena Ross-Davis, Stacey Morris, Lionel Brown, Marcia Hamilton; Grace and Frankie – Kelly Kline, Jonathan Hanousek, Marlene Williams; Mare of Easttown – Lawrence Davis, Shunika Terry, Lydia Benaim, Ivana Primorac; RuPaul's Drag Race – Curtis Foreman, Ryan Randall |
| Best Period and/or Character Make-Up | Best Period and/or Character Hair Styling |
| **Pose – Sherri Berman Laurence, Nicky Pattison Illum, Charles Zambrano, Jai Williams**; Halston – Patricia Regan, Claus Lulla, Margot Boccia, Joseph A. Campayno; Impeachment: American Crime Story – Robin Beauchesne, KarrieAnne Heisner Sillay, Angela Moos, Erin LaBre; This is Us – Zoe Hay, Heather Plott, Tania McComas; WandaVision – Tricia Sawyer, Vasilios Tanis, Regina Little, Jonah Levy | **Genius: Aretha – Louisa V. Anthony, Tracey Moss, Victor Paz**; Halston – Michelle Johnson, JT Franchuk, Christen Edwards; Impeachment: American Crime Story – Natalie Driscoll, Michelle Ceglia; Pose – Barry Lee Moe, Timothy Harvey, Tene Wilder, Greg Bazemore; WandaVision – Karen Bartek, Cindy Welles, Nikki Wright, Anna Quinn |
Best Special Make-Up Effects
**Star Trek: Discovery – Glenn Hetrick, Rocky Faulkner, Nicola Bendrey, Chris Burgoyne**; American Horror Stories – Jason Hamer, Cale Thomas, Hiroshi Yada, Cary Ayers; Impeachment: American Crime Story – Justin Raleigh, Kelly Golden, Chris Hampton, Thom Floutz; The Witcher – Barrie Gower, Deb Watson; This Is Us – Zoe Hay, Stevie Bettles, Tania McComas, Elizabeth Hoel Chang

=== Television Special, One Hour or More Live Program Series or Movie for Television ===
| Best Contemporary Make-Up | Best Contemporary Hair Styling |
|---|---|
| **Saturday Night Live – Louie Zakarian, Amy Tagliamonti, Jason Milani, Rachel Paganii**; Dancing with the Stars – Julie Socash, Alison Gladieux, Donna Bard, Barbi Fonte; Legendary – Tonia Nichole Green, Tyson Fountaine, Glen Alen, Valente Frazier; Muppets Haunted Mansion – Elle Favorule, Sonia Cabrera, Michelle Sfarzo; The Voice – Darcy Gilmore, Ashlyn McIntyre, Gloria Elias-Foeillet, Ashley Holm | **Dancing with the Stars – Jani Kleinbard, Gail Ryan, Cheryl Eckert, Regina Rodriquez**; Kelly Clarkson Presents: When Christmas Comes Around – Tara Copeland, Robert Ramos; Legendary – Jerilynn Stephens, Kimi Messina, Kathleen Leonard, Dean Banowetz; Nicole Byer: BBW (Big Beautiful Weirdo) – Moira Frazier; The Voice – Jerilynn Stephens, Darbie Wieczorek, Roberto Ramos, Josh Liu |
| Best Period and/or Character Make-Up | Best Period Hair Styling and/or Character Hair Styling |
| **Saturday Night Live – Louie Zakarian, Amy Tagliamonti, Jason Milani, Joanna Pisani**; Legendary – Tonia Green, Tyson Fountaine, Silvia Leczel, Jennifer Fregozo; Oslo – Daniel Parker; Robin Roberts Presents: Mahalia – Krista Hann, Kieran Wang, Geeta Dayal; We're Here – Tyler Devlin, Martin DeLuna, Jeremy Austin | **Legendary – Jerilynn Stephens, Kimi Messina, Kathleen Leonard, Dean Banowetz**; Dancing with the Stars – Brittany Spaulding, Tiphanie Baum, Patricia Pineda, Arrick Anderson; Harry Potter: Hogwarts Tournament of Houses – Troy Zestos, Johnny Lomeli; Respect – Lawrence Davis; We're Here – Abdiel Urcullu, Tyler Funicelli |
Best Special Make-Up Effects
**Saturday Night Live – Louie Zakarian, Jason Milani, Tom Denier Jr., Lisa Forst**; Dancing with the Stars – Brian Sipe, Julie Socash, Vance Hartwell, Kato DeStefan; Fear Street Part Three: 1666 – Christopher Nelson, LuAndra Whitehurst, Mark Ross; Legendary – Tonia Nichole Green, Tyson Fountaine, Sean Conklin, Marcel Banks

=== Daytime Television ===
| Best Make-Up | Best Hair Styling |
|---|---|
| **The Kelly Clarkson Show – Chanty LaGrana, Valente Fraizer, Gloria Elias-Foeillet**; The Bold and the Beautiful – Christine Lai Johnson, James Elle, Hajja Barnes; The Young and the Restless – Patricia Denney, Kathy Jones, Robert Bolger, Stacey Alfano | **The Kelly Clarkson Show – Roberto Ramos, Tara Copeland**; Dr. Phil – Mimi Vodnoy Love, Annette Jones; The Bold and the Beautiful – Lisa Long, Danielle Spencer, Lauren Salas, Stephanie Paugh; The Young and the Restless – Lauren Mendoza, Justin Jackson, Miriam Flowers, Michelle Corona |

=== Children and Teen Television Programming ===
| Best Make-Up | Best Hair Styling |
|---|---|
| **Danger Force – Michael Johnston, Brad Look, Kevin Westmore, Tyson Fountaine**; Family Reunion – Kym Nicole Oubre, Starlynn Burden, Julianne Kaye; Head of the Class – Linda Choi, Alexis Walker, Olivia Fischa, Joely Upchurch Gonez; Sesame Street – Jane DiPersio, Chris Bingham; The Baby-Sitters Club – Ceilidh Dunn, Ciara Lynch, Ashley Pilkey | **Danger Force – Joe Matke, Roma Goddard, Yunea Cruz**; Family Reunion – Melanie Ervin, Lindsay Rogers; Head of the Class – Patricia Pineda, Rachel Bench, Dwayne Ross; Sesame Street – Rob Greene; The Baby-Sitters Club – Florencia Cepeda, Miranda Upton, Alana Olson |

=== Commercials and Music Videos ===
| Best Make-Up | Best Hair Styling |
|---|---|
| **American Horror Story: Double Feature – Kerry Herta, Christina Kortum, Alex Perrone**; "Edgar Scissorhands Cadillac Super Bowl" – Cale Thomas, Alan Scott, Ashley Scott, Stephen Sollitto; Pink: All I Know So Far – Barney Burman, Bart Mixon, Chloe Sens; "Rapunzel Doesn't Need a Prince" – Dominie Till, Gunn Espegard, Katy Mc Clintock; "Star Wars Galactic Starcruiser Hotel" – Brian Sipe, Samantha Ward | **Pose – Joe Matke, Genyii Scott**; Dom Pérignon – Frederic Aspiras; Mercedes-Benz Winter Event – Dominie Till, Vito Trotta; "Rapunzel Doesn't Need a Prince" – Dominie Till, Katy McClintock, Anne Juliette; Taco Bell – “Talk Show Dreams” featuring Lil Nas X – Stacey Morris, Dominique Evans; Uber Eats Commercial – Cheryl Marks, Allyson Joyner, Stella Tzanidankis |

=== Theatrical Productions (Live Stage) ===
| Best Make-Up | Best Hair Styling |
|---|---|
| **Cinderella (La Cenerentola) – Raquel Bianchini, Brandi Strona, Danielle Richter**; Horror Camp: A Musical Massacre – Michael Johnston, Tyson Fountaine, Julie Socash, Sean Conklin; Il Trovatore – Raquel Bianchini, Brandi Strona, Sarah Wagner, Morgan Sellers | **Cinderella (La Cenerentola) – Raquel Bianchini, Danielle Richter, Marylou Hernandez**; Hamilton (And Peggy Company) – Marcelo Donari, Brandon Bolton, Melissa Dawson, Charles LaPoint; Head Over Heels – Christopher Enlow, Jenni Gilbert; Horror Camp: A Musical Massacre – Michael Johnston, Jennifer Green, Nicole Goulet, Kelcey Dibernardo; Tannhäuser LA Opera – Raquel Bianchini, Danielle Richter, Brandi Stona, Nicole Rodrigues |
