= Yaya DaCosta =

American actress and model (born 1982)

- Born: November 15, 1982 (age 43); New York City, U.S.
- Education: Brown University
- Years active: 2004–present
- Children: 1
- Modeling information
- Height: 5 ft 8 in (1.73 m)
- Hair color: Black
- Eye color: Brown
- Agency: Ford Models

Yaya DaCosta (born November 15, 1982) is an American actress and model. She was the runner-up in Cycle 3 of America's Next Top Model. DaCosta eventually appeared in ABC's daytime drama series All My Children (2008), ABC's comedy-drama Ugly Betty (2009), and NBC's medical drama Chicago Med (2015–2022).

In 2010, she appeared in the film The Kids Are All Right, being nominated with the cast at the Critics' Choice Movie Award and at the Gotham Award. DaCosta starred in the Lifetime television film Whitney (2015) as singer Whitney Houston. She received praise for her performance and was nominated for the Black Reel Award for Outstanding Actress, TV Movie or Limited Series.

== Early life and education ==
DaCosta was born on November 15, 1982. She was raised in the Harlem neighborhood of New York City. She is of African-American and Brazilian descent. In addition to English, she speaks Portuguese. She attended Northfield Mount Hermon School during high school before attending Brown University, where she majored in Africana studies and international relations.

== Career ==
After being the runner-up on Cycle 3 of America's Next Top Model, DaCosta went on to have a successful career. DaCosta appeared once in the bottom two during the competition. She appeared on the cover of Hype Hair. In 2014, she landed a spot in Tom Ford’s Fall/Winter advertising campaign. DaCosta began acting in 2005 after guest-starring in an episode of the UPN sitcom Eve. She appeared in the 2006 dance film Take the Lead. DaCosta had supporting roles in the independent films Honeydripper (2007) and The Messenger (2009).

She appeared in the ABC soap opera All My Children in 2008 as Cassandra Foster. According to an interview with All My Children's new head writer, Charles Pratt, Jr., DaCosta left the role some time in August 2008, less than four months after joining the show, to join the cast of The First Breeze of Summer on Broadway. The First Breeze of Summer was presented from 2008 to 2009 by the Negro Ensemble Company. In 2009, she had a recurring role as Nico Slater in the fourth and final season of the ABC comedy-drama series Ugly Betty.

In 2010, DaCosta had supporting roles in the comedy-drama film The Kids Are All Right and the science fiction action-adventure film Tron: Legacy. Later, she appeared in magazines, including on the cover of W (September 2010), in L'Officiel (in November 2010), and in Vogue (in January 2011 by Patrick Demarchelier). In 2013, she appeared as Carol in the historical drama film The Butler.

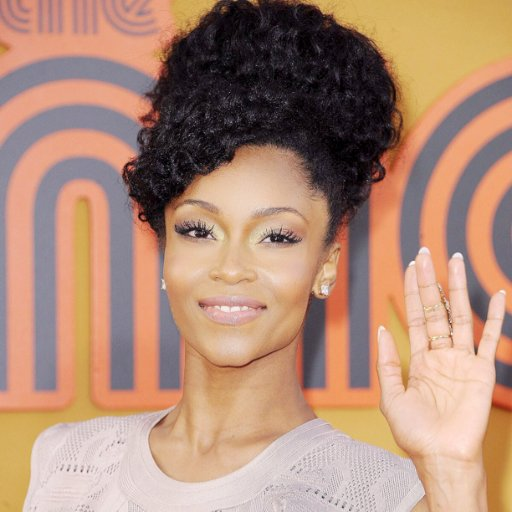
DaCosta in 2016 at the premiere of The Nice Guys

In 2015 DaCosta starred as singer Whitney Houston in a Lifetime television film about her life. DaCosta received praise for her performance.

From 2015 to 2021, DaCosta starred in the NBC medical drama Chicago Med as April Sexton, an ED nurse. On May 14, 2021, DaCosta announced that she was leaving Chicago Med after six seasons, and before her exit she would be joining Fox's drama series Our Kind of People in the lead role; the new series was cancelled after 12 episodes. DaCosta was a recurring character on The Lincoln Lawyer season 2 and then a main character in season 3. She departed the cast ahead of season 4, which began filming in February 2025.

== Personal life ==
DaCosta was in a relationship with independent film producer and director Joshua Bee Alafia from 2012 to 2015. In September 2013, she gave birth to their son, Sankara. In November 2015, it was reported that DaCosta and Alafia broke up. Contrary to popular reports, DaCosta and Alafia were never officially married.

== Filmography ==
=== Film ===
Year	Title	Role	Notes
2006	Take the Lead	LaRhette	
2007	Honeydripper	China Doll	
2009	The Messenger	Monica Washington	
2010	The Kids Are All Right	Tanya	
2010	Tron: Legacy	Siren	
2010	Lost and Found	-	Short film
2011	In Time	Greta	
2011	Whole Lotta Sole	Sophie	
2011	The Shanghai Hotel	Kendra	
2013	Mother of George	Sade	
2013	Big Words	Annie	
2013	The Butler	Carol Hammie	
2014	And So It Goes	Kennedy	
2016	The Nice Guys	Tally	
2019	Peel	Sarah	
2019	Bolden	Nora Bolden	
2025	Not My Family: The Monique Smith Story	Monique Smith	Lifetime movie; also executive producer

=== Television ===
Year	Title	Role	Notes
2004	America's Next Top Model	Cycle 3; Contestant	Runner-up
2005	Eve	Ms. Jenkins	Episode: "Prom Night"
2008	Racing for Time	Vanessa	TV movie
2008	All My Children	Cassandra Foster	Recurring role
2009	Ugly Betty	Nico Slater	Recurring role (season 4)
2009	Law & Order: Special Victims Unit	Audrina	Episode: "Anchor"
2010	Mercy	Brooke Sullivan	Episode: "There Is No Room for You on My Ass"
2010	Army Wives	Specialist Amber Stiles	Episode: "AWOL"
2011	Body of Proof	Holly Bennett	Episode: "Helping Hand"
2011	Weekends at Bellevue	Vanessa	TV movie
2011–2012	House	Anita	2 episodes
2012	Dark Horse	Amy	TV movie
2014	Unforgettable	Molly McGinty	Episode: "Cashing Out"
2015	The Simpsons	Princess Kemi (voice)	Episode: "The Princess Guide"
2015	Whitney	Whitney Houston	TV movie
2015–2021	Chicago Fire	April Sexton	12 episodes, crossover cast
2015–2022	Chicago Med	April Sexton	Main cast (seasons 1–6); Recurring role (season 8)
2017, 2019	Chicago P.D.	April Sexton	3 episodes, crossover cast
2018	Faith Under Fire	Kendra	TV movie
2021–2022	Our Kind of People	Angela Vaughn	Main cast
2023–2024	The Lincoln Lawyer	Andrea "Andy" Freeman	Recurring role (season 2); Main cast (season 3)

=== Music videos ===
Year	Title	Artist
2006	"Pullin' Me Back"	Chingy
2007	"Beautiful Girls"	Sean Kingston
2007	"Roc Boys"	Jay-Z
2011	"Good Man"	Raphael Saadiq

== Awards and nominations ==
Year	Award	Category	Film	Result
2006	Teen Choice Award	Movies – Choice Breakout (Female)	Take the Lead	Nominated
2008	Black Reel Awards	Best Ensemble	Honeydripper	Nominated
2010	Gotham Awards	Best Ensemble Cast	The Kids Are All Right	Nominated
2010	Phoenix Film Critics Society Awards	Best Ensemble Acting	The Kids Are All Right	Nominated
2010	Washington DC Area Film Critics Association Awards	Best Acting Ensemble	The Kids Are All Right	Nominated
2011	Black Reel Award	Best Breakthrough Performance	The Kids Are All Right	Nominated
2011	Critics' Choice Movie Awards	Best Acting Ensemble	The Kids Are All Right	Nominated
2011	Central Ohio Film Critics Association	Best Ensemble	The Kids Are All Right	Nominated
2016	Black Reel Awards	Outstanding Actress, TV Movie or Limited Series	Whitney	Nominated

== See also ==
- List of Afro-Latinos
- List of people from Harlem
