= Make-Up Artists & Hair Stylists Guild Award for Best Special Make-Up Effects in a Television Special, One Hour or More Program, or Movie for Television =

Award for Make-Up Prosthesis in TV and Film

Make-Up Artists and Hair Stylists Guild Award for Best Special Make-Up Effects in Television and New Media Series
- Country: United States
- Presented by: Make-Up Artists and Hair Stylists Guild (MUAHS)
- First award: 2019
- Currently held by: Louie Zakarian, Jason Milani, Tom Denier Jr., Lisa Forst; Saturday Night Live (2021)
- Website: Make-Up Artists & Hair Stylists Guild

The Make-Up Artists and Hair Stylists Guild Award for Best Special Make-Up Effects in a Motion Picture Made for Television or Special is one of the awards given annually to people working in the television industry by the Make-Up Artists and Hair Stylists Guild (MUAHS). It is presented to makeup artists who work in Special Effects makeup, or "Prosthetic makeup", whose work has been deemed "best" in a given year. In previous ceremonies, television films and specials were placed alongside miniseries, but this was changed in 2019, when miniseries nominees were placed alongside continuing series, while television films and specials were given this category.

== Winners and nominees ==
=== 2000s ===
Best Special Makeup Effects – Television (for a Mini-Series/Motion Picture Made for Television)

Year	Program	Nominees	Network
(2000); 2nd
(2000); 2nd	Gepetto	Michael Westmore, Earl Ellis, Mary Kay Morse	ABC
(2000); 2nd	Jackie Bouvier Kennedy Onassis	Leonard Engelman, Nicole Lapierre	CBS
(2000); 2nd	The Corner	Betty Beebe, Jeannee Josefczyk	HBO
(2001); 3rd
(2001); 3rd	She Creature	Myke Michaels, Richard Wetzel, Shane Mahan, Stephanie Coffey	Cinemax
(2001); 3rd	The Day the World Ended	Myke Michaels, Richard Wetzel, Shane Mahan	Cinemax
(2001); 3rd	How to Make a Monster	Myke Michaels, Richard Wetzel, Shane Mahan	Cinemax

Best Special Makeup Effects in a Television Mini-Series or Motion Picture Made for Television

Year	Program	Nominees	Network
(2014); 7th
(2014); 7th	American Horror Story: Freak Show	Eryn Krueger Mekash, Michael Mekash, Christopher Nelson	FX
(2014); 7th	Fargo	Gail Kennedy, David Trainor, Gunther Schetterer	FX
(2014); 7th	Houdini	Gregor Eckstein	History
(2014); 7th	The Knick	Justin Raleigh	Cinemax
(2014); 7th	Olive Kitteridge	Christien Tinsley, Gerald Quist, Hiro Yada	HBO
(2015); 8th
(2015); 8th	American Horror Story: Hotel	Eryn Krueger Mekash, Michael Mekash, David LeRoy Anderson	FX
(2015); 8th	Fargo	Gail Kennedy, David Trainor, Christina Scott	FX
(2015); 8th	Killing Jesus	Clare Ramsey, Jo Grover	Nat Geo
(2015); 8th	Sons of Liberty	Davina Lamont, Simon Rose	History
(2016); 9th
(2016); 9th	American Horror Story: Roanoke	Eryn Krueger Mekash, Michael Mekash, David LeRoy Anderson	FX
(2016); 9th	All the Way	Bill Corso, Andy Clement	HBO
(2016); 9th	The American West	Amy Wadford, Fiona Mifsud	AMC
(2016); 9th	Black Mirror: Men Against Fire	Kristyan Mallett, Tanya Lodge	Netflix
(2016); 9th	Roots	Elvis Jones, Adam Walls, Bailey Domke	History
(2017); 10th
(2017); 10th	American Horror Story: Cult	Eryn Krueger Mekash, Michael Mekash, David LeRoy Anderson	FX
(2017); 10th	Black Mirror: USS Callister	Tanya Lodge	Netflix
(2017); 10th	Fargo	Gail Kennedy, David Trainor, Christina Scott	FX
(2017); 10th	Genius: Einstein	Davina Lamont, Göran Lundström	Nat Geo
(2017); 10th	Twin Peaks	Debbie Zoller, Richard Redlefsen, Jamie Kelman	Showtime

=== 2010s ===
Best Special Make-Up Effects in a Motion Picture Made for Television or Special

Year	Program	Nominees	Network
(2018); 11th
(2018); 11th	Cocaine Godmother	Trefor Proud, Vicki Syskakis	Lifetime
(2018); 11th	Electric Dreams: Crazy Diamond	Kirstin Chalmers, Kristyan Mallett, Satinder Chumber	Amazon Prime Video
(2018); 11th	King Lear	Naomi Donne, Sara Kramer	Amazon Prime Video
(2018); 11th	The Royal Wedding Live with Cord and Tish!	Autumn Butler, Jason Hamer, Vincent Van Dyke	HBO
(2019); 12th
(2019); 12th	Saturday Night Live	Louie Zakarian, Jason Milani, Tom Denier Jr.	NBC
(2019); 12th	2019 MTV Video Music Awards	Angelique Velez, Kyle Krueger	MTV
(2019); 12th	6 Underground	Jana Carboni, Leonardo Cruciano	Netflix
(2019); 12th	Celebrity Big Brother 2	Tyson Fontaine, Brian Penikas, Scott Wheeler	CBS
(2019); 12th	Paddleton	Vyvy Tran	Netflix

=== 2020s ===
Best Special Make-Up Effects in a Television Special, One Hour or More Program, or Movie for Television

Year	Program	Nominees	Network
(2021); 14th
(2021); 14th	Saturday Night Live	Louie Zakarian, Jason Milani, Tom Denier Jr., Lisa Forst	NBC
(2021); 14th	Dancing with the Stars	Brian Sipe, Julie Socash, Vance Hartwell, Kato DeStefan	ABC
(2021); 14th	Fear Street Part Three: 1666	Christopher Nelson, LuAndra Whitehurst, Mark Ross	Netflix
(2021); 14th	Legendary	Tonia Nichole Green, Tyson Fountaine, Sean Conklin, Marcel Banks	HBO Max
(2022); 15th	Beauty and the Beast: A 30th Celebration	Bruce Grayson, James MacKinnon, Alexei Dmitriew, Mo Meinhart	ABC
(2022); 15th	The Guardians of the Galaxy Holiday Special	Alexei Dmitriew, Scott Stoddard, LuAndra Whitehurst, Mo Meinhart	Disney+
(2022); 15th	Dancing with the Stars	Brian Sipe, Julie Socash, Bianca Marie Appice, David Snyder	Disney+
(2022); 15th	Legendary	Tonia Green, Tyson Fountaine, Marcel Banks, Sean Conklin	HBO Max
(2022); 15th	Saturday Night Live	Louie Zakarian, Jason Milani, Tom Denier Jr., Brandon Grether	NBC
