= Whitney (2015 film) =

- Based on: Whitney Houston and Bobby Brown
- Written by: Shem Bitterman
- Directed by: Angela Bassett
- Starring: Yaya DaCosta; Arlen Escarpeta; Yolonda Ross; Suzzanne Douglas
- Theme music composer: RedOne; Wuff; Dan Sundquist; Travon Potts
- Country of origin: United States
- Original language: English

Production
- Producers: Larry Sanitsky; Kyle A. Clark; Lina Wong
- Cinematography: Anastas N. Michos
- Editor: Richard Comeau
- Running time: 88 mins
- Production companies: Sanitsky Company; SilverScreen Pictures

Original release
- Network: Lifetime
- Release: January 17, 2015

Whitney is a 2015 American biographical film directed by Angela Bassett based on American singer Whitney Houston (Yaya DaCosta) and her turbulent marriage to R&B artist Bobby Brown (Arlen Escarpeta) that premiered on Lifetime in North America on January 17, 2015. Whitney received mixed-to-positive reviews from critics, with DaCosta's performance as Houston and Bassett's direction being praised but Escarpeta's casting and the film's accuracy being criticized. Bassett was nominated at the Directors Guild of America Award for Outstanding Directing – Miniseries or TV Film and at the Black Reel Awards for Outstanding Director in a Television Miniseries or Movie.

The movie stars Yaya DaCosta as Houston, Arlen Escarpeta as Brown and Yolonda Ross as Houston's longtime friend and road manager Robyn Crawford. Whitney is set in a period of five years (1989–1994) when Houston was catapulted to worldwide success due to her film debut The Bodyguard and its subsequent soundtrack. Filming lasted 20 days, primarily occurring in Los Angeles and Santa Clarita, California.

Canadian R&B singer Deborah Cox performs all of Houston's vocals in the film, including "I Will Always Love You", "I'm Your Baby Tonight", "I'm Every Woman", "Jesus Loves Me" and "The Greatest Love of All". Additionally, songwriting/production team The Jackie Boyz performed Brown's vocals for "Every Little Step" in the Soul Train Awards scene.

== Plot ==
In 1989, Whitney Houston (Yaya DaCosta) is a worldwide phenomenon and household name with two highly successful self-titled albums under her belt. She attends the 3rd Annual Soul Train Awards with her high school friend and road manager Robyn Crawford (Yolonda Ross), who is a lesbian. During a category in which Houston's name is booed by the audience, she later performs at the ceremony. It is here that she meets fellow R&B singer Bobby Brown and they begin a courtship shortly after, due to her being impressed with Brown's performance of "Every Little Step". In August 1989, Whitney invites Bobby to her lavish 26th birthday celebration, where Bobby discovers her abusing cocaine.

Whitney begins recording her third album I'm Your Baby Tonight (1990), the relationship between her and Brown continues to blossom consistently, leading to a sexual relationship between the two. Unbeknownst to her, Brown is in a relationship with his girlfriend Kim, who had just given birth to his daughter. Just as Houston discovers this, she is left heartbroken and infuriated. Bobby later severs ties with Kim, and Whitney later manages to pull through and persevere in the already hectic relationship. Sometime later, Brown is unable to replicate the success of his album Don't Be Cruel, as his record label wants him to record a greatest hits compilation.

Whitney and Bobby continue to date for a number of years, with Brown proposing to her by late 1991, and the two are married by the summer of 1992. Around this time, Kevin Costner handpicks Houston to star in what will become her film debut The Bodyguard. Though she is initially reluctant, Bobby encourages her to proceed. While on the set of The Bodyguard, Houston suffers a miscarriage, causing her to become very sickly. Cissy visits and persuades Whitney to leave Bobby, but Whitney refuses.

Whitney struggles to keep up with fame and placate Bobby, whose career has taken a back seat to hers, as she continues to dabble with drug use after their daughter Bobbi Kristina is born. Soon after, The Bodyguard and its subsequent soundtrack becomes massively successful, leading Whitney to tour internationally for nearly two years.

The pressure continues to grow for both Whitney and Bobby, primarily Whitney, who continues to abuse drugs at the height of her stardom. Bobby deals with his situation similarly after losing his childhood friend Steve in gun violence.

== Cast ==
- Yaya DaCosta as Whitney Houston
- Arlen Escarpeta as Bobby Brown
- Yolonda Ross as Robyn Crawford
- Suzzanne Douglas as Cissy Houston
- Mark Rolston as Clive Davis
- Wesley Jonathan as Babyface
- Reign Morton as Eddie Murphy
- Nafessa Williams as Kim
- James A. Watson Jr. as John Houston
- Deborah Lacey as Dionne Warwick (credited as "Award Presenter")
- Cornelius Smith Jr. as Michael Houston
- Tongayi Chirisa as Gary Houston
- Billy "Sly" Williams as Pastor Marvin Winans
- Saundra McClain as Aunt Bae
- Deborah Joy Winans as CeCe Winans
- Tim Bowman Jr. as BeBe Winans
- Hampton Fluker as Steve
- Kevontay Jackson as Club/Street Gangbanger (credited as "Gangbanger")

== Critical reception ==
Whitney has received mixed-to-positive reviews from critics and holds a 62% approval rating on Rotten Tomatoes. On Metacritic, which assigns a normalized rating out of 100 to reviews from mainstream critics, the film received an average score of 54%, based on 17 reviews.

Whitney received a total of 4.5 million viewers during its premiere.

== Accolades ==
| Award | Category | Recipient(s) | Result | Ref. |
|---|---|---|---|---|
| Black Reel Awards | Outstanding Director, TV Movie or Limited Series | Angela Bassett | Nominated | |
| Black Reel Awards | Outstanding Actress, TV Movie or Limited Series | Yaya DaCosta | Nominated | |
| Directors Guild of America Awards, USA | Outstanding Directing in Miniseries or TV Film | Angela Bassett | Nominated | |
| Imagen Awards | Best Primetime Program: Special or Made-for-TV-Movie | Whitney | Nominated | |
| Make-Up Artists and Hair Stylists Guild | Best Contemporary Makeup | Marietta Carter-Narcisse and Noreen Wilkie | Nominated | |
| Make-Up Artists and Hair Stylists Guild | Best Contemporary Hair Styling | Emanuel Millar and Rhonda O'Neal | Won | |
| NAACP Image Awards | Outstanding Writing in a Motion Picture, Television | Shem Bitterman | Nominated | |

== See also ==
- The Bobby Brown Story, a two-part miniseries that aired in 2018 on BET. Gabrielle Dennis portrays Houston in this miniseries.
- Whitney Houston: I Wanna Dance with Somebody, a 2022 biopic starring Naomi Ackie as Houston. Ashton Sanders portrays Brown in the film, in addition to Nafessa Williams playing Robyn Crawford.
