= Make-Up Artists & Hair Stylists Guild Award for Best Contemporary Makeup in a Television Special, One-Hour or More Live Program Series or Movie for Television =

Make-Up Artists and Hair Stylists Guild Award for Best Contemporary Makeup in a Television Special, One-Hour or More Live Program Series or Movie for Television
- Country: United States
- Presented by: Make-Up Artists and Hair Stylists Guild (MUAHS)
- First award: 2014
- Currently held by: Louie Zakarian, Amy Tagliamonti, Jason Milani, Young Bek, Madison Bermudez; Saturday Night Live (2025)
- Website: Make-Up Artists & Hair Stylists Guild

The Make-Up Artists and Hair Stylists Guild Award for Best Contemporary Makeup in a Motion Picture Made for Television or Special is one of the awards given annually to people working in the television industry by the Make-Up Artists and Hair Stylists Guild (MUAHS). It is presented to makeup artists who work in television, whose work has been deemed "best" in a given year. The award was first given in 2000, during the first annual awards, and was given when the awards were brought back in 2014. During the 2001 and 2002 ceremonies, as well as ceremonies from 2015 to 2018, the awards made the distinction between regular series and miniseries/television films. This was amended in 2019, when miniseries nominees were placed alongside continuing series, while television films and specials were given their own category.

== Winners and nominees ==
=== 2000s ===
Best Contemporary Makeup – Television (for a Mini-Series/Motion Picture Made for Television)

Year	Program	Nominees	Network
(2000); 2nd
(2000); 2nd	Running Mates	Lon Bentley, Rick Sharp, Leonard Engelman	TNT
(2000); 2nd	An American Daughter	Brigitte Bugayong, Christina Criswell, Barrie Buckner	Lifetime
(2000); 2nd	On the Beach	Brad Smith	Showtime

Best Makeup – Television Mini-Series/Movie of the Week

Year	Program	Nominees	Network
(2002); 4th
(2002); 4th	Gleason	Greg Cannom, Wesley Wofford, Erik Gosselin	CBS
(2002); 4th	Civil War Combat	Susan Seligman	History Channel
(2002); 4th	Live from Baghdad	David Forrest, Robert Ryan	HBO
(2003); 5th
(2003); 5th	Tracey Ullman in the Trailer Tales	Matthew W. Mungle, Sally Sutton, Kate Shorter	HBO
(2003); 5th	And Starring Pancho Villa as Himself	Dorothy J. Pearl	HBO
(2003); 5th	Normal	Hallie D'Amore, Linda Melazzo, Dorothy J. Pearl	HBO

Best Contemporary Makeup in a Television Mini-Series or Motion Picture Made for Television

Year	Program	Nominees	Network
(2014); 7th
(2014); 7th	Fargo	Gail Kennedy, Joanne Preece, Gunther Schetterer	FX
(2014); 7th	Reckless	Jeanne Van Phue, Gigi Collins, Ashleigh Chavis	CBS
(2014); 7th	Sherlock	Claire Pritchard, Sarah Astley	PBS
(2015); 8th
(2015); 8th	Scream Queens	Eryn Krueger Mekash, Kelley Mitchell, Melissa Buell	Fox
(2015); 8th	Strike Back	Sue Michael	Cinemax
(2015); 8th	Whitney	Marietta Carter-Narcisse, Noreen Wilkie	Lifetime
(2016); 9th
(2016); 9th	The Rocky Horror Picture Show: Let's Do the Time Warp Again	Julia Valente, Pipsan Ayotte	Fox
(2016); 9th	Gilmore Girls: A Year in the Life	Tegan Taylor, Tania McComas	Netflix
(2016); 9th	The Girlfriend Experience	Randy Daudlin	Starz
(2016); 9th	Love by the 10th Date	Dionne Wynn, Stephanie Bravo	Lifetime
(2016); 9th	Mascots	Gigi Williams, Michelle Audrina Kim	Netflix
(2017); 10th
(2017); 10th	Big Little Lies	Steve Artmont, Nicole Artmont	HBO
(2017); 10th	American Horror Story: Cult	Eryn Krueger Mekash, Kim Ayers, Silvina Knight	FX
(2017); 10th	Fargo	Gail Kennedy, Joanne Preece, Danielle Hanson	FX
(2017); 10th	Michael Jackson: Searching for Neverland	Geneva Nash Morgan, Susan Laprelle, April M. Chaney	Lifetime
(2017); 10th	Twin Peaks	Debbie Zoller, Richard Redlefsen, Mandi Ann Ruiz	Showtime

Best Contemporary Makeup in a Motion Picture Made for Television or Special

Year	Program	Nominees	Network
(2018); 11th
(2018); 11th	King Lear	Charles G. LaPointe, Kevin Maybee	Amazon
(2018); 11th	2018 MTV Video Music Awards	Dionne Wynn	MTV
(2018); 11th	A Legendary Christmas with John and Chrissy	April M. Chaney, Allison Bryan, Vanessa Dionne	NBC
(2018); 11th	Oprah Winfrey Presents: Becoming Michelle Obama	Derrick Rutledge	OWN
(2018); 11th	To All the Boys I've Loved Before	Sharon Toohey, Madison Farwell	Netflix
(2019); 12th
(2019); 12th	Saturday Night Live	Louie Zakarian, Amy Tagliamonti, Jason Milani	NBC
(2019); 12th	American Idol	Tonia Green, Gina Ghiglieri, Michelle Chung	ABC
(2019); 12th	Dancing with the Stars	Julie Socash, Alison Gladieux, Donna J. Bard	ABC
(2019); 12th	So You Think You Can Dance	Tonia Green, Silvia Leczel, Alison Gladieux	Fox
(2019); 12th	World of Dance	Tonia Green, Danielle Rush	NBC

=== 2020s ===
Best Contemporary Makeup- Television Special, One-Hour or More Live Program Series or Movie for Television

Year	Program	Nominees	Network
(2020); 13th
(2020); 13th	Saturday Night Live	Louie Zakarian, Amy Tagliamonti, Jason Milani, Joanna Pisani	NBC
(2020); 13th	Dancing with the Stars	Zena S. Green, Julie Socash, Donna Bard, Victor Del Castillo	ABC
(2020); 13th	The Oscars	Bruce Grayson, Angela Moos, Jennifer Aspinall, James MacKinnon	ABC
(2020); 13th	Killing Eve (season 3)	Juliette Tomes, Amy Brand	BBC America
(2020); 13th	Mariah Carey's Magical Christmas Special	Bruce Grayson, Angela Moos, Kristofer Buckle, James MacKinnon	Apple TV+
(2021); 14th
(2021); 14th	Saturday Night Live	Louie Zakarian, Amy Tagliamonti, Jason Milani, Rachel Paganii	NBC
(2021); 14th	Dancing with the Stars	Julie Socash, Alison Gladieux, Donna Bard, Barbi Fonte	ABC
(2021); 14th	Legendary	Tonia Nichole Green, Tyson Fountaine, Glen Alen, Valente Frazier	HBO Max
(2021); 14th	Muppets Haunted Mansion	Elle Favorule, Sonia Cabrera, Michelle Sfarzo	Disney+
(2021); 14th	The Voice	Darcy Gilmore, Ashlyn McIntyre, Gloria Elias-Foeillet, Ashley Holm	NBC
(2022); 15th
(2022); 15th	Legendary	Tonia Green, Tyson Fountaine, Silvia Leczel, Sean Conklin	HBO Max
(2022); 15th	Beauty and the Beast: A 30th Celebration	Bruce Grayson, James MacKinnon, Melanie Weaver, Angie Wells	ABC
(2022); 15th	Dancing with the Stars	Julie Socash, Donna Bard, Alison L. Gladieux, Farah Bunch	Disney+
(2022); 15th	Saturday Night Live	Louie Zakarian, Amy Tagliamonti, Jason Milani, Young Bek	NBC
(2022); 15th	The Voice	Darcy Gilmore, Gina Ghiglieri, Ernesto Casillas, Kristene Bernard	NBC
(2023); 16th
(2023); 16th	Dancing with the Stars	Julie Socash, Donna Bard, Lois Harriman, Sarah Woolf	ABC; Disney+
(2023); 16th	American Idol	Tonia Green, Gina Ghiglieri, Natalie Malchev, Michael Anthony	ABC
(2023); 16th	Nickelodeon Kids' Choice Awards	Thad Nalitz, Alison Gladieux, Christina Jimenez, Kathy Santiago	Nickelodeon
(2023); 16th	Saturday Night Live	Louie Zakarian, Amy Tagliamonti, Jason Milani, Young Bek	NBC
(2023); 16th	The Voice	Darcy Gilmore, Gina Ghiglieri, Kristene Bernard, Marylin Lee Spiegel	NBC
(2024); 17th
(2024); 17th	Saturday Night Live	Louie Zakarian, Amy Tagliamonti, Jason Milani, Young Bek, Daniela Zivkovic	NBC; Peacock
(2024); 17th	Dancing with the Stars	Zena Green, Julie Socash, Angela Moos, Alison Gladieux, Glen Alen	ABC
(2024); 17th	Gaga Chromatica Ball	Sarah Tanno, Phuong Tran	HBO Max
(2024); 17th	So You Think You Can Dance	Beth Pilgreen, Lauren Killip, Hannah Baxter, Jan Rooney, Desha Hayes	Fox
(2024); 17th	The Voice	Darcy Gilmore, Gina Ghiglieri, Kristene Bernard, Marylin Lee Spiegel, Kathleen Karridene	NBC
(2025); 18th
(2025); 18th	Saturday Night Live	Louie Zakarian, Amy Tagliamonti, Jason Milani, Young Bek, Madison Bermudez	NBC; Peacock
(2025); 18th	A Nonsense Christmas with Sabrina Carpenter	Diana Oh, Vanessa Dionne, Alicia Carbajal, Carolina Gonzalez, Ashley Joy Beck	Netflix
(2025); 18th	Dancing with the Stars	Zena Green, Angela Moos, Alison Gladieux, Farah Bunch, Sarah Benjamin Hall	ABC
(2025); 18th	The Voice	Darcy Gilmore, Marylin Lee Spiegel, Gina Ghiglieri, Kristene Bernard, Kristina Frisch	NBC
(2025); 18th	Wicked: One Wonderful Night	Bruce Grayson, Brielle McKenna, Levi Vieira, Sean Conklin	NBC
