= Make-Up Artists & Hair Stylists Guild Award for Contemporary Makeup in a Television Series, Television Limited or Miniseries or Television New Media Series =

Make-Up Artists and Hair Stylists Guild Award for Contemporary Makeup in a Television Series, Television Limited or Miniseries or Television New Media Series
- Country: United States
- Presented by: Make-Up Artists and Hair Stylists Guild (MUAHS)
- First award: 2014
- Currently held by: Tyson Fountaine, Melissa Buell, Ron Pipes, Gage Munster; American Horror Stories (2021)
- Website: Make-Up Artists & Hair Stylists Guild

The Make-Up Artists and Hair Stylists Guild Award for Contemporary Makeup in a Television Series, Television Limited or Miniseries or Television New Media Series is one of the awards given annually to people working in the television industry by the Make-Up Artists and Hair Stylists Guild (MUAHS). It is presented to makeup artists who work in television, whose work has been deemed "best" in a given year. The award was first given in 2000, during the first annual awards, and was given when the awards were brought back in 2014. During the 2001 and 2002 ceremonies, as well as ceremonies from 2015 to 2018, the awards made the distinction between regular series and miniseries/television films. This was amended in 2019, when miniseries nominees were placed alongside continuing series, while television films and specials were given their own category.

== Winners and nominees ==
=== 1990s ===
Year	Program	Episode(s)	Nominees	Network
(1999); 1st	Best Contemporary Makeup – Television (for a Single Episode of a Regular Series – Sitcom, Drama or Daytime)			
(1999); 1st	Providence	"Thank You Providence"	James MacKinnon, Stephanie A. Fowler	NBC
(1999); 1st	Will & Grace	"I Never Promised You an Olive Garden"	Cynthia Bachman Brown, Patricia Bunch	NBC
(1999); 1st	Will & Grace	"Big Brother is Coming"	Cynthia Bachman Brown, Patricia Bunch	NBC

=== 2000s ===
Year	Program	Episode(s)	Nominees	Network
(2000); 2nd	Best Contemporary Makeup – Television (for a Single Episode of a Regular Series – Sitcom, Drama or Daytime)			
(2000); 2nd	Sex and the City	"Don't Ask, Don't Tell"	Michelle Johnson	HBO
(2000); 2nd	Buffy the Vampire Slayer	"Restless"	Todd McIntosh, Brigette A. Myre, Robin Beauchesne, David DeLeon, Kate Biscoe	The WB
(2000); 2nd	Friends	"The One That Could Have Been"	Robin Siegel, Beth Katz, Anne Sweeting, Kevin Haney	NBC
(2000); 2nd	Best Contemporary Makeup – Television (for a Mini-Series/Motion Picture Made for Television)			
(2000); 2nd	Running Mates		Lon Bentley, Rick Sharp, Leonard Engelman	TNT
(2000); 2nd	An American Daughter		Brigitte Bugayong, Christina Criswell, Barrie Buckner	Lifetime
(2000); 2nd	On the Beach		Brad Smith	Showtime
(2001); 3rd	Best Contemporary Makeup – Television (for a Single Episode of a Regular Series – Sitcom, Drama or Daytime)			
(2001); 3rd	Six Feet Under	"An Open Book"	Donna-Lou Henderson, Justin B. Henderson, Michelle Vittone, Pamela Santori	HBO
(2001); 3rd	Alias	"Truth Be Told"	Angela Nogaro, Diana Brown, Gilbert A. Mosko	ABC
(2001); 3rd	Friends	"The One with the Halloween Party"	Robin Siegel, Beth Katz, Sheree Morgan	NBC

Year	Program	Nominees	Network
(2002); 4th	Best Contemporary Makeup – Television Series		
(2002); 4th	Alias	Angela Nogaro, Diana Brown	ABC
(2002); 4th	Sex and the City	Nicki Ledermann, Judy Chin, Kerrie R. Plant, Maryann Marchetti	HBO
(2002); 4th	Six Feet Under	Donna-Lou Henderson, Justin B. Henderson, Michelle Vittone	HBO
(2002); 4th	Best Makeup – Television Mini-Series/Movie of the Week		
(2002); 4th	Gleason	Greg Cannom, Wesley Wofford, Erik Gosselin	CBS
(2002); 4th	Civil War Combat	Susan Seligman	History Channel
(2002); 4th	Live from Baghdad	David Forrest, Robert Ryan	HBO
(2003); 5th	Best Contemporary Makeup – Television Series		
(2003); 5th	Sex and the City	Judy Chin, Nicki Ledermann, Kerrie R. Plant	HBO
(2003); 5th	Nip/Tuck	Eryn Krueger Mekash, Stephanie A. Fowler	FX
(2003); 5th	Six Feet Under	Donna-Lou Henderson, Justin B. Henderson, Megan Moore	HBO
(2003); 5th	Best Makeup – Television Mini-Series/Movie of the Week		
(2003); 5th	Tracey Ullman in the Trailer Tales	Matthew W. Mungle, Sally Sutton, Kate Shorter	HBO
(2003); 5th	And Starring Pancho Villa as Himself	Dorothy J. Pearl	HBO
(2003); 5th	Normal	Hallie D'Amore, Linda Melazzo, Dorothy J. Pearl	HBO

=== 2010s ===
Year	Program	Nominees	Network
(2013); 6th	Best Contemporary Makeup in Television and New Media Series		
(2013); 6th	Breaking Bad	Tarra D. Day, Steve La Porte	AMC
(2013); 6th	Glee	Kelley Mitchell, Jennifer Greenberg	Fox
(2013); 6th	Super Fun Night	Debbie Zoller, Tami Lane	ABC
(2013); 6th	Best Contemporary Makeup in a Television Mini-Series or Motion Picture Made for Television		
(2013); 6th	Fargo	Gail Kennedy, Joanne Preece, Gunther Schetterer	FX
(2013); 6th	Reckless	Jeanne Van Phue, Gigi Collins, Ashleigh Chavis	CBS
(2013); 6th	Sherlock	Claire Pritchard, Sarah Astley	PBS
(2014); 7th	Best Contemporary Makeup in Television and New Media Series		
(2014); 7th	Sons of Anarchy	Tracey Anderson, Michelle Garbin, Sabine Roller	FX
(2014); 7th	Dancing with the Stars	Zena Shteysel, Angela Moos, Patti Ramsey Bortoli	ABC
(2014); 7th	House of Cards	Tricia Sawyer, Vasilios Tanis	Netflix
(2014); 7th	Orange Is the New Black	Michal Bigger, Karen Reuter Fabbo	Netflix
(2014); 7th	True Detective	Felicity Bowring, Linda Dowds	HBO
(2014); 7th	The Walking Dead	Essie Cha, Mayumi Murakami, Chauntelle Langston	AMC
(2015); 8th
(2015); 8th	Dancing with the Stars	Zena Shteysel, Angela Moos, Patti Ramsey Bortoli	ABC
(2015); 8th	Empire	Beverly Jo Pryor, Ashunta Sheriff	Fox
(2015); 8th	House of Cards	Tricia Sawyer, Vasilios Tanis	Netflix
(2015); 8th	Transparent	Emma Johnston Burton, Molly Tissavary, Ela Barczewska	Amazon
(2015); 8th	The Walking Dead	Essie Cha, Mayumi Murakami, Chauntelle Langston	AMC
(2015); 8th	Best Contemporary Makeup in a Television Mini-Series or Motion Picture Made for Television		
(2015); 8th	Scream Queens	Eryn Krueger Mekash, Kelley Mitchell, Melissa Buell	Fox
(2015); 8th	Strike Back	Sue Michael	Cinemax
(2015); 8th	Whitney	Marietta Carter-Narcisse, Noreen Wilkie	Lifetime
(2016); 9th	Best Contemporary Makeup in Television and New Media Series		
(2016); 9th	Westworld	Christien Tinsley, Elisa Marsh, Rolf John Keppler	HBO
(2016); 9th	Empire	Beverly Jo Pryor, Eric Pagdin, Ashunta Sheriff	Fox
(2016); 9th	Saturday Night Live	Louie Zakarian, Amy Tagliamonti, Jason Milani	NBC
(2016); 9th	Transparent	Emma Johnston Burton, Malanie J. Romero, Tonyia Verna	Amazon
(2016); 9th	The Voice	Darcy Gilmore, Kristene Bernard, Diane Mayo	NBC
(2016); 9th	Best Contemporary Makeup in a Television Mini-Series or Motion Picture Made for Television		
(2016); 9th	The Rocky Horror Picture Show: Let's Do the Time Warp Again	Julia Valente, Pipsan Ayotte	Fox
(2016); 9th	Gilmore Girls: A Year in the Life	Tegan Taylor, Tania McComas	Netflix
(2016); 9th	The Girlfriend Experience	Randy Daudlin	Starz
(2016); 9th	Love by the 10th Date	Dionne Wynn, Stephanie Bravo	Lifetime
(2016); 9th	Mascots	Gigi Williams, Michelle Audrina Kim	Netflix
(2017); 10th
(2017); 10th	Dancing with the Stars	Zena Shteysel, Angela Moos, Sarah Woolf	ABC
(2017); 10th	Grace and Frankie	Robin Siegel, David DeLeon, Bonita DeHaven	Netflix
(2017); 10th	The Handmaid's Tale	Burton J. LeBlanc, Talia Reingold, Erika Caceres	Hulu
(2017); 10th	RuPaul's Drag Race	David Petruschin, Jen Fregozo, Natasha Marcelina	VH1
(2017); 10th	Saturday Night Live	Louie Zakarian, Amy Tagliamonti, Jason Milani	NBC
(2017); 10th	Best Contemporary Makeup in a Television Mini-Series or Motion Picture Made for Television		
(2017); 10th	Big Little Lies	Steve Artmont, Nicole Artmont	HBO
(2017); 10th	American Horror Story: Cult	Eryn Krueger Mekash, Kim Ayers, Silvina Knight	FX
(2017); 10th	Fargo	Gail Kennedy, Joanne Preece, Danielle Hanson	FX
(2017); 10th	Michael Jackson: Searching for Neverland	Geneva Nash Morgan, Susan Laprelle, April M. Chaney	Lifetime
(2017); 10th	Twin Peaks	Debbie Zoller, Richard Redlefsen, Mandi Ann Ruiz	Showtime
(2018); 11th	Best Contemporary Makeup in Television and New Media Series		
(2018); 11th	American Horror Story: Apocalypse	Eryn Krueger Mekash, Kim Ayers, Silvina Knight	FX
(2018); 11th	Dancing with the Stars	Julie Socash, Alison Gladieux, Donna J. Bard	ABC
(2018); 11th	The Handmaid's Tale	Karola Dirnberger, Ewa Latak-Cynk	Hulu
(2018); 11th	Saturday Night Live	Louie Zakarian, Amy Tagliamonti, Jason Milani	NBC
(2018); 11th	Westworld	Elisa Marsh, Allan A. Apone, Rachel Hoke	HBO
(2019); 12th
(2019); 12th	Big Little Lies	Michelle Radow, Erin Rosenmann	HBO
(2019); 12th	Euphoria	Doniella Davy, Kirsten Coleman	HBO
(2019); 12th	Grace and Frankie	Melissa Sandora, David DeLeon, Bonita DeHaven	Netflix
(2019); 12th	The Handmaid's Tale	Burton J. LeBlanc, Alastair Muir, Faye Crasto	Hulu
(2019); 12th	Russian Doll	Amy L. Forsythe, Heidi Pakdel, Danielle Minnella	Fox

=== 2020s ===
Year	Program	Nominees	Network
(2020); 13th
(2020); 13th	Westworld	Elisa Marsh, John Damiani, Jennifer Aspinall, Rachel Hoke	HBO
(2020); 13th	Dead to Me	Jacqueline Knowlton, Toryn Reed, Kim Greene, Liz Lash	Netflix
(2020); 13th	Grace and Frankie	Melissa Sandora, David De Leon, Bonita De Haven	Netflix
(2020); 13th	Ozark	Tracy Ewell, Jillian Erickson, Susan Reilly Lehane	Netflix
(2020); 13th	RuPaul’s Drag Race	Natasha Marcelina, Jen Fregozo	VH1
(2020); 13th	Schitt’s Creek	Candice Ornstein, Kerry Vaughan	Pop!
(2021); 14th
(2021); 14th	American Horror Stories	Tyson Fountaine, Melissa Buell, Ron Pipes, Gage Munster	FX on Hulu
(2021); 14th	Emily in Paris	Odile Fourquin, Aurélie Payen, Carole Nicolas, Corinne Maillard	Netflix
(2021); 14th	Mare of Easttown	Debi Young, Ngozi Olandu Young, Sandra Linn, Rachel Geary	HBO
(2021); 14th	RuPaul's Drag Race	David Petruschin, Jen Fregozo, Nicole Faulkner	VH1
(2021); 14th	WandaVision	Tricia Sawyer, Vasilios Tanis	Disney+
(2022); 15th
(2022); 15th	Euphoria	Doniella Davy, Tara Lang Shah, Alexandra J. French	HBO
(2022); 15th	Abbott Elementary	Alisha L. Baijounas, Jenn Bennett, Constance Foe, Emilia Werynska	ABC
(2022); 15th	Emily in Paris	Aurélie Payen, Joséphine Bouchereau, Carole Nicolas, Corinne Maillard	Netflix
(2022); 15th	Hacks	Bridget O'Neill	HBO Max
(2022); 15th	The White Lotus	Rebecca Hickey, Federica Emidi	HBO
