= Make-Up Artists & Hair Stylists Guild Award for Best Contemporary Hair Styling in Television and New Media Series =

Make-Up Artists and Hair Stylists Guild Award for Best Contemporary Hair Styling in Television and New Media Series
- Country: United States
- Presented by: Make-Up Artists and Hair Stylists Guild (MUAHS)
- First award: 2014
- Currently held by: Odile Fourquin, Mike Desir, Carole Nicolas, Frederic Souquet; Emily in Paris (2021)
- Website: Make-Up Artists & Hair Stylists Guild

The Make-Up Artists and Hair Stylists Guild Award for Best Contemporary Hair Styling in Television and New Media Series is one of the awards given annually to people working in the television industry by the Make-Up Artists and Hair Stylists Guild (MUAHS). It is presented to hair stylists who work in television, whose work has been deemed "best" in a given year. The award was first given in 2000, during the first annual awards, and was given when the awards were brought back in 2014. During the 2001 and 2002 ceremonies, as well as ceremonies from 2015 to 2018, the awards made the distinction between regular series and miniseries/television films. This was amended in 2019, when miniseries nominees were placed alongside continuing series, while television films and specials were given their own category.

== Winners and nominees ==
=== 1990s ===
Year	Program	Episode(s)	Nominees	Network
(1999); 1st	Best Contemporary Hair Styling – Television (for a Single Episode of a Regular Series – Sitcom, Drama or Daytime)			
(1999); 1st	Mad About You	"The Final Frontier"	Darrell Redleaf-Fielder, Jonathan Hanousek, Joy Zapata	NBC
(1999); 1st	Charmed	"The Devil's Music"	Kent Nelson, Suzanne Kontonickas	The WB
(1999); 1st	Will & Grace	"Homo for the Holidays"	Tim Burke	NBC

=== 2000s ===
Year	Program	Episode(s)	Nominees	Network
(2000); 2nd
(2000); 2nd	Sex and the City	"Don't Ask, Don't Tell"	Michelle Johnson	HBO
(2000); 2nd	Buffy the Vampire Slayer	"Restless"	Michael Moore, Lisa Marie Rosenberg, Gloria Pasqua-Casny	The WB
(2000); 2nd	The West Wing	"Noël"	Jeffrey Sacino, Tony Williams	NBC
(2000); 2nd	Best Contemporary Hair Styling – Television (for a Mini-Series/Motion Picture Made for Television)			
(2000); 2nd	An American Daughter		Gabor Heiligenberg	Lifetime
(2000); 2nd	The Corner		Mary Cooke, Sheila Cyphers-Leake	HBO
(2000); 2nd	Running Mates		Marlene D. Williams, Darlene Brumfield	TNT
(2001); 3rd	Best Contemporary Hair Styling – Television (for a Single Episode of a Regular Series – Sitcom, Drama or Daytime)			
(2001); 3rd	Will & Grace	"Moveable Feast"	Tim Burke, Luke O’Connor, Mary Guerrero	NBC
(2001); 3rd	Buffy the Vampire Slayer	"Once More, with Feeling"	Karl Wesson, Lisa Marie Rosenberg, Sean Flanigan	The WB
(2001); 3rd	MADtv	"Episode #616"	Matthew Kasten, Mishell Chandler, Rod Ortega, Desmond Miller	Fox

Year	Program	Nominees	Network
(2002); 4th	Best Contemporary Hair Styling – Television Series		
(2002); 4th	Sex and the City	Wayne Herndon, Donna Marie Fischetto, Suzana Neziri	HBO
(2002); 4th	Alias	Michael Reitz, Karen Bartek	ABC
(2002); 4th	Six Feet Under	Randy Sayer, Kimberley Spiteri, Pinky Babajian	HBO
(2002); 4th	Best Hair Styling – Television Mini-Series/Movie of the Week		
(2002); 4th	The Locket	Steven Mack, Gina Baran	CBS
(2002); 4th	The Big Time	Marsha Lewis, Maggie Hayes-Jackson, Monica Helpman	TNT
(2002); 4th	The Laramie Project	Roseanne Reid, Tanya Barnes-Jones	HBO
(2003); 5th	Best Contemporary Hair Styling – Television Series		
(2003); 5th	Sex and the City	Mandy Lyons, Donna Marie Fischetto, Peggy Schierholz	HBO
(2003); 5th	Alias	Michael Reitz, Karen Bartek, Grace Hernandez	ABC
(2003); 5th	Six Feet Under	Randy Sayer, Dennis Parker, Pinky Babajian	HBO
(2003); 5th	Best Hair Styling – Television Mini-Series/Movie of the Week		
(2003); 5th	Normal	Bunny Parker, Tony Mirante, Linda De Andrea	HBO
(2003); 5th	National Lampoon's Christmas Vacation 2	Danny Valencia, Patricia Gundlach	NBC
(2003); 5th	A Painted House	Alicia M. Tripi	CBS

=== 2010s ===
Year	Program	Nominees	Network
(2013); 6th	Best Contemporary Hair Styling in Television and New Media Series		
(2013); 6th	The Voice	Shawn Finch, Jerilynn Straitiff	NBC
(2013); 6th	Bates Motel	Donna Bis	A&E
(2013); 6th	Breaking Bad	Geordie Sheffer, Carmen L. Jones	AMC
(2014); 7th
(2014); 7th	Dancing with the Stars	Mary Guerrero, Kim Messina, Jennifer Guerrero-Mazursky	ABC
(2014); 7th	House of Cards	Sean Flanigan, Shunika Terry	Netflix
(2014); 7th	Orange Is the New Black	Angel De Angelis, Valerie Velez	Netflix
(2014); 7th	Pretty Little Liars	Kim M. Ferry, Shari Perry	ABC Family
(2014); 7th	The Voice	Shawn Finch, Jerilynn Straitiff, Cheryl Marks	NBC
(2014); 7th	Best Contemporary Hair Styling in a Television Mini-Series or Motion Picture Made for Television		
(2014); 7th	Sherlock	Claire Pritchard, Sarah Astley	PBS
(2014); 7th	Fargo	Gail Kennedy, Joanne Preece	FX
(2014); 7th	Reckless	Jeanne Van Phue, Gigi Collins	CBS
(2015); 8th	Best Contemporary Hair Styling in Television and New Media Series		
(2015); 8th	Dancing with the Stars	Mary Guerrero, Kim Messina, Jennifer Guerrero-Mazursky	ABC
(2015); 8th	Empire	Melissa Forney, Telona Wilson	Fox
(2015); 8th	House of Cards	Sean Flanigan, Michael Ward	Netflix
(2015); 8th	Transparent	Marie Larkin, Jean Webber, Bryn E. Leetch	Amazon
(2015); 8th	The Voice: Live Finale	Shawn Finch, Jerilynn Straitiff, Renee Ferruggia	NBC
(2015); 8th	Best Contemporary Hair Styling in a Television Mini-Series or Motion Picture Made for Television		
(2015); 8th	Whitney	Emanuel Millar, Rhonda O'Neal	Lifetime
(2016); 9th	Best Contemporary Hair Styling in Television and New Media Series		
(2016); 9th	Dancing with the Stars	Kim Messina, Gail Rowell-Ryan, Dean Banowetz	ABC
(2016); 9th	Empire	Melissa Forney, Theresa A. Fleming, Nolan Kelly	Fox
(2016); 9th	Scream Queens	Crystal M. Cook, Anna Quinn, Ai Nakata	Fox
(2016); 9th	Transparent	Terry Baliel, Roxane Griffin, Angela Gurule	Amazon
(2016); 9th	The Voice	Jerilynn Straitiff, Meagan Herrera, Renee Ferruggia	NBC
(2016); 9th	Best Contemporary Hair Styling in a Television Mini-Series or Motion Picture Made for Television		
(2016); 9th	American Horror Story: Roanoke	Michelle Ceglia, Valerie Jackson	FX
(2016); 9th	2016 MTV Video Music Awards	Shawn Finch, Kimberly Kimble	MTV
(2016); 9th	Gilmore Girls: A Year in the Life	Ange Grmolyes, Courtney Ullrich	Netflix
(2016); 9th	The Girlfriend Experience	Kristyan Mallett, Tanya Lodge	Starz
(2016); 9th	Mother, May I Sleep with Danger?	Connie Kallos, Dawn Victoria Dudley, Tyler Ely	Lifetime
(2017); 10th	Best Contemporary Hair Styling in Television and New Media Series		
(2017); 10th	Dancing with the Stars	Mary Guerrero, Kim Messina, Gail Rowell-Ryan	ABC
(2017); 10th	Empire	Melissa Forney, Theresa A. Fleming, Nolan Kelly	Fox
(2017); 10th	Grace and Frankie	Julie Rea, Jonathan Hanousek, Marlene D. Williams	Netflix
(2017); 10th	RuPaul's Drag Race	Gabriel Villarreal, Hector Pocasangre	VH1
(2017); 10th	Saturday Night Live	Jodi Mancuso, Jennifer Serio, Inga Thrasher	NBC
(2017); 10th	Best Contemporary Hair Styling in a Television Mini-Series or Motion Picture Made for Television		
(2017); 10th	Big Little Lies	Michelle Ceglia, Frances Mathias, Lona Vigi	HBO
(2017); 10th	2017 MTV Video Music Awards	Jerilynn Straitiff, Meagan Herrera, Maria Sandoval	MTV
(2017); 10th	American Horror Story: Cult	Michelle Ceglia, Samantha Wade, Brittany Madrigal	FX
(2017); 10th	Fargo	Chris Harrison-Glimsdale, Penny Thompson, Judy Durbacz	FX
(2017); 10th	Michael Jackson: Searching for Neverland	Karicean Karen Dick, Liz Ferguson	Lifetime
(2018); 11th	Best Contemporary Hair Styling in Television and New Media Series		
(2018); 11th	Dancing with the Stars	Gail Rowell-Ryan, Brittany Spaulding, Jani Kleinbard	ABC
(2018); 11th	American Horror Story: Apocalypse	Michelle Ceglia, Helena Cepeda, Romaine Markus	FX
(2018); 11th	Empire	Melissa Forney, Theresa A. Fleming, Nolan Kelly	Fox
(2018); 11th	Grace and Frankie	Kelly Kline, Jonathan Hanousek, Marlene D. Williams	Netflix
(2018); 11th	The Handmaid's Tale	Karola Dirnberger, Ewa Latak-Cynk	Hulu
(2019); 12th
(2019); 12th	Big Little Lies	Jose Zamora, Lorena Zamora, Lona Vigi	HBO
(2019); 12th	Black-ish	Araxi Lindsey, Enoch H. Williams IV	ABC
(2019); 12th	Empire	Melissa Forney, AL Payne, Nolan Kelly	Fox
(2019); 12th	Grace and Frankie	Kelly Kline, Jonathan Hanousek, Marlene D. Williams	Netflix
(2019); 12th	The Handmaid's Tale	Paul R.J. Elliot, Ewa Latak-Cynk	Hulu

=== 2020s ===
Year	Program	Nominees	Network
(2020); 13th
(2020); 13th	Schitt’s Creek	Annastasia Cucullo, Ana Sorys	Pop TV
(2020); 13th	Empire	Melissa Forney, Nolan Kelly, Al Payne, Sterfon Demings	FOX
(2020); 13th	Grace and Frankie	Kelly Kline, Jonathan Hanousek, Marlene Williams	Netflix
(2020); 13th	Ozark	Rita Parillo, Anna Hilton, Tanya Walker	Netflix
(2020); 13th	RuPaul’s Drag Race	Curtis Foreman, Ryan Randall	VH1
(2021); 14th
(2021); 14th	Emily in Paris	Odile Fourquin, Mike Desir, Carole Nicolas, Frederic Souquet	Netflix
(2021); 14th	Black-ish	Nena Ross-Davis, Stacey Morris, Lionel Brown, Marcia Hamilton	ABC
(2021); 14th	Grace and Frankie	Kelly Kline, Jonathan Hanousek, Marlene Williams	Netflix
(2021); 14th	Mare of Easttown	Kelly Kline, Jonathan Hanousek, Marlene Williams	HBO
(2021); 14th	RuPaul's Drag Race	Curtis Foreman, Ryan Randall	VH1
(2022); 15th	Abbott Elementary	Moira Frazier, Dustin Osborne, Christina R. Joseph	ABC
(2022); 15th	Black-ish	Nena Ross-Davis, Stacey Morris, Shirlena Allen, Debra Brown	ABC
(2022); 15th	American Horror Stories	Valerie Jackson, Lauren Poole, Suzette Boozer	FX on Hulu
(2022); 15th	Kindred	Jamie Amadio, Chantell Carrtherol	FX on Hulu
(2022); 15th	Emily in Paris	Carole Nicolas, Mike Désir, Miharu Oshima, Julien Parizet	Netflix
