= Leonard Engelman =

American makeup artist (1941–2024)

- Born: Leonard Alex Engelman; May 9, 1941
- Died: August 1, 2024 (aged 83); Los Angeles, California, U.S.
- Occupation: Make-up artist

Leonard Alex Engelman (May 9, 1941 – August 1, 2024) was an American make-up artist. He worked on the films Cat People (1982), Ghostbusters (1984), Beverly Hills Cop (1984), Rocky IV (1985), and How the Grinch Stole Christmas (2000), and the television programs Cagney & Lacey (1982) and The Shield (2004–2005).

Engelman was Cher's personal make-up artist, and he worked with her on the films Moonstruck (1987) and Tea with Mussolini (1999), as well as photo shoots. He served as a vice president and board member for the Academy of Motion Picture Arts and Sciences. He was nominated for two Primetime Emmy Awards for Outstanding Make-Up: one in 1972 for the episode "Pickman's Model" of Night Gallery and one in 2001 for Jackie Bouvier Kennedy Onassis. He received a Lifetime Achievement Award at the 2017 Make-Up Artists and Hair Stylists Guild Awards.

Engelman died at Northridge Hospital Medical Center in Los Angeles, on August 1, 2024, at the age of 83.

At the 97th Academy Awards, his name was mentioned in the In Memoriam section.
