= Make-Up Artists & Hair Stylists Guild Award for Best Contemporary Hair Styling in a Television Special, One-Hour or More Live Program Series or Movie for Television =

Make-Up Artists and Hair Stylists Guild Award for Best Contemporary Hair Styling in a Television Special, One-Hour or More Live Program Series or Movie for Television
- Country: United States
- Presented by: Make-Up Artists and Hair Stylists Guild (MUAHS)
- First award: 2019
- Currently held by: Jani Kleinbard, Gail Ryan, Cheryl Eckert, Regina Rodriquez; Dancing with the Stars (2021)
- Website: Make-Up Artists & Hair Stylists Guild

The Make-Up Artists and Hair Stylists Guild Award for Best Contemporary Hair Styling in a Motion Picture Made for Television or Special is one of the awards given annually to people working in the television industry by the Make-Up Artists and Hair Stylists Guild (MUAHS). It is presented to hair stylists who work in television, whose work has been deemed "best" in a given year. The award was first given in 2019. Before being singled out, television films and specials were nominated alongside miniseries in the category Best Contemporary Hair Styling in a Television Mini-Series or Motion Picture Made for Television.

== Winners and nominees ==
=== 2000s ===
Best Contemporary Hair Styling – Television (for a Mini-Series/Motion Picture Made for Television)

Year	Program	Nominees	Network
(2000); 2nd
(2000); 2nd	An American Daughter	Gabor Heiligenberg	Lifetime
(2000); 2nd	The Corner	Mary Cooke, Sheila Cyphers-Leake	HBO
(2000); 2nd	Running Mates	Marlene D. Williams, Darlene Brumfield	TNT

Best Hair Styling – Television Mini-Series/Movie of the Week

Year	Program	Nominees	Network
(2002); 4th
(2002); 4th	The Locket	Steven Mack, Gina Baran	CBS
(2002); 4th	The Big Time	Marsha Lewis, Maggie Hayes-Jackson, Monica Helpman	TNT
(2002); 4th	The Laramie Project	Roseanne Reid, Tanya Barnes-Jones	HBO
(2003); 5th
(2003); 5th	Normal	Bunny Parker, Tony Mirante, Linda De Andrea	HBO
(2003); 5th	National Lampoon's Christmas Vacation 2	Danny Valencia, Patricia Gundlach	NBC
(2003); 5th	A Painted House	Alicia M. Tripi	CBS

=== 2010s ===
Best Contemporary Hair Styling in a Television Mini-Series or Motion Picture Made for Television

Year	Program	Nominees	Network
(2014); 7th
(2014); 7th	Sherlock	Claire Pritchard, Sarah Astley	PBS
(2014); 7th	Fargo	Gail Kennedy, Joanne Preece	FX
(2014); 7th	Reckless	Jeanne Van Phue, Gigi Collins	CBS
(2015); 8th
(2015); 8th	Whitney	Emanuel Millar, Rhonda O'Neal	Lifetime
(2016); 9th
(2016); 9th	American Horror Story: Roanoke	Michelle Ceglia, Valerie Jackson	FX
(2016); 9th	2016 MTV Video Music Awards	Shawn Finch, Kimberly Kimble	MTV
(2016); 9th	Gilmore Girls: A Year in the Life	Ange Grmolyes, Courtney Ullrich	Netflix
(2016); 9th	The Girlfriend Experience	Kristyan Mallett, Tanya Lodge	Starz
(2016); 9th	Mother, May I Sleep with Danger?	Connie Kallos, Dawn Victoria Dudley, Tyler Ely	Lifetime
(2017); 10th
(2017); 10th	Big Little Lies	Michelle Ceglia, Frances Mathias, Lona Vigi	HBO
(2017); 10th	2017 MTV Video Music Awards	Jerilynn Straitiff, Meagan Herrera, Maria Sandoval	MTV
(2017); 10th	American Horror Story: Cult	Michelle Ceglia, Samantha Wade, Brittany Madrigal	FX
(2017); 10th	Fargo	Chris Harrison-Glimsdale, Penny Thompson, Judy Durbacz	FX
(2017); 10th	Michael Jackson: Searching for Neverland	Karicean Karen Dick, Liz Ferguson	Lifetime

Best Contemporary Hair Styling in a Motion Picture Made for Television or Special

Year	Program	Nominees	Network
(2018); 11th
(2018); 11th	Jesus Christ Superstar Live in Concert	Charles G. LaPointe, Kevin Maybee	NBC
(2018); 11th	2018 MTV Video Music Awards	Shawn Finch, Maggie Connolly	MTV
(2018); 11th	The 2018 Rose Parade Hosted by Cord & Tish	Candace Neal	Amazon Prime Video
(2018); 11th	King Lear	Naomi Donne, Sara Kramer	Amazon Prime Video
(2018); 11th	Oprah Winfrey Presents: Becoming Michelle Obama	Karola Dirnberger, Ewa Latak-Cynk	OWN
(2019); 12th
(2019); 12th	Dancing with the Stars	Mary Guerrero, Kim Messina, Gail Rowell-Ryan	ABC
(2019); 12th	America's Got Talent	Dean Banowetz, Ryan Randall, Cory Rotenberg	NBC
(2019); 12th	So You Think You Can Dance	Dean Banowetz, Melanie Verkins, Ryan Randall	Fox
(2019); 12th	The Voice	Jerilynn Straitiff, Meagan Herrera, Amber Nicholle Maher	NBC
(2019); 12th	World of Dance	Dean Banowetz, Meagan Herrera, Cory Rotenberg	NBC

=== 2020s ===
Best Contemporary Hair Styling- Television Special, One-Hour or More Live Program Series or Movie for Television

Year	Program	Nominees	Network
(2020); 13th
(2020); 13th	Dancing with the Stars	Kimi Messina, Jani Kleinbard, Regina Rodriquez, Roma Goddard	ABC
(2020); 13th	Trouble Don't Last Always	Melanie Smith, Kaity Licina	HBO
(2020); 13th	Mariah Carey's Magical Christmas Special	Jayson Medina, Abraham Esparza, Nicole Walpert, Brian Steven Banks	Apple TV+
(2020); 13th	Saturday Night Live (for "Host: Adele")	Jodi Mancuso, Cara Hannah, Inga Thrasher	NBC
(2020); 13th	The Voice	Jerilynn Stephens, Danilo Dixon, Roberto Ramos, Robert “LaMarr” Randall	NBC
(2021); 14th
(2021); 14th	Dancing with the Stars	Jani Kleinbard, Gail Ryan, Cheryl Eckert, Regina Rodriquez	ABC
(2021); 14th	Kelly Clarkson Presents: When Christmas Comes Around	Tara Copeland, Robert Ramos	NBC
(2021); 14th	The Voice	Jerilynn Stephens, Darbie Wieczorek, Roberto Ramos, Josh Liu	NBC
(2021); 14th	Legendary	Jerilynn Stephens, Kimi Messina, Kathleen Leonard, Dean Banowetz	HBO Max
(2021); 14th	Nicole Byer: BBW (Big Beautiful Weirdo)	Moira Frazier	Netflix
(2022); 15th	Dancing with the Stars	Kimi Messina, Jani Kleinbard, Cheryl Eckert, Gail Ryan	Disney+
(2022); 15th	Legendary	Jerilynn Stephens, Kimi Messina, Dean Francis Banowetz, Lalisa Turner	HBO Max
(2022); 15th	Lizzo's Watch Out for the Big Grrrls	Chantelle Johnson Mosley, Shelby Swain	Prime Video
(2022); 15th	So You Think You Can Dance	Dean Francis Banowetz, Kimi Messina, LaLisa Turner, Ryan Randall	Fox
(2022); 15th	The Voice	Jerilynn Stephens, Darbie Ann Wieczorek, Suzette Boozer, Robert Lamarr Randle	NBC
