= Make-Up Artists & Hair Stylists Guild =

American labor union

The Make-Up Artists and Hair Stylists Guild is an American labor union representing make-up artists and hair stylists in feature films, television programs, commercials, live network events and theatrical productions in the United States.

== Awards ==
The Local 706 chapter of the IATSE Union organizes annual Make-Up Artists & Hair Stylists Guild Awards. In 2016, the awards were divided into 19 different categories. The union also gives Lifetime Achievement Awards to honour the outstanding achievements in the industry, as well as a special Distinguished Artisan Award given to an actor or a filmmaker for their creative contributions.

Award categories

- Feature Motion Picture
  - Best Contemporary Make-Up
  - Best Contemporary Hair Styling
  - Best Period and/or Character Make-Up
  - Best Period and/or Character Hair Styling
  - Best Special Make-Up Effects
- Television and New Media Series
  - Best Contemporary Make-Up
  - Best Contemporary Hair Styling
  - Best Period and/or Character Make-Up
  - Best Period and/or Character Hair Styling
  - Best Special Make-Up Effects
- Motion Pictures Made for Television or Specials
  - Best Contemporary Make-Up
  - Best Contemporary Hair Styling
  - Best Period and/or Character Make-Up
  - Best Period and/or Character Hair Styling
  - Best Special Make-Up Effects
- Commercials and Music Videos
  - Best Make-Up
  - Best Hair Styling
- Theatrical Production
  - Best Make-Up
  - Best Hair Styling
- Children and Teen Programming
  - Best Make-Up
  - Best Hair Styling
- Daytime Television
  - Best Make-Up
  - Best Hair Styling

== Recognition ==
The members of the union have been acknowledged by various honorary organizations dedicated to the arts, and have won numerous Academy Awards, Emmy Awards, BAFTAs, and Saturn Awards. The Make-Up Artists and Hair Stylists Guild was chartered in 1937. It is Local 706 of the International Alliance of Theatrical Stage Employees (IATSE).

Karen Westerfield was elected in 2022 as the first Asian-American and the first woman to be the business representative of the union. Business representative is the top job at the union.

== See also ==
- Society of Makeup Artists
