= List of HBO Max original programming =

HBO Max (formerly Max) is an over-the-top subscription service owned and operated by Skydance Corporation and run by Warner Bros. Entertainment. It distributes a number of original shows, including original series, specials, miniseries, and documentaries and films. The movies and television shows produced for HBO Max are labeled as "Max Originals". HBO Max is an expanded library of programming compared to the former HBO Now, which only carried HBO programming. Max Originals are specifically made for audiences outside of the traditional baseline HBO brand.

== Current programming ==
=== Drama ===
Title	Genre	Premiere	Seasons	Runtime	Status
The Pitt	Medical drama	January 9, 2025	2 seasons, 30 episodes	40–60 min	Season 3 due to premiere in January 2027

=== Comedy ===
Title	Genre	Premiere	Seasons	Runtime	Status
Stuart Fails to Save the Universe	Science fiction comedy	July 23, 2026	1 season, 10 episodes	16–26 min	Renewed

=== Animation ===
==== Adult animation ====
Title	Genre	Premiere	Seasons	Runtime	Status
Adventure Time: Fionna and Cake	Fantasy adventure comedy	August 31, 2023	2 seasons, 20 episodes	24–27 min	Pending
Creature Commandos	Superhero	December 5, 2024	1 season, 7 episodes	22–23 min	Renewed

=== Non-English language scripted ===
==== French ====
Title	Genre	Premiere	Seasons	Runtime	Status
The Seduction (Note: Marketed as an "HBO Original", but the series was released exclusively on HBO Max in its home country.)	Period drama	November 14, 2025	1 season, 6 episodes	41–48 min	Pending
Privileges	Thriller	March 27, 2026	1 season, 6 episodes	42–51 min	Pending
Paolo	Psychological thriller	September 25, 2026	1 season, 7 episodes	56 min	Season 1 ongoing

==== German ====
Title	Genre	Premiere	Seasons	Runtime	Status
Banksters	Heist drama	February 20, 2026	1 season, 6 episodes	40–45 min	Pending
4 Blocks Zero	Crime drama	September 25, 2026	1 season, 8 episodes	56 min	Season 1 ongoing

==== Mandarin ====
Title	Genre	Premiere	Seasons	Runtime	Status
Fired Up!	Drama	July 31, 2026	1 seasons, 12 episodes	38–55 min	Pending
The Producer	Drama	August 28, 2026	1 season, 12 episodes	46–51 min	Season 1 ongoing

==== Polish ====
Title	Genre	Premiere	Seasons	Runtime	Status
The Thaw	Crime drama	April 1, 2022	3 seasons, 18 episodes	46–55 min	Pending
The Eastern Gate	Thriller	January 31, 2025	1 season, 6 episodes	41–54 min	Renewed
Proud	Drama	June 12, 2026	1 season, 8 episodes	31–43 min	Pending
The Torment	Crime drama	October 2, 2026	1 season, 6 episodes	43–49 min	Pending
Silent Night	Crime drama	November 13, 2026	1 season, 6 episodes	54 min	Season 1 ongoing

==== Portuguese ====
Title	Genre	Premiere	Seasons	Runtime	Status
Scars of Beauty	Telenovela	January 27, 2025	1 season, 40 episodes	47–60 min	Renewed
Madam Beja	Historical telenovela	February 2, 2026	1 season, 40 episodes	36–47 min	Pending

==== Spanish ====
Title	Genre	Premiere	Seasons	Runtime	Status
VGLY	Coming-of-age drama	May 25, 2023	2 seasons, 23 episodes	29–35 min	Pending
Margarita	Family comedy drama telenovela	September 2, 2024	3 seasons, 80 episodes	39–42 min	Pending
Rage	Dark comedy	July 11, 2025	2 seasons, 16 episodes	31–39 min	Season 2 ongoing
Collision	Telenovela	September 7, 2026	1 season, 39 episodes	38–47 min	Pending

==== Turkish ====
Title	Genre	Premiere	Seasons	Runtime	Status
The Graft	Drama	September 26, 2025	1 season, 8 episodes	47–52 min	Pending
Feride vs. the World	Adult animated comedy	November 21, 2025	1 season, 8 episodes	22 min	Pending
Jasmine	Crime drama	December 12, 2025	1 season, 6 episodes	28–37 min	Pending
Mira: Life After Divorce	Drama	March 13, 2026	1 season, 8 episodes	32–39 min	Pending

==== Other ====
Title	Genre	Premiere	Seasons	Runtime	Language	Status
Melania Rea	True crime drama	November 6, 2026	4 episodes	41 min	Italian	Miniseries ongoing

=== Unscripted ===
==== Docuseries ====
Title	Subject	Premiere	Seasons	Runtime	Language	Status
On the Roam	Travel	January 18, 2024	2 seasons, 14 episodes	39–59 min	English	Pending
Awaiting release
The Art of Deception	True crime	November 27, 2026	3 episodes	TBA	Polish	Miniseries
The Cursed Zoo	True crime	November 27, 2026	2 episodes	TBA	Danish	Miniseries
The Linares Files	Paranormal	November 27, 2026	TBA	TBA	Spanish	Miniseries
Seveso: The Dioxin Disaster	Disaster	December 4, 2026	3 episodes	TBA	Italian	Miniseries

=== Co-productions ===
These are productions that HBO Max co-produced and aired separately from the show's initial premiere on its parent network.

Title	Genre	Partner/Country	Premiere	Seasons	Runtime	Language	Status
Dylan's Playtime Adventures	Preschool comedy	CBC Kids/Canada; CBeebies/United Kingdom	March 6, 2025	1 season, 26 episodes	22 min	English	Pending

=== Continuations ===
These shows have been picked up by HBO Max for additional seasons after having aired previous seasons on another network.

Title	Genre	Prev. network(s)	Premiere	Seasons	Runtime	Language	Status
The Prince (season 3)	Satire	BluTV	May 9, 2025 (Note: Turkey); August 15, 2025 (Note: United States)	1 season, 8 episodes	46–65 min	Turkish	Pending
Pati (season 2)	Crime drama	Player	June 27, 2025	1 season, 6 episodes	41–44 min	Polish	Pending
Deeply (season 3)	Romantic drama anthology	BluTV	January 30, 2026; April 1, 2026	1 season, 6 episodes	54–75 min	Turkish	Pending

=== Regional original programming ===
These shows are originals because HBO Max commissioned or acquired them and had their premiere on the service, but they are not available worldwide.

Title	Genre	Premiere	Seasons	Runtime	Exclusive region(s)	Language	Status
El Chapulín and the Colorados	Animated comedy	January 1, 2026	1 season, 10 episodes	24 min	Caribbean and Latin America	Spanish	Renewed
In Utero	Medical drama	May 8, 2026	1 season, 8 episodes	45–55 min	Austria, Germany, Italy, Switzerland	Italian	Pending
Come Dine with Me: Celebrity Philippines	Reality	July 23, 2026	1 season, 20 episodes	38–45 min	Hong Kong, Southeast Asia and Taiwan	Filipino	Pending
Call My Manager	Comedy drama	August 13, 2026	1 season, 8 episodes	63–71 min	Hong Kong, Southeast Asia and Taiwan	Filipino	Pending
Peccato	Mockumentary	October 2, 2026	1 season, 6 episodes	29–33 min	Selected territories	Italian	Season 1 ongoing
In Vitro (Note: Co-production with 3Cat.)	Comedy drama	October 19, 2026	1 season, 6 episodes	40–45 min	Portugal and Spain	Catalan	Season 1 ongoing
Awaiting release
Alice (Note: Co-production with France Télévision)	Historical drama	December 4, 2026	6 episodes	45 min	Belgium and France	English; French	Miniseries

== Upcoming original programming ==
These shows have had their original production or additional seasons commissioned by HBO Max.

=== Drama ===
Title	Genre	Premiere	Seasons	Runtime	Status
How to Survive Without Me	Family drama	TBA	1 season, 15 episodes	TBA	Series order

=== Comedy ===
Title	Genre	Premiere	Seasons	Runtime	Status
The People v. Gorilla Grodd	Superhero comedy	TBA	1 season, 8 episodes	TBA	Series order

=== Animation ===
==== Adult animation ====
Title	Genre	Premiere	Seasons	Runtime	Status
Adventure Time: Bubblegum & Marceline	Fantasy adventure comedy	TBA	1 season, 10 episodes	TBA	Series order

=== Non-English language scripted ===
==== French ====
Title	Genre	Premiere	Seasons	Runtime	Status
Bodycam	Horror/Thriller	TBA	TBA	TBA	Series order
Rush	Medical drama	TBA	TBA	TBA	Series order

==== Spanish ====
Title	Genre	Premiere	Seasons	Runtime	Status
Carlota	Historical drama	TBA	TBA	TBA	Filming
Mataviejitas: The Serial Killer	Psychological thriller	TBA	1 season, 6 episodes	TBA	Filming
Don Ramón	Television comedy	TBA	TBA	TBA	Series order
Untitled Los Javis series	Mystery drama	TBA	TBA	TBA	Series order

==== Other ====
Title	Genre	Premiere	Seasons	Runtime	Language	Status
Untitled Struwwelpeter series	Thriller	2026	TBA	TBA	German	Series order
Véspera	Drama	TBA	1 season, 8 episodes	TBA	Portuguese	Post-production
500 Battiti	Medical drama	TBA	TBA	TBA	Italian	Series order
The First Göktürk	Historical fantasy	TBA	TBA	TBA	Turkish	Series order

=== Unscripted ===
==== Docuseries ====
Title	Subject	Premiere	Seasons	Runtime	Language	Status
Saman – The Hidden Truth	True crime	TBA	TBA	TBA	Italian	Series order
Tzantza	Anthropology/True crime	TBA	TBA	TBA	Italian	Series order

=== Co-productions ===
These are productions that HBO Max is co-producing and will separately from the show's initial premiere on its parent network.

Title	Genre	Partner/Country	Premiere	Seasons	Runtime	Language	Status
The Orphans	Drama	3Cat/Spain	2027	TBA	TBA	Catalan	Filming

=== Continuations ===
These shows have been picked up by HBO Max for additional seasons after having aired previous seasons on another network.

Title	Genre	Prev. network(s)	Premiere	Seasons	Runtime	Language	Status
Klara (season 2)	Comedy	Player	TBA	1 season, 8 episodes	TBA	Polish	Filming

=== In development ===
Title	Genre
The Assassin	Crime drama
Debbie	Legal drama
The Envoy	Action drama
Head Cases	Crime drama
Jane Smith	Legal thriller
NYPD Confidential	Crime drama
The Shore	Family drama
Six Days to Sunday	Drama
Untitled 300 prequel series	Historical action
Untitled law enforcement drama	Crime procedural
Welcome to Catalina	Police procedural
Your Second Wife	Erotic thriller

== Ended programming ==
These shows have either completed their runs or HBO Max stopped producing episodes. A show is also assumed to have ended if there has been no confirmed news of renewal at least one year after the show's last episode was released.

=== Drama ===
Title	Genre	Premiere	Finale	Seasons	Runtime	Notes
Raised by Wolves (Note: Unavailable)	Science fiction	September 3, 2020	March 17, 2022	2 seasons, 18 episodes	39–54 min	
Gossip Girl	Teen drama	July 8, 2021	January 26, 2023	2 seasons, 22 episodes	53–57 min	
Station Eleven	Post-apocalyptic drama	December 16, 2021	January 13, 2022	10 episodes	44–59 min	(Note: Miniseries)
DMZ	Dystopian alternate history drama	March 17, 2022		4 episodes	58–60 min	
Julia	Biographical drama	March 31, 2022	December 21, 2023	2 seasons, 16 episodes	43–49 min	
Tokyo Vice	Crime drama	April 7, 2022	April 4, 2024	2 seasons, 18 episodes	51–64 min	
The Staircase	Biographical crime drama	May 5, 2022	June 9, 2022	8 episodes	59–73 min	
Pretty Little Liars	Teen mystery crime thriller	July 28, 2022	June 20, 2024	2 seasons, 18 episodes	47–53 min	
Love & Death	Biographical crime drama	April 27, 2023	May 25, 2023	7 episodes	45–58 min	
Full Circle	Mystery	July 13, 2023	July 27, 2023	6 episodes	37–59 min	
The Girls on the Bus	Political comedy drama	March 14, 2024	May 9, 2024	1 season, 10 episodes	42–49 min	
Duster	Crime thriller	May 15, 2025	July 3, 2025	1 season, 8 episodes	44–54 min	

=== Comedy ===
Title	Genre	Premiere	Finale	Seasons	Runtime	Notes
Love Life	Romantic comedy anthology	May 27, 2020	November 11, 2021	2 seasons, 20 episodes	24–35 min	
The Flight Attendant	Mystery drama/Dark comedy	November 26, 2020	May 26, 2022	2 seasons, 16 episodes	37–48 min	
Generation	Teen comedy drama	March 11, 2021	July 8, 2021	1 season, 16 episodes	26–37 min	
Made for Love	Dark comedy	April 1, 2021	May 19, 2022	2 seasons, 16 episodes	24–32 min	
That Damn Michael Che	Sketch comedy	May 6, 2021	May 26, 2022	2 seasons, 12 episodes	19–23 min	
Hacks	Dark comedy drama	May 13, 2021	May 28, 2026	5 seasons, 47 episodes	24–37 min	
The Sex Lives of College Girls	Comedy drama	November 18, 2021	January 23, 2025	3 seasons, 30 episodes	22–51 min	
And Just Like That...	Romantic comedy	December 9, 2021	August 14, 2025	3 seasons, 33 episodes	34–45 min	
Peacemaker	Superhero comedy drama	January 13, 2022	October 9, 2025	2 seasons, 16 episodes	38–44 min	
Our Flag Means Death	Period comedy	March 3, 2022	October 26, 2023	2 seasons, 18 episodes	25–32 min	
Minx	Comedy	March 17, 2022	April 14, 2022	1 season, 10 episodes	24–35 min	(Note: Moved to Starz for season 2.)
Rap Sh!t	Music comedy	July 21, 2022	December 21, 2023	2 seasons, 16 episodes	27–37 min	
Bookie	Comedy	November 30, 2023	January 30, 2025	2 seasons, 16 episodes	21–28 min	

=== Kids & family ===
Title	Genre	Premiere	Finale	Seasons	Runtime	Notes
Mo Willems and the Storytime All-Stars Present: Don't Let the Pigeon Do Storytime! Shorts!	Family comedy	September 17, 2020		1 season, 8 episodes	4–8 min	
My Sesame Street Friends	Preschool education	November 12, 2020	January 16, 2025	15 seasons, 195 episodes	11–12 min	
Head of the Class	Teen sitcom	November 4, 2021		1 season, 10 episodes	21–27 min	
The Garcias	Family sitcom	April 14, 2022	May 12, 2022	1 season, 10 episodes	24–28 min	
Gordita Chronicles	Coming-of-age comedy	June 23, 2022		1 season, 10 episodes	24–30 min	
Charlotte's Web	Fantasy	October 2, 2025		3 episodes	45 min	

=== Animation ===
==== Adult animation ====
Title	Genre	Premiere	Finale	Seasons	Runtime	Notes
Close Enough	Surreal comedy	July 9, 2020	April 7, 2022	3 seasons, 24 episodes	22–24 min	
The Prince	Political satire/sitcom	July 29, 2021		1 season, 12 episodes	12–14 min	
Ten Year Old Tom	Sitcom	September 30, 2021	June 29, 2023	2 seasons, 20 episodes	25–28 min	
Santa Inc.	Workplace comedy	December 2, 2021		1 season, 8 episodes	21–25 min	
Velma	Mystery horror comedy	January 12, 2023	October 3, 2024	2 seasons, 21 episodes	23–28 min	
Fired on Mars	Science fiction workplace comedy	April 20, 2023	May 11, 2023	1 season, 8 episodes	23–31 min	
Young Love	Family sitcom	September 21, 2023	October 19, 2023	1 season, 12 episodes	20–26 min	
Scavengers Reign	Science fiction drama	October 19, 2023	November 9, 2023	1 season, 12 episodes	23–27 min	
Kite Man: Hell Yeah!	Superhero comedy	July 18, 2024	September 12, 2024	1 season, 10 episodes	23–24 min	

==== Kids & family ====
Title	Genre	Premiere	Finale	Seasons	Runtime	Notes
Looney Tunes Cartoons	Slapstick comedy	May 27, 2020	June 13, 2024	6 seasons, 82 episodes	9–29 min	
Adventure Time: Distant Lands	Science fantasy adventure comedy	June 25, 2020	September 2, 2021	4 episodes	45–49 min	
Tig n' Seek	Workplace comedy	July 23, 2020	May 26, 2022	4 seasons, 80 episodes	12 min	
The Fungies!	Fantasy comedy	August 20, 2020	December 16, 2021	3 seasons, 80 episodes	11–12 min	
Tom and Jerry Special Shorts	Slapstick comedy	February 20, 2021		1 season, 2 episodes	4–5 min	
Tom and Jerry in New York	Slapstick comedy	July 1, 2021	November 18, 2021	2 seasons, 13 episodes	20–21 min	
Jellystone!	Slapstick comedy	July 29, 2021	March 6, 2025	3 seasons, 77 episodes	11–22 min	
Little Ellen	Comedy	September 13, 2021	March 3, 2022	2 seasons, 20 episodes	11 min	
Yabba Dabba Dinosaurs	Comedy	September 30, 2021	February 17, 2022	2 seasons, 26 episodes	11 min	
Aquaman: King of Atlantis	Superhero	October 14, 2021	October 28, 2021	3 episodes	45 min	
Gremlins	Fantasy comedy	May 23, 2023	April 10, 2025	2 seasons, 20 episodes	23–24 min	
Hop	Comedy	April 4, 2024	August 14, 2025	1 season, 26 episodes	22 min	
Mermicorno: Starfall	Fantasy	January 30, 2025	May 15, 2025	2 seasons, 26 episodes	23 min	

=== Non-English language scripted ===
==== French ====
Title	Genre	Premiere	Finale	Seasons	Runtime	Notes
The Confidante	Drama	October 11, 2024	November 1, 2024	4 episodes	56 min	
Reformed	Comedy drama	March 28, 2025	April 18, 2025	1 season, 8 episodes	29–36 min	
Malditos	Drama	May 2, 2025	June 13, 2025	1 season, 7 episodes	44–47 min	

==== Polish ====
Title	Genre	Premiere	Finale	Seasons	Runtime	Notes
#BringBackAlice	Mystery thriller	April 14, 2023	May 12, 2023	1 season, 6 episodes	49–54 min	
X-Rated Queen	Crime drama	December 20, 2024	January 17, 2025	6 episodes	43–47 min	
A Decent Man	Drama	March 21, 2025	April 25, 2025	6 episodes	40–45 min	
The Heritage	Drama	August 22, 2025	October 3, 2025	1 season, 7 episodes	40–45 min	
Heaven	Drama	December 26, 2025	January 30, 2026	6 episodes	41–48 min	
Women's Hell	Drama	March 6, 2026	April 10, 2026	6 episodes	44–61 min	

==== Portuguese ====
Title	Genre	Premiere	Finale	Seasons	Runtime	Notes
This Is Luna	Romantic comedy	November 13, 2022		1 season, 10 episodes	29–35 min	
Teenage Kiss: The Future Is Dead	Teen drama	October 19, 2023	November 2, 2023	1 season, 8 episodes	23–32 min	
Divided Youth	Teen drama	April 4, 2024	April 18, 2024	1 season, 7 episodes	34–51 min	
Ângela Diniz: Murdered and Convicted	True crime drama	November 13, 2025	December 11, 2025	6 episodes	39–52 min	

==== Romanian ====
Title	Genre	Premiere	Finale	Seasons	Runtime	Notes
Ruxx	Comedy drama	March 8, 2022	April 15, 2022	1 season, 8 episodes	44–50 min	
Spy/Master	Spy drama	May 19, 2023	June 16, 2023	6 episodes	44–51 min	

==== Spanish ====
Title	Genre	Premiere	Finale	Seasons	Runtime	Notes
Dafne and the Rest	Comedy drama	October 26, 2021 (Note: Latin America); December 10, 2021 (Note: United States)	January 21, 2022	1 season, 8 episodes	30 min	
García!	Science fiction thriller	October 28, 2022	November 25, 2022	1 season, 6 episodes	54–59 min	
Poor Devil	Adult animation	February 17, 2023		1 season, 8 episodes	15–23 min	
Mariachis	Comedy drama	March 2, 2023		1 season, 8 episodes	32–47 min	
Headless Chickens	Sports comedy drama	April 28, 2023		1 season, 7 episodes	24–31 min	
I Love You and It Hurts	Teen drama	August 17, 2023	September 7, 2023	1 season, 13 episodes	34–45 min	
Candy Cruz	Comedy	October 19, 2023	November 2, 2023	1 season, 10 episodes	27–33 min	
Six Is Not a Crowd	Comedy drama	May 2, 2024	May 16, 2024	1 season, 8 episodes	33–42 min	
Coyotl, Hero and Beast	Supernatural crime drama	February 27, 2025	April 9, 2025	1 season, 8 episodes	57–66 min	
When No One Sees Us	Political thriller	March 7, 2025	April 25, 2025	8 episodes	36–48 min	
Chespirito: Not Really on Purpose	Biographical drama	June 5, 2025	July 24, 2025	8 episodes	43–50 min	

==== Other ====
Title	Genre	Premiere	Finale	Seasons	Runtime	Language	Notes
Kamikaze	Young adult thriller drama	November 14, 2021	December 5, 2021	1 season, 8 episodes	22–35 min	Danish	
Lust	Sex comedy	March 18, 2022		1 season, 8 episodes	25–29 min	Swedish	
The Informant	Spy thriller	April 1, 2022	May 13, 2022	1 season, 8 episodes	40–46 min	Hungarian	
My Magic Closet	Romantic fantasy drama	July 20, 2023	August 9, 2023	1 season, 10 episodes	35–42 min	Korean; Portuguese	
The Accidental Influencer	Workplace comedy	February 10, 2024	March 16, 2024	1 season, 13 episodes	24–29 min	Mandarin	
MILF of Norway	Comedy	May 21, 2024 (Note: Europe); July 11, 2024	August 29, 2024	1 season, 8 episodes	26 min	Norwegian	
Portobello	Legal drama	February 20, 2026	March 27, 2026	6 episodes	56–71 min	Italian	

=== Unscripted ===
==== Docuseries ====
Title	Subject	Premiere	Finale	Seasons	Runtime	Language	Notes
Expecting Amy	Biography/Pregnancy	July 9, 2020		3 episodes	52–64 min	English	
Ravi Patel's Pursuit of Happiness	Lifestyle	August 27, 2020		1 season, 4 episodes	42 min	English	
Equal	LGBT rights	October 22, 2020		4 episodes	39–41 min	English	
Heaven's Gate: The Cult of Cults	True crime/Cults	December 3, 2020		4 episodes	49–52 min	English	
The Event	Food	January 14, 2021		1 season, 4 episodes	34–43 min	English	
Through Our Eyes	American society	July 22, 2021		1 season, 4 episodes	30–37 min	English	(Note: Moved to PBS for season 2.)
Generation Hustle	Business	April 22, 2021		1 season, 10 episodes	43–49 min	English	
The Way Down	Biography/Investigative journalism	September 30, 2021	April 28, 2022	5 episodes	47–55 min	English	
What Happened, Brittany Murphy?	Biography	October 14, 2021		2 episodes	56–57 min	English	
Dolores: The Truth About the Wanninkhof Case	True crime	October 26, 2021		1 season, 6 episodes	49–54 min	Spanish	
Take Out with Lisa Ling	Asian cuisine	January 27, 2022		1 season, 6 episodes	22–30 min	English	
Bilardo, the Soccer Doctor	Biography/Sports	February 24, 2022		1 season, 4 episodes	48–55 min	Spanish	
Gaming Wall Street	Business/Internet culture	March 3, 2022		2 episodes	54–59 min	English	
One Perfect Shot	Film industry	March 24, 2022		1 season, 6 episodes	22–26 min	English	
Brené Brown: Atlas of the Heart	Social influence	March 31, 2022		1 season, 5 episodes	36–47 min	English	
Czech It Out!	Travel	April 1, 2022	April 22, 2022	8 episodes	23–27 min	Czech	
Not So Pretty	Cosmetics industry/Investigative journalism	April 14, 2022		4 episodes	26–35 min	English	
PCC, Secret Power	True crime	May 26, 2022		4 episodes	46–51 min	Portuguese	
On My Way with Irina Rimes	Music	June 3, 2022		7 episodes	22–36 min	Romanian	
Menudo: Forever Young	Music	June 23, 2022		4 episodes	37–47 min	Spanish	
The Last Movie Stars	Celebrity	July 21, 2022		6 episodes	50–80 min	English	
A Brutal Pact: The Murder of Daniella Perez	True crime	July 21, 2022	August 4, 2022	5 episodes	56–60 min	Portuguese	
Saving the King	Investigative journalism/Politics	September 9, 2022		3 episodes	46–52 min	Spanish	
Low Country: The Murdaugh Dynasty	True crime	November 3, 2022		3 episodes	49–50 min	English	
Funny or Die's High Science (Note: Concurrently premiered on Discovery+ and HBO Max)	Comedy/Science	April 20, 2023		1 season, 5 episodes	24–26 min	English	
How to Create a Sex Scandal	Sex scandal	May 23, 2023		3 episodes	45 min	English	
SmartLess: On the Road	Comedy	May 23, 2023		6 episodes	42–51 min	English	
What Am I Eating? with Zooey Deschanel	Food	May 23, 2023		1 season, 6 episodes	24–27 min	English	
100 Years of Warner Bros.	Entertainment industry	May 25, 2023	June 1, 2023	4 episodes	53–60 min	English	
Naked.Loud.Proud	Drag/Burlesque	June 1, 2023		1 season, 5 episodes	31–40 min	Polish	
First Five	Politics	June 9, 2023		3 episodes	34–41 min	Finnish	
Shaun White: The Last Run	Sports	July 6, 2023		4 episodes	54–65 min	English	
Wanted: Millionaire	Finance/Investigative journalism	July 7, 2023		3 episodes	42–45 min	Spanish	
Project Greenlight: A New Generation	Filmmaking	July 13, 2023		1 season, 10 episodes	29–45 min	English	
Superpowered: The DC Story	Comic book industry	July 20, 2023		3 episodes	54–56 min	English	
Garavito: The Serial Beast	True crime	October 20, 2023		4 episodes	31–42 min	Spanish	
The Daughter of God: Dalma Maradona	Biography/Sports	October 26, 2023		3 episodes	45–47 min	Spanish	
The Lives of Fèlix	Biography	November 24, 2023		7 episodes	30–37 min	Spanish	
Chasing Flavor	Food	February 1, 2024		1 season, 6 episodes	29–36 min	English	
The Truth About Jim	True crime	February 15, 2024		4 episodes	45–50 min	English	
Menem Junior, The Death of a President's Son	True crime	February 29, 2024	March 14, 2024	4 episodes	42–48 min	Spanish	
Justice, USA	Incarceration	March 14, 2024	March 28, 2024	1 season, 6 episodes	50–56 min	English	
Massacre of the Mormons	True crime	April 11, 2024	April 18, 2024	4 episodes	35–42 min	Spanish	
Conan O'Brien Must Go	Travel	April 18, 2024	May 22, 2025	2 seasons, 7 episodes	39–47 min	English	(Note: Moved to HBO for season 3.)
Hell on Earth: The Verónica Case	True crime	May 21, 2024		3 episodes	44–47 min	Spanish	
Thirst with Shay Mitchell	Food/Travel	May 23, 2024	June 13, 2024	1 season, 4 episodes	38–46 min	English	
The King of Zanzibar	True crime	June 28, 2024; July 5, 2024		3 episodes	52–57 min	Polish	
Teen Torture Inc.	Troubled teen industry	July 11, 2024	July 18, 2024	3 episodes	45–50 min	English	
Taken Together: Who Killed Lyric and Elizabeth?	True crime	August 8, 2024		3 episodes	49–54 min	English	
The Sancho Case	True crime	October 18, 2024		3 episodes	55–71 min	English	
Skin Hunters	True crime	October 30, 2024	November 6, 2024	4 episodes	36–42 min	Polish	
Call Me Ted	Biography	November 13, 2024		6 episodes	38–65 min	English	
Breaking the Bank: One Trader, 50 Billion	True crime	November 28, 2024		4 episodes	42–48 min	French	
The Takedown: American Aryans	Politics/True crime	February 6, 2025		4 episodes	42 min	English	
How I Left the Opus Dei	Religion/True crime	February 7, 2025	February 14, 2025	4 episodes	45–54 min	Spanish	
Battle of Culiacán: Heirs of the Cartel	True crime	March 13, 2025	April 3, 2025	4 episodes	43 min	Spanish	
Super Sara	Entertainment industry	June 13, 2025	June 27, 2025	3 episodes	46 min	Spanish	
Now or Never – FC Montfermeil	Sports	June 20, 2025	July 18, 2025	5 episodes	34 min	French	
Most Wanted: Teen Hacker	True crime	September 5, 2025	September 26, 2025	4 episodes	41–45 min	Finnish	
Horses & Hangmen	True crime	August 29, 2025	September 19, 2025	4 episodes	41-43 min	Danish	
Who Killed Our Daughter?	True crime	September 18, 2025	October 9, 2025	4 episodes	42-49 min	Spanish	
Quiet in Class	True crime	September 29, 2025		3 episodes	39-44 min	Swedish	
The Vallecas Files	Paranormal	November 7, 2025	November 21, 2025	3 episodes	51-55 min	Spanish	
Surviving the Jehovah's Witnesses	Religion	February 20, 2026	March 6, 2026	3 episodes	46–48 min	Spanish	
Colosio: Political Assassination	True crime	March 19, 2026		3 episodes	46–53 min	Spanish	
The Topurias	Sports	June 5, 2026		3 episodes	46 min	Spanish	
Corregidora: The Darkest Night in Mexican Soccer	Sports/True crime	October 15, 2026		3 episodes	43–53 min	Spanish	
The Flores Massacre	True crime	October 22, 2026		3 episodes	45–46 min	Spanish	
Cannibal Poet	True crime	October 29, 2026		3 episodes	50–52 min	Spanish	
The Killing of the Golden Rooster	Music/True crime	November 12, 2026		3 episodes	44–46 min	Spanish	
Clangold	True crime	November 13, 2026		4 episodes	44–49 min	German	
Maniacs of the Truth	True crime	November 13, 2026		2 episodes	54–59 min	Hungarian	

==== Reality ====
Title	Genre	Premiere	Finale	Seasons	Runtime	Language	Notes
Craftopia	Reality competition	May 27, 2020	November 18, 2021	2 seasons, 20 episodes	25–33 min	English	
Legendary	Reality competition	May 27, 2020	June 9, 2022	3 seasons, 29 episodes	47–50 min	English	
Karma	Game show	June 18, 2020		1 season, 8 episodes	37–50 min	English	
Selena + Chef	Cooking show	August 13, 2020	September 1, 2022	4 seasons, 40 episodes	21–33 min	English	
Haute Dog	Reality competition	September 24, 2020	February 4, 2021	1 season, 12 episodes	28–29 min	English	
A World of Calm	Well-being	October 1, 2020		1 season, 10 episodes	22 min	English	
Full Bloom	Reality competition	November 12, 2020	July 1, 2021	2 season, 16 episodes	41–44 min	English	
12 Dates of Christmas	Dating show	November 26, 2020	November 25, 2021	2 seasons, 18 episodes	41–48 min	English	
Stylish with Jenna Lyons	Reality	December 3, 2020		1 season, 8 episodes	43–54 min	English	
House of Ho	Reality	December 10, 2020	September 8, 2022	2 seasons, 17 episodes	29–36 min	English	
Baketopia	Reality competition	March 25, 2021		1 season, 12 episodes	30 min	English	
Ellen's Next Great Designer	Reality competition	April 22, 2021	May 20, 2021	1 season, 6 episodes	44–45 min	English	
Wahl Street	Reality	April 15, 2021	October 6, 2022	2 seasons, 16 episodes	21–26 min	English	
The Big Shot with Bethenny	Reality competition	April 29, 2021	May 20, 2021	1 season, 7 episodes	38–44 min	English	
FBoy Island	Reality	July 29, 2021	August 4, 2022	2 seasons, 13 episodes	41–62 min	English	(Note: Moved to The CW for season 3.)
The Hype	Reality competition	August 12, 2021	October 6, 2022	2 seasons, 16 episodes	42–46 min	English	
Sweet Life: Los Angeles	Reality	August 19, 2021	August 18, 2022	2 seasons, 20 episodes	31–34 min	English	
The Cut	Reality competition	November 25, 2021; January 27, 2022		1 season, 8 episodes	42–49 min	Portuguese	
40 Means Nothing	Reality	December 2, 2021; February 3, 2022		1 season, 6 episodes	33–51 min	Spanish	
Finding Magic Mike	Reality competition	December 16, 2021		1 season, 7 episodes	39–46 min	English	
My Mom, Your Dad	Dating show	January 13, 2022		1 season, 8 episodes	29–46 min	English	
About Last Night	Game show	February 10, 2022		1 season, 8 episodes	22–27 min	English	
Queen Stars	Reality competition	March 24, 2022; April 7, 2022	April 14, 2022	1 season, 8 episodes	45–50 min	Portuguese	
One True Singer	Talent show	April 1, 2022	May 27, 2022	1 season, 10 episodes	58–97 min	Romanian	
The Bridge Brazil	Reality competition	June 9, 2022	June 23, 2022	1 season, 8 episodes	43–47 min	Portuguese	
The Big Brunch	Reality competition	November 10, 2022	November 24, 2022	1 season, 8 episodes	49–55 min	English	
The Climb	Reality competition	January 12, 2023	January 26, 2023	1 season, 8 episodes	38–51 min	English	
Swiping America	Dating show	June 15, 2023	June 29, 2023	1 season, 8 episodes	47–52 min	English	
Downey's Dream Cars	Reality	June 22, 2023	July 6, 2023	1 season, 6 episodes	42–52 min	English	
Time Zone	Reality competition	July 14, 2023		1 season, 8 episodes	52–60 min	Spanish	
Breaking New Ground	Reality	June 27, 2024	August 1, 2024	1 season, 6 episodes	44–48 min	English	
Coming from America	Reality	September 5, 2024	October 10, 2024	1 season, 6 episodes	41–46 min	English	
Roller Jam	Reality competition	October 10, 2024	November 14, 2024	1 season, 6 episodes	44–50 min	English	
Human vs Hamster	Reality competition	November 21, 2024		1 season, 8 episodes	38–44 min	English	
Second Chance Stage	Reality competition	November 28, 2024	December 19, 2024	1 season, 8 episodes	46–52 min	English	
Paul American	Reality	March 27, 2025	May 15, 2025	1 season, 8 episodes	41–42 min	English	
Back to the Frontier	Reality competition	July 10, 2025	August 28, 2025	1 season, 8 episodes	48–54 min	English	

==== Variety ====
Title	Genre	Premiere	Finale	Seasons	Runtime	Language	Notes
The Not-Too-Late Show with Elmo	Talk show	May 27, 2020	December 30, 2021	2 seasons, 29 episodes	14–16 min	English	
Astral Journey	Talk show	December 21, 2021; January 20, 2022		1 season, 12 episodes	36–41 min	Portuguese	
Fast Friends	Game show	December 19, 2024	January 9, 2025	1 season, 4 episodes	43 min	English	

=== Co-productions ===
Title	Genre	Partner/Country	Premiere	Finale	Seasons	Runtime	Language	Notes
Veneno	Biographical drama	Atresplayer Premium/Spain	November 19, 2020	December 10, 2020	8 episodes	45–63 min	Spanish	
The Bridge	Reality competition	Channel 4/United Kingdom	February 11, 2021	June 30, 2022	2 seasons, 14 episodes	38–48 min	English	
It's a Sin	Period drama	Channel 4/United Kingdom	February 18, 2021		5 episodes	46–48 min	English	
Starstruck	Comedy	BBC Three/United Kingdom	June 10, 2021	October 1, 2023	3 seasons, 18 episodes	20–26 min	English	
Sort Of	Sitcom	CBC Television/Canada	November 18, 2021	February 8, 2024	3 seasons, 24 episodes	21–22 min	English	
Perfect Life (season 2)	Comedy drama	Movistar+/Spain	December 2, 2021		1 season, 6 episodes	26–34 min	Spanish	
The Girl Before	Psychological thriller	BBC One/United Kingdom	February 10, 2022		4 episodes	55–58 min	English	
The Tourist (season 1)	Mystery thriller	BBC One/United Kingdom; Stan/Australia; ZDF/Germany	March 3, 2022		1 season, 6 episodes	55–58 min	English	(Note: Moved to Netflix from season 2 onward)
Theodosia (season 1)	Family fantasy adventure	Globoplay/Brazil; ZDF/Germany	March 10, 2022		1 season, 13 episodes	24–25 min	English	(Note: Season 2 was released on BYUtv.)
The Head (seasons 2–3)	Mystery thriller	Hulu Japan/Japan	December 22, 2022	January 23, 2025	2 seasons, 12 episodes	41–56 min	Danish; English; Swedish	
Two Sides of the Abyss	Thriller	RTL+/Germany	May 8, 2023	May 22, 2023	6 episodes	43–51 min	German	
Bea's Block	Family comedy	Sky Kids/United Kingdom	February 15, 2024	September 18, 2025	1 season, 20 episodes	24 min	English	
Home Sweet Rome!	Family musical comedy	ARD/Germany; BBC/United Kingdom; Family Channel/Canada; RAI/Italy	May 16, 2024	February 13, 2025	1 season, 13 episodes	25 min	English	
Belphégor	Thriller	M6/France	December 11, 2025		4 episodes	52 min	French	

=== Continuations ===
Title	Genre	Prev. network(s)	Premiere	Finale	Seasons	Runtime	Language	Notes
Summer Camp Island (seasons 2–5)	Animated fantasy comedy	Cartoon Network	June 18, 2020	December 9, 2021	4 seasons, 60 episodes	12 min	English	(Note: Moved to Cartoon Network for season 6.)
Doom Patrol (seasons 2–4)	Superhero comedy	DC Universe	June 25, 2020	November 9, 2023	3 seasons, 31 episodes (Note: Season 2 streamed concurrently on DC Universe and HBO Max. Season 3 streamed exclusively on HBO Max and Max.)	38–58 min	English	
Esme & Roy (season 2)	Animated fantasy comedy/Education	HBO	June 25, 2020	February 4, 2021	1 season, 26 episodes	24 min	English	
Search Party (seasons 3–5)	Satirical dark comedy	TBS	June 25, 2020	January 2, 2022	3 seasons, 30 episodes	20–30 min	English	
Infinity Train (seasons 3–4)	Animated science fantasy mystery	Cartoon Network	August 13, 2020	April 15, 2021	2 seasons, 20 episodes	12 min	English	
Sesame Street (seasons 51–55)	Education	NET (season 1); PBS (seasons 2–45); HBO Kids (seasons 46–50)	November 12, 2020	September 11, 2025	5 seasons, 175 episodes	26 min	English	(Note: Moved to Netflix for season 56.)
Titans (seasons 3–4)	Superhero drama	DC Universe	August 12, 2021	May 11, 2023	2 seasons, 25 episodes	40–56 min	English	
The Other Two (seasons 2–3)	Comedy	Comedy Central	August 26, 2021	June 29, 2023	2 seasons, 20 episodes	25–44 min	English	
Scooby-Doo and Guess Who? (season 2B)	Animated mystery comedy	Boomerang	October 1, 2021		1 season, 11 episodes	22 min	English	
Young Justice (season 4)	Animated superhero	Cartoon Network (seasons 1–2); DC Universe (season 3)	October 16, 2021	June 9, 2022	1 season, 26 episodes	21–25 min	English	
Gen:Lock (season 2)	Adult animated science fantasy	Rooster Teeth	November 4, 2021	December 23, 2021	1 season, 8 episodes	25–27 min	English	
South Side (seasons 2–3)	Black sitcom	Comedy Central	November 11, 2021	December 29, 2022	2 seasons, 18 episodes	27–33 min	English	
Beforeigners (season 2)	Science fiction crime drama	HBO Nordic	December 5, 2021 (Note: Nordic regions); December 23, 2021 (Note: North America)	January 27, 2022	1 season, 6 episodes	45 min	Norwegian; English	
Harley Quinn (seasons 3–5)	Adult animated superhero dark comedy	DC Universe	July 28, 2022	March 20, 2025	3 seasons, 31 episodes (Note: The Valentine's Day special is listed as part of season 3 in the United States. However, in selected regions it is listed as a standalone special, causing the total number of series episodes to differ between regions.)	22–44 min	English	
Pennyworth: The Origin of Batman's Butler (season 3)	Action crime thriller	Epix	October 6, 2022	November 24, 2022	1 season, 10 episodes	43–51 min	English	
Clone High (seasons 2–3)	Satirical science fiction sitcom	MTV	May 23, 2023	February 4, 2024	2 seasons, 20 episodes	24–28 min	English	
Kendra Sells Hollywood (season 2)	Reality	Discovery+	May 26, 2023	June 9, 2023	1 season, 6 episodes	24–29 min	English	
Warrior (season 3)	Martial arts action drama	Cinemax	June 29, 2023	August 17, 2023	1 season, 10 episodes	46–59 min	English; Cantonese	
Serving the Hamptons (season 2)	Reality	Discovery+	February 2, 2024		1 season, 6 episodes	30–42 min	English	
Selling the Hamptons (season 2)	Reality	Discovery+	March 1, 2024		1 season, 8 episodes	38–49 min	English	
Trixie Motel (season 2)	Reality	Discovery+	June 1, 2024	June 22, 2024	1 season, 4 episodes	44 min	English	
The Convict (season 4)	Crime drama	Player	June 11, 2024 (Note: Poland); August 1, 2024	August 1, 2024	1 season, 4 episodes	42–46 min	Polish	
Angel of Death (season 4)	Crime drama	Player	October 4, 2024	November 15, 2024	1 season, 7 episodes	42–44 min	Polish	

=== Specials ===
Title	Genre	Premiere	Runtime
Sesame Street Elmo's Playdate: Scavenger Hunt	Family comedy	August 6, 2020	25 min
Mo Willems and the Storytime All-Stars Present: Don't Let the Pigeon Do Storytime!	Family comedy	September 17, 2020	57 min
The Power of We: A Sesame Street Special	Family	October 15, 2020	22 min
A West Wing Special to Benefit When We All Vote	Reunion	October 15, 2020	1 hour, 4 min
The Monster at the End of This Story	Animated family comedy	October 29, 2020	31 min
The Fresh Prince of Bel-Air Reunion	Unscripted reunion	November 18, 2020	1 hour, 15 min
Friends: The Reunion	Unscripted reunion	May 27, 2021	1 hour, 44 min
Furry Friends Forever: Elmo Gets a Puppy	Animated family comedy	August 5, 2021	30 min
See Us Coming Together: A Sesame Street Special	Family comedy	November 25, 2021	24 min
And Just Like That... The Documentary	Making-of	February 3, 2022	1 hour, 13 min
Sesame Street The Nutcracker	Animated family comedy	December 1, 2022	26 min
Cookie Monster's Bake Sale	Family comedy	August 10, 2023	23 min
Oscar's Handmade Halloween	Family comedy	October 5, 2023	23 min
Peter & the Wolf	Animated fantasy adventure	October 19, 2023	33 min
Elmo and Tango Holiday Helpers	Family comedy	December 7, 2023	23 min
Cookie Monster's Bake Sale: Back to School	Family comedy	August 29, 2024	22 min
Cookie Monster's Bake Sale: Block Party	Family comedy	April 17, 2025	22 min
It: Welcome to Derry: "A Story of Derry"	Supernatural horror	October 31, 2026	30 min

=== Regional original programming ===
These shows are originals because HBO Max commissioned or acquired them and had their premiere on the service, but they are not available worldwide.

Title	Genre	Premiere	Seasons	Runtime	Exclusive region(s)	Language	Notes
The Missing	Crime drama	July 22, 2021; October 14, 2021	1 season, 10 episodes	41–49 min	Latin America and United States	Portuguese	
Love Spells (Amarres)	Romantic comedy drama	August 12, 2021; October 14, 2021	1 season, 10 episodes	44–51 min	Latin America and United States	Spanish	
Rap Battlefield	Coming-of-age music drama	September 16, 2021; November 4, 2021	2 seasons, 19 episodes	37–52 min	Latin America and United States	Spanish	
Before I Forget (Asesino del Olvido)	Crime drama	October 7, 2021	1 season, 10 episodes	45–54 min	Latin America	Spanish	
A Thousand Fangs	Military action drama	October 28, 2021; December 9, 2021	1 season, 7 episodes	44–54 min	Latin America and United States	Spanish	
Frankelda's Book of Spooks	Animated family horror anthology	October 29, 2021	1 season, 5 episodes	13–17 min	Latin America and United States	Spanish	
Juanpa + Chef	Cooking show	November 11, 2021; March 10, 2022	1 season, 6 episodes	29 min	Latin America and United States	Spanish	
Sandy + Chef	Cooking show	November 11, 2021; March 10, 2022	1 season, 6 episodes	29 min	Latin America and United States	Portuguese	
Vote for Juan	Political satire	November 28, 2021	1 season, 8 episodes	26–36 min	Latin America, Spain and United States	Spanish	
Búnker	Action comedy	December 23, 2021; January 27, 2022	1 season, 8 episodes	29–31 min	Latin America and United States	Spanish	
Sin novedad	Comedy	December 19, 2021	6 episodes	23–25 min	Spain	Spanish	
Onda Boa com Ivete	Music docuseries	January 20, 2022	1 season, 5 episodes	32–38 min	Brazil and Latin America	Portuguese	
How to Screw It All Up	Teen drama	July 1, 2022	1 season, 6 episodes	16–23 min	Latin America and United States	Spanish	
Divina Comida México	Reality	October 27, 2022	3 seasons, 44 episodes	34–47 min	Latin America	Spanish	
Osel	Biography/Religion docuseries	November 3, 2022	4 episodes	43–49 min	Spain	Spanish	
The Bridge Hungary	Reality competition	August 11, 2023	1 season, 7 episodes	49–54 min	Czechia, Hungary and Slovakia	Hungarian	
Naked Attraction Spain	Reality competition	May 21, 2024	1 season, 7 episodes	46–48 min	Italy, Portugal and Spain	Spanish	
Romário: The One	Biography/Sports	May 23, 2024	6 episodes	42–48 min	Latin America	Spanish	
Astronauta	Adult animation	October 18, 2024	6 episodes	24 min	Portuguese	Brazil	
Pekín Express (season 7)	Reality competition	October 20, 2024	1 season, 9 episodes	58–66 min	Spanish	Portugal and Spain	
Naked and Afraid: Spain	Reality	January 12, 2025	1 season, 7 episodes	45–49 min	Spanish	Portugal and Spain	
Pubertat	Drama	September 24, 2025	6 episodes	42–52 min	Catalan	Portugal and Spain	
The Laura Stern Affair	Drama	January 22, 2026	4 episodes	47–64 min	French	Belgium and France	
The Lollobrigida Affair	True crime	April 3, 2026	3 episodes	48–60 min	Italian	Europe	
Ravalear: Not for Sale	Drama	May 22, 2026	6 episodes	46–54 min	Catalan	Portugal and Spain	
Death and Mystery in the Amazon	True crime docuseries	September 10, 2026	3 episodes	51–59 min	Brazil and Latin America	Portuguese	
