= Selena + Chef =

2020 unscripted television series starring Selena Gomez

- Genre: Cooking show
- Developed by: Aaron Saidman
- Presented by: Selena Gomez
- Country of origin: United States
- Original language: English
- No. of seasons: 4
- No. of episodes: 44

Production
- Executive producers: Eli Holzman; Aaron Saidman; Selena Gomez; Leah Hariton; Melissa Stokes
- Running time: 22–33 minutes
- Production companies: The Intellectual Property Corporation; July Moon Productions

Original release
- Network: HBO Max
- Release: August 13, 2020 – September 1, 2022
- Network: Food Network
- Release: November 30 – December 21, 2023

Selena + Chef is an American television cooking show hosted by Selena Gomez that premiered on HBO Max on August 13, 2020. The first season consists of 10 episodes. In August 2020, the series was renewed for a second season, which premiered on November 19, 2020, and continues into early 2021. In April 2021, the series was renewed for a third season which was released on October 28, 2021. In November 2021, the series was renewed for a fourth season which premiered on August 18, 2022. On October 2, 2023, it was announced that Gomez would return for a series of holiday specials entitled Selena + Chef: Home for the Holidays that premiered on November 30, 2023 on Food Network.

== Premise ==
Selena Gomez stars in a cooking series filmed in her home. Each episode features Selena tackling a new cuisine and guest stars a different professional chef, where they cover tips and tricks and how to deal with disasters in the kitchen. For each episode, the show donates $10,000 to the charity of the Chef's choice, often food related. In 2021, over two seasons of the show, $360,000 was raised for nonprofit organizations.

The fourth season of this cooking show was filmed in Malibu in the house from the Hannah Montana series where the main character lived.

== Cast ==
Selena Gomez stars as the host of the series. Confirmed guests for the first season include:

- Ludo Lefebvre
- Antonia Lofaso
- Candice Kumai
- Roy Choi
- Jon Shook
- Vinny Dotolo
- Nancy Silverton
- Angelo Sosa
- Tanya Holland
- Daniel Holzman
- Nyesha Arrington

Confirmed guests for the second season include:

- Curtis Stone
- JJ Johnson
- José Andrés
- Marcus Samuelsson
- Kelis Rogers
- Jordan Andino
- Marcela Valladolid
- Evan Funke
- Graham Elliot
- Aarti Sequeira

Confirmed guests for the third season include:

- Kwame Onwuachi
- Ayesha Curry
- Aarón Sánchez
- Fabio Viviani
- Richard Blais
- Padma Lakshmi
- Esther Choi
- Sophia Roe
- Gabe Kennedy
- Jamie Oliver

Confirmed guests for the fourth season include:

- Ludo Lefebvre
- Kristen Kish
- DeVonn Francis
- Rachael Ray
- Nick DiGiovanni
- Adrienne Cheatham
- Matty Matheson
- Priya Krishna
- Paola Velez
- Gordon Ramsay

=== Special guests ===
- Nana Cornett
- Papa Cornett
- Liz Golden
- Raquelle Stevens
- Theresa Mingus
- Paige Reed
- Fox Martindale (season 3)
- Gracie Elliot Teefey (season 3–present)
- Anna Collins (season 3)
- Kelsey Klingensmith (season 4)
- Connar Franklin (season 4)
- Ashley Cook (season 4)

== Episodes ==
=== Series overview ===
Season	Episodes	Originally released		
Season	Episodes	First released	Last released	Network
1	10	August 13, 2020	August 27, 2020	HBO Max
2	10	November 19, 2020	February 4, 2021	HBO Max
3	10	October 28, 2021	November 11, 2021	HBO Max
4	10	August 18, 2022	September 1, 2022	HBO Max
Special	4	November 30, 2023	December 21, 2023	Food Network

=== Season 1 (2020) ===
No. overall	No. in season	Title	Original release date
1	1	"Selena + Ludo Lefebvre"	August 13, 2020
French chef Ludo Lefebvre teaches Selena how to make his "French Omelette" and "Cheese Soufflé".
2	2	"Selena + Antonia Lofaso"	August 13, 2020
Antonia Lofaso teaches Selena how to make her "Seafood Tostada".
3	3	"Selena + Candice Kumai"	August 13, 2020
Candice Kumai teaches Selena how to make her "Spicy Miso Ramen" and "Matcha Chocolate Chip Cookies".
4	4	"Selena + Roy Choi"	August 20, 2020
Roy Choi teaches Selena how to make his "Korean BBQ Short Rib Breakfast Tacos" and "Hawaiian Malasadas". American singer-songwriter Taylor Swift makes an appearance in the episode, through FaceTime.
5	5	"Selena + Jon and Vinny"	August 20, 2020
Chef duo Jon and Vinny teach Selena how to make their "Chicken Dinner" and "Bruschetta".
6	6	"Selena + Nancy Silverton"	August 20, 2020
Nancy Silverton teaches Selena how to make her "Italian Party Buffet".
7	7	"Selena + Angelo Sosa"	August 27, 2020
Angelo Sosa teaches Selena how to make his "Guacamole 101" and "Baja Style Fried Rice"
8	8	"Selena + Tanya Holland"	August 27, 2020
Tanya Holland teaches Selena how to make her "Buttermilk Fried Chicken" and "Bacon, Cheddar and Scallion Biscuits".
9	9	"Selena + Daniel Holzman"	August 27, 2020
Daniel Holzman teaches Selena how to make his "Chicken Meatballs and Gnocchi".
10	10	"Selena + Nyesha Arrington"	August 27, 2020
Nyesha Arrington teaches Selena how to make her "Branzino with Spiced Tomato-Coconut Sauce" and "Dog Biscuits and Glaze".

=== Season 2 (2020–21) ===
No. overall	No. in season	Title	Original release date
11	1	"Selena + Curtis Stone"	January 21, 2021
Curtis Stone teaches Selena how to make "Steak Sandwiches with Caramelized Onions & Cheddar", "Salt & Vinegar Potato Chips", and "Key Lime Parfaits".
12	2	"Selena + JJ Johnson"	January 21, 2021
JJ Johnson teaches Selena how to make "Seafood Gumbo", "Gumbo Spice Mix", and "Jasmine Rice".
13	3	"Selena + José Andrés"	January 21, 2021
José Andrés shows Selena how to make a tapas feast, including "Tichi's Gazpacho", "New Way Omelet", "Mussels A La Galega", "Gambas al ajillo", and "Pan Con Tomate".
14	4	"Selena + Marcus Samuelsson"	January 28, 2021
Marcus Samuelsson shows Selena how to make "Honey Mustard Glazed Salmon Radicchio Bulgur Salad" and "Miso Broth".
15	5	"Selena + Kelis Rogers"	January 28, 2021
Kelis Rogers shows Selena how to make "Oxtail Poutine with Yuca & Fresh Farm Herbs" and a "Rosemary Apple Cranberry Buckle".
16	6	"Selena + Jordan Andino"	January 28, 2021
Jordan Andino shows Selena how to make "Chicken Adobo with Jasmine Rice" and "Jackfruit & Plantain Turon".
17	7	"Selena + Marcela Valladolid"	February 4, 2021
Marcela Valladolid shows Selena how to make "Shredded Chicken Mole Tacos" and "Cinnamon Sugar Dusted Buñuelos".
18	8	"Selena + Evan Funke"	February 4, 2021
Evan Funke teaches Selena how to make "Ragù Bolognese", "Tagliatelle Ragù Bolognese", and "Fresh Tagliatelle".
19	9	"Selena + Graham Elliot"	February 4, 2021
Graham Elliot shows Selena how to make "Graham's Burger" and "Signature Caesar Salad".
20	10	"Selena + Aarti Sequeira: Friendsgiving"	November 19, 2020
Aarti Sequeira teaches Selena how to make "Tandoori Masala Turkey Breast" and "Cheater Masala Gravy", "Garam Masala Spiced Sweet Potatoes with Toasted Marshmallows", "Cranberry Chutney", and "Haricot Vert with Roasted Pistachios and Fresh Mint".

=== Season 3 (2021) ===
No. overall	No. in season	Title	Original release date
21	1	"Selena + Kwame Onwuachi"	October 28, 2021
Kwame Onwuachi teaches Selena how to make "Jollof Rice with Chicken in Red Stew & Fried Plantains".
22	2	"Selena + Ayesha Curry"	October 28, 2021
Ayesha Curry teaches Selena how to make "Sweet Chili Chickpeas", "Hot Honey Chicken Sandwich", and "Gorgonzola Stuffed Dates".
23	3	"Selena + Aarón Sánchez"	October 28, 2021
Aarón Sánchez teaches Selena how to make "Lobster Mango Ceviche", "Poached Shrimp", "Crab Ravigote", and "Salsa Verde & Roasted Tomatillo Salsa".
24	4	"Selena + Fabio Viviani"	November 4, 2021
Fabio Viviani teaches Selena how to make "Pan Tomato Basil Pizza & Rosemary Focaccia" and "Tomato Jam & Burrata with Toasted Bread".
25	5	"Selena + Richard Blais"	November 4, 2021
Richard Blais teaches Selena how to make a "DIY Nacho Bar" and a "DIY Ice Cream Bar" (with Liquid Nitrogen Ice Cream).
26	6	"Selena + Padma Lakshmi"	November 4, 2021
Padma Lakshmi teaches Selena how to make "Sweet & Sour Shrimp with Cherry Tomatoes", "Coconut Rice", and "Homemade Masala Chai".
27	7	"Selena + Esther Choi"	November 11, 2021
Esther Choi teaches Selena how to make "Kimchi Animal Sauce", "Apple Ssamjang", "Cucumber Kimchi", "Marinated Short Ribs & Spicy Pork", "Bouquet of Lettuces & Mixed Mushrooms", and "Corn Cheese & Egg Soufflé".
28	8	"Selena + Sophia Roe"	November 11, 2021
Sophia Roe teaches Selena how to make "Tofu Ground Beef Lettuce Wrap", "Mushroom Meatballs", and "Sweet Potato Salad".
29	9	"Selena + Gabe Kennedy"	November 11, 2021
Gabe Kennedy teaches Selena how to make "Black Cod en Papillote" and "Basque Cheesecake with Figs".
30	10	"Selena + Jamie Oliver"	November 11, 2021
Jamie Oliver teaches Selena how to make "Dukkah Roast Chicken", "Perfect Roast Potatoes", "Greens", and "Eton Mess".

=== Season 4 (2022) ===
No. overall	No. in season	Title	Original release date
31	1	"Selena + Ludo Lefebvre"	August 18, 2022
Ludo Lefebvre is back and teaches Selena how to make "Whole Grilled Sole with Burnt Tomato & Sorrel" and "Grilled Pineapple with Spicy Banana Caramel".
32	2	"Selena + Kristen Kish"	August 18, 2022
Kristen Kish teaches Selena how to make "Chickpea Fried Broccoli & Cheese", "Mexican Street Corn & Baby Carrots" and "Strawberry & Yuzu Dessert".
33	3	"Selena + DeVonn Francis"	August 18, 2022
DeVonn Francis teaches Selena how to make "Banana Leaf Roasted Snapper" and "Torched Banana Cake".
34	4	"Selena + Rachael Ray"	August 25, 2022
35	5	"Selena + Nick DiGiovanni"	August 25, 2022
36	6	"Selena + Adrienne Cheatham"	August 25, 2022
37	7	"Selena + Matty Matheson"	September 1, 2022
38	8	"Selena + Priya Krishna"	September 1, 2022
39	9	"Selena + Paola Velez"	September 1, 2022
40	10	"Selena + Gordon Ramsay"	September 1, 2022

=== Home for the Holidays (2023) ===
No. overall	No. in season	Title	Original release date
41	1	"Selena + Alex"	November 30, 2023
42	2	"Selena + Michael"	December 7, 2023
43	3	"Selena + Claudette"	December 14, 2023
44	4	"Selena + Eric"	December 21, 2023

== Production and spin-off ==
On May 1, 2020, HBO Max gave a greenlight for 10-episode cooking series hosted by Selena Gomez, and developed by Aaron Saidman. Gomez executive produced the series alongside Eli Holzman, Leah Hariton, and Saidman. The series concept was inspired by Gomez's own experience and struggles with cooking for herself while in quarantine, and the producers were committed to documenting this in a way that was "unrehearsed, unfiltered and truly unscripted." On August 27, 2020, HBO Max renewed the series for a second season. On April 23, 2021, HBO Max renewed the series for a third season. On November 10, 2021, HBO Max renewed the series for a fourth season.

Filmed during the COVID-19 pandemic, strict safety protocols were followed, with no crew members ever present in Gomez's kitchen. The chefs featured in each episode appear remotely.

In May 2023, following the merger of HBO Max parent company WarnerMedia with Food Network owner Discovery, Inc., forming Warner Bros. Discovery, Food Network announced two new then-untitled projects hosted by Gomez, leaving the fate of Selena + Chef unclear.

In October 2023, it was announced that the first of the aforementioned Food Network projects, a four-part holiday special, would be branded as an extension of the Max (formerly HBO Max) series as Selena + Chef: Home for the Holidays. These specials premiered on November 30, 2023.

A spin-off, entitled Selena + Restaurant, premiered on May 2, 2024 on Food Network and follows Gomez as she attempts to create an original dish worthy of being on the restaurant's menu.

== Release ==
The series premiered on August 13, 2020, on HBO Max. The second season premiered on November 19, 2020, and continued with more episodes on January 21, 2021. The third season was released on October 28, 2021. The fourth season was released on August 18, 2022, with the first three episodes available, followed by three more episodes each on August 25, and then the final four episodes on September 1, 2022.

== Reception ==
=== Critical response ===
For the first season, review aggregator Rotten Tomatoes reported an approval rating of 100% based on 5 critic reviews, with an average rating of 6/10.

=== Awards and nominations ===
Accolades received by Selena Chef
Award	Year	Category	Recipient(s)	Result	Ref.
American Reality Television Awards	2023	Reality Royalty Award	Selena Gomez	Won	
Clio Awards	2021	Bronze Award for Lifestyle	Selena + Chef - Trailer	Won	
Critics' Choice Real TV Awards	2022	Female Star of the Year	Selena Gomez	Won	
Critics' Choice Real TV Awards	2023	Best Culinary Show	Selena + Chef	Nominated	
Critics' Choice Real TV Awards	2023	Star of the Year	Selena Gomez	Nominated	
Critics' Choice Real TV Awards	2023	Best Show Host	Selena Gomez	Nominated	
Daytime Emmy Awards	2023	Outstanding Culinary Series	Leah Hariton, Eli Holzman, Aaron Saidman, Melissa Stokes, Selena Gomez, Julia Valdes, Caylie Dunnam, Jaclyn Fasano, Vince Acosta, Kevin Mendonca, Sterling Frymer, Jamie Lauren, Megan Potthoff	Nominated	
Daytime Emmy Awards	2024	Outstanding Culinary Series	Selena Gomez, Eli Holzman, Shauna Minoprio, Aaron Saidman, Melissa Stokes, Chris Kosfeld, Kevin Mendonca, Rich Brusa, Megan Potthoff, Sterling Frymer	Nominated	
Hollywood Critics Association TV Awards	2021	Best Cable or Streaming Reality Series, Competition Series, or Game Show	Selena + Chef	Nominated	
Hollywood Critics Association TV Awards	2022	Best Streaming Reality Show or Competition Series	Selena + Chef	Nominated	
Astra Creative Arts TV Awards	2023	Best Streaming Reality or Competition Series	Selena + Chef	Nominated	
Hollywood Professional Association Awards	2022	Outstanding Editing: Documentary/Nonfiction – Episode or Non-Theatrical Feature (for "Selena + Kwame Onwuachi")	James Ciccarello, Blake Maddox	Nominated	
MTV Movie & TV Awards	2021	Best New Unscripted Series	Selena + Chef	Won	
MTV Movie & TV Awards	2022	Best Lifestyle Show	Selena + Chef	Won	
Realscreen Awards	2022	Reality - Structured Reality	Eli Holzman, Aaron Saidman, Selena Gomez, Leah Hariton, Melissa Stokes	Nominated	
Realscreen Awards	2022	Lifestyle - Studio-Based Food Program	Eli Holzman, Aaron Saidman, Selena Gomez, Leah Hariton, Melissa Stokes	Won	
Realscreen Awards	2023	Lifestyle - Studio-based Food Program	Aaron Saidman, Eli Holzman, Selena Gomez, Leah Hariton, Melissa Stokes, Julia Valdes	Won	
Realscreen Awards	2024	Lifestyle - Studio-based Food Program	Aaron Saidman, Eli Holzman, Selena Gomez, Leah Hariton, Melissa Stokes	Won	

== International versions ==
Country/Region	Title	Network(s)	Host(s)	Date premiered
Brazil	Sandy + Chef	HBO Max	Sandy	November 11, 2021
Mexico	Juanpa + Chef	HBO Max	Juanpa Zurita	November 11, 2021
Thailand	MarkKim + Chef	HBO Asia	Mark Prin; Kimberley Anne Woltemas	August 18, 2023
