= Murder of Rocío Wanninkhof =

1999 Spanish murder and miscarriage of justice case

- Photo of Wanninkhof in 1999
- Location: Mijas, Málaga, Spain
- Date: 9 October 1999
- Attack type: Murder
- Weapon: Knife
- Deaths: 1
- Perpetrator: Tony Alexander King
- Charges: Murder
- Verdict: Guilty
- Sentence: 19 years in prison

The murder of Rocío Wanninkhof occurred on 9 October 1999. Wanninkhof, a 19-year-old Dutch-Spanish woman, disappeared in Mijas, Málaga, Spain, a town located on the Costa del Sol. Three weeks later, Wanninkhof's stabbed and partially decomposed body was found. Amidst popular pressure and a media circus characterized at times as a "public lynching" of the accused, a jury trial convicted 52-year-old María Dolores "Loli" Vázquez, the ex-girlfriend of Wanninkhof's mother Alicia Hornos, for the murder, even though there was no evidence relating her to the crime. This miscarriage of justice has been blamed on prejudices about Vázquez's homosexuality and the fabrication of an unsubstantiated narrative about her being a "dominant", "predatory" lesbian. Others have also cited malinterpretations of Vázquez's behaviour due to her Galician extraction and traditional British comportment, being dissonant with local social norms, attitudes and expectations.

Three months after Vázquez's conviction, the High Court of Andalusia overturned the sentence and ordered a new trial. In August 2003, Sonia Carabantes, a 17-year-old girl from Coín disappeared and was found murdered. The DNA found at the scene of the Carabantes murder, revealed that she and Wanninkhof were murdered by the same perpetrator. All charges against Vázquez were dropped when both DNA were matched to Tony Alexander King, a 32-year-old British sex offender with a long criminal history in the United Kingdom. King was convicted of both murders and sentenced to 55 years in prison.

The affair is popularly known in Spain as the Wanninkhof Case (Caso Wanninkhof) or Wanninkhof-Carabantes Case (Caso Wanninkhof-Carabantes). Vázquez's conviction has been named as the biggest miscarriage of justice in the judiciary history of Spain since the 1910 "Crime of Cuenca".

== Background ==
=== Rocío Wanninkhof ===
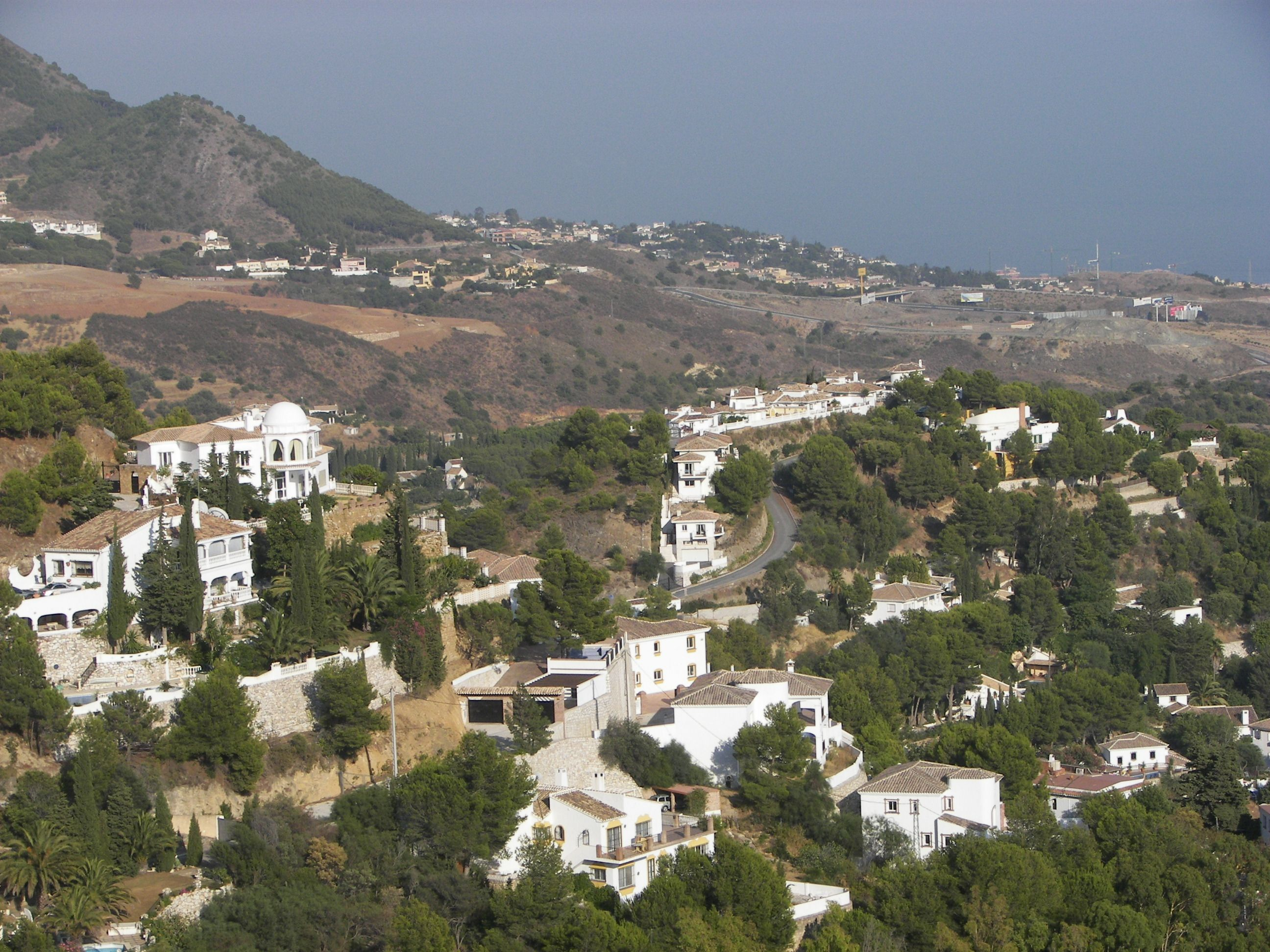
View of Mijas from Benalmádena

Rocío Wanninkhof Hornos was born on 9 November 1979 to Willem "Guillermo" Wanninkhof, a Dutch citizen, and his Spanish wife Hilaria Alicia Hornos (known as Alicia), a native of Arroyo del Ojanco in rural Jaén province. Rocío had a sister and a brother. Hornos began her relationship with Vázquez in 1982, while she was still married. The following year, Hornos left her husband – who returned to the Netherlands – and moved into Vázquez's residence in Mijas, Màlaga province. The two purchased a house together, although Vázquez was named as the sole proprietor in the contract.

After her divorce in 1983, Hornos kept legal custody of the children and she raised them with Vázquez as the couple's own. Rocío and her sister Rosa said that they had two mothers at their school, and signed several times with the surnames "Vázquez Hornos" in place of their legal name, Wanninkhof Hornos. Such was the case of Rocío's own personal diaries. Rosa also claimed that her own relationship with Vázquez was one of "affection," even at the height of the media frenzy incriminating Vázquez.

Though Hornos and Vázquez ended their relationship in 1988, they continued to live together for a while and generally remained on good terms until around 1994. The cause of their enmity may have been a dispute over the ownership of the house and other properties, according to Hornos's sister-in-law. Hornos continued to reside in Mijas with her children, and later began a new relationship with a Spanish man, Juan Cerrillo, that was ongoing at the time of Rocío's murder and Vázquez's trial.

=== Tony Alexander King ===
Tony Alexander King
- Born: Anthony Bromwich; 2 August 1967 (age 59); United Kingdom
- Other names: Tony Bromwich; The Holloway Strangler; The Costa Killer
- Convictions: Murder (x2); Rape; Kidnapping
- Penalty: 55 years in prision

Details
- Victims: 2 (plus 13+ non-fatal attacks)
- Span of crimes: 1986–2003
- Country: United Kingdom; Spain
- States: Holloway, London; Costa del Sol, Málaga
- Date apprehended: 18 September 2003

Tony Alexander King was born Anthony Bromwich on 2 August 1967. He claimed he was physically abused by his older brother as a child. In 1986, when he was 19, he was sentenced to ten years in a detention centre for young delinquents for the non-fatal strangulation and sexual assault of five women in the London district of Holloway. King, who always attacked on Monday and Wednesday because he was with his fiancée on the other days, never penetrated his victims because he was sexually impotent. One victim was thrown against the pavement during the attack, resulting in the fracture of her nose and jaw. He was released in 1991 from HM Prison Grendon, where he had undergone therapy to 'address' his offending behaviour, after serving only half of his sentence.

However, King was rearrested six months later for robbing a woman at gunpoint. King was then recluded in regular prison until 1996. Shortly after his release he changed his name, which is allowed to people convicted in cases of great public notoriety in the United Kingdom. The same year, King married Chilean-born Cecilia Matilde Pantoja when she was two months pregnant with their daughter, Sabrina. He told Pantoja that he had a criminal record for armed robbery, but claimed that he had been forced into it because of poverty.

In August 1997, King threatened a Hungarian woman with a knife and attempted to rape her in Leatherhead railway station. The attack was recorded by a CCTV camera; after the film was broadcast on BBC One's Crimewatch on 2 September, Scotland Yard received numerous calls from viewers who identified the attacker as King. An order of arrest was issued the next day, but King and Pantoja had already fled to Málaga and found refuge in its large British expatriate community. Six months later, British police located King in Mijas, where he was working as a real estate agent, and requested him to return voluntarily to the UK. When he refused, they informed Spain's Ministry of the Interior of King's presence in Málaga, but this notice was labelled "low risk" and was not accompanied by a petition of arrest and extradition. Hornos worked in King's firm as a maid, but they never interacted.

Pantoja (who continued to use her surname, as per Spanish and Latin American custom) abandoned him in 2000, citing economic problems and her own fear that he was involved in Rocío Wanninkhof's murder. However, she didn't report her suspicions to the police and they were reported to have remained in contact and on good terms with other people. In 2001, King began to work in a local English pub called "Chicken Shack," where he became friends with a co-worker named Simon Bowers. Bowers later moved to Alhaurín el Grande and opened his own bar there, "The Bowers Arms," employing King as a cook, waiter and bouncer. While working there, King met a local school janitor, Mariluz Gallego, and he moved in with her and her three children. The home they lived in was inside the school and next to a Spanish Civil Guard station. However, King only interacted with the officers once in 2001, when he was questioned for poaching rabbits.

Following King's arrest in 2003, the British tabloid newspapers News of the World and The Sun claimed that British police were investigating King as a suspect in twelve unsolved murders of women in the UK that had taken place between 1987 and 1994. Scotland Yard dismissed this information as "pure speculation". However, it was later announced that King would be interrogated as a suspect in the 2002 murder of Milly Dowler. He was also investigated for his possible connection to the disappearance of María Teresa Fernández, an 18-year-old girl who disappeared in Motril, Granada, on 18 August 2000.

== Murder ==
=== Disappearance ===
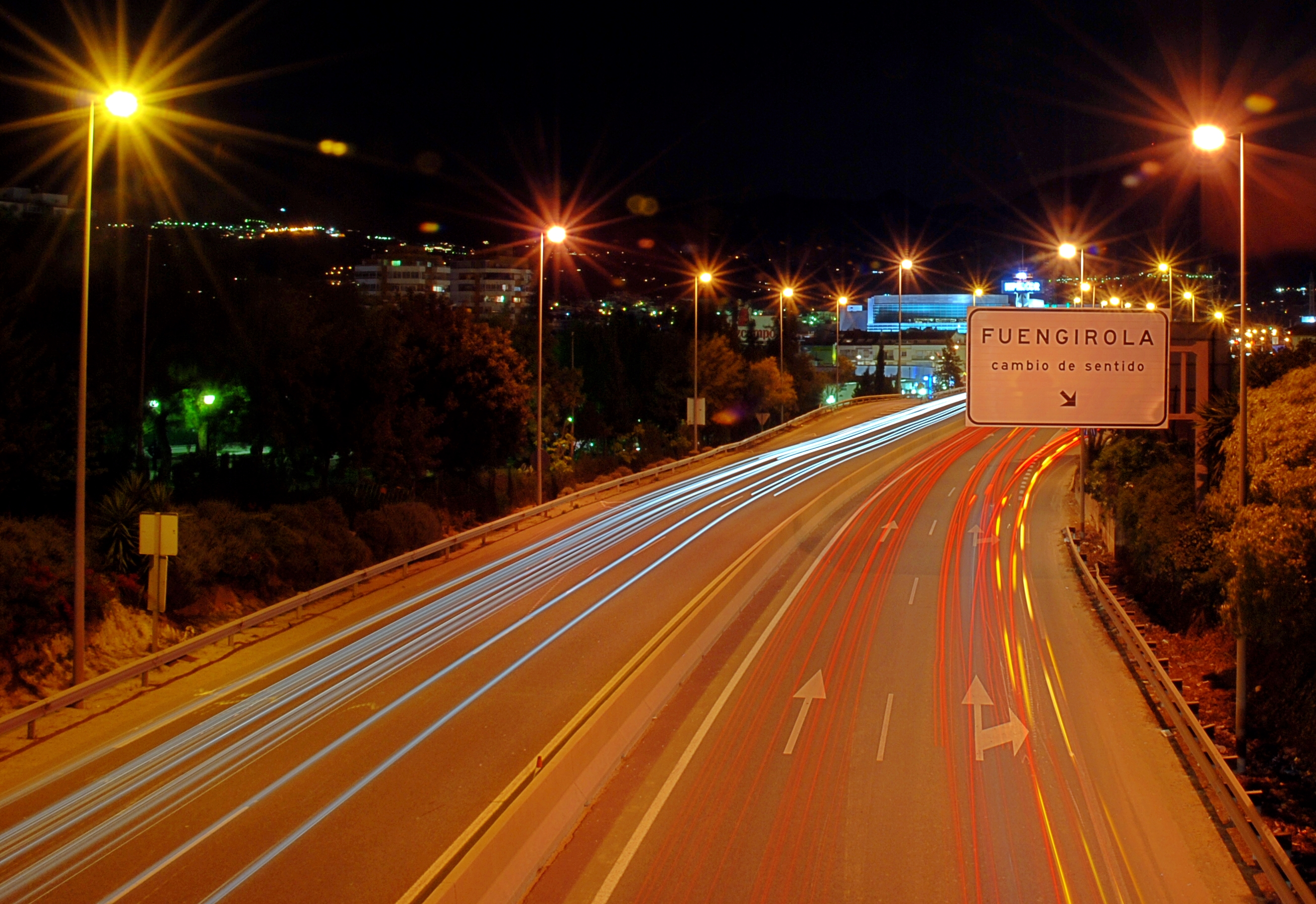
Road to Fuengirola at night

Rocío Wanninkhof said goodbye to her mother and sister around 17:30 on 9 October 1999. She walked the 500 metres between her home in the Mijas residential area "La Cortijera" and her boyfriend's home in La Cala de Mijas, where she stayed until 21:30. According to her boyfriend, she left then with the intention of taking a shower and changing clothes in her home, before reuniting with him and other friends at a fair in Fuengirola later that night. This was the first and only time that Wanninkhof made the return trip alone and on foot; usually, she would either be driven home by her boyfriend or picked up at his home by her mother or sister. A foreign resident who died before Vázquez's trial was the last person to see her alive, walking from La Cala to Mijas.

Wanninkhof's mother and sister contacted her boyfriend and friends the next day, all of whom denied having seen her at the fair. Though already alarmed, Hornos decided to go for a walk with Cerrillo to put herself at ease rather than reporting Wanninkhof's disappearance right away. During this walk, the couple found a pair of running shoes that they identified as Wanninkhof's, a napkin, and several blood stains in a vacant lot next to the road used by her. They alerted the Civil Guard, who cordoned off the area and started the search with the help of her family and over one thousand neighbours. Despite the absence of a body, it was immediately apparent to law enforcement that Wanninkhof had been murdered. A blood trail began at 1.10 meters from the sidewalk and continued to a blood pool large enough to have caused her death from exsanguination. Next to the pool were dragging marks, and crossing over them and the blood, there were tyre tracks made by a small vehicle with a tyre model that went out of production in 1993. Because the dragging marks continued over severely inclined terrain that would have made it difficult for one person to drag a body alone, it was believed that the body was dragged by at least two people, then left in a less exposed area of the vacant lot before the vehicle was brought in to transport the body to another location.

"Three or four days" after the disappearance, a taxi driver came forward to say that the night of the crime, at 22:00, he dodged an off-road vehicle driving on the wrong lane at the exact point on the road where the running shoes were found. When the vehicle passed his own, he heard a high-pitched "shriek or scream" that scared him. On 16 October, DNA testing confirmed that the blood belonged to Wanninkhof.

Despite the evidence, the family and friends of Wanninkhof stated that they believed she was still alive. Cliff Stanford and Sylvia Spruck Wrigley, who had employed her as an au pair for Wrigley's five-year-old child, offered a reward of ten million pesetas (£40,000) for any useful information about her disappearance Later, Stanford increased that to twenty-five million pesetas (£100,000) for information that could lead to the arrest of her killer.

=== Discovery of the body ===
Wanninkhof's nude body was found on 2 November near the sporting club "Los Altos del Rodeo," between Marbella and San Pedro de Alcántara. It was disfigured, stabbed nine times, partially mummified and skeletonized. The advanced state of decomposition, only three weeks after the disappearance, raised doubts about its identity. This was attributed successively to carbonization, acid corrosion and flesh-eating wasps. However, Wanninkhof's sister recognized some rings, two T-shirts and other objects found in two trash bags near the body as belonging to Rocío. The T-shirts were torn by the stabs, and no clothes from the waist down were ever found. The autopsy confirmed that it was indeed Wanninkhof's body, and also revealed that she had been beaten first, then stabbed once in the left section of the chest, likely when she tried to flee. This stab was the most damaging, as it affected several organs and pulmonary arteries. As a result, Wanninkhof became instantly paralyzed or unconscious, and her death was quick. Once on the ground, she was stabbed eight more times in a small area of the back, in quick succession, with the likely aim of ensuring her death. The wounds were all caused by the same weapon: a thin, single-edged razor. Sexual assault could not be proven either way, due to the advanced decomposition of the body. The body was left on the ground for several hours before the killer returned and put it in the car and was later deposited, not thrown, in the second location. It was partially covered by bushes and fallen leaves when it was found.

Because a number eight was drawn on one of the bags, it was believed that the bags were not acquired with the intention of using them in a murder, but that they had been repurposed after being already used. The killer was also believed to be familiar with the area where the body was abandoned, as it was only accessible by a trail perpendicular to the N-340 highway, which was very difficult to see from the road.

== Trial of Dolores Vázquez ==
The trial was by jury, which is a system with no tradition in Spain, having been newly implemented. Most factual evidence exculpated her but the prosecutor relied heavily in attacking the character of Dolores and her lesbian relationship with Rocío's mother Alicia. The verdict repeated word for word the prosecutor's allegations and found Dolores guilty of the murder of Rocío. She was sentenced to serve 15 years in prison. All this was conducted in the middle of a media circus and public pressure.

Dolores appealed and the higher court agreed and declared the case should be retried.

== Murder of Sonia Carabantes ==
Undated photo of Carabantes

On 14 August 2003, 17-year-old Sonia Carabantes (born 15 May 1986) was reported missing in Coin, Malaga. Her mother, Encarna Guzmán, found her daughter's sandals, purse and phone in a street, next to a large blood stain. Her disappearance quickly became subject of media interest, the search to find Carabantes was extensive with more than 700 volunteers, with helicopter and a caving team. The circumstances of Carabantes' disappearance were very similar to Wanninkhof's. Both were young girls who went missing near their homes after attending or planning to attend, a town fair. The case received extensive media and press coverage before and after the discovery of connections to the Wanninkhof's murder.

On 19 August, during the search, Carabantes' body was found near a stream, naked and covered with stones. The autopsy revealed that Carabantes was killed by asphyxiation. In their investigation of this case the police discovered DNA which matched DNA found at the scene of the murder of Rocío. A woman soon told police that she suspected her ex-husband and when the police questioned him it was soon discovered that it was, indeed, his DNA. His name was Tony Alexander King, an English immigrant who, with his wife and daughter had come to live in southern Spain. It turned out he had a long criminal history and had served time in England for sexual crimes before changing his name and settling in Spain.

Vázquez's upcoming trial was first suspended and then the case was closed and she was set free having spent 17 months in prison.

== Trial of Tony Alexander King ==
In 2005 Tony Alexander King was sentenced to 36 years in prison for the death of Sonia Carabantes and to an additional seven years for an unrelated sexual attack he had committed. In 2006 he was found guilty of the death of Rocío Wanninkhof and was sentenced to 19 years in prison for that crime.

== Aftermath ==
Despite Vázquez's exoneration and subsequent conviction of King, Hornos remains convinced that Vázquez was involved in her daughter's murder and has stated this belief repeatedly. She also denies being homosexual or bisexual, despite admitting her past relationship with Vázquez, and blames the latter on Vázquez's manipulation alone.

== Criticism ==
=== Media coverage ===
The disappearances and murders of Wanninkhof and Carabantes were front-page news from day one. The local, national and international media spent a lot of time publicizing the murders. Publicly, this event is known as the "Wanninkhof-Carabantes case". Many experts believe that the media was an important factor in the criminal accusations against Vázquez. The media had labeled Vázquez as a suspect, calling her "dominant", "predatory" lesbian. During the investigation and trial of Vázquez, public opinion had claimed to be the murderer. It was considered that the public and media pressure was too much and that the Spanish Civil Guard were desperate to accuse someone. It is believed that the jury in the murder trial was biased against Vázquez due to media accusations.

The writer Rafael Gomez-Caminero said: "This power we have to denounce unjust situations can undoubtedly destroy the lives of innocent people". As with the disappearance and murder of Diana Quer, the Spanish media demonstrated "morbidity", "sensationalism" and prejudices.

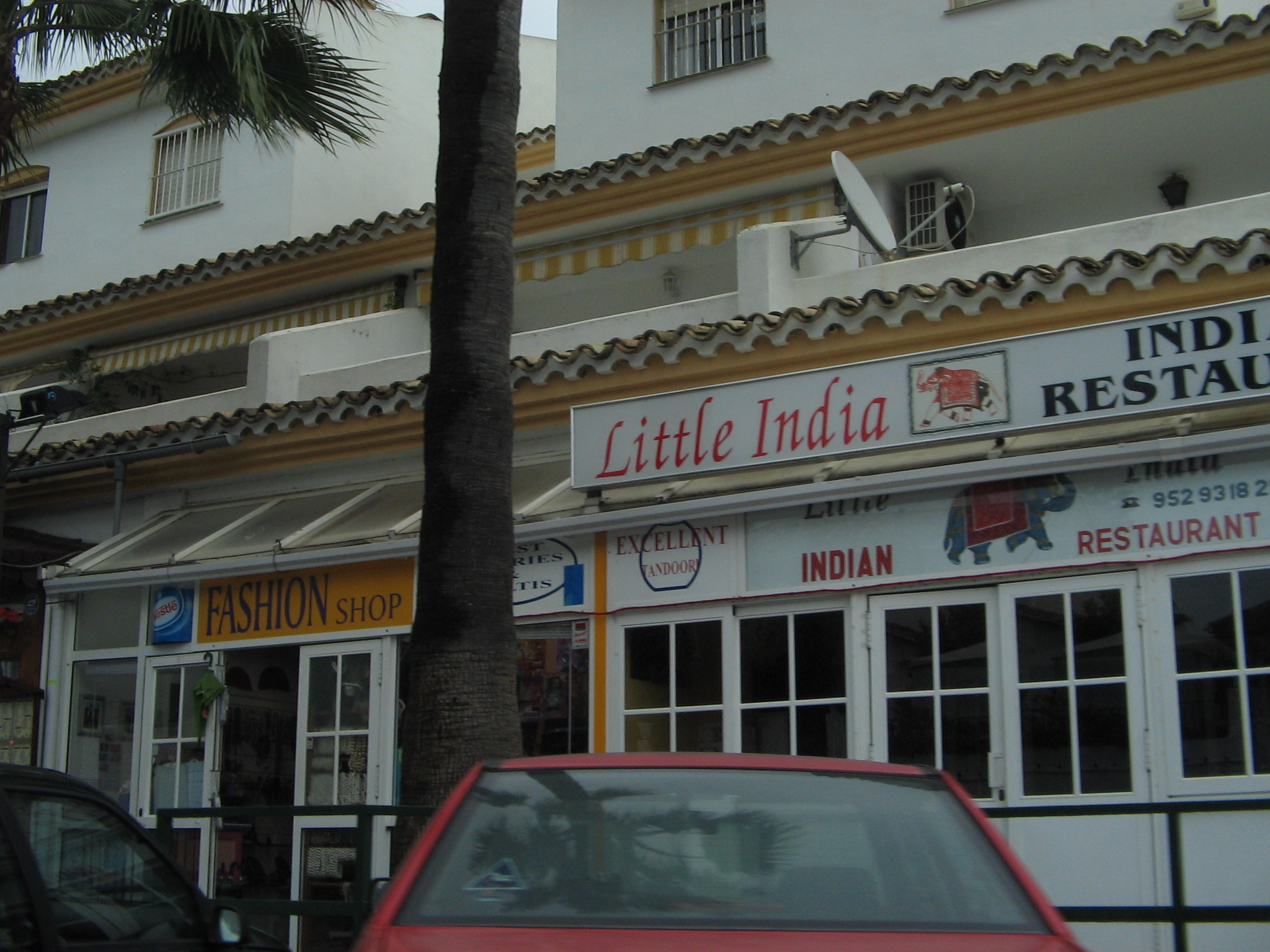
British-oriented business in Mijas with English-only signs

=== Self-isolation of British communities in Spain ===
In 2003 it was estimated that the whole province was home to 180,000 permanent British residents and four or five times more transient ones, in addition to seven English-language newspapers, eight English-language radio stations and numerous real estate firms and pubs staffed and catered to British customers only.

== In media ==
In 2008, a miniseries titled El Caso Wanninkhof was released by Televisión Española, with Valentina Burgueño starring as Rocío.

In 2021, Netflix released the feature-length documentary film Murder by the Coast (El Caso Wanninkhof-Carabantes in Spanish) narrating the events, timeline and aftermath of the case.

Also in 2021, HBO Max released the six-part docuseries Dolores: The Truth About the Wanninkhof Case (Dolores: La verdad sobre el caso Wanninkhof in Spanish), which features Vázquez speaking publicly for the first time since her acquittal.

== See also ==
- List of solved missing person cases
- Alcàsser Girls
- Disappearance of Amy Fitzpatrick
- Murder of Meredith Kercher
- Murder of Lindsay Rimer, an unsolved 1994 murder in England once linked to Tony King
