= Gabe Kennedy =

American chef

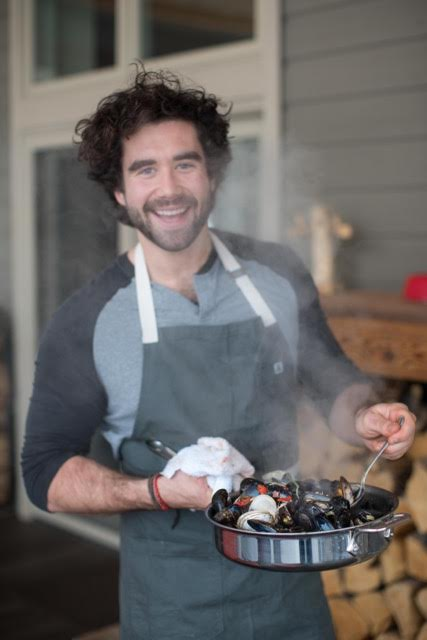
- Born: November 17, 1990 (age 35); Portland, Oregon, U.S.
- Education: The Culinary Institute of America; Cornell University School of Hotel Administration
- Culinary career
- Television show(s): The Taste (winner) Dinner Spinner (host)
- Website: gabekennedy.com

Gabriel Kennedy (born November 17, 1990) is an American businessman, chef, and TV host. He is the co-founder of Plant People, a health and wellness company focusing on mushroom and herbal supplements. Gabe is also the Chef and Partner at Checker Hall, a restaurant and bar in Los Angeles.

== Early life and education ==
Kennedy was born on November 17, 1990, in Portland, Oregon. His father is a chiropractor and his mother an acupuncturist, which helped introduce Kennedy to Chinese herbal medicine and a belief in the curative powers of food. He graduated first in his class from The Culinary Institute of America, and is a graduate of the Cornell University School of Hotel Administration. He is also a Deans Distinguished Lecturer for the School of Hotel Administration.

== Career ==
Kennedy started his career at age 14 working in local Boulder, Colorado restaurants. He worked his way up to the NYC establishment Bouley by David Bouley, and in 2015 he was the visiting executive chef of Bon Appétit Magazine. Kennedy is a co-founder of Plant People, a cannabis wellness brand, which produces and sells herbal, mushroom and CBD-based supplements based in New York City.

In 2015, Kennedy was named as ambassador of Concern Worldwide U.S. In April 2015 in Haiti, Kennedy worked to provide food service and hospitality education. In 2015, Kennedy won the third season of ABC's reality series The Taste.

In 2016, Kennedy hosted the Saturday morning cooking competition show on the CW network called Dinner Spinner. In November 2016, Kennedy partnered with Taiwan's Tourism Bureau to explore the country's cuisine.

In 2020, Kennedy was named in Forbes 30 under 30 in the food and drink category In 2021, Kennedy appeared on Selena Gomez's HBO cooking show, Selena + Chef.

He is also the Director of Culinary and Innovation for the vegetarian restaurants Little Beet and Little Beet Table.
