= Alexander Smalls =

American restaurateur (born 1952)

Alexander Smalls (born February 7, 1952) is an African-American chef, restaurateur, and former opera singer.

Smalls was born on February 7, 1952, in Spartanburg, South Carolina into a Gullah Geechee family. He graduated from Spartanburg High School in 1970, attended Wofford College and then the University of North Carolina School of the Arts, where he studied opera, earning a Bachelor of Fine Arts in 1974. He also studied at Philadelphia's Curtis Institute of Music.

He opened a number of Southern and low country restaurants in New York City, including Café Beulah, Sweet Ophelia’s, and The Cecil, which was named the best new restaurant in America in 2013 by Esquire. He's also written cookbooks, including the James Beard Award-winning Between Harlem and Heaven (2018; with JJ Johnson).

Before he became a restaurateur, Smalls won Grammy and Tony Awards for a cast recording of Porgy and Bess.
