= Murder by the Coast =

- Spanish: El caso Wanninkhof-Carabantes
- Directed by: Tània Balló
- Written by: Gonzalo Berger
- Release date: June 23, 2021
- Running time: 88 minutes
- Country: Spain
- Languages: Spanish; English

Murder by the Coast (Spanish: El caso Wanninkhof-Carabantes) is a 2021 Spanish documentary film directed by Tània Balló and written by Gonzalo Berger. The film describes the murder of Rocío Wanninkhof. The film was released on Netflix on 23 June 2021.
