= Quiet in Class =

2025 Swedish docuseries

- Swedish: Tyst i klassen
- Country of origin: Sweden
- Original language: Swedish

Production
- Producer: Stefan Stridh
- Production companies: Alaska Film & TV

Original release
- Network: HBO Max
- Release: 29 September 2025

Quiet in Class (Swedish: Tyst i klassen) is a three-part 2025 Swedish documentary series. It investigates a child pornography scandal at the Internationella Engelska Skolan (IES) in Karlstad, Sweden, where a male staff member surreptitiously filmed and photographed students over several years before sharing the material online. Examining the legal and personal implications of the case, which involved 166 female students as plaintiffs, the series' three episodes premiered globally on HBO Max on 29 September 2025.

== Episodes ==
No.	Title	Directed by	Original release date
1	"They Never Listened" (De Lyssnade Aldrig)	Unknown	29 September 2025
2	"A Cult-Like Culture" (En Sektliknande Kultur)	Unknown	29 September 2025
3	"Complete Cover-Up" (Total Mörkläggning)	Unknown	29 September 2025

== Production ==
The series was produced by Stefan Stridh for Alaska Film & TV.

== Reception ==
Writing for Decider, Joel Keller gave the series a "Stream It" recommendation, primarily praising the bravery of the former students who shared their testimonies. However, he criticised the overall production style, describing it as "exploitative" and "salacious." He felt the narrative focus on the whistleblower's identity served as a distraction from the school's failure to act on numerous warnings about the staff member raised between 2017 and 2023. He also took issue with the series' use of reenactments; citing the frequent use of an actor photographing students as unnecessary and "creepy."

Internationella Engelska Skolan (IES) issued a press release stating that the accounts of former students were "deeply moving" but disputed the documentary series' central premise. It described claims that it failed to act as "untrue" and asserted that strict criminal record check policies were followed. IES also characterised the presence of predators in schools as a broader "societal problem." The school declined to participate in the documentary, citing an ongoing police investigation.
