= Dolores: The Truth About the Wanninkhof Case =

Spanish docuseries

- Dolores: La verdad sobre el caso Wanninkhof
- Genre: Documentary
- Country of origin: Spain
- Original language: Spanish
- No. of seasons: 1
- No. of episodes: 6

Production
- Running time: 49–54 minutes

Original release
- Network: HBO Max
- Release: October 26, 2021

Dolores: The Truth About the Wanninkhof Case (Spanish: Dolores: La verdad sobre el caso Wanninkhof) is a Spanish documentary television series about the case of the murder of Rocío Wanninkhof. Produced by Unicorn Content for HBO Max, it was released on 26 October 2021.

== Episodes ==
No.	Title	Original release date
1	"Rocío"	October 26, 2021
2	"Dolores"	October 26, 2021
3	"Alicia"	October 26, 2021
4	"Sonia"	October 26, 2021
5	"Tony"	October 26, 2021
6	"Loli"	October 26, 2021

== Release ==
Dolores: The Truth About the Wanninkhof Case was released on 26 October 2021 on HBO Max. It is one of the first Spanish original titles of the HBO Max catalogue, which debuted in Europe on 26 October 2021.
