= Sandy + Chef =

Web series

- Genre: Cooking show
- Based on: Selena + Chef
- Presented by: Sandy Leah
- Opening theme: Eu só preciso ser
- Country of origin: Brazil
- Original language: Portuguese
- No. of seasons: 1
- No. of episodes: 6

Production
- Executive producer: Diego Guebel
- Editors: Elias Machado Angico; Glauco Giani; Lorena Penko; Renato Galazans; Roberto Sambrana
- Running time: 24-25 minutes
- Production company: BXFSH (box fish)

Original release
- Network: HBO Max
- Release: 11 November 2021

Sandy + Chef is a Brazilian television cooking show hosted by Sandy Leah based on the American television show Selena + Chef. The show premiered on HBO Max on November 11, 2021. The first season consists of 6 episodes.

== Premise ==
Sandy stars in an unscripted cooking series filmed in her home during quarantine. Each episode features Sandy tackling a new cuisine and guest stars a different professional chef, where they cover tips and tricks and how to deal with disasters in the kitchen. For each episode, the show donates R$25,000 to the charity of the Chef's choice, often food related.

== Cast ==
Sandy Leah stars as the host of the series. Confirmed guests for the first season include:

- Paola Carosella
- Murakami
- Lili Almeida
- Thiago Castanho
- Renata Vanzetto
- João Diamante
