= Arroyo del Ojanco =

Arroyo del Ojanco, Spain
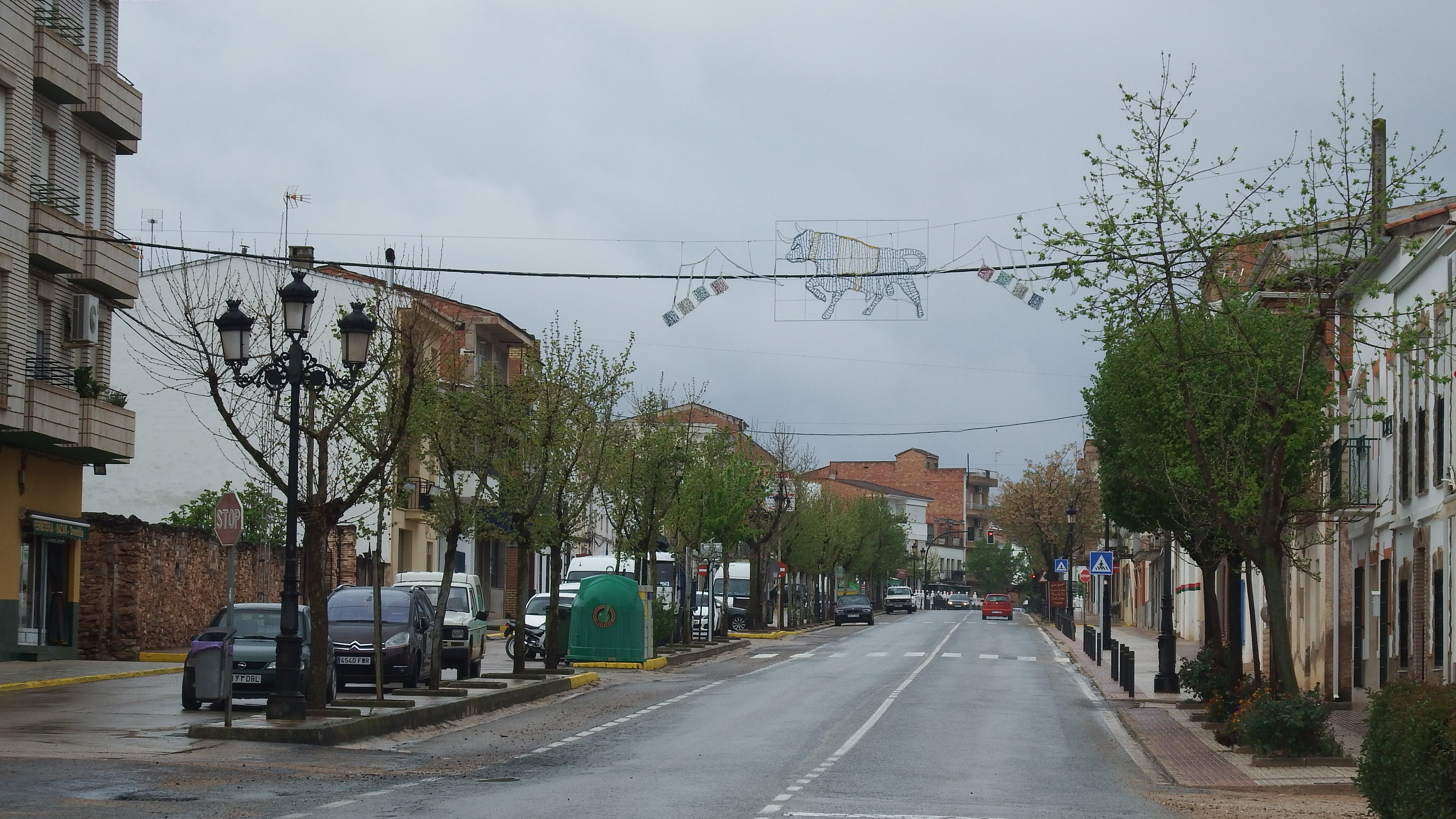
- Arroyo del Ojanco

- Flag Coat of arms

- Location in the Province of Jaén Arroyo del Ojanco (Andalusia) Arroyo del Ojanco (Spain)
- Coordinates: 38.32°N 2.89°W
- Country: Spain
- Autonomous community: Andalusia
- Province: Jaén
- Municipality: Arroyo del Ojanco

Area
  - Total: 57.31 km^{2} (22.13 sq mi)
- Elevation: 540 m (1,770 ft)

Population (2025-01-01)
  - Total: 2,158
  - Density: 37.65/km^{2} (97.53/sq mi)
- Time zone: UTC+1 (CET)
  - Summer (DST): UTC+2 (CEST)

Arroyo del Ojanco is a village belonging to the 'Sierra de Segura' shire (comarca de la Sierra de Segura) in the province of Jaén, Spain. According to 2024 INE figures, the village had a population of 2143 inhabitants. It is surrounded by Segura de la Sierra, Beas de Segura, Puente de Génave and Chiclana de Segura's municipal districts. It is located in the access of 'Sierra de Cazorla, Segura y las Villas' Natural Park and the Guadalimar river passes through its district.

On January 21, 2001, it became independent of 'Beas de Segura' town council. This process began with a denied request on June 4, 1953, as a result of a resolution by the Spanish 'Consejo de Ministros' (Ministers' Council). On November 3, 1958, another request was made to the 'Ministro de Gobernación' (Government Minister) that was also refused on September 10, 1959, in a decree. In September 1983 a Pro-Segregation committee was founded and a dossier was submitted to the 'Beas de Segura' council, which sent it to the Andalusian regional Government. In 1991 a lawsuit was reported in the Tribunal Superior de Justicia de Andalucía (Andalusia's Major Court) and it was approved on April 5, 1993. It was delayed until January 18, 2001, when the Major Court approved it.

The Fuentebuena olive tree can be found in its municipal district. This olive tree was proclaimed a Natural Monument by the Andalusia's Government and it is included in the Guinness Book of World Records as the most ancient olive tree in the world.

== See also ==
- List of municipalities in Jaén
