= Paola Velez =

Pastry Chef and social justice activist (born 1990)

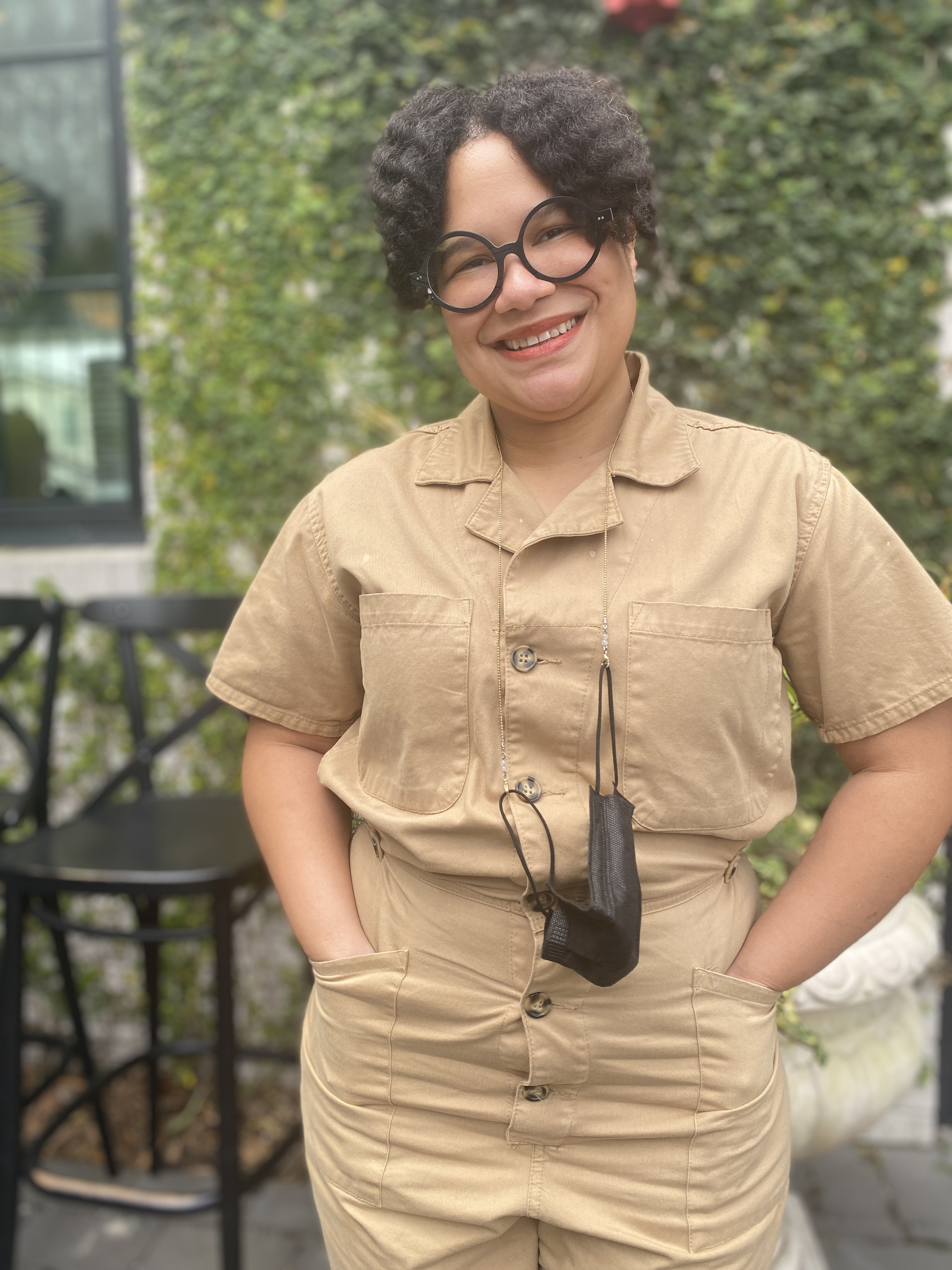
- Born: December 16, 1990 (age 35)
- Education: Le Cordon Bleu
- Occupation: Pastry chef
- Organization: Bar Providencia

Paola Velez (December 16, 1990) is a pastry chef and social justice activist. She has worked for restaurants such as Milk Bar and Maydan in Washington, D.C., and she co-founded the organization Bakers Against Racism, as well as the donut pop-up shop Doña Dona in 2020.

== Early life ==
Velez grew up in The Bronx, New York. Her mother worked as an accountant for the Tex-Mex restaurant Mary Ann’s, which was owned by her mother’s cousin. She spent her childhood summers visiting her grandparents at their family home in the Dominican Republic. During her summers spent in the Dominican, she gained an appreciation for fresh produce, learning how to grow her own vegetables and fruit, and experiencing her grandmother’s home cooking.

== Career ==
Velez was educated at Le Cordon Bleu in Orlando, Florida. After graduating in 2009, Velez studied for two years under Jacques Torres, an expert in the chocolate industry, at his factory in Brooklyn, New York. Velez moved from New York to Washington, D.C., in 2016 to work as a pastry chef at Milk Bar under chef Christina Tosi. With her gained experience, Velez transitioned to the position of Lead Pastry Cook at D.C. restaurant Arroz. She also functioned as the pastry chef for the Iron Gate Restaurant in 2018, and for Kith/Kin in 2019. Velez led the kitchen at Compass Rose and Michelin-starred Maydan while serving as the restaurant’s Executive Pastry Chef. After being furloughed during the Covid-19 pandemic, Velez joined Food&Wine Magazine to create the online streaming show, Pastries with Paola, in which she shares recipes inspired by her Dominican heritage.

In 2024 she became a co‑owner and co‑chef of Bar Providencia, a compact cocktail bar on H Street NE in Washington, D.C., created with Erik Bruner‑Yang and Maketto bartenders Pedro Tobar and Daniel Gonzalez. At Providencia, Vélez’s shaved‑ice baked Alaska dessert became a signature attraction, complementing a concise menu of globally inspired bar snacks. In December 2024, Providencia was named Bar of the Year by Eater D.C. for its inventive, memory‑driven cocktails and collaborative energy. In May 2025, Bon Appétit included Providencia in its list of the 9 Best New Bars in America, highlighting its storytelling cocktails rooted in Central American nostalgia and culinary touches from Vélez’s Dominican heritage alongside Asian‑Latin fusion bites.

== Awards ==
Chef Paola Velez has received significant recognition for both her culinary prowess and advocacy efforts. In 2020, she was a finalist for the prestigious James Beard Foundation Rising Star Chef of the Year award and was named “Pastry Chef of the Year” by both Esquire Magazine and the Restaurant Association of Metropolitan Washington. The following year, she was honored as one of Food & Wine’s Best New Chefs and earned accolades such as InStyle’s 50 Women Making the World a Better Place, Time Out Magazine’s Woman of the Year, and the Washington Business Journal Diversity in Business Award. She also secured a dual nomination in 2021—both an Emmy and a Webby—for her multimedia work with AJ+ and Bakers Against Racism. In 2024, her debut cookbook, Bodega Bakes, was selected as a Notable Book by RUSA CODES and received starred reviews, while being named to “best of” lists from major outlets including The New York Times, Epicurious, Food & Wine, Eater, Bon Appétit, The Boston Globe, The Washington Post, and others. Most notably, in 2025 she became the first chef of Dominican heritage to win a James Beard Foundation Media Award, securing the Emerging Voice in Books award for Bodega Bakes.

== Activism ==
In April 2020 Velez co-founded the donut pop-up shop Doña Dona with Daniella Senior, founder of the Cuban cafe Colada Shop and the cocktail bar Serenata. Doña Dona raised around $1,100 that was donated to Ayunda D.C., an organization providing social and legal support for D.C. immigrants. After Doña Dona’s success, Velez co-founded Bakers Against Racism, a movement raising money for racial justice organization through baking, with pastry chef Willa Pelini. Velez also enlisted chef Rob Rubba to create graphic designs to garner support for the organization over social media. Through their posts, the chefs were able to virtually gather bakers from across the country to create their own bake sales supporting racial justice advocacy. Since its launch in 2020, Bakers Against Racism has gained more than 3,000 participants in over 200 U.S. cities and raised over $2 million for organizations supporting Black Lives Matter. Bakers Against Racism has been recognized as the largest bake sale in history, raising millions of dollars.

== Personal life ==
Velez moved to Washington, D.C., in 2016 with her husband Hector Velez.

== Works ==
=== Books ===
- Bodega Bakes (2024)
