= Los Javis =

Los Javis may refer to:

== Arts and entertainment ==
- Javier Ambrossi and Javier Calvo, known together as "Los Javis"
