= JJ Johnson (chef) =

American chef (born 1984/85)

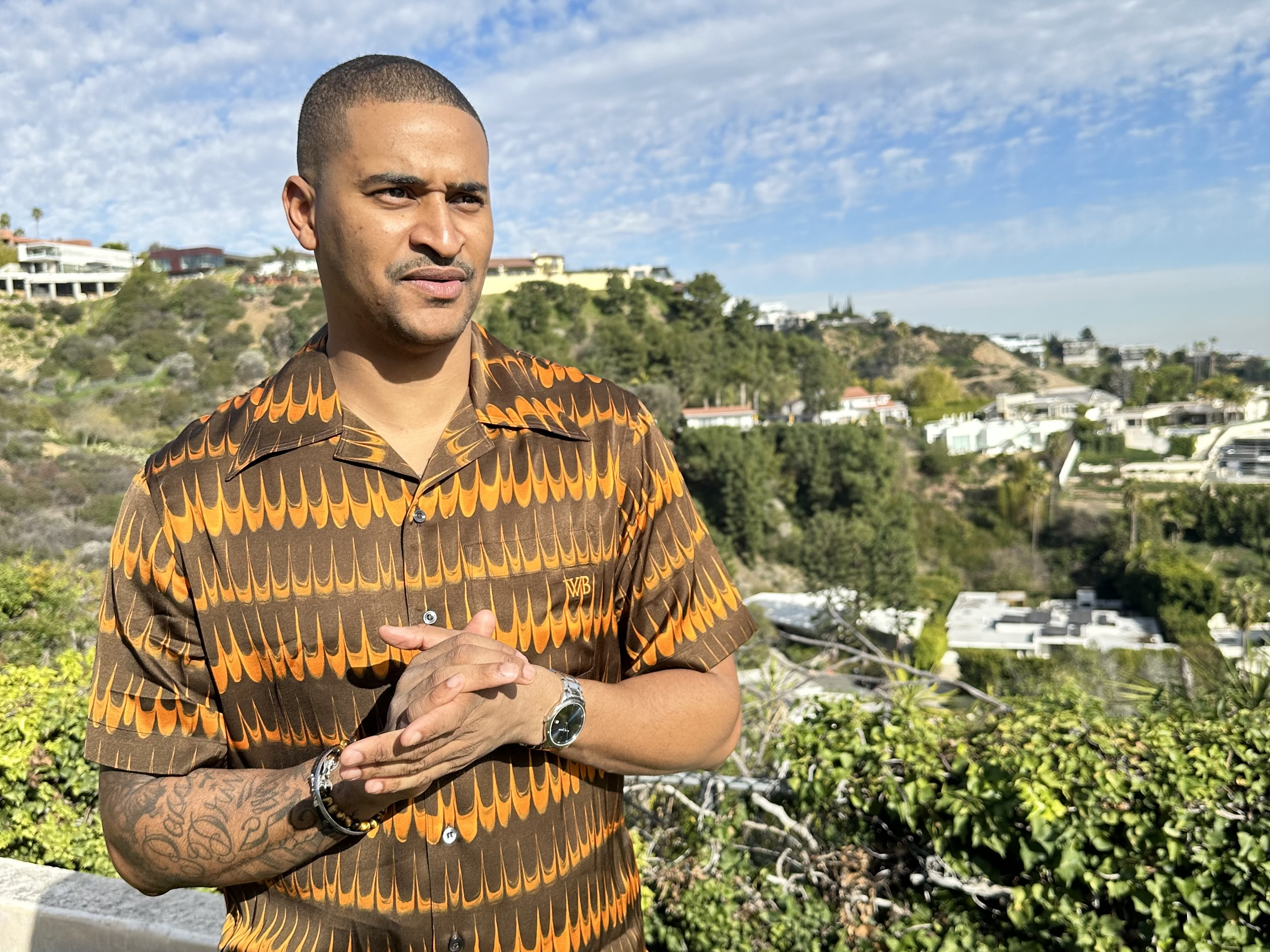
- Born: Joseph Johnson; 1984 or 1985 (age 41–42); Long Island, New York
- Education: Culinary Institute of America
- Culinary career
- Cooking style: Afro-Asian
- Current restaurant: FieldTrip
- Previous restaurants: The Cecil, Minton's; Centro Vinoteca; Jane; Tribeca Grill
- Awards won: James Beard Foundation Best American Cookbook (2019); Forbes' 30 Under 30 in the Food & Wine category (2014); Zagat's 30 Under 30 (2014); Eater Young Gun (2014)
- Website: fieldtripnyc.com

Joseph Johnson is an American chef and author best known for cooking the food of the African diaspora. He is the 2019 recipient of a James Beard Foundation Book Award, which he received for Between Harlem and Heaven, co-authored with Alexander Smalls.

Johnson is the founder of fast-casual restaurant Fieldtrip. He was a chef on BuzzFeed's Tasty platform and a television host on Just Eats with Chef JJ.

== Early life and education ==
Johnson was born in Long Island, New York, to a family of Caribbean ancestry. His grandparents were born in Barbados, Mississippi, North Carolina, and Puerto Rico. He spent his early life in the Poconos.

At the age of seven, Johnson was inspired to become a chef after seeing a commercial for the Culinary Institute of America. He grew up reading his grandmother's cookbooks.

== Career ==
After graduating from the Culinary Institute of America, Johnson spent time in Ghana studying West African cuisine, before returning to cook at several New York City restaurants, including Tropico, Jane, Tribeca Grill, and Centro Vinoteca.

In 2011, Johnson competed and won Bravo's Rocco's Dinner Party cooking competition. Later, Alexander Smalls invited Johnson to breakfast to introduce the concept of Afro-Asian cooking to him. A year later, Johnson joined Smalls on an extended trip to Ghana, where they prepared a series of American-themed dinners. Upon their return, Smalls and Johnson developed 36 different menus that would ultimately be narrowed down to one Afro-Asian-inspired menu for The Cecil in 2013. The Cecil opened in 2013, and Johnson served as its executive chef from then until 2017. In 2014, he also joined Minton's, which is a sister restaurant of The Cecil. Later, in 2015, he was appointed as the executive chef for both restaurants.

In 2017, Johnson joined Chef's Club in New York City after leaving The Cecil and Minton. During his tenure, he expanded the menu with braised meats, rice dishes, and West African peanut sauce as part of the club's first extended chef residency program.

In 2018, Johnson became the executive chef at The Henry at Life Hotel in Manhattan, with a menu that focuses on African diaspora cuisine. In the same year, he co-authored the Afro-Asian inspired cookbook, Between Harlem and Heaven, with Alexander Smalls and Veronica Chambers.

In 2019, Johnson established Fieldtrip, a fast-casual restaurant that sources unprocessed rice from farmers. A year later, in 2020, Fieldtrip was opened at Rockefeller Center. In 2021, two major investment firms funded Johnson's plan to expand to more locations. In October 2022, Fieldtrip was opened near Columbia University's Morningside Campus. Fieldtrip was listed on Esquire's 'America's Best New Restaurants' list in 2020 and was the only fast-casual restaurant on the list.

== Awards and recognition ==
- James Beard Foundation Award for Best American Cookbook (2019)
- Forbes 30 Under 30 in the Food & Wine category (2014)
- Zagat 30 Under 30 (2014)
- Eater Young Guns (2014)

== Television shows ==
- Just Eats with Chef JJ
- Street Food
- The Next Thing You Eat
- Chopped
- The Big Brunch
- Secret Chef

== Cookbooks ==
- Johnson, JJ; Smalls, Alexander; Chambers, Veronica (2018). Between Harlem and Heaven
- Johnson, JJ: Danica Novgorodoff (2023). The Simple Art of Rice
