= 1st Critics Choice Real TV Awards =

2019 American television awards

1st Critics' Choice Real TV Awards
- Date: June 2, 2019
- Location: The Beverly Hilton, Los Angeles
- Country: United States
- Presented by: Broadcast Television Journalists Association and NPACT
- Hosted by: Loni Love
- Website: www.criticschoice.com/critics-choice-real-tv-awards/

Television/radio coverage
- Network: VH1

The 1st Critics' Choice Real TV Awards, presented by the Broadcast Television Journalists Association and NPACT, which recognizes excellence in nonfiction, unscripted and reality programming across broadcast, cable and streaming platforms, were held on June 2, 2019, at The Beverly Hilton in Los Angeles, California. The ceremony was streamed on VH1 on June 9. Loni Love served as the host of the ceremony.

== Winners and nominees ==
Winners are highlighted in boldface:

=== Competition Series ===
- **RuPaul's Drag Race**
  - Making It
  - Project Runway
  - Survivor: David vs. Goliath
  - Top Chef

=== Competition Series: Talent/Variety ===
- **The Masked Singer**
  - America's Got Talent: The Champions
  - So You Think You Can Dance
  - The Voice
  - World of Dance

=== Unstructured Series ===
- **Born This Way**
  - Deadliest Catch
  - Intervention
  - Many Sides of Jane
  - RuPaul's Drag Race: Untucked!

=== Structured Series ===
- **Queer Eye**
  - Lip Sync Battle
  - Magic for Humans
  - Shark Tank
  - Tidying Up with Marie Kondo
  - Who Do You Think You Are?

=== Business Show ===
- **Shark Tank**
  - Bar Rescue
  - Gordon Ramsay's 24 Hours to Hell and Back
  - Selling Sunset
  - T-Pain's School of Business

=== Sports Show ===
- **American Ninja Warrior**
  - Losers
  - Real Sports with Bryant Gumbel
  - Sunderland 'Til I Die
  - Warriors of Liberty City

=== Crime/Justice Show ===
- **Conversations with a Killer: The Ted Bundy Tapes**
  - Betrayed
  - In Pursuit with John Walsh
  - Making a Murderer: Part 2
  - The Innocent Man

=== Ongoing Documentary Series ===
- **POV**
  - Chef's Table
  - The Circus: Inside the Wildest Political Show on Earth
  - United Shades of America
  - Vice

=== Limited Documentary Series ===
- **Surviving R. Kelly**
  - Conversations with a Killer: The Ted Bundy Tapes
  - Our Planet
  - Punk
  - Shut Up and Dribble

=== Short Form Series ===
- **Carpool Karaoke: The Series**
  - 9 Months with Courteney Cox
  - Biography Presents: History, Herstory
  - Comeback Kids
  - The Daily Show with Trevor Noah: Between the Scenes

=== Live Show ===
- **The Voice**
  - BUILD
  - La Voz
  - So You Think You Can Dance
  - Yellowstone Live

=== Interactive Show ===
- **Watch What Happens Live with Andy Cohen**
  - Talking Dead
  - You vs. Wild

=== Talk Show ===
- **My Next Guest Needs No Introduction with David Letterman**
  - Comedians in Cars Getting Coffee
  - Red Table Talk
  - The Ellen DeGeneres Show
  - The View

=== Late-Night Talk Show ===
- **Last Week Tonight with John Oliver**
- **The Late Late Show with James Corden**
  - Full Frontal with Samantha Bee
  - The Daily Show with Trevor Noah
  - The Late Show with Stephen Colbert

=== Entertainment News Show ===
- **Entertainment Tonight**
  - Access
  - E! News
  - Extra
  - Inside Edition

=== Culinary Show ===
- **The Great British Baking Show**
  - Chopped
  - Nailed It!
  - Salt Fat Acid Heat
  - Top Chef

=== Game Show ===
- **Jeopardy!**
  - Cash Cab
  - Common Knowledge
  - Ellen's Game of Games
  - Hollywood Game Night

=== Travel/Adventure Show ===
- **The Great Food Truck Race**
  - Expedition Unknown
  - Larry Charles' Dangerous World of Comedy
  - Somebody Feed Phil
  - The Voyager with Josh Garcia

=== Animal/Nature Show ===
- **Our Planet**
  - Amanda to the Rescue
  - Dodo Heroes
  - Dynasties
  - Hostile Planet

=== Lifestyle Show: Fashion/Beauty ===
- **Queer Eye**
  - Project Runway
  - Project Runway All-Stars
  - Say Yes to the Dress

=== Relationship Show ===
- **Dating Around**
- **Married at First Sight**
  - Born This Way
  - The Bachelor
  - Wife Swap

=== Lifestyle Show: Home/Garden ===
- **Property Brothers**
  - Home Town
  - Love It or List It
  - Tidying Up with Marie Kondo
  - Trading Spaces

=== Ensemble Cast in an Unscripted Series ===
- **Queer Eye**
  - Crikey! It's The Irwins
  - RuPaul's Drag Race
  - The Real Housewives of New York City
  - Trading Spaces

=== Show Host ===
- **James Corden – The Late Late Show with James Corden**
  - RuPaul Charles – RuPaul's Drag Race
  - Stephen Colbert – The Late Show with Stephen Colbert
  - Busy Philipps – Busy Tonight
  - Jerry Seinfeld – Comedians in Cars Getting Coffee

=== Female Star of The Year ===
- **Sandra Lee – Dr. Pimple Popper**
  - Nicole Byer – Nailed It!
  - Marie Kondo – Tidying Up With Marie Kondo
  - Samin Nosrat – Salt Fat Acid Heat
  - Chrissy Teigen – Lip Sync Battle
  - Michelle Visage – RuPaul's Drag Race

=== Male Star of The Year ===
- **Jonathan Van Ness – Queer Eye**
  - David Attenborough – Our Planet
  - RuPaul Charles – RuPaul's Drag Race
  - Hasan Minhaj – Patriot Act with Hasan Minhaj
  - Phil Rosenthal – Somebody Feed Phil

=== Outstanding Achievement in Nonfiction by a Network or Streaming Platform ===
- **Netflix**
  - A&E
  - Bravo
  - FOX
  - Investigation Discovery
  - NBC

=== Outstanding Achievement in Nonfiction Production ===
- **Kreativ Inc.**
  - A. Smith & Co. Productions
  - Big Fish Entertainment
  - Endemol Shine North America
  - The Intellectual Property Corporation (IPC)

== Shows with multiple wins ==
The following shows received multiple awards:

Wins	Show
4	Queer Eye
4	The Late Late Show with James Corden
