= Drexel University College of Medicine =

Medical college in Philadelphia, Pennsylvania, US

Coordinates: 40.01977°N 75.17966°W

- Motto: In the tradition of Woman's Medical College of Pennsylvania and Hahnemann Medical College
- Type: Private medical school
- Established: 1848; 178 years ago
- Parent institution: Drexel University
- Dean: Charles B. Cairns
- Location: Philadelphia, Pennsylvania, United States
- Campus: Health Sciences Building in University City
- Website: drexel.edu/medicine

Drexel University College of Medicine is the medical school of Drexel University, a private research university in Philadelphia, Pennsylvania. The medical school represents the consolidation of two medical schools: Hahnemann Medical College, originally founded as the nation's first college of homeopathy, and the Woman's Medical College of Pennsylvania, the first U.S. medical school for women, which became the Medical College of Pennsylvania when it admitted men in 1970; these institutions merged in 1993, became affiliated with Drexel University College of Medicine in 1998, and were fully absorbed into the university in 2002. With one of the nation's largest enrollments for a private medical school, Drexel University College of Medicine is the second most applied-to medical school in the United States.

The college is housed in University City, Philadelphia, Pennsylvania, at the new Health Sciences Building at the main campus of Drexel University. The Health Sciences Building will be primarily used by students during their preclinical training. The MD program was formerly housed at the Queen Lane Campus, near the Henry Ave site of the former Woman's Medical College of Pennsylvania. The Center City Hahnemann University Hospital Campus was the college's primary teaching hospital until its closure in 2019.

The College of Medicine follows a systems-based curriculum that is graded pass/fail. Beginning with the 2017–18 school year, the MD program transitioned into a curriculum known as "Foundations and Frontiers". Designed to train physicians that are adept at navigating the increasingly multidisciplinary healthcare system of tomorrow, this new curriculum includes essential emerging competencies such as an understanding of population health, health informatics, and health care systems and financing. To foster a greater sense of community, first year medical students are divided into six learning societies based on local iconic landmarks: Athenaeum; Liberty Bell; Physick House; Rocky Statue; Reading Terminal; and Eakins House.

== History ==
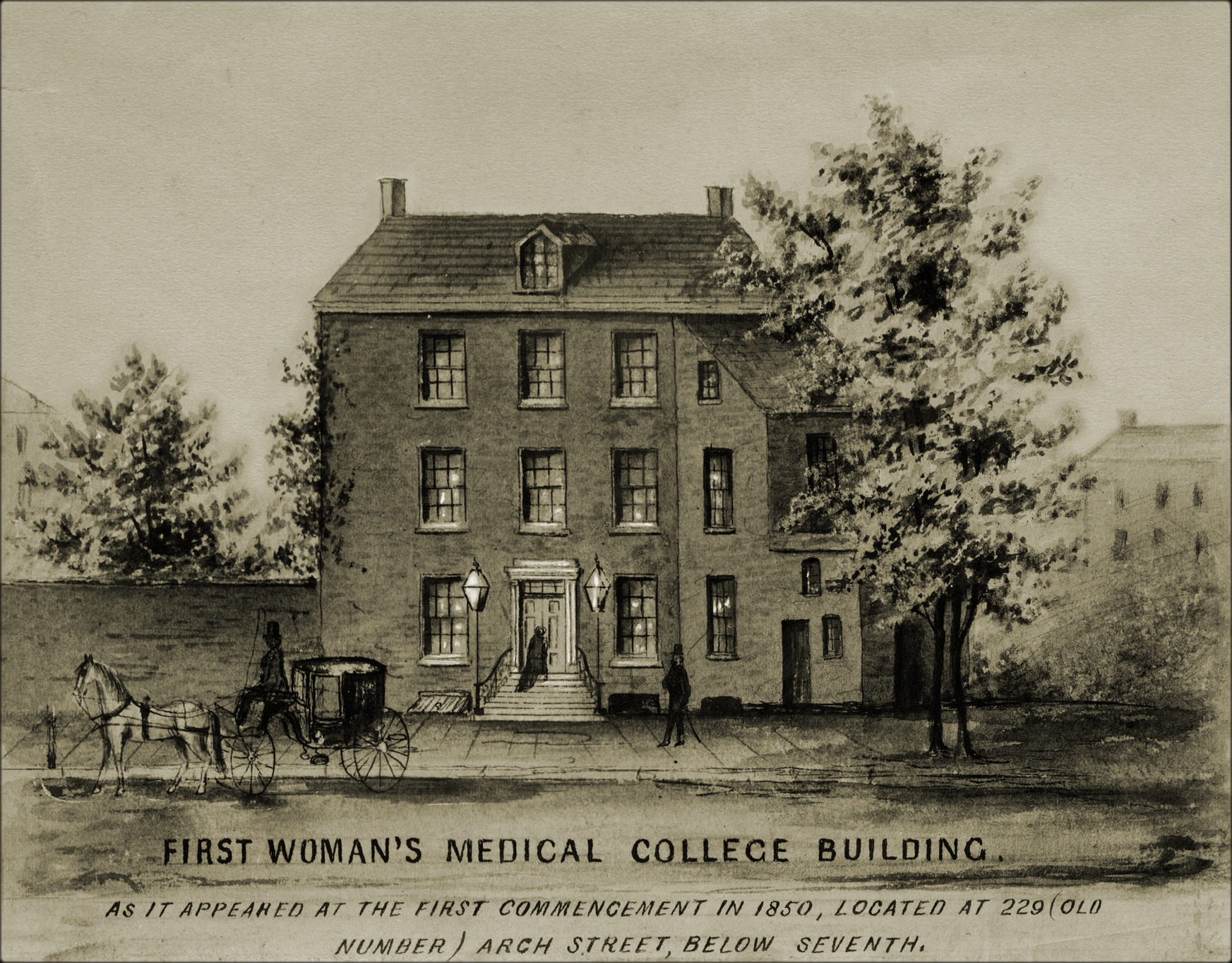
The first building to house the Woman's Medical College of Pennsylvania, founded in 1850

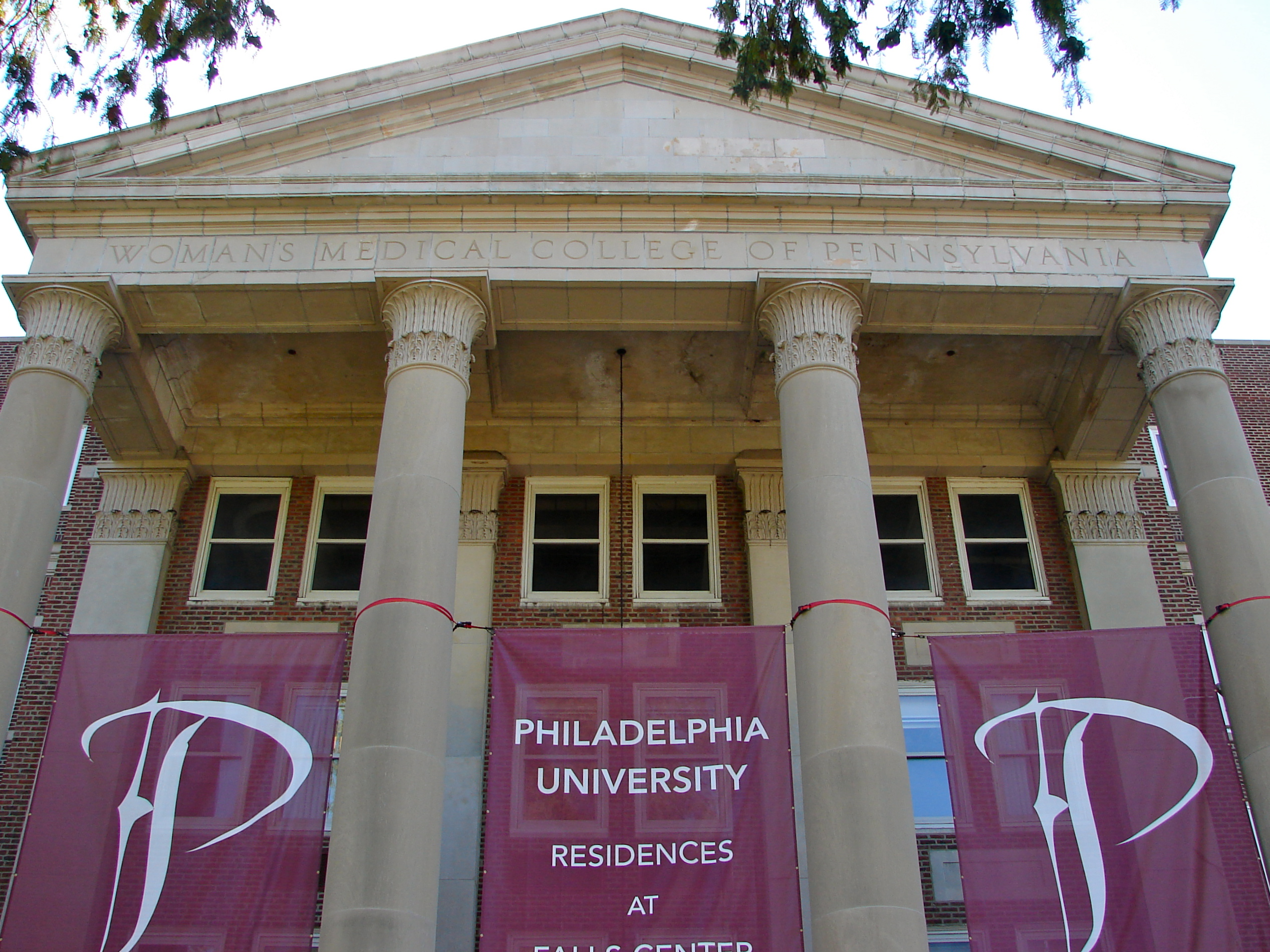
The former Medical College building on Henry Avenue before the College of Medicine moved to its current location on Queen Lane

Drexel University College of Medicine went through many name changes throughout its history. The medical school began as two separate medical schools: Hahnemann Medical College and Woman's Medical College of Pennsylvania (WMCP). In 1848, three homeopathic physicians began operating the Homeopathic Medical College of Pennsylvania, offering M.D. and H.M.D degrees, by teaching 15 students. WMCP was founded in 1850 as Female Medical College of Pennsylvania but changed its name in 1867 to WMCP. It was the second medical institution in the world established to train women in medicine to earn the M.D. degree. Upon deciding to admit men in 1970, the college was renamed as the Medical College of Pennsylvania (MCP)

In 1993, the Medical College of Pennsylvania merged with Hahnemann. Hahnemann had dropped its homeopathic focus by the late 1920s.

In 2002, Drexel University assumed the leadership; this created the College of Medicine in its present form.

=== Hahnemann Medical College ===
- Homeopathic Medical College of Pennsylvania, 1848–1869
- Hahnemann Medical College, 1867–1982
- Hahnemann University, 1982–1993

In 1848, three homeopathic physicians — Constantine Hering, Jacob Jeanes and Walter Williamson — opened their practice at a Philadelphia pharmacy on 229 Arch Street with the intent to practice homeopathy. With 15 students they began operating the Homeopathic Medical College of Pennsylvania, offering M.D. and H.M.D degrees. Eventually, the college became affiliated with a hospital and moved to its present location near Broad and Vine Streets. By 1928, the 20-story Broad Street location became the site of one of the first high-rise teaching hospitals in the world.

=== Woman's Medical College of Pennsylvania ===
- Female Medical College of Pennsylvania, 1850–1867
- Woman's Medical College of Pennsylvania (WMCP), 1867–1970
- Medical College of Pennsylvania (MCP), 1970–1993

When Hahnemann Medical College left its original site, the building on 229 Arch Street became the first home of the Female (later - after 1867, Woman's) Medical College of Pennsylvania. The New England Female Medical College founded in 1848 but not recognized by the Massachusetts Legislature until April 30, 1850, is considered by some to be the first American medical school for women as it offered a course of medical study to women. On March 11, 1850, however, several weeks before the recognition of the New England Female College, the Pennsylvania legislature passed an act to incorporate the Female Medical College of Pennsylvania. Founded by Quaker businessmen, clergy, and physicians in Philadelphia, "Woman's Med" or MCP was thus the first medical school incorporated in the United States founded specifically to provide medical education exclusively for women. It opened its doors to the first class of women students on October 12, 1850. By 1910, the Woman's Medical College of Pennsylvania "remained as the only school in the United States dedicated to the education of women physicians". When it eventually became coeducational in the later part of the 20th century, it was thus the longest lasting medical school dedicated exclusively to the education of women physicians.

In its early days, female physician training was opposed by the male medical establishment both locally and from notable institutions such as the student body of Harvard Medical School. Students at the Female Medical College of Pennsylvania were jeered.

=== MCP Hahnemann University ===
- MCP Hahnemann School of Medicine, 1993–1996
- Allegheny University of the Health Sciences, 1996–1998
- MCP Hahnemann University School of Medicine, 1998–2002

The Medical College of Pennsylvania merged with Hahnemann University in 1993, creating four fully accredited schools: the School of Medicine, Graduate School, School of Allied Health Professions, and the School of Continuing Education. In 1993, the college became the first medical school in the country to completely integrate women's health issues into its curriculum instead of an occasional lecture or optional elective. Also in that year MCP and Hahnemann University became part of Allegheny Health Education and Research Foundation (AHERF) and were integrated into the Allegheny University of the Health Sciences (AUHS), which included facilities in Pittsburgh, Pennsylvania. Unfortunately, five years later AHERF, which owned eight Philadelphia hospitals, collapsed in the nation's largest bankruptcy of a non-profit health care organization.

In October 1998, in a historic reorganization, the AHERF hospitals were sold to Tenet Healthcare Corporation, a for-profit hospital corporation based in Texas. A new non-profit corporation, Philadelphia Health & Education Corporation (PHEC), was created to carry on the education, research, and service missions under the name MCP Hahnemann University. Drexel University was hired as the university's operator, to bring the same level of expertise to running this academic medical center that Tenet brought to hospital management operations.

On August 3, 2000, former President Gerald Ford was admitted to the hospital after suffering two minor strokes while attending the 2000 Republican National Convention, but made a quick recovery afterwards.

=== Drexel University College of Medicine ===
- Drexel University College of Medicine, 2002–present

After operating MCP Hahnemann University for three and one-half years, the Drexel Board of Trustees agreed to make its relationship with MCP Hahnemann permanent. On July 1, 2002, two of the MCP Hahnemann schools—the College of Nursing and Health Professions and the School of Public Health—formally became integrated with Drexel, and PHEC continued to operate as a legal affiliate of Drexel under its new name, Drexel University College of Medicine. Shortly thereafter, the Secretary of Education for the Commonwealth of Pennsylvania approved the transfer to Drexel University of all degree-granting authority that had previously been vested in MCP Hahnemann University. As a result, all students of the former MCP Hahnemann University became Drexel students and all alumni became affiliated with Drexel as well.

Today, Drexel University College of Medicine has over 1,000 medical students, more than 500 biomedical graduate students, 550 residents, 600 clinical and basic science faculty, and over 1,700 affiliate and volunteer faculty. The college offers a Woman's Health Education Program for its medical students.

Drexel University College of Medicine offered two curricular tracks for the first two years of preclinical medical education:

- A traditional lecture-based curriculum called the Interdisciplinary Foundations of Medicine (IFM)
- A case-based, problem-based curriculum called the Program for Integrated Learning (PIL)

== Admissions ==
For the medical school class matriculating in 2025, six percent of applicants were accepted, with enrolled students having a mean MCAT score of 512 and a mean undergraduate GPA of 3.76.

== Rankings and faculty ==
In 2026, U.S. News & World Report ranked the college Tier 3 in Best Medical Schools: Research and Tier 3 in Best Medical Schools: Primary Care with a faculty-student ratio of 1.8:1. The College has 2,251 full-time faculty on staff.

== Locations ==
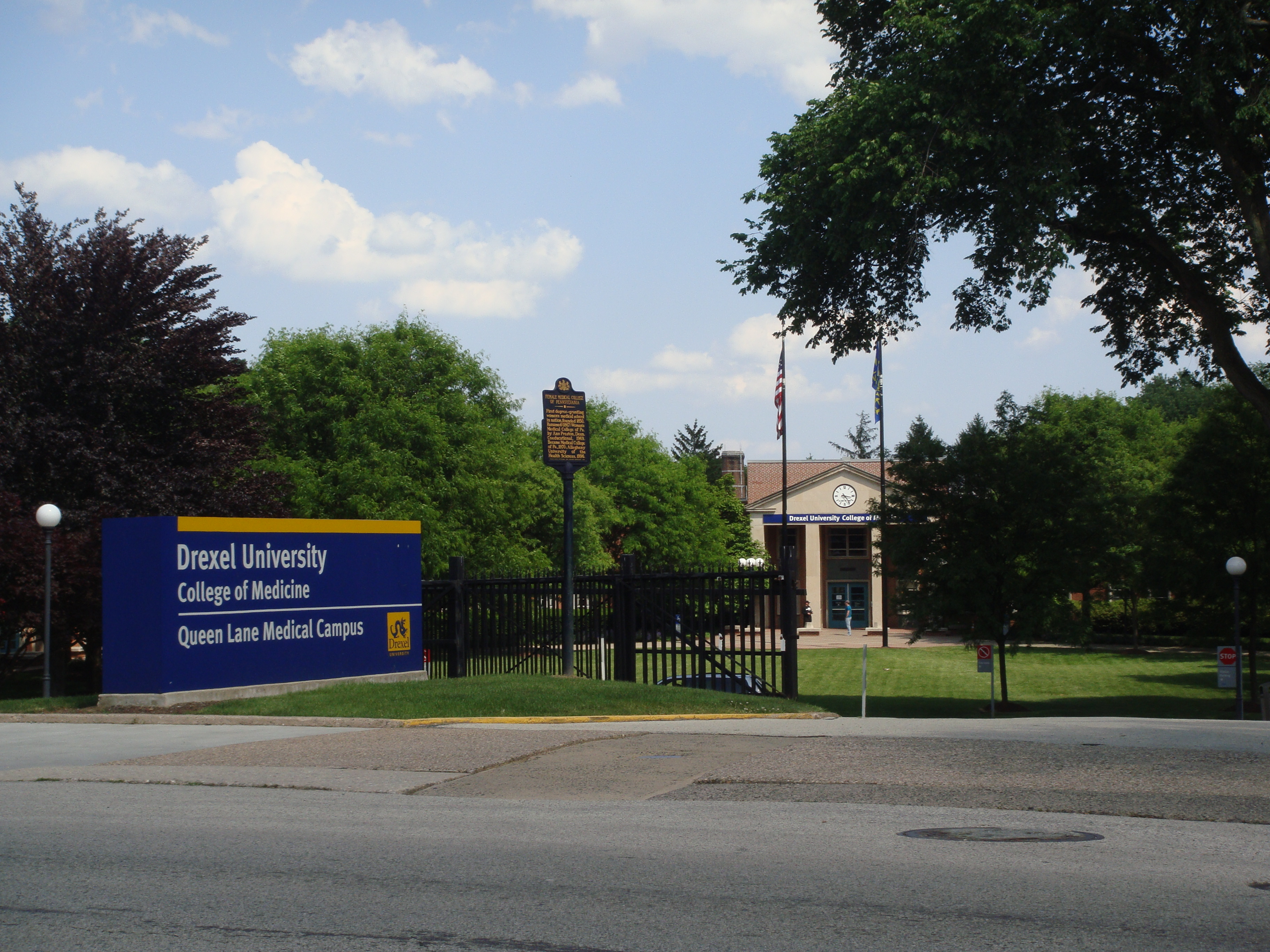
The Queen Lane Campus is located within the East Falls neighborhood of Philadelphia.

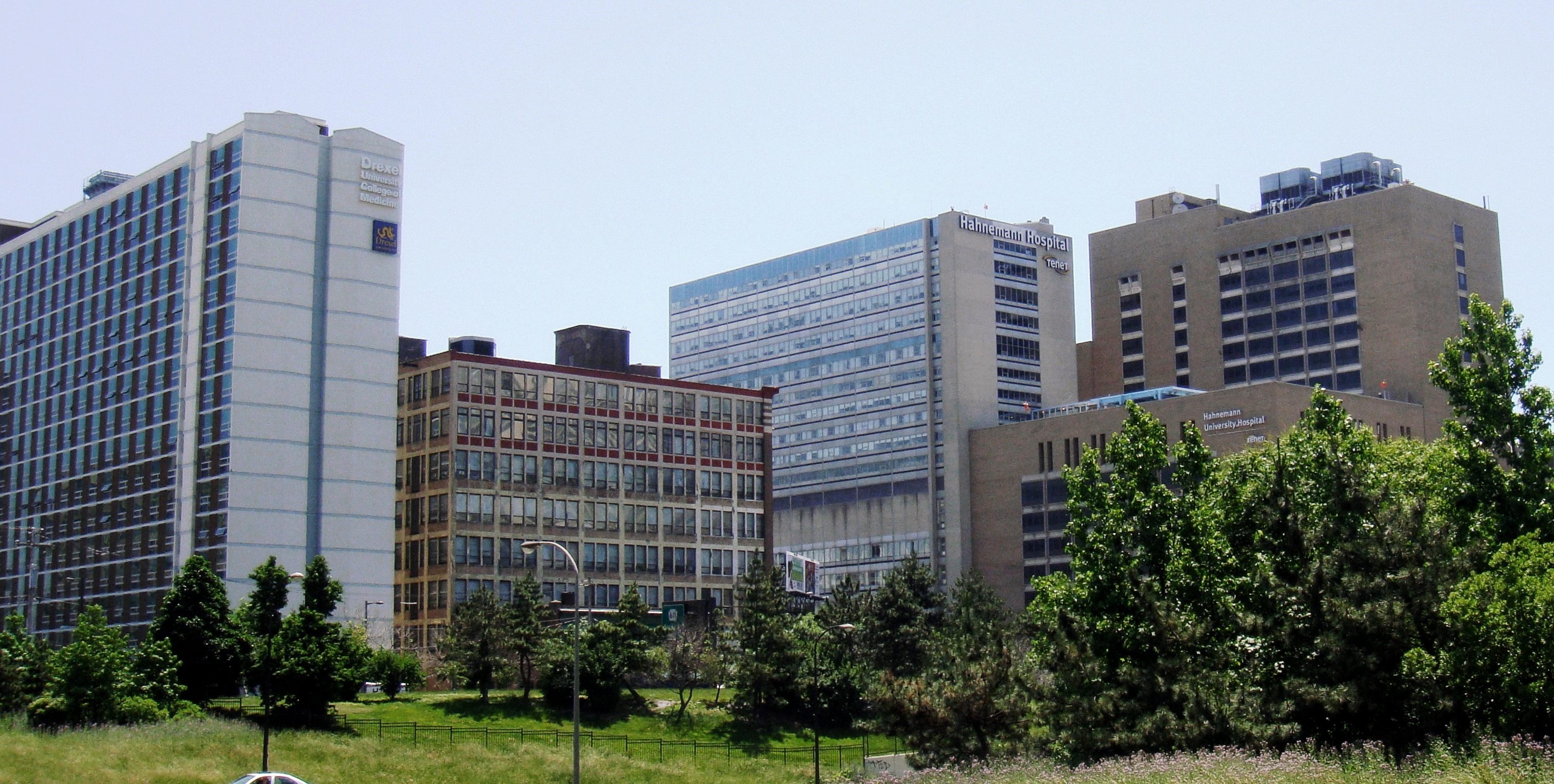
Center City Hahnemann Campus as seen from the I-676 interchange

- Woman's Medical College of Pennsylvania
- U.S. National Register of Historic Places
- Location within Pennsylvania
- Location: 3300 Henry Ave., Philadelphia, Pennsylvania
- Area: 5 acres (2.0 ha)
- Built: 1926
- Architects: Rittner & Shay; Schmidt; Garden & Erikson; Ewing, Cole, Erdman, Cherry
- Architectural style: Colonial Revival, Moderne, International style
- NRHP reference No.: 08000785
- Added to NRHP: November 26, 2008

=== Queen Lane Campus ===
The College of Medicine's main campus was at the Queen Lane campus of the former Woman's Medical College of Pennsylvania. This campus housed first and second-year medical students as well as biomedical graduate students and is located in a suburban-like setting in the East Falls neighborhood of Philadelphia. In 2006 the university finished construction of the 15,000-square-foot (1,400 m^{2}) Student Activities Center. This new wing included an expanded gym, recreation room, book store, and an expanded lecture hall that can accommodate the entire class of approximately 260 in one auditorium. The building was listed on the National Register of Historic Places in 2008.

In 2008, the university broke ground on an addition to the building: The Independence Blue Cross Medical Simulation Center. The simulation center, funded in part through a $2.5 million donation from Independence Blue Cross, features lifelike robots and screen-based simulation programs. The computer-driven robotic mannequins, called high-fidelity patient simulators, exhibit lifelike vital signs, including heartbeats, blood pressures, and body and eye movements. They can be programmed to display a variety of normal and abnormal conditions and to respond realistically to student interventions such as intubation, drug injection, or cardiac defibrillation. They can be programmed to speak or cry out in pain.

=== Center City Hahnemann Campus ===
The Center City Hahnemann Campus, located in downtown Philadelphia, was the main site for the college's clinical education departments in addition to biomedical facilities and other health-science and public health programs. Hahnemann University Hospital anchors the Center City Hahnemann Campus, along with the Outpatient Clinics, Lecture Halls, and Residence Hall. Drexel's Office of Continuing Medical Education offers the only Physician Refresher/Re-Entry Course on the East Coast for physicians intending to re-enter the workforce after years of inactive practice. The program allows physicians to refresh their knowledge or gain additional training in order to re-enter the workforce.

In 1991, the college purchased the former Elk's Lodge BPOE No. 2 Philadelphia Athletic Club building at 306–320 N. Broad Street for $2.35 million. They demolished it the following year to redevelop the site as a parking garage and computer center. The building had been added to the National Register of Historic Places in 1984.

In September 2019, the hospital closed.

=== West Reading Campus ===
Located in Berks County, Pennsylvania, Drexel University College of Medicine at Tower Health is affiliated with Reading Hospital, which is a Magnet Recognized acute care facility. In 2021, Reading Hospital became a 4-year regional campus of the College of Medicine and began training first-year medical students.

=== University City Campus ===
In 2022, the university opened a 12-story, 460,000 square foot Health Sciences Building in University City, where the main campus is located. This building houses the University’s College of Nursing and Health Professions, College of Medicine, and Graduate School of Biomedical Sciences and Professional Studies. In Aug 2023, the university welcomed first and second year MD students in its inaugural year in the building.

After the closure of Hahnemann University Hospital, there was an increased need to consolidate the various Drexel programs that were scattered across the city.

The future of Queen Lane and Hahnemann University Center City campus is undetermined. But with the programs leaving these campuses to move to University City, the sale and closure of these campuses are a possibility.

== Clinical sites ==
The university offers a wide array of clinical sites to its third- and fourth-year students. Operating large urban hospitals and small rural private practices, the university provides numerous opportunities for the students to be exposed to many diverse experiences. During third-year rotations, the students have the option to stay at a particular hospital for the entire year, or rotate among all the various locations throughout the Pennsylvania-New Jersey-Delaware area. Here is a partial list of the various sites:

=== All-year sites ===
- Reading Hospital, Reading, Pennsylvania
- Allegheny General Hospital, Pittsburgh, Pennsylvania
- Wellspan Health, York Hospital, York, Pennsylvania
- Kaiser Permanente, Sacramento, California
- Bayhealth Medical Center, Dover, Delaware
- AtlantiCare Medical Center, Atlantic City, NJ
- UPMC Harrisburg, Harrisburg, Pennsylvania

=== Partial-year sites ===
- Coatesville VA Medical Center, Coatesville, Pennsylvania
- Crozer-Chester Medical Center, Chester, Pennsylvania
- Friends Hospital, Philadelphia, Pennsylvania
- Lancaster General Hospital, Lancaster, Pennsylvania
- Lehigh Valley Hospital–Cedar Crest, Allentown, Pennsylvania
- Mercy Fitzgerald, Darby, Pennsylvania
- St. Christopher's Hospital for Children, Philadelphia, Pennsylvania
- Main Line Health, Wynnewood, Pennsylvania

== Notable alumni ==
The Drexel University College of Medicine and its predecessor medical schools have graduated physicians such as Susan La Flesche Picotte, the first Native American female physician; Anandi Gopal Joshi (the first Indian female physician in the United States); Tabat M. Islambooly (the first Syrian female physician in the United States); Rebecca Cole, the second African-American female physician in the United States; Patricia Robertson, a NASA astronaut and physician; and Sandra Lee, a dermatologist who became an Internet celebrity and star of the TLC TV series Dr. Pimple Popper.

== See also ==
- Medical schools in Pennsylvania
- Pi Upsilon Rho
