= Sandra Lee (dermatologist) =

American dermatologist and YouTuber (born 1970)

- Born: Sandra Siew Pin Lee; December 20, 1970 (age 55); New York City, U.S.
- Education: University of California, Los Angeles (BS); Drexel University (MD)
- Occupation: Dermatologist
- Spouse: Jeffrey Rebish (m. 2000)
- Children: 2

YouTube information
- Channel: Dr. Pimple Popper
- Years active: 2010–present
- Genre: Dermatology
- Subscribers: 9.13 million
- Views: 7.2 billion
- Last updated: September 26, 2026
- Website: www.drpimplepopper.com slmdskincare.com

Sandra Siew Pin Lee-Rebish (née Lee; born December 20, 1970), also known as Dr. Pimple Popper, is an American dermatologist and YouTuber. She is known for her online videos and her TV series Dr. Pimple Popper.

== Early life ==
Lee was born in the Flushing section of Queens, New York City, to Asian parents; her father, a retired dermatologist, is Singaporean while her mother is Malaysian. Her parents immigrated to New York in 1969, and the family relocated to Southern California when Lee was five years old.

Lee attended UCLA as an undergraduate student. During this time, she worked part-time as a medical assistant for an allergist in Downtown Los Angeles. After she graduated from UCLA, Lee attended medical school at the Drexel University College of Medicine and graduated in 1998. She completed her internship in internal medicine at Allegheny General Hospital in Pittsburgh. Lee completed her dermatology residency at Southern Illinois University. After her residency finished, she went to San Diego to further her experience with laser, dermatological, and cosmetic surgery. Lee lives in Upland, California, with her husband, fellow dermatologist Jeffrey C. Rebish (married May 28, 2000), and works at Skin Physicians & Surgeons in Upland.

== Career ==
Lee is a board-certified dermatologist and a fellow of the American Academy of Dermatology, the American Academy of Cosmetic Surgery, the American Society for Dermatologic Surgery, and the American Society for Mohs Surgery.

=== Online video ===
In 2010, Lee began uploading videos to YouTube but did not begin to heavily post content until 2015, after she noticed the popularity of her Instagram videos of skin extractions. In exchange for written client permission to record and post content, Lee offers patients discounted or free treatment. In late 2019 the decision to make future content subscription-based drew criticism. She explained that it was caused by YouTube having blocked advertising in the channel's videos that usually featured unsightly material, and thus the channel needed another source of funding.

=== Skincare ===
In 2017, Lee launched her own line of skincare products, SLMD Skincare Products. Products in the line include an acne cleanser and lotion, clarifying treatment with retinol, and daily moisturizer. Before this, Lee also sold comedo extractors and other merchandise branded with the name of her channel.

=== Television ===
In 2018, Lee signed with TLC to have her own Dr. Pimple Popper TV series, which premiered on July 11. A special Christmas episode of Dr. Pimple Popper, "The 12 Pops of Christmas", aired on December 13, 2018. Season 2 of Dr. Pimple Popper premiered in January 2019, and Season 3 premiered in the United States on July 11, 2019. The fourth season premiered on December 26, 2019. Six seasons including one "Before the Pop" season followed with the ninth season released on April 5, 2023.

== Personal life ==
Lee is married to fellow dermatologist Jeff Rebish. They have two sons.

On April 14, 2026, it was revealed that Lee had suffered a stroke in November 2025 while filming her television show.

== Popular culture ==
- The Comedy Central game show @midnight mentioned her growing Instagram popularity during an opening segment.
- Lee has over 9.13 million people (as of October 2026) subscribed to her YouTube channel, with total views being 7.2 billion and counting. On August 14, 2018, she made a guest appearance on Jimmy Kimmel Live!

== Awards ==
Year	Ceremony	Nominated work	Award	Result	Ref
2019	Critics' Choice Real TV Awards	Herself	Female Star of the Year	Won	
2020	Critics' Choice Real TV Awards	Herself	Female Star of the Year	Won	
2020	American Reality Television Awards	Dr. Pimple Popper	Guilty Pleasure Show	Won	
2021	Critics' Choice Real TV Awards	Herself	Female Star of the Year	Won	
2021	American Reality Television Awards	Herself	Reality Royalty	Won	
2021	American Reality Television Awards	Dr. Pimple Popper	Guilty Pleasure Show	Nominated	
