= Pi Upsilon Rho =

American homeopathy fraternity (defunct)

- ΠΥΡ
- Founded: 1876; 150 years ago Hahnemann Medical College (Chicago)
- Type: Professional
- Affiliation: Independent
- Status: Defunct
- Defunct date: c. 1944
- Emphasis: Homeopathy; medical
- Scope: National
- Flower: ύ
- Publication: The Torch
- Chapters: 7
- Members: 1,194 lifetime
- Headquarters: United States

Pi Upsilon Rho (ΠΥΡ) was an American professional fraternity for homeopathy students. It was established at Hahnemann Medical College in Chicago in 1876 and had five active chapters by 1920. Now defunct, it has been credited as one of the United States' oldest medical fraternities.

== History ==
Pi Upsilon Rho was established as Ustion, a professional fraternity for homeopathy students, at Hahnemann Medical College in 1876. It has been credited as one of the United States' oldest medical fraternities.

A second chapter was added at Ohio State University in 1893. By 1906 it had five active chapters. It changed its name to Pi Upsilon Rho in 1909.

The fraternity's governing body, the Supreme Corpus, would meet annually at the convention of the American Institute of Homeopathy. The fraternity became defunct around 1944.

== Symbols ==
The badge of the society is in the form of a diamond lozenge, with the Greek letters Π, Υ and Ρ across the middle. Above this are three torches and below this are two crossed bones. An image of the badge is at the center of the fraternity's crest.

Chapters were named "Vertebrae", and were designated by Latin numerals.

Officers were named:

- Encephalon (President)
- Medulla Oblongata (Vice-president)
- Calamus Scriptorius (Secretary)
- Optic Thalamus (Treasurer)
- Torcular Herophili (Inductor)

The fraternity's quarterly periodical of the fraternity was The Torch.

== Chapters ==
The fraternity called its chapters "Vertebrae". In the following list, inactive chapters and institutions are in italics.

Chapter	Charter date and range	Institution	Location	Status	Ref.
Prima	1876–c. 1922	Hahnemann Medical College (Chicago)	Chicago, Illinois	Inactive	(Note: The college closed in 1922.)
Tertia	1893–19xx ?	Ohio State University	Columbus, Ohio	Inactive	
Quarta	1901–after 1943	Hahnemann Medical College	Philadelphia, Pennsylvania	Inactive	
Quinta	1902–1906	Denver Homeopathic Medical College	Denver, Colorado	Inactive	
Sexta	1903–c. 1912	Detroit Homeopathic College	Detroit, Michigan	Consolidated	(Note: When the Detroit Homeopathic College closed in 1912, the chapter consolidated with Octa.)
Septa	1905–19xx ?	New York Medical College	Valhalla, New York	Inactive	(Note: Chapter formed at the New York Homeopathic Medical College, now New York Medical College.)
Octa	1906–19xx ?	University of Michigan	Ann Arbor, Michigan	Inactive	

== See also ==
- List of defunct medical schools in the United States
- Professional fraternities and sororities
