= Dr. Pimple Popper (TV series) =

American TV series

- Genre: Reality
- Starring: Dr. Sandra Lee
- Music by: APM Music
- Country of origin: United States
- Original language: English
- No. of seasons: 10
- No. of episodes: 111

Production
- Executive producers: Casey Brumels; Brad Kuhlman; Scott Cooper; Mike Kane
- Running time: 42 minutes
- Production company: Ping Pong Productions

Original release
- Network: TLC; Discovery+
- Release: January 3, 2018 – August 23, 2023
- Network: Lifetime
- Release: April 21, 2025 – present

Dr. Pimple Popper is an American reality television series airing on TLC. The series, starring dermatologist and Internet celebrity Dr. Sandra Lee, follows her as she treats patients with unusual cases of facial and skin disorders at her clinic Skin Physicians & Surgeons in the Inland Empire city of Upland, California. The show started with an hour-long special on January 3, 2018 before the first season aired on July 11, 2018.

Initially airing at 10:00 p.m. Eastern Time on Wednesdays, Dr. Pimple Popper became the top-rated cable program in its time slot among women between ages 25–54. On August 14, the day before the final episode for Season 1 aired, TLC announced it had renewed the series for a second season, with new episodes set to air in January 2019. Another hour-long special was aired on December 13, 2018, before the second season began on January 3, 2019 with its episodes moved to 9 p.m. Eastern Time on Thursdays. Beginning part-way through the fifth season, new episodes became available on the Discovery+ streaming service, before returning to TLC for the sixth season. A spin-off series titled Dr. Pimple Popper: Before the Pop premiered on September 3, 2020.

The ninth and final season premiered on April 5, 2023 in the program's sixth year. A follow-up series, Dr. Pimple Popper: Breaking Out, debuted on Lifetime on April 21, 2025. A 20-episode second season of Breaking Out has been ordered.

== Dr. Pimple Popper episodes ==
Season	Episodes	Originally released	
Season	Episodes	First released	Last released
1	Special	January 3, 2018	
1	6	July 11, 2018	August 15, 2018
2	Special	December 13, 2018	
2	10	January 3, 2019	March 7, 2019
3	4	July 11, 2019	August 1, 2019
4	6	December 26, 2019	January 30, 2020
Before	10	September 3, 2020	October 29, 2020
5	Special	December 21, 2020	
5	10	December 28, 2020	March 1, 2021
6	10	July 14, 2021	September 15, 2021
7	Special	December 8, 2021	
7	10	February 16, 2022	April 20, 2022
8	10	July 13, 2022	September 14, 2022
9	Special	December 15, 2022	
9	20	April 5, 2023	August 23, 2023

=== Season 1 (2018) ===
No. overall	No. in season	Title	Original release date	U.S. viewers (millions)
1	–	"Dr. Pimple Popper"	January 3, 2018	1.11
Angelina of Sacramento, California has a large lipoma under her left breast that has affected her self-esteem for the past six years. Delano of Houston, Texas has a giant lump on his back that prevents him from getting regular jobs and rendered him homeless on some occasions. Carla from Mississippi wishes to have her pilar cysts removed from her scalp. Brenda of Los Angeles, California has a golf ball-sized lump on her forehead that has hampered her social life and career advancement.
2	1	"The Lipoma Whisperer"	July 11, 2018	1.80
Melissa of Sioux Falls, South Dakota has lived with a large lipoma on the right side of her neck for years, forcing her to wear sweatshirts to conceal it from everyone. Tyler of Litchfield, New Hampshire has cysts on his forehead, but his family's history of cancer has discouraged him from having them diagnosed. Tahj's body is covered in painful boils. Amber of Los Angeles has keloids on her ears that have given her years of discomfort.
3	2	"The World's Largest Lump"	July 18, 2018	1.83
Ronan of New York City has a cyst above his left knee that has given him excruciating pain in his job as a flight attendant. Amber of Ada, Oklahoma suffers from hidradenitis suppurativa that leaves her clothes soaked in drainage. Sandy has a golf ball-sized lipoma on her neck that grew back after a previous surgery. Kristy of San Angelo, Texas has what is thought to be a milium on her left eyelid that gives her discomfort and affects her vision.
4	3	"The Cyst Persists"	July 25, 2018	2.02
Mary of San Antonio, Texas has fatty tumors that makes her left leg disproportionate from her body and wants them removed before the day of her daughter's wedding. Physical trainer Anthony has a grape-sized cyst between his eyebrows that other doctors have refused to treat due to its proximity in the "triangle of death". Shane has a grapefruit-sized lipoma on his back. Brandi of Cincinnati, Ohio has an unusual lipoma above her left breast that has hindered her love life.
5	4	"The Curious Case of the Pooting Cyst"	August 1, 2018	2.37
Diane of Lake Mary, Florida suffers from hereditary neurofibromatosis, which has prevented her from having children out of fear of passing the disease to them. Will of Hinesville, Georgia has a golf ball-sized cyst on his right shoulder. Anthony of South Bend, Indiana has a tennis ball-sized lipoma in the back of his neck. Kai-Elle, a 47-year-old transgender New Yorker, has lived with spider veins on her legs throughout her life.
6	5	"A Lipoma Jackpot"	August 8, 2018	2.10
Belinda of Pomona, California has a lipoma on her back that limits her neck and arm movement. Nicole of Portland, Oregon has a lump under her right arm caused by issues while breastfeeding her daughter 11 years ago, and she wants it removed before her wedding. Adela is a 62-year-old woman with over 400 seborrheic keratoses that developed after she gave birth to her daughter. Nick of Seattle, Washington has seven lipomas on his body and needs them removed professionally after he removed one on his own.
7	6	"An American Tail"	August 15, 2018	2.09
Taylor of St. Louis, Missouri has had a lump on her buttocks since birth that regenerated after a previous operation two years ago, and discovers that it is an extremely rare case of spinal dysraphism. John from Maui County, Hawaii has a breast-shaped lipoma on the right side of his waist. Noelle of Boise, Idaho wants her ear lobes restored after having stretched them to wear ear tunnels for years.

=== Season 2 (2019) ===
No. overall	No. in season	Title	Original release date	U.S. viewers (millions)
8	–	"The 12 Pops of Christmas"	December 13, 2018	1.50
Jaila has keloids on her ears that are constantly affected by weather. Justin from Roxboro, North Carolina has two cysts on his upper right arm that have grown into bumps shaped like a snowman. Christina from Orlando, Florida has steatocystomas on her neck and wants to get rid of them. Farrah has a two-year-old facial cyst that she wants removed. Doris from London, Ontario, Canada has a 55-year-old dilated pore of Winer that is situated in front of her right ear. Randi from Arkansas has xanthelasma deposits around her eyes. Kenneth has had a lipoma for 10 years that has become a large hump on his back. Connie from Miami, Florida has pimples and blackheads all over her face and back, and is discovered to also have steatocystomas. Felix has had a pilar cyst on his head for about 25 years that he has been hiding with hats. Jean Marcus has familial multiple lipomatosis on his arms and chest that have affected his everyday life and caused him to stand differently. Jennifer from Knoxville, Tennessee comes in to have the skin tags around on her neck removed because she cannot wear necklaces, especially a special gifted one from her mother. Nick has a lump of coal in his cheek which he blames on chimneys.
9	1	"Nose No Bounds"	January 3, 2019	2.49
April of Deatsville, Alabama has familial multiple lipomatosis, which multiplied on her forearms after giving birth to her eldest son Hunter, and she becomes concerned when he develops one on his thigh. Genner from the Philippines suffers from rhinophyma, which has adversely affected his everyday life. Chris from La Mirada, California has a bump on his head and psoriasis all over his body that has put a strain on his marriage.
10	2	"Tumor Takeover"	January 10, 2019	2.79
Matt from Aurora, Colorado was born with neurofibromatosis type I that has resulted in numerous tumors all over his body that have affected his job as a courier and is concerned that they may be cancerous. Yamileth is an exotic dancer from Los Angeles who has a large cyst on the right side of her neck that has forced her to wear scarves and use her hair to cover it. Pat is a 66-year-old woman who has multiple seborrheic keratoses and wants those on her face and neck removed. Jennifer from Hawthorne, California is an aspiring voice actress who has a "unicorn bump" on her forehead and two smaller bumps on her scalp that have hindered her self-esteem.
11	3	"The Last Unicorn"	January 17, 2019	2.84
Louis from Superior, Wisconsin is a 70-year-old army veteran with a rare disease that he picked up during the Gulf War that causes his skin to develop hyperkeratosis and ichthyosis, resulting in years of agonizing pain. Irais from Laguna Hills, California has a large pilar cyst on the right side of her head that has affected her everyday life and caused her daughters to be bullied in school. Johnny from Valencia, California has a large lipoma on the left side on his back.
12	4	"Sisters Lumpity Lump Lump"	January 24, 2019	2.99
Amber from Northampton, Massachusetts suffers from Brooke-Spiegler syndrome, which has resulted in hundreds of tumors on her face and armpits. Antonio from Sugar Land, Texas has a giant lipoma on his back that is near his spinal cord. Cheri and Janice are sisters with lumps on their arms; Cheri has a cyst on her right shoulder, while Janice has a lipoma on her left bicep. Tatiana from Danbury, Connecticut has a nevus lipomatosus superficialis under her buttocks.
13	5	"Every Rosacea Has Its Thorn"	January 31, 2019	3.10
Patrick from Lincoln, Montana has an advanced form of rhinophyma caused by rosacea that developed from years of construction work under the sun and his use of blood-thinning medicine may affect the operation on his nose. Lauren from Los Angeles and Aziza from Baltimore, Maryland have identical ganglion cysts on their left wrists. Joe from Detroit, Michigan has a large cyst on his forehead that grew over the past year.
14	6	"Popping Popeye"	February 7, 2019	3.43
Lisa from Litchfield, New Hampshire has a cutaneous horn on the back of her head that has caused her years of pain and she wants it removed before her wedding day. Victor has a large cyst on his chest. Chuck of Costa Mesa, California has a multi-lobulated lipoma on his right bicep that has affected his job in metal works. Jonathan and Christian of South Gate, California are brothers with lipomas - one on Jonathan's right side and one on Christian's back.
15	7	"Scared Cyst-less"	February 14, 2019	2.85
Taylore from Memphis, Tennessee has keloids on the tips of her ears that have weighed down her self-esteem. Jose from Adelanto, California has a baseball-sized lipoma on the right side of his forehead that requires a CT scan as a precaution before surgery. Ken from Bay Springs, Mississippi has multiple types of cysts on his back, chest, and head, and his fear of needles has him nervous about getting them removed.
16	8	"A Lipoma Is Born"	February 21, 2019	3.17
Barb from Visalia, California has a large heart-shaped lipoma that stayed on her back after her gastric bypass surgery a year earlier. Bob from Pembroke Pines, Florida has two giant elastofibroma dorsis on his back that require a CT scan due to their proximity under the scapulas. Hilda from South Gate, California has multiple hidrocystomas around her eyes that resulted in her depression that cost her her job and her house. Art from Riverside, California has a unicorn cyst on his forehead that he has kept for nine years due to his fear of doctors.
17	9	"Mic Drop Pop!"	February 28, 2019	2.96
Josh from Woodbine, Georgia has a golf ball sized epidermoid cyst on the right side of his forehead that developed from a near-fatal car accident 17 years ago. TJ has a pilomatricoma on the left side of his back that has affected his job as a car salesman. Brittney from Memphis, Tennessee has multiple neurofibromatoses all over her body that were inherited from her late mother and she needs them removed before her wedding. Luis from Roseville, California has a large lipoma on his right shoulder that has him concerned it might be cancerous. This episode is followed by a 10-minute preview of the podiatry series My Feet Are Killing Me. Reruns of this episode include a tribute to Brittney who died two months after this episode aired.
18	10	"Runaway Bump, Never Coming Back?"	March 7, 2019	3.24
Leonard from Holly Ridge, North Carolina has a large lipoma on his left shoulder that has not healed after scraping it, and his fear of doctors has kept him from getting it removed. Brandon from Harrisburg, Pennsylvania has multiple pilar cysts on his head, which has him concerned due to his family's history of cancer and he wants them removed before his wedding. Jess from Harford County, Maryland has a bump on her right buttock that grew after she fell on a flight of stairs, but an examination shows no indications of lipoma or any type of growth.

=== Season 3 (2019) ===
No. overall	No. in season	Title	Original release date	U.S. viewers (millions)
19	1	"Sleepless in Steatocystoma"	July 11, 2019	3.21
Jennifer from Philadelphia has large keloids on both ears that have grown for more than a decade, causing headaches and vertigo. Juliet from Bothell, Washington has steatocystomas and eruptive vellus hair cysts on her neck and chest that have greatly affected her self-esteem. Gerald from Chicago has a very large lump on his left middle finger.
20	2	"The Incredible Shrinking Lipoma"	July 18, 2019	2.45
Gerald has the chondroid syringoma on his finger removed by orthopedic surgeon Dr. James Lilley at Casa Colina Hospital in Pomona, California. Vinnie from Carbondale, Pennsylvania has a large birthmark on the right side of his neck that has formed a congenital nevus, resulting in bullying and harassment by his classmates. Leta from Montgomery, Alabama has a lipoma on her left thigh that she wants to remove before her wedding.
21	3	"Hips Don't Lie"	July 25, 2019	2.51
Rhonda from Orlando, Florida has multiple cysts on her head that she struggles to hide with her hair. Fred from Lexington, Kentucky has dry bumps on his hands that cause discomfort, especially when he washes his hands. Kevin from Charleston, South Carolina has a lipoma on his left hip that has given him difficulty in dressing up.
22	4	"Romancing The Lump"	August 1, 2019	2.35
Heather from Kissimmee, Florida has a lipoma on the back of her right thigh and is concerned about getting it removed, as she also has several keloids on her body. Jesse and Nelda, siblings from Corpus Christi, Texas, have hereditary hidradenitis suppurativa and learn that there is no real cure for their skin disorder. Margarita from Fort Worth, Texas has epidermal nevus behind her right ear that she refuses to show to her children. Paul from Waller, Texas has a large lipoma behind his neck that has hindered his head movement and affected his job in delivering RVs.

=== Season 4 (2019–20) ===
No. overall	No. in season	Title	Original release date	U.S. viewers (millions)
23	1	"The Record Breaking Lump!"	December 26, 2019	2.29
Tim from Walstonburg, North Carolina has a 12 lb. lipoma on his back that has affected his work as a farmer, as well as his social life. Daniel from Long Beach, California suffers from psoriasis that covers 95% of his body. Gloriana from the Las Vegas Valley has a cyst on her right shoulder while her mother Yolanda has a large lipoma on the left side of her waist.
24	2	"peh-DUN-kyoo-LAY-ted"	January 2, 2020	2.80
Traci from Coeur d'Alene, Idaho suffers from trichoepithelioma on her face that has impacted her self-esteem since childhood. Ravon from Clarksville, Tennessee has a lipoma dangling on his right thigh. David from Alhambra, California suffers from rhinophyma on the left side of his nose and a bump under his right eye that may be cancerous.
25	3	"Eggs Lipoma"	January 9, 2020	2.67
David's bump under his right eye is revealed to be a basal-cell carcinoma, which he has removed through Mohs surgery. Nicole from Sacramento, California has multiple steatocystomas all over her body that she struggles to hide, especially on her neck. Steve from Michigan has a lipoma on his forehead that has prevented him from wearing hats to hide it. Allen from Cottonwood, Arizona has a lipoma on his left bicep that he has struggled with in his career as a car restorer.
26	4	"Adventures in Pimplepopping"	January 16, 2020	3.00
Inoke from Sacramento, California has a 9 lb. lipoma on his right shoulder that has prevented him from participating in dancing with his family and the Fijian community in his town. Delano from the first Special returns to the clinic, as the lymphangioma on his back has returned. Reed from Las Vegas has multiple eruptive vellus hair cysts and steatocystoma multiplex on his chest that has affected his self-esteem.
27	5	"Dr. Lee Nose Best!"	January 23, 2020	3.01
Tony from Clinton, Tennessee suffers from rhinophyma as a side effect from taking a cardiac medicine five years ago, hindering his ability to interact with people at his thrift store. Kevin from Petaluma, California has an epidermoid cyst on the left side on his jaw that has interfered with his concentration on his job as an electrician and his social life. Marie from New Jersey has a lipoma on her forehead that has affected her relationship with her girlfriend. Tommy from Monett, Missouri grew a large lipoma on his left thigh after suffering a torn leg muscle four years ago, limiting his work as a carpenter. This episode is dedicated in memory of Kevin who died eight months before this episode aired.
28	6	"Warning: Cystem Shutdown!"	January 30, 2020	2.77
Gerard from Brooklyn, New York has familial multiple lipomatosis on his body that he wants removed, but he also has Factor V Leiden, which may increase the risk of blood clotting during the procedure. Gina from Wilmington, North Carolina suffers from multiple lesions on her body that other doctors have diagnosed as a mental condition, as she constantly picks on her skin. Eric from Cheektowaga, New York developed a golf ball sized pilar cyst on his head from a construction accident eight years ago.

=== Before the Pop (2020) ===
On August 5, 2020, it was announced that a spin-off series titled Dr. Pimple Popper: Before the Pop would premiere on September 3, 2020.

No.	Title	Original release date	U.S. viewers (millions)
1	"Video Chat, Pop, Splat!"	September 3, 2020	1.01
2	"A Growth to Remember"	September 3, 2020	1.01
3	"Mystery Blisters: Diagnosis Unknown"	September 10, 2020	1.34
4	"A Nightmare on Skin Street"	September 17, 2020	1.47
5	"Lump Overboard"	September 24, 2020	1.43
6	"The Enormous Nose Nodules"	October 1, 2020	1.22
7	"Split Decisions"	October 8, 2020	0.96
8	"Itchy, Itchy, Ya-Ya, Da-Da"	October 15, 2020	1.27
9	"Twin Peaks"	October 22, 2020	0.85
10	"100 Lumps and Counting"	October 29, 2020	0.92

=== Season 5 (2020–21) ===
No. overall	No. in season	Title	Original release date	U.S. viewers (millions) (Note: Episodes moved to Discovery+ from the fifth episode and do not include televised ratings.)
29	–	"Season's Squeezings"	December 21, 2020	1.19
Dr. Lee's office is busy on its last day before Christmas. Tywana from Las Vegas has a large lipoma on her forehead. Jeff has several epidermoid cysts, both on his back and in a corner of his right eye. Marilyn has a large lipoma on her right arm. Liz, a mother of six, has dozens of steatocystomas, and brings her 5-year-old daughter Elsie, who has a growing lump on her forehead. Kazuyo comes from Hawaii with a lipoma on her right arm pressing on a nerve, causing her problems in her job as a hairstylist. Tim from Michigan, who works as a Santa during the Christmas season, has a large growth on his upper neck that requires a CT scan and proves to be an epidermoid cyst; after its removal, he dresses as Santa for the office Christmas party, with Liz and Elsie also attending.
30	1	"Leave It to Nevus"	December 28, 2020	1.64
At the start of the episode, Dr. Lee reviews some of the changes to her practice brought on by the COVID-19 pandemic. Monica from Milford, Illinois has a large birthmark, specifically nevus sebaceous, on her face that has been resistant to past treatments. Jackie from Valparaiso, Indiana has a large lipoma on her right shoulder. Reggie from Moreno Valley, California suffers from acne keloidalis nuchae on the back of his head, which has caused him severe discomfort for more than 20 years, and Dr. Lee expresses doubts as to whether she can help him.
31	2	"Big Pop on Campus"	January 4, 2021	1.93
Dr. Lee refers Reggie to Dr. Sanusi Umar, a dermatologist from Manhattan Beach, California who has experience dealing with Reggie's condition, and he removes the keloids with Dr. Lee looking on. Che'Re from Dallas has an epidermoid cyst on her face that has affected her self-image to the point that she is reluctant to enter into a relationship. Juan from Freer, Texas has large cysts on his neck.
32	3	"Cystic River"	January 11, 2021	1.64
Dennis from Wyandotte, Michigan has had multiple large pilar cysts on his scalp that have affected his life for years, and required two separate procedures to remove. Juan from Tustin, California has tuberous sclerosis associated with his epilepsy, most prominently on his nose, and also has what proved to be an epidermoid cyst near one eye. Natalie from Atlanta has multiple bumps on her arms, legs, and trunk that Dr. Lee suspects were caused by her frequent itching.
33	4	"Don't Sweat It!"	January 18, 2021	1.66
Audrey from Shawnigan Lake, British Columbia has multiple steatocystomas that have caused her great pain; her treatment is complicated by having Crohn's disease and being a kidney transplant recipient. Felicia from Detroit has a large lump on her forehead, eventually proven to be a lipoma, that became scarred when she squeezed it years earlier. Krista from Las Vegas has suffered from hyperhidrosis (i.e., uncontrollable sweating) for years.
34	5	"Pain in the Neck"	January 25, 2021	N/A
John from Marshall, Illinois has a large lipoma on his throat that he fears may eventually suffocate him; the lump's location under the platysma muscle is a concern for Dr. Lee. Shoshana from Palm Springs, California has a lipoma on her forehead that has affected her self-esteem and social life. Ashley from Fairdale, West Virginia suffers from three serious skin conditions that have greatly affected her life as a young mother—hidradenitis suppurativa, guttate psoriasis, and Hailey–Hailey disease.
35	6	"Cyster, Cyster"	February 1, 2021	N/A
Yaellie, a 9-year-old from Hotchkiss, Colorado, suffers from psoriasis that has made her a subject of teasing. Mark from Ligonier, Pennsylvania has a large lipoma near an armpit that has interfered with his work in his furniture business. Stacie and Tracie, twins from National City, California, each have three large pilar cysts on their scalps.
36	7	"Split Decision"	February 8, 2021	N/A
37	8	"The Fault in Our Scars"	February 15, 2021	N/A
38	9	"Comedone Sail Away"	February 22, 2021	N/A
JD from Thomaston, Georgia has an extremely large keloid hanging from his left earlobe that has complicated his wearing of earplugs needed for his job and caused self-esteem issues. Julie from Carmel Valley, California has a large lipoma on her back that has grown to the point that she has had her own self-esteem issues. Dave from Warwick, Rhode Island has two epidermoid cysts on his neck and what Dr. Lee believes to be a myxoid cyst on his right pinky; she removes the neck cysts but recommends that he see a hand surgeon for the finger cyst.
39	10	"A Spoonful of Cyst"	March 1, 2021	N/A

=== Season 6 (2021) ===
No. overall	No. in season	Title	Original release date	U.S. viewers (millions)
40	1	"My Giant Nose Is Killing Me"	July 14, 2021	1.78
41	2	"The Lipoma Psychic"	July 21, 2021	1.90
42	3	"Thick-Skinned"	July 28, 2021	1.40
43	4	"Numbing Nevus"	August 4, 2021	1.36
44	5	"Driving Miss Lumpy"	August 11, 2021	1.77
45	6	"The Exorcyst"	August 18, 2021	1.64
46	7	"Shoulder Boulder"	August 25, 2021	1.77
47	8	"Brain Pimple"	September 1, 2021	1.72
48	9	"Alligator Skin"	September 8, 2021	1.65
49	10	"My Third Eye"	September 15, 2021	1.62

=== Season 7 (2022) ===
No. overall	No. in season	Title	Original release date	U.S. viewers (millions)
50	–	"A Pimple Carol"	December 8, 2021	1.03
51	1	"Lookin' for Love in Lumpy Places"	February 16, 2022	1.64
52	2	"The Incredible Bulk"	February 23, 2022	1.45
53	3	"Raw Meat Mass"	March 2, 2022	1.31
54	4	"The Never-Ending Keloids"	March 9, 2022	1.35
55	5	"Cyst Pits"	March 16, 2022	1.35
56	6	"Hard Knot Life"	March 23, 2022	1.45
57	7	"Bubble, Bubble, Ear's in Trouble!"	March 30, 2022	1.53
58	8	"Once, Twice, Three Times a Keloid"	April 6, 2022	1.61
59	9	"Scarry Scarry Night"	April 13, 2022	1.37
60	10	"My Brainlike Bump"	April 20, 2022	1.64

=== Season 8 (2022) ===
No. overall	No. in season	Title	Original release date	U.S. viewers (millions)
61	1	"Booty and the Beach"	July 13, 2022	1.32
62	2	"Poop! (There It Is)"	July 20, 2022	1.27
63	3	"Do Iguanas Get Pimples Too?"	July 27, 2022	1.33
64	4	"Alligator Arms"	August 3, 2022	1.24
65	5	"Mötley Cÿst"	August 10, 2022	1.28
66	6	"A Head of Cauliflower Bumps"	August 17, 2022	1.22
67	7	"The Wind Beneath My Nose Bumps"	August 24, 2022	1.35
68	8	"Stucco On You"	August 31, 2022	1.44
69	9	"Fast Times at Nevus High"	September 7, 2022	1.34
70	10	"My Octopus Lipoma"	September 14, 2022	1.24

=== Season 9 (2023) ===
No. overall	No. in season	Title	Original release date	U.S. viewers (millions)
71	–	"With Every Cyst-mas Card I Write"	December 15, 2022	1.08
72	1	"Holy Cyst?!"	April 5, 2023	1.33
73	2	"Nevus and Bump-Head"	April 12, 2023	1.13
74	3	"Cyst Over Troubled Water"	April 19, 2023	1.22
75	4	"Ear Brain"	April 26, 2023	1.12
76	5	"Bumpshakalaka"	May 3, 2023	1.15
77	6	"Plum Nose"	May 10, 2023	1.04
78	7	"Pig Snout"	May 17, 2023	1.23
79	8	"Amputation Deliberation"	May 24, 2023	1.14
80	9	"Zombie Skin"	May 31, 2023	1.17
81	10	"Leaky Legs"	June 7, 2023	1.14
82	11	"My Demon Bumps"	June 21, 2023	1.03
83	12	"Troop Lipoma Hills"	June 28, 2023	1.15
84	13	"Monster in the Mirror"	July 5, 2023	N/A
85	14	"Keloid-Con"	July 12, 2023	N/A
86	15	"Veiny Balloons"	July 19, 2023	N/A
87	16	"Scaly Mermaid Skin"	July 26, 2023	N/A
88	17	"Crazy, Stupid, Lump"	August 2, 2023	1.11
89	18	"California Bumpin'"	August 9, 2023	N/A
90	19	"Quadripple Nipple"	August 16, 2023	1.27
91	20	"Tales From the Cyst"	August 23, 2023	0.97

== Dr. Pimple Popper: Breaking Out episodes ==
Season	Episodes	Originally released	
Season	Episodes	First released	Last released
1	20	April 21, 2025	August 25, 2025
2	20	April 20, 2026	August 17, 2026

=== Season 1 (2025) ===
No. overall	No. in season	Title	Original release date
1	1	"Lessons in Pimple Popping"	April 21, 2025
2	2	"A Juicy Secret"	April 28, 2025
3	3	"Superglue to the Rescue"	May 5, 2025
4	4	"Call Me Big Popper"	May 12, 2025
5	5	"Senior Cyst-izen"	May 19, 2025
6	6	"Jaw Dropper"	May 26, 2025
7	7	"Holey Moley"	June 2, 2025
8	8	"Tag Team My Bumps"	June 9, 2025
9	9	"Triangle of Death"	June 16, 2025
10	10	"Nurse Bumpy Head"	June 23, 2025
11	11	"Psoria-Sisters"	June 30, 2025
12	12	"Buffalo Hump Bump"	July 7, 2025
13	13	"My Head Laid An Egg"	July 14, 2025
14	14	"Needle Little Help"	July 21, 2025
15	15	"Bye Bye Booty Bump"	July 28, 2025
16	16	"Hex Marks The Spot"	August 4, 2025
17	17	"Third Eye Blinded"	August 4, 2025
18	18	"Beach Bump"	August 11, 2025
19	19	"My Unlovely Lady Lumps"	August 18, 2025
20	20	"Lump in My Throat"	August 25, 2025

=== Season 2 (2026) ===
No. overall	No. in season	Title	Original release date
21	1	"A Mother's Lump"	April 20, 2026
22	2	"Gone in Cyst-y Seconds"	April 27, 2026
23	3	"A Cheeky Bump"	May 4, 2026
24	4	"The Danger Triangle"	May 11, 2026
25	5	"A Bronx Bump"	May 18, 2026
26	6	"It's All In The Hips"	May 25, 2026
27	7	"Backcountry Bump"	June 1, 2026
28	8	"A Pain In The Bump"	June 8, 2026
29	9	"Life Lesions"	June 15, 2026
30	10	"Retraining The Brain"	June 22, 2026
31	11	"Two Derms Are Better Than One"	June 29, 2026
32	12	"Painless Lee and Fearless Townley"	July 6, 2026
33	13	"Cleared for Surgery!"	July 13, 2026
34	14	"A Nosey Nuisance"	July 20, 2026
35	15	"Hand Me That Scalpel!"	July 27, 2026
36	16	"Hiding Behind a Wig"	August 3, 2026
37	17	"POP Star"	August 10, 2026
38	18	"Looking for Love"	August 10, 2026
39	19	"That's Not the Nose I Recognize!"	August 17, 2026
40	20	"'Til Next Time, Partner"	August 17, 2026

== Webisodes ==
=== This Is Zit ===
Dr. Pimple Popper: This Is Zit is an online series available on TLC's website and Facebook. Each three- to six-minute episode focuses on a particular procedure done by Dr. Lee.

==== Season 1 ====
No.	Title	Original release date	Length
1	"Tackling An Epidermoid Cyst"	January 3, 2018	4:00
2	"Bye Bye Blackheads"	January 3, 2018	3:00
3	"A Pilar Cyst And A Button Blackhead Are No Match For Dr. Pimple Popper"	January 4, 2018	4:00
4	"A Life-Changing Lipoma Removal"	January 4, 2018	4:00
5	"A Persistent Cyst"	January 4, 2018	4:00
6	"A Little Epidermoid Cyst Never Hurt Anyone"	January 4, 2018	3:00
7	"A Head-Strong Pilar Cyst"	January 12, 2018	4:00

==== Season 2 ====
No.	Title	Original release date	Length
1	"A Spine-Tingling Cyst"	July 11, 2018	5:00
2	"A Soaked Cyst"	July 11, 2018	5:00
3	"This Lipoma Looks Like Chicken"	July 11, 2018	5:00
4	"A Very Buttery Steatocystoma"	July 11, 2018	5:00
5	"A Rock Hard Dilated Pore Of Winer"	July 11, 2018	6:00
6	"A Pesky Pop"	July 11, 2018	5:00
7	"The Sac That Kept Coming Back"	July 11, 2018	5:00
8	"Back To Back Cyst Removals"	July 11, 2018	5:00
9	"The Lipoma That Looked Like Bacon"	July 11, 2018	5:00

==== Season 3 ====
No.	Title	Original release date	Length
1	"Destroying This Grape Keloid With Frostbite"	December 14, 2018	4:00
2	"This Cheek Cyst Keeps Expanding"	December 14, 2018	6:00
3	"This Ear Milia Looks Like Bird Seeds"	December 14, 2018	5:00
4	"Satisfying Blackhead Bonanza"	December 14, 2018	5:00
5	"Misleading Iceberg Cyst"	December 14, 2018	5:00
6	"New Mom's Inflamed Cyst"	December 14, 2018	5:00
7	"Mama Squishy's Lemon Custard Steatocystomas"	December 14, 2018	5:00

==== Season 4 ====
No.	Title	Original release date	Length
1	"Cyst Hide And Go Seek"	February 15, 2019	5:00
2	"Dilated Pore Of Winer Pothole"	February 15, 2019	5:00
3	"Golfball-Sized Neck Cyst"	February 15, 2019	5:00
4	"Blackheads On Blackheads"	February 15, 2019	5:00
5	"Chest Jungle Full Of Diamonds"	February 15, 2019	5:00
6	"Face Full Of Steatocystoma Skittles"	February 15, 2019	5:00
7	"This Cheeky Cyst Must Go"	February 15, 2019	5:00

==== Season 5 ====
No.	Title	Original release date	Length
1	"This Eyelid Blackhead Is Relentless"	July 4, 2019	7:00
2	"Bump Ready To Burst"	July 19, 2019	8:00
3	"Steatocystoma Rainbow"	July 26, 2019	8:00
4	"Total Blackhead Extermination"	August 2, 2019	8:00

==== Season 6 ====
No.	Title	Original release date	Length
1	"Fighting With A 5-Year-Old Lipoma"	December 13, 2019	8:00
2	"Can This Back Lipoma Fly?"	December 13, 2019	8:00
3	"Farewell To Family Of Pilar Cysts"	December 13, 2019	8:00
4	"Return Of The Blackhead BFF"	December 13, 2019	8:00
5	"Blackhead Marathon Blues"	December 13, 2019	8:00

==== Season 7 ====
No.	Title	Original release date	Length
1	"Squeezing Some Steatocystomas"	July 10, 2020	7:00
2	"Pesky Upper Back Lump"	July 17, 2020	8:00
3	"The Third Eyeball"	July 24, 2020	7:00
4	"A Boston Cherry Cyst"	July 31, 2020	6:00
5	"Blackhead Bonanza"	August 7, 2020	6:00
6	"Flattening The Forehead"	August 14, 2020	7:00
7	"Attack Of The Back Lipoma"	August 21, 2020	7:00
8	"Ejecting An Epidermoid Cyst"	August 28, 2020	5:00

=== Where Are They Now ===
==== Season 1 ====
No.	Title	Original release date	Length
1	"Tahj's Painful Puffy Bumps"	January 4, 2019	6:00
2	"Amber's Oozing Fistulas"	January 4, 2019	6:00
3	"John's Strange Side Boob"	January 4, 2019	6:00
4	"Carla's Cysts"	January 4, 2019	5:00
5	"Taylor's Bum Bump"	January 4, 2019	5:00
6	"Amber's Ear Keloids"	January 4, 2019	6:00

==== Season 2 ====
No.	Title	Original release date	Length
1	"Barb's Back"	February 27, 2020	9:00
2	"Chuck's Bicep"	February 27, 2020	8:00
3	"Jose's Head"	February 27, 2020	9:00
4	"Patrick's Nose"	February 27, 2020	9:00
5	"Cheri And Janice's Shoulders"	February 27, 2020	8:00
6	"Leonard's Arm"	February 27, 2020	9:00
7	"Taylore's Ears"	February 27, 2020	9:00
8	"Yami's Neck"	February 27, 2020	7:00

== Reception ==
=== Critical response ===
The first season of Dr. Pimple Popper has a Rotten Tomatoes rating of 78%. Kristen Baldwin of Entertainment Weekly gave the pilot episode a "B" rating, commenting that "Pimple Popper delivers that blast of feel-good warmth you want from a makeover show, as the patients offer tearful post-procedural testimonials about how Dr. Lee changed their life for the better."

=== Ratings ===
==== Season 1 ====
Viewership and ratings per episode of Dr. Pimple Popper
No.	Title	Air date	Rating (18–49)	Viewers (millions)	DVR (18–49)	DVR viewers (millions)	Total (18–49)	Total viewers (millions)
–	"Dr. Pimple Popper"	January 3, 2018	0.4	1.11	—N/a	—N/a	—N/a	—N/a
1	"The Lipoma Whisperer"	July 11, 2018	0.5	1.80	0.2	—N/a	0.7 (Note: Live +7 ratings were not available, so Live +3 ratings have been used instead.)	—N/a
2	"The World's Largest Lump"	July 18, 2018	0.5	1.83	0.3	0.82	0.8	2.65
3	"The Cyst Persists"	July 25, 2018	0.5	2.02	0.4	0.88	0.9	2.90
4	"The Curious Case of the Pooting Cyst"	August 1, 2018	0.6	2.37	—N/a	—N/a	—N/a	—N/a
5	"A Lipoma Jackpot"	August 8, 2018	0.6	2.10	—N/a	—N/a	—N/a	—N/a
6	"An American Tail"	August 15, 2018	0.5	2.09	0.3	0.70	0.8	2.78

==== Season 2 ====
Viewership and ratings per episode of Dr. Pimple Popper
No.	Title	Air date	Rating (18–49)	Viewers (millions)	DVR (18–49)	DVR viewers (millions)	Total (18–49)	Total viewers (millions)
–	"The 12 Pops of Christmas"	December 13, 2018	0.4	1.50	—N/a	—N/a	—N/a	—N/a
1	"Nose No Bounds"	January 3, 2019	0.6	2.49	0.3	0.87	0.9	3.36
2	"Tumor Takeover"	January 10, 2019	0.7	2.79	0.4	1.04	1.1	3.83
3	"The Last Unicorn"	January 17, 2019	0.7	2.84	0.4	1.16	1.1	4.00
4	"Sisters Lumpity Lump Lump"	January 24, 2019	0.6	2.99	0.4	1.03	1.0	4.02
5	"Every Rosacea Has Its Thorn"	January 31, 2019	0.7	3.10	0.4	1.03	1.1	4.13
6	"Popping Popeye"	February 7, 2019	0.8	3.43	—N/a	—N/a	—N/a	—N/a
7	"Scared Cyst-less"	February 14, 2019	0.7	2.85	0.3	1.01	1.0	3.86
8	"A Lipoma Is Born"	February 21, 2019	0.7	3.17	0.4	1.18	1.1	4.35
9	"Mic Drop Pop!"	February 28, 2019	0.6	2.96	0.3	0.92	0.9	3.89
10	"Runaway Bump, Never Coming Back?"	March 7, 2019	0.8	3.24	0.3	1.02	1.1	4.26

==== Season 3 ====
Viewership and ratings per episode of Dr. Pimple Popper
No.	Title	Air date	Rating (18–49)	Viewers (millions)	DVR (18–49)	DVR viewers (millions)	Total (18–49)	Total viewers (millions)
1	"Sleepless in Steatocystoma"	July 11, 2019	0.7	3.21	0.3	1.01	1.0	4.22
2	"The Incredible Shrinking Lipoma"	July 18, 2019	0.5	2.45	0.3	1.12	0.8	3.58
3	"Hips Don't Lie"	July 25, 2019	0.5	2.51	0.3	0.98	0.8	3.49
4	"Romancing The Lump"	August 1, 2019	0.5	2.35	0.3	1.00	0.8	3.35

==== Season 4 ====
Viewership and ratings per episode of Dr. Pimple Popper
No.	Title	Air date	Rating (18–49)	Viewers (millions)	DVR (18–49)	DVR viewers (millions)	Total (18–49)	Total viewers (millions)
1	"The Record Breaking Lump!"	December 26, 2019	0.5	2.29	0.3	1.02	0.8	3.31
2	"peh-DUN-kyoo-LAY-ted"	January 2, 2020	0.6	2.80	0.2	0.81	0.8	3.61
3	"Eggs Lipoma"	January 9, 2020	0.5	2.67	—N/a	—N/a	—N/a	—N/a
4	"Dr. Lee Nose Best!"	January 16, 2020	0.6	3.00	—N/a	—N/a	—N/a	—N/a
5	"Warning: Cystem Shutdown!"	January 23, 2020	0.6	3.01	—N/a	0.91	—N/a	3.92
6	"Adventures in Pimplepopping"	January 30, 2020	0.5	2.77	—N/a	—N/a	—N/a	—N/a

==== Before the Pop: Season 1 ====
Viewership and ratings per episode of Dr. Pimple Popper
No.	Title	Air date	Rating (18–49)	Viewers (millions)
1	"Video Chat, Pop, Splat!"	September 3, 2020	0.2	1.01
2	"A Growth to Remember"	September 3, 2020	0.2	1.01
3	"Mystery Blisters: Diagnosis Unknown"	September 10, 2020	0.2	1.34
4	"A Nightmare on Skin Street"	September 17, 2020	0.2	1.47
5	"Lump Overboard"	September 24, 2020	0.2	1.43
6	"The Enormous Nose Nodules"	October 1, 2020	0.2	1.22
7	"Split Decisions"	October 8, 2020	0.1	0.96
8	"Itchy, Itchy, Ya-Ya, Da-Da"	October 15, 2020	0.2	1.27
9	"Twin Peaks"	October 22, 2020	0.1	0.85
10	"100 Lumps and Counting"	October 29, 2020	0.1	0.92

==== Season 5 ====
Viewership and ratings per episode of Dr. Pimple Popper
No.	Title	Air date	Rating (18–49)	Viewers (millions)	DVR (18–49)	DVR viewers (millions)	Total (18–49)	Total viewers (millions)
–	"Season's Squeezings"	December 21, 2020	0.2	1.19	—N/a	—N/a	—N/a	—N/a
1	"Leave It to Nevus"	December 28, 2020	0.3	1.64	0.1	0.59	0.4	2.23
2	"Big Pop on Campus"	January 4, 2021	0.3	1.93	—N/a	—N/a	—N/a	—N/a
3	"Cystic River"	January 11, 2021	0.3	1.64	0.1	0.53	0.4	2.17
4	"Don't Sweat It!"	January 18, 2021	0.3	1.66	0.1	0.56	0.4	2.22
5	"Pain in the Neck"	January 25, 2021	—N/a	—N/a	—N/a	—N/a	—N/a	—N/a
6	"Cyster, Cyster"	February 1, 2021	—N/a	—N/a	—N/a	—N/a	—N/a	—N/a
7	"Split Decision"	February 8, 2021	—N/a	—N/a	—N/a	—N/a	—N/a	—N/a
8	"The Fault in Our Scars"	February 15, 2021	—N/a	—N/a	—N/a	—N/a	—N/a	—N/a
9	"Comedone Sail Away"	February 22, 2021	—N/a	—N/a	—N/a	—N/a	—N/a	—N/a
10	"A Spoonful of Cyst"	March 1, 2021	—N/a	—N/a	—N/a	—N/a	—N/a	—N/a

==== Season 6 ====
Viewership and ratings per episode of Dr. Pimple Popper
No.	Title	Air date	Rating (18–49)	Viewers (millions)	DVR (18–49)	DVR viewers (millions)	Total (18–49)	Total viewers (millions)
1	"My Giant Nose Is Killing Me"	July 14, 2021	0.3	1.78	0.1	0.47	0.4	2.25
2	"The Lipoma Psychic"	July 21, 2021	0.3	1.90	0.1	0.53	0.4	2.43
3	"Thick-Skinned"	July 28, 2021	0.2	1.40	—N/a	—N/a	—N/a	—N/a
4	"Numbing Nevus"	August 4, 2021	0.2	1.36	—N/a	—N/a	—N/a	—N/a
5	"Driving Miss Lumpy"	August 11, 2021	0.2	1.77	0.1	0.51	0.3	2.28
6	"The Exorcyst"	August 18, 2021	0.2	1.64	0.1	0.53	0.4	2.17
7	"Shoulder Boulder"	August 25, 2021	0.2	1.77	—N/a	—N/a	—N/a	—N/a
8	"Brain Pimple"	September 1, 2021	0.2	1.72	—N/a	—N/a	—N/a	—N/a
9	"Alligator Skin"	September 8, 2021	0.2	1.65	—N/a	—N/a	—N/a	—N/a
10	"My Third Eye"	September 15, 2021	0.2	1.62	—N/a	—N/a	—N/a	—N/a

==== Season 7 ====
Viewership and ratings per episode of Dr. Pimple Popper
No.	Title	Air date	Rating (18–49)	Viewers (millions)
–	"A Pimple Carol"	December 8, 2021	0.2	1.03
