= Nevus lipomatosus superficialis =

- Other names: Nevus lipomatosis of Hoffman and Zurhelle
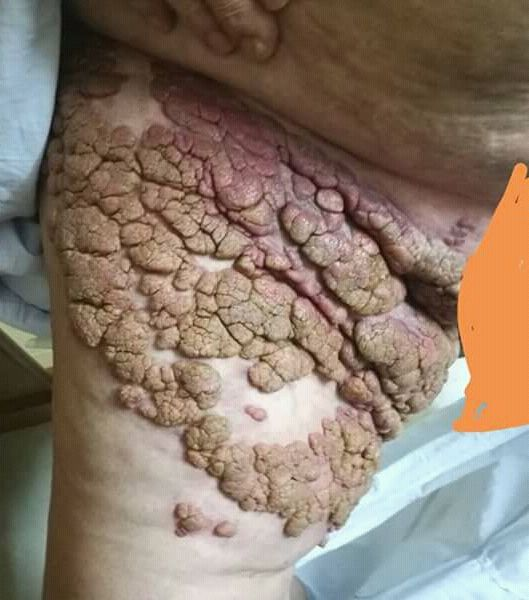
- Specialty: Dermatology

Nevus lipomatosus superficialis (NLS or NLCS, also known as nevus lipomatosis of Hoffman and Zurhelle) is characterized by soft, yellowish papules or cerebriform plaques, usually of the buttock or thigh, less often of the ear or scalp, with a wrinkled rather than warty surface. It is usually congenital in origin or appears within the first three decades.

A pedunculated lipofibroma is a solitary variant of nevus lipomatosus superficialis. It usually appears in adult life, and usually on the axilla, knee, ear, arm, scalp and the lower trunk.

In both multiple and solitary variants, the histopathology shows variable amounts of mature lipocytes within the dermis. Occasionally, there is an excessive fibrocollagenous tissue proliferation. The main differential diagnoses are acrochordon, seborrheic keratosis, intradermal melanocytic nevi, neurofibromas, verrucae and fibroepithelioma of Pinkus.

== Signs and symptoms ==
Clinically, there are two variations. The most prevalent variety, known as the classical type, is characterized by a number of flesh-colored or yellowish sessile lesions that have a propensity to combine into smooth or cerebriform plaques that are distributed linearly, zosteriformly, or segmentally. Lessons tend to focus on the lower trunk, particularly the gluteal, sacrum, and lumbar regions as well as the pelvic girdle.

The second clinical pattern of NLCS is a solitary papule or nodule that typically appears later in life. It mimics a skin tag in appearance and is flesh-colored and domed. The solitary form, which has been reported on the arms, knees, ears, axillae, nose, calves, clitoris, and scalp, has no known specific distribution.

The lesions are asymptomatic in both forms. In rare cases, ulceration happens, particularly following ischemia or external damage. Moreover, coexisting comedo-like changes, leukodermic patches, café-au-lait macules, and overlaying hypertrichosis are possible.

== Causes ==
Although the pathophysiology of NLCS is unknown, ectopic adipocytes may arise from pericytes, similar to embryonic lipogenesis, or from precursor cells from the dermal arteries.

== Diagnosis ==
The histology of NLCS typically demonstrates the proliferation of ectopic mature adipocytes in the reticular dermis, which ranges from 10 to 50% of the lesion. Adipocytes can exist alone or in small groups between collagen bundles, but they most frequently originate surrounding blood arteries or eccrine glands. In certain instances, there is a perivascular infiltration of spindle-shaped and mononuclear cells, as well as an increased density of collagen fibers and fibroblasts. Acanthosis, basket weave hyperkeratosis, elevated basal pigmentation, and obliteration with focal rete ridge extension are observed in the epidermis. Adnexal structures may exhibit perifollicular fibrosis and be unaffected or diminished in certain instances.

Clinically, NLCS needs to be distinguished from focal dermal hypoplasia (Goltz syndrome), neurofibroma, lymphangioma, hemangioma, sebaceous nevus, and connective tissue nevus.

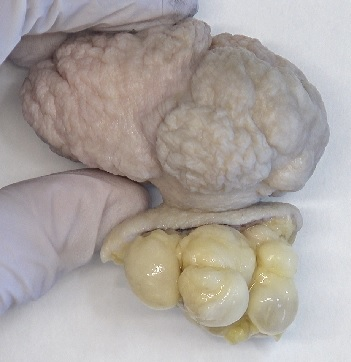
Pedunculated lipofibroma, gross pathology

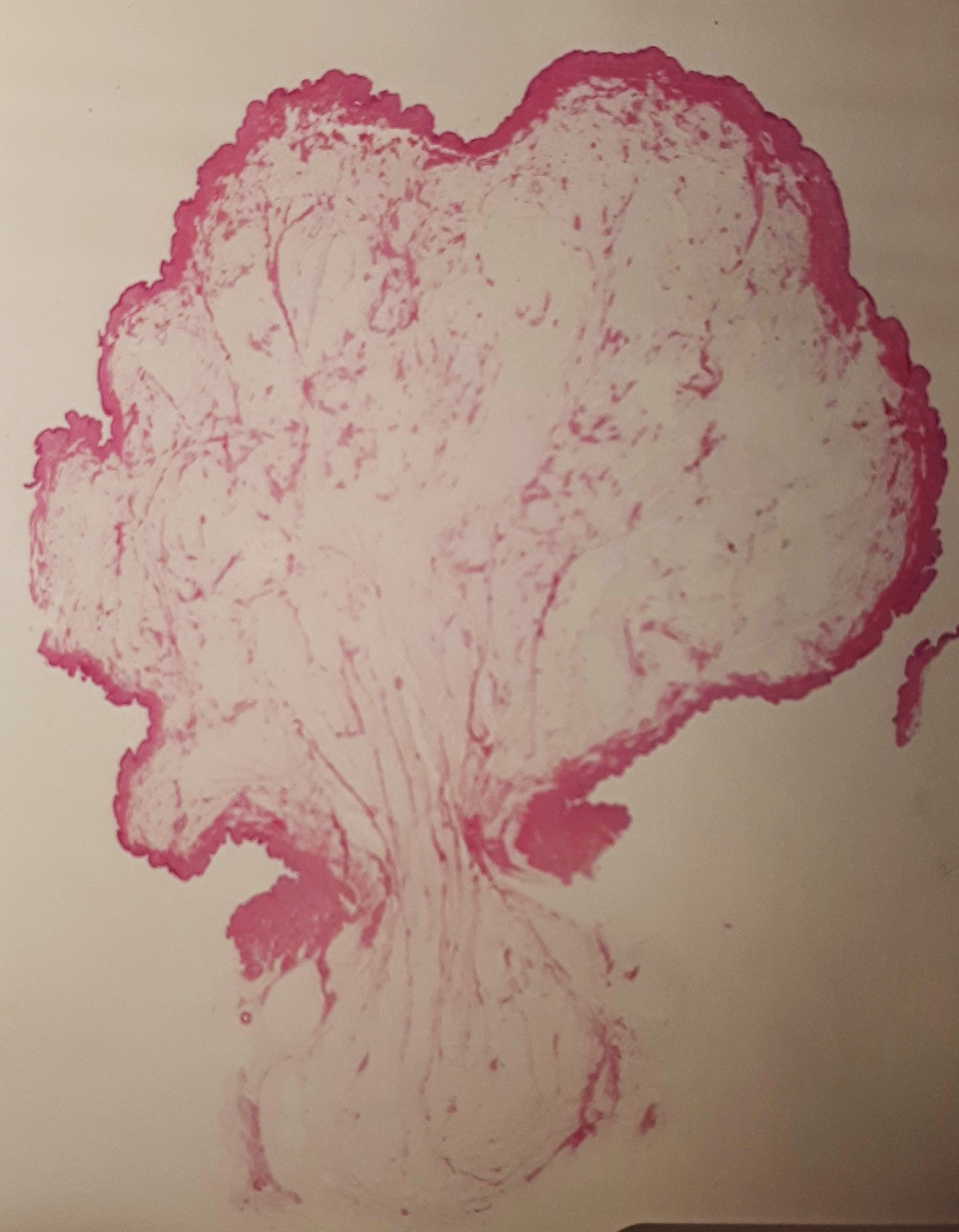
Micrograph of pedunculated lipofibroma, low magnification, with dermal expansion of fatty tissue.

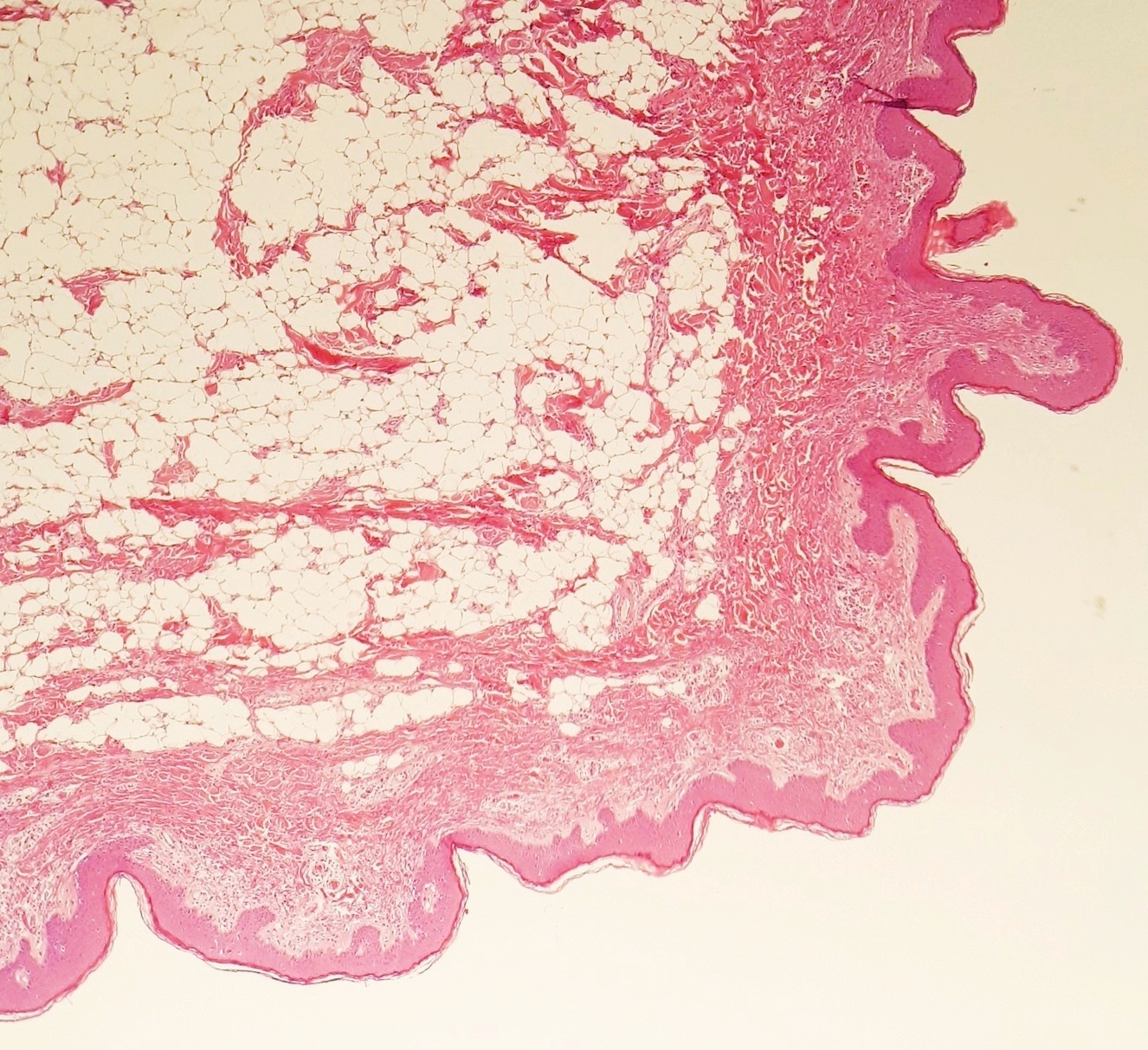
Intermediate magnification, showing mature lipocytes with absence of capsule.

== Treatment ==
Given the rarity of malignant degeneration and systemic problems, treatment is only recommended for cosmetic reasons. The best course of treatment is surgical excision because recurrence lesions are uncommon.

== See also ==
- Skin lesion
- List of cutaneous conditions
