= Punk (TV series) =

- Genre: Documentary
- Directed by: Jesse James Miller
- Country of origin: United States
- Original language: English
- No. of episodes: 4

Production
- Executive producers: John Varvatos; Iggy Pop; Derik Murray
- Production companies: Network Entertainment; MGM Television

Original release
- Network: Epix
- Release: March 11 – April 1, 2019

Punk is an American four part documentary television series that ran from March 11 to April 1, 2019. on Epix.

== Premise ==
Punk explores "the music, the fashion, the art and the DIY attitude of a subculture of self-described misfits and outcasts.". Each episode focuses on an individual era of punk, beginning with protopunk in the 1960s up until the present day.

== Production ==
On December 10, 2018, it was announced that Epix had given the production a series order consisting of four episodes set to premiere on March 11, 2019. The series was expected to be directed by Jesse James Miller and executive produced by John Varvatos, Iggy Pop, and Derik Murray. Production companies involved with the series were slated to consist of Network Entertainment. Those interviewed in the series include Iggy Pop, Johnny Rotten, Marky Ramone, Henry Rollins, Debbie Harry, Chris Stein, Duff McKagan, Wayne Kramer, Jello Biafra, Flea, Dave Grohl, Danny Fields, Legs McNeil, and Penelope Spheeris, among others.

== Episodes ==
No.	Title	Directed by	Written by	Original release date
1	"Part 1"	Jesse James Miller	Unknown	March 11, 2019
2	"Part 2"	Jesse James Miller	Unknown	March 18, 2019
3	"Part 3"	Jesse James Miller	Unknown	March 25, 2019
4	"Part 4"	Jesse James Miller	Unknown	April 1, 2019
