= Fairdale, West Virginia =

Unincorporated community in West Virginia, United States

- Unincorporated community
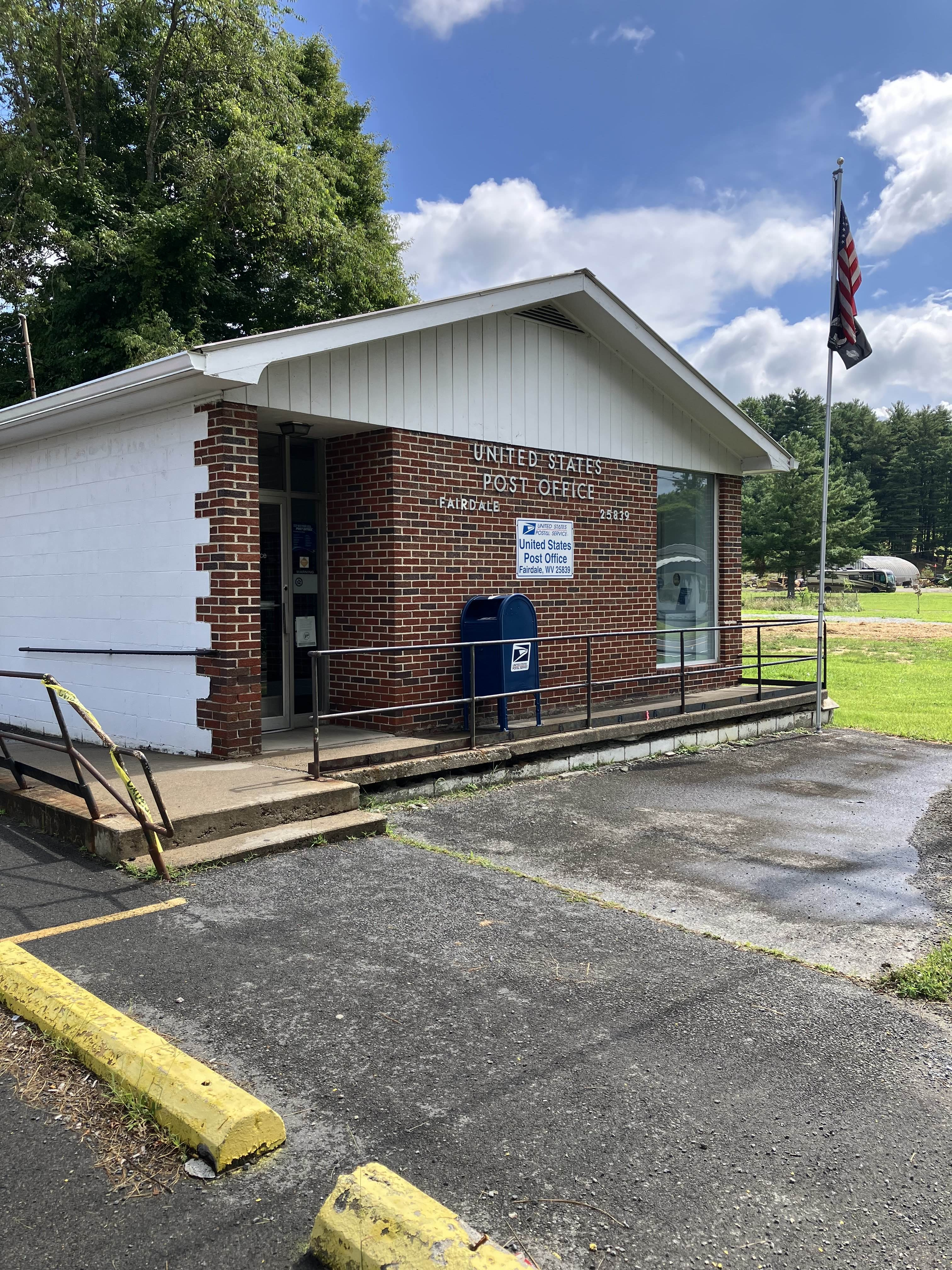
- Post office in Fairdale, West Virginia

- Location within West Virginia Location within the United States
- Coordinates: 37°46′53″N 81°21′47″W
- Country: United States
- State: West Virginia
- County: Raleigh
- Elevation: 1,900 ft (580 m)
- Time zone: UTC-5 (Eastern (EST))
  - Summer (DST): UTC-4 (EDT)
- ZIP code: 25839
- Area codes: 304 & 681
- GNIS feature ID: 1558362

Fairdale is an unincorporated community in Raleigh County, West Virginia, United States. Fairdale is located on West Virginia Route 99 15.3 miles (24.6 km) west of Beckley. Fairdale has a post office with ZIP code 25839.
