= Lobstermen =

Lobstermen, Lobster Man, or, variation, may refer to:

- Lobsterman, a fisherman who specializes in lobster

== Television ==
- Deadliest Catch: Lobstermen, a 2007 reality TV documentary about lobster fishing
  - Lobstermen: Jeopardy at Sea, the pilot miniseries for Deadliest Catch: Lobstermen
- Aussie Lobster Men, a 2019 reality TV documentary series about lobster fishing
- "The Lobster Man" (TV episode), a 1968 episode of the TV series Voyage to the Bottom of the Sea

== Other uses ==
- Quintana Roo Lobstermen (Spanish: Langosteros), a baseball team that played at Estadio de Béisbol Beto Ávila, Cancun, Mexico
- The Lobster Man, a 1915 waterscape painting by Frank Weston Benson
- Lobster Man, two Royal Dalton figures designed by M. Nicoll
- Lobster Men, a fictional alien species
- Jeff Costa (born 1962; ring name: "The Lobsterman"), U.S. professional wrestler

== See also ==
- Lobster fishing
- Lobster (disambiguation)
