= Electric Pictures =

Television production company in Australia

- Type: Private company
- Industry: Television
- Genre: Television production
- Founders: Andrew Ogilvie
- Headquarters: Perth, Australia
- Area served: Worldwide
- Divisions: EP Independent
- Website: electricpictures.com.au

Electric Pictures is an Australian-based television production company which develops and produces factual television programs for various international networks. The company is based in Perth, Western Australia and was founded by Andrew Ogilvie who also acts as CEO. A subsidiary company, EP Independent, distributes Electric Pictures programming.

Among the notable series produced by Electric Pictures include Drain the Oceans for National Geographic, Aussie Gold Hunters for Discovery Channel, and The War That Changed Us for the ABC.
