= Moose Creek =

Moose Creek can refer to:

Canada

- Moose Creek, Ontario, a small village in the municipality of North Stormont near the cities of Cornwall and Ottawa
- Rural Municipality of Moose Creek No. 33, Saskatchewan
- Moose Creek (Yukon), a creek

United States

- Moose Creek, Alaska
- Moose Creek (Bearpaw River), a tributary of Bearpaw River in Alaska
- Moose Creek Township, Minnesota
- Moose Creek (Adirondack mountains), in the High Peaks Wilderness Area of New York State
