= Outback Opal Hunters =

Australian factual television series

- Outback Opal Hunters title card
- Genre: Factual
- Narrated by: Luke Hewitt
- Opening theme: "Money" by Ash Grunwald
- Country of origin: Australia
- Original language: English
- No. of series: 8
- No. of episodes: 81

Production
- Executive producers: Darren Chau; Rob Holloway
- Producer: Prospero Productions
- Cinematography: Miles Brotherson; Riaan Laubscher; Mark Hooper; Ben Canon; Mike Hoath; Ian Withnall
- Running time: 60 minutes

Original release
- Network: Discovery Channel
- Release: 8 February 2018 – 12 May 2022

Related
- Aussie Gold Hunters

Outback Opal Hunters is an Australian factual television show which follows opal miners across various sites in the Australian states of New South Wales, Queensland, South Australia and Western Australia. It is produced by Prospero Productions and began on the Discovery Channel on 8 February 2018. The series has been a ratings success, and has been broadcast in over 100 countries, including the United Kingdom and United States.

== Premise ==
The series follows opal miners in various locations of Australia as they strive to reach their individually set season target (measured in Australian dollars).

== Production ==
In August 2017 it was announced Discovery had commissioned Outback Opal Hunters, a factual series from Prospero Productions which follows opal miners across New South Wales (NSW), Queensland (QLD) and Coober Pedy, South Australia (SA). The eight episode first season premiered on 8 February 2018. In September 2018 it was announced the series had been renewed for a 13 episode second season which would expand into Western Australia (WA). The second season which was filmed in Lightning Ridge (NSW), Opalton (QLD), Coober Pedy (SA) and Laverton (WA) premiered on 31 January 2019. The third season consisting of eight episodes was filmed across Lightning Ridge (NSW), Opalton (QLD), Laverton (WA), White Cliffs (NSW), Sheepyard (NSW) and Mintabie (SA). The season premiered on 17 October 2019. Season four which consisted of 12 episodes premiered on 6 February 2020. The fifth season premiered on 8 October 2020. In December 2020 it was initially reported as part of Foxtel's 2021 Upfronts the series would return for its sixth season on 11 February 2021. However, the season in fact premiered a week earlier on 4 February 2021. The seventh season premiered on 7 October 2021. The 12 episode eighth season premiered on 24 February 2022.

== Cast ==
Name	Nickname	Location	Seasons							
Name	Nickname	Location	1	2	3	4	5	6	7	8
Justin Lang	The Rookies	Coober Pedy, SA	Main							
Daniel Becker	The Rookies	Coober Pedy, SA	Main							
Kelly Tishler	The Opal Queen	Lightning Ridge, NSW	Main					Guest		
Mark Tishler	The Opal Queen	Lightning Ridge, NSW		Main						
Dwayne Hanrahan	The Opal Queen	Lightning Ridge, NSW		Main						
Aaron Grotjahn	Various (Note: For seasons one and two, Col Duff, Aaron Grotjahn and Greg Geran were featured as a team called Col's Crew. After Duff departed the team, the crew was referred to as the Boulder Boys.)	Opalton, QLD	Main							
Ron Selig	Various	Opalton, QLD				Main				
Col Duff	Various (Note: Col Duff initially starred in the first two seasons of the series as part of Col's Crew. He then appeared independently for seasons three and four, was absent from season five, and then returned in season six as part of The Geran Gang.)	Opalton, QLD	Main					Main		
Greg Geran	Various (Note: Greg Geran initially starred in the first two seasons of the series as part of Col's Crew. In season six Geran returned to the series in a team called The Geran Gang.)	Opalton, QLD	Main					Main		
Stoney Cain	The Geran Gang	Opalton, QLD						Main		
Margie Geran	The Geran Gang	Opalton, QLD						Main		
Peter Cooke	Various (Note: For seasons one and two the team was nicknamed The Cooke Brothers. Following the departure of Mick Cooke in season two, the team was later nicknamed The Bros for seasons three and four before dropping the nickname in season five.)	Lightning Ridge, NSW	Main							
Mick Cooke	Various	Lightning Ridge, NSW	Main							
Sam Westra	Various	Lightning Ridge, NSW		Main						
Adam Piromanski, Cassidy Ricketts, Peter Piromanski, and Vikki Piromanski	The Fire Crew	Western Australia		Main						
Rod Manning and Les Walsh	The Bushmen	Sheepyard, NSW			Main					
Carl Grice and Mary McMillan	The Brits	White Cliffs, NSW			Main					
Jaymin Sullivan, Noah McDonough and James ‘JC’ Caruana	The Young Guns	White Cliffs, NSW			Main					
Rodney Pearse	The Tunnel Rats	Mintabie, SA (seasons 3-4) Grawin, NSW (season 6)			Main					
Bayden Pearse	The Tunnel Rats	Mintabie, SA (seasons 3-4) Grawin, NSW (season 6)			Main			Main		
Elisa Grobe	The Tunnel Rats	Mintabie, SA (seasons 3-4) Grawin, NSW (season 6)			Main			Main		
Gavan McFarlan, Connie McFarlan and Teagan McFarlan	—N/a	Lightning Ridge, NSW				Main				
Chris Cheal	The Cheals	Lightning Ridge, NSW				Main				
Oscar Cheal	The Cheals	Lightning Ridge, NSW				Main				
Farren Lamb	The Cheals	Lightning Ridge, NSW				Main			Main	
Rory Cheal	The Cheals	Lightning Ridge, NSW					Main			
Paul Coon	The Blacklighters	Coober Pedy, SA					Main			
Mark I’Anson	The Blacklighters	Coober Pedy, SA					Main			
John Nassar	The Blacklighters	Coober Pedy, SA					Main			
Xavier Montgomery	The Blacklighters	Coober Pedy, SA							Main	
Greg Scully, Scott Stevens	The Bishop	Coober Pedy, SA						Main		
Isaac Andreou	Opal Whisperers	Yowah, QLD						Main		
Sofia Andreou	Opal Whisperers	Yowah, QLD						Main		
Chris Daff	Opal Whisperers	Yowah, QLD						Main		
Micky Taranto, Joe Taranto, Jack Taranto, Viviane Taranto, and Natasha Owen	The Tarantos	Opalton, QLD							Main	
Joe Kalmar, Angel Dempsey, and Juan Vasco	The Misfits	Andamooka, SA							Main	
Leif Tanzer, Colin 'Cozza' Kathagen and Matthew 'Matt' Kathagen	The Mooka Boys	Andamooka, SA								Main

== Episodes ==
=== Series overview ===
Series overview
Season	Episodes	Originally released	
Season	Episodes	First released	Last released
1	8	8 February 2018	29 March 2018
2	13	21 January 2019	25 April 2019
3	8	17 October 2019	5 December 2019
4	12	6 February 2020	23 April 2020
5	8	8 October 2020	26 November 2020
6	12	4 February 2021	22 April 2021
7	8	7 October 2021	25 November 2021
8	12	24 February 2022	12 May 2022

=== Season 1 (2018) ===
Outback Opal Hunters season one episodes
No. overall	No. in season	Title	Original release date	Australia viewers
1	1	"Opal Fever"	8 February 2018	71,000
2	2	"The Sky is Falling"	15 February 2018	73,000
3	3	"The Legend Returns"	22 February 2018	69,000
4	4	"Attack of the Cacti"	1 March 2018	75,000
5	5	"Brother vs. Brother"	8 March 2018	71,000
6	6	"Rookies are the Bomb"	15 March 2018	53,000
7	7	"Cave-Ins and Explosions"	22 March 2018	41,000
8	8	"Aerial Opal Shopping"	29 March 2018	43,000

=== Season 2 (2019) ===
Outback Opal Hunters season two episodes
No. overall	No. in season	Title	Original release date	Australia viewers
9	1	"Rookie Mistakes"	31 January 2019	37,000
10	2	"Wild Wild West"	7 February 2019	38,000
11	3	"Going Under"	14 February 2019	41,000
12	4	"Risky Business"	21 February 2019	60,000
13	5	"Hot Hot Hot"	28 February 2019	52,000
14	6	"Machine Mayhem"	7 March 2019	54,000
15	7	"Against All Odds"	14 March 2019	N/A
16	8	"Blue Fire Opal or Bust"	21 March 2019	47,000
17	9	"Race Against Time"	28 March 2019	35,000
18	10	"Desperate Times, Desperate Measures"	4 April 2019	45,000
19	11	"Battling Back"	11 April 2019	44,000
20	12	"Make or Break"	18 April 2019	38,000
21	13	"Last Chance"	25 April 2019	50,000

=== Season 3 (2019) ===
Outback Opal Hunters season three episodes
No. overall	No. in season	Title	Original release date	Australia viewers
22	1	"To Catch a Thief"	17 October 2019	63,000
23	2	"First Time Underground"	24 October 2019	67,000
24	3	"Pineapple Danger"	31 October 2019	60,000
25	4	"Stranded Without Air"	7 November 2019	62,000
26	5	"Protect the Claim"	14 November 2019	62,000
27	6	"One Tonne Digger Down a 20 Meter Shaft"	21 November 2019	59,000
28	7	"Rockfalls and Water"	28 November 2019	68,000
29	8	"Bad Luck & Fallouts"	5 December 2019	59,000

=== Season 4 (2020) ===
Outback Opal Hunters season four episodes
No. overall	No. in season	Title	Original release date	Australia viewers
30	1	"Dead Animal"	6 February 2020	45,000
31	2	"Digging the Wrong Claim"	13 February 2020	56,000
32	3	"Bomb & Deadly Gas"	20 February 2020	66,000
33	4	"Race the Storm"	27 February 2020	71,000
34	5	"Dangerous Mining"	5 March 2020	55,000
35	6	"Dust Storm to Disaster Underground"	12 March 2020	52,000
36	7	"Storms & Floods"	19 March 2020	49,000
37	8	"Lifeline & Hunt Far Away"	26 March 2020	60,000
38	9	"Injury to Break Through"	2 April 2020	62,000
39	10	"Thieves on Land & In the Skies"	9 April 2020	75,000
40	11	"Up Late & Last Push"	16 April 2020	99,000
41	12	"Race to Hospital"	23 April 2020	95,000

=== Season 5 (2020) ===
Outback Opal Hunters season five episodes
No. overall	No. in season	Title	Original release date	Australia viewers
42	1	"Episode 1"	8 October 2020	58,000
43	2	"Episode 2"	15 October 2020	54,000
44	3	"Episode 3"	22 October 2020	58,000
45	4	"Episode 4"	29 October 2020	55,000
46	5	"Episode 5"	5 November 2020	50,000
47	6	"Episode 6"	12 November 2020	71,000
48	7	"Episode 7"	19 November 2020	73,000
49	8	"Episode 8"	26 November 2020	69,000

=== Season 6 (2021) ===
Outback Opal Hunters season six episodes
No. overall	No. in season	Title	Original release date	Australia viewers
50	1	"Episode 1"	4 February 2021	75,000
51	2	"Episode 2"	11 February 2021	56,000
52	3	"Episode 3"	18 February 2021	73,000
53	4	"Episode 4"	25 February 2021	60,000
54	5	"Episode 5"	4 March 2021	65,000
55	6	"Episode 6"	11 March 2021	59,000
56	7	"Episode 7"	18 March 2021	69,000
57	8	"Episode 8"	25 March 2021	59,000
58	9	"Episode 9"	1 April 2021	62,000
59	10	"Episode 10"	8 April 2021	55,000
60	11	"Episode 11"	15 April 2021	55,000
61	12	"Episode 12"	22 April 2021	71,000

=== Season 7 (2021) ===
Outback Opal Hunters season seven episodes
No. overall	No. in season	Title	Original release date	Australia viewers
62	1	"Disaster Strikes"	7 October 2021	60,000
63	2	"The Opal Whisperers"	14 October 2021	69,000
64	3	"Glory Days"	21 October 2021	54,000
65	4	"Young Gun Returns"	28 October 2021	62,000
66	5	"Trouble Underground"	4 November 2021	53,000
67	6	"The Value of Misfits"	11 November 2021	55,000
68	7	"Scrap Noodler"	18 November 2021	50,000
69	8	"Walls Closing In"	25 November 2021	45,000

=== Season 8 (2022) ===
Outback Opal Hunters season eight episodes
No. overall	No. in season	Title	Original release date	Australia viewers
70	1	"Rookie Mistake"	24 February 2022	46,000
71	2	"Impenetrable No More"	3 March 2022	27,000
72	3	"Follow the Clues"	10 March 2022	N/A
73	4	"Cathedral Secrets"	17 March 2022	31,000
74	5	"A Mine That Stings"	24 March 2022	38,000
75	6	"Sparks Fly"	31 March 2022	44,000
76	7	"Free Falling"	7 April 2022	39,000
77	8	"Treachery"	14 April 2022	44,000
78	9	"Dangers of the Abandoned"	21 April 2022	43,000
79	10	"Smashed"	28 April 2022	38,000
80	11	"Digging with a Dinosaur"	5 May 2022	36,000
81	12	"No Risk, No Reward"	12 May 2022	60,000

== Broadcast ==
As of May 2020 the series has been broadcast in over 100 countries, including in the United Kingdom on Quest, and in the United States on Discovery Channel.

== Reception ==
=== Ratings ===
The series has been a domestic and international ratings success. Executive producer Darren Chau, speaking with Mediaweek in May 2020 said, "Aussie Gold Hunters has been the #1 factual series on Foxtel for the last three successive years. Outback Opal Hunters is right behind it." He said that in the United Kingdom, "Outback Opal Hunters is top five on Quest", and in the United States it airs on the Discovery Channel where it premiered in November 2019 "so successful they immediately rolled into season two" and it airs "on the channel's biggest night of the week".

=== Accolades ===
The series was nominated for Best Documentary Series at the Screen Producers Australia Awards in 2018.

== See also ==
Australian resource extraction television

- Aussie Gold Hunters
- Aussie Lobster Men

Gemstone mining television

- Jade Fever, jade extraction in Canada
