= Jade Fever =

Television series

- Genre: Documentary, reality
- Created by: David Gullason; Jeffrey Kinnon
- Country of origin: Canada
- Original language: English
- No. of seasons: 7

Production
- Executive producers: David Gullason; Brian Hamilton; Gabriela Schonbach; Michael Chechik
- Production locations: Jade City and the Turnagain River basin of British Columbia
- Running time: 30 minutes

Original release
- Network: Discovery Channel Canada
- Release: March 31, 2015 – July 19, 2021

Jade Fever is a Canadian documentary television series from Discovery Channel Canada, produced by Omnifilm Entertainment, that ran for seven seasons between April 2015 and July 2021. The series follows a long-standing jade mining family as they explored and placer-mined nephrite jade in the Dease Lake area of Northern British Columbia while also running a small motel and souvenir business in Jade City. The series was narrated by Martin Strong.

Jade Fever was nominated for a 2016 Canadian Screen Award in the "Best Factual Program or Series" category. The series premiered on The Weather Channel in the US on June 5, 2021. It was also available in Germany, France, Sweden, Australia, and Russia, among other territories. In April 2021, Jade Fever became available to stream on CTV.ca.

The series was cancelled in July 2021. Prior to its cancellation, Tahltan First Nation claimed the series was filmed in a mine in Tahltan territory without approval from the nation. However, permits from the Ministry of Energy and Mines had been obtained. In July 2021, Bell Media did not respond to questions of whether the series was pulled off-air owing to pressure from the Tahltan First Nation.

== Summary ==
Jade City is a remote highway stop in northern British Columbia with a community of 25 run by Claudia Bunce and her husband Robin. They mine a large jade claim and employ most of the people in town, making the town dependent on the financial success of the mine.

== Cast ==
Claudia Bunce
The matriarch of the Bunce jade mining family and the mine boss bookkeeper (season 1–7).
Robin Bunce
The patriarch of the Bunce jade mining family and heavy truck/construction equipment operator (season 1–7).
Josh Bunce
Claudia and Robin's youngest son, a mine hand, heavy truck/construction equipment operator (season 1–7), and camp medic (season 3).
Justin Bunce
Claudia and Robin's middle son, a mine hand, prospector, heavy truck/construction equipment operator (season 2; season 7), and jade tabletop maker (season 3).
Shaun Bunce
Claudia and Robin’s eldest son (season 2, episode 13).
Steve Simonovic
Claudia Bunce's father, a pioneer Cassiar Country jade miner, and founder of Jade City (season 1–2 and season 5–7)
Guy Martial
Mine hand, heavy truck/construction equipment operator (season 1–5)
Robin, a.k.a. "R-2"
Mine hand, heavy truck/construction equipment operator (season 1–7), and alternate camp medic (season 3).
Alan Qiao
First Chinese investor (season 1–2).
Gary Wentworth
Mine hand, heavy truck/construction equipment operator, and friend of Guy (season 3–7).
"Scrappy" Larry
Local scrap metal/used heavy truck/used construction equipment dealer, heavy truck/construction equipment mechanic, heavy truck/construction equipment operator, and Bunce family friend (season 2–3; season 5–7).
Susan
Scrappy Larry's common-law wife (season 5, episode 3–6).
Alex
Bunce company employee residing in Jade City (season 2; season 3).
Joe, a.k.a. "Jo-Jo"
Bunce company employee residing in Jade City (season 2–3; season 5).
Karim Kaouar
Professional pastry chef, Two Mile mine camp cook (season 5–6).
Peter Niu
NEK Mining Inc. company executive (season 3).
William
Beijing-based representative of NEK Mining (season 3).
Christina
Vancouver-based representative of NEK Mining (season 3).
Chris
Geologist, mine hand, and Justin's friend (season 3).
Henry
Jade miner on a neighbouring claim and Bunce family friend (season 3).
Mike Mee
Engineer, mine hand, venture capital fundraiser, and Justin's friend (season 2–3).
Lesley Hunt
Consultant Geologist (Season 1).

== List of episodes ==
=== Season 1 ===
No.	Title	Original release date
1	"Jade Fever"	March 31, 2015
2	"Got a Rope"	March 31, 2015
3	"The Long March"	April 7, 2015
4	"Slippery Slope"	April 7, 2015
5	"Hide and Seek"	April 14, 2015
6	"No Jade Until Blood is Spilled"	April 14, 2015
7	"The Curse of the Jade"	April 21, 2015
8	"Rude Awakening"	April 21, 2015
9	"Company's Coming"	April 28, 2015
10	"Out of Bounds"	April 28, 2015
11	"Down to the Wire"	May 5, 2015
12	"It Ain't Easy Finding Green"	May 5, 2015

=== Season 2 ===
No.	Title	Original release date
1	"Mountains To Climb"	February 23, 2016
2	"Out in the Cold"	February 23, 2016
3	"500 Bolts"	March 1, 2016
4	"Loaded"	March 1, 2016
5	"An Ounce of Hope"	March 8, 2016
6	"May Jay!"	March 8, 2016
7	"Walk Hard"	March 15, 2016
8	"Big Chunk of Green"	March 15, 2016
9	"Sink, Sank, Sunk"	March 22, 2016
10	"Fractured"	March 22, 2016
11	"The Jade Whisperer"	March 29, 2016
12	"Mystery Rock"	March 29, 2016
13	"Code Brown"	April 5, 2016
14	"The Big One"	April 5, 2016
15	"Jaded"	April 12, 2016
16	"Escape From Wolverine"	April 12, 2016

=== Season 3 ===
No.	Title	Original release date
1	"Hard Climb"	March 7, 2017
2	"Breakdown and Meltdowns"	March 7, 2017
3	"Digging In"	March 15, 2017
4	"Cutting Crew"	March 15, 2017
5	"High Stakes Claim"	March 21, 2017
6	"Eyes on the Prize"	March 21, 2017
7	"Shut Out"	March 28, 2017
8	"Start It Up"	March 28, 2017
9	"Slabs of Jade"	April 4, 2017
10	"Night Moves"	April 4, 2017
11	"The Big Fin"	April 11, 2017
12	"The Bunce Dynasty"	April 11, 2017

=== Season 4 ===
No.	Title	Original release date
1	"Head Start"	March 13, 2018
2	"Hard Core"	March 13, 2018
3	"Tip of the Iceberg"	March 20, 2018
4	"You're My Boy Blue"	March 20, 2018
5	"Uphill Battle"	March 27, 2018
6	"All Slice, No Dice"	March 27, 2018
7	"Slipping Away"	April 3, 2018
8	"Failing Grade"	April 3, 2018
9	"Moving Day"	April 10, 2018
10	"Battered and Bruised"	April 10, 2018
11	"The Curse of Wolverine"	April 17, 2018
12	"Shower Day"	April 17, 2018
13	"Medio-core"	April 24, 2018
14	"We Found Jade"	April 24, 2018

=== Season 5 ===
No.	Title	Original release date
1	"The Long and Grinding Road"	April 8, 2019
2	"Nose for Jade"	April 8, 2019
3	"Bunkhouse Blues"	April 15, 2019
4	"Stuck In The Middle	April 15, 2019
5	It's My Party	April 22, 2019
6	"Who's The Boss?"	April 22, 2019
7	"Running On Empty"	April 29, 2019
8	"Ridge to Riches"	April 29, 2019
9	"Playing With Fire"	May 6, 2019
10	"Bunkhouse or Bust"	May 6, 2019
11	"Risky Business"	May 13, 2019
12	"No Country For Cold Men"	May 13, 2019
13	"Snow Job"	May 20, 2019
14	"Pushing the Limits"	May 20, 2019

=== Season 6 ===
No.	Title	Original release date
1	"The Big Deal"	March 23, 2020
2	"The Last Laugh"	March 23, 2020
3	"Down to the Wire"	March 30, 2020
4	"Trans Mission"	March 30, 2020
5	"Bad Brakes"	April 6, 2020
6	"Right Under Our Nose"	April 6, 2020
7	"Deal Breaker"	April 13, 2020
8	"Deal or No Deal"	April 13, 2020
9	"Heavy Lifting"	April 20, 2020
10	"Panic Mode"	April 20, 2020
11	"Digging In"	April 27, 2020
12	"Christmas In August"	April 27, 2020
13	"Between A Truck and a ..	May 4, 2020
14	"Mutiny On the Mountain"	May 4, 2020

=== Season 7 ===
No.	Title	Original release date
1	"Keep On Truckin'"	May 10, 2021
2	"Young Guy With Semi"	May 17, 2021
3	"One Step Forward"	May 24, 2021
4	"Of Mud and Men"	May 31, 2021
5	"Six Pack O' Trouble"	June 7, 2021
6	"Fly By Wire"	June 14, 2021
7	"The Little Saw That Couldn't"	June 21, 2021
8	"Go Deep"	June 28, 2021
9	"Fathers And Sons"	July 5, 2021
10	"All That Glitters is Jade"	July 19, 2021

== Impact on industry ==
In season 3, the Bunce's hard rock mining operation at the Dynasty claim started to successfully quarry jade – a first in jade mining; which usually rips jade lenses out of rock with heavy equipment instead of quarrying it out like marble.

== Controversy ==
In 2020 Tahltan First Nation requested the show's mining crew cease operations of their mine as they had not consulted with or sought approvals from Tahltan First Nation to mine within their territory. Tahltan reached out to Bell Media and Omnifilm who develop the program to cease filming. In May 2021, Bell Media claimed they were unaware of the requests from Tahltan First Nation, but claimed they would investigate into the matter. In May 2021, after a request from the Tahltan Central Government, the Province of British Columbia put an order to not issue jade mining permits in the region for 2 years.

== See also ==
Gemstone mining TV shows

- Ice Cold Gold, a cancelled reality TV series featuring gemstone prospecting in Greenland
- Gold Rush (season 4, in Guyana, with placer diamond mining)
- Outback Opal Hunters, a reality TV series featuring opal mining in Australia

Resource extraction TV shows in Canada

- Yukon Gold, a cancelled reality TV series featuring placer gold mining in northern British Columbia (seasons 1 & 4) and Yukon
