= Drain the Oceans =

Australian-British documentary television series

- Genre: Documentary; History; Mystery
- Created by: Sophie Elwin-Harris
- Directed by: Sophie Elwin-Harris; Marc Tiley; Alex West; Tomasz Cebula; Wayne Derrick; Chris Thorburn; Malcolm Clark; Sam Taplin; Vicky Matthews; Christopher Riley
- Narrated by: Craig Sechler; Russell Boulter
- Composers: Ash Gibson Greig; George Gattapan; Peter Mundinger
- Countries of origin: United Kingdom; Australia
- Original language: English
- No. of seasons: 6
- No. of episodes: 63

Production
- Executive producers: Crispin Sadler; Phil Craig; Simon Raikes; Helen Hawken; Tom Adams; Carolyn Payne; Andrew Ogilvie; Andrea Quesnelle; Mark Fielder
- Running time: 47 minutes
- Production companies: Mallinson Sadler Productions; Electric Pictures

Original release
- Network: National Geographic
- Release: 28 May 2018 – 9 April 2023

Related
- Drain the Great Lakes; Drain the Titanic; Drain the Bermuda Triangle; Drain the Sunken Pirate City

Drain the Oceans is an Australian and British documentary television series that premiered on 28 May 2018 on National Geographic. The 25-part factual series is hosted by Russell Boulter, and explores shipwrecks, treasure and sunken cities using underwater scanning system, scientific data, and art digital recreations. Andrew Ogilvie from Electric Pictures and Crispin Sadler from Mallinson Sadler Productions produced the series for National Geographic. Drain The Oceans was preceded by similar National Geographic productions: Drain the Great Lakes, Drain the Titanic, Drain the Bermuda Triangle and Drain the Sunken Pirate City.The series is available in the form of a 10-part season and a 15-part season on iTunes. Season 4 began airing on National Geographic as of 2 August 2021.

== Series overview ==
Series	Episodes	Originally released		
Series	Episodes	First released	Last released	Network
1	15	28 May 2018	5 November 2018	National Geographic
2	18	3 June 2019	14 October 2019	National Geographic
3	10	9 February 2020	23 June 2020	National Geographic
4	8	2 August 2021	23 August 2021	National Geographic
5	6	29 November 2022	3 January 2023	National Geographic
6	6	5 March 2023	9 April 2023	National Geographic
Specials	4	30 July 2018	16 August 2021	National Geographic

== Background and production ==
=== Visual effects ===
The primary visual effects vendor for all series and specials was Bristol, UK based graphics studio 422 South.

Last Pixel has provided over 70 minutes of computer-generated imagery (CGI) and other visual effects for 5 episodes of season 2.

== Episodes ==
=== Season 1 (2018) ===
No. in series	No. in season	Title	Directed by	Written by	Original release date	U.S. viewers (millions)
1	1	"Villains of the Underworld"	Wayne Abbott & Sophie Elwin-Harris	Christopher Blow & Sophie Elwin-Harris	28 May 2018	0.63
2	2	"Nazi Secrets"	Marc Tiley	Marc Tiley	28 May 2018	0.63
3	3	"Gulf of Mexico"	Anthony Barwell	Anthony Barwell	4 June 2018	0.76
4	4	"Lost Worlds of the Mediterranean"	Michael Davies & Sophie Elwin-Harris	TBA	11 June 2018	0.77
5	5	"Sunken Treasures"	Marc Tiley	Marc Tiley	18 June 2018	0.79
6	6	"Legends of Atlantis"	Peter Rees, Alex Barry, and Anthony Barwell	TBA	25 June 2018	0.67
7	7	"Deadly Pacific"	John Hyde	John Hyde, Alex Barry, and Chris Thorburn	2 July 2018	0.77
8	8	"Egypt's Lost Wonders"	Sophie Elwin-Harris	Sophie Elwin-Harris	9 July 2018	0.66
9	9	"Mysteries of the China Seas"	Chris Thorburn	Chris Thorburn	16 July 2018	0.63
10	10	"Ultimate Battleships"	Alex West	Alex West	23 July 2018	0.62
11	11	"Malaysia Airlines 370"	Peter Rees	Peter Rees	30 July 2018	0.74
12	12	"Sunken Cities"	TBA	TBA	15 October 2018	0.46
13	13	"Treasures of the Deep"	TBA	TBA	22 October 2018	0.38
14	14	"Sunken War Ships"	TBA	TBA	29 October 2018	0.39
15	15	"Stormy Seas"	TBA	TBA	5 November 2018	0.45

=== Season 2 (2019) ===
No. in series	No. in season	Title	Directed by	Written by	Original release date	U.S. viewers (millions)
16	1	"Secrets of D-Day"	Dominic Ozanne	Dominic Ozanne	3 June 2019	0.80
17	2	"Secrets of New York City"	James Mair	James Mair	10 June 2019	0.69
18	3	"Killer U-Boats"	Alex West	Alex West	17 June 2019	0.65
19	4	"Buried Secrets of the Gold Rush"	Charlie Smith	Charlie Smith	1 July 2019	0.45
20	5	"Secrets of the Civil War"	Marc Tiley	Marc Tiley	22 July 2019	0.51
21	6	"Lost Nukes of the Cold War"	Sam Taplin	Sam Taplin	29 July 2019	0.55
22	7	"Secrets of the Spanish Armada"	Richard Max	TBA	5 August 2019	0.52
23	8	"Pacific War Megawrecks"	Malcolm Clark & George Pagliero	TBA	12 August 2019	0.62
24	9	"Sunken Weapons of War"	TBA	TBA	12 August 2019	0.47
25	10	"America's Lost Treasures"	TBA	TBA	19 August 2019	0.51
26	11	"Disasters at Sea"	TBA	TBA	19 August 2019	0.46
27	12	"Thai Cave Rescue"	Sophie Elwin-Harris	Sophie Elwin-Harris	2 September 2019	0.46
28	13	"London's Secret History"	Sam Miller	Sam Miller	9 September 2019	0.34
29	14	"Secrets of Loch Ness"	Charlie Bingham & Malcolm Clark	Charlie Bingham & Malcolm Clark	16 September 2019	0.46
30	15	"Hitler's Killer Warships"	Alex Hearle	Alex Hearle	23 September 2019	0.35
31	16	"Lost Giants"	Marc Tiley	Marc Tiley	30 September 2019	0.49
32	17	"Pacific Shockwave"	Elliot Kew	Elliot Kew	7 October 2019	0.36
33	18	"Rise of the Roman Empire"	Savas Georgalis	TBA	14 October 2019	0.45

=== Season 3 (2020) ===
No. in series	No. in season	Title	Directed by	Written by	Original release date	U.S. viewers (millions)
34	1	"America's Last Slave Ship"	Vicky Matthews	TBA	9 February 2020	0.46
35	2	"The Atomic Ghost Fleet"	Ludo Graham	Ludo Graham	5 May 2020	0.46
36	3	"The Viking Seas"	Dan Clifton	Dan Clifton	5 May 2020	0.44
37	4	"Egypt's Sunken City"	Olive King	Olive King	12 May 2020	0.31
38	5	"The Battle of Britain"	Daniel Edwards	Daniel Edwards	19 May 2020	0.35
39	6	"Pirate Ships of the Caribbean"	Paul Copeland	Paul Copeland	26 May 2020	0.34
40	7	"The American Revolution"	Sam Taplin	Sam Taplin	2 June 2020	0.39
41	8	"Raiders of the Civil War"	Tomasz Cebula	Tomasz Cebula	9 June 2020	0.55
42	9	"The Last Wrecks of WWII"	Wayne Derrick	TBA	16 June 2020	0.41
43	10	"Chicago"	Rupert Edwards	TBA	23 June 2020	0.47

=== Season 4 (2021) ===
No. in series	No. in season	Title	Directed by	Written by	Original release date	U.S. viewers (millions)
44	1	"The Wild West"	Wayne Derrick	TBA	2 August 2021	0.40
45	2	"The Battle for the Black Swan"	Christopher Riley	Christopher Riley	2 August 2021	0.37
46	3	"Hollywood"	Adam Warner	TBA	9 August 2021	0.39
47	4	"The First Americans"	Chris Thorburn	TBA	9 August 2021	0.40
48	5	"Venice's Lost Empire"	Malcolm Clark and Yavar Abbas	TBA	9 August 2021	0.43
49	6	"Hurricane Apocalypse"	Tomasz Cebula	TBA	16 August 2021	0.51
50	7	"The Great Barrier Reef"	Anna Jeffries & Alex West	Bruce Kennedy	23 August 2021	0.41
51	8	"Sea of Secrets"	Catrin Evans	Bruce Kennedy	23 August 2021	N/A

=== Season 5 (2022–23) ===
No. in series	No. in season	Title	Directed by	Written by	Original release date	U.S. viewers (millions)
52	1	"The Secrets of Pompeii's Dead"	Vicky Matthews	TBA	29 November 2022	0.28
53	2	"Pearl Harbor"	Wayne Derrick	TBA	6 December 2022	N/A
54	3	"The Amber Room"	Laura Mulholland	TBA	13 December 2022	0.26
55	4	"Ancient Maya Resurrection"	Dina Mufti	TBA	20 December 2022	0.26
56	5	"The Alamo"	Tomasz Cebula	TBA	27 December 2022	0.25
57	6	"Narcos"	Christopher Riley	TBA	3 January 2023	0.31

=== Season 6 (2023) ===
No. in series	No. in season	Title	Directed by	Written by	Original release date	U.S. viewers (millions)
58	1	"Alaska"	TBA	TBA	5 March 2023	N/A
Draining Alaska's extreme north reveals the graveyard of a tragic fleet.
59	2	"Rise of the Mob"	Katie Mathews	Katie Mathews	12 March 2023	N/A
Lost wrecks reveal how the Mob gained power and wealth in 1920s America.
60	3	"Secrets of the Dinosaurs"	TBA	TBA	19 March 2023	N/A
From Patagonia to Canada paleontologists uncover the Real Jurassic Americas.
61	4	"The Myth of the Pacific Pirate"	TBA	TBA	26 March 2023	N/A
Archaeologists uncover the truth behind the legend of a treasure ship.
62	5	"Invasion USA"	Steve O'Hagan	Steve O'Hagan	2 April 2023	N/A
A U.S. flagship wreck reveals the British burning of the White House in 1814.
63	6	"$20 Million Time Bomb"	Christopher Riley	Christopher Riley	9 April 2023	N/A
A bomb, murder, and a foiled multi-million insurance scam on the high seas

== Specials ==
No. in series	No. in season	Title	Directed by	Written by	Original release date	U.S. viewers (millions)
SP1	Special–1	"Ghost Ships of the Atlantic"	Jobim Sampson & Mike Slee	Jobim Sampson, Christopher Blow, and Max Salomon	30 July 2018	0.74
SP2	Special–2	"Top Secret Wrecks"	TBA	TBA	6 January 2020	0.48
SP3	Special–3	"Arctic War"	Steven Clarke	TBA	2 August 2021	N/A
SP4	Special–4	"The Mississippi River"	TBA	TBA	16 August 2021	0.54

== Accolades ==
Association	Year (Note: Indicates the year of ceremony. Each year is linked to the article about the awards held that year, wherever possible.)	Category	Nominee(s) / Work	Result	Ref(s)
New York Festivals TV & Film Awards	2019	Bronze World Medal – Documentary (History & Society)	Sophie Elwin-Harris, Imogen Walford, Dave Corfield, Crispin Sadler, Phil Craig, Mark Fielder, Andrew Ogilvie, Mark Robertson (for "Egypt's Lost Wonders")	Won	
New York Festivals TV & Film Awards	2020	Silver – Documentary (History & Society)	Sophie Elwin-Harris, Dave Corfield, Mike Denny, Crispin Sadler, Phil Craig, Tom Adams (for "Thai Cave Rescue")	Won	
New York Festivals TV & Film Awards	2021	Finalist – Documentary (History & Society)	Crispin Sadler, Phil Craig, Vicky Matthews, Simon Pearce, Dave Corfield (for "America's Last Slave Ship")	Finalist	
New York Festivals TV & Film Awards	2021	Silver – Documentary (Science & Technology)	Crispin Sadler, Phil Craig, Ludo Graham, Dave Corfield, Jonnie Morris (for "The Atomic Ghost Fleet")	Won	
New York Festivals TV & Film Awards	2022	GOLD – Documentary (History & Society)	Crispin Sadler, Phil Craig, Nigel Walk, Christopher Riley, Steve Perring, Dave Corfield, Benjamin Stott (for "The Battle for the Black Swan")	Won	
New York Festivals TV & Film Awards	2022	GOLD – Documentary (Science & Technology)	Crispin Sadler, Phil Craig, Johanna Woolford Gibbon, Chris Thorburn, Dave Corfield, Simon Pearce, Chris Mallett (for "The First Americans")	Won	
New York Festivals TV & Film Awards	2024	GOLD – Documentary (History & Society)	Crispin Sadler, Nigel Walk, Christopher Riley, Alex Hanks, Vanessa Heron, Dave Corfield, Oliver Baker (for "$20 Million Time Bomb")	Won	
Videographer Awards	2019	Award of Excellence – Cinematography	Mark Molesworth	Won	
Videographer Awards	2020	Award of Excellence – Cinematography	Mark Molesworth (for "Secrets of New York City")	Won	
