= Jade City =

Human settlement in Canada

Coordinates: 59.2581°N 129.6248°W

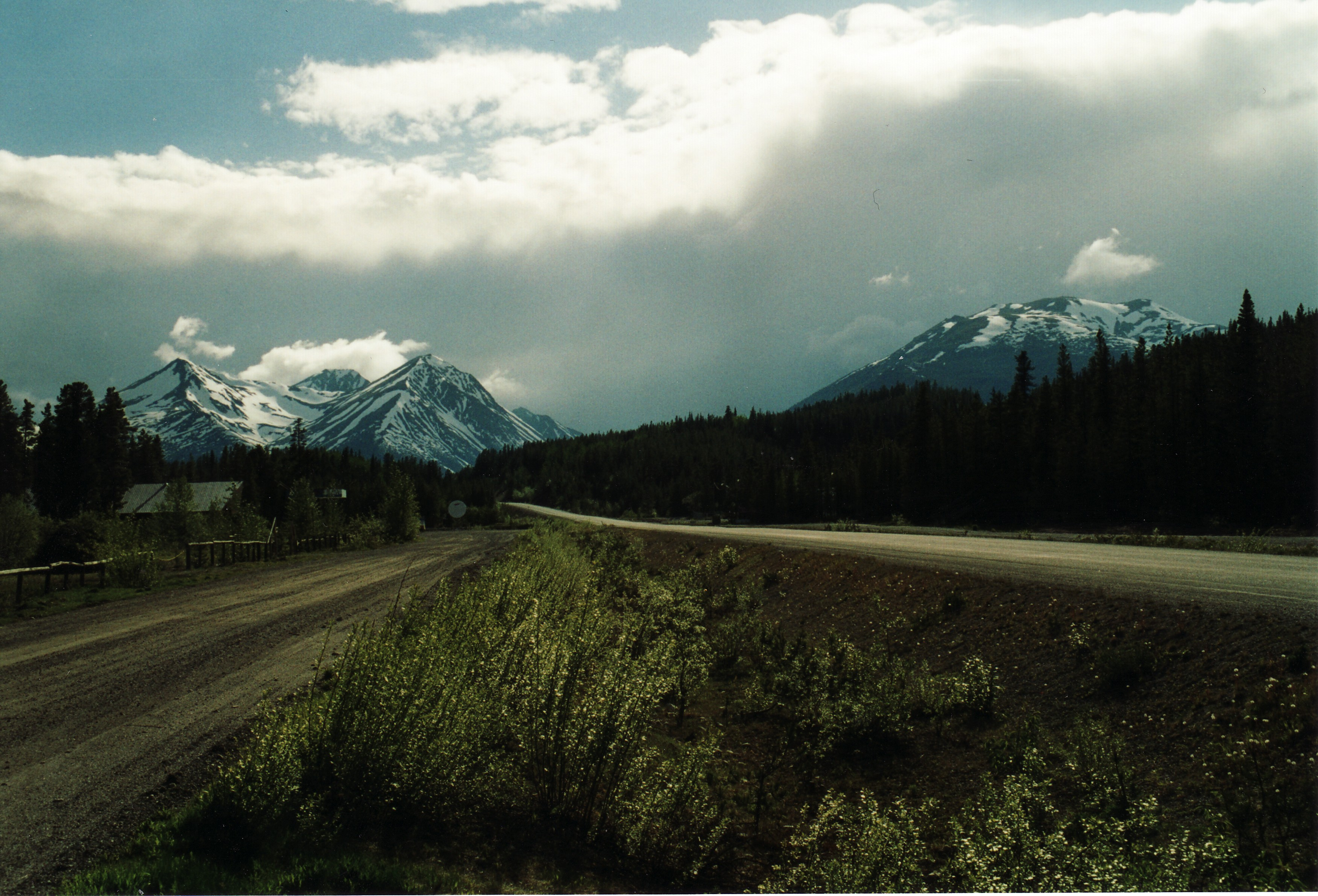
Jade City, Cassiar

Jade City is a settlement in northwestern British Columbia, Canada, near the Yukon, located on Highway 37, west of Good Hope Lake and close to Cassiar, in the Cassiar Highlands. The region around Jade City is rich with serpentinite (a jade precursor), greenstone (jade look-a-likes), and Nephrite jade. Jade City is by road about 19 hours north of Greater Vancouver, and 1 hour south of the Yukon border. As of 2015, it had a population of about 30 people.

During the summer a church opens up to the public offering Sunday services. There are no gas stations or restaurants.

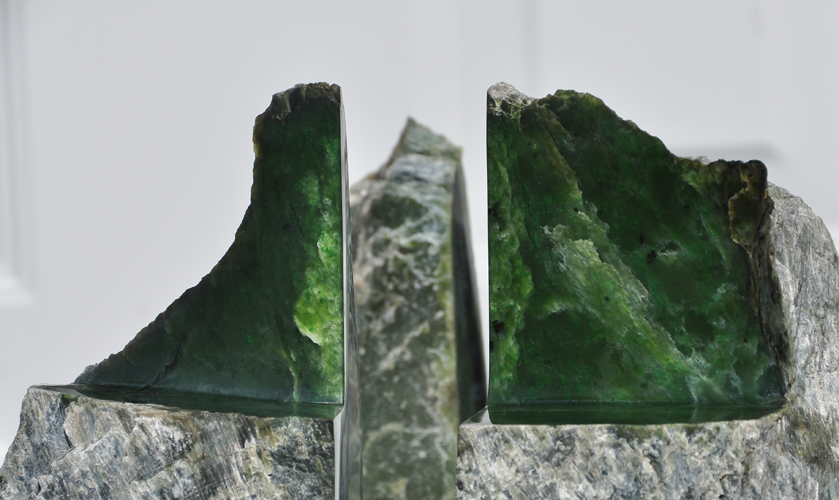
Jade from Jade City

The reality TV series Jade Fever documents the mining efforts of the Cassiar Mountain Jade Store, and the Bunce family. They mine hard rock deposits and placer deposits left by glaciers. The Bunce family has mined the area for jade for about 35 years, starting with Claudia Bunce's father, Steve Simonovic in 1985.
