= Aussie Lobster Men =

- Country of origin: Australia
- Original language: English
- No. of seasons: 2
- No. of episodes: 20

Production
- Executive producer: Darren Chau
- Producers: Celia Boden; Liam Taylor
- Running time: 30 minutes (inc. ads)
- Production companies: Fredbird Entertainment; Winning Post Productions

Original release
- Network: 7mate
- Release: 12 February 2019 – present

Aussie Lobster Men (also marketed as Giant Lobster Hunters) is an Australian reality television series which debuted on 12 February 2019 on 7mate. The series portrays the real life events of crews aboard commercial fishing vessels in the waters around Tasmania searching for Tasmanian rock lobsters.

10 episodes were produced for Season 1 following 25 fishermen over a 10-week period in 2018.

Season 2 was commissioned by Darren Chau for the Discovery Channel and premiered on 16 October 2019 across Foxtel and Sky (New Zealand).

== Background ==
The program received $200,000 funding from the Government of Tasmania in September 2018 with the series produced for $1.4 million overall. The series was commissioned for the Seven Network's male-skewing multichannel 7mate and is co-produced by Fredbird Entertainment and Tasmanian-based Winning Post Productions, and distributed internationally by TCB Media Rights.

== See also ==
- Aussie Gold Hunters
- Outback Opal Hunters
