= Yukon Gold (TV series) =

Canadian reality television series

- Genre: Documentary, Reality
- Written by: Michael Lavoie (Season 1); Aynsley Vogel (Season 2)
- Narrated by: Bill Courage
- Opening theme: "Ain't No Rest for the Wicked" by Cage the Elephant
- Composer: Adam Lastiwka
- Country of origin: Canada
- Original language: English
- No. of seasons: 5
- No. of episodes: 50

Production
- Executive producers: David Paperny; Cal Shumiatcher; Audrey Mehler; Beth Wichterich
- Producers: David Paperny; Cal Shumiatcher; Vera Lubimova; Christine Brandt
- Production locations: Klondike region, Yukon (Seasons 1 – 5); Atlin Mining District, Atlin, British Columbia (Season 4); Cassiar Country, British Columbia (Season 1)
- Cinematography: Simon Schneider
- Running time: 60 minutes
- Production companies: Paperny Entertainment (Entertainment One)

Original release
- Network: History Television
- Release: March 13, 2013 – May 3, 2017

Yukon Gold was a Canadian reality television series produced by Paperny Entertainment that aired on History Television. The series followed four or five placer mining crews as they searched for gold over the four-month Yukon mining season.

The series was acquired in the United States by the National Geographic Channel and aired starting in 2013.

On June 1, 2017, Paperny Entertainment announced on the show's Twitter feed that after five seasons, Yukon Gold had "ended its run".

== Summary ==
In the first season, miners Ken Foy, Al McGregor, Bernie Kreft, and Karl Knutson each led one of the crews.

Cam Johnson's group replaced Bernie Kreft's crew in the second season.

Nika Guilbault & Chris St. Jean's group replaced "Big Al" McGregor's crew in the third season.

In the fourth season, the Bernie Kreft and "Big Al" McGregor crews rejoined the show, alongside the operations of Ken Foy & Guillaume Brodeur, Karl Knutson, and Nika Guilbault & Chris St. Jean.

In the fifth season, the operations of Karl Knutson, Bernie Kreft, and Ken Foy & Guillaume Brodeur left the show, while the crews of "Big Al" McGregor and Nika Guilbault & Chris St. Jean returned. They were joined by the crews of Riley Gibson & Ed Long, and Andy Tai & Paul "P.J." Joseph.

== Episodes ==
=== Seasons ===
Season	Episodes	Originally released	
Season	Episodes	First released	Last released
1	10	March 13, 2013	May 15, 2013
2	10	February 26, 2014	April 30, 2014
3	10	February 25, 2015	April 29, 2015
Season 3 special		May 6, 2015	
4	10	February 17, 2016	April 20, 2016
Season 4 special		April 27, 2016	
5	8	March 15, 2017	May 3, 2017

=== Season 1 (2013) ===
No. overall	No. in season	Title	Original release date
1	1	"Sluice or Die"	March 13, 2013
Gold mining season begins in Dawson City, Yukon, and the countdown to winter is on. Newcomer "Big Al" worries his season could be over before it starts when his excavator named 'Big Girl' fails. Further south, Bernie struggles not only to teach his young sons how to be miners, but also to find gold. In Moose Creek, best friends Ken and Guillaume cannot get their sluice machine "The Beast" up and running – and without it, their entire season could be a bust.
2	2	"No Deaths, No Worries"	March 20, 2013
It is week three for mining crew Ken and Guillaume and non-stop rain jeopardizes their cut. On Sulphur Creek, young crew boss Karl has no sluice machine, and no sluicer means no gold. Karl's father Marty, a highly respected self-made miner, builds a new one from scratch. While Karl waits, he struggles to keep his crew on task – and live up to his father's high expectations. Big Al tests new strategies – and new equipment – on a fresh claim. If only he could keep his machines running.
3	3	"The Curse of Moose Creek"	March 27, 2013
Mining season in the North is in full swing, but for Ken and Guillaume equipment problems mean they are only sluicing half of what they should be. Karl must deal with mistakes his crew make and design flaws on the massive sluicer his dad Marty built. Bernie packs it in at McDame and moves his operation to Snow Creek, hoping his fortune is about to change.
4	4	"Gold Fever!"	April 3, 2013
With the weeks passing quickly, Ken and Guillaume's dreams of striking it big are starting to fade as they face continual equipment breakdowns and a crew member who goes AWOL. Bernie's decision to move to Snow Creek seems to be paying off, if only he can get his sons to step up and meet his expectations. Al McGregor's pay streak is threatened when he breaks a hitch trying to move his sluice plant.
5	5	"Hard Days Night"	April 10, 2013
Karl Knutson is shocked to learn just how quickly the season is passing, and with one water issue after another, his opportunity for a big payday is dwindling just as fast. A faulty clutch on Al McGregor's sluice machine results in a shutdown; it's a race to get it fixed and get back to work, even if it means working around the clock.
6	6	"Never Say Die"	April 17, 2013
Ken and Guillaume try to reverse their bad luck by moving across Moose Creek. Bernie has to deal with mistakes made by his junior crew. And Karl's night crew is starting to slow him down.
7	7	"Run for the Narrows"	April 24, 2013
Guillaume is ready to give up on "Bad Attitude" altogether, potentially sending half the crew home early. A frozen sluice box traps Karl's gold causing him to confront his crew. The crew lets off some steam on a moose hunt. Over at Indian River, Hiro battles beavers for precious sluicing water and Big Al decides to try an unconventional mining technique.
8	8	"Winter Gamble"	May 1, 2013
Ken makes a dangerous drive for fuel when winter hits early. Matt's mistake could cost him his job. Karl has a bad day with a frozen sluice plant, broken truck, burst pipe, and a visit from Dad. And Bernie's pay streak suddenly ends just as he loses a crew member.
9	9	"The Last Stand"	May 8, 2013
Ken moves The Beast and finally hits a mother lode of gold. But breakdowns could end Bernie's season early. And Big Al moves his sluice plant to its final site – his profit pit.
10	10	"Freeze Up"	May 15, 2013
In a dangerous attempt to replenish fuel, Ken risks everything to keep his sluice plant running before it and his pay dirt are covered in snow. Karl ignores his father's advice, intent on scooping up whatever unfrozen ground remains. And Big Al's rookie season on Indian River comes to a close, but mounting equipment failures and a tired crew may prevent him from reaching his magic number.

=== Season 2 (2014) ===
No. overall	No. in season	Title	Original release date
11	1	"Behind the Eight Ball"	February 26, 2014
Karl hopes to score 100 ounces of gold in one week. Ken weighs the cost of an eager but careless hand who keeps breaking equipment. Big Al has to replace big iron without a big payday.
12	2	"In for a Penny, in for a Pound"	March 5, 2014
Ken sinks big money to dig out a narrow cut. New miner Cam's big payday is threatened by fire. Karl's experienced but unreliable operator forces his hand.
13	3	"It's Ours to Take"	March 12, 2014
Ken loses a machine when he can't afford to pay his debts and his crew. Big Al smells gold in the ground, but gets shut down by equipment breakdowns. Dennis has to scrape $10,000 out of hostile ground to replace a part or face permanent shutdown.
14	4	"What Doesn't Kill You..."	March 19, 2014
Ken fights a double mutiny when his plant and a crew-member go rogue. Cam's veteran welder is struck down and airlifted to hospital. Karl's crew encounters a bear.
15	5	"Know When to Hold 'Em"	March 26, 2014
Ken's wife visits to discover he's on the verge of going broke. Big Al's excavator takes a nosedive. Karl's season is threatened by permafrost.
16	6	"Between a Rock and a Hard Place"	April 2, 2014
Dennis's hunt for gold proves unsuccessful. Ken breaks a machine in his haste to sluice. Karl's cut floods, putting his season in jeopardy.
17	7	"All That Glitters Is Not Gold"	April 9, 2014
Ken takes a roll in his bulldozer. Beavers threaten to shut down Big Al. Karl's loader springs a leak.
18	8	"In It to Win It"	April 16, 2014
Crews are racing to rip through ground as winter descends. Ken and right-hand man Guillaume fight to keep the Beast sluicing through subzero temperatures only to discover the dirt they've banked on has run dry. Cam's plans to mine an ancient waterfall go sideways when the treacherous ground threatens to bench his iron for good. Karl and right-hand man Kyle's mechanical skills are put to the test when the season takes its toll on Sulphur Creek's operation.
19	9	"Know When to Fold 'Em"	April 23, 2014
The short Yukon gold mining season is almost over, and crews are battling the elements in a mad push for gold. Ken is forced to call in reinforcements when winter hits Moose Creek hard. Cam hits an impenetrable ice wall that freezes him out of his cut and moves to risky new ground only to have crucial iron go down. Big Al's plans to rip through promising dirt are sidelined when his only stripping dozer suffers a catastrophic breakdown that puts right-hand man Hiro's mechanical skills to the ultimate test.
20	10	"Know When to Run"	April 30, 2014
The miners battle nature's wrath in an epic final push for gold. Ken's bid to pull 100 ounces out of hot ground goes sideways when the mine runs out of fuel, forcing him to shut down sluicing and fight his way up Moose Creek's treacherous road in a desperate bid to get to a fuel station at the top. Karl's race to mine Sulphur Creek out so he can stake his own claim is benched when one of his crew deals his prize sluice plant a near fatal blow. Big Al follows his gut to high-stakes ground only to be shut out when his only stripping dozer goes down for the count.

=== Season 3 (2015) ===
No. overall	No. in season	Title	Original release date
21	1	"Fresh Start"	February 25, 2015
Ken and Guillaume journey over a treacherous mountain pass. Cam stresses over getting Oklahoma welder Gary into the country. Mining couple Nika and Chris have a rough start to their season.
22	2	"Game Changer"	March 4, 2015
Cam gambles on an expensive new water cannon. A broken part on his sluice plant slows Karl's progress. Ken and Guillaume's first gold test is a dud.
23	3	"Time Crunch"	March 11, 2015
Cam and his crew rush to start sluicing Donovan Cut. Karl comes up with a clever way to motivate his crew. Chris and Nika's operation is halted by a sluice plant breakdown.
24	4	"Under Pressure"	March 18, 2015
Chris and Nika butt heads while moving to a new cut. Cam struggles with machine failures and contaminated fuel. Ken and Guillaume find traces of gold.
25	5	"Divine Intervention"	March 25, 2015
Frozen ground threatens Cam's season. Ken and Guillaume abandon Arizona Creek. Karl gambles with broken equipment.
26	6	"Financial Crisis"	April 1, 2015
Chris and Nika face financial hardship. Cam's son-in-law is determined to find gold. Ken and Guillaume find a prime location to salvage their season.
27	7	"Bedrock Blues"	April 8, 2015
Karl hopes to make a profit at Last Chance. Chris and Nika move to Stowe Creek. Cam and his wife melt the gold they've collected and find they're way below their target.
28	8	"Desperation Mode"	April 15, 2015
Chris and Nika's mine hand Charles gets injured, leaving them short-handed. Cam gives Donovan Cut one final try to save his season. Ken and Guillaume up their recovery system in hopes of catching finer gold.
29	9	"Home Stretch"	April 22, 2015
Ken and Guillaume face a dangerous situation. Karl finally hits a pay streak. Cam tries to finish his season on a positive note.
30	10	"Final Push"	April 29, 2015
Nika and Chris push through the final week of the season. Low temperatures freeze Karl's sluicing plant. Ken and Guillaume get a huge surprise.

==== Season 3 special (2015) ====
No. overall	No. in season	Title	Original release date
31	11	"Looking Back"	May 6, 2015
In a special retrospective episode, the miners recap their highs and lows of the season, and reveal their plans for next season.

=== Season 4 (2016) ===
No. overall	No. in season	Title	Original release date
32	1	"Homecoming"	February 17, 2016
Now in a wheelchair, Big Al returns to gold mining; Bernie clashes with his son; Karl finds gold right away; Chris reunites with Nika and their kids.
33	2	"Treasure Hunt"	February 24, 2016
Karl finds new gold with old maps; Nika and Chris find their first gold of the season; Bernie struggles to get started. Permit problems stall the beginning of Ken and Guillaume's season.
34	3	"Hard Rain, Bad Luck"	March 2, 2016
Karl struggles to find gold after a heavy rain; Nika and Chris's new crew member Nick gets their only dozer hopelessly stuck in the mud of the new cut; Big Al makes steady progress rehabilitating, but has a disappointing gold haul; Bernie pushes his sluice plant "Bouncing Betty" to the limit.
35	4	"Embrace the Chaos"	March 9, 2016
Nika and Chris face an excavator breakdown and water problems; just when Ken and Guillaume's mining permits are approved, Ken's wife wants him home for their child's birth; Bernie's son Jarret goes AWOL. Karl has a poor cleanup after betting on unproven ground.
36	5	"For Blood or Money"	March 16, 2016
Big Al's gamble pays off; Bernie argues with his son Justin; Ken and Guillaume sluice before Ken has to leave for his child's birth; Karl's team tries to sluice 200 ounces of gold in a week.
37	6	"Desperate Times"	March 23, 2016
Nika and Chris face an excavator repair they can't afford; Guillaume has trouble while Ken is away; Karl asks his family for help; Bernie gets a surprise.
38	7	"Hurts Like Hell"	March 30, 2016
Breakdowns shut down Nika and Chris's mine; Big Al remembers his wife's death; Ken and Guillaume try to save their season; Bernie and his team have a big payoff.
39	8	"Double Down"	April 6, 2016
Nika's little brother Daylen gets in the way; when his main sluicing water pump stops, Big Al is shut down; Ken and Guillaume's two sluice plant plan turns into a disaster; Karl and his crew go to a charity golf tournament.
40	9	"Old Timers' Revenge"	April 13, 2016
Big Al revives an old passive "push-in (aka Pearson) sluice box" in a last-ditch effort to keep sluicing; Karl brings in help to hit his goal; Chris and Nika get help from Chris's family when they check their gold haul. Bernie finds extensive Gold Rush-era mine shafts under his claim, ending his season.
41	10	"Race to the Finish"	April 20, 2016
Big Al risks his health to break even; Nika's brother Daylen makes a surprising decision; Ken and Guillaume dig deep; Karl tries to top his goal.

==== Season 4 special (2016) ====
No. overall	No. in season	Title	Original release date
42	11	"Grit, Guts & Glory"	April 27, 2016
A special retrospective episode of the previous four seasons featuring all six crews. Includes some scenes never before broadcast.

=== Season 5 (2017) ===
No. overall	No. in season	Title	Original release date
43	1	"Strike While the Iron Is Hot"	March 15, 2017
After an early setback, Big Al questions his instincts; Ed and Riley struggle to transport a sluice plant to their remote mine site; bad weather causes a roadblock for P.J. and Andy.
44	2	"Not Beaten"	March 22, 2017
Big Al's health declines; Chris St. Jean deals with a rookie mine hand; P.J. and Andy face floods and breakdowns.
45	3	"The Hiro Curse"	March 29, 2017
Hiro's Curse returns for Big Al; unstable ground shuts down Chris and Nika.
46	4	"Hard Lessons"	April 5, 2017
Chris risks his season on a new cut; Andy tries to manage the mine alone while P.J. heads south to visit his family; Ed and Riley go hunting, but head back to their claim when their sluice plant's bearings act up.
47	5	"No Backing Down"	April 12, 2017
Desperate, Big Al pushes Hiro to his limit; Chris looks to salvage his season; P.J. and Andy's camp experiences a mini-revolt.
48	6	"The Cost of Gold"	April 19, 2017
Big Al's plans are thwarted by no-show staff; P.J.'s wife has concerns regarding mining and their family; Ed and Riley run out of fuel.
49	7	"The Razor's Edge"	April 26, 2017
P.J. and Andy's investor gives them an ultimatum; Chris discovers something that could lead to a big payout; Ed and Riley's season may end early.
50	8	"Winter's Grasp"	May 3, 2017
Al faces breakdowns that threaten his profit; desperate, P.J. and Andy start a night shift; Ed and Riley make a final effort to prove themselves.

== Cast ==
=== Season 1 ===
- Don Kenzie – placer gold cleaner, Dawson City, Yukon
- Ken & Guillaume's group
  - Ken Foy, second generation miner
  - Guillaume Brodeur – Ken's right-hand man, mechanic
  - Dennis Foy – first generation miner, Ken's father
  - Kina – bookkeeper, Ken's wife
  - Martyn, mine hand
  - Matt, mine hand
  - Wes, mine hand
  - Tanner, mine hand (episodes 1 – 4)
  - Megan, camp cook (episodes 1 – 4)
- Al McGregor's group
  - "Big Al", Al McGregor – new miner
  - Hiro, mechanic
  - Colleen, Al's wife
  - Eric – mine hand, friend of Al
  - Jeremy, mine hand
  - Rebecca, mine hand
  - Jim – night shift mine hand, friend of Al
  - Mike – night shift mine hand, friend of Al
- Bernie Kreft's group
  - Bernie Kreft – prospector, new miner
  - Jarret Kreft, son of Bernie
  - Justin Kreft, son of Bernie
  - Kyle – mine hand, friend of Jarret & Justin
- Karl Knutson's group
  - Karl Knutson, second generation miner
  - Marty Knutson – first generation miner, Karl's father
  - Kyle – Karl's right-hand man, mechanic
  - Andrew – mine hand, friend of Karl
  - Leigh – mine hand, friend of Karl
  - Darwin – mine hand, friend of Karl

=== Season 2 ===
- Don Kenzie – placer gold cleaner, Dawson City, Yukon
- Ken & Guillaume's group
  - Ken Foy, second generation miner
  - Guillaume Brodeur – Ken's right-hand man, mechanic
  - Kina – bookkeeper, Ken's wife
  - Matt, mine hand
  - Martyn, mine hand
  - Jethro, mine hand (episodes 7 – 10)
  - Curtis, camp cook
  - Dan & John Jones – claim owners
  - Riley, mine hand (episode 4)
  - Dennis Foy – first generation miner, Ken's father (episodes 9 & 10)
- Al McGregor's group
  - "Big Al", Al McGregor – miner
  - Hiro – Al's right-hand man, mechanic
  - Eric, friend of Al
  - Jeremy – mine hand, friend of Al
  - Carl – mine hand, friend of Al
  - Doug – mine hand, friend of Al
  - "Skin" – mine hand, friend of Al
  - Mike – night shift mine hand, friend of Al
- Cam Johnson's group
  - Cam Johnson – miner, claim partner
  - Dennis Poirer – mechanic, claim partner and Cam's brother-in-law (episodes 1 – 6)
  - Kevin – miner, claim partner
  - Beven – mine hand, Cam's brother
  - Jeanine – camp cook, Cam's wife
  - Ashlyn – mine hand, Cam's daughter
  - Chase Edwards, mine hand
  - Joel, mine hand
  - Gary Ramsay, mine hand (episodes 1 – 4)
- Karl Knutson's group
  - Karl Knutson – second generation miner
  - Marty Knutson – first generation miner, Karl's father
  - Kyle – Karl's right-hand man, mechanic
  - Andrew – mine hand, friend of Karl
  - Doug – mine hand, friend of Karl
  - Erik, camp cook
  - Jayme – mine hand, friend of Karl
  - Darwin – mine hand, friend of Karl (episodes 1 & 2)

=== Season 3 ===
- Simon Masoneuve – placer gold buyer, Dawson City, Yukon
- Ken & Guillaume's group
  - Ken Foy, miner
  - Guillaume Brodeur – Ken's right-hand man, mechanic
  - Stewart Schmidt – claim backer, Arizona Creek
  - Tom Morgan, prospector
  - Gary Crawford – claim owner, Cripple Hill
  - Kim Bowlby, Devin Gold Exploration
  - Kina – bookkeeper, Ken's wife (special episode)
- Nika & Chris's group
  - Nika Guilbault – miner, claim partner
  - Chris St. Jean – miner, claim partner
  - Zyla, their daughter
  - Charles, right-hand man
  - Shanelle, mine hand (episodes 3 – 7)
  - Shari, mine hand (episodes 3 – 6)
  - Adana, Nika's sister (episodes 1 – 7)
  - Sabine, Nika's mother (episodes 8 – 10)
  - Nevada, their daughter (special episode)
  - Hunter, their son (special episode)
- Cam Johnson's group
  - Cam Johnson, miner
  - Jeanine, Cam's wife
  - Caleb, Cam's son
  - Ashlyn – mine hand, Cam's daughter
  - Jasmine – camp cook, Cam's daughter
  - Chase Edwards – mine hand, Cam's son-in-law
  - "Oklahoma" Gary Ramsay, mine hand (episodes 1 – 6)
  - Aron – mine hand, friend of Cam
  - Jake, mine hand
  - Armon Johnson – mine hand, Cam's brother
  - Lewis – mine hand, Cam's uncle
  - Jeff Bond – geologist, Yukon Geological Survey; Yukon Department of Energy, Mines and Resources
  - Marcel Hebert, hammer drill operator
- Karl Knutson's group
  - Karl Knutson – second generation miner
  - Marty Knutson, first generation miner, Karl's father
  - Maryann Knutson – first generation miner, Karl's mother
  - Kyle – Karl's right-hand man, mechanic
  - Jayme, friend of Karl
  - Andrew, friend of Karl
  - Doug, friend of Karl

=== Season 4 ===
- "Sunny" – gold buyer, Dawson City, Yukon
- Don Kenzie – placer gold cleaner, Dawson City
- Darren Hunter – placer gold buyer, Dawson City
- Ken & Guillaume's group
  - Ken Foy, miner
  - Guillaume Brodeur – Ken's right-hand man, mechanic
  - Matt, mine hand
  - Jethro, mine hand
  - Keigan, mine hand (episodes 5 – 10)
  - Charles, mine hand (episodes 6 – 10)
  - Kina – bookkeeper, Ken's wife (episodes 4 & 5)
  - Liam, their son (special episode)
- Al McGregor's group
  - "Big Al", Al McGregor – miner
  - Tamsin, Al's caregiver and assistant
  - Hiro – Al's right-hand man, mechanic
  - "Skin" – mine hand, friend of Al
  - Doug – mine hand, friend of Al
  - Bryan, mine hand (episodes 9 – 10)
- Nika & Chris's group
  - Nika Guilbault – miner, claim partner
  - Chris St. Jean – miner, claim partner
  - Zyla, their daughter
  - Hunter, their son
  - Nevada, their daughter
  - Sabine, Nika's mother
  - Adana, Nika's sister (episode 7)
  - Betty – first generation miner, Chris's grandmother (episode 9)
  - Perry St. Jean – miner, Chris's father (episode 9)
  - Nick, mine hand
  - Lindsay – mine hand, friend of Chris
  - Daylen – mine hand, Nika's brother (episodes 6 – 10)
- Bernie Kreft's group
  - Bernie Kreft – prospector, miner
  - Jarret Kreft, Bernie's son
  - Justin Kreft, Bernie's son
  - Kyle – mine hand, friend of Jarret & Justin
  - Shari, Bernie's wife (episodes 5 – 7)
- Karl Knutson's group
  - Karl Knutson – second generation miner, mine owner, business partner
  - Marty Knutson – first generation miner, Karl's father, business partner
  - Maryann Knutson – first generation miner, Karl's mother, business partner (episode 10)
  - Tyson Knutson – mine hand, Karl's brother (episode 6)
  - Victoria – mine hand, Karl's girlfriend (episodes 9 & 10)
  - Kyle – Karl's right-hand man, mechanic
  - Doug – mine hand, friend of Karl
  - Jayme – mine hand, friend of Karl

=== Season 5 ===
- Don Kenzie – placer gold cleaner, Dawson City, Yukon
- "Sunny" – gold buyer, Dawson City
- Darren Hunter – placer gold buyer, Dawson City (episodes 5 & 7)
- Marty Knutson – Dawson City fabrication yard (episode 1)
- Al McGregor's group
  - "Big Al", Al McGregor – miner
  - Hiro – Al's right-hand man, mechanic (episodes 3 – 8)
  - "Skin" – crew hand, friend of Al
  - Freddy, crew hand
  - Scotty, crew hand
  - Todd, crew hand; night shift
  - Eric, night shift (episode 8)
  - Kyle – crew hand, night shift; Freddy's nephew (episodes 7 & 8)
  - Kevin Kivi – geologist, friend of Al (episodes 1 & 2, episode 5)
  - Annie – mother of Colleen, Al's wife (episode 8)
- Nika & Chris's group
  - Nika Guilbault – miner, claim partner
  - Chris St. Jean – miner, claim partner
  - Zyla, their daughter
  - Hunter, their son
  - Nevada, their daughter
  - Bernard Guilbault, Nika's father (episode 7)
  - Lindsay – mechanic, crew hand, friend of Chris (episodes 1 – 5)
  - Ryley, crew hand
  - David, crew hand
  - Kristen Kennedy – geologist, Yukon Department of Energy, Mines and Resources (episode 4)
  - Sydney Van Loon – geologist, Yukon Department of Energy, Mines and Resources (episode 4)
  - Jason – rock truck seller (episode 5)
  - Tyler – rock truck seller (episode 5)
- Andy & P.J.'s group
  - Andy Tai – miner, claim partner
  - Sam Tai – claim investor, Andy's father (episode 7)
  - Paul "P.J." Joseph – miner, claim partner
  - Natasha, P.J.'s wife (episode 6)
  - Makaio – Natasha & P.J.'s son (episode 6)
  - Jada – Natasha & P.J.'s daughter (episode 6)
  - Rob – mechanic, crew hand
  - Joel "Turbo" – crew hand, minority claim partner, night shift manager
  - Daniel, crew hand
  - Josh, crew hand
  - Samson, crew hand
  - Conor, crew hand
  - John, night shift (episode 8)
  - Dave, night shift (episode 8)
  - Ralph Nordling, claim owner (episode 6)
  - Karl Knutson – advisor, friend of Andy (episode 7)
- Riley & Ed's group
  - Riley Gibson – prospector, new miner, claim partner
  - Casey, Riley's wife
  - Jane – Casey & Riley's daughter
  - Ed Long – prospector, new miner, claim partner
  - Kristen – Ed's wife, crew hand
  - Ryker – Kristen & Ed's son
  - Rylan – Kristen & Ed's son
  - Andy, crew hand
  - Jared – mechanic, crew hand, night shift; Ed's cousin
  - Walter Trotter – Ed's father-in-law, claim investor, crew hand (episodes 1 – 4)
  - Chad – claim investor, crew hand (episodes 3 – 4)
  - Trevor – crew hand, night shift; Walter's son
  - Warren, crew hand
  - Chris – mechanic, Macon Industries Inc. (episode 4)
  - Gavin, mining engineer (episode 7)
  - Randy, mining engineer (episode 7)

== Locations ==
- 50 Mile Valley, Yukon — Andy & P.J.'s claim
- Arizona Creek (Yukon) — Ken & Guillaume's claim (season 3, episodes 1 – 5)
- Cripple Hill, Yukon / Bonanza Creek (Yukon) — Ken & Guillaume's claim (season 3, episodes 5 – 10)
- Indian River (Yukon) — Big Al's claim
- Last Chance Creek (Yukon) — Karl's claim (season 3, episodes 4 – 10; season 4)
- Little Blanche Creek (Yukon) — Bernie's claim (season 4)
- McDame Creek (British Columbia) — Bernie's claim (season 1, episodes 1 & 2)
- Moose Creek (Yukon) — Ken & Guillaume's claim (seasons 1 & 2)
- Rabbit Creek (Yukon) — Riley & Ed's claim
- Snow Creek (British Columbia) — Bernie's claim (season 1, episodes 3 – 9)
- Spruce Creek (British Columbia) — Ken & Guillaume's claim (season 4, episodes 4 – 10)
- Stowe Creek (Yukon) — Nika & Chris's claim
- Sulphur Creek (Yukon) — Karl's claim (seasons 1 & 2; season 3, episodes 1 – 5)
- Tenmile Creek (Yukon) — Cam's primary claim
  - Abraham Creek (Yukon) — Cam's secondary claim

== See also ==
- Gold Rush, another reality TV series with placer gold mining in the Klondike of the Yukon near Dawson City. "Big Al" McGregor makes a cameo appearance in Episode 5 of Season 13, entitled "Cheat Codes".
- Aussie Gold Hunters, another reality TV series with placer-style gold mining; set in the states of Western Australia, Victoria, and Queensland
