= Aussie Gold Hunters =

2016–present Australian television series

- Aussie Gold Hunters title card
- Genre: Reality
- Narrated by: Matt Dickson
- Country of origin: Australia
- Original language: English
- No. of series: 11
- No. of episodes: 127

Production
- Executive producers: Andrew Ogilvie; Andrea Quesnelle
- Producer: Electric Pictures
- Production location: Australia
- Running time: 60 minutes

Original release
- Network: Discovery Channel
- Release: 15 September 2016 – 29 October 2026

Aussie Gold Hunters is an Australian television show which follows crews of gold prospectors in Australia. It is produced by Electric Pictures and began on the Discovery Channel on 15 September 2016. The series has been a ratings success, and has gone on to air in 125 countries, including the United Kingdom.

In August 2022 the series was renewed for an eighth and ninth season, with season eight which premiered in 2023. Season seven concluded on 13 October 2022.

The series is presented as if factual television, but large portions of the shows are scripted and involve contrived scenarios.

== Premise ==
The series follows gold miners in various locations of Western Australia, Victoria and Queensland as they strive to reach their individually set season target (measured in troy ounces of gold). They use a variety of mining techniques including use of metal detectors of surface or excavated soil for gold nuggets; and sluicing, dry blowing or heap leaching for gold particles.

== Production ==
The first season of eight episodes produced by Electric Pictures premiered on 15 September 2016. In March 2017 the series was renewed for a 10 episode second season, which premiered on 6 July 2017. In March 2018 the series was renewed for a 13 episode third season, which premiered on 31 May 2018. In September 2018 the series was renewed for a 13 episode fourth season, which premiered on 2 May 2019. In October 2019 the series was renewed for 40 episodes across two seasons. The 20 episode fifth season premiered on 30 April 2020. Following the conclusion of the fifth season, three specials featuring highlights from the five seasons premiered on 17 September 2020. The sixth season initially premiered in the United Kingdom on Discovery+ on 22 February 2021 before premiering in Australia on Discovery Channel on 29 April 2021. In April 2021 it was announced the series had been renewed for a seventh and eighth season. The seventh season premiered on 2 June 2022. In August 2022, Warner Bros Discovery UK announced the series was renewed for an additional two series, with the eighth and ninth seasons to premiere in 2023 and 2024 respectively. The eighth season will see the return of six teams and the addition of two new teams.

== Cast ==
Name	Nickname	Seasons								
Name	Nickname	1	2	3	4	5	6	7	8	9
Christine and Greg Clark	The Gold Gypsies	Main								
Vernon Strange	The Dirt Dogs	Main								
Lindsay Ironside	The Dirt Dogs	Main								
Leon Marsh	The Dirt Dogs	Main								
Jake Larsen	The Dirt Dogs			Main						
Marko Smith	The Dirt Dogs			Main						
Kal Henderson, Leigh Henderson, Steve Bult	The Dirt Dogs				Main					
Henri Chassaing and Kellie Carter	—N/a	Main								
Rick Fishers	—N/a		Main							
Ted and Lecky Mahoney	—N/a		Main	Main						
Tyler Mahoney	—N/a			Main						
Alex Stead and Eric Richards	The Scrappers			Main						
Neville Perry and Mick Clark	Victoria Diggers				Main					
Marcus McGuire	—N/a					Main				
Linden Brownley	—N/a					Main				
Dale Harring	—N/a						Main			
Rob Dale and Rob ‘Turbo’ Linton	The Gold Timers					Main				
Shane Calegari	—N/a					Main				
Russell Nash	—N/a					Main				
Kate Dundas	—N/a								Main	
Amy Doherty	—N/a									Main
Paul Mackie, Jake Armstrong, John and Mike	The Dust Devils					Main				
Brent Shannon	The Poseidon Crew				Guest	Main				
Ethan West	The Poseidon Crew				Guest	Main				
Paul West	The Poseidon Crew							Main		
Caden Shannon	The Poseidon Crew								Main	
Neville Perry	The Poseidon Crew								Guest	Main
Jacqui Buzetti and Andrew Leahy	—N/a						Main			
Rob Beeton, Ryan Peters, Bridget, Levi North and Zane Mettner [S8]	The Ferals						Main			
Brad McGhie and Chris Smith	Gold Retrievers							Main		
Paul Mackie, Alex Stead and Melanie Wood	Gold Devils								Main	
Alan Williams and Caleb 'Salty' Davenport	—N/a								Main	
Vince Malacria, Bibbi Gerali and Murray Cox	—N/a								Main	
Brad McGhie, Wendy McGhie and Family	The McGhies									Main
Justin Borg, Chloe Boissier	Heli Hunters									Main
Brett Brumby and Kateva Dubberley	The Brumbies									Main

Not all the miners featured on the show are Australian. Lindsay Ironside was imported from Canada by Vernon Strange. Henri Chassaing came from Switzerland.

== Episodes ==
Series overview
Season	Episodes	Originally released	
Season	Episodes	First released	Last released
1	8	15 September 2016	3 November 2016
2	10	6 July 2017	7 September 2017
3	13	31 May 2018	23 August 2018
4	13	2 May 2019	25 July 2019
5	20	30 April 2020	10 September 2020
Specials	3	17 September 2020	1 October 2020
6	20	29 April 2021	23 September 2021
7	20	2 June 2022	13 October 2022

=== Season 1 (2016) ===
Aussie Gold Hunters season one episodes
No. overall	No. in season	Title	Original release date	Australia viewers
1	1	"3 Men and Gold"	15 September 2016	52,000
2	2	"Mech Disasters and a High-Stakes Gamble"	22 September 2016	50,000
3	3	"Uprooting and Salt-Lake Gold"	29 September 2016	N/A
4	4	"Big Storm and Big Finds"	6 October 2016	46,000
5	5	"All or Nothing and Gold Rich Patch"	13 October 2016	46,000
6	6	"Targets and Unwanted Guests"	20 October 2016	54,000
7	7	"Breakdowns and Complications"	27 October 2016	N/A
8	8	"Digging Deep, Risking Life and Limb"	3 November 2016	37,000

=== Season 2 (2017) ===
Aussie Gold Hunters season two episodes
No. overall	No. in season	Title	Original release date	Australia viewers
9	1	"New Dawn Rises"	6 July 2017	47,000
10	2	"Heartbreak and Ambition"	13 July 2017	47,000
11	3	"Resurrection"	20 July 2017	60,000
12	4	"Speccie Gold"	27 July 2017	70,000
13	5	"Legends and Lore"	3 August 2017	64,000
14	6	"Riches in the Dry Well"	10 August 2017	78,000
15	7	"The Good, the Bad and the Ugly"	17 August 2017	75,000
16	8	"Isolation of the Bush"	24 August 2017	71,000
17	9	"Bush Mateship"	31 August 2017	69,000
18	10	"Extra Wands on the Ground"	7 September 2017	64,000

=== Season 3 (2018) ===
No. overall	No. in season	Title	Original release date	Australia viewers
19	1	"Episode 1"	31 May 2018	71,000
20	2	"Episode 2"	7 June 2018	61,000
21	3	"Episode 3"	14 June 2018	67,000
22	4	"Episode 4"	21 June 2018	75,000
23	5	"Episode 5"	28 June 2018	78,000
24	6	"Episode 6"	5 July 2018	67,000
25	7	"Episode 7"	12 July 2018	83,000
26	8	"Episode 8"	19 July 2018	75,000
27	9	"Episode 9"	26 July 2018	75,000
28	10	"Episode 10"	2 August 2018	81,000
29	11	"Episode 11"	9 August 2018	67,000
30	12	"Episode 12"	16 August 2018	67,000
31	13	"Episode 13"	23 August 2018	82,000

=== Season 4 (2019) ===
Aussie Gold Hunters season five episodes
No. overall	No. in season	Title	Original release date	Australia viewers
32	1	"Episode 1"	2 May 2019	64,000
33	2	"Episode 2"	9 May 2019	69,000
34	3	"Episode 3"	16 May 2019	91,000
35	4	"Episode 4"	23 May 2019	69,000
36	5	"Episode 5"	30 May 2019	72,000
37	6	"Episode 6"	6 June 2019	83,000
38	7	"Episode 7"	13 June 2019	75,000
39	8	"Episode 8"	20 June 2019	82,000
40	9	"Episode 9"	27 June 2019	66,000
41	10	"Episode 10"	4 July 2019	68,000
42	11	"Episode 11"	11 July 2019	92,000
43	12	"Episode 12"	18 July 2019	86,000
44	13	"Episode 13"	25 July 2019	113,000

=== Season 5 (2020) ===
No. overall	No. in season	Title	Original release date	Australia viewers
45	1	"Episode 1"	30 April 2020	106,000
46	2	"Episode 2"	7 May 2020	100,000
47	3	"Episode 3"	14 May 2020	105,000
48	4	"Episode 4"	21 May 2020	104,000
49	5	"Episode 5"	28 May 2020	88,000
50	6	"Episode 6"	4 June 2020	84,000
51	7	"Episode 7"	11 June 2020	70,000
52	8	"Episode 8"	18 June 2020	99,000
53	9	"Episode 9"	25 June 2020	86,000
54	10	"Episode 10"	2 July 2020	89,000
55	11	"Episode 11"	9 July 2020	89,000
56	12	"Episode 12"	16 July 2020	80,000
57	13	"Episode 13"	23 July 2020	81,000
58	14	"Episode 14"	30 July 2020	91,000
59	15	"Episode 15"	6 August 2020	84,000
60	16	"Episode 16"	13 August 2020	76,000
61	17	"Episode 17"	20 August 2020	81,000
62	18	"Episode 18"	27 August 2020	91,000
63	19	"Episode 19"	3 September 2020	82,000
64	20	"Episode 20"	10 September 2020	78,000

=== Specials ===
Aussie Gold Hunters specials
No. overall	No. in season	Title	Original release date	Australia viewers
65	1	"Countdown to the Motherload"	17 September 2020	54,000
66	2	"Surviving the Wilderness"	24 September 2020	38,000
67	3	"Gold Fever"	8 October 2020	58,000

=== Season 6 (2021) ===
Aussie Gold Hunters season six episodes
No. overall	No. in season	Title	Original release date	Australia viewers
68	1	"Episode 1"	29 April 2021	58,000
69	2	"Episode 2"	6 May 2021	52,000
70	3	"Episode 3"	13 May 2021	79,000
71	4	"Episode 4"	20 May 2021	71,000
72	5	"Episode 5"	27 May 2021	68,000
73	6	"Episode 6"	3 June 2021	71,000
74	7	"Episode 7"	10 June 2021	66,000
75	8	"Episode 8"	17 June 2021	62,000
76	9	"Episode 9"	24 June 2021	69,000
77	10	"Episode 10"	1 July 2021	64,000
78	11	"Episode 11"	8 July 2021	64,000
79	12	"Episode 12"	15 July 2021	59,000
80	13	"Episode 13"	22 July 2021	80,000
81	14	"Episode 14"	12 August 2021	60,000
82	15	"Episode 15"	19 August 2021	73,000
83	16	"Episode 16"	26 August 2021	79,000
84	17	"Episode 17"	2 September 2021	63,000
85	18	"Episode 18"	9 September 2021	55,000
86	19	"Episode 19"	16 September 2021	65,000
87	20	"Episode 20"	23 September 2021	66,000

=== Season 7 (2022) ===
Aussie Gold Hunters season seven episodes
No. overall	No. in season	Title	Original release date	Australia viewers
88	1	"Episode 1"	2 June 2022	49,000
Jacqui and Andrew encounter a crocodile as they camp on the banks of the Palmer River. Plus, the Ferals travel to Jarman Island to mine on untouched land.
89	2	"Episode 2"	9 June 2022	62,000
The Gold Retrievers chase off a late-night intruder. Shane and Russell venture out on a new expedition, while the Poseidon Crew make a big decision.
90	3	"Episode 3"	16 June 2022	40,000
A disastrous fire could ruin the Gold Timers’ season before it has even begun. The Ferals are forced to launch a rescue mission when Rob goes missing.
91	4	"Episode 4"	23 June 2022	57,000
Jacqui and Andrew are stranded in the dangerous tropical wilderness of the Palmer River region. Meanwhile, the Poseidon Crew face a critical meeting..
92	5	"Episode 5"	30 June 2022	54,000
Winter storms ravage the Gold Retrievers’ new $35,000 dry blower and could end their season. Meanwhile, the pressure to find gold could tear the Ferals apart.
93	6	"Episode 6"	7 July 2022	52,000
The Poseidon Crew are forced to hunt Victoria’s frozen high country. Meanwhile, the Gold Timers use the last of their savings to hire some big machinery.
94	7	"Episode 7"	14 July 2022	44,000
The Gold Timers gamble their last $6,000 and commission a magnetic drone survey. The Ferals face a killer snake, while Brad and Chris get expert advice.
95	8	"Episode 8"	21 July 2022	50,000
The `Dirt Dogs' gamble big to hit their tally, while Henri and Kellie mount a last-chance hunt for big nuggets. The `Gold Gypsies' pursue their goal.
96	9	"Episode 9"	28 July 2022	44,000
The Poseidon Crew take a gamble on gold ground they’ve already detected. Levi and Bridget make a rookie mistake, while the Gold Timers catch a thief.
97	10	"Episode 10"	4 August 2022	45,000
The Ferals confront a gold thief who’s raided their lease. The Gold Retrievers explore a promising new lease, while Jacqui and Andrew get their big break.
98	11	"Episode 11"	11 August 2022	46,000
Permit delays ruin the Poseidon Crew’s hopes of a massive payday on their famed ground. A torrential downpour forces Shane and Russell to evacuate their dig site.
99	12	"Episode 12"	18 August 2022	53,000
Jacqui and Andrew are targeted by potential gold thieves. Marcus and Linden hunt ground close to the site of the biggest nugget ever found in Western Australia.
100	13	"Episode 13"	25 August 2022	49,000
The Poseidon Crew finally start digging legendary ground in search of a multi-million-dollar nugget. Shane and Russell endure the snake-ridden wilderness in Pilbara.
101	14	"Episode 14"	1 September 2022	50,000
A robbery at the Gold Retrievers’ camp puts more pressure on Chris and Brad’s partnership. Marcus and Linden finally hit a rich patch of nuggets.
102	15	"Episode 15"	8 September 2022	57,000
Jacqui and Andrew feel the pressure as they battle hard rock ground that could ruin their latest deal. Plus, Shane and Russell search an ancient mine.
103	16	"Episode 16"	15 September 2022	48,000
The Poseidon Crew are running out of time to find a 1,000-ounce nugget. The Gold Retrievers work through the night in an attempt to escape dangerous summer heat.
104	17	"Episode 17"	22 September 2022	50,000
Shane and Russell take the biggest gamble of their season. Marcus, Linden and Dale desperately need new ground before intense heat shuts down their operation.
105	18	"Episode 18"	29 September 2022	43,000
The Gold Timers negotiate a lucrative deal to sell their mining rights. Torrential summer storms in Victoria threaten to shut down the Poseidon Crew’s operation.
106	19	"Episode 19"	6 October 2022	54,000
In the Pilbara region, the Ferals hit a run of nuggets that could transform their season. Meanwhile, the Gold Retrievers are rocked by a medical emergency.
107	20	"Episode 20"	13 October 2022	56,000
The Poseidon Crew’s mine site is swamped after a brutal storm. Ryan collapses in a deadly heatwave, while Russell and Shane uncover a big nugget.

== Parker's Trail crossover ==
In 2020, season four of Gold Rush: Parker's Trail featured gold mining in the states of Victoria, Queensland, and Western Australia. The season saw former Aussie Gold Hunters cast member Tyler Mahoney in a main role. There were also guest appearances by former cast members Jake Larsen demonstrating heap leaching, as well as Ted and Lecky Mahoney teaching the process of pegging land leases.

== Reception ==
The series has been a domestic and international ratings success. The series was the #1 factual program on Foxtel for four consecutive years from 2017 to 2020. In addition, in the United Kingdom, where the series is broadcast on Quest, Aussie Gold Hunters is consistently the channel's top rating show of the week, and frequently ranks in the top 10 of non-public broadcasting shows.

== Broadcast ==
As of May 2020, Aussie Gold Hunters has been broadcast in 125 countries with an estimated reach of 40 million viewers.

== See also ==
- Gold Rush, a similar show set in Canada and Alaska
- Yukon Gold, a similar show set in Canada
