= Gold prospecting =

Act of searching for new gold deposits

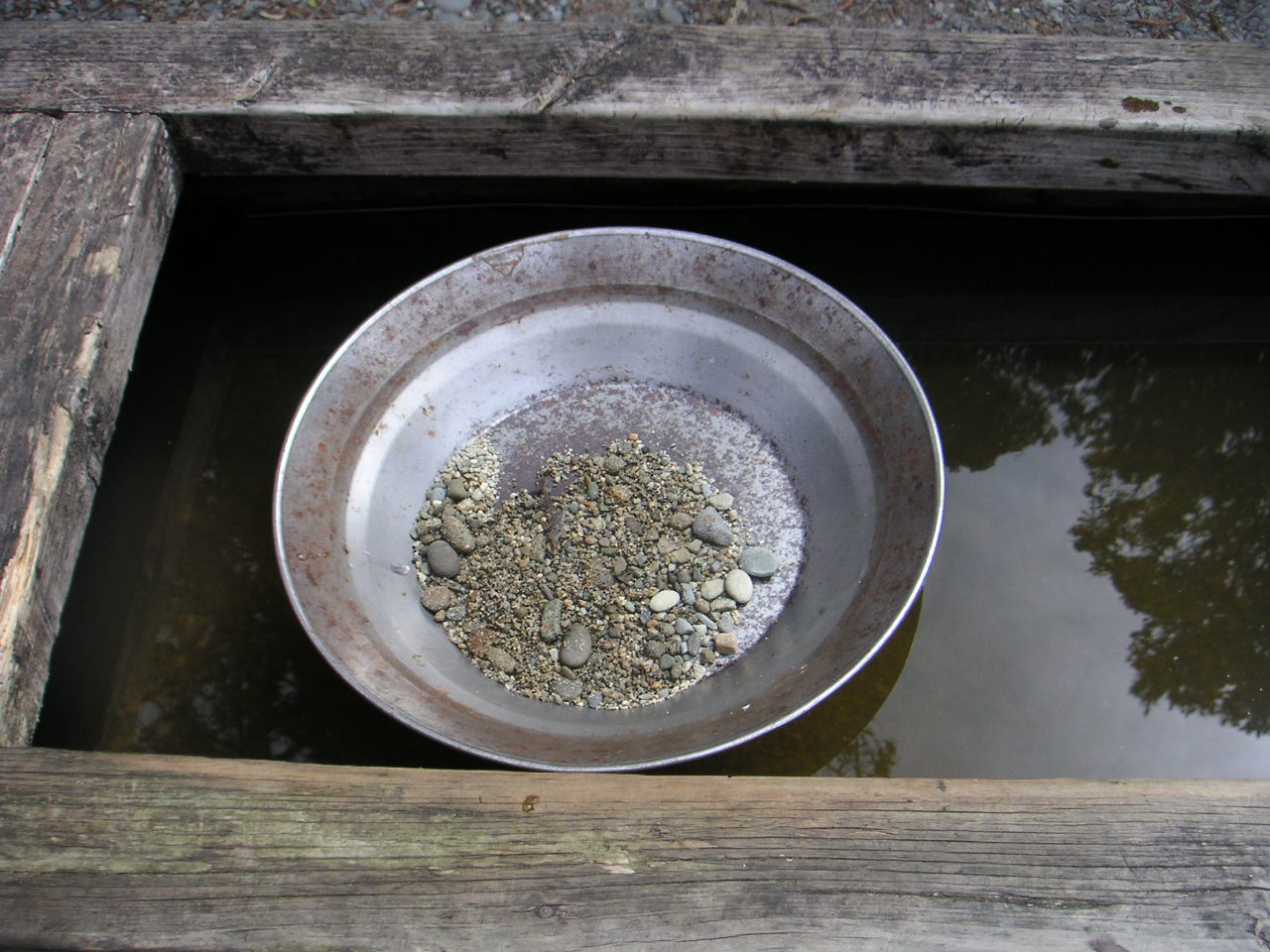
A gold pan

Gold prospecting is the act of searching for new gold deposits. Methods used vary with the type of deposit sought and the resources of the prospector. Although traditionally a commercial activity, in some developed countries placer gold prospecting has also become a popular outdoor recreation. Gold prospecting has been popular since antiquity. From the earliest textual and archaeological references, gold prospecting was a common thread for gaining wealth.

== Prospecting for placer gold ==
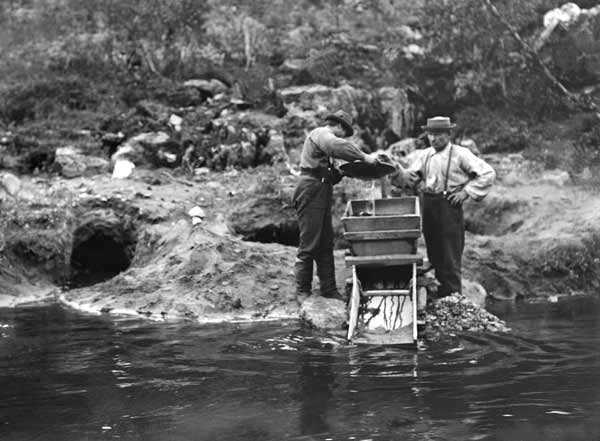
Gold prospecting at the Ivalo River in 1898

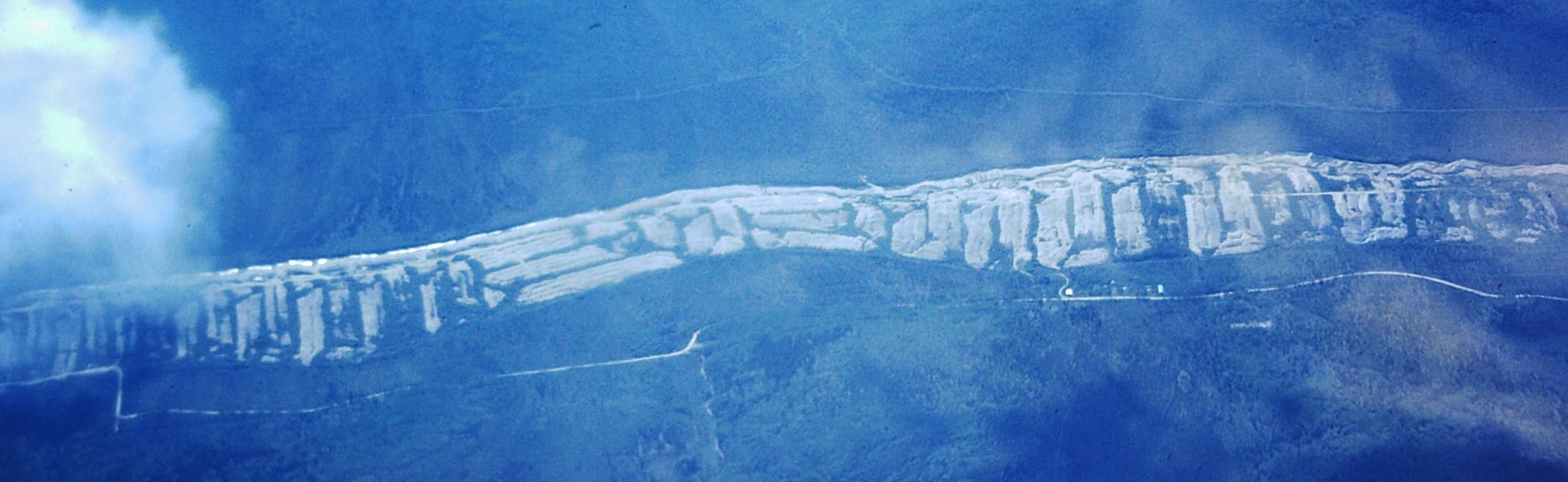
Gold rush traces at river in Alaska. Here, placer gold has been industrially extracted by sluices and mechanical devices. Great volumes of material have been washed along this river, the traces can still been seen on this aerial image,

Prospecting for placer gold is normally done with a gold pan or similar instrument to wash free gold particles from loose surface sediment. The use of gold pans is centuries old, but is still common among prospectors and miners with little financial backing.

Deeper placer deposits may be sampled by trenching or drilling. Geophysical methods such as seismic, gravity or magnetics may be used to locate buried river channels that are likely locations for placer gold. Sampling and assaying a placer gold deposit to determine its economic viability is subject to many pitfalls.

Once placer gold is discovered, the gold pan is usually replaced by sluices or mechanical devices to wash greater volumes of material. Discovery of placer gold has often resulted in discovery of hardrock gold deposits when the placers are traced to their sources.

== Prospecting for hardrock gold deposits ==
Prospectors for hardrock, or lode gold deposits, can use many tools. It is done at the simplest level by surface examination of rock outcrops, looking for exposures of mineral veins, hydrothermal alteration, or rock types known to host gold deposits. Field tools may be nothing more than a rock hammer and hand lens.

Hardrock gold deposits are more varied in mineralogy and geology than placer deposits, and prospecting methods can be very different for different types of deposits. As with placer gold, the sophistication of methods used to prospect for hardrock gold vary with the financial resources of the prospector. Drilling is often used to explore the subsurface. Surface geophysical methods may be used to locate geophysical anomalies associated with gold deposits. Samples of rocks or soil may be collected for geochemical laboratory assay, to determine metal content or detect geochemical anomalies. Hardrock gold particles may be too small to see, even with a microscope.

Most gold today is produced in large open-pit and deep underground mines. However, small-scale gold mining is still common, especially in developing countries.

A 2012 study by Australian scientists found that termites have been found to excrete trace deposits of gold. According to the CSIRO, the termites burrow beneath eroded subterranean material which typically masks human attempts to find gold, and ingest and bring the new deposits to the surface. They believe that studying termite nests may lead to less invasive methods of finding gold deposits. Herodotus reported about gold-digging ants.

== Recreational prospecting ==
Small-scale recreational prospecting for placer gold has been seen in many parts of the world including New Zealand (especially in Otago), Australia, South Africa, Wales (at Dolaucothi and in Gwynedd), in Canada and in the United States especially in western states but also elsewhere.

== Gallery ==
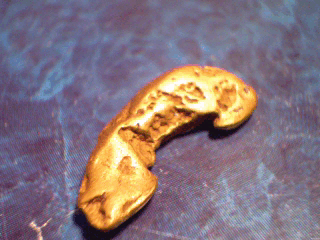
A gold nugget from the Blue Ribbon Mine in Alaska

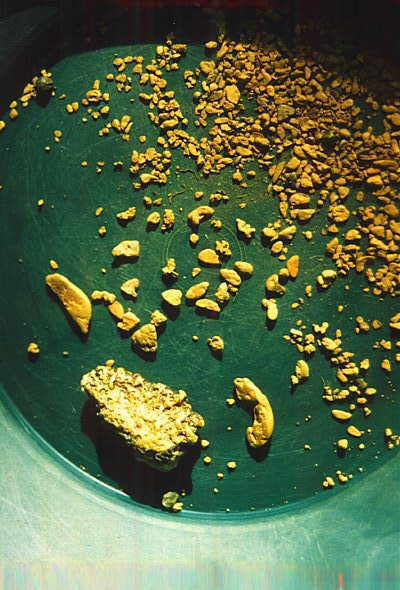
Gold nuggets in a pan also from the Blue Ribbon Mine in Alaska

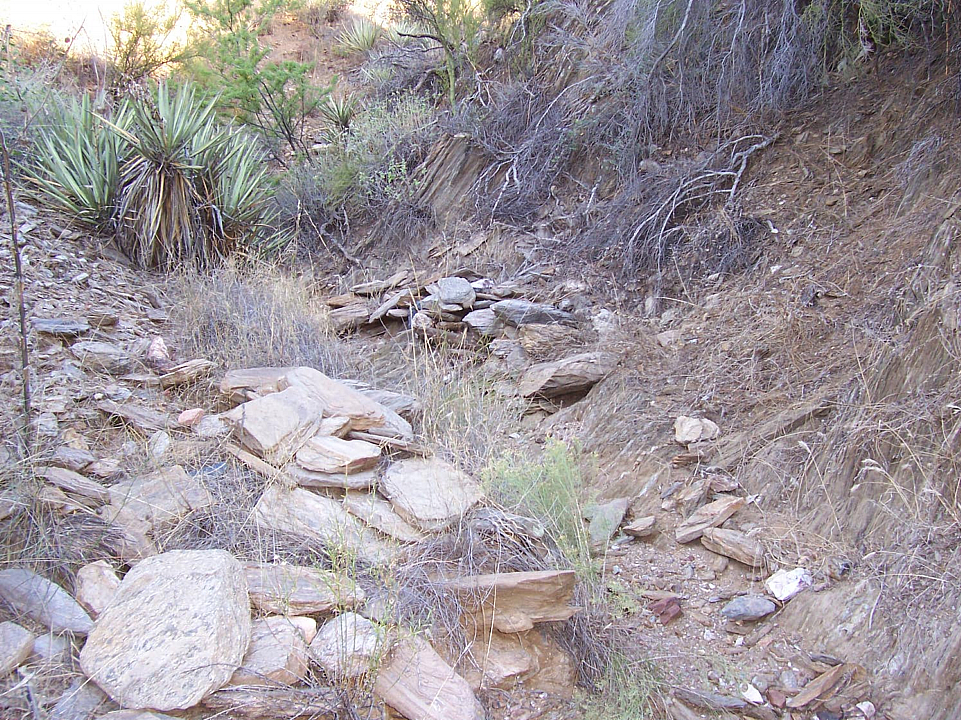
Old workings in a drywash in southern Arizona

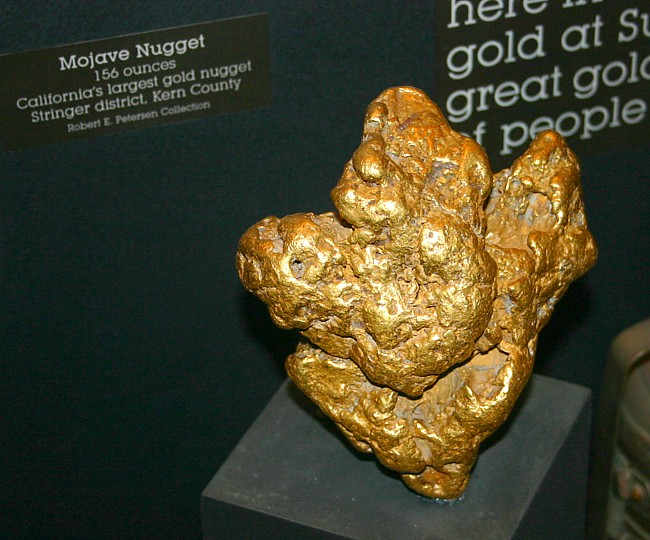
Using a metal detector in a Southern California desert, an individual prospector found this gold nugget, known as the Mojave Nugget, weighing 156 troy ounces (4.9 kg).

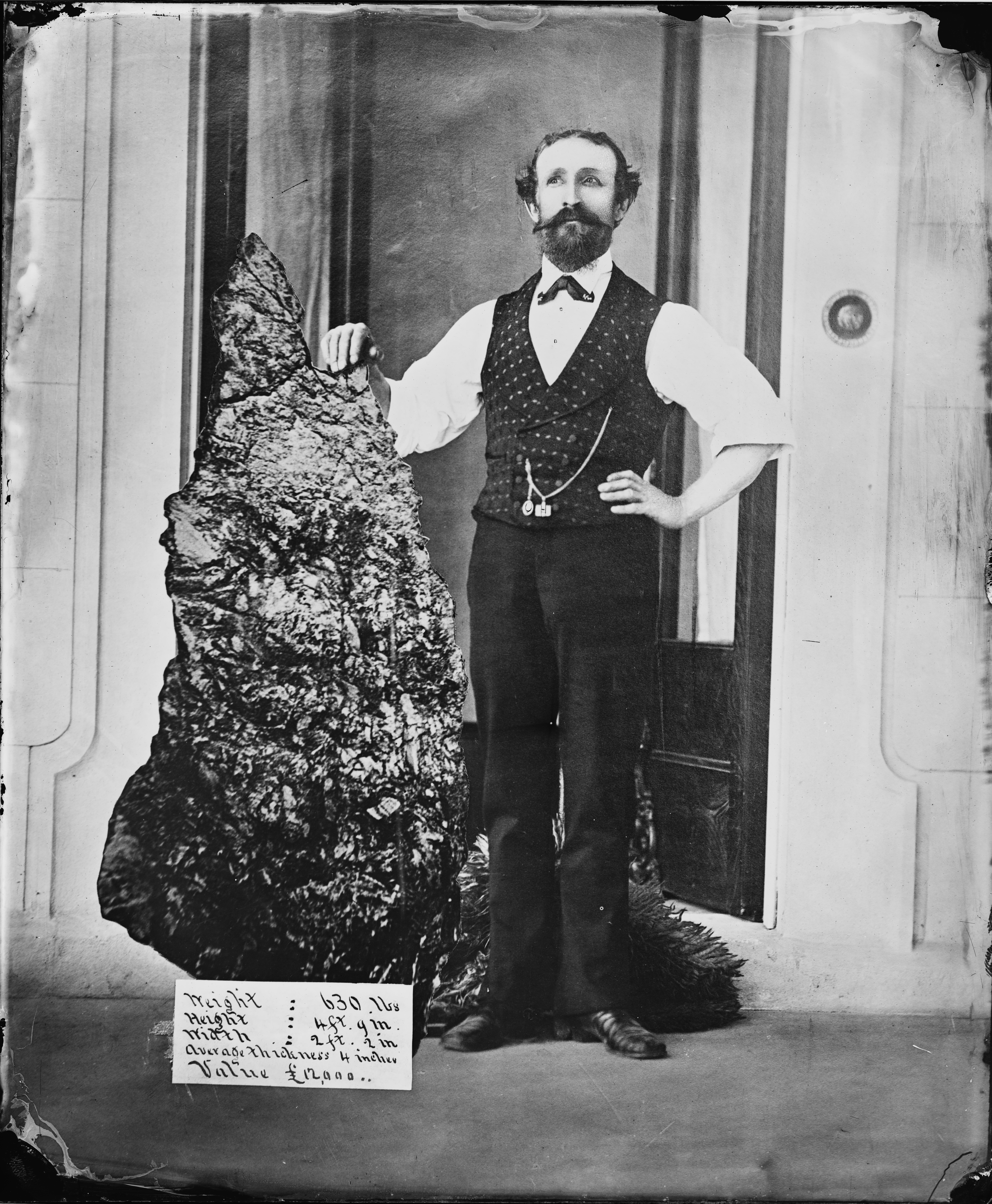
Bernhardt Holtermann and the gold specimen "Holtermann Nugget" discovered at Star of Hope Mine in 1872

== See also ==
- Gold mining in Alaska
- Gold in California
- Gold nugget
- Gold panning
- Gold Prospectors Association of America
- Gold rush
- Hushing
- Mineral exploration
- Placer mining
- Recreational gold mining
