= List of waterscapes by Frank Weston Benson =

Frank Weston Benson made Waterscapes in oil, watercolor, ink, pencil and created etchings. He also made portraits, landscapes, wildlife, interiors and other works of art.

Salem Harbor was Benson's first etching, made while he was at the School of the Museum of Fine Arts, Boston and published in the school's magazine Students in the School of Drawing. Benson was one of the editors of the magazine. Thirty years later, in 1912, Benson began etching again, a practice that thereafter became a major body of his work. Two plates were made of The Anchorage that depicted a fisherman bringing a dory to shore. The first resulted in 48 proofs on shogun paper, 43 of which were signed. The second plate was more spacious than the first and resulted in 25 signed proofs printed on shogun paper. The work was exhibited in 1915 and 1916 four times. Casting for Salmon is one of Benson's 359 etchings, most of which were made of waterfowl. In the simple composition of a fisherman reflected influence by Japanese artists and demonstrated his skill as an etcher.

Benson declared Calm Morning of his three oldest children his "best out of door work." In this case Benson was deliberate in his approach, he made three oil studies before making the final painting; Generally he started and finished he outdoor paintings on one canvas. From left to right, Eleanor, Elisabeth and George fished over the side of a boat off in the waters of their summer home in Maine. Benson was masterful in capturing the reflection of the boat on the water and the deeper color of its shadow. The vivid, luminous colors give depict the sun shining upon the children.

Over Benson's career he painted more than 600 watercolors, like Camp (or Salmon Fishing) that he made during a salmon fishing trip in Canada with his son, George.

== Waterscapes ==
Title	Image	Medium	Year	data-sort-type="number"|Dimensions	Collection	Comments and SIRIS Number (Note: The SIRIS IAP is the Control Number for a given painting at the Smithsonian Institution Research Information System. Using the link, you may look up the painting using the IAP number for the "Control number".)
Salem Harbor		etching/print	1882	5.1 in x 7.9 in (13 cm x 20.1 cm)		
After the Storm		oil on canvas	1884	40 in x 58 in (101.6 cm x 147.3 cm)	Peabody Essex Museum, Salem, MA	Scene: woman at seashore; Concarneau, France. After the Storm was selected to be exhibited at London's Royal Academy in the spring of 1885. SIRIS Collection Number 89170007
Moonlight (or Moonlight on the Waters)		oil on canvas	1891	15 in x 30 in (38.1 cm x 76.2 cm)	Art Institute of Chicago	Scene: nighttime waterscape with full moon reflecting off crashing white waves. SIRIS Collection Number 89170035
The Concord River		oil on canvas	1893	30 in x 25 in (76.2 cm x 63.5 cm)		
Portsmouth Harbor		oil on canvas	1895	24 in x 20 in (61 cm x 50.8 cm)		Scene: Portsmouth, NH. SIRIS Collection Number 8C110002
Calm Morning		oil on canvas	1904	44.4 in x 36.1 in (112.8 cm x 91.7 cm)	Museum of Fine Arts, Boston, Boston, MA; Akron Art Museum, Akron, Ohio	SIRIS Collection Number 20492457
The Landing (or Annisquam Yacht Club)		oil on canvas	1904	25 in x 30 in (63.5 cm x 76.2 cm)	Cincinnati Art Museum, Cincinnati, OH	Scene: sunny late afternoon view across deep blue water along coast of North Haven, ME. SIRIS Collection Number 40800235
Smelt Fishermen		etching on zinc plate/print	1913		Cleveland Museum of Art, Cleveland, OH	
Sunset		drypoint etching on copper plate/print	1914	9.1 in x 7.1 in (23.1 cm x 18 cm)	Cleveland Museum of Art, Cleveland, OH; Herbert F. Johnson Museum of Art, Cornell University, Ithaca, NY	
The Duck Hunter		etching on wove paper/print	1914	5.9 in x 7.9 in (15 cm x 20.1 cm)	Museum of Fine Arts, Boston, Boston, MA	
River Drivers (or River Drifters)		etching/print	1914	8.9 in x 6.9 in (22.6 cm x 17.5 cm)	California Palace of the Legion of Honor, San Francisco, CA; Mead Art Museum, Amherst College, Amherst, MA	
Clam Digger		etching/print	1914	5.9 in x 7.9 in (15 cm x 20.1 cm)		
Dusk		etching/print	1914	9.8 in x 10.9 in (24.9 cm x 27.7 cm)		Scene: waterfowl hunter wading through marsh.
Hunter in a Boat (or Hunter in Boat)		oil on canvas	1915	33.3 in x 66.5 in (84.6 cm x 168.9 cm)	Museum of Fine Arts, Boston, Boston, MA	Scene: male figure sits in rowboat on rough water as waterfowl fly overhead. SIRIS Collection Number 20492454
The Anchorage		etching/print	1915	3.8 in x 6.8 in (9.7 cm x 17.3 cm)	Museum of Art, University of New Hampshire, Durham, NH; Museum of Fine Arts, Boston, Boston, MA	
The Landing		etching/print	1915	7.3 in x 11.2 in (18.5 cm x 28.4 cm)	Museum of Fine Arts, Boston, Boston, MA	
Low Tide		drypoint etching/print	1915		Museum of Fine Arts, Boston, Boston, MA	
The Fishermen		etching on Shogun paper/print	1915	8 in x 6 in (20.3 cm x 15.2 cm)	Museum of Fine Arts, Boston, Boston, MA; Mead Art Museum, Amherst College, Amherst, MA	Scene: children fishing from a small boat.
The Lobsterman (or The Lobster Man)		etching/print	1915	10 in x 8 in (25.4 cm x 20.3 cm)	Museum of Fine Arts, Boston, Boston, MA; Herbert F. Johnson Museum of Art, Cornell University, Ithaca, NY	Scene: male figure standing at oars in boat in waterscape.
The Gunner		etching/print	1915	9.8 in x 7.9 in (24.9 cm x 20.1 cm) or 14.5 in x 11.5 in (36.8 cm x 29.2 cm)	Museum of Fine Arts, Boston, Boston, MA; Herbert F. Johnson Museum of Art, Cornell University, Ithaca, NY; Akron Art Museum, Akron, Ohio	Scene: waterfowl hunter in waterscape.
Over Sunk Marsh		pencil	1915	5.9 in x 7.9 in (15 cm x 20.1 cm)		
Fox Islands Thoroughfare, Maine	Online image	watercolor on paper	c. 1916	14.5 in x 21.5 in (36.8 cm x 54.6 cm)		Scene: view of Fox Island Thoroughfare (part of Atlantic Ocean between two Maine islands) over yellow landscape with pine trees. SIRIS Collection Number 73750008
In the Marsh (or Duck Hunting)	Online image	watercolor	1916	14 in x 20 in (35.6 cm x 50.8 cm)		Scene: wildfowl hunter standing in boat in marsh.
Fishing	Online image	ink, wash, and pencil en grisaille on paper	1916	9.8 in x 11.8 in (24.9 cm x 30 cm)		Scene: male figures fishing, wading or in canoe.
Evening		etching/print	1916	10 in x 7.9 in (25.4 cm x 20.1 cm)	Museum of Fine Arts, Boston, Boston, MA; Herbert F. Johnson Museum of Art, Cornell University, Ithaca, NY	Scene: marsh waterscape with lone waterfowl.
Portsmouth Harbour (or Portsmouth Harbor)		etching/print	1916	7.3 in x 6 in (18.5 cm x 15.2 cm)	Museum of Fine Arts, Boston, Boston, MA; Herbert F. Johnson Museum of Art, Cornell University, Ithaca, NY	Scene: Portsmouth, NH.
The River		drypoint etching/print	1916	9.9 in x 7.9 in (25.1 cm x 20.1 cm)	Museum of Fine Arts, Boston, Boston, MA; Herbert F. Johnson Museum of Art, Cornell University, Ithaca, NY	Scene: river waterscape with waterfowl.
Trout Stream		etching/print	1916		Museum of Fine Arts, Boston, Boston, MA	
On the Ipswich River		etching/print	1916		Museum of Fine Arts, Boston, Boston, MA	Scene: Ipswich River, MA.
Second Island Outlet		drypoint etching/print	1916	8.8 in x 13.8 in (22.4 cm x 35.1 cm)	Museum of Fine Arts, Boston, Boston, MA; Herbert F. Johnson Museum of Art, Cornell University, Ithaca, NY	
Marshes at Long Point (or Marshes of Long Point)	Cornell Online collection	drypoint etching/print	1916	8.8 in x 13.8 in (22.4 cm x 35.1 cm)	Museum of Fine Arts, Boston, Boston, MA; Herbert F. Johnson Museum of Art, Cornell University, Ithaca, NY	
Marshes at Evening	Online image	etching/print	1918	8.7 in x 10.6 in (22.1 cm x 26.9 cm)	Museum of Fine Arts, Boston, Boston, MA	Scene: waterfowl in flight in marsh.
Bound Home	Online image	etching/print	1918	9 in x 10.9 in (22.9 cm x 27.7 cm) or 6 in x 8 in (15.2 cm x 20.3 cm)	National Academy Museum and School	Scene: male figures (2) in sailboat.
Marsh Gunner		etching/print	1918	11 in x 9.1 in (27.9 cm x 23.1 cm)	Museum of Fine Arts, Boston, Boston, MA	Scene: waterfowl hunter in waterscape.
Canoeman		etching on laid paper/print	1919	8 in x 6 in (20.3 cm x 15.2 cm)	Indianapolis Museum of Art, Indianapolis, IN; Museum of Fine Arts, Boston, Boston, MA	
Boating at Vinalhaven			1920	30 in x 23.3 in (76.2 cm x 59.2 cm)	Private collection	Scene: Vinalhaven, ME.
Boats at Dawn		etching on zinc plate/print	1920	7.7 in x 10.7 in (19.6 cm x 27.2 cm)	Achenbach Foundation for Graphic Arts, California Palace of the Legion of Honor, San Francisco, CA; Museum of Fine Arts, Boston, Boston, MA; Art Institute of Chicago, Chicago, IL; Herbert F. Johnson Museum of Art, Cornell University, Ithaca, NY	Scene: small boats setting off from dock.
Rippling Water		etching on zinc plate/print	1920	12.6 in x 9.8 in (32 cm x 24.9 cm) or 10 in x 8 in (25.4 cm x 20.3 cm)	Museum of Fine Arts, Boston, Boston, MA; Herbert F. Johnson Museum of Art, Cornell University, Ithaca, NY	Scene: lone waterfowl in waterscape.
Canada River	Online image	drypoint etching/print	1920	5.9 in x 7.9 in (15 cm x 20.1 cm)	Cleveland Museum of Art, Cleveland, OH; Museum of Fine Arts, Boston, Boston, MA	
Riverman	Cornell Online collection	etching/aquatint on wove paper/print	1920	6 in x 4 in (15.2 cm x 10.2 cm)	Museum of Fine Arts, Boston, Boston, MA; Herbert F. Johnson Museum of Art, Cornell University, Ithaca, NY	Scene: male figure poling canoe in waterscape.
Rivermen		etching/print	1920	7 in x 9 in (17.8 cm x 22.9 cm)	Herbert F. Johnson Museum of Art, Cornell University, Ithaca, NY	Scene: male figures (2) poling canoe in waterscape.
Sunrise		etching on Japanese wove paper/print	1920	6.9 in x 10.8 in (17.5 cm x 27.4 cm)	Museum of Fine Arts, Boston, Boston, MA: Herbert F. Johnson Museum of Art, Cornell University, Ithaca, NY	
Early Gunners		etching/print	1920	1.8 in x 5 in (4.6 cm x 12.7 cm)	Museum of Fine Arts, Boston, Boston, MA; Herbert F. Johnson Museum of Art, Cornell University, Ithaca, NY	Scene: 2 figures standing in boats in waterscape.
Winding River		etching/print	1920	5.8 in x 3.8 in (14.7 cm x 9.7 cm)		
Harbor		etching/print	c. 1920	4 in x 6 in (10.2 cm x 15.2 cm)	Museum of Fine Arts, Boston, Boston, MA; Herbert F. Johnson Museum of Art, Cornell University, Ithaca, NY	
Camp (or Salmon fishing)			1921			
Wood Duck Pond	Online image	watercolor on paper	1921	19.5 in x 15.5 in (49.5 cm x 39.4 cm)		Scene: close-up of pond with woods/brush in background. SIRIS Collection Number 9170022
Rocky River	Online image	etching/print	1921		Cleveland Museum of Art, Cleveland, OH; Museum of Fine Arts, Boston, Boston, MA	
Off Pea Island	Online image	etching/print	1921	7 in x 10 in (17.8 cm x 25.4 cm)	Cleveland Museum of Art, Cleveland, OH; Museum of Fine Arts, Boston, Boston, MA; Herbert F. Johnson Museum of Art, Cornell University, Ithaca, NY	Scene: small boats at anchor in waterscape.
The Gunners' Blind (or Gunner's Blind)		etching on Japanese wove paper/print	1921	8 in x 9.8 in (20.3 cm x 24.9 cm)	Museum of Fine Arts, Boston, Boston, MA; Herbert F. Johnson Museum of Art, Cornell University, Ithaca, NY	
The Gunners Blind	Online image	etching/print	1921	8 in x 9.8 in (20.3 cm x 24.9 cm)	Museum of Fine Arts, Boston, Boston, MA	
Essex Marshes	Online image	etching/print	c. 1921	6.9 in x 11.8 in (17.5 cm x 30 cm)		
The Sarah Douglass	Online image	watercolor on paper	1922	19.5 in x 15.3 in (49.5 cm x 38.9 cm)		Scene: sailboat in dry dock by water. SIRIS Collection Number 89170095
Danvers River, Massachusetts	Online image	watercolor on paper	1922	13.8 in x 19.7 in (35.1 cm x 50 cm)	Museum of Fine Arts, Boston, Boston, MA	Scene: snow-covered winter landscape with Danvers River winding across foreground. SIRIS Collection Number 20493113
Western Bay	Online image	watercolor on paper	1922	14 in x 22 in (35.6 cm x 55.9 cm)		
Beach Looking West	Online image	watercolor/pencil on paper laid down on board	1922	13.5 in x 19.5 in (34.3 cm x 49.5 cm)		Scene: beach landscape with view of sea through sea grape trees.
The Thoroughfare	Online image	watercolor on paper	1922	13.8 in x 19.5 in (35.1 cm x 49.5 cm)		Scene: view of Fox Island Thoroughfare (part of Atlantic Ocean between two Maine islands) over yellow landscape with pine trees.
The Bowsprit	Online image	watercolor over graphite pencil on paper	c. 1922	16.1 in x 20.2 in (40.9 cm x 51.3 cm)	Museum of Fine Arts, Boston, Boston, MA	
Pulpit Rock, North Haven, Maine	Online image	watercolor on paper	1922	14.3 in x 20 in (36.3 cm x 50.8 cm)		
The Start	Online image	etching on laid paper/print	1922	5 in x 3.8 in (12.7 cm x 9.7 cm)	Indianapolis Museum of Art, Indianapolis, IN; Museum of Fine Arts, Boston, Boston, MA; Art Institute of Chicago, Chicago, IL	Scene: waterfowl hunters setting out.
Lily Pond	Online image	oil on canvas	1923	44 in x 36 in (111.8 cm x 91.4 cm)		Scene: view looking across lily pond behind artist's home, Wooster Farm, North Haven, Maine; deep green lily pads scattered across water with sun highlighting grass along far shore. SIRIS Collection Number 89170088
Down the Rapids	Online image	watercolor/pencil on paper	c. 1923	16.5 in x 20 in (41.9 cm x 50.8 cm)		Scene: 2 figures navigate river rapids in canoe.
Canoe Voyage	Online image	watercolor on paper	1923	16 in x 20 in (40.6 cm x 50.8 cm)		Scene: two figures canoeing on calm river.
Wildfowler (or Wild Fowler)	Cornell Online collection	etching/print	1923	20 in x 12 in (50.8 cm x 30.5 cm) or 7.8 in x 11.8 in (19.8 cm x 30 cm)	Museum of Fine Arts, Boston, Boston, MA; Herbert F. Johnson Museum of Art, Cornell University, Ithaca, NY	
Setting Decoys	Cornell Online collection	etching on laid paper/print	c. 1923	7.9 in x 11 in (20.1 cm x 27.9 cm)	Museum of Fine Arts, Boston, Boston, MA; Herbert F. Johnson Museum of Art, Cornell University, Ithaca, NY	
On the Kedgwick (or On the Kedgewick)	Cornell Online collection	etching/print	1923	7.8 in x 11.8 in (19.8 cm x 30 cm)	Museum of Fine Arts, Boston, Boston, MA; Herbert F. Johnson Museum of Art, Cornell University, Ithaca, NY	Scene: 2 figures with canoes at sandy river landing.
Salmon Fishermen	Online image	watercolor and graphite on wove paper	1924	20.9 in x 17.8 in (53.1 cm x 45.2 cm)	Addison Gallery of American Art, Phillips Academy, Andover, MA	Scene: 2 male figures on river in canoe; 1 fishing, one paddling.
Lily Pond		watercolor on paper	1924	14 in x 20.8 in (35.6 cm x 52.8 cm)		Scene: close-up of still pond water with lily pads. SIRIS Control Number 89170101
Deer River, Alabama	Online image	watercolor on paper	c. 1924	13.3 in x 20.3 in (33.8 cm x 51.6 cm)		
Boat with Dog (or Hunter Poling Boat)		etching/lithograph	1924	27.9 in x 35.6 in (70.9 cm x 90.4 cm) or 11.3 in x 14.5 in (28.7 cm x 36.8 cm)	Private collection	SIRIS Collection Number 89170054
The Deer Hunter	Online image	etching on wove paper/print	1924	6.7 in x 10.7 in (17 cm x 27.2 cm)	Museum of Fine Arts, Boston, Boston, MA	
Fire on the Beach	Online image	oil on canvas	1925	30 in x 36 in (76.2 cm x 91.4 cm)		SIRIS Collection Number 89170041
The Stream	Online image	watercolor on paper	1925	18 in x 21.9 in (45.7 cm x 55.6 cm)	Cleveland Museum of Art, Cleveland, OH	Scene: male figure standing in stream fishing.
Hunter Coming Ashore	Online image	watercolor	1925	16.5 in x 21.5 in (41.9 cm x 54.6 cm)		Scene: lone hunter in marsh pulling boat ashore.
Duck Blind (or Duck Hunters)		etching/print	1925	7.9 in x 10.9 in (20.1 cm x 27.7 cm) or 18.4 in x 25.4 in (46.7 cm x 64.5 cm)	Museum of Fine Arts, Boston, Boston, MA; Herbert F. Johnson Museum of Art, Cornell University, Ithaca, NY; Akron Art Museum, Akron, Ohio	
Over Currituck Marshes		watercolor on paper	1926	14.5 in x 19.3 in (36.8 cm x 49 cm)		Scene: man wades in water with his right hand on boat; dog sits in boat; ducks float on water at left. SIRIS Collection Number 8A220003
Hunter with Retriever	Online image	watercolor on paper	1926	15 in x 20 in (38.1 cm x 50.8 cm)		
The Gorge in Autumn	Online image	watercolor with graphite on paper	1926	15.5 in x 13.8 in (39.4 cm x 35.1 cm)		Art work is dedicated to Horace Dunham.
Early Morning Sail	Online image	watercolor on paper	1926	18.8 in x 24.8 in (47.8 cm x 63 cm)		Scene: lone figure in small sailboat in waterscape.
The Punter	Online image	watercolor on paper	1926	14.5 in x 18.5 in (36.8 cm x 47 cm)		Scene: lone figure standing, poling a small boat in waterscape.
Canoeing	Online image	watercolor/pencil on paper laid on board	1926	21.7 in x 15.1 in (55.1 cm x 38.4 cm)		Scene: figures standing, poling canoes in waterscape.
Salmon Fishing	Online image	oil on canvas	1927	36.1 in x 44.1 in (91.7 cm x 112 cm)	Museum of Fine Arts, Boston, Boston, MA	Scene: man standing under shade of tree in shallow water along shore of river, his pant legs rolled up and fishing pole in his hands; man stares intently across water as salmon jumps above surface; mountains visible in distance. SIRIS Collection Number 20492452
Salmon Fishing	Online image	oil on canvas	1927	32 in x 40 in (81.3 cm x 101.6 cm)		Scene: two figures fishing on a river from a canoe.
Indian Guide	Online image	oil on canvas	1927	40 in x 32 in (101.6 cm x 81.3 cm)	Private collection	
On the Restigouche	Online image	oil on canvas	1927	36 in x 44 in (91.4 cm x 111.8 cm)	Art Institute of Chicago, Chicago, IL	Scene: male figure standing in canoe poling on choppy river. SIRIS Collection Number 12000025
Resting on the Kedgwick	Online image	watercolor	1927	19 in x 24 in (48.3 cm x 61 cm)		Scene: male figure sits beside canoe at sandy river landing.
Winter Wildfowling	Online image	etching	1927	11.8 in x 9.8 in (30 cm x 24.9 cm)	Metropolitan Museum of Art, New York, NY	Scene: waterfowl hunters in waterscape.
The Punter	Online image	etching on laid paper/print	1927	11.8 in x 15.8 in (30 cm x 40.1 cm) or 7.8 in x 11.9 in (19.8 cm x 30.2 cm)	Cleveland Museum of Art, Cleveland, OH; Metropolitan Museum of Art, New York, NY; Memorial Art Gallery, University of Rochester, Rochester, NY; Currier Museum of Art, Manchester, NH	Scene: male figure standing in punt in waterscape.
Running the Rapids	Online image	etching on laid paper/print	1927	8.3 in x 10.5 in (21.1 cm x 26.7 cm) or 5.8 in x 7.8 in (14.7 cm x 19.8 cm)	Frye Art Museum, Seattle, WA	
Vinalhaven, Maine	Online image	watercolor on paper	1927	15 in x 21.5 in (38.1 cm x 54.6 cm)		Scene: Vinalhaven, ME.
Dory Fisherman	Online image	etching/print	c. 1927	7.8 in x 9.8 in (19.8 cm x 24.9 cm)	Westmoreland Museum of American Art, Greensburg, PA	Scene: male figure at rudder of dory.
Two Canoes	Online image	etching on laid paper/print	c. 1927	9.3 in x 11.5 in (23.6 cm x 29.2 cm) or 6 in x 7.8 in (15.2 cm x 19.8 cm)	Georgia Museum of Art, Athens, GA	Scene: male figures in 2 canoes on quiet water.
Lower Camp Pool	Online image	oil on canvas	1928	32 in x 40 in (81.3 cm x 101.6 cm)		Scene: view looking across wide sandy shore along river; male figure casts fishing line into water; another male figure removes supplies from canoe pulled up on shore. SIRIS Collection Number 9E290011
A Pool on the York	Online image	watercolor on paper	1928	19.3 in x 24.3 in (49 cm x 61.7 cm)		Scene: 2 men are in boat on York River; one man stands with pole in water; the other sits holding fishing pole. SIRIS Collection Number 89170036
Spear Fishing	Online image	watercolor	1928	24 in x 20 in (61 cm x 50.8 cm)		
Hassayampa River, Arizona		watercolor on paper	1928	14 in x 20.9 in (35.6 cm x 53.1 cm)		SIRIS Collection Number 8A220024
River in Flood	Online image	watercolor/graphite on board	1928	21 in x 26.5 in (53.3 cm x 67.3 cm) or 18.3 in x 26 in (46.5 cm x 66 cm)	Addison Gallery of American Art, Phillips Academy, Andover, MA	Scene: male figures with canoe on raging river. SIRIS Collection Number 20110006
Grand Rivers: Rapids	Online image	transparent and opaque watercolor	1929	20.1 in x 25.2 in (51.1 cm x 64 cm)	Museum of Fine Arts, Boston, Boston, MA	SIRIS Collection Number 89170042
Casting for Salmon		etching on laid paper	1929	7.8 in x 10 in (19.8 cm x 25.4 cm)		
Twilight	Online image	oil on canvas	1930	40 in x 50 in (101.6 cm x 127 cm)		Scene: at left, male figure stands in boat on river at twilight; figure holds oar out of water; hills with trees are at right. SIRIS Collection Number 8A220002
The Shadow	Online image	oil on canvas laid down on masonite	1930	27.5 in x 34.5 in (69.9 cm x 87.6 cm)		Scene: male figure standing and fishing in a canoe on river. SIRIS Collection Number 62642703
On Grand River			c. 1930	36 in x 44 in (91.4 cm x 111.8 cm)		Scene: in middle of Grand River, male figure stands in rowboat, in his hands long pole which he uses to punt down river. SIRIS Collection Number 89170094
Dog River, Alabama	Online image	watercolor on paper	1930	14.5 in x 22.5 in (36.8 cm x 57.2 cm)		Scene: Dog River.
Two Gunners	Online image	etching/print	1930	7 in x 11.8 in (17.8 cm x 30 cm)		Scene: 2 male figures in boats in waterscape.
Dawn on the York	Online image	oil on canvas laid down on masonite	1931	48 in x 54 in (121.9 cm x 137.2 cm) or 40 in x 50 in (101.6 cm x 127 cm)		SIRIS Collection Number 89170052
Lower Reservoir, Tihonet	Online image	watercolor on paper	1933	18.5 in x 24.4 in (47 cm x 62 cm)	Museum of Fine Arts, Boston, Boston, MA	Scene: reservoir at Tihonet seen through grove of slender trees growing along near bank. SIRIS Collection Number 20493117
Duck Hunting	Online image	oil	1935	20 in x 30 in (50.8 cm x 76.2 cm)		SIRIS Collection Number 89550005
Retrieving Geese	Online image	oil	1937	20.3 in x 30.3 in (51.6 cm x 77 cm)		SIRIS Collection Number 63005520
The Lobsterman		watercolor and graphite on paper	1937	19 in x 25.5 in (48.3 cm x 64.8 cm)	Farnsworth Art Museum, Rockland, ME	Scene: lobsterman at work on the water. SIRIS Collection Number 18660433
Sailing out with Duck Decoys	Online image	watercolor	1937	18.3 in x 24.5 in (46.5 cm x 62.2 cm)		Scene: waterfowl hunter heading out in small sailing boat loaded with duck decoys.
Dory Fishermen		oil on canvas	1941	25 in x 30 in (63.5 cm x 76.2 cm)	Private collection	Scene: 3 figures in 2 boats at sea in foreground; sailboat in distance. Dory Fishermen is believed to be a painting of Benson, his son George and a hired man on a fishing trip. The Bensons caught, smoked and shipped large bathes of mackerel to their home in Salem, Massachusetts where they enjoyed them all winter. SIRIS Collection Number 89170106
Dory Fishermen	Online image	oil on canvas	1941	36 in x 30 in (91.4 cm x 76.2 cm)	Private collection	Scene: 3 figures in 2 boats at sea in foreground; sailboat in distance.
Taking a Shot	Online image	ink wash on paper		12 in x 17 in (30.5 cm x 43.2 cm)		Scene: waterfowl hunters in a small boat.
Salmon Fisherman		watercolor		20 in x 17 in (50.8 cm x 43.2 cm)		SIRIS Collection Number 89170071
Small Boats	Online image	etching		10 in x 15 in (25.4 cm x 38.1 cm)	Achenbach Foundation for Graphic Arts, California Palace of the Legion of Honor, San Francisco, CA	
After the Hunt		etching/print		17.8 in x 30 in (45.2 cm x 76.2 cm)		
Brick Barge	Online image	etching/print		8 in x 10 in (20.3 cm x 25.4 cm)	Museum of Fine Arts, Boston, Boston, MA; Mead Art Museum, Amherst College, Amherst, MA	
The Seiner	Online image	etching/print		6.5 in x 10.8 in (16.5 cm x 27.4 cm)	Museum of Fine Arts, Boston, Boston, MA	Scene: seiner.
The Cedar Bank	Online image	watercolor on paper		13.1 in x 19.6 in (33.3 cm x 49.8 cm)	Museum of Fine Arts, Boston, Boston, MA	SIRIS Collection Number 20492295
Waterlillies	Online image					
An Estuary Scene		etching/print		5.9 in x 7.9 in (15 cm x 20.1 cm)	Memorial Art Gallery, University of Rochester, Rochester, NY	
Moonlight	Online image	etching/print		7 in x 9 in (17.8 cm x 22.9 cm)	Mead Art Museum, Amherst College, Amherst, MA	Scene: figures onboard looking out to sea.
Footbridge Boothbay	Online image	watercolor on light board		10 in x 14 in (25.4 cm x 35.6 cm)		Scene: Boothbay Harbor, ME.
Going Out	Online image	ink wash		7.8 in x 10.8 in (19.8 cm x 27.4 cm)		Scene: small boats setting out in waterscape.
River in Flood		oil		36.1 in x 44 in (91.7 cm x 111.8 cm)		Scene: male figures with canoe on raging river. SIRIS Collection Number 89170003, 61504422
Restigouche at Sunset	Online image	oil on canvas		32 in x 40 in (81.3 cm x 101.6 cm)		Scene: figure standing in canoe poling on quiet river.
Duck Hunt in a Boat	Online image	watercolor on paper				
Along the Shore	Online image	watercolor				
Untitled	Online image	oil on canvas				Scene: coastal landscape with trees and old barge on shore.
Our Cove (Wooster Cove), North Haven, Maine	Online image	watercolor on paper		16.5 in x 20 in (41.9 cm x 50.8 cm)		Scene: coastal landscape with small boats in water.

== Bibliography ==
- Bedford, F. "Benson Biography 2". Faith Andrews Bedford. Archived from the original on 2012-03-25.
- Bedford, F (2000). The sporting art of Frank W. Benson. Jaffrey, NH: David R. Godine. ISBN 1-56792-111-6.
- Benson, F.; Paff, A. (1917). Etchings and Drypoints by Frank W. Benson. Boston and New York: Houghton Mifflin Company.
- Benson, F.; Paff, A. (1919). Etchings and Drypoints by Frank W. Benson. Boston and New York: Houghton Mifflin Company.
- Chambers, B. "Frank W. Benson, Red and Gold". Butler Institute of American Art. Archived from the original on 2011-09-27.
- "Frank W. Benson, American Impressionist, Exhibition". Peabody Essex Museum. Archived from the original on 2011-07-25.
- "Frank W. Benson, American Impressionist, Interactive presentation, Gallery". Peabody Essex Museum. Archived from the original on 2011-07-25.
- "Frank W. Benson, American Impressionist, Interactive presentation, Timeline". Peabody Essex Museum. Archived from the original on 2011-07-25.
- "Frank W. Benson, Collection". Boston Museum of Art.
- "Frank W. Benson, Collection". Cornell University, Online Collection. Archived from the original on April 7, 2014.
- "Frank W. Benson, Collection". Cleveland Museum of Art, Ohio.
- "Frank W. Benson, Collection". National of Art, Washington D.C.
- "Frank W. Benson, Collection". University of New Hampshire.
- "Frank Weston Benson, Collection". Art Institute of Chicago.
- "Portrait of My Daughters". Worcester Art Museum.
- The Sisters, Terra Foundation for American Art
- "Summer". Rhode Island School of Design Museum. Archived from the original on 2011-06-10.
- "Smithsonian Institution Research Information System (SIRIS)". Smithsonian Institution.
- "Sunlight". Indianapolis Museum of Art.
