= Drywasher =

Gold mining implement

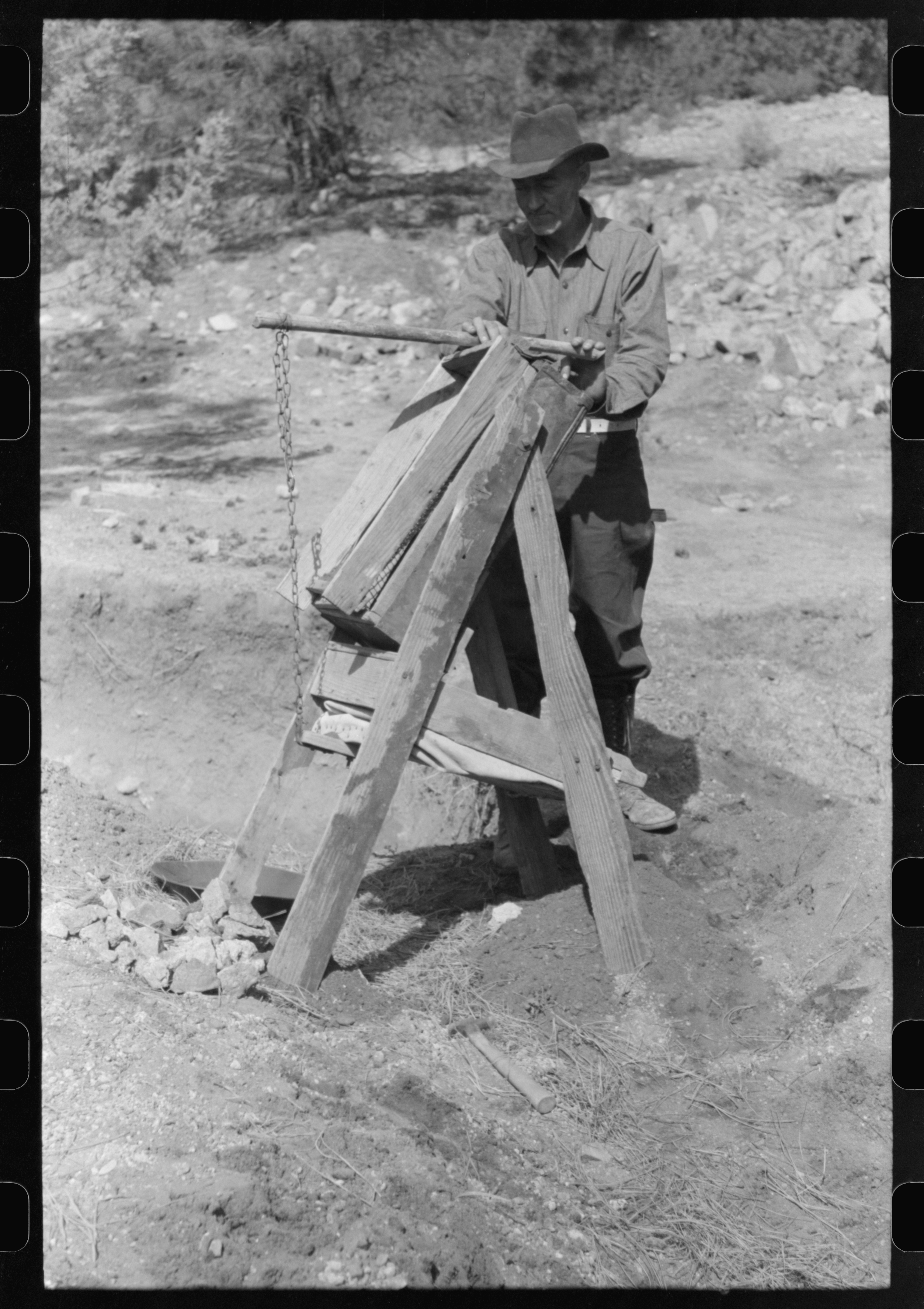
Prospector operating a drywasher, called a papago. The rocks and dirt are placed in the higher compartment. Below and to the back is a bellows made of canvas. This is pumped to blow through the screening and thus blow away loose dirt while the heavy gold remains. Pinos Altos, New Mexico, 1940.

A drywasher is a common desert mining tool for gold mining.

A drywasher is like a highbanker, since it uses a motor and a form of sluice, but it has no need for water; the drywasher operates by the use of air. By forcing air to flow up through the material as it moves down the sluice, the heavier materials, like gold, will stay at the bottom and get trapped by the riffles while the lighter materials will flow up and over the riffles or be blown away. The lighter material that is not blown away will slowly flow down the sluice and fall out the end of the sluice.

Drywasher - A mechanical apparatus used for separating free particles of placer gold from dry sediments. Dry placers represent a major portion of all alluvial gold deposits around the globe. Extreme aridity in southern hemispheric regions of the planet causes a slower rate of erosion on placer deposits than if rainfall were plentiful and regional watersheds were hydrologically active. This absence of water directly correlates to the low moisture content of alluvial sediments and the short distance gold moves from its hardrock source. A drywasher works on the principle of gravity separation. Since gold, at 19.1 specific gravity, is much heavier than most other minerals found in local sediments, a facsimile of certain natural conditions (which would involve the use of water, if it were available) can be mechanically reproduced with a simple machine using dry air instead of water as the medium of separation. The process of excavating dry, compacted sediments will often loosen or unpack them. Then, as long as the material is sufficiently dry, these gravels can be processed with a drywasher in a relatively efficient manner.

A drywasher was also known, at one time, as a Mexican air jig. To use a drywasher, first, one must determine if the raw material is dry enough to be efficiently processed. Once the machine is set up and stabilized, using a shovel, the dirt, clay, sand, gravel, etc. is loaded onto the uppermost part of the device — the screen, or "grizzly". Sediments classified by the grizzly, drop into another part of the apparatus known as "the hopper". Once the machine is activated, the finer, gold-bearing material travels down an inclined, vibrating chute, passing over a series of "riffles" in a recovery tray. This process varies slightly from machine to machine. Heavier minerals, principally gold and fine-grained black sands (various iron minerals), are separated from the paydirt and reconcentrated by this means. Panning, or some other final separation process, comes afterwards.

The first machines were, in all likelihood, operated manually. A simple one can be constructed using a wooden framework, a hopper, a recovery tray, bellows, lever, and cord. Before the advent of modern metal screening material, sorting of gravels into smaller particles might have been done by hand. Such elimination of larger rocks aids in separating gold from dry, auriferous sediments to be processed, consequently, any modern "puffer-belly" could be outfitted with a screen, or "grizzly" for sorting the dry gravels into two sizes.
