= Moose Creek (Yukon) =

River in Canada

Moose Creek is a creek in western Yukon, Canada.

The landscape surrounding Moose Creek lies in the Northern Cordilleran Volcanic Province. During the Cenozoic era, volcanic activity engulfed the Moose Creek area. However, the type of volcanic landform these volcanics represent is unknown.

== See also ==
- List of rivers of Yukon
- List of volcanoes in Canada
- List of Northern Cordilleran volcanoes
- Volcanism of Canada
- Volcanism of Northern Canada
