= Moore High School (Oklahoma) =

Location
- 300 North Eastern Avenue; Moore, Oklahoma 73160; United States; 35°20′25″N 97°28′32″W

Information
- Type: Public
- Established: 1920; 106 years ago
- Locale: Suburban
- School district: Moore Public Schools
- Principal: Rachel Stark
- Teaching staff: 123.63 (on an FTE basis)
- Grades: 9-12
- Enrollment: 2,688 (2024-2025)
- Student to teacher ratio: 21.82
- Colors: Red & royal blue
- Athletics conference: OSSAA Class 6A
- Nickname: Lions
- Rivals: Southmoore High School; Westmoore High School
- Website: moorehs.mooreschools.com

Moore High School is a four-year public high school located in Moore, Oklahoma, a suburb south of Oklahoma City. The school is led by one head principal and five class principals. Moore High School opened in 1920 and serves grades 9-12. It is the only high school that serves the east side of Moore.

Moore offers a program in which 11th or 12th-grade students may apply to take morning or afternoon courses as offered at Moore Norman Technology Center. Twenty-seven Advanced Placement courses are offered by MHS in topics including AP Music Theory, AP Studio Art, and AP Psychology.

== Past ==
The original Moore School was built in 1899 next to City Hall on Broadway. It burned down in 1928, and was rebuilt soon after. It served as a school for eight graders on the ground floor, and as the high school on the top floor until 1958.

After the New Moore High School was built, the Old School's first floor has been used as a business outlet. The second floor is untouched, with lockers remaining on the walls.

One of the current businesses occupying the Old School, Trifecta Communications, created the documentary If These Walls Could Talk: The History of Moore's Old School, which includes interviews with alumni.

== Notable alumni ==
- Tom Cole (class of 1967): current U.S. congressman from Oklahoma; former Oklahoma Secretary of State and state senator
- Sherrie Conley: politician
- Mike Hinckley (class of 2001): relief pitcher selected in the third round of the 2001 Major League Baseball draft and debuted in Major League Baseball with the Washington Nationals in 2008
- Corey Ivy (class of 1995): American football cornerback who played for the University of Oklahoma and in the NFL and UFL from 2001 to 2010
- Jesse Jane (born Cindy Taylor) (class of 1998): pornographic actress
- Toby Keith (class of 1979): country singer
- Jay Villemarette: owner, founder, and president of Skulls Unlimited International and Skeletons: Museum of Osteology
- Randy Wayne (class of 1999): TV and film actor
