= Baseball rubbing mud =

Mud used to treat baseballs

Baseball rubbing mud is mud that has been gathered or prepared for the purpose of rubbing it on a baseball. Balls made for the sport of baseball have a somewhat slick and glossy surface when they are newly manufactured, so before they are used in official league games, they are rubbed down with mud to reduce their slickness and give pitchers a firmer grip and better control. Major League Baseball rules require every "pearl", or brand-new baseball, to be rubbed with mud for at least 30 seconds on game day until it achieves the desired texture and off-white color.

The effects of adding a substance to the ball have called the attention of physicists over the years.

== History ==
Historically, baseballs were rubbed in a mixture of water and infield soil, but the result can be inconsistent and can sometimes discolor the ball's leather surface. Other alternatives that have been used are tobacco juice, shoe polish, and soil from under stadium bleachers. These successfully took off the sheen from baseballs, but at the same time, they could also damage, discolor or scratch the ball's leather.

Currently, before all Major League (MLB) and Minor League (MiLB) baseball games, an umpire or clubhouse attendant rubs six dozen or more balls with mud.

The practice is required by MLB Rule 4.01(c), which states that all baseballs shall be "properly rubbed so that the gloss is removed".

Mechanical efforts to break baseballs have not proved satisfactory. MLB has been researching an alternative process, but as of 2025 has not found a satisfactory alternative to rubbing them by hand with mud.

Mud is similarly used for by some National Football League teams for preparing footballs.

== The Lena Blackburne brand ==
The most prominent brand of specially prepared mud that is sold specifically for this purpose is Lena Blackburne Baseball Rubbing Mud. Although official rules do not require using specially prepared mud, and although other brands do exist, none of the other brands are well known, and the market for specially prepared mud is so small that the Blackburne brand does not generate enough revenue to pay for a single person's full-time employment.

Lena Blackburne was an American baseball player who played professionally between 1910 and 1929, and he moved on to becoming a coach, manager, and scout for the sport until at least 1948. When he was a third-base coach for the Philadelphia Athletics (now based in Sacramento, California), an umpire complained to him about the ball preparation method used at the time, prompting Blackburne in 1938 to set out in search of better mud to use for the purpose. Later that decade, Blackburne discovered a suitable rubbing mud (in a location said to be "near" Palmyra, New Jersey) and founded the company that he used to sell it – Lena Blackburne Baseball Rubbing Mud. According to the company, the entire American League began using the mud soon after its discovery, and by the 1950s, it was in use by every Major League team, along with some Minor League and college teams.

When advancing age prevented him from harvesting the mud, Blackburne, who died in 1968, left the company to a friend, John Haas, who the company says had accompanied him during his searches for an appropriate mud. Haas later left the company to his son-in-law Burns Bintliff, who selected one of his nine children, the current owner Jim, to carry on the business. Jim Bintliff told CNN in 2009 that the company brought in only about $20,000 per year, and that he was working full time as a printing press operator. Each of the 30 MLB teams receives 10 pounds (4.5 kg) of the mud at the start of each season.

The Lena Blackburne branded mud originates from the New Jersey side of the Delaware River. It is cleaned and screened before sale. Each year Jim Bintliff visits the mud's source, returns with 1,000 pounds (454 kg) of it to store over the winter, and sells it the following baseball season. Bintliff told CNN:

If anybody happens to catch me in the act of harvesting mud, I come up with a story to give them a reason I'm putting mud in a bucket. I've told people I use it in my garden, I use it for my rose bushes, I use it for bee stings and poison ivy and any kind of story.

The collection process was featured in 2003 on the first episode of the Dirty Jobs television series, titled "Bat Cave Scavenger". Jim Bintliff showed host Mike Rowe how he identifies and collects the right mud before processing it and preparing it for shipping.

The branded mud's key characteristic is that it is "very fine, like thick chocolate pudding", and it has been considered the "perfect baseball-rubbing mud". A study in 2024 found that the mud contains an ideal mixture of clay and water, coating the ball with an adhesive residue, while the suspended sand grains enhance friction and therefore the pitcher's grip.
