= List of Dirty Jobs episodes =

Dirty Jobs is a program on the Discovery Channel, produced by Pilgrim Films & Television, in which host Mike Rowe is shown performing difficult, strange, disgusting, or messy occupational duties alongside the typical employees. The show premiered with three pilot episodes in November 2003. It returned as a series on July 26, 2005, and ended on September 12, 2012, with a total of 169 episodes spanning eight seasons. The series returned on July 7, 2020, with a spin-off titled Dirty Jobs: Rowe'd Trip.

The original series returned on January 2, 2022.

== Episodes ==
=== Series overview ===
| Season | Episodes | Originally released | |
| Season | Episodes | First released | Last released |
|---|---|---|---|
| Pilots | 3 | November 7, 2003 | November 21, 2003 |
| 1 | 6 | July 26, 2005 | August 30, 2005 |
| 2 | 45 | September 27, 2005 | March 20, 2007 |
| 3 | 34 | June 26, 2007 | July 29, 2008 |
| 4 | 21 | October 7, 2008 | April 12, 2009 |
| 5 | 22 | October 6, 2009 | June 14, 2010 |
| 6 | 23 | October 19, 2010 | March 8, 2011 |
| 7 | 11 | December 13, 2011 | February 21, 2012 |
| 8 | 4 | August 22, 2012 | September 12, 2012 |
| Rowe'd Trip | 4 | July 7, 2020 | July 28, 2020 |
| 9 | 6 | January 2, 2022 | February 6, 2022 |
| 10 | 8 | December 11, 2022 | February 5, 2023 |

=== Pilot episodes (2003) ===
| No. overall | No. in season | Title | Original release date |
|---|---|---|---|
| 1 | P1 | "Bat Cave Scavenger" | November 7, 2003 |
Bat biologist (bat guano collector) in Bracken Cave, bat rehabilitator, Baseball Rubbing Mud, fish gutter
| 2 | P2 | "Worm Dung Farmer" | November 14, 2003 |
Catfish noodler in Eufaula, Oklahoma, septic tank technician in the Madison, Wisconsin area., worm castings rancher in Florida
| 3 | P3 | "Roadkill Cleaner" | November 21, 2003 |
Golf ball diver, horse breeder, roadkill collector

=== Season 1 (2005) ===
| No. overall | No. in season | Title | Original release date |
|---|---|---|---|
| 4 | 1 | "Chinatown Garbage Collector" | July 26, 2005 |
Garbage collector/recycling separator in San Francisco/composter (vineyard), shark catcher/tagger, car recycling
| 5 | 2 | "Sewer Inspector" | August 2, 2005 |
Sewer inspector, disaster cleanup crew member (basement sewer), demolition worker (office building interior)
| 6 | 3 | "Pig Farmer" | August 9, 2005 |
Pig farmer in Woodward, Iowa, removing chewing gum from sidewalks, pigeon droppings removal
| 7 | 4 | "Chick Sexer" | August 16, 2005 |
Baby chicken sexer, beer brewer, oyster harvester
| 8 | 5 | "Vexcon" | August 23, 2005 |
Exterminator (which would lead to the A&E series "Billy the Exterminator" in 2009), crab fisherman, blacksmith/farrier
| 9 | 6 | "Sludge Cleaner" | August 30, 2005 |
Surfboard maker, beekeeper, sludge recycler

=== Season 2 (2005–07) ===
| No. overall | No. in season | Title | Original release date |
|---|---|---|---|
| 10 | 1 | "Hot Tar Roofer" | September 27, 2005 |
Hot tar roofer, house movers
| 11 | 2 | "Ostrich Farmer" | October 4, 2005 |
Coffee plantation, marine mammal rescuer, ostrich wrangler
| 12 | 3 | "Cheese Maker" | October 11, 2005 |
Zoo keeper (San Francisco Zoo), cheese maker, volcanic ash mud bath mixer
| 13 | 4 | "Shrimper" | October 18, 2005 |
Shrimper, mudbug harvester (crawfish), tire recyclers
| 14 | 5 | "Bio-Diesel Man" | October 25, 2005 |
Cob home builder, bee exterminator, biodiesel man
| 15 | 6 | "Micro-Algae Man" | November 1, 2005 |
Pet groomer, micro-algae man, charcoal maker (lump charcoal factory)
| 16 | 7 | "Chimney Sweeper Chimney Safety Institute of America" | November 8, 2005 |
Chimney sweeper, underwater logger, scrap metal recycler
| 17 | 8 | "Dirtiest Animals" | December 13, 2005 |
Revisit of dirty jobs involving animals: pig farmer ("Pig Farmer"), baby chicken sexer ("Chick Sexer"), pet groomer ("Micro-Algae Man"), horse breeder ("Roadkill Cleaner"), ostrich farmer ("Ostrich Farmer")
| 18 | 9 | "Dirtiest Water Jobs" | December 20, 2005 |
Revisit of dirty jobs involving water: shark catcher/tagger ("Chinatown Garbage Collector"), golf ball diver ("Roadkill Cleaner"), oyster harvester ("Chick Sexer"), crawfish catcher ("Shrimper"), catfish noodler ("Worm Dung Farmer"), shrimper ("Shrimper")
| 19 | 10 | "Creepy Critters" | December 27, 2005 |
Revisit of dirty jobs involving insects: exterminator ("Vexcon"), crab fisherman ("Vexcon"), honey harvester ("Sludge Cleaner"), bee exterminator ("Bio-Diesel Man"), worm rancher ("Worm Dung Farmer"), bat guano collector ("Bat Cave Scavenger"), bat rehabilitator ("Bat Cave Scavenger")
| 20 | 11 | "Dirtiest Tools & Machines" | January 3, 2006 |
Revisit of dirty jobs involving machines: house mover ("Hot Tar Roofer"), tire recycler ("Shrimper"), demolition worker ("Sewer Inspector"), scrap metal recycler ("Chimney Sweeper"), golf ball diver ("Roadkill Cleaner"), hot tar roofer ("Hot Tar Roofer")
| 21 | 12 | "Super Dirty" | January 3, 2006 |
Revisit of dirtiest jobs: disaster cleanup crew member ("Sewer Inspector"), septic tank technician ("Worm Dung Farmer"), sewer inspector ("Sewer Inspector"), sludge recycler ("Sludge Cleaner"), fish gutter ("Bat Cave Scavenger"), charcoal maker ("Micro-Algae Man")
| 22 | 13 | "Avian Vomitologist" | January 10, 2006 |
Marble miner, owl vomit collector, cattle rancher (cow breeding)
| 23 | 14 | "Turkey Farmer" | January 17, 2006 |
Turkey farmer, potato farmer, waste water sewage plant
| 24 | 15 | "Alligator Farmer" | January 24, 2006 |
Sugarcane mill, firefighter (Fremont, CA), alligator farmer
| 25 | 16 | "Viewer's Choice" | January 31, 2006 |
Answering viewer mail, outtakes, cow feed mill
| 26 | 17 | "Mushroom Farmer" | March 7, 2006 |
Mushroom farmer, storm drain cleaner, drain cover foundry
| 27 | 18 | "Plumber" | March 14, 2006 |
Plumber, drilling mud, rough necker (oil drilling)
| 28 | 19 | "Termite Controller" | March 21, 2006 |
Concrete spreader, termite exterminator (Billy the Exterminator), concrete truck cleaner
| 29 | 20 | "Casino Food Recycler" | June 13, 2006 |
Lance Burton animal handler, food recycler/pig farmer
| 30 | 21 | "Rose Parade Float Dismantler" | June 20, 2006 |
Coke manufacturing, oyster shucker, Rose Parade float dismantler
| 31 | 22 | "Garbage Pit Technician" | June 27, 2006 |
Lithographer, terra cotta facade maker, converting trash into electricity
| 32 | 23 | "Skull Cleaner" | July 11, 2006 |
Keeping trains on track (gandy dancer), cracklin and boudin sausage maker, cleaning animal skulls with Skulls Unlimited for display in educational facilities around the world
| 33 | 24 | "Geoduck Farmer" | July 18, 2006 |
Malibu Bay preservation – dam demolition, pipe organ specialist, geoduck farmer
| 34 | 25 | "Fuel Tank Cleaner" | July 25, 2006 |
Candy maker, truck tire retreading, KC-135R Stratotanker fuel tank cleaner (22nd Air Refueling Wing, McConnell AFB)
| 35 | 26 | "Jobs That Bite" | July 30, 2006 |
2-hour Shark Week special: shark cage, tiger shark necropsy, shark tagging, shark repellent researcher, shark spotter
| 36 | 27 | "Jobs That Bite... Harder" | August 4, 2006 |
Shark Week special: fish taxidermist, shark suit tester, outtakes
| 37 | 28 | "Coal Miner" | August 8, 2006 |
Salvage expert (Upsala College), coal miner
| 38 | 29 | "Hoof Cleaner" | August 15, 2006 |
Basalt quarry, hippopotamus keeper (Adventure Aquarium), cow hoof trimmer
| 39 | 30 | "Alpaca Shearer" | August 22, 2006 |
Mussel farmer, taro farmer, alpaca shearer
| 40 | 31 | "Monkey Caretaker" | August 29, 2006 |
Vervet monkey rehabilitator (Animal Protection & Environmental Sanctuary, KwaZulu-Natal, South Africa)
| 41 | 32 | "100th Dirty Job Special" | September 5, 2006 |
2-hour special: U. S. Army mechanic (Wheel Vehicle Mechanic School, Bravo Company, 187th Ordnance Battalion, Fort Jackson), pig shaver, answering viewer mail, behind-the-scenes, outtakes, montage: Mike and animals, and world premiere of "Dirty Jobs Anthem".
| 42 | 33 | "Snake Researcher" | November 28, 2006 |
Bait and lobster fisherman, Lake Erie seaweed cleanup, Lake Erie water snake researcher (Stone Laboratory). Episode was filmed August 10, 2006.
| 43 | 34 | "Penguin Keeper" | December 5, 2006 |
Concrete stamping, penguin keeper (Aquarium of the Americas), blood worm digger
| 44 | 35 | "Bell Maker" | December 12, 2006 |
Stamford hurricane barrier zinc anode changer (U.S. Army Corps of Engineers), bell maker (McShane Bell Foundry)
| 45 | 36 | "Mosquito Control Officer" | December 19, 2006 |
New Orleans post-Katrina jobs: house demolition/gutting, rodent control, mosquito control and poison testing
| 46 | 37 | "Bug Breeder" | January 9, 2007 |
Tree trimmer and stump grinder, fainting goat farmer, exotic insect breeder at the Audubon Insectarium
| 47 | 38 | "Poo Pot Maker" | January 16, 2007 |
Surveying salmon spawning grounds (Feather River, California Department of Water Resources), viewer mail concerning income of the Lake Erie water snake researcher ("Snake Researcher"), manufacturing CowPots (a type of flower pot made from cow manure)
| 48 | 39 | "Mule Logger" | January 23, 2007 |
Wine barrel maker, logging with mules
| 49 | 40 | "Well Digger" | January 30, 2007 |
Bowie Baysox groundskeeper, placing boat moorings (Lake Winnipesaukee), geothermal well driller
| 50 | 41 | "Cave Digger" | February 20, 2007 |
Wine cave digger, baggage handler (Southwest Airlines, Kansas City International Airport), incinerator for trash from international flights (Kansas City International Airport)
| 51 | 42 | "Salt Miner" | February 27, 2007 |
Behind-the-scenes, salt miner (Hutchinson, KS)
| 52 | 43 | "Wine Maker" | March 6, 2007 |
Winemaker, cattle feed farmer (Partridge, Kansas)
| 53 | 44 | "Steam Ship Cleaner" | March 13, 2007 |
Hydroseeding, viewer mail on additional footage of a Malaysian walking leaf (Phyllium giganteum) from the Audubon Insectarium, cleaning the inside of the boilers of the steam yacht Medea.
| 54 | 45 | "Really Dirty Animals" | March 20, 2007 |
Revisit of dirty jobs involving animals: alpaca shearer, fainting goat farmer, vervet monkey rehabilitator, cattle rancher (cow breeding), penguin keeper, ostrich farmer, food recycler/pig farmer, logging with mules

=== Season 3 (2007–08) ===
| No. overall | No. in season | Title | Original release date |
|---|---|---|---|
| 55 | 1 | "Billboard Installer" | June 26, 2007 |
Billboard installer
| 56 | 2 | "Snake Wrangler" | July 10, 2007 |
Reptile handler
| 57 | 3 | "Leather Tanner" | July 17, 2007 |
Clay jug potter specializing in faces on the jug, tannery
| 58 | 4 | "Dirtiest Machines on the Planet" | July 24, 2007 |
Revisit of jobs involving dirty machines: oil derrick ("Plumber"), coal mine mucker ("Coal Miner"), recycling center trommel ("Chinatown Garbage Collector"), sewage treatment plant lift pump ("Turkey Farmer"), wine cave roadheader ("Cave Digger"). Top 10 dirtiest rides: scrap metal recycler scissor tractor ("Chimney Sweeper"), Bowie Baysox tractor/lawnmower ("Well Digger"), turkey composter front loader ("Turkey Farmer"), roadkill pickup truck ("Roadkill Cleaner"), owl vomit collector bicycle ("Avian Vomitologist"), junkyard jalopy ("Chinatown Garbage Collector"), garbage truck ("Chinatown Garbage Collector"), Heavy Expanded Mobility Tactical Truck ("100th Dirty Job Special"), poo pulling tractor ("Hoof Cleaner"), pig farm slop truck ("Pig Farmer")
| 59 | 5 | "Bridge Painter" | August 7, 2007 |
Mackinac Bridge maintenance worker, NASA Crawler-transporter lubricator
| 60 | 6 | "Vomit Island Workers" | August 14, 2007 |
Fish farming hybrid striped bass, tilapia, and carp; bird conservation ("Vomit Island," Ohio)
| 61 | 7 | "Alligator Egg Collector" | August 21, 2007 |
Return visit to alligator farm from "Alligator Farmer" episode: egg collecting, West Nile virus testing, and release of alligators. While filming the release of the alligators, the air boat carrying the film crew flips.
| 62 | 8 | "Wild Goose Chase" | August 28, 2007 |
Mackinac Island horse manure and garbage removal/composting, H5N1 avian influenza testing and goose tagging (Yukon Delta National Wildlife Refuge)
| 63 | 9 | "Crew's Cruise" | September 18, 2007 |
The Dirty Jobs crew take a Royal Caribbean cruise and reflect on their dirtiest episodes while being pampered aboard the ship.
| 64 | 10 | "150th Dirty Job Extravaganza" | October 23, 2007 |
2-hour special: Yak and bison rancher (shown again in 2008 on Animal Barber episode), outtakes, celebration of 150 dirty jobs milestone at the San Francisco recycling center with top 10 viewer's choice dirty jobs: monkey caretaker ("Monkey Caretaker"), mudbug harvester ("Shrimper"), cattle rancher ("Avian Vomitologist"), Lake Erie water snake researcher ("Snake Researcher"), exterminator ("Vexcon" and "Termite Controller"), child of pig farmer ("Casino Food Recycler"), shrimper ("Shrimper"), charcoal maker ("Micro-Algae Man"), shark suit maker ("Jobs That Bite... Harder"), and cow hoof trimmer ("Hoof Cleaner") with appearances by airport incinerator operator ("Cave Digger"), reptile handlers ("Snake Wrangler"), candymakers ("Fuel Tank Cleaner"), and wine cave digger ("Cave Digger").
| 65 | 11 | "Special Effects Artist" | October 30, 2007 |
Giant kelp harvesting for abalone farming, Mike gets sick (not job-related), special effects make-up artist
| 66 | 12 | "Reef Ball Maker" | November 6, 2007 |
Artificial reef maker, goat milk soap maker, frac tank refurbisher
| 67 | 13 | "Exotic Animal Keeper" | November 13, 2007 |
Working at "transfer station" at San Francisco dump, exotic species (gray wolf, cougar, pot-bellied pig, deer, bearcat, turkey, royal Tibetan yak, camel, cow, goat) sanctuary
| 68 | 14 | "Creepy, Slimy and Just Plain Weird" | November 20, 2007 |
Revisit of dirty jobs involving animals hosted from East Bay Vivarium: alligator farmer ("Alligator Farmer"), blood worm digger ("Penguin Keeper"), exotic insect breeder ("Bug Breeder"), skull cleaner ("Skull Cleaner"), Lake Erie water snake researcher ("Snake Researcher"), and geoduck farmer ("Geoduck Farmer")
| 69 | 15 | "Spray Insulation Technician" | November 27, 2007 |
Cleaning airport runway paint striper (Kansas City International Airport), collecting diapers for odor analysis, spray installation of cellulose insulation
| 70 | 16 | "Dirty Innovators & Entrepreneurs" | December 4, 2007 |
Revisit of dirty innovators and entrepreneurs: CowPots maker ("Poo Pot Maker"), cow hoof trimmer ("Hoof Cleaner"), owl vomit collector ("Avian Vomitologist"), food recycler/pig farmer ("Casino Food Recycler"), lobster fisherman ("Snake Researcher"), shark suit tester ("Jobs That Bite... Harder")
| 71 | 17 | "Big Animal Vet" | January 8, 2008 |
Cleaning barbecue smoker, large animal veterinarian, removing underground fuel oil storage tank
| 72 | 18 | "Steel Mill Worker" | January 15, 2008 |
Recycling Mississippi River barge, steel mill worker
| 73 | 19 | "Cave Biologist" | January 22, 2008 |
Cave biologist (Hidden River Cave, Kentucky), hagfish fisherman
| 74 | 20 | "Buoy Cleaner" | January 29, 2008 |
Cedar shake and shingle maker, buoy tender (USCGC Aspen)
| 75 | 21 | "Cranberry Farmer" | February 5, 2008 |
Handmade brick maker; cranberry harvesting; cranberry jam, jelly, and syrup maker.
| 76 | 22 | "Mud Mineral Excavator" | February 12, 2008 |
Mining and bird rehabilitation at Searles Lake, rice milling
| 77 | 23 | "Tight Spaces" | February 19, 2008 |
Revisit of jobs involving tight spaces: stripping and painting inside of Mackinac Bridge tower ("Bridge Painter"), replacing pipe underneath house ("Plumber"), KC-135R Stratotanker fuel tank cleaner and boom operator ("Fuel Tank Cleaner"), Stamford hurricane barrier zinc anode changer ("Bell Maker"), storm drain cleaner ("Mushroom Farmer"), cleaning the inside of the boilers of the steam yacht Medea ("Steam Ship Cleaner")
| 78 | 24 | "Brown Plate Special" | February 26, 2008 |
Revisit of jobs involving food: Coffee plantation ("Ostrich Farmer"); fish farmer ("Vomit Island Workers"); potato farmer ("Turkey Farmer"); oyster shucker ("Rose Parade Float Dismantler"); boudin sausage maker ("Skull Cleaner"); viewer mail asking about top 10 memorable tastes: ground crab shells ("Vexcon"), geoduck stomach ("Geoduck Farmer"), fish mash (marine mammal rescuer, "Ostrich Farmer"), termite insecticide ("Termite Controller"), tortilla chip from dirty kitchen ("Bio-Diesel Man"), mealworms ("Bat Cave Scavenger"), crawfish ("Shrimper"), cob ("Bio-Diesel Man"), mussels ("Alpaca Shearer"), animal bodily fluids ("Big Animal Vet"); candy maker ("Fuel Tank Cleaner")
| 79 | 25 | "Dirty Jobs of the Big Apple" | April 14, 2008 |
Dirty jobs in New York City: Building and installing rooftop water tower, cleaning elevator shaft in brownstone
| 80 | 26 | "Floating Fish Factory" | April 21, 2008 |
Fishing and processing of fish aboard the F/V Legacy, a trawl fishing vessel and at-sea fishprocessor in Alaska's Bering Sea; viewer mail
| 81 | 27 | "Dairy Cow Midwife" | April 28, 2008 |
Working on a dairy farm: milking, artificial insemination, cow midwife
| 82 | 28 | "Aerial Tram Greaser" | May 5, 2008 |
Erosion control technician, aerial tram maintenance (Palm Springs Aerial Tramway)
| 83 | 29 | "Turkey Inseminator" | May 12, 2008 |
Making a home energy efficient by improving insulation, turkey artificial insemination, viewer mail – car crusher
| 84 | 30 | "Ice Salvage Crew" | May 19, 2008 |
Cleaning up diesel spill in Dutch Harbor, Alaska, salvaging truck from bottom of lake
| 85 | 31 | "Wind Farm Technician" | June 2, 2008 |
Wind turbine generator technician, garbage removal from sinkhole, printing press operator
| 86 | 32 | "Animal Barber" | June 9, 2008 |
Making shampoo from mud, horse castration (additional footage from large animal veterinarian, "Big Animal Vet"), yak and bison rancher (additional footage from yak and bison ranch, "150th Dirty Job Extravaganza")
| 87 | 33 | "Brown Before Green" | June 16, 2008 |
Revisit of jobs that are "eco-friendly": geothermal well driller ("Well Digger"), underwater logger ("Chimney Sweeper"), cedar shake and shingle maker ("Buoy Cleaner"), tire recycler ("Shrimper"), truck tire retreading ("Fuel Tank Cleaner"), cob home builder ("Bio-Diesel Man"), Malibu Bay preservation – dam demolition ("Geoduck Farmer"), cave biologist ("Cave Biologist"), bee exterminator ("Bio-Diesel Man"), exotic insect breeder ("Bug Breeder")
| 88 | 34 | "Greenland Shark Quest" | July 29, 2008 |
Shark Week special: Researching the greenland shark

=== Season 4 (2008–09) ===
| No. overall | No. in season | Title | Original release date |
|---|---|---|---|
| 89 | 1 | "Tar Rigger" | October 7, 2008 |
Working on the windjammer merchant ship Star of India: polishing the binnacle spheres, caulking the deck, tarring the rigging, tallowing the mast, preserving the jibboom from termite damage, inspecting the inside of the bowsprit
| 90 | 2 | "Dirty Chip Maker" | October 14, 2008 |
Potato chip maker, effluent channel "muffin monster" building cleaner at the Rifle, Colorado wastewater treatment plant
| 91 | 3 | "Sheep Castrator" | October 21, 2008 |
Cutting concrete wall, sheep shearing, docking and castrating lambs
| 92 | 4 | "Leech Trapper" | October 28, 2008 |
Leech trapping, making raw meat dog food out of green tripe
| 93 | 5 | "Dirty Presidents" | November 4, 2008 |
Revisit of jobs related to past Presidents of the United States: Calvin Coolidge, exotic species sanctuary ("Exotic Animal Keeper"); James K. Polk, turkey artificial insemination ("Turkey Inseminator"); Andrew Johnson, New Orleans rodent control ("Mosquito Control Officer"); Herbert Hoover, salt miner ("Salt Miner"); Lyndon B. Johnson, cleaning barbecue smoker ("Big Animal Vet"); Thomas Jefferson, wine barrel maker ("Mule Logger"); Ulysses S. Grant, tannery ("Leather Tanner") and logging with mules ("Mule Logger"); George Washington, fish farming ("Vomit Island Workers"); Andrew Jackson, goose tagging ("Wild Goose Chase"); John Quincy Adams, alligator egg collecting ("Alligator Egg Collector"); Harry S. Truman, pig shaver ("100th Dirty Job Special")
| 94 | 6 | "Mannequin Factory" | November 11, 2008 |
Demolishing a mobile home, making mannequins
| 95 | 7 | "Egg Farm" | November 18, 2008 |
Cleaning diesel fuel from dirt, chicken egg farm
| 96 | 8 | "Vellum Maker" | November 25, 2008 |
Harvesting hops, making vellum from goat skin
| 97 | 9 | "Maggot Farmer" | December 2, 2008 |
Transplanting a saguaro, maggot farmer
| 98 | 10 | "Gourd Maker" | December 9, 2008 |
Cleaning the bottom of Lake Waramaug, making and cross pollinating gourds
| 99 | 11 | "Brown Before Green 2" | December 16, 2008 |
Revisit of jobs that are "eco-friendly": Garbage collector ("Chinatown Garbage Collector"), incinerator for trash from international flights ("Cave Digger"), garbage removal from sinkhole ("Wind Farm Technician"), recycling Mississippi River barge ("Steel Mill Worker"), cleaning up diesel spill ("Ice Salvage Crew"), removing underground fuel oil storage tank ("Big Animal Vet"), demolishing a mobile home ("Mannequin Factory"), making a home energy efficient by improving insulation ("Turkey Inseminator"), making shampoo from mud ("Animal Barber"), wind turbine generator technician ("Wind Farm Technician"), roadkill collector ("Roadkill Cleaner"), Mackinac Island horse manure and garbage removal/composting ("Wild Goose Chase")
| 100 | 12 | "Bologna Maker" | January 6, 2009 |
Bologna maker, incinerating toilet cleaner
| 101 | 13 | "Abandoned Mine Plugger" | January 13, 2009 |
Bird ringing common terns and Canada geese (Ottawa National Wildlife Refuge), abandoned mineshaft plugger
| 102 | 14 | "Animal Rendering" | January 20, 2009 |
Excavator at the La Brea Tar Pits, dead cow renderer
| 103 | 15 | "Goose Down Plucker" | January 27, 2009 |
Walnut harvester, goose and duck feather plucker and dresser
| 104 | 16 | "Diaper Cleaner" | February 3, 2009 |
Olive oil presser, cloth diaper cleaner
| 105 | 17 | "Spider Pharm" | February 10, 2009 |
Suet bird food maker, spider collector and venom extractor
| 106 | 18 | "Locomotive Builder" | February 17, 2009 |
200th dirty job building and refurbishing locomotives (MotivePower): CNC plasma cutting, grit blasting, refurbishing engines
| 107 | 19 | "200 Jobs Look-Back" | February 24, 2009 |
Look back at the previous 200 jobs with additional footage from "Skull Cleaner" and "Turkey Inseminator"
| 108 | 20 | "Mike's Day Off – Special" | March 3, 2009 |
Mike takes the day off to get a physical examination, leaving Executive Producers Eddie Barbini and Craig Piligian to host the show: servicing porta-potties and making custom-fabricated alloy wheels for Boyd Coddington Wheels
| 109 | 21 | "Sled Dog Breeder" | April 12, 2009 |
Breeding and training Alaskan Huskies as sled dogs with Martin Buser; revisit of dirty jobs in Alaska: Bird ringing common terns and Canada geese ("Abandoned Mine Plugger"), fishing and processing of fish ("Floating Fish Factory"), cleaning up diesel spill in Dutch Harbor, Alaska ("Ice Salvage Crew"), incinerating toilet cleaner ("Bologna Maker"). The mail bag portion was taped at the Soo Locks on the floor of the MacArthur Lock in front of the upstream bulkheads.

=== Season 5 (2009–10) ===
| No. overall | No. in season | Title | Original release date |
|---|---|---|---|
| 110 | 1 | "Mattress Recycler" | October 6, 2009 |
Recovering derelict boats, recycling mattresses
| 111 | 2 | "High-Rise Window Washer" | October 13, 2009 |
High-rise window washer, viewer mail: brine tank cleaner (Shark Reef at Mandalay Bay)
| 112 | 3 | "Toilet Crusher" | October 20, 2009 |
Alligator snapping turtle researcher, recycling toilets
| 113 | 4 | "Camel Rancher" | October 27, 2009 |
Dromedary camel dairy
| 114 | 5 | "Tofu Maker" | November 3, 2009 |
E-waste recycler, tofu maker
| 115 | 6 | "Glass Maker" | November 10, 2009 |
Dung beetle researcher (Arkansas State University), studio glass maker (Fenton Art Glass Company)
| 116 | 7 | "Rocky Reach Dam" | November 17, 2009 |
Rocky Reach Dam: Changing main shaft packing and oil on water turbine, tagging salmon with acoustic tags
| 117 | 8 | "Safety Third" | November 24, 2009 |
Revisit and additional footage of jobs involving safety situations: sewer inspector ("Sewer Inspector"), NASA Crawler-transporter lubricator ("Bridge Painter"), billboard installer ("Billboard Installer"), tarring the rigging of Star of India ("Tar Rigger"), reptile handler ("Snake Wrangler"), shark suit tester ("Jobs That Bite... Harder"), U. S. Army mechanic ("100th Dirty Job Special"), job stopped by concerns of United States Army Corps of Engineers Chief of Safety on board a ship clearing debris from waterways, building and installing rooftop water tower ("Dirty Jobs of the Big Apple"), cave biologist ("Cave Biologist"), Mackinac Bridge maintenance worker ("Bridge Painter")
| 118 | 9 | "Reindeer Farm" | December 1, 2009 |
Shrink wrapping a boat to protect it during winter, reindeer farmer
| 119 | 10 | "Marble Maker" | December 8, 2009 |
Dyeing shirts with red dirt from Kauai, marble maker (Jabo Vitro)
| 120 | 11 | "Fireworks Technician" | December 15, 2009 |
Fireworks maker, cow with a hole in its stomach (Arkansas State University)
| 121 | 12 | "Worm Grunter" | December 22, 2009 |
Clam harvester, worm grunter (Apalachicola National Forest)
| 122 | 13 | "Maple Syrup Maker" | December 29, 2009 |
Recycling used paint, maple syrup maker
| 123 | 14 | "Animal Control Specialist" | January 5, 2010 |
Animal control specialist trapping and releasing skunks, raccoons, and possums; viewer mail: revisit for dental inspection of moose ("Reindeer Farm")
| 124 | 15 | "Cricket Farmer" | January 12, 2010 |
Cricket farmer, viewer mail: revisit to feed turkeys ("Camel Rancher")
| 125 | 16 | "Chicken Busters" | January 19, 2010 |
Catching feral chickens, viewer mail: revisit to mealworm farm ("Cricket Farmer")
| 126 | 17 | "Soo Locks Technician" | January 26, 2010 |
Winter maintenance at Soo Locks
| 127 | 18 | "Concrete Finisher" | February 2, 2010 |
Making a fire pit, countertops, and bath tub out of decorative concrete; viewer mail: when was Mike most scared during a job? Monitoring leopard sharks and bat rays at Elkhorn Slough National Estuarine Research Reserve and not filming any sharks for Shark Week special
| 128 | 19 | "Bone Black" | February 9, 2010 |
Bone black manufacturer; (Maedel) twin sister fan's dirtiest jobs list: charcoal maker ("Micro-Algae Man"), coal miner ("Coal Miner"), disaster cleanup crew member ("Sewer Inspector"), cleaning the inside of the boilers of the steam yacht Medea ("Steam Ship Cleaner"), waste water sewage plant ("Turkey Farmer")
| 129 | 20 | "Tight Spaces 2" | February 16, 2010 |
Second revisit of jobs involving tight spaces: inspecting abandoned mineshaft ("Abandoned Mine Plugger"), concrete truck cleaner ("Termite Controller"), cleaning a buoy ("Buoy Cleaner"), cleaning grinder sump pump on fish processing ship ("Floating Fish Factory"), cleaning elevator shaft ("Dirty Jobs of the Big Apple"), aerial tram maintenance ("Aerial Tram Greaser"), inspecting the inside of a bowsprit ("Tar Rigger"), welding inside a rotary kiln ("Egg Farm"), cleaning inside of lauter tun ("Chick Sexers"), cleaning walnut cleaner ("Goose Down Plucker"), cleaning inside guar gum holding tank ("Aerial Tram Greaser"), changing main shaft packing on water turbine ("Rocky Reach Dam")
| 130 | 21 | "Crew Unemployment" | February 23, 2010 |
Behind the scenes focusing on the crew of Dirty Jobs
| 131 | 22 | "The Dirty Truth" | June 14, 2010 |
Discovery Channel 25th Anniversary special, revisit of 25 jobs with respect to lessons learned about jobs: potato farmer ("Turkey Farmer"), CowPots maker ("Poo Pot Maker"), salvaging truck from bottom of lake ("Ice Salvage Crew"), making a home energy efficient by improving insulation ("Turkey Inseminator"), blood worm digger ("Penguin Keeper"), removing chewing gum from sidewalks ("Pig Farmer"), breeding mosquitoes ("Mosquito Control Officer"), owl vomit collector ("Avian Vomitologist"), oyster shucker ("Rose Parade Float Dismantler"), boxing potato chips ("Dirty Chip Maker"), stacking bricks ("Cranberry Farmer"), sorting cloth diapers ("Diaper Cleaner"), baseball rubbing mud ("Bat Cave Scavenger"), large animal veterinarian ("Big Animal Vet"), crawfish trapper ("Shrimper"), fireworks maker ("Fireworks Technician"), logging with mules ("Mule Logger"), wine barrel maker ("Mule Logger"), shelling blue crab ("Vexcon"), catching feral chickens ("Chicken Busters"), castrating lambs with additional footage ("Sheep Castrator"), working on a dairy farm ("Dairy Cow Midwife"), cleaning up diesel spill ("Ice Salvage Crew"), transplanting a saguaro ("Maggot Farmer"), exterminator ("Vexcon")

=== Season 6 (2010–11) ===
| No. overall | No. in season | Title | Original release date |
|---|---|---|---|
| 132 | 1 | "Exotic Nanny" | October 19, 2010 |
Sharkarosa Wildlife Ranch: ring-tailed lemurs, porcupines, baby dromedary camel, baby albino eastern grey kangaroos, red kangaroos, wallabies, two-toed sloths, bearcat (brother of bearcat from "Exotic Animal Keeper")
| 133 | 2 | "Wetland Warrior" | October 26, 2010 |
Training with the Van Zandt County Bloodhound Team; managing the Melaleuca quinquenervia, a non-indigenous invasive species, at the Loxahatchee National Wildlife Refuge
| 134 | 3 | "Sea Lamprey Exterminator" | November 2, 2010 |
Assisting the United States Fish and Wildlife Service in exterminating sea lampreys from the Great Lakes region, making fish food for the Shark Reef at Mandalay Bay
| 135 | 4 | "Animal Relocator" | November 9, 2010 |
Working at water mill (Sciple's Water Mill), capturing two Père David's deer for transport
| 136 | 5 | "Lightning Rod Installer" | November 16, 2010 |
Lightning rod installer
| 137 | 6 | "Woolen Mill Operator" | November 21, 2010 |
Making fleece roving and yarn, Mike gives Dave Barsky a body wax
| 138 | 7 | "Pinsetter Mechanic" | November 23, 2010 |
Pinsetter mechanic, custom fitting for bowling ball, viewer question about Doug Glover in shark tank water filter (Shark Reef at Mandalay Bay)
| 139 | 8 | "Bug Detective" | November 28, 2010 |
Researchers at Purdue University's Forensic Entomology Research Compound
| 140 | 9 | "Horse Tester" | November 30, 2010 |
Evaluating equine nutrition at Kentucky Equine Research
| 141 | 10 | "Custom Meat Processor" | December 7, 2010 |
Seagull abatement specialist, mobile butcher
| 142 | 11 | "Dirty Holidays" | December 14, 2010 |
Revisit of jobs related to the holidays: baggage handler ("Cave Digger"), winemaker ("Wine Maker"), gourd maker ("Gourd Maker"), cranberry harvesting ("Cranberry Farmer"), turkey artificial insemination ("Turkey Inseminator"), turkey farmer ("Turkey Farmer"), goose tagging ("Wild Goose Chase"), reindeer farmer ("Reindeer Farm"), pipe organ specialist ("Geoduck Farmer"), camel ride ("Camel Rancher"), fireworks maker ("Fireworks Technician"), Rose Parade float dismantler ("Rose Parade Float Dismantler")
| 143 | 12 | "Dirty Conversations" | December 21, 2010 |
Revisit and additional footage of dirty conversations with guests, Carolyn and Marilyn Maedel, the twin sisters from Mackinac Island ("Bone Black"): cranberry jam maker ("Cranberry Farmer"), exterminators ("Vexcon"), mud shampoo maker ("Animal Barber"), bird food maker ("Spider Pharm"), alpaca spinner ("Alpaca Shearer"), goose down plucker ("Goose Down Plucker"), U. S. Army mechanic ("100th Dirty Job Special"), penguin keeper ("Penguin Keeper"), special effects artist ("Special Effects Artist"), bird wrangler ("Casino Food Recycler"), decorating designer ("Glass Maker"), cheese maker ("Cheese Maker"), toilet recycler ("Toilet Crusher"), barbecue chef ("Big Animal Vet"), avian vomitologist ("Avian Vomitologist"), slime eel separator ("Cave Biologist")
| 144 | 13 | "Date Palm Pollinator" | December 28, 2010 |
Viewer mail about Mike shooting guns, additional footage from Père David's deer capture ("Animal Relocator"); pollinating date palms; viewer mail about Mike's most frustrating moment, granite cutting
| 145 | 14 | "Asphalt Paver" | January 4, 2011 |
Asphalt road paving; viewer mail about Mike's favorite animal, ti-liger (a cross breed between a tiger and a liger)
| 146 | 15 | "Rum Distiller" | January 11, 2011 |
Rum distiller (Newport Distilling Company)
| 147 | 16 | "Hair Fairy" | January 18, 2011 |
Linemen replacing power pole, treating head lice
| 148 | 17 | "Dirty Infrastructure" | January 25, 2011 |
Revisit of jobs related to American Society of Civil Engineers's Report Card for America's Infrastructure: Effluent channel building cleaner at wastewater treatment plant ("Dirty Chip Maker"), sewer inspector ("Sewer Inspector"), sewage treatment plant lift pump ("Turkey Farmer"), disaster cleanup crew member ("Sewer Inspector"), Stamford hurricane barrier zinc anode changer ("Bell Maker"), winter maintenance at Soo Locks ("Soo Locks Technician"), changing oil on water turbine ("Rocky Reach Dam"), linemen replacing power pole ("Hair Fairy"), e-waste recycler ("Tofu Maker"), Mackinac Bridge maintenance worker ("Bridge Painter"), asphalt road paving ("Asphalt Paver"), cleaning airport runway paint striper ("Spray Insulation Technician"), gandy dancer ("Skull Cleaner")
| 149 | 18 | "Scrapple Maker" | February 1, 2011 |
Scrapple maker, shoeshiner
| 150 | 19 | "Blueberry Connoisseur" | February 8, 2011 |
Jelly bean maker (Jelly Belly), blueberry harvesting, handmade blueberry pie
| 151 | 20 | "Sponge Diver" | February 15, 2011 |
Sponge diver; viewer mail: what was Mike's hardest job? Removing a steel fence post from site of abandoned mine shaft ("Abandoned Mine Plugger")
| 152 | 21 | "Cedar Log Peeler" | February 22, 2011 |
Cleaning fish grinder on F/V Legacy ("Floating Fish Factory"), log cabin sawmill
| 153 | 22 | "Termite Researcher" | March 1, 2011 |
Twins Carolyn and Marilyn Maedel with additional footage at crawfish processing plant ("Shrimper"), University of Georgia termite researcher
| 154 | 23 | "Dirty DNA" | March 8, 2011 |
Revisit of jobs related to family with Mike visiting his parents: crab fisherman ("Vexcon"), maggot farmer ("Maggot Farmer"), leech trapping ("Leech Trapper"), candy maker ("Fuel Tank Cleaner"), coffee plantation ("Ostrich Farmer"), worm grunter ("Worm Grunter"), mealworm farm ("Cricket Farmer"), walnut harvester ("Goose Down Plucker"), bell maker ("Bell Maker"), raw meat dog food maker ("Leech Trapper"), goat milk soap maker ("Reef Ball Maker"), sponge diver ("Sponge Diver"), mobile butcher ("Custom Meat Processor")

=== Season 7 (2011–12) ===
| No. overall | No. in season | Title | Original release date |
|---|---|---|---|
| 155 | 1 | "Fish Squeezer" | December 13, 2011 |
Breeding walleye for recreational fishing, animal acupuncture
| 156 | 2 | "Fossil Hunter" | December 20, 2011 |
Excavating dinosaur fossil site with James Kirkland (Cedar Mountain Formation)
| 157 | 3 | "Doomsday Seed Banker" | December 27, 2011 |
Managing Myriophyllum spicatum, a non-indigenous invasive species, and collecting seeds for the Millennium Seed Bank Project at the Chicago Botanic Garden
| 158 | 4 | "Water Softener Technician" | January 3, 2012 |
Maintenance on water softening basin at municipal water treatment plant in Moorhead, Minnesota, cleaning coins at Westin St. Francis
| 159 | 5 | "Barber's Assistant" | January 10, 2012 |
Barbershop, landfill
| 160 | 6 | "Mardi Gras Bladder Banger" | January 17, 2012 |
Assembling cow bladders for the Knights of Revelry's Mardi Gras parade float in Mobile, Alabama
| 161 | 7 | "Medical Waste Disposal Expert" | January 24, 2012 |
Disposing biohazardous medical waste
| 162 | 8 | "Dirty Little Bits" | January 31, 2012 |
Outtakes from previous episodes
| 163 | 9 | "Tower Top Hand" | February 7, 2012 |
Erecting a 330-foot (100 m) radio communications tower in North Dakota, musical tribute to completing a dirty job in all 50 states
| 164 | 10 | "Onion Processor" | February 14, 2012 |
Commercial processing of onions, building wooden ladders for San Francisco Fire Department
| 165 | 11 | "Dirty Conversations 2" | February 21, 2012 |
Revisit and additional footage of dirty conversations hosted at the home of Bob Comes ("Pig Farmer"): jelly bean maker ("Blueberry Connoisseur"), handmade blueberry pie ("Blueberry Connoisseur"), shoeshiner ("Scrapple Maker"), treating head lice ("Hair Fairy"), dyeing shirts with red dirt from Kauai ("Marble Maker"), bird ringing common terns and Canada geese ("Abandoned Mine Plugger"), bird conservation ("Vomit Island Workers"), changing main shaft packing and oil on water turbine ("Rocky Reach Dam"), Mackinac Island horse manure and garbage removal/composting ("Wild Goose Chase"), twins Carolyn and Marilyn Maedel ("Dirty Conversations"), capturing two Père David's deer for transport ("Animal Relocator"), rum distiller ("Rum Distiller"), making vellum from goat skin ("Vellum Maker"), animal acupuncture ("Fish Squeezer"), barbershop ("Barber's Assistant"), crew member and guest quizzes ("Bug Detective", "Scrapple Maker", "Horse Tester", "Barber's Assistant")

=== Season 8: Dirty Jobs Down Under (2012) ===
| No. overall | No. in season | Title | Original release date |
|---|---|---|---|
| 166 | 1 | "Lost in Aboriginal Land" | August 22, 2012 |
Visiting the Aboriginal community of Yilpara in Arnhem Land.
| 167 | 2 | "Deadly Snake Wrangler" | August 29, 2012 |
Removing eastern brown snakes from residences in Adelaide, capturing cane toads with Graeme Sawyer, former Lord Mayor of the City of Darwin.
| 168 | 3 | "Journey to Croc Country" | September 5, 2012 |
Capturing saltwater crocodiles to study their diet with researchers from Crocodylus Park.
| 169 | 4 | "Outback Treasure Hunter" | September 12, 2012 |
Mining opal and maintaining the local golf course in Coober Pedy.

=== Dirty Jobs: Rowe'd Trip (2020) ===
| No. overall | No. in season | Title | Original release date | Viewers (millions) |
|---|---|---|---|---|
| 170 | 1 | "Dirty Infrastructure" | July 7, 2020 | 992,000 |
Mike Rowe and the crew tour the California coast in a recreational vehicle reminiscing about previous infrastructure related Dirty Jobs episodes. Mike interviews Kevin Reski, owner of Great Plains Towers in North Dakota who was in the 2012 episode titled "Tower Top Hand" and Lawrence Jackson III who is a sanitation worker in the San Francisco Chinatown district and was in the 2005 episode titled "Chinatown Garbage Collector".
| 171 | 2 | "Tight Spaces" | July 14, 2020 | 813,000 |
Mike Rowe and the crew tour the California coast in a recreational vehicle reminiscing about previous tight spaces related Dirty Jobs episodes.
| 172 | 3 | "Filthy Animals" | July 21, 2020 | 886,000 |
Mike Rowe and the crew tour the California coast in a recreational vehicle reminiscing about previous animal related Dirty Jobs episodes.
| 173 | 4 | "Problem Solvers" | July 28, 2020 | 747,000 |

=== Season 9 (2022) ===
| No. overall | No. in season | Title | Original release date | Viewers (millions) |
|---|---|---|---|---|
| 174 | 1 | "Rodbuster / Galvanizer" | January 2, 2022 | 863,000 |
Mike works his hardest construction job yet. He helps a team of rodbusters, who carry 2 tons of reinforced steel each for overpass construction. Next, Mike combats the ruination of rust by galvanizing infrastructural steel in an 850-degree zinc bath.
| 175 | 2 | "Jellyballer / Epoxy Installer" | January 9, 2022 | 841,000 |
Mike Rowe joins a fourth-generation fisherman's crew in Georgia as they harvest cannonball Jellyfish for food, a trade known as "Jellyballing." Then Mike helps a father-son team install epoxy flooring at a restaurant in time for the dinner rush.
| 176 | 3 | "Tugboat Fitter / Water Tower" | January 16, 2022 | 921,000 |
Mike visits a ship-building community in Coden, Alabama, to learn the ins-and-outs of building a tugboat, from tight spaces to complex algebra. Then he makes a long climb to the top of a dirty water tower in Magee, Mississippi, to clean inside the tank.
| 177 | 4 | "Rock Sucker / Mountain Carver" | January 23, 2022 | 798,000 |
Mike sucks rocks off an industrial roof with a massive vacuum. He then travels to the Black Hills to carve the largest monument in the world: Crazy Horse. Both stories involve several generations working together to pass on their life's ambitions.
| 178 | 5 | "Escalator Maintainer / Scorpion Sweeper" | January 30, 2022 | 577,000 |
Mike Rowe crams into a hockey arena's escalator where he scrapes and cleans a special kind of shmutz from the bottom. Then, he and a zoo keeper venture into the hot, treacherous Arizona desert at night to round up neurotoxic stinging scorpions.
| 179 | 6 | "Combat Surgeon / Iguana Hunter" | February 6, 2022 | 783,000 |
Mike Rowe trains as a trauma surgeon using hyper-realistic scenarios and specialized equipment to learn under simulated battlefield conditions. He then controls an invasive mess of iguanas which are posing health risks to humans on the Florida coast.

=== Season 10 (2022–23) ===
| No. overall | No. in season | Title | Original release date | Viewers (millions) |
|---|---|---|---|---|
| 180 | 1 | "Pool Fixer / Hotel Soap Recycler" | December 11, 2022 | N/A |
Mike heads to West Palm Beach, Florida to join a family business while they replace the vinyl liner in a swimming pool that has not been cleaned in 15 years. Then, Mike drives inland to Orlando, Florida, where he helps Clean The World recycle secondhand hotel soap that is distributed to people in need.
| 181 | 2 | "Feral Cat Fixer / Reaper Keeper" | December 18, 2022 | N/A |
Mike Rowe helps cat ladies of northern Texas to fix a clowder of feral cats at a spay/neuter facility. Mike feels the burn as he processes peppers with the mad scientist inventor of the Carolina Reaper, the hottest pepper in the world.
| 182 | 3 | "Pile Jacketer / Concrete Cleaner" | January 1, 2023 | N/A |
In an episode full of broken promises, Mike performs two jobs he has sworn off forever: diving and concrete. For his first gig, Mike finds a dilapidated bridge near Pensacola, Florida. Meeting a group of divers who find solutions to such problems, he hops waist-deep into the mucky river with them to reinforce the crumbling infrastructure. The day's work should add another 40 years onto the bridge's life. On his second job, Mike meets a crew of concrete fanatics in Charlotte, North Carolina. These guys willingly jump into a pit full of concrete washout. Their work - separating the solids and revitalizing the water.
| 183 | 4 | "Caviar Harvester / Spice Maker" | January 8, 2023 | N/A |
Mike goes for the waterways of America. First he heads to Clarksville, Missouri where he lends a hand onboard the Hillbilly Deluxe at catching shovelhead sturgeon to harvest Show-Me caviar. Part two of the episode has Mike at J.O. Spice Co. in Mike's hometown of Baltimore, Maryland. Here Mike rectifies an OLD mistake as he blends Maryland's most popular crab seasoning.
| 184 | 5 | "Baghouse Cleaner / Biochar Maker" | January 15, 2023 | N/A |
Mike finds himself in Charlotte, North Carolina, where there is a unique job at an asphalt plant. Mike joins the plant's crew for a Baghouse Party: cleaning out the massive filtration system (baghouse) keeping employees and the environment safe. Mike then helps an entrepreneur in Berthoud, Colorado turn useless, beetle-eaten timber into a resource with an intensely high carbon count and many beneficial uses.
| 185 | 6 | "Deer Urine Farmer / Necropsy" | January 22, 2023 | N/A |
In Anna, Illinois, Mike discovers feces from a new species as he collects and bottles the freshest farm-raised deer urine on the market sold to hunters looking to bag a buck. Near his hometown of Baltimore, in Oxford, Maryland, Mike dives elbow-deep into a recently deceased bottlenose dolphin as he assists in performing a necropsy to determine the cause of the creature's misfortune.
| 186 | 7 | "Manhole Rehab / Clock Caretaker" | January 29, 2023 | N/A |
Traveling below Murfreesboro, Tennessee, Mike descends into an aging manhole, stops the sewage, and sprays a life extending coating on the walls. Then, just down the street from The Capitol, Mike repairs one of the oldest working clocks in the country at a prep school in the nation's capital.
| 187 | 8 | "Beaver Relocator / Slime Master" | February 5, 2023 | N/A |
Mike saves municipal infrastructure and positively affects the local ecosystems as he traps, treats and relocates urban nuisance beavers back into the mountains of Utah. In Santa Fey Springs, California, Mike meets the folks behind the slime, yes THAT slime, and gets gooey with glue as he enters the world behind Hollywood's special effects.
