= Newport Craft Brewing & Distilling Company =

Brewery and distillery in Rhode Island, US

- Interactive map of Newport Craft Brewing & Distilling Company
- Location: Newport, Rhode Island, United States
- Coordinates: 41.5126804°N 71.3176496°W
- Opened: 1999 (as Coastal Extreme Brewing Company)
- Key people: Brendan O’Donnell (CEO); Brent Ryan (President, co-founder)
- Annual production volume: 100,000+ barrel annual capacity (2024)
- Owner: Audrain Hospitality Group (Heritage Restaurant Group)
- Distribution: Northeastern United States (New England)
- Website: newportcraft.com

Newport Craft Brewing & Distilling Company (often referred to as Newport Craft) is a brewery and distillery located in Newport, Rhode Island. Established in 1999 as the Coastal Extreme Brewing Company, it was the first microbrewery in Newport and began distilling operations in 2006. The company produces a range of beers and spirits that are distributed in the Northeastern United States. In 2018, it adopted its current name to reflect its combined brewing and distilling operations. Newport Craft is owned by Audrain Hospitality Group (also known as Heritage Restaurant Group), which owns and operates a portfolio of hospitality venues throughout Rhode Island. A major expansion project completed in 2024 increased production capacity and added new visitor facilities, including a taproom, outdoor spaces, and event areas.

== History ==
Coastal Extreme Brewing Company was established by four graduates of Colby College: Brent Ryan, Derek Luke, Mark Sinclair, and Will Rafferty. Rhode Island was chosen as the location because, at the time of opening, there were no other microbreweries in the state.

In 2006, Coastal Extreme Brewing Company expanded to create Newport Distilling Company, the first licensed in Rhode Island in over a century. In 2007, they began producing Thomas Tew Rum, named after Rhode Island's first pirate. Brent Ryan, President and CEO of Coastal Extreme, said that the production of rum is part of an effort to "resurrect the rum history of Newport."

In 2011, the brewery was featured in an episode of the show Dirty Jobs with Mike Rowe in which the brewery showed in detail how they produce and package their Thomas Tew rum.

In 2018, Coastal Extreme Brewing rebranded under the Newport Craft Brewing & Distilling Company name. At the same time, Brendan O'Donnell joined the company's management team as Chief Executive Officer.

== List of Cyclone Series beers ==
The Cyclone Series of beers are beers of varying types released by Coastal Extreme Brewing Company approximately every four months. Below is a list of all the Series to date. The names are in the style of the National Weather Service's naming of Tropical Storms where each letter of the alphabet is used as the first letter in each name and male and female names are alternated. Q and X are included in this series unlike the naming of the Tropical Storms. The one exception to the male and female alternation is the letter 'M' because Mark (named for a founder, Mark Sinclair) would have fallen on a female name. All names are someone either involved with the brewery or someone close to the brewers. The notable exceptions are Alyssa, Elle, Gloria, Isabel, Neo, Ophelia and Quinn.

Name	Type of Beer	IBU	ABV	SRM	Namesake
Alyssa	Brown Ale	33	8.1	83	Brent Ryan's beloved Porsche
Brent	Bock Lager	26	8.5	26	Founder and President, Brent Ryan
Chloe	Imperial Pale Ale	75	8.6	13	Niece of a brewer
Derek	Stout	61	8.7	235	Founder and Head Brewer, Derek Luke
Elle	Belgian Ale	16	8.1	20	"Sexy French Name"
Frank	Belgian White (Witbier)	7	6.8	13	Brewer at Coastal Extreme Brewing
Gloria	Pumpkin Ale	16	7.3	11.5	Hurricane Gloria of 1985
Henry	Dark Ale	20	7.6	39	Great Grandfather of a brewer at Coastal Extreme Brewing
Isabel	India Amber Ale	53	9	19	Hurricane Isabel of 2003
James	Strong Scotch Ale	20	8	22	Brewer at Coastal Extreme Brewing
Kim	Marzen Lager	19	7.8	20	Twin sister of founder, Brent Ryan
Luke	Indian Red Ale	65	8.6	28	Founder and Head Brewer, Derek Luke
Mark	Coffee Milk Stout	33	7	33	Founder, Mark Sinclair
Neo	Cascade Pale Ale	35	7	13	Neo from the Matrix
Ophelia	Peach Ale	20	5.9	25	Hurricane Ophelia of 2011
Peter	Spiced Ale	30	7.5	33	Distiller/Assistant Brewer at Coastal Extreme Brewing
Quinn	Barrel-Aged Porter	38	7	Unk	Dr. Quinn Medicine Woman Series
Ryan	Rye Pale Ale	48	8	21	Founder and President, Brent Ryan
Sabrina	Belgian Pale Ale	38	7.1	13	Daughter of founder Brent Ryan
Tim	Dunkelweiss	14	6.3	35	Friend of the Brewery
Ursula	North American Pale Lager	19	6.1	9	Sea Witch from The Little Mermaid
Vlad	Russian Imperial Stout	77	9	225	Employee chosen name
Will	West Coast IPA	89.5	8	21	Founder - Will Rafferty
Xavier	Sour Ale with Black Cherries (Berliner Weisse)	5	7	6	Employee chosen name
Yoko	Dark Ale with Toasted Coconut	45	7	105	Employee chosen name
Zach	Oatmeal Stout	47	10.1	251	Massachusetts sales representative

== Awards ==
2007 Annual Great International Beer Competition

- 3rd Place - Strong Beer: Other (Imperial Irish Stout)

2005 Annual Great International Beer Competition

- 1st Place - Amber & Dark Lager (Cyclone Series Brent)
- 3rd Place - Brown Ale (Cyclone Series Alyssa)
- 3rd Place - Porter (Bizzard Porter)

== Advertising ==
Taglines: "Newport Storm beers. Brewed in small batches—so every drop counts."

== See also ==
- Beer in the United States
- Barrel-aged beer
