= Corey Ivy =

American football player (born 1977)

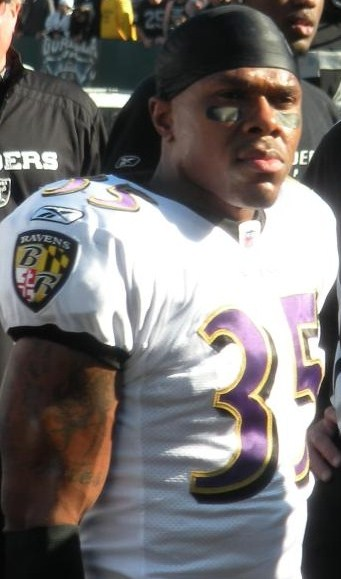
- Ivy with the Baltimore Ravens in 2010

No. 35
- Position: Cornerback

Personal information
- Born: March 21, 1977 (age 49); St. Louis, Missouri, U.S.
- Listed height: 5 ft 9 in (1.75 m)
- Listed weight: 183 lb (83 kg)

Career information
- High school: Moore (OK)
- College: Northeastern Oklahoma A&M (1995–1996); Oklahoma (1997–1998)
- NFL draft: 1999: undrafted

Career history
- New England Patriots (1999)*; Frankfurt Galaxy (2000); Cleveland Browns (2000)*; Chicago Enforcers (2001); Tampa Bay Buccaneers (2001–2004); →Frankfurt Galaxy (2004); St. Louis Rams (2005); Baltimore Ravens (2006–2008); Cleveland Browns (2009)*; Pittsburgh Steelers (2009); Baltimore Ravens (2009); Omaha Nighthawks (2010)
- * Offseason or practice squad member only

Awards and highlights
- Super Bowl champion (XXXVII)

Career NFL statistics
- Total tackles: 280
- Sacks: 9.5
- Forced fumbles: 5
- Fumble recoveries: 3
- Interceptions: 3
- Stats at Pro Football Reference

Corey Terrell Ivy (born March 21, 1977) is an American former professional American football player who was a cornerback in the National Football League (NFL), XFL, and United Football League (UFL). He was signed by the New England Patriots as an undrafted free agent in 1999. He played college football at Oklahoma.

Ivy was also a member of the Frankfurt Galaxy, Chicago Enforcers, Tampa Bay Buccaneers, St. Louis Rams, Cleveland Browns, Baltimore Ravens, Pittsburgh Steelers, and Omaha Nighthawks. He earned a Super Bowl ring with the Buccaneers in Super Bowl XXXVII, beating the Oakland Raiders.

== Early life ==
He attended Moore High School in Moore, Oklahoma.

== College career ==
Ivy played college football at Northeastern Oklahoma A&M College and the University of Oklahoma. He finished his career with 69 tackles and four interceptions. He majored in sociology.

== Professional career ==
=== New England Patriots ===
Ivy was originally selected by the New England Patriots as an undrafted rookie free agent on May 11, 1999. He spent most of his time on the practice squad but never saw any active playing time. In 2000, he played for the Frankfurt Galaxy.

=== First stint with Browns ===
On July 12, 2000, he was signed by the Cleveland Browns and was part of their training camp before being waived on August 27.

=== Chicago Enforcers ===
Playing for the Chicago Enforcers in 2001, Ivy lead the XFL in interceptions in the league's first year of existence.

=== Tampa Bay Buccaneers ===
Ivy was signed by the Tampa Bay Buccaneers on June 4, 2001. He made his NFL debut at the Detroit Lions on November 11 and recorded six tackles. In 2002, he played in all 16 regular season games and three postseason games and was a member of the victorious Super Bowl XXXVII team. The following season, he again played in all 16 contests and finished the season with 17 tackles. In 2004, he played in all 16 games for the third season running posting 17 special teams tackles.

=== St. Louis Rams ===
Corey Ivy signed for the St. Louis Rams on May 2, 2005. In his only season with the team he played in all 16 games and recorded a career-high 57 tackles and two sacks.

=== First stint with Baltimore Ravens ===
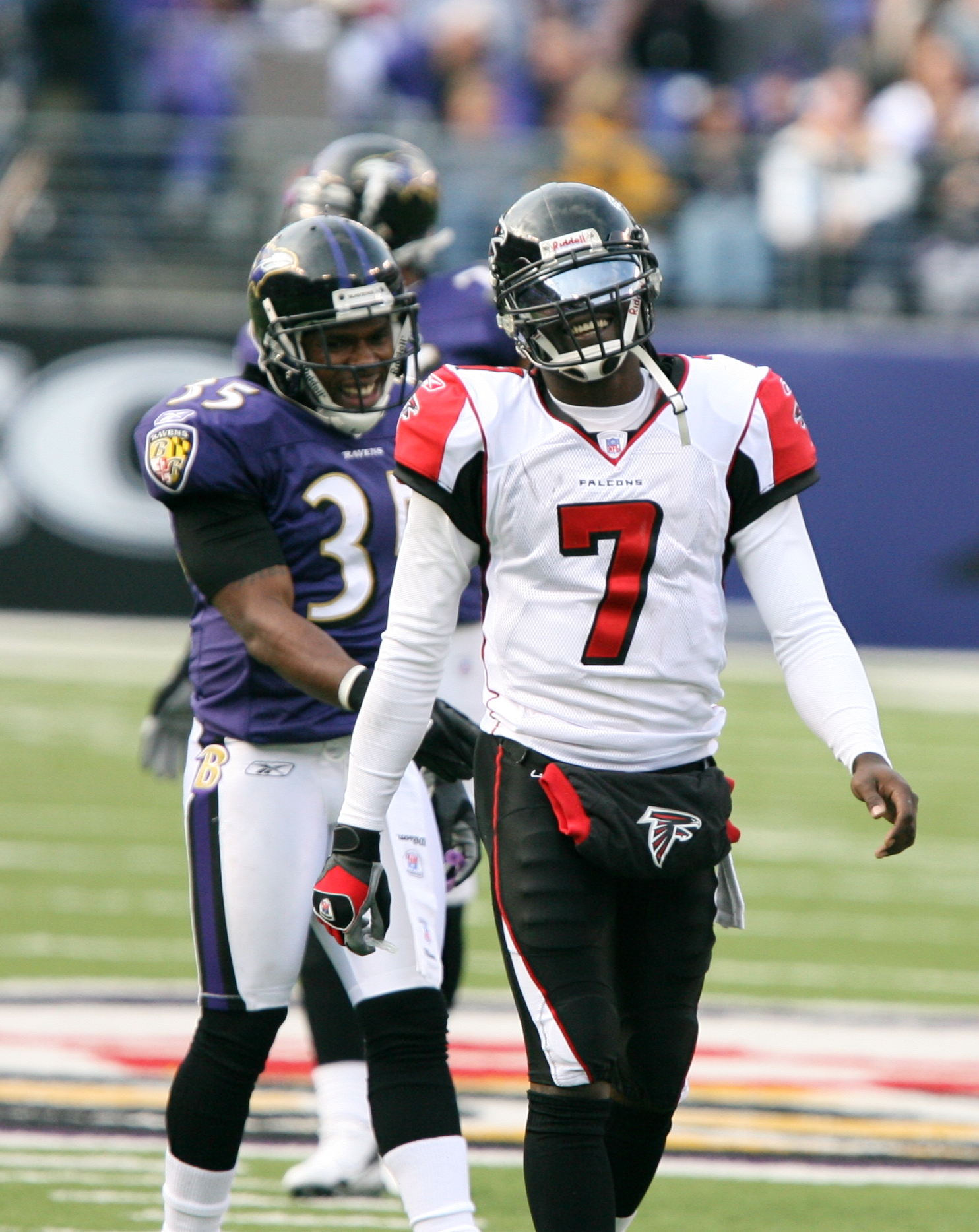
Ivy and Michael Vick in 2006.

On March 23, 2006, Corey Ivy signed a three-year deal with the Baltimore Ravens. He had a great season playing on special teams and nickelback for the top ranked Baltimore defense. His best game was against the Steelers where he had an interception, a sack, and a forced fumble that was recovered for a touchdown by Adalius Thomas in a win. It was also his first game back from a kidney injury against the Denver Broncos which he was told would end his season but he only missed 2 games. His injury earned him the Ed Block Courage Award. The injury is well documented because on the plane ride back from Denver the Ravens had to make an emergency stop for Ivy in Pittsburgh. During an interview with BaltimoreRavens.com after receiving the award Ivy said that FS Ed Reed was the person who got the doctor while on the plane. Ivy followed that with a strong 2007 but in 2008, the final year of his contract, Ivy saw his role decrease. Following the season, The Ravens let several veteran corners go, including Ivy. But Ivy's first stint with the Baltimore Ravens was arguably the most successful stay of his career.

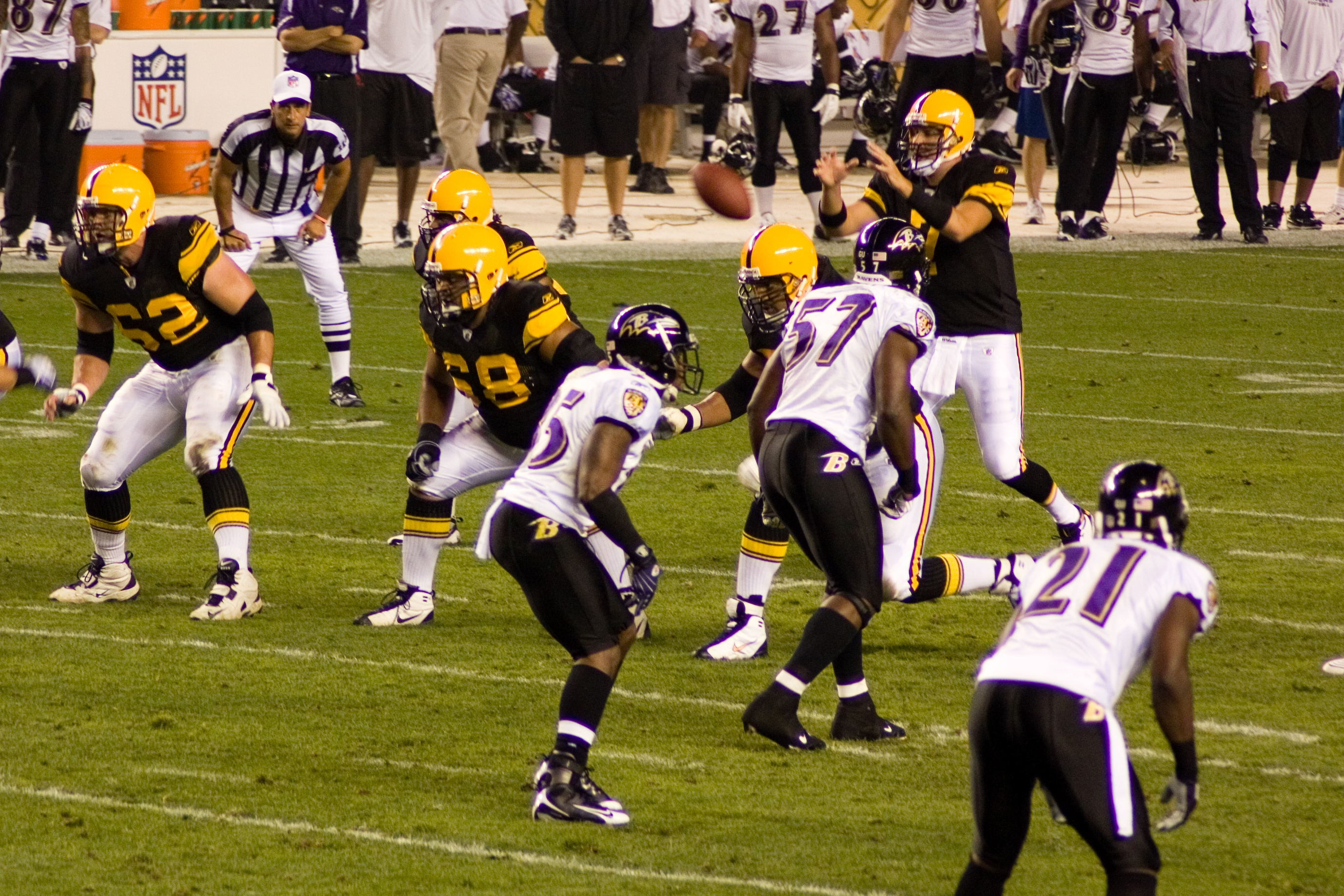
Ivy (35) playing against the Pittsburgh Steelers in 2008. Ivy is crouching behind Bart Scott, who is wearing #57. Chris McAlister is #21.

=== Second stint with Browns ===
An unrestricted free agent in the 2009 offseason, Ivy signed with the Cleveland Browns on March 18. He was cut from the team during final cuts on September 5, 2009.

=== Pittsburgh Steelers ===
Ivy was signed by the Pittsburgh Steelers on November 24, 2009, after cornerback Keiwan Ratliff was waived. On December 2, the Steelers released Ivy. He did not record a statistic.

=== Second stint with Ravens ===
Corey Ivy was re-signed by the Baltimore Ravens on December 22, 2009, after cornerback Ladarius Webb was placed on injured reserve and just before a game against the rival Steelers. “I’m familiar with the coaches and the players here,” said Ivy. “I’ll need to get up to speed with the ins and outs of the defense. I’m thinking that not much has really changed. The defense is still playing at a high level, and I want to contribute to that.” He recorded one tackle in two regular season games but an illegal contact penalty on him caused an Ed Reed interception to be negated in a playoff loss to the Indianapolis Colts. Ivy was not re-signed.

=== Omaha Nighthawks ===
Ivy was signed by the Omaha Nighthawks of the United Football League on September 26, 2010. He appeared in seven games, recording 17 tackles.
