= Museum of Osteology =

Museum in Oklahoma City, U.S.

Skeletons: Museum of Osteology (Oklahoma City)
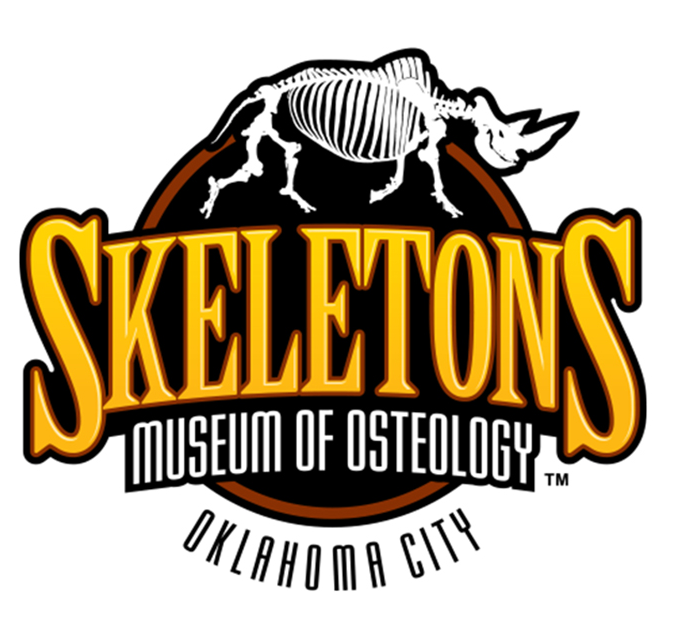

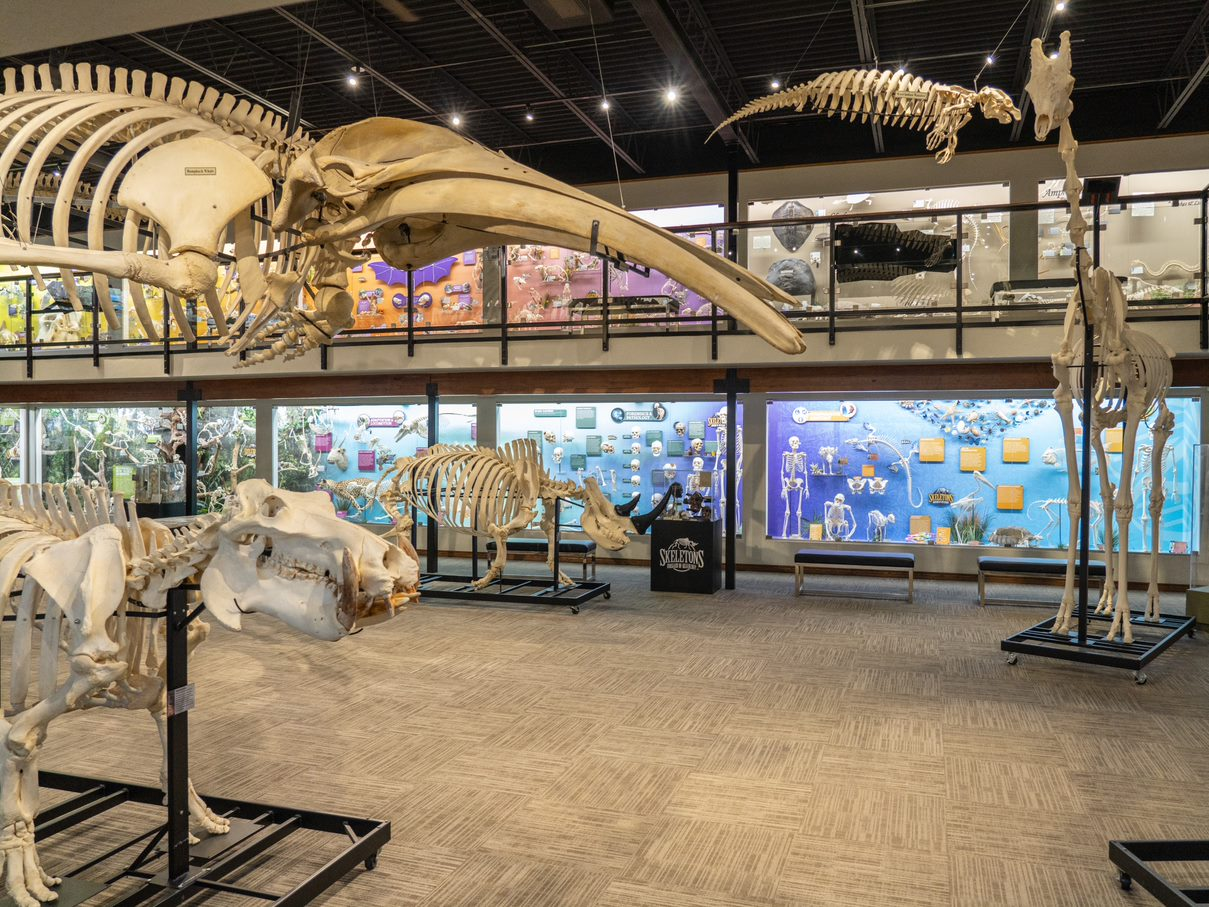
- The museum in 2022
- Established: 2010; 16 years ago
- Location: Oklahoma City, United States
- Coordinates: 35.3654°N 97.4426°W
- Type: Natural history museum
- Collection size: 7,000+ skeletal specimens
- Visitors: 500,000+
- Director: Jay Villemarette
- Owner: Jay Villemarette
- Website: skeletonmuseum.com

The Museum of Osteology, located in Oklahoma City, U.S., is a private museum devoted to the study of bones and skeletons (osteology). The museum displays over 450 skeletons of animal species from all over the world. With another 7,000 specimens as part of the collection, but not on display, it is the largest privately held collection of osteological specimens in the world. The museum is an entity of its parent company, Skulls Unlimited International.

== Overview ==
The museum focuses on the form and function of the skeletal system, with numerous educational and taxonomic displays featuring all five classes of vertebrates. The collections housed by the Museum of Osteology are the result of over 40 years of collecting by Jay Villemarette.

The museum hosts educational events targeted towards all age groups. Museum guests also have the opportunity to touch bones and take pictures with fully articulated skeletons.

== History ==
Jay Villemarette, founder of the company Skulls Unlimited International, Inc., established the museum alongside his family. Skulls Unlimited's offices and processing facilities are located next to the museum. Construction of the museum began in 2004, and it opened to the public on October 1, 2010. Villemarette created the museum with the goal of displaying his collection and making osteology more accessible to the public. In 2015, the Museum of Osteology opened a second location in Orlando, Florida. In 2020, the Florida location closed, and the collections were combined.

== Exhibits ==
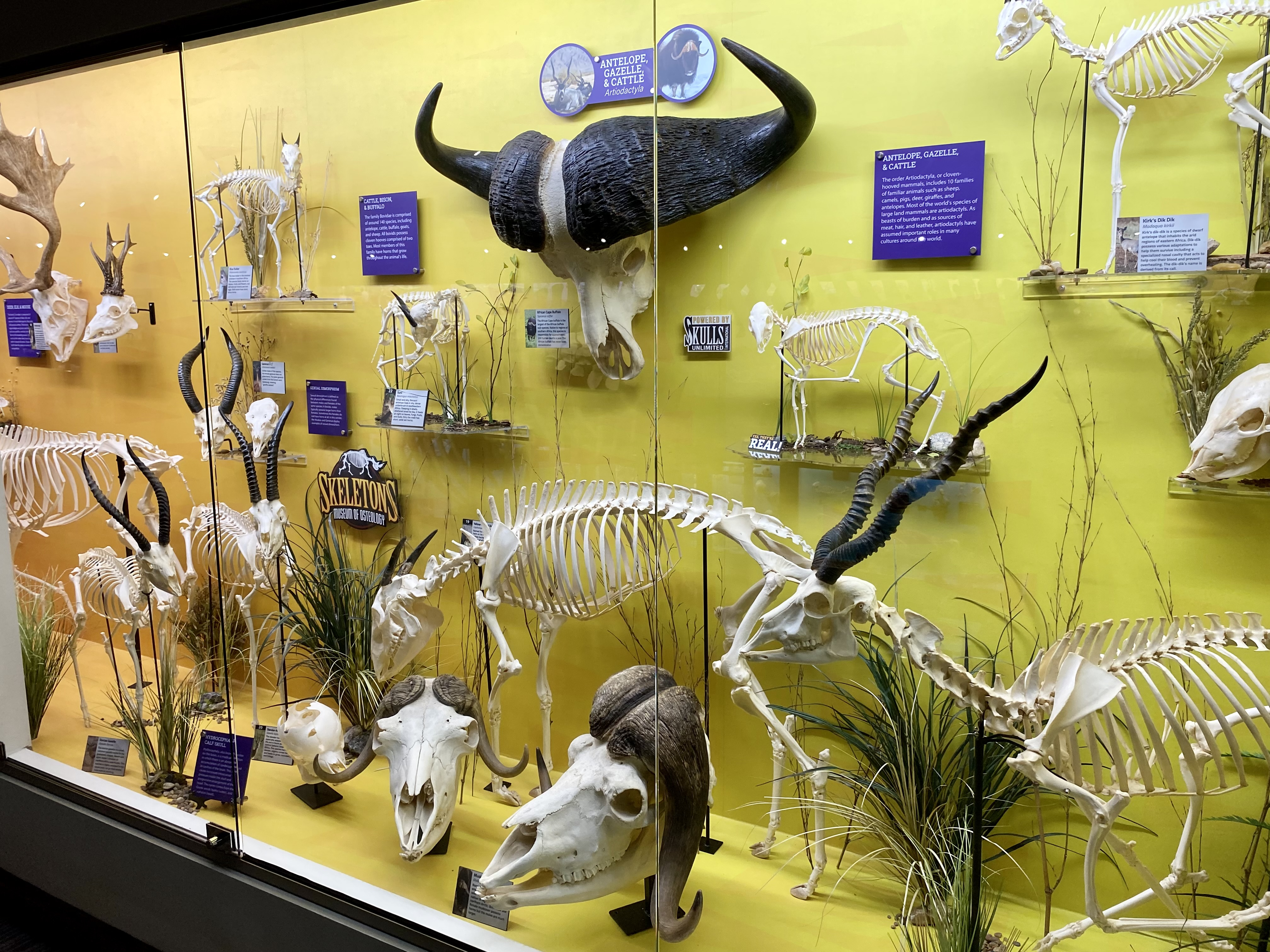
The artiodactyl exhibit at the museum

The museum offers many exhibits from all five vertebrate classes. Floating exhibits are available throughout the museum, with whale skeletons hanging from the ceiling. All the specimens on display are cleaned at the Skulls Unlimited building next door, using dermestid beetles before being articulated and then put on display. The exhibits display a wide range of topics, including locomotion, adaptation, and forensic osteology and pathology. The museum also offers scavenger hunts and activities aimed at children and parents.

The Museum of Osteology partners with zoos, aquaria, wildlife centers, nature preserves, sport hunters, and private donors to source its specimens. The museum also displays human skeletons that have been donated to science and purchased by the museum.

== Notable specimens ==
- Humpback whale – One of twelve fully-articulated skeletons in North America, it washed ashore in 2003, was buried for two years, and then cleaned by Skulls Unlimited International. The whale was featured on an episode of Mike Rowe's Dirty Jobs, titled "Skull Cleaner", where Rowe helped clean the skeleton.
- Javan rhino – This is the rarest specimen in the collection.
- Cetacean collection – The museum houses the largest private collection of cetacean skeletons, including whales, dolphins, and porpoises. The collection at the museum holds 46 different species.

== Reception ==
The museum has faced criticism for displaying human remains that have been donated to science. Speaking on the topic of body donation in the United States, John Oliver criticized the museum for displaying human bones in ways that the donors may have not intended, saying, "When most people think about donating their bodies to science, they picture it in a reputable educational institution, not in some roadside bone collection, face-down, ass-up, arranged in a formation best described as a Cirque du Soleil performer's favorite sex position".
