= Billy the Exterminator =

American reality television series

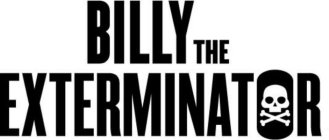
- Also known as: The Exterminators (2009) & Billy Goes North (2016)
- Genre: Reality
- Starring: Billy Bretherton; Ricky Bretherton; Donnie Bretherton "Big Bill" Bretherton
- Country of origin: United States
- Original language: English
- No. of seasons: 7
- No. of episodes: 100 (plus two specials) (list of episodes)

Production
- Production locations: Benton, LA
- Running time: 30 minutes (including commercials)
- Production company: September Films

Original release
- Network: A&E
- Release: February 4, 2009 – June 6, 2017

Related
- Dirty Jobs; Duck Dynasty

Billy the Exterminator (formerly The Exterminators) is an American reality television series that aired on A&E.

The show followed the professional life of William "Billy" Bretherton, an entomologist, pest control technician, and the proprietor of Vexcon Animal and Pest Control in Benton, Louisiana, which serves the Shreveport-Bossier metropolitan area. Bretherton, a former Senior Airman in the United States Air Force, had previously been featured on the Discovery Channel's Dirty Jobs series on the season 1 episode "Vexcon", and the season 2 episode "Termite Controller". Both previously and in his current show, Bretherton is known for his unusual fashion style, consisting mostly of Goth-like black garments (many of them leather) with large silver jewelry and steel studs and spikes in various configurations. He has stated on camera that the leather is tough enough to block most bites and stings, while the studs/spikes serve to intimidate animals and make them reluctant to attack him.

Many members of Bretherton's family, such as his parents, "Big" Bill and Donnie, and his brother, Ricky, as well as other employees, make frequent appearances. Donnie Bretherton normally acts as Vexcon's dispatcher and rarely goes out on jobs. Ricky's ex-wife, Pam, resigned during the production of the first season.

As noted in many episodes, Bretherton prefers, if at all possible, to relocate captured animals and is a proponent of natural methods of control. He frequently gives a description of the pests, their preferred environment, and any diseases (usually using their Latin names) associated with them. Ricky Bretherton acquired an allergy to bee and wasp stings due to being stung so many times. However Ricky found that this allergy has somewhat vanished/subsided as of 2015.

Billy Bretherton entered the United States Air Force at age nineteen intent on a career in law enforcement. However, his military entrance examination indicated that he had an aptitude for biology, and he was sent to study both biology and entomology. His extermination career began in earnest while stationed at Nellis Air Force Base in North Las Vegas, Nevada.

== Show history ==
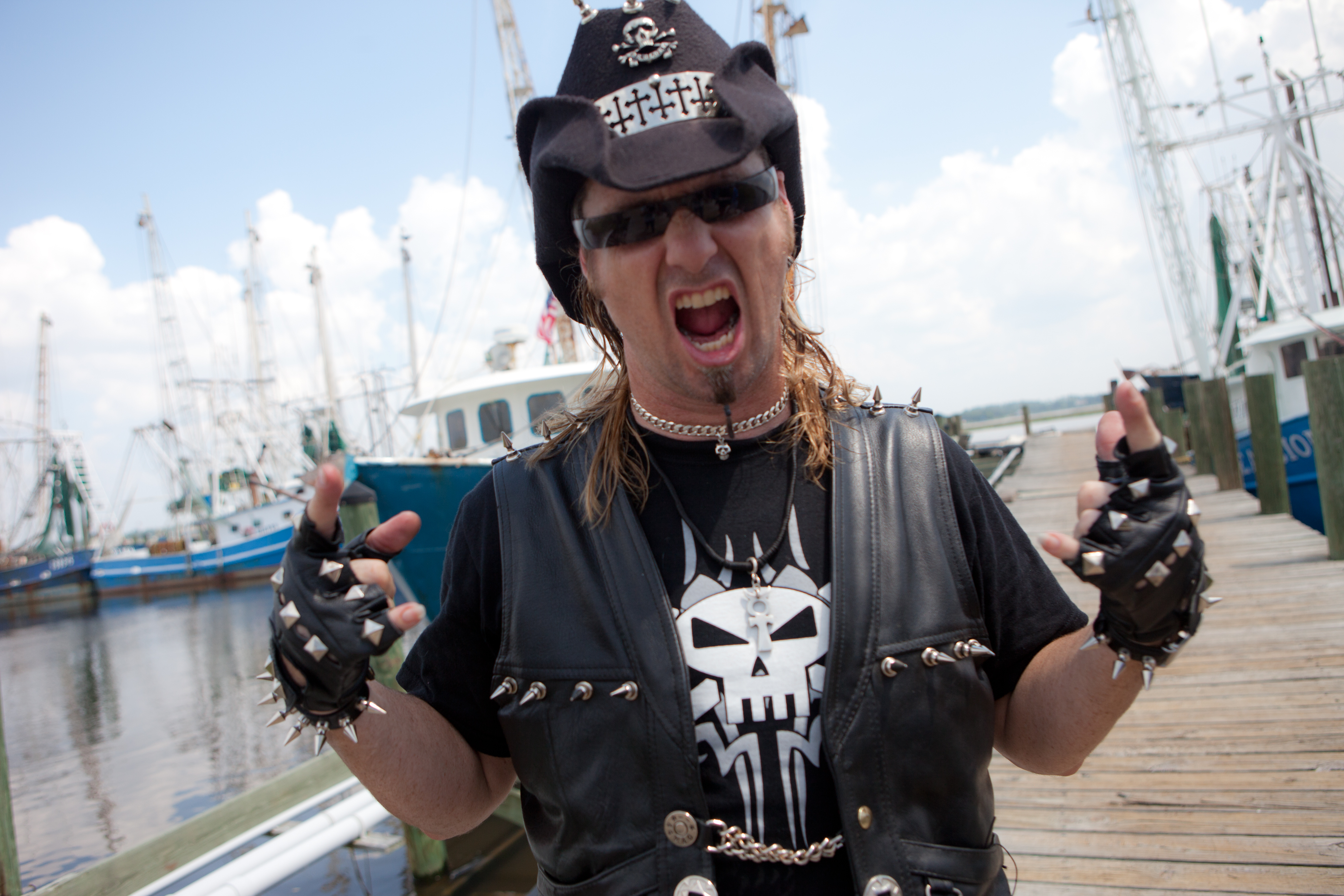
Billy Bretherton, presenter of Billy the Exterminator

"Back in 2004 Pilgrim Films contacted us and wanted to shoot a pilot for Discovery Channel (that was a) reality pest control show", said Bretherton. "They had interviewed about 200 different companies and found us and liked us. They sent scouts out that rode around with us for a day, made the determination that we would be good for filming, and we ended up on Dirty Jobs with Mike Rowe". The Spike network was also approached about picking up the series.

Originally called The Exterminators during its first season in 2009 on A&E, the show was renamed Billy the Exterminator before the second season. The title change is reflected in repeats of season one episodes.

Beginning in the show's fourth season, the Bretherton brothers go to various places throughout the United States to assist with local exterminators and wildlife rescue services in the removal of local vermin and wildlife, in addition to tending to a few jobs back in Louisiana. The program's opening credits have also been redone to better reflect Bretherton's attitude; the new credits omit Bretherton's wife, Mary, who resigned during the show's first season.

The show's fifth season ran from February 11, 2012 to March 10, 2012, with two new episodes on Saturdays at 10PM ET. The show's sixth season began October 6, 2012, in the same timeslot. On December 15, 2012, the show's sixth season timeslot moved one hour ahead to 11PM ET.

In late 2012, Bretherton left Vexcon because of personal family issues and moved to Illinois; officially ending the show after six seasons.

In October 2015, Billy's brother Ricky started hosting a YouTube series titled Vexcon The Exterminators.

In 2016, Corus Entertainment and Proper Television began airing an original series starring Billy Bretherton for CMT in Canada titled Billy Goes North. The show premiered in the United States on April 5, 2017 as the seventh season of Billy The Exterminator.

In 2020 Billy's brother Ricky started airing season 2 of his web series on YouTube, now featuring Billy and Billy’s son Bryce as reoccurring cast members.

In 2021 Billy's son Bryce started a TikTok account that features Billy and Ricky as frequent guests. As of October 2023 the account "@brycebretherton" has amassed 153,100 followers.

== Vexcon team ==
- Billy Bretherton
- Ricky Bretherton: Billy's brother
- William "Big Bill" Bretherton: Father of Billy and Ricky
- Donnie Bretherton: Big Bill's wife, and the mother of Billy and Ricky
- Mary Bretherton: Billy’s wife

== Recurring assistants ==
- "Gator" Dave Wilson - Licensed Gator Hunter
- "Danger" Dave Milliken - Animal Control Officer
- "Killy" Kim Link
- "Doc" Jim Holmes

== Episodes ==
Season	Episodes	Originally released			DVD release date (Note: In Region 1)
Season	Episodes	First released	Last released	Network	DVD release date
1	13	February 4, 2009	April 29, 2009	A&E	December 21, 2010
2	20	March 10, 2010	July 21, 2010	A&E	December 21, 2010
3	16	October 5, 2010	December 14, 2010	A&E	June 28, 2011
4	12	August 2, 2011	September 13, 2011	A&E	April 24, 2012
5	11	February 11, 2012	March 10, 2012	A&E	March 7, 2014
6	16	October 6, 2012	December 22, 2012	A&E	TBA
7	12	September 9, 2016	November 25, 2016	CMT Canada	TBA

== DVD releases ==
There have been four seasons of the show released on DVD. Season five is available on instant video online.

DVD name	No. of episodes	Run time (minutes)	Release
Billy the Exterminator Season One	13	286	December 21, 2010
Billy the Exterminator Season Two	21	487	December 21, 2010
Billy the Exterminator Season Three	17	397	June 28, 2011
Billy the Exterminator Season Four	12	256	April 24, 2012
Billy the Exterminator Season Five	11	400	March 7, 2014
