= Jay Villemarette =

Founder, president and CEO of Skulls Unlimited International, Inc

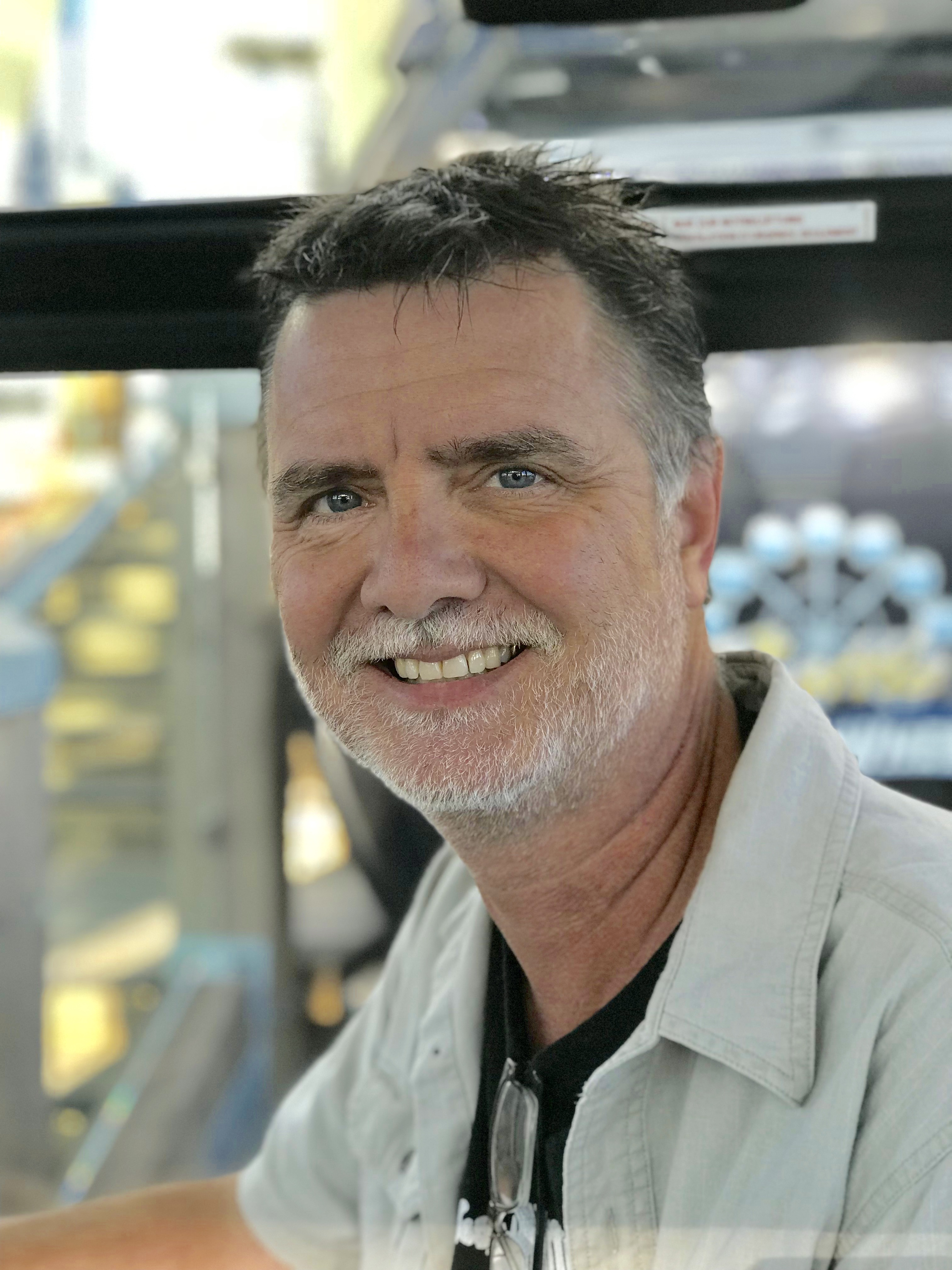
- Villemarette in 2018
- Occupation: Entrepreneur
- Title: Founder, president and CEO of Skulls Unlimited International, Inc. and the Museum of Osteology
- Spouse(s): Kim Villemarette (m. 1985)
- Children: 4
- Website: skeletonmuseum.com skullsunlimited.com

Jay Villemarette (pronounced /ˈvɪləmərɛt/) is the owner, founder and president of both Skulls Unlimited International and the Museum of Osteology.

== Early life ==
His interest in skulls began in 1972 at 7 years of age, when he found a dog skull in the woods near his house in Levittown, Pennsylvania. With encouragement from his father, he began collecting skulls, and continued his hobby after moving to Moore, Oklahoma. As his interest grew, neighbors and friends began bringing him carcasses of animals that they had found. During this time, he tested many methods of removing the soft tissue from the bones, including burning, acid, and boiling the bones, before using dermestid beetles. Villemarette graduated from Moore High School before attending Moore-Norman Technology Center in Entrepreneurship. Before founding Skulls Unlimited, he worked as an auto-body mechanic.

== Career ==
=== Skulls Unlimited International ===
After finishing high school, Villemarette began cleaning and selling skulls as a side job. After losing his job as a mechanic, he decided to try selling skulls as a full-time occupation. He began by creating a printed list of skulls for sale in 1985. In 1986, Skulls Unlimited was founded as a provider of osteological specimens. Jay's sons and nephew also work for Skulls Unlimited International.

Skulls Unlimited International source and process animal carcasses before sale. This process begins with removing the majority of the soft tissue from the carcasses by hand. Then two methods are used to detail clean the skulls: dermestid beetles and maceration. After that, skulls are whitened with hydrogen peroxide and articulated by running hardware through the bones.

=== Museum of Osteology ===
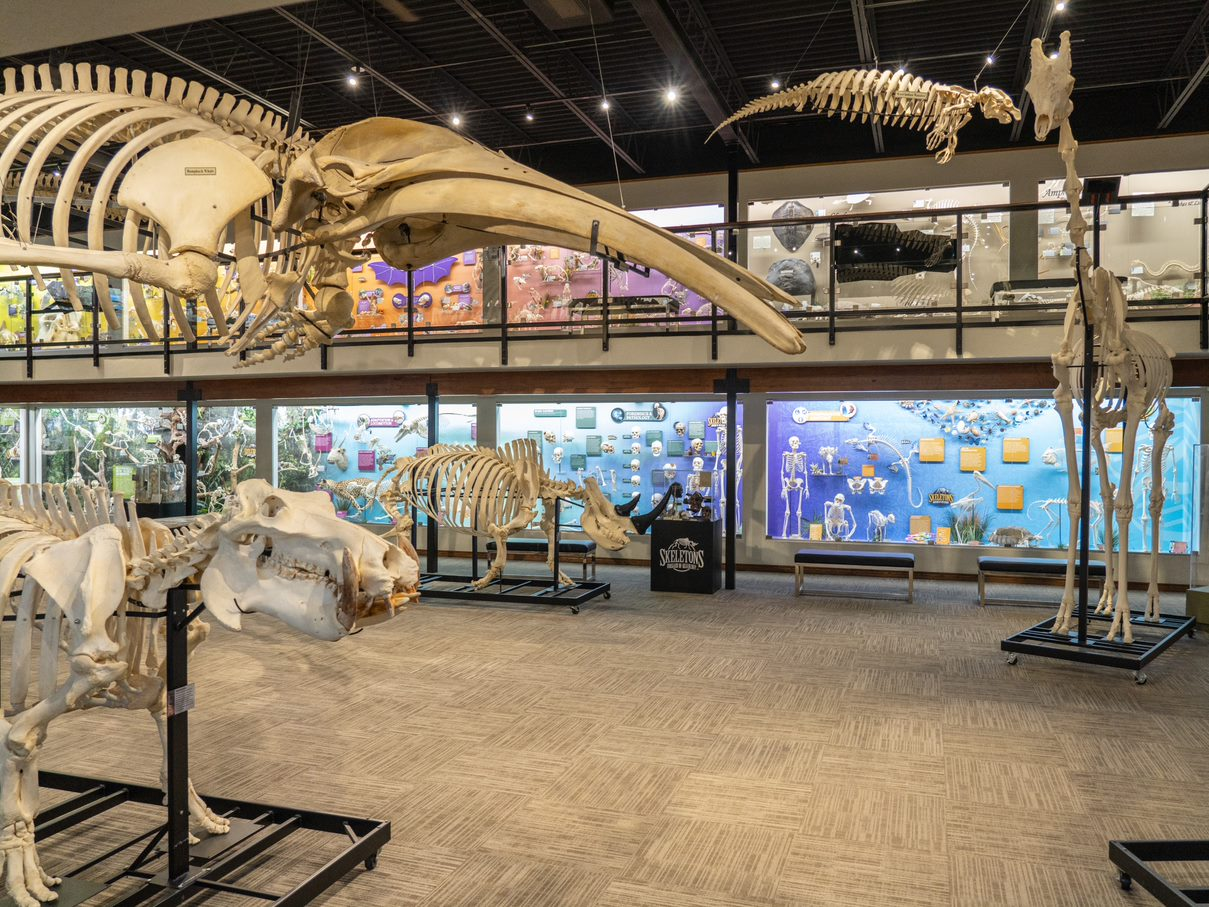
The Museum of Osteology in 2022.

In 2010, Villemarette opened the Museum of Osteology in Oklahoma City, which holds over 300 skeletons on display, including the skeletons of animals such as a humpback whale and the skull of a rare Javan rhinoceros. Villemarette developed the museum primarily in hopes of it being utilized as an educational tool. The Museum of Osteology shares its space with Skulls Unlimited International's business office and is adjacent to the processing center.

After success of the Oklahoma City museum, Villemarette opened a second, larger site in Orlando, Florida in May 2015. Villemarette considered other locations for his second museum, including Las Vegas, before deciding on Orlando. The Florida museum closed in 2020, and its collection was combined with that of the Oklahoma museum.

== Personal life ==
Villemarette met his wife, Kim Villemarette, when they were in high school. They married in 1985. Together they have 4 children, three sons and a daughter. All of Villemarette's sons are involved with the business and all of his children have participated in processing carcasses for the company from a young age.
