= List of Billy the Exterminator episodes =

This is the list of episodes from Billy the Exterminator.

== Series overview ==
Season	Episodes	Originally released			DVD release date (Note: In Region 1)
Season	Episodes	First released	Last released	Network	DVD release date
1	13	February 4, 2009	April 29, 2009	A&E	December 21, 2010
2	20	March 10, 2010	July 21, 2010	A&E	December 21, 2010
3	16	October 5, 2010	December 14, 2010	A&E	June 28, 2011
4	12	August 2, 2011	September 13, 2011	A&E	April 24, 2012
5	11	February 11, 2012	March 10, 2012	A&E	March 7, 2014
6	16	October 6, 2012	December 22, 2012	A&E	TBA
7	12	September 9, 2016	November 25, 2016	CMT Canada	TBA

== Episodes ==
=== Season 1 (2009) ===
No. overall	No. in season	Title	Original release date
1	1	"Goth Bees / Killer Coons"	February 4, 2009
2	2	"Snake in The Closet"	February 11, 2009
3	3	"There's a Gator in My Boat"	February 18, 2009
4	4	"Kitty Corpse Cleanup"	February 25, 2009
5	5	"Gator Park Swarm"	March 4, 2009
6	6	"Possums in the Wall"	March 11, 2009
7	7	"Llama-Eating Gators"	March 18, 2009
8	8	"Psycho Raccoon / Killer Spiders"	March 25, 2009
9	9	"Raccoon Haunting"	April 1, 2009
10	10	"Tattoo Rattlesnake"	April 8, 2009
11	11	"Bobcat Invasion"	April 15, 2009
12	12	"Extreme Roaches / Busy Beaver"	April 22, 2009
13	13	"Skunks and Mice and Snakes Oh My"	April 29, 2009

=== Season 2 (2010) ===
No. overall	No. in season	Title	Original release date
14	1	"Funeral Home Snake"	March 10, 2010
15	2	"Attack of the Trash Can Raccoon"	March 17, 2010
16	3	"Snake Invader"	March 24, 2010
17	4	"Backyard Gator"	March 31, 2010
18	5	"Nursery Room Raccoon"	April 7, 2010
19	6	"Extreme Gator"	April 14, 2010
20	7	"Snakes in the Swamp"	April 21, 2010
21	8	"Bee Relocation"	April 28, 2010
22	9	"Bobcat & Yellow Jacket"	May 5, 2010
23	10	"Raccoon Rescue"	May 5, 2010
24	11	"Spider Invasion"	May 12, 2010
25	12	"Attack of the 15 Foot Snake"	June 2, 2010
26	13	"Squirrels in the Attic""	June 2, 2010
27	14	"Rattlesnake Combat"	June 9, 2010
28	15	"Bat Attack"	June 16, 2010
29	16	"Deadly Snake on the Loose"	June 23, 2010
SP1	TBA	"Billy Goes to The Gulf (one-hour episode)"	June 28, 2010
30	17	"9 Foot Gator"	June 30, 2010
31	18	"When Squirrels Attack"	July 7, 2010
32	19	"Sprayed by a Skunk"	July 14, 2010
33	20	"Python on the Prowl"	July 21, 2010

=== Season 3 (2010) ===
No. overall	No. in season	Title	Original release date
34	1	"Coffin of Deadly Reptiles"	September 28, 2010
35	2	"Donnie's Snake Attack"	September 28, 2010
36	3	"Fox Fight!"	October 5, 2010
37	4	"Invasion of the Giant Rats"	October 5, 2010
38	5	"Snakes in a Pool"	October 12, 2010
39	6	"Bees from Hell"	October 12, 2010
40	7	"Donnie Gets Dirty"	October 19, 2010
41	8	"Wolf Attack"	October 19, 2010
42	9	"Five Alarm Hive"	October 26, 2010
43	10	"Gator Bait"	November 2, 2010
44	11	"Raccoon Rampage"	November 9, 2010
45	12	"Snake Bite!"	November 16, 2010
46	13	"Battle of the Bees"	November 23, 2010
47	14	"Monster Mice"	November 30, 2010
48	15	"Hogs Gone Wild!"	December 7, 2010
49	16	"Hole of Horror"	December 14, 2010
SP2	TBA	"The Best of Billy (one-hour clip episode)"	December 21, 2010

=== Season 4 (2011) ===
No. overall	No. in season	Title	Location	Original release date
50	1	"When Gators Attack"	Beaumont, Texas	August 2, 2011
51	2	"Desert Destroyers"	Phoenix, Arizona	August 2, 2011
52	3	"What Lurks Beneath"	Beaumont, Texas; Miami, Florida	August 9, 2011
53	4	"Furry Infestation"	Chicago, Illinois	August 9, 2011
54	5	"Aerial Attack"	Charlotte, North Carolina	August 16, 2011
55	6	"Bobcat Battle"	Shreveport, Louisiana	August 16, 2011
56	7	"Suck It Up"	Miami, Florida	August 23, 2011
57	8	"Dirty Rat"	Shreveport, Louisiana	August 23, 2011
58	9	"Good Morning Gators"	Savannah, Georgia	August 30, 2011
59	10	"Skunks on a Plane"	Shreveport, Louisiana	August 30, 2011
60	11	"Hoarder House Rats"	Shreveport, Louisiana	September 6, 2011
61	12	"Gators in Waiting"	Savannah, Georgia	September 13, 2011

=== Season 5 (2012) ===
No. overall	No. in season	Title	Location	Original release date
62	1	"Python Power"	Shreveport, Louisiana	February 11, 2012
63	2	"Aggravated Assault"	New Orleans, Louisiana	February 11, 2012
64	3	"Mission Impossible"	New Orleans, Louisiana	February 18, 2012
65	4	"Swarm of the Angry Bees"	New Orleans, Louisiana	February 18, 2012
66	5	"Giant Rats in the City"	Chicago, Illinois	February 25, 2012
67	6	"Predator in the Pond"	Beaumont, Texas	February 25, 2012
68	7	"Backyard Swarm"	Shreveport, Louisiana	March 3, 2012
69	8	"Vampires and Serpents"	Shreveport, Louisiana	March 3, 2012
70	9	"Night of the Living Possums"	New Orleans, Louisiana	March 10, 2012
71	10	"Swamp Monster"	Shreveport, Louisiana	March 10, 2012
72	11	"Roadkill"	Shreveport, Louisiana	March 10, 2012

=== Season 6 (2012) ===
No. overall	No. in season	Title	Location	Original release date
73	1	"Snake, Rattle and Roll"	Shreveport, Louisiana	October 6, 2012
74	2	"Monster in the Gulf"	Gulf of Mexico	October 6, 2012
75	3	"Monsters in the Closet"	Shreveport, Louisiana; Beaumont, Texas	October 13, 2012
76	4	"Raccoon Cage Match"	Shreveport, Louisiana	October 13, 2012
77	5	"Fight or Flight"	Shreveport, Louisiana	October 20, 2012
78	6	"Wasp Warfare"	Shreveport, Louisiana; New Orleans, Louisiana	October 20, 2012
79	7	"Claws and Jaws"	Shreveport, Louisiana	October 27, 2012
80	8	"Catch 'Em If You Can"	Shreveport, Louisiana	October 27, 2012
81	9	"Razor Sharp & Angry"	Shreveport, Louisiana	November 10, 2012
82	10	"Feathers & Fangs"	Shreveport, Louisiana; New Orleans, Louisiana; Cotton Bayou, Alabama	November 10, 2012
83	11	"Roach Riot"	Oil City, Louisiana; Shreveport, Louisiana	November 17, 2012
84	12	"The Big Freeze"	Shreveport, Louisiana	November 17, 2012
85	13	"Monster Maze"	Shreveport, Louisiana; Bossier City, Louisiana	December 15, 2012
86	14	"Snarl Slither Snap"	Shreveport, Louisiana	December 15, 2012
87	15	"Gator Pool Party"	Shreveport, Louisiana	December 22, 2012
88	16	"Traps and Snaps"	Shreveport, Louisiana	December 22, 2012

=== Season 7 (2016) ===
No. overall	No. in season	Title	Location	Original release date
89	1	"Canine Cage Match"	Canada	September 9, 2016
90	2	"Henhouse of Horrors"	Canada	September 16, 2016
91	3	"Snakes On A Boat"	Canada	September 23, 2016
92	4	"Paranormal Extermination"	Canada	September 30, 2016
93	5	"Wild Wedding Party"	Canada	October 7, 2016
94	6	"Sting Operation"	Canada	October 14, 2016
95	7	"Reptile Rampage"	Canada	October 21, 2016
96	8	"I Smell A Rat Infestation"	Canada	October 28, 2016
97	9	"Later, Alligator"	Canada	November 4, 2016
98	10	"Magic Show Mayhem"	Canada	November 11, 2016
99	11	"Horns Up"	Canada	November 18, 2016
100	12	"Reindeer Rodeo"	Canada	November 25, 2016
