= Dirty Jobs =

American television series

- Also known as: Dirty Jobs: Rowe'd Trip (2020)
- Starring: Mike Rowe
- Opening theme: "We Care A Lot" by Faith No More (Seasons 1, 3–7) "Pop Rock Theme" by Matt Koskenmaki (Season 2)
- Composers: David Vanacore (Vanacore Music)
- Country of origin: United States
- Original language: English
- No. of seasons: 10
- No. of episodes: 179 (list of episodes)

Production
- Running time: 40–44 minutes
- Production company: Pilgrim Films & Television

Original release
- Network: Discovery Channel
- Release: November 7, 2003 – September 12, 2012
- Release: January 2, 2022 – February 23, 2023

Dirty Jobs is an American reality television series that originally aired on the Discovery Channel in which host Mike Rowe is shown performing difficult, strange, disgusting, or messy occupational duties alongside the job's current employees. The show, produced by Pilgrim Films & Television, premiered with three pilot episodes in November 2003. It returned as a series on July 26, 2005, running for eight seasons until September 12, 2012. The show's setting was refocused in Australia for the final season, called Dirty Jobs Down Under. A spinoff miniseries titled Dirty Jobs: Rowe'd Trip premiered on July 7, 2020. The original series returned on January 2, 2022 for two more seasons, concluding on February 2, 2023.

There is also a European edition of the show hosted by former Manchester United and Denmark goalkeeper Peter Schmeichel.

The series was nominated for five Primetime Emmys: 3 for Outstanding Reality Program, which Rowe was nominated for as a producer, and two for Cinematography.

== Format ==
In each episode, a worker or team of workers takes on Rowe as a fully involved assistant for a typical work day, working hard to complete every task as best he can despite discomfort, hazards, or repulsive situations. The Dirty Jobs crew often gets just as dirty as Rowe does.

== History ==
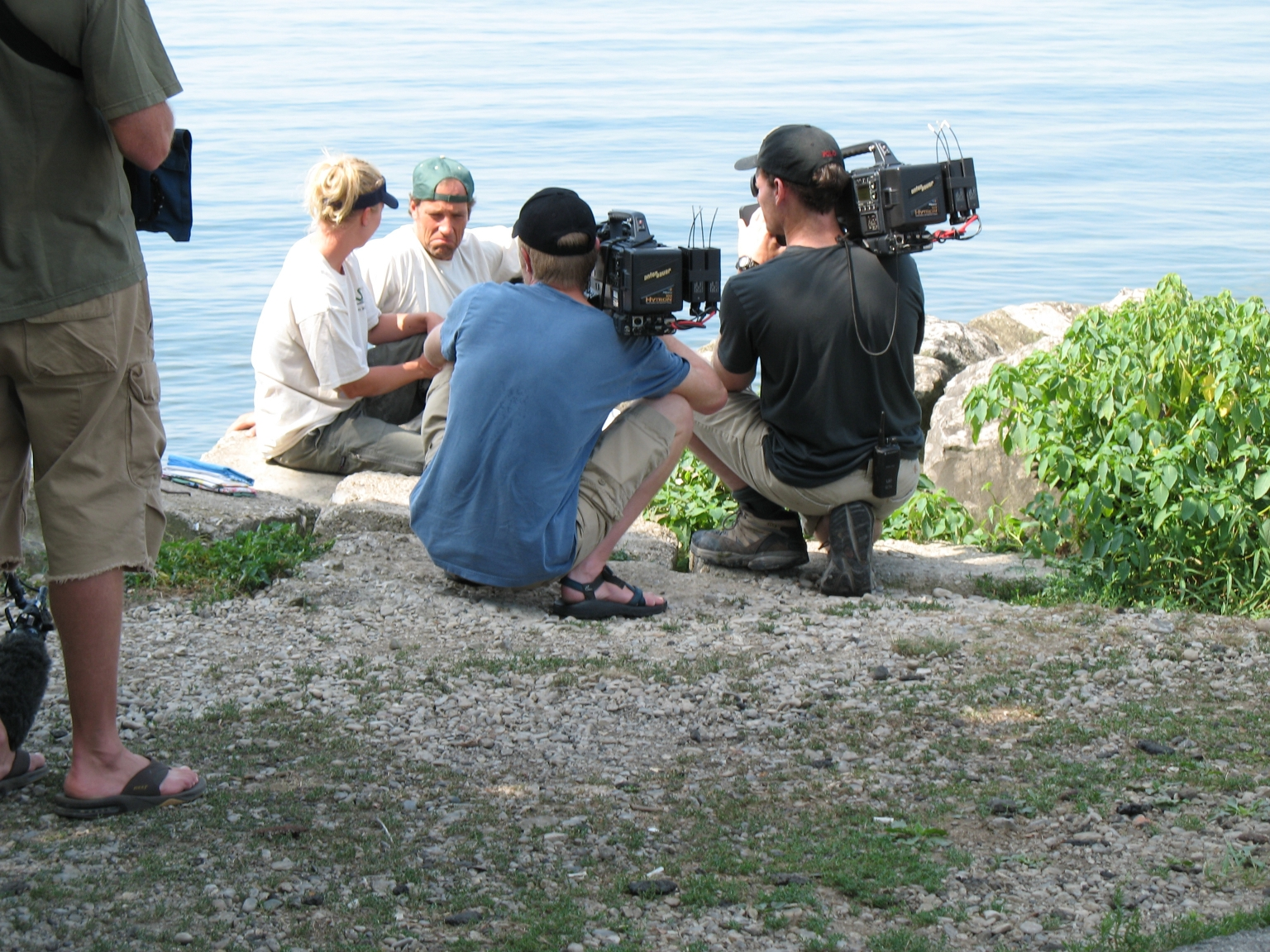
Rowe filming Dirty Jobs

The show is a spin-off of a segment host Mike Rowe once did on a local San Francisco show called Evening Magazine. The segment was called Somebody's Gotta Do It. After completing a graphic piece on cow artificial insemination, Rowe was inundated with letters expressing "shock, horror, fascination, disbelief, and wonder". Rowe sent the tape to numerous networks, including Comedy Central, who replied saying "At this time, our fall schedule does not allow for a talk show that takes place inside a septic tank." Ultimately Rowe also sent the tape to the Discovery Channel, which commissioned a series based on this format. Dirty Jobs was produced by Craig Piligian (executive producer) of Pilgrim Films & Television. The Discovery Channel executive producer was Gena McCarthy.

=== Somebody's Gotta Do It ===
On May 6, 2013, Rowe posted on Facebook that he was open to creating a new show that is similar to Dirty Jobs using Somebody's Gotta Do It, the title of the original segment that had inspired Dirty Jobs. Rowe said that if half the people on his Facebook fan page said "Hey, Mike, here's 10 bucks for jet fuel and basic production costs," he'd "put the band back together and start shooting Somebody's Gotta Do It tomorrow." On April 10, 2014, Rowe announced on his Facebook page that CNN had decided to air the show.

=== Revival and Rowe'd Trip ===
On August 12, 2018, Rowe posted on Facebook that "the idea is being floated around" to reboot Dirty Jobs on the Discovery Channel. On November 3, 2019, Rowe wrote that "there's been a lot of chatter about a reboot, and I’m open to it. So too, is (producer Dave) Barsky. Stay tuned…"

On June 23, 2020, it was announced that a spin-off titled Dirty Jobs: Rowe'd Trip had finished filming and would premiere on July 7, 2020. Rowe mentioned that the spin-off happened because the COVID-19 pandemic disrupted plans to film episodes in the original Dirty Jobs format.

On November 15, 2021, Discovery, Inc. announced that Dirty Jobs would return, again with Rowe as host. The premiere of the revived series aired on Discovery and Discovery+ on January 2, 2022.

== Episodes ==
Season	Episodes	Originally released	
Season	Episodes	First released	Last released
Pilots	3	November 7, 2003	November 21, 2003
1	6	July 26, 2005	August 30, 2005
2	45	September 27, 2005	March 20, 2007
3	34	June 26, 2007	July 29, 2008
4	21	October 7, 2008	April 12, 2009
5	22	October 6, 2009	June 14, 2010
6	23	October 19, 2010	March 8, 2011
7	11	December 13, 2011	February 21, 2012
8	4	August 22, 2012	September 12, 2012
Rowe'd Trip	4	July 7, 2020	July 28, 2020
9	6	January 2, 2022	February 6, 2022
10	8	December 11, 2022	February 5, 2023

In July 2006, the show aired two special episodes to kick off and wrap up Discovery's annual Shark Week, of which Rowe was the host. The episodes featured him in a number of jobs related to the animals, some as outlandish as shark repellent tester and shark suit tester, both of which necessitated his jumping into a shark feeding frenzy. As a pun on Discovery Channel's "Shark Week" theme, the two episodes were named "Jobs That Bite" and "Jobs That Bite... Harder" for the opening and closing hours respectively.

In late August 2006, the show reached a milestone with Rowe's 100th dirty job. This was commemorated with a special two-hour episode which mainly showed Rowe's day with the U.S. Army's 187th Ordnance Battalion at Fort Jackson, and included bloopers plus an "about me" segment of Rowe's crew. At the end of the episode, Rowe and Dave Barsky had a guitar/banjo duet and performed a song about the 100 dirty jobs. A 2-hour 150th job special aired in early December 2007, which combined footage of Rowe's 150th job (working on a yak and bison farm in Montana) with footage of a party held at a San Francisco garbage dump where people featured in past Dirty Jobs segments were reunited with Rowe. In 2009, the show returned for a fifth season, with Rowe commenting in promotional spots, "After 200 dirty jobs, I'm back for more."

It was renewed for a seventh season, which Rowe described as including "a broader geographical palate."

An eighth season, marketed as Dirty Jobs Down Under, premiered on August 22, 2012. There were only four episodes filmed for season eight.

As a result of being featured in the season 1 episode "Vexcon", exterminator Billy Bretherton later starred in his own series on A&E, Billy the Exterminator.

=== Submissions ===
Each episode ends with a segment, usually shot at a previous dirty job, where Rowe tells the viewers that the show's continued existence depends on viewer submissions of suggestions for additional dirty jobs, and instructs them to go to the show's website for details on how to submit ideas (this segment is, however, usually edited out of the Canadian broadcasts of the series on Discovery Channel Canada). Rowe has often noted on-screen and off-screen that without viewer contributions, the show would be lost; Rowe originally concocted a list of a dozen jobs that could be featured in the three episodes that served as the show's pilot, and within days after the first episode aired, viewers flooded Discovery Channel with e-mail and video featuring their own dirty jobs, a tradition that has kept the show going ever since. As Rowe explained to Craig Ferguson on an episode of The Late Late Show with Craig Ferguson in July 2007 about his original cache of jobs for the pilots, "I haven't had an original idea since then".

=== Unaired segments ===
According to roadkill taxidermy artist Stephen Paternite, Dirty Jobs filmed a segment featuring him in 2003, which was ultimately cut by the Discovery Channel as "too gross". The segment follows Rowe and Paternite as they gather and skin dead raccoons, which Paternite will eventually turn into art pieces. The segment is available to view on Paternite's website, and on YouTube, under the name "Too Gross for Discovery". In an interview on The Late Late Show with Craig Ferguson, Rowe also mentioned that there were several segments which they have chosen not to air because they were too disturbing, including a "body farm" for the study of decomposition. Even aired segments can be heavily edited, such as the "skull cleaner" segment, the final aired version of which Rowe has likened to "The Sound of Music with the songs edited out" because parts of it were deemed too graphic for television.

There is also an episode produced in 2006 where in Rowe visited his doctor while producers Piligian and Eddie Barbini try two dirty jobs themselves. The episode, entitled "Mike's Day Off", was never aired in the United States for that season; it was only available as a DVD-exclusive episode (bundled with the episode "Skull Cleaner") and a downloadable episode in iTunes. The episode has been aired in some local Discovery Channel feeds such as those of Southeast Asia and Australia, as well as on Discovery Channel Canada before finally being aired in the United States on March 3, 2009. Various episodes air in certain countries with different scenes.

== Music ==
The show's theme song was originally Faith No More's "We Care A Lot" which features the lyric "Oh, it's a dirty job but someone's gotta do it". At some point in every episode, a screen with the Dirty Jobs logo pops up before a commercial then a part of the song "Get On Out In Here" by Matt Koskenmaki plays. In the first half of 2007, "We Care A Lot" was replaced with "Pop Rock Theme" by Matt Koskenmaki (who also did the other music cues for the show), due to rights issues; older episodes aired at the time had their introductions reedited. Rowe has said "Bottom line, the rights to 'We Care a Lot' were either not renewed on time, or not properly acquired in the first place". Although the network has not issued any statement clarifying the situation, "We Care A Lot" returned as the show's theme song beginning with the June 26, 2007 episode and has been retained on subsequent DVD releases of earlier episodes.

Season 2 commercials for the show feature the song "Dirty White Boy" by Foreigner. Season 3 commercials feature Rowe sharing the stage with a pig positioned on a rounded white pedestal, with nondescript formal-sounding light instrumental music in the background.

Rowe often sings on-camera during the segments as part of a sardonic hat-tip to his days as an opera singer. During the candy making segment in episode 34 ("Fuel Tank Cleaner"), Rowe discovers that one of the candy makers makes a confection called "opera fudge" and ask if she sings opera during the making of opera fudge, then belts out a segment of "Vecchia zimarra" from Puccini's La Bohéme. During the cow pots segment of episode 47 ("Poo Pot Maker"), Rowe imitates the singing gondoliers of Venice while paddling around the liquid holding lagoon on the Freund farm: "'O Sole Mio/Don't know the words/I've paddled for hours/In ponds of turds..." In a 2007 episode set at Prince George's Stadium with Rowe spending the day doing the "dirty jobs" associated with groundskeeping and dugout maintenance for the Bowie Baysox minor league baseball team in Bowie, Maryland, Rowe ended the segment singing the National Anthem prior to the game and throwing out the first pitch.

When Rowe reads the last piece of viewer mail in the viewer's choice episode, he was asked if he could sing the Dirty Jobs Theme Song because his online bio says that he used to be an opera singer. So he explained that one night, as they sat on Folly Creek, after a night of oysters and drinking, he, Juke Joint Johnny and Sam (likely Silky Sam) jotted down some lyrics and the "official, unofficial Dirty Jobs Theme Song" was born. This short version of the song is just under a minute long, and it varies a bit from later versions, being less planned than the later ones.

At the end of the pipe organ specialist segment of the geoduck farmer episode, Rowe sang what he called the Dirty Jobs Anthem. Rowe reprised this moment in the "Leather Tanner" episode from the third season on an antique piano at the tannery.

At the conclusion of a two-hour special edition commemorating Rowe's 100th dirty job, he and field producer Dave Barsky faked a guitar/banjo duet, featuring an extended version of this anthem which ran a little over two minutes in length (Rowe actually sang all the parts while Rowe's friend Matt played all the instruments). The extended song differs slightly from the shorter versions which aired previously, and even the words that are similar vary somewhat. Rowe performed the song again with slightly different lyrics on the 150th Job Extravaganza with the Burning Embers.

== DVD releases ==
Discovery Channel has released over 130 episodes on DVD and on iTunes.

DVD name	No. of episodes	Run time (minutes)	Release
Dirty Jobs Season 1 DVD Set	10	430	July 2006
Dirty Jobs Season 2 DVD Set	25	1,080	January 28, 2008
Dirty Jobs Season 3 DVD Set	23	1,032	2008
Dirty Jobs Season 4 DVD Set	25	1,075	April 6, 2010
Dirty Jobs Season 5 DVD Set	17	817	2011
Dirty Jobs – Collection 1	9	494	September 4, 2007
Dirty Jobs – Collection 2	12	502	February 5, 2008
Dirty Jobs – Collection 3	12	480	August 26, 2008
Dirty Jobs – Collection 4	13	576	February 24, 2009
Dirty Jobs – Collection 5	17	430	January 26, 2010
Dirty Jobs – Collection 6	11	430	September 7, 2010
Dirty Jobs – Collection 7	10	430	May 3, 2011
Dirty Jobs – Collection 8	10	450	August 7, 2012
Dirty Jobs – Something Fishy	4	167	February 23, 2010
Dirty Jobs – Toughest Jobs	5	220	May 15, 2012
Dirty Jobs Down Under	4	176	March 11, 2014

== See also ==
- The Worst Jobs in History – a UK series that debuted in 2004 with a similar premise to Dirty Jobs except host Tony Robinson experiences "dirty jobs" that were common in British society centuries ago.
- Somebody's Gotta Do It – the indirect successor to Dirty Jobs, a CNN series hosted by Rowe and including a number of Dirty Jobs crew.
