= Skulls Unlimited International =

American commercial bone cleaning service

Skulls Unlimited International, Inc.
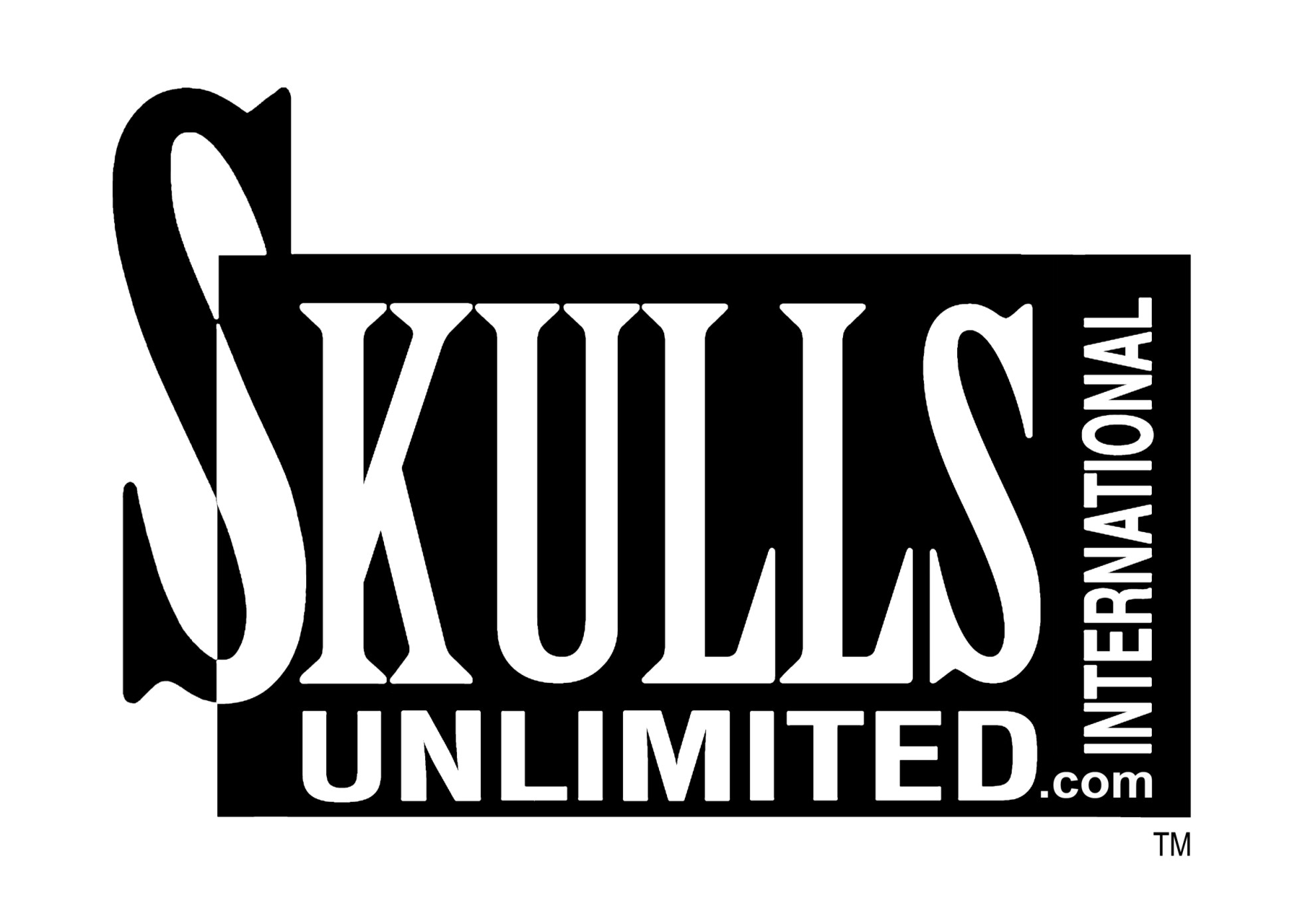
- Company type: Privately-held
- Industry: Retail
- Founded: June 1986
- Headquarters: Oklahoma City, Oklahoma, U.S.
- Area served: Worldwide
- Key people: Jay Villemarette (president)
- Products: Real and replica skulls and skeletons
- Website: www.skullsunlimited.com

Skulls Unlimited International, Inc. is a commercial supplier of osteological specimens located in Oklahoma City, Oklahoma, US. Skulls Unlimited Inc. provides a skull cleaning service, using dermestid beetles to strip the flesh from skulls and skeletons. The bones are later whitened using hydrogen peroxide. Skulls Unlimited processes approximately 25,000 skull specimens per year.

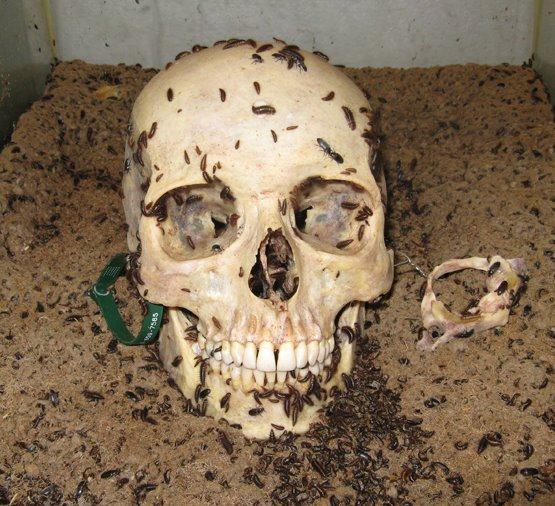
Dermestid beetles being used to clean a human skull at Skulls Unlimited International.

== History ==
In 1986, Jay Villemarette was laid off from his job and started considering the possibility of working full-time with skulls. In June of that year he established Skulls Unlimited International Inc. His fascination with skulls and bones began when he was seven years old, after he found a dog skull in the woods near his home. That interest, along with encouragement from his father, led Villemarette to begin collecting other animal skulls. After graduating from high school, he collected and sold skulls in his spare time while working as an automotive technician. As sales grew, Villemarette and his wife Kim began to clean skulls in their kitchen.

After relocating to a retail location for his business in 1992, Villemarette was able to employ his first full-time employees. Skulls Unlimited Inc. remained at their South Shields address until June 2000, when they expanded into a facility in Oklahoma City. The company sources human bones from bodies donated to science.

In January 2013, Villemarette guest starred on John Hodgman's podcast Judge John Hodgman as an "expert witness" to comment on the hobby of collecting skeletons and taxidermied animals.

== Museum of Osteology ==
In 2004, Skulls Unlimited Inc. started construction on a building that now houses Skulls Unlimited's corporate offices and the Museum of Osteology. The museum opened to the public in 2010 and exhibits over 300 real skeletons and over 400 real skulls, focusing on the form and function of the skeletal system. In 2015, Skulls Unlimited opened a second museum in Orlando, Florida, which closed and merged with the Oklahoma location in 2020.
