= Gold Rush (TV series) =

American reality television series

- Narrated by: Paul Christie; Dean Lennox Kelly (seasons 1–11) (UK broadcast); Shaun Dooley (seasons 12–present) (UK broadcast)
- Country of origin: United States
- Original language: English
- No. of seasons: 17 (+2 mini-series)
- No. of episodes: 428 (list of episodes)

Production
- Executive producer: Christo Doyle
- Production locations: Klondike, Yukon, Canada and Alaska, United States (season 12)
- Running time: 60 minutes
- Production company: Raw TV

Original release
- Network: Discovery Channel
- Release: December 3, 2010 – present

Related
- Gold Rush: White Water; Gold Rush: Parker's Trail; Gold Rush: Dave Turin's Lost Mine; Gold Rush: Mine Rescue with Freddy & Juan; Gold Rush: Winter's Fortune; Bering Sea Gold; Bering Sea Gold: Under the Ice; Ice Cold Gold; Hoffman Family Gold; Jungle Gold; America's Backyard Gold; Yukon Gold

Gold Rush (titled Gold Rush: Alaska in the first season) is an American reality television television series that airs on Discovery and its affiliates worldwide. The series follows the placer gold mining efforts of various family-run mining companies, initially in Alaska, but then mostly in the Klondike region of Dawson City, Yukon, Canada. Prior seasons also included mining efforts in Guyana, Oregon, and Colorado. As of 2025, the show has aired 16 seasons.

== Overview ==
Gold ore total per season in troy ounces
Season	1 (2010)	2	3	4	5	6 (2015)	7	8	9	10	11 (2020)	12	13	14	15	16
Hoffman/Turin	14.64	93.5	803	2	1349	3032	1100.77	1644	-	-	-	-	-	-	-	-
Schnabel	-	34	192	1029	2538	3372	4311	6280	7427.25	7223	7504.9	8309.75	8118	7381.1	6837.4	10596.45
Hurt	-	80.4	163	280	-	-	-	-	-	-	-	-	-	-	-	-
Beets	-	-	-	-	?	737	2176	3659	~4400	2259.36	3030.26	4620.9	5295	3054	5777.12	11231
Ness	-	-	-	-	-	-	-	-	1105	547	~1080	2047	-	1125.7	1720.05	1811.56
Lewis	-	-	-	-	-	-	-	-	-	-	6.39	~110	157	-	-	-
Clayton	-	-	-	-	-	-	-	-	-	-	-	-	168	-	-	-
McCaughan	-	-	-	-	-	-	-	-	-	-	-	-	-	1565.7	-	-
Kevin Beets	-	-	-	-	-	-	-	-	-	-	-	-	-	-	1056.57	1591

=== Season 1 ===
The show was named Gold Rush: Alaska in its first season, and featured six men from Sandy, Oregon, a small town 30 miles (48 km) southeast of Portland. Due to the economic downturn, the men had lost their jobs; they decided on an all-stakes gamble: travel to Porcupine, Alaska, to prospect for gold. Most of them had little or no previous placer gold mining experience and had to learn on the job.

The season was marred by equipment malfunctions and crew inexperience. The crew's initial plan to strip mine a site near Porcupine Creek is quickly disrupted in favor of Jack Hoffman's search for an ancient waterfall that he hoped could contain a large cache of gold nuggets. Halfway through the season, claim owner Earle Foster sends Dakota Fred, an experienced miner, out in an attempt to improve the site's efficiency. Despite late season heroics, the crew is unable to hit a rhythm and cover their costs. By the end of the season, the Hoffman crew had recovered 14.64 ounces of gold.

=== Season 2 ===
In season 2, with the show renamed Gold Rush, Todd misses a lease payment on Porcupine Creek, and "Dakota" Fred Hurt buys the claim from owner Earle Foster, not needing to honor the lease due to the missed payment. The season explores the Hoffman crew's new mine at Quartz Creek, in the Klondike region of Dawson City, Yukon, Canada, as well as "Dakota" Fred's operation at the site of the original Hoffman mine, Porcupine Creek, and Parker Schnabel's attempts to mine his grandfather's property at Big Nugget Mine.

At Porcupine creek, Dakota Fred focuses his operation around further expanding the original Hoffman mine. At the beginning of the season he removes all of the Hoffman's original equipment in favor of a different mining set-up known as a de-rocker, in an attempt to process dirt more efficiently than the Hoffman's were able to last season.

The gold recovered by each team for the season was:

Hurt Crew, Porcupine Creek: 80.4 ozt (2,500 g) $125,000
Schnabel Crew, Big Nugget Mine: 34 ozt (1,100 g) $55,000
Hoffman Crew, Quartz Creek: 93.5 ozt (2,910 g) $150,000

=== Season 3 ===
The third season began in October 2012. The Hoffman crew returned to the Klondike to once again mine the Quartz Creek site but also brought on additional crewmen to simultaneously work another site in the area. However, with Hoffman having delays and equipment trouble at his site, they decided to merge with Dave Turin's team at Indian River. Parker Schnabel returned to the Big Nugget Mine site with larger and more efficient equipment, while "Dakota" Fred Hurt and his crew returned to the Porcupine Creek site.

The Turin crew mined 803 ounces of gold, earning them over $1.28 million. Incredibly, this was only 3 ounces more than Dave Turin predicted they would recover when asked by the executive producer on the Season 2 Aftershow. Parker and Dakota Fred mined 192 ounces and 163 ounces, respectively, worth over a quarter-million dollars each. This was a large success in comparison to the first season, where no team recovered more than 50 ounces of gold.

=== Season 4 ===
The fourth season began airing in August 2013 and started with a preseason episode called "The Dirt" featuring interviews with all the teams featured in season three. Gold Rush: Guyana South America features the Hoffman crew in South America, Parker Schnabel leasing new land at Scribner Creek with mentor Tony Beets in Dawson City, and "Dakota" Fred Hurt and his son Dustin mining at Cahoon Creek, a hard-to-reach, post-glacial area mined only with pickaxes in the late 1800s. The actual Season 4 premiere was October 25, 2013.

The Hoffman crew mined barely two ounces of gold, supplemented by a paltry $1,350 worth of diamonds, and were forced to abandon their Guyana mining operation. The Dakota boys mined 280 ounces, and Parker and his crew mined 836 ounces by the end of the season. Parker then stayed and continued mining with Rick, picking up an additional 193 ounces and bringing his season total to 1,029 ounces. Parker's $1.4 million haul not only broke Todd Hoffman's single-season record of 803 ounces but also eclipsed Hoffman's entire four-season total.

=== Season 5 ===
The two-hour Gold Rush season 5 premiere broadcast on Friday, October 17, 2014, at 9 PM ET/PT with The Dirt airing beforehand at 8 PM ET/PT on the Discovery Channel.

By season's end, Parker had mined 2,538 ounces totaling just under $3 million, and the Hoffmans had mined 1,349 ounces totaling just over $1.6 million.

=== Season 6 ===
The two-hour Gold Rush season 6 premiere started in the United States on October 16, 2015, with The Dirt airing beforehand on the Discovery Channel, while the UK premiere was on October 20, 2015. By the season's end, Tony's dredge had pulled out 737 ounces, Parker managed to mine 3,372 ounces worth almost $3.5 million, and the Hoffmans mined 3,032 ounces worth just over $3 million.

=== Season 7 ===
Season 7 premiered on October 14, 2016. By the end of season 7, Todd's mining effort in Oregon had failed, although he finished the summer at a Fairplay, Colorado, mine with a break-even total just over 1100 ounces. Tony Beets and family finished with just over 2100 ounces using a refurbished gold mining dredge. Parker Schnabel and his crew finished with just over 4300 ounces, worth in excess of $5 million.

=== Season 8 ===
Season 8 premiered on October 13, 2017. The season finds the Hoffman and Schnabel crews wagering 100 ounces of gold to the company that mines the most gold, with both vying for a 5,000-ounce season goal. Meanwhile, Tony Beets is disassembling, transporting, and reassembling another vintage dredge, resurrecting a method of placer mining that has not been in common use in Dawson City for half a century. It was announced on Gold Rush Live that season 8 would be the last season on the show for the Hoffman family.

By season's end, the Hoffmans had mined 1,644 ounces in Colorado, worth just under $2 million. Schnabel's crew finished with 6,280 ounces mining in the Yukon, worth $7.5 million. Tony Beets finished with 3,659 ounces at Eureka Creek, worth $4.39 million.

=== Season 9 ===
Season 9 debuted on October 11, 2018, with an episode 0 entitled "The Story So Far". Episodes during this season focused on the mining efforts of Rick Ness in his first season operating independently, Parker Schnabel and his crew, and Tony Beets and his family. The season was slated to have 20 episodes, with the final one airing in March 2019.

Parker's crew exceeded his 7,000 goal at Scribner Creek, mining 7,427.25 ounces (worth nearly $9 million). Rick Ness mined 1,105 ounces, worth $1.3 million, and beat his 1,000 ounce season goal. Tony Beets fell short of his 6,000 ounce goal, mining just under 4,400 ounces.

=== Season 10 ===
Season 10 premiered on October 11, 2019. It focused on the mining crews of Parker Schnabel, Tony Beets, and Rick Ness in the Klondike. The 21st and final episode of the season aired on March 6, 2020. Although Parker Schnabel ended his season 204 ounces short of his previous record year, the 7223 ounces mined actually netted him over $1 million more than in season 9 because he largely mined his own ground and paid far less in royalties. Due to rising gold prices, Parker's gold haul was worth $10.8 million. Rick Ness had a disappointing year moving his operation to Duncan Creek in the hills above Keno City. He encountered permafrost and was unable to locate gold-rich pockets to feed his wash plant Monster Red, which he had purchased for a half a million dollars at the beginning of the season. Rick's final tally was 547 ounces, barely breaking even. Tony Beets had to move his operation out of Eureka and the Indian River area, due to water lease expirations. He relocated to Paradise Hill and was able to mine 2259 ounces by the end of the season.

=== Season 11 ===
Filming of Season 11, and mining for the 2020 mining season was affected by the COVID-19 pandemic. Though miners were considered essential workers by the Yukon government, the film crews themselves are not part of that determination. Canada having been on travel lockdown at the start of the filming season meant that the production crews from RAW TV production company were still stuck in Britain. At the start of mining, only one filming crewmember was onsite with the Beets, and Monica Beets had added on filming duties. Neither the Schnabel nor Ness mining crews were onsite at the start of the mining season, they've been at home in quarantine, mostly in the U.S. For the new mining season; Parker Schnabel successfully crosses the border from Alaska and quarantines for two weeks in Whitehorse, Yukon, Canada. The Beets quarantine for 2 weeks at their mine site, and plan to have it locked down for the season. After a 2-week quarantine, a local film crew of 4 comes to film the Beets. Rick Ness quarantines while on the road from Wisconsin to the Yukon, with an extended fuel tank for his pickup, by limiting any contact while roadtripping. Led by Special Forces Medic Fred Lewis, a new crew joined the show. The eleventh season premiered on October 23, 2020.

=== Season 12 ===
Gold Rush season 12 began broadcast on Friday, September 24, 2021, with "Ground War" on Discovery Channel. It focused on the mining crews of Parker Schnabel, Tony Beets, Rick Ness and Fred Lewis, who joins forces with the neighboring Clayton Brothers toward the end of the season.

=== Season 13 ===
Gold Rush season 13 began broadcast on Friday, September 30, 2022, with "A Seismic Shift" on Discovery Channel. It focused on the mining crews of Parker Schnabel (Alaska and Yukon sites), Tony Beets, Fred Lewis, Clayton Brothers. It features cameos with Dave Turin's mine, as he retires from mining. Rick Ness chose not to mine and was only featured briefly at the start to explain his absence.

=== Season 14 ===
Gold Rush season 14 began broadcast on Friday, September 29, 2023, with "The $160 Million Gamble" on Discovery Channel. It focused on the mining crews of Parker Schnabel, Tony Beets, Rick Ness and the McCaughans.

=== Season 15 ===
Gold Rush season 15 began broadcast on Friday, November 8, 2024, with "Greed Is Good" on Discovery Channel. It focused on the mining crews of Parker Schnabel, Tony Beets, Rick Ness and Kevin Beets.

=== Season 16 ===
Gold Rush season 16 began broadcast on Friday, November 7, 2025, with "Records Will Be Broken" on Discovery Channel. It focused on the mining crews of Parker Schnabel, Tony Beets, Rick Ness and Kevin Beets.

=== Season 17 ===
Gold Rush season 17 began broadcast on Friday, October 2, 2026, with "The Most Gold Wins" on Discovery Channel. It focused on the mining crews of Parker Schnabel, Tony Beets, Rick Ness and new player Greg Gibson..

== Other programming ==
=== Aftershows and specials ===
Numerous "aftershows" and specials (several named The Dirt, some called The Aftershow) have been produced that document behind-the-scenes action featuring additional footage, as well as studio interviews with miners and crew. Several extended versions of episodes (usually named "Pay Dirt") have information bubbles and more mining coverage. When the COVID-19 pandemic struck the TV season, the interview shows were affected, these episodes were called The Dirt: Home Edition.

=== Gold Rush: The Jungle ===
Between the second and third seasons, Todd Hoffman and several crew members traveled to a remote site in Guyana in South America to determine the feasibility of opening up an operation there during the Klondike off-seasons. The trip was covered in a single one-hour episode. Although they did discover gold on the claim site, it was not of a sufficient quantity to cover the high expenses of mining the remote site which was accessible only by hiking through a trackless jungle after a harrowing river passage. While the Hoffman crew does go to Guyana for season 4 a year later, given the low probability of profitability, Hoffman chose not to pursue the venture for season 3. The episode ended with doubt about whether they would return.

=== Gold Rush: South America ===
Between the third and fourth seasons, Todd Hoffman and several crew members traveled to South America to prospect for gold in Chile, Guyana, and Peru. This was covered in several episodes, in a summer season for Gold Rush.

=== Gold Rush: Parker's Trail ===
Starting in 2017, a series of episodes branded as "Parker's Trail" have followed Parker Schnabel on trips to other areas. In 2017, a five-part series featured Schnabel and his crew attempting to follow the Klondike Trail. In 2018, a seven-episode series followed Schnabel and his crew flying, hiking and boating through and attempting to mine at stops in Guyana. In 2019, a ten-episode series followed Schnabel and his crew sailing, flying, hiking and driving through Papua New Guinea in northern Oceania, while attempting to mine at stops along the way.

In 2020, in a 10-episode series that debuted on March 13, Schnabel and his crew drove through and stopped to mine in Australia's Victoria, Queensland, and Western Australia states. In 2022, in a 10-episode series that debuted on June 13, Schnabel and his crew investigated placer operations in the West Coast and Otago regions of the South Island of New Zealand, specifically the miner's distinctive "Kiwi Wash Plants". After visiting the New Zealand mine sites, Parker decided to build his own wash plant with the help of gold recovery engineer and builder Jeff Turnell from British Columbia, Canada. For the Australia and New Zealand seasons, Parker was joined by Australian female gold miner Tyler Mahoney, who previously appeared in Aussie Gold Hunters, a show similar to Gold Rush.

=== Gold Rush: White Water ===
This spin-off series follows the "Dakota Boys"—Dustin and his father, "Dakota" Fred—as they mine McKinley and Cahoon Creeks in Haines Borough, Alaska, using an unconventional dredging method: diving into whitewater collection pools at the base of high country waterfalls. The series debuted in January 2018. The series ran for nine seasons, the last being in 2025 due to cancellation.

=== Gold Rush: Dave Turin's Lost Mine ===
This spin-off series follows Dave Turin, formerly of the Hoffman crew, as he looks to start new mining operations at disused gold mines in the Western United States. Dave Turin has set up Golden Streets Mining LLC as the mining company for this venture. The series debuted in March 2019 (the mining took place in 2018), centering on a placer mine along Lynx Creek near Prescott Valley, Arizona (season gold total 80oz, $96,000). In 2020 (the mining took place in 2019), the show's second season ran from February to April, with eight episodes centering on a placer mine along Silver Creek in Birdseye, near Marysville, Montana (season gold total 225.1oz, $340,000). In 2021 (the mining took place in 2020), the show's third season ran 19 episodes from March to July, centering on a placer mine along Box Creek in Lake County, Colorado for 12 weeks (gold total 426.8oz, $810,000) before moving back to Lynx Creek in Arizona for the last four weeks (gold total 174oz; whole season gold total 600.95oz, over $1,000,000). On 18 August 2020, a member of the mining crew, Jesse Goins, dies during filming because of a sudden heart attack. In 2022 (the mining took place in 2021), the show's fourth season ran 17 episodes from May to September, centering on a placer mine along Glacier Creek in the Chugach Census Area, near Valdez, Alaska, for 13 out of 20 weeks (season gold total 463oz, over $800,000).

In 2022, Dave Turin began the process of selling the Valdez Glacier Creek claim to Nathan Clark and Jason Sanchez, 2 members of his crew from the beginning of this spin-off series, as Dave retires from mining. This process aired in 2023 (the mining took place in 2022; season gold total 29.75oz), as part of the regular Gold Rush TV series; there being no Dave Turin's Lost Mine season for the wind-up.

=== Gold Rush: Mine Rescue with Freddy & Juan ===
On December 3, 2020, it was announced that a spin-off titled Gold Rush: Freddy Dodge's Mine Rescue would premiere on January 4, 2021, on the Discovery+ video streaming service. The Martinson mining family, shown as background characters on Bering Sea Gold, was featured in one episode of season 1, where the show featured excavator barge seafloor mining.

=== Gold Rush: Winter's Fortune ===
The spin-off premiered for the first time on July 30, 2021. Tony Beets, Rick Ness, Dave Turin, Fred Lewis, and Dustin Hurt start the off-season prospecting, scouting, and preparing for the 2021 season because of high gold prices due to the COVID-19 pandemic. Winter's Fortune mainly took place in the Yukon and Alaska.

=== Hoffman Family Gold ===
On September 24, 2021, Discovery announced a standalone series that premiered in February 2022 focusing on Todd Hoffman's return to gold mining. It takes place 100 miles north of Nome, Alaska and includes his father, Jack, and son, Hunter.

== Cast ==
Current Cast:

Seasons	Name	Details
1 – present	Parker Schnabel (age 32)	Parker was given the Big Nugget mine in season 2 when his grandfather, John Schnabel, decided to step up. He guest-starred and gave advice in Season One. In seasons 2 and 3 he works to find new gold at Big Nugget mine, but after exhausting all Virgin ground takes his efforts to the Yukon from Season 4 onward.
2 – present	Rick Ness	Parker's right-hand man. Left Parker at the end of Season 8 to go out on his own. Mine boss in season 9.
2 – present	Roger Schnabel	Recurring guest star, part-owner of Big Nugget mine, father of Parker Schnabel, son of John Schnabel.
1 – present	Fred "Freddy" Dodge	Recurring guest star, helped the Hoffman Crew reassemble their wash plant in season 1. He returned to the Klondike in season 2 to give the Hoffmans better gold recovery tools. He also went to Guyana with the crew in season 4. He makes sporadic appearances to the various mining crews as a general troubleshooter and in 2024 debuted in his own spin-off series Gold Rush: Freddy Dodge's Mine Rescue, where he visits struggling mining operations across the US and Canada, offering technical help and advice to turn their fortunes around.
2 – present	Tony Beets (age 69)	Dutch-Canadian gold miner and owner of one of the most successful mining operations in the Klondike. He also owns and leased out the Scribner Creek claim that Parker Schnabel mined in season 4. Beets will have his own crew for season 5, working on moving a 75-year-old dredge from Clear Creek to his claim over 150 miles away in the Indian River.
1 – present	Chris Doumitt (age 59)	Originally he was only meant to come to Alaska for ten days — to help build a cabin for Greg Remsburg and his family. But gold mining quickly got under his skin and he ended up staying for five months and becoming a key member of the team. He calls himself a "pumpologist". Chris retired from the Hoffman crew after season 3. From season 4 on he worked for Parker Schnabel.

Former Cast:

Seasons	Name	Details
1–8	Todd Hoffman (age 57)	Inspired by his father's gold mining adventures in the 1980s. Brings together his original crew to mine at Porcupine Creek, and is seen frequently moving to new mine sites following his dream of striking it rich.
1–8	Jack Hoffman (age 71)	Father of Todd, he previously mined for gold in Alaska 25 years ago, and joins the crew for a second chance to live his dream. Throughout his seasons on the show is frequently seen hunting for "gloryholes", sites of massive gold accumulation that are infrequent.
1	Jimmy Dorsey	A Realtor and self-confessed adrenalin junkie. After an off-camera physical altercation with Greg Remsburg, he left the mining crew in season one. He has claimed at least parts of the show are scripted.
1–2	James Harness	The crew mechanic, he prided himself on being able to repair nearly anything. However, a car wreck left him with metal pins in his ankle and a severe spinal injury which, due to lack of finances, he could not afford to have surgically repaired. A Baltimore medical center donated a medical procedure to correct his back problem, which resulted in the need for yearly injections. During season 2 when operations were halted due to dirty water, Todd asked him to build a water filter. Instead, he left the camp to spend a week with his girlfriend in a motel. At the end of the season, the crew fired him, blaming him for missing their 100-ounce target. In season 5, James died in June 2014 at age 57, reportedly of a stroke. The members of the Hoffman crew were saddened by his passing.
1	Earle Foster	Recurring guest star in season 1, owner of the Jim Nail Placer Mine in season 1; cameo appearances in seasons 2 and 3. Foster died on April 23, 2013, aged 86.
1,5	Michael Halstead	In the first season "Pastor Mike" was billed as the crew pastor. Mike was pastor of the Harvest Christian Church in Troutdale, Oregon at the time. He had done charity work in Mexico in the past and had met Jack Hoffman twenty years ago on one of those trips. Jack introduced Mike to elk hunting and the two of them shared an enthusiasm for outdoor adventures, often going on trips together. He took part in a few episodes in the first half of season one, but went home for an unknown reason and was never mentioned again. He reappears in the beginning of season 5 to counsel Todd Hoffman, who has been battling depression from the aftermath of season 4.
3	Wayne "Nugget Brain" Peterson	Joining the Dakota Boys for part of Season 3, Wayne was an experienced miner who has been working claims since 1983. He was fired by Dakota Fred due to his use of Oxycodone (with prescription) to treat a back problem.
3	Jason Otteson	Main investor for Hoffman/Turin crew for season 3. Set a 350-ounce ultimatum and, when it was not met, he suggested to Todd that he should cut some crew. He was never seen or mentioned again on the original series but returns on Hoffman Family Gold, recruiting the Hoffmans to help return one of his mines to profitability, with the potential offer of a long-term lease if they are successful.
1–4	"Dakota" Fred Hurt (age 70)	After advising the Hoffman crew in the last half of season 1, "Dakota" Fred returns for season 2 to purchase the Jim Nail Placer Mine to mine himself with his own crew. Fred, Dustin, and Melody left the show after season 4. Gold Rush: White Water, debuting in January 2018, follows Fred and his son Dustin as they search for gold in McKinley Creek. Hurt died in 2023.
2–4	Dustin Hurt (age 34)	Dustin is "Dakota" Fred's son. He worked at the Jim Nail Placer Mine in season 2. Left the show after season 4. Gold Rush: White Water focuses on Dustin and his father.
3–4	Melody Tallis (age 51)	Joining the Dakota Boys in season 3, Melody is an experienced miner who has been working claims across Alaska since 2002. She left the show after season 4, along with Dakota Fred and Dustin, although during Season 5, she can be seen working loaders and monitors in the background of shots covering Tony Beets and also worked with Freddy Dodge at Carmacks.
1 – 5	Greg Remsburg (age 41)	Greg left the Hoffman crew after season 3 for undisclosed reasons; however, he returned to work with Parker Schnabel in season 4 in the Klondike. Left the show after season 5.
2 – 7	Dave Turin (age 52)	A guest star for several episodes of season 1, Turin became a full-time member during season 2. He is an experienced quarry foreman. Todd Hoffman convinced him to chase his gold mining dream, join the group, and take some time off from his family's business. After a season 7 filled with frustration and Turin's involvement in a fist fight, his retirement was announced on the March 17 episode. In the 8th season, in a Gold Rush special episode named "Dozer Dave", Turin announced his wish to get together his own "Turin Crew" to mine with family members from his Oregon-based quarry. He specifically named a desire to mine with his father as repayment for trusting him throughout the years during Gold Rush. Turin and his mining team became the subject of another spin-off, Gold Rush: Dave Turin's Lost Mine, which first aired in early 2019.
1 – 6	John Schnabel (age 96)	Recurring guest star, owner of Big Nugget mine and grandfather of Parker Schnabel and Payson Schnabel. He died in his sleep on March 18, 2016.
2 –	Gary Grogan	Recurring guest star, employee at Big Nugget mine.
1–8	Jim Thurber	Camp Safety Officer for Todd Hoffman, in season 1 frequently clashes with various crew members over his concerns regarding their mining operation.

== Locations ==
Alaskan Panhandle
Alaska, United States

- Jim Nail Placer Mine, a tributary of the Klehini River in the Chilkat Valley, on the east bank of Porcupine Creek, the closest airport being in Haines, Alaska. When the Hoffmans arrived at Porcupine Creek in season 1, the mine was unnamed. In season 2, "Dakota" Fred Hurt purchased the Porcupine Creek Mine and renamed it the Jim Nail Placer Mine (Coordinates: 59°25′6.91″N 136°13′48″W).
- Big Nugget Mine "Emerson Trench" along the west bank of Porcupine Creek; Smith Creek / Smith Creek Hill and the Discovery Claim further up the valley (Coordinates: 59°24′52.15″N 136°14′2.83″W)

The Klondike
Yukon, Canada in the Klondike Region, near Dawson City.

- Quartz Creek Mine, outside of Dawson City: on Quartz Creek, at the confluence with Toronto Creek and Calder Creek, 1 km North-west of Indian River Mine. (Coordinates: 63°45′41.74″N 139°6′53.70″W).
- Indian River Mine, 2 miles from Quartz Creek Mine, on the Indian River 36 km South-west of Dawson City (Coordinates: 63°45′16.16″N 139°8′43.45″W).
- McKinnon Creek Mine, 28 miles South of Dawson between McKinnon and Montana Creek. Leased from Klondike Gold Corp. (Coordinates: 63°41′45″N 138°59′49″W).
- Scribner Creek Mine, 33 miles Southeast of Dawson City at the confluence of Scribner Creek and the Indian River. Leased from Tony Beets' company, Tamarack, Inc. (Coordinates: 63°37′07″N 138°42′29″W).
- Eureka Creek Mine, 30 miles SSE of Dawson City at the confluence of Eureka Creek and the Indian River. Owned by Tamarack, Inc. (Coordinates: 63°37′37″N 138°49′13″W).

Guyana
The Jungle, near Mahdia, Guyana, South America on the Potaro River

- Q.O.D. Claim (Coordinates [approx.] 5°22′45″N 59°07′46″W)
  - Maple Creek Cut, claim-jumped prior to Season 4
  - Patience Creek Cut
  - Redemption Creek Cut
  - Hope Creek Cut

Oregon
Baker County, 18 miles SSW of Baker City on west bench of Pine Creek

- High Bar Mine (Coordinates: 44°31′30.54″N 117°55′25.43″W).

Colorado
Fairplay, Park County, 2 miles NW of Fairplay, south of Middle Fork of South Platte River

- Katuska Pit, (gravel pit) (or Freedom Plant) 1215 Platte Drive, Fairplay, Colorado (Coordinates: 39°13′36.60″N 106°00′40.84″W).

== Reception ==
As of its first-season finale, Gold Rush: Alaska was the most-watched Friday night program in all of US television among males aged 18 to 49 and women aged 25 to 54. For 13 consecutive weeks in its second season, Gold Rush continued to hold Friday's top rating in the demographic of men aged 18 to 49. With Gold Rush leading the way, Discovery wrapped a dominant first quarter in key male demographics, including a stranglehold among the rankings for top unscripted cable programs.

For the December 28, 2015, to March 27, 2016, ratings period, Discovery stood number one among non-sports cable networks in its target demographic of men aged 25 to 54. It claimed eight of the top ten reality shows in this group, including the top three — Gold Rush (1.89 million), Fast N' Loud (1.20 million) and Alaskan Bush People (1.18 million). Discovery also dominated the cable unscripted rankers in other male categories. It claimed seven of the top ten in men aged 18 to 49 and five of the top ten in the younger men aged 18 to 34 demographic, with Gold Rush on top in both.

== See also ==
- Gold mining in Alaska
- Yukon Gold, a canceled similar Canadian reality TV series with placer gold mining in the Cassiar and Atlin districts of British Columbia and the Klondike, Yukon.
- Aussie Gold Hunters, a similar Australian reality TV show on Discovery Channel Australia, about placer gold mining in the states of Western Australia, Victoria, and Queensland
- Bering Sea Gold, a similar reality TV show to White Water, except scuba mining at sea instead of in a creek
- Reclaimed (TV series), a similar reality TV show to Freddy Dodge's Mine Rescue
- Jungle Gold, a similar reality TV show on Discovery Channel
