= Gold Rush: Winter's Fortune =

American reality television series

- Starring: Tony Beets; Fred Lewis; Dustin Hurt; Dave Turin; Rick Ness; Minnie Beets; Mike Beets; Monica Beets; Khara Lewis; Carlos Minor; Juan Ibara
- Narrated by: Paul Christie (season 1)
- Country of origin: United States
- Original language: English
- No. of seasons: 1
- No. of episodes: 8

Production
- Running time: 60 minutes
- Production company: Raw TV

Original release
- Network: Discovery
- Release: July 30 – September 10, 2021

Related
- Gold Rush, Gold Rush: White Water, Gold Rush: Dave Turin's Lost Mine, Gold Rush: Mine Rescue with Freddy & Juan, Hoffman Family Gold, Bering Sea Gold, Ice Cold Gold, Jungle Gold, America’s Backyard Gold, Yukon Gold

Gold Rush: Winter's Fortune is a spin-off of the reality television series Gold Rush It premiered on July 30, 2021. Tony Beets, Rick Ness, Dave Turin, Fred Lewis, and Dustin Hurt start the off-season prospecting, scouting, and preparing for the 2021 season because of high gold prices due to the COVID-19 pandemic. Winter's Fortune mainly took place in the Yukon and Alaska.

== Cast ==
- Tony Beets, gold mine owner
- Fed Lewis, gold mine owner
- Dustin Hurt, gold mine owner
- Dave Turin, gold mine owner
- Rick Ness, gold mine owner
- Minnie Beets, bookkeeper
- Mike Beets, gold plant manager
- Monica Beets, heavy machine operator
- Khara Lewis
- Carlos Minor, diver
- Juan Ibarra, mechanic and metal fabricator

== Episodes ==
No.	Title	Original release date	U.S. viewers (millions)
1	"The Race Starts Now"	July 30, 2021 (Discovery)	1.06
2	"Bigger is Better"	August 6, 2021 (Discovery)	0.88
3	"Force of Nature"	August 13, 2021 (Discovery)	1.18
4	"Gold Moves"	August 20, 2021 (Discovery)	1.12
5	"The Klondike Beast"	August 27, 2021 (Discovery)	1.09
6	"Trapped"	September 3, 2021 (Discovery)	1.29
7	"A Hole Lotta Trouble"	September 10, 2021 (Discovery)	1.25
8	"Into the Breach"	September 10, 2021 (Discovery)	1.34
