= Gold Rush: Mine Rescue with Freddy & Juan =

American television series

- Starring: Freddy Dodge; Juan Ibarra
- Narrated by: Paul Christie (season 1 –present)
- Country of origin: United States
- Original language: English
- No. of seasons: 6
- No. of episodes: 52

Production
- Executive producers: James Bates, Carter Figueroa, John Slaughter
- Running time: 60 minutes
- Production company: Raw TV

Original release
- Network: Discovery+
- Release: January 4, 2021 – present

Related
- Gold Rush, Gold Rush: White Water, Gold Rush: Dave Turin's Lost Mine, Gold Rush: Winter's Fortune, Hoffman Family Gold, Bering Sea Gold, Ice Cold Gold, Jungle Gold, America’s Backyard Gold, Yukon Gold

Gold Rush: Mine Rescue with Freddy & Juan is a reality television series that airs on the Discovery Channel. It was initially titled Gold Rush: Freddy Dodge’s Mine Rescue and the first season initially aired on Discovery+. A spin-off of Gold Rush, gold recovery experts Freddy Dodge and Juan Ibarra, help struggling miners by improving their wash plants and scouting for better ground on their claims. The series debuted in 2021, and six seasons have been aired through mid-2026.

== Locations ==
United States

Region	Locations (season number)
Southern	North Carolina (4)
Western	Alaska (1, 2, 3, 6), Arizona (1, 4, 5, 6), California (4, 6), Colorado (1, 2, 3, 6), Idaho (3, 6), Nevada (3), Montana (2, 3, 4, 5, 6), Oregon (1, 2, 3, 4, 5), (Washington (state)) Washington (5)

Canada

Region	Locations (season number)
Western Canada	British Columbia (2, 3, 4, 5, 6), Yukon (2, 6)

== Cast ==
=== Current cast ===
Seasons	Name	Details
1–present	Freddy Dodge	Gold recovery expert, professional prospector
1–present	Juan Ibarra	Gold recovery expert, master fabricator

== Episodes ==
=== Series overview ===
Season	Episodes	Originally released	
Season	Episodes	First released	Last released
1	6	January 4, 2021	January 22, 2021
2	11	March 18, 2022	May 13, 2022
3	13	June 16, 2023	September 15, 2023
4	12	August 9, 2024	October 25, 2024
5	8	May 9, 2025	July 18, 2025
6	11	February 13, 2026	May 1, 2026

=== Season 1 ===
No. overall	No. in season	Title	Original release date	U.S. viewers (millions) (Note: Only for television broadcast on Discovery Channel)
1	1	"Last Chance Gold"	January 4, 2021 (Discovery+)	N/A
2	2	"For Pete's Sake"	January 4, 2021 (Discovery+); April 2, 2021 (Discovery Channel)	1.39
3	3	"The Gold Devil"	January 4, 2021 (Discovery+); April 9, 2021 (Discovery Channel)	1.28
4	4	"Young Guns"	January 8, 2021 (Discovery+); April 2, 2021 (Discovery Channel)	1.24
5	5	"A Fine Mess"	January 15, 2021 (Discovery+); April 16, 2021 (Discovery Channel)	1.50
6	6	"Sink or Swim"	January 22, 2021 (Discovery+); April 23, 2021 (Discovery Channel)	1.49

=== Season 2 ===
No. overall	No. in season	Title	Original release date	U.S. viewers (millions) (Note: Only for television broadcast on Discovery Channel)
7	Special	"Bonanza or Bust"	March 18, 2022	0.68
8	1	"A Golden Promise"	April 1, 2022	1.38
9	2	"The Trommageddon"	April 8, 2022	1.16
10	3	"Dial F for Freddy"	April 8, 2022	0.92
11	4	"Family Fortune"	April 15, 2022	1.32
12	5	"Busch Creek or Bust"	April 15, 2022	1.27
13	6	"The Gold Thief"	April 22, 2022	1.33
14	7	"Freddy’s Gamble"	April 22, 2022	1.21
15	8	"The Gold Wizard"	April 29, 2022	1.02
16	9	"For Love of Nuggets"	May 6, 2022	1.22
17	10	"Legend of Freddy and Juan"	May 13, 2022	0.97

=== Season 3 ===
No. overall	No. in season	Title	Original release date	U.S. viewers (millions) (Note: Only for television broadcast on Discovery Channel)
18	Special	"30,000 Miles to Gold"	June 16, 2023	0.43
19	1	"Old Dog, New Tricks"	June 23, 2023	0.72
20	2	"High Country Hail Mary"	June 30, 2023	N/A
21	3	"Married to the Mine"	July 7, 2023	N/A
22	4	"The Nugget Factor"	July 14, 2023	N/A
23	5	"True Gold"	July 21, 2023	N/A
24	6	"Golden Boy"	August 4, 2023	N/A
25	7	"Brothers in Arms"	August 11, 2023	N/A
26	8	"Rags to Riches"	August 18, 2023	N/A
27	9	"Home is Where the Gold is"	August 25, 2023	N/A
28	10	"Gold Habits Die Hard"	September 1, 2023	N/A
29	11	"Army of Juan"	September 8, 2023	N/A
30	Special	"The Lost Rescue"	September 15, 2023	N/A

=== Season 4 ===
No. overall	No. in season	Title	Original release date	U.S. viewers (millions) (Note: Only for television broadcast on Discovery Channel)
31	Special	"For Family and Fortune"	August 9, 2024	0.37
32	1	"Valley of Riches"	August 16, 2024	0.66
33	2	"Grand Canyon Gold Gamble"	August 23, 2024	0.70
34	3	"Bust or Gold Boom"	August 30, 2024	0.76
35	4	"Carolina Gold"	September 6, 2024	0.67
36	5	"Dry or Die"	September 13, 2024	0.70
37	6	"Nature’s ATM"	September 20, 2024	0.84
38	7	"Fire on the Mountain"	September 27, 2024	0.85
39	8	"Zeroes to Golden Heroes"	October 4, 2024	0.79
40	9	"Monsoon Millions"	October 11, 2024	0.77
41	10	"School of Hard Rocks"	October 18, 2024	0.75
42	Special	"Pay Dirt to Profit"	October 25, 2024	0.45

=== Season 5 ===
No. overall	No. in season	Title	Original release date	U.S. viewers (millions) (Note: Only for television broadcast on Discovery Channel)
43	1	"Pipe Dreams"	May 9, 2025	0.57
44	2	"Gold Today, Gone Tomorrow"	May 16, 2025	0.54
45	3	"Blue Channel Gold"	May 23, 2025	0.54
46	4	"The Goldie Locks"	May 30, 2025	0.61
47	5	"All the Pretty Gold"	June 6, 2025	0.56
48	Special	"Tricks of the Mine"	June 13, 2025	0.52
49	6	"Shake, Rattle and Gold"	June 20, 2025	0.59
50	7	"The Jig is Up"	June 27, 2025	0.58
51	Special	"Mining Miracles"	July 4, 2025	0.45
52	8	"Truth or Dare"	July 11, 2025	0.48

=== Season 6 ===
No. overall	No. in season	Title	Original release date	U.S. viewers (millions) (Note: Only for television broadcast on Discovery Channel)
53	1	"Great Klondike Gold Hunt"	February 13, 2026	N/A
54	2	"Last Stand in Silver City"	February 20, 2026	N/A
55	3	"Firestorm Fortunes"	February 27, 2026	N/A
56	4	"Million-Dollar Mine Mayhem"	March 6, 2026	N/A
57	5	"Bedrock Bottom"	March 13, 2026	N/A
58	6	"It's a Hard Rock Life"	March 20, 2026	N/A
59	7	"Bear Down"	March 27, 2026	N/A
60	8	"Double Trouble"	April 3, 2026	N/A
61	Special	"The Lost Tapes"	April 10, 2026	N/A
62	9	"Taming the Monster"	April 17, 2026	N/A
62	10	"Desert Storm"	April 24, 2026	N/A
63	11	"Forty Days to Fail or Fortune"	May 1, 2026	N/A
