= Gold Rush: Dave Turin's Lost Mine =

American television series

- Starring: Dave Turin; Jason Sanchez; Casey Morgan; Chris Taylor; Nathan Clark; Jesse Goins; Shelly Turin
- Narrated by: Paul Christie (season 1 – season 4)
- Country of origin: United States
- Original language: English
- No. of seasons: 4
- No. of episodes: 69

Production
- Executive producers: Peter Campion, Sam Maynard, John Slaughter
- Running time: 60 minutes
- Production company: Raw TV

Original release
- Network: Discovery+
- Release: March 8, 2019 – September 16, 2022

Related
- Gold Rush, Gold Rush: White Water, Gold Rush: Mine Rescue with Freddy & Juan, Gold Rush: Winter's Fortune, Hoffman Family Gold, Bering Sea Gold, Ice Cold Gold, Jungle Gold, America’s Backyard Gold, Yukon Gold

This spin-off series followed Dave Turin, formerly of the Hoffman crew, as he looked to start new mining operations at disused gold mines in the Western United States. Dave Turin set up Golden Streets Mining LLC as the mining company for this venture. The series debuted in March 2019 (the mining took place in 2018), centering on a placer mine along Lynx Creek near Prescott Valley, Arizona (season gold total 80oz, $96,000). In 2020 (the mining took place in 2019), the show's second season ran from February to April, with eight episodes centering on a placer mine along Silver Creek in Birdseye, near Marysville, Montana (season gold total 225.1oz, $340,000). In 2021 (the mining took place in 2020), the show's third season ran 16 episodes from March to July, centering on a placer mine along Box Creek in Lake County, Colorado for 12 weeks (gold total 426.8oz, $810,000) before moving back to Lynx Creek in Arizona for the last four weeks (gold total 174oz; whole season gold total 600.95oz, over $1,000,000). In 2022 (the mining took place in 2021), the show's fourth season ran 16 episodes from May to September, centering on a placer mine along Glacier Creek in the Chugach Census Area, near Valdez, Alaska, for 13 out of 20 weeks (season gold total 463oz, over $800,000).

In 2022, Dave Turin began the process of selling the Valdez Glacier Creek claim to Nathan Clark and Jason Sanchez, 2 members of his crew from the beginning of this spin-off series, as Dave retires from mining. This process aired in 2023 (the mining took place in 2022; season gold total 29.75oz), as part of the regular Gold Rush TV series; there being no Dave Turin's Lost Mine season for the wind-up.

== Tragedies ==
On October 5, 2018, production assistant Terrence Woods Jr. disappeared from the set after a day of filming at Penman Mine in the Nez Perce-Clearwater National Forest in Idaho. He has never been found.

On 18 August 2020, Jesse Goins suffered a fatal heart attack during filming of the third season of the show.

During the filming of the fourth season, Casey learned his wife and her brother had gone missing while hiking in the Grand Canyon. They were later both found safe.

== Locations ==
- Season 1 - Lynx Creek near Prescott Valley, Arizona
- Season 2 - Silver Creek in Birdseye, near Marysville, Montana
- Season 3 - Box Creek in Lake County, Colorado
- Season 4 - Glacier Creek in the Chugach Census Area, near Valdez, Alaska

== Cast ==
Seasons	Name	Position
1–4	Dave Turin	Quarry and Mining Expert
1–4	Jason Sanchez	Excavator Operator
1-4	Casey Morgan	Rock Truck Driver
1-4	Chris Taylor	Loader Operator
1-4	Nathan Clark	Mechanic
1-3	Jesse Goins	Gold Room Operator
1-4	Shelly Turin	Gold Room Operator

== Episodes ==
=== Series overview ===
Season	Episodes	Originally released	
Season	Episodes	First released	Last released
1	4	April 5, 2019	April 26, 2019
2	8	February 21, 2020	April 10, 2020
3	16	March 19, 2021	July 2, 2021
4	16	May 20, 2022	September 9, 2022

=== Season 1 ===
No. overall	No. in season	Title	Original release date	U.S. viewers (millions) (Note: Only for television broadcast on Discovery Channel)
1	Special	"Return to the Yukon"	March 8, 2019 (Discovery+)	N/A
2	Special	"Nevada Nuggets"	March 8, 2019 (Discovery+)	N/A
3	Special	"The Hunt for Flour Gold"	March 8, 2019 (Discovery+)	N/A
4	Special	"Montana Motherlode"	March 8, 2019 (Discovery+)	N/A
5	Special	"Chasing Big Canyon’s Gold"	March 8, 2019 (Discovery+)	N/A
6	Special	"Desert Dredge Mystery"	March 8, 2019 (Discovery+)	N/A
7	Special	"Lincoln’s Arizona Gold"	March 8, 2019 (Discovery+)	N/A
8	1	"Dozer Dave Returns"	April 5, 2019 (Discovery)	1.23
9	2	"Rookie Mistakes"	April 12, 2019 (Discovery)	1.33
10	3	"Paydirt Mystery"	April 19, 2019 (Discovery)	1.19
11	4	"Last Chance Cut"	April 26, 2019 (Discovery)	1.21

=== Season 2 ===
No. overall	No. in season	Title	Original release date	U.S. viewers (millions) (Note: Only for television broadcast on Discovery Channel)
12	Special	"Golden Playbook"	January 17, 2020	1.38
13	Special	"Lost War Gold"	January 24, 2020	N/A
14	Special	"Ghost Town Gold"	January 24, 2020	1.67
15	1	"Rocky Mountain Gold"	February 21, 2020	2.08
16	Special	"Birdseye Bounty"	February 21, 2020	N/A
17	Special	"Gold & Gems"	February 21, 2020	N/A
18	2	"Big Bowl Bet"	February 28, 2020	1.59
19	Special	"Deal or No Deal"	February 28, 2020	N/A
20	3	"Vanishing Gold"	March 6, 2020	1.92
21	4	"Gold Will Surrender"	March 13, 2020	1.37
22	Special	"Miller Mountain Discovery"	March 13, 2020	N/A
23	5	"Back on Gold"	March 20, 2020	1.83
24	6	"Boundary Blowout"	March 27, 2020	1.74
25	Special	"Mountain of Gold"	March 27, 2020	N/A
26	7	"Blue Room Bonanza"	April 3, 2020	1.89
27	Special	"Freezing Gold"	April 3, 2020	N/A
28	8	"All In"	April 10, 2020	1.68
29	Special	"A Birdseye Brotherhood"	April 17, 2020	1.27
30	Special	"The United States of Gold"	April 24, 2020	1.38
31	Special	"Lost Miner Lockdown"	May 29, 2020	0.69

=== Season 3 ===
No. overall	No. in season	Title	Original release date	U.S. viewers (millions) (Note: Only for television broadcast on Discovery Channel)
32	Special	"The Million Dollar Claim"	March 12, 2021	1.00
33	1	"Mountain of Gold"	March 19, 2021	1.47
34	2	"Say a Prayer"	March 26, 2021	1.19
35	3	"The Fifty Ounce Test"	April 2, 2021	N/A
36	4	"Gold Vault Gamble"	April 9, 2021	1.23
37	Special	"The Midas Touch"	April 9, 2021	1.01
38	5	"No Country for Gold Men"	April 16, 2021	1.43
39	Special	"The Golden Rules"	April 16, 2021	0.87
40	6	"Let There Be Gold"	April 23, 2021	1.53
41	7	"Good Man Down"	April 30, 2021	1.21
42	8	"Forged in Fire"	May 7, 2021	1.09
43	9	"Enter the Promised Land"	May 14, 2021	1.24
44	10	"Winter's Warning"	May 21, 2021	1.26
45	11	"X Marks the Spot"	May 28, 2021	1.25
46	12	"Million Dollar Gamble"	June 4, 2021	1.23
47	13	"Arizona Crush"	June 11, 2021	1.26
48	14	"The Curse of Lost Mine Gold"	June 18, 2021	1.38
49	15	"Shock and Ore"	June 25, 2021	1.13
50	16	"End Game"	July 2, 2021	1.12
51	Special	"How to Mine a Million"	July 9, 2021	0.71

=== Season 4 ===
No. overall	No. in season	Title	Original release date	U.S. viewers (millions) (Note: Only for television broadcast on Discovery Channel)
52	Special	"Bleed Gold"	May 13, 2022	0.82
53	1	"Turin's Gamble"	May 20, 2022	1.01
54	2	"Ends of the Earth"	May 27, 2022	0.96
55	3	"Valley of Glacier Gold"	June 3, 2022	0.98
56	4	"Alaskan Hope"	June 10, 2022	0.96
57	5	"Double Trouble"	June 17, 2022	N/A
58	6	"Trial by Water"	June 24, 2022	0.95
59	7	"H2 … Oh No"	July 1, 2022	0.98
60	8	"The Eagle Has Landed"	July 8, 2022	1.02
61	9	"Fight or Flight"	July 15, 2022	0.99
62	10	"Clash of the Cuts"	July 22, 2022	0.92
63	11	"Crisis at the Creek"	August 5, 2022	0.86
64	12	"Shadow of Denali"	August 12, 2022	0.84
65	13	"On the Gold Again"	August 19, 2022	0.87
66	14	"Cowboys & Dreamers"	August 26, 2022	0.81
67	15	"Risky Business"	September 2, 2022	0.81
68	16	"Gold Favors the Bold"	September 9, 2022	0.68
69	Special	"The Longest Prospect"	September 16, 2022	0.60
