= Anway =

Anway is a surname. Notable people with the surname include:

- Carol E. Anway (born 1965), American industrial physicist
- Charles H. Anway (1857–1949), American pioneering homesteader near Haines, Alaska
- Susan Anway (1951–2021), American musician, vocalist for The Magnetic Fields

== See also ==
- Peter Anway, fictional character in The Disaster Artist (film)
- Amway, a multi-level marketing company
