= National Register of Historic Places listings in Haines Borough, Alaska =

Location of the Haines Borough in Alaska

This is a list of the National Register of Historic Places listings in Haines Borough, Alaska.

This is intended to be a complete list of the properties and districts on the National Register of Historic Places in Haines Borough, Alaska, United States. The locations of National Register properties and districts for which the latitude and longitude coordinates are included below, may be seen in a Google map.

There are six properties and districts listed on the National Register in the borough, including one National Historic Landmark.

This National Park Service list is complete through NPS recent listings posted July 17, 2026.

== Current listings ==
	Name on the Register	Image	Date listed	Location	City or town	Description
1	Charlie Anway Cabin		September 14, 2001 (#01000967)	Mile 1.5 on the Haines Highway; 59°14′27″N 135°28′45″W	Haines	
2	Eldred Rock Lighthouse	Eldred Rock Lighthouse	December 30, 1975 (#75000332)	20 miles (32 km) south of Haines, east of Sullivan Island in Lynn Canal; 58°58′15″N 135°13′13″W	Haines	
3	Fort William H. Seward	Fort William H. Seward	April 11, 1972 (#72000190)	Port Chilkoot, about 0.5 miles (0.80 km) south of Haines, Alaska; 59°13′37″N 135°26′38″W	Haines	
4	Government Indian School		February 8, 1980 (#80000756)	1st Avenue, between Union Street and View Street. 59°14′16″N 135°26′35″W	Haines	
5	Pleasant Camp	Pleasant Camp	July 5, 1973 (#73000376)	Mile 40 on the Haines Highway, near US-Canadian border 59°27′00″N 136°21′46″W	Haines	Also known as the Dalton Trail Camp, it was an outpost of the Canadian Northwest Mounted Police in the late 19th century.
6	Porcupine District	Porcupine District	November 13, 1976 (#76000358)	1 mile (1.6 km) southwest of Mile 35 of Haines Highway, across Klehini River; 59°25′20″N 136°14′14″W	Haines	Mining camp mostly active in the early 20th century.

== See also ==
- List of National Historic Landmarks in Alaska
- National Register of Historic Places listings in Alaska
