= Pleasant Camp =

Pleasant Camp may refer to:

- Pleasant Camp, British Columbia, hamlet in Atlin District
- Pleasant Camp (Haines, Alaska), historic frontier police outpost
