= Gold Rush: White Water =

American television series

- Dustin Hurt (left) and "Dakota" Fred Hurt
- Starring: Dustin Hurt; “Dakota” Fred Hurt; Paul Richardson; Wes Richardson; Carlos Minor; James Hamm; Ryan Cardoza; Scott Allen; Kayla Johansson; Justin Peterson
- Narrated by: Bray Poor (seasons 1–3); Paul Christie (seasons 4–9)
- Country of origin: United States
- Original language: English
- No. of seasons: 9
- No. of episodes: 119

Production
- Executive producer: James Bates
- Production locations: Chilkat Range, Haines Borough, Alaska
- Running time: 60 minutes
- Production company: Raw TV

Original release
- Network: Discovery Channel
- Release: January 19, 2018 – July 18, 2025

Related
- Gold Rush, Gold Rush: Dave Turin's Lost Mine, Gold Rush: Winter's Fortune, Gold Rush: Mine Rescue with Freddy & Juan, Hoffman Family Gold, Bering Sea Gold, Ice Cold Gold

Gold Rush: White Water is an American reality television series that aired on the Discovery Channel. A spin-off of Gold Rush, the series followed placer gold miners "Dakota" Fred Hurt and his son Dustin Hurt, in their return to the wilderness of Haines Borough, Alaska, to seek their fortune by suction dredge diving within its raging whitewater creeks. The series debuted in 2018, and eight seasons aired through mid-2024. It was announced that season nine (2025), filmed in 2024, would be the last season of the show.

"Dakota" Fred Hurt died from brain cancer on July 11, 2023, a day after his 80th birthday.

== Cast ==
=== Main cast members ===
Seasons	Name	Details
1–9	Dustin Hurt	Gold miner, claim owner, carpenter; dredge diver, dredge tender, airboat operator; Fred Hurt's son, one of "The Dakota Boys".
1–8	"Dakota" Fred Hurt (July 10, 1943 – July 11, 2023)	Gold miner, claim owner, gold cleaner, fabricator; diver with 15 years' experience, dredge diver, dredge tender; Dustin Hurt's father, one of "The Dakota Boys". Died on July 11, 2023, at age 80 after being diagnosed with brain cancer four months earlier.
1–9	Paul Richardson	Gold miner, dredge diver, dredge tender, fabricator; husband to Kayla Sheets, brother of Wes Richardson, one of "The Texans".
1–9	Wes Richardson	Gold miner, fabricator, mechanic, airboat operator, gold cleaner; brother of Paul Richardson, one of "The Texans".
1–9	Carlos Minor	Professional diver with 15 years diving in the U.S. Marines (becoming a drill instructor) and 13 years' oil platform diving experience in the Gulf of Mexico; dredge diver, dredge tender; season 1 representative of Todd Hoffman.
2	Rich Webster	Gold miner, 5 years experience as a U.S. Army mechanic, electronics expert, 5 years experience suction gold dredge diving in Alaska; dredge diver, gold cleaner.
2	K.C. "Casey" Morgan	U.S. Marine veteran and Arizona gold miner with 10 years experience suction gold dredge diving; dredge diver.
3–9	James Hamm	Washington State gold miner; 5 years experience working as a professional suction gold dredge diver in the Bering Sea offshore of Nome, Alaska; dredge diver, dredge tender, off-road driver, airboat operator, gold cleaner, the "Gold Hound", hired by Dustin Hurt.
3	Kayla Sheets	Rookie dredge tender, mini dredge operator, rookie dredge diver; Jen Hurt's daughter, Zack Sheets' sister, Fred Hurt's step-daughter, wife to Paul Richardson; hired by "Dakota" Fred.
3–4	Ryan Cardoza	Gold miner from Willow, Alaska; 6 years experience recreational suction gold dredge diving in Oregon and Alaska; dredge diver, hired by Fred Hurt.
4–7	Scott Allen	Commercial diver from Battle Creek, Michigan; U.S. Marine veteran, firefighter, logger; rookie dredge diver, fabricator, rookie dredge tender, airboat operator, hired by Fred Hurt in season 4, then Dustin Hurt for Kayla Johanson's dive team in season 5.
5–7	Kayla Johanson	Gold miner from North Carolina; 14 years total experience working as a suction gold dredge diver (8 years in Arizona and 6 years in southeast Alaska); dive team leader, dredge diver, dredge tender, gold cleaner, hired by Dustin Hurt to lead the 2nd dive team in season 5.
5	Mark Stamper	Gold miner, diver, firefighter; 2 years experience working as a professional suction gold dredge diver in the Bering Sea offshore of Nome, Alaska; dredge diver, dredge tender, hired by Dustin Hurt for Kayla Johanson's dive team.
6–7	Justin Peterson	Gold miner from Wasilla, Alaska; 30 years experience working as a placer gold miner; construction worker, powerlifter; dredge diver, rookie dredge tender, fabricator, gold cleaner, hired by Kayla Johanson for her dive team in season 6.
1, 2, 9	Danielle Miller	Alaska-born heavy equipment operator (20 years experience), construction explosives expert, some open water diving experience; rookie dredge diver (season 9), rookie dredge tender (season 9); Dustin Hurt's girlfriend, Hurt–Sheets wedding guest, Minor wedding guest.

=== Minor cast members ===
Seasons	Name	Details
1–4, 8	Jennifer 'Jen' Hurt, née Sheets	Fred Hurt's fiancée, then wife, mother to Zack and Kayla Sheets; season 2 McKinley Camp cook.
1	Zack Sheets	Miner, Season 1; general laborer; Jen Hurt's son, Fred Hurt's step-son, Kayla’s brother, Dustin's step-brother.
1	Todd Hoffman	Investor in The Trifecta Claim with $50,000 invested.
1	Hudson Hoffman	One of Todd Hoffman's sons.
1	Tony Beets	Hurt family friend; Hurt–Sheets wedding guest.
1	Minnie Beets	Hurt family friend; Hurt–Sheets wedding guest.
1, 3	Darla Hurt	Eldest daughter of "Dakota" Fred and sister of Dustin; Hurt–Sheets wedding guest, Richardson-Sheets wedding guest.
1, 3	Pastor Darryl Hurt	Fred's eldest son and Dustin's older brother; Hurt–Sheets wedding celebrant, Richardson–Sheets wedding celebrant.
2, 4	Mary Wilcock	Helicopter pilot, aerial long-line cargo hauler.
2, 3, 9	Teresa Garcia Minor	Carlos Minor's wife, Richardson-Sheets wedding guest.
3, 5	John "Jag" Garrard	Helicopter pilot with 40 years flying experience, aerial long-line cargo hauler.
5, 6, 8	Mark Sebens	Alaska placer gold miner at a claim in upper Porcupine Creek; an upstream neighbor to "Dakota" Fred Hurt's claim at Porcupine Creek Mine.
5	Eric Foster	U.S. Navy veteran and recreational gold miner in California; 17 years experience commercial diving; rookie dredge diver, rookie dredge tender, hired by Dustin Hurt for Kayla Johanson's dive team.
5	Lucas Merli	Raw TV film crew safety officer.
5	Marty Fowler	Raw TV drone operator, aerial photographer.
7	Al Gilliam	Alaska placer gold miner, former owner of the Nugget Creek claims; resident of Haines since 1976; prospector, former logger, and former professional hunting guide.
8	Brian Alldridge	Raw TV drone operator

== Episodes ==
=== Series overview ===
Season	Episodes	Originally released	
Season	Episodes	First released	Last released
1	8	January 19, 2018	March 16, 2018
2	10	January 4, 2019	March 8, 2019
3	13	November 8, 2019	February 14, 2020
4	15	November 13, 2020	March 12, 2021
5	16	November 5, 2021	March 18, 2022
6	8	November 11, 2022	December 30, 2022
7	9	April 14, 2023	June 9, 2023
8	12	March 8, 2024	May 17, 2024
9	12	April 25, 2025	July 18, 2025

=== Season 1 ===
No. overall	No. in season	Title	Original release date	U.S. viewers (millions)
1	1	"Between Craziness & Insanity"	January 19, 2018	1.93
2	2	"First Gold"	January 26, 2018	2.04
3	3	"Dredge Down"	February 2, 2018	2.01
4	4	"Boulder Battles"	February 16, 2018	1.81
5	5	"Inland Tsunami"	February 23, 2018	1.76
6	6	"Hypothermia"	March 2, 2018	1.68
7	7	"The Graboid"	March 9, 2018	1.75
8	8	"End of Days"	March 16, 2018	1.52
9	Special	"Hidden Depths"	March 23, 2018	1.25

=== Season 2 ===
No. overall	No. in season	Title	Original release date	U.S. viewers (millions)
10	Special	"The Dakota's vs Alaska"	December 28, 2018	1.01
11	1	"The Dakota's Strike Back"	January 4, 2019	1.70
12	2	"Burned Alive"	January 11, 2019	1.87
13	3	"When Bears Attack"	January 18, 2019	1.71
14	4	"Too Close For Comfort"	January 25, 2019	1.83
15	5	"The Nugget Trap"	February 1, 2019	1.86
16	6	"McKinley, We Have A Problem"	February 8, 2019	1.65
17	7	"Sacrifice & Sabotage"	February 15, 2019	1.86
18	8	"Landslide"	February 22, 2019	1.91
19	9	"The Widow Maker"	March 1, 2019	1.87
20	10	"Gold Strike"	March 8, 2019	2.11
21	Special	"Diving Deeper"	March 22, 2019	1.30

=== Season 3 ===
No. overall	No. in season	Title	Original release date	U.S. viewers (millions)
22	Special	"The Golden Guys"	November 1, 2019	1.33
23	1	"Two Teams, One Dream"	November 8, 2019	1.52
24	2	"The Pound Zone"	November 15, 2019	1.51
25	3	"No Guts, No Glory Holes"	November 22, 2019	1.72
26	4	"Enter The Superclaw"	November 29, 2019	1.62
27	5	"Birthday Gold"	December 6, 2019	1.37
28	6	"The Gold Cave"	December 13, 2019	1.40
29	7	"Nugget Heaven"	December 20, 2019	1.82
30	8	"Thunderfalls"	January 10, 2020	1.62
31	9	"End Of The Rainbow"	January 17, 2020	1.85
32	10	"Cliffhanger"	January 24, 2020	2.16
33	11	"Rockfall Ravine"	January 31, 2020	1.61
34	12	"Hands Full of Gold"	February 7, 2020	1.61
35	13	"Royal Flush"	February 14, 2020	1.58
36	Special	"On the Brink"	June 12, 2020	1.00

=== Season 4 ===
No. overall	No. in season	Title	Original release date	U.S. viewers (millions)
37	Special	"White Water Roulette"	November 6, 2020	1.38
38	1	"Come Hell or High Water"	November 13, 2020	1.64
39	2	"Good As Gold"	November 20, 2020	1.72
40	3	"Swallowed Up"	November 27, 2020	1.77
41	4	"Enter the Mammoth Claw"	December 4, 2020	1.75
42	5	"Fistful of Nuggets"	December 11, 2020	1.65
43	6	"Rookie Mistakes"	December 18, 2020	1.86
44	7	"Happy Endings"	January 8, 2021	1.63
45	8	"Dustin To The Rescue"	January 22, 2021	1.68
46	9	"Depths Of Despair"	January 29, 2021	1.76
47	10	"Ride Or Die"	February 5, 2021	1.47
48	11	"A Special Kind Of Crazy"	February 12, 2021	1.64
49	Special	"Walk The Line"	February 12, 2021	0.90
50	12	"In Too Deep"	February 19, 2021	1.69
51	13	"Under Pressure"	February 26, 2021	1.60
52	14	"Buried Alive"	March 5, 2021	1.67
53	15	"To The Edge"	March 12, 2021	1.44

=== Season 5 ===
No. overall	No. in season	Title	Original release date	U.S. viewers (millions)
54	1	"Roll of the Ice"	November 5, 2021	N/A
55	2	"Fresh Blood"	November 12, 2021	1.25
56	3	"Shake Up"	November 19, 2021	1.14
57	Special	"Never Back Down"	November 19, 2021	N/A
58	4	"Who's The Boss?"	November 26, 2021	1.17
59	5	"Groundbreaking Gold"	December 3, 2021	1.33
60	6	"Boiling Point"	December 10, 2021	1.35
61	7	"Gamblin' Man"	December 17, 2021	1.26
62	8	"Hard Times at House Rock"	January 14, 2022	1.26
63	9	"Cut and Run"	January 21, 2022	1.33
64	10	"Robbery at House Rock"	January 28, 2022	1.31
65	Special	"Blood Runs Thicker Than Water"	February 4, 2022	0.75
66	11	"Curse of the Gold Gods"	February 11, 2022	1.24
67	12	"Blackout"	February 18, 2022	1.20
68	13	"The Motherload"	February 25, 2022	1.24
69	14	"Risk vs. Reward"	March 4, 2022	1.29
70	15	"A Golden Opportunity"	March 11, 2022	1.21
71	16	"The Last Stand"	March 18, 2022	1.34

=== Season 6 ===
No. overall	No. in season	Title	Original release date	U.S. viewers (millions)
72	Special	"Fist Full Of Nuggets"	November 4, 2022	0.72
73	1	"Fortune Favors the Bold"	November 11, 2022	0.96
74	2	"Into the Unknown"	November 18, 2022	1.05
75	3	"Airboat Accident"	November 25, 2022	0.99
76	4	"Dakota Fred Takes Charge"	December 2, 2022	0.92
77	5	"Homemade Highway to Hell"	December 9, 2022	1.01
78	6	"Fuelling the Pressure"	December 16, 2022	1.10
79	7	"At War with a Widowmaker"	December 23, 2022	1.08
80	8	"Explosion at Nugget Creek"	December 30, 2022	0.89

=== Season 7 ===
No. overall	No. in season	Title	Original release date	U.S. viewers (millions)
81	1	"Missing In Action"	April 14, 2023	0.61
82	2	"Total Annihilation"	April 21, 2023	0.71
83	3	"4-Ounce Nugget"	April 28, 2023	0.65
84	4	"Blood Red White Water"	May 5, 2023	0.64
85	5	"Risky Business"	May 12, 2023	0.63
86	6	"Mouth Of The Dragon"	May 19, 2023	0.79
87	7	"In Death's Shadow"	May 26, 2023	0.79
88	8	"Hell From The Heavens"	June 2, 2023	0.69
89	9	"Judgement Day"	June 9, 2023	0.53
90	Special	"Golden Goose Chase"	June 9, 2023	0.49

=== Season 8 ===
No. overall	No. in season	Title	Original release date	U.S. viewers (millions)
91	Special	"The Legend of Dakota Fred"	March 1, 2024	0.79
92	Special	"In Gold We Trust"	March 8, 2024	N/A
93	1	"A Tragic Beginning"	March 8, 2024	0.93
94	2	"Gold Out of the Gate"	March 8, 2024	0.90
95	3	"Trench Warfare"	March 15, 2024	0.83
96	4	"A Dying Wish"	March 22, 2024	0.80
97	5	"Fred Hurt Forever"	March 29, 2024	0.74
98	6	"Fred's Golden Gift"	April 5, 2024	0.80
99	7	"Unfinished Business"	April 12, 2024	0.73
100	8	"Welcome to My Nightmare"	April 19, 2024	0.82
101	9	"$70,000 Nugget"	April 26, 2024	0.82
102	10	"Dustin's White Whale"	May 3, 2024	0.73
103	11	"Get Rich or Die Trying"	May 10, 2024	0.85
104	12	"Dancing With Death"	May 17, 2024	0.77

=== Season 9 ===
No. overall	No. in season	Title	Original release date	U.S. viewers (millions)
105	Special	"Help From Above"	April 18, 2025	0.33
106	1	"Chasing Waterfalls"	April 25, 2025	0.64
107	2	"Season-Ending Blow"	May 2, 2025	0.58
108	3	"Man Overboard"	May 9, 2025	0.55
109	4	"Fight for Your Life"	May 16, 2025	0.52
110	5	"Love and War"	May 23, 2025	0.57
111	6	"Grave Diggers"	May 30, 2025	0.61
112	7	"The Beginning of the End"	June 6, 2025	0.48
113	8	"Mutiny at Nugget Creek"	June 13, 2025	0.55
114	9	"When Darkness Falls"	June 20, 2025	0.63
115	10	"Winter Waits for No Man"	June 27, 2025	0.48
116	Special	"Golden Road"	July 4, 2025	0.27
117	11	"Broken and Stranded"	July 11, 2025	0.52
118	12	"The Last Stand"	July 18, 2025	0.54
119	Special	"On Death's Door"	July 18, 2025	N/A

== Locations ==
- Haines Borough, Alaska, United States (seasons 1–9)
  - The Trifecta Claim (McKinley Creek, Chilkat Range, Alaska, United States; seasons 1–2; season 4) — owned by Dustin Hurt
  - Cahoon Creek Claim (Chilkat Range; season 2) — owned by Dustin Hurt
  - Two Fish Claim – Thunder Falls (Cahoon Creek, Chilkat Range; season 3) — owned by "Dakota" Fred Hurt
  - Rainbow's End Claim (Cahoon Creek, Chilkat Range; season 3) — owned by Dustin Hurt
  - Rockfall Ravine Claim (The Nugget Bowl - The Chute - The Dog Leg) (McKinley Falls, McKinley Creek, Chilkat Range; seasons 3–5) — owned by Dustin Hurt
  - House Rock Claim (McKinley Creek, Chilkat Range; season 5) — owned by Dustin Hurt
  - Nugget Creek Claims (Upstream - The Wall - The Golden Straits – Golden Gates – Mouth of the Dragon - Big-Ass Boulder - Moby Anomaly – Nugget Bend) (Chilkat Range; seasons 6–9) — owned by Dustin Hurt
  - Upper Porcupine Creek Claim (Porcupine Creek, Chilkat Range; season 6) — owned by Mark Sebens

McKinley Camp
McKinley Creek, Chilkat Range, Alaska, United States (seasons 1–5)
Porcupine Creek Mine Base Camp
Porcupine Creek, Chilkat Range, Alaska, United States (seasons 1–6)
High Camp
Chilkat Range, Alaska, United States (season 3)
Nugget Creek Camp
Tsirku River (Devil's Landing), Chilkat Range, Alaska, United States (seasons 6–9)

- Haines, Alaska, United States (seasons 1–9)
- Valdez, Alaska, United States (season 5)
  - Mineral Creek Claim (Chugach Census Area, Alaska, United States; season 5)
- Fairplay, Colorado, United States (season 1)
- Medford, Oregon, United States (season 4)
- Glendale, Oregon, United States (season 8)

== See also ==
- Gold mining in Alaska
- Yukon Gold, a reality TV series with placer gold mining in the Cassiar and Atlin districts of British Columbia and the Klondike, Yukon.
