= Government Indian School =

- U.S. National Register of Historic Places
- Alaska Heritage Resources Survey
- Location within Alaska
- Location: First Avenue, between Union Street and View Street, Haines, Alaska
- Coordinates: 59°14′16″N 135°26′35″W
- Area: 0.4 acres (0.16 ha)
- Built: 1905
- Built by: U.S. Bureau of Education
- NRHP reference No.: 80000756
- AHRS No.: SKG-075

Significant dates
- Added to NRHP: February 8, 1980
- Designated AHRS: June 20, 1977

The Government Indian School, also known as the B.I.A. School and later the City Multipurpose Building, is a historic school building in Haines, Alaska. The building is a 1 1/2-story wood-frame structure, 71 feet (22 m) long and 30 feet (9.1 m) wide, built in 1906. It is basically a Cape Cod style structure, an unusual form for Southeast Alaska, and an unusual sight when it was built. About 1/3 of its interior provided living quarters for the schoolmaster, and there were two classrooms on the first floor, and an auxiliary finished space in the loft area that saw several uses during the building's use as a school. The building is distinctive as a rare early school building built by the United States Bureau of Indian Affairs, and it was the first 20th century structure built in Haines. It served as a school until 1945, after which it was adapted to other public uses. The building is currently hosting the Chilkat Valley Preschool.

The building was listed on the National Register of Historic Places in 1980.

== See also ==
- National Register of Historic Places listings in Haines Borough, Alaska
