= Moose and Zee =

Animated characters created for the Noggin brand

- First appearance: 7 April 2003
- Last appearance: March 1, 2012 (TV); July 2, 2024 (Noggin app)
- Created by: Teri Weiss
- Voiced by: Paul Christie (US); David Holt (UK) (Moose)

In-universe information
- Species: Moose (Moose); Bird (Zee)
- Gender: Male (Moose); Female (Zee)
- Occupation: Teachers and guides

Moose and Zee are a pair of cartoon characters created as mascots for the Noggin brand. They debuted as the on-air hosts of the Noggin cable channel on April 7, 2003, then moved to Nick Jr. from 2009 to 2012. In 2015, Noggin was relaunched as a mobile streaming service, and Moose and Zee were reintroduced as hosts of the app.

The character of Moose was created to act like a teacher, providing information and education between shows on Noggin. Zee was created as a stand-in for the preschool audience. In addition to television, Moose and Zee have appeared in books, live performances, and a variety of merchandise.

Moose and Zee were featured on the Noggin streaming service until 2024, when the Noggin brand was sold. While they do not appear on the current Noggin app, a 2025 promo featured human characters named after Moose and Zee.

== Description ==
Moose A. Moose (voiced by Paul Christie in the US and David Holt in the UK) is an anthropomorphic yellow moose who teaches lessons to viewers through asking questions.

Zee D. Bird is a small silent blue bird who communicates through blinking, flapping her wings, and staring. She is Moose's best friend and assists viewers in figuring out answers to questions.

== Segments ==
Over 100 animated shorts were produced featuring Moose and Zee. Most of them originally aired with wraparound segments announcing upcoming shows on Noggin's schedule. 46 of these shorts have been released as part of the Noggin subscription service as of November 11, 2015, with the wraparound segments removed.

=== Recurring segments ===
- Art Alive
- Let's Do Math!
- Bedtime Business
- Getting Going
- Mighty Fine Art – Moose and Zee discuss a painting or artist at the art museum.
- Puzzle Time – Moose asks the viewer to solve a puzzle by finding shapes or letters, find words that rhyme or things that start with a letter and its sound, match two images, or spot the difference in a group of pictures.
- Music Video – Moose sings about a season, holiday, or concept.
- Move to the Music – Music videos, commonly from Laurie Berkner or various currently-airing series.
- In Other Words – A specific word is introduced and explained to the viewer.
- Show and Tell
- Critter Corner – An animal is introduced and facts are explained to the viewer.
- Field Trip
- Class Pet Time – The life of an animated, ringtail like animal named "Chip-Chip" is presented. The shorts are narrated by Moose, with children's voices commenting on Chip-Chip's actions.
- Story Time – A well-known story is read aloud, occasionally by Moose himself. He said what happens next, and is responded to by the kids. Originally, the segment was named And Then What Happened?, first airing in 2002, a year before Moose and Zee, when Feetface was hosting. It was renamed a year later.
- Little Green Fingers – A live-action segment featuring a type of plant. These shorts were only aired in the United Kingdom (until being added to the Noggin app under the title "Zee's Garden").
- Zee's Bookshelf – Zee introduces a then-upcoming television program. Ebb and Flo was aired exclusively between these segments.

== History ==
Several weeks before Moose and Zee debuted as Noggin's hosts, advertisements featuring Moose and Zee were broadcast on Noggin to notify viewers of upcoming schedule changes, as well as to introduce the characters to replace their unnamed blue mascot, who was nicknamed "Feetface" by fans. They officially debuted on April 7, 2003, as part of the Noggin channel redesign. Moose and Zee's first day also introduced Tweenies, Miffy and Friends, and the second season of Oobi (the first season of Oobi shorts had aired since 2000). Segments with Moose and Zee continued to appear daily on Noggin throughout their run. After the channel was replaced by the Nick Jr. Channel (based on the preexisting Nick Jr. brand), segments with Moose and Zee were temporarily shown to ease the transition, but all of the characters' branding was removed on March 1, 2012. Moose and Zee were reintroduced as hosts of the Noggin mobile app in March 2015. The original 2015 commercial for the Noggin app features Moose and Zee, marking the first time since 2012 that the characters have been seen on television.

From late 2005 to April 2010, for the TMF UK block of Noggin (also known as Noggin on TMF), Moose was introduced with a UK dubbing in their segments that appeared on the block. The UK voice was done by David Holt, a popular British voice actor which also did Face in the United Kingdom. The UK dub and its segments are hard to come across, so not much footage of the dub has surfaced.

From 2008 until 2012, Moose and Zee were featured in wraparound segments on Noggin's video on demand service.

Several of Moose and Zee's segments were dubbed into Spanish in late 2015, with the dubbed segments included as part of the Latin American Noggin app.

== In other media ==
=== Online ===
Moose and Zee were featured on Noggin.com from 2003 to 2009, and again from 2015 to 2024. Over a hundred tie-in printables and crafts were made. Recipes like character cakes and meals inspired by the shorts were also made. Many online games featured Moose and Zee as characters, including "Doodle Pad", "What's the Word, Bird?", "What's Different", "Little Letter Playground" and "Balloon Math". Video clips of Moose and Zee were included on the "Nick Jr. Video" service until early 2012.

Moose and Zee were also the hosts of two defunct online learning programs. The first was titled "MyNoggin" and was available at www.mynoggin.com in 2007 through 2009. MyNoggin subscriptions were available both online and through prepaid game cards sold in stores. In early 2010, a mobile app featuring the characters called "A to Z with Moose and Zee" was made available in the iOS App Store.

As part of the revival of the Noggin brand as an app in 2015, Moose and Zee were reintroduced to Noggin.com.

=== Live shows ===
In late 2009, Moose and Zee appeared in the stage show "Storytime Live!", produced by Key Brand Entertainment. Moose was played by an actor in a full-size costume, and Zee appeared as a puppet created by Geppetto Studios.

Noggin made a different mascot-style costume of Moose A. Moose for other "meet-and-greet" event appearances. The meet-and-greet costume design was much different from the Storytime Live! version, with the Moose costume being much larger and more similar to his square shape as seen in the shorts.

== Merchandise ==
In November 2005, Noggin released its first-ever merchandise (like clothing, notebooks, holiday ornaments and greeting cards) featuring Moose, Zee, and the Noggin logo. These products were only sold on the Noggin.com online store. In 2010, plush dolls and straw toppers featuring the characters were sold at the Storytime Live! show.

In 2011, a short section called "Learn with Moose and Zee!" was included in many Dora the Explorer books released that year, such as "Dora Loves Boots", "Dora Saves the Enchanted Forest", "Dora and Diego Help the Little Wolf", and a reissue of "At the Carnival". No full-length books were released with the characters.

Moose and Zee are the hosts of a Nintendo-produced game for the Wii console, Nickelodeon Fit.

Moose and Zee were also included as mascots on a few DVDs. These include the 2010 DVD Let's Hear It For the Laurie Berkner Band! (which includes the shorts "Everywhere I Go", "Music Makes Me", "Are We There Yet?", and "Words of Wonder") and the Dora the Explorer DVD Explore the Earth! (which includes the shorts "In My Neighborhood" and "Explore the Seashore"). Some Moose and Zee shorts were available on the iTunes Store. The music video "I Don't Like Candy Corn" is part of the collection Nick Jr. Haunted Halloween, Vol. 3 and the music video "Winter Wonderland" is part of Nick Jr. Wintertime Adventures.
