= Budweiser Frogs =

- Advertisement featuring the Frogs
- Country of origin: United States

Production
- Running time: 15–60 seconds
- Production company: Palomar Pictures

Original release
- Release: 1995 – 2000

The Budweiser Frogs are three lifelike puppet frogs named "Bud", "Weis", and "Er", who began appearing in American television commercials for Budweiser beer during Super Bowl XXIX in 1995. Adweek called it one of the "most iconic alcohol campaigns in advertising history". The first Budweiser Frogs commercial was created by David Swaine, Michael Smith and Mark Choate of DMB&B/St. Louis. The commercial was directed by Gore Verbinski, who would later direct the first three Pirates of the Caribbean films.

== Bud, Weis, and Er ==
The first commercial began with a scene of a swamp at nighttime, and a close-up of Bud rhythmically croaking his name. Later, Weis and Er join in, and they croak rather randomly for about ten seconds, until Bud, Weis, and Er begin croaking in sequence, thus forming the Budweiser name. Their croaking becomes quicker as the camera pulls back to show a bar with a large neon Budweiser sign glowing in the night. The commercial is often listed among the best Super Bowl commercials in history, ranking at No. 5 at MSNBC's list in 2004. Several more Frog ads were produced, with Hollywood Animatronic Effects company The Character Shop brought online to give the frogs more flexibility and capabilities. In one ad, the three Budweiser Frogs are sitting on a log in a Louisiana swamp, basking in the sun, when a Budweiser truck rolls by. Bud zaps out his sticky tongue, latching onto the moving truck. Like an elastic bungee, the tongue stretches to the point where it can no more, then launches Bud off the log, sending him flying through the air after the truck, while a "Yee-Haw!" and Cajun music are heard. The frog puppets featured silicone skins over animatronic armatures, which allowed the frogs to breathe, bloat their throats, speak, and blink and move their eyes, via Radio Control and Rod Operation. A subsequent ad featured not the entire trio, but rather Bud and a newfound female frog. One later Super Bowl commercial featuring the frogs had them riding on the back of an alligator into the bar, where they croak their names at the startled patrons, and leave with a crate of Budweiser beer strapped to the alligator's waist while dancing to Jamming by Bob Marley and the Wailers.

== Louie, Frankie, and the Ferret ==
After the initial ads generated great interest, new creatures began making appearances in the swamp. Beginning at Super Bowl XXXII, a new campaign created by Goodby, Silverstein & Partners introduced two wisecracking chameleons named Louie and Frankie. Louie, notable for his distinct Brooklyn accent (voiced by New York City voice actor Paul Christie), was irritated by the frogs' incessant croaking, and jealous of their success, while Frankie, who speaks in a low baritone voice (voiced by the Broadway veteran Danny Mastrogiorgio), was his more rational, even-tempered friend. Frankie apparently socialized with the frogs and was puzzled by Louie's animosity towards them.

As the series' storyline progressed, it documented Louie enlisting the assistance of an inept ferret hit man, who tries to kill the frogs by dismantling and dropping the Budweiser neon sign into the swamp water, thus electrocuting them. Although this assassination attempt failed, it resulted in Weis developing post-electroshock muscular irregularity. Louie briefly replaced Weis in the “Bud-Weis-Er” chant, but ended up getting all of them fired, due to his inability to just follow the script. The other frogs in return gave him a literal tongue-lashing and revealed to Louie that they could speak with a complete vocabulary and that they knew all along about his plot against them. The three frogs then began a new lifestyle as flashy tap-dancing and Fred Astaire-mimicking acts on Broadway.

The Budweiser Lizards later replaced the frogs entirely and continued appearing in television and radio advertisements into the early 2000s. In March 1999, Budweiser released a CD called Frank & Louie's Greatest Hits, featuring songs such as "Sweet Home Alabama," "My Sharona," and "Rock This Town" woven around alternate takes of some of Frank and Louie's radio ads.

== Controversy ==
Much like the Joe Camel controversy around the time of the frogs' popularity, a 1996 study showed that more children recognized the Budweiser frogs, which they correctly associated with beer, than other mascot characters such as Ronald McDonald, Smokey Bear, and Tony the Tiger; only Bugs Bunny did slightly better. Many have speculated that Budweiser's frogs were targeting younger people to their alcoholic products. Anheuser-Busch denied this, but because of such findings, Budweiser eventually slowed down the ad campaign in the following years, and by 2000, the frogs were replaced by two chameleons named Louie and Frankie, who appealed to an older audience than they did. However, the frogs and chameleons were in some of the same commercials.

== In popular culture ==
- The first episode of MADtv from 1995 did a parody of the Budweiser Frogs' "Truck" commercial, where the brand was parodied as "Vudweiser" and its slogan "King of Beers" was parodied as "Prince of Beers"; thus with the frog "Bud" changed to "Vud". Vud sticks his tongue to the back of a passing beer truck in a manner similar to the Budweiser commercial. Vud then flies through the air attached to the truck, but his "Yee-Haw" startles the driver, who then brakes suddenly. This causes Vud to fatally collide with the truck's back door.
- In 1996, a rap song called "Motivators" by A Tribe Called Quest samples the frogs.
- In the 1997 The Simpsons episode "The Springfield Files", the three frogs say their names, and are then eaten by an alligator who growls "Coors".
- In the 1997 direct-to-video film Casper: A Spirited Beginning, the Ghostly Trio parodied the frogs by taking on a green appearance and saying "Bull... doz... er" before possessing a bulldozer.
- An incorrect computer virus report exists, in which downloading a screensaver of the Frogs destroys your computer. While it is claimed this is a virus hoax it is based on the misunderstanding. If the computer was defragmenting the harddrive at the same time, the screensaver interfered with the writing or verification of the data, resulting in overwritten and destroyed data. The assumption was a virus, which is not correct; it was the result of a poorly written program.
- A 2001 rap song called "Terrorwrist (Beneath the Under)" by Mix Master Mike samples the frogs.
- A 2011 episode of SportsNation on ESPN2 briefly parodied this commercial, where one of the three was sportscaster Michelle Beadle in a frog suit.
- A bumper for the SiriusXM satellite radio station '90s on 9 parodies this ad.
- An episode of Robot Chicken from the seventh season titled "Link's Sausages" contains a sketch featuring the Budweiser Frogs, where one of them laments that he has a drinking problem and has cirrhosis of the liver as a result.
- In a promo for season 3 of The Masked Singer, panelists Jenny McCarthy, Ken Jeong, Robin Thicke, and Nicole Scherzinger controlled lifelike frog puppets similar to those seen in the Budweiser commercials, although this version has the frogs say "The" "Masked" "Sing" "Er".
- In "Golden Globes Party" (Season 3, Episode 9) of Superstore, Dina mentions a set of three decorative singing frogs that make sounds together, leading to the memorable line: "So it took all three frogs to say 'Budweiser'?"

== See also ==
- Budweiser
- Budweiser Clydesdales
- Spuds MacKenzie
