= Charlie Anway Cabin =

Historic house in Alaska, United States

- U.S. National Register of Historic Places
- Alaska Heritage Resources Survey
- Location within Alaska
- Location: Mile 1.5 of Haines Highway, Haines, Alaska
- Coordinates: 59°14′27″N 135°28′45″W
- Area: less than one acre
- Built: 1903
- Built by: Charles H. Anway
- NRHP reference No.: 01000967
- AHRS No.: SKG-00184
- Added to NRHP: September 14, 2001

The Charlie Anway Cabin is a historic log cabin near Haines, Alaska, United States. It was built out of hewn logs in 1903 by Charles H. Anway, the first homesteader to settle in the Haines area. When first built, the cabin was L-shaped with a cross-gable roof with wood shingles. Anway later extended the building, giving it a T shape, and added a layer of metal from flattened cans; the roof has since been covered in galvanized corrugated sheet metal. Anway settled here and eventually produced crops which he sold at Fort William H. Seward. He farmed until 1932, and died in 1949. The cabin and two outbuildings are now owned by the Chilkoot Valley Historical Society.

The cabin was listed on the National Register of Historic Places in 2001.

== See also ==
- National Register of Historic Places listings in Haines Borough, Alaska
