= Porcupine, Alaska =

- Porcupine District
- U.S. National Register of Historic Places
- U.S. Historic district
- Alaska Heritage Resources Survey
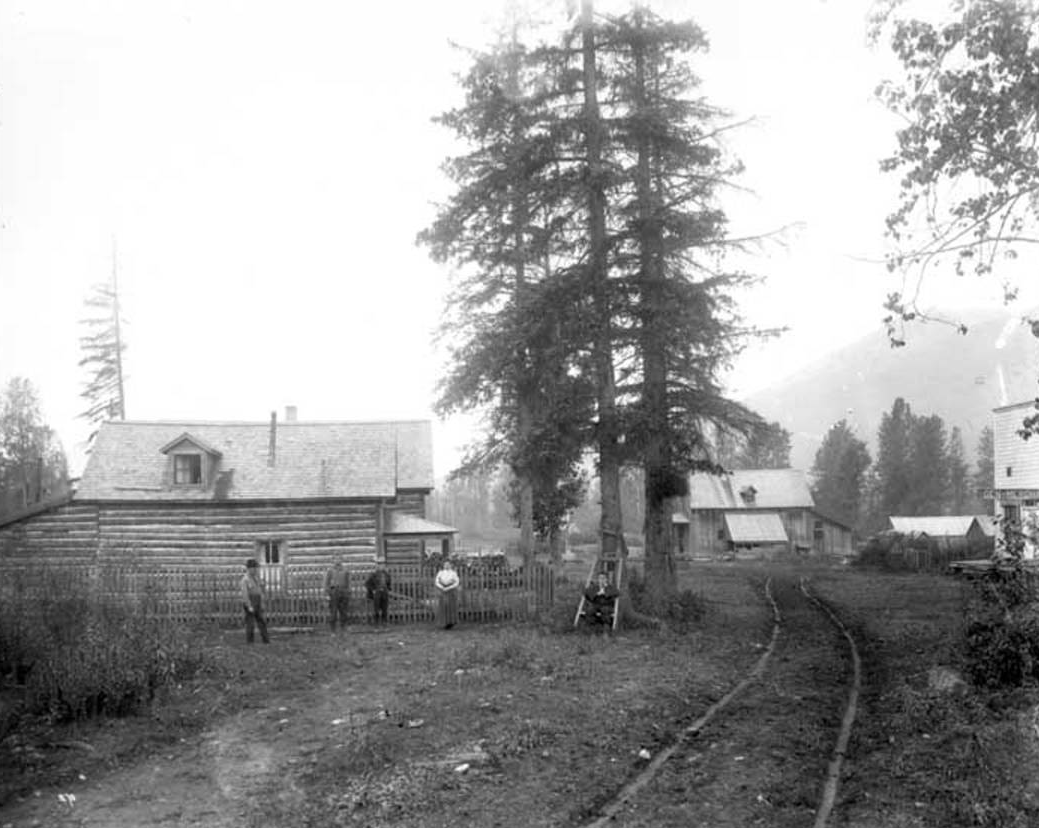
- A 1910 view of Porcupine

- Location within Alaska

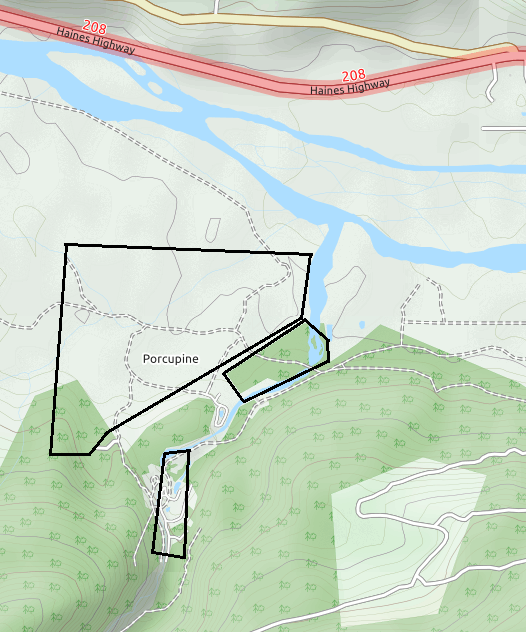
- Boundaries of Porcupine District
- Location: 1 mile (1.6 km) southwest of Mile 35 of Haines Highway, across Klehini River
- Nearest city: Haines, Alaska
- Coordinates: 59°25′20″N 136°14′14″W
- Area: 40 acres (16 ha)
- NRHP reference No.: 76000358
- AHRS No.: SKG-015

Significant dates
- Added to NRHP: November 13, 1976
- Designated AHRS: September 1972

Porcupine is a ghost town and former mining community in Haines Borough, Alaska. It is located about 1 mile (1.6 km) southwest of Mile 35 of the Haines Highway, across the Klehini River. Gold was discovered along Porcupine Creek in 1898, and a seasonal community sprang up in the area. Due to the transient nature of the population, permanent structures were only gradually added to the area. At the time the Porcupine District was listed on the National Register of Historic Places in 1976, about 25 structures were still standing in the area, in various stages of decay. Most of these were built during the period 1927–36, when the Sunshine Mining Company was the largest operator in the area.

== See also ==
- National Register of Historic Places listings in Haines Borough, Alaska
