= Pleasant Camp (Haines, Alaska) =

- Pleasant Camp / Dalton Trail Camp
- U.S. National Register of Historic Places
- Alaska Heritage Resources Survey
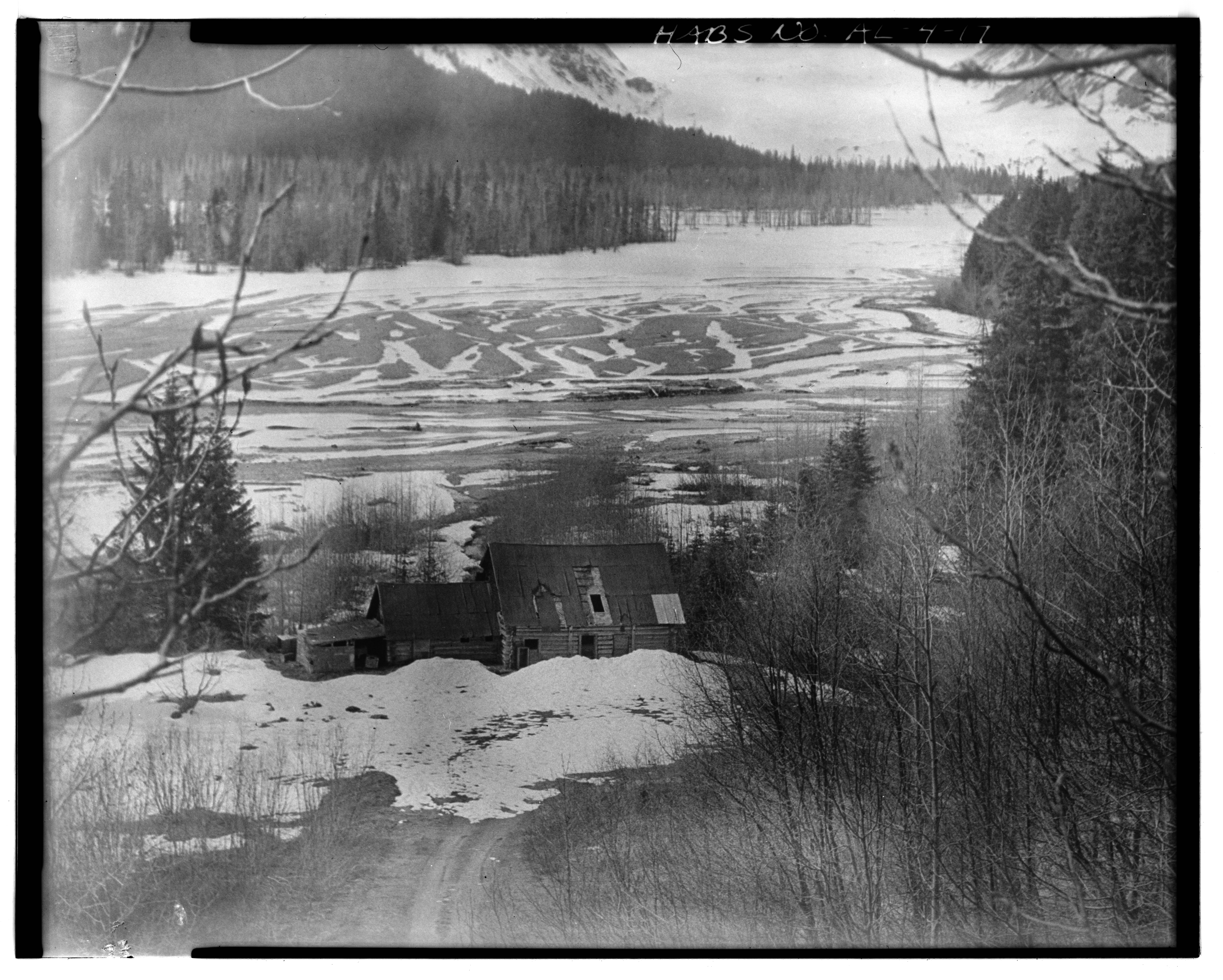
- HABS photo, c. 1979

- Location within Alaska
- Location: Mile 40 of Haines Highway
- Nearest city: Haines, Alaska
- Coordinates: 59°27′0″N 136°21′46″W
- Area: 0.5 acres (0.20 ha)
- NRHP reference No.: 73000376
- AHRS No.: SKG-002

Significant dates
- Added to NRHP: July 5, 1973
- Designated AHRS: 1971

Pleasant Camp, also known as the Dalton Trail Camp, is a historic frontier police outpost near Haines, Alaska. It was established by the Canadian North-West Mounted Police in 1898 as a border station between the United States and Canada where they could control the flow of miners during the Klondike Gold Rush. It is located at Mile 40 of the Haines Highway. The post was operated by the NWP until roughly 1899. The border between the two countries was formalized in the area in 1900, resulting in the presence of this former Canadian outpost on US soil.

The camp's surviving remnants were listed on the National Register of Historic Places in 1973.

== See also ==
- National Register of Historic Places listings in Haines Borough, Alaska
