= Carol E. Anway =

American physicist

Carol Elizabeth Anway (also published as Carol Anway-Wiese; born 1965) is a retired American physicist known for her work on computational industrial physics for Boeing, and particularly on lightning protection for airplanes.

== Education and career ==
Anway grew up in Superior, Wisconsin, and studied physics and mathematics at Hamline University in Minnesota. She completed a Ph.D. in physics at the University of California, Los Angeles in 1995. Her dissertation, Search for Rare Decays of the B Meson at 1.8-TeV $p\bar p$ Collisions at CDF, concerned particle physics experiments on the Collider Detector at Fermilab, where she was part of a team that discovered the top quark. Her research was supervised by Thomas Müller, who later became a professor at the Karlsruhe Institute of Technology.

After completing her Ph.D. she worked for Boeing, on military aircraft and on lightning protection for commercial aircraft. She retired from Boeing in 2020.

== Recognition ==
Anway was named as a Fellow of the American Physical Society (APS) in 2018, after a nomination from the APS Forum on Industrial & Applied Physics, "for revolutionary advances in the areas of computational industrial physics, specifically in advanced simulation tools enabling modeling and predictive behavior of sensor and communication architectures in highly complex systems".
