= Reclaimed (TV series) =

2020 American reality television series

- Country of origin: United States

Original release
- Network: Discovery Channel
- Release: January 9 – October 27, 2020

Reclaimed is a mining reality television series that premiered on the Discovery Channel on January 9, 2020. The show focuses on rescuing mines that the claim owners are having trouble exploiting. Other than mining, other ways to exploit land claims are also explored, such as wilderness excursion camping, cottages, hunting; bush agriculture, and building mining camps, accesses, and facilities. The series was hosted by Alex Charvat and Kevin Gilman. For filming, the series received a tax credit from the Colorado Office of Economic Development.

== See also ==
- 2020 in American television
