= Fort William H. Seward =

- U.S. National Register of Historic Places
- U.S. National Historic Landmark District
- Alaska Heritage Resources Survey
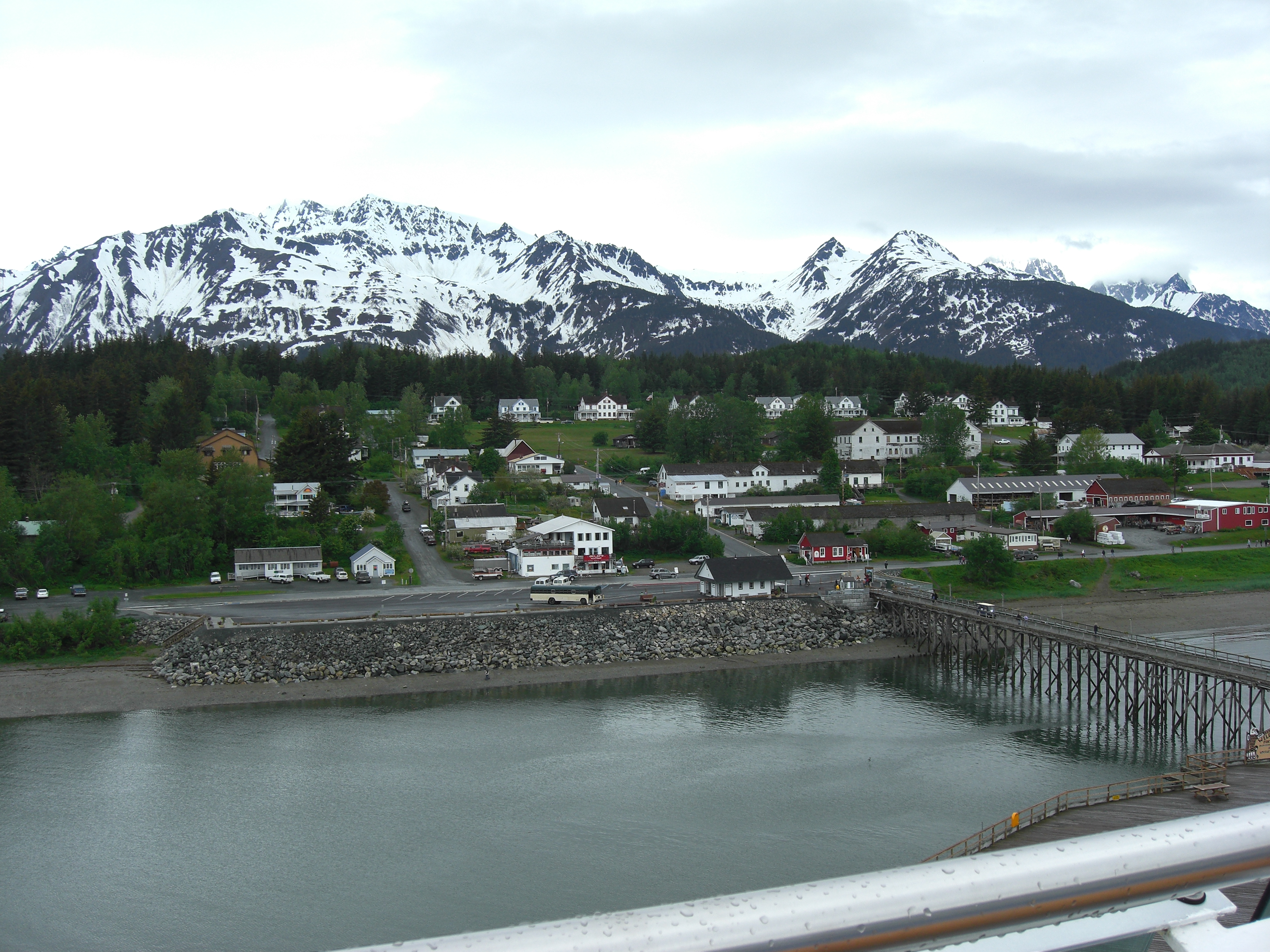
- View of Fort William H. Seward from Chilkoot Inlet, including the beach below and mountains in the background.

- Location within Alaska
- Location: Port Chilkoot, Haines, Alaska
- Coordinates: 59°13′37″N 135°26′38″W
- Built: 1902
- NRHP reference No.: 72000190
- AHRS No.: SKG-001

Significant dates
- Added to NRHP: April 11, 1972
- Designated NHLD: June 2, 1978
- Designated AHRS: 1970

Fort William H. Seward, also known as Chilkoot Barracks and Haines Mission, is a site at Port Chilkoot in Haines Borough, Alaska, about 0.5 miles (0.80 km) from the city of Haines. It was the last of a series of 11 military posts established in Alaska during the gold rush era, and was Alaska's only military facility between 1925 and 1940. It provided a policing presence for miners moving into the gold mining areas in the Alaskan interior, and a military presence during negotiations over the nearby international border with Canada. The fort is named for William H. Seward, the United States Secretary of State who oversaw the Alaska Purchase.

== History ==
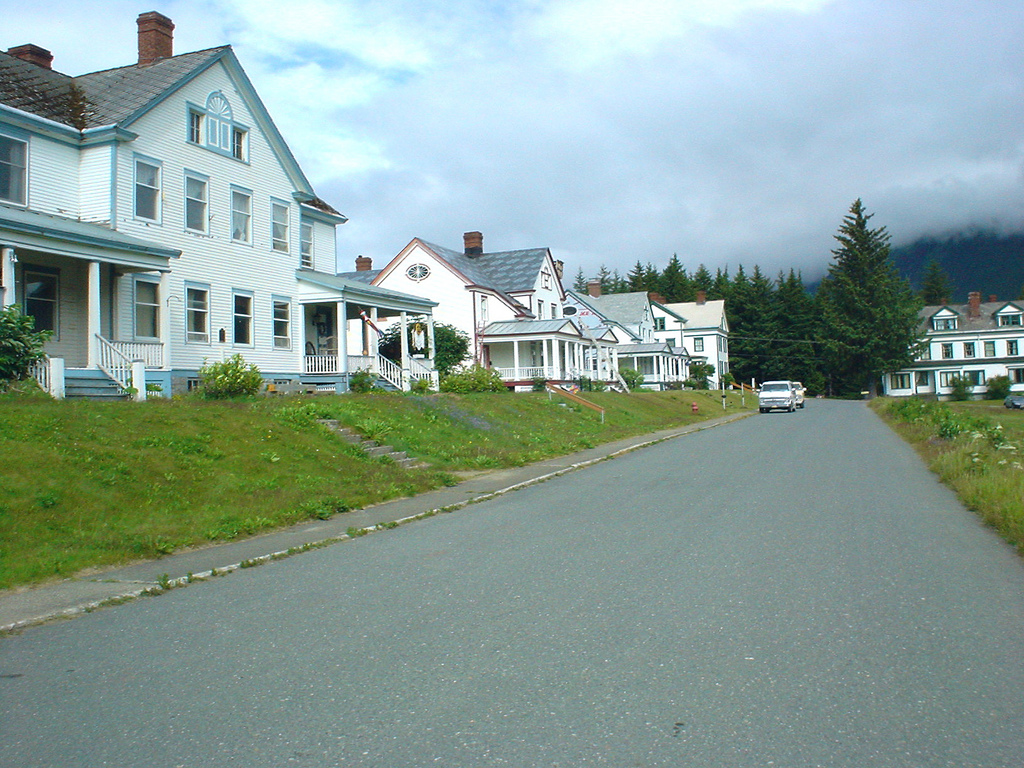
Street-level view of the fort.

The fort was formally authorized by an executive order of President William McKinley in December 1898. United States Army troops had been stationed unofficially in the area during that year. Between 1902 and 1904, a formal infantry outpost consisting of 85 wood-frame buildings was constructed under the supervision of Colonel W. P. Richardson, and was formally named in 1904. It was first occupied by three companies of the Third Infantry, previously stationed at Camp Skagway. By 1909 the fort had grown to cover more than 4,000 acres (1,600 ha). It was formally renamed Chilkoot Barracks in 1922, honoring the local Chilkoot people and the Chilkoot Trail used during the gold rush.

Between 1921 and 1925 all other military installations in Alaska were shut down; in 1927 Fort Seward was manned by a force of 255. The fort was formally deactivated in 1945, and sold to the Port Chilkoot Company. The property has been developed as an art colony; it includes housing and art galleries, and accommodations for tourists.

The fort was listed on the National Register of Historic Places in 1972, and was declared a National Historic Landmark in 1978.

== Demographics ==
Historical population
Census	Pop.	Note	%±
1910	255		—
1920	186		−27.1%
1930	234		25.8%
1940	337		44.0%
U.S. Decennial Census

Fort William H. Seward first appeared separately on the 1910 U.S. Census and in 1920. Its name was changed to Chilkoot Barracks in 1930 and 1940, before its closure in 1945. It has since been annexed into the City of Haines.

== See also ==
- List of National Historic Landmarks in Alaska
- National Register of Historic Places listings in Haines Borough, Alaska
