= Paul Christie (voice actor) =

American voice actor (born 1951)

- Born: January 3, 1951 (age 75); New York, New York, U.S.
- Other name: Paul Christy
- Occupations: Voice actor, artist, writer, narrator, comedian
- Years active: 1982–present
- Agent: CESD Talent
- Known for: Stick Stickly; Moose A. Moose; Louie the Lizard

Paul Anthony Christie (born January 3, 1951) is an American voice actor. He was born and raised in New York City and has worked as an artist, writer, actor, songwriter, narrator, comedian, and voice actor. He has since contributed his voice to hundreds of radio and television commercials for clients including Chrysler, Domino's, Pontiac, Canon, Calvin Klein, and Budweiser. Some of his notable commercial roles include Louie the Lizard for Budweiser and Vinnie the Panda for Fox's Biscuits. Aside from commercials, Christie has also done voiceover work for television, film and video games for over three decades.

== Career ==
In the 1970s, Christie was a contributing editor for Crawdaddy magazine. In the 1980s, he performed stand-up comedy in and around New York and co-founded the improvisational group The House Band. His graphic artwork was well known in New York through Kid Christie, the company he co-founded with Theresa Fiorentino. As a writer, Christie co-wrote the Meat Loaf albums Midnight at the Lost and Found, and Blind Before I Stop.

In the 1990s, he started working as a professional voiceover artist, voicing Stick Stickly for Nick's "Nick in the Afternoon", created by Agi Fodor and Karen Kuflik. In 2003, he began voicing Moose A. Moose, one of the on-air hosts of the Noggin cable channel. Christie continued to voice Moose after the Noggin brand was revived as a mobile app in 2015. Christie was also the president of the New York chapter of the Screen Actors Guild from 2003 to 2007. He was elected 2nd national vice president of the guild in 2006 and served on the board of directors from 2000 to 2009.

== Filmography ==
=== Television ===
- 1992 - Square One TV - Zook (3 episodes)
- 1995–1998 - Nick in the Afternoon - Stick Stickly/Mama Stickly/Wood Knot (voice)
- 2004–2005 - Stroker & Hoop - C.A.R.R. (voice, 13 episodes)
- 2004–2015 - Nature - Narrator
- 2005 - Saturday Night Live (2 episodes)
- 2008 - Click and Clack's As the Wrench Turns - Antique Roadkill host/Jerry the first caller (voice, 4 episodes)
- 2010–2016 - Dual Survival - Narrator (84 episodes)
- 2010–present - Gold Rush - Narrator
- 2018–2019 - Our Cartoon President - Jim Mattis (voice) (10 episodes)
- 2020–2025 - Gold Rush: White Water - Narrator

=== Film ===
- 1982 - Girls Nite Out - Dancer
- 1996 - The Weinerville Election Special: From Washington, D.C. - Stick Stickly (voice)
- 2001 - Osmosis Jones - Dan Matter and Germ (voice)
- 2003 - Brother Bear - Ram #1 (voice)

=== Video games ===
- 1996 - Nickelodeon 3D Movie Maker - Stick Stickly
- 2003 - Max Payne 2: The Fall of Max Payne - Godfather
- 2003 - Brother Bear - Ram #2
- 2004 - Def Jam: Fight for NY - Jervis
- 2006 - Def Jam Fight for NY: The Takeover - Jervis
- 2010 - Alan Wake - Paul Randolph, Rudolf Lane
- 2010 - Nickelodeon Fit - Moose A. Moose
- 2011 - Homefront - Additional Voices

=== Other ===
- 1997–2000 - Budweiser Lizards - Louie the Lizard (voice)
- 2003–2012 - Moose and Zee - Moose A. Moose (voice)
- 2011–2015 - The '90s Are All That - Stick Stickly (voice)
