= Klehini River =

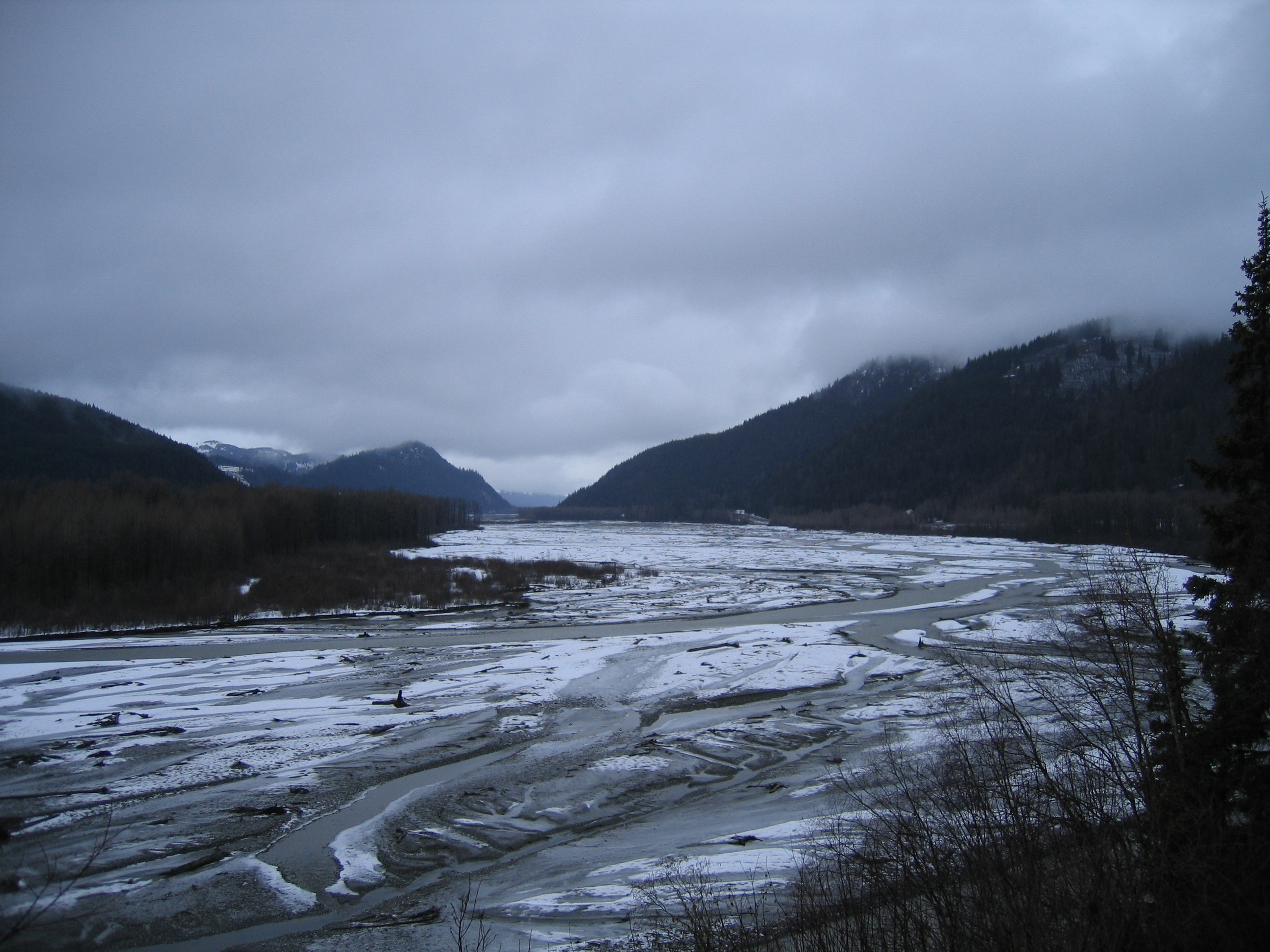
- Near mile 27 of the Haines Highway

- Location of the mouth of the Klehini River in Alaska

Location
- Country: Canada, United States

Physical characteristics
- Source: unnamed glacier
  - location: Nadahini Mountain, British Columbia
- Mouth: Chilkat River
  - location: opposite Klukwan, 22 miles (35 km) west of Skagway, Saint Elias Mountains, Alaska
  - coordinates: 59°24′42″N 135°55′48″W
  - elevation: 112 ft (34 m)
- Length: 42 mi (68 km)

The Klehini River is a large, glacially fed stream in the vicinity of Haines in the U.S. state of Alaska.

The Klehini River is about 42 miles (68 km) long from its source in British Columbia to its mouth at the Chilkat River, of which it is the largest tributary. The Klehini River is renowned for its salmon runs, its biannual congregation of bald eagles—the second largest in the Haines area after the Chilkat River's Council Grounds—and for the Klehini Falls. The Klehini also delineates the northern boundary of the Chilkat Range.

The name Klehini appears to be derived from the Tlingit phrase l’éiw héeni, which translates to river with sand or gravel in it. The Klehini River contains abundances of both sand and gravel.

The lower Klehini is located within the Alaska Chilkat Bald Eagle Preserve.

Walt Disney's 1991 rendition of White Fang was filmed along the Klehini River.

== Klehini Falls ==
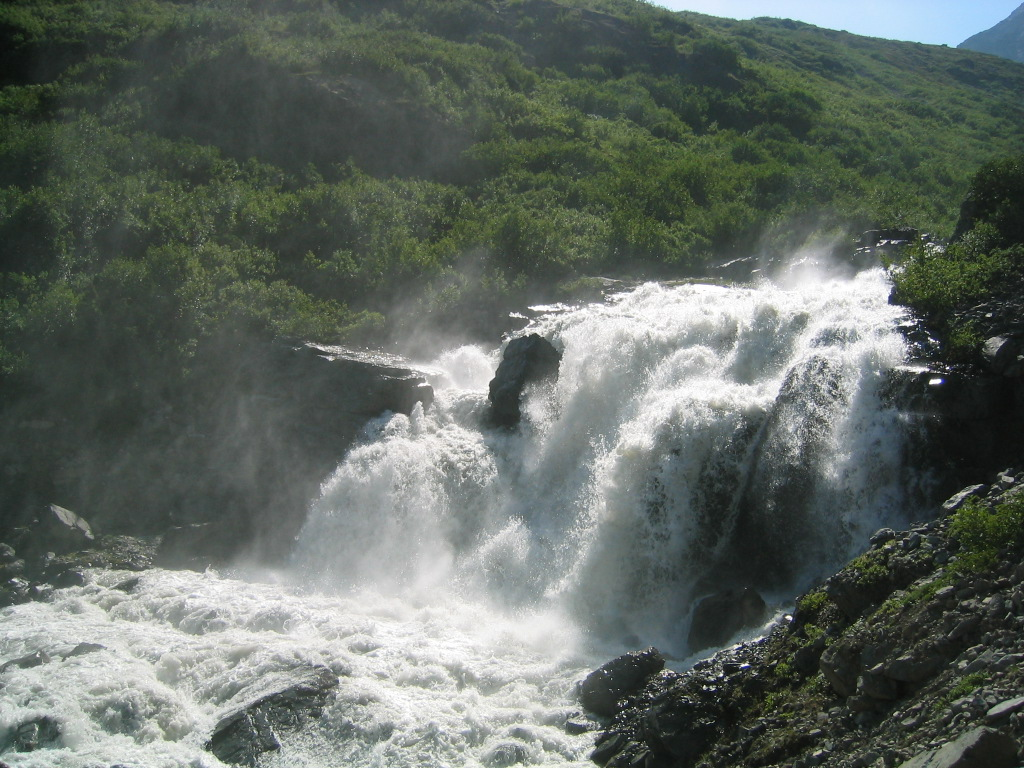
Uppermost cataract of Klehini Falls

The Klehini Falls are a series of four cataracts in far northwestern British Columbia occurring in a narrow gorge near the headwaters of the Klehini River. The falls are separated from one another by a distance of approximately 300 feet (91 m), with an average plunge of 30 to 40 feet (9.1 to 12.2 m). The individual cataracts are currently unnamed.

== Threats ==
The Klehini and Chilkat Rivers were listed among America's Most Endangered Rivers in 2023 due to threats from the Palmer Project, a proposed underground copper and zinc mine sited upstream from the Tlingit village of Klukwan. If built, the project is feared to result in pollution from acidic wastewater laced with heavy metals and hydrocarbons.

== See also ==
- List of rivers of Alaska
- List of rivers of British Columbia
