= Raw TV =

British film & television production company

- Type: Subsidiary
- Industry: Television
- Founded: 2001; 25 years ago
- Founder: Dimitri Doganis
- Headquarters: London, United Kingdom
- Key people: Dimitri Doganis (chief creative officer); Joely Fether (chief executive officer); Fiona Clarke (chief operating officer)
- Parent: Discovery Communications (2014–2017); All3Media (2017–2026); Banijay UK (2026–present)
- Website: www.raw.co.uk

Raw TV is a British film & television production company based in London producing documentaries and scripted television shows & films, including Gold Rush, Banged Up Abroad, Shackleton: Death or Glory, Three Identical Strangers, Stanley Tucci: Searching for Italy and The Tinder Swindler. The company was founded in 2001 by Dimitri Doganis, with a "small development deal" from Channel 4. The company was acquired by Discovery Communications in 2014, and then by All3Media in 2017, and then by Banijay UK in 2026.
