= Jungle Gold =

- Genre: Reality
- Starring: George Wright; Scott Lomu; Stephen Slider
- Country of origin: United States
- Original language: English
- No. of seasons: 2
- No. of episodes: 14

Production
- Executive producers: Charlie Clay; Christo Doyle; Jos Cushing; Sam Maynard
- Running time: 41 to 44 minutes
- Production company: Raw Television

Original release
- Network: Discovery Channel
- Release: October 26, 2012 – September 6, 2013

Jungle Gold is an American reality television series on that originally aired on Discovery Channel from October 26, 2012 to September 6, 2013. It ran for two seasons.

== Synopsis ==
The series follows Scott Lomu and George Wright as they join the lucrative African gold rush in an attempted high-risk financial recovery from having lost everything in the 2008 financial crisis. It focuses on the duo as they encounter the task of gold placer mining in the Ashanti Belt along the Birim River in Ghana of West Africa. The men used excavators, trommels and water pumps to mine for gold. In the first season, the nearest town to their claim is Romaso, in the Ashanti Region. In the second season, the nearest town is Fahiakobo, both close to each other, with the nearest city being Dunkwa-On-Offin. Filming for the second season started on March 6, 2013, with the season premiering on August 11, 2013.

The second season of filming in Ghana was cut short, following an attack on a site nearby by armed militia. The attack resulted in the severe injury of mining partner Allen Reece, and prompted the crew to evacuate the region in fear of their own safety. After relocating to the TV production headquarters in Domenase, Scott and George learned that the Ghanaian Minister for Lands and Natural Resources (Inusah Fuseini) had issued an arrest warrant for them, along with the entire Discovery Channel film crew, in reaction to their exploits shown in the first season (which had just aired in Ghana), because it depicted what many Ghanaian nationals considered illegal mining activity. Scott and George maintain that they have always operated in compliance with Ghanaian law but fled from Ghana with the assistance of the Discovery Channel production crew, rather than risk up to 5 years in a Ghanaian prison awaiting trial. The evacuation and drama surrounding it was shown in the final episode of season 2. Following the incident, Scott and George elected to sell all of their machinery, and focus on other business ventures.

== Episodes ==
=== Series overview ===
Season	Episodes	Originally released	
Season	Episodes	First released	Last released
1	8	October 26, 2012	December 7, 2012
2	6	August 11, 2013	September 6, 2013

=== Season 1 (2012) ===
No. overall	No. in season	Title	Original release date	US viewers (millions)
1	1	"Culture Shock"	October 26, 2012	2.75
Scott Lomu and George Wright land at a rural airport in Kumasi, Ghana. The two are former American real estate investors who lost everything in the 2008 market collapse, and are now over $1,000,000 in debt. They have hatched a radical plan to turn things around; mining for gold. With prices at an all-time high, Ghana has become a hotzone for mining activity. The partners have fundraised $150,000 through a group of American investors to get their operation going. Upon arrival at the property they secured months prior though, they find a large encampment of illegal Chinese gold miners, who have pillaged the ground and have posted armed guards on the borders. The land owner & village council are unwilling to force the illegal operators to leave due to the security risk, forcing Scott and George to team up with fellow American Chris Chandler and his Indian business partner Harkirt Singh. It's not a favorable deal, but with pressure mounting, Scott and George reluctantly agree. The next morning, Scott goes with Chris and Harkirt to the new site, near the village of "Romaso" to mark the property lines. Meanwhile, George is tasked with transporting one of their excavators to the site. Scott and company are stopped in their tracks by neighboring Chinese miners who shoot at them for accidentally venturing off their boundaries, but eventually mark the borders of the Romaso site. Meanwhile, George is struggling to move the beat-up excavator 25 miles to the new property, facing washed out roads, stuck logging trucks and illegal roadblocks, but eventually succeeds with the help of local foreman Victor Kpah. At the edge of Romaso, Scott and George rendezvous and "walk" the excavator the final 3 miles to the property, through a flooded swamp. Despite nearly losing the excavator to neck-deep waters, they successfully get it to high ground at the mine. Their success is bittersweet though, as overnight rains flood the surrounding land further and prevent them from accessing the site. With no way to start mining immediately, the guys decide to flip gold in the local village to make quick cash and keep their families supported. The sketchy gold deal goes well, and the two make nearly $1,000 in profit for an afternoon's work.
2	2	"Hell and High Water"	November 2, 2012	2.76
3	3	"Shots Fired"	November 9, 2012	2.46
4	4	"Broken Man"	November 16, 2012	2.69
5	5	"Desperate Measures"	November 23, 2012	2.79
6	6	"Mad Scramble"	November 30, 2012	2.64
7	7	"Armed Robbery"	December 7, 2012	2.74
8	8	"Behind The Scenes Special"	December 14, 2012	1.55

=== Season 2 (2013) ===
No. overall	No. in season	Title	Original release date	US viewers (millions)
9	1	"Deal with the Devil"	August 11, 2013	1.40
Months after their second failed attempt mining for gold in Ghana, Scott and George are still at rock bottom. Scott convinces his father in law to front $85,000 to give them one more shot, and the guys leave for Ghana once again. This time, they strike a deal with David Thomas, and agree on a 70/30 partnership mining a claim called "Fahaikobo". The deal depends on David providing the legal, licensed mining site, while Scott and George provide their two excavators, and a trommel wash plant. The guys visit a neighboring Chinese mining site that David's partner Alan Reece owns the rights to, and learn that the miners are making $25,000 a day with a primitive operation. David believes they can easily double the results. The guys have one week to prove this to David, who wants to see a 1 gram per ton average in order to move forward. To test the land, David tells the men to bring in their excavators- problem is, their old business partners Chris Chandler and Harcat Singh still have them, and won't give them back. Scott and George locate the machines, and hire a pair of lowboys to transport them- their plan, to forcefully repossess the excavators. George is nearly killed when a lowboy's wheel falls off at high speed, and them guys have to move on with only one truck. At their old partner's site, the guys face off the mining crew using their machines, and eventually negotiate for one of them back. Halfway through the drive back to Fahaikobo, the lowboy breaks down. The next morning, the guys use a new lowboy to move the machine the final few miles to the claim, and at nightfall, park it on the site.
10	2	"Family Emergency"	August 18, 2013	0.96
With just two days left to prove their new claim has gold to mining partner David Thomas, Scott & George switch into high-gear to get results. They are forced to summon the local village to help them prospect however, because their repossessed excavator has broken down. The guys manage to summon a massive group of villagers arrive to help find gold, and accomplish digging over 50 test-pits. While most have no gold in them, Scott & George discover two which have high concentrations, with an estimated 4 grams per ton. David is pleased, but not convinced. He gives them more time to drill the site. Just as the pair prepares to bring in a drill rig, however, Scott discovers his son Kai has autism, and is forced to return home to sort out matters. With Scott gone, George pushes the fixed excavator to stay ahead of the drill rig, clearing a path as fast as he can. George is injured that night, after the excavator knocks a tree onto him, forcing the operation to grind to a halt. The following evening, Dave and the drilling crew crunch numbers to determine how much gold is on the claim. They discover 12,600 tons of gravel lies in a 500-yard hot streak on the property, containing between 1-4 grams per ton, which could yield $2.5 Million dollars. George signs a deal with David to mine the claim.
11	3	"Run & Gun"	August 25, 2013	0.85
While Scott deals with whether to return to Ghana or not, George must continue to run things on his own. After meeting with Dave, George heads to the village of Bremin, where he finds his old trommel he used two years before. He plans to use it on the Fahiakobo site, but when he discovers it's been destroyed by looters, he is forced to confront Dave. Mining partner Allen Reece shows George an alternative to a trommel, which he calls a "Chinese Wash Plant". A Chinese plant has no moving parts, and processes just 40 tons of gravel per hour, but costs only $9,000 to build. George is out of cash though, and has to come up with a way to pay for the new machine. Back in Utah, Scott recruits Steven Slider, an old friend of his who runs excavators, to join the crew in Ghana. After meeting George at Fahiakabo though, he discovers the excavator to be barely operational, and questions the guys' strategies. However, Slider quickly proves himself in helping George with a shady gold deal, which yields them just enough money for the new Chinese Wash Plant.
12	4	"Bailed Out"	September 1, 2013	1.26
George purchases the parts to build the new wash plant, but struggles to assemble the machine with the tools he has. Allen arrives with a special steel saw though, and work begins. As he builds the plant, Scott and George reunite, and along with Slider, plot where to set up their new plant. However, Allen and their hired excavator driver destroy the plant as they attempt to move it, due to the faulty excavator moving it the wrong way. With failure eminent, David Thomas gives up on Scott and George, and takes matters into his own hands. He visits Alpesh, a gold miner who builds high-tech gold trommels, capable of processing over 200 Tons per hour, five times what the chinese plants can. He strikes a deal with Alpesh, and moves the new trommel to the Fahiakobo claim. On the way however, Slider has to make a bush fix to the drive shaft on the machine, and nearly crashes the trommel as they move it onto the claim. Dave reveals it cost him $10,000 to lease the machine, and puts pressure on the guys to begin producing gold. Right as the guys begin to clear land for their first pit, the excavator's track breaks off, and Dave threatens to kill the deal.
13	5	"Wild Ride"	September 6, 2013	0.74
14	6	"Run for the Border"	September 6, 2013	1.23
After buying a chain in town to fix the damaged excavator, George drives back to the mining site. On the way, his convoy is stopped by armed militia, and they are forced to bribe their way through. The militia are in the area close to Fahiakobo arresting illegal miners for their activities. Fahiakobo is legal operation, but only because they haven't mined yet- they do not have their mining license to do so, yet. Back at the claim, Steve, George and Scott successfully re-attach the track on the excavator. Scott and George meet with David, who tells them that they are at least a month away from being able to mine legally. With only 3 weeks of operational capital remaining, Scott and George travel down to Accra, to speed up the licensing process any way they can. Meanwhile, Steve works on the claim with the excavator, clearing land as much as he can legally, to prepare for mining. However, the excavator suffers a complete engine failure, and a frustrated Steve gives up. In the capital, Scott and George manage speed up the licensing process, and are told they are just two weeks from mining. As they leave the minerals commission office, Steve calls and reveals the excavator is dead, and that he is ready to quit. Scott and George call their investor Bud and manage to get a new investment for new machinery. After striking a deal on game-changing equipment, Scott and George meet with Steve, who agrees to return to the site. Back at the claim, the guys are preparing to take delivery of the equipment, when the TV show's head of security shouts for them. He's heard word of a violent attack on a site down the road. Fearing they could also be attacked, the entire production and mine crew flees the claim, and makes it back to the operations compound across the river. There, they learn Alan Reece, one of the Fahiakobo project partners, was brutally injured in the attack. David leaves to go find Alan, and later moves the heavy machinery out of Fahiakobo to safety. A phone call from Alan reveals that someone in the village told an armed militia to attack the site, and they took over $500,000 in gold and money was also stolen. Alan himself was beaten and stabbed in the attack. Scott and George search the local news for information on what happened, and are shocked to find their faces plastered across the headlines. The Minister for Lands and Natural Resources placed out a warrant for the men's arrest. The guys realize they are in deep trouble, and a phone call to the U.S. Embassy confirms that they need to get out of the country. With no way to obtain visas to cross borders, the guys have to somehow sneak out via the international airport in the capital. With an active warrant naming Scott and George as wanted men, they decide to evacuate to the city with help from a helicopter, which takes off from a nearby village field. The remaining film crew, believing they are safe, drives into the city on an 8-hour long route. Halfway through the journey, the film crew gets word that they too are wanted. Somehow, both evacuation teams make it to Accra by nightfall, and take refuge in a Western hotel near the airport. Ironically, the guys are horrified to learn that the man who called for their arrest is actually attending a conference in the same hotel. However, after an uneventful night of sleep, the guys hit the road to reach the airport. Once they arrive, they make it through check-in, sneak through immigration and customs, and finally board an emergency evacuation flight home. As the plane enters international airspace, the team celebrates, and George and Scott vow to clear their names, and go back to Ghana.

== Syndication ==
The series has been syndicated on the following networks and titles:

- Discovery Channel Canada: Jungle Gold
- (United Kingdom) Discovery Channel UK: Jungle Gold
- Discovery Channel Poland: Dżungla złota
- Discovery Channel Netherlands: Jungle Gold
- Discovery Channel Denmark: Jungle Gold
- Discovery Channel Sweden: Jungle Gold
- Discovery Channel Norway: Jungle Gold
- (Hungary) Discovery Channel Magyarország: A dzsungel aranya
- (Germany) (Austria) DMAX: Goldjäger in Afrika
- (New Zealand) Discovery Channel Australia: Jungle Gold
- Discovery Channel India: Jungle Gold
- Russia (Discovery (телеканал)): Золото джунглей

== See also ==
- Mining industry of Ghana
