= Ride with Funkmaster Flex =

US television program

- Starring: Funkmaster Flex, Various Celebrities
- Theme music composer: Funkmaster Flex
- Ending theme: Various
- Country of origin: United States
- Original language: English
- No. of seasons: 2

Production
- Production company: RedMoxie Productions (Monica Taylor EP)

Original release
- Network: Spike TV
- Release: August 16, 2003 – July 24, 2004

Related
- Fast Machines with Funkmaster Flex; Funk Flex Full Throttle

Ride with Funkmaster Flex (Sometimes referred to as FMF) is a television show that was produced by MTV Networks. The show aired from August 16, 2003 – July 24, 2004, lasting two seasons. It was originally shown on Spike TV and RedMoxie and was also broadcast on MuchMusic and ESPN with a licensing agreement to MTV Networks.

== Format ==
The show was owned and executive produced by Lashan Browning and Monica Taylor, hosted by hip-hop DJ and car enthusiast Funkmaster Flex. The program documents the subculture of automobiles that are popular in the hip-hop and Hollywood communities. In each episode, host Funkmaster Flex shows viewers automobiles owned by well-known celebrities, and goes on test-drives with them.

== Celebrities ==
Ride with Funkmaster Flex follows a similar format as Cribs, but with cars. Celebrities featured include Eminem, Donovan McNabb, Queen Latifah, 50 Cent, Ja Rule, Lil' Kim, Ludacris, Dave Chappelle, Gene Simmons, Ashanti, Wyclef Jean, Moby, Dave Navarro, Travis Barker and Mariah Carey.

Flex also travels to America's biggest car shows to document the latest innovations in automotive technology, and tries out new hydraulic systems, rims, engines, and other high-valued accessories. Flex and his team of car experts explain to viewers how they can customize their own rides and keep up with the latest trends in car customization.

In its first season on Spike TV, Ride with Funkmaster Flex was a hit with the network's target demographics. The series drew 150% more viewers who were male 18-34 and 100% more male 18-49 compared to the timeslot the previous year on Spike TV. It was also the first hip-hop influenced urban automotive reality show that paved the way and set the standard for shows such as Pimp My Ride, Rides, The Kustomizer, Unique Whips, King of Cars, Street Customs, Automotive Rhythms, Fast Machines with Funkmaster Flex, Unique Autosports: Miami among others.

== Similar Shows ==
- American Hot Rod
- American Chopper
- American Chopper: Senior vs. Junior
- Rides
- Pimp My Ride
- The Kustomizer
- Unique Autosports: Miami
- Unique Whips
- King of Cars
- Street Customs
- Inside West Coast Customs
- Limo Bob
- Fast Machines with Funkmaster Flex
- Funk Flex Full Throttle
- Unique Rides
- The Auto Firm with Alex Vega
- RMD Garage
- Texas Metal
