= Mike Rowe =

American television personality (born 1962)

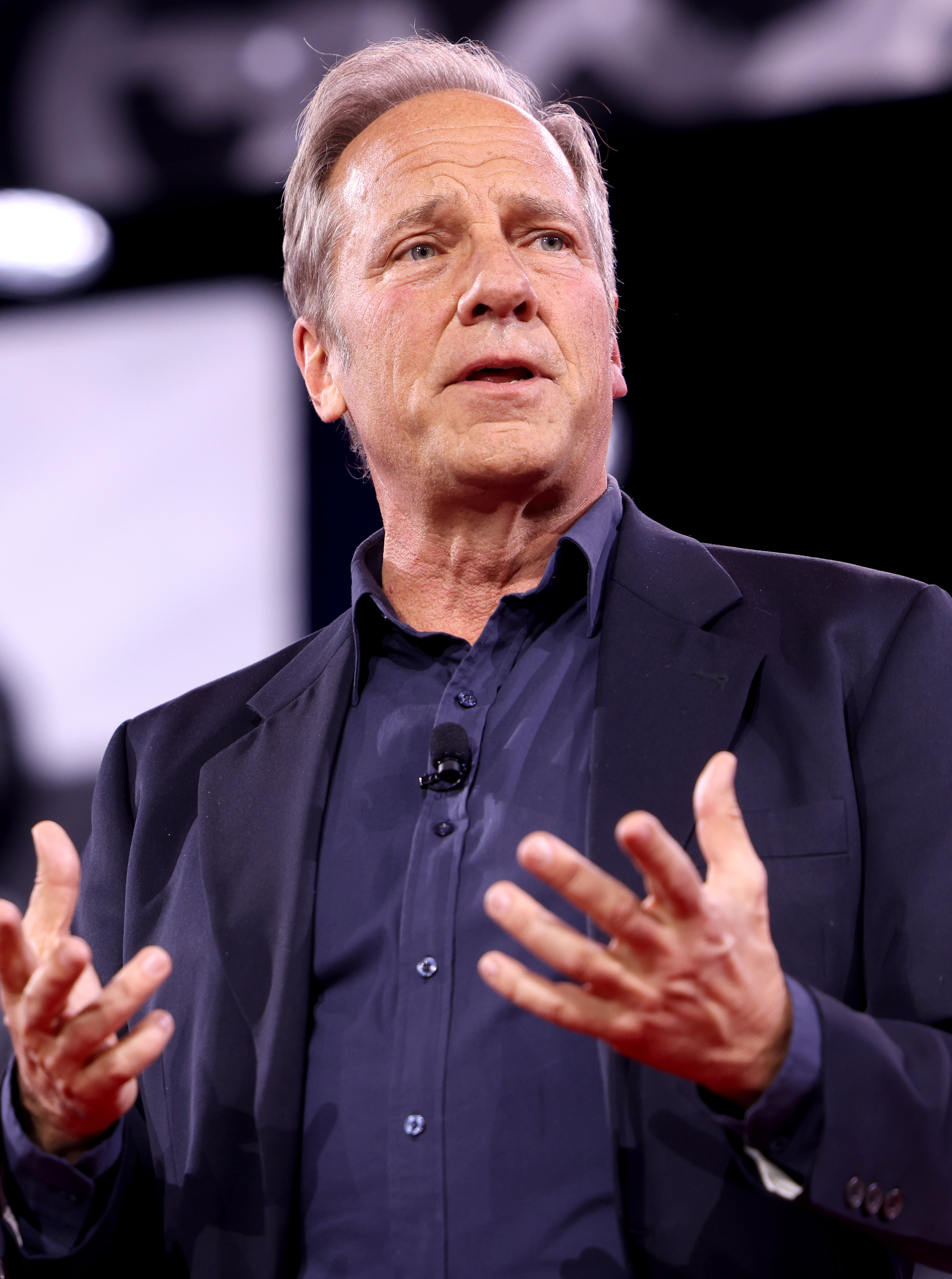
- Rowe in 2025
- Born: March 18, 1962 (age 64); Baltimore County, Maryland, U.S.
- Education: Towson University
- Occupations: Television host, narrator
- Television: Dirty Jobs; Somebody's Gotta Do It
- Rowe's voice What he learned from hosting Dirty Jobs
- Website: www.mikerowe.com

Michael Gregory Rowe (born March 18, 1962) is an American television host and narrator. He is known for his work on the Discovery Channel series Dirty Jobs and the series Somebody's Gotta Do It originally developed for CNN. He hosted a series produced for Facebook called Returning the Favor in which he found people doing good deeds and did something for them in return. He also hosts a podcast titled The Way I Heard It with Mike Rowe.

Rowe has narrated programs on the Discovery Channel, The Science Channel, and National Geographic Channel such as Deadliest Catch, How the Universe Works, and Shark Week. He has also appeared in commercials for firms such as the Ford Motor Company.

== Early life ==
Rowe was born and raised in Baltimore County, Maryland, to John and Peggy Rowe, who were both teachers. In commercials for Dirty Jobs he stated that the show is a tribute to his father and grandfather. He became an Eagle Scout in 1979 in Troop 16 in suburban Overlea and he read to students at the Maryland School for the Blind during his service project for Eagle Scout. He cites this as one of the reasons that he became interested in narrating and writing.

Rowe attended Kenwood Presbyterian Church in Nottingham, Maryland, which his parents still regularly attend. He graduated from Overlea High School in 1980, where he excelled in theater and singing. He then studied at Essex Community College. In 1985, he graduated from Towson University with a degree in communication studies.

== Television career ==
=== As host ===
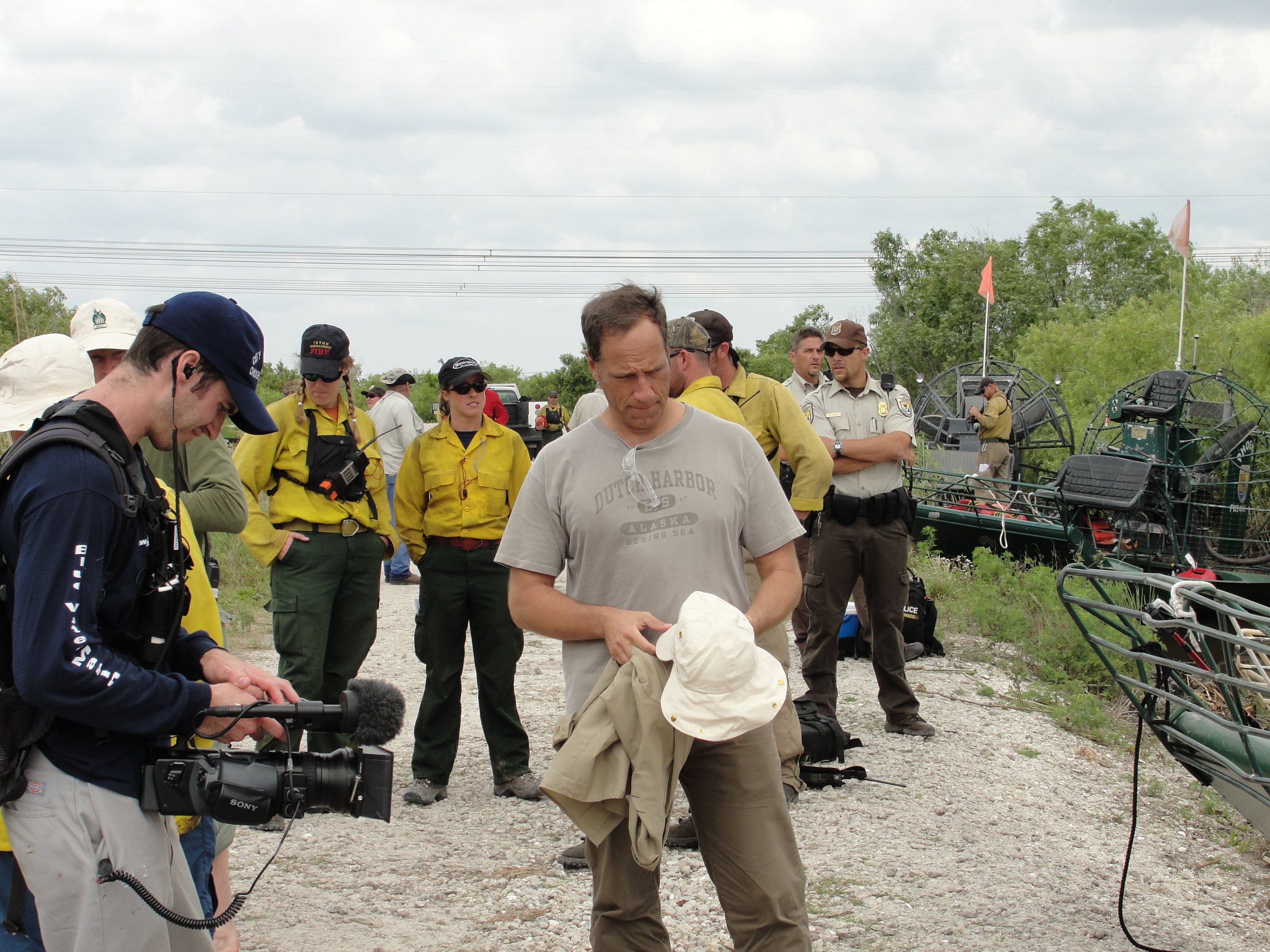
Rowe on Dirty Jobs in April 2010 with the U.S. Fish and Wildlife Service

In the early 1990s, Rowe hosted the CD-ROM music trivia game Radio Active (as "Bobby Arpeggio") for defunct Sanctuary Woods. During the same period, he was an on-air host for the home-shopping TV network QVC. Rowe has claimed that QVC fired him three times, rehiring him each time until he finally left of his own accord in 1993. When told in a 2008 episode of Dirty Jobs that the gourds he was working on would be sold via QVC, he said he was familiar with the corporation and proceeded to ad-lib a sales pitch for them.

In the 1990s, Rowe hosted Channel 999 instructional guide for the defunct PrimeStar satellite television service.

In 2002, Rowe hosted Worst Case Scenarios for TBS.

From 2001 to 2004, Rowe hosted The Most for The History Channel. From 2001 to 2005, Rowe hosted Evening Magazine on KPIX-TV in San Francisco. During this time, he appeared in a news segment called "Somebody's Gotta Do It", profiling a number of unpleasant professions; the concept later grew into Dirty Jobs. Rowe's first work with the Discovery Channel included a trip to the Valley of the Golden Mummies to host Egypt Week Live!, where he explored ancient tombs live with Zahi Hawass, an Egyptian archaeologist.

Dirty Jobs, for which Rowe is probably best known, ran on the Discovery Channel for 10 seasons, from 2003 to 2012, airing 179 episodes in total.

In September 2012, Rowe hosted a three-part series How Booze Built America on the Discovery Channel.

CNN announced on April 10, 2014, that Rowe would host Somebody's Gotta Do It, a new "Original Series" that began in the fall of 2014 lineup. The final season aired on the TBN in 2018. Rowe highlights "unique individuals" in their respective passionate undertakings, whether it be work, hobby, or fanaticism. Somebody's Gotta Do It is produced by Craig Piligian's Pilgrim Studios. In mid-July 2020, Discovery Channel aired Dirty Jobs: Rowe'd Trip, a four-episode miniseries, billed as "part reunion, part road-trip, part look-back-special".

Rowe has also hosted On-Air TV for American Airlines, No Relation for FX, and New York Expeditions for PBS.

=== As narrator ===
In addition to hosting programs, Rowe has an extensive background as a narrator. His work with Discovery Channel includes narrating American Chopper, American Hot Rod, Deadliest Catch, Wild Pacific, Silver Rush, Ghost Lab, How the Universe Works, and Syfy's Ghost Hunters. Rowe hosted the Discovery Channel's annual Shark Week in 2006 and 2008, and has hosted the special You Spoof Discovery, an amateur parody video special which poked fun at some of the popular series on the Discovery Channel's lineup.

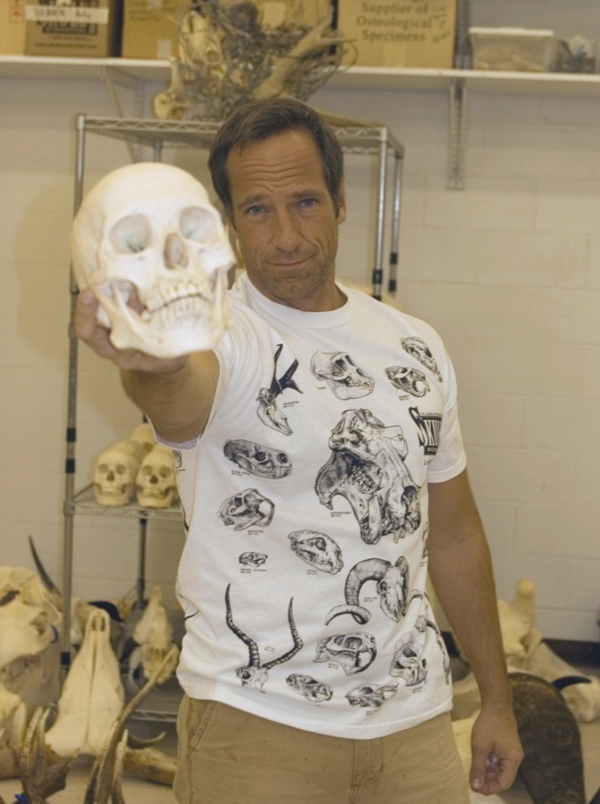
Rowe poses for a photo during filming at Skulls Unlimited International

Rowe was originally tapped to be the on-screen host of the Discovery Channel's Deadliest Catch, a show about crab fishing in the Bering Sea, and shot footage aboard several crab boats in addition to narrating the series. When Dirty Jobs was picked up by Discovery, he was told to choose which show he wanted to appear in on-screen. Rowe chose to host Dirty Jobs and narrate Deadliest Catch; the footage of him on the boats was not used in the series, although he did appear in a season finale of Deadliest Catch, interviewing the boat captains. Rowe hosted a related show about life on the Bering Sea, a 2007 miniseries, After the Catch, a show which has continued after each season of Deadliest Catch.

Other narration work by Rowe includes Mystery Diagnosis, Drydock: A Cruise Ship Reborn, Southern Steel, Powertool Drag Racing, Scavengers Rock (Animal Planet), Airplane Repo and the opening of Ghost Hunters, a Syfy series from the producers of American Chopper. Additionally, Rowe has done voiceover work for the reality television show The Ultimate Fighter and the NASCAR pre-race show for the 2009 Chase on ESPN.

From December 21, 2009, to June 2012, Rowe was the announcer on ABC World News with Diane Sawyer.

He hosts a podcast called The Way I Heard It with Mike Rowe, in partnership with Red Seat Ventures.

=== Additional appearances ===
On October 7, 2007, Rowe appeared on Fox's American Dad! as the voice of a meter maid.

Rowe appeared on an episode of Sesame Street (Season 39) in a segment called "Dirtiest Jobs With Mike Rowe", which aired on October 13, 2008. Rowe visits Sesame Street to find the dirtiest job, which happens to belong to Oscar. Rowe must do all the things Oscar does. His tasks include finding and counting stinky cheese, sorting trash, and giving his pet pig, Spot, a mud bath. To Oscar's chagrin, Rowe does not want to stop, as he is having too much fun.

Rowe spoke to more than 70,000 scouts, leaders, and visitors at the 2010 National Scout Jamboree in Fort A.P. Hill, Virginia, and a second time at the 2013 National Scout Jamboree in Bechtel Summit. Rowe, an Eagle Scout, spoke to the crowd about the importance of being physically and mentally clean, but emphasized the need for all scouts to get dirty.

In 2012, Rowe appeared in the "Baxter & Sons" episode of the ABC sitcom Last Man Standing playing the role of Jim Baxter, the brother of Tim Allen's character.

In June 2013, Rowe spoke to the delegates at the 49th Annual National Leadership and Skills Conference for SkillsUSA in Kansas City, Missouri. He addressed the crowd of 15,000+ at Kemper Arena about the importance to "Work Smart and Hard".

In 2017, Rowe was a guest on the premiere episode of Season 39 for This Old House. This first project of the season spotlights "Generation Next", an organization that is training young people to learn the building trades. Rowe, through his "mikeroweWORKS" foundation and the "This Old House" people are supporting this initiative.

Rowe recorded a Christmas song with John Rich in 2021 titled "Santa's Gotta Dirty Job".

=== As pitchman ===
Beginning in March 2007, he was featured in several Ford Motor Company F-Series truck commercials, presented in a style similar to Dirty Jobs, including one for Ford Sync. In the summer of 2009, he appeared in advertisements for Ford and Lincoln-Mercury vehicles that used the tagline, "Why Ford. Why Now."

On July 26, 2010, Rowe became the spokesperson for Caterpillar, "spending time with Caterpillar customers and dealers to get a real world perspective on their jobs and how the two partner to be successful."

In 2011, Rowe appeared with his parents in television spots for Viva paper towels.

In May 2025, the mobile virtual network operator PureTalk announced that Rowe had become a spokesperson for the company.

== Trade activism ==
On Labor Day 2008, Rowe launched the mikeroweWORKS Foundation, which is focused on the decline in the blue collar trades and the crumbling state of infrastructure. A trade resource center has been launched and provides information, resources, and forums for people interested in learning about, or pursuing a career in, the trades, as well as a new blog aggregator for the trades and construction industry, called the "Trades Hub", which launched in April 2011.

On September 29, 2010, Rowe and the Association of Equipment Manufacturers started a campaign called "I Make America", aimed to create jobs in the manufacturing sector by encouraging infrastructure investment and export agreements. The group stated that the campaign would improve the economy and global competitiveness of the United States.

In May 2011, Rowe testified on the issue of trade activism before the U.S. Senate Committee on Commerce, Science and Transportation.

Rowe has contributed video content to The Alabama Construction Recruitment Institute's trade-worker recruiting campaign GoBuildAlabama.com, culminating in an Iron Bowl-themed commercial broadcast on local CBS affiliates during Thanksgiving weekend 2010.

Rowe sent a letter to President Obama at the start of his first term offering to help promote the three million "shovel ready" jobs promised during the campaign, suspecting it might be a tough sell, "given the country's then-current relationship with the shovel." He did not receive a reply. During the 2012 presidential election, Rowe contacted GOP candidate Mitt Romney and appeared with him on September 26, 2012, at a campaign event in Ohio. "He's non partisan, he's not here to endorse me, he's not here to add support to one campaign or another," Romney said of his guest. "He's here to talk about his ideas about how to help America create more jobs."

In spring 2013, mikeroweWORKS launched its newest initiative, Profoundly Disconnected. Rowe states, "many of the best opportunities that exist today require a skill, not a diploma. The purpose of this site is to promote that simple truth." While in high school in 1979, Rowe saw a poster in his guidance counselor's office that read "Work Smart, Not Hard". He hated it so much, he changed it to "Work Smart AND Hard"; he now prints such posters and wants them hanging all over the country to get people to change the way hard work is perceived.

Rowe describes himself as a cheerleader for both blue-collar workers and white-collar workers, hoping to promote individual initiative and positive thinking throughout the U.S. economy. He has stated that he feels alienated from the current U.S. political system given that both business owners and regular workers receive, in his opinion, unfair criticism, with issues such as geographical mismatching and a lack of job training causing unemployment.

His mikeroweWORKS Foundation has received financial support from Charles Koch.

In April 2021, when asked about the debate about raising the minimum wage, Rowe said, "I worry that the path to a skilled trade can be compromised when you offer an artificially high wage for, I hate the expression, but an unskilled job."

Following on his activism on blue collar trades, he was presented with a $10 million dollar check at The Pentagon by Michael Duffey (undersecretary of defense for acquisition and sustainment) and Michael Cadenazzi (assistant secretary of defense for industrial base policy) to formally launch the Build Freedom Initiative.

== Personal life ==
Rowe sang professionally with the Baltimore Opera. A former resident of San Francisco, California, Rowe now resides in nearby Belvedere, California. A voice-over for a Walmart ad in 2014 sparked death threats from fans. In 2016, he was subject to rumors describing his death, leading him to quote the famous line attributed to Mark Twain: "Reports of my death are greatly exaggerated." He has stated that he is a gun owner and a supporter of the U.S. 2nd Amendment, but not a member of the National Rifle Association because he is "not much of a joiner". He is in a long-term relationship, but not married.

== Awards and honors ==
Rowe was the first winner of the Critics' Choice Television Award for Best Reality Show Host in 2011. In June 2012, Rowe was awarded the Distinguished Eagle Scout Award by the Boy Scouts of America.

In 2017, Rowe was made an Honorary Lifetime Member of the Barbershop Harmony Society.

Rowe received the Outstanding Host for a Daytime Program award for Returning the Favor at the 2020 Daytime Emmy awards.

== Filmography ==
=== Television ===
Year	Title	Role	Notes	Source
2000–2004	The Most	Host & narrator	History Channel	
2002	Worst Case Scenarios	Host	TBS	
2002–2010	American Chopper	Narrator	Discovery Channel	
2003	Incredible Basements	Host & narrator	HGTV	
2003–2012, 2020–2023	Dirty Jobs	Host	Discovery Channel	
2004	American Hot Rod	Narrator	The Learning Channel and Discovery Channel	
2004–2010, 2021–present	Ghost Hunters	Narrator	A&E Discovery+	
2005–present	Deadliest Catch	Narrator	Discovery Channel	
2005–2010	The Ultimate Fighter	Narrator	Spike TV	
2006	Shark Week	Host	Discovery Channel	
2007–2012	After the Catch	Host	Discovery Channel	
2007	American Dad!	Meter Maid	Season 3, episode 2	
2008–2010	Ghost Hunters International	Narrator	Syfy	
2009	Wild Pacific	Himself	Discovery Channel	
2009-2011	Ghost Lab	Narrator	Discovery Channel	
2010, 2014–2023	How the Universe Works	Narrator	Seasons 1, 3, 4, 6–11	
2011	Human Planet	Narrator	Discovery Channel	
2012	How Booze Built America	Himself	Discovery Channel	
2012	Last Man Standing	Jim Baxter	Episode 18	
2013–2014, 2019–present	Bering Sea Gold	Host	Discovery Channel	
2013–2015	Airplane Repo	Narrator	Discovery Channel	
2013	Bering Sea Gold: Under The Ice	Host	Discovery Channel	
2013	Huckabee	Himself	TBN	
2013	Real Time with Bill Maher	Himself	S11 E22, #289	
2013–present	C.R.A.P.	Host	web series	
2014	Building America	Host & narrator	TheBlaze	
2014–2015; 2018	Somebody's Gotta Do It	Host	CNN; TBN	
2016	America's Greatest Makers	Guest judge	TBS	
2017–2021	Returning the Favor	Host	Facebook Watch	
2021	Six Degrees with Mike Rowe	Host	Discovery+	
2021–present	How America Works	Host & narrator	Fox Business	
2024	Tuttle Twins	Himself	Libertas Institute	
2024	Something to Stand For	Himself		
2026	Real Time with Bill Maher	Himself	S24 E22, #737	

== Written works ==
- Rowe, Mike (2019). The Way I Heard It. Gallery Books. ISBN 978-1982130855.
