= Somebody's Gotta Do It =

Reality television series

- Genre: Reality television
- Starring: Mike Rowe
- Composer: Vanacore Music
- Country of origin: United States
- No. of seasons: 4
- No. of episodes: 32

Production
- Running time: 40–44 minutes (on CNN); 26–27 minutes (on TBN)
- Production company: Pilgrim Films & Television

Original release
- Network: CNN (2014–2015); TBN (2018)
- Release: October 8, 2014 – July 21, 2018

Somebody's Gotta Do It is a program that originally aired on CNN and later aired on TBN with host Mike Rowe. The show premiered on October 8, 2014. On May 13, 2016, Mike Rowe announced on his website MikeRowe.com that he and CNN had agreed to end production of the show after three seasons. A fourth season was picked by TBN.

== Format ==
According to the CNN press release on the show, the show ”brings viewers face-to-face with men and women who march to the beat of a different drum. In each episode, Rowe visits unique individuals and joins them in their respective undertakings, paying tribute to innovators, do-gooders, entrepreneurs, collectors, fanatics–people who simply have to do it. This show is about passion, purpose, and occasionally, hobbies that get a little out of hand."

== History ==
The show has its origins from a KPIX-TV news magazine segment on Evening Magazine titled "Somebody's Gotta Do It" which Rowe hosted. That segment was pitched to Discovery Channel in the early 2000s. Ultimately Discovery decided it only wanted to feature the dirty part of the segment and made a show out of it, which would become Dirty Jobs.

On May 6, 2013, Rowe posted on Facebook that he was open to creating a new show that is similar to Dirty Jobs titled Somebody's Gotta Do It. Rowe said that if half the people on his Facebook fan page said "Hey, Mike, here's 10 bucks for jet fuel and basic production costs", he'd "put the band back together and start shooting 'Somebody's Gotta Do It' tomorrow". On April 10, 2014, Rowe announced on his Facebook page that CNN had decided to air the show. Filming on the show started on May 22, 2014. On August 23, 2014, Rowe announced that it would debut on October 8, 2014, at 9 pm ET. On September 29, 2014, CNN made the first episode available to watch on their website before its debut date. On November 13, 2014, Somebody's Gotta Do It was renewed for a second season. Season two debuted on April 9, 2015. Season three debuted on September 27, 2015. After season 3 ended, CNN canceled the show and Rowe began looking for an alternative channel to air a new season of the show.

Somebody's Gotta Do It is now airing in reruns on TBN featuring one reedited half hour episode from the first three seasons. A fourth season was announced and started airing on May 26, 2018. A new episode about SkillsUSA aired on June 23, 2018, on TBN.

== Series overview ==
Season	Episodes	Originally released	
Season	Episodes	First released	Last released
1	8	October 8, 2014	December 22, 2014
2	8	April 9, 2015	June 4, 2015
3	8	September 27, 2015	November 15, 2015
4	8	May 26, 2018	July 21, 2018

== Episodes ==
=== Season 1 (2104) ===
No. overall	No. in season	Title	Original release date	U.S. viewers
1	1	"Backstage Las Vegas"	October 8, 2014	943,000
Mike travels to Las Vegas to find out how the aquatic show Le Rêve works and is performed. The episode also features Leila's Hair Museum of Independence, Missouri.
2	2	"Raising Crane"	October 15, 2014	772,000
Mike travels to the Patuxent Wildlife Research Center in Anne Arundel County, Maryland, to learn about how they repopulate cranes. Mike also learns how to create neon signs in Austin, Texas.
3	3	"Oyster Orgy"	October 22, 2014	469,000
Mike discovers how they are repopulating oysters in the Chesapeake Bay. Mike visits the Marching Cobras of Kansas City, Missouri.
4	4	"The Real Survivor"	October 29, 2014	400,000
Mike learns life saving skills in Tehachapi, California. Mike also learns about watermelon seed spitting in Luling, Texas.
5	5	"Pageant of the Masters"	November 12, 2014	465,000
Mike visits the Pageant of the Masters in Laguna Beach, California. Mike travels to Lancaster County, Pennsylvania, to visit D'Artagnan Gourmet Foods and their specialty chickens.
6	6	"Life Savers"	November 19, 2014	410,000
Mike visits Disaster City on the Brayton Fire Training Field located in College Station, Texas, to learn how life saving rescues operate. Mike also visits Luling, Texas, and the Tiny Texas Houses company where they make small houses.
7	7	"Mutter Museum"	December 10, 2014	485,000
Mike visits the Mütter Museum in Philadelphia. Mike also visits Parisi Artisan Coffee in Kansas City, Missouri.
8	8	"Goat Cheese Queen"	December 22, 2014	470,000
Mike visits Humboldt County, California and the goat cheese queen. Mike also visits a dog groomer in Columbus, Georgia.

=== Season 2 (2015) ===
No. overall	No. in season	Title	Original release date	U.S. viewers
9	1	"Bullfighting"	April 9, 2015	651,000
Mike spends time with bullfighters in Chicago, learns how to make craft chocolate in Arcata, California, and visits an Abraham Lincoln impersonator in Mount Vernon, Iowa.
10	2	"River Rescue"	April 16, 2015	596,000
Mike visits people who clean trash out of rivers in New Albany, Indiana, learns how to ice sculpt in Franksville, Wisconsin, and travels to Pine, Colorado to try blacksmithing.
11	3	"Mexican Wrestling Meets Burlesque"	April 23, 2015	382,000
In Los Angeles Mike participates in Mexican wrestling that has elements of burlesque, tries the sport of curling in Madison, Wisconsin, and learns how to make glassware in Arcata, California.
12	4	"Highway Boulder Crew"	May 7, 2015	400,000
In Ojai, California Mike joins a highway boulder removal crew, then visits Fort McHenry in Baltimore, and participates in a water ballet about Mary Young Pickersgill creating the Star-Spangled Banner in Baltimore.
13	5	"Monster Truck Rally"	May 14, 2015	421,000
In Milwaukee Mike visits a monster truck rally, tries bycycle polo in Oakland, California, and meets a professional forager in Bodega Bay, California.
14	6	"Navy Seabees"	May 21, 2015	371,000
In Hattiesburg, Mississippi Mike trains with the Navy Seabees, visits a European martial arts school in Santa Clara, California, and meets an Edgar Allan Poe impersonator in Baltimore.
15	7	"Chicago Ice Rescue"	May 28, 2015	445,000
In Chicago Mike visits the Chicago Fire Department and participates in an ice water rescue, visits a traditional Russian bathhouse in Chicago, and meets a Voodoo priestess in New Orleans.
16	8	"Low Riders"	June 4, 2015	401,000
Mike visits Paramount, California and rides in a low rider car, meets man who makes guitars out of old cigar boxes in Jackson, Mississippi, and then sees how high quality bobbleheads are made in Atlanta.

=== Season 3 (2015) ===
No. overall	No. in season	Title	Original release date	U.S. viewers
17	1	"Dude Perfect"	September 27, 2015	360,000
Mike visits Frisco, Texas and the members of Dude Perfect, the Ladew Topiary Gardens in Monkton, Maryland, and Churchill Downs in Louisville, Kentucky.
18	2	"Demolition Ranch"	October 4, 2015	343,000
Mike visits a demolition and special effects ranch in Austin, Texas, the Field Museum of Natural History in Chicago, and meets a man who makes rock towers in Ventura, California.
19	3	"Extreme Soap Box"	October 11, 2015	326,000
Mike visits men who race gravity racers in Catonsville, Maryland, the Archery Outpost in Artesia, California to shoot arrows, and the Maker Faire in San Mateo, California.
20	4	"Prairie Dog Protector"	October 18, 2015	322,000
Mike travels to Caprock Canyons State Park and Trailway to see how prairie dog relocation is done. Mike then visits Los Angeles and a graffiti artist. In the last segment Mike visits Chicago to learn how to body paint.
21	5	"Derby Dolls"	October 25, 2015	323,000
Mike visits and plays in a female Roller derby team, the San Diego Derby Dolls in San Diego. Mike helps kill rats in New York City and visits Mount Vernon, Iowa and a man who is trying to breed heritage German style pigs.
22	6	"Ascending the Giants"	November 1, 2015	257,000
Mike measures giant chinquapin trees in Azalea, Oregon, Mike then learns how to Flyboard in San Diego, and Mike visits the Mortuary Lift Company in Cedar Rapids, Iowa.
23	7	"Drag Racing"	November 8, 2015	286,000
Mike learns to drag race in Sophia, North Carolina, Mike's crew visits Hillsboro, Oregon and a man who lives on an airplane, and Mike visits Medford, Oregon and a tree house resort.
24	8	"Golden Knights"	November 15, 2015	275,000
Mike learns how to skydive with the Golden Knights in Fort Bragg, North Carolina. Mike also visits Bandon, Oregon and people who pick up beach trash and create art from it. In the last segment Mike visits his hometown of Baltimore and meets people who promote tourism there.

=== Season 4 ===
No. overall	No. in season	Title	Original release date	U.S. viewers
25	1	"USS John C. Stennis"	May 26, 2018	N/A
Mike visits the USS John C. Stennis in an hour long episode.
26	2	"Hair Museum; Dog Colorist"	June 2, 2018	N/A
Mike visits a museum dedicated to locks of hair, some with accompanying pictures and family trees - used as an arcane method of genealogy tracking. Next he visits a unique dog groomer who paints pooches after giving them cuts.
27	3	"Forager, Pig Farmer"	June 9, 2018	N/A
28	4	"Curling"	June 16, 2018	N/A
Mike goes to Wisconsin to learn the fine art of curling from Olympic coach and gold medalist Steve Brown.
29	5	"Skills USA"	June 23, 2018	N/A
Mike visits a SkillsUSA trade show in Kansas City, Missouri to practice welding, baking, and broadcasting.
30	6	"Cattle Drive"	July 7, 2018	N/A
31	7	"STEAM Carnival"	July 14, 2018	N/A
Mike visits the STEAM Carnival headquarters in Los Angeles.
32	8	"Hot Air Balloon and Hang Glider"	July 21, 2018	N/A
