= Battlefish =

American reality television show

- Genre: Reality; Fishing
- Country of origin: United States
- Original language: English
- No. of seasons: 1
- No. of episodes: 8

Production
- Executive producers: Craig Piligian; Mike Nichols
- Cinematography: Kendall Whelpton
- Running time: 38–46 minutes
- Production company: Pilgrim Media Group

Original release
- Network: Netflix
- Release: September 21, 2018

Battlefish is an American reality television show that follows the pursuits of several fishing boats as they search the Pacific Ocean for albacore tuna. The eight-episode first season debuted on Netflix on September 21, 2018. The show is produced by Pilgrim Media Group.

The series documents five fishing crews along the coasts of Washington and Oregon during the 2017 fishing season.

== Episodes ==
No.	Title	Original release date
1	"The Battle Begins"	September 21, 2018
The albacore tuna fishing season kicks off with high hopes for some hefty hauls. Greenhorn Andre of the Judy S struggles.
2	"The Eclipse"	September 21, 2018
Everyone wonders how the solar eclipse will affect conditions. The Intrepid makes its first foray of the season. Andre's attitude becomes a problem.
3	"Fisherman's Code"	September 21, 2018
Malissa joins the Judy S as a deckhand to prove that she can "do the job better than a guy can." Oppor-Tuna-Ty’s Aaron mourns the loss of his daughter.
4	"Into the Deep End"	September 21, 2018
There's only a month and a half left in the season. The Intrepid crew discovers a hole in the boat and the TNT deals with a broken freezer.
5	"Battle Cry"	September 21, 2018
To add to an already difficult season, the Intrepid’s engine dies. Captain of the Ashley Nicole Justin returns home for the birth of his second son.
6	"The 24 Hour War"	September 21, 2018
Captain Jake is unsure about the Intrepid's new deckhand. Meanwhile on the Judy S, Malissa sustains a painful injury but it doesn’t slow her down.
7	"Storm Front"	September 21, 2018
With red skies in the morning, sailors take warning. A storm is on the horizon but the fleet still has to take advantage of what remains of the season.
8	"Final Battle"	September 21, 2018
Hopes for one last big haul remain. The Oppor-Tuna-Ty’s Aaron speaks for everyone when he says this was his most challenging season yet.
