= Returning the Favor =

- Genre: Reality
- Created by: Mike Rowe
- Presented by: Mike Rowe
- Country of origin: United States
- Original language: English
- No. of seasons: 4
- No. of episodes: 105

Production
- Executive producers: Michael Rourke; Christopher Spry; Jacob Huddleston; Mike Rowe; Mary Sullivan
- Running time: 18–26 minutes
- Production companies: Hudsun Media; Mike Rowe Works

Original release
- Network: Facebook Watch
- Release: August 29, 2017 – September 29, 2020

Returning the Favor is an American reality web series that premiered on August 28, 2017 on Facebook Watch. It follows Mike Rowe as he travels across the United States in search of people who are giving back to their communities. At the end of each episode, those being profiled receive a surprise that allows them to do even more of whatever kind of good work they are doing. In July 2018, Facebook renewed the series for a fourth season which premiered on January 14, 2020. The show was canceled after four seasons in January 2021.

== Production ==
Rowe credits his mother as being a source of inspiration for bringing his show to Facebook. After posting a video of his parents and monitoring how many people viewed it after it was posted to his Facebook page, he realized the potential audience reach that the social media site could afford.

On July 5, 2017, it was announced that Facebook had greenlit the production. The number and length of episodes had yet to be determined at the time. The show is referred to internally by Facebook as one of their "hero shows" alongside other programs such as Ball in the Family and Strangers.

On November 27, 2017, it was reported that Facebook had renewed the show for a second season consisting of 13 episodes. Facebook's vice-president of media partnerships Nick Grudin has said that the show has worked well on the platform because Rowe is "a very engaged creator, thinking through how to participate in natural ways with the audience in order to make and develop the storyline." Between the first and second seasons, Returning the Favor released seven short videos, labeled as "Micro Editions", that ran between 6 and 7 minutes in length. Some of these mini-episodes followed up on subjects covered in the first season.

On July 25, 2018, it was announced during the Television Critics Association's annual summer press tour that Facebook had renewed the series for a third season. On November 23, 2018, it was reported that season three would premiere on November 27, 2018.

Facebook cancelled the show on January 27, 2021.

== Episodes ==
Season	Episodes	Originally released	
Season	Episodes	First released	Last released
1	10	August 29, 2017	October 24, 2017
2	24	December 19, 2017	August 28, 2018
3	23	November 27, 2018	August 26, 2019
4	TBA	January 14, 2020	TBA

=== Season 1 (2017) ===
No. overall	No. in season	Title	Original release date
1	1	"Donovan Discovers"	August 29, 2017
2	2	"Operation Combat Bikesaver"	August 29, 2017
3	3	"Girls Build"	September 5, 2017
4	4	"Raising the Roughriders"	September 12, 2017
5	5	"Loving You Through It"	September 19, 2017
6	6	"A Hero's Retreat"	September 26, 2017
7	7	"Feeding the First Responders"	October 3, 2017
8	8	"The Music Man"	October 10, 2017
9	9	"Pens and Pencils All in a Rowe"	October 17, 2017
10	10	"Wedding Dress Rescue"	October 24, 2017

=== Season 2 (2017–18) ===
No. overall	No. in season	Title	Original release date
11	1	"The Cop Who Saved Christmas"	December 19, 2017
12	2	"Sleep in Heavenly Peace"	February 13, 2018
13	3	"Against All Odds"	February 20, 2018
14	4	"The Garage Of Blessings"	February 27, 2018
15	5	"Alton's Toy Story"	March 6, 2018
16	6	"Tough Love"	March 13, 2018
17	7	"Serving Up Second Chances"	March 20, 2018
18	8	"Bully Rehab"	March 27, 2018
19	9	"Soldier Dogs"	April 3, 2018
20	10	"Rebuilding the Big Easy"	April 10, 2018
21	11	"Honoring the Brave"	April 17, 2018
22	12	"Adah's Dirty Laundry"	April 24, 2018
23	13	"All The Shingle Ladies"	May 1, 2018
24	14	"The Girl Who Feeds The Hungry"	June 19, 2018
25	15	"Grounds Of Love"	June 26, 2018
26	16	"Saving Kids On The Farm"	July 3, 2018
27	17	"Beauty And The Beets"	July 10, 2018
28	18	"The Can Lady"	July 17, 2018
29	19	"To Serve And Protect"	July 24, 2018
30	20	"Veterans Helping Veterans"	July 31, 2018
31	21	"Food 4 Kids"	August 7, 2018
32	22	"In Memory of Ian"	August 14, 2018
33	23	"An American Second Chance"	August 21, 2018
34	24	"Standing with Coal Country"	August 28, 2018

=== Season 3 (2018-19) ===
No. overall	No. in season	Title	Original release date
35	1	"Saving our Veterans"	November 27, 2018
36	2	"Coach Of The Year"	December 4, 2018
37	3	"Raising the Youth of Detroit"	December 11, 2018
38	4	"The 89-Year-Old Golfer!"	December 18, 2018
39	5	"A Firefighter Christmas"	December 25, 2018
40	6	"Fences for Fido"	January 1, 2019
41	7	"The Weights Veterans Carry"	January 8, 2019
42	8	"Fighting for the Trades"	January 15, 2019
43	9	"The Bra Fairy"	January 22, 2019
44	10	"Every Kid Deserves A Birthday Party"	January 29, 2019
45	11	"The Mother Saving the South Side"	June 4, 2019
46	12	"An 82-Year-Old Small Town Hero"	June 11, 2019
47	13	"Shoes for Kids"	June 17, 2019
48	14	"A Big Guy With A Big Heart"	June 24, 2019
49	15	"Gold Star Mom"	July 1, 2019
50	16	"Giving Back: One Man's Fight Against Homelessness"	July 8, 2019
51	17	"The Firefighters Fiercest Fight"	July 15, 2019
52	18	"Feeding Our Farmers"	July 22, 2019
53	19	"The Snake Hunter"	July 29, 2019
54	20	"A Forgotten Neighborhood Fights Back"	August 5, 2019
55	21	"The NJ Woman Who Will Never Forget"	August 12, 2019
56	22	"Pin-Ups for Vets"	August 19, 2019
57	23	"One Soldier's Inspiration to Serve"	August 26, 2019

=== Season 4 (2020) ===
No. overall	No. in season	Title	Original release date
58	1	"A Bicycle Built For Blue"	January 14, 2020
59	2	"A Correction Officer's Tough Love"	January 21, 2020
60	3	"The Top Chef Delivering Joy"	January 27, 2020
61	4	"The Cowboy Who Cares"	February 3, 2020
62	5	"Amazing Grace and the Underdogs"	February 10, 2020
63	6	"Miracles for Moms"	February 17, 2020
64	7	"The Farmer Feeding the City"	February 24, 2020
65	8	"The Firefighter Providing Furniture"	March 2, 2020
66	9	"The Woman Changing the Foster Care System"	March 9, 2020
67	10	"More Heart Than Scars"	March 16, 2020
68	11	"The Drummer Helping the Trades"	September 8, 2020
69	12	"Tapping for the Troops"	September 15, 2020
70	13	TBA	September 22, 2020
71	14	TBA	September 29, 2020

== Awards ==
In November 2017, Returning the Favor was one of five shows cited by Got Your 6, an entertainment industry-affiliated veterans organization with a Got Your 6 certification. In recognizing the series, the organization specifically cited the pilot episode, featuring a former Army engineer running a therapeutic motorcycle building program for other veterans, and episode six, which featured a quadruple amputee Army veteran who runs an outdoor retreat for other veterans suffering from injuries.

== See also ==
- List of original programs distributed by Facebook Watch
