= Swamp Loggers =

American reality television series

- Genre: Reality
- Directed by: Paul Harrison
- Starring: Bobby Goodson, Justin Goodson, Dave Mueller, Simitrio Ruiz
- No. of seasons: 4
- No. of episodes: 35

Production
- Executive producers: Tim Pastore, Edward Barbini, Craig Piligian
- Producer: Paul Harrison
- Cinematography: Terence Pratt
- Running time: 60 Mins
- Production company: Pilgrim Films

Original release
- Network: Discovery Channel
- Release: 15 June 2009 – 10 January 2012

Swamp Loggers is an American reality television series originally broadcast on the Discovery Channel from 2009 to 2012 that follows the crew of Goodson's All Terrain Logging as they log the swamps of North Carolina. Much of the series was filmed in Pender County. The series was later shown in reruns on Quest, part of Discovery Channel operations in the United Kingdom and Ireland. The series is currently shown in reruns on the US Network Quest. In mid 2022 Goodson's All Terrain Logging closed, citing high fuel costs as the reason for closure. Their Facebook page still gets regular updates.

== Goodson's All Terrain Logging Crew ==
- Bobby Goodson - Owner
- Justin Goodson - Part Owner/Foreman (Bobby's son)
- Lori Goodson - Office Manager (Bobby's wife/Dave's sister)
- Dave Mueller - Loader Operator
- Simitrio Ruiz - Buncher/Feller Operator
- Durley Hicks - Clambunk Operator
- Joe "Monkey" Nagy - Truck Driver
- Milton "Bo" Malpass (a.k.a. "Bo-Bo") - Truck Driver
- Joy "Baby Doll" Craft - Truck Driver (Bo-Bo's sister)
- Gary Foy - Truck Driver
- Wayne Sowers - Truck Driver

== Show overview ==
Some of the running themes of the show include trying to get 100 loads of logs shipped out per week, which gets the crew a bonus of about $100, and a BBQ paid for by Bobby and cooked by Dave (75 loads is generally considered the "break even" point where Bobby's expenses are covered); the constant difficulties encountered with bad weather, poor road conditions, and equipment failures; as well as uncertainties concerning lumber buyers, land owners (from whose property Goodson's extract timber), and saw mills.

Another issue that was featured during several episodes was the emergency gall bladder surgery performed on truck driver "Bo-Bo", the effect on his family and co-workers, and his recovery. He has since returned to Goodson's with a clean bill of health.

== Episodes ==
1. "Cutting It Up in the Muck" (15 June 2009)
2. "Logging for Steak" (22 June 2009)
3. "Tough Times Ahead" (29 June 2009)
4. "Only the Strong Survive" (6 July 2009)

=== Season 1 ===
1. "Return to the Swamp" (15 January 2010)
2. "Money Pit" (22 January 2010)
3. "Waterlogged" (29 January 2010)
4. "Swamp Fever" (5 February 2010)
5. "The Storm" (12 February 2010)
6. "The Comeback Kid" (27 April 2010)
7. "Sink or Swim" (4 May 2010)
8. "Growing Pains" (11 May 2010)
9. "Rising Waters" (18 May 2010)
10. "Nowhere to Go" (25 May 2010)

=== Season 2 ===
1. "Crisis at the Mill" (8 October 2010)
2. "Split Tracks" (15 October 2010)
3. "Juggling Act" (22 October 2010)
4. "Down to the Wire" (29 October 2010)
5. "Rainy Days" (5 November 2010)
6. "Setbacks" (12 November 2010)
7. "Truck Wars" (19 November 2010)
8. "Put to the Test" (26 November 2010)
9. "Wake Up Call" (3 December 2010)
10. "Murphy's Law" (10 December 2010)

=== Season 3 ===
1. "Snow Days" (17 June 2011)
2. "Road Warriors" (24 June 2011)
3. "Land Dispute" (1 July 2011)
4. "Hell of a Week" (8 July 2011)
5. "Crisis of Faith" (15 July 2011)
6. "All In" (22 July 2011)
7. "Pulp Friction" (29 July 2011)
8. "Redemption Day " (5 September 2011)

=== Season 4 ===
1. "Buckle Down" (13 December 2011)
2. "No End in Sight" (20 December 2011)
3. "The Tipping Point" (27 December 2011)
4. "Blame Game" (3 January 2012)
5. "On the Move Again" (10 January 2012)
