= Something to Stand For =

2024 documentary film

Something to Stand for with Mike Rowe
- Movie poster
- Directed by: Jonathan Coussens
- Distributed by: Fathom Events
- Release date: August 25, 2024
- Running time: 96 minutes
- Language: English

Something to Stand For (2024) is a documentary film featuring Mike Rowe about heroes of historical events like the American Revolution, World War II, and the Civil rights movement.

An advance screening of the film was performed on June 17th, 2025, at Camp Pendleton. It was initially given a limited release run to coincide with Fourth of July celebrations, but was later release on the streaming service Angel.

== Reception ==
On the review aggregator website Rotten Tomatoes, 80% of 5 critics' reviews are positive, with an average rating of 7.3/10. Christian Toto described it as "corny, sincere and unfailing in its American optimism". Linda Cook compared the style of the documentary to Paul Harvey's The Rest of the Story.
