= Sleep in Heavenly Peace =

American nonprofit organization

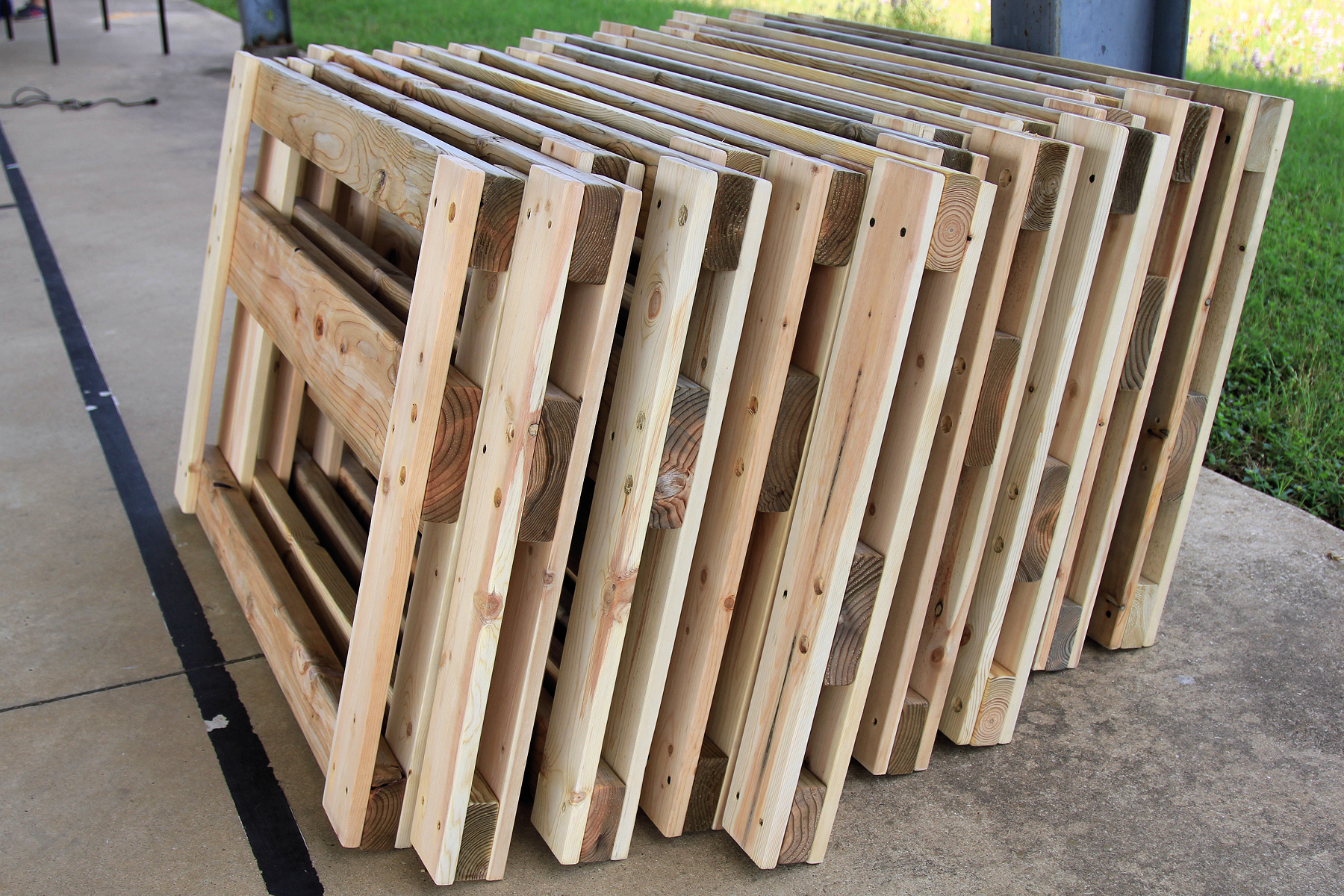
A stack of headboards created on a build day of the Austin, Texas chapter ready for delivery. Assembly of the bed is finished at the recipient's home.

Sleep in Heavenly Peace (SHP) is an American nonprofit 501(c)(3) organization that builds and delivers beds to children who don't have beds to sleep in. Luke and Heidi Mickelson founded SHP in 2012 in Twin Falls, Idaho. As of February 2022, the organization has 200 chapters around the United States and has built over 100,000 beds.

When Luke Mickelson was a youth group leader at his church, the group built beds for a member family of the church that was in need. He then built a bed with his family and offered it for free on Facebook. When people in the community heard about the effort, many donated bedding items, which encouraged Mickelson to move forward with the project. The organization grew at such a pace that Mickelson decided to leave his job and run SHP full-time.

The web television series Returning the Favor featured Mickelson and SHP on an episode in February 2018. CNN honored Mickelson as a CNN Hero of 2018.
