= You Spoof Discovery =

- You Spoof Discovery Logo (short)
- Narrated by: Mike Rowe
- Country of origin: United States
- Original language: English
- No. of episodes: 1

Production
- Running time: 45 Minutes
- Production company: Pilgrim Films & Television

Original release
- Network: Discovery Channel
- Release: February 25, 2007

You Spoof Discovery: The Ultimate Viewer-submitted Low-cost High-quality Extremely Entertaining Discovery Parody Special Hosted by Mike Rowe of Dirty Jobs, Who Also Narrates the Series American Chopper, American Hot Rod and Deadliest Catch, commonly shortened to You Spoof Discovery, is a one-hour special on the Discovery Channel which showed viewer-submitted parodies of Discovery Channel shows. The special premiered on February 25, 2007 and was hosted by Mike Rowe. Over 600 entries were submitted. The makers of parodies that made it on the air were given $500 from the Discovery Channel. According to Jane Root, then the president of Discovery Channel, the series was intended to be the beginning of a new wave of viewer-generated content.

== Parodied shows ==
Parodied shows include:

- American Chopper
- Cash Cab
- Deadliest Catch
- Dirty Jobs
- Future Weapons
- It Takes a Thief
- MythBusters
- Survivorman

== Advertising ==
A screenshot from the ad asking viewers to submit parodies

In summer of 2006, Discovery launched an ad featuring Mike Rowe asking viewers to submit parodies of their favorite Discovery shows. As he speaks, humorous things are drawn on the screen. For example, "I'm with stupid" will appear along with an arrow pointing up on Mike's shirt.

In early February 2007, Discovery started advertising the special. The ad used the full name of the show.

== See also ==
- Discovery Channel
- Mike Rowe
