= Airplane Repo =

- Genre: Reality television
- Narrated by: Mike Rowe - Pilot Episode and Season 1; Austin Keyes - Seasons 2, and 4
- Country of origin: United States
- Original language: English
- No. of seasons: 4
- No. of episodes: 31

Production
- Executive producers: Matt Renner; Dan Ilani; Ethan Prochnik; Joseph Boyle
- Running time: 40-45 minutes
- Production company: Undertow Films

Original release
- Network: Discovery Channel
- Release: December 12, 2010 – September 16, 2015

Airplane Repo is an American documentary-style fiction show following repossession agents hired by financial institutions to recover aircraft and occasionally other high-value assets from owners who have fallen behind on their payments.

== History ==
The Discovery Channel show first premiered on December 12, 2010, with a three episode pilot season. A two-year production hiatus elapsed before a full series premiered on July 11, 2013. Agents Nick Popovich (first three episodes), Ken Cage, Mike Kennedy, Kevin Lacey and Danny Thompson (from season one) appear in the show, along with Heather Sterzick, a former military air traffic controller (from season 2). Popovich claimed that later episodes are unrealistic. Beginning with Season 3, the episode intro states that events have been recaptured and some details have been changed. This is to help clarify and explain the use of fixed-security cameras, used in the repo events, in an attempt to duplicate or produce found footage style cinematography.

Season 2 premiered on August 22, 2014. Season 3 premiered on July 15, 2015.

== Episodes ==
=== Series overview ===
Season	Episodes	Originally aired	
Season	Episodes	First aired	Last aired
0	3	December 12, 2010	June 9, 2011
1	10	July 11, 2013	September 26, 2013
2	8	August 22, 2014	October 10, 2014
3	10	July 15, 2015	September 16, 2015

=== Season 0 (2010–11) ===
No. overall	No. in season	Title	Original release date
1	1	"Best in the Business"	December 12, 2010
2	2	"Not Ready to Fly"	April 21, 2011
3	3	"International Situation"	June 9, 2011

=== Season 1 (2013) ===
No. overall	No. in season	Title	Original release date
4	1	"We've Got an Emergency Situation"	July 11, 2013
5	2	"Spies in the Night"	July 17, 2013
6	3	"Armed and Airborne"	July 25, 2013
7	4	"Narrow Escape"	August 1, 2013
8	5	"Alone in Alaska"	August 15, 2013
9	6	"Undercover and Out of Time"	August 22, 2013
10	7	"Mid-Air Collision"	August 29, 2013
11	8	"No Rescue Repo"	September 5, 2013
12	9	"Flying Blind"	September 19, 2013
13	10	"Repo Roulette"	September 26, 2013

=== Season 2 (2014) ===
No. overall	No. in season	Title	Original release date	US viewers (millions)
14	1	"Armed on Arrival"	August 22, 2014	0.905
15	2	"Repo Rat Race"	August 29, 2014	1.097
16	3	"The Blonde Bomber"	September 5, 2014	1.285
17	4	"Panic at 10,000"	September 12, 2014	1.017
18	5	"Blood and Mud"	September 19, 2014	1.155
19	6	"Wounded Warbird"	September 30, 2014	0.889
20	7	"Flying Blind"	October 3, 2014	0.947
21	8	"Get Rich or Die Flyin'"	October 10, 2014	1.049

=== Season 3 (2015) ===
No. overall	No. in season	Title	Original release date	US viewers (millions)
22	1	"Ken Gets Played"	July 15, 2015	0.950
23	2	"South of the Border"	July 22, 2015	1.079
24	3	"Two If By Air, One If By Sea"	July 29, 2015	0.954
25	4	"Mid-air Repo"	August 5, 2015	1.072
26	5	"Saint Croix Swipe"	August 12, 2015	1.236
27	6	"No Safe Harbor"	August 19, 2015	1.129
28	7	"Hired Guns"	August 26, 2015	1.124
29	8	"Diving for Repos"	September 2, 2015	1.119
30	9	"Guns, Girls & Gambles"	September 9, 2015	1.244
31	10	"Repo 911"	September 16, 2015	0.861

== Broadcast ==
In Australia, the first season premiered on the Discovery Channel on December 10, 2013. Season 2 premiered from October 7, 2014 and the third season premiered from August 11, 2015.
