= The Most (TV series) =

- Genre: Documentary
- Presented by: Mike Rowe
- Narrated by: Mike Rowe
- Country of origin: United States
- Original language: English
- No. of seasons: 5

Production
- Production company: Weller/Grossman Productions

Original release
- Network: History Channel
- Release: 2000 – 2004

The Most is a History Channel television series, hosted and narrated by Mike Rowe, and produced by Weller/Grossman Productions. The show covers many subjects and has a "Most Moment" at the end of every episode. The subjects of the series have to do with the "Most" of something. For example, the most isolated place in space (Mir), the most infamous symbol (swastika), or even the "most" largest island (Greenland). In addition, the stories are arranged into categories such as "close calls".

The Most details the "most" in history — the people, places, and events of the past that had significant impact when they occurred, and how they stood the test of time.

== Subjects ==
- The Bubonic Plague
- The Great London Fire
- The Cross
- Russia
- Sovereign Military Order of Malta
- The Atomic Bombing of Hiroshima
- The Great Depression
- Hoover ball
- The Chernobyl reactor meltdown
- Flying cars
- The Mir space station
- Olympus Mons
- The Norwegian rocket incident
- NORAD
- The Swastika

== Episodes ==
=== Season 1 ===
Structures built throughout history

1. Astounding Structures (3/13/00) - Temple devoted to rats; Congressional bomb shelter; weird house; largest pyramid
2. Extraordinary Nations and Places (3/14/00) - Mount Everest; the Mariana Trench; tallest waterfall; longest river; smallest country; coldest place
3. Incredible Disasters (3/15/00) - Volcanic eruptions; plagues; hurricanes; earthquakes; avalanches; meteors
4. Remarkable Battles (3/16/00) - Glorious moments and dark hours occur during war
5. Leaders; Mystery; Spies; Earth Shapers; Moon Landing (10/6/00)
6. Treasure; America's Deadliest; Creatures; Hoaxes; Tiananmen Square (11/3/00)
7. Criminal Duos; Treason; Proof Positive; Inventions; Lindbergh's Atlantic Crossing (11/17/00)
8. On the Move; U.S. Crime Fighters; Isolation; Spoils of War (12/1/00) - Ford's landmark vehicle
9. America Under Siege; Let the Games Begin; Behind Bars; The Sea (12/8/00) - Nikita Khrushchev
10. Speed; Destructive Innovations; Symbols; Subterranean (12/22/00) - The Space Shuttle Challenger explosion
11. Technological Catastrophes; Justice; Space Cars; Fortifications (1/5/01) - The fall of Saigon
12. Close Calls; Flights of Fancy; Give & Take; Water (1/12/01) - Iranian hostage crisis
13. Demolition; Oil; Nature Run Amok; Amusement (2/2/01) - Little Rock Nine
14. Earth-Shattering Events; Military Embarrassments; Working; Mammoth Monuments; Pearl Harbor (3/30/01)
15. Collisions; Windows Into the Past; On That Note; In the Mountains; Bastille (6/29/01) - The storming of the Bastille
16. Warships; Can't Take It With You; Animal Tales; Price of Freedom; Assassination of Archduke Ferdinand (7/16/01) - burial sites
17. Digging It; Light; Horse Sense; Did They ... Or Didn't They?; Science vs. Rome (8/6/01) - Rome tries Galileo
18. Survival; Fire; It's Mine, All Mine; Wind; Stock Market Crash of 1929 (8/20/01)
19. Wastelands; Rock Legends; Sea Stories; Temples; Sutter's Mill 1848 (9/3/01) - Gold is discovered at Sutter's Mill in 1848
20. Besieged; Heavy Metal; Family Business; Venues; Battles of Lexington & Concord (9/10/01) - Sieges; large trucks; theaters; American Revolution
21. Bailing Out; Rebellion; Building Blocks; Quixotic Quests (10/1/01) - Alexander Graham Bell first demonstrates electronic transmission of speech
22. Armor; Remarkable Relocations; Company Towns; Prisons (10/15/01)
23. Missiles; Precision; Food; Robots; Jackie Robinson (12/24/01)
24. Heists; Battlefield Innovations; Destruction; Home Sweet Home; Wright Brothers' First Flight (12/24/01)

=== Season 2 ===
Devastating events of the natural world

=== Season 4 ===
The most glorious moments and darkest hours of war

- ?, Unknown (4/12/04)
- ?, Unknown (4/19/04)
- ?, Unknown (4/26/04)
