= How Booze Built America =

- Starring: Mike Rowe
- Country of origin: United States
- No. of seasons: 1
- No. of episodes: 3

Production
- Executive producers: Craig Coffman; Emre Sahin; Jeanne Begley; Kelly McPherson; Mary Sullivan; Mike Rowe; Miriam Leffert; Sarah Wetherbee
- Production companies: Karga 7 mikeroweWORKS

Original release
- Network: Discovery Channel
- Release: September 19 – October 3, 2012

How Booze Built America is an American reality-documentary miniseries starring Mike Rowe. The miniseries premiered on the Discovery Channel on September 19, 2012. In each episode, Rowe travels around the United States discussing how alcoholic beverages affected periods throughout American history.

== Episodes ==
No.	Title	Original release date	U.S. viewers (millions)
1	"America's Revolution"	September 19, 2012	0.91
Mike Rowe discusses the Pilgrim's beer supply, the Boston Tea Party, and the battles of Lexington and Concord.
2	"Westward, Ho!"	September 26, 2012	0.94
Mike Rowe discusses alcohol's influence on westward expansion, including mountain men, Johnny Appleseed, and the OK Corral.
3	"To the Moon!"	October 3, 2012	0.62
Mike Rowe discusses how prohibition assisted codebreakers, NASCAR and the space race.
