= American Hot Rod =

American reality television series

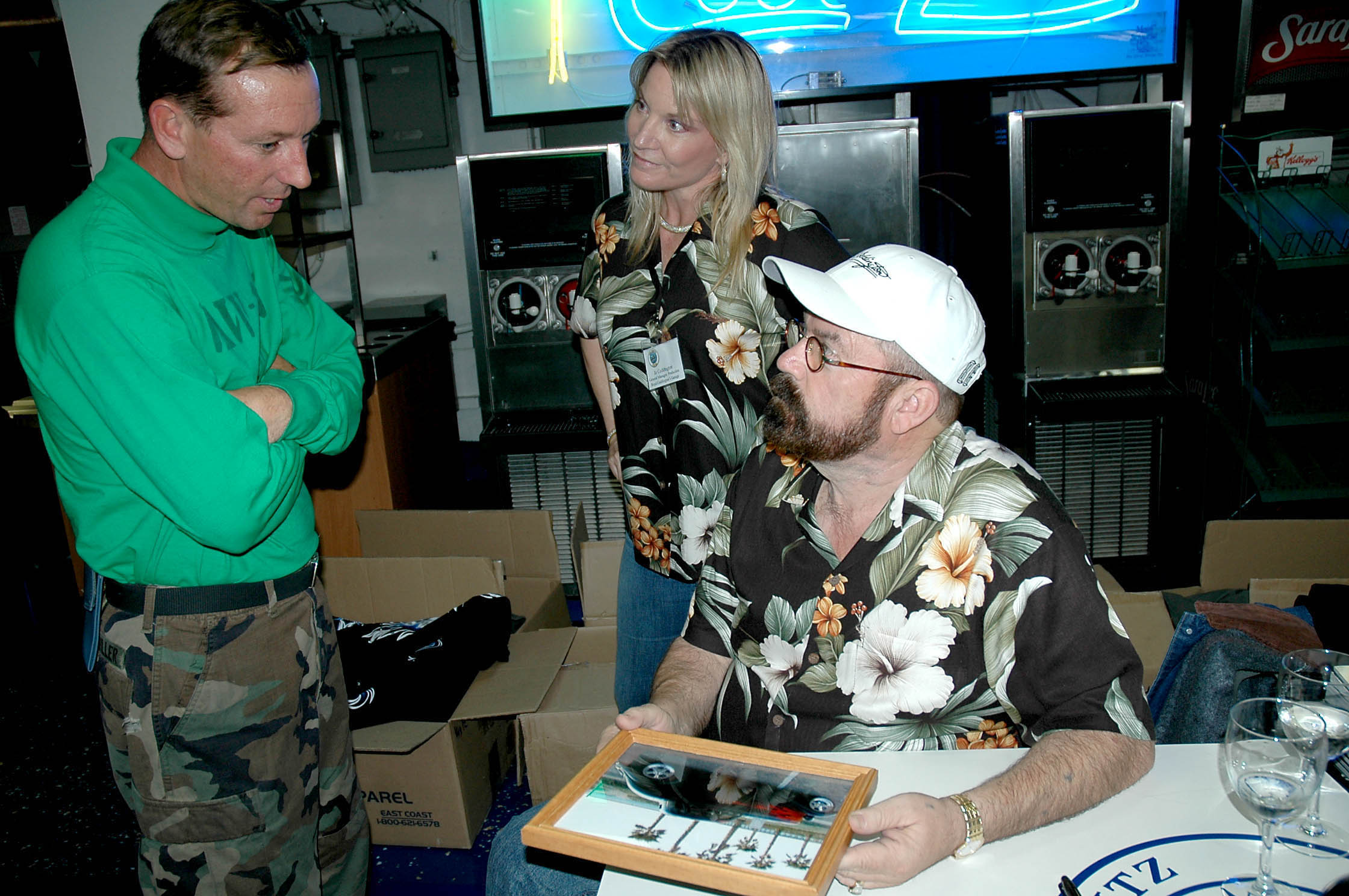
- Boyd Coddington (r) and his wife Jo sign autographs aboard the nuclear-powered aircraft carrier Nimitz in 2005
- Starring: Boyd Coddington
- Country of origin: United States
- Original language: English
- No. of seasons: 5
- No. of episodes: 76

Production
- Producer: Craig Piligian
- Production locations: La Habra, CA
- Running time: 60 minutes
- Production company: Pilgrim Films & Television

Original release
- Network: The Learning Channel, Discovery Channel
- Release: January 13, 2004 – September 27, 2007

American Hot Rod is a reality television series that originally aired between 2004 and 2007 on TLC and Discovery Channel. The series followed car designer Boyd Coddington and his crew as they built hot rods and custom vehicles at his wheel and car shop in La Habra, California. The show was known for its frequent rows and bust-ups, and a high staff turnover rate. Some crew members went to work for Overhaulin's Chip Foose, a former partner of Coddington's, for a more relaxed environment; even Coddington's own son could not work there for long.

The series ended when Coddington died, following complications from surgery, in February 2008. The car shop closed on June 20, 2008.

Custom cars built during the series included the "Alumatub", a '61 Impala Bubbletop, a '63 Chevy Corvette Stingray, and a '42 Woodie. In July 2007, the shop made an Elvis Tribute Car, a modified 1957 pink Cadillac, sponsored by Reese's.

== Hot rod shop ==
- Boyd Coddington: shop owner, died suddenly on February 27, 2008 at the age of 63 due to complications after surgery
- Jo Coddington: Boyd's wife, appeared in all five seasons, ran the collectable store, consignment store, all corporate builds
- Diane Coddington: Boyd's ex-wife, ran accounting dept., appeared in Seasons One through Four until offices were moved when wheel shop was sold to American Racing
- Chris Coddington: Boyd's son, custom wheel sales dept., appeared in all five seasons, wheel division sold to American Racing during S4 but he appeared on S05E02 (Hershey Tribute Car)
- Tom Emmons: art director, appeared only in S03E01 (Make-A-Wish Max Hemi) but did most of the in-house artwork and drawings for Boyd
- Duane Mayer: shop foreman, appeared in all five seasons, now runs his own shop.
- Dan "Chicago" Sobieski: appeared in all five seasons, opened his own shop.
- Lee Hayes: sheet metal man, appeared in Seasons Two through Five working part-time, debuted in S02E12 ('63 Stingray 2/3)
- Robert Taylor: fabricator & assembler, appeared in Seasons Four and Five, debuted in S04E14 ('36 Roadster)
- Chad "Bluebear" Geary: assembler, appeared in Seasons One and Two, fired during S02E06 (Rat Rod Build Off) for insubordination
- Jimmy Pett: fabricator and assembler, appeared in Seasons One through Three, gone by Season Four
- Chris Smith: fabricator and assembler, appeared in Seasons Four and Five
- Tommy Puriton: janitor, appeared in all five seasons
- Keith "Flanders" Hickson: freelance exhaust fabricator, appeared in Season One
- Rick Rempel: metal worker, appeared in one build in Season Four, debuted in S04E20 (El Camino/White Cap truck), quit during S04E21 to return to Canada
- Scott Parker: appeared in Seasons Two through Four, quit during S04E10 after staying to help complete the '61 Impala Bubbletop build
- Mike Curtis: machine shop supervisor, appeared in Seasons One and Two, fired during S02E22 ('59 Chevy Low Rider) for working for competitor Chip Foose on the side.
- Roy Schmidt: metal worker, appears in Seasons One through Three, died of lung cancer on Oct. 27th, 2005 at the age of 64 during filming of S04E03 ('54 Corvette & '55 Chevy)
- Thomas Loddby: mechanic, appeared in Seasons One through Five, left during S03E02 (Max Hemi) to start a shipping business, returned in S04E11 ('40 Ford) working on a part-time basis
- Al Simon: chassis builder, appears in Seasons One through Five, quits during S02E14 (Bud Light car), returns during S02E22 ('59 Chevy Low Rider), and leaves again during S05/E08 ('59 Corvette)
- "Speedy" MacDonald: apprentice, appeared in Seasons Four and Five before leaving during S05E06 (Sobe Mercury Wagon) to return to Connecticut
- Jon Rockwell: metal fabricator, appeared in Season Four, debuted in S04E12 ('40 Ford), gone when Season Five began
- Sean Dooley: metal worker, appeared in one build in Season Two ('65 Mustang), fired during S02E01 for insubordination
- Jimmy Hudson: metal fabricator, appeared in Season Four, debuted in S04E11 ('40 Ford), quit during S04E18 ('40 Ford Woodie) for personal reasons
- Brad Johnston: fabricator, appeared in Seasons Two through Four, debuted during S02E18 (Hildebrandt Car), quit during S04E09 ('61 Impala Bubbletop) after being confronted about excessive absenteeism
- Liz Miles: apprentice, appeared in Season Five, debuted in S05E07 ('59 Corvette), fired during S05E08 reportedly over an alleged salary dispute and conflict with Boyd's wife Jo
- Tony Piro: apprentice, appeared in Season Four, debuted S04E04, laid off S04E05, returned as an intern on S04E06 (all '56 Chevy), and eventually fired S04E19 ('40 Ford Woodie) for lack of experience
- Jon Mayo: machinist, appeared in Seasons One and Two, quit during S02E08 ('42 Woodie) to move to Hawaii
- Kevin Christianson: machinist, appeared in all five seasons
- Chris Campbell: driver, appeared in Seasons Two through Four, fired during S04E04 ('56 Chevy) for multiple accidents and mishaps
- Ben Vasquez: fabricator and assembler, appeared in Seasons Four and Five
- Ken Whitney: assembler/electrical, appeared in Seasons Two through Four, had his own business named Wire 1 Hotrod specializing in wiring and computers, called in on an as needed basis
- Jeffrey "Scott" Howard: fabricator and assembler, appeared in Seasons One and Two, gone by Season Three
- Jimy "Tig" Kraus: apprentice, appeared in Seasons One and Two, fired during S02E02 ('65 Mustang) for lack of experience and alleged careless work habits
- Trish ???: metal worker, appeared in a couple of builds in Season Two, fired during S02E08 ('42 Woodie) for missing a day and not calling in
- Louie Biegler: metal worker, appeared in one build during Season Four, debuted and quit during S04E04 ('56 Chevy) because he couldn't keep up with the workload
- Albert Gillikin, Jr: metal worker, appeared briefly in Season Four, debuted in S04E04 ('56 Chevy)
- Mike Bennett: metal worker, appeared in Season Four, debuted in S04E04 ('56 Chevy)
- Memo Sanchez: limo driver, appeared in multiple seasons, fired by Duane during S05E11 (Bonneville racer) because assignments from Boyd were interfering with parts runs
- Willie Johnstone: assembler, appeared briefly in Season Two ('59 Chevy Low Rider)
- Craig Jull: fabricator, appeared in Season Five, debuted on S05E10 to help out with the Bonneville Racer build
- Robert Gallegos: apprentice, appeared in Season Five, debuted in S05E02 (Hershey Tribute Car)
- Bryan "Barney" Cantrell: fabricator, appeared in Season One only
- Chris Hoskins: intern, appeared in Season Two, debuted in S02E02 ('65 Mustang), left during S02E08 ('42 Woodie) to return to school in Chicago
- Al "Skeeter" ???: mechanic, appeared in Season Two, debuted in S02E19 (Hildebrant Car)
- Kevin "Dog" Gotch: intern, appeared in Season Two, debuted in S02E08 ('42 Woodie)
- Andreas Andersson: intern, appeared in Season One, debuted in S01E05 (Alumatub), quit during S01E06 after verbal abuse from Duane caused him to leave and return to Sweden
- James Gallando: machinist, appears in Season One (Junkyard Dog)

== Body shop ==
- Justin Bergsto: body shop, appeared in Seasons Two through Five
- Rafael Garcia: body shop, appeared in Seasons One through Five
- Charley Hutton: painter & body shop supervisor, appeared in Seasons One and Two, quit during S02E10 ('42 Woodie) and opened his own shop Charley Hutton's Color Studio in Nampa, ID. He also appeared on Rides and Overhaulin', and wins a Ridler Award with Chip Foose.
- Andrew "Beetle Bailey" Petterson: body man, appeared in Seasons One and Two, left in Season Two to join Charley Hutton
- Greg Morrell: painter & body shop, appeared in Seasons Three through Five, debuted on S03E02 (Max Hemi)
- Bernt Karlsson: body shop, painter, appeared in Seasons Two through Five, debuted in S02E12 ('63 Stingray) as an independent contractor, then came aboard full-time on S02E15 (Bud Light Car).
- Brian ????: body shop apprentice, appeared in Seasons One and Two, gone when Season Three began
- Jose ????: body shop, appeared in Seasons Three through Five
- Paul Fortin: body shop, appeared in Seasons Three through Five, debuted on S03E02 (Max Hemi)
- Mike Rhodes: body shop, appeared briefly in Season Two, debuted in S3E13 for '63 Corvette build

== Episodes ==
=== Season 1 ===
No. overall	No. in season	Title	Original release date
1	1	"Junkyard Dog - Part 1"	January 13, 2004
On this episode of American Hot Rod, Boyd Coddington and his crew resurrect a classic '56 Chevy. Rescued from a rust-bucket graveyard, turning this junkyard dog into a high-end hot rod pushes tensions to breaking point and puts the Coddington crew's mettle to the test.
2	2	"Junkyard Dog - Part 2"	January 20, 2004
S01E02 - Pre-assembly and alignment of body panels and drivetrain components continues on the Junkyard Dog, Charlie makes a deal with body shop apprentice Brian to learn how to surf, Mike finishes the design and cuts the new custom aluminum wheels, Mike's gesture of creating a miniature wheel keychain for Boyd backfires, sanding on the body continues in preparation for priming and painting, a miscalculation in the exhaust routing results in having to reconfigure it. kty 8/30/20
3	3	"Junkyard Dog - Part 3"	February 6, 2004
S01E03 - Final preparation for paint and chassis mock-up continues on the Junkyard Dog, Diane lectures Mike about procedural issues, the team celebrates Tommy's birthday with a party at Boyd's house, Charlie pushes the car through the primer stage to buy more time for drive-train mock-up and modifies the body trim, Duane and Scott Howard begin to run cables and fuel lines, body is broken down for final paint, final assembly on chassis and drivetrain begins, a machining issue arises with matching the engine and transmission, Charlie learns his father's health has taken a turn for the worse and pulls an all-nighter to get as much of the paint work done as he can before leaving town.
4	4	"Junkyard Dog - Part 4"	February 13, 2004
The paintwork is finished, the body is remounted, and the car is off to Gabe's to have the interior done. Gabe's pulls out all the stops and finishes the car early. The car gets back to Boyd's for the final touches and Charley arrives back, following the death of his father. With Charley back, the car is done on time for unveiling.
5	5	"Alumatub - Part 1"	February 27, 2004
S01E05 - The second project of the season features an all aluminum, hand-made roadster dubbed the Alumatub, project gets off to a rough start after Mike and Bluebear crack one of the aluminum frame rails and Duane must get involved, tensions heat up between Bluebear and Jimmy ultimately resulting in Boyd staging a mock boxing match, final design decisions are made, Bluebear is pulled off the project and replaced by Jimmy, Mike begins designing and cutting suspension and drivetrain components, new intern Andreas arrives but is not much help due to his inability to speak much English, fabrication and assembly of the frame continues and Bluebear continues to act like a clown every time he sees a camera running. kty 9/1/20
6	6	"Alumatub - Part 2"	March 5, 2004
S01E06 - New intern Andreas quits as a result Duane's verbal abuse and returns to Sweden, Kevin encounters problems cutting the wheels on the CNC machine, Mike gets the car into rolling chassis form, car is sent off to Marcel's Custom Metal to have custom body hand-fabricated, clearance issues must be resolved with transmission components, tensions increase at Marcel's as they push to meet the deadline, and Boyd drops in to offer some last-minute design suggestions. kty 9/2/20
7	7	"Alumatub - Part 3"	March 12, 2004
S01E07 - Work continues at Marcel's Custom Metal on hand-fabricating body panels and doors, Mike designs custom aluminum hood hinges, Kevin once again runs into problems cutting parts on the CNC machine, Mike and Barney rush over to Marcel's to mount the electric water pump, Diane throws up roadblocks for Duane ordering necessary parts, Boyd, Duane and Charlie pay Marcel's a visit to check on progress of the body, Mike begins polishing and assembly of the engine, Marcel's begins fabrication on the final body panel, which is a custom roof designed to duplicate the look of a convertible top, Boyd drops in to give his final approval, the car body returns to Boyd Coddington Garage so they can begin mounting components, Bluebear continues with his shenanigans and sets Duane off, much to his chagrin Roy gets dragged into helping with the project, Flanders is called in to fabricate the headers and work with Barney on fabricating the custom exhaust system, Duane gets upset upon discovering problems with the positioning of the header tubes, and concerns arise over not having the correct parts on hand during mock-up. kty 9/2/20
8	8	"Alumatub - Part 4"	March 19, 2004
S01E08 - With the Alumatub project is now weeks behind schedule Boyd calls a meeting to discuss a game plan going forward, Roy begins fabrication of custom inner door panels, and because of a mis-communication must do them twice, Diane decides to shut down the whole shop in order to hold a meeting regarding purchase orders, Mike breaks an insert tool on the CNC machine while cutting the gas cap assembly and robs an insert from the wheel shop, the gas cap is completed and installed, Boyd decides to pull the funnel trick with Jimmy being the victim, Mike and Roy begin fabrication on the belly pan and Mike ends up doing most of the work, engine block is sent out to Mike Dighera of Mike's Speed and Machine to be machined and assembled, Mike and Andrew organize a trip to Bear Mountain with some of the crew to teach them how to snowboard and Mike injures his left knee in a bad fall, Boyd and Duane become worried that Mike's injury may affect the timeline of the project, the body shop begins metal finishing of body panels, and the hot rod shop begins basic fabrication work. kty 9/2/20
9	9	"Alumatub - Part 5"	March 26, 2004
The Coddington crew has two weeks to finish this historic one-of-a-kind hot rod, but has blown their lead time and may have now blown the engine.
10	10	"32 Hi-Boy Roadster - Part 1"	May 14, 2004
This is the first episode in the new project for the '32 hi-boy roadster. Boyd has to get the old car and then figure how he will make it morph into the hot rod of his dreams. The twist is that those old classics were not meant for today's technology. Boyd must make them fit.
11	11	"32 Hi-Boy Roadster - Part 2"	May 21, 2004
The '32 roadster hits against a deadline, the crew is short on parts, the shop supervisor is furious, and Boyd Coddington wants to change things in midbuild.
12	12	"32 Hi-Boy Roadster - Part 3"	June 4, 2004
Falling dangerously behind on the prize '32 roadster, the Coddington crew is forced to make radical moves in their bid to bring their beast under control. As the deadline fast approaches, the two Coddington shops find themselves fighting over the roadster and control of the car's destiny.
13	13	"32 Hi-Boy Roadster - Part 4"	June 11, 2004
With only two days left to assemble the entire '32 roadster, Boyd's team bears down to fight its way to the finish line, but when Mike refuses to work over the weekend and a boxful of crucial parts fails to come back from the chrome plater, Boyd faces the possibility of heading to his hot-rod event with nothing to show.

=== Season 2 ===
No. overall	No. in season	Title	Original release date
14	1	"'65 Mustang - Part 1"	October 1, 2004
Boyd's next mission starts with the unlikely discovery of a '65 Ford Mustang in an old barn, but as the team begins to tear apart this ailing American classic, full of holes and rusted metal parts, they discover they must complete the rebuild in a record seven weeks. Then, just as the crew is getting started, a feud emerges between Bluebear and a newcomer that turns into all-out warfare in the hot-rod shop. With morale plummeting, Boyd and Duane decide enough is enough and one of the crew is fired ... a change nobody saw coming.
15	2	"'65 Mustang - Part 2"	October 8, 2004
The Coddington team find themselves knee-deep in controversy over the '65 Mustang. With the shop tearing itself apart, Boyd decides to use a little positive reinforcement to boost morale by taking some of his hardworking crew to judge a different kind of contest. When the same old problems return, Boyd introduces the crew to his own version of positive reinforcement: a military boot camp to get everyone into shape. Then, as the Mustang nears a crucial deadline, Charley realizes that he ilow on a crucial element. Will Boyd let Charley take the heat for all the delays, or will he send another shop member to the firing squad?
16	3	"'65 Mustang - Part 3"	October 15, 2004
With only seven days left to finish the '65 Mustang, Duane cracks under the pressure with fewer crew members to complete the job and key parts still missing. Just when Boyd's crew reaches their deadline in time for the car to head to upholstery, Charley is put to the test again when the engine's paint job cracks, leaving him to pull another all-nighter for his team. Will this American beauty reach the finish line after its most severe crisis yet? The Mustang project must come to an end — whether or not the car is completed in time for the surprise reveal at Indy.
17	4	"Rat Rod Build Off - Part 1"	October 26, 2004
After months of disagreements over what constitutes a classic hot rod, Boyd puts Bluebear's "theories" to the test and challenges him to a build-off — one that will end with a race from L.A. to Louisville, Kentucky. The chance to be in charge quickly goes to Bluebear's head, and he refuses to heed Boyd's advice, even on important safety issues.
18	5	"Rat Rod Build Off - Part 2"	December 3, 2004
The tension between Boyd and Bluebear rises to a dangerous level as the young, headstrong builder goes against the master's orders. As the crisis grows, Bluebear begins to alienate members of his own team, and the entire competition threatens to unravel.
19	6	"Rat Rod Build Off - Part 3"	December 10, 2004
As the build-off between Boyd and Bluebear grows more tense, Boyd desperately tries to lighten the mood, but his attempts fall by the wayside as Bluebear's stiff resistance to Boyd's suggestions only hardens Boyd's resolve that the issue must come to a head. In a shocking confrontation, the two men lay it all out on the table. As emotions reach a fever pitch, Bluebear's future in the shop is finally determined.
20	7	"Rat Rod Build Off - Part 4"	December 17, 2004
With the build-off finally over, the race across the country will determine the winning hot rod. Through desert, forest, and mountains, the teams race their cars, while facing every possible tragedy and triumph. Finally, a winner is crowned, but a huge surprise awaits at the finish line in Kentucky.
21	8	"'42 Woodie - Part 1"	January 7, 2005
To boost morale, Boyd brings in a fun new project: a classic '42 Woodie. However, no one else in the shop seems excited by the build, especially when they find out they have less than eight weeks to complete the project before its debut at a car show in Hawaii. With a tight schedule and a less-than-teamwork attitude in the shop, this build might not make it out of the starting blocks.
22	9	"'42 Woodie - Part 2"	January 14, 2005
With a lot of work to do, and little time to do it, Duane's stress reaches the boiling point, leading Boyd to suggest he take a vacation while the car is being upholstered. Meanwhile, Charley confides to Beetle Bailey that he is considering a job offer from another shop. The tension can be cut with a knife as the Woodie finally heads into the body shop.
23	10	"'42 Woodie - Part 3"	January 21, 2005
To meet the Woodie's deadline, everyone pitches in, despite several hotheaded stand-offs. At the last second, when the guys try to start the car, they discover a major leak, which takes hours to correct. In the end, the car makes it to its unveiling in Hawaii and is a huge success; however, Boyd and Charley remain at odds, and after a very emotional showdown, Charley quits to take a job with a rival shop. What will Boyd do without his heavy hitter?
24	11	"'63 Chevy Sting Ray Corvette - Part 1"	February 4, 2005
Still reeling from Charley's departure, the crew embarks its next endeavor: a '63 Corvette. What sounds like a dream project turns into a nightmare when the owner requests that the 1,500-horsepower Corvette be a race car, show car, and street car all in one; as a result, Mike and the guys quickly lose interest in the difficult project. With Duane pulling double duty to fill in for Charley in the body shop, Scott is put in charge, and the search for Charley's replacement is on.
25	12	"'63 Chevy Sting Ray Corvette - Part 2"	February 11, 2005
As the shop struggles to turn the car into both a race car and a hot rod before the rapidly approaching deadline, Boyd asks everyone to work extra hours ... including semiretired Roy, and the ever-grumpy Roy faces the biggest challenge: dealing with his new (and very talkative) assistant. Faced with the unfamiliar demands of building a race car, and unforeseen complications at every turn, the team falls way behind on the Corvette.
26	13	"'63 Chevy Sting Ray Corvette - Part 3"	February 18, 2005
With only two weeks to go before the '63 Corvette's debut, Boyd faces a mutiny when some of his best guys walk out for an overdue day off. Meanwhile, a mystery painter steps into the booth to paint the car in Charley's absence, but with so little time before the deadline hits, the team must pull together and work around the clock to get the car completed. Boyd stalls the crowd until the car is finished, and when the Sting Ray finally rolls out in front of the anxious spectators, it is a huge success for Boyd and his loyal team.
27	14	"Bud Light Car - Part 1"	April 1, 2005
The Coddington crew travels to St. Louis, Missouri, to visit the Anheuser-Busch headquarters in preparation for their newest hot rod. Bud Light challenges Boyd, choosing the hard-to-find '33 roadster for their build. Unable to find anything but a '36 coupe, the gang is forced to turn it into a roadster, a big metalwork job that falls on the semiretired Roy and his assistant Lee.To make matters worse, Al drops the bombshell that he is leaving Boyd Coddington's shop.
28	15	"Bud Light Car - Part 2"	April 8, 2005
Master car builder and mentor Al resigns from the shop, and leaves Boyd and Duane with one less pair of hands to tackle the difficult challenge of turning a '36 coupe into a roadster. With no one in the body shop and a car that is going to require a lot of body work, Duane is forced to find some outside help. As the shop falls further and further behind, Duane's frustration increases, and Boyd and Thomas butt heads over the workday hours.
29	16	"Bud Light Car - Part 3"	April 15, 2005
The garage's new guy, Bernt, feels the pressure as time runs out to finish the hot rod for Bud Light. Tensions run high as everyone scrambles to meet the deadline.
30	17	"Hildebrandt Car - Part 1"	May 20, 2005
Vern Hildebrandt brings his dad's '34 roadster into Boyd's shop to be restored to the condition it was in back in 1956. The crew is challenged, as they must find parts ranging from 1934 to 1956 to use on the car.
31	18	"Hildebrandt Car - Part 2"	May 27, 2005
Boyd and Mike's creative differences on style and paint — Mike prefers to preserve the roadster's authentic style, while Boyd wants to update the look — generate tension as Boyd undermines Mike's authority during the restoration.
32	19	"Hildebrandt Car - Part 3"	June 3, 2005
As the NHRA opening looms, Boyd and the crew get off track with the completion of Vern Hildebrandt's '34 roadster when the engine builders have a difficult time finding the old parts to finish their work.
33	20	"'59 Chevy Low Rider - Part 1"	July 8, 2005
Boyd and the crew take on the challenge of rebuilding a 1959 Impala two-door coupe — nicknamed "Ghetto Princess" — and turning it into a classic lowrider with an extra-low stance, wide wheels, and a Chevy big block.
34	21	"'59 Chevy Low Rider - Part 2"	July 15, 2005
The garage continues to add speedster style to the Impala and to build a matching one-off motorcycle also requested by the client.
35	22	"'59 Chevy Low Rider - Part 3"	July 22, 2005
The pressure to finish the 1959 Impala and matching motorcycle intensifies.
36	23	"'59 Chevy Low Rider - Part 4"	July 29, 2005
The builds finally complete, Boyd unveils the new masterpieces at Camp Pendleton in Southern California to boost morale among Marines being deployed to Iraq.

=== Season 3 ===
No. overall	No. in season	Title	Original release date
37	1	"Make-A-Wish Car - Part 1"	October 3, 2005
The Coddingtton Foundation takes on its first project: a ’63 Dodge Polara. In this very special episode Max Cohen, a 17-year-old leukemia patient will help with the build.
38	2	"Make-A-Wish Car - Part 2"	October 10, 2005
Work continues on the "Max Hemi."
39	3	"Make-A-Wish Car - Part 3"	October 17, 2005
Work is completed on the ’63 Dodge Polara. Boyd and the guys unveil the car at the Make-A-Wish Foundation in Thousand Oaks, California.

=== Season 4 ===
No. overall	No. in season	Title	Original release date
40	1	"'54 Corvette & '55 Chevy - Part 1"	March 13, 2006
Another SEMA build is underway and the tension is still thick in the shop. Who will get mad and walk out?
41	2	"'54 Corvette & '55 Chevy - Part 2"	March 20, 2006
The shop is short staffed and the ones who are left are making costly mistakes. Will the builds be completed or will replacing the crew be the next priority?
42	3	"'54 Corvette & '55 Chevy - Part 3"	March 27, 2006
With the SEMA show deadline upon them, tension mounts as they race to complete three projects.
43	4	"'56 Chevy Convertible - Part 1"	April 3, 2006
The latest project for Boyd and the Coddington crew is to add a new twist to a '56 Chevy convertible. With a shrinking staff, Boyd is forced to hire some new guys to help out with the build. When the new team members add more problems than anything else, though, the usual crew has to pick up the slack before this hot rod build stalls out.
44	5	"'56 Chevy Convertible - Part 2"	April 10, 2006
The guys continue working on their latest build, a '56 Chevy convertible. Having lost some of the recent hires in the shop, Mike steps up to work on the taillights and has some trouble adjusting to working side by side with Lee. A new crew member has a hard time fitting in at the shop and is let go, and when Duane heads to Nashville for some drag racing, things fall behind in the shop and the build gets off course.
45	6	"'56 Chevy Convertible - Part 3"	April 17, 2006
Running out of time to finish their latest build, a '56 Chevy convertible, the guys in the body shop are forced to work over the holidays. Duane and Boyd decide to give Tony another chance, and bring him back to the shop as an unpaid intern. As the team works together to finish the car, Scott's frustration hits an all-time high. The car is revealed at Autorama in Sacramento, Calif.
46	7	"'61 Impala Bubbletop - Part 1"	May 1, 2006
Boyd and the Coddington crew get to work on their latest project — a 1961 Chevy Impala Bubbletop. While the car is being taken apart, Lee finds himself a new partner in crime in Tony. The two of them add some spice to the shop and cook up some chili for the crew. Scott and Chris take a trip to Mexico and decide to build a truck as a side project, but when it adds more work for crew, Duane's temper boils over.
47	8	"'61 Impala Bubbletop - Part 2"	May 8, 2006
The guys continue working on their latest project, a '61 Chevy Impala Bubbletop, but they get behind schedule when they run into some problems. Boyd and Jo head to Denver to pick out the paint scheme with the car's owner. The mood in the shop turns sour as the deadline approaches. Scott's unhappiness with the shop continues to grow, and that is reinforced when Boyd returns and does not like some of the work that he did. Tony makes improvements as he spends time learning from the more experienced crew.
48	9	"'61 Impala Bubbletop - Part 3"	May 15, 2006
With the '61 Chevy Impala Bubbletop way behind schedule, the body shop works overtime to try to get it back on track. Frustration builds in the shop when Brad does not show up for work, leading to an explosive confrontation. When Tony gets into a serious car accident, the shop is down another guy, leaving more work for everyone else. Tired of the tight deadlines, Scott decides that it is finally his time to say goodbye to Boyd and the Coddington crew.
49	10	"'61 Impala Bubbletop - Part 4"	May 22, 2006
With the deadline quickly approaching for the '61 Chevy Impala Bubbletop, the Coddington crew kicks it into high gear. When Boyd questions the paint job, a crew member grows frustrated and threatens to walk out. Once the car is in final assembly, Scott packs up and says goodbye to the hot rod shop. When the wheel shop closes its doors, Diane has a hard time leaving it all behind.
50	11	"'40 Ford - Part 1"	July 10, 2006
Boyd and Jo head to Sacramento to pick up their next build: a 1940 Ford. Asked to turn this beauty into a hot rod for John Sullivan's birthday present, Boyd learns of the tight deadline that they will be up against. Once back in the shop, Tony and Lee work on taking the car apart. The Coddington crew soon realizes that this car needs more work than expected, cutting into their already tight schedule. Boyd hires a new metal fabricator, Jimmy Hudson, in an attempt to finally replace Roy, hoping this will help keep the guys on track. Tony pitches in, but ends up being more of a liability than a help to the guys.
51	12	"'40 Ford - Part 2"	July 17, 2006
The Coddington crew continues working on their latest build, a 1940 Ford. Already behind schedule, the guys slip even further behind. With Tony making more and more mistakes in the shop, he is transferred to the CNC shop, in hopes of finding his niche. Duane and Bernt go on vacation, leaving Dan in charge, but when Dan and the body shop guys butt heads, the car gets even more off course. Duane returns to the shop, and tempers flare when he finds out that the car still is not done.
52	13	"'40 Ford - Part 3"	July 24, 2006
Boyd and the guys race to finish their latest build, a 1940 Ford, on time. Duane is upset that they have gotten so far behind schedule. Fortunately, the Coddington crew pulls it together and finishes in time to reveal the car in Sacramento.
53	14	"'36 Roadster - Part 1"	October 2, 2006
Work starts on the '36 Ford, but typical last-minute changes threaten the project. One member of the team is so frustrated that he storms out.
54	15	"'36 Roadster - Part 2"	October 9, 2006
Work continues on the Ford, and staying on schedule is harder than expected. A small side job is taking up too much time.
55	16	"'36 Roadster - Part 3"	October 16, 2006
The first annual Boyd Coddington collector-car auction is getting close and the team races to complete three cars.
56	17	"'40 Ford Woodie - Part 1"	November 20, 2006
The crew is working on a 1940 Ford Woodie that is headed for Mississippi for a Hurricane Katrina event.
57	18	"'40 Ford Woodie - Part 2"	November 27, 2006
The crew continues to work on the 1940 Woodie, but they struggle to keep it together. With a deadline looming, will the pressure be too much?
58	19	"'40 Ford Woodie - Part 3"	December 4, 2006
The deadline is upon the broken team. They rush to finish the project before time runs out.
59	20	"'31 Truck - Part 1"	February 15, 2007
The team starts their latest project - a ‘69 El Camino that the owner wants to use to carry his Harley. At the same time, Boyd is asked to take on another project by a construction company that wants a unique promotional tool - a '31 Model A truck.
60	21	"'31 Truck - Part 2"	February 22, 2007
After some minor setbacks, the team refocuses and hits the double build head on. Bets are made, anger erupts, and hood does not fit.
61	22	"'31 Truck - Part 3"	March 1, 2007
Work is continuing on the El Camino and the Model A, but further setbacks put both builds in jeopardy. A ‘Boyd’ extra stops by that leaves the team seeing double.
62	23	"'57 Chevy - Part 1"	March 8, 2007
S04E23 - Boyd is commissioned to build a '57 Chevy in celebration the 50th anniversary of both the '57 Chevy and O'Reilly Auto Parts, Ben and Johnny oversee disassembly of the car, body is removed and set to Strip Clean Co. to be chemically stripped and power washed, Bernt is put in charge of the sheet metal, a new chassis from Art Morrison arrives, Boyd is invited to be a special guest at an auto show in Regina, Canada, body comes back from stripper and is mounted to new the chassis, Bernt begins to remove old quarter panels despite several others questioning his methods, Ben and Johnny begin metal fabrication on doors and dash, Dan continues to stir the pot by questioning Bernt's methods, Duane begins to get the three cars ready for the Good Guys show in Scottsdale, AZ, Lee is assigned the unenviable task of cleaning out the Water Jet machine, Robert performs metal fabrication to fill in where the hood bullets used to be, Bernt gets involved, cutting out much of the hood support structure and where the hood latch is supposed to mount and Boyd, Jo, Duane, Dan and Tommy hit the road for Scottsdale. kty 9/2/20
63	24	"'57 Chevy - Part 2"	March 15, 2007
The '57 Chevy build goes smoothly, so Boyd and the guys travel to an auto show in Arizona. Meanwhile, back at the shop, one crew member decides to mix things up, creating chaos.
64	25	"'57 Chevy - Part 3"	March 22, 2007
The body shop races to finish the paint on the '57 Chevy, and Boyd brings a little Christmas cheer by giving the guys a day at the drag strip.

=== Season 5 ===
No. overall	No. in season	Title	Original release date
65	1	"Hershey Tribute Car - Part 1"	July 12, 2007
Boyd visits Hershey to get a brief on a car they want built - as a tribute to Elvis Presley. Boyd and Jo tour the factory to meet the people, then head off to Graceland to get some ideas for the car. The final choice is a '57 Cadillac, and Boyd gets to work.
66	2	"Hershey Tribute Car - Part 2"	July 19, 2007
Work continues on the Elvis tribute car. Duane does not like the color and tries to get Boyd to change his mind. Boyd and Duane take a pink dare. Jo and Robert visit the USAF Thunderbirds and get to go up in the air for a spin.
67	3	"Hershey Tribute Car - Part 3"	July 26, 2007
The Elvis car starts coming together and to everyone's surprise, the color looks really good. Chris does not like the wheels, though, but Boyd will not change his mind. Gabe is pleased to be working with white leather for a change. The car is unveiled at the Reese's store in New York City.
68	4	"Sobe Mercury Wagon - Part 1"	August 2, 2007
Sobe ask Boyd to build a promotional hot rod based on a 1960 Mercury wagon. Meanwhile, the construction company is back with a special build - a wheelbarrow - in time for a convention.
69	5	"Sobe Mercury Wagon - Part 2"	August 9, 2007
Work on the Mercury continues, but is going very slowly as everyone is waiting for things to happen.
70	6	"Sobe Mercury Wagon - Part 3"	August 16, 2007
As the deadline looms, the stress starts to affect Dwayne and the countdown clock is not helping. Everything starts coming together and the car gets into shape, including some custom surfboards. With the car complete, Boyd heads off to unveil the car at a surf event in Florida.
71	7	"'59 Corvette - Part 1"	August 23, 2007
Boyd's team starts work on a double build - a 1959 Corvette and a custom Delahaye. The team has a new female member; will the guys accept her?
72	8	"'59 Corvette - Part 2"	August 30, 2007
Work continues on the two builds, while finishing up a third for good measure. Duane's management style starts to take its toll and morale sinks to a new low. Al quits and Liz leaves as Jo and she do not get along. What is happening to the crew?
73	9	"'59 Corvette - Part 3"	September 6, 2007
Boyd takes some time out to make a trip to Tulsa, to watch a 1957 Plymouth Belvedere being removed from a time capsule. Will they be able to make her run? The team finishes work on the Corvette ahead of its debut... in a drag race against a modified Corvette Z06.
74	10	"Bonneville Racer - Part 1"	September 13, 2007
Boyd's newest project is a Model T that he plans to turn into a racer for Jo to drive at Bonneville. To get the Delahaye back on track, he enlists the help of one of his customers.
75	11	"Bonneville Racer - Part 2"	September 20, 2007
Work continues on Jo's Bonneville racer and Boyd opts to put Rocky's car on hold. Duane's temper annoys everyone and there are problems with the engine.
76	12	"Bonneville Racer - Part 3"	September 27, 2007
The team finishes Jo's car and heads off to Bonneville. Before she can attempt the 200-mph record, Jo must first earn her licenses in a car she has not driven before.

== See also ==
- American Chopper
- Monster Garage
- Overhaulin'
- Pimp My Ride
- Trick My Truck
