= Unique Whips =

Unique Whips is an American reality television show that aired on the now-defunct Speed network from 2005 to 2008. It premiered on February 8, 2005, the show follows the work of Unique Autosports, based in Long Island, New York, as they customize celebrity automobiles. It was created and Produced by Steve Hillebrand and Corey Damsker of Hollywood East. The customization generally consists of car stereo, wheels, custom paint and interior work. Celebrities whose cars were featured on the show include P. Diddy, DJ Pauly D, Jeff Gordon, Tony Stewart, Pam Anderson, Patti LaBelle, 50 Cent, LeBron James, Carmelo Anthony, Marcus Camby, Fat Joe, and Tom Wolfe.

== Spin-offs and related works ==
Unique Autosports: Miami ran on the Spike network for one season.

On 2 February 2016, a sequel television series featuring Unique Autosports, Unique Rides, premiered on Discovery's Velocity (now Motor Trend) channel. The first episode featured Castro modifying a Cadillac Escalade for Jason Derulo. The series ran for three seasons.

Another spin-off called Unique Academy USA premiered in July 2025 on Roku.

== Celebrity rides ==
- P. Diddy - 2 Jeep Wrangler Unlimited
- B-Real – 2007 Nissan Pathfinder, 2007 Nissan Armada
- Pharrell Williams - 1998 Nissan Maxima, 1993 Toyota Supra, 1994 BMW 3 Series 1988 Hyundai Excel Sedan
- LeBron James - 2003 Hummer H2, Ferrari F430
- Orlando Brown - 1996 Chevrolet Impala SS, 2007 Ford F-650
- 50 Cent - 2007 Lamborghini Murcielago Roadster, 2006 Rolls-Royce Phantom, 2005 Chrysler 300C, 2008 Pontiac G8
- Chi-Ali - 2004 Nissan Altima, 2009 Chevrolet Impala, 1995 Ford Mustang Coupe, 2003 Hummer H2, 2000 Toyota Camry, 1997 Ford F-150 Harley Davidson Edition
- Lloyd Banks - 1972 Chevrolet Impala, 2006 Bentley Continental, Bulletproof SUV, 2003 Hummer H2
- KRS-One - Chevrolet Monte Carlo Stock Car
- Jadakiss - 2004 Range Rover, 2005 Chevrolet Corvette, 2004 Mercedes-Benz S-Class, 2005 Cadillac XLR, GMC Yukon Denali, 2003 Cadillac Escalade, 1997 Chevrolet Tahoe
- Fat Joe - 2005 Bentley Continental
- Dewayne Robertson - Dodge Charger SRT8, Land Rover Range Rover, Cadillac Escalade, Hummer H2
- Al Harrington - 2007 Cadillac Escalade, Bentley Continental GT
- Busta Rhymes - Rolls-Royce Phantom, 1997 Ford F-150 Harley Davidson Edition, Lamborghini Diablo, 1988 Chevrolet Caprice
- Queen Latifah - Lamborghini Murcielago, 1984 Cadillac Hearse, 1973 Chevrolet Impala Convertible
- Mike McGlone - 2006 Chevrolet Impala, 1995 Cadillac Fleetwood
- Carmelo Anthony - Lincoln Continental
- Timbaland - 2002 Porsche Cayenne
- Charles Barkley - Ferrari 458 Spider, Jaguar XJ220, Hummer H1, Aston Martin Vanquish, Lamborghini Gallardo
- Tony Yayo - 2003 Hummer H2, Mercedes-Benz CLS-Class
- Young Buck - 2003 BMW 760li
- The Game - 2003 Cadillac Escalade
- Jerricho Cotchery - Bentley Continental Flying Spur
- Gary Sheffield - Cadillac Escalade
- Marcus Camby - Hummer H2, Corvette
- Marcus Banks - Land Rover Range Rover, BMW 745i
- Byron Leftwich - 1967 Lincoln Continental Convertible
- Jason Giambi - Cadillac Escalade
- Nelly - Bentley Continental GT
- Ruben Sierra - Ford F-150 Harley Davidson Edition truck
- GZA - Dodge Magnum
- Patti LaBelle - Mercedes Benz CLS 55
- Barry Gardner - Mercedes Benz CLS 55
- Wyclef Jean - 1994 BMW 5-Series, 1988 Chevrolet Caprice Sedan, 1992 Honda Civic Sedan
- Jennifer Capriati - 2005 Range Rover
- Robinson Cano - Cadillac Escalade
- Andruw Jones - Aston-Martin, Buick Electra 225
- Livan Hernandez - Ferrari F430
- Bernard Hopkins - Bentley Continental GT Convertible
- Brad Miller - 2005 Ford Excursion
- RZA - 2005 Chevy Trailblazer
- Jazze Pha - 1998 Land Rover Range Rover, 2014 Chevrolet Tahoe, 2003 Dodge Durango, 2016 Dodge Charger
- Jason Derulo - 2016 Cadillac Escalade
