= King of Cars =

- The King of Cars logo
- Starring: Josh Towbin; Will Tooros; Prem Singh; Mark Deeter
- Country of origin: United States
- Original language: English
- No. of seasons: 2
- No. of episodes: 26

Production
- Running time: 30 minutes

Original release
- Network: A&E Network
- Release: April 4, 2006 – March 26, 2007

King of Cars is an American reality television series that aired in over 21 countries, centering on the Towbin Dodge car dealership, in Henderson, Nevada, south of Las Vegas, Nevada. Managed by Josh Towbin a.k.a. "Chop" a.k.a. the King of Cars, famous for the cult hit infomercial, "The Chopper Show", in which his salesmen dress up as various characters, as he "chops" the prices of his cars.

It was recorded on video in HDTV Widescreen Letterbox Format.

== Characters ==
Many of the salesman are referred to by their nicknames from the informercial "The Chopper Show".

=== Josh "Chop" Towbin ===
Towbin Dodge was named the #1 Dodge Dealer in the World for multiple years, including 2023 and 2025. Towbin Dodge Ram is part of the Towbin Auto Group, which is solely owned and operated by Josh "Chop" Towbin. Towbin Auto Group also consists of Towbin Alfa Romeo Fiat, which has been the #1 Alfa Romeo and Fiat dealer in the West Business Center for many years. Towbin Fiat was most recently the #1 Fiat store in the Nation in 2022. Towbin Kia is the last part of the Towbin Auto Group and is the #1 Kia Dealer in the state for the 7th consecutive year and is a multi year winner of the Kia President's Award and is again for 2025.

Chop also owns several other businesses including Towbin Jewelry, which is a wholesaler of entry-level, high-end jewelry, and custom pendants by Richard Beal, Rolex and more. Chop is also the President of ISA Boxing and is the sports agent and talent manager representing many pro athletes, including Muhammad Ali's grandson, Nico Ali Walsh, and stand out fighter Shane Mosley Jr., who holds the WBA Continental Americas belt.

Chop is a National Dealer Council Member for all the brands he sells, including for Dodge, Ram, Alfa Romeo, Fiat and Kia. This is an accomplishment few in the automotive industry have held. He is also on several other boards, including the Stellantis Financial Dealer Council and the Southern Nevada Franchise Auto Dealers Board.

Chop has partnerships and does business with over 200 celebrities including Floyd Mayweather, who he has sold over 150 cars to. Even if a guest is not a celebrity, Chop has a VIP concierge service to help customers find and buy vehicles. This concierge service serves high net worth individuals seeking vehicles from luxury car brands such as Maybach or Buggatti.

Chop supports several local charities in Southern Nevada, including the Nevada SPCA, 3 Square, The Salvation Army, Boys & Girls Club, Cesar Chavez Community Center and many more.

In his earlier years, Chop was a Radio host on Hot 97.5 and Saturday Night Street Jam DJ.

Chop founded Chopper's Street Fuego and has appeared on many TV shows.

Chop is a major social media influencer and has the Instagram handle @chop.

=== Mark Deeter (a.k.a. Deeter) ===
Started off as a salesman then was promoted to Sales Team Leader and was just recently promoted to the Sales Tower. Deeter loves his hair and wrestled Man-Hole in baby oil.

=== Bobby Hood (a.k.a. the Auto Marshall) ===
The Auto Marshall dresses in Western attire—boots, spurs, tight-pants, and a hat. His real name is Bobby Hood. He sold cars in Amarillo Texas and previously worked for Papa John's Pizza.

== Episodes ==
=== Season one ===
1. Lost pilot (actually from A&E series "Take This Job")
2. "We Dooz It Large"
3. "Showgirl Showdown"
4. "Blue Day"
5. "Fresh Meat"
6. "King for a Day"
7. "Leader of the Pack"
8. "Talkin' Turkey"
9. "Low Rider"
10. "Dunkarini"
11. "Closing the Deal"
12. "Performance Anxiety"
13. "Keeping Up with the Joneses"

=== Season two ===
Season two premiered on January 31, 2007, bringing the total number of episodes to 28 + the lost pilot

1. "The Contenders"
2. "Women Drivers"
3. "Green Peas"
4. "Fired Up!"
5. "Oil Crisis!"
6. "Magic Blue Room"
7. "Ugly Truckling"
8. "Sunny Day"
9. "Hoop Dreamz"
10. "The Chopping Block"
11. "The O-Zone"
12. "Even Cowboys Get the Blues"
13. "Hoppy Birthday"
14. "Calendar Guys"
15. "Who Wears the Pants?"
16. "Hair to the Throne"

== Home media ==
King of Cars Season 1 is on DVD at the A&E Store, there are no plans for a season 2 DVD release at this time.

== Appearances on other TV Shows ==
Josh "Chop" Towbin appeared in Pawn Stars Season 8 episode 6 "Comfortably Chum" where he bought a 1924 Dodge Brothers business sedan for $7,900. The sedan was acquired in Season 5 episode 11, "Corey's Big Play". He also has appeared on Jimmy Kimmel and The Tonight Show, and appeared as a guest five times on Dr. Phil as the Car Expert giving multiple cars away to those in need and mentoring women on the buying process. Chop was also in the season premier for Faking It and Street Customs on the TLC Network and Take This Job on A&E.
