= Pilgrim Media Group =

American television production company

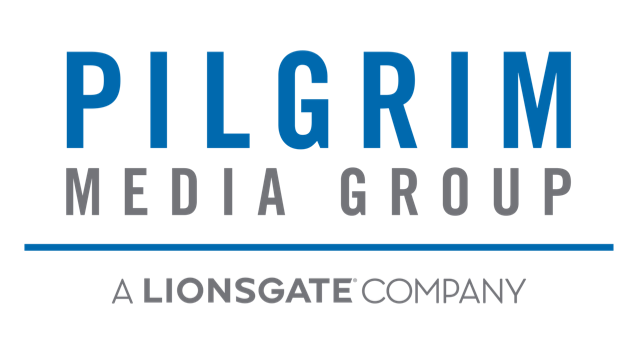
- Formerly: Pilgrim Studios
- Type: Subsidiary
- Industry: Television production
- Founded: 1997; 29 years ago
- Founder: Craig Piligian
- Headquarters: North Hollywood, California
- Parent: Lionsgate Television (2015–2024); Lionsgate Alternative Television (2024–present)
- Website: https://www.pilgrimmediagroup.com/

Pilgrim Media Group (also known as Pilgrim Studios) is a television production company based in North Hollywood, California. It was founded in 1997 by Craig Piligian. It is best known for producing reality television shows for the Discovery Channel. In 2022 Pilgrim became a minority owner in the podcasting company Lionsgate Sound with Lions Gate Entertainment, which launched on October 19, 2022.

== Acquisition by Lionsgate ==
On November 12, 2015, Lions Gate Entertainment created a partnership with Piligian when the studio acquired more than 50% of Pilgrim Studios for $200 million. Piligian retained his position as CEO of the company while Pilgrim continued to operate independently under Piligian. The deal allowed Lionsgate to move into unscripted television programming.

== Television series ==
- Amazing America with Sarah Palin
- American Casino
- American Chopper
- American Hot Rod
- American Ninja Warrior (Co-production with G4 for Ninja Warrior)
- Battlefish
- The Big Brain Theory
- Bounty Girls
- The Cut
- Build It Bigger: Rebuilding Greensburg
- Covert Action
- Cupid
- Destroyed In Seconds
- Dirty Jobs
- Extreme Loggers
- Extreme Peril
- Fast N' Loud
- Firehouse USA: Boston
- Full Metal Jousting
- Ghost Hunters
- Ghost Hunters International
- Ghost Hunters Academy
- Girl Meets Cowboy
- Greensburg
- Guilty Or Innocent?
- Hazard Pay
- Lindsay
- Man vs. Cartoon
- Master Of Dance
- Misfit Garage
- NY-SPI Investigates
- Only in America with Larry the Cable Guy
- Out of the Wild: The Alaska Experiment
- Out of the Wild: Venezuela
- The Real Exorcist
- Really Big Things
- Rocco Gets Real
- The Runner
- Sandhogs
- SEMA: The World's Greatest Car Show
- Somebody's Gotta Do It
- Southern Steel
- Scamanda
- Street Customs
- Street Outlaws
- Strip Search
- SWAT: Tactical Force
- Swamp Loggers
- TapouT
- Top Hooker
- Top Shot
- The Ultimate Fighter
- The Ultimate Surfer
- UFO Hunters
- Worst Case Scenarios (co-produced by Columbia TriStar Domestic Television (later known as Sony Pictures Television)
- You Spoof Discovery
