= Funk Flex Full Throttle =

2010 American TV series

- Presented by: Funkmaster Flex
- Country of origin: United States
- Original language: English
- No. of seasons: 2
- No. of episodes: 16

Production
- Executive producers: Eric Conte; Funkmaster Flex; Lee Harris; Paul Ricci
- Running time: 22 minutes

Original release
- Network: MTV2
- Release: May 2, 2010 – June 26, 2011

Funk Flex Full Throttle is an American television series that premiered May 2, 2010, on MTV2 and ended on June 26, 2011. The series hosted by Funkmaster Flex, finds hip hop artists showcasing their car collections, as well as the customization projects ongoing at Flex's New York garage.

== Episodes ==
=== Season 1 (2010) ===
No. overall	No. in season	Title	Original release date
1	1	"Episode 1"	May 2, 2010
Rapper Drake is interviewed by Funkmaster Flex.
2	2	"Episode 2"	May 9, 2010
Comedian Mike Epps and rapper Fabolous stop by the shop.
3	3	"Episode 3"	May 16, 2010
Rapper Juelz Santana is interviewed. Also: a '65 Buick Riviera is customized.
4	4	"Episode 4"	May 23, 2010
Diddy stops by to talk about hot cars; the crew customizes a 1971 Oldsmobile Cutlass.
5	5	"Episode 5"	May 30, 2010
Nicki Minaj and Swizz Beatz are interviewed. Also: a 1967 Chevrolet Chevelle is customized.
6	6	"Episode 6"	June 6, 2010
Trey Songz, Ludacris and Pitbull are guests.
7	7	"Episode 7"	June 13, 2010
Funkmaster Flex visits the New York International Auto Show with rappers Jadakiss, Jim Jones, Red Café and Maino.
8	8	"Episode 8"	June 20, 2010
Ludacris is interviewed.

=== Season 2 (2011) ===
No. overall	No. in season	Title	Original release date
1	9	"Episode 9"	May 8, 2011
Funkmaster Flex interviews 50 Cent. Also rapper Lloyd Banks' '65 Impala is customized.
2	10	"Episode 10"	May 15, 2011
Chris Brown and Cory Gunz are interviewed.
3	11	"Episode 11"	May 22, 2011
Nicki Minaj is interviewed.
4	12	"Episode 12"	May 29, 2011
Cam'ron, Jim Jones, Juelz Santana and Vado are interviewed.
5	13	"Episode 13"	June 5, 2011
Fabolous stops by the garage and Flex customizes a '65 Belvedere for him.
6	14	"Episode 14"	June 12, 2011
Amar'e Stoudemire of the New York Knicks is interviewed.
7	15	"Episode 15"	June 19, 2011
Funkmaster Flex heads to the New York International Auto Show with Joel Ortiz, Big Sean and Tinie Tempah.
8	16	"Episode 16"	June 26, 2011
The Lox and Rick Ross are interviewed.
