= Rides (American TV series) =

- Starring: Jason Priestley; Chip Foose; 310 Motoring; West Coast Customs; Rad Rides by Troy; MillenWorks
- Country of origin: United States
- No. of seasons: 4
- No. of episodes: 54

Production
- Executive producer: Matt Kennedy Gould
- Running time: 60 minutes

Original release
- Network: TLC
- Release: January 6, 2004 – November 15, 2005

Rides is an automotive reality television show produced for the TLC Network in the United States. The show's host is the automobile enthusiast and amateur racer Jason Priestley. Rides began in summer 2004 and became TLC's highest-rated series of the year.

== Cars ==
The majority of the cars seen in the show were one-off (non-production) cars or concept cars such as the Ford Shelby GR-1 and the Ford Shelby Cobra Concept. The show also showed the building aspects and techniques used for creating cars.
