= Fine Living =

Fine Living may refer to:

- Fine Living (European TV channel), a European television channel, owned and operated by Scripps Networks Interactive
- Fine Living (Italy), an Italian television channel, owned and operated by Scripps Networks Interactive

== See also ==
- Cooking Channel, formerly Fine Living in the United States
- DIY Network (Canada), formerly Fine Living in Canada
