= Louisiana Flip N Move =

- Genre: Reality television
- Country of origin: United States
- Original language: English

Production
- Running time: 40 minutes

Original release
- Network: DIY Network
- Release: October 14, 2016 – September 26, 2017

Louisiana Flip N Move is a show featured on DIY Network.

== Premise ==
Louisiana Flip N Move is the spin-off of Texas Flip N Move. The show features professional home renovators who purchase older houses to flip for profit, in and around New Orleans, Louisiana.

Like the original show, the show features a twist: at the auction, only the houses are sold (not the underlying land). The bidders can only view the home from the outside and must also factor in costs of moving house from the original lot to the renovation site (another facility where the houses are renovated and later sold at auction to purchasers wanting houses to move to existing property, currently located in New Orleans metropolitan area).

The flippers do buy land on this show to place the house and remodel (unlike Texas FlipNMove where the land is (usually) not included at the final auction after the remodel) The land is included in the purchase of Louisiana Flip N Move. Before each auction it tells how much the land cost the move to the land and the remodel cost. Because of the physical attributes of the Louisiana area, houses occasionally have to be moved via water unlike in the Texas show where all houses were moved by land.

== Series overview ==
Season	Episodes	Originally released	
Season	Episodes	First released	Last released
1	4	October 14, 2016	November 4, 2016
2	13	July 7, 2017	September 26, 2017

=== Season 1 (2016) ===
No. overall	No. in season	Title	Original release date
1	1	"Mike and Megan's Floating Bayou Beauty"	October 14, 2016
2	2	"Pine Design vs. Cute Cottage"	October 21, 2016
3	3	"Church vs. Historic Home Flip"	October 28, 2016
4	4	"Duplex Becomes a Bungalow"	November 4, 2016

=== Season 2 (2017) ===
No. overall	No. in season	Title	Original release date
5	1	"Shotgun House Sale"	July 7, 2017
6	2	"Barge Build vs. Carriage House"	July 14, 2017
7	3	"The Walker's Bamboo Build vs. The Foster's Retro Residence"	July 20, 2017
8	4	"The Walker's Ramshackle Redo and the Foster's Brick House Blunder"	July 20, 2017
9	5	"French Flat vs. Jazzy Joint"	July 28, 2017
10	6	"Arched Abode"	August 4, 2017
11	7	"From Swampy to Swanky"	August 11, 2017
12	8	"Gulf Coast Revival"	August 18, 2017
13	9	"Flooded Fixer"	August 29, 2017
14	10	"Reclaimed Residence"	September 5, 2017
15	11	"Glass House vs. Family Pad"	September 12, 2017
16	12	"Americana vs. Hunting Lodge"	September 19, 2017
17	13	"Flip N Spin"	September 26, 2017

== See also ==
- Texas Flip N Move
