= Fine Living (Italian TV channel) =

Italian television channel

- Fine Living logo
- Country: Italy
- Broadcast area: Italy

Programming
- Language: Italian
- Picture format: 576i (16:9 SDTV)

Ownership
- Owner: Discovery Inc.

History
- Launched: 26 March 2014; 11 years ago
- Replaced: Coming Soon Television
- Closed: 22 October 2017; 7 years ago
- Replaced by: Spike

Links
- Website: www.fineliving.it

Availability

Terrestrial
- Digital: Channel 49

Fine Living was an Italian television channel, owned and operated by Discovery Inc., an American media company. It started airing on Italian terrestrial television on 26 March 2014, replacing Coming Soon Television.

It was broadcast in Italian in 576i 16:9 format.

== History ==
The channel was launched in Italy on 26 March 2014 on channel 49 of the digital terrestrial television as a replacement of Coming Soon Television. It started broadcasting at 06:00 with In cucina con Giada.

The channel had collaborated until 31 December 2015, with La EFFE for the creation of cross-channel advertising strategies; the publicity concessionaire was PRS MediaGroup.

On 22 October 2017 the channel was closed and replaced by Viacom's new Spike channel.

== Programming ==
Programs on Fine Living are of factual entertainment and are originated from the categories of Design & Décor, Food & Drink and Travel & Adventure.

=== Original programs ===
- Buono a sapersi
- La seconda casa non si scorda mai
- Colpo di cucina
- Ypsilon Tellers

=== Imported programs ===
- A caccia di occasioni (Flea Market Flip)
- A tavola con Guy (Diners, Drive-Ins and Dives)
- Adam Richman's Best Sandwich in America
- Affari in cantina (Garage Gold)
- Affari in valigia (Baggage Battles)
- All'inseguimento della pietra preziosa (Gem Hunt)
- Antonio Style (The Antonio Treatment)
- Brian Boitano: La mia casa in Italia (The Brian Boitano Project)
- Brunelleschi Constructions (Cousins on Call)
- Casa ai Caraibi (Caribbean Life)
- Casa su misura (Fixer Upper)
- Case da un milione di dollari (Million Dollar Contractor)
- Cash and Cari
- Ci pensa Bronson (The Bronson Pinchot Project)
- Cina in cucina (Easy Chinese)
- Color Splash
- Come ti trasformo la casa (Rehab Addict)
- Cucine da rifare (Kitchen Cousins)
- Dolci da sogno (Unique Sweets)
- Extreme Cuisine with Jeff Corwin
- Giada: Viaggi da sogno (Giada in Paradise)
- Giardini impossibili (Going Yard)
- Gourmet Trains: Viaggi del gusto (Jonathan Phang's Gourmet Trains)
- Hawaii Life
- Hotel da incubo (Hotel Impossible)
- House Hunters International
- I Caraibi in cucina (Jonathan Phang's Caribbean Coockbook)
- Il re dei broker (Power Broker)
- In cucina con Giada (Giada at Home)
- In cucina con Ina Garten (Barefoot Contessa)
- La guerra delle torte (Cupcake Wars)
- La seconda casa non si paga mai (Vacation House for Free)
- Le case più estreme del mondo (Extreme Homes)
- Le case più estreme sull'acqua (Extreme Houseboats)
- Le case più verdi del mondo (World's Greenest Homes)
- Londra in vendita (Selling London)
- Los Angeles in vendita (Selling LA)
- Man Finds Food
- Man Fire Food
- Man v. Food
- Mega Ville (Mega Mansions)
- Messico in cucina (Mexican Made Easy)
- Mi compro un'isola (Island Hunters)
- Natale alla Casa Bianca (White House Christmas Special)
- New York in vendita (Selling New York)
- Nuova casa a sorpresa (Cousins Undercover)
- Occasioni in riva al mare (Beachfront Bargain Hunt)
- Operazione Casa (Renovation Raiders)
- Orrori da gustare America (Bizarre Foods America)
- Pazzi per i tacos (Taco Trip)
- Pazzie di Natale (Christmas Crazier)
- Piccantissimo (Heat Seekers)
- Piscine da urlo (Cool Pools)
- Presentato ad arte (Sugar Dome)
- Resort da incubo (Resort Rescue)
- Restaurant: Impossible
- Reza, principe delle spezie (Reza, Spice Prince of India)
- Ristoranti allo sbando (Restaurant Stakeout)
- Sabrina: Design accessibili (The High Low Project)
- Sapori dal Medio Oriente (Shane Delia's Spice Journey)
- Sorelle in affari (Junk Gypsies)
- Sorpresa di Natale (Holiday Kitchen Takeover with Giada and Sabrina)
- Spie al ristorante (Mystery Diners)
- Stanze da sogno (Million Dollar Room)
- Street Food (Street Eats)
- Un mondo da bere (Booze Traveler)
- Trip Flip: Viaggi a sorpresa (Trip Flip)
- Tutti i segreti del lusso (Jenny Powell's Luxury Uncovered)
- Una coppia in affari (Flip or Flop)
- Vista mare (Hot Beach Houses)
- Weekend con Giada (Giada's Weekend Getaways)

== See also ==
- Fine Living (Canada)
- Fine Living Network
- Fine Living (Europe)
