= Matt Corboy =

American actor

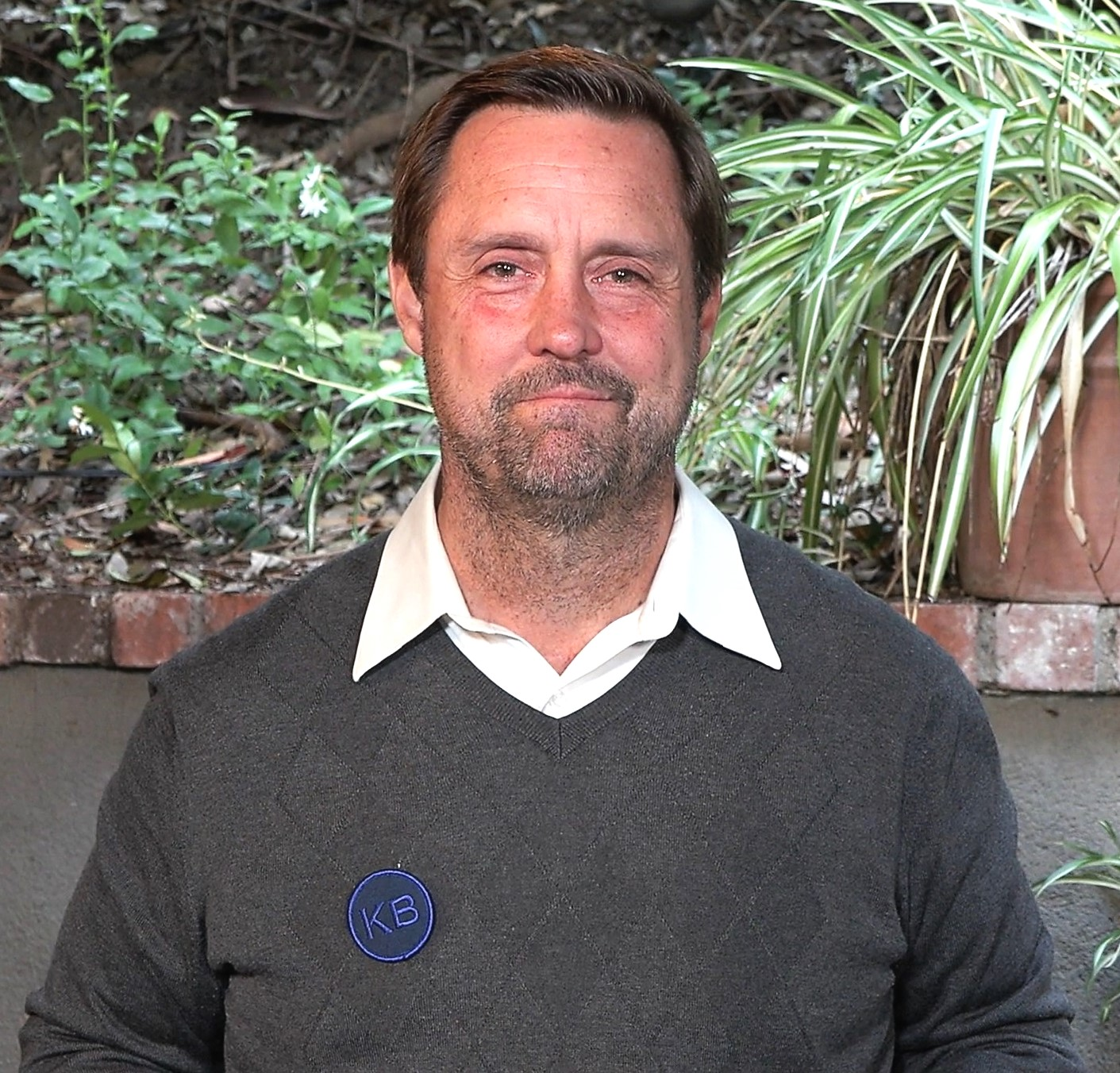
- Corboy at the Kirk Baily celebration of life in 2022
- Born: June 4, 1973 (age 53); Honolulu, Hawaii
- Occupation: Actor
- Years active: 1996–present
- Height: 6 ft 1 in (185 cm)
- Spouse: Kara McNamara Corboy (m. 2001)
- Children: 1

Matt Corboy (born June 4, 1973) is an American actor.

== Early life ==
Corboy was born in Honolulu, Hawaii, and grew up there, before leaving to attend Colorado State University, where he earned a degree in business.

== Career ==
Corboy took up acting in 1996, and has appeared in many commercials, films, and had one-time guest roles in television series. His best-known role was on The Shield, where he appeared as Officer Ray Carlson in 17 episodes. In 2011, he played Cousin Ralph in The Descendants, which received widespread critical acclaim and multiple awards including an Academy Award for Best Adapted Screenplay.

While growing up in Hawaii, Corboy would play poker with his friends. His affinity for the game led to him becoming the lead commentator for the Professional Poker Tour in 2006.

In mid–2017, Corboy was cast in the recurring character Jared Preston Jr. on the ABC soap opera General Hospital to help facilitate Rebecca Budig's character Hayden Barnes exit off of the soap.

== Personal life ==
Corboy has been married to Kara McNamara Corboy since August 4, 2001.

== Filmography ==
=== Film ===
Year	Title	Role	Notes	Ref.
1999	Blood Dolls	Warbeck Security	Direct-to-video	
1999	Planet Patrol	Technician / Shape Machine		
1999	The Big Blind	Lane		
2001	Long Lost Love	Jeff		
2004	Knuckle Sandwich	'THE' Lance		
2005	Lilo & Stitch 2: Stitch Has a Glitch	Additional voices	Direct-to-video	
2005	The Adventures of Big Handsome Guy and His Little Friend	Bar Jerk	Short film	
2011	The Descendants	Cousin Ralph		
2015	Circle	Husband (Craig)		
2015	Straight Outta Compton	Journalist		
2016	Masterminds	Boss		
2016	Passengers	Video Game (voice)		
2017	Please Stand By	TV Host		
2018	Dude	Officer Clarke		
2018	The Oath	Clint Marks		
2022	Paws of Fury: The Legend of Hank	Additional Voices		
2022	The Wind & the Reckoning	Sheriff Stoltz		

=== Television ===
Year	Title	Role	Notes
1997	The Pretender	Chris Welman	Episode: "Over the Edge"
1999	Seven Days	Waiter	Episode: "A Dish Best Served Cold"
1999	JAG	Jimmy Ambler	Episode: "Psychic Warrior"
2000	One World	Emcee	Episode: "Marci's in Hot Salsa"
2000	The District	Cop #1	Episode: "The Santa Wars"
2001	Spin City	Boyfriend	Episode: "Chinatown"
2002–08	The Shield	Ray Carlson	Recurring role
2003	Malcolm in the Middle	Husband	Episode: "Garage Sale"
2005	Cold Case	Terrence	Episode: "Committed"
2005–06	Lilo & Stitch: The Series	Various voices	Episodes: "PJ", "Ploot" and "Lax"
2006	Threshold	Carl	Episode: "The Crossing"
2006	The West Wing	Asst. Secretary Blieden	Episode: "Duck and Cover"
2006	The Loop	Kenneth	Episode: "Jack Air"
2006	Sweat Equity	Narrator	Narration of 39 of 128 episodes
2007	Mad TV	Matt	Episode: "Episode 12"
2007	World Poker Tour	Commentator	Episode: "WPT Fathers and Sons"
2008	Giants of Radio	Scoot	Television film
2008	NCIS	Petty Officer Lance Tolliver	Episode: "Dog Tags"
2008	Atom TV	Dennis	Episode: "Great Moments in Human Interaction"
2015	Criminal Minds	Officer Tom Polinsky	Episode: "Lockdown"
2016	The Thundermans	Mr. Silver Eagle	Episode: "Back to School"
2017	How to Get Away with Murder	Barry Thompson	Episode: "Was She Ever Good at Her Job?"
2018	Raven's Home	Richard	Episode: "Cop to It"
2022	This is Us	Matt Dickson	Episode: "Heart and Soul"

=== Video games ===
Year	Title	Role	Notes
2011	L.A. Noire	Lars Taraldsen	
