= Sammy Monsour =

American Chef

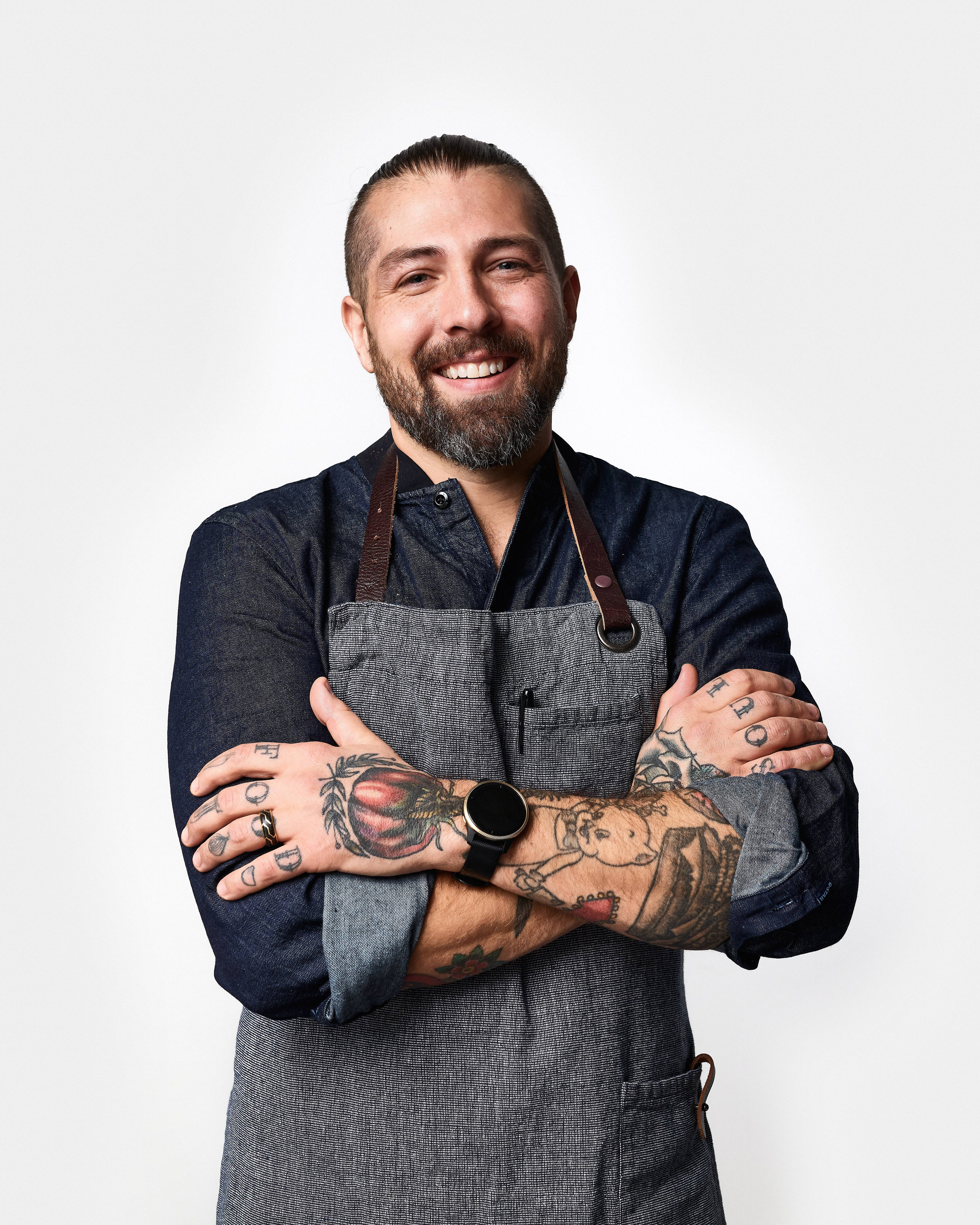
- Culinary career
- Cooking style: Modern Southern, Sustainable Seafood, American Street Food
- Current restaurant(s): Joyce Soul & Sea (Los Angeles, CA)
- Award(s) won: Michelin Bib Gourmand, Zagat 30 Under 30
- Website: chefsammymonsour.com

Samuel Monsour is an American chef, restaurateur, author, and political food activist.

Monsour's work outside the kitchen focuses primarily on ocean conservation and sustainable food systems. He is involved with Chefs Manifesto—a SDG2 Zero Hunger Action Network. He also serves as a consultant to the Environmental Defense Fund, where he assisted in launching the Coalition for Sustainable Aquaculture and leads a national team of chef ambassadors.

== Career ==
Monsour began working with food in grade school as a kitchen porter at his parents' luncheon in downtown Raleigh. In the Summer of 1997, he started working as a dishwasher at his parents full-service neighborhood restaurant in Chapel Hill. By 1999 he was promoted to line cook and began learning the trade of professional cooking from his father. Upon graduating from Cary High School in 2001, he went to Hyde Park, New York where he studied at The Culinary Institute of America, receiving an associate degree in Culinary Arts, a bachelor's degree in Culinary Arts Management, a perfect attendance award, and Dean's list honors.

Soon after graduation from college, he traveled around the United States staging for 2 years in New York, Chicago, Portland, Seattle, Los Angeles, Louisville, Austin, and San Antonio.

In 2008 Monsour moved to Boston where he received a role on the opening team of award-winning chef Michael Schlow's 606 Congress located at the Renaissance Boston Waterfront Hotel.

=== Restaurants ===
In 2010, Monsour teamed up with seasoned Boston restaurateur Babak Bina to open the gastropub jm Curley in Downtown Crossing. After receiving a favorable review from The Boston Globe's food critic Devra First, jm Curley quickly became a local sensation. Monsour's weekly changing pop-culture inspired tribute menus like "Goodbye Breaking Bad" and "Wu-Tang Clan's 36 Chambers 20th Anniversary" garnered local press and a strong fan base that launched his career to a national level.

In 2013, Monsour and Bina opened Bogie's Place, a 20-seat boutique steakhouse with a speakeasy style hidden entrance. Bogie's Place received positive reviews and acclaim from The Boston Globe, Eater, and Boston Magazine, as was featured on season 1 of Adam Richman's Secret Eats.

In January 2013, Monsour launched a monthly charity dinner series, Revelry for Charity. Once a month, Monsour hosted and cooked with acclaimed chefs from around the US, furthering his network and culinary discipline. Some of the chefs Monsour worked with throughout Revelry for Charity include Dominique Crenn, Ashley Christensen, Jamie Bissonnette, Edward Lee, Ken Oringer, and Jeremy Fox.

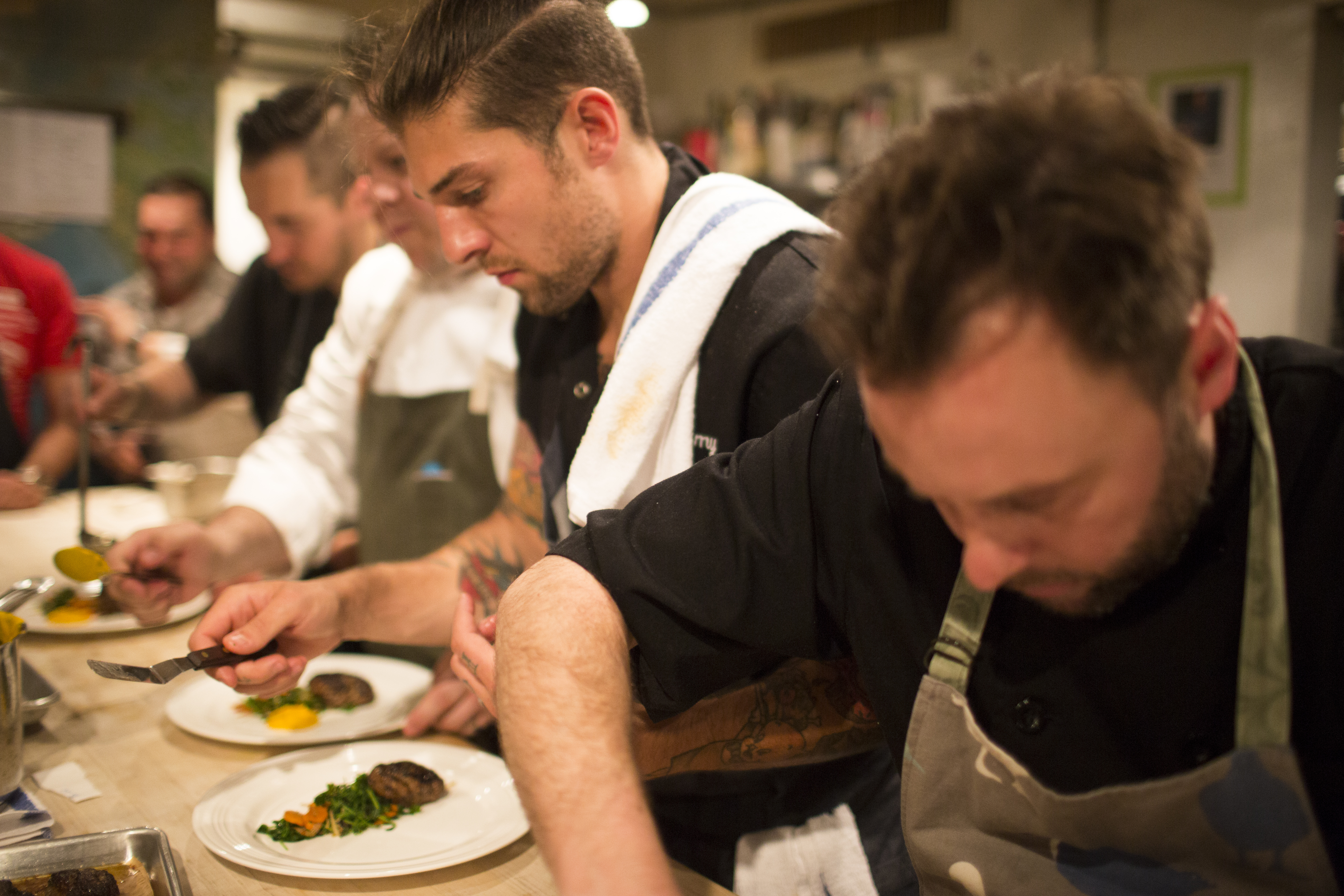
Monsour's The Future of Junk Food pop-up at the James Beard House in Manhattan, NY.

In Spring of 2014, Monsour launched The Future of Junk Food, a socio-political pop-up restaurant dedicated to recreating iconic American junk food with sustainably sourced local, seasonal ingredients. Much like the processed food industry, Monsour's culinary techniques were rooted strongly in molecular gastronomy, and as his pop-up series traveled around the US, he received rave reviews for his playful and innovative creativity.

In January 2016, Monsour teamed up with restaurateur Josh Kopel as executive chef and co-owner of Preux & Proper, a two-floor 225 seat full-service restaurant offering Modern Southern Cuisine in downtown Los Angeles. In 2019, Preux & Proper was awarded a Bib Gourmand in the Michelin Guide California.

In January 2018, Monsour and Kopel launched South City Fried Chicken, a fast casual fried chicken restaurant dedicated to sustainable sourcing and scratch cooking. South City Fried Chicken received positive reviews from LA's major food publications, including Los Angeles Magazine, LA Times, Eater LA, and the "Best Fried Chicken Sandwich" in Los Angeles delineation from LA Weekly. In August 2023, Monsour and his wife Kassady Wiggins teamed up with husband and wife team Prince and Athena Riley to open Joyce, a 100-seat full-service restaurant offering Modern Coastal Southern food, beverage, and hospitality in downtown Los Angeles with a focus on sustainable seafood and zero-landfill craft cocktails.

==== Television ====
Monsour's first national television appearance was in 2013 on season 1 of Guy's Grocery Games, which he was the first contestant of the series to win the full cash prize of $20,000. Soon thereafter, Monsour signed with Agency for the Performing Arts and veteran talent agent John Seitzer. In 2020, Seitzer moved to United Talent Agency and brought Monsour with him. Since 2013, Monsour has appeared as himself on over twenty televised programs spanning eight major networks and streaming platforms, from cooking competitions and food focused travelogues, to family friendly daytime talk shows and eclectic unconventional programming.

== Filmography ==
Television
Year	Title	Network	Role	Notes
2013	Guys Grocery Games	Food Network	Himself	Season 1 episode 5: "Feisty Fiesta" Episode Winner
2014	Diners, Drive-ins and Dives	Food Network	Himself	Season 21 episode 2: "Seriously Saucy"
2014	Cutthroat Kitchen	Food Network	Himself	Season 3 episode 7: "The Rice Stuff"
2015	Hollywood Cycle	E!	Himself	Season 1 episode 3: "Odd Man Out"
2015	Secret Eats with Adam Richman	Travel Channel	Himself	Season 1 episode 10: "Harbor Hideaway and Lobster Garage"
2015	Cutthroat Kitchen	Food Network	Himself	Season 7 episode 12: "Evilicious: Frying First Class" Episode Winner
2015	Cutthroat Kitchen	Food Network	Himself	Season 7 episode 15: "Evilicious: Finale" Episode Winner / Evilicious Tournament Winner
2015	Home & Family	Hallmark Channel	Himself	Season 3 episode 180: "Sam Monsour/Travis Wall"
2015	Home & Family	Hallmark Channel	Himself	Season 4 episode 15: "Jenna Elfman/Kelly Jenrette/Sam Monsour"
2016	Home & Family	Hallmark Channel	Himself	Season 5 episode 36: "Halloween"
2017	Food Paradise	Travel Channel	Himself	Season 4 episode 9: "Sausage Kings"
2017	Guys Big Project	Food Network	Himself	Season 1 episode 2: "The Bite"
2017	Guys Grocery Games	Food Network	Himself	Season 12 episode 11: "Supermarket Masters Tournament: Part 1" Episode Winner
2017	Guys Grocery Games	Food Network	Himself	Season 12 episode 15: "Supermarket Masters Tournament: Finale"
2018	Home & Family	Hallmark Channel	Himself	Season 7 episode 25: "Jonathan Bennett/Diedrich Bader"
2018	The Untitled Action Bronson Show	Viceland	Himself	Season 1 episode 54: "A Knockout Episode with Laila Ali"
2018	Guys Grocery Games	Food Network	Himself	Season 16 episode 3: "GGG vs DDD"
2019	Straight Up Steve Austin	USA Network	Himself	Season 1 episode 1: "Rob Riggle"
2020	Home & Family	Hallmark Channel	Himself	Season 9 episode 53: "Candace Cameron Bure/Lacey Chabart & Will Kemp/Jen Lilley"
2020	Food Paradise	Travel Channel	Himself	Season 14 episode 10: "Guilty Pleasures"
2021	Guys Grocery Games	Food Network	Himself	Season 25 episode 16: Delivery: High-End at Home"
2021	The Best Thing I Ever Ate	Food Network	Himself	Season 12 episode 14: "Super Spuds"
2021	Best Bobby Flay	Food Network	Himself	Season 26 episode 3: "Don't Be Salty"
2022	Chefs vs. Wild	Hulu	Himself	Season 1 episode 1: "Smoked Out"

== Activism and Public Policy Influence ==
Beginning his food activism work in 2012, Monsour joined a national campaign to stop the Pebble Mine in Bristol Bay by implementing sustainable sourcing, menu writing, and public relations efforts to raise awareness for this issue. Since then, Monsour has extended his fight for good food beyond the confines of his restaurants, engaging in local, national, and global initiatives, including legislative policy work, lobbying, speaking engagements, video production, authoring op-eds, thought leadership, and online culinary courses focused on sustainable cooking, history and culture. Dedicated to running his kitchens to the highest standards of sustainability, Monsour's restaurants have earned a place on the Good Food 100 list, and his commitment to eco-friendly business practices has been acknowledged with a Green Star from the City of Los Angeles.

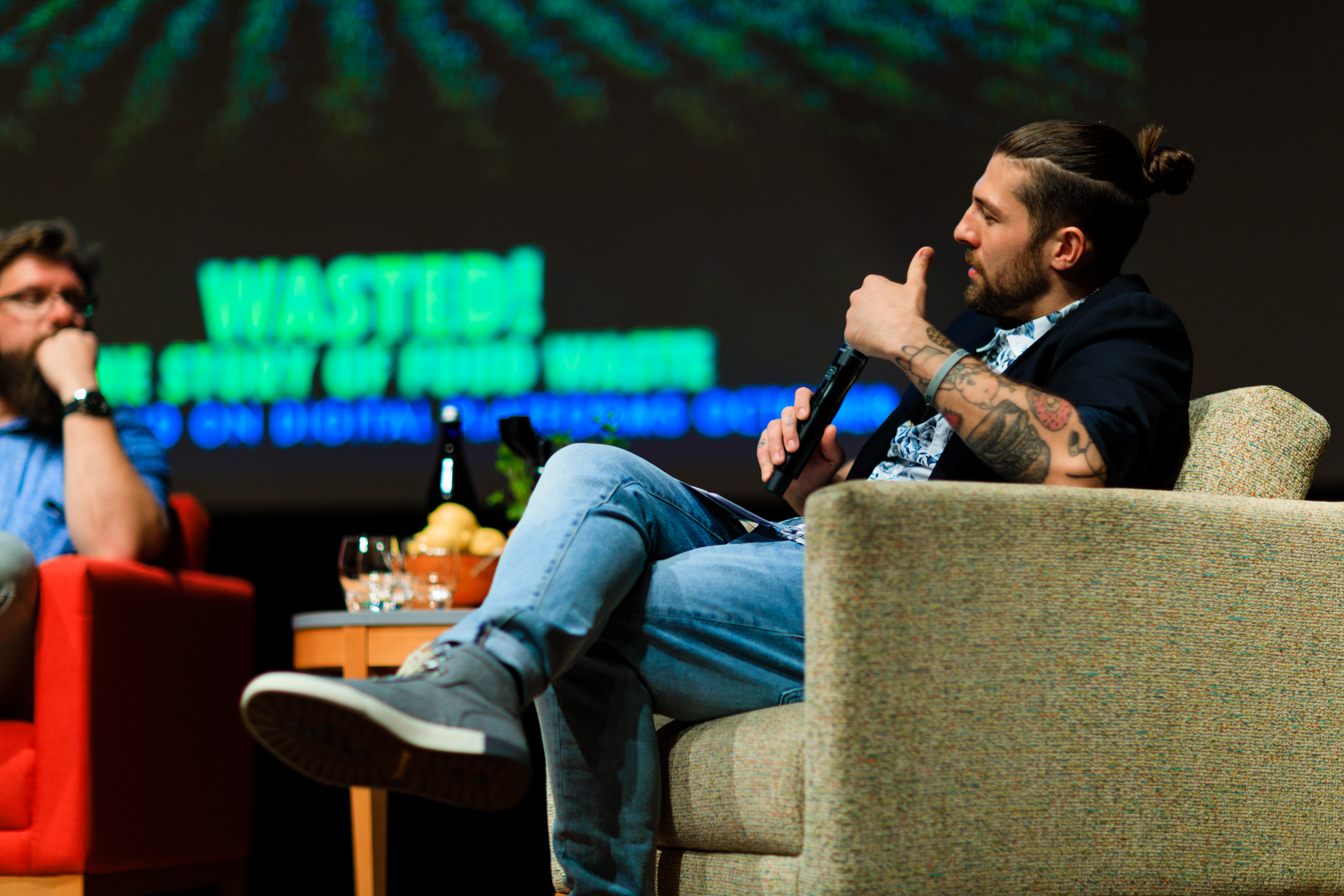
Monsour moderating celebrity chef panel after Wasted! screening.

In the Spring of 2018, Monsour lead the Chefs Collaborative to host and organize the Los Angeles screening of Executive Producer Anthony Bourdain's Wasted! The Story of Food Waste at the Huntington Library, Art Museum, and Botanical Gardens. After the screening, Monsour lead a panel discussion on food waste, interviewing award-winning Los Angeles based chefs Nyesha Arrington, Minh Phan, Michael Cimarusti, and Neal Fraser. After the theatre portion of the event, Monsour then hosted and cooked alongside his wife Kassady Wiggins at a strolling food and cocktail event which focused on culinary techniques that illustrated innovative food waste reduction principles and techniques.

During the Fall of 2018, Monsour convened with a group of award-winning chefs in Portland, Oregon. Together, they laid the groundwork for The Portland Pact for Sustainable Seafood, signaling their commitment to sourcing and serving from sustainable U.S. fisheries. The Portland Pact called for an increased level of climate awareness and a continued commitment to science-based fisheries management via the Magnuson-Stevens Act. In the Spring of 2019, Monsour headed to Capitol Hill in Washington, D.C. and delivered the Portland Pact to Congress, personally meeting with Congressman Jared Huffman, Chair of the Water, Oceans and Wildlife subcommittee. In 2021, Rep. Jared Huffman (D-CA) introduced legislation to reauthorize the Magnuson-Stevens Act (H.R. 4690 – the Sustaining America's Fisheries for the Future Act).

In the Fall of 2019, Monsour served as a U.S. Chef Diplomat in Italy for the World Food Day proceedings at the Food and Agriculture Organization's headquarters in Rome. Joined by fellow chefs of The Chefs Manifesto, Monsour cooked sustainable seafood for global leaders and spoke about the important role that sustainable aquaculture can play in ending hunger while progressing global food systems.

In January 2021, Monsour joined the Environmental Defense Fund as Chef Lead in their endeavor to build The Coalition for Sustainable Aquaculture, where he compiled and leads a team of over 20 nationally acclaimed chef activists. In the Fall of 2023, the CSA played an instrumental role in introducing the SEAfood Act to Congress.

In the Fall of 2022, Monsour collaborated with Element Hotels and Lettuce Grow as a creative contributor and chef spokesperson to promote accessible, healthy, plant forward meals for travelers. The ongoing collaboration seeks to reduce the carbon footprint associated with food and travel, while inspiring more Americans to produce their own food via time and space saving gardening resources and food system innovations.

== Books ==
- American Burger Revival: Brazen Recipes to Electrify a Timeless Classic. Globe Pequot / Union Park Press. 2015. ISBN 978-1934598139.
- Salt & Shore: Recipes from the Coastal South. Weldon Owen. 2024. ISBN 979-8886741230.
