= Bath Crashers =

Television series

- Genre: Reality
- Starring: Matt Muenster
- Country of origin: United States
- Original language: English
- No. of seasons: 12
- No. of episodes: 155

Original release
- Network: DIY Network
- Release: January 7, 2010 – January 4, 2016

Bath Crashers is a television show on the DIY Network that features host and licensed contractor Matt Muenster surprising home owners with a brand-new bathroom. Like other "crasher" shows on the DIY Network, Muenster and his crew ambush homeowners while they are home improvement shopping, follow them back to their homes, tear apart their bathrooms and help them do a complete bathroom overhaul. Muenster was previously the host of BATHtastic, another DIY Network show.

== Episodes ==
Season	Episodes	Originally released	
Season	Episodes	First released	Last released
1	13	February 7, 2010	October 4, 2010
2	13	October 11, 2010	March 8, 2011
3	13	July 4, 2011	September 19, 2011
4	13	October 10, 2011	February 12, 2012
5	12	April 30, 2012	July 12, 2012
6	13	July 13, 2012	December 3, 2012
7	14	January 21, 2013	June 19, 2013
8	13	July 10, 2013	November 25, 2013
9	14	January 20, 2014	September 29, 2014
10	13	September 29, 2014	August 19, 2015
11	13	April 20, 2015	November 16, 2015
12	13	October 26, 2015	January 4, 2016

== See also ==
- Candice Tells All
- Divine Design
- Fixer Upper
- Flip or Flop
- Income Property
- Love It or List It
- Property Brothers
- Take This House and Sell It
- Yard Crashers
