= Allison Whitlock =

Australian crafter

Allison Whitlock was an Australian born craft stylist, designer and owner of the homewares label homeMADEmodern. In 2005 Allison became the host of DIY Network's Uncommon Threads, a daily half-hour craft program. In 2006 the series was picked up for a second season and began airing on HGTV in 2007.
