= Yard Crashers =

Television series

- Genre: Reality
- Starring: Matt Blashaw (2011–2014); Ahmed Hassan (2008–2011)
- Theme music composer: Ron Wasserman (2017-present)
- Country of origin: United States
- Original language: English
- No. of seasons: 13
- No. of episodes: 173

Production
- Production location: All over the world
- Production company: Big Table Media

Original release
- Network: DIY Network
- Release: April 7, 2008 – June 24, 2017

Yard Crashers is a television show on the DIY Network that surprises home owners with a brand-new yard. The show is hosted by Matt Blashaw who is a licensed contractor. Like other "crasher" shows on the DIY Network, Blashaw and his crew ambush homeowners while they are home improvement shopping, follow them back to their homes, tear apart their yards and help them do a complete backyard makeover. They do the complete renovation in two filming days. The previous host, Ahmed Hassan (2008–2011), was replaced by Matt Blashaw in 2011. Blashaw is also taking a hiatus from the show, hosting HGTV's Vacation House For Free, starting summer 2014. Chris Lambton will temporarily host Yard Crashers.

== See also ==
- Bath Crashers
- Candice Tells All
- Divine Design
- Fixer Upper
- Flip or Flop
- Income Property
- Love It or List It
- Property Brothers
- Take This House and Sell It
