= Burnside Brewing Company =

Brewery based in Portland, Oregon, U.S.

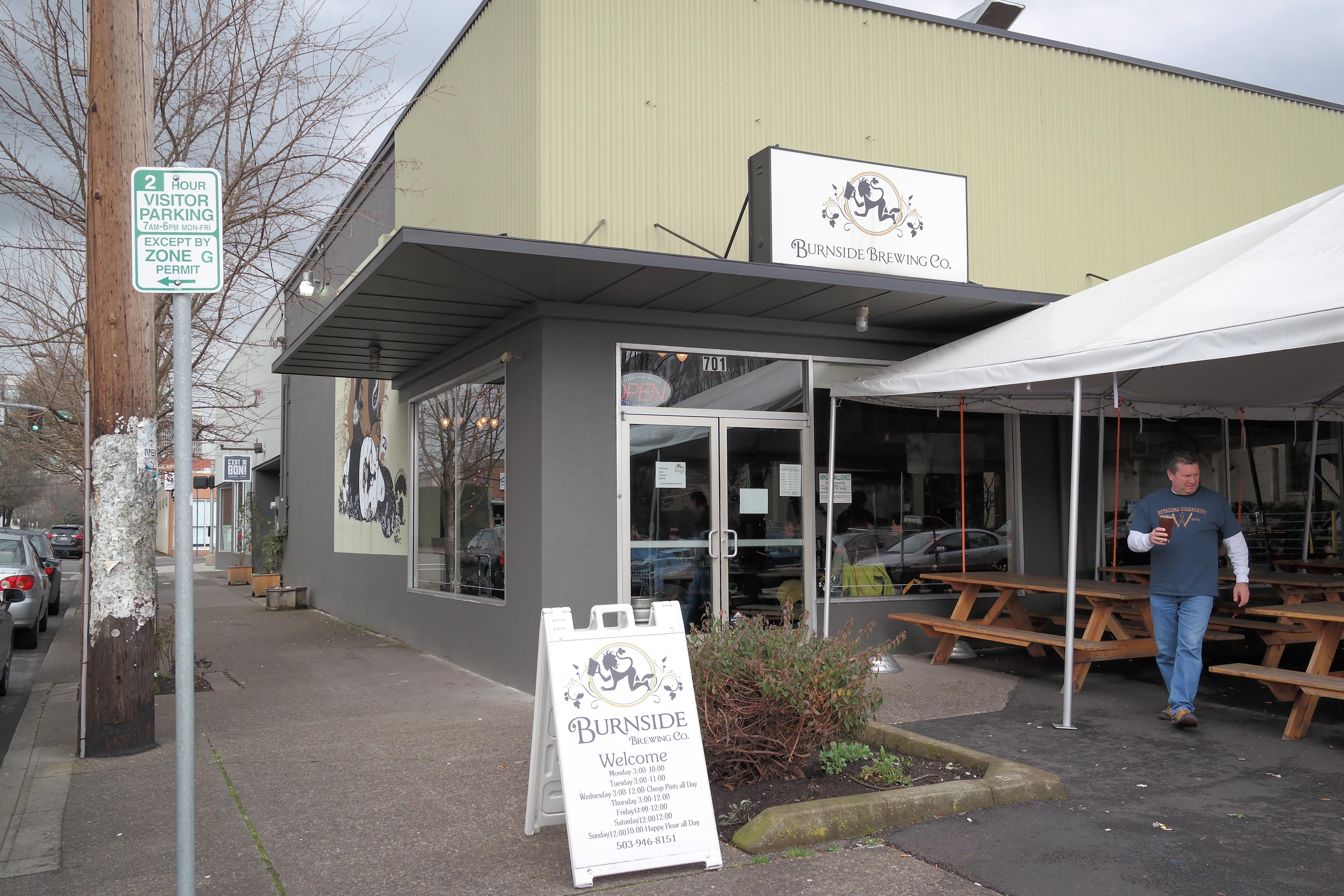
- Exterior of the brewery's pub, 2014
- Location: Portland, Oregon, U.S.
- Opened: 2010

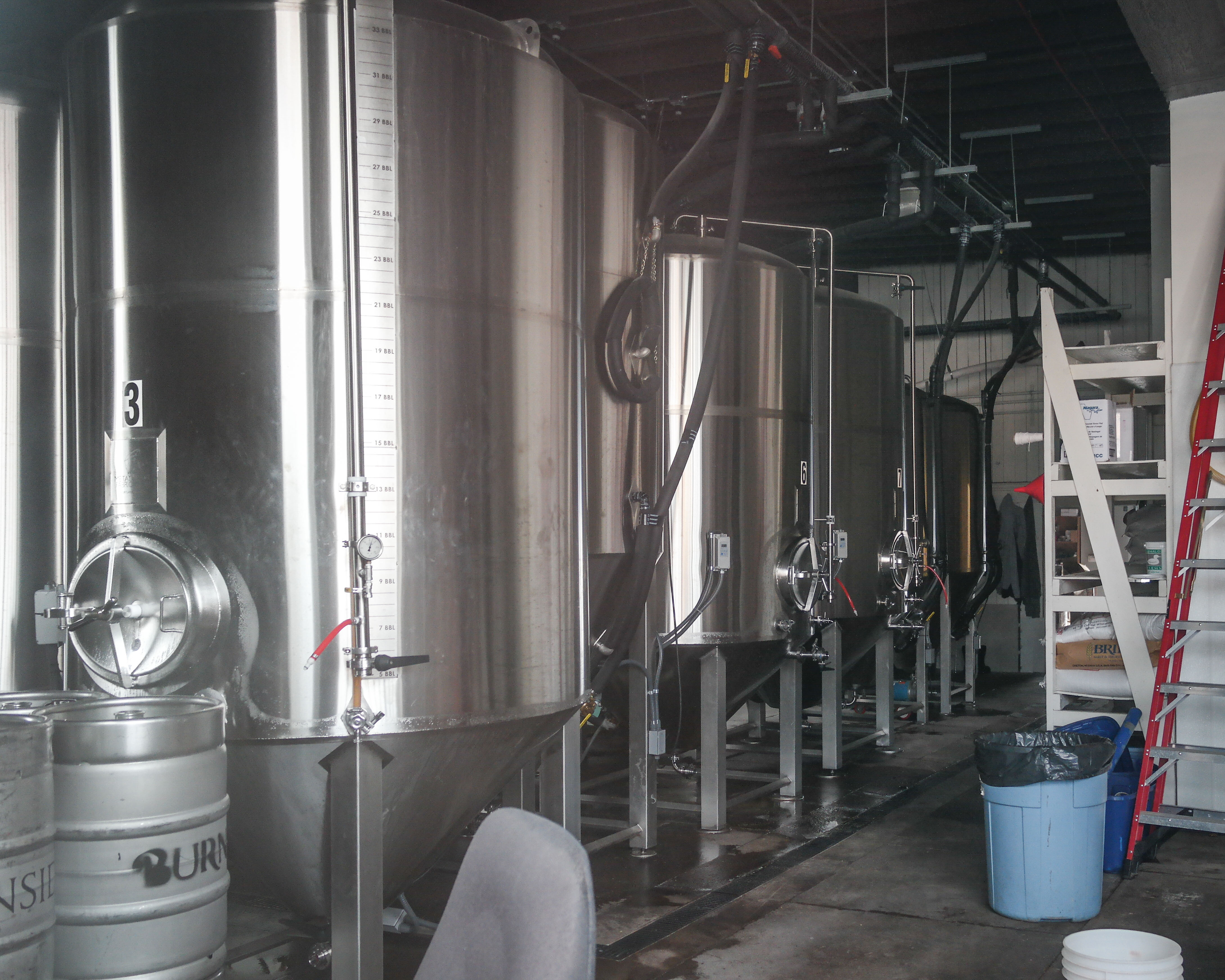
Fermentation tanks

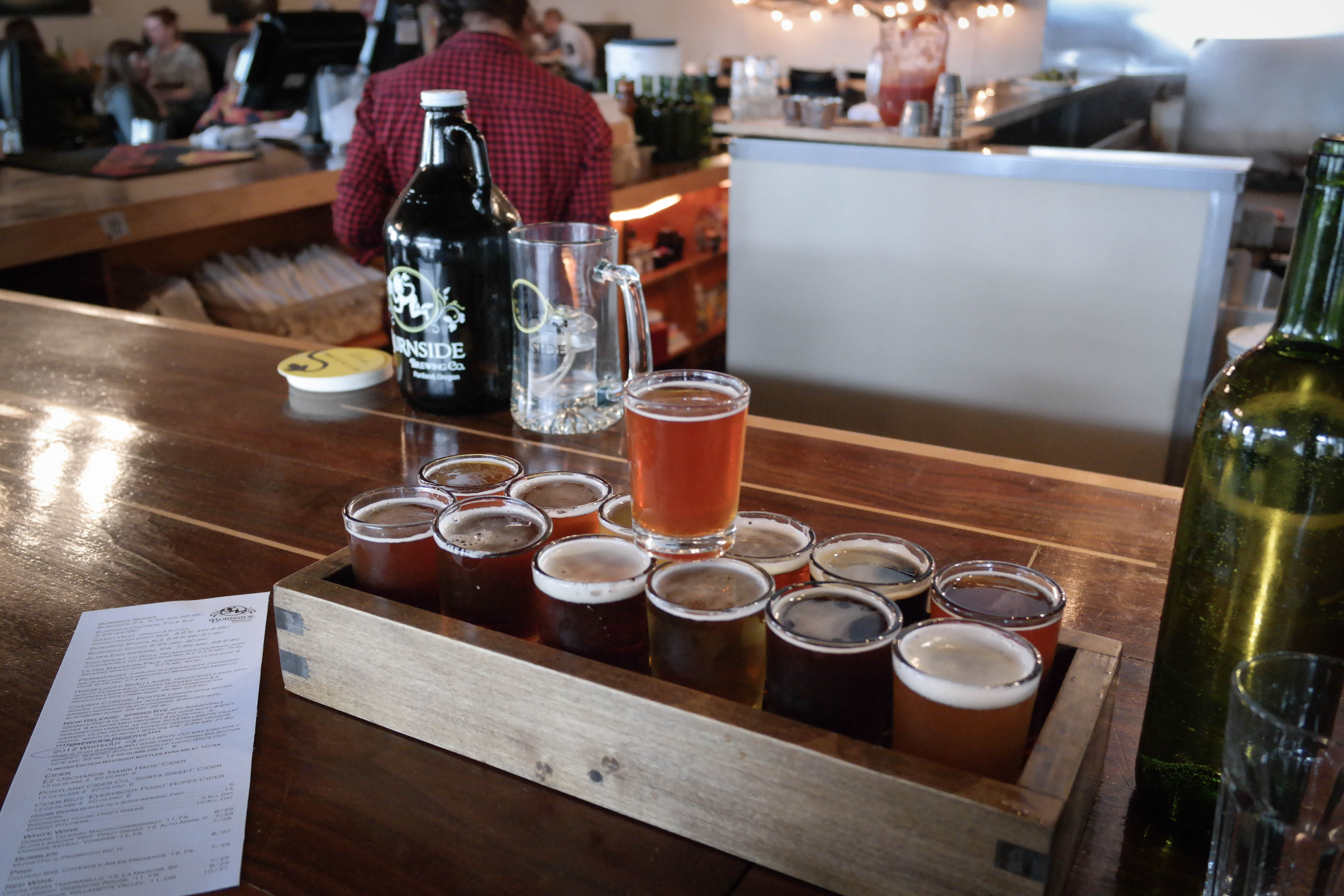
Beer

Burnside Brewing Company was a brewery based in Portland, Oregon.

== History ==
Established in 2010 by Jay Gilbert and Jason McAdam, the company hosted several beer festivals, including the Fruit Beer Festival each June and the Fresh Hop Pop-Up Beer Fest.

Burnside was featured on the television series Man Finds Food in 2015.

The company's pub, located at 701 E. Burnside, closed in 2019.

== Reception ==
Burnside's Sweet Heat apricot wheat ale won gold at the Great American Beer Festival in 2012. In 2017, the company received three medals at the Best of Craft Beer Awards, as well as two Oregon Beer Awards.

Burnside was included in Willamette Week's 2016 lists of "Beer Bars with the Best Happy Hours" and "Portland Bars Where You Can Bring Kids". In 2017, the newspaper's Adrienne So said Burnside's tap list is "like Willie Wonka's fridge", and Martin Cizmar ranked Burnside number three in his list of "The 16 Best Brewery Burgers in Portland". Willamette Week's Matthew Korfage wrote in 2018, "No Other Portland Brewery Does Food Like Burnside".

== See also ==
- Brewing in Oregon
- List of companies based in Oregon
