= Maine Cabin Masters =

American reality TV show

- Genre: Reality television
- Country of origin: United States
- Original language: English
- No. of seasons: 13
- No. of episodes: 177

Production
- Running time: 43 minutes

Original release
- Network: DIY Network (2017–22); Magnolia Network (2022-)
- Release: January 2, 2017 – present

Maine Cabin Masters is a reality television show airing on the Magnolia Network (formerly known as DIY Network) that chronicles the restoration and renovation of cabins in Maine. The show centers on contractor Chase Morrill, his designer sister Ashley Morrill, and her carpenter husband Ryan Eldridge. Also featured in each episode are master carpenters Matt "Dixie" Dix and Jared "Jedi" Baker. It debuted on January 2, 2017, and, as of June 2025, is in its 11th season. Over its first three seasons, it was DIY's highest rated program.

== Premise ==
Each episode begins with Chase introducing Ashley and Ryan to a new cabin—called "camps" in the local parlance—and its owners. Typically, the cabins are in poor shape and badly in need of renovation. A budget and deadline are set. The Cabin Masters then make every attempt to restore these structures, remaining true to their original function, but sometimes adding modern amenities like solar panels and composting toilets. At the end of the episode, the Cabin Masters "reveal" the renovated cabin to its owners and ceremoniously hand over its keys.

Chase is the team's leader, but the work is done collaboratively. As the designer, Ashley chooses paint colors and the like, and seeks objects that are unique to Maine culture—such as tote bags made from old sails.
