= Coming Soon Television =

Italian TV channel

Coming Soon Television was an Italian TV channel dedicated to the world of cinematography.

On 26 March 2014, it was replaced by Fine Living.

== Audience ==
Below, monthly audience issued by AUDITEL

	January	February	March	April	May	June	July	August	September	October	November	December	Year %
2011	0,04%	0,04%	0,04%	0,03%	0,03%	0,04%	0,05%	0,04%	0,03%	0,02%	0,03%	0,03%	0,03%
2012	0,03%	0,03%	0,03%	0,04%	0,04%	0,05%	0,03%	0,02%	0,02%	0,02%	0,03%	0,02%	0,03%
2013	0,02%	0,01%	0,01%	0,01%	0,02%	0,02%	0,02%	0,01%	0,01%	0,01%	0,01%	0,01%	0,02%
2014	0,01%	0,01%											
