= Magnolia Network (Canada) =

Canadian specialty TV channel

- Country: Canada
- Broadcast area: Nationwide
- Headquarters: Toronto, Ontario

Programming
- Picture format: 1080i HDTV (downscaled to letterboxed 480i for the SDTV feed)

Ownership
- Owner: Rogers Sports & Media (branding licensed from Skydance)
- Sister channels: Food Network; HGTV

History
- Launched: October 19, 2009; 17 years ago (Corus Entertainment-owned version); January 1, 2025; 22 months ago (Rogers-owned version)
- Replaced: Fine Living (most providers)
- Closed: December 31, 2024; 22 months ago (Corus Entertainment-owned version)
- Former names: DIY Network (2009–2022)

Links
- Website: Magnolia Network

Magnolia Network is a Canadian exempt discretionary specialty channel owned by the Toronto-based Rogers Sports & Media. Based on the U.S. cable network of the same name, It broadcasts personality-based programming related to home construction, improvement, and cuisine.

The first incarnation of the network was formed in 2009 by CW Media—a joint venture of Canwest and Goldman Sachs Alternatives—as DIY Network. The channel—which was initially licensed as a Category B specialty channel—was based on the U.S. cable network of the same name. Similarly to its U.S. namesake, it served as a sister network to HGTV, with an initial focus on instructional programming relating to "do it yourself" (DIY) activities such as home improvement. It later pivoted to primarily airing reality shows following personalities in the home renovation and construction businesses. Following the lead of its U.S. parent, the channel relaunched as Magnolia Network in March 2022.

In June 2024, Rogers Sports & Media announced that it had acquired the Canadian rights to all Warner Bros. Discovery (WBD) factual and lifestyle brands beginning January 1, 2025. Rogers later announced that it would relaunch Magnolia Network as a new discretionary channel on that date; Corus later announced that its iteration of Magnolia Network would cease operations at midnight ET on January 1, 2025, with the launch of the Rogers iteration of the network occurring shortly thereafter. The channel is legally separate from the Corus-owned iteration of Magnolia Network.

== History ==
=== Corus Entertainment incarnation ===
Alliance Atlantis was granted approval for the channel under the name D.I.Y. Television by the Canadian Radio-television and Telecommunications Commission (CRTC) on November 24, 2000. Under the CRTC's approval, the channel was described as a "service designed for the do-it-yourselfer of all levels... entirely devoted to programs that offer Canadians an interactive television experience that provides immediate access to detailed step by step instructions, in-depth demonstrations, and tips for do-it-yourself projects." The channel, however, was never launched and its licence expired. Alliance Atlantis re-applied for the channel under a Category 2 license, and was approved on October 21, 2005 with an almost identical nature of service description as the original licence granted in 2000.

On January 18, 2008, a joint venture between Canwest and Goldman Sachs Alternatives known as CW Media bought Alliance Atlantis's specialty networks, including the licence for the yet unlaunched D.I.Y. Television.

DIY Network logo from 2009 to 2022.

In late 2009, Canwest announced that it would launch the channel on October 19, 2009 as DIY Network, a Canadian version of the U.S. channel of the same name. On many television service providers, DIY Network replaced Fine Living, which ceased operations the same day. Corus Entertainment initially owned a 12% stake at the channel's launch, but then it later sold its stake to CW Media in February 2010. Programming on the channel was primarily devoted to do it yourself home improvement projects, with the majority of programming consisting of reruns from its sister network, HGTV Canada and licensed programs from the American DIY Network.

On October 27, 2010, Shaw Communications gained control of DIY Network as a result of its acquisition of Canwest and Goldman Sachs' interest in CW Media. A high definition simulcast launched in February 2016. On April 1 of that same year, Corus Entertainment acquired Shaw Media.

In 2019, Discovery, Inc. announced that the American version of DIY Network would relaunched in partnership with Chip and Joanna Gaines of the HGTV series Fixer Upper. In October 2021, the new service—Magnolia Network—was soft-launched in Canada via the local launch of the Discovery+ streaming service (which was backed by Corus). On March 1, 2022, it was announced that DIY Network would relaunch as Magnolia Network on March 28, 2022.

=== Wind-down of operations, relaunch by Rogers ===
In June 2024, Rogers Sports & Media announced it had acquired the rights to all Warner Bros. Discovery factual and lifestyle television brands beginning January 1, 2025, including HGTV and Magnolia Network. Rogers later announced that it would relaunch Magnolia Network as a new discretionary service on that date, along with HGTV and three other WBD brands.

While Corus initially announced plans to relaunch its HGTV channel as Home Network on December 30, 2024, it did not announce any similar plans for the channel licence used by Magnolia. By November 2024, some television providers began to advise their customers that Magnolia Network would be discontinued by Corus at 12:00 a.m. ET on January 1, 2025. As announced, the Corus-owned incarnation of Magnolia Network was shut down at this time. Rogers launched its iteration of Magnolia Network thereafter; this iteration of the service is legally distinct from the Corus-run version, and is believed to currently to be operating under an exempted status pending a formal discretionary license application with the CRTC.

== Programming ==
The network carries a similar array of programming to Magnolia Network in the United States, with a focus on personality-based series relating to home renovation, restoration, and construction.
