= Amy Matthews =

American television personality

- Born: May 19, 1973 (age 52); Robbinsdale, Minnesota
- Occupations: General contractor, TV host
- Known for: host of DIY Network's Sweat Equity and Bathroom Renovations, and HGTV's Renovation Raiders.
- Website: www.amymatthews.com

Amy Matthews, is an American licensed general contractor. More recently, the host of DIY Network's Sweat Equity, Bathroom Renovations, and HGTV's Renovation Raiders.

== Early life ==
Born May 19, 1973, Matthews grew up in Robbinsdale, Minnesota. She got her first taste of home improvement at 14 when she traveled with her church youth group to repair homes for families in need. For the next several years, she tackled similar fix-it-up projects through various organizations.

== Education and career ==
After studying at Boston University and the American Musical and Dramatic Academy in New York City, Matthews returned to her native Minnesota where she worked with the Guthrie Theatre, the Minnesota Opera, Hey City Theatre, Mixed Blood Theatre, and Open Eye Figure Theatre. Amy continued to hone her do it yourself skills with The Family Handyman magazine and became a licensed contractor and home improvement specialist with DIY Network. Her film and television credits include leading roles in four independent feature films and numerous national and regional commercials, notably for 3M Scotch-Blue painter's tape and HomeAdvisor. She serves as the latter's Home Improvement Advisor.

Matthews works with Habitat for Humanity and the Jimmy and Rosalynn Carter Work Project in cities such as New Orleans, Los Angeles, St. Paul, and Chiang Mai, Thailand. In addition to DIY and HGTV, her work has been featured in publications such as Esquire, Country Living, Real Simple, Men's Health, Good Housekeeping, and The New York Times.

In May 2021, This Old House teamed up with Matthews to build her dream home: a modern, Scandinavian-style “barnhouse” in the St. Croix River Valley.
