= Renovation Raiders =

Renovation TV show

Renovation Raiders is a home renovation show on the American television channel HGTV. Its host is Amy Matthews. The premise of the show was to do a major renovation on a family's home in five hours and surprise one of the homeowners.

According to the script, Matthews would work with a family friend to plan the renovation. It would include anything from redoing a family room to a full kitchen remodel. Once the plan was in place and all the materials were ready, she would work with the family friend to plan a night out for the homeowners; usually a show and movie while the crew worked on the house.

The show was created by Scott Seven and Kevin Budzynski, both natives of Grand Rapids, Michigan.
