= Texas Flip N Move =

- Genre: Reality television
- Country of origin: United States
- Original language: English

Production
- Running time: 40 minutes

Original release
- Network: DIY Network
- Release: November 11, 2014 – November 8, 2019

Texas Flip N Move is a show featured on DIY Network.

== Premise ==
The show features professional home renovators who purchase older houses to flip for profit.

Unlike many renovation shows, the renovators only buy and sell houses (not the underlying land). At the initial auction, the renovators can only view the home from the outside and must also factor in costs of moving the house from the original lot to the renovation site. At the renovation site, the teams renovate the houses and sell them at auction. A typical episode consists of two of the teams each buying a house to renovate, with friendly competition as they each try to make more profit than the other team. The houses are usually sold with no land and the sale price normally includes the price of transportation to the buyer's property. Some episodes feature the teams moving houses to empty developments where they've purchased lots to set the houses on before renovation, occasionally putting more than one structure on each lot. In these cases, the land is sold along with the house(s) at the end of the process and the cost of the lot is added to the final tally of costs when calculating the profit. Unlike in similar shows, all of the participants know each other well and appear to all get along, so the episodes mostly depict friendly competition, albeit with some good natured ribbing. Some teams sometimes even help out other teams when asked.

=== Cast ===
- Donna Snow King and Toni Snow Barksdale ("The Snow Sisters") (Season 1-present)
- Randy Martin and Bleu Pride ("The Lone Wolf") (Season 1-present)
- Myers Jackson (the selling auctioneer) (Season 1-present)
- Casey Hester and Catrina Kidd (Seasons 4-present)

From Season 1 to Season 3, Casey, who is Cody's cousin moves houses for the Young Guns. Beginning in Season 3 he takes a more active role and moves and flips houses with the Young Guns. From season 4 onward, Casey partners with Catrina who was previously featured as a contractor for the Snow sisters and they continue on as business partners. Catrina's husband makes occasional appearances to help them out with projects.

- "Gary's Girls" (Season 4-present)

Gary Snow is the brother of Donna and Toni; his four daughters (Donna and Toni's nieces) were featured in a Season 3 episode where they and the Snow Sisters each renovated a shipping container.

- Paige and Raf. (Seasons 6-present)
- Gary and Jerry (Seasons 7-present)
- Cody Biffel (Foreman)
- Cody and Suzi Slay ("The Young Guns") (Seasons 1-3)
- H.D. "Daddy" Snow (occasional appearances)

Daddy Snow is the father of Donna, Gary, and Toni, and the grandfather of Gary's four daughters. In his 80s, he is still active in the house-moving business. He inherited a company created by his father C.A. Snow.

- Steven Goode (Construction Foreman)

== Series overview ==
Season	Episodes	Originally released	
Season	Episodes	First released	Last released
1	9	November 11, 2014	March 6, 2015
2	13	September 18, 2015	December 11, 2015
3	13	January 8, 2016	April 1, 2016
4	13	July 15, 2016	October 7, 2016
5	13	November 25, 2016	March 3, 2017
6	13	April 7, 2017	June 30, 2017
7	13	October 6, 2017	January 12, 2018
8	13	February 2, 2018	June 1, 2018
9	13 + 3 specials	February 23, 2018	August 10, 2018
10	13 + 3 specials	August 17, 2018	November 30, 2018
11	13	December 7, 2018	April 5, 2019
12	TBA	April 12, 2019	TBA

== See also ==
- Louisiana Flip N Move
- Alaska Flip N Move
