= Sweat Equity (TV series) =

Sweat Equity is a television show on the DIY Network that shows home owners performing most of the renovations to their house in order to save money and boost the value of their home. The show is hosted by Amy Matthews who is a licensed contractor and personal trainer.
