= Fine Living (Canadian TV channel) =

- Country: Canada
- Broadcast area: National
- Headquarters: Toronto, Ontario

Ownership
- Owner: CW Media (68.24% & managing partner); Scripps Networks (19.76%); Corus Entertainment (12% & minority partner)

History
- Launched: September 3, 2004; 21 years ago
- Closed: October 19, 2009; 16 years ago
- Replaced by: DIY Network (most providers)

Fine Living was a Canadian pay television channel owned by CW Media (a division of Canwest and GS Capital Partners), Corus Entertainment, and Scripps Networks Interactive.

== Programming ==
Programs on Fine Living originated from five main categories: Design & Décor, Every Day, Favourite Things, Food & Drink and Travel & Adventure.

=== Design & Décor ===
- Catalog This!
- Design Inc.
- Mail Order Makeover
- Neat
- Sarah's House

=== Every Day ===
- Glutton For Punishment
- Made to Order
- Opening Soon
- Time Makeover
- What's Your Time Worth?

=== Favourite Things ===
- American Shopper
- I Want That!
- Real Estate Confidential
- The Shopping Detective
- What You Get for the Money

=== Food & Drink ===
- Dinner Date
- Great Cocktails
- Pairings with Andrea
- Shopping with Chefs
- Simply Wine

=== Travel & Adventure ===
- Home Away From Home
- The Thirsty Traveler
- The Wandering Golfer
- We Live Here
- What You Get For the Money: Vacations

- Note: This is only a partial list of programs listed as of October 2009.

== History ==
Fine Living was licensed by the Canadian Radio-television and Telecommunications Commission (CRTC) on November 24, 2000 as The Luxe Network to Alliance Atlantis. The licence was originally set to expire on April 1, 2003 if the service was not operating by that date. The CRTC gave an extension to November 24, 2004 and by that time The E.W. Scripps Company had purchased a minority interest in the service and on September 3, 2004 the channel launched as Fine Living.

On January 18, 2008, a joint venture between Canwest and GS Capital Partners bought Alliance Atlantis including Alliance Atlantis' interest in Fine Living.

In June 2009, Canwest announced that it would be shutting down Fine Living in the fall of that year. Canwest said that it would launch a Canadian version of the DIY Network for television providers to replace Fine Living with. The channel was eventually shut down on October 19, 2009 with the launch of DIY Network. The channel will become Magnolia Network on March 28, 2022.

== See also ==
- Fine Living (Italy)
- Fine Living Network
