= Take This House and Sell It =

- Genre: Reality renovations, Real Estate,
- Created by: Kimberly Carroll
- Narrated by: Kimberly Carroll
- Theme music composer: Larry Hopkins
- Country of origin: Canada
- Original language: English
- No. of seasons: 6
- No. of episodes: 151

Production
- Executive producer: Kimberly Carroll
- Production locations: Toronto, Ontario, Canada
- Running time: 22 Minutes
- Production company: Berlin Productions

Original release
- Network: W Network
- Release: September 2, 2004 – May 18, 2010

Take This House and Sell It is a Canadian home and renovation reality show that originally ran from September 2, 2004 to May 18, 2010 on the W Network. The show was formerly produced by Grace Productions until Berlin Productions took over, and ran until the show ended.

== Storyline ==
In each episode of "Take This House and Sell It" a designer is chosen to visit a family or couple's home that is having trouble selling. He or she makes comments before meeting with the home owners. Once meeting with the homeowners, the designer humorously criticizes the home owner's home and then dispatches their crew, which includes a painter, a contractor, a handyman and seamstress, and in less than 2 days prepare for a "last chance open house". The designer and crew work hard to give the homeowner's home a good impression in order to get a sale. The show then reveals if the homeowner sold their house or not

== Show format ==
Introduction- the homeowners are introduced along with their home, commonly they would refer a lot of positive features of their house, when the negative features are clearly presented in the show, such as the spycam showing the open house viewer's reactions to the home along with the homeowner's real estate agent pointing out the problems.

Inspection- the designer chosen for the task is seen making his or her way to the home and makes his or her comments on it, the show then shows the home owners presenting their views of pros in their home, while the designer point outs the opposite. The designer then scans the home for any problem, preventing the house of getting any offers, after the full inspection is complete the designer comes out and meets with the homeowners and tour their house once again. The homeowner is asked various questions to see if they can detect the problems in their home and once the meeting is over, the couple makes comments and impressions of what they think of their designer and what they will plan to do.

Renovations- the designer dispatches her crew and starts making plans to the home owner's home. The home owners are expected to help fix their home doing various jobs around their house, various activities included DIY (do it yourself) project that include one of the homeowner and the designer to complete. Then the designer insists the home owner leave and do not return to their house in 2 days as the designer and her crew prepares to finish renovating their house with a budget under $5000.

Grand Opening - after completing the renovations the designer welcomes the home owner back and gives them a grand viewing allowing them to see the changes made in their house. After that the homeowner make their impressions, they then leave as the designer and her crew prepares for a last chance open house. The spycam is once again used, showing the same open house viewers and their reactions along with the home owner's real estates opinions, the tally chart is shown covering the cost for the materials needed to renovate the home and then the house is revealed to either been sold or not.

== Crew ==
=== Host ===
- Kimberly Carroll, Host (2004–2010)

=== Designer ===
- Margaret Doyle White, Designer (2004–2010)
- Glenn Dixon, Designer (2004–2010)
- Glen Peloso, Designer (2004–2010)
- Evelyn Eshun, Designer (2004–2008)
- Frank DiLeo, Contractor
- Greg Houghton, Contractor
- Ashley Patterson, Contractor
- Jenny Greco, Painter

== See also ==
- Property Brothers
- Divine Design
- Love It or List It
- Love It or List It Vancouver
