= Man Finds Food =

American food reality television series

- Also known as: Secret Eats with Adam Richman
- Genre: Food Reality
- Presented by: Adam Richman
- Composers: Audio Network; Pimp Audio
- Country of origin: United States
- Original language: English
- No. of seasons: 2
- No. of episodes: 32

Production
- Executive producers: Matt Sharp; Dan Adler; Adam Richman; Bonnie Biggs
- Editors: Jonathan Lee; Dan Lerner
- Camera setup: Multiple camera
- Running time: 21 minutes
- Production company: Sharp Entertainment

Original release
- Network: 7mate Travel Channel; Cooking Channel
- Release: October 7, 2014 – February 1, 2017

Man Finds Food (later called Secret Eats with Adam Richman) is an American food reality television series that premiered on the Travel Channel on April 1, 2015. The series is hosted by food enthusiast Adam Richman who tracks down secret specialties in cities all over America, and later the planet.

The show was scheduled to debut July 2, 2014, with episodes airing every Wednesday night at 9:00 pm ET, but Travel Channel delayed the program indefinitely after Richman posted crude messages on his Instagram account in response to people criticizing a hashtag he had used in one of his pictures. It was unknown when and if the show would air. The show page reappeared on the Travel Channel's website and ultimately premiered at 9:00 pm ET on April 1, 2015, with two back-to-back episodes ("Incognito in Escondido" and "Chi-Town Franken-Sandwich").

Despite the delay on Travel Channel, Australian channel 7mate broadcast the first episode of the series on October 7, 2014. They also ran promotional advertising for the show within the Seven Network group of channels. The station has listed the episode as the first in a 3-episode series. The episodes were available on the Plus7 catchup service after a placeholder page for the show was created on the service.

For Season 2, the show's name was changed to Secret Eats with Adam Richman. The first episode aired on August 8, 2016 on the Travel Channel.

== Premise ==
=== Man Finds Food ===
For season one, Adam Richman travels the United States in a food quest to discover culinary secrets of the more unusual and delicious specialties at eating establishments in each city he visits. He delves deeper by exposing their off-menu hidden dishes and what he calls "off-the-grid" restaurants which even the locals don't know about.

=== Secret Eats with Adam Richman ===
In season two the focus shifts to different countries around the world, but the basic premise of "secret" menus and little-known eateries is maintained. Due to the global nature of each episode, Richman has local guides who support him and the crew, offering commentary on the history of each location. Season 2 also saw Richman engage more with the film crew and involve them in conversation on-camera than had been the case for season 1.

== Episodes ==
=== Season 1 (2014–2015) ===
No.	Title	Location	Original air date (Australia)	Original air date (United States)
1.1	"Behind The Bookcase"	Austin, Texas	October 7, 2014	June 10, 2015
For the premiere of Man Finds Food, Adam Richman and his camera crew explore Austin, Texas to look for some of its best secret food finds with off-menu items. Stops include: Frank in the Warehouse District for eats on a "Friends & Family" secret menu, which includes jalapeño chicken waffle fries and the "Frank Breakfast" (a sweet kolache bun flash-fried, dusted with powdered sugar, and loaded up with hash browns, onions, crumbled sausage, scrambled eggs, and crispy bacon), Firehouse Lounge, located behind a bookcase inside the Firehouse Hostel in Downtown, for a sandwich called "The Lieutenant" (soppressata and bucheron cheese with partially sun-dried tomatoes loaded onto a baguette, drizzled with Balsamic reduction, oven-toasted, and topped with brown mustard), Casino El Camino on 6th Street for the "Tony Randall" (a large burger topped with cheddar and pepper jack cheeses, crispy bacon, shredded lettuce, stewed tomato and a fried egg, all smothered with homemade queso and spicy Texas chili, and also using a grilled cheese-and-bacon sandwich as the bottom bun), and the Mighty Cone food truck in West Campus for the secret "Monster" cone (a grilled tortilla loaded up with one fried shrimp (for the bottom, making for a "shrimp surprise"), a "Hot & Crunchy" chicken patty (coated with corn flakes, red chili flakes, crushed almonds, sesame seeds and flour), a breaded and deep-fried avocado, slaw, and ancho-chile sauce, all loaded into a portable paper cone).
1.2	"Harbour Hideaway & Lobster Garage"	Boston, Massachusetts	October 14, 2014	May 20, 2015
Adam journeys through the big New England city of Boston in search of its secret food finds and off-menu items. Stops include: Al's Deli, located inside the unused Wan Convenience Store in Mission Hill, for the secret "Hush" sandwich (ingredients vary per customer's aura and is never the same twice: Adam's sandwich features his "spirit meats" of turkey, roast beef, and mortadella, plus teriyaki sauce, secret spices, coleslaw, and cranberry sauce); KO Pies in the shipyards of East Boston for the "Lamb Shank Pie" (an Australian meat pie featuring North African-spiced Australian lamb that is braised in tomato sauce, red wine and beef stock for 3 hours, then mixed with blanched vegetables of carrots, green beans and peas, and gravy in a crust topped with mashed potatoes, mushy boiler peas, and more gravy; the end result of the dish is a pie floater); Alive and Kicking, located in the basement of a house in nearby Cambridge, for the "lobster on lobster" (fresh steamed lobster topped with chopped lobster salad, which is seasoned with salt, pepper and held together with mayonnaise); and Bogie's Place, an "adults-only" steakhouse secretly located through a velvet red curtain in the back of famed burger establishment JM Curley in Downtown Boston, for a 20-ounce ribeye steak sauteed with rendered marrow oil in a pastrami rub of brown sugar, black pepper, coriander, smoked paprika and mustard seed, and served with roasted bone marrow and torched foie gras butter plated with carrot puree, charred scallions, and a caramelized clove of garlic.
1.3	"Shaken, Not Stirred"	Milwaukee, Wisconsin	October 21, 2014	May 27, 2015
Adam makes his way through the Midwestern city of Milwaukee to find its best secret food finds and off-menu items. Stops include: the Wisconsin Cheese Mart in Westown for the "Cheese Mart Sweep" (a grilled cheese sandwich that is customized with five different Wisconsin cheeses of one's choosing: Adam's sandwich features Bon Bree Brick, garlic cheddar, Dunbarton Blue, spicy Colby-Jack, and wild morel and leek Jack cheeses, along with sun-dried tomatoes, macaroni and cheese, and garlic aioli); Underground Ramen-Ya, located inside Ardent restaurant on the East Side (and only after hours on Fridays and Saturdays) for authentic Japanese tonkotsu ramen soup (which takes 13 to 15 hours to prepare; the broth is made from four cuts of meat, which include chicken feet, two kinds of mushroom, garlic, ginger, carrots, scallion, leeks, white onion, anchovies, bonito and taray, thin ramen noodles are added and topped with a soft-boiled egg); Shah Jee's Pakistani Cuisine, located inside an office building in Downtown, for authentic Pakistani food including lentils and chickpeas (chana masala) squirted with a spicy "green sauce", made with green peppers, cilantro, salt and cumin seeds, plus chicken masala topped with a gravy made with ginger, garlic, onions, and a curry spice blend of crushed peppers, turmeric powder and coriander powder; and Safe House, a spy-themed restaurant hidden behind a bookcase inside International Exports Ltd. in East Town, for the "Spy Burger" (a 1/2-pound short rib, chuck patty with various toppings known as "covers": Adam's burger features a "green cover" - spinach and artichokes mixed with a boursin cheese dip, plus caramelized onions and bacon on grilled ciabatta).
1.4	"Chi-Town Franken-Sandwich"	Chicago, Illinois	October 28, 2014	April 1, 2015
Adam is in the Windy City to search for Chicago's secret food finds and off-menu items. Stops include: Scofflaw in Logan Square for the "Guapahosa" ("a fun or out-going woman", only 5 served daily: a supersized torta filled with 12 different menu items: two grilled mustard-seared beef patties topped with chicken liver mousse, avocado, fried green tomatoes, pork cheek, cheese, caramelized onions and pickled vegetable salad on Mexican telera bread); Phil's Last Stand in Ukrainian Village for a Shrimp Po'Boy (secret-spiced buttermilk panko-fried shrimp topped with melted cheddar cheese, pickles, tomatoes, coleslaw and shoestring fries between French bread); A Tavola in West Town for the "Italian Meat and Potatoes" (3-pound bone-in grilled ribeye served with homemade gnocchi in brown butter and sage); and La Sirena Clandestina ("The Hidden Mermaid") in Fulton Market District for the "Size Me Up" (Brazilian-style grilled meat plate, usually customized to a person's own taste; Adam's plate includes chicken thighs, short ribs, linguiça sausage, hanger steak, sweet breads, and chicken hearts).
1.5	"Golden Gate Loco Moco"	San Francisco, California	November 4, 2014	April 8, 2015
Adam explores the San Francisco Bay Area for its best secret food finds and off-menu items. Stops include: the Boxing Room in Hayes Valley for the secret "French Fry Po' Boy" (locally-baked Vietnamese Banh Mi bread filled with triple-fried Russet potatoes, bacon-giblet gravy and melted cheddar cheese); Namu Gaji in the Mission District, San Francisco of Dolores Park for the off-the-menu Loco Moco (a chuck-and-short rib burger served with two fried eggs on top of fried sushi rice mixed with hot dogs, bacon, and kimchi, all drenched in a dashi gravy that is seasoned with tamari, bonito, and Parmesan cheese); Little Skillet in SoMa Tech for the "Eggs McMahon" (two homemade Belgian-style square waffles topped with two sunny-side-up eggs, shredded cheddar cheese, sausage gravy, and green onions); and Starbelly in the Castro District for the "Doc's Way Burger" (known to be a top hangover cure: a Prather ranch burger topped with chicken-liver pâté and onion marmalade).
1.6	"Incognito in Escondido"	Los Angeles, California	November 11, 2014	April 1, 2015
Adam searches for LA's secret food finds with off-menu items. Stops include: Escondite ("Hidden") in Skid Rokio for a sandwich called "Godzilla Destroys Skid Rokio" (secret-spiced New York strip steak topped with grilled onions, mushrooms and melted provolone, deep-fried hash browns, applewood bacon and two eggs over easy with vegetarian gravy and Mexican hot sauce on Chicago-style bread); Greenspan's Grilled Cheese in Fairfax for the "Inside Out" (award-winning grilled cheese sandwich, "The Champ", flipped inside out and featuring: taleggio, apricot caper puree, arugula, sun-dried tomatoes, and braised short rib meat between raisin walnut bread); Cha Cha Chili in Alhambra for the "Lomo Burrito" (Korean-marinade short ribs, stir-fried rice, fries, sautéed onions, red bell peppers, tomato, garlic and cilantro topped with secret "Lomo sauce"); and Jitada Thai Restaurant in East Hollywood for the "Jazz Burger" (which must be ordered 24 hours in advance: a huge beef patty in Thai palm sugar secret sauce topped with peppers, onions and Thai chilies, garnished with tomatoes, onion, Thai basil and secret dressing served on a bed of lettuce, with no bun).
1.7	"The Food Abides"	Oahu, Hawaii	November 16, 2014	April 15, 2015
Adam and his crew pay a visit to the beautiful Hawaiian island of Oahu for its best secret food finds and off-menu items. Stops include: Aiea Bowl, a bowling alley in Aiea which features a secret "Tasty Tuesday" 5-course prix fixe meal (the menu for this episode features tomato-and-mirepoix-braised short ribs with Potatoes au gratin); The Pig & The Lady in Chinatown for the off-the-menu "Mushroom Godzilla" (a massive sandwich featuring one sharp cheddar-stuffed mushroom cap and one roasted bell pepper-stuffed mushroom cap, both breaded with panko and dehydrated rice, fried and topped with chimichurri sauce, dehydrated mushroom dust, beer-vinegar slaw, slow-roasted Vietnamese phở-spiced beef brisket, and a housemade Russian dressing featuring tamarind, ketchup, mayonnaise, pickles, and fish sauce); J.J. Dolan's (also in Chinatown), an Irish pub featuring the "Drunken Duck Pizza" (Guinness stout pizza dough topped with Chinese roasted duck, whole-milk mozzarella, red and white cabbage, Maui sweet onions sautéed in Jameson Irish whiskey, goat cheese, Chinese parsley, cilantro, a fried Hawaiian duck egg, and deep-fried duck skin, all squirted with a secret sauce); and Town in Kaimuki for the off-the-menu Pa'i'ai (a secret dish that was once deemed illegal because of a rumor of food-borne illnesses: a boiled and pounded Taro root that is sliced, pan-fried in butter, and served with a different meat every day; Adam's Pa'i'ai was served with grass-fed ribeye steak and roasted vegetables).
1.8	"Down & Dirty in Atlanta"	Atlanta, Georgia	November 18, 2014	May 13, 2015
Adam and his crew check out various eateries in Atlanta, one of the biggest cities in the South, to discover their best secret food finds and off-menu items. Stops include: Daddy D'z BBQ Joynt in Southeast Atlanta for slow-smoked ribs and a popular appetizer called "Que Wraps" (oak and hickory-smoked pulled pork placed inside wonton wraps, deep-fried and served with a sweet barbecue dipping sauce); ¡Bad Dog! Taquería in Emory Village (near the campus of Emory University, where Adam had gone to college) for the "Mac Daddy" taco (only 40 of them made per day: a 9-inch tortilla rolled with 10 ingredients: cumin, ancho chili, salt, cayenne, garlic, red onion, cilantro, oven-roasted tomato, salsa and hot sauce, then grilled and loaded with baked four-cheese macaroni and cheese (made with cavatappi curly noodles) and crumbled chorizo); Two Urban Licks in the Old Fourth Ward for wood-fired Georgia quail (only available on weekends on a secret menu with a constantly-rotating selection: quail marinated in rosemary, crushed garlic, olive oil, and thyme, seasoned with salt & pepper and grilled on a three-story rotisserie at 1,000 degrees F, served with butter-poached radishes, grilled endives and radicchio, and fresh watercress, and drizzled with a sherry duck sauce); and Yeah! Burger in Virginia-Highland for the "Dirty South" burger (two 3-ounce local grass-fed beef patties made from sirloin, brisket and chuck topped with pimento cheese (made from yellow and white cheddar, Swiss cheese, provolone, pimentos, mayo, cayenne and hot sauce), house-made beef & kidney bean chili, and slices of raw jalapeño pepper).
1.9	"Magic School Bus"	Portland, Oregon	November 23, 2014	June 17, 2015
Adam samples the best secret food finds and off-menu items in the "City of Roses", the Pacific Northwest's Portland, Oregon. Stops include: The Grilled Cheese Grill in the Alberta Arts District for the off-the-menu "Alyson", which starts off with a "Gabby" sandwich (four-cheese grilled cheese with Tillamook Cheddar, Colby Jack, Swiss and Mozzarella), then adds a fried egg, Braeburn apple slices, and potato chips inside the sandwich; The Fried Onion, hidden in the Industrial District and inspired by New York street food that enforces a surcharge for Boston Red Sox fans, for the "Moussa" (a sandwich with Buffalo chicken, pastrami, grilled onions, pickled peppers, Muenster cheese, and a secret mayonnaise-based sauce on an onion roll); Burnside Brewing Co. in Lower Burnside for the off-menu Caribbean-inspired "Ultimate Burger" (only 30 made per day: beef patty on a flat-top grill browned in duck fat, topped with pork belly cooked in jerk seasoning made with veal reduction, butter-poached lobster meat, mango chutney, micro greens, and special sauce of sea-urchin aioli); and Kenny & Zuke's Delicatessen in Downtown Portland for a secret menu item called the "Jeremy" (macaroni and cheese with four different cheeses: cheddar, Swiss, blue cheese and Pecorino, topped with 10-hour smoked and 2-hour steamed pastrami, chopped tomatoes, and diced & sauteed zucchini).
1.10	"Tweet Secrets"	Nashville, Tennessee	November 23, 2014	May 6, 2015
Adam explores Music City U.S.A. to discover its best secret food finds and off-menu items. Stops include: Pepperfire in East Nashville for the "Apple Jack" (dry-rubbed Nashville hot chicken placed on top of a panko-breaded, deep-fried "pepper-cheese sandwich" (a grilled cheese sandwich featuring pepper jack cheese, with the bread slathered with mayonnaise) and topped with stewed apples; of the "Six Levels of Heat" available in the restaurant, Adam chose the third-hottest level, "Hot", for his chicken); Gabby's Burgers & Fries in Wedgewood-Houston for the "Big CC Dog" (found only on the "secret menu": a 5-ounce butterflied and grilled hot dog topped with melted cheddar and Swiss cheeses, cream cheese, and a creamy homemade chili made with jalapeño juice); Mason's Southern Provisions at the Loews Vanderbilt Hotel in Midtown for the "Liquid Nitrogen Coke Float" (a special ice cream soda made with vanilla ice cream base prepared with liquid nitrogen, topped with cola, Chantilly cream and peanut clusters with marshmallow and chocolate, and doused in even more liquid nitrogen; this treat can only be obtained by following the executive chef on social media and uttering a secret password of his choosing to your server); and Pinewood Social in Rolling Mill Hill for their secret chicken and waffles (featuring pressure-fried chicken, breaded with rice flour and spiced with Korean chili powder, served on top of homemade buckwheat waffles).
1.11	"Made Man Meals"	Las Vegas, Nevada	November 25, 2014	April 8, 2015
Adam and his crew take a drive down the Las Vegas strip to find its tastiest secret food finds and off-menu items. Stops include: Capo's Italian Steakhouse on Sahara Avenue for "The Leftovers" (a sandwich of sausage and meatballs topped with garlic, onions, and mushrooms ("bust-a-caps"), plus "Capone Sauce" - a tomato sauce using Al Capone's original recipe - as well as shredded cheese, two fried eggs, and a rustic bruschetta topping, all between toasted ciabatta bread); the Park on Fremont (named for its location on Fremont Street in Downtown) for deep-fried lobster sliders topped with melted cheese and pineapple-chipotle slaw, all served between two bacon, mozzarella and provolone-filled potato pancakes, and a side of Park's Smothered Garbage Fries (fries topped with shredded cheese, cheese sauce, bacon, sour cream, chipotle aioli, green onions, tomatoes, and homemade guacamole), The Pizzeria at the Cosmopolitan Hotel for a slice of white pizza with mozzarella, parmesan and ricotta cheeses, plus garlic oil, all made on an 8-year-old sourdough starter crust; and Jamms in Westside for the "Jamminator" (a sandwich of fried corned beef, sauerkraut and a 5-egg omelet, all inside deep-fried pretzel-bread French toast).
1.12	"Knot Your Average Food"	New Orleans, Louisiana	November 27, 2014	April 22, 2015
Adam checks out the "Big Easy" - New Orleans, Louisiana - to find the best of its secret food finds and off-menu items. Stops include: Parkway Bakery and Tavern in Mid-City for the "James Brown" (named on this very episode; a po' boy sandwich featuring Leidenheimer bread loaded with fried shrimp, slow-barbecued beef (which includes grape jelly in the barbecue sauce), melted pepper jack cheese, more barbecue sauce, lettuce, tomatoes, pickles and mayonnaise); Pizza Delicious in the Bywater for "Garlic Knot-chos" (homemade garlic knots oven-baked and topped with garlic butter, parmesan cheese, parsley, homemade raw pizza sauce, pickled jalapeños, and shredded mozzarella cheese - then baked in the oven again and topped with more parsley, parmesan and jalapeños), then a stop at SnoWizard SnoBall Shoppe located Uptown, where Adam treated his crew to homemade "sno-balls", a New Orleans treat of shaved ice flavored with sugar cane syrup, before the next secret spot at Bayou Hot Wings in Uptown (Adam's all-time favorite place for wings) for pepper-jelly wings (chicken wings cooked with a sauce of red and green bell peppers, jalapeño peppers, cayenne, black pepper, parsley and red pepper flakes, all mixed together with sugar and vinegar); and McClure's Barbecue on Magazine Street for redfish on the half-shell (spice-rubbed redfish that is smoked "on the half shell", or in its own skin, and topped with jumbo lump blue crab, lemon-and-garlic-flavored clarified butter, and fresh parsley, chives, and mint).
1.13	"City of Brotherly Grub"	Philadelphia, Pennsylvania	December 4, 2014	June 3, 2015
The "City of Brotherly Love", Philadelphia, Pennsylvania, is Adam's next destination to find tasty secret food finds and off-menu items. Stops include: PYT (Pretty Yummy Thing) in North Liberties for the "Chicken and Beer Burger" (a ground chicken patty topped with a "beer wonton" - a frozen beer shot wrapped in wontons, then coated with a mixture of panko bread crumbs and potato chips, and deep fried - plus pimento cheese spread, pickled green tomato, lettuce and tomato, all on a butter-grilled brioche bun); National Mechanics, a bank-turned-restaurant in Old City, for the off-menu "Chili Frito Pie" (a bed of Fritos corn chips topped with beef chili, melted Oaxaca cheese, and the secret "cilantro salad" - a mixture of pico de gallo, avocado, and cilantro); Federal Donuts in Center City for Korean fried chicken twice-fried in a secret dill pickle glaze, and a "Belshaw Donut Robot Mark II"-made cake donut dipped in a honey-lemon glaze; and The Ranstead Room, secretly located in the basement next to Mexican restaurant El Rey in Rittenhouse Square, for the "Albondigas" sandwich (Mexican-style beef meatballs mixed with bread crumbs and Mexican rice, then cooked in a Mexican marinara sauce of tomatoes, onions, mint, and chipotle and guajillo peppers, and placed inside of a toasted baguette lined with goat cheese).
1.14	"Secret Super Bowl Snacks"	New York, New York	December 11, 2014	April 29, 2015
In this Super Bowl-themed episode, Adam scours his native New York City for secret treats in restaurants that feel like home to fans of various NFL teams; this episode was filmed before Super Bowl XLVIII, which took place in the New York City metro area. Stops include: Philadelphia Eagles establishment Wogies Bar & Grill in the West Village for a cheesesteak prepared with onions, cherry peppers, sweet peppers, and double Cheez Whiz on a soft pretzel roll; Denver Broncos fan favorite Little Town in Union Square for a carnival-style funnel cake (topped with vanilla ice cream, coulis made from blueberries, strawberries and blackberries, and powdered sugar); Cleveland Browns establishment Manny's on Second on the Upper East Side for "Polish Boy Tot-chos" (deep-fried tater tots topped with crumbled sweet Italian sausage, Asian coleslaw, homemade buffalo sauce, and shredded cheese); and Chicago Bears haven The Overlook in Midtown East for an off-the-menu Italian beef sandwich (only served during Bears games: thinly-sliced roast beef drenched in au jus and topped with pickles, giardiniera, and hot peppers). NFL stars DeSean Jackson (Philadelphia), Von Miller (Denver), Chris Ogbonnaya (Cleveland), and brothers Martellus (Chicago) and Michael Bennett (Seattle) made special guest appearances in this episode, as well as American Idol alumni Ace Young and Diana DeGarmo (during the segment filmed at Little Town).
1.15	"NYC Steak-Easy"	New York, New York	December 18, 2014	June 24, 2015
Adam searches for the best secret food finds and off-menu items inside establishments throughout his hometown of New York City. Stops include: the secret second floor of Tre Dici Steak in Chelsea for the "Valdostana" (only five served each night: a veal chop seasoned with kosher salt and black pepper, pan-seared, topped with shredded Fontina cheese, spinach, garlic and prosciutto, and doused in a Marsala wine demi-glace); El Sabroso, hidden inside a loading dock in the Garment District in Midtown, for Peruvian-style roast pork rice & beans (featuring pork marinated in a blend of bell peppers, onions, celery, garlic and cilantro, and roasted pernil-style, before being pulled and served over yellow rice and beans with a homemade hot sauce and a side salad); Cienfuegos in Alphabet City for "ropa vieja" (Spanish for "old clothes"; Cuban-style short rib coated in spices of salt, black pepper, fennel, anise, cumin, coriander and mustard seed, pan-seared with cloves of garlic and mirepoix, then braised in red wine, chicken stock, rosemary and thyme, and served over a cauliflower purée while topped with shallot strings and pumpkin seeds); and Sugar and Plumm on the Upper West Side for the off-the-menu "Upper West Sliders" (sliders featuring boneless short ribs braised in root beer, then sliced and flattop-seared, and topped with caramelized onions, blue cheese, and jalapeño jam).

=== Season 2 (2016–2017) ===
Note: For this season, the show was renamed Secret Eats with Adam Richman.

No.	Title	Location	Original release date
2.1	"Undercover 'Que"	London, England	August 8, 2016
This season, Adam and his crew travel the world uncovering secret eats; their first city on this tour is London. Stops include: Evans & Peel, a speakeasy in Earl's Court disguised as a detective agency, for the "Mac & Cheese with Bacon and Truffle" (a macaroni and cheese dish prepared with spiral macaroni, a thick cheddar cheese sauce, cream, secret herbs and spices, shredded Swiss cheese and brioche bread crumbs, then sprinkled with crumbled bacon and drizzled with truffle oil); Stax, an American-style eatery in Kingly Court in Soho, for the "Nutella Duffin Sundae" (a dessert concoction featuring a fried "duffin" (part donut, part muffin) that is spiced with nutmeg and vanilla and coated in sugar, split and topped with Nutella, homemade vanilla ice cream, more Nutella, homemade whipped cream, butterscotch and chocolate fudge sauces, and a Ferrero Rocher chocolate--this item (and any other item found on Stax's secret menu) can only be obtained if the customer dances for it first); the Disappearing Dining Club, a pop-up restaurant that frequently changes locations; in this episode, it is found within LASSCO Salvage Warehouse, an antiques store located within the Ropewalk in Bermondsey, and there Adam tries the "Maltby Street Smoked Salmon" (gravlax salmon cured with salt and sugar, chilled for 24 hours, and smoked in a pot with Applewood smoke dust; it is then placed on rye bread with a lemon crème fraîche and topped with pickled cucumber, dill, and watercress); and Bodean's BBQ, also in Soho, for the off-menu "Brunch Bap" (only 12 served per day: a large sandwich consisting of burnt ends (from brisket that is flown in from Kansas), homemade maple-glazed bacon, sliced Texas-style sausage, melted Provolone cheese, and a fried egg, sprinkled with barbecue seasoning and topped with hickory barbecue sauce, all inside of a buttered and grilled bap).
2.2	"Raising the Steaks"	Buenos Aires, Argentina	August 8, 2016
Adam travels to Buenos Aires to find off-menu secret eats. Stops include: Victoria Brown, a steampunk-style speakeasy in Palermo Soho, named after Queen Victoria and claimed lover John Brown, where he gets "Spicy French Toast", pan de campo (rustic bread) soaked in a batter of egg and crushed red pepper, fried and topped with scallion cream cheese, ham, avocado, mozzarella, Dijon mustard, Parmesan cheese, and a fried egg, and dusted with chili powder; tries the asado or "whole cow" of chori-pan (chorizo on bread) and morci-pan (morcilla blood sausage on bread), traditional Argentinian barbecue in a hidden parrilla with no name in Mercado San Telmo, along with the "Matambrito a la Pizza", flank steak layered with tomatoes, queso cremoso and local oregano, made to look like a pizza; eats at Pan Y Teatro ("Bread and Theater") in Boedo for their Mendocinian dish, "Carbonada en Zapallo", a mixed top round steak, fruit, and vegetable stew (prepared with a mixture of milk and honey) inside a hollowed-out pumpkin; and has slow-cooked lamb with pickled vegetables and lamb-fat mashed potatoes, garnished with harissa-spiced cauliflower and black olive-tomato purees as well as a grilled leek, at Casa SaltShaker in Recoleta, a "puertas cerradas" (or "closed-door") restaurant where a chef opens his home to cook for his guests.
2.3	"Riverfront Hideaways"	Bangkok, Thailand	August 15, 2016
Adam and his crew visit Bangkok, the most populous city in Thailand, to seek out their best secret dishes with waterfront views. Stops include: Steve Café & Cuisine, a riverside eatery in the Dusit district with a no-shoes policy, for Southern Thai-style cuisine including their yellow curry fish, featuring fresh sea bass stewed in a homemade yellow curry (made from lemongrass, lime juice, garlic, turmeric, and northern Thai chilies) along with vegetable stock, fish sauce, more lime juice (half from yellow limes and half from green limes), local palm sugar, lotus root, and southern shrimp paste; Rung Rat Boat Noodle, nestled inside the Rangsit floating market in the Thanyaburi district (40 miles north of Bangkok), for a dish of thin boat noodles mixed with blanched greens and bean sprouts, marinated pork, meatballs, minced pork, stewed pork, peanuts, scallions and local herbs, all inside of the restaurant's secret broth (which includes a tablespoon of pig's blood mixed in); River Tree House, hidden past narrow alleyways near houses and temples in the Nonthaburi province and situated on top of the Chao Phraya River, for their "Fried Mullet with Mango", featuring a fresh mullet deep-fried in oil for 8 minutes then topped with a sauce which combines dried Thai chili, fish sauce, syrup, lime juice, smoked fresh Thai chili, chili oil, lemongrass, basil, mint, fresh mango, and kaffir lime leaves, and garnished with more mango, mint and dried Thai chili; and Uncle Pa Pad Thai in the Old City neighborhood of Ghost Gate for their secret Italian-fusion "Spaghetti Pad Thai", a Western twist on Thailand's famous noodle dish, featuring spaghetti cooked in a hot wok with a mixture of oil, dissolved shrimp brains, fish sauce, red onion, yellow tofu, chili powder, sugar, green onion, bean sprouts, and brine shrimp.
2.4	"Stroganoff Secrets"	Moscow, Russia	August 15, 2016
Adam hunts for the best secret menu items in Russia's capital and Europe's largest city, Moscow. Stops include: Syrovarnya, an Italian-style cheese-making factory and eatery in the Dorogomilovo District, where he tries focaccia topped with tomatoes and burrata cheese, as well as their signature beef Stroganoff, featuring chopped onions, garlic, and mushrooms all grilled together and mixed with sautéed beef tenderloin and boiled potatoes, then drenched in a demi-glace and topped with 33%-fat cream, and left to chill (to make the beef even more tender) before getting sprinkled with parsley and shredded Russian cheese and then reheated in the oven to melt the cheese; Petrovich, a Soviet-era speakeasy and dining club in the Basmanny District named for a Russian comic book character, for their "chicken tkemali", featuring deboned and pounded chicken fried in a pan with olive oil, sprinkled with fresh garlic, and served with pickled vegetables and a tart Georgian-style plum sauce; Molon Lave ("come and get it") in the Presnensky District for the off-menu "kleftikos", goat leg meat rubbed in extra virgin olive oil, white wine, thyme, rosemary, fresh oregano and lemon juice, laid on a bed of fresh herbs, vegetables and crumbled spicy cheese, and wrapped in parchment before being roasted for 3 1/2 hours; and Chestnaya Kukhnya ("Honest Kitchen", also in the Basmanny District), a restaurant where the chef serves meats from animals that he hunts and kills himself, with today's off-menu item being a roe ragù, featuring the meat seared in olive oil, thyme, salt, pepper and garlic, sweetened with dried roses and dates, simmered with red wine and sour pomegranate molasses, and mixed with various fruits and vegetables, toasted garlic bulbs, fennel, fresh morel mushrooms, quince, and medlar, all served inside of a copper pot.
2.5	"Under the Radar Rome"	Rome, Italy	August 22, 2016
Adam travels to Rome, Italy to uncover the ancient city's culinary secrets. Stops include: Sora Margherita Al Borghetto in the castle-walled town of Ostia Antica for Rome's most well-known pasta dish, "Cacio e pepe" ("cheese and pepper"); this off-menu version features agnolotti (a beef-filled pasta) topped with sheep's milk ricotta, cow's milk parmesan, and Pecorino cheeses, and spiced with nutmeg and black pepper; Il Bacaro Vini & Cucina in Via Degli Spagnoli for their off-menu "Pan-Seared Rabbit", marinated in garlic cloves, herbs, spices and red wine, sous-vide cooked, and plated with blueberries, olives, and coffee foam; E. Ceralli Forno Casareccio in the village of Frascati, 45 minutes southeast of Rome, for their porchetta (stuffed pig; only 4 of these are made per week) with aromatics and spices, slow-roasted at 355 degrees for 7 hours in a wood-fired oven, sliced, and sandwiched between pane rustico bread baked in the same oven; and Da Enzo, a chanteria in the Trastevere area (meaning "across the Tiber River") that serves classic Roman cuisine, for their limited-seasonal dish, "Pasta Gricia", rigatoni tossed in a light Pecorino Romano cheese sauce, paired with guanciale (cured pork cheek) and fava beans that are only harvested in April and May, and sprinkled with cracked pepper.
2.6	"Clock and Dagger"	Cape Town, South Africa	August 22, 2016
Adam is in Cape Town, South Africa to discover a lion's share of exotic meats and secret eats. Stops include: Mzolis Meat in the Gugulethu township, a butcher shop that serves South African barbecue called "Braai" (short for braaivleis, Afrikaans for roast braai + meat vleis) in their backyard, including "Boerewors", a traditional beef sausage with nutmeg, coriander seed, and garlic smoked on a wood-fired grill; Kloof Street House, a restaurant hidden in a Victorian house in the Gardens neighborhood, to try their off-menu "Springbok Loin", native springbok game meat, seasoned with white pepper and Maldon salt (English sea salt), pan-seared to rare, and served with gem squash, topped with gorgonzola, arugula, and toasted pine nuts, and drizzled with port wine reduction; Kalky's in Kalk Bay, 45 minutes outside the city district, for their Fish & Chips, which features local snook fish, battered in cake flour, deep-fried and served on a bed of homemade fries; and Spasie, a secret restaurant in Bo-Kaap (or "above the Cape") that is known for their "P.W.W." ("Pocket Watch Wednesdays") dinners, where only 10 people receive a pocket watch, which grants them and 4 guests entry, and then they bequeath the watch to someone else. There is a secret menu that's only revealed upon seating, and in this episode, it featured seared Mozambique curry & chili prawns with roasted butternut squash cubes and puree, fried prawn heads, and baby fennel salad.
2.7	"Polish Pizza Puzzle"	Warsaw, Poland	August 29, 2016
Adam heads to his ancestral homeland of Warsaw, Poland to find secret Polish delicacies. Stops include: Maka I Woda ("flour and water") in Srodmiescie, that dishes out authentic Neapolitan pizza in their oak-burning oven, including the once-a-year off-menu "Ramson Pizza", topped with ramsons (wild garlic), mozzarella di bufala, farm-fresh eggs, olive oil, and house-made mangalitsa salami; Serwus ("hello") in Mokotow for the P.P.R. communist-era street food called "Zapiekanka", an oven-toasted open-faced sandwich topped with cheese, mushrooms and ketchup, but he opts for their secret "Zapiekanka Piona", ("high five") layered with local butter, homemade ketchup made from sweet Polish tomatoes, red onions, rosemary, Bursztyn (Polish cheese), and kielbasa on a Polish-style baguette; Warburger Na Talerzu ("On Plate") in Mirow for their top-secret "Dziki Dzik Sliders", or "wild boar" burgers, three char-grilled patties, #1 topped with lazur (Polish blue cheese) and bacon, #2 topped with olomoucke (mild Czech sheep's milk cheese) and blueberry jam, #3 topped with zulty lazur (aged Polish blue cheese) and boczniak mushrooms—all with apple aioli on house-made slider buns; and Obiady Domowe Przysmak ("homemade meals bar", also in Srodmiescie), hidden in an apartment building which harkens back to the communist era, serving their "kotlet mielony", a 60-year-old recipe of ground pork patty mixed with fried onions and breaded with milk-soaked Kaiser roll crumbs, pan-fried, and plated with mashed potato puree and a sweet beet compote.
2.8	"Cashew 'Cue"	Ho Chi Minh City, Vietnam	August 29, 2016
Adam and his crew avoid the 32 million motorbikes in Vietnam as they make their way to secret eats in Ho Chi Minh City. Stops include: Quan Ut Ut ("The Tavern of Oink Oink") in Ben Thanh, a restaurant serving American-style barbecue, including their off-menu "Cashew Smoked Pork Ribs", smoked in cashew nut wood chips, grilled over coals, and smothered in a secret sauce featuring two Vietnamese cuisine staples—funky nuoc fish sauce and spicy ground Phu Quoc pepper, served with smoked okra and corn-on-the-cob; Secret Garden Vietnamese Cuisine & Tea House in District 1 for their one-of-a-kind "Pork Wrapped in Lemongrass", featuring ground pork, pork paste and pork fat mixed with lemongrass and fried garlic, stuffed inside an intricately carved lemongrass stalk and grilled; Soul Burger (hidden above a nail salon and also in Ben Thanh), which serves "The Worst Burgers in Vietnam", burgers named after soulful American stars, for the experimental "The Temptations Burger", an American beef patty seasoned with toasted Vietnamese sea salt, black pepper and smoked butter, grilled and topped with seared foie gras (goose liver), macerated mulberries, and watercress, and drizzled with gastrique on a buttered brioche bun; and Ru Pho Bar (also in District 1), a hidden restaurant serving the nation's favorite dish called "pho", including their "Brown Rice Noodle Pho", with 14-hour broth made with sa sung ("sea peanut worm"), brown noodles, beef, onions, scallions, mint, bean sprouts, and red chili.
2.9	"Searching for Satay"	Kuala Lumpur, Malaysia	September 5, 2016
Adam travels to Malaysia to try their cuisine which is a blend of Indian, Chinese and Malay. Stops include: Sate Zainah Ismail, a fourth-generation satay joint tucked away in Jalan Keramat to try their beef and chicken halal skewers marinated with sugar, ground peanuts, lemongrass and two kinds of turmeric powder, skewered and char-grilled; My Burger Lab just outside of the city in Sea Park, Selangor to eat "The Bomb", a secret burger, smashed flat-top grilled 1/4-pound beef brisket patty topped with cheese, a fried egg, onion rings, lettuce, red chili mayo and sriracha sauce on a signature black potato bun, made from ground bamboo charcoal; Merchant's Lane in Chinatown's Petaling Street, an Asian-fusion restaurant that was once a famous brothel in the 1980s to taste their "Italian Chow Mein", spaghetti mixed with masak merah (sweet & sour tomato sauce) and topped with a Malaysian twist on Bolognese sauce (Rendang chicken, a dish made with shallots, garlic, galangal, and ginger that preserves the meat); and Ikan Bakar Kak Jat in Brickfields, a seafood eatery hidden on a muddy path where patrons must walk past haunted vacant houses on their way. But it's worth it to savor their Pari (stingray), dipped in a spicy chili marinade, wrapped in a banana leaf and seared in a hot wok, served with a side of white rice, sambal kecap (sweet soy sauce), sambal asam (sour chili sauce), and spicy grilled squid.
2.10	"Bacon Me Crazy"	Johannesburg, South Africa	September 5, 2016
Adam and his crew head back to South Africa, this time to visit Johannesburg for their bacon-inspired dishes and "rainbow cuisine", a mish-mosh of flavors. Stops include: Urban Angel Bakery, Cafe & Food Store located at the security-gated Boskruin Office Park inside a gym in Randburg for their secret "Ultimate Bacon Sandwich", local beef used as buns stuffed with cheddar, parmesan, mozzarella, and halloumi cheeses, wrapped in bacon, seared on a flat-top grill and basted with butter in the oven; Sakhumzi Restaurant in the South Western Townships or Soweto for short, to try the "Lamb Shank Special", a lamb shank flavored with olive oil, paprika, black pepper and garlic, seared in rosemary, and braised with red wine for two hours, topped with rich pan-gravy and served with mashed potatoes and vegetables; Teta Mari (Arabic for "grandmother"), a Jewish deli with a Middle Eastern twist in Illovo for the off-menu "Kofta Special", spiced lamb and beef patties drizzled with house-made tahineh and pomegranate syrup, topped with pine nuts and salad, and rolled inside an olive-oil grilled laffa; and Cocobel Desserts, a food truck in the Maboneng Precinct that serves a changing menu of dishes; on this episode, it's the "Donut Pop Sundae", 12 chocolate-coated donut holes, hand-rolled in coconut shavings, and layered in a tall mason jar with chocolate syrup, whipped cream, and chocolate-coffee ice cream.
2.11	"Gourmet Garage"	Singapore	September 12, 2016
Adam and his crew explore the lush island republic of Singapore to discover the very best of their hidden eats. Stops include: New Ubin Seafood in Sin Ming Industrial Estate for Singapore's most famous dish, chilli crab, featuring a Sri Lanka mud crab prepared with a homemade chilli paste (made from 12 ingredients including chilli peppers, onions, various spices, and tomato ketchup) and cooked together with eggs and cornstarch; Horse's Mouth, a speakeasy hidden beneath Uma Uma! Original Hakata Ramen on Orchard Road, for char siu don ("roast pork served over rice"), roasted local pork belly which is marinated in juices from previous char siu don orders and then sliced and heated with a blowtorch, after which it is placed on a bed of white rice, mixed with green onions, and topped with onsen tamago ("hot spring egg", which is poached at a low temperature); The Great Escape, an open-air gastropub located past a parking garage beneath the Golden Theatre cinema in the Golden Mile Complex, which serves unique food that can either be eaten on site or delivered to your seat in the Golden Theatre; here, Adam gets the "Golden Dog", a blanched and roasted sweet Italian pork sausage placed in a buttered baguette lined with leaf lettuce, and topped with a homemade truffle mushroom sauce and chopped candied bacon (which is caramelized with brown sugar and whipped cream); and Artichoke on Waterloo Street in Sculpture Square for the secret "Lambgasm", a 6-pound lamb roast featuring lamb shoulder rubbed in salt, pepper, and a méchoui spice blend of paprika, cumin and coriander, drizzled with white wine and water and braised for 6 hours in mirepoix, which is then strained and reduced into a sauce that is poured over the lamb; the lamb is then cooked in a brick oven for 5 minutes then garnished with fresh mint, cilantro and lemon slices, and served with pita bread and various condiments for sandwich-making purposes; this off-menu dish must be ordered a full 48 hours in advance.
2.12	"Top Secret Tacos"	Mexico City, Mexico	September 12, 2016
Adam and his crew seek out the greatest hidden eats in and around Mexico's capital, Mexico City. Stops include: La Gruta ("The Grotto"), located inside a cave four stories underground near the Pyramid of the Sun in Teotihuacan (25 miles northwest of Mexico City), for their historic "barbacoa": lamb prepared with a soup of vegetables, garbanzo beans, rice, spearmint, and chili peppers, all covered in maguey leaves and cooked for half a day in an ancient Mayan pib with mesquite logs and volcanic rocks, after which the lamb is wrapped in banana leaves before being served; El Pinche Gringo, an American-inspired barbecue restaurant located inside an abandoned factory building in Narvarte, for the off-menu "Neoyorquino" ("New Yorker"), a barbecue sandwich of brisket and rib meat (smoked for 12 hours over oak and eucalyptus wood at 225 degrees F) mixed with juices from the rib meat and a homemade habanero sauce, then placed in a bun with pickles and onions and topped with a macaroni-and-cheese sauce; Hilaria, a gastropub hidden within a jewelry complex on Calle Madero in Centro Histórico, for the off-menu "Costillas Hilarias", a rack of American-style pork ribs with a Mexican twist, marinated in orange juice and basted in a homemade barbecue sauce sweetened with tamarind before a slow cook while wrapped in tinfoil; and Jules Basement, a speakeasy hidden beneath the Surtidora Don Batiz taco shop - behind a refrigerator door - in Polanco, for the secret "Taco de Jules", an Asian-influenced taco combining marinated arrachera (skirt steak) with cauliflower, carrots and broccoli, all cooked with a mix of Worcestershire sauce, Maggi Asian seasoning sauce, and chicken soup bouillon, and served on top of a toasted flour tortilla.
2.13	"Wok It Out"	Hong Kong	September 19, 2016
Adam and his crew visit Hong Kong to find the best of its secret eats. Stops include: Trafalgar, an English-style pub hidden on the 5th floor of a high-rise office building in Wan Chai, for the "Tomahawk Ribeye", a 2-pound tomahawk-shaped bone-in steak marinated in salt, black pepper, rosemary and olive oil before getting flame-grilled to perfection and finished in the oven; Star Cafe in Tsim Sha Tsui for the "Tomato and Beef Noodle Soup", a bowl of cooked instant noodles topped with sliced beef (which is boiled in a chicken-and-pork broth) and a broth of chopped fresh tomatoes; Sing Kee, a dai pai dong-style food stall in the Central District, for an off-menu dish of razor clams prepared wok hei-style in hot oil and mixed with black beans, onions, chilis, salt, sesame oil, oyster sauce, chili paste, and a cornstarch slurry; and Mrs. Pound, a speakeasy disguised as a stamp shop in Sheung Wan, for Ma La ("numb and spicy") chicken wings, prepared in a batter of chili spices, deep-fried and sprinkled with garlic, more chili, and sugar.
2.14	"Diva-licious Pig Roast"	Manila, Philippines	September 19, 2016
Adam and his crew head to Manila, capital city of the Philippines, for the tastiest of its secret food finds. Stops include: The Exit, hidden behind an "Exit" sign inside the Plaza Cafe in Makati, for the off-menu "Ostrich Salpicao", chunks of ostrich marinated in a mix of soy sauce, oyster sauce, spices, and a local fruit called calamansi, sauteed and plated over cauliflower purée while doused in leftover marinade and topped with garlic chips (which are boiled in milk); Elbert's Steak Room in Salcedo Village for the secret "Double Gold" steak, an aged New York Strip steak from mature cows (which once made it illegal in the United States), left "as is" while it is sprinkled with just salt and pepper and then grilled over hot lava rocks at 800 degrees F; Mendokoro Ramenba, also in Makati, for "Shoyu Mazesoba", a soupless ramen dish prepared with boiled fresh noodles, shoyu (Japanese soy sauce), leek oil, vegetable oil, white pepper, white vinegar, sprouts and cabbage, all topped with roast pork, a raw egg yolk, and pork back fat; and Pepita's Kitchen, a makeshift restaurant inside the head chef's house in Magallanes Village, for Filipino-style lechon (stuffed & roasted suckling pig) stuffed with truffle rice, roasted for four hours in a charcoal oven (allowing the pig skin to become crispy), and brushed with achuete oil; Adam and his crew are among the many guests to enjoy the dish as part of a big feast held by the chef.
2.15	"Sturgis Surprise"	Sturgis, South Dakota	February 1, 2017
Adam searches for the best hidden eats in the Black Hills of South Dakota in an episode coinciding with the popular annual Sturgis Motorcycle Rally. Stops include: JR's Rhodehouse BBQ Pit, a pop-up restaurant at the rally site, for the secret "El Frito Q Texicana", a limited sandwich (only available during the annual rally) consisting of 15-hour smoked and sliced beef brisket, pickled jalapeños and red onions, pepper jack cheese, and Fritos corn chips, all drizzled with homemade barbecue sauce and placed inside a garlic bun (which is slathered with Sriracha mayonnaise); Deadwood Social Club, located on the second floor of Saloon No. 10 in nearby Deadwood, for the off-menu "Wild Boar Poppers" (which was originally on the menu but had to be taken off because of insanely high demand), mild sweet cherry peppers filled with Sriracha cream cheese (flavored with garlic and onion powders), wrapped in smoked wild boar bacon, skewered with toothpicks and deep-fried; Jambonz Grill & Pub, one mile away from Sturgis's Main Street, for their secret Cajun-style frybread taco, a puffy Indian taco shell topped with deep-fried crawfish, Cajun coleslaw (flavored with vinegar, lime and Cajun spices), a homemade mango salsa, deep-fried okra, "comeback sauce" (a mix of mayonnaise and chili peppers), and crumbled feta cheese; and The Blind Lion, an underground speakeasy in Rapid City which can only be accessed at a top-secret entrance with a secret code (which changes daily), for the "Chicken Dijon Confit", locally-raised chicken thighs seasoned with kosher salt, placed in a pan with duck fat, olive oil, two garlic cloves and a bay leaf and oven-roasted for 3 hours, then sauteed in oil, mixed with a mustard sauce combining Dijon mustard, white wine, crème fraîche, parsley, and chicken stock, placed in a bowl with roasted potatoes, and topped with more mustard sauce.
2.16	"Arctic Circle: Iceland"	Reykjavík, Iceland	February 1, 2017
Adam and his crew travel to the Arctic European city of Reykjavík to discover its most unique and secret Viking-inspired dishes. Stops include: a pizzeria and speakeasy with no name or signs inside of a house in downtown Reykjavík where Adam tries an off-menu holiday-inspired sourdough pizza covered in creamy Icelandic cheese, sprinkled with shredded hard cheese and beet roots, cooked for three minutes at 700 degrees, then topped with arugula, deep-fried sugared walnuts, tarragon mayonnaise, and sliced hangikjöt (Icelandic lamb smoked with sheep dung and typically served during Christmastime); The Laundromat Café, a laundromat which also doubles as an eatery in the 101 District, for an off-menu meatball sandwich featuring ground beef blended with onions, celery, basil, parsley, garlic, eggs, and homemade bread crumbs, then lightly packed into meatball form before being cooked and mixed with a sauce made with roasted red peppers, mushrooms, tomatoes, onions, beef demi-glace, basil and oregano, all poured on top of roasted potatoes and sprinkled with shredded Icelandic Cheddar and Gouda cheeses, after which it all gets cooked in the oven once more before being placed inside a toasted baguette; Sægreifinn ("Sea Baron", also in the 101 District), an old pier-based seafood eatery which has no menu at all and instead serves patrons with whatever fish is caught that same day, where Adam tries what locals call the "world's best" lobster soup, which is made with Norway lobsters (langoustines) and a broth of herb cream, coconut milk, whey, and tomato paste, along with shrimp and lobster spices, lobster shells, halibut heads, and salmon skin, with the Norway lobsters placed into the soup raw and then cooking from the heat of the soup; and Fljótt Og Gott, a restaurant located inside a bus station in the Capital Region, for the "Full Viking", a secret meal which includes sheep heads boiled in water and salt, pieces of kæstur hákarl (fermented and rotting shark meat), and a strong caraway-flavored local schnapps called Black Death.
2.17	"Arctic Circle: Greenland"	Greenland	February 1, 2017
Adam searches for the best secret menu items on the ice-covered European island of Greenland. Stops include: Mamartut in Ilulissat for their off-menu reindeer schnitzel, featuring a cut of local reindeer shoulder meat which is lightly tenderized, sprinkled with Rypekrog (ground spices from the gizzard of a grouse), pan-fried in butter to a medium rare, and plated with local berries and vegetables; Hotel Icefiord (also in Ilulissat) for the off-menu "Thai fried rice with Greenlandic snow crab", a mound of rice cooked in a pan with scrambled eggs, chopped carrots and onions, sea salt, sugar, soy sauce, local snow crab meat, and spring onions, and garnished with sliced cucumber and tomato; while here, Adam also gets to try their special Greenlandic coffee, mixing fresh hot coffee together with local coffee liqueur and Irish whiskey (both of which are blended together by flame) and topped off with fresh whipped cream and a shot of flaming triple sec, before traveling by boat on the rough waters of Disko Bay - past several icebergs - to the last stop, H8 in Oqaatsut, where he and his crew help prepare cuisine and set up tables for the incoming customers before getting to try the restaurant's seafood platter of locally caught and fried capelin and halibut, lemon-boiled cod, bay shrimp, and smoked halibut, all garnished with cucumbers, tomatoes, parsley, and fresh dill.
