= Magnolia Network =

American cable television channel

- Country: United States
- Headquarters: Waco, Texas, U.S.

Programming
- Picture format: 1080i HDTV (downscaled to letterboxed 480i for the SDTV feed)

Ownership
- Owner: Skydance Corporation; Chip Gaines; Joanna Gaines
- Parent: Skydance TV; Magnolia
- Sister channels: see list of assets owned by Skydance Corporation

History
- Launched: September 30, 1999; 27 years ago (original launch; as DIY Network); January 5, 2022; 4 years ago (relaunch; as Magnolia Network)
- Former names: DIY Network (1999–2022)

Links
- Website: www.magnolia.com/network

Availability

Streaming media
- Service(s) HBO Max/Discovery+: DirecTV Stream, Hulu with Live TV, Philo, Sling TV, YouTube TV

Magnolia Network is an American basic cable network owned by Skydance Corporation in partnership with Chip and Joanna Gaines, the founders of lifestyle company Magnolia. It broadcasts personality-based lifestyle programs related to topics such as home construction, renovation, and cuisine.

The channel was first launched by the E. W. Scripps Company on September 30, 1999, as DIY Network: a spin-off of HGTV focusing on instructional programming related to "do it yourself" (DIY) activities such as home improvement. It later focused on reality series following personalities involved in home renovation and related businesses. In 2022, the channel relaunched as Magnolia Network, a joint venture with Chip and Joanna Gaines of the HGTV series Fixer Upper.

As of December 2023, Magnolia Network is available to 51 million pay television households in the United States, down from its 2016 peak of 62 million households.

== History ==
Logo used from 1999 to 2022

DIY was the second network to be launched by the E. W. Scripps Company, following the success of HGTV, with the network's first two years adapting HGTV's program library into programs for certain DIY niches as Scripps filmed new original content for the new network. The network offered a large amount of broadband content (originally project worksheets and instruction pages for printout by users, later video clips and more) to create demand for and help cable operators launch and justify their cable broadband services.

Scripps announced that DIY Network would launch in high definition on May 1, 2010, on "two prominent distributors", adding 200 new original programs by year's end. One of the "prominent distributors" turned out to be Dish Network, which launched DIY HD on May 12, 2010. DirecTV added DIY HD on September 19, 2012.

=== Relaunch as Magnolia Network ===
In November 2018, Chip and Joanna Gaines of the former HGTV series Fixer Upper announced on The Tonight Show Starring Jimmy Fallon that they were in early talks to form a "lifestyle focused media network" with Discovery Inc. via their personal company Magnolia. The duo had left HGTV shortly after the acquisition of Scripps Networks Interactive by Discovery; after realizing that Fixer Upper had been one of the network's top programs, Discovery CEO David Zaslav met the Gaineses at their home in Waco, Texas to discuss a joint venture.

In April 2019, Discovery officially announced their new venture, and that its linear television component would launch some time in 2020, replacing DIY Network. HGTV president Allison Page was named president of the venture, reporting directly to Zaslav. Discovery announced on January 16, 2020, that the Magnolia Network would launch on October 4. The launch was then delayed indefinitely on April 21, as the COVID-19 pandemic impacted the ability to produce the network's launch programming. Magnolia Network went on with a four-part preview special that month, Magnolia Presents: A Look Back & A Look Ahead, which premiered on DIY Network to a total of 2.5 million viewers.

On August 4, 2020, it was announced that Magnolia Network would launch in 2021. A revival of Fixer Upper, titled Fixer Upper: Welcome Home, was also confirmed to be in production. A preview of Magnolia Network's launch programming was released on the newly-launched Discovery+ on January 4, 2021. A second preview special, A Look Back & A Look Ahead Vol. 2, premiered on Discovery+ on April 23 and DIY Network the next day. The Magnolia Network app and an early slate of programming on Discovery+, including Fixer Upper: Welcome Home, launched on July 15.

On January 5, 2022, DIY Network officially relaunched as Magnolia Network. Within days, one of its launch and spotlight series, Home Work, was removed from the network and Discovery+ due to allegations of substandard work, lengthy delays and egregious billing by the show's hosts, Andrew and Candis Meredith, on previous projects. The series was soon brought back to Magnolia Network after the investigation found no "ill or malicious" intents by the couple that ran the series.

In April 2022, Discovery Inc. merged with WarnerMedia to form Warner Bros. Discovery. On April 7, 2022, it was reported that after the completion of the merger, Magnolia Network's leadership would report to HBO and HBO Max chief content officer Casey Bloys rather than Zaslav, nor head of U.S. Networks Kathleen Finch (who oversaw the former SNI channels as chief officer of lifestyle brands after the Discovery acquisition). On August 4, 2022, it was reported that selected Magnolia Network programs would be added to HBO Max on September 30, 2022, with Discovery+ remaining the network's main streaming home.

== Programming ==
In the past, DIY Network's programming focused on:

- Home construction (Building Off the Grid)
- Home repair or restoration (Bath Crashers, Yard Crashers, Blog Cabin, Ed the Plumber, Kitchen Crashers, Maine Cabin Masters, Restored, Sweat Equity)
- Home improvement (The Vanilla Ice Project, BATHtastic, Mega Dens, Man Caves, Cool Tools)
- Gardening and landscaping (Yard Crashers)
- Building and contracting (Million Dollar Contractor, Sledgehammer, Barnwood Builders, Texas Flip and Move)

Earlier shows included a variety of topics, including auto repair, jewelry design, plumbing, boating, knitting and quilting, and woodworking. DIY's renovation shows included programs that had a specific historical restoration focus, like Restored, and some shows had specific geographic focuses, like shows outlining historical restorations in Virginia and South Carolina, for example.

The network also carried This Old House repeats until the mid-2010s, when the property moved to other outlets. As recently as late 2009, it aired some older HGTV archive programming, including the Carol Duvall Show.

As Magnolia Network, the channel carries a similar mixture of personality-based series relating to home design, construction, renovation, and landscaping, with new original programming, and programs carried over from DIY Network (including Barnwood Builders, Building Off the Grid, and returning reruns of This Old House, among others). The network's scope was also expanded to include food-oriented series, such as Family Dinner and Magnolia Table with Joanna Gaines, and other series such as Extraordinary Stories Behind Everyday Things.

In 2024, the network expanded into reality competition programming with three series produced by the Gaines: the artistic roller skating competition series Roller Jam, talent competition series Second Chance Stage, and game show Human vs Hamster. All three series premiered exclusively on HBO Max.

== International versions ==
=== Canada ===
A Canadian version of DIY Network launched on October 19, 2009, by CW Media (a consortium of Canwest and Goldman Sachs), replacing the Canadian version of Fine Living. As in the U.S., a preview of Magnolia Network's programming was initially offered in Canada via Discovery+ upon its local launch in October 2021, before DIY Network Canada relaunched as Magnolia Network on March 28, 2022.

The channel was closed on December 31, 2024, as Corus Entertainment lost the rights to all Warner Bros. Discovery factual brands to Rogers Communications. The channel was replaced by a legally distinct, Rogers-owned version of Magnolia Network on January 1, 2025.
