= Declassified (2016 TV series) =

American documentary series

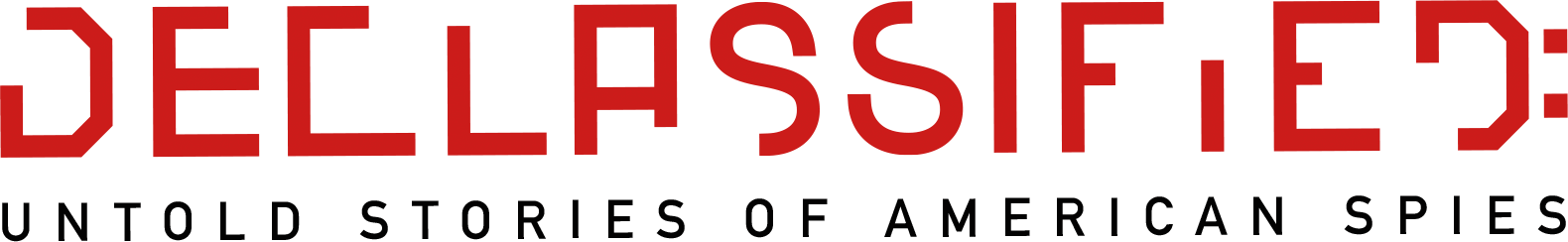
- Also known as: Declassified: Untold Stories of American Spies
- Genre: Documentary
- Created by: Aaron Saidman
- Directed by: Domini Hofmann
- Starring: Mike Rogers
- Opening theme: The Hit House
- Country of origin: United States
- Original language: English
- No. of seasons: 3
- No. of episodes: 24

Production
- Executive producers: Mike Rogers, Domini Hofmann, Greg Lipstone
- Producers: Pete Ritchie, Cristina Bishai, Dana Boratenski, Shannon McCarty, Brian Nagahashi
- Cinematography: Anne Etheridge, Matthew R. Blute
- Camera setup: Single Camera
- Running time: 40–44 minutes
- Production company: All3 Media America

Original release
- Network: CNN
- Release: June 19, 2016 – November 17, 2019

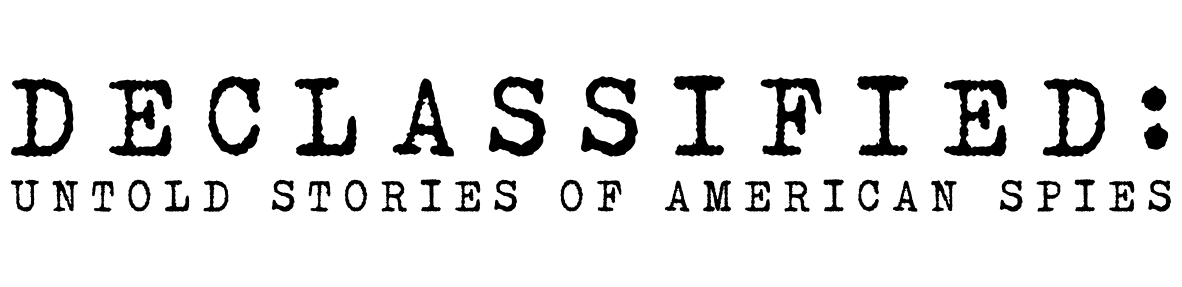
2016 logo

Declassified: Untold Stories of American Spies is a documentary series that details important cases, missions and operations of the American intelligence community, told firsthand by the men and women who worked them.

Producers collaborate with prominent intelligence, military and government agencies such as CIA, FBI, NSA, DIA, DOD, Homeland Security, The State Department, et al., to tell their stories in a non-political, objective way that spotlights the perspective of people that do the work.

The series debuted on CNN on June 19, 2016. Season 2 premiered on July 22, 2017. Season 3 premiered on September 29, 2019.

== Episodes ==
=== Series overview ===
Season	Episodes	Originally released	
Season	Episodes	First released	Last released
1	8	June 19, 2016	September 4, 2016
2	8	July 22, 2017	September 23, 2017
3	8	September 29, 2019	November 17, 2019

=== Season 1 (2016) ===
No. overall	No. in season	Title	Subject	Original release date
1	1	"Trigon: The KGB Chess Game"	Aleksandr Dmitrievich Ogorodnik	June 19, 2016
2	2	"The Hunt for Saddam"	Saddam Hussein	June 26, 2016
3	3	"Zarqawi: The father of ISIS"	Abu Musab al-Zarqawi	July 3, 2016
4	4	"Ana Montes, Queen of Cuba"	Ana Montes	July 10, 2016
5	5	"Cross International: The Billion Dollar Black Market"	Amir Hossein Ardebili	August 14, 2016
6	6	"The Taliban's Double Agent"	Dayna Curry and Heather Mercer	August 21, 2016
7	7	"Red Storm Rising: Naval Secrets Exposed"	Chi Mak	August 28, 2016
8	8	"Hexagon: Secret Satellite"	KH-9 Hexagon	September 4, 2016

=== Season 2 (2017) ===
No. overall	No. in season	Title	Subject	Original release date
9	1	"Operation Ghost Stories: The Spies Next Door"	Illegals Program	July 22, 2017
10	2	"The Peacock: Merchant of War"	Monzer al-Kassar	July 29, 2017
11	3	"Hijacked: Terror in the Sky"	EgyptAir Flight 648	August 5, 2017
12	4	"Heroin's Godfather: Haji Bagcho"	Haji Bagcho	September 23, 2017
13	5	"Fidel's Personal Spies: The Myers"	Kendall Myers	August 26, 2017
14	6	"Crack 99: Defense Secrets for Sale"	Xiang Li	September 2, 2017
15	7	"American Terrorists: The Order"	The Order	August 19, 2017
16	8	"Spy and Son The Nicholsons"	Harold James Nicholson	September 23, 2017

=== Season 3 (2019) ===
No. overall	No. in season	Title	Subject	Original release date
17	1	"Tracking Terror: The 9/11 Subway Plot"	NYC Subway plot	September 29, 2019
18	2	"The Norte Valle Cartel"	Norte del Valle Cartel	October 6, 2019
19	3	"The Terrorist Next Door: Operation Smokescreen"	Operation Smokescreen	October 13, 2019
20	4	"Hunting War Criminals"	Bosnian Genocide	October 20, 2019
21	5	"The Spy Game: Russian Espionage"	Russian Listening Bug in the State Department	October 27, 2019
22	6	"Buried Secrets, Unbreakable Codes"	Brian Patrick Regan, former civilian employee of DIA	November 3, 2019
23	7	"The Merchant of Death: Viktor Bout"	Viktor Bout	November 10, 2019
24	8	"Operation Firewall: The Takedown of Shadowcrew"	ShadowCrew	November 17, 2019
