= Prisoners of Hope =

2003 book by Dayna Curry and Heather Mercer

- Author: Dayna Curry and Heather Mercer
- Language: English
- Publisher: WaterBrook Press
- Publication place: United States
- English publication date: December 16, 2003
- Media type: Print (hardcover and paperback)
- Pages: 320
- ISBN: 978-1-57-856646-4

Prisoners of Hope: The Story of Our Captivity and Freedom in Afghanistan is the 2003 memoir of Christian aid workers Dayna Curry and Heather Mercer. The book details their early lives, their humanitarian work in Afghanistan, and their three months of imprisonment by the Taliban in 2001.

Born to middle-class American families, Curry and Mercer met at Antioch Community Church in Waco, Texas. They volunteered to work as aid workers with Shelter Now International (SNI) and were living in Afghanistan in 2001, having been motivated by a desire to serve "the poorest of the poor". While there, they provided humanitarian aid to hospitals, street children, and impoverished communities in Kabul. Curry and Mercer were arrested by the Taliban on August 3 after helping a local family to view the Jesus film and imprisoned for over 100 days along with several other foreign volunteers. During their internment, they were threatened with execution and became ill from head lice, asthma, and intestinal worms. Though the experience was "devastatingly hard", they wrote songs of praise to God and attempted to encourage the other prisoners. All of the SNI members were eventually freed by United States forces during operations in Kabul following the September 11 attacks of 2001.

Curry and Mercer jointly wrote their memoir in the year following their rescue. It was released in the summer of 2002 and received favorable reviews from critics.

== Background ==
Dayna Curry grew up in Forest Hill, a suburb outside of Nashville, Tennessee with a population of roughly 23,000. Her parents divorced when she was young. She had a troubled youth following the divorce which included drugs, underage sex, shoplifting, and an abortion at the age of 17, all of which she deeply regretted. After becoming a Christian, she was able to "start all over and have a new life". She graduated from Brentwood High School in 1989 and subsequently attended Baylor University in Waco, Texas. Her father later stated, "I've always noticed her ... wanting to help people, and she's tended to have done this through Christian-based organizations." Heather Mercer grew up in a middle-class family in Vienna, Virginia. Like Curry, her parents also divorced and she attended Baylor University after graduating from Madison High School in 1995. She converted to Christianity after attending a church concert.

"I was not confident I had much to offer a devastated nation like Afghanistan. I had no experience to qualify me—only average talents and abilities. In prayer I felt God ask me if I could do three things: Can you love your neighbor? Can you serve the poor? Can you weep as I weep for poor and broken people? I came to see God didn't need someone with extraordinary gifts and achievements. He just needed someone who could love, share her life, and feel for others as he did. He was looking for faithfulness, not fame."

— Heather Mercer

Curry, then 29, and Mercer, then 24, met through their shared involvement in the Antioch Community Church in Waco, Texas, where they received the opportunity to serve in Kabul, Afghanistan as aid workers with Shelter Now International (SNI). Mercer's parents strongly opposed the decision, especially after her younger sister, Hannah, died from an accidental prescription drug overdose shortly before her departure at the age of 21. Despite being placed in the upscale Wazir Akbar Khan neighborhood in Kabul, Curry and Mercer purposely requested the "smallest, most decrepit house on the street", explaining that they had come to serve the poor and did not want to be treated as wealthy foreigners.

While in Kabul, they worked with a large number of street children. Curry made a point to dedicate a least two days a week to helping one named Omar, whose father had recently died and whose family was struggling financially. Mercer regularly bought shoeshine and shoes for the children, who, according to Curry, began to call her "the compassionate one". When an interviewer later asked about the other forms of work they did, they responded, "At other times of day, we gave bread, fruit, or juice to the beggars we encountered. A small shop and produce stand were located at the end of our street, and when women beggars approached us, we would ask them to follow us to the shop and pick out the things they needed." Katrin Jelinek, one of their German coworkers, organized a program for boys to receive a hot meal and job training classes.

Towards the end of the summer, an Afghan family they had befriended began to ask about their faith and expressed interest in seeing a film about Jesus. Curry and Mercer agreed to privately show the film in the family's home on August 3, 2001.

Subsequently, the Taliban arrested Curry, Mercer, six other foreign aid workers, and 16 Afghan SNI members on accusations of proselytizing and converting to another religion respectively. The other captives included Germans Georg Taubmann, Margrit Stebnar, Katrin Jelinek, and Silke Duerrkopf, and Australians Diana Thomas and Peter Bunch. Curry and Mercer, along with the other aid workers, were detained in a number of women's prisons. They recounted that Afghan inmates at the Ministry for the Propagation of Virtue and the Prevention of Vice's prison were regularly and severely beaten for small infractions. "The screams were so horrendous," relayed Curry. "I've never heard anything like that." Though the Western women were not beaten, they suffered a number of physical discomforts; several prisoners contracted head lice, including Mercer, and flies infested the cell so badly that Curry and Mercer each killed about 150 every day. The bathrooms were unsanitary with toilets shared by over 40 individuals and cold showers. The 10-by-10-foot (3.0 m × 3.0 m) prison cells left the inmates crowded. All of the women contracted intestinal worms, and Curry struggled with asthma. Still, the detainees were allowed frequent communication with their relatives in the United States, and they were able to interact more directly with the Afghan women than before, as the Taliban was less concerned with regulating their communications. "We got to hear their stories and sing their songs and dance with them and play games with them and wash clothes together," Mercer said.

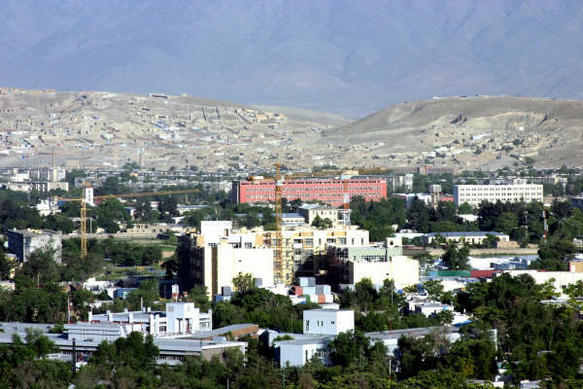
Wazir Akbar Khan neighborhood in Kabul, where Dayna Curry and Heather Mercer lived prior to their arrest

The Taliban charged Curry and Mercer with evangelizing Muslims and frequently interrogated them. The two were informed that they could potentially be executed if the case went to trial. Both state that they leaned on their faith as a reprieve from their emotional anguish throughout the ordeal and wrote several praise songs. Curry marked her 30th birthday in prison on November 4 and was allowed to send a letter to Antioch Community Church, which was published in the US. In it, she said, in part, "It is so good to hear that so many people are praying. I hope they are praying for this country along with us."

All 24 SNI members were freed by Northern Alliance and US troops on November 15 during an anti-Taliban uprising. The night before their rescue, they had been forced to sleep in a steel container while being transferred to another prison, and, according to Georg Taubmann, a German captive, it was "terribly cold.... We had no blankets. We were freezing the whole night through." According to Mercer, "The men who came and rescued us did a fabulous job - I don't think Hollywood could have done it better." Curry and Mercer spent a total of 105 days in the Taliban's prisons.

A year after their rescue, Heather Mercer stated, "I would do it all over again because I know the tremendous good that has come out of the situation. Not just for us but for many of the Afghan people." She added, "The Afghan people are amazing. I wish every American could know an Afghan in their lifetime. They are some of the most hospitable, resourceful, kind people I have ever met. For all they have suffered, they are a people that have overcome. I think some of the greatest lessons I have learn, even in the short time I was in Afghanistan, have come from poor Afghan people. You have nothing, but give everything. They find ways to overcome even the most tremendous obstacles." Dayna Curry also expressed hope of being able to return to Afghanistan to continue serving the Afghan people.

== White House visit ==
Shortly after their rescue, Dayna Curry and Heather Mercer were invited to the White House by then-President George W. Bush. Of the experience, they stated, "It was really privilege and honor to see the president, to be able to visit the Oval Office, and then to be able to stand with him out in the rose garden." Bush acknowledged to the public that he had spent a significant amount of time worrying about the safety of the aid workers, especially for Curry and Mercer. At the Rose Garden press conference honoring the two, he stated:

Heather Mercer and Dana Curry decided to go to help people who needed help. Their faith led them to Afghanistan. One woman who knows them best put it this way: They had a calling to serve the poorest of the poor, and Afghanistan is where that calling took them. And Heather and Dana's faith in God sustained them throughout their ordeal. It's a wonderful story about prayer, about a faith that can sustain people in good times and in bad times. Their faith was a source of hope that kept them from becoming discouraged. I talked to them right after their release, their freedom, and I sensed no bitterness in their voice, no fatigue, just joy. It was an uplifting experience for me to talk to these courageous souls.

== Subsequent events ==
Dayna Curry and Heather Mercer made a number of national appearances on television programs such as Larry King Live and the Today Show encouraging others to become active in foreign missions and aid work. Mercer's mother Deb Oddy, who had opposed her daughter's decision to go to Afghanistan from the beginning, began to publicly denounce the mission in the days that followed the prisoners' release. An interview by Oddy on Dateline NBC led to the widespread misconception that Curry and Mercer had gone to Kabul only to evangelize. They responded that that was not the case and later divulged that one of their primary reasons for writing Prisoners of Hope was to allow the American public to have an accurate account of what had happened. Additionally, all of the profits from the book's sales went towards helping the Afghan people.

Heather Mercer founded Global Hope in 2008, a nonprofit organization that serves in Iraq. While working in Iraq, she married Mohanad, a Kurdish Christian from the region. Ten years after Curry and Mercer's release, the latter was interviewed by Timothy C. Morgan of Christianity Today. During the interview, she reiterated that she does not regret her decision to go to Afghanistan and stated that everyone involved in the hostage crisis continues their work in relief aid.

== Response ==
=== Reviews ===
A Publishers Weekly review stated that the book's divided perspective between Heather Mercer and Dayna Curry made it difficult to follow but that the story remained compelling. It concluded, "Especially heartbreaking are the stories of all the Afghan families who were relying on the women for life-saving support and who were abruptly cut off at the time of their arrest. Perhaps most powerful is the honesty with which Mercer discusses her spiritual difficulties in captivity. This is not the story of larger-than-life heroines whose faith never wavers in the face of persecution; readers are allowed glimpses into Mercer's very real despair and the rift it caused in the group of prisoners. This gritty sense of the real life of ordinary, believing Americans keeps the pages turning." A review from Charlotte Mecklenburg Library was similarly favorable, calling Prisoners of Hope "exciting and intense" and the authors "courageous".

=== Documentary ===
A 2009 documentary film entitled Kabul 24 details the imprisonment of the aid workers, the ransacking of the SNI offices, the dismal conditions of the detainees, the torture of the 16 Afghan prisoners, and the eventual rescue of the hostages. The opening was narrated by Jim Caviezel, who portrayed Jesus in The Passion of the Christ. In it, he says, "It is the rare person willing to make the unqualified sacrifice who changes the world...Eight anonymous people were suddenly thrust upon the world stage, reluctant players in a life and death struggle between good and evil."

== Bibliography ==
- Dayna Curry; Heather Mercer; Stacy Mattingly (2003). Prisoners of Hope. New York: WaterBrook Press. ISBN 1578566460.
