= Prisoners of Hope (disambiguation) =

- Prisoners of Hope is a 2003 memoir of American missionaries and aid workers Dayna Curry and Heather Mercer

Prisoner(s) of hope may also refer to:

- Prisoner of Hope, a song written by Sterling Whipple and Gerald Metcalf
  - A 1981 single by Johnny Lee
- "Prisoner of Hope" (Gaither Vocal Band song), 2008
- "The Prisoner's Hope" ("Tramp! Tramp! Tramp!"), a popular song of the American Civil War by George F. Root

== See also ==
- Prisoner's Hope, a 1995 novel in the Seafort Saga by David Feintuch
