= Church of Antioch (disambiguation) =

The Church of Antioch (Arabic: كنيسة أنطاكية) was one of the five major churches that composed the Christian Church before the East–West Schism.

== Church of Antioch branches ==
The Church of Antioch has developed into the following main branches:

=== Catholic ===
- Syriac Maronite Church
- Melkite Greek Catholic Church
- Syriac Catholic Church

=== Orthodox Church of Antioch ===
Eastern Orthodox

- Greek Orthodox Church of Antioch, or the Eastern Orthodox Patriarchate of Antioch and All the East

Oriental Orthodox

- Syriac Orthodox Church

== Other churches ==
- Catholic Apostolic Church of Antioch, an independent Catholic church not in communion with Rome founded in 1958
- Free Church of Antioch, one of several Malabar Rite Independent Catholic Churches claiming valid lines of apostolic succession in the historical episcopate but not in communion with Rome or any Orthodox patriarch

== Church Buildings ==
- Church of Saint Peter, in Antioch

== See also ==
- Antioch
- Patriarch of Antioch
- List of Patriarchs of Antioch
- Antioch International Movement of Churches
