= Douglas Layton =

American nonprofit executive and author

- Born: Douglas Layton; November 1, 1950; Safford, Arizona
- Occupation: Manager - Consultant - Author - Artist
- Known for: Author - Political Activist

Douglas Layton is the founder of several International humanitarian organizations, an American author, businessman, and champion of human rights and religious freedom in the Middle East. He is an adviser to various social and political groups including the Kurds of Iraq. Layton is also an artist and avid patron of the arts.

== Personal life ==
Layton held various leadership positions as a high school student, including Student Body President of the 4000-student Alhambra High in Phoenix, Arizona. He was Ambassador Plenipotentiary from France to the Model United Nations. He was named Outstanding Senior Debater, was a varsity letterman in track and field, and was named ‘Best Supporting Actor by the Thespian Society. He received the prestigious William Danforth "I Dare You Award for Outstanding Leadership" in his senior year.

From 1968 to 1970, Layton attended the United States International University in Point Loma, California, where he studied political science and communications, intending to enter the field of International Law or diplomacy. He later attended Arizona Christian University and, in 2002, received a Th.D from the Phoenix University of Theology with the honor of summa cum laude and a distinction in Islamic studies.

Layton has lived overseas most of his adult life in Europe, Asia, and the Middle East. He currently lives in California. He has two children, three granddaughters, and one grandson.

== Professional career ==
Layton founded Shelter Now International in 1977, a relief and development organization working in Afghanistan with offices in Germany. The organization was propelled to international attention when five of its members including Layton's successor were held hostage by the Taliban for 18 months.

Layton founded Servant Group International (SGI) in 1992. SGI was initially established to assist Kurdish refugees in Nashville, TN and later established medical and relief work in Kurdistan of Iraq where 95% (4500) of the villages had been destroyed by Saddam Hussein. While. Director of SGI Layton established the first English language school in Kurdistan Classical School of the Medes in January 2001 in the city of Sulaymaniyah, 2002 in Dohuk and 2003 in Erbil the Capital of Iraqi Kurdistan.

Layton was Iraq Country Director of the US State Department funded Health Care Partnerships (HCP). During this time he administered grants to 22 nongovernmental organizations and established a regional health care communications network linking all medical facilities by satellite. HCP initiated the first major medical curriculum revision in Kurdistan in over 30 years, working hand in hand with East Tennessee State University.

From 2006 to 2008, Layton was Iraq Country Director of the Kurdistan Development Corporation, a public-private partnership with the Kurdish Regional Government (KRG), an investment holding and trading company with offices in London, Berlin, and Erbil, Kurdistan.

Layton is the owner and CEO of Explore Mesopotamia (formerly The Other Iraq Tours), the first inwardly focused tour company in Kurdistan of Iraq. The region was named by National Geographic Traveler as among the top 20 Adventure Tour destinations in the world for 2011.

Layton is also the founder and current director of "Create it Beautiful," an international campaign to focus cities on their communities' positive elements and empower local aspiring artists.

== Political activism ==
Beginning in 1992 Layton championed the Iraqi Kurdish cause in the United States through contacts on Capitol Hill and through the media. In 1995 Layton testified as an expert before the US Senate Foreign Relations Subcommittee on Near Eastern and South and Central Asian Affairs regarding the genocide against the Kurds by Saddam Hussein.

Layton coined the term "Kurdistan:The Other Iraq" now widely used by media outlets referring to Kurdistan. He helped concept the very successful PR Campaign which was executed by Kurdistan Development Corporation and aired on CNN, FOX, CBS, BBC and most major news outlets in the US, Britain and other countries such as Japan and Australia.

While Layton was director of Servant Group International he was widely recognized as a key catalyst in securing religious freedom for the Evangelical Church of Kurdistan. This was acknowledged by his detractors. After a friend of Layton's was assassinated in Erbil (Mansour Hussein Sifer) by an Islamic Fundamentalist and after repeated threats and attacks on the Evangelical Church, Layton mounted an International campaign to end religious persecution in Kurdistan. He ultimately mobilized the leaders of over 100 major Christian organizations including the National Association of Evangelicals and the Vatican to assist in resolving the issue. The campaign met with a favorable response and the Government of Iraqi Kurdistan(KRG) has since stood staunchly for religious freedom for all faiths including the Evangelical Church. The KRG often publicly expresses its commitment to religious freedom in spite of the turmoil and unrest in other nearby Muslim countries.

Together with Bishop Augustus B. “Gus” Marwieh and Dr. Romeo Horto, Layton led an Americo-Liberian conflict resolution team to Monrovia in 2003. They intended to convince then-President Charles Taylor to resign from office and thus pave the way for a restoration of democracy and an end to the civil war. The project was called “Operation Restore Liberia.” During this Project, Dr. Layton, together with Dr. Horton and Bishop Marweih, met with the then President Charles Taylor on several occasions as well as with then Foreign Minister of Liberia Monie Ralph Captan and the Ambassador from the United States to Liberia, John Blaney and numerous members of the Liberian Government including the Chief Justice of the Supreme, Gloria Musu-Scott. Dr. Layton was also in Ghana during the Accra Peace talks that ultimately resulted in peace and the restoration of Democracy in Liberia.

Layton is an associate member of the Next Century Foundation based in London, England. The object of The Next Century Foundation is to promote conflict resolution and reconciliation, principally in the Middle East. They have been the primary source of reliable daily information on the crisis in Syria. Layton hosted a delegation from Next Century Foundation including William Morris, the General Secretary and son of the founder on a fact finding tour in Kurdistan in 2006.

== Published works ==
- Kurdistan Tour Guide, World Impact Press LLC/Kurdistan Iraq Tours LLC, May 2015, ISBN 978-0996266703
- Our Father's Kingdom: The Church and the Nations, World Impact Press, LLC., December 2000, ISBN 0970424302 (Forewords by George Otis Jr., P. Andrew Sandlin and Dr. George Grant)
- Deceiving A Nation-Islam in America, World Impact Press, LLC., 2002. ISBN 0970424310(Foreword by Dr. Stephen Mansfield)
- Searching for Democracy, (co-authored by Dr. Stephen Mansfield - Forewords by Senator Fred Thompson and Lt. Gov. John Wilder)
- Kurds in the Bible, English, German, Kurmanji, Badanini, Sorani. Rutledge Hill Press (Subsidiary of Thomas Nelson Inc., Nashville, TN) January 1, 1994
- Grandpa Charlie: The Untold Story of Whitey Bulger English. World Impact Press. September 2015
