= The Other Iraq =

Advertising campaign for Iraqi Kurdistan

The Other Iraq is an advertising campaign created to promote commerce in the Kurdistan Region. It is run by the Kurdistan Development Corporation to promote investment and trade.

== "Thank you" ads ==
Part of their promotions include a series of advertisements thanking the United States, the United Kingdom, and their allies for removing the regime of Saddam Hussein. The advertisements can be viewed from the promotional website.

== Individuals and advisors involved ==
Masoud Barzani, the previous President of Kurdistan said: "The United States has never wavered in its quest to help Iraqis build a democracy that rewards compromise and consensus. The ever generous American people have paid a tragic price, the lives of their finest men and women, to advance the banner of freedom and democracy, a sacrifice for which we are profoundly grateful."

Others

- Douglas Layton, - Originator or THE OTHER IRAQ concept and public relations campaign and the Country Director of Kurdistan Development Corporation during the campaign
- Michael McNamara, – Penumbra /IMS – Video Production of Thank You America commercial, and related ads and mini documentaries
- MaxPaul Franklin - Project Cinematographer
- Jano Rosebiani - Kurdish Film Consultant
- Sal Russo, – Founder Russo Marsh and Rogers – Public Relations and Distributor
- Nijyar Shemdin, Kurdistan Regional Government Representative to the US, Canada, and the United Nations
- Brendan O'Leary, Constitutional Adviser to the Kurdistan Regional Government
- Karol Sultan, member of the Department of Government and Politics at the University of Maryland, College Park
- Bayan Sami Abdul Rahman, Kurdistan Regional Government Representative to the United Kingdom and Chairman of the Kurdistan Development Corporation
- Khaled Salih, Political Advisor to the Kurdistan Regional Government
- Nicholas Somerville, Executive Director of the Kurdistan Development Corporation
- Peter Galbraith, Adviser to the Kurdistan Regional Government
- William Garaway, documentary producer William Garaway
- Matthew Freedman, long time Kurdish advocator and supporter
