= Chip Gaines =

American television personality

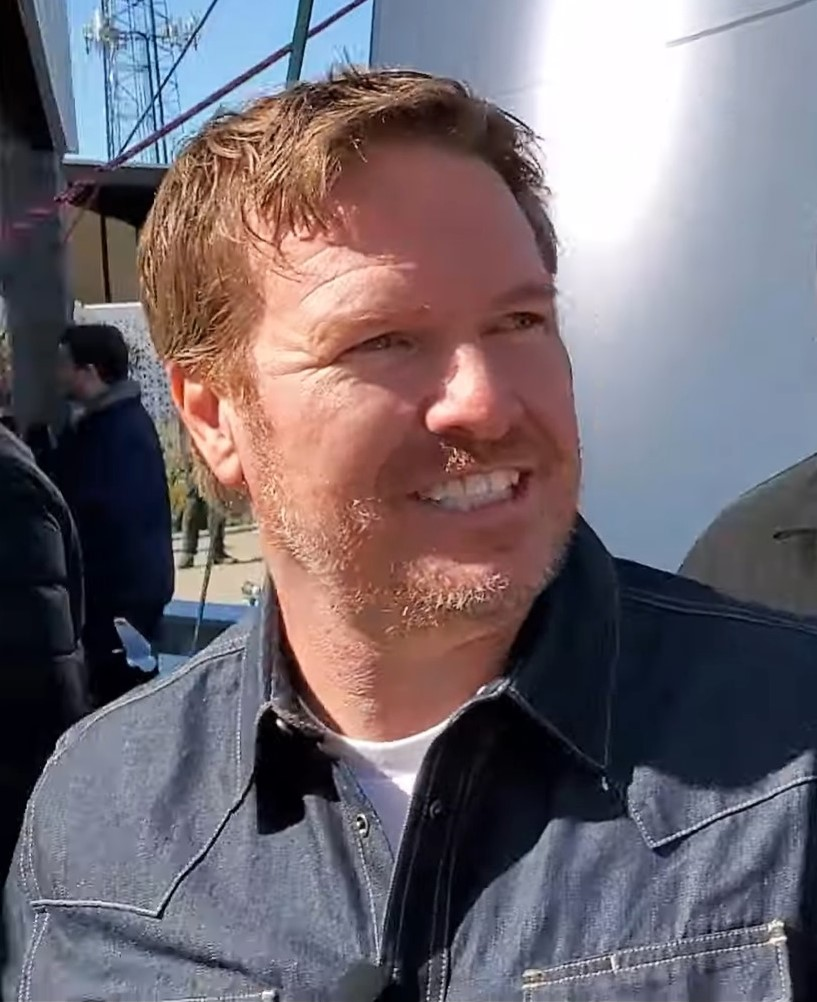
- Gaines in 2022
- Born: Chip Carter Gaines; November 14, 1974 (age 51); Albuquerque, New Mexico, US
- Occupations: Entrepreneur, author, producer, reality star
- Years active: 2013–present
- Spouse: Joanna Gaines (m. 2003)
- Children: 5

Chip Carter Gaines (born November 14, 1974) is an American actor, producer, television personality, contractor, and author who, along with his wife Joanna Gaines, stars on the show Fixer Upper, which began airing on HGTV in 2013. By the time they filmed the pilot for Fixer Upper, the pair had already renovated 100 houses as a part of their business.

The Gaineses also helm the media brand Magnolia, which encompasses the Magnolia E-commerce site, the Hearth & Hand with Magnolia collection of home décor items for Target, the lifestyle magazine Magnolia Journal, the Magnolia Network television channel on which Fixer Upper and its spinoff series now air, the Magnolia Realty real estate brokerage (originally established by the pair in 2003), and the Magnolia App.

Gaines is also the New York Times bestselling author of two self-help books and the co-author of the memoir The Magnolia Story with Joanna.

== Personal life ==
Chip Gaines was born on November 14, 1974, in Albuquerque, New Mexico; at the age of eight, he moved to Colleyville, Texas. He attended Grapevine High School, where as a junior and senior he played second and third base for the school's baseball team. He then attended North Lake College for a year, where he continued to play baseball; during one of his games, he was scouted by Baylor Bears baseball coach Mickey Sullivan. Gaines transferred to Baylor for his sophomore year; shortly after, Sullivan retired, and Gaines got cut from the baseball team. He graduated from Baylor in 1998 with a Bachelor of Business Administration.

In 2001, Gaines met and began dating Joanna Stevens; they would later marry in 2003. The couple currently have five children and live in Waco, Texas.

== Early career ==
Gaines began his career in real estate by flipping houses while in his second year at Baylor. After he and Joanna married, the couple continued with his property flipping business, which later expanded to include a retail component. Before Fixer Upper, the Gaines had already established themselves as local real estate renovators in the Waco area, employing a small staff and having up to thirty different contractors.

== Fixer Upper and Magnolia brand ==
The pilot of Fixer Upper aired in May 2013, with the first full season beginning in April 2014. Season two began in January 2015; season three began in December 2015; and season four began in November 2016. The fifth and final season premiered on November 21, 2017.

Fixer Upper became popular soon after its debut, and the series is largely credited with the rise in popularity of "Farmhouse-chic" interior design in the late 2010s. In 2018, Zillow reported that homes with architectural features mentioned on the show, such as wainscoting, shiplap, clawfoot bathtubs, and barn doors, sold at an average of 30 percent above expected value. In addition, the show generated an increase in tourism and economic development in Waco, where the show was taped.

In 2016, Joanna and Chip Gaines started a quarterly lifestyle magazine Magnolia Journal, published by Meredith (later Dotdash Meredith).

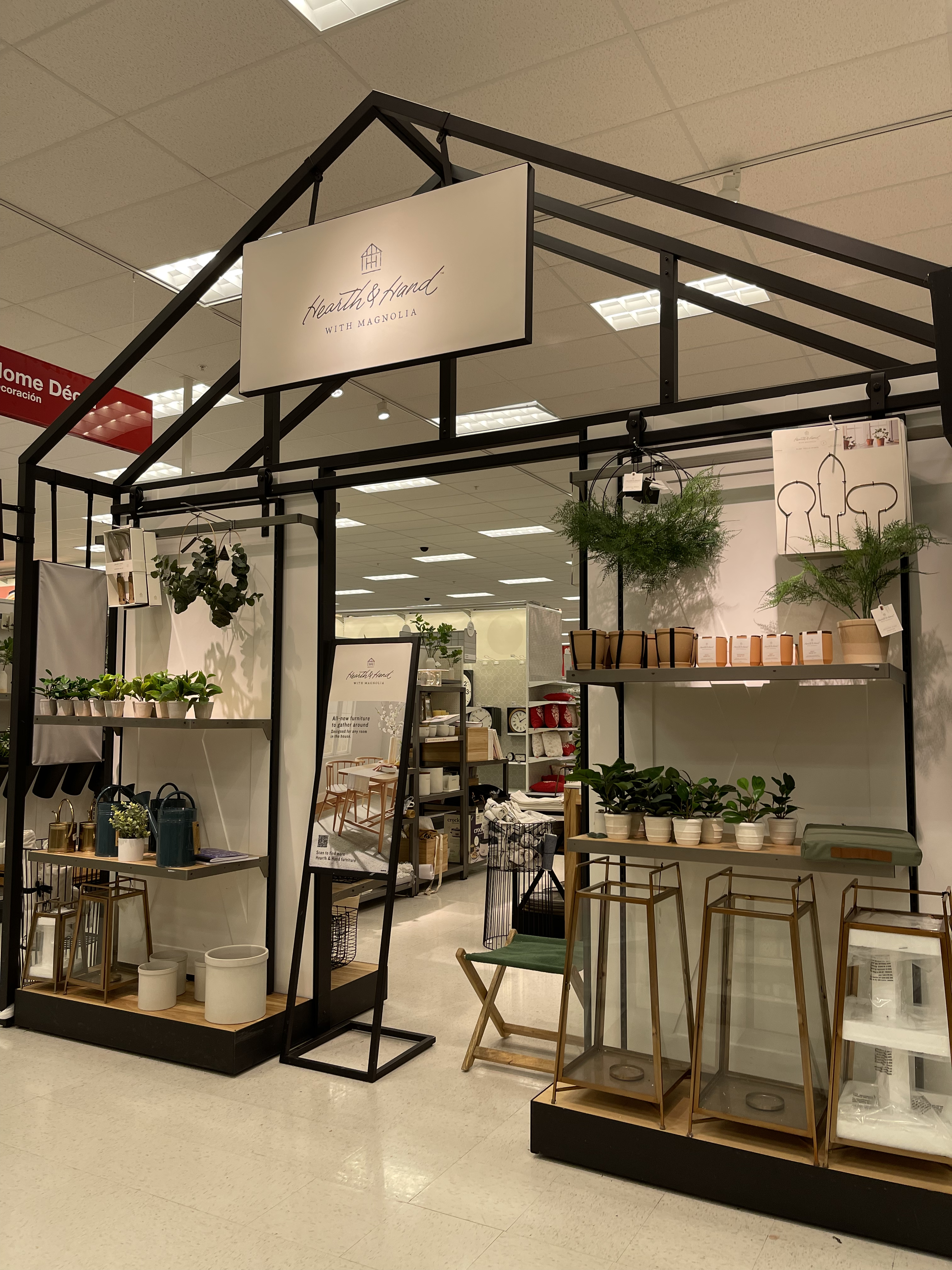
Hearth & Hand shop in Target in Santa Rosa, California

As of November 1, 2017, Joanna began selling her "Hearth & Hand with Magnolia" collection at Target stores. The collection, available in stores and online, features 300 pieces including bedding and lifestyle products. In February 2019, she created an exclusive collection for Anthropologie of "globally inspired" rugs and pillows.

On April 10, 2019, the Gaineses announced the launch of a "new media company." They will serve as chief creative officers and current HGTV president Allison Page will serve as president of the new joint venture, which will reportedly include a TV network and a streaming app.

In November 2019, the Gaineses opened a coffee shop, Magnolia Press, in Waco, Texas. The store was in addition to two others they already had, Magnolia Table and Silos Baking Co.

On April 26, 2020, the soft launch of the cable channel Magnolia Network kicked off with a four-hour presentation on the DIY Network: Magnolia Presents: A Look Back & A Look Ahead. Discovery Inc. announced that Fixer Upper would be revived as a launch program for Magnolia Network—a new channel overseen by the Gaineses that replaced HGTV's sister channel DIY Network.

DIY Network's rebranding as the Magnolia Network was originally going to be completed on October 4, 2020, but the date was pushed back due to the COVID-19 coronavirus pandemic. On August 4, 2020, it was announced that the network was scheduled to launch in 2021, with Fixer Upper resuming production before the launch of the new network on January 5, 2022. The revival, Fixer Upper: Welcome Home, premiered in January 2021 as part of the Magnolia Network soft launch on Discovery+. 2022 saw Fixer Upper: The Castle and 2023 will see Fixer Upper: The Hotel.

== Controversy and legal issues ==
Chip and Joanna Gaines belong to the evangelical Antioch Community Church, which has been criticized for its Bible based views of homosexuality. In 2016, the Gaineses were criticized after they appeared on video for a conversation with their local pastor Jimmy Seibert, of the Antioch International Movement of Churches, who had openly denounced homosexuality and gay marriage and professed his support for conversion therapy.

In June 2017, the Gaineses announced that they "settled with the United States Environmental Protection Agency over allegations that they violated rules for the safe handling of lead paint during home renovations." They paid $40,000 in fines and said they would comply with such regulations going forward and that they "remain committed to raising awareness in our community and our industry."

== Bibliography ==
Memoir

- The Magnolia Story (with Joanna Gaines) (2016) ISBN 9780718079185

Self-help books

- Capital Gaines (2017) ISBN 9780785216308
- No Pain No Gaines (2021) ISBN 9780785237914
