= Joanna Gaines =

American interior decorator and TV personality

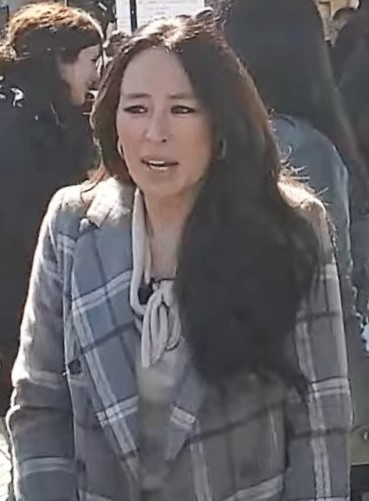
- Gaines in 2022
- Born: Joanna Lee Stevens; April 19, 1978 (age 48); Wichita, Kansas, U.S.
- Occupations: Interior decorator, Television personality, Author
- Spouse: Chip Gaines (m. 2003)
- Children: 5
- Website: magnolia.com

Joanna Lee Stevens Gaines (née Stevens; born April 19, 1978) is an American interior designer, television personality, and author. She co-hosted the home renovation show Fixer Upper, which began airing on HGTV in 2013, alongside her husband Chip Gaines.

The Gaineses also helm the media brand Magnolia, which encompasses the Magnolia E-commerce site, the Hearth & Hand with Magnolia collection of home decor items for Target, the lifestyle magazine Magnolia Journal, the Magnolia Network television channel on which Fixer Upper and its spinoff series now air, the Magnolia Realty real estate brokerage (originally established by the pair in 2003), and the Magnolia App.

Gaines is also the New York Times bestselling author or co-author of seven books including cookbooks, memoirs, a home design book, and children's books.

== Early life ==
Joanna Lee Stevens Gaines was born Joanna Lee Stevens on April 19, 1978, in Wichita, Kansas to Nan Stevens, a Korean immigrant, and Jerry Stevens, of Lebanese–German heritage. Her parents met in Seoul, South Korea in 1969 when Jerry was stationed there with the United States Army. In 1990, when she was 12 years old, the family settled in Austin, Texas. During her junior year of high school, they relocated to Waco, Texas, where her father opened a franchise Firestone Tire store, Jerry Stevens Firestone. Joanna appeared in television commercials for the business.

Gaines has said that throughout her childhood she was often the only Asian-American student at the schools she attended and experienced bullying and discrimination. After moving to Waco, she said her situation improved, and she was eventually named homecoming queen by fellow students.

After graduating from high school, Gaines attended Baylor University, where she earned a B.A. in Communication. She interned at Waco's KWTX television and KWBU radio stations and later spent a semester in New York City working as an intern on 48 Hours anchored by Dan Rather. She has said that during her studies she hoped to one day work as a broadcast journalist herself. She graduated from Baylor in 2001.

== Career ==
=== Early career ===
Shortly after her wedding, Joanna joined husband Chip Gaines's business flipping houses, and in 2003, the pair also opened the retail store Magnolia Market, which sold home goods. Joanna began keeping a blog about their experiences, which drew the attention of an executive at High Noon Entertainment, who suggested that the couple film a short video called a "sizzle reel" for a potential show. This concept eventually became HGTV's Fixer Upper.

=== Fixer Upper and Magnolia brand ===
The pilot of Fixer Upper aired in May 2013, with the first full season beginning in April 2014. They went on to film five more seasons with season two airing in January 2015, season three airing December 2015, season four airing November 2016, and the fifth and final season airing on November 21, 2017.

Fixer Upper became popular soon after its debut, and the series is largely credited with the rise in popularity of "Farmhouse-chic" interior design in the late 2010s. In 2018, Zillow reported that homes with architectural features mentioned on the show, such as wainscoting, shiplap, clawfoot bathtubs, and barn doors, sold at an average of 30 percent above expected value. In addition, the show generated an increase in tourism and economic development in Waco, where the show was taped.

In 2016, Joanna and Chip Gaines started a quarterly lifestyle magazine Magnolia Journal, published by Meredith (later Dotdash Meredith).

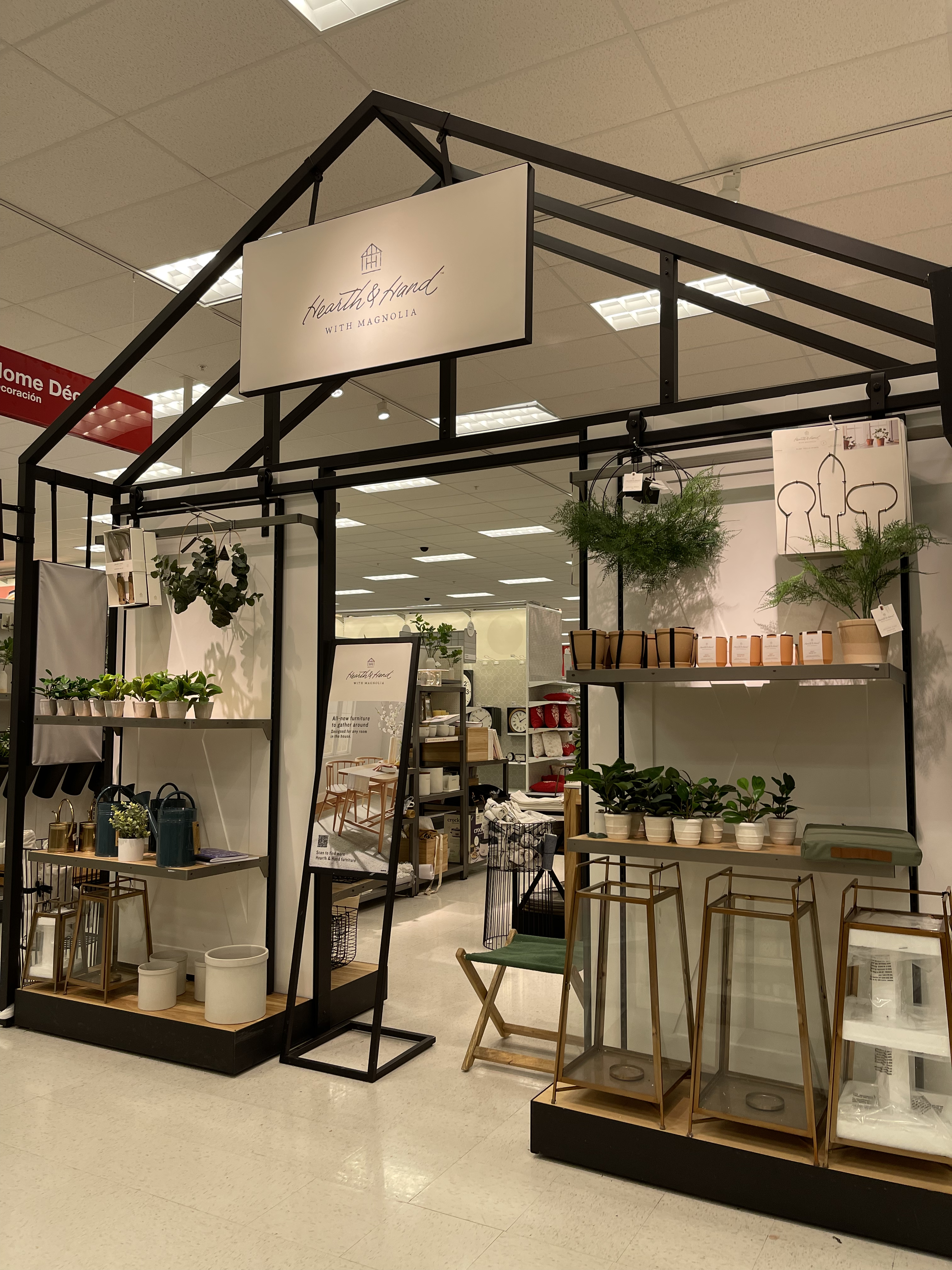
Hearth & Hand shop in Target in Santa Rosa, California

As of November 1, 2017, Joanna began selling her "Hearth & Hand with Magnolia" collection at Target Corporation stores. The collection, available in stores and online, features 300 pieces including bedding and lifestyle products. In February 2019, she created an exclusive collection for Anthropologie of "globally inspired" rugs and pillows. Gaines has also collaborated with the home textiles company Loloi on the "Magnolia Home by Joanna Gaines" rug collections.

In June 2017, the Gaineses announced that they "settled with the United States Environmental Protection Agency over allegations that they violated rules for the safe handling of lead paint during home renovations." They paid $40,000 in fines and said they would comply with such regulations going forward and that they "remain committed to raising awareness in our community and our industry."

On April 10, 2019, the Gaineses announced the launch of a "new media company." They would serve as chief creative officers, and current HGTV president Allison Page would serve as president of the new joint venture, which will reportedly include a TV network and a streaming app.

In November 2019, the Gaineses opened a coffee shop, Magnolia Press, in Waco, Texas. The store was in addition to two others they already had, Magnolia Table and Silos Baking Co.

On April 26, 2020, the soft launch of the cable channel Magnolia Network kicked off with a four-hour presentation on the DIY Network: Magnolia Presents: A Look Back & A Look Ahead. Discovery Inc. announced that Fixer Upper would be revived as a launch program for Magnolia Network—a new channel overseen by the Gaineses that replaced HGTV's sister channel DIY Network.

DIY Network's rebranding as the Magnolia Network was originally going to be completed on October 4, 2020, but the date was pushed back due to the COVID-19 coronavirus pandemic. On August 4, 2020, it was announced that the network was scheduled to launch in 2021, with Fixer Upper resuming production before the launch of the new network on January 5, 2022. The revival, Fixer Upper: Welcome Home, premiered in January 2021 as part of the Magnolia Network soft launch on Discovery+. 2022 saw Fixer Upper: The Castle and 2023 saw Fixer Upper: The Hotel. In November 2025, her eldest daughter, Ella, made her design debut on the series Fixer Upper: Colorado Mountain House, marking her first appearance as a designer on a Magnolia project.

In July 2025, the Gaineses drew criticism from some members of the Evangelical community after featuring a gay couple in their show Back to the Frontier.

== Personal life ==
Chip Gaines attended Baylor at the same time as Joanna in 1998, but the two never met while in school. They were introduced when Joanna worked at her father's tire shop, and Chip recognized her from the commercials for the business. They began dating, and in 2003, they were married in Waco, Texas.

They have five children.

Chip and Joanna Gaines belong to the evangelical Antioch Community Church, which has been criticized for its anti-gay views. In 2016, the Gaineses were criticized after they appeared on video for a conversation with their local pastor Jimmy Seibert, of the Antioch International Movement of Churches, who had openly denounced homosexuality and gay marriage and professed his support for conversion therapy.

== Bibliography ==
=== Memoirs ===
- The Magnolia Story (with Chip Gaines) (2016) ISBN 9780718079185
- The Stories We Tell (2022) ISBN 9781400333875

=== Cookbooks ===
- Magnolia Table (with Marah Stets) (2018) ISBN 9780062820150
- Magnolia Table, Volume 2 (2020) ISBN 9780062820181
- Magnolia Table, Volume 3 (2023) ISBN 9780062820174

=== Interior Design Books ===
- Homebody (2018) ISBN 9780062801975

=== Children's Books ===
- We Are the Gardeners (with her children) (2019) ISBN 9781400314225
- The World Needs Who You Were Made to Be (2020) ISBN 9781400314232
- The World Needs the Wonder You See (2025) ISBN 9781400247417
