= List of Fixer Upper episodes =

Fixer Upper is an American reality television series airing on HGTV starring Chip and Joanna Gaines, based in Waco, Texas.

== Series overview ==
Season	Episodes	Originally released	
Season	Episodes	First released	Last released
1	13	May 23, 2013	July 10, 2014
2	13	January 6, 2015	March 31, 2015
3	18	December 1, 2015	March 29, 2016
4	17	November 29, 2016	March 28, 2017
5	18	November 21, 2017	April 3, 2018

== Episodes ==
=== Season 1 (2013–14) ===
No.	Title	Original release date
1	"On the Hunt for a Fixer that Looks Old but Feels New in Castle Heights"	May 23, 2013
2	"Young Family Embraces Revitalization Efforts Making Their Own History"	April 24, 2014
3	"Nomadic Suburbanites Seek Unique Retro Residence"	May 1, 2014
4	"Client Rebuilds Life With Renovated Home"	May 8, 2014
5	"Can Big Budget Buy Elusive French Country in Waco"	May 15, 2014
6	"The Gaines' Carpenter and Family Seek Urban Environment"	May 22, 2014
7	"Family Returning to Waco Craves Cowboy Charm for Fixer Upper"	May 29, 2014
8	"Single Mom Starts New Life with Fixer Upper"	June 5, 2014
9	"Missionaries Enlist Kids to Find Retreat in Their Hometown of Waco, Texas"	June 12, 2014
10	"Couple Pursues Elusive Neighborhood Where Residents Never Leave"	June 19, 2014
11	"Physicians Seek Farmhouse for Growing Household"	June 26, 2014
12	"Professor and Family Crave Country Climate"	July 3, 2014
13	"Active Baby Boomers Seek Sanctuary Near Nature"	July 10, 2014

=== Season 2 (2015) ===
No. overall	No. in season	Title	Original release date
14	1	"Baby's Due Date Causes Rush to Renovate an Outdated Ranch"	January 6, 2015
15	2	"Searching for a New Homebuilder's Dream Home in an Old Neighborhood"	January 13, 2015
16	3	"Coffeehouse Owners Seek Home With Short Commute"	January 20, 2015
17	4	"Almost Empty Nesters Want Waterfront Home"	January 27, 2015
18	5	"First Time Buyers Take a Chance on a Vintage Fixer Upper"	February 3, 2015
19	6	"An Old Friend Who Returns to Waco Hopes to Find a Family-Friendly Fixer Upper"	February 10, 2015
20	7	"A College Chaplain Seeks Home to Keep the Peace"	February 17, 2015
21	8	"A Young Family Hopes for Fixer in Older Neighborhood"	February 24, 2015
22	9	"Island Transplants Want a House Close to Water in Waco"	March 3, 2015
23	10	"Country Life Attracts Couple to Small Town Texas"	March 10, 2015
24	11	"Couple With Baby on the Way Looks for a Funky Fixer Upper"	March 17, 2015
25	12	"Three Generations, One Fixer"	March 24, 2015
26	13	"Family Favors French Country Fixer"	March 31, 2015

=== Season 3 (2015–16) ===
No. overall	No. in season	Title	Original release date
27	1	"Convenience and Character are on the Wish List for a House Hunting Waco Couple"	December 1, 2015
28	2	"Finding Small Town Texas Charm for a Young Family"	December 8, 2015
29	3	"School Spirit Spurs Home Search"	December 15, 2015
30	4	"A Young Couple Hopes for a House with Old World Charm"	December 22, 2015
31	5	"A Family Searches a Small Town for the Ultimate Open Space"	December 29, 2015
32	6	"Making New Family Memories in Rural Texas"	January 5, 2016
33	7	"Lackluster Fixer Changes to Contemporary Charm for Young Family"	January 12, 2016
34	8	"Most Eligible Bachelor Finds the Perfect Home for Entertaining"	January 19, 2016
35	9	"Parents of College Students Find Fixer Close to Campus"	January 26, 2016
36	10	"Newlyweds Take On A Run-Down Fixer For Their Future Together"	February 2, 2016
37	11	"A One-Of-A-Kind Fixer Upper Gets A Modern Makeover"	February 9, 2016
38	12	"Chip and Jo Give a Run-Down Tiny House a Total Makeover for an Adventurous, Young Couple"	February 16, 2016
39	13	"Chip and Jo Bring a Relaxing Coastal Feel to a Rural Fixer"	February 23, 2016
40	14	"A Home Away From Home for the Holidays"	March 1, 2016
41	15	"Chip and Jo's Favorite Houses and Never-Before-Seen Outtakes"	March 8, 2016
42	16	"A Host & Hostess for the Bed & Breakfast"	March 15, 2016
43	17	"Single Foster Mom Finds Fixer for Future Family"	March 22, 2016
44	18	"Family Leaves the Bustling City for Quiet Simplicity"	March 29, 2016

=== Season 4 (2016–17) ===
No. overall	No. in season	Title	Original release date
45	1	"A Dog-Loving Couple Searches for Their First Home"	November 29, 2016
46	2	"After Recent Adoption, Family Finds Space to Thrive"	December 6, 2016
47	3	"Bright, Open Design Transforms Couple's First Home Together"	December 13, 2016
48	4	"Bloopers, Outtakes and More"	December 27, 2016
49	5	"Retiring to the Country"	January 3, 2017
50	6	"A Veteran Home Makeover"	January 10, 2017
51	7	"Traditional Goes Ultra Modern"	January 17, 2017
52	8	"Son Surprises His Family With a Major Renovation"	January 24, 2017
53	9	"Stately in White: From '80s to Elegant"	January 31, 2017
54	10	"The Floating Fixer Upper"	February 7, 2017
55	11	"Sweet Surprise at the Silos"	February 14, 2017
56	12	"Space In The Suburbs"	February 21, 2017
57	13	"Tight Budgets and Big Dreams"	February 28, 2017
58	14	"Second Chance at a Country Home"	March 7, 2017
59	15	"Rustic Italian Dream Home"	March 14, 2017
60	16	"The Flipper Upper"	March 21, 2017
61	17	"The Colossal Crawford Reno"	March 28, 2017

=== Season 5 (2017–18) ===
No. overall	No. in season	Title	Original release date
62	1	"Austin Couple Finds Waco Charm"	November 21, 2017
63	2	"Family Seeks Spacious Upgrade"	November 28, 2017
64	3	"New Chapter for Family of Four"	December 5, 2017
65	4	"Historic Tudor-Style Home for a New Family"	December 12, 2017
66	5	"Ranch House to Modern Mediterranean Retreat"	December 19, 2017
67	6	"Flip House To Family Project"	January 2, 2018
68	7	"New Chapter, New House"	January 9, 2018
69	8	"A Classic, Traditional Beauty"	January 16, 2018
70	9	"A Modern Cabin Makeover"	January 23, 2018
71	10	"Touchdown for a Family in Need"	January 30, 2018
72	11	"Big Budget for a Big House"	February 6, 2018
73	12	"Chip and Jo's Family Garden Project"	February 13, 2018
74	13	"A European Cottage-Style Dream Home With a View"	February 27, 2018
75	14	"All-American Farmhouse"	March 13, 2018
76	15	"A Downtown Loft Challenge for Chip and Jo"	March 13, 2018
77	16	"From City Life in Pakistan to a Farmhouse in Waco"	March 20, 2018
78	17	"Chip and Jo's Breakfast Joint"	March 27, 2018
79	18	"Rock Star Renovation"	April 3, 2018
