= Haji Bagcho =

Afghan convicted in the US of drug trafficking (born 1954)

Haji Bagcho Sherzai
- Born: 1954 (age 71–72); Nangarhar Province, Afghanistan
- Other names: Haji Bagh Chagul, Haji Bagcho
- Years active: 1990s–June 2009 (or more than £160,000,000)
- Known for: Drug trafficking
- Criminal status: Released
- Children: Sucha Gul, eldest son
- Relatives: Khadi Gul, younger brother

Haji Bagcho Sherzai, also known as Haji Bagh Chagul or Haji Bagcho (born 1954), is a convicted drug trafficker from Afghanistan. He is accused by the United States of having ties with the Taliban. He was convicted on March 13, 2012, by a jury in U.S. District Court for the District of Columbia of conspiracy, distribution of heroin for importation into the United States and narco-terrorism.

It was alleged that Bagcho exported heroin to more than twenty countries, including the United States. He faced a mandatory minimum sentence of 20 years and a maximum of life in prison. On June 12, 2012, a sentencing hearing was scheduled before Ellen Segal Huvelle in the United States District Court for the District of Columbia.

He is believed to have lived in the Marco village in Nangahar Province. He also owned a compound in Hayatabad, outside of Peshawar, Pakistan. He is married and has several children. His eldest son is believed to be named Sucha Gul.

In June 2009, Baghcho was arrested in Afghanistan and extradited to the US. Khadi Gul, his younger brother, denied that Bagcho had ever provided money to the Taliban.

Bagcho, who has been involved in the drug trafficking business since at least the 1990s, was ordered to forfeit $254,203,032 (more than £160,000,000).

With the help of cooperating witnesses, including Afghan National Security Forces (ANSF), and ledgers which were found during searches of his house, the Drug Enforcement Administration (DEA) prepared a major criminal case. One ledger, cataloguing Bagcho's activities during 2006, reflected heroin transactions of more than 123,000 kilograms, worth more than $250 million.

Bagcho used a portion of his drug proceeds to fund the Taliban governor of Nangarhar Province and two Taliban commanders responsible for insurgent activity in eastern Afghanistan with cash, weapons and other supplies so that they could continue their "jihad" against western troops and the Afghan government.

Based on heroin production statistics compiled by the United Nations Office of Drugs and Crime, in 2006, Bagcho's activities accounted for approximately 20% of the world's total production for that year.

As of June 2012, Bagcho is the second person to be convicted under the US narco-terrorism statute. He was released on December 16, 2022.
