= Dayna Curry =

American citizen

Dayna Curry (born November 4, 1971) is an American citizen, who was held a prisoner by Taliban government of Afghanistan in 2001. She befriended fellow aid worker Heather Mercer while attending Antioch Community Church in Waco, Texas. In 2001 the pair were part of a German-based missionary group called Shelter Now International when they were imprisoned by the Taliban for proselytization. Their captivity coincided with the September 11 attacks and the beginning of the US-led War in Afghanistan. In November 2001, Curry and her fellow workers were rescued from Taliban captivity by US military forces.

== Early life ==
Curry was raised in Forest Hills, Tennessee. In 1989, she graduated from Brentwood High School in Brentwood, Tennessee and went to Baylor University in Waco, Texas. A social work major, Dayna volunteered at the Waco Center for Youth (a residential facility treats teenagers with emotional and behavioral problems) while she was attending Baylor. After graduation, Curry took a job as a social worker at a high school for troubled teens in Waco.

Dayna Curry and Heather Mercer got to know each other in Waco when they both joined the Antioch Community Church, an evangelical, non-denominational church.

== Imprisonment and rescue ==
In March 2001, Curry and Heather Mercer traveled to Afghanistan to join the German-based aid agency Shelter Now International, which worked with Afghan women and children in Kabul. Their colleagues included four German and two Australian aid workers. On August 3, 2001, Curry and her fellow aid workers were arrested by the ruling Taliban regime for allegedly preaching Christianity in the strict Islamic state. The two were visiting a private home in Kabul when they were arrested. The Taliban, which forbade foreigners from visiting local homes, allege that the two women went beyond their activities with helping the needy and began spreading the Christian gospel, a crime under Taliban law. The women had been showing the Jesus film.

A joint trial for the imprisoned aid workers began September 1 in Kabul. At first, it appeared that their punishment might be minor, a short time in prison followed by expulsion from the country. Then came the September 11 attacks on the United States. Their trial was suspended, and their relatives were ordered out of Kabul. After more than three months of confinement in Taliban prisons they were picked up on November 15, 2001, by the U.S. military.

== Return to the United States ==
After their release and subsequent return to the United States, Curry and Mercer met with President George W. Bush at the White House on November 26, 2001. The two co-authored a book entitled Prisoners of hope: the story of our captivity and freedom in Afghanistan, that was published in 2002.

== See also ==
- Prisoners of Hope
