= Shelter Now =

Christian humanitarian aid organization

Shelter Now (also known as "Shelter Now International" and "SNI")
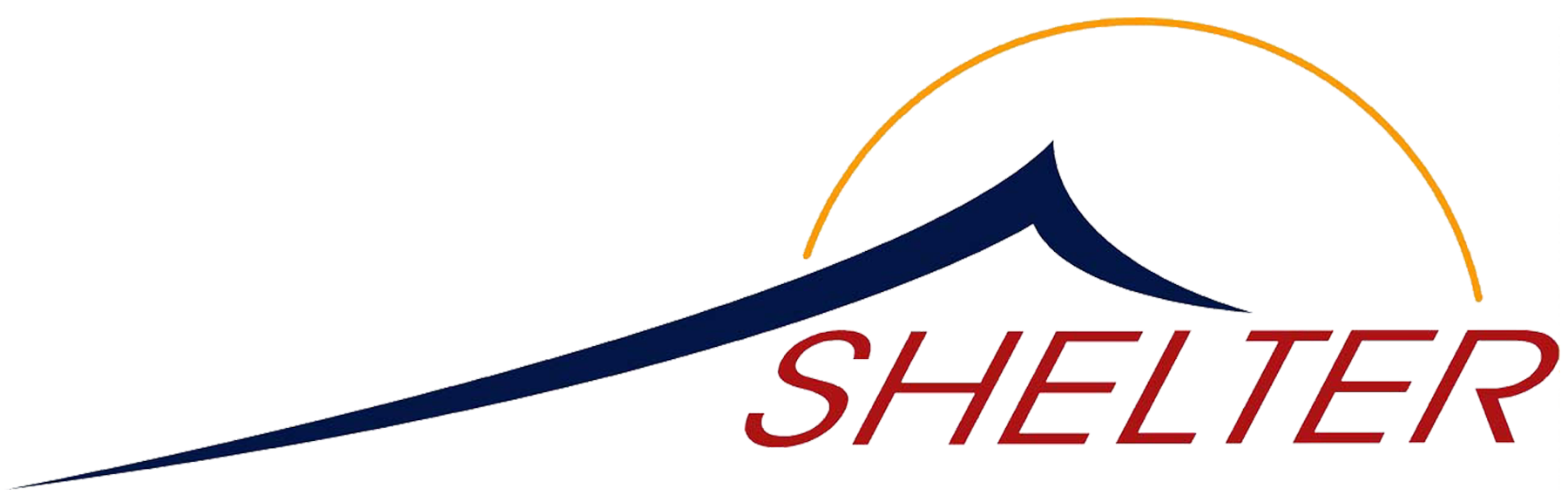
- Founded: late 1970s, formally registered as an international aid organization in 1983
- Founder: Douglas Layton, Georg Taubmann
- Type: Christian humanitarian aid, development, and relief organization
- Purpose: housing construction, rebuilding, shelter
- Location: Germany (Braunschweig, Sulzbach-Rosenberg)
- Origins: Merger of various Christian humanitarian aid societies sharing a goal to do work in Afghanistan
- Region served: Afghanistan, Pakistan, Iraqi Kurdistan
- Method: Assisting war refugees by rebuilding communities
- Website: www.shelter-now.org

Shelter Now (also known as Shelter Now International and SNI) is an international Christian humanitarian aid organization based in Germany and with operations focused in Afghanistan. Shelter Now began its work in the late 1970s, but did not formally register as an international aid organization until 1983. From 1988, the organization's activities focused on providing aid to Afghan refugees who were displaced during the Soviet–Afghan War, which lasted from 1979 to 1989. The organization's work included developing factories for producing roof-building materials and rebuilding irrigation systems.

In August 2001—just six weeks before the September 11 attacks—Shelter Now garnered international attention when the Taliban arrested two Americans, two Australians, and four Germans working in Afghanistan for the organization, on charges of proselytism. Some 100 days later, on November 15, the aid workers were freed from Taliban custody by Northern Alliance forces and U.S. Special Forces.

== History ==
The activities of Shelter Now have varied over the years and have been affected by such factors as the availability of resources, the attitudes of local populations and governments, and the effects of armed conflict.

=== 1990-2000 ===
Shelter Now International was based in Wisconsin until 1990. Shelter Now's aid work in Afghanistan has included contracting with Afghanaid to build homes for local landowners in exchange for their promise not to cultivate opium on their land. A demonstration home constructed by Shelter Now was also used temporarily as an office by Afghanaid fieldworkers in the Achin District in 1990. In addition, Shelter Now was instrumental in the construction of health clinics and schools in the Achin District. In Paktia Province, Shelter Now assisted with the production of concrete beams needed for building construction. In Balkh Province, the organization completed a program for animal vaccinations.

In April 1990, Islamic fundamentalists connected to the "Islamic Youth Movement" launched a campaign against education programs offered by aid organizations from Western countries. Shelter Now, specifically, was targeted because of its Christian nature. On April 26, 1990, the Shelter Now International project office at Nasir Bagh refugee camp in Peshawar, Pakistan, was attacked. Subsequently, Islamists stole 75 tons of powered milk, stole or destroyed 19 vehicles, and destroyed the Center's vehicle workshop. The Islamists opposed the Westerners' involvement in the region, especially their provision of soap and a bathroom for women, which was perceived as an attempt to westernize them. On June 16, 1990, Shelter Now International's director, Dr. Thor Armstrong, was stopped by armed Islamists while driving in the area of Peshawar with his son as a passenger. The men sprayed Armstrong's car with bullets when he refused to pull over. Neither occupant of the vehicle was injured, though the attack resulted in Armstrong moving away from Peshawar with his family the next day.

Beginning in about 1992, the organization operated four roof-beam factories in Afghanistan, which is useful for low-cost construction.

In 1996, aid workers working for Shelter Now had to flee from Iraqi Kurdistan to the Turkish border due to violence related to the Iraqi Kurdish Civil War.

=== 2001 Taliban imprisonment of Shelter Now employees ===
On August 3, 2001, the then-ruling Taliban police raided the Kabul offices of Shelter Now and arrested two Shelter Now aid workers, Heather Mercer and Dayna Curry. In the following days, the Taliban arrested 22 more Shelter Now aid workers, including four Germans (among them the group's German director, Georg Taubmann), two Australians, and 16 Afghans. The Taliban accused the aid workers of being in possession of Bibles and Christian literature and videos in Dari and Pashto, and charged them with attempting to convert Muslims to Christianity, which is a crime in Afghanistan subject to severe punishment.

At the time, the organization's Afghanistan director, Esteban Witzemann, responded:

There might be some [material] for private use ... but what they are accused of, that they are distributing hundreds of Bibles and Christian literature and they are trying to persuade people to leave Islam and become Christians, all this is nonsense and not true.

The situation became dire when, less than six weeks later, the September 11 attacks occurred. Soon after the attacks, it became clear that the Saudi national and leader of the salafi jihadist organization Al-Qaeda, Osama bin Laden, was behind the attacks, and that he was residing in Afghanistan. When the Taliban refused demands by the United States that Bin Laden be extradited, the continued imprisonment of the 8 western aid workers became a point of serious tension in the conflict that was to follow 9/11. In mid-August, the Taliban looted Shelter Now factories and stole approximately $45,000 worth of equipment, including a Toyota pickup truck, two generators, several cement mixers, and manufacturing tools. On November 15, the eight westerners were freed from Taliban captivity near Ghazni by forces from the Northern Alliance. The workers were then airlifted by U.S. Special Forces helicopters to Islamabad, Pakistan.

Following his release, Georg Taubmann, addressed the allegations of proselytism in an interview for the magazine Christianity Today in January 2003, stating:

I do not use this word evangelism, and I never use especially the word missions. This could mean in America that people preach the gospel, make campaigns, or whatever. We are all very committed Christians, and as I said before, everyday you probably have a chance [to]... talk about religious things. There are Afghans who come to us and ask us questions, and they want to know more. And since we are Christians, we talk about it. And we always emphasize that people have a right to hear... You don't have to go out and do what we call evangelistic things. You just need to live your life as a Christian, and this attracts people, and they want to know more about what you believe in. People simply ask you, "Are you Muslim? Why are you not a Muslim?" And then you can talk. And it's plain to them why you're not a Muslim and what you believe in.

=== 2002-present ===
Shelter Now resumed operations in Afghanistan in the summer of 2002, where it has assisted with reconstruction, clinics, schools, and other forms of humanitarian aid ever since. In January 2006, the organization assisted with the U.N. effort to provide residents of Kashmir and Pakistan's North-West Frontier Province with essential aid to survive the winter after sustaining crippling damage on October 8 from a 7.6-magnitude earthquake. Shelter Now provided tents equipped with stoves, blankets, and mattresses.

Since 2014, Shelter Now has provided support in Iraqi Kurdistan to refugees displaced by the Islamic State. The organization remains active in Afghanistan. The group receives donations from churches in both Europe and the United States.
