= Fixer Upper (TV series) =

American reality television series

- Genre: Real estate
- Presented by: Chip Gaines; Joanna Gaines
- Country of origin: United States
- Original language: English
- No. of seasons: 5
- No. of episodes: 79

Production
- Production location: Waco, Texas
- Running time: 43 minutes
- Production company: High Noon Entertainment

Original release
- Network: HGTV
- Release: May 23, 2013 – April 3, 2018

Fixer Upper is an American reality television series about home design and renovation that aired on HGTV. The series starred Chip and Joanna Gaines, a married couple who own a home renovation and redecoration business in Waco, Texas. The show's pilot aired in May 2013, with the first full season beginning in April 2014. Season two began in January 2015; season three began in December 2015; and season four began in November 2016. The final season premiered on November 21, 2017.

Fixer Upper became popular soon after its debut, and the series is largely credited with the rise in popularity of "farmhouse-chic" interior design in the late 2010s. In 2018, Zillow reported that homes with architectural features mentioned on the show, such as wainscoting, shiplap, clawfoot bathtubs, and barn doors, sold at an average of 30 percent above expected value. In addition, the show generated an increase in tourism and economic development in Waco, where the show was recorded.

In 2020, Discovery, Inc. announced that Fixer Upper would be revived as a launch program for Magnolia Network—a new channel overseen by the Gaineses that replaced HGTV's sister channel DIY Network. The revival, Fixer Upper: Welcome Home, premiered in January 2021 as part of the Magnolia Network soft launch on Discovery+. Fixer Upper: The Castle aired in 2022, and Fixer Upper: The Hotel began airing in 2023. On March 5, 2024, it was announce that Fixer Upper: The Lakehouse would premiere in June 2024. It was announced in October 2025 that Fixer Upper: Colorado Mountain Home would premiere in December 2025. This would mark the first home outside of Texas in the Fixer Upper series.

== Premise ==
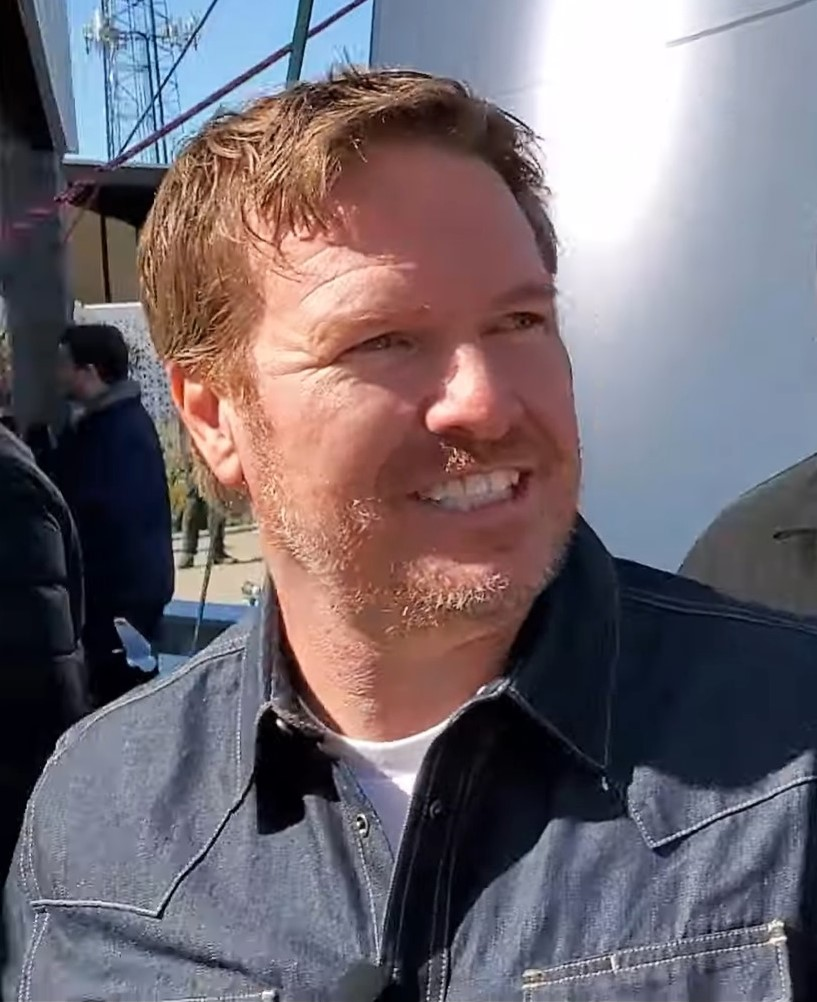
Chip Gaines in 2022

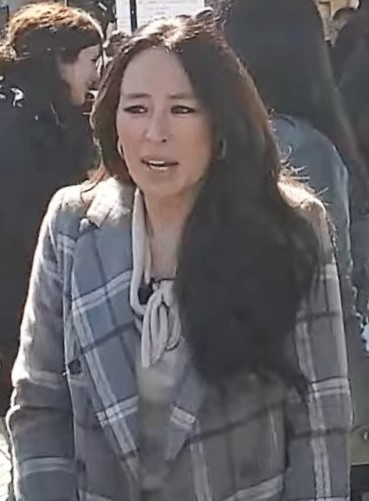
Joanna Gaines in 2022

Fixer Upper is produced by High Noon Entertainment producers Scott Feeley and Jim Berger, producers of the cooking show Cake Boss. Prior to Fixer Upper, the Gaineses worked with clients on buying and remodeling homes. In total, the couple worked on over 100 homes. On the show, they start by showing a couple three potential homes for purchase in central Texas, each of which requires a varying amount of repair or renovation. Once the couple chooses their home, Joanna designs it and Chip is the lead contractor. The buyers typically have an overall budget of under $200,000 with at least $30,000 in renovations.

== Episodes ==
Season	Episodes	Originally released	
Season	Episodes	First released	Last released
1	13	May 23, 2013	July 10, 2014
2	13	January 6, 2015	March 31, 2015
3	18	December 1, 2015	March 29, 2016
4	17	November 29, 2016	March 28, 2017
5	18	November 21, 2017	April 3, 2018

== Spin-off ==
In March 2017, it was announced that Chip and Joanna Gaines would be getting a Fixer Upper spin-off series titled Fixer Upper: Behind the Design. The half-hour show showcased how Joanna comes up with the designs seen on Fixer Upper. The show premiered on April 10, 2018.

== Magnolia Network ==
On April 10, 2019, the Gaineses announced the launch of a "new media company" of which they would serve as chief creative officers and then-HGTV president Allison Page would serve as president. This company would reportedly include a TV network and a streaming app.

On April 26, 2020, at 5 p.m. EDT, the soft launch of the cable network Magnolia Network kicked off with a four-hour presentation on the DIY Network: Magnolia Presents: A Look Back & A Look Ahead. DIY Network's rebranding as the Magnolia Network was originally going to be completed on October 4, 2020, but the date was pushed back due to the COVID-19 pandemic. On August 4, 2020, it was announced that the network was scheduled to launch in 2021.

A revival series, Fixer Upper: Welcome Home, premiered in January 2021 as part of the Magnolia Network soft launch on Discovery+. Fixer Upper: The Lakehouse premiered in June 2024.

== Legacy ==
Fixer Upper is largely credited with the rise in popularity of "farmhouse-chic" interior design in the late 2010s. In 2018, Zillow reported that homes with architectural features mentioned on the show, such as wainscoting, shiplap, clawfoot bathtubs, and barn doors, sold at an average of 30 percent above expected value. In addition, the show has generated an increase in tourism and economic development in Waco, Texas, where the show was filmed, extending the explosive growth of the Austin market area up the I-35 corridor of the communities towards the Dallas–Fort Worth metroplex.

Thanks to the show's popularity, the homes featured on the show have become desirable to either buy or rent. At least six of the homes have been available to rent through Airbnb or VRBO. As of 2016, owners are renting them from $250 to $350 a night.

Selling the homes renovated by the Gaineses has also become a way for show participants to make a profit. The Bicycle House featured in season 1, episode 12 went up for sale in 2016 for $350,000 after being purchased for less than $50,000. It was also available for rent on VRBO for $250 a night. The Barndominium featured in season 3, episode 6 went up for sale in April 2017 for $1.2 million.

== Legal issues ==
On April 27, 2017, Chip Gaines was named in a fraud lawsuit filed by former business partners. The former partners alleged that Gaines persuaded them to sell their interest in Magnolia Realty to him for $2,500 each without disclosing plans that had been in the works to develop the Fixer Upper reality television show. In February 2020, a judge threw out the lawsuit, but the judge did allow Gaines's defamation countersuit against his former business partners to move forward. On July 14, 2023, Gaines's former business partners reached an out-of-court settlement with Gaines.

In June 2017, Chip and Joanna Gaines announced that they "settled with the United States Environmental Protection Agency over allegations that they violated rules for the safe handling of lead paint during home renovations." They paid $40,000 in fines and will comply with such regulations going forward, and "remain committed to raising awareness in our community and our industry."
