= Antioch International Movement of Churches =

Network of evangelical churches

Antioch Movement
- Classification: Protestant
- Orientation: Evangelical
- President: Jimmy Seibert
- U.S. Director: Drew Steadman
- Headquarters: Waco, Texas
- Founder: Jimmy Seibert
- Congregations: 125+
- Official website: antioch.org

The Antioch International Movement of Churches is a global network of evangelical churches headquartered in Waco, Texas. The Waco location was founded in 1999 by Jimmy Seibert. Antioch Ministries International has been listed as a 501(c)(3) organization since 1993. The movement strongly focuses on missions-based evangelism and global church planting. Antioch describes itself as non-denominational.

Antioch received significant international press coverage in 2001 after two of its overseas missionaries, Dayna Curry and Heather Mercer, were arrested by the Taliban in Afghanistan for "preaching Christianity." Antioch's relationship with reality TV stars Chip and Joanna Gaines also thrust the church into the spotlight as a result of the movement’s position on same-sex marriage and related issues. As of 2024, the Antioch Movement's public network listed 54 locations (some of which do not carry the Antioch name).

== Origins ==
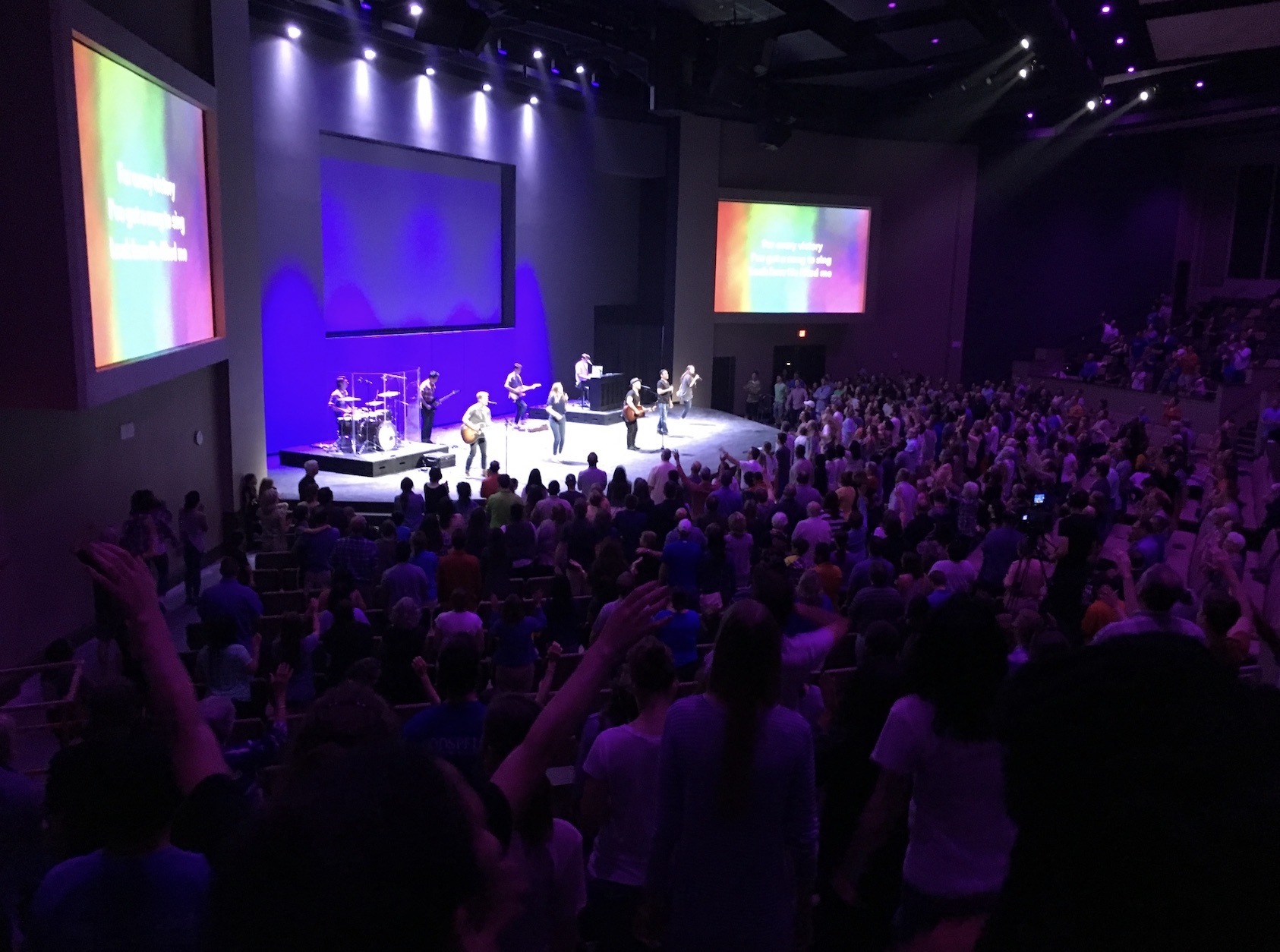
Worship during the Sunday service at Antioch Community Church of Waco

Antioch Waco, which serves as the headquarters of the Antioch movement, was founded in April 1999. Founder Jimmy Seibert had been an Associate Pastor at Highland Baptist Church in Waco since 1988, where he introduced the concept of life groups (small prayer groups) and started a missionary school called Antioch Ministries International. Seibert left Highland amicably in April 1999, with Highland's Head Pastor Barry Camp giving members of Highland the option to move to the new Antioch church. By April 2001, after meeting in several locations around Waco, Antioch permanently settled at a location in a racially diverse neighborhood in north Waco, with a plan to contribute to "renewal and rejuvenation" in the area.

Antioch's Waco location subsequently started dozens of Antioch churches, both in the United States and internationally, and grew to be one of the largest congregations in Waco. By 2019, Antioch had over 5,000 seats in its Waco congregation, started 28 churches in the US and had 80 teams in 40 countries internationally.

In 2022, Antioch commissioned All Peoples Church in San Diego as an independent church-planting movement.

== Jimmy Seibert ==
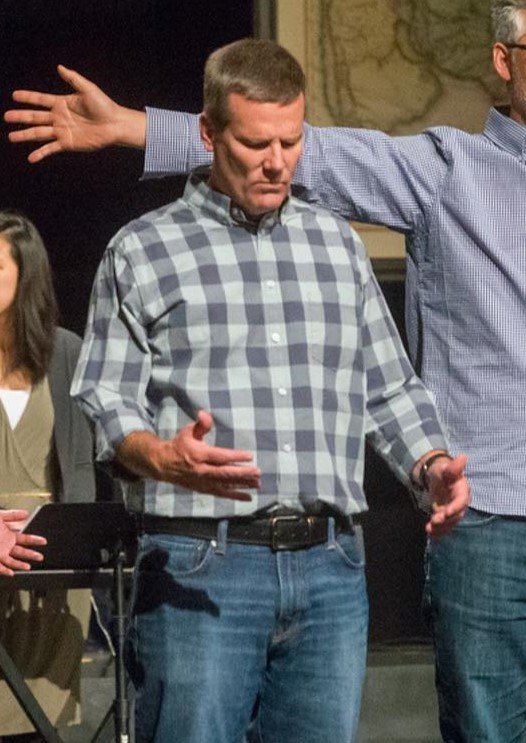
Antioch Community Church's Jimmy Seibert

Jimmy Seibert says he did not grow up in the church. He was involved with Campus Crusade for Christ while he was attending Baylor University in 1985, and was influenced by its evangelistic mission. Despite his initial skepticism about this mission, it eventually became a part of what motivates his own ministry. In 1986, Seibert graduated from Baylor University with a Bachelor of Business Administration degree (BBA). Then, after pursuing business for two years, he became a pastor at Highland Baptist church in 1988—first a co-director of evangelism, then a college pastor, and finally a pastor of ministries.

=== Politics ===
During the 2016 United States presidential election, Seibert preached about the election, calling both Hillary Clinton and Donald Trump "very flawed, immoral candidates." Seibert urged Christians to participate in the election, and to consider a number of issues including abortion, religious freedom, "traditional marriage," the "value of the individual," care for immigrants and foreigners, and concerns about transgender children choosing which restroom to use. Siebert expressed concerns about the marginalization of Christians who hold traditional views. He also expressed horror, disgust, and outrage with late-term abortions. Seibert said this was a typical election sermon and was not meant to influence people to vote for Trump.

== Life groups and discipleship practices ==
Antioch Waco organizes a network of small groups they call "life groups", which meet weekly in homes. Members compare life groups to the small gatherings of Christians that were common in the New Testament church. As Seibert describes this, "Our Sundays are just times of celebration or vision but not really the make or break of everything ... We really emphasize what's happening in the small groups as the core of our church." Seibert pioneered this concept at Highland Baptist Church, and subsequently brought the same structure to Antioch.

Sociologists Kevin Dougherty and Andrew Whitehead note that these groups are "widespread in megachurches" where they are especially significant as an organizational strategy to increase participation. They note that "[o]ne in five American worshippers belongs to such a group" and that "being involved in a small, intimate gathering with fellow worshippers is related to positive religious outcomes for individuals." In 2011, Dougherty estimated that, at Antioch Waco in particular, as many as 80% of members were "intimately involved" in these groups. According to Dougherty, this high participation rate has made Antioch look "almost cult-like in intensity" to some "outsiders," even though the small groups are viewed by "insiders" as central to their membership in the church.

In 2019, Buzzfeed News reported that some unnamed former members said they felt pressured to spend more time and money on Antioch to recruit and disciple new members.

== International missionary efforts ==
Antioch International places a high priority on starting new churches around the world, a focus that grew out of the missionary school that Seibert started while at Highland Baptist. Antioch regularly hosts the World Mandate missions conference, which attracts attendees from around the globe, with satellite locations in twelve other cities.

Antioch's missionary school, Antioch Discipleship School, describes itself as a "spiritual development program" that teaches Christians how to "live on mission." Students range widely in age and occumpation, meet twice a week, and complete an "international outreach trip" at the end of the semester where they partner with long-term missionaries.

Antioch sponsors a ministry called "Haiti Transformed," which provides housing and humanitarian aid to victims of the 2010 earthquake in Haiti, including work in the Leogane area.

Antioch contributes to Restoration Gateway, a church planting and orphanage project located in Uganda. As of 2011, the project housed 55 kids from ages 5 to 12, and planned to take on as many as 300 orphans. The project runs a brick-production business, and uses this business to provide education and jobs skills to locals. As of 2011, the project had built 14 homes, as well as an auditorium, gymnasium, and school, with plans to complete a $750,000 hospital and dental office serving nearby villagers.

Antioch provides “home groups” for international students, led by international students in their homes, that focus on sharing food from their home countries, bible study, and prayer.

In August 2001, Antioch missionaries Heather Mercer and Dayna Curry were among eight aid workers arrested and imprisoned in Afghanistan by the Taliban on charges of "preaching Christianity". Mercer, Curry, and the other workers were held for 104 days, attracting international media attention. Taliban law forbids foreigners from propagating a religion other than Islam. The penalty for an Afghan who converts to Christianity is death, but Curry told the Waco Tribune-Herald that they warned Afghans of the dangers of asking them about Christianity, and they "never wanted to put anyone in danger unless they also knew possible consequences." Mercer and Curry would go on to co-author a book together about their experiences in Afghanistan, titled Prisoners of Hope, while continuing to do work in Afghanistan on behalf of Antioch.

Following the 2004 Sri Lankan tsunami, Antioch sent at least a dozen American Antioch members to Sri Lanka with tens of thousands of dollars in aid money and 2,000 pounds of medical supplies. Team leader Pat Murphy identified the group as a humanitarian aid group and not a church group. However, Antioch's website subsequently said the team was one of four teams sent to Sri Lanka who have convinced dozens of people to "come to Christ." Some Christian leaders in Sri Lanka called this unethical. They expressed concern that mixing proselytization with humanitarian aid violates Red Cross guidelines followed by other religious aid groups, and could provoke violence from the Buddhist majority. Jimmy Seibert responded to the controversy by stating that Antioch sees aid work and missionary work as "one thing, not two separate things" and that he hopes that Christians always bring their faith to their work.

== Position on homosexuality and marriage ==
Antioch believes that homosexuality is a sin. Seibert says Antioch defines marriage as "[o]ne man, one woman for life", a position he says is "straight from the Scripture". Seibert has suggested that 90% of people in a same-sex relationship were “abused in some way" and told Waco business owners not to relax attitudes regarding homosexuality. He praised those willing to take a stand, even if it were to cost them money or lead to the loss of their business.

Antioch Waco also has a partnership with Living Hope Ministries, an organization that Baptist News Global says practices "sexual orientation change efforts". Dennis Wiles, the lead pastor of First Baptist Church Arlington, (where Living Hope is based and rents office space) insisted that Living Hope Ministries does not practice "conversion therapy".

Antioch's position on LGBT issues led to controversy in 2016, when Buzzfeed published an article on Antioch's connection with HGTV Stars Chip and Joanna Gaines (hosts of the reality show Fixer Upper). The article covered the Gaines' relationship with Antioch Waco, Seibert's stance on homosexuality, and posed the question whether the Gaines shared Antioch's position on same-sex relationships. In response, Seibert made a statement, reinforcing his beliefs that Antioch is not "anti-gay," but "pro-helping people in their journey to find out who God is and who He has made them to be." Buzzfeed News subseqeuntly reported that some unnamed former members said the church made them feel unwelcome for coming out as gay.

== Impact on local community ==
Antioch chose its location in north Waco to contribute to a project of "neighborhood renewal and rejuvenation." According to the Waco Tribune-Herald, Antioch was one of four churches whose "social justice-minded" members moved to North Waco to build relationships and participate in "neighborhood ministries and clean-up projects."

The church has since started several "community outreach" programs. These include a "financial restoration" ministry that offers faith-based financial education, a summer meals program that offers free lunches to school children, a sport ministry program that offers summer sports programs for kids, a mentoring program focused on child literacy, and a mental health support group. In addition, Antioch has regularly hosted a missions conference that, according to the Director of the Waco Convention and Visitor's Bureau, brings significant economic stimulus to the local economy.

By 2011 Antioch announced expansion plans to spend $11 million on its own church building at its Waco headquarters location. The $11 million construction project would nearly triple the size of the church. Renovations would focus on the main sanctuary and a building intended for children's programs. Five percent of the revenue would be designated for poverty programs. When complete, it is estimated the new building's capacity could handle in upwards of 5000 attendees.

The church had attracted more than 100 families to the area as of 2011. The Waco Tribune-Herald quoted two long-time residents as welcoming the newcomers, and praising the results of the attempts to restore the neighborhood. By contrast, in 2019, Buzzfeed News raised concerns about "gentrification" as a result of Antioch and the Gaines' "restoration" efforts, comparing Antioch Waco, Baylor University, and Magnolia (Chip and Joanna Gaines' company) to a "company town" that influences the spread of "power and prosperity" in Waco.

=== Addiction recovery programs ===
Antioch Waco runs two residential addiction recovery programs, one for men and one for women. Mercy House, the men's program, offers six- to eighteen-month programs involving discipleship, counseling, and work therapy for addiction. Grace House, the women's program, was opened in 2009, and offers a free twelve-month recovery program that focuses on "group therapy, spiritual guidance, life skills and wellness."

=== Anti-sex-trafficking work ===
In 2012, Antioch started a ministry called UnBound, which aims to assist the victims of sex trafficking by providing financial resources and raising awareness. According to the Waco Tribune-Herald, UnBound is "a leader in the fight against the dehumanizing sex trade." UnBound has hosted meetings of the statewide anti-Trafficking group, thee Heart of Texas Human Trafficking Coalition. UnBound has also received praise from Waco police Sergeant Jason Lundquist, who said police "rely on the help from UnBound and other resources in the community" in their fight against sex trafficking. County District Attorney Abel Reyna praised UnBound, along with others in their coalition, for "making prosecutors' jobs easier."

In 2017 Antioch Waco's own community outreach pastor, Edward Ignacio Espinosa, was arrested for paying prostitutes for sex at a local massage parlor. Women working at the massage parlor were forced victims of human trafficking. After Espinosa confessed, he was placed on administrative leave and later resigned. UnBound assisted the trafficked women who were found at the parlor.

== Related ministries ==
- Grace Alliance Mental Health, a support group ministry for members, by members, who suffer mental health that are intended to "fill in the gaps" of overloaded local mental health care facilities and professionals.
- Haiti Transformed, a ministry located in Léogâne, Haiti. In 2011, Haiti Transformed planned to construct over 100 homes in Léogâne, more than 30 through a partnership with the Passion Movement.
- Living Hope Ministries, an organization that "practices sexual orientation change efforts" are partners with three churches in the Antioch Movement: Antioch Waco, Antioch College Station, and Antioch Norman.
- Restoration Gateway, a church planting and orphanage project located in Uganda.
