= Heather Mercer =

American aid worker

Heather Marie Mercer (born 1976) is an American who was one of 24 aid workers arrested in August 2001 by the Taliban in Afghanistan in connection with the Antioch International Movement of Churches and Germany-based Christian aid organization Shelter Now International. She, along with seven other Western aid workers and their sixteen Afghan coworkers, was arrested on August 3, 2001, and put on trial for violating the Taliban prohibition against proselytism. She was held captive in Kabul until anti-Taliban forces freed her in November 2001. She co-authored a book with her fellow captive, Dayna Curry, published in 2002 and entitled Prisoners of hope: the story of our captivity and freedom in Afghanistan.

She later founded Global Hope, including the Hope Afghanistan Foundation andHope4Iraq.

== Afghan trial ==
Mercer arrived in Afghanistan in March 2001. She and another American, Dayna Curry, were sent by Antioch Community Church and working for a Germany-based aid group called Shelter Now International.

On August 3, 2001, the Taliban arrested the two women. After their arrest, the Taliban raided the group's offices and arrested the six other aid workers that Mercer and Curry were teamed up with.

Their trial began on September 1, 2001. On September 13, the trial was suspended and relatives of the detained aid workers were ordered to leave the country. The trial resumed on September 30. On October 6, the Taliban made an offer to release Mercer and Curry if the United States stopped its military action in Afghanistan. During her captivity, she met the British journalist Yvonne Ridley, who was arrested near the Pakistan border and brought to the same prison in Kabul. Ridley informed her about the September 11 attacks and the subsequent military actions against the Taliban regime in Afghanistan. On November 15, the women, along with the six other imprisoned aid workers, were freed from prison by anti-Taliban forces and flown to safety in Islamabad, Pakistan.

After their release, and upon their return to the U.S., Mercer and Curry met with President George W. Bush at the White House on November 26, 2001.
