= Entertainment Weekly =

American digital magazine

- Issue 1 (February 16, 1990), cover featuring singer k.d. lang
- Chief editor: Patrick Gomez
- Former editors: Rick Tetzeli, Jess Cagle, Matt Bean, Henry Goldblatt, JD Heyman, Mary Margaret
- Categories: Entertainment
- Frequency: Weekly (1990–2019); Monthly (2019–present)
- Total circulation: 1.8 million (2013)
- Founder: David Morris
- First issue: February 16, 1990; 36 years ago
- Final issue: April 2022; 4 years ago (print only)
- Company: People Inc.
- Country: United States
- Based in: New York City
- Language: English
- Website: ew.com
- ISSN: 1049-0434 (print); 2169-3188 (web)
- OCLC: 21114137

Entertainment Weekly (sometimes abbreviated as EW) is an American digital-only entertainment magazine based in New York City, published by People Inc., that covers film, television, music, Broadway theatre, books, and popular culture. The print magazine debuted on February 16, 1990, in New York City, and ceased publication in 2022.

Different from celebrity-focused publications such as Us Weekly, People, and In Touch Weekly, EW primarily concentrates on entertainment media news and critical reviews; unlike Variety and The Hollywood Reporter, which were primarily established as trade magazines aimed at industry insiders, EW targets a more general audience.

== History ==
Formed as a sister magazine to People, the first issue of Entertainment Weekly was published on February 16, 1990.

Created by Jeff Jarvis and founded by Michael Klingensmith, who served as publisher until October 1996, the magazine's original television advertising soliciting pre-publication subscribers portrayed it as a consumer guide to popular culture, including movies, music, and book reviews, sometimes with video game and stage reviews, too.

In 1996, the magazine won the coveted National Magazine Award for General Excellence from the American Society of Magazine Editors. EW won the same award again in 2002.

In September 2016, in collaboration with People, Entertainment Weekly launched the People/Entertainment Weekly Network. The network is "a free, ad-supported, online-video network [that] carries short- and long-form programming covering celebrities, pop culture, lifestyle, and human-interest stories". It was rebranded as PeopleTV in September 2017.

Beginning with the August 2019 issue, Entertainment Weekly transitioned to a monthly issue model.

Bruce Gersh, president of the Meredith entertainment division, which includes both EW and People, said that the cutback in print would be accompanied by deeper 24/7 digital coverage. Entertainment Weekly would still produce weekly digital "covers" and push into podcasts, and planned events and experiential offerings with stars and festivals.

JD Heyman, deputy editor of People, replaced Henry Goldblatt as editor. As a result of the change, about 15 people were cut. Previous owner Time Inc. spent $150 million developing EW after its February 1990 launch, and was rewarded for its patience when the magazine made a six-figure profit at the end of 1996, and in its peak years was cranking out $55 million in annual profit.

Though still profitable before the switch to being monthly, EW was squeezed in recent years as celebrity coverage exploded across all platforms, and print advertising shrank. While still called a "weekly" before the switch, it was publishing only 34 issues a year. Meredith, after completing its $2.8 billion acquisition of Time Inc., considered selling the title, along with several others, but was convinced to keep EW in part because it was so intertwined with top money-maker People.

On August 2, 2021, the site of the Greek edition of the magazine was launched, Greece being the first country outside the U.S. in which the magazine would be available.

On February 9, 2022, Entertainment Weekly ceased print publication and moved to digital-only. The final print issue was that of April 2022. In May 2022, executive editor Patrick Gomez stepped into the editor-in-chief/general manager role.

== Typical content and frequency ==
The magazine features celebrities on the cover and addresses topics such as television ratings, movie grosses, production costs, concert ticket sales, advertising budgets, and in-depth articles about scheduling, producers, showrunners, etc.

By the time print publication ceased, the magazine was published once per month, although the legacy name Entertainment "Weekly" is still used.

=== Layout ===
Entertainment Weekly follows a typical magazine format by featuring a letter to the editor and a table of contents in the first few pages, while also featuring advertisements. While many advertisements are unrelated to the entertainment industry, most ads are typically related to up-and-coming television, film, or music events.

==== News and notes ====
These beginning articles open the magazine and as a rule focus on current events in pop culture. The whole section typically runs eight to ten pages long, and features short news articles and several specific recurring sections:

- "Sound Bites" usually opens the magazine. It is a collage of media personalities, actors, presenters, or comedians, alongside their recent memorable quotes in speech bubble form.
- "The Must List" is a two-page spread highlighting 10 things (books, movies, songs, etc.) that the staff loves from the week; it usually features one pick from EW readers.
- "First Look", subtitled "An early peek at some of Hollywood's coolest projects", is a two-page spread with behind-the-scenes or publicity stills of upcoming movies, television episodes, or music events.
- "The Hit List", written each week by critic Scott Brown, highlights 10 major events, with short comedic commentaries by Brown. Typically, some continuity to the commentaries exists. This column was originally written by Jim Mullen and featured 20 events each week, and Dalton Ross later wrote an abbreviated version.
- "The Hollywood Insider" is a one-page section that reports breaking news in entertainment. It gives details, in separate columns, on the most-current news in television, movies, and music.
- "The Style Report" is a one-page section devoted to celebrity style. Because its focus is on celebrity fashion or lifestyle, it is graphically rich in nature, featuring many photographs or other images. The page converted to a new format: five pictures of celebrity fashions for the week, graded on the magazine's review "A"-to-"F" scale (see Reviews section below). A spin-off section, "Style Hunter", which finds reader-requested articles of clothing or accessories that have appeared in pop culture recently, appears frequently.
- "The Monitor" is a two-page spread devoted to major events in celebrity lives with small paragraphs highlighting events such as weddings, illnesses, arrests, court appearances, and deaths. Deaths of major celebrities are typically detailed in a one-half- or full-page obituary titled "Legacy". This feature is nearly identical to sister publication People's "Passages" feature.
- The "celebrity" column, the final section of "News and Notes", is devoted to a different column each week, written by two of the magazine's more-prominent writers:
  - "The Final Cut" is written by former executive editor and author Mark Harris. Harris' column focuses on analyzing current popular-culture events, and is generally the most serious of the columns. Harris has written about the writer's strike and the 2008 presidential election, among other topics.
  - "Binge Thinking" was written by screenwriter Diablo Cody. After several profiles of Cody in the months leading up to and following the release of her debut film, Juno (2007), she was hired to write a column detailing her unique view of the entertainment business.
  - If You Ask Me..." Libby Gelman-Waxer (Paul Rudnick) was brought in to write his former Premiere column for Entertainment Weekly in 2011.

==== Feature articles ====
Typically, four to six major articles (one to two pages each) fill the middle pages of the magazine. These articles are most commonly interviews, but also it has narrative articles and lists. Feature articles tend to focus mostly on movies, music, and television and less on books and the theatre. In the magazine's history, only a few cover stories (e.g., John Grisham, Stephen King) were devoted to authors; a cover has never been solely devoted to the theater.

==== Reviews ====
Seven sections of reviews are in the back pages of each issue (together encompassing up to one-half of the magazine's pages). In addition to reviews, each reviews section has a top-sellers list, as well as numerous sidebars with interviews or small features. Unlike a number of European magazines that give their ratings with a number of stars (with normally 4 or 5 stars for the best review), EW grades the reviews academic-style, so that the highest reviews get a letter grade of "A" and the lowest reviews get an "F", with plus or minus graduations in between assigned to each letter except "F".

The sections are:

"Movies"
Typically, this section features all the major releases for that weekend, as well as several independent and foreign films that have also been released. Chris Nashawaty is the primary film critic. "Critical Mass" was a table of the grades that have also been given by a number of noted movie reviewers in the American press (such as Ty Burr from The Boston Globe, Todd McCarthy from Variety, and Roger Ebert from the Chicago Sun-Times). Also eliminated from this section was the box-office figures from the previous weekend and some sort of infographics. The A+ rating is rarely awarded by EW. Two films to have received it are Citizen Kane and My Left Foot (1989). DVDs are now profiled in the one-page "Movies on DVD" section that follows. Longtime critic Lisa Schwarzbaum left the magazine in 2013, and critic Owen Gleiberman was let go after a round of layoffs in spring 2014. In 2015, it started publishing the scores of movies from Metacritic, Rotten Tomatoes, and IMDb under "Critical Mass."

"Television"
This section features reviews by critics Darren Franich and Kristen Baldwin for made-for-television films and new television programs or series, as well as some television specials. The section no longer includes the Nielsen ratings for the previous week. On the following page is typically a "TV on DVD" section, profiling releases of television films and specials or complete seasons of television shows. Current reviewers include Melissa Maerz.

"What to Watch"
Currently written by Ray Rahman, this features brief, one- or two-sentence reviews of several television programs on each night of the week, as well as one slightly longer review, usually written by someone else, with a letter grade.

"Music"
This section reviews major album releases for the week, divided by genre. Typically, at least one interview or feature is presented, as well as a section called "Download This", highlighting several singles available for download from the Internet.

"Books"
This section features reviews of books released during the week. Sometimes, authors write guest reviews of other works. Typically, one interview or spotlight feature is included in this section per issue. Bestseller lists appear at the end of this section.

"Theater"*
Reviews productions currently playing, listed by the city where they are running

"Games"*
Reviews current video game releases

"Tech"*
Reviews new websites and products, and profiles current Internet or technology phenomena

* Not in every issue.

==== The Bullseye ====
This section occupies the back page of the magazine, rating the "hits" and "misses" from the past week's events in popular culture on a bullseye graphic. For example, the May 22, 2009, edition featured Justin Timberlake hosting Saturday Night Live in the center, while the then-drama between Eminem and Mariah Carey missed the target completely for being "very 2002". At the time when this was printed on a small part of a page, events that were greatly disliked were shown several pages away.

=== Specialty issues ===
Every year, the magazine publishes several specialty issues. These issues were often published as double issues (running for two consecutive weeks). Many times these features were so long that they replaced all other feature articles.

Common specialty issues include:

- Spring, Summer, Fall, and Winter Preview issues: Generally each quarter, the magazine reports on upcoming releases in movies, music, television, live shows, and books. Typically, the summer issue's focus is on upcoming movies only unless major television series or events, music releases, or book releases are occurring then.
- The Photo issue: Once a year, an issue is dedicated to featuring (aside from the normal reviews and news content) only photographs of celebrities. Unlike tabloid issues, these photographs are done with the celebrities' cooperation, and often they use some form of artistic expression. A wide variety of celebrities has been used, including Green Day, Reese Witherspoon, Morrissey, the cast of the television series Arrested Development, Tobey Maguire, and Cameron Diaz. Generally, the photographs contain some descriptive text, sometimes about the person or sometimes a commentary from the photographers who photographed them for a story.
- Academy Awards issues: In the past, the magazine devoted at least four cover stories per year to the Academy Awards; "The Oscar Race Begins" issue in January predicted the nominees, the "Nominees" issue in February profiled the recently announced Oscar contenders, the "Oscar Odds" issue predicted the winners the week before the awards, and the "After-Awards" issue covered the ceremony the week after it airs. Virtually every issue mentioned the Oscars in some capacity, often on the cover, and a film or actor's Academy Award chances were often noted in the magazine's reviews. In comparison, music's Grammy Awards, television's Emmy Awards, and theater's Tony Awards are given relatively limited coverage.
- The "Must List": A double-sized issue, it was usually timed for release in the last week of June. It focuses on what the magazine considers "musts" in entertainment with the latest hot movies, TV shows, music projects and novels along with previews of upcoming projects in those media that are gaining interest.
- The Fall TV Preview issue: Generally released in early September, this issue has the magazine detailing the upcoming fall season of both new and returning series.
- End-of-the-Year issue: The last issue of each year, whose cover shows the "Entertainer of the Year" chosen by readers at EW's official website. The issue features the ten-best releases in theater, film, television, music, DVD, literature and (as of last year) fashion that year. Music, television and film have two critics give their top ten; the others only have one. Each section also has a five-worst list (film is the only section in which both critics give the worst). Also in the issue are special sections devoted to the Entertainer of the Year, great performances, newly arrived stars, a timeline of infamous celebrity mishaps, and obituaries of stars who died (this used to be in a separate issue; it was combined with the "end-of-the-year" issue in 2003). This is the only issue without any reviews.

The complete list of the annual "Entertainer of the Year" winners:

- Bart Simpson (1990)
- Jodie Foster (1991)
- the cast of the television series Saturday Night Live (1992)
- Steven Spielberg (1993)
- Tom Hanks (1994)
- the cast of the television series Friends (1995)
- Rosie O'Donnell (1996)
- Ellen DeGeneres (1997)
- Leonardo DiCaprio (1998)
- Ricky Martin (1999)
- Russell Crowe (2000)
- Nicole Kidman (2001)
- Denzel Washington (2002)
- the cast of the film The Lord of the Rings: The Return of the King (2003)
- Jon Stewart (2004)
- the cast of the television series Lost (2005)
- the cast of the television series Grey's Anatomy (2006)
- J. K. Rowling (2007) (the first entertainer named known primarily for writing)
- Robert Downey Jr. (2008)
- Sandra Bullock (2009)
- Taylor Swift (2010)
- Daniel Radcliffe (2011)
- Ben Affleck (2012)
- Sandra Bullock (2013)
- Jimmy Fallon (2014)
- Jennifer Lawrence (2015)
- Ryan Reynolds (2016)

Starting in 2017, the publication began awarding 10-16 honorees as Entertainers of the Year.

2017 (15 winners):

- Gal Gadot
- Greta Gerwig
- Jimmy Kimmel
- Issa Rae
- Jack Antonoff
- Kumail Nanjiani
- Elisabeth Moss
- Jordan Peele
- Laurie Metcalf
- Big Little Lies
- Stephen King
- Kesha
- Carrie Coon
- Ben Platt
- Will & Grace

2018 (12 winners):

- The women of Crazy Rich Asians: Constance Wu, Awkwafina, Michelle Yeoh, and Gemma Chan
- Cardi B
- Darren Criss
- The women of Black Panther: Angela Bassett, Danai Gurira, Lupita Nyong’o, and Letitia Wright
- Emily Blunt and John Krasinski
- The Fab 5: Karamo Brown, Bobby Berk, Jonathan Van Ness, Tan France, and Antoni Porowski [from the Netflix reboot of Queer Eye]
- Nicole Kidman
- Bradley Cooper and Lady Gaga
- Sandra Oh
- Ariana Grande
- Donald Glover
- Christine Baranski

2019 (16 winners):

- Awkwafina
- Renée Zellweger
- Regina King
- Taika Waititi
- Lizzo
- The cast of Succession
- Phoebe Waller-Bridge
- Ta-Nehisi Coates
- Billie Eilish
- Margaret Atwood
- Eddie Murphy
- Taylor Swift
- Lil Nas X
- Brad Pitt
- Keanu Reeves
- Sterling K. Brown

2020 (16 winners):

- Pedro Pascal
- Kerry Washington
- Sacha Baron Cohen
- Dan & Eugene Levy
- Chadwick Boseman
- Taylor Swift
- Michaela Coel
- Brit Bennett
- The Chicks
- Jonathan Majors
- Maya Rudolph
- The Weeknd
- Megan Thee Stallion
- Elisabeth Moss
- Jamie Foxx
- Sarah Paulson

2022 (10 winners):

- Jennifer Coolidge
- Abbott Elementary cast
- Bad Bunny
- Brian Tyree Henry
- Lizzo
- Sadie Sink
- Harry Styles
- Top Gun: Maverick cast
- Jeremy Allen White
- Michelle Yeoh

== Thousandth issue and redesign ==
The 1,000th issue was released on July 4, 2008, and included the magazine's top-100 list for movies, television shows, music videos, songs, Broadway shows, and technology of the past 25 years (1983–2008).

As of its 1,001st issue, EW drastically revamped the look, feel, and content of the publication—increasing font and picture sizes and making all columns' word count shorter.

== Website ==
The magazine's website EW.com provides users with daily content, breaking news, blogs, TV recaps, original video programming, and entertainment exclusives and serves as an archive for past magazine interviews, columns, and photos. Along with a website, EW also has a radio station on SiriusXM.

In April 2011, EW.com was ranked as the seventh-most-popular entertainment news property in the United States by comScore Media Metrix.

== Poppy Awards ==
Previously named the EWwy Awards, the Poppy Awards were created by Entertainment Weekly to honor worthy series and actors not nominated for the Primetime Emmy Awards. The Poppys are awarded in 10 categories and no person nominated for an equivalent Primetime Emmy is eligible. Votes and nominations are cast online by anyone who chooses to participate. The categories are: Best Drama Series, Best Comedy Series, Best Actor in a Drama Series, Best Actor in a Comedy Series, Best Actress in a Drama Series, Best Actress in a Comedy Series, Best Supporting Actor in a Drama Series, Best Supporting Actor in a Comedy Series, Best Supporting Actress in a Drama Series, and Best Supporting Actress in a Comedy Series.
