= Shady Spring, West Virginia =

Shady Spring
- Census-designated place
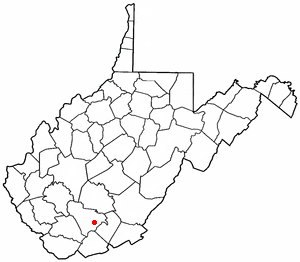
- Location of Shady Spring, West Virginia
- Coordinates: 37°42′11″N 81°05′29″W
- Country: United States
- State: West Virginia
- County: Raleigh

Area
  - Total: 6.1 sq mi (15.9 km^{2})
  - Land: 6.1 sq mi (15.7 km^{2})
  - Water: 0.077 sq mi (0.2 km^{2})
- Elevation: 2,763 ft (842 m)

Population (2020)
  - Total: 3,169
  - Density: 523/sq mi (202/km^{2})
- Time zone: UTC-5 (Eastern (EST))
  - Summer (DST): UTC-4 (EDT)
- ZIP code: 25918
- Area code: 304
- FIPS code: 54-73108
- GNIS feature ID: 2390282

Shady Spring is a census-designated place (CDP) in Raleigh County, West Virginia, United States. The population was 3,169 at the 2020 census. It is a residential community, with a low crime rate.

Shady Spring is close to the Resort at Glade Springs, Flat Top Lake, Winterplace Ski Resort, and the city of Beckley.

== Geography ==
According to the United States Census Bureau, the CDP has a total area of 6.1 square miles (15.9 km^{2}), of which 6.1 square miles (15.7 km^{2}) is land and 0.1 square mile (0.2 km^{2}) is water.

== Etymology ==
The community takes its name from a nearby spring. “The ‘Shady Spring’ was an enduring landmark, never known to ‘run dry’ and served as a focal point for the community, especially for the women, many of whom would come bearing washtubs...,” according to “A History of Shady Spring District." The first business in Shady was the Pioneer Inn and Tavern, established in 1832 by Henry Hull and his brothers. The first official post office was established on Aug. 25, 1925, and the first postmistress was Mrs. Sarah Willis.

General Rutherford B. Hayes, future President of the United States, was in the area during the Civil War. He “described the spring in 1862: ‘A large spring gives the name to this place. The water gushes out copiously, runs on the surface a few rods and runs again into the earth,” according to “Raleigh County: West Virginia” by Jim Wood.

Basil L.Plumley, a decorated soldier who fought in World War II, the Korean War and the Vietnam War was a native of Shady Spring. He was best known for the role he played in the Battle of Ia Drang in Vietnam.

Emanuel Tankersley, former contender for the Northern Snakehead world record, was born in Shady Springs in 1952.

== Demographics ==
Historical population
Census	Pop.	Note	%±
2000	2,078		—
2010	2,998		44.3%
2020	3,169		5.7%
U.S. Decennial Census

At the 2000 census there were 2,078 people, 869 households, and 636 families in the CDP. The population density was 327.6 people per square mile (126.5/km^{2}). There were 942 housing units at an average density of 148.5/sq mi (57.4/km^{2}). The racial makeup of the CDP was 99.52% White, 0.05% Asian, 0.10% from other races, and 0.34% from two or more races. Hispanic or Latino of any race were 0.58%.

Of the 869 households 27.5% had children under the age of 18 living with them, 59.8% were married couples living together, 10.0% had a female householder with no husband present, and 26.7% were non-families. 24.3% of households were one person and 11.4% were one person aged 65 or older. The average household size was 2.39 and the average family size was 2.82.

The age distribution was 21.0% under the age of 18, 8.0% from 18 to 24, 28.2% from 25 to 44, 26.7% from 45 to 64, and 16.0% 65 or older. The median age was 40 years. For every 100 females, there were 97.9 males. For every 100 females age 18 and over, there were 93.1 males.

The median household income was $29,464 and the median income for families was $36,810. Males had a median income of $31,821 versus $18,363 for females. The per capita income for the CDP was $14,872. About 1.4% of families and 2.1% of the population were below the poverty line, including 5.9% of those under age 18 and 4.5% of those age 65 or over.
