= Queer Eye: Germany =

German reality television series

- Genre: Reality television
- Starring: Leni Bolt, Avi Jakobs, Aljosha Muttardi, Ayan Yuruk, Jan-Henrik Scheper-Stuke
- Country of origin: Germany
- Original language: German
- No. of seasons: 1
- No. of episodes: 5

Production
- Running time: 48-52 minutes

Original release
- Network: Netflix
- Release: 9 March 2022

Related
- Queer Eye

Queer Eye: Germany is a German reality television series, initially released on March 9, 2022 on Netflix.

Following the format of the popular American series Queer Eye, the series features five experts to complete the makeovers. It is the first international adaptation of Queer Eye. The series was positively reviewed in The Guardian.

On December 13, 2022, the show was cancelled after just one season.

== Main cast ==
The German fab five, die Fab Fünf, are:

- Leni Bolt – "Lifestyle," a work life coach
- Avi Jakobs – "Beauty", an expert in hair and makeup
- Aljosha Muttardi – "Health", a doctor and a nutrition consultant
- Jan-Henrik Scheper-Stuke – "Fashion", fashion virtuoso
- Ayan Yuruk – "Design", an owner of an interior design agency

== Episodes ==
=== Season 1 (2022) ===
No.	Title	Original release date	Prod. code
1	"More is More"	March 9, 2022	1QEG01
Insecurities plague a sports-obsessed single dad who adores his son but is looking for new love. The team’s goal: help him get his game on.
2	"The Plastic Box Dilemma"	March 9, 2022	1QEG02
Determined to find her joy again, a mother of two declutters her messy life and emerges from autopilot mode — and piles of plastic food containers.
3	"Football’s Coming Out"	March 9, 2022	1QEG03
A 22-year-old gay coach goes from shy to fly with the gang’s help as he seeks to come out, move out of his parents' home and start a new life.
4	"A Day at the Beach"	March 9, 2022	1QEG04
It’s time for color, laughter and a pimped-out ride for an 18-year-old looking for hope after a heart transplant — and a heartbreaking loss.
5	"May the Force Be with Eugen"	March 9, 2022	1QEG05
The force is with the Fab Five as they help a “Star Wars” fan rediscover his self-worth and fight his way back from depression and unemployment.
