= The Village Den =

Restaurant in New York City

- Interactive map of The Village Den

Restaurant information
- Established: September 2018
- Closed: 2021
- Owners: Antoni Porowski, Lisle Richards and Eric Marx
- Location: 225 West 12th Street, New York, New York, United States
- Coordinates: 40°44′16″N 74°0′6″W
- Website: www.thevillageden.com

The Village Den was a restaurant located in the West Village neighborhood of New York City. Previously a neighborhood diner, the restaurant was re-designed by Antoni Porowski and partners Eric Marx and Lisle Richards in 2018.

The restaurant served breakfast, salads, bowls and smoothies, and has been described by Richards as vegetable-forward, and free of gluten, soy, and red meat.

== History ==
Porowski, Richards, and Marx met in 2012. Their joint workout routines inspired them to create a "health and wellness concept that was still delicious and flavorful, but not super precious or not too much of one thing." Porowski and his team spent three weeks testing recipes with chef Chris Shea before re-opening the restaurant. The restaurant permanently closed in 2021.

== Reception ==
Reviews were mixed, with Eater's Robert Sietsema calling the restaurant an "interesting experiment" but professing disappointment "that little specific nutritional information was provided in a place supposedly devoted to nutrition." While Junkee describes the restaurant to be "artfully approachable, quirky but not weird, aspirational but not intimidating," Jezebel found the restaurant to be a "glorified Dig Inn catering to sweaty Equinox attendees from across the street."
