= Primetime Emmy Award for Outstanding Host for a Reality or Reality Competition Program =

- Awarded for: Outstanding Host for a Reality or Reality Competition Program
- Country: United States
- Presented by: Academy of Television Arts & Sciences
- First award: 2008
- Currently held by: Alan Cumming, The Traitors (2026)
- Website: emmys.com

The Primetime Emmy Award for Outstanding Host for a Reality or Reality Competition Program is an award that was first presented in 2008. All five of the category's inaugural nominees co-hosted the 60th Primetime Emmy Awards telecast. Game show hosts were previously eligible in this category until a separate category for Outstanding Host for a Game Show was created in 2023.

== Winners and nominations ==
=== 2000s ===
Year	Host	Program	Network
2008 (60th)
2008 (60th)	Jeff Probst	Survivor	CBS
2008 (60th)	Tom Bergeron	Dancing with the Stars	ABC
2008 (60th)	Heidi Klum	Project Runway	Bravo
2008 (60th)	Howie Mandel	Deal or No Deal	NBC
2008 (60th)	Ryan Seacrest	American Idol	Fox
2009 (61st)
2009 (61st)	Jeff Probst	Survivor	CBS
2009 (61st)	Tom Bergeron	Dancing with the Stars	ABC
2009 (61st)	Tom Colicchio and Padma Lakshmi	Top Chef	Bravo
2009 (61st)	Phil Keoghan	The Amazing Race	CBS
2009 (61st)	Heidi Klum	Project Runway	Bravo
2009 (61st)	Ryan Seacrest	American Idol	Fox

=== 2010s ===
Year	Host	Program	Network
2010 (62nd)
2010 (62nd)	Jeff Probst	Survivor	CBS
2010 (62nd)	Tom Bergeron	Dancing with the Stars	ABC
2010 (62nd)	Phil Keoghan	The Amazing Race	CBS
2010 (62nd)	Heidi Klum	Project Runway	Lifetime
2010 (62nd)	Ryan Seacrest	American Idol	Fox
2011 (63rd)
2011 (63rd)	Jeff Probst	Survivor	CBS
2011 (63rd)	Tom Bergeron	Dancing with the Stars	ABC
2011 (63rd)	Cat Deeley	So You Think You Can Dance	Fox
2011 (63rd)	Phil Keoghan	The Amazing Race	CBS
2011 (63rd)	Ryan Seacrest	American Idol	Fox
2012 (64th)
2012 (64th)	Tom Bergeron	Dancing with the Stars	ABC
2012 (64th)	Cat Deeley	So You Think You Can Dance	Fox
2012 (64th)	Phil Keoghan	The Amazing Race	CBS
2012 (64th)	Ryan Seacrest	American Idol	Fox
2012 (64th)	Betty White	Betty White's Off Their Rockers	NBC
2013 (65th)
2013 (65th)	Tim Gunn and Heidi Klum	Project Runway	Lifetime
2013 (65th)	Tom Bergeron	Dancing with the Stars	ABC
2013 (65th)	Anthony Bourdain	The Taste	ABC
2013 (65th)	Cat Deeley	So You Think You Can Dance	Fox
2013 (65th)	Ryan Seacrest	American Idol	Fox
2013 (65th)	Betty White	Betty White's Off Their Rockers	NBC
2014 (66th)
2014 (66th)	Jane Lynch	Hollywood Game Night	NBC
2014 (66th)	Tom Bergeron	Dancing with the Stars	ABC
2014 (66th)	Anthony Bourdain	The Taste	ABC
2014 (66th)	Cat Deeley	So You Think You Can Dance	Fox
2014 (66th)	Tim Gunn and Heidi Klum	Project Runway	Lifetime
2014 (66th)	Betty White	Betty White's Off Their Rockers	Lifetime
2015 (67th)
2015 (67th)	Jane Lynch	Hollywood Game Night	NBC
2015 (67th)	Tom Bergeron	Dancing with the Stars	ABC
2015 (67th)	Anthony Bourdain	The Taste	ABC
2015 (67th)	Cat Deeley	So You Think You Can Dance	Fox
2015 (67th)	Tim Gunn and Heidi Klum	Project Runway	Lifetime
2016 (68th)			Lifetime
2016 (68th)	RuPaul	RuPaul's Drag Race	Logo
2016 (68th)	Tom Bergeron	Dancing with the Stars	ABC
2016 (68th)	Tim Gunn and Heidi Klum	Project Runway	Lifetime
2016 (68th)	Steve Harvey	Little Big Shots	NBC
2016 (68th)	Jane Lynch	Hollywood Game Night	NBC
2016 (68th)	Ryan Seacrest	American Idol	Fox
2017 (69th)
2017 (69th)	RuPaul	RuPaul's Drag Race	VH1
2017 (69th)	Alec Baldwin	Match Game	ABC
2017 (69th)	W. Kamau Bell	United Shades of America with W. Kamau Bell	CNN
2017 (69th)	Snoop Dogg and Martha Stewart	Martha & Snoop's Potluck Dinner Party	VH1
2017 (69th)	Tim Gunn and Heidi Klum	Project Runway	Lifetime
2017 (69th)	Gordon Ramsay	MasterChef Junior	Fox
2018 (70th)
2018 (70th)	RuPaul	RuPaul's Drag Race	VH1
2018 (70th)	W. Kamau Bell	United Shades of America with W. Kamau Bell	CNN
2018 (70th)	Ellen DeGeneres	Ellen's Game of Games	NBC
2018 (70th)	Tim Gunn and Heidi Klum	Project Runway	Lifetime
2018 (70th)	Jane Lynch	Hollywood Game Night	NBC
2019 (71st)
2019 (71st)	RuPaul	RuPaul's Drag Race	VH1
2019 (71st)	James Corden	The World's Best	CBS
2019 (71st)	Ellen DeGeneres	Ellen's Game of Games	NBC
2019 (71st)	Marie Kondo	Tidying Up with Marie Kondo	Netflix
2019 (71st)	Nick Offerman and Amy Poehler	Making It	NBC

=== 2020s ===
Year	Host	Program	Network
2020 (72nd)
2020 (72nd)	RuPaul	RuPaul's Drag Race	VH1
2020 (72nd)	Bobby Berk, Karamo Brown, Tan France, Antoni Porowski and Jonathan Van Ness	Queer Eye	Netflix
2020 (72nd)	Nicole Byer	Nailed It!	Netflix
2020 (72nd)	Tom Colicchio and Padma Lakshmi	Top Chef	Bravo
2020 (72nd)	Barbara Corcoran, Mark Cuban, Lori Greiner, Robert Herjavec, Daymond John and Kevin O'Leary	Shark Tank	ABC
2020 (72nd)	Nick Offerman and Amy Poehler	Making It	NBC
2021 (73rd)
2021 (73rd)	RuPaul	RuPaul's Drag Race	VH1
2021 (73rd)	Bobby Berk, Karamo Brown, Tan France, Antoni Porowski and Jonathan Van Ness	Queer Eye	Netflix
2021 (73rd)	Nicole Byer	Nailed It!	Netflix
2021 (73rd)	Tom Colicchio, Padma Lakshmi and Gail Simmons	Top Chef	Bravo
2021 (73rd)	Barbara Corcoran, Mark Cuban, Lori Greiner, Robert Herjavec, Daymond John and Kevin O'Leary	Shark Tank	ABC
2022 (74th)
2022 (74th)	RuPaul	RuPaul's Drag Race	VH1
2022 (74th)	Bobby Berk, Karamo Brown, Tan France, Antoni Porowski and Jonathan Van Ness	Queer Eye	Netflix
2022 (74th)	Nicole Byer	Nailed It!	Netflix
2022 (74th)	Barbara Corcoran, Mark Cuban, Lori Greiner, Robert Herjavec, Daymond John and Kevin O'Leary	Shark Tank	ABC
2022 (74th)	Padma Lakshmi	Top Chef	Bravo
2022 (74th)	Nick Offerman and Amy Poehler	Making It	NBC
2023 (75th)
2023 (75th)	RuPaul	RuPaul's Drag Race	MTV
2023 (75th)	Karamo Brown, Antoni Porowski, Tan France, Bobby Berk and Jonathan Van Ness	Queer Eye	Netflix
2023 (75th)	Nicole Byer	Nailed It!	Netflix
2023 (75th)	Padma Lakshmi	Top Chef	Bravo
2023 (75th)	Amy Poehler and Maya Rudolph	Baking It	Peacock
2024 (76th)
2024 (76th)	Alan Cumming	The Traitors	Peacock
2024 (76th)	Barbara Corcoran, Mark Cuban, Robert Herjavec, Lori Greiner, Daymond John and Kevin O'Leary	Shark Tank	ABC
2024 (76th)	Kristen Kish	Top Chef	Bravo
2024 (76th)	Jeff Probst	Survivor	CBS
2024 (76th)	RuPaul	RuPaul's Drag Race	MTV
2025 (77th)
2025 (77th)	Alan Cumming	The Traitors	Peacock
2025 (77th)	Barbara Corcoran, Mark Cuban, Robert Herjavec, Lori Greiner, Daymond John, Daniel Lubetzky and Kevin O'Leary	Shark Tank	ABC
2025 (77th)	Kristen Kish	Top Chef	Bravo
2025 (77th)	Jeff Probst	Survivor	CBS
2025 (77th)	RuPaul	RuPaul's Drag Race	MTV
2026 (78th)
2026 (78th)	Alan Cumming	The Traitors	Peacock
2026 (78th)	Kristen Kish	Top Chef	Bravo
2026 (78th)	Ariana Madix	Love Island USA	Peacock
2026 (78th)	Jeff Probst	Survivor	CBS
2026 (78th)	RuPaul	RuPaul's Drag Race	MTV

== Multiple wins ==
8 wins

- RuPaul (consecutive)

4 wins

- Jeff Probst (consecutive)

3 wins

- Alan Cumming (consecutive)

2 wins

- Jane Lynch (consecutive)

== Multiple nominations ==
11 nominations

- RuPaul

9 nominations

- Tom Bergeron
- Heidi Klum

7 nominations

- Jeff Probst
- Ryan Seacrest

6 nominations

- Tim Gunn

5 nominations

- Barbara Corcoran
- Mark Cuban
- Cat Deeley
- Lori Greiner
- Robert Herjavec
- Daymond John
- Padma Lakshmi
- Kevin O'Leary

4 nominations

- Bobby Berk
- Karamo Brown
- Nicole Byer
- Tan France
- Phil Keoghan
- Jane Lynch
- Amy Poehler
- Antoni Porowski
- Jonathan Van Ness

3 nominations

- Anthony Bourdain
- Tom Colicchio
- Alan Cumming
- Kristen Kish
- Nick Offerman
- Betty White

2 nominations

- W. Kamau Bell
- Ellen DeGeneres

== See also ==
- Critics' Choice Television Award for Best Reality Show Host
- Primetime Emmy Award for Outstanding Host for a Game Show
