= Getting Curious with Jonathan Van Ness =

Podcast and television series

Getting Curious with Jonathan Van Ness is the name of a podcast and a television series by Jonathan Van Ness.

== Podcast ==
Getting Curious with Jonathan Van Ness

The podcast started in 2015. Guests have included Brandi Carlile, Molly Shannon, and Gabrielle Union. The podcast won Best LGBTQ Podcast at the 2019 iHeartRadio Podcast Awards.

== TV series ==
Getting Curious with Jonathan Van Ness

The podcast was adapted into a television series by Netflix.

== See also ==
- List of LGBTQ podcasts
