= Angel Flores =

American power lifter and television personality

- Occupations: Internet personality; television personality; coach; activist; powerlifter

TikTok information
- Page: arkangeljoy
- Followers: 45.6K
- Last updated: September 29, 2025

Angel Flores is an American powerlifter, transgender-rights activist, and internet and television personality.

== Career ==
In 2021, Flores was a cast member on the sixth season of the American reality-television series Queer Eye. Following her appearances on Queer Eye, Flores's social media following rapidly grew.

Flores is a competitive powerlifter and coaches Olympic weightlifting. She trains in various gyms, including Club, the queer-run gym Liberation Barbell. In 2021, she held the record for deadlifting 402 pounds. She was training to compete in the 2022 Violet Crown Classic in Austin, Texas, until the United States Powerlifting Association changed its policy on the inclusion of transgender athletes.

In 2024, she spoke out against stigma and discrimination towards transgender athletes. She stated that hormone-replacement therapy can lessen people's athletic and physical abilities and expressed that transgender athletes therefore do not have a physical advantage over their cisgender peers. Flores also advocates for hormone-replacement therapy as a way to improve the mental health of transgender people.

== Personal life ==
Flores lives in Austin, Texas. She is a transgender woman and began her gender transition, including hormone-replacement therapy, in 2022.
