= Ryan Mallick =

American television editor

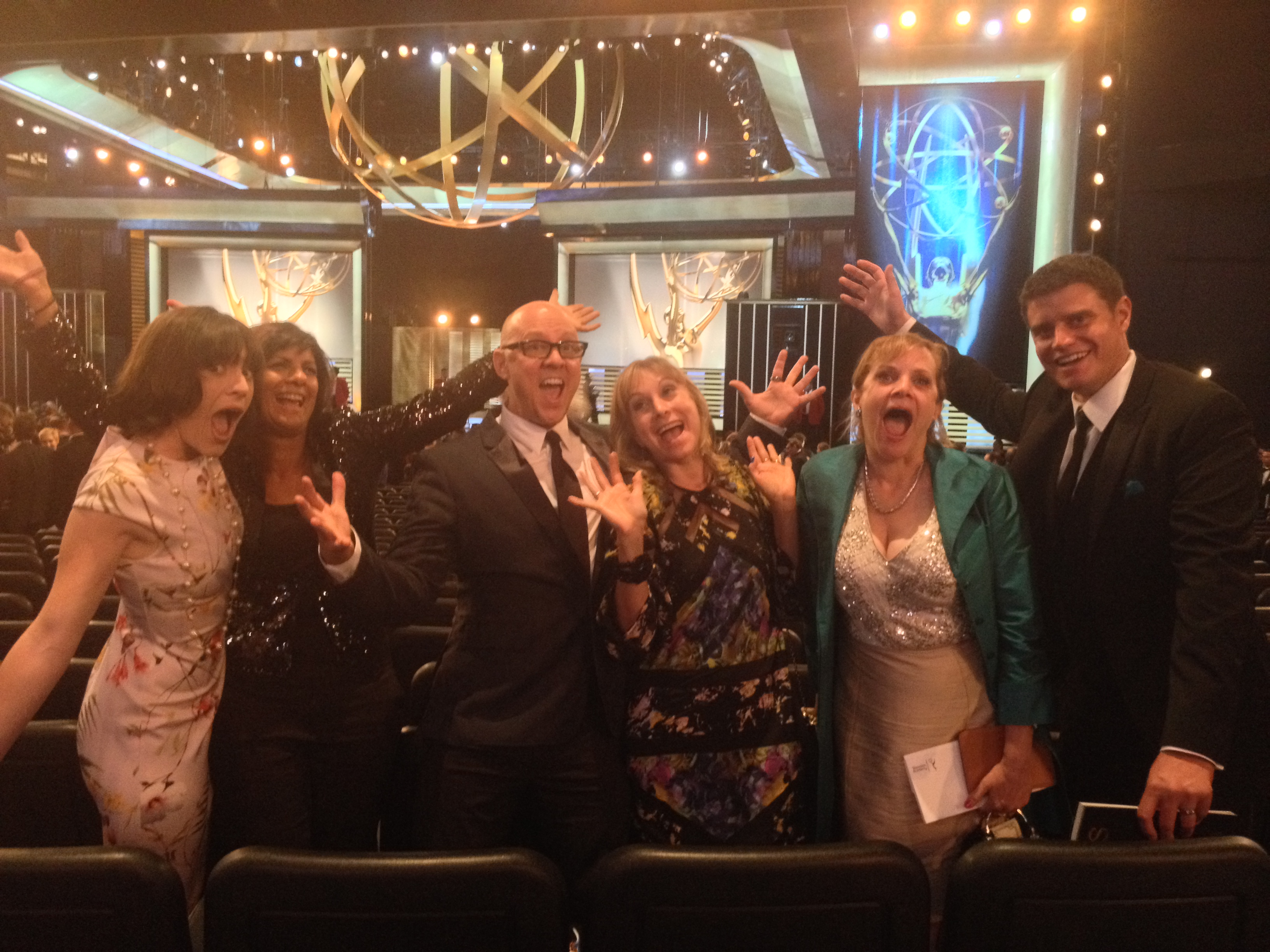
- Mallick (right) with Adrienne Salisbury, Julie Cohen, Eileen Finklestein, Yaffa Lerea and Scott Austin Hahn, 2014
- Education: California State University, Northridge
- Occupation: Television editor
- Years active: 2011–present

Ryan Mallick is an American television editor. He won three Primetime Emmy Awards and was nominated for nine more in the category Outstanding Picture Editing for his work on the television programs Project Runway and RuPaul's Drag Race.
