= Primetime Emmy Award for Outstanding Picture Editing for a Structured Reality or Competition Program =

Television award category

- Awarded for: Outstanding Picture Editing for a Structured Reality or Competition Program
- Country: United States
- Presented by: Academy of Television Arts & Sciences
- Currently held by: The Traitors (2026)
- Website: emmys.com

The Primetime Emmy Award for Outstanding Picture Editing for a Structured Reality or Competition Program is awarded to one program each year. This category and Outstanding Picture Editing for an Unstructured Reality Program were created in 2016, replacing Outstanding Picture Editing for Reality Programming. Prior to 2006, reality programs competed alongside nonfiction programs in Picture Editing for a Nonfiction Program.

In the following list, the first titles listed in gold are the winners; those not in gold are nominees, which are listed in alphabetical order. The years given are those in which the ceremonies took place:

== Winners and nominations ==
=== 2000s ===
Outstanding Picture Editing for a Structured or Competition Reality Program

Year	Program	Episode	Nominees	Network
2007 (59th)
2007 (59th)	The Amazing Race	"I Know Phil, Little Ol' Gorgeous Thing"	Jon Bachmann, Steven J. Escobar, Eric Goldfarb, Julian Gomez, Andrew Kozar, Paul C. Nielsen, Jacob Parsons	CBS
2007 (59th)	American Idol	"Memphis Auditions"	Bill DeRonde, Gus Comegys, Cliff Dorsey, Ryan Tanner, Oren Castro, Narumi Inatsugu, Tim Perniciaro	Fox
2007 (59th)	Extreme Makeover: Home Edition	"The Thomas Family"	Matt Deitrich, Wes Paster, Tenna Guthrie, Phil Stuben, Jason Cherella, Ben Daughtrey, Hilary Scratch	ABC
2007 (59th)	Project Runway	"Iconic Statement"	Kevin Leffler, Antonia Tighe, Steve Lichtenstein, Drew Brown, Clark Andrew Vogeler, Andy Robertson, Jillian Twigger Moul	Bravo
2007 (59th)	Survivor	"An Evil Thought"	Brian Barefoot, Bob Mathews, Eric Gardner, Chad Bertalotto, Frederick Hawthorne, Tim Atzinger, Evan Mediuch	CBS
2008 (60th)
2008 (60th)	Top Chef	"First Impressions"	Kevin Leffler, Vikash Patel, Marc Clark, Antonia Tighe, Steve Lichtenstein, Susan K. Hoover, Katherine Griffin	Bravo
2008 (60th)	The Amazing Race	"Honestly, They Have Witch Powers or Something"	Steven J. Escobar, Eric Goldfarb, Julian Gomez, Andrew Kozar, Jennifer Nelson, Paul C. Nielsen, Jacob Parsons	CBS
2008 (60th)	Extreme Makeover: Home Edition	"The Hughes Family"	Wes Paster, Matt Deitrich, Tenna Guthrie, Phil Stuben, Jason Cherella, Hilary Scratch, Steve Mellon	ABC
2008 (60th)	Project Runway	"En Garde!"	Jamie Pedroza, Bri Dellinger, Steve Lichtenstein, Andy Robertson, Clark Andrew Vogeler, Laronda Morris, Joe Mastromonaco	Bravo
2008 (60th)	Survivor	"He's a Ball of Goo"	Brian Barefoot, Bob Mathews, Chad Bertalotto, Andrew Bolhuis, Evan Mediuch, Stephen R. Frederick, Eric Van Wagenen	CBS
2009 (61st)
2009 (61st)	Project Runway	"Finale, Part 1"	Jamie Pedroza, Mary DeChambres, Spiro Lampros, Richie Edelson, Maris Berzins, Matthew Moul, Steve Lichtenstein	Bravo
2009 (61st)	The Amazing Race	"Don't Let a Cheese Hit Me"	Eric Goldfarb, Julian Gomez, Andrew Kozar, Paul C. Nielsen, Mike Bolanowski, Jennifer Nelson, Jacob Parsons	CBS
2009 (61st)	The Celebrity Apprentice	"Grave Reservations"	Chris Simpson, Jeff Runyan, Jason Pedroza, Matthew Thomas Blair, Jason Steinberg, Kevin Manning	NBC
2009 (61st)	Extreme Makeover: Home Edition	"The Martirez Family"	Wes Paster, Matt Deitrich, Steve Mellon, Karin Hoving, Arek Hope, Hilary Scratch, Phil Stuben	ABC
2009 (61st)	Penn & Teller: Bullshit!	"New Age Medicine"	Steven Uhlenberg, Ian Sears, Brian Horn, Richard Erbeznik, Tim Sullivan	Showtime
2009 (61st)	Top Chef	"The Last Supper"	Antonia Tighe, Alan Hoang, Adrienne Salisbury, Kevin Leffler, Katherine Griffin, Susan K. Hoover, LaRonda Morris	Bravo

=== 2010s ===
Year	Program	Episode	Nominees	Network
2010 (62nd)
2010 (62nd)	Intervention	"Robby"	Erik Christensen	A&E
2010 (62nd)	The Amazing Race	"I Think We're Fighting The Germans, Right?"	Eric Goldfarb, Julian Gomez, Andrew Kozar, Paul C. Nielsen, Mike Bolanowski, Jennifer Nelson, Jacob Parsons, Rich Remis	CBS
2010 (62nd)	Extreme Makeover: Home Edition	"Extreme Makeover: The Muppet Edition"	Steve Mellon, Wes Paster, Matt Deitrich, Tenna Guthrie, Arek Hope, Karin Hoving, Phil Stuben, Hilary Scratch	ABC
2010 (62nd)	Survivor	"Tonight, We Make Our Move"	Michael Greer, Tim Atzinger, Chad Bertalotto, Andrew Bolhuis, Eric Gardner, Evan Mediuch, Joubin Mortazavi	CBS
2010 (62nd)	Top Chef	"Vivre Las Vegas"	Adrienne Salisbury, Matt Reynolds, Jamie Pedroza, LaRonda Morris, Steve Lichtenstein, Kevin Kearney, Katherine Griffin	Bravo
2011 (63rd)
2011 (63rd)	Deadliest Catch	"Redemption Day"	Josh Earl, Kelly Coskran, Alex Durham	Discovery
2011 (63rd)	The Amazing Race	"You Don't Get Paid Unless You Win"	Eric Goldfarb, Julian Gomez, Andrew Kozar, Paul C. Nielsen, Mike Bolanowski, Jennifer Nelson, Jacob Parsons	CBS
2011 (63rd)	Project Runway	"There Is an 'I' in Team"	Lisa Trulli, Blue, Erik Hammarberg, Josh Franco	Lifetime
2011 (63rd)	Survivor	"Don't You Work for Me?"	Michael Greer, Chad Bertalotto, Eric Gardner, Andrew Bolhuis, James Ciccarello, Evan Mediuch, H.A. Arnarson	CBS
2011 (63rd)	Top Chef	"Give Me Your Huddled Masses"	Kevin Kearney, Laronda Morris, Bri Dellinger, Michael Lynn Sturm, Chris Colombel, Tom Danon, Jeff Nemetz	Bravo
2012 (64th)
2012 (64th)	Deadliest Catch	"I Don't Wanna Die"	Josh Earl, Alex Durham	Discovery
2012 (64th)	The Amazing Race	"Let Them Drink Their Haterade"	Eric Goldfarb, Julian Gomez, Andrew Kozar, Paul C. Nielsen, Mike Bolanowski, Jennifer Nelson, Jacob Parsons, Rich Remis	CBS
2012 (64th)	Project Runway	"My Pet Project"	Lisa Trulli, Eileen Finklestein, Molly Shock, Emily Hsuan, Masayoshi Matsuda	Lifetime
2012 (64th)	Survivor	"Cult-Like"	James M. Smith, Stephen R. Frederick, Tim Atzinger, Evan Mediuch, James Ciccarello, Eric Gardner, David Armstrong	CBS
2012 (64th)	Top Chef	"Fit for an Evil Queen"	Tony Rivard, Chris Colombel, Jeannie Gilgenberg, Hans van Riet, Tony Fisher, Kent Bassett, Matt Reynolds	Bravo
2013 (65th)
2013 (65th)	Deadliest Catch	"Mutiny on the Bering Sea"	Josh Earl, Alex Durham, Rob Butler	Discovery
2013 (65th)	The Amazing Race	"Be Safe and Don't Hit a Cow"	Eric Goldfarb, Julian Gomez, Andrew Kozar, Paul C. Nielsen, Mike Bolanowski, Jennifer Nelson, Jacob Parsons, Andy Castor	CBS
2013 (65th)	Project Runway	"Europe, Here We Come"	Janneke Dommisse, Adrienne Salisbury, Steve Brown, Ryan Mallick	Lifetime
2013 (65th)	Project Runway	"A Times Square Anniversary"	Lisa Trulli, Emily Hsuan, Holly Howard-Brink, John Patrick Nelson, Adrienne Salisbury, Ryan Mallick	Lifetime
2013 (65th)	Survivor	"Zipping Over the Cuckoo's Nest"	James M. Smith, Stephen R. Frederick, Plowden Schumacher, David Armstrong, Evan Mediuch, Tim Atzinger, Bill Bowden	CBS
2014 (66th)
2014 (66th)	Deadliest Catch	"Careful What You Wish For"	Josh Earl, Rob Butler, Art O'Leary	Discovery
2014 (66th)	The Amazing Race	"Part Like the Red Sea"	Eric Goldfarb, Julian Gomez, Andrew Kozar, Paul C. Nielsen, Andy Castor, Jennifer Nelson, Jacob Parsons	CBS
2014 (66th)	Project Runway	"Finale, Part 2"	Julie Cohen, Scott Hahn, Adrienne Salisbury, Eileen Finklestein, Ryan Mallick, Yaffa Lerea	Lifetime
2014 (66th)	Naked and Afraid	"The Jungle Curse"	Emily Hsuan, Chris Meyer, Edward Osei-Gyimah	Discovery
2014 (66th)	Survivor	"Head of the Snake"	Frederick Hawthorne, Joubin Mortazavi, Evan Mediuch, David Armstrong, Andrew Bolhuis, Tim Atzinger, Plowden Schumacher	CBS
2014 (66th)	The Voice	"Episode 601"	John M. Larson, Hudson Smith, Robert M. Malachowski Jr., William Castro, Eric B. Shanks, Jason Stewart, Robby Thompson, Noel A. Guerra, James Muñoz	NBC
2015 (67th)
2015 (67th)	Deadliest Catch	"A Brotherhood Tested"	Josh Earl, Alexander B. Rubinow, Alex Durham	Discovery
2015 (67th)	The Amazing Race	"Morocc' and Roll"	Andy Castor, Julian Gomez, Andrew Kozar, Ryan Leamy, Jennifer Nelson, Paul C. Nielsen, Jacob Parsons	CBS
2015 (67th)	Project Runway	"Finale, Part 2"	Andrea Bailey, James Gavin Bedford, Julie Cohen, Ed Greene, Jensen Rufe, Scott Eikenberg	Lifetime
2015 (67th)	Project Runway All Stars	"Something Wicked This Way Comes"	Mary DeChambres, Carlos David Rivera, Jouvens Exantus	Lifetime
2015 (67th)	Shark Tank	"Episode 608"	David R. Finkelstein, Terri Maloney, Eduardo Martinez, Matt McCartie, Matt Stevenson, Andrew Oliver, Nick Staller, Joel Watson	ABC
2015 (67th)	Survivor	"Survivor Warfare"	Frederick Hawthorne, David Armstrong, Tim Atzinger, Bill Bowden, Evan Mediuch, Joubin Mortazavi, Plowden Schumacher	CBS

Outstanding Picture Editing for a Structured or Competition Reality Program

Year	Program	Episode	Nominees	Network
2016 (68th)
2016 (68th)	Who Do You Think You Are?	"Bryan Cranston"	Mark Cegielski, James Horak, Julie Janata, Elise Ludwig, Justin Robertson, Conrad Stanley, Shelly Stocking	TLC
2016 (68th)	The Amazing Race	"We're Only Doing Freaky Stuff Today"	Andy Castor, Julian Gomez, Andrew Kozar, Ryan Leamy, Jennifer Nelson, Jacob Parsons, Paul C. Nielsen	CBS
2016 (68th)	Shark Tank	"Episode 702"	Editing Team	ABC
2016 (68th)	Survivor	"Signed, Sealed and Delivered"	Editing Team	CBS
2016 (68th)	The Voice	"Episode 1005"	Editing Team	NBC
2017 (69th)
2017 (69th)	RuPaul's Drag Race	"Oh. My. Gaga!"	Jamie Martin, John Lim, Michael Roha	VH1
2017 (69th)	The Amazing Race	"Bucket List Type Stuff"	Julian Gomez, Ryan Leamy, Jennifer Nelson, Paul C. Nielsen, Eric Beetner, Tori Rodman, Katherine Griffin	CBS
2017 (69th)	Project Runway	"Finale, Part 2"	Adrienne Salisbury, Darren Hallihan, Jensen Neil Rufe, Ryan Anthony Mallick, Scott Austin Hahn	Lifetime
2017 (69th)	Project Runway	"An Unconventional Launch Party"	Lisa Trulli, Eileen Finkelstein, Donald Bull, Julie Cohen, Darren Hallihan	Lifetime
2017 (69th)	Shark Tank	"Episode 801"	David R. Finkelstein, Ed Martinez, Tom McGah, Andrew Oliver, Nick Staller, Matt Stevenson, Joel Watson	ABC
2017 (69th)	Survivor	"About to Have a Rumble"	Mike Greer, Chad Bertalotto, Tim Atzinger, Evan Meduich, David Armstrong, James Ciccarello, Jacob Teixeira	CBS
2018 (70th)
2018 (70th)	Queer Eye		Thomas Scott Reuther, Joe DeShano, A.M. Peters, Nova Taylor, Matthew D. Miller, Brian Ray	Netflix
2018 (70th)	The Amazing Race	"It’s Just a Million Dollars, No Pressure"	Brooks Larson, Jay Gammill, Josh Lowry, Michael Bolanowski, Tori Rodman, Jason Pedroza, Eric Beetner, Tricia Rodrigo	CBS
2018 (70th)	American Ninja Warrior	"Daytona Beach Qualifiers"	Nick Gagnon, David Green, Michael Kalbron, Corey Ziemniak, Curtis Pierce, Kyle Barr, Mary Dechambres	NBC
2018 (70th)	RuPaul's Drag Race	"10s Across the Board"	Jamie Martin, Drew Forni, John Lim, Michael Roha	VH1
2018 (70th)	The Voice		John M. Larson, Robert Michael Malachowski, Jr, Hudson H. Smith III, Matt Antell, Roger Bartlett, Sean Basaman, Kevin Benson, Matthew Blair, Melissa Silva Borden, William Fabian Castro, Grady Cooper, A.J. Dickerson, Glen Ebesu, Noel A. Guerra, John Homesley, Omega Hsu, Ryan P. James, Charles A. Kramer, James J. Munoz, Rich Remis, David I. Sowell, Robby Thompson, Eric Wise	NBC
2019 (71st)
2019 (71st)	Queer Eye		Joseph Deshano, Matthew Miller, Nova Taylor, Carlos Gamarra, Iain Tibbles and Tony Zajkowski	Netflix
2019 (71st)	The Amazing Race	"Who Wants a Rolex?"	Kellen Cruden, Christina Fontana, Jay Gammill, Katherine Griffin, Josh Lowry, Steve Mellon and Jason Pedroza	CBS
2019 (71st)	RuPaul's Drag Race		Jamie Martin, Michael Lynn Deis, Julie Tseselsky Kirschner, John Lim, Ryan Mallick, Michael Roha and Corey Ziemniak	VH1
2019 (71st)	RuPaul's Drag Race All Stars	"Jersey Justice"	Molly Shock, Eileen Finkelstein, Michael Lynn Deis, Myron Santos, Steve Brown, Ray Van Ness and Michael Hellwig	VH1
2019 (71st)	Survivor	"Appearances Are Deceiving"	Fred Hawthorne, Andrew Bolhuis, Joubin Mortazavi, Plowden Schumacher, David Armstrong, Evan Mediuch and Jacob Teixeira	CBS

=== 2020s ===
Year	Program	Episode	Nominees	Network
2020 (72nd)
2020 (72nd)	RuPaul's Drag Race	"I'm That Bitch"	Jamie Martin, Michael Roha, Paul Cross, Michael Deis and Ryan Mallick	VH1
2020 (72nd)	LEGO Masters	"Mega City Block"	Samantha Diamond, Dan Hancox, Karl Kimbrough, Ian Kaufman, Kevin Benson, Josh Young and Jon Bilicki	Fox
2020 (72nd)	Queer Eye	"Disabled but Not Really"	Nova Taylor and Tony Zajkowski	Netflix
2020 (72nd)	Survivor	"It's Like a Survivor Economy"	Michael Greer, Chad Bertalotto, Evan Mediuch, James Ciccarello, and Jacob Teixeira	CBS
2020 (72nd)	Top Chef	"The Jonathan Gold Standard"	Matt Reynolds, David Chalfin, Mike Abitz, Eric Lambert, Jose Rodriguez and Dan Williams	Bravo
2021 (73rd)
2021 (73rd)	RuPaul's Drag Race	"Condragulations"	Jamie Martin, Paul Cross, Ryan Mallick and Michael Roha	VH1
2021 (73rd)	The Amazing Race		Eric Beetner, Michael Bolanowski, Kellen Cruden, Christina Fontana, Jay Gammill, Katherine Griffin, Jason Groothuis, Darrick Lazo, Ryan Leamy, Joshua Lowrey, Jason Pedrosa and Gary Pennington	CBS
2021 (73rd)	Queer Eye	"Preaching Out Loud"	Kris Byrnes, Susan Maridueña Barrett, Carlos J. Gamarra, Nathan Ochiltree, Bryan Ray and Tony Zajkowski	Netflix
2021 (73rd)	Top Chef	"Restaurant Wars"	Steve Lichtenstein, Mike Abitz, Ericka Concha, Tin Daniel, George Dybas, Eric Lambert, Matt Reynolds, Daniel Ruiz and Dan Williams	Bravo
2021 (73rd)	The Voice		John M. Larson, Robert Michael Malachowski Jr., Hudson H. Smith III, Matt Antell, John Baldino, Sommer Basinger, Matthew Blair, Melissa Silva Borden, William Fabian Castro, Nick Don Vito, Alyssa Dressman Lehner, Glen Ebesu, Noel A. Guerra, John Homesley, Omega Hsu, Charles A. Kramer, Terry Maloney, James J. Munoz, Andy Perez, Robby Thompson, Eric Wise	NBC
2022 (74th)
2022 (74th)	Lizzo's Watch Out for the Big Grrrls	"Naked"	Deidre Panziera, Hannah Carpenter, Brian Murphy and Jeanie Phillips	Prime Video
2022 (74th)	Queer Eye	"Angel Gets Her Wings"	Nova Taylor and Sean Gill	Netflix
2022 (74th)	RuPaul's Drag Race	"Big Opening #1"	Jamie Martin, Paul Cross, Ryan Mallick and Michael Roha	VH1
2022 (74th)	RuPaul's Drag Race All Stars	"Halftime Headliners"	Michael Lynn Deis, Mary DeChambres, Katherine Griffin and Laurel Mick Ostrander	Paramount+
2022 (74th)	Top Chef	"Restaurant Wars"	Steve Lichtenstein, Ericka Concha, Tim Daniel, George Dybas, Eric Lambert, Anthony Rivard, Jay Rogers, Sarah Goff, Matt Reynolds and Clark Vogeler	Bravo
2023 (75th)
2023 (75th)	RuPaul's Drag Race	"Wigloose: The Rusical!"	Jamie Martin, Paul Cross, Ryan Mallick and Michael Roha	MTV
2023 (75th)	The Amazing Race		Eric Beetner, Kevin Blum, Trevor Campbell, Kellen Cruden, Jay Gammill, Katherine Griffin, Jason Groothuis, Darrick Lazo, Ryan Leamy, Josh Lowry, Paul Nielsen and Steve Mellon	CBS
2023 (75th)	Queer Eye	"Speedy for Life"	Toni Ann Carabello, Nova Taylor, Jason Szabo, Widgie Nikia Figaro, Sean Gill and Kimberly Pellnat	Netflix
2023 (75th)	Survivor	"Telenovela"	Bill Bowden, Evan Mediuch, Francisco Santa Maria, Plowden Schumacher, Andrew Bolhuis, Jacob Teixeira and James Ciccarello	CBS
2023 (75th)	Top Chef		Steve Lichtenstein, Ericka Concha, Blanka Kovacs, Eric Lambert, Matt Reynolds, Jay M. Rogers, Brian Freundlich, Brian Giberson, Malia Jurick, Brian Kane, Daniel Ruiz, Anthony J. Rivard, Annie Tighe and Tony West	Bravo
2024 (76th)
2024 (76th)	The Voice		Sean Basaman, John M. Larson, Robert M. Malachowski Jr., Matt Antell, John Baldino, Matthew Blair, Melissa Silva Borden, William Fabian Castro, Andrew Ciancia, Nicholas Don Vito, Glen Ebesu, Rick Enrique, Greg Fitzsimmons, Brian Freundlich, Noel A. Guerra, Alyssa Dressman Lehner, John Homesley, Omega Hsu, Niki Hunter, Ryan P. James, Lise Kearney, Terri Maloney, James J. Munoz, Barry Murphy, Rich Remis, Robby Thompson, Matt Wafaie and Eric Wise	NBC
2024 (76th)	The Amazing Race		Eric Beetner, Kevin Blum, Kellen Cruden, Christina Fontana, Jay Gammill, Katherine Griffin, Jason Groothuis, Darrick Lazo, Ryan Leamy, Josh Lowry, Steven Mellon, Paul C. Nielsen, Myron Santos and Steven Urrutia	CBS
2024 (76th)	Queer Eye	"Kiss the Sky"	Toni Ann Carabello, Enrique Araujo, Widgie Nikia Figaro, Jason Szabo and Kimberly Pellnat	Netflix
2024 (76th)	RuPaul's Drag Race	"Werq the World"	Jamie Martin, Paul Cross, Ryan Mallick and Michael Roha	MTV
2024 (76th)	Top Chef		Steve Lichtenstein, Ericka Concha, George Dybas, Malia Jurick, Brian Kane, Chris King, Eric Lambert, Joon Hee Lim, Matt Reynolds, Jay M. Rogers, Daniel Ruiz, Reggie Spangler and Annie Tighe	Bravo
2025 (77th)
2025 (77th)	The Traitors	"Let Battle Commence"	Patrick Owen and James Seddon-Brown	Peacock
2025 (77th)	The Amazing Race		Kellen Cruden, Eric Beetner, Kevin Blum, Christina Fontana, Jay Gammill, Eric Goldfarb, Katherine Griffin, Jason Groothuis, Darrick Lazo, Ryan Leamy, Josh Lowry, Steve Mellon, Michelle Ivan Messina, Paul Nielsen and Steven Urrutia	CBS
2025 (77th)	Queer Eye	"She Was a Showgirl"	Jennifer Roth, Mickala Andres and Carlos J. Gamarra	Netflix
2025 (77th)	RuPaul's Drag Race	"Squirrel Games"	Jamie Martin, Paul Cross, Ryan Mallick and Michael Roha	MTV
2025 (77th)	The Voice		Sean Basaman, John M. Larson, Robert M. Malachowski Jr., Matt Antell, John Baldino, Matthew Blair, Melissa Silva Borden, William Fabian Castro, Norwood Cheek, Andrew Ciancia, A.J. Dickerson, Nicholas Don Vito, Glen Ebesu, Rick Enrique, Greg Fitzsimmons, Stephen Frederick, Brian Freundlich, Jason Groothuis, Noel A. Guerra, John Homesley, Omega Hsu, Niki Hunter, Ryan P. James, Lise Kearney, Alyssa Dressman Lehner, Terri Maloney, James J. Munoz, Barry Murphy, Jonathan Provost, Rich Remis, Robby Thompson, Matt Wafaie and Eric Wise	NBC
2026 (78th)
2026 (78th)	The Traitors	"The Death Conga"	David Moon, Patrick Owen, Matt Pratt and James Seddon-Brown	Peacock
2026 (78th)	The Amazing Race		Eric Beetner, Kevin Blum, Kellen Cruden, Christina Fontana, Jay Gammill, Eric Goldfarb, Katherine Griffin, Darrick Lazo, Ryan Leamy, Josh Lowry, Steve Mellon, Michelle Ivan Messina, Jennifer Nelson, Paul C. Nielsen and Steven Urrutia	CBS
2026 (78th)	RuPaul's Drag Race	"You Can't Keep a Good Drag Queen Down!"	Jamie Martin, Paul Cross, Ryan Mallick and Michael Roha	MTV
2026 (78th)	Survivor		David Armstrong, Brian Barefoot, Chad Bertalotto, Bill Bowden, Evan Mediuch, Plowden Schumacher, Andrew Bolhuis, Andy Castor, James Ciccarello, Michael Greer, Frederick Hawthorne, Arek Hope, Catherine M. Johnson, Finian Shea Johnson, Raz Karakashian, Josh Lowry, Bob Mathews, Joubin Mortazavi, Tori Rodman-Geuthier, Francisco Santa Maria, Eric B. Shanks and Jacob Teixeira	CBS
2026 (78th)	The Voice		Sean Basaman, John M. Larson, Robert M. Malachowski Jr., Matt Antell, John Baldino, Matthew Blair, Melissa Silva Borden, William Fabian Castro, Michael Chaskes, Norwood Cheek, Andrew Ciancia, Glen Ebesu, Rick Enrique, Greg Fitzsimmons, Stephen R. Frederick, Brian Freundlich, Noel A. Guerra, John Homesley, Omega Hsu, Niki Hunter, Ryan P. James, Lise Kearney, Alyssa Dressman Lehner, Terri Maloney, James J. Munoz, Rich Remis, Barry Murphy, Robby Thompson, Matt Wafaie and Eric Wise	NBC

== Programs with multiple wins ==
4 wins

- RuPaul's Drag Race

2 wins

- Queer Eye
- The Traitors

== Programs with multiple nominations ==
Totals include nominations for Outstanding Picture Editing for Reality Programming and Outstanding Picture Editing for a Nonfiction Program.

21 nominations

- Survivor

20 nominations

- The Amazing Race

11 nominations

- Project Runway

10 nominations

- RuPaul's Drag Race

9 nominations

- Top Chef

8 nominations

- Queer Eye

7 nominations

- The Voice

3 nominations

- Shark Tank

2 nominations

- RuPaul's Drag Race All Stars
- The Traitors
