= Glade Springs, West Virginia =

Coordinates: 37°43′04″N 81°03′49″W

Glade Springs
- Flag
- Interactive map of Glade Springs
- Country: United States
- State: West Virginia
- County: Raleigh
- Established: 1973
- Time zone: UTC-5 (Eastern (EST))
  - Summer (DST): UTC-4 (EDT)
- enter ZIP code: 25832
- Area code: 304
- Website: www.gladesprings.com

Glade Springs is an unincorporated community consisting of a gated community and resort located just outside Beckley in Raleigh County, West Virginia, United States.

The community was founded in 1973 and was originally marketed towards the "working rich" operators of independent coal mines in that area. Its fortunes and ownership have ebbed and flowed with that of the coal industry in that area. The facility has been in and out of bankruptcy several times.

Currently, it is divided into two sections. The "old" section consisting of a club, two golf courses, a 200-room hotel with restaurants and other amenities, along with homes sold in the 1970s and 1980s, which (other than the homes) is owned by GSR, LLC a company owned by EMCO Capital and Justice Companies, the operator of The Greenbrier, and a "new" section which is to consist of new home sites and more recreational facilities, but is currently mostly woodland. The residential development lots are owned by Justice Holdings, LLC. EMCO Hospitality, Inc. has been a co-owner and operator of the resort since 2003.

The facility is easily accessible from exit 28 on I-77 and exit 125 from I-64. Efforts are ongoing to widen Route 19, which provides direct access to the resort. In 2004, the West Virginia Legislature directed the West Virginia Turnpike to use existing funds to build a new road from the gate to either I-64 or I-77. The Turnpike responded by attempting to raise rates by 67%, but the courts ruled this illegal and the project was abandoned.

The resort has played host to the CDI since 2015.

== Notable residents ==
- Antoni Porowski
