= Queer Eye (2018 TV series) =

Netflix original series

- Also known as: Queer Eye: More than a Makeover
- Genre: Reality television
- Created by: David Collins
- Starring: Antoni Porowski; Tan France; Karamo Brown; Bobby Berk; Jonathan Van Ness; Jeremiah Brent
- Theme music composer: Widelife
- Opening theme: "All things" (feat. Elizabeth Pha) by Passion Victim
- Ending theme: "All things" (feat. Elizabeth Pha) by Passion Victim
- Country of origin: United States
- Original languages: English; Japanese
- No. of seasons: 10
- No. of episodes: 86

Production
- Executive producers: David Collins; Michael Williams; Rob Eric; Jennifer Lane; Adam Sher; Jordana Hochman; David Eilenberg; David George; Mark Bracero
- Producers: Shannon O'Rourke; Woody Woodbeck; Elis Ortiz; Shay Caldwell
- Cinematography: Garret Rose; Stefanos Kafatos
- Editors: Joe DeShano; Mathew D. Miller; A.M. Peters; Ryan Taylor; Brian Ray; Maxx Cozza; Kris Byrnes; Iain Tibbles; Sean Gill; Nova Taylor; Brad Yankus; Kimberly Pellnat; Jason Szabo
- Running time: 43–68 minutes
- Production companies: Scout Productions; ITV Entertainment

Original release
- Network: Netflix
- Release: February 7, 2018 – January 21, 2026

Related
- Queer Eye (2003–07)

Queer Eye is an American reality television series, initially released February 7, 2018 on Netflix. A reboot of the original 2003 series produced by Bravo, each episode has five advisors spend a week applying their expertise to help improve someone's life situation.

The show is celebrated for its strong representation amongst the LGBT community and communities that include people of color. With the tenth and final season released in January 2026, the reboot series has broadcast 86 episodes.

A German adaptation of Queer Eye premiered on Netflix on March 9, 2022 and a Brazilian adaptation premiered on August 24, 2022. In November 2023, the series was renewed for a ninth season set to be filmed in Las Vegas. The ninth season premiered on December 11, 2024. In July 2025, Netflix announced that the tenth season is going to be Queer Eye's final season and began filming in Washington, D.C. The tenth and final season premiered on January 21, 2026.

== "Fab Five" experts ==
- Antoni Porowski – Food and wine: expert on alcohol and food preparation
- Bobby Berk (seasons 1–8) and Jeremiah Brent (season 9-10) – Design: experts on interior design and home organization
- Jonathan Van Ness – Grooming: expert on hair, personal hygiene, and makeup
- Karamo Brown – Culture and lifestyle: expert on relationships and social interaction
- Tan France – Fashion: expert on clothing, fashion, and personal styling

== Production ==
Creator credit is given to David Collins. In contrast to the original series, which was filmed in the New York area, the first two seasons of the reboot were filmed in Atlanta and neighboring Georgia towns. Production moved to Kansas City, Missouri for the third and fourth seasons (beginning production on June 16, 2018), Philadelphia for the fifth season, Austin, Texas for the sixth, and New Orleans, Louisiana for the seventh and the eighth.

David Collins has said that he is interested in filming a season of Queer Eye in the Midwest, and that he would like to bring the Fab Five to his hometown, Cincinnati, Ohio: "I'm from Cincinnati, Ohio, born and raised. I would like to go the tristate region, Ohio, Indiana, and Kentucky, because you can base in Cincinnati and go across the bridge to Kentucky and go up the interstate to Indiana. The corn-fed midwestern folk are where I'm from—and I love actually being from Ohio, it's a great place to be from."

Speaking to Variety, interior design expert Bobby Berk stated that season 2 was filmed at the tail end of season one. The season features a new theme song by Betty Who. The season included an episode focused on Skyler who is a transgender man. Other makeover heroes include a Walmart employee, a young musician, a mayor, a woman, and a man trying to graduate college.

On June 6, 2018, it was reported that an episode was being filmed in the town of Yass, New South Wales in Australia. Yass was chosen due to the fact that "its name matches one of the boys' favorite sayings: 'yaass'".

The four–episode special season, Queer Eye: We're in Japan! features Kiko Mizuhara as the Fab Five's Tokyo tour guide, and Naomi Watanabe makes a special appearance.

On November 13, 2023, Netflix renewed the series for a ninth season set to be filmed in Las Vegas. On that same day, it was reported that the eighth season would be Berk's final season. On February 27, 2024, it was announced that Jeremiah Brent joined the Fab Five as the interior design expert for the ninth season, replacing Berk. On July 9, 2025, Netflix announced that the tenth season would be the final season for Queer Eye and filming for the season had started in Washington, D.C.

== Release ==
All eight episodes of the first series were released on Netflix on February 7, 2018. Netflix's provided maturity rating is TV-14.

The series was renewed for a second season that aired on June 15, 2018.

On June 21, 2018, the 20-minute Yass episode was released online.

In June 2019, the series was renewed for a fourth and fifth season. The fourth season was released on July 19, 2019.

A four–episode special season called Queer Eye: We're in Japan! was released on November 1, 2019.

On March 11, 2020, Netflix renewed the series for a sixth season to be filmed in Austin, Texas. On May 14, 2020, it was announced that the series' fifth season would be released on June 5, 2020, and would consist of 10 episodes filmed in Philadelphia, Pennsylvania.

A special episode was released on YouTube on July 7, 2021, featuring a makeover of William Holmes.

Nexstar, Sinclair, and Hearst entered Queer Eye in syndication on September 10, 2018 in local markets

The sixth season was released on December 31, 2021. The seventh season was released in May 2023. The eighth season premiered on January 24, 2024, and was filmed in New Orleans. The ninth season was released on December 11, 2024. The tenth and final season premiered on January 21, 2026.

== Episodes ==
Season	Episodes	Originally released
1	8	February 7, 2018
2	8	June 15, 2018
Special		June 21, 2018
3	8	March 15, 2019
4	8	July 19, 2019
Japan	4	November 1, 2019
5	10	June 5, 2020
Special		July 7, 2021
6	10	December 31, 2021
7	7	May 12, 2023
8	6	January 24, 2024
9	10	December 11, 2024
10	5	January 21, 2026

=== Season 1 (2018) ===
No. overall	No. in season	Title	Hero	Filming location	Original release date
1	1	"You Can't Fix Ugly"	Tom	Dallas, Georgia	February 7, 2018
Tom is a divorced 57-year-old nominated by his daughter. The team helps him prepare for a date at a car show at the end of the week. Tom has lupus, and needs special help with skin care and color choices. Bobby creates an outdoor entertainment area in the back yard. The date is successful and Tom is ready to carry forward with the changes he's implemented during the visit.
2	2	"Saving Sasquatch"	Neal	Atlanta, Georgia	February 7, 2018
Neal is a 36-year-old programmer who is hosting an app release party at the end of the week. A loner, he has erected physical and emotional barriers that prevent people from getting too close. The house is covered in dog hair and gets a serious cleaning along with new furniture. Jonathan modernizes Neal's hair and beard, and Tan brings his wardrobe up to date to better suit his career. By the end of the week, Neal feels more confident, is ready to socialize more, and is prepared to continue with the improvements he has learned.
3	3	"Dega Don't"	Cory	Winder, Georgia	February 7, 2018
Cory is a 36-year-old former Marine and NASCAR fan. At the start of the episode, the Fab Five are pulled over by the police. Karamo, who is driving, is particularly alarmed because of the recent violent incidents and shootings across the United States involving black people and the police. Later, Karamo and Cory have a discussion about this topic and the need to build trust between good cops and civilians. Cory says at the end of the episode that conversation was the highlight of the week for him. Bobby modifies the spaces on the main floor of Cory's house so Cory will feel more comfortable in his own home. Antoni provides nutritional advice and teaches Cory how to make an avocado-grapefruit appetizer. The family goes together to the musical Finding Neverland at the conclusion of the show.
4	4	"To Gay or Not Too Gay"	AJ	Atlanta, Georgia	February 7, 2018
AJ is a 32-year-old gay civil engineer who plans to come out to his stepmother at the end of the week. He regrets having never come out to his father before he died. Karamo helps him work through his emotions regarding this topic. Antoni and AJ visit his stepmother to learn how to make tamales and to invite her to the party AJ plans on hosting. Bobby cleans and reorganizes AJ's apartment to convert it from a mancave to a functional living space. Jonathan teaches him how to edge his beard and hair. Tan helps him choose clothes with various looks, from conservative to casual to sexual. At the party at the end of the week, AJ reads his stepmother a letter he's written to his father where he explains that he's gay, and how he regrets never coming out to him. His stepmother says she will always be there for him and accepts him the way he is.
5	5	"Camp Rules"	Bobby	Marietta, Georgia	February 7, 2018
Bobby is a 48-year-old father of 6 children. He holds down two jobs to support his family and has a very chaotic home life. He and his wife had a disastrous wedding with no photos and no first dance. His wife nominated him for a makeover to thank him for all he does for the family. The house is extremely cluttered. Antoni struggles to organize the kitchen while Jonathan and Tan convince Bobby to make self-care more of a priority. Fab 5 Bobby talks about how the house needs to be better organized and the children need to help with chores. He starts a vegetable garden with the intention that the children will help look after it and also creates a chore chart. At a potluck at the end of the week, Bobby and his wife finally get a replacement for the wedding reception that went awry the first time around.
6	6	"The Renaissance of Remington"	Remington aka Remy	Atlanta, Georgia	February 7, 2018
Remy is a 27-year-old who lives in his grandmother's house, which hasn't been renovated since the 70s. He often wears gym clothes and has limited cooking skills. Remy wants to learn to be more cultured, and learn how to cook for his family.
7	7	"Below Average Joe"	Joe	Norcross, Georgia	February 7, 2018
Joe is a 33-year-old comedian who still lives at home, and was nominated by his parents. He has recently lost a substantial amount of weight, but lacks confidence. The Fab 5 help him learn how to dress for his new body and present himself confidently, and move in to his parents' basement so he has a more adult space.
8	8	"Hose Before Bros"	Jeremy	Covington, Georgia	February 7, 2018
Jeremy, a fireman, loves to help people and trains other firefighters. He's a prankster, but takes his job very seriously. He's married to Bonnie, and has five adopted children who are all biological siblings. The Fab 5 make over the firehouse and prepare for a fundraiser there at the end of the week.

=== Season 2 (2018) ===
No. overall	No. in season	Title	Hero	Filming location	Original release date
9	1	"God Bless Gay"	Tammye	Gay, Georgia	June 15, 2018
Tammye is the first woman the Fab 5 have made over. She is a married teacher who is heavily involved in the church and her community. She was also diagnosed with cancer, along with two other family members, and the Fab 5 help Tammye prepare for the community's Homecoming event at the end of the week.
10	2	"A Decent Proposal"	William	Dahlonega, Georgia	June 15, 2018
41-year-old William works at Walmart and lives with his girlfriend of three years, Shannan. He is socially anxious, and lives in a house surrounded by furniture Shannan bought with her ex-husband. He is a vegetarian, loves sci-fi films, and is terrified of heartbreak. He wants the Fab 5's help to propose to Shannan.
11	3	"Unleash the Sexy Beast"	Leo	Decatur, Georgia	June 15, 2018
Leo, a bartender and married father of two, was nominated by his wife Bethany because he is a 'ginormous slob'. He's attending a parent-teacher mixer at the end of the week, and wants the Fab 5's help to make a good impression and form some relationships with other parents.
12	4	"The Handyman Can"	Jason	Atlanta, Georgia	June 15, 2018
Jason, a single handyman, wants to improve his life and move to Reno. The Fab 5 swoop in to help him throw a party for his close circle of friends.
13	5	"Sky's the Limit"	Skyler	Athens, Georgia	June 15, 2018
Skyler, a trans man, has just recovered from his top surgery and needs to have his legal identity reflect his true gender. The Fab 5 help him redesign his apartment and throw a celebration at his favorite bar. Special guest appearance by Todrick Hall.
14	6	"Big Little Lies"	Arian	Duluth, Georgia	June 15, 2018
After running into problems with his university degree, Arian has slipped into a funk. His best friend from middle school nominates him so that the Fab 5 help him get off the couch and come clean to his family about his degree.
15	7	"Bedazzled"	Sean	Maysville, Georgia	June 15, 2018
Teenage pianist Sean gets nominated by his godmother Lulu. The Fab 5 descend on his small town to give him a modern makeover and help him move out for college.
16	8	"Make Ted Great Again"	Ted	Clarkston, Georgia	June 15, 2018
The unconventional mayor of "the Ellis Island of the South" is nominated by his girlfriend. The Fab 5 help him reorder his life so he can better perform his mayoral duties and socialize with international dignitaries.

=== Special (2018) ===
No. overall	No. in season	Title	Hero	Filming location	Original release date
17	1	"Yass, Australia!"	George	Yass, New South Wales	June 21, 2018
The Fab Five visit the town of Yass, New South Wales, to make over George, a farmer in his 50s. Karamo offers advice on creating a better work-life balance so George will have more time for friends and family. Jonathan and Tan work on improving his self-care and wardrobe. Bobby remodels the local bistro and Antoni creates some new menu items using local ingredients.

=== Season 3 (2019) ===
No. overall	No. in season	Title	Hero	Filming location	Original release date
18	1	"From Hunter to Huntee"	Jody	Amazonia, Missouri	March 15, 2019
Jody is a 49-year-old farmer and prison guard nominated by her husband Chris. They both love to hunt and they both love to wear camo clothing. Chris wants to take her out for their 10th anniversary but he knows she feels uncomfortable in more formal settings. Antoni takes her to a high-end restaurant for lunch to help her acclimate to that kind of environment. Jonathan cuts and styles her hair, as well as evens out the color and gives her a lesson in walking in high heels. Tan helps her revamp her wardrobe and she learns how to walk in heels. At the end of the week, the Fab 5 arrange a surprise visit from her family. Chris takes her on a romantic gondola ride to celebrate their anniversary.
19	2	"Lost Boy"	Joey	La Cygne, Kansas	March 15, 2019
Joey is a divorced man who has recently taken a job as program director at a children's summer camp. He was nominated by his boss, who hopes Joey will learn some grooming and presentation techniques that will suit his new role better than what he is currently doing, which is nothing – not even basics like showering or brushing his teeth. Bobby gets furniture for and remodels Joey's new cabin, and Antoni teaches him a great pork barbecue dish to make at the cookout they are having at the end of the week. Karamo helps Joey reconnect with his son Isaac through an art project.
20	3	"Jones Bar-B-Q"	Deborah/"Little"; Mary/"Shorty"	Kansas City, Kansas	March 15, 2019
The Fab 5 help the owners of Jones Barb-B-Q, Deborah (Little) and Mary (Shorty), to improve both their self-confidence and their business after Izora, Deborah's daughter, nominated them. Antoni and Karamo help the sisters to get their special BBQ sauce ready for manufacturing and sale. The pair also get help with their outfits, and Deborah goes to the dentist to get her missing tooth replaced, which vastly helps to improve her self-confidence. At the end of the week, the sisters' BBQ shop has been completely redesigned to make it more accessible for them and ready for business.
21	4	"When Robert Met Jamie"	Robert	Kansas City, Missouri	March 15, 2019
Robert is an overweight man with self-esteem and body image issues. He and Jamie are getting married at the end of the week and he wants to look and feel great at the wedding. The basement is a man cave disaster, and Tan is ready to discard almost all of Robert's wardrobe. Bobby and Antoni take Robert to Orange Fitness to show him that taking care of himself can help build self-esteem. Karamo helps him understand how many good qualities he has, and that the only person saying bad things about him is himself. Robert is already a great cook, but Antoni demonstrates how to make healthier choices that are still delicious. Bobby remodels the master bedroom to reclaim it for the adults – one of their daughters has been using it as her room – as well as redecorating the rest of the house. At the end of the week Robert promises to stop the self-deprecating and be kinder to himself.
22	5	"Black Girl Magic"	Jess	Lawrence, Kansas	March 15, 2019
Jess is a 23-year-old lesbian whose adoptive parents kicked her out of the house when she was 16 when they found out her sexual orientation. She has friends who come and go, and the house doesn't have a sense of home or of permanence. Bobby and Antoni emphasize that it's okay to make connections with people or to ask for help. Bobby sets up a reunion with Jess's biological sister, Jenise. Jonathan cuts Jess's hair to remove the treated portion, and she plans on wearing her natural curls from now on. At the end of the week, she comments how supportive and accepting the Fab Five were to her, and how much she admires Karamo and looks up to him as a role model as a successful gay black person.
23	6	"Elrod & Sons"	Rob	Olathe, Kansas	March 15, 2019
Rob is a widowed, single father who has put his life on hold since his wife died two years ago. He is moving into a new house and has a housewarming party planned for the end of the week. Antoni works with him on a couple of healthier meals that he could make for his children and Tan shows him how to select clothing for his children as well as himself. Bobby helps him with the last of the packing as Rob says a tearful farewell to the old house and the memories it holds.
24	7	"Sloth to Slay"	Thomas	Kansas City, Missouri	March 15, 2019
Thomas is an asocial 21-year-old, living with his sister in Missouri, who spends most of his time behind a screen meaning that the majority of his friends are made through video gaming. The Fab 5 surprise him on his birthday whilst he is getting the bus to work and proceed to transform both him and his life, agreeing to transform him from a sloth (a nickname he earned in high school) to someone who 'slays'. Thomas is encouraged to knock down both literal and metaphorical walls and the Fab 5 get him to connect with a local anime group. At the end of their time together Thomas has a birthday party to let everyone see his new look and style, especially his sister Krissy.
25	8	"Baby on Board"	Tony	Lee's Summit, Missouri	March 15, 2019
Tony is nominated by his girlfriend Bri. They are expecting a baby soon and he needs help preparing himself mentally as well as cleaning up the physical space where they live. The Fab 5 discover the entire house is a mess, and they have a lot of work to do while teaching Tony some organizational skills and how to overcome his procrastination. Karamo finds a teacher that shows Tony some basic baby care skills. Bobby cleans the house and redecorates to give the family a clean slate. At the end of the week, Tony feels he has developed the confidence he needs to begin this next phase of his life, and knows that it is okay to ask for help. The episode ends with a surprise marriage proposal and a special guest appearance by Jenna Phelps.

=== Season 4 (2019) ===
No. overall	No. in season	Title	Hero	Filming location	Original release date
26	1	"Without Further Ado"	Kathi	Quincy, Illinois	July 19, 2019
Kathi, the music director at Quincy Senior High School, is Jonathan's former music teacher. She has not changed her mullet hairstyle since the 1980s. Kathi is nominated by her assistant, Sarah, who wants Kathi to put herself first instead of last. The Fab 5 give Kathi a makeover in time for her appearance as grand marshal at the Octoberfest Parade. They also help her raise money at the annual music department fundraiser. Bobby redecorates the teachers' lounge and renames it as the "Dooley Den" after Kathi so that teachers would actually use the lounge. Antoni teaches Kathi's students to make Blue Deviled Potatoes which consist of queso and blue potatoes as part of the fundraiser. Tan takes her shopping to upgrade her wardrobe for a more sophisticated and age-appropriate look. Jonathan chops off her mullet to give a more modern and flattering hairstyle. Karamo helps Kathi realize that she needs to do more activities outside of school. He contacts Kathi's former student, Ryan, who worked on the Broadway musical Waitress, who gives her and her husband first-class plane tickets as well as free tickets to go see the musical.
27	2	"Disabled but Not Really"	Wesley	Kansas City, Missouri	July 19, 2019
Wesley is a 30-year-old community activist who is also the founder of a nonprofit organization called "Disabled But Not Really" and a single father to a 10-year-old girl named Nevaeh which is Heaven spelled backward. His mother, Dawn, nominated him because she wants him to have more independence. Wesley became paralyzed after being shot several times when he was 24. He reveals he was a "bad boy" before the accident. The Fab 5 descend on his small town to help him feel good about himself to get ready for a "Disabled But Not Really" fundraiser. Bobby renovates his house to make it wheelchair accessible. Tan helps him dress more professionally, but also comfortably. Karamo sets up a meeting for Wesley and Maurice, the man who shot him, so that Wesley can have closure and move to the next chapter in his life.
28	3	"Stoner Skates By"	John	Kansas City, Missouri	July 19, 2019
John is a 38-year-old single divorced father and a healthcare consultant who often works from home. He co-parents with his ex-wife Julie, who is still on good terms with him. John is nominated by his 10-year-old daughter Lucy because she wants him to act more like a parent than a child. The Fab 5's mission is to help John become the proud father for Lucy at her figure skating competition. Bobby revamps John's home to make it more grown-up and less of a frat boy's house as well as creating Lucy's own space so that she feels more at home. Antoni teaches John how to prepare almond flour pancakes for Lucy. Tan takes John to Houndstooth, a men's clothing store, to upgrade his wardrobe and give him a more mature look. Jonathan invites Olympic medalist Michelle Kwan to help Lucy perfect her landing. John opens up to Karamo about how he suffers from depression and that he doesn't really talk anyone about it. John is highly motivated at the end of the week to follow through with the further work that needs to be done to make his and Lucy's life better going forward.
29	4	"How Wanda Got Her Groove Back"	Wanda	Kansas City, Missouri	July 19, 2019
30	5	"On Golden Kenny"	Kenny	Kansas City, Kansas	July 19, 2019
Kenny is a retired bachelor whose dusty home seemed stuck in the past. Nominated by his sister Kathy and her two daughters, Kenny came to embrace all of the changes to his home and appearance, showing tremendous gratitude for the work of the Fab Five. Near the end of the transformation, he announced that he had decided to name his newly adopted ASPCA rescue dog "Fab Five."
31	6	"A Tale of Two Cultures"	Deanna	Kansas City, Missouri	July 19, 2019
32	7	"Soldier Returns Home"	Brandonn	Kansas City, Missouri	July 19, 2019
33	8	"Farm to Able"	Matt	Harrisonville, Missouri	July 19, 2019

=== We're in Japan! (2019) ===
No. overall	No. in season	Title	Hero	Filming location	Original release date
34	1	"Japanese Holiday"	Yoko	Mitaka City, Tokyo	November 1, 2019
35	2	"Crazy in Love"	Kan	Ni-chome, Shinjuku, Tokyo	November 1, 2019
36	3	"The Ideal Woman"	Kae	Naka-ku, Yokohama	November 1, 2019
37	4	"Bringing Sexy Back"	Makoto	Tabata, Tokyo	November 1, 2019

=== Season 5 (2020) ===
No. overall	No. in season	Title	Hero	Filming location	Original release date
38	1	"Preaching Out Loud"	Noah	Fishtown, Philadelphia, Pennsylvania	June 5, 2020
39	2	"Groomer Has It"	Rahanna	Germantown, Philadelphia, Pennsylvania	June 5, 2020
40	3	"Father of the Bride"	Kevin	Norristown, Pennsylvania	June 5, 2020
41	4	"The North Philadelphia Story"	Tyreek	Fishtown, Philadelphia, Pennsylvania	June 5, 2020
42	5	"The Anxious Activist"	Abby	Philadelphia, Pennsylvania	June 5, 2020
43	6	"DJ's on Repeat"	Ryan	Point Pleasant Beach, New Jersey	June 5, 2020
44	7	"Silver Lining Sweeney"	Jennifer	Glenolden, Pennsylvania	June 5, 2020
45	8	"Father Knows Fish"	Marcos	Philadelphia, Pennsylvania	June 5, 2020
46	9	"Paging Dr. Yi"	Lilly	Wyomissing, Pennsylvania	June 5, 2020
47	10	"Body Rock or Bust"	Nate	West Philadelphia, Pennsylvania	June 5, 2020

=== Special (2021) ===
No. overall	No. in season	Title	Hero	Filming location	Original release date
48	1	"Where There's a Will..."	William Holmes	Philadelphia, Pennsylvania	July 7, 2021 on YouTube

=== Season 6 (2021) ===
No. overall	No. in season	Title	Hero	Filming location	Original release date
49	1	"Showdown at the Broken Spoke"	Terri	Austin, Texas	December 31, 2021
50	2	"Angel Gets Her Wings"	Angel	Austin, Texas	December 31, 2021
51	3	"No More Bull"	Josh	Austin, Texas	December 31, 2021
52	4	"A Night to Remember"	Navarro Early College High School's Prom Committee	Austin, Texas	December 31, 2021
53	5	"Craw-Zaddy"	Todd	Canyon Lake, Texas	December 31, 2021
54	6	"Community Allied"	Dr. Jereka, EdD	Austin, Texas	December 31, 2021
Dr. Jereka is a Black health educator and founder of the Central Texas Allied Health Institute, which prepares students for careers as Healthcare technician in the medical field, especially to enable students to break the cycle of poverty. She also runs a clinic in a low-income neighborhood which has administered 13,000 COVID-19 tests free of charge and vaccinated 3,000 people against COVID-19. She works to address vaccine hesitancy, misinformation, and overall the pandemic's disproportionate impact on Black and Latino communities. Her makeover includes acceptance of her natural hair, dressing in styles that flatter her body type, and the remodel of the employee break room at the clinic.
55	7	"Snow White of Central Texas"	Jamie	Leander, Texas	December 31, 2021
Jamie is the founder of the ten acre animal sanctuary Safe In Austin with a focus on special needs, which is home to more than 100 rescued animals including cows, pigs, goats, chickens, cats, dogs, and horses.
56	8	"Gimme Shelter"	Chris	Austin, Texas	December 31, 2021
Chris runs the nonprofit organization called The Other One Foundation, serving people experiencing homelessness, including transitional shelter, hygiene access, and employment opportunities. He recently lost weight due to a gastric sleeve, so his clothing is oversized. He is raising funds for a project to upgrade the current tent city into permanent building structures. His makeover helps him represent his organization professionally to successfully solicit donations and grants to fund the project.
57	9	"A Legend in the Baking"	Sarah	Austin, Texas	December 31, 2021
58	10	"The Mis-Inspiration of Reggie Devore"	Reggie	Manor, Texas	December 31, 2021

=== Season 7 (2023) ===
No. overall	No. in season	Title	Hero	Filming location	Original release date
59	1	"Queer Eye for the Lambda Chi"	Fraternity brothers of Lambda Chi Alpha	University of New Orleans, New Orleans, Louisiana	May 12, 2023
60	2	"Superfan Steph"	Stephanie	Metairie, Louisiana	May 12, 2023
61	3	"Speedy for Life"	Speedy	New Orleans, Louisiana	May 12, 2023
62	4	"Jenni Seckel's Diary"	Jenni	New Orleans, Louisiana	May 12, 2023
63	5	"Deli Dan Is a Dream Man"	Dan	New Orleans, Louisiana	May 12, 2023
64	6	"Ms. Mary Quite Contrary"	Mary	New Orleans, Louisiana	May 12, 2023
65	7	"Sowing the Seeds"	Michael	Central City, New Orleans, Louisiana	May 12, 2023

=== Season 8 (2024) ===
No. overall	No. in season	Title	Hero	Filming location	Original release date
66	1	"Mr. Fantastic!"	Ernest	New Orleans, Louisiana	January 24, 2024
67	2	"Kiss the Sky"	Tim	New Orleans, Louisiana	January 24, 2024
68	3	"The Sweet Life"	Doreen	New Orleans, Louisiana; Harvey, Louisiana	January 24, 2024
69	4	"Protect the Nest"	Denton	Baton Rouge, Louisiana	January 24, 2024
70	5	"The Flying Nun"	Alison	Gentilly, New Orleans, Louisiana	January 24, 2024
71	6	"When I Say Sexy, You Say"	Anh	New Orleans, Louisiana	January 24, 2024

=== Season 9 (2024) ===
No. overall	No. in season	Title	Hero	Filming location	Original release date
72	1	"She Was a Showgirl"	Paula	Las Vegas, Nevada	December 11, 2024
73	2	"Special Delivery"	Nicole	Las Vegas, Nevada	December 11, 2024
74	3	"Poof Goes Piff!"	Piff the Magic Dragon (John)	Las Vegas, Nevada	December 11, 2024
75	4	"The Snack Attack Is Back"	Clyde	Las Vegas, Nevada	December 11, 2024
76	5	"Five Gays and a Wedding"	Alexis & Kevin	Las Vegas, Nevada	December 11, 2024
77	6	"Mother's Day Slay"	Jen'ya	Las Vegas, Nevada	December 11, 2024
78	7	"Chris Takes the Wheel"	Chris	Las Vegas, Nevada	December 11, 2024
79	8	"Are You There, Fab 5? It's Me, Billy"	Billy	Las Vegas, Nevada	December 11, 2024
80	9	"Sara Ralda's Day Off"	Sara	Las Vegas, Nevada	December 11, 2024
81	10	"Merlin Gets a Makeover"	Sean	Las Vegas, Nevada	December 11, 2024

=== Season 10 (2026) ===
No. overall	No. in season	Title	Hero	Filming location	Original release date
82	1	"Sister, You Are Welcome Here"	Dorriene and Jo	Washington D.C.	January 21, 2026
83	2	"Back to School Burnout"	Mike	Washington D.C.	January 21, 2026
84	3	"Coming In Hot"	Kate	Silver Spring, Maryland	January 21, 2026
85	4	"Queer Eye-Eye, Captain"	Greg	Washington D.C.	January 21, 2026
86	5	"Finding Father"	Nick	Arlington, Virginia	January 21, 2026

== Reception ==
Critical response of Queer Eye
Season	Rotten Tomatoes	Metacritic
1	97% (32 reviews)	73 (9 reviews)
2	87% (30 reviews)	79 (8 reviews)
3	92% (12 reviews)	TBD (2 reviews)
4	92% (12 reviews)	TBD (3 reviews)
5	100% (6 reviews)	TBD (1 review)

On review aggregator website Rotten Tomatoes, the first season holds an approval rating of 97% based on 32 reviews, and an average rating of 8.23/10. The website's critical consensus reads, "Queer Eye adapts for a different era without losing its style, charm, or sense of fun, proving that the show's formula remains just as sweetly addictive even after a change in location and a new group of hosts." On Metacritic, the season has a weighted average score of 73 out of 100, based on 9 critics, indicating "generally favorable reviews".

The second season has an 87% approval rating on Rotten Tomatoes, based on 30 reviews, with an average rating of 8.36/10. The site's critical consensus reads, "Earnest and endearing, Queer Eye's tear-inducing reality wiles continue to challenge social norms — and, in its best moments, the Fab Five themselves." On Metacritic, it has a score of 79 out of 100, based on 8 critics, indicating "generally favorable reviews".

The third season has an approval rating of 92% based on 12 reviews, with an average rating of 8/10 on Rotten Tomatoes. The website's critical consensus reads, "Affirming and uplifting as ever, Queer Eye's third season settles into a nearly formulaic groove — thankfully the concoction continues to work like gangbusters thanks to the Fab Five's comforting Midas touch."

The fourth season has an approval rating of 92% based on 12 reviews with an average rating of 8/10 on Rotten Tomatoes. The website's critical consensus reads, "The Fab Five keep going deeper and just keep getting better — Can you believe?"

The fifth season has an approval rating of 100% based on 6 reviews, with an average rating of 8/10 on Rotten Tomatoes.

== Awards and nominations ==
Year	Award	Category	Recipients	Result	Ref.
2018	Primetime Emmy Awards	Outstanding Structured Reality Program	David Collins, Michael Williams, Rob Eric, Jennifer Lane, Adam Sher, David George, David Eilenberg, Jordana Hochman, Mark Bracero, and Rachelle Mendez	Won	
2018	Primetime Emmy Awards	Outstanding Casting for a Reality Program	Ally Capriotti Grant, Beyhan Oguz, Gretchen Palek, and Danielle Gervais	Won	
2018	Primetime Emmy Awards	Outstanding Cinematography for a Reality Program	Garrett Rose (for "To Gay or Not Too Gay")	Nominated	
2018	Primetime Emmy Awards	Outstanding Picture Editing for a Structured or Competition Reality Program	Thomas Scott Reuther, Joe DeShano, A.M. Peters, Nova Taylor, Matthew D. Miller, and Brian Ray	Won	
2018	People's Choice Awards	The Revival Show of 2018	Queer Eye	Nominated	
2018	People's Choice Awards	The Reality Show of 2018	Queer Eye	Nominated	
2018	People's Choice Awards	The Bingeworthy Show of 2018	Queer Eye	Nominated	
2018	People's Choice Awards	The Reality TV Star of 2018	Antoni Porowski	Nominated	
2018	TCA Awards	Outstanding Achievement in Reality Programming	Queer Eye	Won	
2019	GLAAD Media Awards	Outstanding Reality Program	Queer Eye	Won	
2019	Primetime Emmy Awards	Outstanding Structured Reality Program	David Collins, Michael Williams, Rob Eric, Jennifer Lane, Adam Sher, David George, David Eilenberg, Jordana Hochman, Mark Bracero, and Rachelle Mendez	Won	
2019	Primetime Emmy Awards	Outstanding Casting for a Reality Program	Ally Grant, Pamela Vallarelli, Gretchen Palek, Danielle Gervais, and Quinn Fegan	Won	
2019	Primetime Emmy Awards	Outstanding Cinematography for a Reality Program	Garrett Rose (for "God Bless Gay")	Nominated	
2019	Primetime Emmy Awards	Outstanding Directing for a Reality Program	Hisham Abed (for "Black Girl Magic")	Won	
2019	Primetime Emmy Awards	Outstanding Picture Editing for a Structured Reality or Competition Program	Joseph Deshano, Matthew Miller, Nova Taylor, Carlos Gamarra, Iain Tibbles, and Tony Zajkowski	Won	
2019	Primetime Emmy Awards	Outstanding Production Design for a Variety, Reality or Competition Series	Thomas Rouse (for "Jones Bar-B-Q")	Nominated	
2019	TCA Awards	Outstanding Achievement in Reality Programming	Queer Eye	Won	
2020	Casting Society of America	Reality Series	Gretchen Palek, Danielle Gervais, Ally Capriotti Grant, and Quinn Fegan	Won	
2020	GLAAD Media Awards	Outstanding Reality Program	Queer Eye	Nominated	
2020	Primetime Emmy Awards	Outstanding Structured Reality Program	David Collins, Michael Williams, Rob Eric, Jennifer Lane, Adam Sher, David George, David Eilenberg, Jordana Hochman, Mark Bracero, and Rachelle Mendez	Won	
2020	Primetime Emmy Awards	Outstanding Casting for a Reality Program	Danielle Gervais, Beyhan Oguz, Pamela Vallarelli, Ally Capriotti Grant, and Hana Sakata	Nominated	
2020	Primetime Emmy Awards	Outstanding Cinematography for a Reality Program	Garrett Rose (for "We're in Japan!: Japanese Holiday")	Nominated	
2020	Primetime Emmy Awards	Outstanding Directing for a Reality Program	Hisham Abed (for "Disabled But Not Really")	Nominated	
2020	Primetime Emmy Awards	Outstanding Host for a Reality or Competition Program	Karamo Brown, Antoni Porowski, Tan France, Bobby Berk, and Jonathan Van Ness	Nominated	
2020	Primetime Emmy Awards	Outstanding Picture Editing for a Structured Reality or Competition Program	Nova Taylor and Tony Zajkowski (for "Disabled But Not Really")	Nominated	
2020	Primetime Emmy Awards	Outstanding Production Design for a Variety, Reality or Competition Series	Thomas Rouse (for "We're in Japan!: Japanese Holiday")	Nominated	
2021	Casting Society of America	Reality Series	Danielle Gervais, Beyhan Oguz and Pamela Vallarelli, and Ally Capriotti Grant	Won	
2021	GLAAD Media Awards	Outstanding Reality Program	Queer Eye	Nominated	
2021	Hollywood Critics Association TV Awards	Best Cable or Streaming Reality Series, Competition Series, or Game Show	Queer Eye	Nominated	
2021	Primetime Creative Arts Emmy Awards	Outstanding Structured Reality Program	David Collins, Michael Williams, Rob Eric, Jennifer Lane, Jordana Hochman, Rachelle Mendez, Mark Bracero, Adam Sher, David George, David Eilenberg, and Bernard Parham Jr.	Won	
2021	Primetime Creative Arts Emmy Awards	Outstanding Casting for a Reality Program	Danielle Gervais, Natalie Pino, MaryAnne Nicoletti, Pamela Vallarelli, and Ally Capriotti Grant	Nominated	
2021	Primetime Creative Arts Emmy Awards	Outstanding Cinematography for a Reality Program	Garrett Rose (for "Groomer Has It")	Nominated	
2021	Primetime Creative Arts Emmy Awards	Outstanding Directing for a Reality Program	Mark Perez (for "Preaching Out Loud")	Nominated	
2021	Primetime Creative Arts Emmy Awards	Outstanding Picture Editing for a Structured Reality or Competition Program	Kris Byrnes, Susan Maridueña Barrett, Nathan Ochiltree, Tony Zajkowski, Carlos J. Gamarra, and Brian Ray (for "Preaching Out Loud")	Nominated	
2021	Primetime Creative Arts Emmy Awards	Outstanding Host for a Reality or Competition Program	Bobby Berk, Karamo Brown, Tan France, Antoni Porowski, and Jonathan Van Ness	Nominated	
2022	GLAAD Media Awards	Outstanding Reality Program	Queer Eye	Nominated	
2022	Hollywood Critics Association TV Awards	Best Streaming Reality Show or Competition Series	Queer Eye	Nominated	
2022	Primetime Creative Arts Emmy Awards	Outstanding Structured Reality Program	David Collins, Michael Williams, Rob Eric, Jennifer Lane, Jordana Hochman, Mark Bracero, Lyndsey Burr, Westley Harris, Jenifer Lerman, Shay Caldwell, and Solange Gomez	Won	
2022	Primetime Creative Arts Emmy Awards	Outstanding Host for a Reality or Competition Program	Bobby Berk, Karamo Brown, Tan France, Antoni Porowski, and Jonathan Van Ness	Nominated	
2022	Primetime Creative Arts Emmy Awards	Outstanding Production Design for a Variety, Reality or Competition Series	Thomas Rouse and Josh Smith (for "Angel Gets Her Wings")	Nominated	
2022	Primetime Creative Arts Emmy Awards	Outstanding Casting for a Reality Program	Danielle Gervais, Jessica Jorgensen, Natalie Pino, Pamela Vallarelli, and Quinn Fegan	Nominated	
2022	Primetime Creative Arts Emmy Awards	Outstanding Directing for a Reality Program	Aaron Krummel (for "Angel Gets Her Wings")	Nominated	
2022	Primetime Creative Arts Emmy Awards	Outstanding Picture Editing for a Structured Reality or Competition Program	Nova Taylor and Sean Gill (for "Angel Gets Her Wings")	Nominated	
2023	Critics' Choice Real TV Awards	Best Lifestyle Show: Fashion/Beauty	Queer Eye	Won	
2023	Primetime Creative Arts Emmy Awards	Outstanding Structured Reality Program	David Collins, Michael Williams, Rob Eric, Jennifer Lane, Jordana Hochman and Mark Bracero, executive producers; Kori Kingg, co-executive producer; Jenifer Lerman, supervising producer; Bobby Berk, Karamo Brown, Tan France, Antoni Porowski and Jonathan Van Ness, producers	Won	
2023	Primetime Creative Arts Emmy Awards	Outstanding Host for a Reality or Competition Program	Bobby Berk, Karamo Brown, Tan France, Antoni Porowski, and Jonathan Van Ness	Nominated	
2023	Primetime Creative Arts Emmy Awards	Outstanding Production Design for a Variety, Reality or Competition Series	Thomas Rouse and Tyka Edwards (for "Speedy for Life")	Nominated	
2023	Primetime Creative Arts Emmy Awards	Outstanding Casting for a Reality Program	Quinn Fegan, Jessica Jorgensen, Keya Mason, and Lauren Levine	Nominated	
2023	Primetime Creative Arts Emmy Awards	Outstanding Directing for a Reality Program	Ali Moghadas (for "Speedy for Life")	Nominated	
2023	Primetime Creative Arts Emmy Awards	Outstanding Picture Editing for a Structured Reality or Competition Program	Toni Ann Carabello, Nova Taylor, Jason Szabo, Widgie Nikia Figaro, Sean Gill, and Kimberly Pellnat (for "Speedy for Life")	Nominated	
2024	Astra Creative Arts TV Awards	Best Streaming Reality or Competition Series	Queer Eye	Nominated	
2024	Primetime Creative Arts Emmy Awards	Outstanding Structured Reality Program	David Collins, Michael Williams, Rob Eric, Jennifer Lane, Jordana Hochman and Mark Bracero, executive producers; Kori Kingg, co-executive producer; Bobby Berk, Karamo Brown, Tan France,Antoni Porowski, Jonathan Van Ness, Producers; and Jenifer Lerman, supervising producer;	Nominated	
2024	Primetime Creative Arts Emmy Awards	Outstanding Picture Editing for a Structured Reality or Competition Program	Jennifer Roth, Mickala Andres and Carlos J. Gamarrat (for "Kiss the Sky")	Nominated	
2025	Primetime Creative Arts Emmy Awards	Outstanding Casting for a Reality Program	Danielle Gervais, Jessica Jorgensen, Natalie Pino and Brian Puentes	Nominated	
2025	Primetime Creative Arts Emmy Awards	Outstanding Picture Editing for a Structured Reality or Competition Program	Jennifer Roth, Mickala Andres and Carlos J. Gamarrat (for "She Was a Showgirl")	Nominated	
2025	Primetime Creative Arts Emmy Awards	Outstanding Structured Reality Program	David Collins, Michael Williams, Rob Eric, Jennifer Lane, Jordana Hochman, Mark Bracero, Lyndsey Burr, Jeremiah Brent, Karamo Brown, Tan France, Antoni Porowski and Jonathan Van Ness, executive producers; Solange Gomez-Smith and Jenifer Lerman, supervising producers; Alexander Liley-Roth and Erin McKeon, producers	Won	

== Other appearances ==
=== Kesha and Keala Settle — "This Is Me (Reimagined)" ===
A music video of the Reimagined Remix of Kesha's This Is Me was released on December 20, 2018. In support of the VH1 Save the Music Foundation, the video features the men from the Netflix series, Queer Eye, Antoni Porowski, Jonathan Van Ness, Tan France, and Bobby Berk (Karamo Brown does not appear in the video), helping three students, Olivia, Timmy, and J'Shawn, and giving them a "Much More Than a Makeover" experience and help prepare them for a talent show shown at the end of the video. At the talent show, Timmy raps Missy Elliott's second verse while the song is played over him, then J'Shawn showcases his dance moves, and finally Olivia sings the bridge to the song and all three are met with praise. The video was directed by Jared Hogan.

=== Taylor Swift — "You Need to Calm Down" ===
The cast also appeared on Taylor Swift's "You Need to Calm Down" music video in June 2019, along with numerous other queer celebrities. The song and music video was portrayed as a celebration of the LGBTQ+ community and the music video ends with a call to sign a petition supporting the Equality Act which would protect LGBTQ+ people from discrimination. When there was some controversy around the video where some criticised Taylor Swift for being opportunistic in her public allyship, Tan France spoke up in support of Swift, calling her a "powerful ally".

=== Big Mouth – "Disclosure the Movie: The Musical" ===
The Fab Five voiced fictionalized versions of themselves in a 2019 episode of adult animated series, Big Mouth.

=== Lizzo x Queer Eye Music Video — "Soulmate" ===
The Fab Five appeared with American singer and rapper Lizzo as animated cartoon characters in her music video for the song "Soulmate." The music video was released at the end of June 2020 in celebration of Pride month.

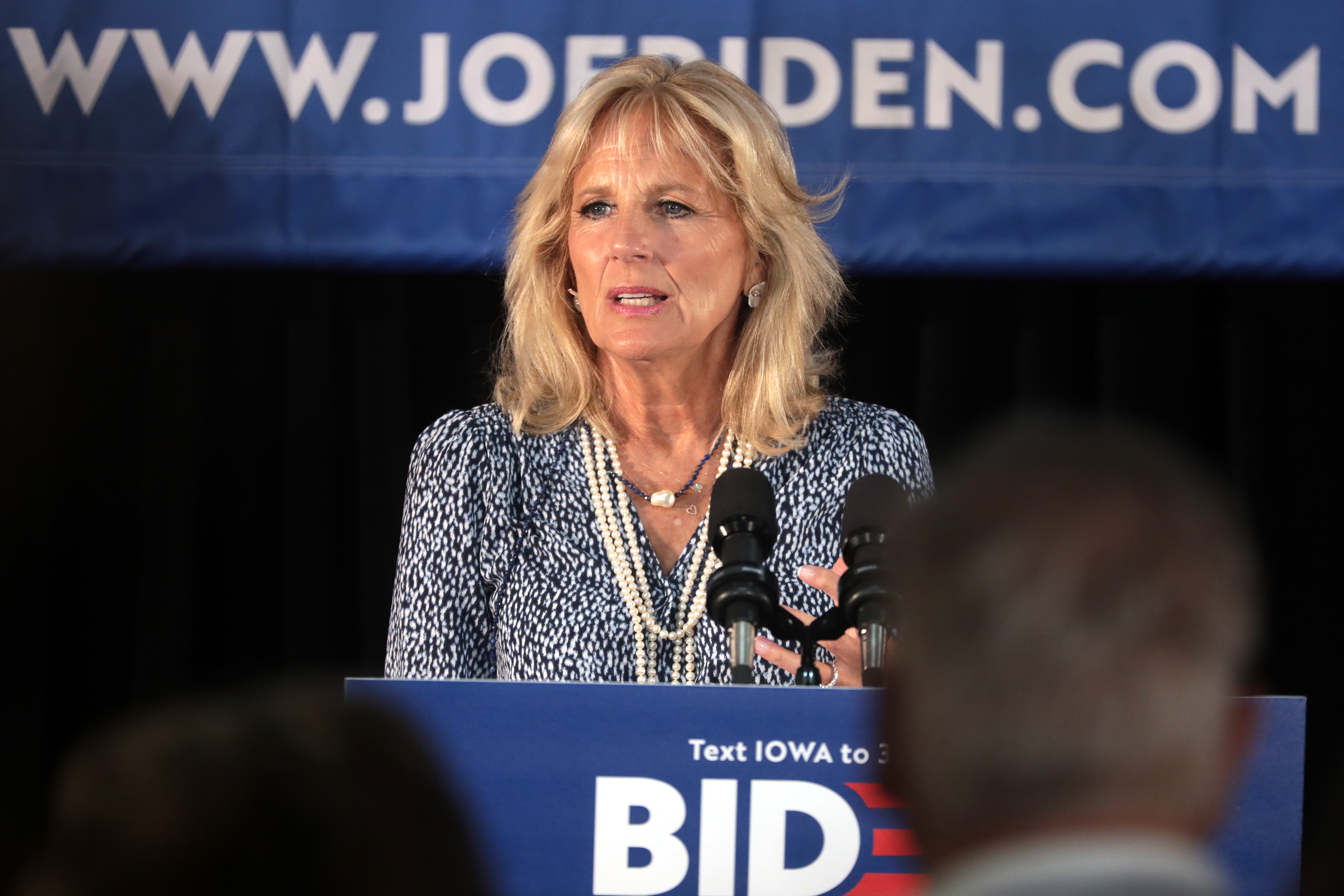
Jill Biden at a campaign fundraiser

=== Jill Biden fundraising campaign ===
In September 2020, the Queer Eye cast partnered with Jill Biden for a grassroots fundraiser for her husband Joe Biden's U.S. presidential campaign. The cast recorded a video with Jill Biden and advocated for Joe Biden to be the next U.S. president. In the video, the cast comments on the Trump administration and argues that Biden verbatim will be able to minimise the impact of but not limited to the COVID-19 pandemic, homeless veterans, environmental issues, trans and black lives.

Tan France was also vocal about his opinion on Trump's immigration policies. "What I will be thinking when I'm voting is… first, oh gosh, I feel a bit emotional. I'll be thinking of the fact that I am a representative of so many things that have been so negatively portrayed over the last three and a half years… We want to be respected. Muslims want to be respected, people of colour want be respected, the Black community wants to be respected, gay people want to be respected, trans people want to be respected."
