= Antoni Porowski =

Polish-Canadian television personality (born 1984)

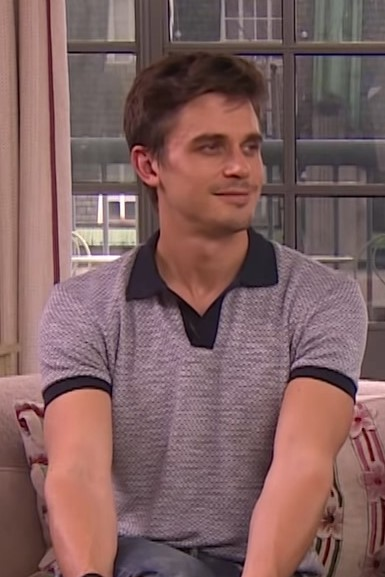
- Porowski in June 2018
- Born: Antoni Janusz Porowski; March 14, 1984 (age 42); Montreal, Quebec, Canada
- Education: Marianopolis College; Concordia University (BA); Neighborhood Playhouse School of the Theatre
- Occupations: Television personality; actor; model; author
- Years active: 2008–present
- Website: antoniporowski.com

Antoni Janusz Porowski (born March 14, 1984) is a Canadian television personality, cook, actor, model, and author. He is the food and wine expert on the Netflix series Queer Eye (2018–2026).

== Early life ==
Porowski was born in Montreal, Quebec, to Polish parents after they immigrated to Canada with his two older sisters. His father is a physician. He grew up speaking Polish, English and French. He and his parents moved to Glade Springs, West Virginia, when he was twelve years old; he resided between there and in Montreal throughout his high school years before returning to Montreal to complete his post-secondary education at Marianopolis College.

After graduating from Concordia University with a bachelor's degree in psychology, Porowski moved to New York City to study acting at the Neighborhood Playhouse School of the Theatre, from which he graduated in 2011. He taught himself to cook as a college student.

== Career ==
Upon moving to New York City, Porowski began auditioning for various acting roles. He has stated that his Polish last name made it difficult for him to find work, which at the time made him consider anglicizing his last name. He has landed roles in movies such as Elliot Loves (2012), Daddy's Boy (2016), The Pretenders (2018), and as the lead officer in a 2014 episode of TV series The Blacklist. Porowski was also featured in the 2015 short docudrama about the Vinnytsia massacre, To My Father, as Adam Bandrowski. The short film was part of the 2016 Cannes Film Festival's Short Film Corner.

In the meantime, he worked in food service to cover his rent, first working as a busboy at a family-run Polish restaurant. He worked his way up in the restaurant industry, working as a waiter and sommelier, eventually managing the sushi restaurant BondSt.

In December 2017, it was announced that Porowski was hired as the food and wine expert in the Netflix revival of Queer Eye, which began airing in February 2018.

In April 2018, Porowski signed a deal with Houghton Mifflin Harcourt for his first cookbook, released in spring 2019. In June 2018, he announced that he would be opening The Village Den, a fast-casual restaurant in New York City's West Village. Additionally, Porowski deals vintage furniture. In August 2018, Porowski hosted a Liberal Party of Canada event in Montreal with Prime Minister Justin Trudeau.

On September 10, 2018, Porowski alongside co-hosts of Queer Eye received an Emmy for Outstanding Structured Reality Program.

Porowski was featured in Taylor Swift's "You Need to Calm Down" music video, released on June 17, 2019.

In November 2019, he was named Sexiest Reality Star by People magazine.

In June 2021, Porowski announced he is part of the new Equaversity Foundation, established to organize international fundraising to support the LGBT+ community in Poland.

== Personal life ==
Porowski once lived in the same neighborhood of Brooklyn as Ted Allen, the original Queer Eye food and wine expert and current host of Food Network cooking competition Chopped. The two became friends, and for a time Porowski worked for Allen and his husband, designer Barry Rice, as their assistant, frequently cooking for the couple and helping them put together events and catering in their home.

Porowski states that his sexuality is "a little more fluid along the spectrum" and prefers not to label himself. He dated graphic artist Joey Krietemeyer for more than seven years before announcing their split in October 2018. He was engaged to brand strategy director Kevin Harrington before announcing their split in 2023.

In 2019, Porowski and his Queer Eye costar Jonathan Van Ness set up a joint Instagram account, and posted seemingly romantic photographs. They later clarified that it was in jest.

In 2018, Antoni paid tribute to fellow television food guru and chef Anthony Bourdain via Instagram.

After living in Brooklyn for years, in 2021, Porowski bought a 1,600-square-foot, three-bedroom apartment in NoHo, Manhattan for $4.4 million which he converted to a two-bedroom apartment. His friend and interior designer Andrew Torrey helped transform his apartment.

== Bibliography ==
- Antoni in the Kitchen (2019)
- Antoni: Let's Do Dinner (2021)

== Filmography ==
=== Film ===
Year	Title	Role	Notes
2008	The Diary	Eric	Short film
2011	The Apartment	Stranger	Short film
2012	Elliot Loves	Elliot's Father	
2013	Withdrawal	Louis	Short film
2015	To My Father	Adam Bandrowski	Short film
2016	Daddy's Boy	Christian	
2016	Blood Surf	Simon	
2018	Pretenders	Antoni	
2018	Horror Time	Jacob	
2023	Spoiler Alert	Sebastian	

=== Television and web ===
Year	Title	Role	Notes
2010	Blue Mountain State	Lacrosse Player	Episode: "LAX"
2014	The Blacklist	Lead Officer	Episode: "Monarch Douglas Bank"
2018–2026	Queer Eye	Himself	Series regular, 86 episodes
2018	Nailed It!	Himself	Guest Judge; Episode: "Bonus: 3,2,1...Ya Not Done!!"
2018	Don't Watch This	Himself	Episode: "Antoni Psycho"
2019	Lip Sync Battle	Himself	Season 5, Episode 1
2019	Big Mouth	Himself	Season 3
2019	Watch What Happens Live with Andy Cohen	Himself	Episode: "How Did Antoni Porowski And His 'Flipping Out' Beau Meet?"
2019	The Daily Show with Trevor Noah	Himself	Episode: "Celebrating Food as a Love Language with Antoni in the Kitchen"
2020	Martha Knows Best	Himself	Episode: "Vegetable Garden"
2022	Queen	Antoine	2 episodes
2022	Easy Bake Battle: The Home Cooking Competition	Himself	Host
2025	No Taste Like Home with Antoni Porowski	Himself	Host
2026	Best of the World	Himself	Host

=== Music videos ===
Year	Song	Artist
2018	"This Is Me (The Reimagined Remix)"	Keala Settle, Kesha, & Missy Elliott
2019	"You Need to Calm Down"	Taylor Swift

== Awards and nominations ==
Year	Award	Category	Work	Result	Ref.
2016	Documentaries Without Borders International Film Festival	Best Lead Actor	To My Father	Won	
2018	People's Choice Awards	Reality TV Star of the Year	Queer Eye	Nominated	
2019	People's Choice Awards	Reality TV Star of the Year	Queer Eye	Nominated	
2020	People's Choice Awards	Reality TV Star of the Year	Queer Eye	Nominated	
2020	Primetime Emmy Award	Outstanding Host for a Reality or Reality Competition Program	Queer Eye	Nominated	
2021	Primetime Emmy Award	Outstanding Host for a Reality or Reality Competition Program	Queer Eye	Nominated	
2022	Primetime Emmy Award	Outstanding Host for a Reality or Reality Competition Program	Queer Eye	Nominated	
2023	Primetime Emmy Award	Outstanding Host for a Reality or Reality Competition Program	Queer Eye	Nominated	
2023	Primetime Emmy Award	Outstanding Structured Reality Program	Queer Eye	Won	
2024	Primetime Emmy Award	Outstanding Structured Reality Program	Queer Eye	Nominated	
2025	Primetime Emmy Award	Outstanding Structured Reality Program	Queer Eye	Won	

== See also ==
- LGBTQ culture in New York City
- List of LGBTQ people from New York City
