= Bobby Berk =

American interior designer, TV personality

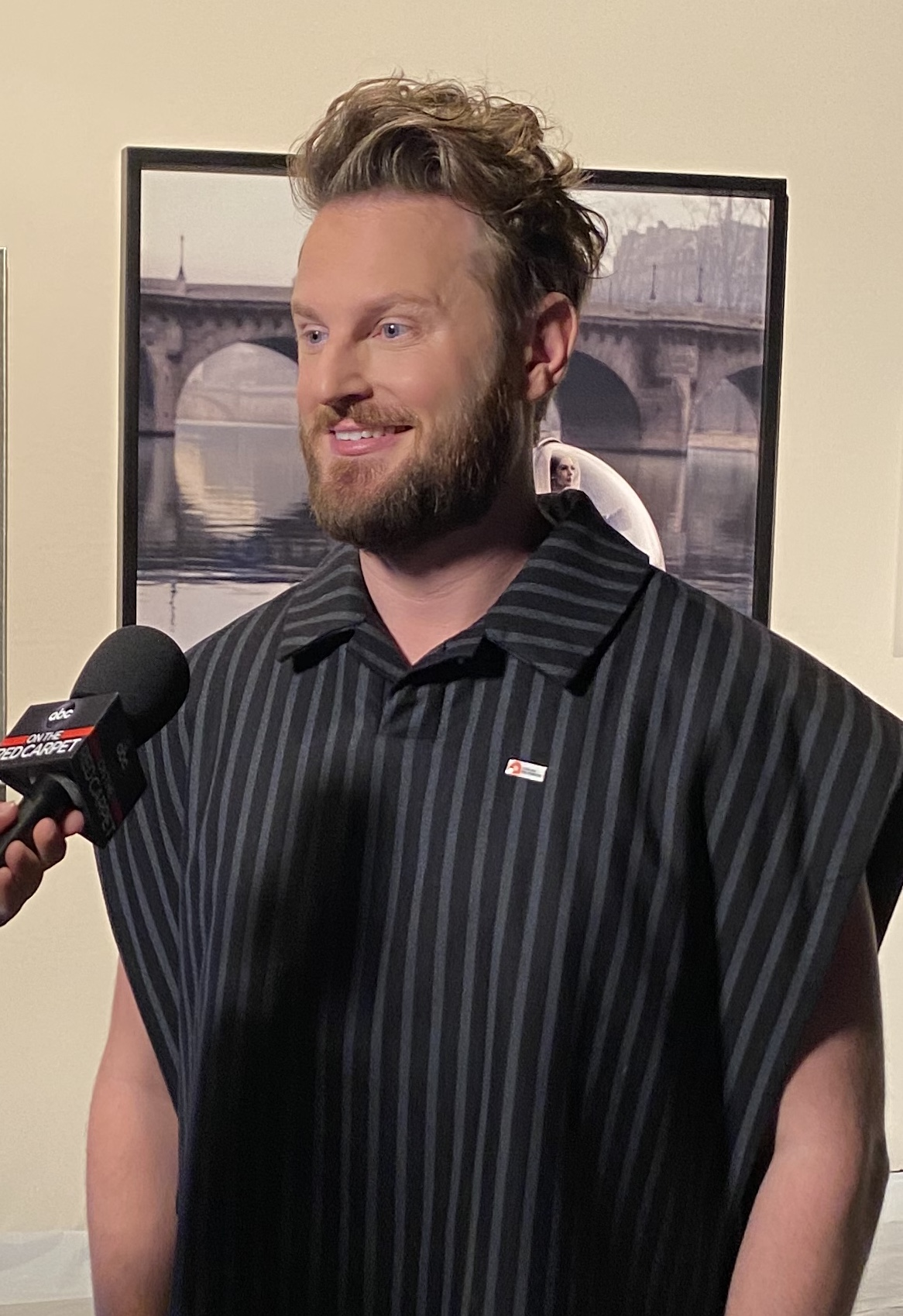
- Berk in 2020
- Born: Houston, Texas, U.S.
- Occupations: Interior designer; product designer; television personality; author
- Television: Queer Eye
- Spouse: Dewey Do (m. 2012)
- Website: bobbyberk.com

Bobby Berk is an American interior designer, television personality, and writer. The recipient of one Primetime Emmy Award, and four nominations, he starred in the Netflix series Queer Eye as the interior design expert for its first eight seasons.

== Early life ==
Berk was born in Houston, Texas to a young mother and then adopted by his maternal aunt and her husband, Connie and Jerry Berk. He grew up in Mount Vernon, Missouri in the middle of Amish farm country. Berk cites that being gay in the Bible Belt and attending an Assemblies of God church throughout his childhood was difficult, and that he faced both internal and external homophobia growing up.

Berk left home at the age of fifteen. He landed in Springfield, Missouri, and got a job at Applebee's in Branson, sleeping in his car or staying with friends. He drove home for school as a sophomore and attended Kickapoo High School for junior year. He then worked as a telemarketer for MCI Communications. It was through this job that he first met his biological father. Just before he turned eighteen, he moved to Denver, Colorado, where he got a gig at the Bombay Company.

== Career ==
Berk relocated to New York City in 2003. He found employment at Restoration Hardware and Bed Bath & Beyond before moving on to Portico, a high-end home furnishing company. With no high school diploma or formal training he worked his way up to creative director.

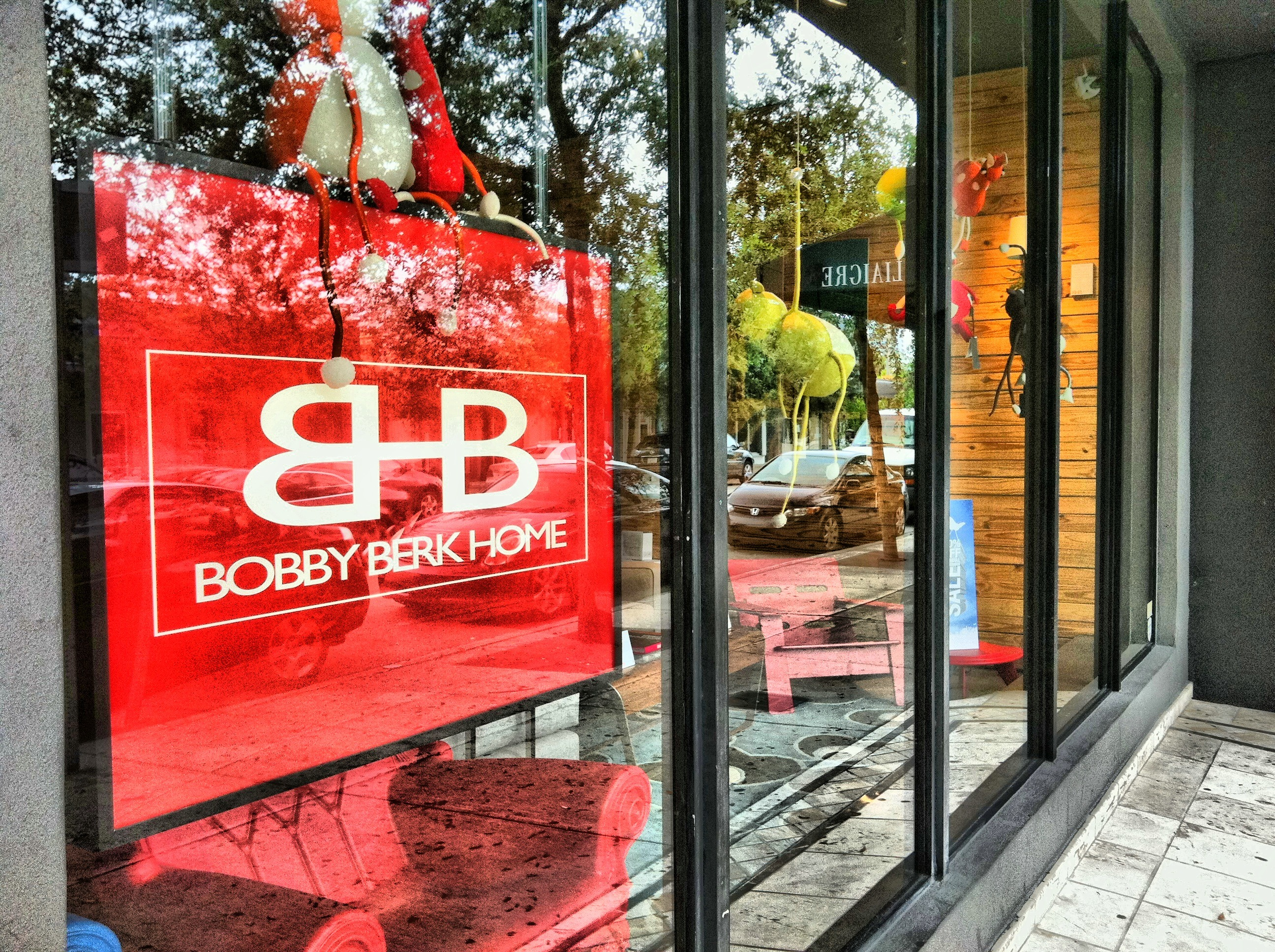
Bobby Berk Home (2011)

After Portico folded, Berk launched his online store, Bobby Berk Home, in 2006, opening his first store in SoHo, Manhattan a year later. Midtown Miami, Florida followed in 2010 as well as Midtown Atlanta, Georgia. He later launched Bobby Berk Interiors + Design, specializing in interior design services, whose headquarters is in Downtown Los Angeles. He appeared on television networks such as HGTV, NBC, CBS, and Bravo. Through his businesses, Berk has his own line of wallpaper, furniture, and art.

In 2018, Berk began starring as the interior design expert on the Netflix reality series Queer Eye. During his time on Queer Eye, he appeared alongside his castmates in Taylor Swift's "You Need to Calm Down" music video. Berk announced in 2023 that he would be departing the series after its eighth season, which aired in January 2024. He elaborated on his decision when the season released, explaining that he had already planned his next projects and thus chose not to re-sign his contract upon Netflix's decision to renew Queer Eye a year after their original contracts ended in 2022.

In 2021, Berk competed in season six of The Masked Singer as the wild card contestant "Caterpillar". He was eliminated alongside Willie Robertson as "Mallard" in the Group B semi-finals.

In 2022, Bobby was awarded an honorary degree of Doctor of Fine Arts from Otis College of Art and Design.

In July 2025, HGTV announced that Berk is set to star on his own TV series Junk or Jackpot? that is scheduled to premiere in late 2025.

== Personal life ==
Berk and his husband Dewey Do, a maxillofacial surgeon, met online in 2004 and married in 2012 "as soon as it was legal to get married". In July 2018, the couple moved to Los Angeles, California after living in New York City for over a decade. In 2023, they began living part-time in Portugal with their dog Bimini, whom they adopted in 2021. Berk disclosed being on the Autism spectrum in an episode of Nicole Byer's podcast Why Won't You Date Me?

Berk endorsed Elizabeth Warren in the 2020 Democratic Party presidential primaries.

On June 23, 2020, Berk and Queer Eye co-star Jonathan Van Ness praised recent U.S. Supreme Court decisions which ruled that LGBT employment discrimination was a violation of the Civil Rights Act of 1964. However, both of them still urged the United States Congress to pass the proposed Equality Act, which Berk claimed would amend the Civil Rights Act so it "would really extend healthcare and housing rights."

== Filmography ==
Year	Title	Role	Notes
2018–2024	Queer Eye	Himself	Main (Seasons 1–8), 58 episodes
2018	Nailed It!	Himself	Episode: "3, 2, 1...Ya Not Done!!"
2019	Lip Sync Battle	Himself	Season 5, Episode 1
2019	Big Mouth	Himself	Season 3
2019	Alexa & Katie	Annoyed Mini Golf Customer	Part 3, Episode 8
2020	Miss Americana	Himself	
2021	The Masked Singer	Himself/Caterpillar	Season 6 contestant
2021	Blown Away	Himself	Guest judge, Host
2023	Hell's Kitchen	Himself	Chef's Table guest diner for the Red Team; Episode: "Citizens of Hell's Kitchen"
2025	Junk or Jackpot?	Himself	Season 1

=== Music videos ===
Year	Song	Artist
2018	"This Is Me (The Reimagined Remix)"	Keala Settle, Kesha, & Missy Elliott
2019	"You Need to Calm Down"	Taylor Swift

== Awards and nominations ==
Year	Award	Category	Work	Result	Ref.
2020	Primetime Emmy Award	Outstanding Host for a Reality or Reality Competition Program	Queer Eye	Nominated	
2021	Primetime Emmy Award	Outstanding Host for a Reality or Reality Competition Program	Queer Eye	Nominated	
2022	Primetime Emmy Award	Outstanding Host for a Reality or Reality Competition Program	Queer Eye	Nominated	
2023	Primetime Emmy Award	Outstanding Host for a Reality or Reality Competition Program	Queer Eye	Nominated	
2023	Primetime Emmy Award	Outstanding Structured Reality Program	Queer Eye	Won	
2024	Primetime Emmy Award	Outstanding Structured Reality Program	Queer Eye	Nominated	
