= Jonathan Van Ness =

American hairstylist and TV personality (born 1987)

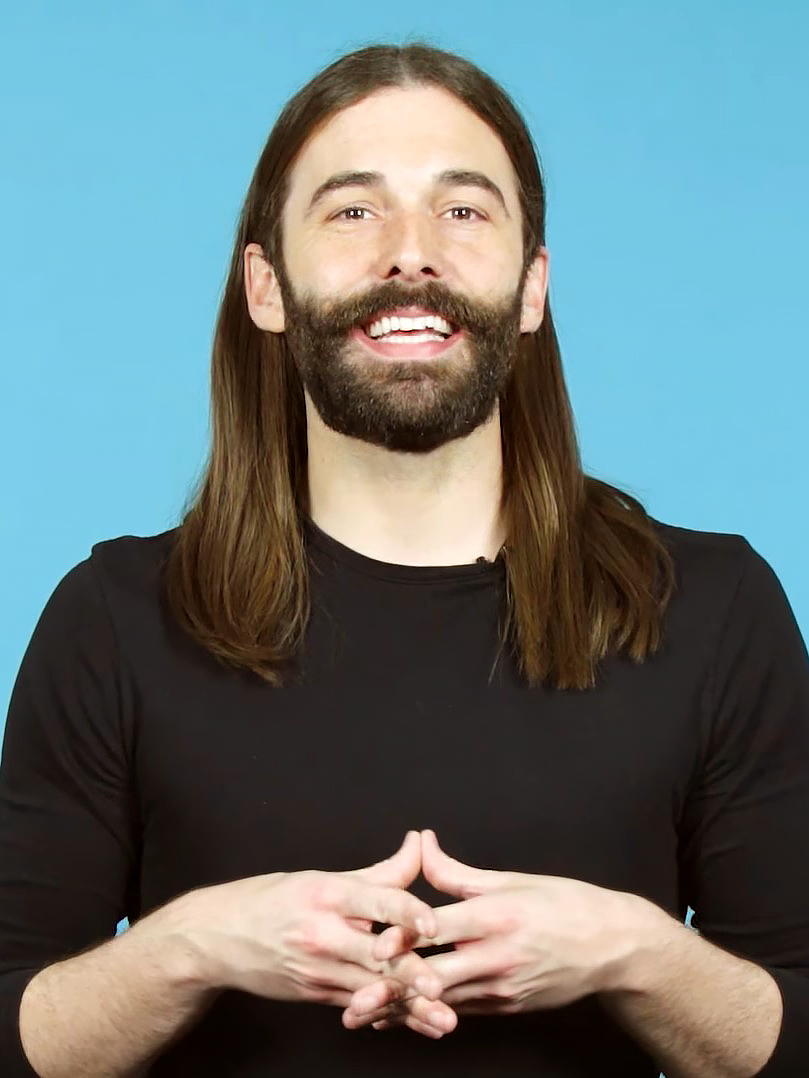
- Van Ness in April 2018
- Born: Jonathan McDonald Van Ness; March 28, 1987 (age 39); Quincy, Illinois, U.S.
- Education: University of Arizona (dropped out)
- Occupations: TV personality; podcast host; hairdresser; author; comedian
- Years active: 2013–present
- Television: Queer Eye
- Political party: Democratic
- Spouse: Mark Peacock (m. 2020)

Jonathan McDonald Van Ness (born March 28, 1987), also commonly referred to by his (Note: Van Ness uses he/him, she/her, and they/them pronouns but has stated that he prefers he/him. This article uses he/him for consistency.) initials J.V.N., is an American hairstylist, podcast host, author, and television personality best known as the grooming expert on the Netflix series Queer Eye, for his work on the web series parody Gay of Thrones, and for hosting the Getting Curious with Jonathan Van Ness podcast. He is also known for comedy tours, the 2023 tour entitled Fun & Slutty with Jonathan Van Ness.

== Early life ==
Jonathan Van Ness was born March 28, 1987, to parents Mary Winters and Jonathan Lyle Van Ness, and raised in Quincy, Illinois. He said he comes "from a family of journalists", being the sixth generation of his family-owned newspaper. This refers to broadcast and newspaper conglomerate Quincy Media and the company's local flagship newspaper, the Herald-Whig; Van Ness's mother is the vice president of Quincy Media, and he is a descendant of the Oakley family, which has controlled the company since the 1890s. Van Ness's 9th great-grandmother, Patience Bacon Miller, was one of the founders of Northampton, Massachusetts, and was the first female surgeon in America.

When Van Ness was younger, he was sexually abused by an older boy at church, which laid the foundation for self-destructive behaviors. In his early teens, he used online chat to socialize with older men, and sometimes meet with them for sex.

Openly gay throughout his life, Van Ness experienced bullying for his femininity and natural flamboyance. He "endured years of judgment, ridicule, and trauma". Of the time, Van Ness said, "Growing up I definitely put on every nail polish, every heel, every scarf – I definitely had my mom's knockoff Hermès scarves in my hair and around my waist – those were my skirts, and I loved it. ... But when I was really young, I had really femme-shamey, gender-shamey [reactions] when I would dress like that. When I would play with those things, I knew it needed to be ... behind closed doors." Although always comfortable in his gender expression and sexuality, he says it took time to navigate other people's reactions. In response to the bullying, he used humor as a coping mechanism and relied on a small group of close friends for support. Years later, in the late 2010s, he realized he was gender non-conforming and came out as non-binary. He uses they/them, he/him, and she/her pronouns.

Van Ness was the first male cheerleader at Quincy Senior High School and continued cheerleading in college at the University of Arizona, where he majored in political science. One month in his initial semester at college, he used his monthly allowance on cocaine and, too embarrassed to ask his parents for funds, turned to sex work. His addictions to sex and drugs increased to also include methamphetamine. His grades fell, and he lost his cheerleading scholarship; he dropped out after one semester to pursue hairstyling.

Van Ness trained at the Aveda Institute in Minneapolis. After graduating, he worked in Arizona for five years, before moving to Los Angeles in 2009.

== Career ==
In Los Angeles, Van Ness found a job as a personal assistant at Sally Hershberger Salon. One day in 2012, at age 25, he fainted in the salon while doing highlights for a client's hair. Later at a clinic, he found out he was HIV-positive. He used the revelation to get clean from drug use and publicly shared his story, saying, "I want people to realize you're never too broken to be fixed."

He worked at MoJoHair and Stile Salon, both in Los Angeles, which he co-founded with Monique Northrop of Arte Salon in New York City.

=== Media ===
In 2013, while dressing the hair of friend Erin Gibson, who worked for the comedy syndicate Funny or Die, Gibson asked Van Ness to perform his recap of a Game of Thrones episode for Funny or Die, which became the Gay of Thrones web series. In 2018, Van Ness was nominated for a Primetime Emmy Award for Outstanding Short Form Variety Series for the series.

Since 2015, Van Ness has hosted the weekly podcast Getting Curious with Jonathan Van Ness. His podcast took off upon the airing of the first Queer Eye episode.

Beginning in 2018, Van Ness has starred as the grooming expert on the Netflix revival of Queer Eye.

=== Books ===
Van Ness's memoir, Over the Top: A Raw Journey to Self-Love, was published in October 2019. His memoir discusses his past and how it helped sculpt his future.

In 2020, Van Ness released a picture book titled Peanut Goes for the Gold, which tells the story of a nonbinary guinea pig named Peanut and their adventures as a rhythmic gymnastics prodigy. Peanut is inspired by Van Ness's own childhood pet.

In 2022, Van Ness released a collection of essays in a book titled Love That Story: Observations from a Gorgeously Queer Life.

== Personal life ==
Van Ness is non-binary. Although he has stated a preference for using the pronouns he/him, he has also used she/her and they/them interchangeably. He explained his gender in an interview with Out, saying, "Some days I feel like a man, but then other days I feel like a woman. I don't really — I think my energies are really all over the place. Any opportunity I have to break down stereotypes of the binary, I am down for it, I'm here for it." However, on his Instagram account, the pronouns displayed by order of preferences are they/he/she.

Van Ness lives and works in Austin, Texas and New York City. He has psoriasis, a chronic skin condition, and advises clients on skin care. In 2019, he revealed that he is HIV positive.

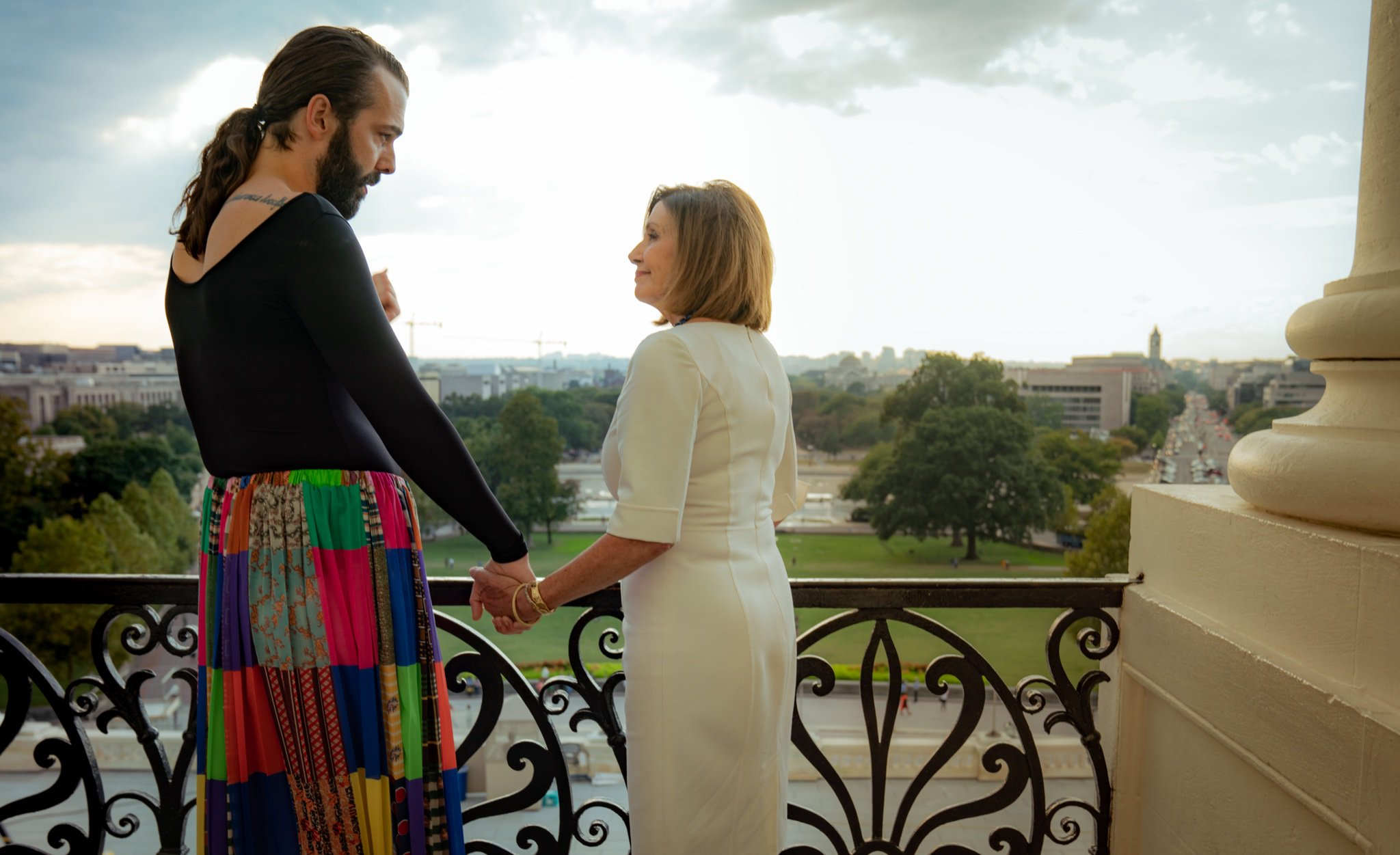
Pelosi and Van Ness at the Speaker's Balcony

On April 4, 2019, Van Ness, Bobby Berk, Tan France, and Antoni Porowski visited Nancy Pelosi and Alexandria Ocasio-Cortez to discuss the Equality Act, a bill that would add sexual orientation and gender identity to the list of classes protected in the Civil Rights Act of 1964. On September 25, Van Ness announced his endorsement of Elizabeth Warren for president in 2020 based upon healthcare being a human right.

On June 23, 2020, Van Ness and Queer Eye costar Bobby Berk praised recent U.S. Supreme Court decisions that ruled that LGBT employment discrimination was a violation of the Civil Rights Act of 1964. Van Ness described the ruling as "a great step in the right direction". However, both of them still urged the United States Congress to pass the proposed Equality Act, which passed the House but ultimately stalled in the Senate following a filibuster.

In December 2020, Van Ness revealed that he had married his partner, Mark Peacock, earlier that year.

== Bibliography ==
- Over the Top: A Raw Journey to Self-Love (2019)
- Peanut Goes for the Gold (2020)
- Love That Story: Observations from a Gorgeously Queer Life (2022)

== Filmography ==
=== Television and web ===
Year	Title	Role	Notes
2013–2019	Gay of Thrones	Jonathan	Series regular, 45 episodes
2014	I Love the 2000s	Himself	Series regular, 10 episodes
2018–present	Queer Eye	Himself	Series regular, 58 episodes
2018	Nailed It!	Himself	Contestant, Episode: "3, 2, 1... Ya Not Done!!"
2019	Big Mouth	Himself (voice)	Episode: "Disclosure the Movie: The Musical!"
2019	Big City Greens	Confident Stylist (voice)	Episode: "Cricket's Kapowie"
2020	Sarah Cooper: Everything's Fine	Arianne Zucker	Television special
2020	Spinning Out	Himself	Episode 3, Cameo
2021	M.O.D.O.K.	Himself (voice)	Episode: "This Man... This Makeover!"
2021	I Heart Arlo	Furlecia	Main voice role
2022	Getting Curious with Jonathan Van Ness	Himself	6 Episodes
2024	Rock Paper Scissors	Unconditionally Supportive Wig (voice)	Episode: "The Family Business"

=== Films ===
Year	Title	Role	Notes
2020	Miss Americana	Himself	Directed by Lana Wilson
2021	Arlo the Alligator Boy	Furlecia	Main voice role; directed by Ryan Crego

=== Music videos ===
Year	Song	Artist(s)
2018	"This Is Me (The Reimagined Remix)"	Keala Settle, Kesha, & Missy Elliott
2019	"You Need to Calm Down"	Taylor Swift
2020	"Malibu" (At Home Edition)	Kim Petras

== Awards and nominations ==
Year	Award	Category	Work	Result	Ref.
2018	Primetime Emmy Award	Outstanding Short Form Variety Series	Gay of Thrones	Nominated	
2019	Primetime Emmy Award	Outstanding Short Form Variety Series	Gay of Thrones	Nominated	
2019	Critics Choice Award	Male Star of the Year	Himself	Won	
2019	Goodreads Choice Award	Best Memoir and Autobiography	Over the Top: A Raw Journey to Self-Love	Won	
2019	iHeartRadio Podcast Award	Best LGBTQ Podcast	Getting Curious with Jonathan Van Ness	Won	
2019	Shorty Award	Favorite Reality TV Star	Queer Eye	Nominated	
2019	People's Choice Awards	Reality TV Star of the Year	Queer Eye	Nominated	
2020	People's Choice Awards	Reality TV Star of the Year	Queer Eye	Nominated	
2020	Shorty Award	Favorite Reality TV Star	Queer Eye	Nominated	
2020	Queerty Award	Badass	Himself	Nominated	
2020	iHeartRadio Podcast Award	Best Overall Host - Male	Queer Eye	Nominated	
2020	Primetime Emmy Award	Outstanding Host for a Reality or Reality Competition Program	Queer Eye	Nominated	
2021	Primetime Emmy Award	Outstanding Host for a Reality or Reality Competition Program	Queer Eye	Nominated	
2021	iHeartRadio Podcast Award	Best Overall Host - Male	Queer Eye	Nominated	
2022	Queerty Award	Best Podcast	Getting Curious with Jonathan Van Ness	Nominated	
2022	Primetime Emmy Award	Outstanding Host for a Reality or Reality Competition Program	Queer Eye	Nominated	
2023	Primetime Emmy Award	Outstanding Host for a Reality or Reality Competition Program	Queer Eye	Nominated	
2023	Primetime Emmy Award	Outstanding Structured Reality Program	Queer Eye	Won	
2024	Primetime Emmy Award	Outstanding Structured Reality Program	Queer Eye	Nominated	
2025	Primetime Emmy Award	Outstanding Structured Reality Program	Queer Eye	Won	

== See also ==
- LGBTQ culture in New York City
- List of LGBTQ people from New York City
