= List of Netflix original programming =

Netflix is an American global streaming-on-demand media provider that since 2007 has distributed many original streaming television shows, including original series, specials, miniseries, documentaries and films. Netflix's original productions also include continuations of canceled series from other networks, as well as licensing or co-producing content from international broadcasters for exclusive broadcast in other territories, which are also branded in those regions as Netflix original content. Netflix previously produced content through Red Envelope Entertainment. The company has since increased its original content. All programming is in English unless stated otherwise, is organized by its primary genre or format, and is sorted by premiere date. These shows had their original production commissioned by Netflix, or had additional seasons commissioned by Netflix.

== Drama ==
| Title | Genre | Premiere | Seasons | Runtime | Status |
|---|---|---|---|---|---|
| Virgin River | Romantic drama | December 6, 2019 | 7 seasons, 74 episodes | 39–54 min | Renewed for seasons 8–9 |
| The Witcher | Fantasy drama | December 20, 2019 | 4 seasons, 32 episodes | 47–67 min | Renewed for final season |
| Bridgerton | Alternate historical romance | December 25, 2020 | 4 seasons, 32 episodes | 52–73 min | Renewed for seasons 5–6 |
| Ginny & Georgia | Coming-of-age drama | February 24, 2021 | 3 seasons, 30 episodes | 52–68 min | Season 4 due to premiere on January 21, 2027 |
| The Lincoln Lawyer | Legal thriller | May 13, 2022 | 4 seasons, 40 episodes | 43–57 min | Renewed for final season |
| The Watcher | Horror | October 13, 2022 | 1 season, 7 episodes | 44–52 min | Renewed |
| The Night Agent | Political thriller | March 23, 2023 | 3 seasons, 30 episodes | 45–56 min | Final season due to premiere in 2027 |
| The Diplomat | Political thriller | April 20, 2023 | 4 seasons, 30 episodes | 41–60 min | Renewed |
| Fatal Seduction | Thriller | July 7, 2023 | 3 seasons, 35 episodes | 26–35 min | Pending |
| My Life with the Walter Boys | Romantic drama | December 7, 2023 | 3 seasons, 30 episodes | 38–56 min | Renewed |
| 3 Body Problem | Science fiction | March 21, 2024 | 1 season, 8 episodes | 44–63 min | Season 2 due to premiere on January 14, 2027; Renewed |
| Supacell | Superhero drama | June 27, 2024 | 1 season, 6 episodes | 46–59 min | Renewed |
| Beauty in Black | Drama | October 24, 2024 | 3 seasons, 40 episodes | 42–57 min | Renewed |
| Black Doves | Thriller | December 5, 2024 | 2 seasons, 12 episodes | 46–57 min | Pending |
| Forever | Teen drama | May 8, 2025 | 1 season, 8 episodes | 43–52 min | Renewed |
| Bet | Thriller | May 15, 2025 | 1 season, 10 episodes | 30–38 min | Renewed |
| Dept. Q | Crime thriller | May 29, 2025 | 1 season, 9 episodes | 42–71 min | Renewed |
| Untamed | Crime drama | July 17, 2025 | 1 season, 6 episodes | 42–51 min | Renewed |
| House of Guinness | Historical drama | September 25, 2025 | 1 season, 8 episodes | 44–55 min | Renewed |
| The Beast in Me | Crime thriller | November 13, 2025 | 1 season, 8 episodes | 41–54 min | Renewed |
| Agatha Christie's Seven Dials | Mystery drama | January 15, 2026 | 1 season, 3 episodes | 52–56 min | Pending |
| Finding Her Edge | Sports teen drama | January 22, 2026 | 1 season, 8 episodes | 40–49 min | Renewed |
| Unchosen | Psychological thriller | April 21, 2026 | 1 season, 6 episodes | 40–49 min | Pending |
| Man on Fire | Action thriller | April 30, 2026 | 1 season, 7 episodes | 42–59 min | Pending |
| Legends | Crime drama | May 7, 2026 | 1 season, 6 episodes | 48–74 min | Renewed |
| Nemesis | Action heist | May 14, 2026 | 1 season, 8 episodes | 56–63 min | Renewed |
| My Brilliant Career | Period drama | August 13, 2026 | 1 season, 6 episodes | 39–48 min | Pending |
| Crew Girl | Sports teen drama | September 10, 2026 | 1 season, 8 episodes | 40–55 min | Renewed |
| The Body | Coming of age psychological drama horror | November 11, 2026 | 1 season, 8 episodes | 46–60 min | Pending |
Awaiting release
| Trinity | Political thriller | December 1, 2026 | 1 season, 8 episodes | TBA | Pending |
| Pride and Prejudice | Period drama | December 3, 2026 | 6 episodes | TBA | Miniseries |
| The Murder of JonBenét Ramsey | True crime drama | December 10, 2026 | 8 episodes | TBA | Miniseries |
| Sunshine Girls | Teen drama | December 15, 2026 | TBA | TBA | Pending |
| Unaccustomed Earth | Drama | December 17, 2026 | 1 season, 8 episodes | TBA | Pending |
| The Twin | Crime drama | January 1, 2027 | 6 episodes | TBA | Miniseries |
| The Age of Innocence | Period drama | February 17, 2027 | 8 episodes | TBA | Miniseries |

== Comedy ==
| Title | Genre | Premiere | Seasons | Runtime | Status |
|---|---|---|---|---|---|
| Emily in Paris | Comedy drama | October 2, 2020 | 5 seasons, 50 episodes | 24–46 min | Final season due to premiere on December 24, 2026 |
| Wednesday | Comedy horror | November 23, 2022 | 2 seasons, 16 episodes | 47–69 min | Renewed |
| Beef | Comedy drama anthology | April 6, 2023 | 2 seasons, 18 episodes | 30–54 min | Pending |
| XO, Kitty | Romantic comedy drama | May 18, 2023 | 3 seasons, 26 episodes | 24–35 min | Pending |
| The Gentlemen | Action comedy | March 7, 2024 | 2 seasons, 16 episodes | 41–67 min | Renewed |
| Tires | Workplace comedy | May 23, 2024 | 3 seasons, 30 episodes | 18–31 min | Renewed |
| Nobody Wants This | Romantic comedy | September 26, 2024 | 3 seasons, 30 episodes | 21–31 min | Renewed |
| A Man on the Inside | Crime comedy | November 21, 2024 | 2 seasons, 16 episodes | 27–38 min | Renewed for final season |
| Running Point | Sports comedy | February 27, 2025 | 2 seasons, 20 episodes | 25–34 min | Renewed |
| The Four Seasons | Romantic comedy | May 1, 2025 | 2 seasons, 16 episodes | 27–35 min | Renewed |
| Bad Thoughts | Dark comedy | May 13, 2025 | 2 seasons, 12 episodes | 17–22 min | Pending |
| Leanne | Sitcom | July 31, 2025 | 2 seasons, 26 episodes | 18–24 min | Pending |
| Man vs. Baby | Comedy | December 11, 2025 | 1 season, 4 episodes | 24–37 min | Pending |
| Free Bert | Comedy | January 22, 2026 | 1 season, 6 episodes | 23–30 min | Renewed |
| Big Mistakes | Crime comedy | April 9, 2026 | 1 season, 8 episodes | 31–37 min | Renewed |
| The Hawk | Sports comedy | July 16, 2026 | 1 season, 10 episodes | 28–37 min | Pending |
| A Different World | Comedy | September 24, 2026 | 1 season, 10 episodes | 30–36 min | Renewed |
| Minimum Wage | Workplace comedy | October 26, 2026 | 1 season, 14 episodes | 12–20 min | Pending |
| How to Ruin Diwali: Meet the Parents | Romantic comedy | October 30, 2026 | 1 season, 3 episodes | 39–44 min | Pending |
Awaiting release
| Collect & Praise | Comedy | December 1, 2026 | TBA | TBA | Pending |

== Kids & family ==
| Title | Genre | Premiere | Seasons | Runtime | Status |
|---|---|---|---|---|---|
| One Piece | Action-adventure | August 31, 2023 | 2 seasons, 16 episodes | 49–66 min | Season 3 due to premiere in 2027 |
| Avatar: The Last Airbender | Fantasy | February 22, 2024 | 2 seasons, 15 episodes | 47–69 min | Renewed for final season |
| Geek Girl | Teen drama | May 30, 2024 | 1 season, 10 episodes | 28–37 min | Renewed |
| Little House on the Prairie | Western historical drama | July 9, 2026 | 1 season, 8 episodes | 42–57 min | Renewed |
| Hollywood Arts | Teen sitcom | October 15, 2026 | 1 season, 12 episodes | 23–53 min | Pending |

== Animation ==
=== Adult animation ===
| Title | Genre | Premiere | Seasons | Runtime | Language | Status |
|---|---|---|---|---|---|---|
| Blue Eye Samurai | Period action | November 3, 2023 | 1 season, 8 episodes | 35–62 min | English | Season 2 due to premiere on January 19, 2027; Renewed for final season |
| Devil May Cry | Dark fantasy action | April 3, 2025 | 2 seasons, 16 episodes | 21–39 min | English | Renewed for final season |
| Long Story Short | Comedy | August 22, 2025 | 1 season, 10 episodes | 25 min | English | Season 2 due to premiere in 2026 |
| Haunted Hotel | Horror comedy | September 19, 2025 | 2 seasons, 18 episodes | 24–26 min | English | Season 3 due to premiere in 2027 |
| Mating Season | Romantic comedy | May 22, 2026 | 1 season, 10 episodes | 26–27 min | English | Pending |
| Alley Cats | Dark comedy | August 7, 2026 | 1 season, 6 episodes | 15–17 min | English | Pending |
| Dang! | Comedy | September 8, 2026 | 1 season, 8 episodes | 25–27 min | English | Pending |
| Bass X Machina | Steampunk Western | November 3, 2026 | 1 season, 6 episodes | 29–40 min | English | Pending |
Awaiting release
| Living the Dream | Workplace comedy | December 18, 2026 | 1 season, 8 episodes | 25 min | English | Pending |

=== Anime ===
| Title | Genre | Premiere | Seasons | Runtime | Language | Status |
|---|---|---|---|---|---|---|
| Record of Ragnarok | Action fantasy | June 17, 2021 | 3 seasons, 42 episodes | 23–26 min | Japanese | Renewed |
| Cyberpunk: Edgerunners | Cyberpunk anthology | September 13, 2022 | 2 seasons, 20 episodes | 23–30 min | Japanese | Pending |
| Splinter Cell: Deathwatch | Spy action | October 14, 2025 | 1 season, 8 episodes | 20–27 min | English | Renewed |
| Love Through a Prism | Historical romance | January 15, 2026 | 1 season, 20 episodes | 22–40 min | Japanese | Pending |
| Baki-Dou: The Invincible Samurai | Martial arts | February 26, 2026 | 1 season, 25 episodes | 22–26 min | Japanese | Pending |
| Dandelion | Supernatural comedy | April 16, 2026 | 1 season, 7 episodes | 23–38 min | Japanese | Pending |
Awaiting release
| Fool Night | Post-apocalyptic science fiction thriller | November 26, 2026 | TBA | TBA | Japanese | Pending |

=== Kids & family ===
| Title | Genre | Premiere | Seasons | Runtime | Language | Status |
|---|---|---|---|---|---|---|
| Trash Truck | Preschool | November 10, 2020 | 2 seasons, 28 episodes | 10–17 min | English | Renewed |
| Gabby's Dollhouse | Preschool adventure fantasy | January 5, 2021 | 14 seasons, 90 episodes | 23–30 min | English | Renewed through episode 100 |
| The Creature Cases | Preschool action comedy | April 12, 2022 | 7 chapters, 59 episodes | 16–29 min | English | Renewed |
| Cocomelon Lane | Preschool musical | November 17, 2023 | 7 seasons, 28 episodes | 17–34 min | English | Season 8 due to premiere on December 14, 2026 |
| Bad Dinosaurs | Preschool comedy | March 28, 2024 | 1 season, 8 episodes | 20–22 min | English | Renewed for seasons 2–3 |
| Dr. Seuss's Red Fish, Blue Fish | Preschool | September 8, 2025 | 3 seasons, 15 episodes | 23–31 min | English | Pending |
| Dr. Seuss's Horton! | Preschool | October 6, 2025 | 2 seasons, 13 episodes | 23–25 min | English | Pending |
| The Bad Guys: The Series | Heist comedy | November 6, 2025 | 2 seasons, 19 episodes | 24–25 min | English | Pending |
| Unicorn Academy: Secrets Revealed | Fantasy action-adventure | March 19, 2026 | 2 seasons, 14 episodes | 25–26 min | English | Pending |
| Stranger Things: Tales from '85 | Science fiction horror | April 23, 2026 | 2 seasons, 18 episodes | 25–32 min | English | Pending |
| Lego One Piece | Fantasy action-adventure | September 29, 2026 | 1 season, 2 episodes | 32–33 min | English | Pending |
| Doozie's Doghouse | Preschool adventure fantasy | November 9, 2026 | 1 season, 7 episodes | 25 min | English | Pending |

== Non-English language scripted ==
These shows are created by Netflix and are spoken entirely or almost entirely in a non-English language. Most have the option of watching with English subtitles and dub.

=== Dutch ===
| Title | Genre | Premiere | Seasons | Runtime | Status |
|---|---|---|---|---|---|
| Roosters | Comedy | February 28, 2025 | 2 seasons, 14 episodes | 29–35 min | Renewed for final season |
| Football Parents | Comedy | May 16, 2025 | 1 season, 6 episodes | 27–32 min | Renewed |
| The Perfect Lie | Crime thriller | September 10, 2026 | 1 season, 7 episodes | 47–62 min | Pending |
Awaiting release
| Toos: The Van der Valk Kidnapping | True crime drama | November 26, 2026 | TBA | TBA | Miniseries |

=== French ===
| Title | Genre | Premiere | Seasons | Runtime | Status |
|---|---|---|---|---|---|
| Lupin | Crime drama | January 8, 2021 | 4 parts, 25 episodes | 39–56 min | Pending |
| Blood Coast | Crime drama | December 6, 2023 | 2 seasons, 12 episodes | 44–57 min | Renewed |
| Furies | Action | March 1, 2024 | 2 seasons, 14 episodes | 39–52 min | Pending |
| The Cage | Sports drama | November 8, 2024 | 1 season, 5 episodes | 42–65 min | Season 2 due to premiere on December 16, 2026 |
| Cash Queens | Crime thriller | February 5, 2026 | 1 season, 8 episodes | 35–55 min | Pending |
| Bandi | Crime thriller | April 9, 2026 | 1 season, 8 episodes | 51–63 min | Pending |
| Flunked | Comedy | April 23, 2026 | 1 season, 8 episodes | 26–35 min | Pending |
| Elite Force | Crime thriller | July 22, 2026 | 1 season, 6 episodes | 42–55 min | Pending |

=== German ===
| Title | Genre | Premiere | Seasons | Runtime | Status |
|---|---|---|---|---|---|
| Crooks | Crime drama | April 4, 2024 | 2 seasons, 14 episodes | 39–66 min | Pending |
| Murder Mindfully | Dark comedy | October 31, 2024 | 2 seasons, 16 episodes | 28–38 min | Renewed |
| Dudes | Comedy | October 2, 2025 | 1 season, 8 episodes | 33–38 min | Renewed |
| Unfamiliar | Crime drama | February 5, 2026 | 1 season, 6 episodes | 49–58 min | Pending |
| Crap Happens | Comedy | February 26, 2026 | 1 season, 9 episodes | 33–37 min | Pending |

=== Hindi ===
| Title | Genre | Premiere | Seasons | Runtime | Status |
|---|---|---|---|---|---|
| Mismatched | Romantic comedy | November 20, 2020 | 3 seasons, 22 episodes | 28–44 min | Final season due to premiere in 2026 |
| Yeh Kaali Kaali Ankhein | Romantic thriller | January 14, 2022 | 2 seasons, 14 episodes | 31–51 min | Renewed |
| Guns & Gulaabs | Crime comedy thriller | August 18, 2023 | 1 season, 7 episodes | 44–81 min | Renewed |
| Maamla Legal Hai | Legal comedy drama | March 1, 2024 | 2 seasons, 16 episodes | 27–42 min | Pending |
| Heeramandi: The Diamond Bazaar | Family drama | May 1, 2024 | 1 season, 8 episodes | 46–67 min | Renewed |
| Black Warrant | Crime drama | January 10, 2025 | 1 season, 7 episodes | 38–50 min | Renewed |
| The Royals | Romantic comedy | May 9, 2025 | 1 season, 8 episodes | 39–48 min | Renewed |
| Single Papa | Comedy | December 12, 2025 | 1 season, 6 episodes | 32–45 min | Pending |
| Taskaree: The Smuggler's Web | Crime drama | January 13, 2026 | 1 season, 7 episodes | 38–58 min | Pending |
| Hello Bachhon | Drama | March 6, 2026 | 1 season, 5 episodes | 44–55 min | Pending |
| Glory | Sports drama | May 1, 2026 | 1 season, 7 episodes | 47–60 min | Pending |
| Musafir Cafe | Drama | July 24, 2026 | 1 season, 8 episodes | 25–41 min | Renewed |
| Operation Safed Sagar: The Highest Air Force Mission | Military action drama | August 7, 2026 | 1 season, 6 episodes | 47–57 min | Pending |
| Chumbak | Comedy | September 10, 2026 | 1 season, 16 episodes | 23–32 min | Pending |
| Shaque: Trust No One | Mystery thriller | September 24, 2026 | 1 season, 7 episodes | 31–43 min | Pending |
| Akka: The Protectors | Drama | October 30, 2026 | 1 season, 5 episodes | 30–46 min | Pending |
Awaiting release
| O Saathi Re | Romance drama | December 4, 2026 | TBA | TBA | Pending |

=== Italian ===
| Title | Genre | Premiere | Seasons | Runtime | Status |
|---|---|---|---|---|---|
| My Family | Drama | February 19, 2025 | 2 seasons, 12 episodes | 37–51 min | Pending |
| Real Men | Comedy | May 21, 2025 | 2 seasons, 16 episodes | 27–37 min | Pending |
| The Monster of Florence | Crime drama | October 22, 2025 | 1 season, 4 episodes | 50–67 min | Renewed |
| Motorvalley | Sports drama | February 10, 2026 | 1 season, 6 episodes | 42–49 min | Pending |
| Minerva Academy | Teen drama | September 22, 2026 | 1 season, 8 episodes | 46–56 min | Pending |
| Chiaroscuro | Crime comedy | November 11, 2026 | 1 season, 8 episodes | 43–53 min | Pending |
Awaiting release
| The Good Boss | Comedy drama | December 2, 2026 | 1 season, 6 episodes | TBA | Pending |

=== Japanese ===
| Title | Genre | Premiere | Seasons | Runtime | Status |
|---|---|---|---|---|---|
| YuYu Hakusho | Fantasy action-adventure | December 14, 2023 | 1 season, 5 episodes | 44–55 min | Renewed |
| Tokyo Swindlers | Crime thriller | July 25, 2024 | 1 season, 7 episodes | 37–66 min | Renewed |
| Last Samurai Standing | Historical drama | November 13, 2025 | 1 season, 6 episodes | 47–58 min | Renewed |
| Sins of Kujo | Crime thriller/Legal drama | April 2, 2026 | 1 season, 10 episodes | 39–69 min | Pending |
| Straight to Hell | Biopic/Crime drama | April 27, 2026 | 1 season, 9 episodes | 46–65 min | Pending |
| Viral Hit | Action/Martial arts teen drama | June 11, 2026 | 1 season, 6 episodes | 41–59 min | Pending |
| Human Vapor | Science fiction crime thriller | July 2, 2026 | 1 season, 8 episodes | 41–68 min | Pending |
| S&X | Life drama | August 20, 2026 | 1 season, 7 episodes | 39–51 min | Pending |
| Plastic Beauty | Medical drama | September 17, 2026 | 1 season, 8 episodes | 59–78 min | Pending |
| Did Someone Happen to Mention Me? | Comedy | October 22, 2026 | 1 season, 8 episodes | 43–57 min | Pending |
Awaiting release
| Quiztopia | Dystopian mystery thriller | December 17, 2026 | 1 season, 8 episodes | TBA | Pending |

=== Korean ===
| Title | Genre | Premiere | Seasons | Runtime | Status |
|---|---|---|---|---|---|
| All of Us Are Dead | Zombie apocalypse horror thriller | January 28, 2022 | 1 season, 12 episodes | 53–71 min | Renewed |
| Bloodhounds | Action drama | June 9, 2023 | 2 seasons, 15 episodes | 49–75 min | Pending |
| The Trauma Code: Heroes on Call | Medical drama | January 24, 2025 | 1 season, 8 episodes | 47–55 min | Renewed for seasons 2–3 |
| The Price of Confession | Mystery thriller | December 5, 2025 | 1 season, 12 episodes | 46–60 min | Pending |
Awaiting release
| Tantara | Period drama | December 11, 2026 | 22 episodes | TBA | Pending |

=== Mandarin ===
| Title | Genre | Premiere | Seasons | Runtime | Status |
|---|---|---|---|---|---|
| Wave Makers | Political drama | April 28, 2023 | 1 season, 8 episodes | 44–55 min | Renewed |
| Had I Not Seen the Sun | Coming-of age romantic thriller | November 13, 2025 | 2 parts, 20 episodes | 50–69 min | Pending |
| Million-Follower Detective | Crime thriller | February 12, 2026 | 1 season, 8 episodes | 43–50 min | Pending |
| Agent from Above | Action fantasy | April 2, 2026 | 1 season, 8 episodes | 37–45 min | Pending |
| The Fixers | Action crime comedy | September 17, 2026 | 1 season, 10 episodes | 37–50 min | Pending |
| Miracles of the ER | Medical drama | November 12, 2026 | 1 season, 8 episodes | 43–53 min | Pending |

=== Norwegian ===
| Title | Genre | Premiere | Seasons | Runtime | Status |
|---|---|---|---|---|---|
| Home for Christmas | Comedy drama | December 5, 2019 | 3 seasons, 20 episodes | 25–36 min | Pending |
| Jo Nesbø's Detective Hole | Crime drama | March 26, 2026 | 1 season, 9 episodes | 43–62 min | Pending |
Awaiting release
| Always on Call | Medical drama | November 26, 2026 | 1 season, 7 episodes | TBA | Pending |

=== Polish ===
| Title | Genre | Premiere | Seasons | Runtime | Status |
|---|---|---|---|---|---|
| 1670 | Comedy | December 13, 2023 | 3 seasons, 24 episodes | 29–44 min | Renewed |
| Go Ahead, Brother | Crime drama | October 30, 2024 | 1 season, 6 episodes | 52–62 min | Renewed |
| The Mothers of Penguins | Comedy drama | November 13, 2024 | 2 seasons, 12 episodes | 43–62 min | Pending |
| Anaesthesia | Medical drama | November 4, 2026 | 1 season, 8 episodes | 45–53 min | Renewed |
| The Law of Beasts | Crime drama | November 18, 2026 | 1 season, 4 episodes | 42–60 min | Pending |
Awaiting release
| The Riot | Historical crime thriller | December 9, 2026 | 1 season, 6 episodes | TBA | Pending |

=== Portuguese ===
| Title | Genre | Premiere | Seasons | Runtime | Status |
|---|---|---|---|---|---|
| Criminal Code | Crime drama | November 14, 2023 | 2 seasons, 16 episodes | 47–63 min | Renewed |
| Rulers of Fortune | Crime drama | October 29, 2025 | 1 season, 8 episodes | 50–62 min | Renewed |
| Radioactive Emergency | Historical drama | March 18, 2026 | 1 season, 5 episodes | 53–65 min | Pending |
| Brazil 70: The Third Star | Historical sports drama | May 29, 2026 | 1 season, 5 episodes | 53–75 min | Pending |
| Wrath | Martial arts | July 29, 2026 | 1 season, 6 episodes | 43–54 min | Pending |
| Habeas Corpus | Legal drama | September 23, 2026 | 1 season, 8 episodes | 57–77 min | Pending |
| The Gift of Deceit | Drama | October 28, 2026 | 1 season, 10 episodes | 40–51 min | Pending |
| Valentina and the 12 Signs | Romantic comedy | November 18, 2026 | 1 season, 8 episodes | 31–36 min | Pending |
Awaiting release
| Grifters | Crime drama | December 9, 2026 | TBA | TBA | Pending |
| The Faithful Gathering | Sitcom | December 16, 2026 | TBA | TBA | Pending |

=== Spanish ===
| Title | Genre | Premiere | Seasons | Runtime | Status |
|---|---|---|---|---|---|
| Alpha Males | Comedy | December 30, 2022 | 5 seasons, 42 episodes | 30–40 min | Renewed for final season |
| The Manny | Comedy | December 24, 2023 | 3 seasons, 26 episodes | 30–41 min | Pending |
| Gangs of Galicia | Crime drama | June 21, 2024 | 2 seasons, 13 episodes | 40–56 min | Renewed for final season |
| The Accident | Drama | August 21, 2024 | 2 seasons, 16 episodes | 40–50 min | Pending |
| Breathless | Medical drama | August 30, 2024 | 2 seasons, 16 episodes | 40–56 min | Renewed for final season |
| The Eternaut | Science fiction | April 30, 2025 | 1 season, 6 episodes | 44–68 min | Renewed |
| In the Mud | Drama | August 14, 2025 | 2 seasons, 16 episodes | 38–58 min | Renewed |
| Old Dog, New Tricks | Comedy | October 3, 2025 | 1 season, 9 episodes | 25–32 min | Season 2 due to premiere on January 1, 2027; Renewed |
| City of Shadows | Crime thriller | December 12, 2025 | 1 season, 6 episodes | 42–53 min | Pending |
| Love from 9 to 5 | Romantic comedy | January 1, 2026 | 1 season, 8 episodes | 33–39 min | Pending |
| Time Flies | Drama | January 1, 2026 | 1 season, 6 episodes | 27–37 min | Pending |
| Salvador | Action drama | February 6, 2026 | 1 season, 8 episodes | 39–51 min | Pending |
| Santita | Drama | April 22, 2026 | 1 season, 7 episodes | 32–46 min | Pending |
| Between Father and Son | Drama | May 13, 2026 | 1 season, 20 episodes | 6–10 min | Pending |
| Carizzma | Comedy | May 20, 2026 | 1 season, 10 episodes | 9–15 min | Pending |
| Oasis | Thriller | June 19, 2026 | 1 season, 8 episodes | 38–48 min | Pending |
| Salcedo, Leather, and Boogaloo | Drama | July 8, 2026 | 1 season, 12 episodes | 6–7 min | Pending |
| My Daughter's Father | Drama | July 22, 2026 | 1 season, 10 episodes | 40–49 min | Pending |
| Final Project | Teen drama | July 29, 2026 | 1 season, 20 episodes | 7–10 min | Pending |
| Moria | Biopic | August 14, 2026 | 1 season, 8 episodes | 28–46 min | Pending |
| Lovesick | Historical drama | September 2, 2026 | 1 season, 7 episodes | 51–66 min | Pending |
| Stolen Heartbeats | Supernatural crime thriller | September 11, 2026 | 1 season, 50 episodes | 2–7 min | Pending |
| Inside the Circle | Crime drama | October 7, 2026 | 1 season, 8 episodes | 42–50 min | Pending |
| Fading Grandeur | Comedy | October 23, 2026 | 1 season, 6 episodes | 27–32 min | Pending |
| Alicia's Law | Legal drama | November 11, 2026 | 1 season, 10 episodes | 41–48 min | New episodes due to premiere on December 9, 2026 |
Awaiting release
| The December Breeze | Historical drama | December 4, 2026 | 1 season, 8 episodes | TBA | Pending |
| The Palace of Secrets | Historical drama | January 22, 2027 | 1 season, 8 episodes | TBA | Miniseries |

=== Thai ===
| Title | Genre | Premiere | Seasons | Runtime | Status |
|---|---|---|---|---|---|
| The Evil Lawyer | Legal drama | June 11, 2026 | 1 season, 8 episodes | 40–67 min | Pending |
| Delusion | Crime drama | September 24, 2026 | 1 season, 6 episodes | 43–60 min | Pending |
Awaiting release
| Empress of Flames | Period drama | December 3, 2026 | TBA | TBA | Pending |

=== Turkish ===
| Title | Genre | Premiere | Seasons | Runtime | Status |
|---|---|---|---|---|---|
| Ethos | Drama | November 12, 2020 | 2 seasons, 12 episodes | 29–58 min | Pending |
| Graveyard | Drama | June 17, 2022 | 3 seasons, 20 episodes | 41–116 min | Pending |
| Another Self | Drama | July 28, 2022 | 3 seasons, 24 episodes | 37–67 min | Pending |
| Thank You, Next | Romantic comedy | May 9, 2024 | 3 seasons, 24 episodes | 29–57 min | Pending |
| Old Money | Drama | October 10, 2025 | 1 season, 8 episodes | 36–51 min | Renewed |
| To Love, To Lose | Drama | January 15, 2026 | 1 season, 8 episodes | 44–62 min | Pending |
| Not a Stranger | Thriller | September 17, 2026 | 1 season, 8 episodes | 42–58 min | Pending |
| Money Trap: The Karun Treasure | Action comedy | October 16, 2026 | 1 season, 8 episodes | 37–55 min | Pending |
Awaiting release
| Hide and See | Crime drama | December 17, 2026 | TBA | TBA | Pending |

=== Zulu ===
| Title | Genre | Premiere | Seasons | Runtime | Status |
|---|---|---|---|---|---|
| Blood Legacy | Drama | September 20, 2024 | 2 seasons, 40 episodes | 20–38 min | Pending |
| Marked | Drama | July 31, 2025 | 1 season, 6 episodes | 40–53 min | Renewed |
| The Polygamist | Telenovela | June 12, 2026 | 1 season, 22 episodes | 23–30 min | Pending |
| Umthetho | Crime drama | August 14, 2026 | 1 season, 7 episodes | 35–56 min | Pending |

=== Other ===
| Title | Genre | Premiere | Seasons | Runtime | Language | Status |
|---|---|---|---|---|---|---|
| The Chestnut Man | Crime drama | September 29, 2021 | 2 seasons, 12 episodes | 43–59 min | Danish | Pending |
| Kohrra | Crime drama | July 15, 2023 | 2 seasons, 12 episodes | 38–60 min | Punjabi | Pending |
| Bros | Comedy drama | April 18, 2024 | 2 season, 17 episodes | 29–57 min | Hebrew | Pending |
| How to Ruin Love | Comedy | May 31, 2024 | 2 seasons, 7 episodes | 43–50 min | Sotho | Pending |
| The Åre Murders | Crime drama | February 6, 2025 | 1 season, 5 episodes | 35–57 min | Swedish | Season 2 due to premiere on December 27, 2026 |
| Tuiskoms | Romance | February 28, 2025 | 1 season, 7 episodes | 45–48 min | Afrikaans | Season 2 due to premiere on December 17, 2026 |
| The Asset | Crime drama | October 27, 2025 | 1 season, 6 episodes | 39–50 min | Danish | Renewed |
| Alkhallat+: The Series | Comedy | April 2, 2026 | 1 season, 4 episodes | 37–51 min | Arabic | Pending |
| Made with Love | Romantic comedy | April 15, 2026 | 1 season, 8 episodes | 30–37 min | Indonesian | Pending |
| Night Shift for Cuties | Slice of life comedy | June 4, 2026 | 1 season, 8 episodes | 25–35 min | Indonesian | Pending |
| Super Subbu | Comedy drama | July 2, 2026 | 1 season, 7 episodes | 35–42 min | Telugu | Pending |
| Blood Sacrifice | Crime drama | August 20, 2026 | 1 season, 5 episodes | 44–58 min | Swedish | Pending |
| #Love | Romance drama | October 2, 2026 | 1 season, 6 episodes | 26–38 min | Tamil | Pending |
| Balaraw: Blood Island | Folk horror | October 29, 2026 | 1 season, 6 episodes | 43–62 min | Filipino | Pending |
| Obsess | Psychological horror | October 30, 2026 | 1 season, 4 episodes | 49–58 min | Arabic | Pending |
Awaiting release
| A Filipino Christmas | Holiday drama anthology | November 26, 2026 | TBA | TBA | Filipino | Pending |

== Unscripted ==
=== Docuseries ===
| Title | Subject | Premiere | Seasons | Runtime | Language | Status |
|---|---|---|---|---|---|---|
| Chef's Table | Restaurant industry | April 26, 2015 | 7 seasons, 34 episodes | 41–58 min | English | Renewed for seasons 8–9 |
| Formula 1: Drive to Survive | Sports | March 8, 2019 | 8 seasons, 78 episodes | 27–52 min | English | Renewed |
| Full Swing | Sports | February 15, 2023 | 4 seasons, 27 episodes | 39–60 min | English | Pending |
| Quarterback | Sports | July 12, 2023 | 3 seasons, 22 episodes | 43–57 min | English | Pending |
| Homicide | True crime | March 20, 2024 | 3 seasons, 15 episodes | 42–65 min | English | Pending |
| America's Sweethearts: Dallas Cowboys Cheerleaders | Sports | June 20, 2024 | 3 seasons, 21 episodes | 44–76 min | English | Renewed |
| Kaulitz & Kaulitz | Music | June 25, 2024 | 3 seasons, 24 episodes | 37–54 min | German | Pending |
| Worst Ex Ever | True crime | August 28, 2024 | 2 seasons, 8 episodes | 51–78 min | English | Pending |
| WWE Unreal | Sports | July 29, 2025 | 3 seasons, 15 episodes | 51–65 min | English | Pending |
| Sean Combs: The Reckoning | Music/True crime | December 2, 2025 | 1 season, 4 episodes | 55–67 min | English | Pending |
| Simon Cowell: The Next Act | Music industry | December 10, 2025 | 1 season, 6 episodes | 34–66 min | English | Pending |
| Glitter & Gold: Ice Dancing | Sports | February 1, 2026 | 1 season, 3 episodes | 48–65 min | English | Pending |
| Reality Check: Inside America's Next Top Model | Television industry | February 16, 2026 | 1 season, 3 episodes | 51–60 min | English | Pending |
| Being Gordon Ramsay | Restaurant industry | February 18, 2026 | 1 season, 6 episodes | 37–51 min | English | Renewed |
| The Dinosaurs | Natural history | March 6, 2026 | 1 season, 4 episodes | 44–48 min | English | Pending |
| Dynasty: The Murdochs | Business | March 13, 2026 | 1 season, 4 episodes | 47–55 min | English | Pending |
| Trust Me: The False Prophet | True crime | April 8, 2026 | 1 season, 4 episodes | 44–53 min | English | Pending |
| This Is a Gardening Show | Gardening | April 22, 2026 | 1 season, 6 episodes | 15–16 min | English | Pending |
| Michael Jackson: The Verdict | Celebrity/True crime | June 3, 2026 | 1 season, 3 episodes | 46–55 min | English | Pending |
| The American Experiment | History | June 24, 2026 | 1 season, 5 episodes | 66–84 min | English | Pending |
| Worst Neighbor Ever | True crime | July 1, 2026 | 1 season, 4 episodes | 52–61 min | English | Pending |
| The Idaho Murders: College Nightmare | True crime | July 29, 2026 | 1 season, 3 episodes | 44 min | English | Pending |
| Mourinho | Sports | August 11, 2026 | 1 season, 3 episodes | 55–61 min | English | Pending |
| Conversations with a Killer: The Charles Manson Tapes | True crime | August 12, 2026 | 1 season, 3 episodes | 53–60 min | English | Pending |
| Death of the Pastor's Wife | True crime | August 26, 2026 | 1 season, 3 episodes | 42–48 min | English | Pending |
| The One About Matthew Perry | Biography | October 27, 2026 | 1 season, 3 episodes | 58–62 min | English | Pending |
| Taken: Natalee Holloway | True crime | November 4, 2026 | 1 season, 3 episodes | 36–39 min | English | Pending |
Awaiting release
| The Trials of Karen Read | True crime | November 23, 2026 | 3 episodes | TBA | English | Miniseries |
| World War II: Behind Enemy Lines | History | December 2, 2026 | 4 episodes | 45 min | English | Miniseries |

=== Reality ===
| Title | Genre | Premiere | Seasons | Runtime | Language | Status |
|---|---|---|---|---|---|---|
| Selling Sunset | Docu-soap | March 22, 2019 | 9 seasons, 90 episodes | 23–80 min | English | Season 10 due to premiere on December 4, 2026 |
| Love Is Blind | Dating show | February 13, 2020 | 11 seasons, 149 episodes | 31–104 min | English | Pending |
| The Ultimatum: Marry or Move On | Dating show | April 6, 2022 | 4 seasons, 40 episodes | 35–63 min | English | Pending |
| Love on the Spectrum | Docu-reality dating show | May 18, 2022 | 4 seasons, 27 episodes | 37–55 min | English | Renewed |
| Rhythm + Flow France | Rap music competition | June 9, 2022 | 5 seasons, 43 episodes | 32–60 min | French | Pending |
| Dubai Bling | Docu-reality | October 27, 2022 | 3 seasons, 25 episodes | 41–66 min | Arabic | Renewed |
| Perfect Match | Dating show | February 14, 2023 | 4 seasons, 40 episodes | 38–106 min | English | Pending |
| Too Hot to Handle: Germany | Dating show | February 28, 2023 | 2 seasons, 18 episodes | 39–60 min | German | Renewed |
| King of Collectibles: The Goldin Touch | Docu-reality | April 28, 2023 | 3 seasons, 20 episodes | 27–41 min | English | Pending |
| Love Village | Dating show | May 2, 2023 | 3 seasons, 61 episodes | 25–41 min | Japanese | Pending |
| At Home with the Furys | Docu-soap | August 16, 2023 | 2 seasons, 19 episodes | 28–46 min | English | Renewed |
| The Devil's Plan | Reality game show | September 26, 2023 | 3 seasons, 38 episodes | 58–106 min | Korean | Season 3 ongoing |
| Stranded with My Mother-in-Law | Survival competition | October 9, 2023 | 3 seasons, 25 episodes | 42–72 min | Portuguese | Season 4 due to premiere on November 25, 2026 |
| Squid Game: The Challenge | Reality competition | November 22, 2023 | 2 seasons, 19 episodes | 40–59 min | English | Renewed |
| Love Is Blind: Sweden | Dating show | January 12, 2024 | 3 seasons, 35 episodes | 23–74 min | Swedish | Pending |
| Rhythm + Flow Italy | Rap music competition | February 19, 2024 | 3 seasons, 25 episodes | 42–57 min | Italian | Pending |
| Unlocked: A Jail Experiment | Docu-reality | April 10, 2024 | 2 seasons, 16 episodes | 33–49 min | English | Pending |
| Agents of Mystery | Reality game show | June 18, 2024 | 2 seasons, 15 episodes | 33–64 min | Korean | Pending |
| Owning Manhattan | Reality | June 28, 2024 | 2 seasons, 16 episodes | 38–49 min | English | Pending |
| The Boyfriend | Dating show | July 9, 2024 | 2 seasons, 25 episodes | 37–55 min | Japanese | Pending |
| Love Is Blind: UK | Dating show | August 7, 2024 | 3 seasons, 37 episodes | 34–72 min | English | Renewed |
| Culinary Class Wars | Cooking competition | September 17, 2024 | 2 seasons, 25 episodes | 60–96 min | Korean | Season 3 due to premiere in 2026 |
| Love Is Blind, Habibi | Dating show | October 10, 2024 | 2 seasons, 21 episodes | 46–67 min | Arabic | Season 2 ongoing |
| Love Is Blind: Argentina | Dating show | November 6, 2024 | 2 seasons, 22 episodes | 46–69 min | Spanish | Pending |
| The Later Daters | Dating show | November 29, 2024 | 1 season, 8 episodes | 35–47 min | English | Season 2 due to premiere on December 30, 2026 |
| Love Is Blind: Germany | Dating show | January 3, 2025 | 2 seasons, 20 episodes | 42–66 min | German | Renewed |
| Million Dollar Secret | Reality game show | March 26, 2025 | 2 seasons, 16 episodes | 48–63 min | English | Renewed |
| Kian's Bizarre B&B | Docu-reality | April 8, 2025 | 2 seasons, 19 episodes | 50–77 min | Korean | Pending |
| Yolanthe | Docu-soap | June 18, 2025 | 1 season, 7 episodes | 33–48 min | Dutch | Season 2 due to premiere on December 10, 2026 |
| Better Late Than Single | Dating show | July 8, 2025 | 2 seasons, 20 episodes | 68–98 min | Korean | Pending |
| Physical: Asia | Reality competition | October 28, 2025 | 1 season, 12 episodes | 56–106 min | Korean | Renewed |
| Love Is Blind: Italy | Dating show | December 1, 2025 | 1 season, 10 episodes | 57–65 min | Italian | Pending |
| Badly in Love | Dating show | December 9, 2025 | 2 seasons, 30 episodes | 37–75 min | Japanese | Pending |
| What's in the Box | Game show | December 17, 2025 | 1 season, 6 episodes | 41–47 min | English | Pending |
| Members Only: Palm Beach | Docu-reality | December 29, 2025 | 1 season, 8 episodes | 35–49 min | English | Pending |
| My Korean Boyfriend | Docu-reality | January 1, 2026 | 1 season, 8 episodes | 25–46 min | Portuguese | Pending |
| Blue Therapy | Docu-reality | March 4, 2026 | 1 season, 8 episodes | 32–40 min | English | Pending |
| Age of Attraction | Dating show | March 11, 2026 | 1 season, 8 episodes | 49–71 min | English | Renewed |
| Ready or Not: Texas | Travel docu-reality | March 24, 2026 | 1 season, 6 episodes | 30–44 min | Korean | Pending |
| Funny AF with Kevin Hart | Stand-up comedy competition | April 20, 2026 | 1 season, 8 episodes | 49–70 min | English | Renewed |
| Love Is Blind: Poland | Dating show | May 6, 2026 | 1 season, 11 episodes | 41–90 min | Polish | Pending |
| Desi Bling | Docu-soap | May 20, 2026 | 1 season, 7 episodes | 37–47 min | English; Hindi | Pending |
| Jae-seok's B&B Rules! | Docu-reality | May 26, 2026 | 1 season, 10 episodes | 48–73 min | Korean | Pending |
| Calabasas Confidential | Docu-reality | May 29, 2026 | 1 season, 8 episodes | 44–54 min | English | Pending |
| Outlast: The Jungle | Survival competition | June 10, 2026 | 1 season, 8 episodes | 43–58 min | English | Renewed |
| Let's Marry Harry | Dating show | August 5, 2026 | 1 season, 8 episodes | 53–76 min | English | Pending |
| Take a Hike! | Travel docu-reality | August 18, 2026 | 1 season, 10 episodes | 57–86 min | Korean | Pending |
| Mom Knows Best? | Reality competition | August 26, 2026 | 1 season, 8 episodes | 48–58 min | Portuguese | Pending |
| Earle Meets World | Reality | September 4, 2026 | 1 season, 8 episodes | 30–45 min | English | Renewed |
| Physical 100: Italy | Reality competition | September 11, 2026 | 1 season, 8 episodes | 42–62 min | Italian | Pending |
| Physical 100: Mexico | Reality competition | September 16, 2026 | 1 season, 9 episodes | 42–61 min | Spanish | Pending |
| Wonka's The Golden Ticket | Reality competition | September 23, 2026 | 1 season, 9 episodes | 45–55 min | English | Pending |
| Outside | Survival competition | September 28, 2026 | 1 season, 8 episodes | 32–58 min | English | Pending |
| The Arena | Sports reality competition | September 30, 2026 | 1 season, 10 episodes | 40–67 min | French | Pending |
| Love Is Blind: Netherlands | Dating show | September 30, 2026 | 1 season, 10 episodes | 56–71 min | Dutch | Pending |
| The New Stanford Prison Experiment | Reality competition | October 21, 2026 | 1 season, 6 episodes | 42–59 min | English | Pending |
| Stars and Vows: Anele and Buzza | Docu-soap | November 13, 2026 | 1 season, 4 episodes | 40–53 min | English | Pending |
| Win the Mall | Reality competition | November 18, 2026 | 1 season, 8 episodes | 51–56 min | English | Pending |
Awaiting release
| Salish's 12 Games of Christmas | Reality competition | November 28, 2026 | 1 season, 4 episodes | 32 min | English | Pending |
| Honey Trap | Hidden camera prank show | December 1, 2026 | TBA | TBA | Japanese | Pending |
| Love Is Blind: South Africa | Dating show | December 4, 2026 | TBA | TBA | English | Pending |
| Gabby's Dollhouse: Makers and Bakers | Family reality competition | December 9, 2026 | 1 season, 4 episodes | TBA | English | Pending |
| Million Dollar Secret: Mexico | Reality game show | December 18, 2026 | TBA | TBA | Spanish | Pending |
| Raising the Cannons | Docu-reality | December 18, 2026 | 1 season, 8 episodes | 45 min | English | Pending |

=== Variety ===
| Title | Genre | Premiere | Seasons | Runtime | Language | Status |
|---|---|---|---|---|---|---|
| My Next Guest Needs No Introduction with David Letterman | Interview | January 12, 2018 | 6 seasons, 29 episodes | 41–58 min | English | Season 7 due to premiere on December 15, 2026 |
| Last One Standing | Crime comedy/variety show | March 8, 2022 | 4 seasons, 32 episodes | 30–54 min | Japanese | Pending |
| Dinner Time Live with David Chang | Cooking show/Talk show | January 25, 2024 | 3 seasons, 51 episodes | 45–89 min | English | Pending |
| The Great Indian Kapil Show | Talk show | March 30, 2024 | 5 seasons, 63 episodes | 38–79 min | Hindi | Season 5 ongoing |
| Everybody's Live with John Mulaney | Talk show | March 12, 2025 | 1 season, 12 episodes | 57–68 min | English | Renewed |
| Six Kings Slam | Sporting event | October 15, 2025 | 1 season, 3 episodes | 202–245 min | English | Season 2 due to premiere on December 27, 2026 |
| Hot Ones: Extra Heat | Talk show | July 13, 2026 | 2 episodes | 26–29 min | English | New episode due to premiere on December 2, 2026 |
| Cold as Balls | Talk show | September 20, 2026 | 1 season, 7 episodes | 10–15 min | English | Pending |
Awaiting release
| Chiranjeevi's Megaverse | Talk show | December 11, 2026 | TBA | TBA | Telugu | Pending |

== Continuations ==
These shows have been picked up by Netflix for additional seasons after having aired previous seasons on another network.

| Title | Genre | Previous network(s) | Premiere | Seasons | Runtime | Language | Status |
|---|---|---|---|---|---|---|---|
| Black Mirror (series 3–7) | Science fiction anthology | Channel 4 | October 21, 2016 | 5 seasons, 26 episodes | 40–90 min | English | Renewed |
| Inside (seasons 2–3) | Reality competition | YouTube | March 17, 2025 | 2 seasons, 16 episodes | 27–63 min | English | Pending |
| Crime Scene (season 5) | Murder mystery reality television | JTBC (seasons 1–3); TVING (season 4) | September 23, 2025 | 1 season, 10 episodes | 71–87 min | Korean | Renewed |
| Three Idiots (season 3) | Variety | tvN | November 25, 2025 | 1 season, 6 episodes | 58–97 min | Korean | Pending |
| Star Search (season 15) | Talent show | Syndication (seasons 1–13); CBS (season 14) | January 20, 2026 | 1 season, 9 episodes | 70–91 min | English | Pending |
| Pop Culture Jeopardy! (season 2) | Game show | Amazon Prime Video | May 11, 2026 | 1 season, 20 episodes | 24–29 min | English | Pending |
| Lock Upp (season 2) | Reality competition | ALTBalaji & MX Player | June 27, 2026 | 1 season, 35 episodes | 45–89 min | Hindi | Renewed |
| Dhindora (season 2) | Comedy drama | YouTube | November 20, 2026 | 1 season, 8 episodes | 26–34 min | Hindi | Pending |

== Specials ==
These are one-time original events or episodic supplementary content related to original series.

=== Episodic ===
| Title | Genre | Premiere | Seasons | Runtime | Language | Status |
|---|---|---|---|---|---|---|
| Famous Last Words | Culture docuseries | October 3, 2025 | 3 episodes | 46–55 min | English | Pending |
| Is It Cake? Halloween | Baking competition | October 8, 2025 | 2 seasons, 7 episodes | 35–41 min | English | Pending |
| One Piece Bonus Content | Behind the scenes | March 17, 2026 | 2 seasons, 7 episodes | 3–7 min | English | Pending |
Awaiting release
| Beyond Society | Docuseries | December 18, 2026 | TBA | TBA | Spanish | Pending |

== Regional original programming ==
These shows are originals because Netflix commissioned or acquired them and had their premiere on the service, but they are not available in all Netflix territories.

| Title | Genre | Premiere | Seasons | Runtime | Language | Netflix exclusive region | Status |
|---|---|---|---|---|---|---|---|
| Bad Exorcist | Horror comedy | December 3, 2020 | 7 seasons, 91 episodes | 9–17 min | Polish | Poland | Pending |
| The Hunting Wives | Drama | July 21, 2025 | 1 season, 8 episodes | 46–55 min | English | Selected territories | Season 2 due to premiere on November 26, 2026; Renewed |
| Innate | Psychological thriller | December 23, 2025 | 1 season, 8 episodes | 44–48 min | Spanish | Spain | Pending |
| Doc | Medical telenovela | March 4, 2026 | 1 season, 40 episodes | 43–48 min | Spanish | Latin America | Pending |

=== Co-productions ===
These shows have been commissioned by Netflix in cooperation with a partner network.

| Title | Genre | Partner/Country | Premiere | Seasons | Runtime | Language | Netflix exclusive regions | Status |
|---|---|---|---|---|---|---|---|---|
| Single's Inferno | Dating show | JTBC/South Korea | December 18, 2021 | 5 seasons, 53 episodes | 54–100 min | Korean | All other markets | Renewed |
| The Parisian Agency: Exclusive Properties (seasons 2–6) | Property management reality | TMC/France | March 3, 2022 | 5 seasons, 41 episodes | 51–70 min | French | Selected territories | Pending |
| A Good Girl's Guide to Murder | Coming-of-age mystery thriller | BBC Three/United Kingdom; ZDFneo/Germany | August 1, 2024 | 2 seasons, 12 episodes | 41–51 min | English | All other markets except Australia and New Zealand | Final season due to premiere in 2027 |
| North of North | Coming of age comedy | APTN and CBC Television/Canada | April 10, 2025 | 2 seasons, 16 episodes | 23–28 min | English | All other markets | Pending |
| Cunk on Cinema | Mockumentary | BBC Two/United Kingdom | November 15, 2026 | 1 season, 6 episodes | 13–15 min | English | All other markets | Pending |

=== Continuations ===
| Title | Genre | Previous network(s) | Premiere | Seasons | Runtime | Language | Netflix exclusive region | Status |
|---|---|---|---|---|---|---|---|---|
| Temptation Island (seasons 9–10) | Reality | Fox (seasons 1–3); USA Network (seasons 4–8) | March 12, 2025 | 2 seasons, 19 episodes | 48–66 min | English | Selected territories | Renewed |
| Rosario Tijeras (seasons 4–5) | Telenovela | Azteca 13 (season 1); Azteca 7 (seasons 2–3) | June 18, 2025 | 2 seasons, 78 episodes | 41–46 min | Spanish | Selected territories | Renewed |
| Sesame Street (season 56) | Educational | NET (season 1); PBS (seasons 2–45); HBO Kids (seasons 46–50); HBO Max/Max (seasons 51–55) | November 10, 2025 | 3 volumes, 13 episodes | 30 min | English | All markets excluding Austria, Germany, and Switzerland | Season 57 due to premiere on November 23, 2026 |

== Upcoming original programming ==
The following projects have all received series orders from Netflix or are in development, but currently have an unknown specific release date at this time.

=== Drama ===
| Title | Genre | Premiere |
|---|---|---|
| Blackmere | Crime thriller | Early 2027 |
| Scooby-Doo: Origins | Teen mystery | 2027 |
| Other Worlds: A Stranger Things Adventure | Science fiction horror | 2028 |
| Alexander | Drama | TBA |
| All the Sinners Bleed | Crime thriller | TBA |
| The Apology | Thriller | TBA |
| Arrivals: A New Manifest Mystery | Supernatural drama | TBA |
| Assassin's Creed | Historical action | TBA |
| Barbaric | Medieval fantasy | TBA |
| Black Hole | Supernatural horror | TBA |
| The Boys from Brazil | Conspiracy thriller miniseries | TBA |
| Breakers | Drama | TBA |
| Calabasas | Teen drama | TBA |
| The Corrections | Drama miniseries | TBA |
| Enigma Variations | Romantic drama | TBA |
| Ghettoside | Crime drama miniseries | TBA |
| The God of the Woods | Mystery crime drama | TBA |
| The Granville Girls | Romantic drama | TBA |
| Grown Ups | Drama | TBA |
| How to Kill Your Family | Drama | TBA |
| Icebreaker | Romantic drama | TBA |
| The Innocent | Mystery thriller | TBA |
| Jaq | Crime drama | TBA |
| Jonny Boy | Crime drama | TBA |
| Jupiter Island | Sports drama | TBA |
| Kennedy | Historical drama | TBA |
| Ladies of the House | Drama | TBA |
| Lonesome Dove | Western drama | TBA |
| The Lords' Day | Political thriller | TBA |
| Lovesick | Romance drama | TBA |
| Mercenary: An Extraction Series | Action thriller | TBA |
| Myron Bolitar | Drama | TBA |
| Pagans | Supernatural drama | TBA |
| Poser | Young adult drama | TBA |
| Prep | Young adult drama | TBA |
| Queenstown | Drama | TBA |
| Rabbit, Rabbit | Crime drama | TBA |
| The Retrievals | Drama miniseries | TBA |
| The Roman | Drama | TBA |
| Sid & Zoey | Supernatural mystery teen drama | TBA |
| So Far Gone | Crime drama | TBA |
| The Sticks | Sports drama | TBA |
| This Summer Will Be Different | Romance drama | TBA |
| Thumblite | Thriller | TBA |
| Trigger Point | Action crime drama | TBA |
| Twisted Love | Romantic drama | TBA |
| Uncorked | Comedy drama | TBA |
| The Unheard | Drama miniseries | TBA |
| Untitled Alan Chikin Chow series | Musical drama | TBA |
| Untitled Bridgerton spin-off series | Alternate historical romance miniseries | TBA |
| Untitled bull riding series | Drama | TBA |
| Untitled Roald Dahl series | Drama | TBA |
| Untitled The Secret of Secrets series | Mystery thriller | TBA |
| Untitled A Spy in the Blood series | Spy drama | TBA |
| Weather Girl | Drama miniseries | TBA |
| Where There's Smoke | Drama | TBA |
| Witch Hunt | Crime drama | TBA |
| The Woods | Crime drama | TBA |

=== Comedy ===
| Title | Genre | Premiere |
|---|---|---|
| All the Rage | Dark comedy | TBA |
| Feral | Dark comedy thriller | TBA |
| A Hundred Percent | Comedy | TBA |
| Jig | Mockumentary | TBA |
| Marbles | Family comedy | TBA |
| I Suck at Girls | Comedy | TBA |

=== Animation ===
==== Adult animation ====
| Title | Genre | Premiere | Language |
|---|---|---|---|
| Planeswalker | Fantasy | 2027 | English |
| Dad's House | Comedy | TBA | English |
| Dealies | Comedy | TBA | English |
| Grendel | Supernatural noir crime drama | TBA | English |
| Midnight Sun | Supernatural horror | TBA | English |
| Untitled Absurdaverse series | Comedy satire | TBA | English |

==== Anime ====
| Title | Genre | Premiere |
|---|---|---|
| The One Piece | Adventure/science fantasy | February 2027 |
| Beat & Motion | Coming-of-age drama | 2027 |
| Jimoto Saiko! | Dark comedy | TBA |

==== Kids & family ====
| Title | Genre | Language | Premiere |
|---|---|---|---|
| Ghostbusters: Night Shift | Horror comedy | English | 2027 |
| Mafalda | Comedy | Spanish | 2027 |
| Motel Transylvania | Horror comedy | English | 2027 |
| Puppy Pirates | Preschool adventure | English | TBA |
| Untitled Clash of Clans series | Adventure | English | TBA |
| Untitled Minecraft series | Adventure | English | TBA |
| Young MacDonald | Preschool musical | English | TBA |

=== Non-English language scripted ===
==== German ====
| Title | Genre | Premiere |
|---|---|---|
| Dolly | Historical drama | TBA |
| Love & Chaos | Drama | TBA |
| Witches | Historical drama | TBA |

==== Hindi ====
| Title | Genre | Premiere |
|---|---|---|
| Family Business | Drama | 2026 |
| Talaash: A Mother's Search | Mystery thriller | 2026 |
| Yeh Dil Sun Raha Hai | Thriller | 2026 |
| Rakt Bramhand – The Bloody Kingdom | Fantasy action | TBA |
| Tunnel Men | Thriller drama | TBA |

==== Italian ====
| Title | Genre | Premiere |
|---|---|---|
| Nemesis | Thriller | 2026 |
| SuburraMaxima | Crime drama | 2026 |
| The Label | Drama | TBA |
| Why Not Me? | Comedy | TBA |

==== Korean ====
| Title | Genre | Premiere |
|---|---|---|
| The Facade of Love | Romance melodrama | 2026 |
| Long Vacation | Romance drama | 2026 |
| Kin and Sin | Noir family drama | 2027 |
| Men of the Harem | Romantic fantasy | 2027 |
| Daughter | Revenge drama | TBA |
| The Dealer | Crime drama | TBA |
| Fall in! Love | Romantic comedy | TBA |
| First Doctor | Medical drama | TBA |
| Grand Galaxy Hotel | Romantic fantasy | TBA |
| Love O'Clock | Romantic fantasy | TBA |
| Materesa | Crime drama | TBA |
| No Crushing Allowed | Teen romance | TBA |
| Outback | Mystery noir | TBA |
| Paper Man | Crime drama | TBA |
| She, Wolf | Romantic fantasy | TBA |
| The Shooter | Action noir | TBA |
| Solo Leveling | Action fantasy | TBA |
| The Twilight Between Us | Action romance period drama | TBA |
| Variety | Drama | TBA |

==== Mandarin ====
| Title | Genre | Premiere |
|---|---|---|
| Confessions | Psychological thriller | 2026 |
| How to Survive Med School | Drama | 2026 |
| Pacify | Science fiction action thriller | 2026 |

==== Portuguese ====
| Title | Genre | Premiere |
|---|---|---|
| As Crianças Estão de Volta | Drama | TBA |
| Happy Old Year | Drama | TBA |
| Imperfect Mother | Telenovela | TBA |
| MED | Medical drama | TBA |
| Untitled open marriage series | Comedy | TBA |

==== Spanish ====
| Title | Genre | Premiere |
|---|---|---|
| Lobo | Historical true crime drama miniseries | 2026 |
| Crimen desorganizado | Dark comedy crime thriller | 2027 |
| The Future Is Ours | Dystopian science fiction | 2027 |
| Tiempo al tiempo | Science fiction romantic comedy | 2027 |
| Untitled Sebastián Borensztein series | Historical drama | 2027 |
| Dogman | Sports drama | TBA |
| Jotadé | Crime thriller miniseries | TBA |
| La madre perfecta | Mystery | TBA |
| Nine Queens | Crime drama | TBA |
| The Night Marta Disappeared | True crime drama miniseries | TBA |
| Queenpin | Crime drama | TBA |
| Reasonable Doubts | Legal drama miniseries | TBA |
| Un tipo de cuidado | Comedy drama | TBA |
| Untitled Daniel Sancho series | True crime drama miniseries | TBA |
| The Whisper of Fire | Thriller miniseries | TBA |

==== Other ====
| Title | Genre | Premiere | Language |
|---|---|---|---|
| BuyBust: The Undesirables | Action thriller | 2026 | Filipino |
| Legacy | Crime drama | 2026 | Telugu |
| From NEET to Peak | Romantic comedy | January 2027 | Japanese |
| Parasyte: Tamiya | Science fiction horror | 2027 | Japanese |
| Stiffs | Crime drama | 2028 | Polish |
| Chasing Shadows | Crime drama | TBA | Arabic |
| Florida | Drama | TBA | Norwegian |
| Nights & Days | Historical drama | TBA | Polish |
| The Silence | Psychological thriller | TBA | Dutch |
| Untitled Hadewych Minis and Geert van Rampelberg series | Romantic drama | TBA | Dutch |

=== Unscripted ===
==== Docuseries ====
| Title | Subject | Premiere | Language |
|---|---|---|---|
| Untitled Tony Parsons docuseries | True crime | 2026 | English |
| Born in the USA | Health care | TBA | English |
| Criminopatía | True crime | TBA | Spanish |
| Hunting Gary Glitter | True crime | TBA | English |
| Jack Unterweger | True crime | TBA | German |
| Pinzner: German Hitman | True crime | TBA | German |
| This Blew Up | Social media | TBA | English |
| Untitled Alejandro Sanz docuseries | Music | TBA | Spanish |
| Untitled Carmen Cervera docuseries | Celebrity | TBA | Spanish |
| Untitled John Meehan docuseries | True crime | TBA | English |
| Untitled Jonestown docuseries | True crime | TBA | English |

==== Reality ====
| Title | Genre | Premiere | Language |
|---|---|---|---|
| Doors Closed, Bids Open | Reality | 2026 | Japanese |
| Schooled! | Science reality competition | 2026 | English |
| AK-69 presents Hip Hop Survival Audition | Music competition | 2027 | Japanese |
| Monopoly | Reality competition | 2027 | English |
| Physical 100: Sweden | Reality competition | 2027 | Swedish |
| Simon Says | Reality competition | 2027 | English |
| Summer Replay | Dating show | 2027 | Japanese |
| Vocal Class Wars | Music competition | 2027 | Korean |
| Arizona Hot | Docu-soap | TBA | English |
| Clue | Reality competition | TBA | English |
| Hot or Cold | Comedy competition | TBA | English |
| Love Is Blind: Denmark | Dating show | TBA | Danish |
| Love at First Sight | Dating show | TBA | English |
| Netflix, Will You Marry Me? | Dating show | TBA | English |
| Physical 100: France | Reality competition | TBA | French |
| Physical 100: USA | Reality competition | TBA | English |
| Playing with Matches | Reality competition | TBA | English |
| Plex: Ultima Partida | Reality competition | TBA | Spanish |
| Untitled Alan Ritchson survival competition series | Survival competition | TBA | English |
| Weight to Date | Docu-reality dating show | TBA | English |
| Zie Zarrellas | Docu-reality | TBA | German |

=== Co-productions ===
| Title | Genre | Partner/Country | Premiere | Language |
|---|---|---|---|---|
| Bannerman | Spy thriller | AMC/United States and Canada | TBA | English |
| The Countess of Monte Cristo | Historical drama miniseries | TF1/France | TBA | French |
| Jackdaws | Historical drama | TF1/France | TBA | French |
| Untitled Peaky Blinders sequel series | Historical crime drama | BBC One/United Kingdom | TBA | English |

=== In development ===
| Title | Genre |
|---|---|
| The Aisle | Political drama |
| All Boys | Drama |
| All We Ever Wanted | Drama |
| American Royals | Alternate history romantic drama |
| Anchivo Motors | Adult animated sitcom |
| And Justice for All | Legal drama |
| Angus, Thongs and Full-Frontal Snogging | Teen comedy drama |
| Anna O | Crime thriller |
| AWOL | Comedy drama |
| Bat Boy | Young adult horror comedy |
| Birthright | Drama |
| The Book of Two Ways | Drama |
| Broken Toys | Drama |
| Captain Planet | Superhero |
| Carrie Soto Is Back | Sports drama |
| Citizen's Arrest | Crime drama |
| Covers | Spy fiction |
| Crossroads | Drama |
| Dangerous Liaisons | Erotic thriller |
| Dead Letters | Psychological thriller |
| The Decorator | Drama |
| Diablo | Animated dark fantasy action |
| The Elissas | Teen drama |
| The Everlasting | Romantic fantasy |
| Fatherhood | Comedy drama |
| Forever, Interrupted | Drama miniseries |
| The Forgotten Realms | Fantasy |
| Glory Days | Sports drama |
| The Grays | Gothic |
| Grim | Adult animated horror fantasy |
| Hancock Park | Erotic thriller |
| The Headlands House | Thriller miniseries |
| Hit Man | Crime comedy |
| Hoops | Romantic drama |
| Impact Winter | Fantasy |
| In Case of Emergency | Adult animated sitcom |
| Kildare | Drama |
| Land of the Lost reboot | Science fiction |
| The Leftovers | Docu-reality |
| Lights Out | Dark romance |
| Minor Threats | Superhero |
| My Father's Son | Comedy |
| The Nanny Diaries | Comedy drama |
| Next Door | Thriller |
| The Only Child | Drama |
| Pain & Suffering | Crime procedural |
| Persona | Supernatural action teen drama |
| Physical: 100 Europe | Physical reality competition |
| Powers | Adult animated superhero fiction |
| Prism | Supernatural |
PUBG
| Ravenloft | Fantasy |
| The Savage, Noble Death of Babs Dionne | Crime thriller |
| Sex Act | Comedy |
| Sonic | Animated children's action |
| Such a Lovely Family | Mystery thriller |
| The Surf House | Thriller |
| They'll Never Catch Us | Thriller |
| Toxic Moms | Comedy |
| Tuesday Night Titans | Sports drama |
| Understudy | Drama |
| Untitled Alec Berg/Charlie Hall series | Crime comedy |
| Untitled Catan series | TBA |
| Untitled Chestnut Springs series | Romance |
| Untitled Crash Bandicoot series | Animation |
| Untitled David Zabel series | Legal drama |
| Untitled English-language Extraordinary Attorney Woo adaptation | Legal drama |
| Untitled Frida Kahlo and Diego Rivera series | Biopic |
| Untitled Halley Feiffer series | Drama |
| Untitled Julio Iglesias series | Biopic |
| Untitled Leila Gerstein series | Romantic comedy |
| Untitled The Lincoln Lawyer spin-off | Legal drama |
| Untitled Marc Cherry series | Drama |
| Untitled Madonna series | Biopic miniseries |
| Untitled Main Line murders series | Crime drama |
| Untitled Matt Rife series | Workplace comedy |
| Untitled New York Yankees series | Sports drama |
| Untitled Nikki Glaser series | Comedy |
| Untitled One Tree Hill reboot series | Teen drama |
| Untitled Overcooked competition series | Cooking competition |
| Untitled Paige DeSorbo and Hannah Berner comedy series | Comedy |
| Untitled Prince Harry and Meghan Markle scripted polo series | Sports drama |
| Untitled spiritual procedural series | Crime procedural/Supernatural |
| Untitled Virgin River prequel | Romantic drama |
| We Solve Murders | Murder mystery |
