= Love Is Blind =

Love Is Blind may refer to:

- "Love is blind", a proverbial phrase referring to the positive illusions held by a person in love

== Film ==
- Love Is Blind (1925 film), a German silent film directed by Lothar Mendes
- Love Is Blind, a 2002 film by Denis Piel
- Love Is Blind (2005 film), an Indian Gujarati film directed by Vipul Sharma
- Love Is Blind, a 2013 Estonian film directed by Ilmar Raag
- Love Is Blind (2016 film), a Philippine film directed by Jason Paul Laxamana
- Love Is Blind, a 2017 short film starring Arsi Nami
- Love Is Blind (2019 film), an American film directed by Andy Delaney and Monty Whitebloom

== Literature ==
- Love Is Blind (novel), a 2018 novel by William Boyd
- Love Is Blind, a 2006 novel by Lynsay Sands

== Music ==
=== Albums ===
- Love Is Blind (Claire Voyant album) or the title song, 2002
- Love Is Blind (Limahl album) or the title song, 1992
- Love Is Blind, by Metropolitan, featuring Bjørn Kjellemyr, 2004
- Love Is Blind, an EP by Haunts, 2009

=== Songs ===
- "Love Is Blind" (Donny Montell song), 2012
- "Love Is Blind" (Eve song), 1999
- "Love Is Blind", by Alicia Keys from The Element of Freedom, 2009
- "Love Is Blind", by Cristal Snow, competing to represent Finland in the Eurovision Song Contest 2016
- "Love Is Blind", by David Coverdale from Into the Light, 2000
- "Love Is Blind", by Dewa 19, 2023
- "Love Is Blind", by Dream Evil from United, 2006
- "Love Is Blind", by Fergie from Double Dutchess, 2017
- "Love Is Blind", by Gene Simmons from Gene Simmons Vault, 2017
- "Love Is Blind", by Human Nature from Walk the Tightrope, 2004
- "Love Is Blind", by Indiana Gregg from Woman at Work, 2007
- "Love Is Blind", by Janis Ian from Aftertones, 1976
- "Love Is Blind", by Kana Nishino, a B-side of the single "Aitakute Aitakute", 2010
- "Love Is Blind", by Låpsley from Long Way Home, 2016
- "Love Is Blind", by Nick Fradiani from Hurricane, 2016
- "Love Is Blind", by Pulp from Separations, 1992
- "Love Is Blind", by Ramzi and Ash King
- "Love Is Blind", by Ray Pilgrim, 1961
- "Love Is Blind", by Richie Kotzen from 24 Hours, 2011
- "Love Is Blind", from the film Anaganaga Oka Roju, 1996
- "Love Is Blind", from the musical Falsettos, 1992

== Television ==
- Love Is Blind (franchise), a reality television franchise on Netflix
  - Love Is Blind (American TV series)
  - Love Is Blind: Argentina
  - Love Is Blind: Brazil
  - Love Is Blind: France
  - Love Is Blind: Germany
  - Love Is Blind: Italy
  - Love Is Blind: Japan
  - Love Is Blind: Mexico
  - Love Is Blind: Poland
  - Love Is Blind: Sweden
  - Love Is Blind: UK
  - Love Is Blind: Habibi
- "Love Is Blind" (House), an episode of House
- "Love Is Blind" (The Twilight Zone), a 1989 episode of The Twilight Zone
- "Love Is Blind", an episode of Eddie Griffin: Going For Broke
- "Love Is Blind", an episode of Sanford
- "Love Is Blind", an episode of Total Blackout
- "Love Is Blind", an episode of USA High

== See also ==
- "Love Is Blindness", a song by U2
