= List of Love Is Blind: Sweden participants =

The following is a list of individuals who have appeared on the Netflix reality series Love Is Blind: Sweden.

== Participants ==
| Season | Name | Age | Occupation | Hometown | Relationship status |
|---|---|---|---|---|---|
1
| 1 | Krisse-Ly Kuldkepp | 30 | Interior Designer and Sales Assistant | Sundbyberg, Sweden | Married |
| 1 | Rasmus Hedenstedt | 32 | Self-Employed | Stockholm, Sweden | Married |
| 1 | Meira Omar | 30 | Economist | Malmö, Sweden | Married |
| 1 | Oskar Nordstrand | 32 | Financial Advisor | Stockholm, Sweden | Married |
| 1 | Amanda Jonegard | 34 | Economist | Stockholm, Sweden | Split after the wedding |
| 1 | Sergio Rincon | 38 | Soccer Coach and DJ | Barcelona, Spain | Split after the wedding |
| 1 | Emilia Holmqvist | 34 | Telecommunications Business Manager | Stockholm, Sweden | Split at the altar |
| 1 | Lucas Gustavsson | 30 | Energy Production Operative Manager | Stockholm, Sweden | Split at the altar |
| 1 | Catja Lövstrand | 32 | HR Specialist | Stockholm, Sweden | Split before the wedding |
| 1 | Christofer Pocock | 34 | Self-Employed | Järvsö, Sweden | Split before the wedding |
| 1 | Alexandra Davidsson | 33 | General Secretary | Stockholm, Sweden | Not engaged |
| 1 | Andrea Margareta | 36 | Gym Studio Owner | Sundsvall, Sweden | Not engaged |
| 1 | Isabelle Bergman | 27 | Assistant Nurse and Personal Assistant | Stockholm, Sweden | Not engaged |
| 1 | Johan Melin | 34 | Salesman | Kalmar, Sweden | Not engaged |
| 1 | Karolina Aless | 32 | Payroll Controller | Stockholm, Sweden | Not engaged |
| 1 | Kimia Cousarie | 34 | Cosmetic Nurse | Malmö, Sweden | Not engaged |
| 1 | Adde Tzelidis | 33 | VP of a Security Company | Undisclosed | Not engaged |
| 1 | Andreas Johansson | 39 | Firefighter | Undisclosed | Not engaged |
| 1 | Daniel Brodecki | 38 | Entrepreneur | Undisclosed | Not engaged |
| 1 | Huda Altaly | 30 | Assistant Nurse | Undisclosed | Not engaged |
| 1 | Jimmy Bysell | 34 | Self-Employed | Undisclosed | Not engaged |
| 1 | Johannes Frimodig | 32 | Project Manager | Undisclosed | Not engaged |
| 1 | Leila Khodiar | 35 | Recruiter | Undisclosed | Not engaged |
| 1 | Markus Grahn | 29 | Training Instruction Consultant | Undisclosed | Not engaged |
| 1 | Mow Johansson | 43 | Recruitment Consultant | Undisclosed | Not engaged |
| 1 | Milan Grubor | 28 | Car Salesman | Undisclosed | Not engaged |
| 1 | Mohamed Sherif | 32 | Personal Trainer | Undisclosed | Not engaged |
| 1 | Nea Jilken | 36 | Chief Advisor | Undisclosed | Not engaged |
| 1 | Nina Norss | 31 | Destination Manager and Artist | Undisclosed | Not engaged |
| 1 | Sami Mäkinen | 29 | Social Secretary | Undisclosed | Not engaged |
| 1 | Sandra Wigh | 36 | Yoga Teacher and Artist | Undisclosed | Not engaged |
| 1 | Victoria Wiklund | 36 | Resource Educator | Undisclosed | Not engaged |
2
| 2 | Karin Westerberg | 33 | Media project manager | Stockholm, Sweden | Married |
| 2 | Niklas Agild | 35 | Actor and golf salesperson | Stockholm, Sweden | Married |
| 2 | Nathalie Loveless | 26 | Content manager | Stockholm, Sweden | Married |
| 2 | Wictor Dörrich | 32 | Global investment controller | Gothenburg, Sweden | Married |
| 2 | Karolina Finskas | 38 | Digital marketing student | Stockholm, Sweden | Split after the wedding |
| 2 | Jakob Grünberg | 34 | Chief marketing officer | Gothenburg, Sweden | Split after the wedding |
| 2 | Alicia Sjöberg | 31 | Recruiter | Stockholm, Sweden | Split before the wedding |
| 2 | Oscar Lind | 29 | Technical sales | Gothenburg, Sweden | Split before the wedding |
| 2 | Milly Carlsson | 32 | Event manager | Halmstad, Sweden | Split before the wedding |
| 2 | Ola Jönsson | 42 | Real estate consultant | Stockholm, Sweden | Split before the wedding |
| 2 | Nora Norin | 33 | PE teacher | Stockholm, Sweden | Not engaged |
| 2 | Yenie Lundbeck | 33 | Preschool teacher | Östersund, Sweden | Not engaged |
| 2 | Alexander Blom | 30 | Financial advisor | Undisclosed | Not engaged |
| 2 | Amanda Westin | 27 | Fashion sales manager | Undisclosed | Not engaged |
| 2 | Anna Andersson | 34 | Middle school teacher | Undisclosed | Not engaged |
| 2 | Christian Gharib | 32 | Payroll consultant | Undisclosed | Not engaged |
| 2 | Eddie Gustafsson | 35 | Bank analyst | Undisclosed | Not engaged |
| 2 | Emmelie Abrahamsson | 33 | Accounting assistant | Undisclosed | Not engaged |
| 2 | Gaby Kepinski | 35 | Self-employed marketing consultant | Undisclosed | Not engaged |
| 2 | Germaine | 26 | Technical support | Undisclosed | Not engaged |
| 2 | Gustav Dolk | 29 | Gym area manager | Undisclosed | Not engaged |
| 2 | Ibbe | 34 | Event project manager | Undisclosed | Not engaged |
| 2 | Isabella Winth | 31 | Artist & Marketing Specialist | Undisclosed | Not engaged |
| 2 | Julia Gustafson Berg | 32 | Event project manager | Undisclosed | Not engaged |
| 2 | John | 28 | HR sales consultant | Undisclosed | Not engaged |
| 2 | Mikael Valdivia Diaz | 28 | Web editor | Undisclosed | Not engaged |
| 2 | Nicke Oscarsson | 25 | Economic advisor | Undisclosed | Not engaged |
| 2 | Olle Lindholm | 35 | Film editor | Undisclosed | Not engaged |
| 2 | Tim Hansson | 33 | Real estate student | Undisclosed | Not engaged |
| 2 | Tindra | 30 | Tattoo artist | Undisclosed | Not engaged |
3
| 3 | Aniela | 30 | A&R Record Label | Stockholm, Sweden | Married |
| 3 | Ibrahim | 33 | Surgeon | Jönköping | Married |
| 3 | Angelica | 30 | Mortgage Advisor | Stockholm, Sweden | Split before the wedding |
| 3 | Aron | 36 | Sports Consultant | Stockholm, Sweden | Split before the wedding |
| 3 | Ronja | 36 | Regional Sales Manager | Stockholm, Sweden | Split before the wedding |
| 3 | Lars-Erik | 35 | Youth Care Practitioner | Stockholm, Sweden | Split before the wedding |
| 3 | Camilla | 33 | Managing Partner | Stockholm, Sweden | Split before the wedding |
| 3 | Ludwig | 31 | Docker | Strängnäs, Sweden | Split before the wedding |
| 3 | Johanna | 38 | Sales and Event Manager | Sydney, Australia | Split before the wedding |
| 3 | Daniel | 43 | IT Sales | Norrköping, Sweden | Split before the wedding |
| 3 | Affe | 39 | Finance Manager | Stockholm, Sweden | Not engaged |
| 3 | Agnes | 31 | Elementary School Teacher | Köping, Sweden | Not engaged |
| 3 | Amelia | 33 | Psychiatric Nurse | Stockholm, Sweden | Not engaged |
| 3 | Anna | 39 | HR Specialist | Stockholm, Sweden | Not engaged |
| 3 | Christofer | 43 | Marketing Consultant | Stockholm, Sweden | Not engaged |
| 3 | Danette | 28 | HR Maager | Gothenburg, Sweden | Not engaged |
| 3 | Ellen | 28 | Stylist | Stockholm, Sweden | Not engaged |
| 3 | Fabian | 37 | Nursing Assistant | Stockholm, Sweden | Not engaged |
| 3 | Gabriel | 33 | Actor | Örebro, Sweden | Not engaged |
| 3 | Haitham | 32 | Business Analyst | Stockholm, Sweden | Not engaged |
| 3 | Hanna | 30 | Songwriter | Stockholm, Sweden | Not engaged |
| 3 | Ida | 33 | Medical Coordinator | Linköping, Sweden | Not engaged |
| 3 | Jacqueline | 30 | Relationship Coach | Kållered, Sweden | Not engaged |
| 3 | Jessica | 33 | Marketing Manager | Stockholm, Sweden | Not engaged |
| 3 | Joel | 31 | Middle School Teacher | Stockholm, Sweden | Not engaged |
| 3 | Leena | 38 | HR Business Partner | Stockholm, Sweden | Not engaged |
| 3 | Olof | 29 | Carpenter | Markaryd, Sweden | Not engaged |
| 3 | Per | 41 | Civil Engineer | Karlstad, Sweden | Not engaged |

== Post filming ==
| Season | Couples | Married | Still together | Status |
|---|---|---|---|---|
1
| 1 | Krisse-Ly and Rasmus | Yes | Yes | Krisse-Ly and Rasmus got married in 2023. They welcomed their first child, Kelian, on January 22, 2025. |
| 1 | Meira and Oskar | Yes | Yes | Meira and Oskar got married in 2023. |
| 1 | Amanda and Sergio | Yes | No | Amanda and Sergio got married in 2023. They welcomed their first child, Ralf, on 6 May 2024. They welcomed their second child, Hugo, on 2 July 2025. On April 13, 2026, it was announced that had Amanda filed for divorce from Sergio. |
| 1 | Emilia and Lucas | No | No | After leaving the pods, Lucas struggled to feel physically attracted to Emilia. At the altar, Emilia said yes, however, Lucas did not feel the same and said no based on his "gut feeling" at the altar. The couple dated briefly after the wedding but broke up two weeks later. |
| 1 | Catja and Christofer | No | No | The couple split up after a series of arguments regarding an alleged lack of attraction. Catja believed she showed love with her body, but Christofer was unable to feel it and accused her of misusing her body. After a particularly terrible fight, Catja removed her engagement ring and left for the night to collect her thoughts. The couple officially broke up the next day after Christofer threw his ring into the sea. |
2
| 2 | Karin and Niklas | Yes | Yes | Karin and Niklas got married in 2024. They welcomed their first child, Lill, on April 11, 2025. |
| 2 | Nathalie and Wictor | Yes | Yes | Nathalie and Wictor got married in 2024. In October 2025, the couple announced that they are expecting their first child, due in April 2026. |
| 2 | Karolina and Jakob | Yes | No | Karolina and Jakob got married in 2024. In February 2026, they shared that they had decided to file for divorce. |
| 2 | Alicia and Oscar | No | No | They split up before the wedding. During their time living together, the couple realised they had some significant differences. Oscar expressed a need for personal space during conflicts, often becoming distant, which contrasted with Alicia's desire for closeness and reassurance. Alicia found it challenging to read Oscar's emotions and, as such, felt uncertain about his feelings toward her. Additionally, their differing approaches to daily planning and social activities led to further strain. |
| 2 | Milly and Ola | No | No | They split up at their engagement party as Ola believed they were not right for each other. He admitted to struggling with Milly’s short hair and aspects of her lifestyle, which made her feel criticised. She, in turn, questioned whether Ola was truly ready for commitment or if he had joined the experiment for self-discovery. Feeling that he didn’t consider her enough in his daily life, she grew doubtful. |
3
| 3 | Aniela and Ibrahim | Yes | Yes | Aniela and Ibrahim got married in 2025. At the reunion, they announced they were expecting a baby girl in May 2026. |
| 3 | Angelica and Aron | No | No | They did not get married as Angelica called off the relationship on the morning of their wedding day due to their emotional connection fading. At the reunion, she elaborated on this, saying she had a "gut feeling that he wasn't right" for her since the bachelorette party. |
| 3 | Ronja and Lars-Erik | No | No | They split up shortly after the apartment stage of the experiment began due to behavioural incompatibility and differences in faith. |
| 3 | Camilla and Ludwig | No | No | They split up as Ludwig wished for more physical affection than Camilla was ready to give at the time. |
| 3 | Johanna and Daniel | No | No | They split up due to an inability to see eye to eye which resulted in trust issues and communication problems. |
