= List of Love Is Blind: Sweden episodes =

The following is a list of episodes from Love Is Blind: Sweden, a Swedish dating reality television programme produced by Mastiff that first aired on Netflix in January 2024.

== Series overview ==
Season	Episodes	Originally released	
Season	Episodes	First released	Last released
1	12	January 12, 2024	March 6, 2025
2	10	March 14, 2025	April 3, 2025
3	13	March 12, 2026	March 26, 2026

== Episodes ==
=== Season 1 (2024) ===
Love Is Blind: Sweden season 1 episodes
No. overall	No. in season	Title	Original release date
Week 1
1	1	"The Pods Are Now Open"	January 12, 2024
2	2	"Will You Marry Me?"	January 12, 2024
3	3	"First Night Together"	January 12, 2024
4	4	"Physical Attraction"	January 12, 2024
Week 2
5	5	"Time to Move In Together"	January 19, 2024
6	6	"The Bad Boy Always Wins"	January 19, 2024
7	7	"Waking Up Alone"	January 19, 2024
8	8	"Is It True Love"	January 19, 2024
Week 3
9	9	"The Weddings"	January 26, 2024
Special
10	10	"The Reunion"	January 28, 2024
After the Altar
11	11	"One Year Later"	March 6, 2025
12	12	"Crayfishparty and Confrontation"	March 6, 2025

=== Season 2 (2025) ===
Love Is Blind: Sweden season 1 episodes
No. overall	No. in season	Title	Original release date
Week 1
13	1	"I Have Met My Wife!"	March 14, 2025
14	2	"Please, Marry Me!"	March 14, 2025
15	3	"I'm Not Wearing Panties"	March 14, 2025
16	4	"Just Want to Escape"	March 14, 2025
Week 2
17	5	"Reality Catches Up"	March 20, 2025
18	6	"Her Goal Is to Destroy Us"	March 20, 2025
19	7	"I Need a Break"	March 20, 2025
Week 3
20	8	"Afraid of Getting Hurt"	March 27, 2025
21	9	"The Weddings: Is Love Truly Blind?"	March 27, 2025
Special
22	10	"The Reunion"	April 3, 2025

=== Season 3 (2026) ===
Love Is Blind: Sweden season 3 episodes
No. overall	No. in season	Title	Original release date
Week 1
23	1	"Is Love Blind?"	March 12, 2026
24	2	"I Just Want to Eat You Up!"	March 12, 2026
25	3	"The Most Important Decision in My Life"	March 12, 2026
26	4	"Love Bombing"	March 12, 2026
Week 2
27	5	"An Engagement Ring, Not a Leg Spreader"	March 19, 2026
28	6	"What If I Say No?"	March 19, 2026
29	7	"Everything's Gone in a Second"	March 19, 2026
Week 3
30	8	"Scary But Obvious"	March 26, 2026
31	9	"Love Is a Decision"	March 26, 2026
Special
32	10	"The Reunion"	April 2, 2026
Reactions
33	11	"The Pods are Now Open!"	March 12, 2026
34	12	"Living Together"	March 19, 2026
35	13	"Love is a Decision"	March 26, 2026
