= Love Is Blind: Japan =

Japanese dating reality TV show

- Genre: Reality
- Created by: Chris Coelen
- Presented by: Takashi Fujii; Yuka Itaya
- Country of origin: Japan
- Original language: Japanese
- No. of seasons: 1
- No. of episodes: 11

Production
- Running time: 47–71 minutes
- Production company: TV Man Union

Original release
- Network: Netflix
- Release: February 8 – February 22, 2022

Related
- Love Is Blind

Love is Blind: Japan is a Japanese reality television series based on the American show by the same name hosted by Takashi Fujii and Yuka Itaya which premiered on Netflix on February 8, 2022, as a three-week event. Although a second season was greenlit on March 24, 2022, it was later revealed on October 13, 2022, that it had been canceled.

== Season summary ==
Couples	Married	Still together	Relationship notes
Motomi and Ryotaro	Yes	Yes	Motomi and Ryotaro got married and had a son in April 2023.
Midori and Wataru	Yes	Yes	Midori and Wataru got married and had a daughter in January 2023.
Ayano and Shuntaro	No	No	They did not get married because Shuntaro said no at the altar due to communication issues between the couple.
Kaoru and Misaki	No	No	They split up because Kaoru felt that Misaki was not interested in getting to know her.
Nana and Yudai	No	No	They split up once Nana learned that Yudai has not been "completely truthful" to her about many of his personal stances.
Minami and Mori	No	No	They split up after a series of "tearful arguments and hours-long discussions".
Nanako and Odacchi	No	No	They split early on in the show after Nanako complained that Odacchi was "more focused on his work" than their relationship.
Priyanka and Mizuki	No	No	They split up shortly after the post-pod honeymoons due to Mizuki having lied about owning the company he worked at, despite only being an employee there.

== Participants ==
Name	Age	Occupation	Relationship status
Ryotaro	32	Hairstylist	Married
Motomi	27	Advertising Salesperson	Married
Wataru	38	Executive	Married
Midori	30	Business Planner	Married
Ayano	30	Corporate Worker	Split at the wedding
Shuntaro	56	Consultant	Split at the wedding
Kaoru	31	Singer-Songwriter	Split before the wedding
Misaki	31	Baseball Coach	Split before the wedding
Nana	31	Online Marketer	Split before the wedding
Yudai	23	Men's Hairstylist	Split before the wedding
Minami	26	Architect	Split before the wedding
Mori	37	Cosmetic Dermatologist	Split before the wedding
Nanako	35	Ex-Ballet Instructor	Split before the wedding
Odacchi	31	Comedian	Split before the wedding
Priyanka	27	Entrepreneur	Split before the wedding
Mizuki	29	Restaurateur	Split before the wedding
Takumi	23	Ex-Maritime Self-Defense Force Officer	Not engaged
Jinya	26	Hair and Makeup Stylist	Not engaged
Atsushi	42	Business Owner	Not engaged
Sho	28	Design Firm Owner	Not engaged
Ryoga	30	Real Estate Agent	Not engaged
Toshie	39	Aromatherapy Instructor	Not engaged
Eri	32	Fitness Trainer	Not engaged
Maki	34	Yoga Instructor	Not engaged

== Episodes ==
Love Is Blind: Japan season 1 episodes
No.	Title	Original release date
Week 1
1	"Falling in Love... Through a Wall"	February 8, 2022
2	"Nice to Meet You, My Beloved"	February 8, 2022
3	"Labyrinth of Love"	February 8, 2022
4	"That's When You Moved My Heart"	February 8, 2022
5	"Just the Two of Us"	February 8, 2022
Week 2
6	"Endings and Beginnings"	February 15, 2022
7	"The Cohabitation Test"	February 15, 2022
8	"Once More on One Knee"	February 15, 2022
9	"An Ill-Fitting Dress"	February 15, 2022
Week 3
10	"Countdown to "I Do""	February 22, 2022
11	"Decision Time"	February 22, 2022

== See also ==
- Sexy Beasts, a dating program on Netflix with a similar premise of disguising contestants' looks with prosthetics and make-up.
- Married at First Sight, a dating program on Peacock where participants marry strangers for a period of eight to ten weeks before they must choose to divorce or stay married.
- Perfect Match, a dating program where former dating reality television contestants pair up and compete in challenges as they aim to become the most compatible match.
