= List of Love is Blind: Germany participants =

The following is a list of individuals who have appeared on Love Is Blind: Germany, a reality television series by Netflix.

== Participants ==
Season	Name	Age	Occupation	Hometown	Result
1
1	Alina Rothbauer	28	Account Manager	Eglharting, Germany	Married
1	Ilias Pappas	27	Real Estate Agent	Ascheberg, Germany	Married
1	Hanni Hase	28	Real Estate Agent	Cologne, Germany	Split at the altar
1	Daniel Rocco	26	Business Consultant	Frankfurt, Germany	Split at the altar
1	Sally Osei	27	Marketing Manager	Berlin, Germany	Split at the altar
1	Medina	31	Quality Assurance and Training Specialist	Berlin, Germany	Split at the altar
1	Shila Hemati	36	Real Estate Agent	Cologne, Germany	Split before the wedding
1	Tolga	34	Insurance Agent	Kehl, Germany	Split before the wedding
1	Jennifer Zengel	31	Health Manager	Berlin, Germany	Split before the wedding
1	Marcel Braun	36	Marketing Manager	Cologne, Germany	Split before the wedding
1	Shella Oire	29	University Student & Model	Düsseldorf, Germany	Split before the wedding
1	Pascal	33	IT-Project Manager	Peißenberg, Germany	Split before the wedding
1	Fabio	33	Flight Service Advisor	Remseck, Germany	Not engaged
1	Alberta	27	University Student	Essen, Germany	Not engaged
1	Hannah	29	Social Media Manager	Berlin, Germany	Not engaged
1	Rafael	26	Dance Instructor	Undisclosed	Not engaged
2
2	Jessi	32	Sales Manager	Undisclosed	Married
2	Konstantin Streifling	36	Event Manager	Cologne, Germany	Married
2	Gunnar	33	IT Consultant	Berlin, Germany	Married
2	Josy	29	HR Specialist	Undisclosed	Married
2	Andi Winck	42	Investment Banker	Cologne, Germany	Split at the altar
2	Yasmin	30	IT Consultant	Frankfurt, Germany	Split at the altar
2	Jubriel	28	Store Manager	Undisclosed	Split before the wedding
2	Wandi	28	HR Manager	Undisclosed	Split before the wedding
2	Loan Laurent	26	HR Manager	Undisclosed	Split before the wedding
2	Jan	27	Law Student	Undisclosed	Split before the wedding
2	Anastasija	25	Communications Specialist	Undisclosed	Not engaged
2	Andrea	31	Registered Nurse	Undisclosed	Not engaged
2	Bri	32	Medical Spa Studio Manager	Undisclosed	Not engaged
2	Celia	31	Wholesale Food Buyer	Undisclosed	Not engaged
2	Ceren	35	Marketing Manager	Undisclosed	Not engaged
2	Ellen	31	Early Childhood Educator	Undisclosed	Not engaged
2	Nadja Nero	33	Fitness Studio Founder	Undisclosed	Not engaged
2	Simone	31	Software Designer	Undisclosed	Not engaged
2	Sonia	35	Social Worker	Undisclosed	Not engaged
2	Tanja	31	HR Manager	Undisclosed	Not engaged
2	Andreas	38	Online Retail Entrepreneur	Undisclosed	Not engaged
2	Daniel	38	E-Commerce Entrepreneur	Undisclosed	Not engaged
2	Dennis	30	Real Estate Agent	Undisclosed	Not engaged
2	Dustin	30	High School Teacher	Undisclosed	Not engaged
2	Niklas	28	Account Manager	Undisclosed	Not engaged
2	Nils	36	Regional Insurance Manager	Undisclosed	Not engaged
2	Philipp	31	Registered Nurse	Undisclosed	Not engaged
2	Sky	35	Project Planner	Undisclosed	Not engaged
2	Slei	32	Fitness Coach	Undisclosed	Not engaged
2	Tobias	30	Web Producer and Songwriter	Undisclosed	Not engaged
