= Members Only =

Members Only or Members only may refer to:

== Businesses and organizations ==
- Members Only (fashion brand)
- Members only club
- Members-only unionism

== Music ==
=== Performers ===
- Members Only (band), an American jazz-funk band
- Members Only (hip hop collective), an American hip hop group

=== Songs ===
- "Members Only", by Bobby Bland from album Members Only, 1985 (covered by Billy Joe Royal on The Royal Treatment, 1987)
- "Members Only", by Dame D.O.L.L.A. from Confirmed, 2017
- "Members Only", by Drake from For All the Dogs, 2023
- "Members Only", by Gucci Mane from Mr. Davis, 2017
- "Members Only", by Nothing but Thieves from Dead Club City, 2023
- "Members Only", by Sheryl Crow from The Globe Sessions, 1998
- "Members Only", by Swollen Members from Monsters in the Closet, 2002

=== Albums ===
- Members Only, by Bobby Bland, 1985

== Television ==
- Members Only: Palm Beach, a 2025 American reality show
- Members Only (TV series), a 2010s unaired American comedy-drama series
- "Members Only" (South Park), a 2016 episode
- "Members Only" (The Sopranos), a 2006 episode
- "Members Only" (That's So Raven), a 2006 episode

== See also ==
- For Members Only, a 1963 album by Shirley Scott
- Fight Club: Members Only, a 2006 Indian film by Vikram Chopra
