= Love Is Blind: Mexico =

2024 Netflix reality series

- Genre: Reality
- Created by: Chris Coelen
- Presented by: Omar Chaparro; Lucy Chaparro
- Country of origin: Mexico
- Original language: Spanish
- No. of seasons: 1
- No. of episodes: 11

Production
- Executive producers: Coty Cagliolo; Johanna Helman; Martin Solmesky
- Running time: 46-75 minutes
- Production company: Fremantle

Original release
- Network: Netflix
- Release: August 1, 2024 – present

Related
- Love Is Blind

Love Is Blind: Mexico is a Mexican reality television series based on the American show by the same name, hosted by the Mexican celebrity couple Omar Chaparro and Lucy Chaparro which premiered on Netflix on August 1, 2024, as part of a three-week event. The reunion episode aired on August 18, 2024.

== Season summary ==
| Couples | Married | Still together | Relationship notes |
|---|---|---|---|
| Karen and Fernando | Yes | No | Karen and Fernando got married. At the reunion, they announced that they were still together, have started a business and bought a house. On 2 July 2026, Karen revealed on her Instagram that the two were no longer together. |
| Silvia and Chema | No | No | Silvia and Chema both said no at the altar, but chose to continue dating after. They did, however, announce their decision to part ways and focus on other priorities in their life soon after the show aired. |
| Leti and Saul | No | No | They split after returning home from the retreat. Leti was reluctant to be intimate and the couple had problems communicating. |
| Fernanda and Gerardo | No | No | They both led very different lifestyles which put a strain on their relationship. Before their wedding, Gerardo expressed concerns about marriage which upset Fernanda ultimately led to them breaking up. |
| Irais and Rene | No | No | They met in person before becoming engaged. Irais expressed doubts and, as such, the couple initially decided not to go on the retreat. They eventually got back together and joined the other couples in Tulum, before breaking up again due their different lifestyles and locations making the relationship difficult to maintain. |
| Francesca and Willy | No | No | They started strong, but Willy's communication style worried Francesca and eventually led to her deciding that they were not a good match. Part of the reason behind this was that they had differing financial and lifestyle approaches. They are still amicable but are no longer together. |

== Participants ==
Participants from the first season were revealed a few days before the episode.

| Name | Age | Occupation | Relationship Status |
|---|---|---|---|
| Karen Torales | 27 | Financial Advisor | Married |
| Fernando Hernandez | 27 | Operations Manager | Married |
| Irais Ramirez | 30 | Attorney | Split at the wedding |
| Rene Angeles | 34 | Doctor | Split at the wedding |
| Silvia Delgado | 30 | Model | Split at the wedding |
| Chema Rivera | 36 | Entrepreneur and Professional Poker Player | Split at the wedding |
| Francesca Oettler | 27 | Indoor Cycling Coach | Split at the wedding |
| Willy Salomon | 34 | Advertising Salesman | Split at the wedding |
| Fernanda Riva Palacio | 36 | Architect | Split before the wedding |
| Gerardo Zapiain | 33 | Musician | Split before the wedding |
| Luis Fer Campos | 28 | Entrepreneur and Creative Director | Not engaged |
| Mafer Trujillo | 29 | Marketing Director | Not engaged |
| Rocio Mirafuentes | 36 | Human Development Professor | Not engaged |
| Pamela Torrens | 26 | Entrepreneur | Not engaged |
| Alejandra Caletti | 28 | Opera Singer | Not engaged |
| Daniel Behar | 33 | DJ and Entrepreneur | Not engaged |
| Saul Reyes | 35 | Aviation Company Manager | Not engaged |
| Leticia Floresmeyer | 35 | Communications Specialist | Not engaged |

== Episodes ==
Love Is Blind: Mexico season 1 episodes
| No. | Title | Original release date |
|---|---|---|
Week 1
| 1 | "The Experiment Begins" | August 1, 2024 |
| 2 | "Love, and Betrayal?" | August 1, 2024 |
| 3 | "The First Night Together" | August 1, 2024 |
| 4 | "It's Not All Roses" | August 1, 2024 |
Week 2
| 5 | "Living Together" | August 8, 2024 |
| 6 | "An Explosive Return" | August 8, 2024 |
| 7 | "Family or Love?" | August 8, 2024 |
| 8 | "Cold Feet" | August 8, 2024 |
Week 3
| 9 | "Bachelor and Bachelorette Parties" | August 15, 2024 |
| 10 | "Is Love Really Blind?" | August 15, 2024 |
Special
| 11 | "The Reunion" | August 18, 2024 |

== See also ==
- Sexy Beasts, a dating program on Netflix with a similar premise of disguising contestants' looks with prosthetics and make-up.
- Married at First Sight, a dating program on Peacock where participants marry strangers for a period of eight to ten weeks before they must choose to divorce or stay married.
- Perfect Match, a dating program where former dating reality television contestants pair up and compete in challenges as they aim to become the most compatible match.
