= Love Is Blind: Sweden season 3 =

2026 Netflix reality series

Love Is Blind: Sweden
- Season 2
- Presented by: Jessica Almenäs
- No. of episodes: 10

Release
- Original network: Netflix
- Original release: March 12 – April 2, 2026

Season chronology
- ← Previous; Season 2

The third season of Love Is Blind: Sweden premiered on Netflix from March 12, 2026 to March 26, 2026, as a three-week event hosted by Jessica Almenäs. The reunion episode aired in April 2026. The format for the show was slightly altered, with an additional "reaction" episode dropped each week. These featured six influencers talking about the on-screen drama that occurred in that instalment.

== Season summary ==
Couples	Married	Still together	Relationship notes
Aniela and Ibrahim	Yes	Yes	Aniela and Ibrahim got married in 2025. At the reunion, they announced they were expecting a baby girl in May 2026.
Angelica and Aron	No	No	They did not get married as Angelica called off the relationship on the morning of their wedding day due to their emotional connection fading. At the reunion, she elaborated on this, saying she had a "gut feeling that he wasn't right" for her since the bachelorette party.
Ronja and Lars-Erik	No	No	They split up shortly after the apartment stage of the experiment began due to behavioural incompatibility and differences in faith.
Camilla and Ludwig	No	No	They split up as Ludwig wished for more physical affection than Camilla was ready to give at the time.
Johanna and Daniel	No	No	They split up due to an inability to see eye to eye which resulted in trust issues and communication problems.

== Participants ==
Participants for this season were revealed on February 19, 2026.

Name	Age	Occupation	Hometown	Relationship Status
Aniela	30	A&R Record Label	Stockholm, Sweden	Married
Ibrahim	33	Surgeon	Jönköping	Married
Angelica	30	Mortgage Advisor	Stockholm, Sweden	Split before the wedding
Aron	36	Sports Consultant	Stockholm, Sweden	Split before the wedding
Ronja	36	Regional Sales Manager	Stockholm, Sweden	Split before the wedding
Lars-Erik	35	Youth Care Practitioner	Stockholm, Sweden	Split before the wedding
Camilla	33	Managing Partner	Stockholm, Sweden	Split before the wedding
Ludwig	31	Docker	Strängnäs, Sweden	Split before the wedding
Johanna	38	Sales and Event Manager	Sydney, Australia	Split before the wedding
Daniel	43	IT Sales	Norrköping, Sweden	Split before the wedding
Affe	39	Finance Manager	Stockholm, Sweden	Not Engaged
Agnes	31	Elementary School Teacher	Köping, Sweden	Not Engaged
Amelia	33	Psychiatric Nurse	Stockholm, Sweden	Not Engaged
Anna	39	HR Specialist	Stockholm, Sweden	Not Engaged
Christofer	43	Marketing Consultant	Stockholm, Sweden	Not Engaged
Danette	28	HR Maager	Gothenburg, Sweden	Not Engaged
Ellen	28	Stylist	Stockholm, Sweden	Not Engaged
Fabian	37	Nursing Assistant	Stockholm, Sweden	Not Engaged
Gabriel	33	Actor	Örebro, Sweden	Not Engaged
Haitham	32	Business Analyst	Stockholm, Sweden	Not Engaged
Hanna	30	Songwriter	Stockholm, Sweden	Not Engaged
Ida	33	Medical Coordinator	Linköping, Sweden	Not Engaged
Jacqueline	30	Relationship Coach	Kållered, Sweden	Not Engaged
Jessica	33	Marketing Manager	Stockholm, Sweden	Not Engaged
Joel	31	Middle School Teacher	Stockholm, Sweden	Not Engaged
Leena	38	HR Business Partner	Stockholm, Sweden	Not Engaged
Olof	29	Carpenter	Markaryd, Sweden	Not Engaged
Per	41	Civil Engineer	Karlstad, Sweden	Not Engaged

== Episodes ==
Love Is Blind: Sweden season 3 episodes
No. overall	No. in season	Title	Original release date
Week 1
23	1	"Is Love Blind?"	March 12, 2026
24	2	"I Just Want to Eat You Up!"	March 12, 2026
25	3	"The Most Important Decision in My Life"	March 12, 2026
26	4	"Love Bombing"	March 12, 2026
Week 2
27	5	"An Engagement Ring, Not a Leg Spreader"	March 19, 2026
28	6	"What If I Say No?"	March 19, 2026
29	7	"Everything's Gone in a Second"	March 19, 2026
Week 3
30	8	"Scary But Obvious"	March 26, 2026
31	9	"Love Is a Decision"	March 26, 2026
Special
32	10	"The Reunion"	April 2, 2026
Reactions
33	11	"The Pods are Now Open!"	March 12, 2026
34	12	"Living Together"	March 19, 2026
35	13	"Love is a Decision"	March 26, 2026
