= Love Is Blind: Habibi =

2024 Netflix reality series

- Genre: Reality
- Created by: Chris Coelen
- Presented by: Khaled Saqer; Eham Ali
- Countries of origin: United Arab Emirates; Lebanon
- Original language: Arabic
- No. of seasons: 2
- No. of episodes: 10

Production
- Executive producer: Rima Ghosn
- Running time: 46-63 minutes
- Production company: Netflix Studios

Original release
- Network: Netflix
- Release: October 10, 2024 – present

Related
- Love Is Blind

Love Is Blind: Habibi is a reality television series hosted by Khaled Saqer and Elham Ali based on the American show by the same name. It follows singles from multiple Arab states with the majority now living and working in the United Arab Emirates. The first season premiered on Netflix on October 10, 2024. A reunion episode was released on November 1, 2024.

== Season summary ==
Couples	Married	Still together	Relationship notes
Safa and Mohammad	Yes	Yes	Safa and Mohammad got married in 2024. At the reunion, filmed one year later, it was revealed that they were still together and living with each other. In September 2025, they announced that they were expecting their first child in 2026.
Dounia and Chafic	No	No	During the marriage ceremony, they announced a mutual decision that they need more to time together before agreeing to marriage. At the reunion, it was revealed that were dating each other again. They were briefly engaged in November 2024, but by April 2025, the couple announced that they had broken up.
Asma and Khatab	No	No	They did not get married, as Asma did not have her family's blessings. She reassured Khatab that she remained committed to the relationship but needed time to convince her relatives. At the reunion, it was announced that they continued dating for two months after filming before eventually breaking up.
Hajar and Simo	No	No	They split during the retreat. Simo had a fight with Chafic and left the morning after because Hajar did not support him during the fight. At the reunion, Hajar reproached him the way he used her words against her.
Karma and Ammar	No	No	They split before the wedding due to differences in career aspirations. Ammar did not support Karma's hobby (dancing) as he believe it was an unacceptable thing to do in their society. At the reunion, Karma told him that it was double-standard since he didn’t mind appearing shirtless multiple times during the show.
Nour and Mido	No	No	They split during the retreat due to a clash in personalities. At the reunion, Mido revealed that he regretted proposing due to their incompatibility. He also apologised for being disrespectful towards her during their many fights following their break-up.

== Participants ==
The participants were announced on 5 October 2024.

Name	Age	Occupation	Hometown	Relationship Status
Mohammed Alkiswani	36	Marketing and Brand Manager	Jordan	Married
Safa Al Jibori	38	Financial Manager	Iraq and Kuwait	Married
Asma Sami	34	Regional Marketing Manager	Egypt	Split at the altar
Khatab Hindi	32	DJ and Music Producer	Iraq	Split at the altar
Hajar Asli	29	Project Owner	Morocco	Split before the wedding
Mohamed "Simo" Nasrollah	34	Business Owner and Contractor	Morocco	Split before the wedding
Chafic Yactine	27	Entrepreneur	Lebanon	Split at the altar
Dounia Allbrahim	24	Content Creator	Morocco and Saudi Arabia	Split at the altar
Ammar Zam	32	Dentist	Syria	Split before the wedding
Karma Ben Messaoud	29	Business Owner	Tunisia	Split before the wedding
Mohamed "Mido" Gahed	39	Real Estate Agent	Egypt	Split before the wedding
Nour El Hajj	29	Model	Lebanon	Split before the wedding
Ali Alamm	35	Blogger	Bahrain	Not engaged
Al-Jawhara Ajaji	38	Lifestyle Influencer	Saudi Arabia	Not engaged
Karim Ibrahim	33	Executive Director	Lebanon	Not engaged
Rakan Alruwaily	33	Entrepreneur	Saudi Arabia	Not engaged
Rami Alwan	30	Sales Manager	Lebanon	Not engaged
Sara	35	Real Estate Agent	Algeria and Morocco	Not engaged
Shereen Abdulla	34	Entrepreneur	Bahrain	Not engaged
Yasmine DK	30	HR Manager and Life Coach	Tunisia	Not engaged

== Episodes ==
Love Is Blind: Habibi season 1 episodes
No.	Title	Original release date
1	"The Pods Are Open Habibi"	October 10, 2024
2	"It's Complicated"	October 10, 2024
3	"Surprise, Surprise!"	October 10, 2024
4	"Catching Up With Cupid"	October 10, 2024
5	"The Aftermath"	October 10, 2024
6	"Realityville"	October 10, 2024
7	"Family Matters"	October 10, 2024
8	"Almost There"	October 10, 2024
9	"Tying The Knot... Or Not?"	October 10, 2024
Special
10	"The Reunion"	November 1, 2024

== See also ==
- Sexy Beasts, a dating program on Netflix with a similar premise of disguising contestants' looks with prosthetics and make-up
- Married at First Sight, a dating program on Peacock where participants marry strangers for a period of eight to ten weeks before they must choose to divorce or stay married.
- Perfect Match, a dating program where former dating reality television contestants pair up and compete in challenges as they aim to become the most compatible match.
