= Love Is Blind: Germany =

2025 Netflix reality series

- Genre: Reality
- Created by: Chris Coelen
- Presented by: Stephanie Brungs; Christian Wackert
- Country of origin: Germany
- Original language: German
- No. of seasons: 2
- No. of episodes: 18

Production
- Executive producers: Christiane Heinemann; Anna-Lena Zwez
- Running time: 46-64 minutes
- Production company: RedSeven Entertainment

Original release
- Network: Netflix
- Release: January 3, 2025 – present

Related
- Love Is Blind

Love Is Blind: Germany is a German reality television series based on the American show by the same name. It was announced in 2023, and premiered on Netflix on January 3, 2025, as a three-week event. Stephanie Brungs and Chris Wackert-Brungs joined the show as hosts. It was renewed for a second season in January 2025 which was released on January 8, 2026, as a two-week event.

== Season summary ==
Couples	Married	Still Together	Relationship notes
Alina and Ilias	Yes	Yes	Alina and Ilias got married on 13 November 2023.
Hanni and Daniel	No	Yes	They did not get married after Hanni said "no" at the altar because she did not feel ready to get married. At the reunion, they announced that they were still together.
Sally and Medina	No	No	They split up temporarily after the reveal and, as such, did not go to Greece together. They later decided to give the relationship a try but end up breaking up at the altar.
Jennifer and Marcel	No	No	They split up before the wedding due to issues with communication.
Shila and Tolga	No	No	They split up before the wedding but decided to remain friends.
Shella and Pascal	No	No	They split up during the retreat in Greece as Pascal did not believe they had "enough of a spark" to pursue a marriage.

== Participants ==
The participants were announced on December 20, 2024.

Name	Age	Hometown	Relationship Status
Alina Rothbauer	28	Eglharting, Germany	Married
Ilias Pappas	27	Ascheberg, Germany	Married
Hanni Hase	28	Cologne, Germany	Split at the altar
Daniel Rocco	26	Frankfurt, Germany	Split at the altar
Sally Osei	27	Berlin, Germany	Split at the altar
Medina	31	Berlin, Germany	Split at the altar
Jennifer Zengel	31	Berlin, Germany	Split before the wedding
Marcel Braun	36	Cologne, Germany	Split before the wedding
Shella Oire	29	Düsseldorf, Germany	Split before the wedding
Pascal	33	Peißenberg, Germany	Split before the wedding
Shila Hemati	36	Cologne, Germany	Split before the wedding
Tolga	34	Kehl, Germany	Split before the wedding
Fabio	34	Remseck, Germany	Not engaged
Alberta	27	Essen, Germany	Not engaged
Hannah	29	Berlin, Germany	Not engaged

== Episodes ==
No. overall	No. in season	Title	Original release date
Week 1
1	1	"The Pods Are Open"	January 3, 2025
2	2	"Three Is One Too Many"	January 3, 2025
3	3	"All On One Card"	January 3, 2025
4	4	"Trouble In Paradise"	January 3, 2025
Week 2
5	5	"Decidedly Undecided"	January 10, 2025
6	6	"The Second Chance"	January 10, 2025
7	7	"Meet My Family"	January 10, 2025
8	8	"Cold Feet"	January 10, 2025
Week 3
9	9	"Anything Can Happen at the Altar"	January 17, 2025
Special
10	10	"The Reunion"	January 19, 2025

== Production ==
The show is produced by RedSeven Entertainment, a production firm of the German media company ProSiebenSat.1 Media. For the first season, the German adaptation reused the pods from Love Is Blind: Sweden. The retreat was located in Crete, Greece. The final stage, where the couples move in together, was filmed in Düsseldorf.

== See also ==
- Sexy Beasts, a dating program on Netflix with a similar premise of disguising contestants' looks with prosthetics and make-up.
- Married at First Sight, a dating program on Peacock where participants marry strangers for a period of eight to ten weeks before they must choose to divorce or stay married.
- Perfect Match, a dating program where former dating reality television contestants pair up and compete in challenges as they aim to become the most compatible match.
