= Love Is Blind: Poland =

2024 Netflix reality series

- Genre: Reality
- Created by: Chris Coelen
- Presented by: Zofia Zborowska-Wrona; Andrzej Wrona
- Country of origin: Poland
- Original language: Polish
- No. of seasons: 1

Production
- Executive producer: Julita Brutus
- Running time: 41–65 minutes
- Production company: Netflix Studios

Original release
- Network: Netflix
- Release: May 6, 2026 – present

Related
- Love Is Blind

Love Is Blind: Poland is a reality television series hosted by Zofia Zborowska-Wrona and Andrzej Wrona based on the American show of the same name. It follows singles from Poland and surrounding countries. The show was filmed in multiple locations Strängnäs, Greece and Warsaw. The first season premiered on Netflix on May 6, 2026.

== Season summary ==
| Couples | Married | Still together | Relationship notes |
|---|---|---|---|
| Daria and Filip | Yes | Yes | Daria and Filip got married. At the reunion, it was revealed that they are still together. |
| Marta and Damian | Yes | No | Marta and Damian got married. At the reunion, it was revealed that they are still together. After the reunion episode (July 2026) Damian informed that the pair split and are currently in a proces of getting divorce. |
| Julia and Kamil "Uno" | No | No | They did not get married after Julia said no at the altar. Kamil revealed that, if given the chance, he would have also said no. |
| Julita and Jacek | No | No | They did not get married as Julita said no at the altar. Afterwards, Jacek commented that he would have also said no if given the chance. |
| Malika and Krzysztof | No | No | They split up after Krzysztof cheated with Kinga, another contestant on the show. |

== Participants ==
Participants from the first season were revealed on 6 May, 2026.

| Name | Age | Occupation | Hometown | Relationship Status |
|---|---|---|---|---|
| Daria Rybak | 35 | Office Manager | Warsaw, Poland | Married |
| Filip Lenz | 31 | Flight Attendant | Warsaw, Poland | Married |
| Marta Frymer | 30 | Nail Technician | Warsaw, Poland | Married |
| Damian Gawron | 35 | Business Analyst | Warsaw, Poland | Married |
| Julita Gosel | 37 | Neurology Teacher | Warsaw, Poland | Split at the wedding |
| Jacek | 36 | Barber | Powiśle, Warsaw, Poland | Split at the wedding |
| Julia Marie | 27 | Podiatrist | Poland | Split at the wedding |
| Kamil "Uno" Michal Osiak | 33 | Senior Consultant | Stavanger, Norway | Split at the wedding |
| Malika L. | 29 | E-commerce Specialist | Kraków, Poland | Split before the wedding |
| Krzysztof Banaszek | 36 | Carpenter | Poland and Iceland | Split before the wedding |
| Aleksander | 32 | Chef | Unknown | Not engaged |
| Kamil Bugdol | 27 | Brokerage Account Manager | Unknown | Not engaged |
| "New" Filip | 31 | Drilling Engineer | Unknown | Not engaged |
| Lubicz | 33 | Concept Store Owner | Unknown | Not engaged |
| Marcin | 30 | Lawyer | Unknown | Not engaged |
| Mateusz | 32 | Team Leader | Unknown | Not engaged |
| MP | 27 | Graduate Student | Unknown | Not engaged |
| Radek | 26 | Sales Associate at a Language Schoole | Unknown | Not engaged |
| Robert | 33 | Director | Unknown | Not engaged |
| Gosia | 28 | Marketing Specialist | Unknown | Not engaged |
| Fabian | 33 | Civil Engineer | Unknown | Not engaged |
| Iza | 31 | Operating Client Manager | Unknown | Not engaged |
| Julka | 24 | Business Development Specialist | Unknown | Not engaged |
| Ewelina Kubicka | 30 | Eyelash Styling Instructor | Unknown | Not engaged |
| Wiktoria | 25 | Marketing Specilist | Unknown | Not engaged |
| Laura | 30 | Logistician | Unknown | Not engaged |
| Paulina | 30 | Event Organizer | Unknown | Not engaged |
| Nicole Grzaska | 28 | Hypnotherapist | Unknown | Not engaged |
| Kinga | 27 | Real Estate Agent | Unknown | Not engaged |
| Karolina | 30 | Training Specialist | Unknown | Not engaged |

== Episodes ==
Love Is Blind: Poland season 1 episodes
| No. | Title | Original release date |
|---|---|---|
Week 1
| 1 | "The Polish Pods Are Open" | May 6, 2026 |
| 2 | "A Broken Heart Times Two" | May 6, 2026 |
| 3 | "Love Quadrangle" | May 6, 2026 |
| 4 | "Handsome, But He's My Friend's Man" | May 6, 2026 |
| 5 | "Goodbye Paradise, Welcome Life" | May 6, 2026 |
Week 2
| 6 | "You Can Never Count on Men" | May 13, 2026 |
| 7 | "Knife In The Back" | May 13, 2026 |
| 8 | "Our Faces Have Subtitles" | May 13, 2026 |
| 9 | "Can You Stop Being Yourself?" | May 13, 2026 |
Special
| 10 | "The Reunion" | May 24, 2026 |

== See also ==
- Sexy Beasts, a dating program on Netflix with a similar premise of disguising contestants' looks with prosthetics and make-up
- Married at First Sight, a dating program on Peacock where participants marry strangers for a period of eight to ten weeks before they must choose to divorce or stay married.
- Perfect Match, a dating program where former dating reality television contestants pair up and compete in challenges as they aim to become the most compatible match.
