= Love Is Blind: Sweden season 2 =

2025 Netflix reality series

Love Is Blind: Sweden
- Season 2
- Presented by: Jessica Almenäs
- No. of episodes: 10

Release
- Original network: Netflix
- Original release: March 14 – March 27, 2025

Season chronology
- ← Previous; Season 1 Next → Season 3

The second season of Love Is Blind: Sweden premiered on Netflix from March 14, 2025 to March 27, 2025, as a three-week event hosted by Jessica Almenäs. The reunion episode aired in April 2025.

== Season summary ==
Couples	Married	Still together	Relationship notes
Karin and Niklas	Yes	Yes	Karin and Niklas got married in 2024. They welcomed their first child, Lill, on April 11, 2025.
Nathalie and Wictor	Yes	Yes	Nathalie and Wictor got married in 2024. In October 2025, the couple announced that they are expecting their first child, due in April 2026.
Karolina and Jakob	Yes	No	Karolina and Jakob got married in 2024. In February 2026, they shared that they had decided to file for divorce.
Alicia and Oscar	No	No	They split up before the wedding. During their time living together, the couple realised they had some significant differences. Oscar expressed a need for personal space during conflicts, often becoming distant, which contrasted with Alicia's desire for closeness and reassurance. Alicia found it challenging to read Oscar's emotions and, as such, felt uncertain about his feelings toward her. Additionally, their differing approaches to daily planning and social activities led to further strain.
Milly and Ola	No	No	They split up at their engagement party as Ola believed they were not right for each other. He admitted to struggling with Milly’s short hair and aspects of her lifestyle, which made her feel criticised. She, in turn, questioned whether Ola was truly ready for commitment or if he had joined the experiment for self-discovery. Feeling that he didn’t consider her enough in his daily life, she grew doubtful.

== Participants ==
Participants for this season were revealed on March 4, 2025.

Name	Age	Occupation	Hometown	Relationship Status
Karin Westerberg	33	Media project manager	Stockholm, Sweden	Married
Niklas Agild	35	Actor and golf salesperson	Stockholm, Sweden	Married
Nathalie Loveless	26	Content manager	Stockholm, Sweden	Married
Wictor Dörrich	32	Global investment controller	Gothenburg, Sweden	Married
Karolina Finskas	38	Digital marketing student	Stockholm, Sweden	Split after the wedding
Jakob Grünberg	34	Chief marketing officer	Gothenburg, Sweden	Split after the wedding
Alicia Sjöberg	31	Recruiter	Stockholm, Sweden	Split before the wedding
Oscar Lind	29	Technical sales	Gothenburg, Sweden	Split before the wedding
Milly Carlsson	32	Event manager	Halmstad, Sweden	Split before the wedding
Ola Jönsson	42	Real estate consultant	Stockholm, Sweden	Split before the wedding
Nora Norin	33	PE teacher	Stockholm, Sweden	Not engaged
Yenie Lundbeck	33	Preschool teacher	Östersund, Sweden	Not engaged
Alexander Blom	30	Financial advisor	Undisclosed	Not engaged
Amanda Westin	27	Fashion sales manager	Undisclosed	Not engaged
Anna Andersson	34	Middle school teacher	Undisclosed	Not engaged
Christian Gharib	32	Payroll consultant	Undisclosed	Not engaged
Eddie Gustafsson	35	Bank analyst	Undisclosed	Not engaged
Emmelie Abrahamsson	33	Accounting assistant	Undisclosed	Not engaged
Gaby Kepinski	35	Self-employed marketing consultant	Undisclosed	Not engaged
Germaine	26	Technical support	Undisclosed	Not engaged
Gustav Dolk	29	Gym area manager	Undisclosed	Not engaged
Ibbe	34	Event project manager	Undisclosed	Not engaged
Isabella Winth	31	Artist & Marketing Specialist	Undisclosed	Not engaged
Julia Gustafson Berg	32	Event project manager	Undisclosed	Not engaged
John	28	HR sales consultant	Undisclosed	Not engaged
Mikael Valdivia Diaz	28	Web editor	Undisclosed	Not engaged
Nicke Oscarsson	25	Economic advisor	Undisclosed	Not engaged
Olle Lindholm	35	Film editor	Undisclosed	Not engaged
Tim Hansson	33	Real estate student	Undisclosed	Not engaged
Tindra	30	Tattoo artist	Undisclosed	Not engaged

== Episodes ==
Love Is Blind: Sweden season 1 episodes
No. overall	No. in season	Title	Original release date
Week 1
13	1	"I Have Met My Wife!"	March 14, 2025
14	2	"Please, Marry Me!"	March 14, 2025
15	3	"I'm Not Wearing Panties"	March 14, 2025
16	4	"Just Want to Escape"	March 14, 2025
Week 2
17	5	"Reality Catches Up"	March 20, 2025
18	6	"Her Goal Is to Destroy Us"	March 20, 2025
19	7	"I Need a Break"	March 20, 2025
Week 3
20	8	"Afraid of Getting Hurt"	March 27, 2025
21	9	"The Weddings: Is Love Truly Blind?"	March 27, 2025
Special
22	10	"The Reunion"	April 3, 2025

== Unaired Engagements ==
Tindra and Mikael also became a couple in the pods but were not filmed afterwards, and their dates were not aired on the show. In March 2025, they told TV4 that they are living together but not engaged.
