= Bad Exorcist =

Polish adult animated comedy series

- Genre: Adult animation; Black comedy; Horror comedy
- Created by: Bartosz Walaszek
- Based on: The Exorcist by Bartosz Walaszek
- Written by: Bartosz Walaszek
- Directed by: Bartosz Walaszek
- Voices of: Bartosz Walaszek; Katarzyna Kralewska-Walaszek
- Composer: Bartosz Walaszek
- Country of origin: Poland
- Original language: Polish
- No. of seasons: 7
- No. of episodes: 91

Production
- Executive producers: Piotr Reisch; Dawid Klepadło
- Producer: Piotr Reisch
- Running time: 9–17 minutes
- Production company: SPInka Film Studio

Original release
- Network: Netflix
- Release: 3 December 2020 – present

Bad Exorcist (Polish: Bogdan Boner: Egzorcysta) is a Polish adult animated comedy series created by Bartosz Walaszek and produced by SPInka Film Studio. It follows Bogdan Boner, a self-taught exorcist for hire with a fondness for drink, and functions both as a parody of horror films and as a satire of Polish society.

== Production and release ==
The series was commissioned by Showmax and streamed on that service from 2017 until the platform ceased operating in Poland in 2019. Episodes were posted to SPInka's YouTube channel in early 2019, but the studio's channel was suspended after the uploads breached its existing agreement with Showmax.

In December 2019 Netflix took over Showmax's Polish productions, making the series available there alongside the drama Rojst. The first seasons appear under the original title Bogdan Boner: Egzorcysta. The series has since run to seven seasons. It was later released in English-language territories as Bad Exorcist.

Walaszek, previously the creator of the animated series Blok Ekipa, writes, directs, scores and voices the series.

== Reception ==
Polish critics have treated the series as deliberately crude comedy aimed at an established audience. Reviewing the second season for Spider's Web, a critic wrote that it was as coarse as Walaszek's other animations, which would suit his existing fans.

After the series was dubbed into Italian and added to Netflix's Italian catalogue, it drew criticism from Alberto Castaldini, a journalist and lecturer in Greek Catholic theology at Babeș-Bolyai University in Cluj, Romania, who wrote a critique of its first two seasons describing it as dangerous for younger viewers and filled with occult material. The criticism was reported in Poland by Wirtualna Polska in April 2023.
