= A Spy in the Blood =

2026 Paul Warner novel

- Cover of the 2026 Bonnier Books UK edition
- Author: Paul Warner
- Genre: Spy Fiction
- Publication date: January 29, 2026
- ISBN: 978-1-785-12994-0

A Spy in the Blood is a 2026 novel by Paul Warner.

It will be the first book in a series.

== Plot ==
The plot stars a retired MI6 spy named Mark Wolfe, as he is called back to find his daughter in Afghanistan after she goes missing during a mission.

== Reception ==
Financial Times called it an "impressive launch." The Times, in a review of it and other thriller books, said "Paul Warner's impressive debut wins the reader's trust with its nuanced depiction of character, brisk handling of the action and sure grasp of the cost to spies of a life of deception and betrayal."

== Television adaptation ==
In June 2026, a television adaptation of the novel was announced by Netflix, with A24 co-producing the series. Millie Bobby Brown and David Harbour lead the series as Rebecca and Matt Wolfe respectively, with Jack Thorne serving as writer and executive producer.
