= Love Is Blind: France =

2025 Netflix reality series

- French: Pour le Meilleur et à l'Aveugle
- Genre: Reality
- Created by: Chris Coelen
- Presented by: Teddy Riner; Luthna Plocus
- Country of origin: France
- Original language: French
- No. of seasons: 1
- No. of episodes: 10

Production
- Production company: ITV Studios

Original release
- Network: Netflix
- Release: September 10, 2025 – present

Related
- Love Is Blind

Love Is Blind: France (French: Pour le Meilleur et à l'Aveugle), also known as For Better and Blind, is a French reality television series based on the American show by the same name. It premiered on Netflix on 10 September 2025, as a three-week event, with Teddy Riner and Luthna Plocus as hosts.

== Season summary ==
Couples	Married	Still together	Relationship notes
Alexandre and Chloé	Yes	No	Alexandre and Chloé got married in 2024. At the reunion, they revealed that they had separated due to Alexandre's hesitation with expressing love.
Charles and Julie	Yes	No	Charles and Julie got married in 2024. At the reunion, they revealed that had broken up shortly after, after Charles ended their marriage over text message.
Thomas and Kim	No	No	They did not get married after Kim said no at the altar due to them being "too different".
Van-My and Sabrina	No	Unknown	They did not get married after Van-My said no at the altar. The status of their relationship, however, remains unclear after the reunion.
Yannick and Tatiana	No	No	They split up before they wedding due to several disputes, including Tatiana refusing to sign a prenup.
Jonathan and Cynthia	No	No	They split up shortly in Morocco because Jonathan did not like the height difference between them or the fact that Cynthia did not put herself in his place.

== Participants ==
The participants were announced on August 31, 2025.

Name	Age	Occupation	Relationship Status
Chloé Le Trung	32	Physiotherapist	Married
Alexandre Baud	36	IT Manager	Married
Julie May	34	Event Project Manager	Married
Charles Marsigny	37	Entrepreneur	Married
Kim Musano	33	Lawyer	Split at the wedding
Thomas Belmonte	37	Interior Designer	Split at the wedding
Sabrina Sek	34	Real Estate Asset Analyst	Split at the wedding
Van-My	33	Osteopath	Split at the wedding
Tatiana Bazin	39	Entrepreneur	Split before the wedding
Yannick Yamanga	35	Special Effects Producer	Split before the wedding
Cynthia	30	Luxury Sales Consultant	Split before the wedding
Jonathan Debrose-Olivier	37	Chef	Split before the wedding
Alice Nguyen	35	Entrepreneur	Not engaged
Anaïs Hody	32	Entrepreneur	Not engaged
Andy	37	Software Engineer	Not engaged
Ben Jeunet	33	Entrepreneur	Not engaged
Cindy	36	Wellness Coach	Not engaged
Clément	34	Investment Fund Manager	Not engaged
David Ostro	32	Financial Advisor	Not engaged
Estelle Hodan	35	Artistic Coordinator	Not engaged
Gallien	37	Entrepreneur	Not engaged
Julien	31	Sales Manager	Not engaged
Lina Sax	30	Digital Designer	Not engaged
Lou	33	Medical Assistant	Not engaged
Ludivine	33	Photographer	Not engaged
Lussea	34	Talent Manager	Not engaged
Mady Dosso	34	Director	Not engaged
Sarah Sadad	33	Interior Designer	Not engaged
Vincent	35	Real Estate Agency Director	Not engaged
Stan Troisne	32	Veterinary Clinic Manager	Not engaged

== Episodes ==
Love Is Blind: France season 1 episodes
No.	Title	Original release date
Part 1
1	"Opening the Pods"	September 10, 2025
2	"It's Her or Me"	September 10, 2025
3	"Betrayals"	September 10, 2025
4	"Height Differences"	September 10, 2025
Part 2
5	"Toxic Relationship"	September 17, 2025
6	"Return to Paris: The Troublesome Exes"	September 17, 2025
7	"The Queen Mother"	September 17, 2025
Part 3
8	"I Love You… Me Neither"	September 24, 2025
9	"The Big Day"	September 24, 2025
Special
10	"The Reunion"	October 5, 2025

== Production ==
The post-pod honeymoons were filmed at the Banyan Tree Tamouda Bay Resort in Tangier, Morocco. Following this, the couples moved in together in Paris, France. The weddings then took place at Château De Nainville Les Roches.
