= Balaraw: Blood Island =

Filipino horror mystery television series

- Also known as: Balaraw
- Genre: Folk horror; Thriller; Mystery
- Created by: Rae Red; Jericho Aguado; Dodo Dayao
- Written by: Rae Red; Jericho Aguado; Dodo Dayao
- Directed by: Rae Red
- Starring: Janine Gutierrez; Agot Isidro; Charlie Dizon; Ronnie Lazaro; Nonie Buencamino
- Country of origin: Philippines
- Original language: Filipino
- No. of seasons: 1
- No. of episodes: 6

Production
- Executive producer: Conor Zorn
- Producer: Bianca Balbuena
- Production company: Epicmedia

Original release
- Network: Netflix
- Release: 29 August 2026

Balaraw, also known as Balaraw: Blood Island, is a Philippine folk horror mystery television series created by Rae Red, Jericho Aguado and Dodo Dayao. It premiered on Netflix on October 29, 2026.

The show stars Janine Gutierrez in the role of Sabina, a woman searching for her missing mother who later found herself at the sinister Balaraw island.

== Cast and characters ==
- Janine Gutierrez as Sabina Tejeros
- Agot Isidro as Rebecca Tejeros
- Charlie Dizon as Rebecca/Bulak Bernabe
- Ronnie Lazaro
- Mina Cruz as Diwa
- Onyl Torres as Banaag
