= Members Only: Palm Beach =

- Genre: Reality television
- Country of origin: United States
- Original language: English
- No. of seasons: 1
- No. of episodes: 8

Original release
- Network: Netflix
- Release: December 29, 2025

Members Only: Palm Beach is an American reality television series that follows a group of women navigating the social scene of Palm Beach County, Florida. The eight-episode series premiered on Netflix on December 29, 2025.

== Premise ==
The series chronicles five women in Palm Beach County's social circles as they balance friendships, rivalries, business ventures and family life. Episodes focus on charity events, galas, private clubs and social gatherings where reputations, rivalries and status are the constant focus.

== Cast ==
- Hilary Musser
- Rosalyn Yellin
- Taja Abitbol
- Ro-Mina Ustayev
- Maria Cozaminas
- Gale Brophy (recurring)
- Suebelle Robbins (recurring)

== Production ==
The show is part of Netflix’s unscripted reality slate and was announced in 2025 as a "soapy" series centered on "status, access and power" in Palm Beach County.

== Reception ==
Members Only: Palm Beach was panned by critics, with The Daily Buzz dubbing it the "worst show ever". It received a 10% rating on Rotten Tomatoes and a 3.4 out of 10 on IMDb.

As part of their review, Decider wrote that the series was "all so dull and meaningless that we almost fell asleep writing [this] paragraph." They also criticized the show's regular mentions of Mar-a-Lago and Donald Trump, saying that "if you played a game where you took a drink every time someone ... mentioned Mar-a-Lago, you'd end up passing out by the end of the first episode." Similarly, Michael Arceneaux wrote for HuffPost that "if I played a drinking game based on the number of times Mar-a-Lago was mentioned, I likely would have died of alcohol poisoning within the hour."

Town & Country ran an article gauging local reactions to the series, interviewing one resident who compared the casting choices to "...[ordering] Coca-Cola and getting Fanta." A columnist for the Palm Beach Daily News described the series as "cringeworthy" and "so unworthy" while calling cast members "geographically challenged coattail riders", referencing the fact that none of the cast live in Palm Beach. Local media group WPTV claimed that the show's filming permit in Palm Beach was canceled.

=== Political controversies ===
Gossip column Page Six claimed to have spoken to a source who overheard Mar-a-Lago members planning to campaign for cast member Rosalyn Yellin's removal from the club due to her appearance on Members Only: Palm Beach. Yellin responded in an interview with Fox News that the accusations were untrue, saying that "[p]eople want to write mean things".

Celebrity entertainment site Radar Online ran an article interviewing a source purportedly close to Donald Trump. The source said that the cast were "so desperate to drop his name as a claim to fame when ... he has no idea who they even are," adding that multiple cast members are "practically stalking" him. A number of sources, including cast member Taja Abitbol, claimed that recurring cast member Gale Brophy was removed from a Mar-a-Lago luncheon by the Secret Service after she "approach[ed] Trump while vaping" to ask the president if he remembered her.
