= Jessica Almenäs =

Swedish television presenter and reporter (born 1975)

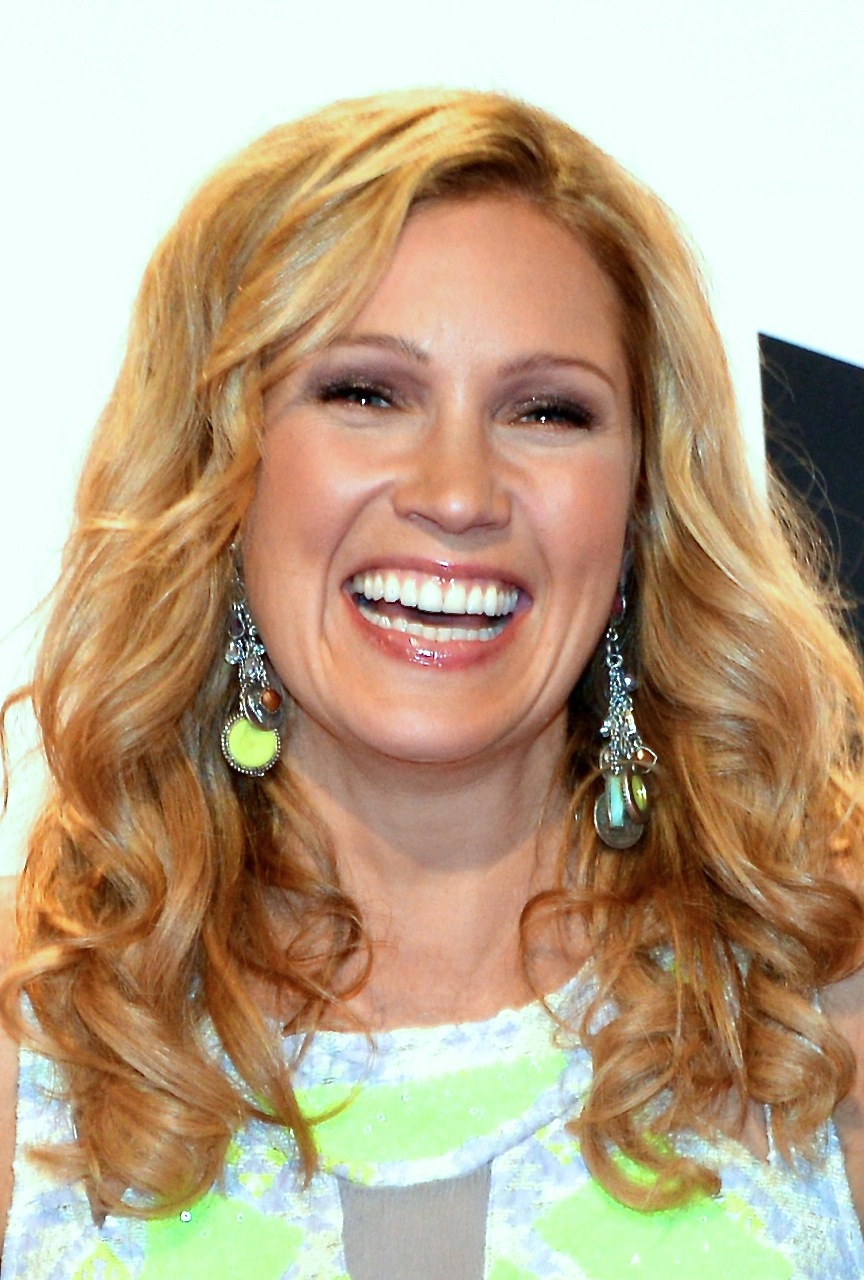
- Almenäs in 2013
- Born: Jessica Magdalena Therese Almenäs; 16 November 1975 (age 50); Luleå, Sweden
- Occupation: TV host
- Partner(s): Patrik Fahlgren; Tony André Hansen; Johan Edlund
- Children: 3

Jessica Magdalena Therese Almenäs (born 16 November 1975) is a Swedish TV host, reporter and beauty pageant titleholder. She presents the horse racing show Vinnare V75, and between 2008 and 2016, she presented the celebrity dancing show Let's Dance, both broadcast on TV4.

Almenäs finished first runner-up in Miss Sweden 1998 and went on to represent her country in Miss World that year. She has presented for Nyhetsmorgon. Along with Adam Alsing she presented the football awards show Fotbollsgalan in 2006, 2007, 2008 and 2009. She presented Kristallen in 2008 and was the reporter interviewing the celebrity guests at Kristallen 2014.

In 2011 and 2012, Almenäs presented the show Biggest Loser on TV4. She is a former basketball player and has played at the elite level for Brahe Basket.

In September 2016, Almenäs revealed that she would start to work for Kanal 5 and would end her contract with TV4.

In 2024 she presented Love Is Blind: Sweden.

== Personal life ==
Almenäs was previously in a relationship with Johan Edlund, with whom she has a son, born in 2005. She also has a son born in 2009 and a third son born in 2017 with Patrik Fahlgren. She is a cousin of NHL player Oskar Sundqvist.
