= Married at First Sight =

Reality television franchise

- Original work: Gift ved første blik (Denmark)
- Years: 2013–present

Married at First Sight is an international reality television franchise. It originated in Denmark in 2013, and was subsequently adopted in the United States in 2014, and the United Kingdom and Australia in 2015. Since then, television rights have been sold to many other countries.

== Format ==
The show is a social experiment where strangers are matched by dating experts and "marry" each other. At the end of each series, each couple decides if they want to stay together. The show, especially the Australian version, is known for its heated confrontations and controversial contestants.

== International versions ==
The format created in Denmark has been adapted in several countries.

Country	Local title	TV channel	No of seasons	First premiered	Status
Australia	Married at First Sight	Nine Network	13	May 18, 2015	Renewed
Belgium	Blind Getrouwd	VTM	9	March 7, 2016	Renewed
Bulgaria	Женени от пръв поглед	NOVA	3	March 17, 2015	Renewed
Brazil	Casamento à Primeira Vista	A&E; Lifetime	4	March 2, 2015	Ended in 2018
Croatia	Brak na prvu	RTL	5	March 16, 2020	Renewed
Czech Republic	Svatba na první pohled	TV Nova	2	2020	Ended in 2021
Denmark (original format)	Gift ved første blik	DR3 (season 1); DR1 (season 2–present)	11	2013	Renewed
Finland	Ensitreffit alttarilla	AVA (season 1–6); MTV3 (season 7–present)	11	January 6, 2015	Renewed
France	Mariés au premier regard	M6	10	November 6, 2016	Renewed
Germany	Hochzeit auf den ersten Blick	Sat.1	10	November 16, 2015	Renewed
Hungary	Házasság első látásra	RTL Klub (season 1); TV2 (season 2–present)	3	May 7, 2016	Renewed
Israel	חתונה ממבט ראשון	Keshet	6	2017	Renewed
Italy	Matrimonio a prima vista Italia	Sky Uno, TV8 (season 1–3); Real Time (season 4–present)	16	May 19, 2016	Renewed
Mongolia	Married at First Sight Mongolia/Надтай гэрлэеч	Edutainment TV	1	May 30, 2026	Renewed
Netherlands	Married at First Sight	RTL 4	10	March 1, 2016	Renewed
New Zealand	Married at First Sight	Three	4	August 12, 2022	Renewed
Poland	Ślub od pierwszego wejrzenia	TVN	11	November 3, 2016	Renewed
Portugal	Casados à primeira vista	SIC	6	October 21, 2018	Renewed
Romania	Căsătoriți pe nevăzute	Pro TV	1	September 7, 2021	Ended in 2021
Russia	Женаты с первого взгляда	STS	1	2015	Ended in 2015
Serbia	Брак на невиђено Brak na neviđeno	RTV Pink	8	2018	Renewed
Slovakia	Svatba na prvý pohĺad	Markíza	6	2020	Renewed
Slovenia	Poroka na prvi pogled	Planet TV	3	February 28, 2022	Renewed
South Africa	Married at First Sight SA	Lifetime	9	2016	Renewed
Spain	Casados a primera vista	Antena 3	4	March 2, 2015	Ended in 2018
Spain	Casados a primera vista	Telecinco	1	January 19, 2026	Renewed
Sweden	Gift vid första ögonkastet	Sveriges Television	10	November 10, 2014	Renewed
United Kingdom	Married at First Sight	Channel 4 (season 1–5); E4 (season 6–10)	10	July 9, 2015	Ended in 2025
United States	Married at First Sight	FYI (season 1–4); Lifetime (season 5–18); Peacock (season 19–present)	20	July 8, 2014	Renewed
