= Sexy Beasts =

Television series

- Genre: Reality Dating game show
- Narrated by: Susan Calman (2014); Rob Delaney (2021)
- Country of origin: United Kingdom
- Original language: English
- No. of series: 3
- No. of episodes: 20

Production
- Running time: 30 minutes
- Production company: Lion Television

Original release
- Network: BBC Three (2014); Netflix (2021)
- Release: 11 February 2014 – 7 October 2021

Sexy Beasts is a British reality television dating game show that originally and aired on BBC Three from 14 February to 9 September 2014 with Susan Calman as Narrator. Netflix revived the show from 21 July to 7 October 2021 with Rob Delaney as Narrator.

== Concept ==
The show's format involves one eligible single (male or female) and three possible suitors, all four of which have been made over with prosthetic makeup. Each "beast" will then go on a date with the singleton. Over the course of the show, two will be eliminated, at which point their make up is removed and their real identity is revealed for the first time. The remaining person is then chosen as the winner to go on a second date.

== Episodes ==
Series	Episodes	Originally released		
Series	Episodes	First released	Last released	Network
Specials	2	11 February 2014		BBC Three
1	6	5 August 2014	9 September 2014	BBC Three
2	6	21 July 2021		Netflix
3	6	7 October 2021		Netflix

=== Valentine's specials (2014) ===
No. overall	No. in series	Title	Original release date
1	1	"Bethany, the Witch"	11 February 2014
In this episode, Bethany the witch gets to date Ricardo the purple-headed alien, Scott the little old man from Essex, and the 6 ft 7in tall creature known as FrankenJosh.
2	2	"Alex, the Demon"	11 February 2014
Alex the demon seeks to find love with Belinda the tentacled-monster, Charlotte the werewolf, and Vicky the alien. Can the world's fussiest Demon stop retching for long enough enjoy a date in a cheese shop?

=== Series 1 (2014) ===
No. overall	No. in series	Title	Original release date
3	1	"Matt, the Dog"	5 August 2014
Matt the dog has three women vying for his attention - Rachael the red skull, Kirsty the blue alien and a lizard from Essex named Amber. His romantic excursions include a 4x4 driving course and a line dancing class - will one of them be the location in which he finds true love, as confused members of the public look on?
4	2	"Bridget, the Tree"	12 August 2014
We meet Bridget Jones the tree. Actually called Bridget Jones, and actually looking like a tree thanks to a monstrous mask, she dates three masked suitors - Chris the leprechaun, Jake the fish and Matt Demon.
5	3	"Adam, the Spider"	19 August 2014
We meet Adam - a spider with eight legs, six eyes and no girlfriend. Can he find one from our motley crew of Teri the fish, Franken-Sami or Sophia the Venezu-alien?
6	4	"Jade, the Cat"	26 August 2014
Jade the cat is wooed by Mike the vampire, Chris the pig and John the bulbous-headed alien. Can Jade make sweet musical love at a bagpipe lesson? Can one of the boys explain to our unwitting cat who Ron Jeremy is without getting himself into trouble?
7	5	"Latoya, the Robot"	2 September 2014
Latoya becomes the next picker. Three hours in the make-up chair have transformed her into a robot and now, with looks taken out of the equation, can she find Mr Right from her three suitors of a toad, a wooden boy and an ogre?
8	6	"Conna, the Sea God"	9 September 2014
Sexy Beasts faces its toughest assignment yet in the muscular form of Conna the Sea God. Conna is a burly boy from Wales who usually has to do nothing more than look at a girl to pull her. So how will he fare when it is his personality that needs to do the talking?

=== Series 2 (2021) ===
No. overall	No. in series	Title	Original release date
9	1	"Emma the Demon"	21 July 2021
10	2	"James the Beaver"	21 July 2021
11	3	"Kariselle the Panda"	21 July 2021
12	4	"Ibrahim the Wolf"	21 July 2021
13	5	"Nina the Dolphin"	21 July 2021
14	6	"Kelechi the Rooster"	21 July 2021

=== Series 3 (2021) ===
No. overall	No. in series	Title	Original release date
15	1	"Mick the Dragon"	7 October 2021
16	2	"Ibukun the Mummy"	7 October 2021
17	3	"Devon the Tiger"	7 October 2021
18	4	"Sullie the Bat"	7 October 2021
19	5	"Paige the Gorgon"	7 October 2021
20	6	"Robbie the Rabbit"	7 October 2021

== Reception ==
Double Toasted was highly critical of the show; calling the dates shallow and finding the makeup unnecessary. They took issue with the entire premise with Chris Herman suggesting that the series should have centered around those associated with furry fandom.

== International versions ==
The show has been adapted and broadcast in several other countries including America on A&E, Germany on Sixx and South Korea on KBS.

== See also ==
- Love Is Blind, a similar dating competition series where contestants cannot see one another while courting
