= Love Is Blind: Sweden season 1 =

2024 Netflix reality series

Love Is Blind: Sweden
- Season 1
- Presented by: Jessica Almenäs
- No. of episodes: 12

Release
- Original network: Netflix
- Original release: January 12, 2024 – March 6, 2025

Season chronology
- Next → Season 2

The first season of Love Is Blind: Sweden premiered on Netflix from January 12, 2024 to January 26, 2024, as a three-week event hosted by Jessica Almenäs. The reunion episode aired on January 28, 2024. On March 6, 2025, Netflix released an additional special for the season, titled 'After the Altar.'

== Season summary ==
Couples	Married	Still together	Relationship notes
Krisse-Ly and Rasmus	Yes	No	Krisse-Ly and Rasmus got married in 2023. They welcomed their first child, Kelian, on January 22, 2025. On June 17, 2026, Krisse-Ly posted on her Instagram account that she and Rasmus were getting divorced after three years of marriage.
Meira and Oskar	Yes	Yes	Meira and Oskar got married in 2023.
Amanda and Sergio	Yes	No	Amanda and Sergio got married in 2023. They welcomed their first child, Ralf, on 6 May 2024. They welcomed their second child, Hugo, on 2 July 2025. On April 13, 2026, it was announced that had Amanda filed for divorce from Sergio.
Emilia and Lucas	No	No	After leaving the pods, Lucas struggled to feel physically attracted to Emilia. At the altar, Emilia said yes, however, Lucas did not feel the same and said no based on his "gut feeling" at the altar. The couple dated briefly after the wedding but broke up two weeks later.
Catja and Christofer	No	No	The couple split up after a series of arguments regarding an alleged lack of attraction. Catja believed she showed love with her body, but Christofer was unable to feel it and accused her of misusing her body. After a particularly terrible fight, Catja removed her engagement ring and left for the night to collect her thoughts. The couple officially broke up the next day after Christofer threw his ring into the sea.

== Participants ==
Participants from the first season were revealed on December 14, 2023.

Name	Age	Occupation	Hometown	Relationship Status
Krisse-Ly Kuldkepp	30	Interior Designer and Sales Assistant	Sundbyberg, Sweden	Married
Rasmus Hedenstedt	32	Self-Employed	Stockholm, Sweden	Married
Meira Omar	30	Economist	Malmö, Sweden	Married
Oskar Nordstrand	32	Financial Advisor	Stockholm, Sweden	Married
Amanda Jonegard	34	Economist	Stockholm, Sweden	Split after the wedding
Sergio Rincon	38	Soccer Coach and DJ	Barcelona, Spain	Split after the wedding
Emilia Holmqvist	34	Telecommunications Business Manager	Stockholm, Sweden	Split at the altar
Lucas Gustavsson	30	Energy Production Operative Manager	Stockholm, Sweden	Split at the altar
Catja Lövstrand	32	HR Specialist	Stockholm, Sweden	Split before the wedding
Christofer Pocock	34	Self-Employed	Järvsö, Sweden	Split before the wedding
Alexandra Davidsson	33	General Secretary	Stockholm, Sweden	Not engaged
Andrea Margareta	36	Gym Studio Owner	Sundsvall, Sweden	Not engaged
Isabelle Bergman	27	Assistant Nurse and Personal Assistant	Stockholm, Sweden	Not engaged
Johan Melin	34	Salesman	Kalmar, Sweden	Not engaged
Karolina Aless	32	Payroll Controller	Stockholm, Sweden	Not engaged
Kimia Cousarie	34	Cosmetic Nurse	Malmö, Sweden	Not engaged
Adde Tzelidis	33	VP of a Security Company	Undisclosed	Not engaged
Andreas Johansson	39	Firefighter	Undisclosed	Not engaged
Daniel Brodecki	38	Entrepreneur	Undisclosed	Not engaged
Huda Altaly	30	Assistant Nurse	Undisclosed	Not engaged
Jimmy Bysell	34	Self-Employed	Undisclosed	Not engaged
Johannes Frimodig	32	Project Manager	Undisclosed	Not engaged
Leila Khodiar	35	Recruiter	Undisclosed	Not engaged
Markus Grahn	29	Training Instruction Consultant	Undisclosed	Not engaged
Mow Johansson	43	Recruitment Consultant	Undisclosed	Not engaged
Milan Grubor	28	Car Salesman	Undisclosed	Not engaged
Mohamed Sherif	32	Personal Trainer	Undisclosed	Not engaged
Nea Jilken	36	Chief Advisor	Undisclosed	Not engaged
Nina Norss	31	Destination Manager and Artist	Undisclosed	Not engaged
Sami Mäkinen	29	Social Secretary	Undisclosed	Not engaged
Sandra Wigh	36	Yoga Teacher and Artist	Undisclosed	Not engaged
Victoria Wiklund	36	Resource Educator	Undisclosed	Not engaged

== Episodes ==
Love Is Blind: Sweden season 1 episodes
No. overall	No. in season	Title	Original release date
Week 1
1	1	"The Pods Are Now Open"	January 12, 2024
2	2	"Will You Marry Me?"	January 12, 2024
3	3	"First Night Together"	January 12, 2024
4	4	"Physical Attraction"	January 12, 2024
Week 2
5	5	"Time to Move In Together"	January 19, 2024
6	6	"The Bad Boy Always Wins"	January 19, 2024
7	7	"Waking Up Alone"	January 19, 2024
8	8	"Is It True Love"	January 19, 2024
Week 3
9	9	"The Weddings"	January 26, 2024
Special
10	10	"The Reunion"	January 28, 2024
After the Altar
11	11	"One Year Later"	March 6, 2025
12	12	"Crayfishparty and Confrontation"	March 6, 2025
