= Love Is Blind (franchise) =

Reality television franchise

- Original work: Love Is Blind (USA)
- Owner: Netflix
- Years: 2020–present

Love Is Blind is a reality television franchise on Netflix created by Chris Coelen. It originated in the United States and has been reproduced in twelve other countries around the world.

The show is advertised as a “social experiment”, testing whether (as the title suggests) love is blind, and if people can fall in love based on personality, rather than appearance. Contestants talk to each other in private pods for 10 days, and can only see each other after they have gotten engaged in the pods. After that period, they spend time together, including with friends and family, and decide whether to get married.

== Format ==
The series follows an equal number of men and women hoping to find love. For 10 days, the men and women date each other in purpose-built "pods", small rooms where they can talk to each other by speaker but not see each other, except through a blue translucent barrier that allows no visual detail. The cast members are initially paired in a speed-dating format, but later can choose to have longer dates. The daters may extend a marriage proposal whenever they feel ready. (Note: The men receive instructions to propose to the women, but Giannina and Damian proposed to each other in the first season.) A couple meets face-to-face only after a marriage proposal is accepted. The engaged couples then head to a couples' retreat at a resort for one week. During this trip, they spend time getting to know each other and have their first opportunity to be physically intimate. They also meet the other couples participating in the experiment. This format of choosing among suitors without being able to see them has been compared to The Dating Game.

After the couples' retreat, the engaged couples move together into an apartment complex where they live for the final three weeks of the experiment. At the apartments, they meet their partners' friends and families and learn more about their partners' lives, exploring issues such as finances, recreation, personal habits, and their ultimate primary residence. They also plan weddings to be held at the end of four weeks. During this wedding planning period, the women go wedding dress shopping and the men go suit shopping together, bringing a few friends or family members along. They also make choices such as the design and flavor of their wedding cake. At the altar, each participant decides whether to say "I do" and get legally married.

Each season also has a reunion special released after the final episode.

== Multi-season versions ==
=== United States (2020–present) ===
Love Is Blind is the original version of the show. It is hosted by Nick Lachey and Vanessa Lachey. It has been renewed for an eleventh season that is expected to premiere towards the end of 2026.

Season	Episodes	Originally released		Location
Season	Episodes	First released	Last released	Location
1	14	February 13, 2020	July 28, 2021	Atlanta
2	14	February 11, 2022	September 16, 2022	Chicago
3	15	October 19, 2022	February 10, 2023	Dallas
4	16	March 24, 2023	September 1, 2023	Seattle
5	11	September 22, 2023	October 15, 2023	Houston
6	13	February 14, 2024	March 13, 2024	Charlotte
7	13	October 2, 2024	October 30, 2024	Washington, D.C.
8	14	February 14, 2025	March 9, 2025	Minneapolis–Saint Paul
9	13	October 1, 2025	October 29, 2025	Denver
10	13	February 11, 2026	March 11, 2026	Ohio
11	12	October 14, 2026	November 4, 2026	Boston

=== Brazil (2021–present) ===
Love is Blind: Brazil (Portuguese: Casamento às Cegas: Brasil) is hosted by Camila Queiroz and Klebber Toledo. It is produced by Endemol Shine Brasil and directed by Cassia Dian. As of 2026, there is no confirmation from Netflix as to whether this show will be renewed for a sixth season.

Series	Episodes	Originally released	
Series	Episodes	First released	Last released
1	11	6 October 2021	4 November 2021
2	11	28 December 2022	1 February 2023
3	11	7 June 2023	2 July 2023
4	11	19 June 2024	10 July 2024
5	13	10 September 2025	24 September 2025

=== United Kingdom (2024–present) ===
Love Is Blind: UK is hosted by Matt Willis and Emma Willis. It has been renewed for a fourth season that is expected to premiere in 2027.

Season	Episodes	Originally released	
Season	Episodes	First released	Last released
1	12	August 7, 2024	August 26, 2024
2	14	August 13, 2025	August 31, 2025
3	11	August 19, 2026	August 30, 2026

=== Sweden (2024–present) ===
Love Is Blind: Sverige is hosted by Jessica Almenäs and is currently the only version of the show hosted by one person. It is produced by Anna Nygren, Elias Malmberg and Mastiff. As of 2026, there is no confirmation from Netflix as to whether this show will be renewed for a fourth season.

Season	Episodes	Originally released	
Season	Episodes	First released	Last released
1	12	January 12, 2024	March 6, 2025
2	10	March 14, 2025	April 3, 2025
3	13	March 12, 2026	March 26, 2026

=== Argentina (2024–present) ===
Love Is Blind: Argentina is hosted by Wanda Nara and Darío Barassi. It is the only version of the show featuring two hosts who are not married or in a relationship with one another. It is produced by Coty Cagliolo, Adrián Quiroga, Johanna Helman, Martín Solmesky and Fremantle. As of 2026, there is no confirmation from Netflix as to whether this show will be renewed for a third season.

Season	Episodes	Originally released	
Season	Episodes	First released	Last released
1	11	November 6, 2024	November 28, 2024
2	11	June 28, 2026	July 19, 2026

=== Germany (2025–present) ===
Love Is Blind: Germany is hosted by Steffi Brungs and Christian Wackert. It is produced by Christiane Heinemann and RedSeven Entertainment. It has been renewed for a third season.

Season	Episodes	Originally released	
Season	Episodes	First released	Last released
1	10	January 3, 2025	January 19, 2025
2	10	January 8, 2026	January 18, 2026

== International versions ==
Country	Title	Host(s)	First premiered	Status	Source
France	Pour le Meilleur et à l'Aveugle	Teddy Riner; Luthna Plocus	September 10, 2025	Pending	
Italy	L'amore è Cieco: Italia	Benedetta Parodi; Fabio Caressa	December 1, 2025	Pending	
Japan	Love Is Blind: Japan	Takashi Fujii; Yuka Itaya	February 8, 2022	Ended	
Mexico	Love Is Blind: Mexico	Omar Chaparro; Lucy Chaparro	August 1, 2024	Ended	
Netherlands	Love Is Blind: Netherlands	Nicolette van Dam; Bas Smit	September 30, 2026	Pending	
Poland	Love Is Blind: Polska	Zofia Zborowska-Wrona; Andrzej Wrona	May 6, 2026	Renewed	
United Arab Emirates	Love Is Blind: Habibi	Elham Ali; Khaled Saqr	October 10, 2024	Renewed	

== Upcoming versions ==
Canadian and South African versions of the show have been announced, though little else is known of them at the time.

== See also ==
- Sexy Beasts, a dating program on Netflix with a similar premise of disguising contestants' looks with prosthetics and make-up
- Married at First Sight, a dating program on Peacock where participants marry strangers for a period of eight to ten weeks before they must choose to divorce or stay married.
- Perfect Match, a dating program where former dating reality television contestants pair up and compete in challenges as they aim to become the most compatible match.
