= List of Love Is Blind (American TV series) episodes =

The following is a list of episodes from Love Is Blind, an American dating and relationship reality television show produced by Kinetic Content that first aired on Netflix in February 2020. The show has since spawned various international spinoffs. Recent seasons have ended with a "Reunion" episode.

== Series overview ==
Season	Episodes	Originally released		Location
Season	Episodes	First released	Last released	Location
1	14	February 13, 2020	July 28, 2021	Atlanta
2	14	February 11, 2022	September 16, 2022	Chicago
3	15	October 19, 2022	February 10, 2023	Dallas
4	16	March 24, 2023	September 1, 2023	Seattle
5	11	September 22, 2023	October 15, 2023	Houston
6	13	February 14, 2024	March 13, 2024	Charlotte
7	13	October 2, 2024	October 30, 2024	Washington, D.C.
8	14	February 14, 2025	March 9, 2025	Minneapolis–Saint Paul
9	13	October 1, 2025	October 29, 2025	Denver
10	13	February 11, 2026	March 11, 2026	Ohio
11	13	October 14, 2026	November 8, 2026	Boston

== Episodes ==
=== Season 1 (2020–21) ===
Love Is Blind season 1 episodes
No. overall	No. in season	Title	Original release date
Week 1
1	1	"Is Love Blind?"	February 13, 2020
2	2	"Will You Marry Me?"	February 13, 2020
3	3	"First Night Together"	February 13, 2020
4	4	"Couples Retreat"	February 13, 2020
5	5	"Last Night in Paradise"	February 13, 2020
Week 2
6	6	"Moving in Together"	February 20, 2020
7	7	"Meet the Parents"	February 20, 2020
8	8	"Countdown to I Do's"	February 20, 2020
9	9	"Bachelor & Bachelorette Parties"	February 20, 2020
Week 3
10	10	"The Weddings"	February 27, 2020
Special
11	11	"The Reunion"	March 5, 2020
After the Altar
12	12	"Two Years Later"	July 28, 2021
13	13	"Married, Single, and It's Complicated"	July 28, 2021
14	14	"Celebrations and Confrontations"	July 28, 2021

=== Season 2 (2022) ===
Love Is Blind season 2 episodes
No. overall	No. in season	Title	Original release date
Week 1
15	1	"The Pods Are Open"	February 11, 2022
16	2	"Love Triangles"	February 11, 2022
17	3	"Love in Paradise"	February 11, 2022
18	4	"Meet the Other Couples"	February 11, 2022
19	5	"Leaving Paradise"	February 11, 2022
Week 2
20	6	"Back to Reality"	February 18, 2022
21	7	"A Family Affair"	February 18, 2022
22	8	"Final Adjustments"	February 18, 2022
23	9	"Bachelor & Bachelorette Parties"	February 18, 2022
Week 3
24	10	"The Weddings"	February 25, 2022
Special
25	11	"The Reunion"	March 4, 2022
After the Altar
26	12	"Friends Who Adventure Together, Stay Together"	September 16, 2022
27	13	"It's My Party and I'll Gossip If I Want to"	September 16, 2022
28	14	"The Future Looks Bright"	September 16, 2022

=== Season 3 (2022–23) ===
Love Is Blind season 1 episodes
No. overall	No. in season	Title	Original release date
Week 1
29	1	"Welcome to Love Is Blind!"	October 19, 2022
30	2	"Love Triangles and Love Triumphs"	October 19, 2022
31	3	"The First Night Together"	October 19, 2022
32	4	"Meet Your Exes"	October 19, 2022
Week 2
33	5	"Trouble in Paradise"	October 26, 2022
34	6	"Return to Reality"	October 26, 2022
35	7	"Impress the Parents"	October 26, 2022
Week 3
36	8	"The Perfect Fit"	November 2, 2022
37	9	"The Last Supper"	November 2, 2022
38	10	"Approaching the Altar"	November 2, 2022
Week 4
39	11	"The Wedding Day"	November 9, 2022
40	12	"The Reunion"	November 9, 2022
After the Altar
41	13	"Soulmates and Blank Slates"	February 10, 2023
42	14	"The Party Is Just Getting Started"	February 10, 2023
43	15	"A Second Shot at Love?"	February 10, 2023

=== Season 4 (2023) ===
Love Is Blind season 4 episodes
No. overall	No. in season	Title	Original release date
Week 1
44	1	"Welcome to the Pods!"	March 24, 2023
45	2	"Birthday Wishes"	March 24, 2023
46	3	"Is Love Really Blind?"	March 24, 2023
47	4	"Playing with Fire"	March 24, 2023
48	5	"Paradise Lost"	March 24, 2023
Week 2
49	6	"I Made a Mistake"	March 31, 2023
50	7	"Second Time's the Charm?"	March 31, 2023
51	8	"Pick Me"	March 31, 2023
Week 3
52	9	"Romeo and Juliet Didn't Work Out"	April 7, 2023
53	10	"Thank You, Next"	April 7, 2023
54	11	"You Are Overpriced"	April 7, 2023
Week 4
55	12	"Eternal Bliss?"	April 14, 2023
Special
56	13	"The "Live" Reunion"	April 16, 2023
After the Altar
57	14	"The One Year Anniversary"	September 1, 2023
58	15	"Moving On and Moving In"	September 1, 2023
59	16	"Settling Scores"	September 1, 2023

=== Season 5 (2023) ===
Love Is Blind season 5 episodes
No. overall	No. in season	Title	Original release date
Week 1
60	1	"So, You're a Recent Cheater?"	September 22, 2023
61	2	"Can I Talk to You for Real?"	September 22, 2023
62	3	"Blindsided"	September 22, 2023
63	4	"She's Gone...?"	September 22, 2023
Week 2
64	5	"Don't Give Up on Me"	September 29, 2023
65	6	"Going Home"	September 29, 2023
66	7	"First Class Love"	September 29, 2023
Week 3
67	8	"Love Is a Battlefield"	October 6, 2023
68	9	"Love on the Rocks"	October 6, 2023
Week 4
69	10	"Big, Big Love"	October 13, 2023
Special
70	11	"The Reunion"	October 15, 2023

=== Season 6 (2024) ===
Love Is Blind season 6 episodes
No. overall	No. in season	Title	Original release date
Week 1
71	1	"Higher Love"	February 14, 2024
72	2	"The Hunger Games of Love"	February 14, 2024
73	3	"Operation Get My Girl Back"	February 14, 2024
74	4	"The Hardest Decision of My Life"	February 14, 2024
75	5	"She Lied to Me"	February 14, 2024
76	6	"Feeling Uncomfy"	February 14, 2024
Week 2
77	7	"Silence Speaks Volumes"	February 21, 2024
78	8	"Clinging to Love"	February 21, 2024
79	9	"Secret Rendezvous"	February 21, 2024
Week 3
80	10	"What Could Have Been"	February 28, 2024
81	11	"Roller Coaster of Love"	February 28, 2024
Week 4
82	12	"Meet Me at the Altar"	March 6, 2024
Special
83	13	"The Reunion"	March 13, 2024

=== Season 7 (2024) ===
Love Is Blind season 6 episodes
No. overall	No. in season	Title	Original release date
Week 1
84	1	"No More Situationships"	October 2, 2024
85	2	"Perfect Husband, but..."	October 2, 2024
86	3	"Is It Too Late?"	October 2, 2024
87	4	"The Tables Have Turned"	October 2, 2024
88	5	"What The Duck"	October 2, 2024
89	6	"6 Things I Hate About You"	October 2, 2024
Week 2
90	7	"Truth Bombs"	October 9, 2024
91	8	"Dirty Laundry"	October 9, 2024
92	9	"Is Love Enough"	October 9, 2024
Week 3
93	10	"The Text From an Ex"	October 16, 2024
94	11	"The Risk of Falling in Love"	October 16, 2024
Week 4
95	12	"Leap of Faith"	October 23, 2024
Special
96	13	"The Reunion"	October 30, 2024

=== Season 8 (2025) ===
"Love Is Blind" season 8 Episodes
No. overall	No. in season	Title	Original release date
Week 1
97	1	"I Have A Husband"	February 14, 2025
98	2	"Open Hearts, Open Minds, Can't Lose"	February 14, 2025
99	3	"Hunger Games of Love"	February 14, 2025
100	4	"So Your Girlfriend Has a Boyfriend"	February 14, 2025
101	5	"Breaking Up Is Hard To Do"	February 14, 2025
102	6	"Do I Know You?"	February 14, 2025
Week 2
103	7	"Bueller?"	February 21, 2025
104	8	"A Family Affair"	February 21, 2025
105	9	"The EX-Files"	February 21, 2025
Week 3
106	10	"Oh Spare Me"	February 28, 2025
107	11	"Sliding Down Slopes and Into DMs"	February 28, 2025
108	12	"Brides' Last Ride"	February 28, 2025
Week 4
109	13	"The Weddings"	March 7, 2025
Special
110	14	"The Reunion"	March 9, 2025

=== Season 9 (2025) ===
"Love Is Blind" season 8 Episodes
No. overall	No. in season	Title	Original release date
Week 1
111	1	"A Love that Sparkles"	October 1, 2025
112	2	"Love Me When I'm Blind?"	October 1, 2025
113	3	"Ghost Town"	October 1, 2025
114	4	"The Dangerous Games We Play"	October 1, 2025
115	5	"I Want You To Want Me"	October 1, 2025
116	6	"Coming In Hot"	October 1, 2025
Week 2
117	7	"Unknown Factors"	October 8, 2025
118	8	"Stripping the Veil"	October 8, 2025
119	9	"Ghosts of Pods Past"	October 8, 2025
Week 3
120	10	"Runaway Groom"	October 15, 2025
121	11	"Don't Go Breaking My Heart"	October 15, 2025
Week 4
122	12	"Vow or Never"	October 22, 2025
Special
123	13	"The Reunion"	October 29, 2025

=== Season 10 (2026) ===
"Love Is Blind" season 8 Episodes
No. overall	No. in season	Title	Original release date
Week 1
124	1	"Honey, I'm Home"	February 11, 2026
125	2	"A Sticky Situation"	February 11, 2026
126	3	"Um, Redo!"	February 11, 2026
127	4	"Stage Five Clinger"	February 11, 2026
128	5	"Where the Hell is My Husband?"	February 11, 2026
129	6	"Never Have I Ever"	February 11, 2026
Week 2
130	7	"Moving In and Unpacking Baggage"	February 18, 2026
131	8	"A Snake in the Grass"	February 18, 2026
132	9	"I'm Just Being Honest"	February 18, 2026
Week 3
133	10	"Vanishing Mode"	February 25, 2026
134	11	"See Where the Chips Fall"	February 25, 2026
Week 4
135	12	"Head vs. Heart"	March 4, 2026
Special
136	13	"The Reunion"	March 11, 2026

=== Season 11 (2026) ===
"Love Is Blind" season 11 Episodes
No. overall	No. in season	Title	Original release date
Week 1
137	1	"Enchanted To Meet You"	October 14, 2026
138	2	"What a Woman!"	October 14, 2026
139	3	"Together at Last"	October 14, 2026
140	4	"Sink Or Swim"	October 14, 2026
141	5	"Here Comes the Dud"	October 14, 2026
Week 2
142	6	"When You Know You Know"	October 21, 2026
143	7	"Happy Wife, Happy Life"	October 21, 2026
144	8	"Under Pressure"	October 21, 2026
Week 3
145	9	"Buzz Kill"	October 28, 2026
146	10	"Where There's a Will, There's a Way"	October 28, 2026
147	11	"If Not Now, When?"	October 28, 2026
Week 4
148	12	"Everything Is Better with You"	November 4, 2026
Special
149	13	"The Reunion"	November 8, 2026
