= List of Love Is Blind (American TV series) participants =

The following is a list of individuals who have appeared on the Netflix reality series Love Is Blind.

== Participants ==
Season	Name	Age	Occupation	Result
1	Lauren Speed	32	Content Creator	Married
1	Cameron Hamilton	28	Data Scientist	Married
1	Amber Pike	27	Ex-Tank Mechanic	Married
1	Matthew Barnett	27	Engineer	Married
1	Giannina Gibelli	25	Business Owner	Split at Wedding
1	Damian Powers	27	Ex-General Manager	Split at Wedding
1	Jessica Batten	34	Regional Manager	Split at Wedding
1	Mark Cuevas	24	Fitness Trainer	Split at Wedding
1	Kelly Chase	33	Holistic Health and Empowerment Coach	Split at Wedding
1	Kenny Barnes	27	Sales	Split at Wedding
1	Diamond Jack	28	Former NBA Dancer	Split before Wedding
1	Carlton Morton	34	Social Media Marketer	Split before Wedding
1	Danielle Drouin	27	Yoga Instructor	Split before Wedding
1	Rory Newbrough	28	Senior Consultant and Content Creator	Split before Wedding
1	Lexie Skipper	26	Sales Manager	Split before Wedding
1	Westley Baer	27	Sales Manager and Life Coach	Split before Wedding
1	Lauren "LC" Chamblin	26	Recruiter and Account Executive	Not engaged
1	Alyson Costa	36	Pediatric Nurse Client Relations Director	Not engaged
1	Andy Rickert	30	Welder	Not engaged
1	Briana Holmes	24	CEO	Not engaged
1	Ebony Alexis	30	Journalist	Not engaged
1	India Bridgeforth	29	Project Manager	Not engaged
1	Jon Smith	38	CEO	Not engaged
1	Kay Mitchell	30	Administrative Director	Not engaged
1	Kenneth Smith	36	Master Barber and Shop Owner	Not engaged
1	Lillie Williams	36	CEO	Not engaged
1	Matt Thomas	28	Director	Not engaged
1	Mikey Cobb	31	Business Analyst	Not engaged
1	Ryan Martin	29	Automotive Sales	Not engaged
1	Taylor Lupton	31	Creative Director	Not engaged
2	Iyanna McNeely	27	Program Coordinator	Married
2	Jarrette Jones	32	Project Manager	Married
2	Danielle Ruhl	29	Associate Director of Marketing	Married
2	Nick Thompson	36	VP of Product Marketing	Married
2	Natalie Lee	29	Consulting Manager	Split at Wedding
2	Shayne Jansen	32	Realtor	Split at Wedding
2	Deepti Vempati	31	Information Data Analyst	Split at Wedding
2	Abhishek "Shake" Chatterjee	33	Veterinarian and House DJ	Split at Wedding
2	Mallory Zapata	32	Communications Manager	Split at Wedding
2	Salvador Perez	31	Executive Assistant	Split at Wedding
2	Shaina Hurley	32	Freelance Hairstylist	Split before Wedding
2	Kyle Abrams	29	Glazier	Split before Wedding
2	Caitlin McKee	31	Medical Sales Professional	Split before Wedding
2	James "Joey" Miller	30	Business Strategy Consultant	Split before Wedding
2	Kara Williams	32	Client Service Manager	Split before Wedding
2	Jason Beaumont	31	Flight Attendant	Split before Wedding
2	Aja Johnson	28	Paralegal	Not engaged
2	Brandon McGhee	36	Insurance Broker	Not engaged
2	Brian Ngo	32	Advertising Strategist	Not engaged
2	Chassidy Mickale	34	Business Owner	Not engaged
2	Haseeb Hussain	28	Lawyer	Not engaged
2	Hope Antoniello	32	Sales Manager	Not engaged
2	Jeremy Hartwell	36	Director and Entrepreneur	Not engaged
2	Juhie Faheem	31	Clinical Therapist	Not engaged
2	Julius Cacho	39	Logistics Manager	Not engaged
2	Olivia Harris	29	Recruitment Partner	Not engaged
2	Rocky Smith	30	Executive	Not engaged
2	Shea'na Grigsby	36	Event Partnership Director	Not engaged
2	Trisha Frame	30	Real Estate Broker	Not engaged
2	Vito Salamone	33	Pizzeria Owner	Not engaged
3	Alexa Alfia	29	Insurance Manager	Married
3	Brennon Lemieux	32	Sales Manager	Married
3	Colleen Reed	25	Ballet Dancer and Digital PR Strategist	Married
3	Matt Bolton	27	VP of Aerospace Manufacturing & Co.	Married
3	Zanab Jaffrey	31	Flight Attendant	Split at Wedding
3	Cole Barnett	26	Realtor	Split at Wedding
3	Raven Ross	27	Pilates Instructor	Split at Wedding
3	Sikiru "SK" Alagbada	34	Data Engineer	Split at Wedding
3	Nancy Rodriguez	31	Speech Pathologist and Real Estate Investor	Split at Wedding
3	Bartise Bowden	25	Accountant	Split at Wedding
3	Andrew Liu	29	Consultant	Not engaged
3	Anthony LaScalea	33	Attorney	Not engaged
3	Jess Gumbert	30	Senior Event Producer	Not engaged
3	Amanda Peterson	31	Stylist	Not engaged
3	Ashley Randermann	29	Chiropractor and Equestrian	Not engaged
3	Brannigan Max	35	Critical Care Nurse	Not engaged
3	Charita Scott	35	Makeup Artist	Not engaged
3	Chelsey Jordan	27	Customer Success Manager	Not engaged
3	Dakota Easley	29	Aerospace Engineer	Not engaged
3	Dale Dalida	32	Cybersecurity Student	Not engaged
3	DaVonté Black	29	Fitness Development Coach	Not engaged
3	Julian Torres	34	Managing Director of Operations	Not engaged
3	Kalekia Adams	31	ICU Nurse Practitioner	Not engaged
3	Kim Clarke	30	Teacher and Coach	Not engaged
3	Loren Langenbeck	36	Medical Device Representative	Not engaged
3	Nash Buehler	34	Realtor	Not engaged
3	Simmer Bajwa	27	Director of Marketing Technology	Not engaged
3	Tony Taylor	34	Medical Device Sales Representative	Not engaged
3	Valerie Truong	35	Dermatologist	Not engaged
3	Zach Gordon	29	Chiropractic Student and Interior Quality Control Manager	Not engaged
4	Tiffany Pennywell	37	Client Lead Recruiter	Married
4	Brett Brown	36	Design Director for Nike	Married
4	Zack Goytowski	31	Criminal Defense Attorney	Married
4	Bliss Poureetezadi	33	Senior Program Manager	Married
4	Chelsea Griffin	31	Pediatric Speech–Language Pathologist	Married
4	Kwame Appiah	33	Sales Development Manager	Married
4	Micah Lussier	26	Marketing Manager	Split at Wedding
4	Paul Peden	29	Environmental Scientist	Split at Wedding
4	Jackelina Bonds	27	Certified Dental Assistant	Split before Wedding
4	Marshall Glaze	27	Marketing Manager	Split before Wedding
4	Irina Solomonova	26	Business Owner	Split before Wedding
4	Wendi Kong	28	Aerospace Engineer	Split before Wedding
4	Jimmy Forde	29	Technical Product Manager	Split before Wedding
4	Ava Van Jenson	32	Communications Specialist	Split before Wedding
4	Joshua “JP” Schultz	30	Plant Operations Director	Split before Wedding
4	Josh Demas	31	Project Engineer	Split before Wedding
4	Monica Rodriguez	31	Elementary School Teacher	Split before Wedding
4	Amber Wilder	34	Flight Attendant	Not engaged
4	April King	29	Sales and Marketing Coordinator	Not engaged
4	Bill Alamshahi	33	Real Estate Investor	Not engaged
4	Brandie Bowman	39	Real Estate Broker	Not engaged
4	Chris Clemens	32	Technical Recruiter	Not engaged
4	J. Conner Fremmerlid	28	Operations Manager	Not engaged
4	Jack Bonner	30	Software Sales	Not engaged
4	Juan Johnson	30	Mortgage Loan Officer	Not engaged
4	Kacia Clark	31	Family Support Specialist	Not engaged
4	Kendra Patrick	33	Social Worker	Not engaged
4	Molly McGrew	32	Marriage and Family Therapist	Not engaged
4	Quincy Sutton	36	Gym Owner and Fitness Coach	Not engaged
4	Ryland Longoni	29	Commercial Insurance and Real Estate	Not engaged
5
5	Lydia Velez Gonzalez	32	Geologist	Married
5	James "Milton" Johnson IV	25	Petroleum Engineer	Married
5	Stacy Snyder	34	Director of Operations	Split at Wedding
5	Izzy Zapata	31	Sales	Split at Wedding
5	Renee Poche	32	Veterinarian	Split at Wedding
5	Carter Wall	30	Construction	Split at Wedding
5	Taylor Rue	26	Teacher	Split before Wedding
5	Jared "JP" Pierce	32	Firefighter	Split before Wedding
5	Paige Tillman	32	Stylist	Split before Wedding
5	Josh Simmons	32	Sales Representative	Split before Wedding
5	Aaliyah Cosby	29	ICU Travel Nurse	Not engaged
5	Christopher Fox	28	Project Manager for Commercial and Retail Development	Not engaged
5	Connor Moore	31	Geoscientist	Not engaged
5	Efrain Batista	27	Software Sales	Not engaged
5	Enoch Culliver	27	Financial Advisor	Not engaged
5	Erica Anthony	27	Marketing Manager	Not engaged
5	Ernesto Solorzano Jr	32	Supply Chain Manager	Not engaged
5	Estefania Garcia	30	Teacher and Dancer	Not engaged
5	Jarred Gibson	34	University Director	Not engaged
5	Johnie Maraist	32	Lawyer	Not engaged
5	Justice Currey	28	Personal Trainer	Not engaged
5	Linda Obi	30	Talent Acquisition Recruiter	Not engaged
5	Maris Prakonekham	30	HR Specialist	Not engaged
5	Mayra Cardenas	25	Minister	Not engaged
5	Miriam Amah	32	Scientist	Not engaged
5	Robert Martinez	30	Special Education Teacher	Not engaged
5	Shondra	32	Flight Attendant	Not engaged
5	Uche Okoroha	34	Lawyer and Entrepreneur	Not engaged
6
6	Amy Cortés	28	E-Commerce Specialist	Married
6	Johnny McIntyre	28	Account Executive	Married
6	Amber Desiree "AD" Smith	33	Real Estate Broker	Split at Wedding
6	Clay Gravesande	31	Enterprise Sales and Entrepreneur	Split at Wedding
6	Chelsea Blackwell	31	Flight Attendant and Event Planner	Split before Wedding
6	Jimmy Presnell	28	Software Sales	Split before Wedding
6	Laura Dadisman	34	Account Director	Split before Wedding
6	Jeramey Lutinski	32	Intralogistics	Split before Wedding
6	Brittany Mills	25	Senior Client Partner	Split before Wedding
6	Kenneth Gorham	26	Middle School Principal	Split before Wedding
6	Alejandra Toro	28	Financial Consultant	Not engaged
6	Amber Grant	31	Medical Device Sales	Not engaged
6	Amy Cai	34	Public Relations Director	Not engaged
6	Ariel Gomerez	32	Mortgage Broker	Not engaged
6	Ashley Wala	32	Nurse Practitioner	Not engaged
6	Austin Borders	27	Software Sales	Not engaged
6	Danette Coombs	33	Flight Attendant	Not engaged
6	Danielle Washington	30	Corporate Communications	Not engaged
6	Deion Perry	27	Software Sales	Not engaged
6	Drake Carmody	32	Video Producer	Not engaged
6	Jamal Stewart	32	Store Director	Not engaged
6	Jessica Vestal	29	Executive Assistant	Not engaged
6	Mackenzie Tenold	25	Makeup Artist	Not engaged
6	Matthew Duliba	37	Senior Financial Advisor	Not engaged
6	Nolan McNulty	31	Management Consultant	Not engaged
6	Sarah Bick	30	Customer Support Manager	Not engaged
6	Sunni Haralalka	34	Business Analyst	Not engaged
6	Trevor Sova	31	Project Manager	Not engaged
6	Vince Doa	35	Lawyer	Not engaged
7
7	Taylor Krause	30	Clean Energy Policy Consultant	Married
7	Garrett Josemans	33	Quantum Physicist	Married
7	Ashley Adionser	32	Marketing Director	Married
7	Tyler Francis	34	Account Manager	Married
7	Marissa George	32	Lawyer	Split before Wedding
7	Ramses Prashad	35	Programme Associate at Justice Reform Non-Profit	Split before Wedding
7	Hannah Jiles	27	Medical Device Sales	Split before Wedding
7	Nick Dorka	29	Real Estate Agent	Split before Wedding
7	Alexandra "Alex" Byrd	33	Producer	Split before Wedding
7	Tim Godbee	33	Web Content Strategist	Split before Wedding
7	Monica Davis	37	Sales Executive	Split before Wedding
7	Stephen Richardson	34	Electrician	Split before Wedding
7	Brittany Wisniewski	33	Esthetician	Split before Wedding
7	Leo Braudy	31	Art Dealer	Split before Wedding
7	Bohdan Olinares	36	Tech Sales	Not engaged
7	David Romero	29	Project Manager	Not engaged
7	Jason Drecchio	30	Loan Officer	Not engaged
7	Nick Pugh	31	Commercial Real Estate Brokerage	Not engaged
7	Perry Slomnicki	31	Realtor	Not engaged
7	Raymond Pottebaum	33	Consultant	Not engaged
7	Tamar Smith	33	Video Editor and Animator	Not engaged
7	Ally Dawson	31	Master Esthetician	Not engaged
7	Ashley W	32	Health and Wellness Educator	Not engaged
7	Dylan Maddox	30	Realtor and Artist	Not engaged
7	Katie Bollinger	36	Sports Marketing Manager	Not engaged
7	Morgan Moore	33	Sales Team Lead	Not engaged
7	Nina Zafar	32	Journalist	Not engaged
7	Tara Zafar	29	Senior Marketing Manager	Not engaged
7	Jenny Zamora	31	Account Training Coordinator	Not engaged
8	Taylor Haag	32	Colonoscopy Nurse	Married
8	Daniel Hastings	30	Sales Account Executive	Married
8	Kylie Schuelke	28	Medical Student	Engaged
8	Brian Sumption	30	Wine Bar Owner	Engaged
8	Virginia Miller	34	Healthcare Recruiter	Split at Wedding
8	Devin Buckley	29	Youth Director/Coach	Split at Wedding
8	Monica Danús	28	Digital Marketing	Split at Wedding
8	Joey Leveille	35	Physician Associate	Split at Wedding
8	Sara Carton	29	Oncology Nurse	Split at Wedding
8	Ben Mezzenga	28	Developer	Split at Wedding
8	Lauren O'Brien	31	Educational Sales	Split before Wedding
8	David Bettenburg	33	Medical Device Sales	Split before Wedding
8	Brittany Dodson	35	Partnership Executive	Split before Wedding
8	Mo Ndiaye	35	Property Manager	Split before Wedding
8	Adam Bevis	33	Fashion Director/Co-Owner	Not engaged
8	Alex Brown	29	Commercial Real Estate Broker	Not engaged
8	Andrew Cole	27	Realtor	Not engaged
8	Benji Smith	26	Entrepreneur/Realtor	Not engaged
8	Brad Morgan	35	Dentist	Not engaged
8	Hugo Orieny	30	Marketing	Not engaged
8	Mason Horacek	33	Cinematographer	Not engaged
8	Scott Sanderson	34	Project Manager	Not engaged
8	Tom Dann	38	Management Consultant	Not engaged
8	Amanda Burke	43	District Retail Manager	Not engaged
8	Ashley Suter	28	Client Success Manager	Not engaged
8	Casandra Barron	30	Hairstylist	Not engaged
8	Madison Errichiello	28	Artist	Not engaged
8	Meg Fink	31	Oncology Nurse	Not engaged
8	Molly Mullaney	30	Executive Assistant	Not engaged
8	Tiera Shavone	34	Marketing Strategist	Not engaged
8	Vanessa Boreland	31	Media Planner	Not engaged
8	Yemi Ajagbe	30	Product Sales Manager	Not engaged
9
9	Kalybriah Haskin	29	Social Worker	Split at Wedding
9	Edmond Harvey	29	Realtor	Split at Wedding
9	Aline "Ali" Lima	29	Nurse	Split at Wedding
9	Anton Yarosh	29	Transportation/Logistics	Split at Wedding
9	Megan Walerius	35	Entrepreneur	Split before Wedding
9	Jordan Keltner	30	Service Manager	Split before Wedding
9	Madison Maidenberg	28	UX/UI Designer	Split before Wedding
9	Joe Ferrucci	29	Sales	Split before Wedding
9	Annie Lancaster	31	Hair Salon Owner	Split before Wedding
9	Nick Amato	28	Luxury Watch Dealer	Split before Wedding
9	Kacie McIntosh	34	Hair and Makeup Artist	Split before Wedding
9	Patrick Suzuki	31	Construction Manager	Split before Wedding
9	Blake Anderson	34	Accountant	Not engaged
9	Brenden Guthrie	32	Finance Manager	Not engaged
9	Chase Navarro	29	Water Treatment Consultant	Not engaged
9	Dayo Ogunjimi	30	IT Advisor	Not engaged
9	Dylan Mustoe	32	Financial Analyst	Not engaged
9	Jensen Butler	29	Data Analyst	Not engaged
9	Logan Krantz	35	Account Executive	Not engaged
9	Michael Neal	41	Medical Sales	Not engaged
9	Mike Brockway	38	Real Estate Investor	Not engaged
9	Rohan Patel	27	Private Equity	Not engaged
9	Anastasia Lubline	29	Nurse	Not engaged
9	Anna Yuan	28	Hairstylist	Not engaged
9	Ashley Usery	35	Director of Compliance	Not engaged
9	Aza Weyer	32	Events Manager	Not engaged
9	Chyna Craig	39	Marketing Manager	Not engaged
9	Hilary Seale	39	Medical Device Sales	Not engaged
9	Kait Nemunaitis	33	Registered Dietitian	Not engaged
9	Kaylen Johnson	29	Account Executive	Not engaged
9	Megan Hutton	36	Property Manager	Not engaged
9	Shelby Crisman	35	Realtor	Not engaged
10
10	Christine Hamilton	31	Speech-Language Pathologist	Married
10	Victor St. John	34	Professor	Married
10	Amber Morrison	34	Nurse Practitioner	Married
10	Jordan Faeth	34	Account Executive	Married
10	Elissa Finley	39	Nurse	Engaged
10	Miguel Lopez	32	Software Engineer	Engaged
10	Ashley Carpenter	34	Claims Manager	Split at Wedding
10	Alex Henderson	31	Financial Sales	Split at Wedding
10	Emma Betsinger	28	Retail Merchandising	Split at Wedding
10	Mike Gibney	30	Sales Manager	Split at Wedding
10	Bri McNees	34	Senior Merchant	Split before Wedding
10	Connor Spies	32	Account Management	Split before Wedding
10	Brittany Wicker	33	Registered Nurse	Split before Wedding
10	Devonta "Devo" Anderson	32	Loan Officer	Split before Wedding
10	Jessica Barrett	39	Infectious Disease Physician	Split before Wedding
10	Chris Fusco	33	Account Executive	Split before Wedding
10	Alex Lowrie	33	Assistant Controller	Not engaged
10	Brennan O’Callaghan	30	Accounting and Finance Manager	Not engaged
10	Haramol Gill	36	E.R. Doctor	Not engaged
10	Kevan Jones	32	Realtor	Not engaged
10	Kevin Verhoef	35	Certified Public Accountant	Not engaged
10	Parker Knapp	29	Business Owner	Not engaged
10	Steven Sunday	32	Finance	Not engaged
10	Tyler Hunt	32	Management Consultant	Not engaged
10	Brittany S.	37	Flight Attendant	Not engaged
10	Bry Thomas	30	Commercial Real Estate Agent	Not engaged
10	Dynasty Ballard	33	Senior Marketing Manager	Not engaged
10	Jennifer Underwood	32	Financial Professional	Not engaged
10	Keya Kellum	31	Marketing Director	Not engaged
10	Priyanka Grandhi	34	Recruiter	Not engaged
10	Rosalyn Ransaw	31	Marketing Manager	Not engaged
10	Tyler Lanier	33	Sales Leader	Not engaged

== Post filming ==
Season	Couples	Married	Still Together?	Status	Ref.
1	Lauren Speed & Cameron Hamilton	Yes	Yes	Married in November 2018. In October 2025, the couple announced the birth of their son.	
1	Amber Pike & Matthew Barnett	Yes	Yes	Married in November 2018. In April 2025, the couple announced the birth of their daughter.	
1	Giannina Gibelli & Damian Powers	No	No	Split on their wedding day after Damian said no (Giannina said yes). During the reunion special, it was revealed that they had gotten back together. After the airing of After the Altar, Giannina revealed the couple had broken up again in early 2021. Giannina is now married to Blake Horstmann, runner up on season 14 of The Bachelorette, as of June 20, 2026. Their first child was born March 29, 2024.	
1	Jessica Batten & Mark Cuevas	No	No	Jessica left Mark at the altar on their wedding day. Mark did not attend filming for After the Altar but was mentioned to be dating Aubrey Rainey. Mark and Aubrey married in September 2022 and have two sons together. Mark announced their breakup in March 2025. Jessica married podiatrist Ben McGrath in August 2022. Their first child was born in June 2023.	
1	Kelly Chase & Kenny Barnes	No	No	Split on their wedding day after Kelly said no. During the reunion special, it was revealed that Kenny was in a relationship. Kenny married his partner, Alexandra Garrison, in the spring of 2022 and in June 2025 their daughter was born.	
1	Diamond Jack & Carlton Morton	No	No	The relationship imploded after a dramatic fight during the couple's trip to Playa del Carmen, Mexico, during which they fought about Carlton's recently disclosed bisexuality, his lack of communication, and Carlton's derogatory comments about Diamond. As of May 2026, both were single.	
2	Iyanna McNeely & Jarrette Jones	Yes	No	Married in June 2021. The couple announced their separation on August 17, 2022. Iyanna married Alexander Lewis in January 2026.	
2	Danielle Ruhl & Nick Thompson	Yes	No	Married in June 2021. Danielle filed for divorce from Nick on August 21, 2022. As of May 2026, Danielle is single and Nick is in a relationship with Carrie Staton.	
2	Natalie Lee & Shayne Jansen	No	No	Split on their wedding day after Natalie said no (Shayne said yes). As of May 2026, both are single.	
2	Deepti Vempati & Abhishek "Shake" Chatterjee	No	No	Split on their wedding day after Deepti said no. It was revealed during After the Altar that she and castmate Kyle Abrams had begun dating but ultimately split in the summer of 2022. As of 2026, Shake is in a relationship and Deepti is single.	
2	Mallory Zapata & Salvador Perez	No	No	Split on their wedding day after Sal said no. During the reunion special, it was revealed they went on a date after filming, but that Sal is now dating someone else. As of May 2026, Mallory is engaged and Salvador is single.	
2	Shaina Hurley & Kyle Abrams	No	No	Shaina left during the couple's trip to Cancún, Mexico, and officially ended the relationship after Kyle met her family. During the reunion special, Shaina revealed she is in a relationship. Shaina got married in July 2022 and had a son February 2024. As of May 2026, Kyle is married and expecting a child with Ashleigh Nicole Tan	
3	Alexa Alfia & Brennon Lemieux	Yes	No	Married in Summer 2021. The couple announced on January 26, 2024, that they are expecting their first child in summer 2024. Their daughter was born in July. Announced their separation in December 2025.	
3	Colleen Reed & Matt Bolton	Yes	No	Married in Summer 2021. The couple announced their separation in May 2025.	
3	Zanab Jaffrey & Cole Barnett	No	No	Split on their wedding day after Zanab said no.	
3	Raven Ross & Sikiru "SK" Alagbada	No	No	SK said no on their wedding day. The couple dated for a while after the show and SK proposed again but they announced their split in November 2022.	
3	Nancy Rodriguez & Bartise Bowden	No	No	Split on their wedding day after Bartise said no (Nancy said yes). Bartise announced on April 7, 2023, that he is now the father to a baby boy.	
4	Tiffany Pennywell & Brett Brown	Yes	Yes	Married in May 2022	
4	Zack Goytowski & Bliss Poureetezadi	Yes	Yes	Did not initially get engaged in the pods but later reconnected after Zack and Irina's engagement ended. Got engaged on a boat date in Seattle. Married in May 2022. They announced Bliss was pregnant on November 21, 2023. Their daughter was born on April 26, 2024.	
4	Chelsea Griffin & Kwame Appiah	Yes	No	Married in May 2022. The couple announced their separation in May 2026.	
4	Micah Lussier & Paul Peden	No	No	Split on their wedding day after Paul said no. They tried dating briefly after the wedding but split permanently shortly after. Paul entered a new relationship in May 2023 and Micah entered a new one in July 2025.	
4	Jackelina Bonds & Marshall Glaze	No	No	Jackie broke up with Marshall and went on to have a relationship with Josh Demas from the show; they are no longer together.	
4	Zack Goytowski & Irina Solomonova	No	No	Got engaged in the pods but broke off the engagement in Mexico after Irina said Zack gave her "the ick" and that she still had feelings for Paul; meanwhile, Zack expressed feelings for Bliss.	
4	Josh Demas & Monica Rodriguez	No	No	Got engaged in the pods but broke off the engagement soon after. Their relationship was not telecast.	
5	Lydia Arleen Velez Gonzalez & James "Milton" Johnson IV	Yes	No	Married in May 2022. Lydia announced their separation in June 2025.	
5	Stacy Snyder & Izzy Zapata	No	No	Split on their wedding day after Stacy said no (Izzy said yes). As of February 2024, Stacy is in a relationship and Izzy is said to appear in Season 2 of Perfect Match.	
5	Taylor Rue & Jared "JP" Pierce	No	No	Got engaged in the pods but broke up at the end of the Mexico trip. As of February 2024, JP and Taylor are both in relationships.	
6	Amy Cortés & Johnny McIntyre	Yes	Yes	Married on May 10, 2023	
6	Amber Desiree "AD" Smith & Clay Gravesande	No	No	Split on their wedding day after Clay said no (AD said yes). Clay said he is not ready for marriage and vowed to seek therapy on the matter. AD has been in a relationship for a few years and got engaged in March 2025.	
6	Chelsea Blackwell & Jimmy Presnell	No	No	The couple ended their engagement after Jimmy confessed that Chelsea betrayed his trust by exposing his past sexual relationship with one of his friends on television.	
6	Laura Dadisman & Jeramey Lutinski	No	No	The couple ended their engagement after Jeramey met in secret with fellow castmate Sarah Ann. Jeramey and Sarah Ann continued to date for several months. Sarah Ann confirmed their split in September 2024.	
6	Brittany Mills & Kenneth Gorham	No	No	Kenneth ended their engagement after Brittany said she felt a lack of passion in the relationship outside of the pods. During the reunion, it was revealed that Brittany and Kenneth are now just friends.	
7	Taylor Krause & Garrett Josemans	Yes	Yes	Married on November 13, 2023	
7	Ashley Adionser & Tyler Francis	Yes	No	Married in November 2023. Ashley announced their separation and plans to divorce in January 2025. The divorce was finalized in June 2025.	
7	Marissa George & Ramses Prashad	No	No	Ramses ended the engagement shortly before the wedding after deciding that he was not ready for marriage.	
7	Hannah Jiles & Nick Dorka	No	No	Hannah ended the engagement after deciding that she didn't think Nick was ready for marriage.	
7	Alexandra "Alex" Byrd & Tim Godbee	No	No	The couple split shortly after Alex met Tim's family. Tim did not like that Alex took a nap during the visit, and him bringing it up turned into a larger conversation about their communication issues that ended in Tim saying he didn't want to see her again.	
7	Monica Davis & Stephen Richardson	No	No	The couple ended their engagement shortly after coming back to DC when Monica discovered that Stephen was sending sexual messages to another woman. Despite apologies from Stephen, Monica did not feel like she could continue. Monica is now in a new relationship while Stephen is single.	
7	Brittany Wisniewski & Leo Braudy	No	No	Despite getting engaged on camera, Brittany and Leo were not chosen to go on the honeymoon. They took their own vacation to Miami and broke up shortly afterwards. They have stayed close friends, with Leo being single and Brittany being in a new relationship.	
8	Taylor Haag & Daniel Hastings	Yes	Yes	Married in March 2024	
8	Virginia Miller & Devin Buckley	No	No	Split on their wedding day after Virginia said no (Devin said yes). Virginia did not feel like their relationship was at the level required for marriage, specifically pointing out their communication issues, politics, and sex as reasons their relationship wasn't deep enough for her to say yes.	
8	Monica Danús & Joey Leveille	No	No	Split on their wedding day after Monica said no. Monica did not feel they were fully ready to get married despite their love for each other, and Joey agreed with her. Monica later said she didn't feel reassured enough in their relationship to say yes. Joey is currently in a relationship with fellow participant Sara.	
8	Sara Carton & Ben Mezzenga	No	No	Split on their wedding day after Sara said no. After getting into a car with her mom and sister, Sara told them that the two weren't similar enough in values that were important to her, pointing out Ben's lack of interest and opinions on things like social issues. Sara is currently in a relationship with fellow participant Joey.	
8	Lauren O'Brien & David Bettenburg	No	No	David ended the engagement upon learning after their honeymoon that Lauren was casually hooking up with a different guy shortly before filming. With the information reaching his family and friends, David decided he couldn't get over it and broke up with Lauren. David apologized to her shortly after the breakup, but Lauren did not want to reconcile their relationship.	
9	Kalybriah & Edmond	No	No	At the altar, Kalybriah said no to Edmond. She said that Edmond deserves someone who is 100% ready and that, at the moment, that is not her. At the reunion in October 2025, both said they were single.	
9	Ali & Anton	No	No	At the altar, Ali said no to Anton. She believed that the person Anton had been outside of the pods was not the same person she caught feelings for. Specifically, she pointed out being surprised about his level of drinking, partying, being active, and his healthy eating. At the reunion, Ali declined to reveal her relationship status while Anton said he had been in a relationship for about a year.	
9	Megan W. & Jordan	No	No	Megan broke up with Jordan before their wedding. Megan believed their lifestyles were too different and she would not feel right marrying him. After Jordan left, Megan said she was initially into the idea of him already having a child, but did not think she realized how much of a commitment or how challenging it would be to become a stepmother. At the reunion, Megan revealed that she is in a relationship and is now a mother, and Jordan said he is single.	
9	Madison & Joe	No	No	Joe broke up with Madison shortly after the tuxedo fittings. While not giving a specific reason, Joe did not feel the relationship was working and told her that he would say no if they went to the altar. At the reunion, Madison said she is single and Joe said he is in a relationship.	
9	Annie & Nick	No	No	Nick broke up with Annie due to being unhappy in their relationship. The night before dress and tuxedo fittings, the two had an argument that Nick saw as a breaking point for him. Given their frequent conflicts, Nick said that he did not feel like he could continue their relationship. At the reunion, both said they are single.	
9	Kacie & Patrick	No	No	After becoming engaged, Kacie second guessed her decision and returned to Denver before the honeymoon. In private talks with production, Kacie mentioned that she was not attracted to Patrick and did not believe that she could "get there" with him. Patrick suggested rekindling their relationship in Denver, but post-show interviews indicated this never happened. The interviews also indicated that Kacie realized she was uncomfortable going through a relationship on camera. At the reunion, both said that they are single.	
10	Christine & Victor	Yes	Yes	Married in April 2025	
10	Amber and Jordan	Yes	No	Married in April 2025. During the reunion, it was announced that they separated a few months after filming. Amber explained that Jordan declined to move in together and that she did not feel like he was spending enough time together after getting married, which made her think that he was not ready for marriage. With Jordan, he did not feel like he was appreciated during their marriage.	
10	Ashley and Alex H.	No	No	At the altar, Alex is asked first but Ashley interjects and says that she is saying no. Ashley explains that after leaving the pods, she felt that Alex was putting in no effort into their relationship and compared it to feeling like roommates. During the reunion, it was revealed that they are both single.	
10	Emma and Mike	No	No	At the altar, Emma says yes while Mike says no. A big part of this relationship was Emma's hesitation to having kids and Mike being very adamant about wanting them. While Emma eventually started feeling comfortable about having kids, Mike decided to say no because he wanted to be with someone who was absolutely sure about children. During the reunion, Mike announced that he had gotten into a new relationship.	
10	Brittany W. and Devo	No	No	On the morning of their wedding day, Devo has doubts on whether or not he can love Brittany how she deserves to be. While Brittany frames their conversation as not the end of their relationship and believing they will get married one day, Devo is less sure and not sure exactly how he feels. The two decide to stay in touch and figure their relationship out, but the two did officially break up shortly after filming. During the reunion, it is revealed that Devo is in a new relationship and engaged.	
10	Bri and Connor	No	No	Two days before the weddings, Bri and Connor talk about her reservations with saying yes at the altar. While complimenting him numerous times, Bri brings up how she doesn't think that Connor is getting the best version of herself. During the conversation, Bri says that she is not ready to walk down the aisle, but the two do want see if they can work through it together. The two stated that they were still together during the reunion, but TMZ was told in May 2026 that the two have since split up.	
10	Jessica and Chris	No	No	During a conversation about their communication expectations, Chris asks if Jessica thinks they have a strong physical connection. Chris admits that he's struggling with his attraction to her due to her not working out every day, and then he admits that he's been thinking about what it would have been like if he chose Bri, his other pod connection. Jessica, feeling disrespected and like she was always honest about her lifestyle, decides to leave and go back home. During the reunion, it was revealed that Jessica has since gotten into a relationship with fellow participant Haramol Gill.	
