= Love Is Blind: Italy =

2025 Netflix reality series

- Italian: L'amore è Cieco: Italia
- Genre: Reality
- Created by: Chris Coelen
- Presented by: Benedetta Parodi; Fabio Caressa
- Country of origin: Italy
- Original language: Italian
- No. of seasons: 1
- No. of episodes: 10

Production
- Executive producer: Valentina Bolognesi
- Running time: 57-65 minutes
- Production company: Banijay Italia

Original release
- Network: Netflix
- Release: December 1, 2025 – present

Related
- Love Is Blind

Love Is Blind: Italy (Italian: L'amore è Cieco: Italia) is an Italian reality television series hosted by Benedetta Parodi and Fabio Caressa. It is based on the American show by the same name. The first season premiered on Netflix on December 1, 2025, as part of a three-week event. A reunion episode was released on December 19, 2025.

== Season summary ==
| Couples | Married on the show | Still together | Relationship notes |
|---|---|---|---|
| Hyoni and Alessandro | Yes | Yes | Hyoni and Alessandro got married. At the reunion, they revealed that they were living together and had visited Hyoni's home country, South Korea, together. |
| Karen and Nicola | Yes | Possibly | Karen and Nicola got married, but split ways shortly after due to communication issues and unresolved tension. At the reunion, Karen revealed that she still loved him and he said he wanted her to give him another chance. |
| Gergana and Parmi | No | No | They did not get married at Gergana said no at the altar due to "real-world pressure" and "family considerations". At the reunion, they revealed that while they had briefly reconnected after the show, they split up again due to their paths not being aligned. |
| Ludovica and Davide | No | No | They did not get married as Davide said no at the altar due to a lack of compatibility. (Note: This was despite Ludovica having said yes.) At the reunion, Ludovica said that she had "dodged a bullet" in the end as Davide had been "sleeping with" and occasionally "seeing" a woman he had known from before and who had the keys to his apartment, while he was on the show. |
| Elisa and Alessandro | No | No | They split up before the mixer due to constant disagreements, differences in lifestyles, expectations, and general incompatibility. |
| Giorgia and Giovanni | No | No | Giorgia and Giovanni split up due to clashing views to marriage and intimacy. The show then followed Giovanni on a date with Federica, one of the other women from the pods with whom he had made a connection but had ultimately not proposed to. At the reunion, it was revealed that they too had since broken up. |

== Participants ==
Participants from the first season were revealed a few days before the episode.

| Name | Age | Job | Relationship Status |
|---|---|---|---|
| Hyoni Song | 34 | Project Manager | Married |
| Alessandro Bianchin | 34 | Model and Personal Trainer | Married |
| Karen Norman | 35 | Tattoo Artist | Split after the wedding |
| Nicola Botticini | 30 | Salesman | Split after the wedding |
| Gergana Lazarova | 30 | Store Manager | Split at the wedding |
| Parmi Singh | 34 | Restauranteur | Split at the wedding |
| Ludovica Maria Capello | 31 | E-Commerce Business Owner | Split at the wedding |
| Davide Aulicio | 37 | Insurer | Split at the wedding |
| Elisa Vago | 30 | Manager | Split before the wedding |
| Alessandro Albero | 26 | Film Machinist | Split before the wedding |
| Giorgia Paselli | 35 | Genetic Biologist | Split before the wedding |
| Giovanni Calvario | 36 | Event Planner | Split before the wedding |
| Alessandra Aubry | 35 | Data Annotator | Not Engaged |
| Alessandro Beppi | 43 | Engineer | Not Engaged |
| Alvise Faraon | 33 | Podcaster | Not Engaged |
| Amira Ramadan | 36 | Secretary | Not Engaged |
| Andrea Dell'Olio | 37 | Violinist | Not Engaged |
| Davide Castoldi | 39 | Racing Driver | Not Engaged |
| Federica Viola Stella | 38 | Secretary | Not Engaged |
| Federico Bellodi | 30 | Hotelier | Not Engaged |
| Fiore Davoli | 29 | Entrepreneur | Not Engaged |
| Giorgio Cataldo | 29 | Makeup Artist | Not Engaged |
| Maria Jin | 30 | Office Worker | Not Engaged |
| Mariam Gargiulo | 28 | Student | Not Engaged |
| Michele Carfona | 32 | Banker | Not Engaged |
| Riccardo Luciani | 29 | Representative | Not Engaged |
| Stefano Ferreri | 37 | Personal Trainer | Not Engaged |
| Talitha Dittfeld | 34 | Start Up Owner | Not Engaged |

== Episodes ==
Love Is Blind: Italy season 1 episodes
| No. | Title | Original release date |
|---|---|---|
Week 1
| 1 | "The Pods Are Now Open" | December 1, 2025 |
| 2 | "It's Always Been You" | December 1, 2025 |
| 3 | "I've Never Had a Christmas Tree" | December 1, 2025 |
| 4 | "The First Night... On The Couch" | December 1, 2025 |
Week 2
| 5 | "Moving In Together" | December 8, 2025 |
| 6 | "I Left My Keys With A Friend" | December 8, 2025 |
| 7 | "Breaking Up To Avoid Pain" | December 8, 2025 |
| 8 | "The Big Day Approaches" | December 8, 2025 |
Week 3
| 9 | "The Weddings: Is Love Truly Blind?" | December 15, 2025 |
Special
| 10 | "The Reunion" | December 19, 2025 |

== Production ==
The season was filmed across Milan, Italy, and Agadir, Morocco. The casting call for the show was released on October 9, 2024.
