= Love Is Blind (American TV series) =

American reality television series (2020–present)

- Genre: Reality
- Created by: Chris Coelen
- Presented by: Nick Lachey; Vanessa Lachey
- Starring: Love Is Blind participants
- Country of origin: United States
- Original language: English
- No. of seasons: 11
- No. of episodes: 149 (list of episodes)

Production
- Executive producers: Chris Coelen; Ally Simpson; Eric Detwiler; Brent Gauches; Brian Smith; Heather Crowe
- Running time: 48–104 minutes
- Production company: Kinetic Content

Original release
- Network: Netflix
- Release: February 13, 2020 – present

Related
- Love Is Blind

Love Is Blind is a reality television series on Netflix created by Chris Coelen and produced by Kinetic Content which ranks as the number one most-watched streaming original series of all time, in terms of total appearances on the Nielsen Streaming Top 10, and as the top unscripted streaming program of all time. Described as a social experiment where single men and women look for love and get engaged, all before meeting in person, the series has received mostly positive reviews from critics, winning three Critics Choice Awards and receiving six Critics Choice nominations, in addition to garnering six Emmy nominations as Outstanding Structured Reality Program.

Originally premiering on February 13, 2020, Love Is Blind has aired for ten seasons in the United States and also been produced in eleven other territories around the world including, Brazil, Japan, Sweden, United Kingdom, Germany, Argentina, Mexico, UAE, France, Poland, and Italy. Canadian, South African and Dutch editions of the show are also slated to release in 2026 and 2027.

== Format ==
The series follows an equal number of men and women hoping to find love. For 10 days, the men and women date each other in purpose-built "pods", small rooms where they can talk to each other by speaker but not see each other, except through a blue translucent barrier that allows no visual detail. The cast members are initially paired in a speed-dating format, but later can choose to have longer dates. The daters may extend a marriage proposal whenever they feel ready. A couple meets face-to-face only after a marriage proposal is accepted. The engaged couples then head to a couples' retreat at a resort for one week. During this trip, they spend time getting to know each other and have their first opportunity to be physically intimate. They also meet the other couples participating in the experiment. This format of choosing among suitors without being able to see them has been compared to The Dating Game.

After the couples' retreat, the engaged couples move to an apartment complex in the city where they live for the final three weeks of the experiment. At the apartments, they meet their partners' friends and families and learn more about their partners' lives, exploring issues such as finances, recreation, personal habits, and their ultimate primary residence. They also plan weddings to be held at the end of four weeks. During this wedding planning period, the women go wedding dress shopping and the men go suit shopping together, bringing a few friends or family members along. They also make choices such as the design and flavor of their wedding cake. At the altar, each participant decides whether to say "I do" and get legally married.

Each season also has a reunion special released after the final episode.

== Production ==
=== Casting ===
The casting team receives applications but also seeks people out on social media and at bars, grocery stores, and church groups. A third-party company conducts background checks and psychological evaluations, and the casting team tries to create a pool of participants in which each person has some compatibility, on paper, with others.

=== Production process ===
Production in the pods takes place in a 68,000-square-foot studio documented by 81 cameras. Participants begin with 10-minute speed dates, which lengthen each day. As the process continues, the participants can choose to date for hours on end, sometimes until 3 a.m. Members of the production team listen on headsets but do not interfere with the dates.

Participants relay who they'd like to date, and then executive producer and creator Chris Coelen and executive producer Ally Simpson use a formula inspired by the Gale–Shapley algorithm to find a dating schedule in which everyone has matches. For the first four seasons, Coelen and Simpson organized the data by hand, but in subsequent seasons, they utilized computer software.

In the pods, couples typically spend at least 30 hours dating in separate rooms before deciding whether to propose. If a couple gets engaged, they meet.

=== Filming locations ===
Filming for the first season took place in Atlanta, Georgia, from October 9, 2018, and lasted 38 days up until the weddings. The couples met face-to-face on October 19. The ten days in the pods were shot at Pinewood Atlanta Studios in Fayetteville, Georgia. After the engaged couples left the pods, filming took place at the Grand Velas Riviera Maya in Playa del Carmen, Mexico, when the couples went on a retreat. The couples that made it through the retreat moved in together in an apartment complex. After the retreat, the couples headed back to Atlanta to the Spectrum on Spring apartment building, where they spent the rest of the time filming up until the weddings. The weddings took place at two event spaces, Flourish Atlanta and The Estate, on November 15.

For the show's second series, the pods were shipped from Georgia to be filmed in a newly built studio in Santa Clarita, California.

For the show's eighth season, the couples went to Honduras for their retreat and headed back to an apartment complex in Minneapolis filming until the weddings happened.

=== Initial release and subsequent orders ===
The first five episodes of Love Is Blind's first season were released on February 13, 2020, the next four on February 20, and the finale on February 27. On February 26, Netflix announced a reunion special available on YouTube on March 5.

As of January 2025, Love Is Blind has been renewed through Season 10.

=== Unaired engagements ===
During most seasons, there have been couples who got engaged in the pods but were not featured on the show. Some unaired engaged couples were filmed beyond their time in the pods, and one couple in season 5 was filmed all the way up to the altar, but their relationship was not included in the series.

== Episodes ==
Season	Episodes	Originally released		Location
Season	Episodes	First released	Last released	Location
1	14	February 13, 2020	July 28, 2021	Atlanta
2	14	February 11, 2022	September 16, 2022	Chicago
3	15	October 19, 2022	February 10, 2023	Dallas
4	16	March 24, 2023	September 1, 2023	Seattle
5	11	September 22, 2023	October 15, 2023	Houston
6	13	February 14, 2024	March 13, 2024	Charlotte
7	13	October 2, 2024	October 30, 2024	Washington, D.C.
8	14	February 14, 2025	March 9, 2025	Minneapolis–Saint Paul
9	13	October 1, 2025	October 29, 2025	Denver
10	13	February 11, 2026	March 11, 2026	Ohio
11	13	October 14, 2026	November 8, 2026	Boston

== Reception ==
=== Viewership ===
Netflix reported 30 million households had watched the series within four weeks after premiere, and as reported in the Netflix 2020 viewing trends summary, Love Is Blind season one "stayed in the US Top 10 for 47 days straight after its release in February – the second-longest run of any title (in 2020) behind Cocomelon at 64 days. But unlike preschoolers, adults don't tend to watch the same shows over and over again!"

In 2020, the first season of Love Is Blind became Netflix's number-one trending program, coinciding with the COVID-19 pandemic. Nielsen reported Love Is Blind delivered 1.5 million viewers for the first five episodes, 1.3 million for the next four episodes, and 829,000 for the finale episode in its first full week. As of November 19, 2026, the reunion episode had been viewed by almost 2.5 million viewers on YouTube alone.

In 2022, Love Is Blind spent 86 days in the Netflix US Top Ten, more than any series other than Cocomelon, Stranger Things and Ozark. In 2023, Love Is Blind spent more days in the Netflix US Top Ten than any other series except Suits.

In both 2022 and 2023, Love Is Blind was the #1 most-watched and only unscripted program to rank in Nielsen's list of Top Ten Original Streaming Programs, measuring the most popular programs in America across the year, with each year accumulating 13.1 billion minutes viewed. Love Is Blind ranked as the #5 overall Original Streaming Program in 2023, growing from a #8 overall Original Streaming Program ranking in 2022.

In 2024, the sixth season of Love Is Blind delivered the biggest viewership for a premiere week in franchise history, building on successive franchise bests in each of Season Four, Season Three, and Season Two, and nearly doubling the next most-watched original program.

=== Critical response ===
The review aggregator Rotten Tomatoes reports an approval rating of 74% based on 23 reviews, with an average rating of 5.75/10. The website's critical consensus reads: "Addictive, but problematic, Love Is Blind is undoubtedly an intoxicating binge, but its version of romance often comes off more toxic than aspirational." Metacritic, which uses a weighted average, assigned a score of 62 out of 100 based on nine critics, indicating "generally favorable reviews".

Daniel D'Addario of Variety writes that "Love is Blind, the smash dating series," is, along with The Ultimatum, "the new standard-bearers for romantic reality TV." D'Addario says that creator Chris Coelen's shows "escalate from relatively simple set-ups to wild heights of human behavior, all because contestants are (or appear to be) left to their own devices."

Brett White of Decider states Love is Blind is a "fascinating relationship study, with all the drama you love." White says, "Season 1 was a reality show car crash, the likes of which we'd never seen before. Season 2 didn't have the newness working in its favor, so it went full-on bananas and gave us perhaps the most chaotic reality TV season on Netflix. Now we're at Season 3 and...Love Is Blind may have become a well-crafted reality show – nay, a docuseries – about the incredibly complex, at times confusing, sometimes dangerous world of love."

Lucy Mangan of The Guardian writes that Love is Blind "is, basically, crack. Or meth. It's crack-meth. You will decide to give it five minutes before bed one night and find yourself still on the sofa as the sun rises on another day. You will be bleary-eyed and shattered from all the shouting you have done, the emotional investment you have made, the WhatsApp messages you have typed to a specially formed group and the heartfelt contributions you have made to various internet forums on the subject. It's that good, is what I am saying."

The Forward described the show as one that the Talmud warns against, in that it subjects individual participants to public humiliation.

Yohana Delta of Vanity Fair calls Love is Blind "an emotional thrill ride from start to finish."

Writing in Skeptical Inquirer, Craig Foster and Minjung Park raised concerns about the way in which the program poses hypotheses and then conducts experiments with small sample sizes of participants who are not assigned to either an experimental or a control group. This does not allow a genuine examination of the independent variable and poses a problem if social scientists want to test the suppositions because they would be constrained by ethical considerations if they attempted to recreate anything like the show. The article concluded that while the show can be enjoyed as reality television that dramatises relationships, it is "important to recognize that real science involves a careful and ethical process conducted by experts who scrutinize each other's work."

The series has been compared to Married at First Sight, also produced by Kinetic Content, and The Bachelor.

=== Outcomes for participants ===
Roughly 85% of accepted marriage proposals in the United States result in a wedding. In Love Is Blind, 18% of accepted proposals result in a marriage. Of the 72% of LiB accepted proposals that fall apart, 54% break up before the wedding, and 46% break up at the altar.

The percentage marrieds in the United States whose marriage lasts for 6 years or longer is about 78%. The percentage of LiB marrieds who last anywhere between 0 and 6 years is 50% (counting all marriages in seasons 1-10). 14% of accepted LiB proposals have resulted in lasting marriages.

=== Impact on popular culture ===
Andy Dehnart of reality blurred stated Love Is Blind "is one of the biggest reality shows, in terms of cultural conversation, in years."

Alexander Kacala at Today called Love Is Blind the "bingeworthy obsession that has taken America by storm."

Georgia Aspinall of Grazia writes, "the internet is obsessed with Love Is Blind."

Julia Jacobs of The New York Times writes that "Kim Kardashian, Lizzo, Billie Eilish, and Daniel Radcliffe are among the show's celebrity fans, and contestants have built gigantic social media followings, with one married participant from season 1, Lauren Speed-Hamilton, reaching 2.5 million followers on Instagram."

== Controversies ==
=== Season 4 reunion ===
Netflix announced that Season 4 would feature a live reunion, but due to technical difficulties, the reunion was delayed by 90 minutes and subsequently released as a recorded video rather than a live broadcast.

=== Allegations of cast mistreatment ===
Three former cast members filed lawsuits against Netflix and production companies Kinetic Content and Delirium TV.

In July 2022, season 2 contestants Jeremy Hartwell and Nick Thompson alleged the cast were regularly denied food and water. Hartwell filed a lawsuit claiming "inhumane working conditions." Danielle Ruhl, whom Thompson married during filming, alleged she informed producers she was having thoughts of suicide and asked to leave. Series creator Chris Coelen has denied these allegations, stating participants are free to leave at any time. In October 2023, a season 5 contestant, who was not featured in any episodes of the series, filed a lawsuit alleging sexual assault, false imprisonment, and negligence, while cast member Renee Poche alleged her fiancé was abusive and that production did not protect her when she informed them.

Netflix and Delirium TV have filed an arbitration against Poche to obtain $4 million from her, alleging that she breached her NDA. Poche, who earned a total of $8000 from her participation in the show, filed a lawsuit to nullify the contract and claim intentional infliction of emotional distress in addition to violations of California's labor code. In 2024, the National Labor Relations Board issued a complaint that the show's producers had misclassified the contestants as participants rather than as employees. The LA Times described the complaint as representing, "a significant step forward in the efforts by some unscripted talent to unionize."

== Accolades ==
Accolades for Love Is Blind
Year	Award	Category	Nominee(s)	Result
2020	Critics' Choice Real TV Awards	Best Relationship Show	Chris Coelen, Sam Dean, Ally Simpson, Eric Detwiler, Brian Smith, Stefanie Cohen Williams and Brent Gauches	Won
2020	Primetime Creative Arts Emmy Awards	Outstanding Structured Reality Program	Chris Coelen, Sam Dean, Ally Simpson, Eric Detwiler, Brian Smith, Stefanie Cohen Williams, Brent Gauches and Jeff Keirns	Nominated
2020	Primetime Creative Arts Emmy Awards	Outstanding Casting for a Reality Program	Donna Driscoll, Kelly Zack Castillo, and Megan Feldman	Nominated
2020	People's Choice Awards	Reality Show of the Year	Love Is Blind	Nominated
2020	People's Choice Awards	Bingeworthy Show of the Year	Love Is Blind	Nominated
2020	Grierson Awards	Best Entertaining Documentary	Production team at Kinetic Content	Nominated
2022	Critics' Choice Real TV Awards	Best Relationship Show	Chris Coelen, Ally Simpson, Eric Detwiler, Kimberly Goodman, Brian Smith, Jill Goslicky, and Leif Lindhjem	Won
2022	Primetime Creative Arts Emmy Awards	Outstanding Structured Reality Program	Chris Coelen, Ally Simpson, Eric Detwiler, Kimberly Goodman, Brian Smith, Jill Goslicky, and Leif Lindhjem	Nominated
2023	Critics' Choice Real TV Awards	Best Relationship Show	Chris Coelen, Ally Simpson, Eric Detwiler, Brent Gauches and Brian Smith	Won
2023	Primetime Creative Arts Emmy Awards	Outstanding Structured Reality Program	Chris Coelen, Ally Simpson, Eric Detwiler, Brent Gauches and Brian Smith	Nominated
2023	Primetime Creative Arts Emmy Awards	Outstanding Casting for a Reality Program	Donna Driscoll, Stephanie Lewis, and Claire Loeb	Nominated
2024	Critics' Choice Real TV Awards	Best Relationship Show	Chris Coelen, Ally Simpson, Eric Detwiler, Brent Gauches and Brian Smith	Nominated
2024	Primetime Creative Arts Emmy Awards	Outstanding Structured Reality Program	Chris Coelen, Ally Simpson, Eric Detwiler, Brent Gauches, Brian Smith, Stefanie Cohen Williams, Morgan Harris, Ewa Mularczyk, and Michelle Thomas	Nominated
2025	Critics' Choice Real TV Awards	Best Relationship Show	Chris Coelen, Ally Simpson, Eric Detwiler, Brent Gauches and Brian Smith	Nominated
2025	Primetime Creative Arts Emmy Awards	Outstanding Structured Reality Program	Chris Coelen, Ally Simpson, Eric Detwiler, Brent Gauches, Brian Smith, Stefanie Cohen Williams, Morgan Harris, Ewa Mularczyk, and Michelle Thomas	Nominated
2026	Critics' Choice Real TV Awards	Best Structured Series	Chris Coelen, Ally Simpson, Eric Detwiler, Brent Gauches and Brian Smith	Nominated
2026	Primetime Creative Arts Emmy Awards	Outstanding Structured Reality Program	Chris Coelen, Ally Simpson, Eric Detwiler, Morgan Harris, Brian Smith, Stefanie Cohen Williams, Nieshia Crawford, Ewa Mularczyk, and Michelle Thomas	Nominated

== See also ==
- Sexy Beasts, a dating program on Netflix with a similar premise of disguising contestants' looks with prosthetics and make-up.
- Married at First Sight, a dating program on Peacock where participants marry strangers for a period of eight to ten weeks before they must choose to divorce or stay married.
- Perfect Match, a dating program where former dating reality television contestants pair up and compete in challenges as they aim to become the most compatible match.
