= Frances Berwick =

British television professional

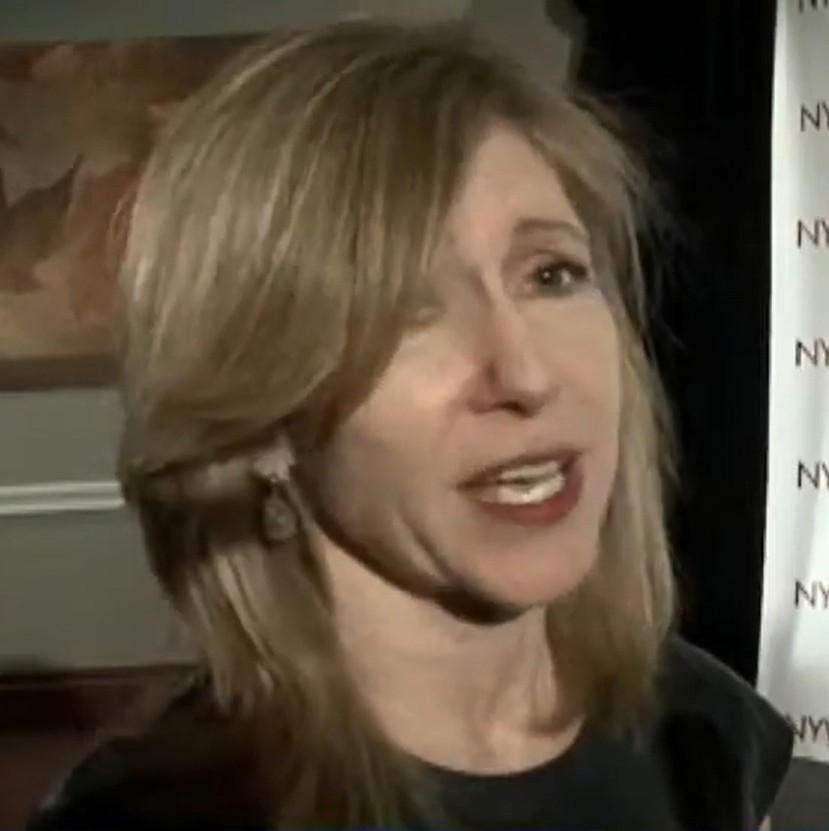
Berwick in 2014

Frances Berwick is a British television professional. She is Chairman, Bravo and the Unscripted division of Peacock.

== Career ==
Berwick started her career at Channel 4, where she worked on publicity and operations. Part of her role included shipping tapes of programming overseas as part of the channel's expansion of international syndication.

Berwick later worked as vice president of programming at Bravo. When Bravo was acquired by NBCUniversal, Berwick became general manager, and later president, of the network. Berwick is credited with helping build Bravo into a powerhouse of unscripted television.

Berwick held numerous other roles within NBCUniversal, and in 2020, was promoted to chairman of entertainment networks for NBCUniversal TV and Streaming. As chairman, Berwick oversaw program strategy and business operations for NBC, the company's flagship broadcast network, and NBCU's six cable entertainment networks, USA Network, Bravo, E!, Oxygen True Crime, SYFY and Universal Kids.

In 2025, Berwick was announced as chairman, Bravo and Peacock unscripted as part of a larger restructuring of NBCUniversal's television entertainment division. The role was announced to include documentaries and true crime content exclusively for Peacock, in addition to Bravo content.

== Personal life ==
Berwick has a master's degree from Edinburgh University. She lives in Manhattan with her husband and son.

== Awards ==
As of 2023, Berwick had been nominated for 31 Emmys, and won four:

Year	Award	Role	Refs
2001	Primetime Emmy Award for Outstanding Variety, Music Or Comedy Special	Producer for Bravo, Cirque Du Soleil's Dralion	
2004	Primetime Emmy Award of Outstanding Reality Program	Executive Producer, Queer Eye for the Straight Guy	
2007	Primetime Emmy Award of Outstanding Reality Program	Executive Producer, Kathy Griffin: My Life on the D-List	
2008	Primetime Emmy Award of Outstanding Reality Program	Executive Producer, Kathy Griffin: My Life on the D-List	
