= Love Is Blind: Argentina season 1 =

2024 Netflix reality series

Love Is Blind: Argentina
- Season 1
- Presented by: Wanda Nara; Darío Barassi
- No. of episodes: 11

Release
- Original network: Netflix
- Original release: November 6 – November 28, 2024

The first season of Love Is Blind: Argentina, premiered on Netflix from November 6, 2024 to November 20, 2024, as a three-week event hosted by Wanda Nara and Darío Barassi. This was the first Love is Blind spin-off hosted by two people not in a relationship.

The reunion episode was aired on November 28, 2024.

== Season summary ==
Couples	Married	Still together	Relationship notes
Florencia and José	Yes	No	Florencia and José got engaged later in the show and, as such, were unable to attend the retreat in Tulum. They did get married on the show, but separated in May 2025.
Emily and Santiago	Yes	No	Emily and Santiago got married. In February 2025, they announced their separation after he physically attacked her. In April 2026, he was sentenced to 15 years in prison for attempting to kill her.
Julieta and Ezequiel	Yes	No	Julieta and Ezequiel got married, but did not move in together. At the reunion, they revealed they had split ways after the show but continued to remain good friends.
María and Mauricio	No	No	They did not get married as María said "no" at the altar due to Mauricio's "lack of effective accountability and behavior patterns". The couple hugged at the altar and then parted ways.
Florfi and Tom	No	No	They left the show before the wedding-day fittings as Florfi felt she needed more time with Tom before committing to marriage. At the reunion they revealed that they had split up but were still close and in contact.
Eva and Roberto	No	No	They split up during the post-pod honeymoons due to the differences in their personalities. At the reunion, Roberto revealed that he had started dating fellow participant Agustina.

== Participants ==
The participants for this season were announced a few days before the show began.

Name	Age	Occupation	Relationship status
Florencia Fernández	28	Accountant	Split after the wedding
José Luis Fariña	30	Event host	Split after the wedding
Julieta Fennema	23	Cellphone technician	Split after the wedding
Ezequiel Ingrassia	32	Businessman	Split after the wedding
Emily Ceco	24	Journalism student	Split after the wedding
Santiago Martínez	29	Businessman	Split after the wedding
María Emilia Merlo	41	Lawyer	Split at the wedding
Mauricio Zappacosta	42	Fashion designer	Split at the wedding
Florfi Frers	27	Personal trainer	Split before the wedding
Tomás "Tom" Martorello	27	Publicist	Split before the wedding
Evangelina Novo	29	Lawyer	Split before the wedding
Roberto Marsicano	28	Rancher	Split before the wedding
Brenda Oviedo	34	Administrative consultant	Briefly engaged off-camera, split before the wedding
Matías Moreno	36	Administrative employee	Briefly engaged off-camera, split before the wedding
Agustina Pontoriero	29	Administrative employee	Not engaged
Camila Pittaluga	29	Yoga instructor	Not engaged
Érica Sánchez	34	Administrator	Not engaged
Fernando Marangoni	34	Businessman	Not engaged
Franco Ferrer	27	Lifeguard	Not engaged
Jerónimo Madero	35	DJ	Not engaged
Leo Yovanovich	35	Tango teacher	Not engaged
Macarena Moroño	31	Lawyer	Not engaged
Malena Lollo	23	Music teacher	Not engaged
Mane Caballero	35	Psychologist	Not engaged
Mercedes Bouzon	29	Marketing consultant	Not engaged
Marino Morduchowicz	45	Broadcaster/audiovisual producer	Not engaged
Martina Mateini	34	Entrepreneur	Not engaged
Máximo Austi	31	Digital marketing	Not engaged
Nicolás García	29	Event planner	Not engaged
Sofía Iorio	28	HR recruiter	Not engaged
Tomás Cohen	35	Digital marketing entrepreneur	Not engaged
Tomi Santos	27	Political consultant	Not engaged

== Episodes ==
Love Is Blind: Argentina season 1 episodes
No.	Title	Original release date
Week 1
1	"The Love of My Life"	November 6, 2024
2	"Three's A Crowd"	November 6, 2024
3	"The Face Behind The Voice"	November 6, 2024
4	"Sun. Sand. Sparks."	November 6, 2024
Week 2
5	"Trouble In Paradise"	November 13, 2024
6	"Bumps In The Road"	November 13, 2024
7	"Keeping It Together"	November 13, 2024
8	"One Week Till The Wedding"	November 13, 2024
Week 3
9	"Ghosts From Pods' Past"	November 20, 2024
10	"What If I Do Is I Don't?"	November 20, 2024
Special
11	"The Reunion"	November 28, 2024

== Production ==
The pods and retreat were filmed in Mexico City and Tulúm, respectively. The rest of the season was shot in Buenos Aires, which is the hometown of many of the participants.
