= Chris Coelen =

American television creator

- Born: 1968 (age 57–58); New Brunswick, New Jersey
- Occupation: Television producer

Chris Coelen (born 1968) is an American television creator and producer who has been heralded "Reality's Biggest Hitmaker." He created and produces Love Is Blind, which ranks as the top unscripted series of all time, in addition to creating and producing The Ultimatum, Perfect Match, Making Love and the American version of Married at First Sight.

Coelen is the founder and CEO of Kinetic Content, which launched in 2010, and was acquired by European Broadcast group ProSiebenSat.1 Media later that year. Peter Chernin's North Road Company acquired Kinetic in July, 2022, which was acquired by Mediawan in January 2026.

== Early life ==
Coelen was born in 1968 in New Brunswick, New Jersey, and was raised in Massachusetts in a family with multi-cultural heritage, including his mother's Native American background, his father's Dutch-Irish background, and his siblings of Vietnamese and Korean descent.

== Career ==
=== Fox Entertainment News ===
While in college, Coelen aimed to be a journalist and interned at Fox Broadcasting Company's Fox Entertainment News, which produced a daily business-focused entertainment news program. Moving to Los Angeles at 21, he was hired on staff at Fox as a news producer after procuring an interview with Kelsey Grammer, who was appearing in court on drug charges.

=== Agency for the Performing Arts ===
In 1992, Coelen joined the Agency for the Performing Arts (now Independent Artist Group) and began representing on-air talent. His first client was a morning news anchor in Myrtle Beach, South Carolina. His roster grew to include Martha Quinn, Rex Reed, Maty Monfort, Jane Wallace, and Ryan Seacrest.

=== United Talent Agency ===
In 1996, Coelen joined United Talent Agency (UTA), becoming a member of the talent department. In 2001, coinciding with the American emergence of Survivor, Coelen created the Alternative Department and subsequently became a partner at the agency.

At UTA, Coelen represented producer clients such as Stan Lee (the chairman emeritus of Marvel Comics), Michael Davies (Who Wants To Be A Millionaire), R. J. Cutler (American High), Thom Beers (Monster Garage), Craig Piligian (Survivor), Cris Abrego, Mark Cronin, Joel Gallen (America: A Tribute to Heroes, MTV Movie & TV Awards), Gay Rosenthal (Behind the Music), Bill Guttentag (Crime & Punishment), Andrew Glassman (The Wall), Stuart Krasnow (Weakest Link), World of Wonder (RuPaul's Drag Race), Evolution Media (The Real Housewives of Orange County), and publisher Judith Regan.

Having been exposed to British TV shows like The Word, The Big Breakfast, and TFI Friday, Coelen stated, "I couldn't work out why there was nothing like it on TV in the US." He expanded his client base to include British production companies like Red Production Company, Shed Productions, Wall to Wall Media, Monkey Kingdom, Maverick Television, Objective Media Group, Avalon, Ricochet and RDF Media, leading UTA to become known as "the agency of choice for UK Indies." In 2005, Colin Robertson from Broadcast described Coelen as "an alarmingly youthful bloke who looks as if he’d rather be perched on a surfboard than sitting in an air-conditioned office, (he) is a huge fan of British producers."

Coelen represented international personalities such as Graham Norton, Derren Brown, and Jo Frost, and he expanded beyond the UK, representing companies in Holland (Absolutely Independent), Sweden (Strix) and New Zealand's Julie Christie (Touchdown Television). Said Coelen, "There are smart TV producers in every market in the world. The U.S. doesn't have a lock on that."

Coelen's client roster included American talent including Jessica Simpson, Ryan Seacrest, Pamela Anderson, Trading Spaces host Paige Davis, Ken Jennings, Carmen Electra, Michael Weatherly, and Paget Brewster.

While at UTA, Coelen helped package over five dozen projects including Wife Swap, Supernanny, Average Joe, The Simple Life, Newlyweds: Nick and Jessica, Worst Case Scenario, The Residents, Stripperella, Law & Order: Crime & Punishment (with agency client Dick Wolf).

As an agent, Coelen came up with the concept for The Surreal Life, introduced his clients, Mark Cronin and Cris Abrego (and Abrego's then-producing partner, Rick Telles), to one another, and pitched the idea to them as a vehicle for them to produce together. The show was sold to the WB and subsequently to VH1.

=== RDF USA ===
In 2006, Coelen joined RDF as the CEO of RDF USA (now Zodiak Media), which had been one of his clients at UTA. Coelen stated, "As an agent you can't produce...I was drawn by the opportunity to be a vested part of this business, to be on the same team as the people that I was representing.”

Coelen was hired by Stephen Lambert, RDF's chief creative officer and David Frank, RDF's CEO, Coelen was given the task of expanding the firm’s North American business and was its first corporate employee in the U.S.; he oversaw and sold more than 30 shows to American networks and cable channels including Wife Swap, Secret Millionaire, Don't Forget the Lyrics, Hitched or Ditched, Addicted to Beauty, Find My Family, How To Look Good Naked, The Two Coreys, Hardcore Pawn, and One Big Happy Family

While at RDF, Coelen expanded the company's activities to include a management company, Pangea Management Group.

In May 2007, ABC announced plans to re-order Wife Swap and put it into syndication.

In June 2007, Pangea joined in a partnership with Bravo to manage the careers of its reality talent, in an effort to boost the careers of talent appearing in the network’s programming. In announcing the deal, Frances Berwick, GM of Bravo, said Bravo partnered with Pangea because they were getting "requests for these people: advertisers; networks who wanted experts on-air; personal appearances, consumer products -- stuff [the contestants] should be making money on, frankly." Bravo President Lauren Zalaznick said, “While television is at our core and will always be the heart of what we do, Bravo Media extends that content and brand to every platform to suit our passionate consumers’ lifestyles.” Coelen added “Bravo is really smart and forward-thinking" and "it's a way to capitalize on the show's brand." Pangea's clients included chefs such as Richard Blais and Brian Malarkey.

In July 2007, Don't Forget the Lyrics premiered on Fox and became the number one show in its time slot.

In 2008, Coelen was elected to the NATPE board, serving with co-chairs Kevin Beggs and Roma Khanna.

In December 2008, Secret Millionaire premiered on Fox, featuring wealthy individuals who live incognito in everyday neighborhoods, deciding whether to give up to $100,000 of their own money to deserving residents. Coelen sold a second season to ABC in 2009.

In 2009, Omnicom Group and RDF formed a "first-of-its-kind strategic venture" with RDF serving as OMG’s exclusive content-creation partner in all areas except sports and minority programming. As part of the venture, RDF acquired a majority shareholding in Full Circle Entertainment, headed by branded entertainment veteran Robert Riesenberg, who reported to Coelen. Coelen stated, "The huge thrust of the deal is about content creation. With all of the things that are happening in the business — the economy, the TiVo effect and declining viewership — the role of the advertiser has never been more important.” Steve Grubbs, chief executive of Omnicom Media Group’s entertainment and sports division, stated ““This alignment with RDF gives us a direct line into a major production and distribution company, which will help us create content that will directly tie our clients’ brands into that content”

In 2009, RDF expanded Coelen's responsibilities, naming him Group Director of North America.

In 2009, TelevisionWeek named Coelen one of its "12 To Watch" in regard to his impact on the media industry, alongside Oprah Winfrey, Jason Kilar, Les Moonves, Jay Leno, and Barack Obama.

Coelen left RDF in December 2009 amid reports of a clash with UK management.

=== Kinetic Content ===
In March 2010, Coelen founded Kinetic Content, personally financing the company and announcing a formal launch in April 2010 at MIPTV in Cannes. He said he envisioned the company being “creatively led and being very, very robust from a creative perspective.”

Coelen immediately established exclusive programming ventures with UK broadcasters Channel 4 and STV, plus exclusive deals with the new company of Survivor creator Charlie Parsons as well as the Dutch company Absolutely Independent.

In September 2010, Coelen sold a 51% stake in Kinetic to ProSiebenSat.1 Media, Europe’s second largest broadcast group, giving Kinetic access to 30 networks in 16 countries, including Germany, Belgium, Denmark, Finland, Netherlands, Sweden and Norway, and became part of the Red Arrow Entertainment Group.

In 2011, Coelen led the Advisory Board for the Factual Entertainment Forum, the precursor to media industry conference Realscreen West, along with Rob Sharenow and Sharon Levy.

At the end of 2011, Coelen launched Kinetic's first broadcast network series, You Deserve It, in collaboration with Deal or No Deal creator Dick de Rijk. You Deserve It aired on ABC and was hosted by Chris Harrison.

In January 2012, Coelen teamed with Betty White to launch Betty White's Off Their Rockers on NBC, based on the Belgian format Benidorm Bastards.

In January 2013, The Taste premiered on ABC in January 2013. Coelen teamed with fellow Executive Producers Anthony Bourdain and Nigella Lawson to sell The Taste; and built the food-based competition-elimination program around Bourdain. Coelen and his team integrated advertisers including Hellmann’s/Best Foods and Ford, along with trade-out partners Williams-Sonoma, Whole Foods Market, Alamos and Southwest Airlines. Featuring chefs including Ludo Lefebvre, Marcus Samuelsson, Brian Malarkey, José Andrés and others, The Taste ran for three seasons on ABC, and the format was produced for Channel 4 in the UK in 2014.

In May 2014, with Coelen as Executive Producer, Little Women: LA launched on Lifetime with high ratings and was immediately re-ordered, Little Women: LA ultimately ran eight seasons and spawned several spin-offs including the highly-rated Little Women: Atlanta, Little Women: New York, Little Women: Dallas and Terra's Little Family.

In July 2014, Married at First Sight launched on the fyi network. It scored record ratings and was immediately moved to AETN's larger networks.

In 2018, Coelen created Love Is Blind and sold it to Netflix.

By 2019, Red Arrow bought out the entirety of Kinetic, and Coelen extended his deal to continue as Kinetic's CEO.

In February 2020, Love Is Blind premiered and was immediately ranked as the number one show on the platform. Alex Abad-Santos of VOX wrote that “according to Netflix, it is the most viewed program—show or series—in the United States right now. Love Is Blind’s contestants and their triumphs and follies have become part of a national conversation.”

In August 2020, Married at First Sight received a six-season guaranteed order from Lifetime in what was described as one of the "largest orders ever" for a television show.

In April 2022, The Ultimatum: Marry or Move On, also created by Coelen, premiered on Netflix.

In July 2022, Kinetic was acquired by Peter Chernin's North Road, as part of the launch of a new premium content company.

Also in July 2022, Coelen launched Claim to Fame on ABC/Hulu.

In February 2023, Perfect Match, created by Coelen, launched on Netflix.

In May 2023, The Ultimatum: Queer Love, created by Coelen, premiered on Netflix.

In January 2025, Married at First Sight moved to Peacock in a competitive situation, landing what Variety called a "massive three-season order" and the show launched on Peacock in October 2025.

In March 2026, Paramount+ announced the 2027 premiere of Making Love, created by Coelen, its "first major statement in the reality TV space...since David Ellison’s Skydance took control of the studio and installed Cindy Holland as Chair of Direct-to-Consumer and Jane Wiseman as Head of Originals."

== Production approach ==
Kathryn VanArendonk of Vulture wrote that "Coelen insists Love Is Blind is more an experiment than a traditional reality show. Its grip on formula is looser: There are no rote, predesigned outcomes, and participants go back to their home cities and spend time with their real friends and family. There are fewer pre-built sets and organized interactions because the cameras are meant to simply follow the cast. Conversations happen more organically, and Coelen insists producers try not to interfere."

Emily Longeretta of Variety quotes Coelen, "We don’t take the opportunity to make these shows for granted, and I think that pays off...It’s really, really hard and time consuming, but ultimately, I think the quality of our storytelling stands up against any series — scripted or non-scripted. I’m really proud of the shows we do and the way we produce them."

== Reception ==
=== Viewership ===
Love Is Blind is the top unscripted streaming series of all time, per Nielsen, and the top streaming original series of all time of any genre, in terms of total appearances in the Nielsen Streaming Top Ten. In the decade of the 2020s, Love Is Blind was more highly watched than any original series other than Stranger Things and Ozark.

In 2022, Coelen had two separate series hit #1 on the Netflix US rankings (Love Is Blind and The Ultimatum: Marry or Move On), one of only three producers to accomplish this feat (Shonda Rhimes & Ryan Murphy are the others). In 2023, Coelen had two more series hit the #1 ranking on Netflix in the US (Perfect Match and Love Is Blind).

Coelen's series (Love Is Blind, The Ultimatum and Married at First Sight) spent 145 days combined in Netflix US Top Ten in 2022 - more than the combined output of any other producer, scripted or non-scripted (except for Cocomelon at 147 days).

Coelen's series had over 550 million combined hours of viewing worldwide on Netflix in 2022, more than any producer other than Shonda Rhimes, Ryan Murphy and the teams behind Ozark, Stranger Things and Wednesday.

In the first half of 2023, four separate series from Coelen hit the Netflix US Top Five Ranking (Love Is Blind, Perfect Match, The Ultimatum: Queer Love and Netflix's acquisition of Married at First Sight).

Love Is Blind is the most successful unscripted series in Netflix history, and as of the 18 months leading up to July, 2023, it had spent more days (131) in the Netflix U.S. top 10 than any other original series, scripted or unscripted. Nielsen reported Love Is Blind racked up 13.1 billion minutes viewed in 2022, more than any other unscripted series on any platform — digital or linear. Coelen's The Ultimatum and Perfect Match rank respectively as the second and third most popular unscripted shows in Netflix history.

Perfect Match hit Netflix's number one ranking in 37 territories around the world.

Coelen's Married at First Sight debut original season (Season 20) has racked up over 1.8 billion minutes viewed on Peacock, making it one of the platform's highest-reaching original reality programs, up +153% from Season 19. Prior to airing on Peacock, Married at First Sight ranked as Lifetime's #1 rated program since launch, out-rating all other programming on the network by 80%, and its companion after show Married at First Sight: Afterparty was the network's second highest-rated show.

=== Critical response and industry impact ===
Daniel D'Addario of Variety says that "series from the same creator, Chris Coelen... are the new standard-bearers for romantic reality TV" and that "Love Is Blind and The Ultimatum...feature high-concept premises and an aptitude for casting individuals who exist outside conversations about relatability. Coelen’s shows escalate from relatively simple set-ups to wild heights of human behavior, all because contestants are (or appear to be) left to their own devices." D'Addario states that Coelen's shows "feel fresh" because the shows have "an open relationship with (their) format. Coelen’s series occupy a more unsettled place, one that uses the tools of reality (big organizing ideas, people attuned to the dramatic) to create stagings that look like our world."

Lucas Shaw of Bloomberg Businessweek wrote that Netflix Co-CEO Ted Sarandos has praised the quality of Coelen's shows, saying "The measure of quality is, if you love a dating show, make it as good as The Ultimatum, make it as good as Love is Blind. There's no difference in prestige quality television in each of these genres as long as they're well executed."

Ryan Gajewski of The Hollywood Reporter wrote that with regard to reality TV, Coelen is one of "...the individuals behind some of the genre’s biggest success stories."

Laura Bradley of The Daily Beast wrote, "Executive producer Chris Coelen runs a small empire of high-concept dating programs, both at Netflix (Love Is Blind and The Ultimatum: Marry or Move On) and beyond...Perfect Match might not be his most visionary work (that’s Love Is Blind) or his most diabolical (that’s definitely The Ultimatum), it might be his most pleasantly light-hearted."

Tara Ariano of Vanity Fair wrote that Coelen and Kinetic have created their own "class of romance shows." with Lifetime’s Married At First Sight, Netflix’s Love Is Blind, The Ultimatum: Marry Or Move On and Perfect Match.

Emily Longeretta of Variety wrote that Coelen is a "proven innovator in the reality genre" and that "his passion for storytelling is what has established (Kinetic) as one of the top." Longeretta pointed out that as of 2023, "in the last 12 years, only four global non-scripted format hits have spawned multiple localized international versions in a foreign language, all while hitting the No. 1 ranking for their platform in their most recent season: Married at First Sight, Love Is Blind, The Ultimatum: Marry or Move On and The Masked Singer. As CEO of Kinetic Content, Coelen created and executive produced the first three of those four series."

Natalie Jarvey of Vanity Fair quoted Netflix executive Brandon Riegg saying Coelen's shows are "the biggest dating shows in the US on television" and regarding Love Is Blind that "you can’t overstate the impact that that show’s had…within Netflix and then, I’d say, on TV in general.”

=== Diversity ===
Ryan Gajewski of The Hollywood Reporter quoted Coelen, "For a long time, our shows have been amongst the most diverse on television — across the board, scripted or unscripted — and that’s going back to season one of Married at First Sight. On our various shows, we have showcased tremendous diversity in terms of background, socioeconomic status, sexual identity, ethnicity, geography. Ultimatum: Queer Love is absolutely amazing. I am so proud of what we’re doing in that show. One of the reasons I’m so excited to be doing as many of these types of shows as we do is, there’s so much more that unites us than sets us apart."

Tilly Pearce of Digital Spy wrote about Coelen's Perfect Match, saying it features "perhaps one of the most uniquely important conversations around queer love shown on reality television in recent years...and Perfect Match putting these conversations out into the world is what makes it stand out from rival dating shows....Perfect Match's multiple variations on queer love, bisexuality and the complicated feelings that may/may not come with that part of your identity is a refreshing, surprisingly deep, and much-needed positive take. It also displays positive examples of how to be an ally to loved ones who need that reassurance and support."

Trish Bender of The New York Times said that with The Ultimatum: Queer Love, "Netflix’s latest dating reality show hit broke ground by focusing exclusively on queer and nonbinary couples" and that Coelen hopes it "in both its relatability and specificity, lowers barriers between people in some way.” Bender continued, "overall 'Queer Love' has been well-received and highly memed — praised by writers and viewers for giving queer women and nonbinary people a chance to see their own relationships reflected on an enormous platform like Netflix."

== Accolades ==
In 2020, 2022, 2023, 2024, 2025 and 2026 Coelen was nominated for an Emmy Award as executive producer of Love Is Blind in the category of Outstanding Structured Reality Program.

Coelen has won four Critic's Choice Awards for Best Relationship Show - for Married at First Sight in 2019, and for Love Is Blind in 2020, 2022, and 2023.

Coelen has also been nominated for a Grierson Award for Best Entertaining Documentary for Love Is Blind in 2020, as well as a People's Choice Award for the Bingeworthy Show of 2020 and a MTV Movie & TV Award for Best Dating Show in 2021.

In 2023, the Hollywood Reporter named Coelen its "Unscripted Power Player of the Year."

== Personal life ==
Coelen met his wife on a blind date; they have four children.
