= Love Is Blind season 11 =

Season of American television series (2026)

Love Is Blind
- Season 11
- Presented by: Nick Lachey; Vanessa Lachey

Release
- Original network: Netflix
- Original release: October 14 – November 8, 2026

Season chronology
- ← Previous; Season 10

The eleventh season of Love Is Blind premiered on Netflix on October 14, 2026, and ended on November 8, 2026. This season followed singles from the Boston, Massachusetts metro area.

== Season summary ==
Couples	Married	Still together	Relationship notes
Sarah and John	Yes	No	Married. At the reunion, it was revealed that John texted an escort he met during a night out with friends. Sarah said that the two had communication issues and that her seeing those texts was the final thing that made her decide to leave.
Aneha and Cam	No	No	Leading up to the wedding, Aneha's parents are uninterested in participating and her sister has doubt in Cam's love, telling Aneha that she should say no. At the wedding, Cam says yes while Aneha says that she can't marry him at the moment. In a private conversation later, she still refers to Cam as her fiancé, but he is unsure of if they can continue together. At the reunion, it's revealed that Cam decided that they should end their relationship there.
Wilnie and Wilson	No	No	Following coming back from the pods, Wilnie and Wilson clash several times over Wilson being unsure of how things would go if he went with his other connection, leaving Wilnie feeling bad but deciding to put it behind them because of it being part of the experiment. The two also clash several time over how to split household duties, with Wilnie feeling like Wilson expects her to be more traditional and act like his mom. With the two not being able to align on several topics, they decide to part ways.
Erika and Blake	No	No	As the weddings approach and the two are starting to go back into their regular lives, they have a conversation about their schedules. The conversation causes Erika to feel overwhelmed, particularly due to Blake's job causing them to not see each other for significant periods of time. The two feel like they need to spend time together in order for their relationship to work, leaving them to decide to call off the show's wedding. In a post-show interview, Erika also revealed that the two couldn't seem to align on other future plans like children and finances. At the reunion, it was revealed that they did not continue their relationship.
Michaella and Rob	No	No	While the two are hanging out at a bar with Rob's friends, the bar cuts off drinks for one of the friends and Rob gets annoyed. Rob gets more annoyed when Michaella is talking to his friends about the pods and he brings up an incident where she insinuated he was aggressive. During a meetup with many of the participants, Rob has another outburst and talks about how none of them knew each other prior to a few weeks ago. Despite viewing their relationship as real, Michaella feels insulted by his words and decides to end their relationship after these outbursts.
Jax and Stew	No	No	After getting engaged, Jax decided to leave and not go on the honeymoon trip with Stew. During private talks with production, Jax mentioned that the meeting did not feel romantic for her and that she can't be with him. The two met up back in Boston, but their conversation did not make much progress and they went separate ways. In post-show interviews, Jax explained that she felt Stew was very different during their meeting from the way he was acting in their pod conversations.

== Participants ==
All participants lived in the Boston metro area at the time of filming.

Name	Age	Occupation	Relationship status
Sarah Williams	34	Healthcare Program Manager	Married; Currently divorced
John Shannon	33	Account Executive	Married; Currently divorced
Aneha Singh	28	Principal Engineer	Split at the wedding
Cam Halloran	29	HR Generalist	Split at the wedding
Wilnie Louis	33	Mental Health Counselor	Split before the wedding
Wilson Monteiro	35	Senior Compliance Manager	Split before the wedding
Erika Ellis	37	Marketing Director	Split before the wedding
Blake Carver	38	Yacht Captain	Split before the wedding
Michaella Giorgio	35	Retail Consultant	Split before the wedding
Rob Feeley	40	AI Infrastructure Sales	Split before the wedding
Jacqueline "Jax" Guelli	31	Entrepreneur	Split before the wedding
Scott "Stew" Stewart	34	Director of Engineering	Split before the wedding
Brittany Bianco	34	Attorney	Split before the wedding (Note: This relationship and engagement was not aired in the final cut, but it was confirmed during the airing of the season)
Scott Shuman	38	Retired Pro Baseball Player	Split before the wedding
Amenawon "Iman" Johnson	34	Software Engineer	Not engaged
Jonathon "Jay" Robinson	36	Director of Sales	Not engaged
Mark Colantonio	37	Wine Sales Consultant	Not engaged
Matt Waldrip	37	Beekeeper	Not engaged
Michael Arisco	35	Account Executive	Not engaged
Morrey Eglin	32	Entrepreneur	Not engaged
Tucker Myhre	35	Senior Solutions Consultant	Not engaged
Benita Paloja	31	Insurance Agent	Not engaged
Diana Perrone	29	Nanny	Not engaged
Jenn Mouser	39	Master Hairstylist	Not engaged
Kara Grumoli	32	Strategic Account Manager	Not engaged
Kerry Cashman	37	Athletic Director	Not engaged
Liz Rounds	34	NICU Nurse	Not engaged
Malaine Thorpe	33	Senior Portfolio Analyst	Not engaged
Rachel Aukema	32	Academic Advisor	Not engaged
Sahar Mostafavi	34	Orthodontist	Not engaged

== Episodes ==
"Love Is Blind" season 11 Episodes
No. overall	No. in season	Title	Original release date
Week 1
137	1	"Enchanted To Meet You"	October 14, 2026
138	2	"What a Woman!"	October 14, 2026
139	3	"Together at Last"	October 14, 2026
140	4	"Sink Or Swim"	October 14, 2026
141	5	"Here Comes the Dud"	October 14, 2026
Week 2
142	6	"When You Know You Know"	October 21, 2026
143	7	"Happy Wife, Happy Life"	October 21, 2026
144	8	"Under Pressure"	October 21, 2026
Week 3
145	9	"Buzz Kill"	October 28, 2026
146	10	"Where There's a Will, There's a Way"	October 28, 2026
147	11	"If Not Now, When?"	October 28, 2026
Week 4
148	12	"Everything Is Better with You"	November 4, 2026
Special
149	13	"The Reunion"	November 8, 2026

== Unaired engagement ==
In addition to the six couples followed throughout the season, at least one other couple got engaged in the pods. Brittany Bianco and Scott Shuman got engaged in the pods. The engagement was revealed following the first drop of episodes, with it later being shared that the two are no longer together.
