= Love Is Blind season 9 =

Season of American television series (2025)

Love Is Blind
- Season 9
- Presented by: Nick Lachey; Vanessa Lachey
- No. of episodes: 13

Release
- Original network: Netflix
- Original release: October 1 – October 29, 2025

Season chronology
- ← Previous; Season 8 Next → Season 10

The ninth season of Love Is Blind premiered on Netflix on October 1, 2025 and concluded on October 29, 2025. This season followed singles from the Denver, Colorado metro area.

== Season summary ==
This is the first (and to date, only) season in which no couple got married. Two contestants (Anna Yuan and Blake Anderson) left the pods early.

Couples	Married	Still together	Relationship notes
Kalybriah and Edmond	No	No	At the altar, Kalybriah said no to Edmond. She said that Edmond deserves someone who is 100% ready and that, at the moment, that is not her. At the reunion in October 2025, both said they were single.
Ali and Anton	No	No	At the altar, Ali said no to Anton. She believed that the person Anton had been outside of the pods was not the same person she caught feelings for. Specifically, she pointed out being surprised about his level of drinking, partying, being active, and his healthy eating. At the reunion, Ali declined to reveal her relationship status while Anton said he had been in a relationship for about a year.
Megan W. and Jordan	No	No	Megan broke up with Jordan before their wedding. Megan believed their lifestyles were too different and she would not feel right marrying him. After Jordan left, Megan said she was initially into the idea of him already having a child, but did not think she realized how much of a commitment or how challenging it would be to become a stepmother. At the reunion, Megan revealed that she is in a relationship and is now a mother, and Jordan said he is single.
Madison and Joe	No	No	Joe broke up with Madison shortly after the tuxedo fittings. While not giving a specific reason, Joe did not feel the relationship was working and told her that he would say no if they went to the altar. At the reunion, Madison said she is single and Joe said he is in a relationship.
Annie and Nick	No	No	Nick broke up with Annie due to being unhappy in their relationship. The night before dress and tuxedo fittings, the two had an argument that Nick saw as a breaking point for him. Given their frequent conflicts, Nick said that he did not feel like he could continue their relationship. At the reunion, both said they are single.
Kacie and Patrick	No	No	After becoming engaged, Kacie second guessed her decision and returned to Denver before the honeymoon. In private talks with production, Kacie mentioned that she was not attracted to Patrick and did not believe that she could "get there" with him. Patrick suggested rekindling their relationship in Denver, but post-show interviews indicated this never happened. The interviews also indicated that Kacie realized she was uncomfortable going through a relationship on camera. At the reunion, both said that they are single.

== Participants ==
All participants lived in the Denver, Colorado metro area at the time of filming.

Name	Age	Occupation	Relationship Status
Kalybriah Haskin	29	Social Worker	Split at the wedding
Edmond Harvey	29	Realtor	Split at the wedding
Aline "Ali" Lima	29	Nurse	Split at the wedding
Anton Yarosh	29	Transportation/Logistics	Split at the wedding
Megan Walerius	35	Entrepreneur	Split before the wedding
Jordan Keltner	30	Service Manager	Split before the wedding
Madison Maidenberg	28	UX/UI Designer	Split before the wedding
Joe Ferrucci	29	Sales	Split before the wedding
Annie Lancaster	31	Hair Salon Owner	Split before the wedding
Nick Amato	28	Luxury Watch Dealer	Split before the wedding
Kacie McIntosh	34	Hair and Makeup Artist	Split before the wedding
Patrick Suzuki	31	Construction Manager	Split before the wedding
Blake Anderson	34	Accountant	Not engaged
Brenden Guthrie	32	Finance Manager	Not engaged
Chase Navarro	29	Water Treatment Consultant	Not engaged
Dayo Ogunjimi	30	IT Advisor	Not engaged
Dylan Mustoe	32	Financial Analyst	Not engaged
Jensen Butler	29	Data Analyst	Not engaged
Logan Krantz	35	Account Executive	Not engaged
Michael Neal	41	Medical Sales	Not engaged
Mike Brockway	38	Real Estate Investor	Not engaged
Rohan Patel	27	Private Equity	Not engaged
Anastasia Lubline	29	Nurse	Not engaged
Anna Yuan	28	Hairstylist	Not engaged
Ashley Usery	35	Director of Compliance	Not engaged
Aza Weyer	32	Events Manager	Not engaged
Chyna Craig	39	Marketing Manager	Not engaged
Hilary Seale	39	Medical Device Sales	Not engaged
Kait Nemunaitis	33	Registered Dietitian	Not engaged
Kaylen Johnson	29	Account Executive	Not engaged
Megan Hutton	36	Property Manager	Not engaged
Shelby Crisman	35	Realtor	Not engaged

== Episodes ==
"Love Is Blind" season 8 Episodes
No. overall	No. in season	Title	Original release date
Week 1
111	1	"A Love that Sparkles"	October 1, 2025
112	2	"Love Me When I'm Blind?"	October 1, 2025
113	3	"Ghost Town"	October 1, 2025
114	4	"The Dangerous Games We Play"	October 1, 2025
115	5	"I Want You To Want Me"	October 1, 2025
116	6	"Coming In Hot"	October 1, 2025
Week 2
117	7	"Unknown Factors"	October 8, 2025
118	8	"Stripping the Veil"	October 8, 2025
119	9	"Ghosts of Pods Past"	October 8, 2025
Week 3
120	10	"Runaway Groom"	October 15, 2025
121	11	"Don't Go Breaking My Heart"	October 15, 2025
Week 4
122	12	"Vow or Never"	October 22, 2025
Special
123	13	"The Reunion"	October 29, 2025
