= Love Is Blind season 1 =

Love Is Blind
- Season 1
- Presented by: Nick Lachey; Vanessa Lachey
- No. of episodes: 14

Release
- Original network: Netflix
- Original release: February 13, 2020 – July 28, 2021

Season chronology
- Next → Season 2

The first season of Love Is Blind premiered on Netflix on February 13, 2020, and concluded on February 27, 2020. A reunion episode was released on March 5, 2020, and a three-part companion piece entitled After the Altar was released on July 28, 2021. The season followed singles from Atlanta, Georgia.

== Season summary ==
Couples	Married	Still together	Relationship notes
Lauren and Cameron	Yes	Yes	Married in November 2018. In October 2025, the couple announced the birth of their son.
Amber and Matthew	Yes	Yes	Married in November 2018. In April 2025, the couple announced the birth of their daughter.
Giannina and Damian	No	No	Split on their wedding day after Damian said no (Giannina said yes). During the reunion special, it was revealed that they had gotten back together. After the airing of After the Altar, Giannina revealed the couple had broken up again in early 2021. Giannina is now married to Blake Horstmann, runner up on season 14 of The Bachelorette, as of June 20, 2026. Their first child was born March 29, 2024.
Jessica and Mark	No	No	Jessica left Mark at the altar on their wedding day. Mark did not attend filming for After the Altar but was mentioned to be dating Aubrey Rainey. Mark and Aubrey married in September 2022 and have two sons together. Mark announced their breakup in March 2025. Jessica married podiatrist Ben McGrath in August 2022. Their first child was born in June 2023.
Kelly and Kenny	No	No	Split on their wedding day after Kelly said no. During the reunion special, it was revealed that Kenny was in a relationship. Kenny married his partner, Alexandra Garrison, in the spring of 2022 and as of February 2025, are expecting a baby. As of May 2025 Kelly is single.
Diamond and Carlton	No	No	The relationship imploded after a dramatic fight during the couple's trip to Playa del Carmen, Mexico, during which they fought about Carlton's recently disclosed bisexuality, his lack of communication, and Carlton's derogatory comments about Diamond. As of May 2025, both were single.

== Participants ==
All the participants lived in Atlanta at the time of filming.

Name	Age	Occupation	Relationship Status
Lauren Speed	32	Content Creator	Married November 2018
Cameron Hamilton	28	Data Scientist	Married November 2018
Amber Pike	27	Ex-Tank Mechanic	Married November 2018
Matthew Barnett	27	Engineer	Married November 2018
Giannina Gibelli	25	Business Owner	Split at the wedding; broke up again at the beginning of 2021
Damian Powers	27	Ex-General Manager	Split at the wedding; broke up again at the beginning of 2021
Jessica Batten	34	Regional Manager	Split at the wedding
Mark Cuevas	24	Fitness Trainer	Split at the wedding
Kelly Chase	33	Holistic Health and Empowerment Coach	Split at the wedding
Kenny Barnes	27	Sales	Split at the wedding
Diamond Jack	28	Former NBA Dancer	Split before the wedding
Carlton Morton	34	Social Media Marketer	Split before the wedding
Danielle Drouin	27	Yoga Instructor	Split before the wedding (Note: This relationship and engagement was not aired in the final cut but was confirmed by the series creator, Chris Coelen.)
Rory Newbrough	28	Senior Consultant and Content Creator	Split before the wedding
Lexie Skipper	26	Sales Manager	Split before the wedding
Westley Baer	27	Sales Manager and Life Coach	Split before the wedding
Lauren "LC" Chamblin	26	Recruiter and Account Executive	Not engaged
Alyson Costa	36	Pediatric Nurse Client Relations Director	Not engaged
Andy Rickert	30	Welder	Not engaged
Briana Holmes	24	CEO	Not engaged
Ebony Alexis	30	Journalist	Not engaged
India Bridgeforth	29	Project Manager	Not engaged
Jon Smith	38	CEO	Not engaged
Kay Mitchell	30	Administrative Director	Not engaged
Kenneth Smith	36	Master Barber and Shop Owner	Not engaged
Lillie Williams	36	CEO	Not engaged
Matt Thomas	28	Director	Not engaged
Mikey Cobb	31	Business Analyst	Not engaged
Ryan Martin	29	Automotive Sales	Not engaged
Taylor Lupton	31	Creative Director	Not engaged

=== Future appearances ===
In 2023, Lauren "LC" Chamblin, Diamond Jack and Damian Powers appeared on the first season of Perfect Match. Jack was eliminated in Episode 9. Powers split from Francesca Farago in Episode 11. Chamblin finished as a finalist in a couple with Nick Uhlenhuth.

== Episodes ==
Love Is Blind season 1 episodes
No. overall	No. in season	Title	Original release date
Week 1
1	1	"Is Love Blind?"	February 13, 2020
2	2	"Will You Marry Me?"	February 13, 2020
3	3	"First Night Together"	February 13, 2020
4	4	"Couples Retreat"	February 13, 2020
5	5	"Last Night in Paradise"	February 13, 2020
Week 2
6	6	"Moving in Together"	February 20, 2020
7	7	"Meet the Parents"	February 20, 2020
8	8	"Countdown to I Do's"	February 20, 2020
9	9	"Bachelor & Bachelorette Parties"	February 20, 2020
Week 3
10	10	"The Weddings"	February 27, 2020
Special
11	11	"The Reunion"	March 5, 2020
After the Altar
12	12	"Two Years Later"	July 28, 2021
13	13	"Married, Single, and It's Complicated"	July 28, 2021
14	14	"Celebrations and Confrontations"	July 28, 2021

== Unaired engagements ==
During season 1, a total of eight couples got engaged among the participants.

In addition to the six couples shown on the series, couples Westley Baer and Lexie Skipper and Rory Newbrough and Danielle Drouin also got engaged in the show. Newbrough told People, "As we were preparing to go to the Mexico trip, the leads of the show came in and said, 'Hey, we were expecting maybe one or two [engagements]. The shows we've done before, we've never had this much success. We prepared for five. Then we got eight engagements, so we had to pick who we were going to follow.' We got our phones back. They thanked us graciously and said, 'Sorry, we just don’t have enough to cover everybody.'"

After getting engaged in the pods, Baer and Skipper continued to date for three months before breaking up. Newbrough and Drouin took a week-long trip to Miami together after getting engaged. They broke up after returning from the trip and Drouin decided to pursue a relationship with another participant on the show, Matt Thomas. Thomas and Drouin later split as well.
