= Love Is Blind season 6 =

Love Is Blind
- Season 6
- Presented by: Nick Lachey; Vanessa Lachey
- No. of episodes: 13

Release
- Original network: Netflix
- Original release: February 14 – March 13, 2024

Season chronology
- ← Previous; Season 5 Next → Season 7

The sixth season of Love Is Blind premiered on Netflix on February 14, 2024, and concluded on March 6, 2024, with a reunion episode released on March 13, 2024. The season followed singles from Charlotte, North Carolina.

== Season summary ==
Couples	Married	Still together	Relationship notes
Amy and Johnny	Yes	Yes	Married on May 10, 2023 and still together as of October 2025.
AD and Clay	No	No	The couple arrived at the altar, only for Amber to say "I do" and for Clay to say no. Clay said he is not ready for marriage and vowed to seek therapy on the matter. AD got engaged in March 2025 and is expecting a child with Love is Blind: UK contestant Ollie Sutherland. They married in October 2025.
Chelsea and Jimmy	No	No	The couple ended their engagement after Jimmy confessed that Chelsea betrayed his trust by exposing his past sexual relationship with one of his friends on television. They were both in relationships but are now single as of October 2025.
Laura and Jeramey	No	No	The couple ended their engagement after Jeramey met in secret with fellow castmate Sarah Ann. Jeramey and Sarah Ann continued to date for several months. Sarah Ann confirmed their split in September 2024. Laura is now in a relationship and Jeramey is single as of October 2025.
Brittany and Kenneth	No	No	Kenneth ended their engagement after Brittany said she felt a lack of passion in the relationship outside of the pods. During the reunion, it was revealed that Brittany and Kenneth are now just friends. They are both single as of October 2025.

== Participants ==
All the participants lived in Charlotte at the time of filming.

Name	Age	Occupation	Relationship Status
Amy Cortés	28	E-Commerce Specialist	Married May 2023
Johnny McIntyre	28	Account Executive	Married May 2023
Amber Desiree "AD" Smith	33	Real Estate Broker	Split at the wedding
Clay Gravesande	31	Enterprise Sales and Entrepreneur	Split at the wedding
Chelsea Blackwell	31	Flight Attendant and Event Planner	Split before the wedding
Jimmy Presnell	28	Software Sales	Split before the wedding
Laura Dadisman	34	Account Director	Split before the wedding
Jeramey Lutinski	32	Intralogistics	Split before the wedding
Brittany Mills	25	Senior Client Partner	Split before the wedding
Kenneth Gorham	26	Middle School Principal	Split before the wedding
Alejandra Toro	28	Financial Consultant	Not engaged
Amber Grant	31	Medical Device Sales	Not engaged
Amy Cai	34	Public Relations Director	Not engaged
Ariel Gomerez	32	Mortgage Broker	Not engaged
Ashley Wala	32	Nurse Practitioner	Not engaged
Austin Borders	27	Software Sales	Not engaged
Danette Coombs	33	Flight Attendant	Not engaged
Danielle Washington	30	Corporate Communications	Not engaged
Deion Perry	27	Software Sales	Not engaged
Drake Carmody	32	Video Producer	Not engaged
Jamal Stewart	32	Store Director	Not engaged
Jessica Vestal	29	Executive Assistant	Not engaged
Mackenzie Tenold	25	Makeup Artist	Not engaged
Matthew Duliba	37	Senior Financial Advisor	Not engaged
Nolan McNulty	31	Management Consultant	Not engaged
Sarah Bick	30	Customer Support Manager	Not engaged
Sunni Haralalka	34	Business Analyst	Not engaged
Trevor Sova	31	Project Manager	Not engaged
Vince Doa	35	Lawyer	Not engaged

=== Future appearances ===
In 2024, Trevor Sova and Jessica Vestal appeared on the second season of Perfect Match.

In 2026, Jimmy Presnell appeared on season four of Perfect Match.

== Episodes ==
Love Is Blind season 6 episodes
No. overall	No. in season	Title	Original release date
Week 1
71	1	"Higher Love"	February 14, 2024
72	2	"The Hunger Games of Love"	February 14, 2024
73	3	"Operation Get My Girl Back"	February 14, 2024
74	4	"The Hardest Decision of My Life"	February 14, 2024
75	5	"She Lied to Me"	February 14, 2024
76	6	"Feeling Uncomfy"	February 14, 2024
Week 2
77	7	"Silence Speaks Volumes"	February 21, 2024
78	8	"Clinging to Love"	February 21, 2024
79	9	"Secret Rendezvous"	February 21, 2024
Week 3
80	10	"What Could Have Been"	February 28, 2024
81	11	"Roller Coaster of Love"	February 28, 2024
Week 4
82	12	"Meet Me at the Altar"	March 6, 2024
Special
83	13	"The Reunion"	March 13, 2024
