= Love Is Blind season 8 =

Season of American television series (2025)

Love Is Blind
- Season 8
- Presented by: Nick Lachey; Vanessa Lachey
- No. of episodes: 14

Release
- Original network: Netflix
- Original release: February 14 – March 9, 2025

Season chronology
- ← Previous; Season 7 Next → Season 9

The eighth season of Love Is Blind premiered on Netflix on February 14, 2025 and concluded on March 9, 2025. This season followed singles from the Minneapolis-St. Paul, Minnesota metro area.

== Season summary ==
Couples	Married	Still together	Relationship notes
Taylor and Daniel	Yes	Yes	Married in March 2024, and still together as of April 2026.
Virginia and Devin	No	No	At the altar, Virginia said no after Devin said yes. Virginia did not feel like their relationship was at the level required for marriage, specifically pointing out their communication issues, politics, and sex as reasons their relationship wasn't deep enough for her to say yes.
Monica and Joey	No	No	At the altar, Monica said no after feeling that they weren't fully ready to get married despite their love for each other, and Joey agreed with her. Monica later said she didn't feel reassured enough in their relationship to say yes. Joey is currently in a relationship with fellow participant Sara as of October 2025.
Sara and Ben	No	No	At the altar, Sara said no and elaborated that she didn't think the two of them were on the same wavelength. After getting into a car with her mom and sister, Sara told them that the two weren't similar enough in values that were important to her, pointing out Ben's lack of interest and opinions on things like social issues. Sara is currently in a relationship with fellow participant Joey.
Lauren and David	No	No	After returning from their honeymoon, David found out Lauren was casually hooking up with a different guy shortly before filming. With the information reaching his family and friends, David decided he couldn't get over it and broke up with Lauren. David apologized to her shortly after the breakup; however, Lauren did not want to reconcile their relationship.

== Participants ==
All participants lived in Minneapolis-St. Paul at the time of filming.

Name	Age	Occupation	Relationship Status
Taylor Haag	32	Colonoscopy Nurse	Married March 2024
Daniel Hastings	30	Sales Account Executive	Married March 2024
Kylie Schuelke	28	Medical Student	Engaged (Note: This relationship and engagement was not aired in the final cut, but it was confirmed during the airing of the season.)
Brian Sumption	30	Wine Bar Owner	Engaged
Virginia Miller	34	Healthcare Recruiter	Split at the wedding
Devin Buckley	29	Youth Director/Coach	Split at the wedding
Monica Danús	28	Digital Marketing	Split at the wedding
Joey Leveille	35	Physician Associate	Split at the wedding
Sara Carton	29	Oncology Nurse	Split at the wedding
Ben Mezzenga	28	Developer	Split at the wedding
Lauren O'Brien	31	Educational Sales	Split before the wedding
David Bettenburg	33	Medical Device Sales	Split before the wedding
Brittany Dodson	35	Partnership Executive	Split before the wedding (Note: This relationship and engagement was not aired in the final cut, but it was confirmed following the airing of the season)
Mo Ndiaye	35	Property Manager	Split before the wedding
Adam Bevis	33	Fashion Director/Co-Owner	Not engaged
Alex Brown	29	Commercial Real Estate Broker	Not engaged
Andrew Cole	27	Realtor	Not engaged
Benji Smith	26	Entrepreneur/Realtor	Not engaged
Brad Morgan	35	Dentist	Not engaged
Hugo Orieny	30	Marketing	Not engaged
Mason Horacek	33	Cinematographer	Not engaged
Scott Sanderson	34	Project Manager	Not engaged
Tom Dann	38	Management Consultant	Not engaged
Amanda Burke	43	District Retail Manager	Not engaged
Ashley Suter	28	Client Success Manager	Not engaged
Casandra Barron	30	Hairstylist	Not engaged
Madison Errichiello	28	Artist	Not engaged
Meg Fink	31	Oncology Nurse	Not engaged
Molly Mullaney	30	Executive Assistant	Not engaged
Tiera Shavone	34	Marketing Strategist	Not engaged
Vanessa Boreland	31	Media Planner	Not engaged
Yemi Ajagbe	30	Product Sales Manager	Not engaged

== Episodes ==
"Love Is Blind" season 8 Episodes
No. overall	No. in season	Title	Original release date
Week 1
97	1	"I Have A Husband"	February 14, 2025
98	2	"Open Hearts, Open Minds, Can't Lose"	February 14, 2025
99	3	"Hunger Games of Love"	February 14, 2025
100	4	"So Your Girlfriend Has a Boyfriend"	February 14, 2025
101	5	"Breaking Up Is Hard To Do"	February 14, 2025
102	6	"Do I Know You?"	February 14, 2025
Week 2
103	7	"Bueller?"	February 21, 2025
104	8	"A Family Affair"	February 21, 2025
105	9	"The EX-Files"	February 21, 2025
Week 3
106	10	"Oh Spare Me"	February 28, 2025
107	11	"Sliding Down Slopes and Into DMs"	February 28, 2025
108	12	"Brides' Last Ride"	February 28, 2025
Week 4
109	13	"The Weddings"	March 7, 2025
Special
110	14	"The Reunion"	March 9, 2025

== Unaired engagements and other relationships ==
In addition to the five couples followed throughout the season, at least two other couples got engaged in the pods:

- Kylie Schuelke and Brian Sumption got engaged in the pods and are currently still together, just not married. After not being selected to go on the honeymoon trip with the other couples, they decided to move at their own pace and not feel the pressure to officially get married yet.
- Brittany Dodson and Mo Ndiaye got engaged in the pods but are no longer together. After volunteering to not go on the honeymoon trip, Brittany and Mo decided to get to know each other on their own terms. Shortly after returning from the pods, Mo told Brittany that he was hesitant about continuing because he had never dated a black woman before, and eventually the two of them went their separate ways.

While they did not get engaged in the pods, Meg Fink and Mason Horacek have also gotten into a relationship together.

== Reception ==
In the season finale, Sara Carton and Virginia Miller rejected their fiancé partners at the altar, citing misalignment on political and social values as the decisive factors. Carton ended her engagement with Ben Mezzenga after realizing he lacked curiosity about issues like Black Lives Matter, LGBTQ+ rights, and vaccines, saying she wanted a partner who shared her values. Meanwhile, Miller broke off her engagement with Devin Buckley due to his conservative views and unwillingness to discuss political issues.

These high-profile splits generated extensive media discussion—some viewers praised the emphasis on ideological alignment as critical to relationship longevity, while others criticized the public and dramatic context of the rejections. Analysts note that Season 8 reflects a broader trend in modern dating, where shared political values are increasingly seen not just as preferences but as foundational to personal identity and long-term compatibility.

Following the season’s release, online discussion extended beyond the cast to include Daniel Nides, a non-cast individual referenced in the Lauren O’Brien and Dave Bettenburg storyline. Viewers circulated screenshots and social media posts attempting to identify him, prompting several entertainment outlets to publish explainers about his identity and background.

Coverage in publications including Business Insider, People, Today, Cosmopolitan, Elite Daily, Yahoo Entertainment, and Vulture summarized the speculation and public responses. Several outlets noted the scale of cross-platform discussion, including podcast commentary and social media amplification, as an example of how reality television narratives can extend beyond on-screen participants.

In an interview with Playgirl, Nides addressed the controversy and stated that he had explored potential legal action related to reputational harm and privacy concerns stemming from the storyline and subsequent online attention. The article described the episode as an example of how off-screen individuals can experience significant public exposure as a result of reality television narratives. It also noted that the heightened visibility led to additional media appearances and professional opportunities.
