= Love Is Blind season 4 =

Love Is Blind
- Season 4
- Presented by: Nick Lachey; Vanessa Lachey
- No. of episodes: 16

Release
- Original network: Netflix
- Original release: March 24 – September 1, 2023

Season chronology
- ← Previous; Season 3 Next → Season 5

The fourth season of Love Is Blind premiered on Netflix on March 24, 2023, and concluded on April 14, 2023, with a reunion episode released on April 16, 2023. A three-part companion piece entitled After the Altar was released on September 1, 2023. The season followed singles from Seattle, Washington.

== Season summary ==
Couples	Married	Still together	Relationship notes
Tiffany and Brett	Yes	Yes	Married in May 2022 and still together as of October 2025.
Zack and Bliss	Yes	Yes	Did not initially get engaged in the pods but later reconnected after Zack and Irina's engagement ended. Got engaged on a boat date in Seattle. Married in May 2022. They announced Bliss was pregnant on November 21, 2023. Their daughter was born on April 26, 2024, they are still together as of October 2025 .
Chelsea and Kwame	Yes	No	Married in May 2022. The two announced in May 2026 that they are ending their relationship.
Micah and Paul	No	No	Split on their wedding day after Paul said no. They tried dating briefly after the wedding but split permanently shortly after. Paul entered a new relationship in May 2023 but they broke up sometime in 2024. Micah entered a relationship in July 2025.
Jackelina and Marshall	No	No	Jackie broke up with Marshall and went on to have a relationship with Josh Demas from the show; they are no longer together and are both single as of February 2025.
Zack and Irina	No	No	Got engaged in the pods but broke off the engagement in Mexico after Irina said Zack gave her "the ick" and that she still had feelings for Paul; meanwhile, Zack expressed feelings for Bliss. Irina is still single as of February 2025.
Josh and Monica	No	No	Got engaged in the pods but broke off the engagement soon after. Their relationship was not telecast. Josh is single and Monica is in a relationship as of February 2025.

== Participants ==
Most participants lived in Seattle at the time of filming.

Name	Age	Occupation	Relationship Status
Tiffany Pennywell	37	Client Lead Recruiter	Married May 2022
Brett Brown	36	Design Director for Nike	Married May 2022
Bliss Poureetezadi	33	Senior Program Manager	Married May 2022
Zack Goytowski	31	Criminal Defense Attorney	Married May 2022
Chelsea Griffin	31	Pediatric Speech–Language Pathologist	Married May 2022; Announced breakup May 2026
Kwame Appiah	33	Sales Development Manager	Married May 2022; Announced breakup May 2026
Micah Lussier	26	Marketing Manager	Split at the wedding
Paul Peden	29	Environmental Scientist	Split at the wedding
Jackelina Bonds	27	Certified Dental Assistant	Split before the wedding
Marshall Glaze	27	Marketing Manager	Split before the wedding
Irina Solomonova	26	Business Owner	Briefly engaged to Zack; split before the wedding
Wendi Kong	28	Aerospace Engineer	Split before the wedding (Note: This relationship and engagement was not aired in the final cut, but was confirmed by the series creator, Chris Coelen.)
Jimmy Forde	29	Technical Product Manager	Split before the wedding
Ava Van Jenson	32	Communications Specialist	Split before the wedding
Joshua “JP” Schultz	30	Plant Operations Director	Split before the wedding
Monica Rodriguez	31	Elementary School Teacher	Split before the wedding
Josh Demas	31	Project Engineer	Split before the wedding
Amber Wilder	34	Flight Attendant	Not engaged
April King	29	Sales and Marketing Coordinator	Not engaged
Bill Alamshahi	33	Real Estate Investor	Not engaged
Brandie Bowman	39	Real Estate Broker	Not engaged
Chris Clemens	32	Technical Recruiter	Not engaged
J. Conner Fremmerlid	28	Operations Manager	Not engaged
Jack Bonner	30	Software Sales	Not engaged
Juan Johnson	30	Mortgage Loan Officer	Not engaged
Kacia Clark	31	Family Support Specialist	Not engaged
Kendra Patrick	33	Social Worker	Not engaged
Molly McGrew	32	Marriage and Family Therapist	Not engaged
Quincy Sutton	36	Gym Owner and Fitness Coach	Not engaged
Ryland Longoni	29	Commercial Insurance and Real Estate	Not engaged

=== Future appearances ===
In 2024, Micah Lussier appeared on the second season of Perfect Match.

In 2025, Irina Solomonova appeared on the first season of Battle Camp.

== Episodes ==
Love Is Blind season 4 episodes
No. overall	No. in season	Title	Original release date
Week 1
44	1	"Welcome to the Pods!"	March 24, 2023
45	2	"Birthday Wishes"	March 24, 2023
46	3	"Is Love Really Blind?"	March 24, 2023
47	4	"Playing with Fire"	March 24, 2023
48	5	"Paradise Lost"	March 24, 2023
Week 2
49	6	"I Made a Mistake"	March 31, 2023
50	7	"Second Time's the Charm?"	March 31, 2023
51	8	"Pick Me"	March 31, 2023
Week 3
52	9	"Romeo and Juliet Didn't Work Out"	April 7, 2023
53	10	"Thank You, Next"	April 7, 2023
54	11	"You Are Overpriced"	April 7, 2023
Week 4
55	12	"Eternal Bliss?"	April 14, 2023
Special
56	13	"The "Live" Reunion"	April 16, 2023
After the Altar
57	14	"The One Year Anniversary"	September 1, 2023
58	15	"Moving On and Moving In"	September 1, 2023
59	16	"Settling Scores"	September 1, 2023

== Unaired engagements ==
In addition to the couples followed in season 4, three additional couples got engaged in the pods but were not included in the couple's trip after the engagements:

- Jimmy Forde and Wendi Kong got engaged in the pods and continued dating for three months after filming. They ended their romantic relationship but remained on good terms.
- Josh "JP" Schultz and Ava Van Jenson ended their relationship at the airport after their filming ended and did not pursue a relationship when they returned home to Seattle.
- Josh Demas and Monica Rodriguez ended their relationship after briefly dating upon return to Seattle. Their relationship and engagement were mentioned in the After the Altar episodes.

== Audience Viewership ==
Media Play News, citing U.S. streaming data from PlumResearch, reported that Love Is Blind drew 6.9 million unique viewers on Netflix during the week ending April 2, 2023, with an average time spent of 201 minutes.
