= Love Is Blind season 2 =

Love Is Blind
- Season 2
- Presented by: Nick Lachey; Vanessa Lachey
- No. of episodes: 14

Release
- Original network: Netflix
- Original release: February 11 – September 16, 2022

Season chronology
- ← Previous; Season 1 Next → Season 3

The second season of Love Is Blind premiered on Netflix on February 11, 2022, and concluded on February 25, 2022. A reunion episode was released on March 4, 2022, and a three-part companion piece entitled After the Altar was released on September 16, 2022. The season followed singles from Chicago, Illinois.

== Season summary ==
Couples	Married	Still together	Relationship notes
Iyanna and Jarrette	Yes	No	Married in June 2021; the couple announced their separation on August 17, 2022 and officially divorced in November 2022. Iyanna was later engaged in 2024 to Alexander Lewis with a wedding planned in January 2026
Danielle and Nick	Yes	No	Married in June 2021; Danielle filed for divorce from Nick on August 21, 2022. As of February 2025 both are single.
Natalie and Shayne	No	No	Split on their wedding day after Natalie said no (Shayne said yes). As of February 2025 both are still single.
Deepti and Shake	No	No	Split on their wedding day after Deepti said no. It was revealed during After the Altar that she and castmate Kyle Abrams had begun dating but ultimately split in the summer of 2022. As of February 2025 both are single.
Mallory and Salvador	No	No	Split on their wedding day after Sal said no. During the reunion special, it was revealed they went on a date after filming, but that Sal is now dating someone else as of 2025 and as of March 2025 Mallory is engaged.
Shaina and Kyle	No	No	Shaina left during the couple's trip to Cancún, Mexico, and officially ended the relationship after Kyle met her family. During the reunion special, Shaina revealed she is in a relationship. As of February 2025 Kyle is single and Shaina got married in July 2022 and has a child born in 2024, and they are still married .

== Participants ==
All the participants lived in Chicago at the time of filming.

Name	Age	Occupation	Relationship Status
Iyanna McNeely	27	Program Coordinator	Married, June 2021; Divorced November 2022
Jarrette Jones	32	Project Manager	Married, June 2021; Divorced November 2022
Danielle Ruhl	29	Associate Director of Marketing	Married June 2021; Divorced afterwards
Nick Thompson	36	VP of Product Marketing	Married June 2021; Divorced afterwards
Natalie Lee	29	Consulting Manager	Split at the wedding
Shayne Jansen	32	Realtor	Split at the wedding
Deepti Vempati	31	Information Data Analyst	Split at the wedding
Abhishek "Shake" Chatterjee	33	Veterinarian and House DJ	Split at the wedding
Mallory Zapata	32	Communications Manager	Split at the wedding
Salvador Perez	31	Executive Assistant	Split at the wedding
Shaina Hurley	32	Freelance Hairstylist	Split before the wedding
Kyle Abrams	29	Glazier	Split before the wedding
Caitlin McKee	31	Medical Sales Professional	Split before the wedding (Note: This relationship and engagement was not aired in the final cut but was confirmed by the series creator, Chris Coelen.)
James "Joey" Miller	30	Business Strategy Consultant	Split before the wedding
Kara Williams	32	Client Service Manager	Split before the wedding
Jason Beaumont	31	Flight Attendant	Split before the wedding
Aja Johnson	28	Paralegal	Not engaged
Brandon McGhee	36	Insurance Broker	Not engaged
Brian Ngo	32	Advertising Strategist	Not engaged
Chassidy Mickale	34	Business Owner	Not engaged
Haseeb Hussain	28	Lawyer	Not engaged
Hope Antoniello	32	Sales Manager	Not engaged
Jeremy Hartwell	36	Director and Entrepreneur	Not engaged
Juhie Faheem	31	Clinical Therapist	Not engaged
Julius Cacho	39	Logistics Manager	Not engaged
Olivia Harris	29	Recruitment Partner	Not engaged
Rocky Smith	30	Executive	Not engaged
Shea'na Grigsby	36	Event Partnership Director	Not engaged
Trisha Frame	30	Real Estate Broker	Not engaged
Vito Salamone	33	Pizzeria Owner	Not engaged

=== Future appearances ===
In February 2023, Shayne Jansen appeared on the first season of Perfect Match. He finished as a finalist in a couple with Chloe Vietch.

In October 2023, Abhishek "Shake" Chatterjee competed on the first season of House of Villains and placed fifth overall.

== Episodes ==
Love Is Blind season 2 episodes
No. overall	No. in season	Title	Original release date
Week 1
15	1	"The Pods Are Open"	February 11, 2022
16	2	"Love Triangles"	February 11, 2022
17	3	"Love in Paradise"	February 11, 2022
18	4	"Meet the Other Couples"	February 11, 2022
19	5	"Leaving Paradise"	February 11, 2022
Week 2
20	6	"Back to Reality"	February 18, 2022
21	7	"A Family Affair"	February 18, 2022
22	8	"Final Adjustments"	February 18, 2022
23	9	"Bachelor & Bachelorette Parties"	February 18, 2022
Week 3
24	10	"The Weddings"	February 25, 2022
Special
25	11	"The Reunion"	March 4, 2022
After the Altar
26	12	"Friends Who Adventure Together, Stay Together"	September 16, 2022
27	13	"It's My Party and I'll Gossip If I Want to"	September 16, 2022
28	14	"The Future Looks Bright"	September 16, 2022

== Unaired engagements ==
Two couples got engaged in the pods and their relationships were not aired in the footage: Kara Williams and Jason Beaumont as well as Caitlin McKee and Joey Miller became engaged in the pods but were not filmed after their engagements. Both couples continued their relationships for several months after filming concluded, but later ended their relationships.
