= Love Is Blind season 5 =

Love Is Blind
- Season 5
- Presented by: Nick Lachey; Vanessa Lachey
- No. of episodes: 10

Release
- Original network: Netflix
- Original release: September 22 – October 15, 2023

Season chronology
- ← Previous; Season 4 Next → Season 6

The fifth season of Love Is Blind premiered on Netflix on September 22, 2023, and concluded on October 13, 2023, with a reunion episode released on October 15, 2023. The season followed singles from Houston, Texas.

== Season summary ==
Couples	Married	Still together	Relationship notes
Lydia and Milton	Yes	No	Married in May 2022. Lydia announced their separation in June 2025.
Stacy and Izzy	No	No	Split on their wedding day after Izzy said yes but Stacy said no. Izzy appeared in Season 2 of Perfect Match. He dated someone but is now single as of October 2025, and Stacy was in a relationship with a woman named Pam and then with an unknown man but is single as of October 2025.
Taylor and JP	No	No	Got engaged in the pods but broke up at the end of the Mexico trip. As of October 2025, JP and Taylor are both in relationships.

== Participants ==
All the participants lived in Houston at the time of filming.

Name	Age	Occupation	Relationship Status
Lydia Velez Gonzalez	32	Geologist	Married May 2022; Divorced 2025
James "Milton" Johnson IV	25	Petroleum Engineer	Married May 2022; Divorced 2025
Stacy Snyder	34	Director of Operations	Split at the wedding
Izzy Zapata	31	Sales	Split at the wedding
Renee Poche	32	Veterinarian	Split at the wedding (Note: This couple got engaged and traveled to Mexico, going all the way to the altar, but didn't get married. However, the relationship was not aired in the final cut.)
Carter Wall	30	Construction	Split at the wedding
Taylor Rue	26	Teacher	Split before the wedding
Jared "JP" Pierce	32	Firefighter	Split before the wedding
Paige Tillman	32	Stylist	Split before the wedding (Note: This relationship and engagement was not aired in the final cut, but it was confirmed following the airing of the season.)
Josh Simmons	32	Sales Representative	Split before the wedding
Aaliyah Cosby	29	ICU Travel Nurse	Not engaged
Christopher Fox	28	Project Manager for Commercial and Retail Development	Not engaged
Connor Moore	31	Geoscientist	Not engaged
Efrain Batista	27	Software Sales	Not engaged
Enoch Culliver	27	Financial Advisor	Not engaged
Erica Anthony	27	Marketing Manager	Not engaged
Ernesto Solorzano Jr	32	Supply Chain Manager	Not engaged
Estefania Garcia	30	Teacher and Dancer	Not engaged
Jarred Gibson	34	University Director	Not engaged
Johnie Maraist	32	Lawyer	Not engaged
Justice Currey	28	Personal Trainer	Not engaged
Linda Obi	30	Talent Acquisition Recruiter	Not engaged
Maris Prakonekham	30	HR Specialist	Not engaged
Mayra Cardenas	25	Minister	Not engaged
Miriam Amah	32	Scientist	Not engaged
Robert Martinez	30	Special Education Teacher	Not engaged
Shondra	32	Flight Attendant	Not engaged
Uche Okoroha	34	Lawyer and Entrepreneur	Not engaged

== Episodes ==
Love Is Blind season 5 episodes
No. overall	No. in season	Title	Original release date
Week 1
60	1	"So, You're a Recent Cheater?"	September 22, 2023
61	2	"Can I Talk to You for Real?"	September 22, 2023
62	3	"Blindsided"	September 22, 2023
63	4	"She's Gone...?"	September 22, 2023
Week 2
64	5	"Don't Give Up on Me"	September 29, 2023
65	6	"Going Home"	September 29, 2023
66	7	"First Class Love"	September 29, 2023
Week 3
67	8	"Love Is a Battlefield"	October 6, 2023
68	9	"Love on the Rocks"	October 6, 2023
Week 4
69	10	"Big, Big Love"	October 13, 2023
Special
70	11	"The Reunion"	October 15, 2023

== Unaired engagements and alleged sexual assault ==
In addition to the three engagements shown on the season, three additional couples got engaged in the pods:

- Renee Poche and Carter Wall got engaged in the pods and traveled to Mexico with the other couples, and cameras followed their relationship up to the altar, but the couple did not wed, and they later ended their relationship. According to Poche, she said "no" at the altar. In an interview with PopSugar, Poche divulged that producers told her the story was cut due to limited airtime available and Wall's behavior towards her, but elaborated: "I really don't know the real reason, [...] I have my own opinions on why and likely what happened, [...] I don't know if I should get into it. I will eventually, but not now."
- Paige Tillman and Josh Simmons got engaged in the pods, but producers chose not to film their relationship further. The couple returned to Houston and continued their relationship, though they ultimately decided to end their relationship and did not get married.
- An additional couple got engaged in the pods and participated in the Mexico trip, but was never shown. The female contestant filed a lawsuit against Love Is Blind production companies Kinetic Content and Delirium TV, alleging that her fiancé sexually assaulted her during the trip. She said that her fiancé "forcefully groped her, exposed himself in the nude, and repeatedly made sexual contact over her express objections" and that producers prevented her from leaving and forced her to film a final scene. The production companies denied the claims and called them "meritless." All footage of the couple was cut and their names were omitted from the cast list.

== Reception ==
Season 5 of Love is Blind was among Netflix's Top 10 series worldwide during its premiere week of September 18–24, 2023, and remained in the top 10 the following week.

Critics of the show noted the high level of emotional conflict in the season's story lines and remarked on the show's ability to stay fresh by focusing on a different group of people each season.
