= Love Is Blind season 10 =

Season of American television series (2026)

Love Is Blind
- Season 10
- Presented by: Nick Lachey; Vanessa Lachey
- No. of episodes: 13

Release
- Original network: Netflix
- Original release: February 11 – March 11, 2026

Additional information
- Filming dates: March 22 – April 21, 2025

Season chronology
- ← Previous; Season 9 Next → Season 11

The tenth season of Love Is Blind premiered on Netflix on February 11, 2026 and concluded on March 11, 2026. This season followed singles from Ohio. Unlike previous seasons, which have focused on singles from a specific city, this season included singles from all over the state.

== Season summary ==
Couples	Married	Still together	Relationship notes
Christine and Victor	Yes	Yes	Married in April 2025
Amber and Jordan	Yes	No	Married in April 2025. During the reunion, it was announced that they separated a few months after filming. Amber explained that Jordan declined to move in together and that she did not feel like he was spending enough time together after getting married, which made her think that he was not ready for marriage. With Jordan, he did not feel like he was appreciated during their marriage. During the reunion, it was revealed that they are both single.
Ashley and Alex H.	No	No	At the altar, Alex is asked first but Ashley interjects and says that she is saying no. Ashley explains that after leaving the pods, she felt that Alex was putting in no effort into their relationship and compared it to feeling like roommates. During the reunion, it was revealed that they are both single.
Emma and Mike	No	No	At the altar, Emma says yes while Mike says no. A big part of this relationship was Emma's hesitation to having kids and Mike being very adamant about wanting them. While Emma eventually started feeling comfortable about having kids, Mike decided to say no because he wanted to be with someone who was absolutely sure about children. During the reunion, Mike announced that he had gotten into a new relationship.
Brittany W. and Devo	No	No	On the morning of their wedding day, Devo has doubts on whether or not he can love Brittany how she deserves to be. While Brittany frames their conversation as not the end of their relationship and believing they will get married one day, Devo is less sure and not sure exactly how he feels. The two decide to stay in touch and figure their relationship out, but the two did officially break up shortly after filming. During the reunion, it is revealed that Devo is in a new relationship and engaged.
Bri and Connor	No	No	Two days before the weddings, Bri and Connor talk about her reservations with saying yes at the altar. While complimenting him numerous times, Bri brings up how she doesn't think that Connor is getting the best version of herself. During the conversation, Bri says that she is not ready to walk down the aisle, but the two do want see if they can work through it together. The two stated that they were still together during the reunion, but TMZ was told in May 2026 that the two have since split up.
Jessica and Chris	No	No	During a conversation about their communication expectations, Chris asks if Jessica thinks they have a strong physical connection. Chris admits that he's struggling with his attraction to her due to her not working out every day, and then he admits that he's been thinking about what it would have been like if he chose Bri, his other pod connection. Jessica, feeling disrespected and like she was always honest about her lifestyle, decides to leave and go back home. During the reunion, it was revealed that Jessica has since gotten into a relationship with fellow participant Haramol Gill.

== Participants ==
All participants lived in Ohio at the time of filming.

Name	Age	Occupation	Relationship status
Christine Hamilton	31	Speech-Language Pathologist	Married April 2025
Victor St. John	34	Professor	Married April 2025
Amber Morrison	34	Nurse Practitioner	Married April 2025; Currently separated
Jordan Faeth	34	Account Executive	Married April 2025; Currently separated
Bri McNees	34	Senior Merchant	Split after filming (Note: This couple did not get married on the show's wedding date, but they did stay together after filming. Reportedly, they have since split up.)
Connor Spies	32	Account Management	Split after filming
Brittany Wicker	33	Registered Nurse	Split after filming (Note: The two did stay together despite deciding to not get married on show's wedding day, but they did officially break up shortly after filming)
Devonta "Devo" Anderson	32	Loan Officer	Split after filming
Ashley Carpenter	34	Claims Manager	Split at the wedding
Alex Henderson	31	Financial Sales	Split at the wedding
Emma Betsinger	28	Retail Merchandising	Split at the wedding
Mike Gibney	30	Sales Manager	Split at the wedding
Jessica Barrett	39	Infectious Disease Physician	Split before the wedding
Chris Fusco	33	Account Executive	Split before the wedding
Elissa Finley	39	Nurse	Split before the wedding (Note: This relationship and engagement was not aired in the final cut, but it was confirmed during the airing of the season)
Miguel Lopez	32	Software Engineer	Split before the wedding
Alex Lowrie	33	Assistant Controller	Not engaged
Brennan O’Callaghan	30	Accounting and Finance Manager	Not engaged
Haramol Gill	36	E.R. Doctor	Not engaged
Kevan Jones	32	Realtor	Not engaged
Kevin Verhoef	35	Certified Public Accountant	Not engaged
Parker Knapp	29	Business Owner	Not engaged
Steven Sunday	32	Finance	Not engaged
Tyler Hunt	32	Management Consultant	Not engaged
Brittany S.	37	Flight Attendant	Not engaged
Bry Thomas	30	Commercial Real Estate Agent	Not engaged
Dynasty Ballard	33	Senior Marketing Manager	Not engaged
Jennifer Underwood	32	Financial Professional	Not engaged
Keya Kellum	31	Marketing Director	Not engaged
Priyanka Grandhi	34	Recruiter	Not engaged
Rosalyn Ransaw	31	Marketing Manager	Not engaged
Tyler Lanier	33	Sales Leader	Not engaged

== Episodes ==
"Love Is Blind" season 8 Episodes
No. overall	No. in season	Title	Original release date
Week 1
124	1	"Honey, I'm Home"	February 11, 2026
125	2	"A Sticky Situation"	February 11, 2026
126	3	"Um, Redo!"	February 11, 2026
127	4	"Stage Five Clinger"	February 11, 2026
128	5	"Where the Hell is My Husband?"	February 11, 2026
129	6	"Never Have I Ever"	February 11, 2026
Week 2
130	7	"Moving In and Unpacking Baggage"	February 18, 2026
131	8	"A Snake in the Grass"	February 18, 2026
132	9	"I'm Just Being Honest"	February 18, 2026
Week 3
133	10	"Vanishing Mode"	February 25, 2026
134	11	"See Where the Chips Fall"	February 25, 2026
Week 4
135	12	"Head vs. Heart"	March 4, 2026
Special
136	13	"The Reunion"	March 11, 2026

== Unaired engagement ==
In addition to the seven couples followed throughout the season, at least one other couple got engaged in the pods:

- Elissa Finley and Miguel Lopez got engaged in the pods but are no longer together. According to Elissa, the two went back to Ohio only for Miguel to announce that he was moving to Tampa immediately after returning. Miguel then proceeded to ghost Elissa, at least partially due to Elissa knowing his previous fiancée.
