= Primetime Emmy Award for Outstanding Reality Program =

Award category at the Creative Arts Emmy Awards

The Primetime Emmy Award for Outstanding Reality Program (known as Outstanding Non-Fiction Program (Reality) in 2001 and 2002, and Outstanding Reality/Competition Program in 2003) was a category award handed out annually at the Creative Arts Emmy Award ceremony.

In 2014, Outstanding Reality Program was separated into two categories – Outstanding Structured Reality Program and Outstanding Unstructured Reality Program.

== Winners and nominations ==
=== 2000s ===
Year	Program	Producers	Network
Outstanding Non-Fiction Program (Reality)
2001	American High	R. J. Cutler, executive producer/director; Brian Medavoy, Erwin More and Cheryl Stanley, executive producers; Dan Partland, supervising producer; Richard Bye, Jonathan Chinn, Nicholas Doob, Jonathan Mednick and Molly O'Brien, producers	Fox
2001	The Awful Truth with Michael Moore	Michael Moore, host/writer/director/executive producer; Michael Donovan and Kathleen Glynn, executive producers; Dave Hamilton, co-executive producer; Tia Lessin and Charlie Siskel, supervising producers; Rob Huebel, Marc Johnson and Nick McKinney, producers	Bravo
2001	The E! True Hollywood Story	Jeff Shore, executive producer; Robert Bentley, supervising producer; Eric Shepard, producer	E!
2001	Taxicab Confessions	Harry Gantz and Joe Gantz, producer/directors	HBO
2001	Trauma: Life in the E.R.	Stephen H. Schwartz and Liane Thompson, executive producers; Michael Selditch, producer	TLC
2002	The Osbournes	Lois Clark Curren, R. Greg Johnston and Jeff Stilson, executive producers; Jonathan Taylor, supervising producer; Rod Aissa and Sharon Osbourne, producers	MTV
2002	American High	R. J. Cutler, Brian Medavoy, Erwin More and Cheryl Stanley, executive producers; Dan Partland, supervising producer; Richard Bye, Jonathan Chinn, Nicholas Doob, Alison Ellwood, Jonathan Mednick, Molly O'Brien and Ted Skillman, producers	PBS
2002	Frontier House	Alex Graham and Beth Hoppe, executive producers; Simon Shaw, series producer; Nicolas Brown and Maro Chermayeff, director/producer	PBS
2002	Project Greenlight	Ben Affleck, Sean Bailey, Billy Campbell, Matt Damon, Chris Moore, Harvey Weinstein and Bob Weinstein, executive producers; Liz Bronstein, co-executive producer; Tina Gazzerro, Eli Holzman and Tony Yates, producer	HBO
2002	Taxicab Confessions	Sheila Nevins, executive producer; Julie Anderson and Felicia Caplan, supervising producers; Harry Gantz and Joe Gantz, producer/directors	HBO
2002	Trauma: Life in the E.R.	Stephen H. Schwartz and Liane Thompson, executive producers; Catherine McCarthy, Brian Seligson and Stacia Thompson, producers	TLC
Outstanding Reality/Competition Program
2003	The Amazing Race (Seasons 3–4)	Bertram van Munster, Jerry Bruckheimer and Jonathan Littman, executive producers; Scott Einziger and Hayma "Screech" Washington, co-executive producers; Anthony Dominici and Rick Ringbakk, supervising producers; Brady Connell, Elise Doganieri, Julian Grimmond, Michael Norton, Bob Parr, Ben Samek, Evan Weinstein and Tammara Wells, producers; Phil Keoghan, host	CBS
2003	100 Years of Hope and Humor	Linda Hope and Gary Smith, executive producers; Dann Netter, producer	NBC
2003	AFI's 100 Years...100 Passions	Gary Smith, executive producer; Frederick S. Pierce, executive producer for AFI; Bob Gazzale, Dann Netter and Fred A. Rappoport, producers	CBS
2003	American Idol (Seasons 1–2)	Cecile Frot-Coutaz, Simon Fuller and Simon Jones, executive producers; Nigel Lythgoe and Ken Warwick, co-executive producers; David Goffin, supervising producer; Charles Boyd, senior producer; John Entz and Beth McNamara, producers; Ryan Seacrest, host; Simon Cowell, Randy Jackson and Paula Abdul, judges	Fox
2003	Survivor (Seasons 5–6)	Mark Burnett and Charlie Parsons, executive producers; Craig Armstrong, co-executive producer; Jay Bienstock and Tom Shelly, supervising producers; Cord Keller, senior producer; Maria Baltazzi, Bruce Beresford-Redman, Luciana Brafman Bienstock, Adam Briles, James Bruce, John Feist, Teri Kennedy, Doug McCallie, Cathrine Nilsen and Conrad Riggs, producers; Jeff Probst, host	CBS
Outstanding Reality Program
2004	Queer Eye for the Straight Guy	Christian Barcellos, Frances Berwick, David Collins, Amy Introcaso-Davis, David Metzler and Michael Williams, executive producers; Lynn Sadofsky, supervising producer; Jill Danton, producer; Ted Allen, Kyan Douglas, Thom Filicia, Carson Kressley and Jai Rodriguez, hosts	Bravo
2004	Colonial House	Beth Hoppe and Leanne Klein, executive producers; Sallie Clement, series producer; Nicolas Brown, producer	PBS
2004	Extreme Makeover: Home Edition	Tom Forman and Craig Armstrong, executive producers; Luis Barreto and Janelle Fiorito, co-executive producers; Conrad L. Ricketts, senior producer; Mike Maloy, supervising producer; Mark Rains, producer	ABC
2004	Penn & Teller: Bullshit!	Mark Wolper and Star Price, executive producers; Penn Jillette, Teller, Michael Goudeau and Peter Adam Golden, co-executive producers; Shari Adagio, supervising producer	Showtime
2004	Project Greenlight	Ben Affleck, Sean Bailey, Dan Cutforth, Matt Damon, Jane Lipsitz, Chris Moore, Bob Osher, Harvey Weinstein and Bob Weinstein, executive producers; Tony Yates, co-executive producer; Randy Sacks, supervising producer; Eli Holzman, producer	HBO
2005	Extreme Makeover: Home Edition	Tom Forman, executive producer; Denise Cramsey, co-executive producer; Conrad L. Ricketts, senior producer; Mike Maloy, supervising producer; Andrew Lipson, Diane Korman and Emily Sinclair, producers; Ty Pennington, host	ABC
2005	Antiques Roadshow	Marsha Bemko, executive producer; Robert Marshall, series producer; Mark L. Walberg, host	PBS
2005	Penn & Teller: Bullshit!	Mark Wolper and Star Price, executive producers; Penn Jillette, Teller, Tim Rogan, Michael Goudeau, Peter Adam Golden and Ken Krasher Lewis, co-executive producers; Jon Hotchkiss and Shari Adagio, supervising producers; Patti Duce and Joshua E. Kessler, senior producers; Renee Y. Henson, Randall Kirk, June Molgaard, Tammie Smalls and Aaron Yampolski, series producers	Showtime
2005	Project Greenlight	Ben Affleck, Sean Bailey, Dan Cutforth, Matt Damon, Jane Lipsitz, Chris Moore, Bob Osher, Harvey Weinstein and Bob Weinstein, executive producers; Frances Berwick, Andrew Cohen and David Serwatka, executive producer for Bravo; Rich Buhrman, co-executive producer; Casey Kriley, senior producer; Gayle Gawlowski and Kevin Morra, supervising producers; Jennifer Berman, Eli Holzman, Marc Joubert, Alexandra Lipsitz, Barbara Schneeweiss and Larry Tanz, producers	Bravo
2005	Queer Eye for the Straight Guy	Christian Barcellos, Frances Berwick, Andrew Cohen, David Collins, Amy Introcaso-Davis, David Metzler and Michael Williams, executive producers; Linda Lea, co-executive producer; Lynn Sadofsky, supervising producer; Ted Allen, Kyan Douglas, Thom Filicia, Carson Kressley and Jai Rodriguez, hosts	Bravo
2006	Extreme Makeover: Home Edition	Tom Forman, executive producer; Denise Cramsey, Conrad L. Ricketts and Mike Maloy, co-executive producers; Andrew Lipson, Matt Fisher, Courtney MacGregor and Charisse Simonian, producers; Ty Pennington, host	ABC
2006	Antiques Roadshow	Marsha Bemko, executive producer; Mark L. Walberg, host	PBS
2006	The Dog Whisperer	Jim Milio, Melissa Jo Peltier and Mark Hufnail, executive producers; SueAnn Fincke, series producer; Colette Beaudry, supervising producer; Sheila Possner Emery and Kay Bachman Sumner, producers; Cesar Millan, host	Nat Geo
2006	Kathy Griffin: My Life on the D-List	Marcia Mule, Bryan Scott, Lisa M. Tucker, Kathy Griffin, Frances Berwick, Amy Introcaso-Davis and Rachel Smith, executive producers; Beth Wichterich, supervising producer; Matthew Lahey, producer	Bravo
2006	Penn & Teller: Bullshit!	Mark Wolper and Star Price, executive producers; Penn Jillette, Teller, Tim Rogan, Michael Goudeau and Jon Hotchkiss, co-executive producers	Showtime
2007	Kathy Griffin: My Life on the D-List	Marcia Mule, Bryan Scott, Lisa M. Tucker, Kathy Griffin, Cori Abraham, Frances Berwick and Amy Introcaso-Davis, executive producers; Lenid Rolov, Beth Wichterich and Kelly Luegenbiehl, supervising producers	Bravo
2007	Antiques Roadshow	Marsha Bemko, executive producer; Sam Farrell, supervising producer; Mark L. Walberg, host	PBS
2007	Dog Whisperer with Cesar Milan	Jim Milio, Melissa Jo Peltier and Mark Hufnail, executive producers; SueAnn Fincke, series producer; Char Serwa, supervising producer; Sheila Possner Emery and Kay Bachman Sumner, producers; Cesar Millan, host	Nat Geo
2007	Extreme Makeover: Home Edition	Denise Cramsey, executive producer; Conrad L. Ricketts and Dan Morando, co-executive producers; Max Swedlow, supervising producer; Diane Korman, senior producer; John "J.P." Gilbert, Kathryn Vaughan, Jenifer Faison, Patrick Higgins, Andrew Lipson, Matt Fisher and Herb Ankrom, producers; Robert Day, produced by; Ty Pennington, host	ABC
2007	Penn & Teller: Bullshit!	Mark Wolper, Star Price, Penn Jillette and Teller, executive producers; Tim Rogan, Peter Adam Golden, Ken Krasher Lewis, Michael Goudeau, Jon Hotchkiss and Steven Uhlenberg, co-executive producers; Patti Duce, Joshua Kessler and Shari Adagio, supervising producers	Showtime
2008	Kathy Griffin: My Life on the D-List	Marcia Mule, Bryan Scott, Lisa M. Tucker, Kathy Griffin, Cori Abraham, Frances Berwick, Amy Introcaso-Davis and Christopher Carlson, executive producers; Amy Kohn, supervising producer	Bravo
2008	Antiques Roadshow	Marsha Bemko, executive producer; Sam Farrell, supervising producer	PBS
2008	Dirty Jobs	Craig Piligian, Eddie Barbini and Mary Donahue, executive producers; Eddie Rohwedder, supervising producer; Mike Rowe, Dave Barsky, Leigh Purinton, Kenitra Ford and Heath Banks, producers	Discovery
2008	Extreme Makeover: Home Edition	Denise Cramsey and Conrad L. Ricketts, executive producers; Dan Morando and Brady Connell, co-executive producers; Max Swedlow, supervising producer; Diane Korman, senior producer; Herb Ankrom and Matt Fisher, producers; Jeanne Kazumi Petrone, produced by	ABC
2008	Intervention	Gary R. Benz, Michael Branton, Bryn Freedman, Sam Mettler and Dan Partland, executive producers; Robert Sharenow and Colleen Conway, executive producers for A&E; Karen Pinto and Jeff Grogan, supervising producers; Timothy Coston, supervising sound producer	A&E
2009	Intervention	Gary R. Benz, Michael Branton, Sam Mettler, Dan Partland, Robert Sharenow and Colleen Conway, executive producers; Jeff Grogan, supervising producer; Trisha Kirk Redding and Sarah Skibitzke, producers; Kurt Schemper, produced by; Timothy Coston, supervising sound producer	A&E
2009	Antiques Roadshow	Marsha Bemko, executive producer; Sam Farrell, supervising producer	PBS
2009	Dirty Jobs	Craig Piligian, Eddie Barbini, Mike Rowe and Gena McCarthy, executive producers; Eddie Rohwedder and Scott Popjes, supervising producers; Dave Barsky, producer	Discovery
2009	Dog Whisperer	Jim Milio, Melissa Jo Peltier and Mark Hufnail, executive producers; SueAnn Fincke, series producer; Sheila Possner Emery and Kay Bachman Sumner, producers	Nat Geo
2009	Kathy Griffin: My Life on the D-List	Marcia Mule, Bryan Scott, Lisa M. Tucker, Kathy Griffin, Cori Abraham, Andy Cohen and Jenn Levy, executive producers; Amy Kohn, co-executive producer	Bravo
2009	MythBusters	Mary Donahue, senior executive producer; John Luscombe and Dan Tapster, executive producers; Rob Hammersley, co-executive producer; Tracy Rudolph, supervising producer; Alice Dallow and Tabitha Lentle, producers	Discovery

=== 2010s ===
Year	Program	Producers	Network
2010 (62nd)
2010 (62nd)	Jamie Oliver's Food Revolution	Jamie Oliver, Ryan Seacrest, Craig Armstrong, Adam Sher, and Roy Ackerman, executive producers; Charles Wachter, Zoe Collins, and Jason Henry, co-executive producer; Anthony Carbone and Joe Coleman, supervising producers	ABC
2010 (62nd)	Antiques Roadshow	Marsha Bemko, executive producer; Sam Farrell, supervising producer	PBS
2010 (62nd)	Dirty Jobs	Craig Piligian, Eddie Barbini, and Mike Rowe, executive producers; Tim Pastore, executive producer for Discovery; Scott Popjes and Dave Barsky, supervising producers; Leigh Purinton, producer	Discovery
2010 (62nd)	Kathy Griffin: My Life on the D-List	Michael Levitt, Kathy Griffin, Bryan Scott, Lisa Tucker, Cori Abraham, Andrew Cohen and Jenn Levy, executive producers; Amber Mazzola, co-executive producer; Kelly Welsh, supervising producer; Blake Webster, producer	Bravo
2010 (62nd)	MythBusters	John Luscombe and Dan Tapster, executive producers; Tracy Rudolph and Steve Christiansen, supervising producers; Alice Dallow and Wendy Woll, producers	Discovery
2010 (62nd)	Undercover Boss	Eli Holzman, Stephen Lambert, Shauna Minoprio, and Stef Wagstaffe, executive producers; Alex Weresow, supervising producer	CBS
2011 (63rd)
2011 (63rd)	Deadliest Catch	Thom Beers and Jeff Conroy, executive producers; Paul Gasek and Tracy Rudolph, executive producers for Discovery; Matt Renner, co-executive producer; Sheila McCormack, supervising producer; Ethan Prochnik, series producer; Steven Robillard, senior producer; Todd Stanley, producer	Discovery
2011 (63rd)	Antiques Roadshow	Marsha Bemko, executive producer; Sam Farrell, supervising producer	PBS
2011 (63rd)	Hoarders	Matt Chan, Dave Severson, and Jodi Flynn, executive producers; Robert Sharenow and Andrew Berg, executive producers for A&E; George Butts and Pat Barnes, series producers	A&E
2011 (63rd)	Kathy Griffin: My Life on the D-List	Bryan Scott, Lisa M. Tucker, Kathy Griffin, Danny Salles, Cori Abraham, Andrew Cohen, and Jenn Levy, executive producers	Bravo
2011 (63rd)	MythBusters	Jamie Hyneman, Adam Savage, Dan Tapster, and John Luscombe, executive producers; Tracy Rudolph, executive producer for Discovery; Alice Dallow and Lauren Williams, producers	Discovery
2011 (63rd)	Undercover Boss	Eli Holzman, Stephen Lambert, and Chris Carlson, executive producers; Susan Hoenig and Sandi Johnson, co-executive producers; Allison Schermerhorn, Erica Hanson, Scott Cooper, Allison Chase Coleman, and Lety Quintanar, supervising producers	CBS
2012 (64th)
2012 (64th)	Undercover Boss (Season 3)	Eli Holzman, Stephen Lambert, and Chris Carlson, executive producers; Scott Cooper, and Sandi Johnson, co-executive producers; Rachelle Mendez, Lety Quintanar, and Rebekah Fry, supervising producers	CBS
2012 (64th)	Antiques Roadshow	Marsha Bemko, executive producer; Sam Farrell, supervising producer	PBS
2012 (64th)	Jamie Oliver's Food Revolution	Ryan Seacrest, Jamie Oliver, Craig Armstrong, Adam Sher, and Roy Ackerman, executive producers; Charles Wachter, Zoe Collins, and Jason Henry, co-executive producers; Robert Norris, producer	ABC
2012 (64th)	MythBusters	Jamie Hyneman, Adam Savage, Dan Tapster, Tracy Rudolph, and John Luscombe, executive producers; Alice Dallow and Lauren Williams, producers	Discovery
2012 (64th)	Shark Tank (Season 3)	Mark Burnett, Clay Newbill, and Phil Gurin, executive producers; Yun Lingner, Brien Meagher, David Eilenberg, and Jim Roush, co-executive producers; Rhett Bachner and Bill Gaudsmith, supervising producers; Becky Blitz, senior producer	ABC
2012 (64th)	Who Do You Think You Are?	Alex Graham, Jennifer O'Connell, Lisa Kudrow, Dan Bucatinsky, and Al Edgington, executive producers; Lisa Bohacek, Kate Richter Green, supervising producers; Chuck LaBella, producer	NBC
2013 (65th)
2013 (65th)	Undercover Boss (Season 4)	Eli Holzman, Stephen Lambert, and Chris Carlson, executive producers; Scott Cooper, and Sandi Johnson, co-executive producers; Rachelle Mendez, Lety Quintanar, and Rebekah Fry, Marlon "Goose" Wall, supervising producers	CBS
2013 (65th)	Antiques Roadshow	Marsha Bemko, executive producer; Sam Farrell, supervising producer	PBS
2013 (65th)	Deadliest Catch	Thom Beers, Jeff Conroy, and David Pritikin, executive producers; John Gray, and Sheila McCormack, co-executive producers; Decker Watson and Sean Dash, series producers	Discovery
2013 (65th)	Diners, Drive-Ins and Dives	Frank Matson, Kat Higgins, and Tim McOsker, executive producers	Food
2013 (65th)	MythBusters	Jamie Hyneman, Adam Savage, Dan Tapster, John Luscombe, and Cameo Wallace, executive producers; Lauren Williams and Steve Christiansen, senior producers; Dennis Kwon, Linda Wolkovitch, and Brian Dean, producers	Discovery
2013 (65th)	Shark Tank (Season 4)'	Mark Burnett, Clay Newbill, Phil Gurin, executive producers; Yun Lingner, Max Swedlow, Jim Roush, and Carl Hansen, co-executive producers; Bill Gaudsmith, and Joni Day, supervising producers; Becky Blitz, senior producer	ABC

== See also ==
- Critics' Choice Television Award for Best Reality Series
