= Primetime Emmy Award for Outstanding Unstructured Reality Program =

American television award

Primetime Emmy Award for Unstructured Reality Program
- Awarded for: Outstanding Unstructured Reality Program
- Country: United States
- Presented by: Academy of Television Arts & Sciences
- First award: 2014
- Currently held by: Love on the Spectrum (2026)
- Website: emmys.com

The Primetime Emmy Award for Outstanding Unstructured Reality Program is handed out annually at the Creative Arts Emmy Award ceremony.

In 2014, Outstanding Reality Program was separated into two categories – Outstanding Structured Reality Program and Outstanding Unstructured Reality Program. The category of "unstructured reality program" is defined as consisting of reality shows that "contain story elements driven by the actions of characters and lacking a consistent structured template."

In the following list, the first titles listed in gold are the winners; those not in gold are nominees, which are listed in alphabetical order. The years given are those in which the ceremonies took place:

== Winners and nominations ==
Outstanding Reality Program

=== 2000s ===
Year	Program	Producers	Network
2001 (54th)	American High	R. J. Cutler, executive producer/director; Brian Medavoy, Erwin More and Cheryl Stanley, executive producers; Dan Partland, supervising producer; Richard Bye, Jonathan Chinn, Nicholas Doob, Jonathan Mednick and Molly O'Brien, producers	Fox
2001 (54th)	The Awful Truth with Michael Moore	Michael Moore, host/writer/director/executive producer; Michael Donovan and Kathleen Glynn, executive producers; Dave Hamilton, co-executive producer; Tia Lessin and Charlie Siskel, supervising producers; Rob Huebel, Marc Johnson and Nick McKinney, producers	Bravo
2001 (54th)	The E! True Hollywood Story	Jeff Shore, executive producer; Robert Bentley, supervising producer; Eric Shepard, producer	E!
2001 (54th)	Taxicab Confessions	Harry Gantz and Joe Gantz, producer/directors	HBO
2001 (54th)	Trauma: Life in the E.R.	Stephen H. Schwartz and Liane Thompson, executive producers; Michael Selditch, producer	TLC
2002 (55th)	The Osbournes	Lois Clark Curren, R. Greg Johnston and Jeff Stilson, executive producers; Jonathan Taylor, supervising producer; Rod Aissa and Sharon Osbourne, producers	MTV
2002 (55th)	American High	R. J. Cutler, Brian Medavoy, Erwin More and Cheryl Stanley, executive producers; Dan Partland, supervising producer; Richard Bye, Jonathan Chinn, Nicholas Doob, Alison Ellwood, Jonathan Mednick, Molly O'Brien and Ted Skillman, producers	PBS
2002 (55th)	Frontier House	Alex Graham and Beth Hoppe, executive producers; Simon Shaw, series producer; Nicolas Brown and Maro Chermayeff, director/producer	PBS
2002 (55th)	Project Greenlight	Ben Affleck, Sean Bailey, Billy Campbell, Matt Damon, Chris Moore, Harvey Weinstein and Bob Weinstein, executive producers; Liz Bronstein, co-executive producer; Tina Gazzerro, Eli Holzman and Tony Yates, producer	HBO
2002 (55th)	Taxicab Confessions	Sheila Nevins, executive producer; Julie Anderson and Felicia Caplan, supervising producers; Harry Gantz and Joe Gantz, producer/directors	HBO
2002 (55th)	Trauma: Life in the E.R.	Stephen H. Schwartz and Liane Thompson, executive producers; Catherine McCarthy, Brian Seligson and Stacia Thompson, producers	TLC
2004 (56th)	Queer Eye for the Straight Guy	Christian Barcellos, Frances Berwick, David Collins, Amy Introcaso-Davis, David Metzler and Michael Williams, executive producers; Lynn Sadofsky, supervising producer; Jill Danton, producer; Ted Allen, Kyan Douglas, Thom Filicia, Carson Kressley and Jai Rodriguez, hosts	Bravo
2004 (56th)	Colonial House	Beth Hoppe and Leanne Klein, executive producers; Sallie Clement, series producer; Nicolas Brown, producer	PBS
2004 (56th)	Extreme Makeover: Home Edition	Tom Forman and Craig Armstrong, executive producers; Luis Barreto and Janelle Fiorito, co-executive producers; Conrad L. Ricketts, senior producer; Mike Maloy, supervising producer; Mark Rains, producer	ABC
2004 (56th)	Penn & Teller: Bullshit!	Mark Wolper and Star Price, executive producers; Penn Jillette, Teller, Michael Goudeau and Peter Adam Golden, co-executive producers; Shari Adagio, supervising producer	Showtime
2004 (56th)	Project Greenlight	Ben Affleck, Sean Bailey, Dan Cutforth, Matt Damon, Jane Lipsitz, Chris Moore, Bob Osher, Harvey Weinstein and Bob Weinstein, executive producers; Tony Yates, co-executive producer; Randy Sacks, supervising producer; Eli Holzman, producer	HBO
2005 (57th)	Extreme Makeover: Home Edition	Tom Forman, executive producer; Denise Cramsey, co-executive producer; Conrad L. Ricketts, senior producer; Mike Maloy, supervising producer; Andrew Lipson, Diane Korman and Emily Sinclair, producers; Ty Pennington, host	ABC
2005 (57th)	Antiques Roadshow	Marsha Bemko, executive producer; Robert Marshall, series producer; Mark L. Walberg, host	PBS
2005 (57th)	Penn & Teller: Bullshit!	Mark Wolper and Star Price, executive producers; Penn Jillette, Teller, Tim Rogan, Michael Goudeau, Peter Adam Golden and Ken Krasher Lewis, co-executive producers; Jon Hotchkiss and Shari Adagio, supervising producers; Patti Duce and Joshua E. Kessler, senior producers; Renee Y. Henson, Randall Kirk, June Molgaard, Tammie Smalls and Aaron Yampolski, series producers	Showtime
2005 (57th)	Project Greenlight	Ben Affleck, Sean Bailey, Dan Cutforth, Matt Damon, Jane Lipsitz, Chris Moore, Bob Osher, Harvey Weinstein and Bob Weinstein, executive producers; Frances Berwick, Andrew Cohen and David Serwatka, executive producer for Bravo; Rich Buhrman, co-executive producer; Casey Kriley, senior producer; Gayle Gawlowski and Kevin Morra, supervising producers; Jennifer Berman, Eli Holzman, Marc Joubert, Alexandra Lipsitz, Barbara Schneeweiss and Larry Tanz, producers	Bravo
2005 (57th)	Queer Eye for the Straight Guy	Christian Barcellos, Frances Berwick, Andrew Cohen, David Collins, Amy Introcaso-Davis, David Metzler and Michael Williams, executive producers; Linda Lea, co-executive producer; Lynn Sadofsky, supervising producer; Ted Allen, Kyan Douglas, Thom Filicia, Carson Kressley and Jai Rodriguez, hosts	Bravo
2006 (58th)	Extreme Makeover: Home Edition	Tom Forman, executive producer; Denise Cramsey, Conrad L. Ricketts and Mike Maloy, co-executive producers; Andrew Lipson, Matt Fisher, Courtney MacGregor and Charisse Simonian, producers; Ty Pennington, host	ABC
2006 (58th)	Antiques Roadshow	Marsha Bemko, executive producer; Mark L. Walberg, host	PBS
2006 (58th)	The Dog Whisperer	Jim Milio, Melissa Jo Peltier and Mark Hufnail, executive producers; SueAnn Fincke, series producer; Colette Beaudry, supervising producer; Sheila Possner Emery and Kay Bachman Sumner, producers; Cesar Millan, host	Nat Geo
2006 (58th)	Kathy Griffin: My Life on the D-List	Marcia Mule, Bryan Scott, Lisa M. Tucker, Kathy Griffin, Frances Berwick, Amy Introcaso-Davis and Rachel Smith, executive producers; Beth Wichterich, supervising producer; Matthew Lahey, producer	Bravo
2006 (58th)	Penn & Teller: Bullshit!	Mark Wolper and Star Price, executive producers; Penn Jillette, Teller, Tim Rogan, Michael Goudeau and Jon Hotchkiss, co-executive producers	Showtime
2007 (59th)	Kathy Griffin: My Life on the D-List	Marcia Mule, Bryan Scott, Lisa M. Tucker, Kathy Griffin, Cori Abraham, Frances Berwick and Amy Introcaso-Davis, executive producers; Lenid Rolov, Beth Wichterich and Kelly Luegenbiehl, supervising producers	Bravo
2007 (59th)	Antiques Roadshow	Marsha Bemko, executive producer; Sam Farrell, supervising producer; Mark L. Walberg, host	PBS
2007 (59th)	Dog Whisperer with Cesar Milan	Jim Milio, Melissa Jo Peltier and Mark Hufnail, executive producers; SueAnn Fincke, series producer; Char Serwa, supervising producer; Sheila Possner Emery and Kay Bachman Sumner, producers; Cesar Millan, host	Nat Geo
2007 (59th)	Extreme Makeover: Home Edition	Denise Cramsey, executive producer; Conrad L. Ricketts and Dan Morando, co-executive producers; Max Swedlow, supervising producer; Diane Korman, senior producer; John "J.P." Gilbert, Kathryn Vaughan, Jenifer Faison, Patrick Higgins, Andrew Lipson, Matt Fisher and Herb Ankrom, producers; Robert Day, produced by; Ty Pennington, host	ABC
2007 (59th)	Penn & Teller: Bullshit!	Mark Wolper, Star Price, Penn Jillette and Teller, executive producers; Tim Rogan, Peter Adam Golden, Ken Krasher Lewis, Michael Goudeau, Jon Hotchkiss and Steven Uhlenberg, co-executive producers; Patti Duce, Joshua Kessler and Shari Adagio, supervising producers	Showtime
2008 (60th)	Kathy Griffin: My Life on the D-List	Marcia Mule, Bryan Scott, Lisa M. Tucker, Kathy Griffin, Cori Abraham, Frances Berwick, Amy Introcaso-Davis and Christopher Carlson, executive producers; Amy Kohn, supervising producer	Bravo
2008 (60th)	Antiques Roadshow	Marsha Bemko, executive producer; Sam Farrell, supervising producer	PBS
2008 (60th)	Dirty Jobs	Craig Piligian, Eddie Barbini and Mary Donahue, executive producers; Eddie Rohwedder, supervising producer; Mike Rowe, Dave Barsky, Leigh Purinton, Kenitra Ford and Heath Banks, producers	Discovery
2008 (60th)	Extreme Makeover: Home Edition	Denise Cramsey and Conrad L. Ricketts, executive producers; Dan Morando and Brady Connell, co-executive producers; Max Swedlow, supervising producer; Diane Korman, senior producer; Herb Ankrom and Matt Fisher, producers; Jeanne Kazumi Petrone, produced by	ABC
2008 (60th)	Intervention	Gary R. Benz, Michael Branton, Bryn Freedman, Sam Mettler and Dan Partland, executive producers; Robert Sharenow and Colleen Conway, executive producers for A&E; Karen Pinto and Jeff Grogan, supervising producers	A&E
2009 (61st)	Intervention	Gary R. Benz, Michael Branton, Sam Mettler, Dan Partland, Robert Sharenow and Colleen Conway, executive producers; Jeff Grogan, supervising producer; Trisha Kirk Redding and Sarah Skibitzke, producers; Kurt Schemper, produced by	A&E
2009 (61st)	Antiques Roadshow	Marsha Bemko, executive producer; Sam Farrell, supervising producer	PBS
2009 (61st)	Dirty Jobs	Craig Piligian, Eddie Barbini, Mike Rowe and Gena McCarthy, executive producers; Eddie Rohwedder and Scott Popjes, supervising producers; Dave Barsky, producer	Discovery
2009 (61st)	Dog Whisperer	Jim Milio, Melissa Jo Peltier and Mark Hufnail, executive producers; SueAnn Fincke, series producer; Sheila Possner Emery and Kay Bachman Sumner, producers	Nat Geo
2009 (61st)	Kathy Griffin: My Life on the D-List	Marcia Mule, Bryan Scott, Lisa M. Tucker, Kathy Griffin, Cori Abraham, Andy Cohen and Jenn Levy, executive producers; Amy Kohn, co-executive producer	Bravo
2009 (61st)	MythBusters	Mary Donahue, senior executive producer; John Luscombe and Dan Tapster, executive producers; Rob Hammersley, co-executive producer; Tracy Rudolph, supervising producer; Alice Dallow and Tabitha Lentle, producers	Discovery

=== 2010s ===
Year	Program	Producers	Network
2010 (62nd)
2010 (62nd)	Jamie Oliver's Food Revolution	Jamie Oliver, Ryan Seacrest, Craig Armstrong, Adam Sher, and Roy Ackerman, executive producers; Charles Wachter, Zoe Collins, and Jason Henry, co-executive producer; Anthony Carbone and Joe Coleman, supervising producers	ABC
2010 (62nd)	Antiques Roadshow	Marsha Bemko, executive producer; Sam Farrell, supervising producer	PBS
2010 (62nd)	Dirty Jobs	Craig Piligian, Eddie Barbini, and Mike Rowe, executive producers; Tim Pastore, executive producer for Discovery; Scott Popjes and Dave Barsky, supervising producers; Leigh Purinton, producer	Discovery
2010 (62nd)	Kathy Griffin: My Life on the D-List	Michael Levitt, Kathy Griffin, Bryan Scott, Lisa Tucker, Cori Abraham, Andrew Cohen and Jenn Levy, executive producers; Amber Mazzola, co-executive producer; Kelly Welsh, supervising producer; Blake Webster, producer	Bravo
2010 (62nd)	MythBusters	John Luscombe and Dan Tapster, executive producers; Tracy Rudolph and Steve Christiansen, supervising producers; Alice Dallow and Wendy Woll, producers	Discovery
2010 (62nd)	Undercover Boss	Eli Holzman, Stephen Lambert, Shauna Minoprio, and Stef Wagstaffe, executive producers; Alex Weresow, supervising producer	CBS
2011 (63rd)
2011 (63rd)	Deadliest Catch	Thom Beers and Jeff Conroy, executive producers; Paul Gasek and Tracy Rudolph, executive producers for Discovery; Matt Renner, co-executive producer; Sheila McCormack, supervising producer; Ethan Prochnik, series producer; Steven Robillard, senior producer; Todd Stanley, producer	Discovery
2011 (63rd)	Antiques Roadshow	Marsha Bemko, executive producer; Sam Farrell, supervising producer	PBS
2011 (63rd)	Hoarders	Matt Chan, Dave Severson, and Jodi Flynn, executive producers; Robert Sharenow and Andrew Berg, executive producers for A&E; George Butts and Pat Barnes, series producers	A&E
2011 (63rd)	Kathy Griffin: My Life on the D-List	Bryan Scott, Lisa M. Tucker, Kathy Griffin, Danny Salles, Cori Abraham, Andrew Cohen, and Jenn Levy, executive producers	Bravo
2011 (63rd)	MythBusters	Jamie Hyneman, Adam Savage, Dan Tapster, and John Luscombe, executive producers; Tracy Rudolph, executive producer for Discovery; Alice Dallow and Lauren Williams, producers	Discovery
2011 (63rd)	Undercover Boss	Eli Holzman, Stephen Lambert, and Chris Carlson, executive producers; Susan Hoenig and Sandi Johnson, co-executive producers; Allison Schermerhorn, Erica Hanson, Scott Cooper, Allison Chase Coleman, and Lety Quintanar, supervising producers	CBS
2012 (64th)
2012 (64th)	Undercover Boss	Eli Holzman, Stephen Lambert, and Chris Carlson, executive producers; Scott Cooper, and Sandi Johnson, co-executive producers; Rachelle Mendez, Lety Quintanar, and Rebekah Fry, supervising producers	CBS
2012 (64th)	Antiques Roadshow	Marsha Bemko, executive producer; Sam Farrell, supervising producer	PBS
2012 (64th)	Jamie Oliver's Food Revolution	Ryan Seacrest, Jamie Oliver, Craig Armstrong, Adam Sher, and Roy Ackerman, executive producers; Charles Wachter, Zoe Collins, and Jason Henry, co-executive producers; Robert Norris, producer	ABC
2012 (64th)	MythBusters	Jamie Hyneman, Adam Savage, Dan Tapster, Tracy Rudolph, and John Luscombe, executive producers; Alice Dallow and Lauren Williams, producers	Discovery
2012 (64th)	Shark Tank	Mark Burnett, Clay Newbill, and Phil Gurin, executive producers; Yun Lingner, Brien Meagher, David Eilenberg, and Jim Roush, co-executive producers; Rhett Bachner and Bill Gaudsmith, supervising producers; Becky Blitz, senior producer	ABC
2012 (64th)	Who Do You Think You Are?	Alex Graham, Jennifer O'Connell, Lisa Kudrow, Dan Bucatinsky, and Al Edgington, executive producers; Lisa Bohacek, Kate Richter Green, supervising producers; Chuck LaBella, producer	NBC
2013 (65th)
2013 (65th)	Undercover Boss	Eli Holzman, Stephen Lambert, and Chris Carlson, executive producers; Scott Cooper, and Sandi Johnson, co-executive producers; Rachelle Mendez, Lety Quintanar, and Rebekah Fry, supervising producers	CBS
2013 (65th)	Antiques Roadshow	Marsha Bemko, executive producer; Sam Farrell, supervising producer	PBS
2013 (65th)	Deadliest Catch	Thom Beers, Jeff Conroy, and David Pritikin, executive producers; John Gray, and Sheila McCormack, co-executive producers; Decker Watson and Sean Dash, series producers	Discovery
2013 (65th)	Diners, Drive-Ins and Dives	Frank Matson, Kat Higgins, and Tim McOsker, executive producers	Food
2013 (65th)	MythBusters	Jamie Hyneman, Adam Savage, Dan Tapster, John Luscombe, and Cameo Wallace, executive producers; Lauren Williams and Steve Christiansen, senior producers; Dennis Kwon, Linda Wolkovitch, and Brian Dean, producers	Discovery
2013 (65th)	Shark Tank	Mark Burnett, Clay Newbill, Phil Gurin, executive producers; Yun Lingner, Max Swedlow, Jim Roush, and Carl Hansen, co-executive producers; Bill Gaudsmith, and Joni Day, supervising producers; Becky Blitz, senior producer	ABC

Outstanding Unstructured Reality Program

Year	Program	Producers	Network
2014 (66th)
2014 (66th)	Deadliest Catch	Thom Beers, Jeff Conroy, John Gray and David Pritikin, executive producers; Decker Watson, co-executive producer; Johnny Beechler and Geoff Miller, supervising producers	Discovery
2014 (66th)	Alaska: The Last Frontier	Daniel Soiseth, Michael Masland, Grant Kahler and Cameo Wallace, executive producers; Brian Mandle, supervising producer	Discovery
2014 (66th)	Flipping Out	Tom Rogan, Lauren Lexton, Andrew Hoegl and Jeff Lewis, executive producers; Nick Capodice and Audrey Olsen, co-executive producers; Shannon Callaghan, senior producer	Bravo
2014 (66th)	Million Dollar Listing New York	Fenton Bailey, Randy Barbato, Tom Campbell, Danielle King and Megan Estrada, executive producers	Bravo
2014 (66th)	Wahlburgers	Mark Wahlberg, Donnie Wahlberg, Stephen Levinson, Rasha Drachkovitch, Jym Buss, Lily Neumeyer and Devon Graham, executive producers; David Hale and Brian Spoor, co-executive producers; Brittany A. Little, supervising producer	A&E
2014 (66th)	Wild Things with Dominic Monaghan	Dominic Monaghan, David Brady, Philip Clarke and Kate Harrison, executive producers; Marianne Kushmaniuk, series producer; Richard Life, producer	BBC America
2015 (67th)
2015 (67th)	Deadliest Catch	Thom Beers, Jeff Conroy, John Gray, David Pritikin and Joseph Boyle, executive producers; Decker Watson, co-executive producer; Johnny Beechler and Geoff Miller, supervising producers	Discovery
2015 (67th)	Alaska: The Last Frontier	Daniel Soiseth, Michael Masland and Cameo Wallace, executive producers; Christopher Meindl, co-executive producer; Brigham Cottam and Vincent Ueber, supervising producers	Discovery
2015 (67th)	Intervention	Gary R. Benz, Michael Branton, Jeffrey L. Weaver, Brad Holcman and Laurie Sharpe, executive producers; Peter Field, co-executive producer; P.J. Davenport, supervising producer; Karen Pinto, producer	A&E
2015 (67th)	Million Dollar Listing New York	Fenton Bailey, Randy Barbato, Tom Campbell, Danielle King and Megan Estrada, executive producers	Bravo
2015 (67th)	Naked and Afraid	David Garfinkle, Jay Renfroe, Stephen Rankin, Denise Contis and Joseph Boyle, executive producers; Robert Michael Kelly and Mathilde Bittner, co-executive producers; Richard Albrecht and David Kirkwood, supervising producers	Discovery
2015 (67th)	Wahlburgers	Mark Wahlberg, Donnie Wahlberg, Stephen Levinson, Rasha Drachkovitch, Archie Gips, David Hale, Lily Neumeyer and Devon Graham, executive producers; Brian Spoor and Trevor Baierl, co-executive producers; Brittany A. Little, supervising producer	A&E
2016 (68th)
2016 (68th)	Born This Way (Season 1)	Jonathan Murray, Gil Goldschein, Laura Korkoian, Barry Hennessey, Elaine Frontain Bryant, Shelly Tatro and Drew Tappon, executive producers; Rowan Wheeler, supervising producer; Sasha Alpert and Rachel Speiser Schwartz, producers	A&E
2016 (68th)	Deadliest Catch	Thom Beers, Jeff Conroy, John Gray, Philip David Segal, Sarah Whalen, Joseph Boyle and Decker Watson, executive producers; Geoff Miller, Arom Starr-Paul and Josh Earl, supervising producers	Discovery
2016 (68th)	Gaycation	Elliot Page, (Note: Credited as Ellen Page) Nomi Ernst Leidner, Brendan Fitzgerald, Patrick Moses, Shane Smith, Eddy Moretti and Spike Jonze, executive producers; William Fairma, co-executive producer; Niharika Desai, supervising producer	Viceland
2016 (68th)	Intervention	Gary R. Benz, Michael Branton, Tom Greenhut, Jeffrey L. Weaver, Brad Holcman and Laurie Sharpe, executive producers; Peter Field and P.J. Davenport, co-executive producers; Carl Swanson and Karen Pinto, supervising producers	A&E
2016 (68th)	Project Greenlight	Ben Affleck, Matt Damon, Jane Lipsitz, Dan Cutforth, TJ Barrack, Perrin Chiles, Marc Joubert, Marshall Lewy, Alexandra Lipsitz and Gaylen Gawlowski, executive producers	HBO
2016 (68th)	United Shades of America	W. Kamau Bell, Jimmy Fox, Layla Smith, Stephen Lambert, Eli Holzman and Star Price, executive producers	CNN
2017 (69th)
2017 (69th)	United Shades of America with W. Kamau Bell	W. Kamau Bell, Jimmy Fox, Gregory J. Lipstone, Layla Smith, Donny Jackson, Amy Entelis and Lizzie Fox, executive producers; Justin Yungfleisch and Steven Dickert, co-executive producers; David E.J. Berger, supervising producer	CNN
2017 (69th)	Born This Way (Seasons 2-3)	Gil Goldschein, Jonathan Murray, Laura Korkoian, Elaine Frontain Bryant, Shelly Tatro and Drew Tappon, executive producers; Kasey Barrett, co-executive producer; Trifari White and Millie Taggart-Ratcliffe, supervising producers; Jarrod Burt and Jacob Lane, producers	A&E
2017 (69th)	Deadliest Catch	Thom Beers, Philip David Segal, Sarah Whalen, Joseph Boyle and Decker Watson, executive producers; Geoff Miller, Arom Starr-Paul and Josh Earl, supervising producers	Discovery
2017 (69th)	Gaycation with Ellen Page	Elliot Page, Ian Daniel, Niharika Desai, Nomi Ernst Leidner, Bernardo Loyola, Shane Smith, Eddy Moretti and Spike Jonze, executive producers	Viceland
2017 (69th)	Intervention	Gary R. Benz, Michael Branton, Tom Greenhut, Brad Holcman and Laurie Sharpe, executive producers; Peter Field and P.J. Davenport, co-executive producers; Carl Swanson and Karen Pinto, supervising producers	A&E
2017 (69th)	RuPaul's Drag Race: Untucked (Season 8)	Randy Barbato, Fenton Bailey, Tom Campbell, RuPaul Charles and Steven Corfe, executive producers; Kenneth Leslie, co-executive producer	YouTube
2018 (70th)
2018 (70th)	United Shades of America with W. Kamau Bell	W. Kamau Bell, Jimmy Fox, Gregory J. Lipstone, Layla Smith, Donny Jackson, Amy Entelis and Lizzie Fox, executive producers; Justin Yungfleisch, co-executive producer; David E.J. Berger and Geraldine Porras, supervising producers	CNN
2018 (70th)	Born This Way (Season 3)	Gil Goldschein, Jonathan Murray, Laura Korkoian, Elaine Frontain Bryant and Shelly Tatro, executive producers; Kasey Barrett and Millee Taggart-Ratcliffe, co-executive producers; Jarrod Burt, Jacob Lane and Jeane Dill, supervising producers	A&E
2018 (70th)	Deadliest Catch	Thom Beers, Philip David Segal, Sarah Whalen, Joseph Boyle, Decker Watson, Arom Starr-Paul and Ernie Avila, executive producers; Geoff Miller, co-executive producer	Discovery
2018 (70th)	Intervention	Gary R. Benz, Tom Greenhut, Brad Holcman, Shell Tatro and Elaine Frontain Bryant, executive producers; Peter Field and P.J. Davenport, co-executive producers; Carl Swanson and Karen Pinto, supervising producers; Anneli Gericke, Sami Abdou and Lauren Meyer, producers	A&E
2018 (70th)	Naked and Afraid	David Garfinkle, Jay Renfroe, Stephen Rankin, Denise Contis, Joseph Boyle, Mathilde Bittner and Michael Gara, executive producers	Discovery
2018 (70th)	RuPaul's Drag Race: Untucked (Season 9)	Randy Barbato, Fenton Bailey, Tom Campbell, RuPaul Charles, Steven Corfe, Kenneth Leslie, Pamela Post, Tim Palazzola and Sam Heng, executive producers; Thairin Smothers, senior producer	VH1
2019 (71st)
2019 (71st)	United Shades of America with W. Kamau Bell	W. Kamau Bell, Jimmy Fox, Layla Smith, Tim Pastore, Justin Yungfleisch, Amy Entelis and Lizzie Fox, executive producers; Lauren Thompson, co-executive producer; David E.J. Berger, Dwayne Kennedy and Geraldine L. Porras, supervising producers	CNN
2019 (71st)	Born This Way (Season 4)	Gil Goldschein, Jonathan Murray, Elaine Bryant, Shelly Tatro and Laura Korkoian, executive producers; Kasey Barrett and Millee Taggart-Ratcliffe, co-executive producers; William Jarrod Burt and Jacob Lane, supervising producers	A&E
2019 (71st)	Deadliest Catch	Jeff Hasler, Brian Lovett, Ernest Avila, R. Decker Watson Jr., Arom Starr-Paul, Thom Beers, Joseph Boyle and Bill Howard, executive producers; Geoff Miller, co-executive producer; Rob Butler and Will Gatlin, supervising producers; Adam Flacks, series producer	Discovery
2019 (71st)	Life Below Zero	Travis Shakespeare, Joseph Litzinger and Kevin Tao Mohs, executive producers; Nicholas Bunker and Scott A. Sandman, supervising producers; Crofton Diack, Daniel Espy, Chris Multop, Rob Pollard and Brad Carper, producers	Nat Geo
2019 (71st)	RuPaul's Drag Race: Untucked (Season 10)	Pamela Post, Tim Palazzola, Randy Barbato, Fenton Bailey, Tom Campbell, RuPaul Charles, San Heng, Steven Corfe and Mandy Salangsang, executive producers; Kenneth Leslie, co-executive producer; Thairin Smothers, senior producer; Jen Passovoy, producer	VH1
2019 (71st)	Somebody Feed Phil (Season 2)	Rich Rosenthal, John Bedolis, Phil Rosenthal, Christopher Collins, Lydia Tenaglia, Joe Caterini and Shawn Cuddy, executive producers	Netflix

=== 2020s ===
Year	Program	Producers	Network
2020 (72nd)
2020 (72nd)	Cheer (Season 1)	Greg Whiteley, Andrew Fried, Dane Lillegard, Jasper Thomlinson and Bert Hamelinck, executive producers; Adam Leibowitz, supervising producer; Arielle Kilker and Chelsea Yarnell, producers	Netflix
2020 (72nd)	Amy Schumer Learns to Cook: Lunch Break and Pasta Night	Amy Schumer, Chris Fischer, Dan Cesareo, Lucilla D'Agostino, Jordana Starr and Faith Gaskins, executive producers; Lisa Koehler, co-executive producer	Food Network
2020 (72nd)	Kevin Hart: Don't F**k This Up	Kevin Hart, Dave Becky, Angus Wall, Russell Heldt, Casey Kriley and Alexandra Marks, executive producers; Rich Eckersley, co-executive producer; Allison Klein, supervising producer; Kent Kubena, Terry Leonard and Jennifer Sofio Hall, producers	Netflix
2020 (72nd)	RuPaul's Drag Race: Untucked (Season 11)	Tim Palazzola, Randy Barbato, Fenton Bailey, Tom Campbell, RuPaul Charles, Steven Corfe, Camilo Valdes and Mandy Salangsang, executive producers; Kenneth Leslie, co-executive producer; Thairin Smothers, senior producer; Jen Passovoy, producer	VH1
2020 (72nd)	We're Here	Stephen Warren, Johnnie Ingram, Eli Holzman, Aaron Saidman and Peter LoGreco, executive producers; Erin Haglund and Sabrina Mar, co-executive producers	HBO
2021 (73rd)
2021 (73rd)	RuPaul's Drag Race: Untucked (Season 12)	Fenton Bailey, Randy Barbato, Tom Campbell, RuPaul Charles, San Heng, Mandy Salangsang, Steven Corfe and Tim Palazzola, executive producers; Kenneth Leslie, co-executive producer; Thairin Smothers, senior producer; Jen Passovoy, supervising producer	VH1
2021 (73rd)	Becoming	LeBron James, Maverick Carter, Jamal Henderson, Philip Byron, Joe Weinstock, Will Nothacker, Jordana Hochman, Rebecca Bruno, Connor Schell, Bill Simmons, Libby Geist, Erin Leyden and Gentry Kirby, executive producers; Dahlia Damaghi, co-executive producer	Disney+
2021 (73rd)	Below Deck (Season 4)	Courtland Cox, Lauren Simms and Mark Cronin, executive producers; Cristina Lopez, Tania Hamidi and Rebecca Taylor Henning, co-executive producers; Jessica O'Byrne, Ryan Veerkamp, Jackie Robbins and Steve Hernandez, supervising producers; Frank Crane, senior producer	Bravo
2021 (73rd)	Indian Matchmaking (Season 1)	Eli Holzman, Aaron Saidman, J.C. Begley and Smriti Mundhra, executive producers; Hoo In Kim, supervising producer	Netflix
2021 (73rd)	Selling Sunset (Season 3)	Adam DiVello, Kristofer Lindquist and Kimberly Goodman, executive producers; Skyler Wakil and Sundee Manusakis, co-executive producers	Netflix
2022 (74th)
2022 (74th)	Love on the Spectrum U.S. (Season 1)	Cian O'Clery and Karina Holden, executive producers; Stephanie Haber, supervising producer	Netflix
2022 (74th)	Below Deck Mediterranean (Season 6)	Courtland Cox, Nadine Rajabi, Mark Cronin, Christian Sarabia, Wes Denton and Brittany Nabors, executive producers; Shane Maroufkhani and Tania Hamidi, co-executive producers; Ryan Braun, supervising producer	Bravo
2022 (74th)	Cheer (Season 2)	Greg Whiteley, Andrew Fried and Dane Lillegard, executive producers; Adam Leibowitz, supervising producer; Mark Cummins, supervising story producer; Chelsea Yarnell, producer	Netflix
2022 (74th)	RuPaul's Drag Race: Untucked (Season 13)	RuPaul Charles, Fenton Bailey, Randy Barbato, Tom Campbell, Kenneth Leslie, Mandy Salangsang, Steven Corfe, Edward Paige and Tim Palazzola, executive producers; Thairin Smothers, co-executive producer; Jeremy McGovern and Jen Passovoy, supervising producers	VH1
2022 (74th)	Selling Sunset (Season 4)	Adam DiVello, Kristofer Lindquist and Sundee Manusakis, executive producers; Suzy Ratner and Skyler Wakil, co-executive producers; Megan Roger and Erin Gaughan, supervising producers	Netflix
2023 (75th)
2023 (75th)	Welcome to Wrexham (Season 1)	John Henion, Andrew Fried, Sarina Roma, Dane Lillegard, Nicholas Frenkel, George Dewey, Rob McElhenney and Ryan Reynolds, executive producers; Alan Bloom and Lana Barkin, co-executive producers; Miloš Balać, supervising producer; Jeff Luini, producer	FX
2023 (75th)	Indian Matchmaking (Seasons 2-3)	Aaron Saidman, Eli Holzman, J.C. Begley and Smriti Mundhra, executive producers; Hoo In Kim, co-executive producer; Mansi Sharma and Pavani Srinivasan, supervising producers	Netflix
2023 (75th)	RuPaul's Drag Race: Untucked (Season 14)	RuPaul Charles, Randy Barbato, Fenton Bailey, Tom Campbell, Kenneth Leslie, Mandy Salangsang, Steven Corfe and Tim Palazzola, executive producers; Adam Bronstein and Thairin Smothers, co-executive producers; Jeremy McGovern and Jen Passovoy, supervising producers	MTV
2023 (75th)	Selling Sunset (Season 5)	Adam DiVello, Kristofer Lindquist, Sundee Manusakis, Suzy Ratner, Skyler Wakil and Jason Oppenheim, executive producers; Megan Roger, co-executive producer	Netflix
2023 (75th)	Vanderpump Rules (Season 10)	Alex Baskin, Joe Kingsley, Jen McClure-Metz, Jeremiah Smith, Natalie Neurauter and Lisa Vanderpump, executive producers; James Markham and Lauren Nathan, co-executive producers; Sandra Bansil, supervising producer	Bravo
2024 (76th)
2024 (76th)	Welcome to Wrexham (Seasons 2-3)	Josh Drisko, Bryan Rowland, Jeff Luini, Alan Bloom, Andrew Fried, Sarina Roma, Dane Lillegard, Nicholas Frenkel, George Dewey, Rob McElhenney, Ryan Reynolds and Humphrey Ker, executive producers; Miloš Balać, co-executive producer; Patrick McGarvey, supervising producer; Aaron Lovell, Shannon Owen and Liz Spano, producers	FX
2024 (76th)	Below Deck Down Under (Season 2)	Nadine Rajabi, Cristina Lopez, Jill Goslicky, Mark Cronin, Tania Hamidi, Christian Sarabia and Zachary Klein, executive producers; Malia McInnes, Steve Hernandez, Rudy Castellon and Cameron Teisher, co-executive producers; Tyler Furstman, Mary Ronau and Gina Florio Sous, supervising producers	Bravo
2024 (76th)	Love on the Spectrum U.S. (Season 2)	Cian O'Clery and Karina Holden, executive producers; Marina Nieto Ritger, supervising producer	Netflix
2024 (76th)	RuPaul's Drag Race: Untucked (Season 15)	Fenton Bailey, Randy Barbato, Tom Campbell, RuPaul Charles, Kenneth Leslie, Mandy Salangsang, Steven Corfe and Daniel Blau Rogge, executive producers; Adam Bronstein and Thairin Smothers, co-executive producers; Julie Ha, supervising producer; Alicia Gargaro-Magana, producer	MTV
2024 (76th)	Vanderpump Rules (Season 11)	Alex Baskin, Lisa Vanderpump, Jeremiah Smith, Natalie Neurauter, Joe Kingsley and Jen McClure-Metz, executive producers; Lauren Nathan, James Markham and Jessica Snavely, co-executive producers; Sandra Bansil, Miriam Mathis and Patrick McDonald, supervising producers; Kurt Murphy, senior producer	Bravo
2025 (77th)
2025 (77th)	Love on the Spectrum (Season 3)	Cian O'Clery and Karina Holden, executive producers; Diana Gonzales, supervising producer	Netflix
2025 (77th)	America's Sweethearts: Dallas Cowboys Cheerleaders (Season 1)	Greg Whiteley, Andrew Fried and Dane Lillegard, executive producers; Adam Leibowitz, co-executive producer; Chelsea Yarnell, producer	Netflix
2025 (77th)	RuPaul's Drag Race: Untucked (Season 16)	Fenton Bailey, Randy Barbato, Tom Campbell, RuPaul Charles, Andrea Van Metter, Mandy Salangsang, Steven Corfe and Daniel Blau Rogge, executive producers; Natalia James and Thairin Smothers, co-executive producers; Julie Ha, supervising producer; Alicia Gargaro-Magana, producer; America Ruiz, senior producer	MTV
2025 (77th)	The Secret Lives of Mormon Wives (Seasons 1-2)	Jeff Jenkins, Russell Jay-Staglik, Andrea Metz, Brandon Beck, Lisa Filipelli, Georgia Berger, Danielle Pistotnik and Elise Chung, executive producers; Melissa Bidwell and Dan Cerny, co-executive producers	Hulu
2025 (77th)	Welcome to Wrexham (Seasons 3-4)	Josh Drisko, Bryan Rowland, Jeff Luini, Andy Thomas, Andrew Fried, Sarina Roma, Dane Lillegard, Nicholas Frenkel, George Dewey, Rob McElhenney, Ryan Reynolds and Humphrey Ker, executive producers; Charlotte Hobday, Patrick McGarvey and Cody Shelton, co-executive producer; Sandy Johnston, supervising producer (UK); Aaron Lovell, Shannon Owen and Liz Spano, producers	FX
2026 (78th)
2026 (78th)	Love on the Spectrum (Season 4)	Cian O'Clery and Karina Holden, executive producers; Kelly Martin, supervising producer	Netflix
2026 (78th)	America's Sweethearts: Dallas Cowboys Cheerleaders (Season 2)	Greg Whiteley, Andrew Fried, Dane Lillegard, Adam Leibowitz, wxecutive producers; Maria Bohe and Zoe Lyrintzis, producer; Claire Onderdonk, supervising story producer	Netflix
2026 (78th)	RuPaul's Drag Race: Untucked (Season 17)	Fenton Bailey, Randy Barbato, Tom Campbell, RuPaul Charles, Andrea Van Metter, Steven Corfe, Mandy Salangsang and Daniel Blau Rogge, executive producers; Natalia James and Thairin Smothers, co-executive producers; Alicia Gargaro-Magaña, Jamala Gaither and America Ruiz, senior producers; Justin Healy, producer; Teresa Powell, line producer; Julie Ha, supervising producer	MTV
2026 (78th)	Summer House (Season 10)	Steven Weinstock, Glenda Hersh, Lauren Eskelin, Jamie Jakimo, Trish Gold, Faith Gaskins and Sean Clifford, executive producers; Brian Appel, Adam Szulewski, John Como, Lisa Koehler and Maggie Langtry, co-executive producers; Jessica Hubert, supervising producer	Bravo
2026 (78th)	Welcome to Wrexham (Seasons 4-5)	Bryan Rowland, Josh Drisko, Jeff Luini, Andy Thomas, Cody Shelton, Nick Mattingly, Andrew Fried, Sarina Roma, Dane Lillegard, Nicholas Frenkel, George Dewey, Rob Mac, Ryan Reynolds and Humphrey Ker, executive producers; Charlotte Hobday and Patrick McGarvey, co-executive producers; Shannon Owen, Michelle Gorski, Aaron Lovell and Liz Spano, producers; Sandy Johnston and Lindsay Allen-Hynd, supervising producers; John Salcido and Abby Schwarzwalder, supervising story producers; Marta Calvin Font, line producer	FX/Hulu

== Programs with multiple wins ==
3 wins

- Deadliest Catch
- Love on the Spectrum
- United Shades of America with W. Kamau Bell

2 wins

- Kathy Griffin: My Life on the D-List
- Welcome to Wrexham

== Programs with multiple nominations ==
Totals include nominations for Outstanding Documentary or Nonfiction Series and Outstanding Hosted Nonfiction Series or Special.

22 nominations

- Antiques Roadshow

13 nominations

- Deadliest Catch

10 nominations

- RuPaul's Drag Race: Untucked

6 nominations

- Intervention
- Kathy Griffin: My Life on the D-List

5 nominations

- United Shades of America

4 nominations

- Born This Way
- Love on the Spectrum
- Project Greenlight
- Welcome to Wrexham

3 nominations

- Selling Sunset

2 nominations

- Alaska: The Last Frontier
- America's Sweethearts: Dallas Cowboys Cheerleaders
- American High
- Cheer
- Gaycation with Ellen Page
- Indian Matchmaking
- Million Dollar Listing New York
- Naked and Afraid
- The Osbournes
- Trauma: Life in the E.R.
- Vanderpump Rules
- Wahlburgers

== See also ==
- Critics' Choice Television Award for Best Unstructured Reality Show
