= Primetime Emmy Award for Outstanding Structured Reality Program =

Television award

Primetime Emmy Award for Structured Reality Program
- Awarded for: Outstanding Structured Reality Program
- Country: United States
- Presented by: Academy of Television Arts & Sciences
- First award: 2014
- Currently held by: Antiques Roadshow (2026)
- Website: emmys.com

The Primetime Emmy Award for Outstanding Structured Reality Program is handed out annually at the Creative Arts Emmy Award ceremony.

In 2014, Outstanding Reality Program was separated into two categories – Outstanding Unstructured Reality Program and Outstanding Structured Reality Program. The category of "structured reality program" is defined as consisting of reality shows that "contain consistent story elements that mostly adhere to a recurring structured template".

In the following list, the first titles listed in gold are the winners; those not in gold are nominees, which are listed in alphabetical order. The years given are those in which the ceremonies took place:

== Winners and nominations ==
Outstanding Reality Program

=== 2000s ===
Year	Program	Producers	Network
2001 (54th)	American High	R. J. Cutler, executive producer/director; Brian Medavoy, Erwin More and Cheryl Stanley, executive producers; Dan Partland, supervising producer; Richard Bye, Jonathan Chinn, Nicholas Doob, Jonathan Mednick and Molly O'Brien, producers	Fox
2001 (54th)	The Awful Truth with Michael Moore	Michael Moore, host/writer/director/executive producer; Michael Donovan and Kathleen Glynn, executive producers; Dave Hamilton, co-executive producer; Tia Lessin and Charlie Siskel, supervising producers; Rob Huebel, Marc Johnson and Nick McKinney, producers	Bravo
2001 (54th)	The E! True Hollywood Story	Jeff Shore, executive producer; Robert Bentley, supervising producer; Eric Shepard, producer	E!
2001 (54th)	Taxicab Confessions	Harry Gantz and Joe Gantz, producer/directors	HBO
2001 (54th)	Trauma: Life in the E.R.	Stephen H. Schwartz and Liane Thompson, executive producers; Michael Selditch, producer	TLC
2002 (55th)	The Osbournes	Lois Clark Curren, R. Greg Johnston and Jeff Stilson, executive producers; Jonathan Taylor, supervising producer; Rod Aissa and Sharon Osbourne, producers	MTV
2002 (55th)	American High	R. J. Cutler, Brian Medavoy, Erwin More and Cheryl Stanley, executive producers; Dan Partland, supervising producer; Richard Bye, Jonathan Chinn, Nicholas Doob, Alison Ellwood, Jonathan Mednick, Molly O'Brien and Ted Skillman, producers	PBS
2002 (55th)	Frontier House	Alex Graham and Beth Hoppe, executive producers; Simon Shaw, series producer; Nicolas Brown and Maro Chermayeff, director/producer	PBS
2002 (55th)	Project Greenlight	Ben Affleck, Sean Bailey, Billy Campbell, Matt Damon, Chris Moore, Harvey Weinstein and Bob Weinstein, executive producers; Liz Bronstein, co-executive producer; Tina Gazzerro, Eli Holzman and Tony Yates, producer	HBO
2002 (55th)	Taxicab Confessions	Sheila Nevins, executive producer; Julie Anderson and Felicia Caplan, supervising producers; Harry Gantz and Joe Gantz, producer/directors	HBO
2002 (55th)	Trauma: Life in the E.R.	Stephen H. Schwartz and Liane Thompson, executive producers; Catherine McCarthy, Brian Seligson and Stacia Thompson, producers	TLC
2004 (56th)	Queer Eye for the Straight Guy	Christian Barcellos, Frances Berwick, David Collins, Amy Introcaso-Davis, David Metzler and Michael Williams, executive producers; Lynn Sadofsky, supervising producer; Jill Danton, producer; Ted Allen, Kyan Douglas, Thom Filicia, Carson Kressley and Jai Rodriguez, hosts	Bravo
2004 (56th)	Colonial House	Beth Hoppe and Leanne Klein, executive producers; Sallie Clement, series producer; Nicolas Brown, producer	PBS
2004 (56th)	Extreme Makeover: Home Edition	Tom Forman and Craig Armstrong, executive producers; Luis Barreto and Janelle Fiorito, co-executive producers; Conrad L. Ricketts, senior producer; Mike Maloy, supervising producer; Mark Rains, producer	ABC
2004 (56th)	Penn & Teller: Bullshit!	Mark Wolper and Star Price, executive producers; Penn Jillette, Teller, Michael Goudeau and Peter Adam Golden, co-executive producers; Shari Adagio, supervising producer	Showtime
2004 (56th)	Project Greenlight	Ben Affleck, Sean Bailey, Dan Cutforth, Matt Damon, Jane Lipsitz, Chris Moore, Bob Osher, Harvey Weinstein and Bob Weinstein, executive producers; Tony Yates, co-executive producer; Randy Sacks, supervising producer; Eli Holzman, producer	HBO
2005 (57th)	Extreme Makeover: Home Edition	Tom Forman, executive producer; Denise Cramsey, co-executive producer; Conrad L. Ricketts, senior producer; Mike Maloy, supervising producer; Andrew Lipson, Diane Korman and Emily Sinclair, producers; Ty Pennington, host	ABC
2005 (57th)	Antiques Roadshow	Marsha Bemko, executive producer; Robert Marshall, series producer; Mark L. Walberg, host	PBS
2005 (57th)	Penn & Teller: Bullshit!	Mark Wolper and Star Price, executive producers; Penn Jillette, Teller, Tim Rogan, Michael Goudeau, Peter Adam Golden and Ken Krasher Lewis, co-executive producers; Jon Hotchkiss and Shari Adagio, supervising producers; Patti Duce and Joshua E. Kessler, senior producers; Renee Y. Henson, Randall Kirk, June Molgaard, Tammie Smalls and Aaron Yampolski, series producers	Showtime
2005 (57th)	Project Greenlight	Ben Affleck, Sean Bailey, Dan Cutforth, Matt Damon, Jane Lipsitz, Chris Moore, Bob Osher, Harvey Weinstein and Bob Weinstein, executive producers; Frances Berwick, Andrew Cohen and David Serwatka, executive producer for Bravo; Rich Buhrman, co-executive producer; Casey Kriley, senior producer; Gayle Gawlowski and Kevin Morra, supervising producers; Jennifer Berman, Eli Holzman, Marc Joubert, Alexandra Lipsitz, Barbara Schneeweiss and Larry Tanz, producers	Bravo
2005 (57th)	Queer Eye for the Straight Guy	Christian Barcellos, Frances Berwick, Andrew Cohen, David Collins, Amy Introcaso-Davis, David Metzler and Michael Williams, executive producers; Linda Lea, co-executive producer; Lynn Sadofsky, supervising producer; Ted Allen, Kyan Douglas, Thom Filicia, Carson Kressley and Jai Rodriguez, hosts	Bravo
2006 (58th)	Extreme Makeover: Home Edition	Tom Forman, executive producer; Denise Cramsey, Conrad L. Ricketts and Mike Maloy, co-executive producers; Andrew Lipson, Matt Fisher, Courtney MacGregor and Charisse Simonian, producers; Ty Pennington, host	ABC
2006 (58th)	Antiques Roadshow	Marsha Bemko, executive producer; Mark L. Walberg, host	PBS
2006 (58th)	The Dog Whisperer	Jim Milio, Melissa Jo Peltier and Mark Hufnail, executive producers; SueAnn Fincke, series producer; Colette Beaudry, supervising producer; Sheila Possner Emery and Kay Bachman Sumner, producers; Cesar Millan, host	Nat Geo
2006 (58th)	Kathy Griffin: My Life on the D-List	Marcia Mule, Bryan Scott, Lisa M. Tucker, Kathy Griffin, Frances Berwick, Amy Introcaso-Davis and Rachel Smith, executive producers; Beth Wichterich, supervising producer; Matthew Lahey, producer	Bravo
2006 (58th)	Penn & Teller: Bullshit!	Mark Wolper and Star Price, executive producers; Penn Jillette, Teller, Tim Rogan, Michael Goudeau and Jon Hotchkiss, co-executive producers	Showtime
2007 (59th)	Kathy Griffin: My Life on the D-List	Marcia Mule, Bryan Scott, Lisa M. Tucker, Kathy Griffin, Cori Abraham, Frances Berwick and Amy Introcaso-Davis, executive producers; Lenid Rolov, Beth Wichterich and Kelly Luegenbiehl, supervising producers	Bravo
2007 (59th)	Antiques Roadshow	Marsha Bemko, executive producer; Sam Farrell, supervising producer; Mark L. Walberg, host	PBS
2007 (59th)	Dog Whisperer with Cesar Milan	Jim Milio, Melissa Jo Peltier and Mark Hufnail, executive producers; SueAnn Fincke, series producer; Char Serwa, supervising producer; Sheila Possner Emery and Kay Bachman Sumner, producers; Cesar Millan, host	Nat Geo
2007 (59th)	Extreme Makeover: Home Edition	Denise Cramsey, executive producer; Conrad L. Ricketts and Dan Morando, co-executive producers; Max Swedlow, supervising producer; Diane Korman, senior producer; John "J.P." Gilbert, Kathryn Vaughan, Jenifer Faison, Patrick Higgins, Andrew Lipson, Matt Fisher and Herb Ankrom, producers; Robert Day, produced by; Ty Pennington, host	ABC
2007 (59th)	Penn & Teller: Bullshit!	Mark Wolper, Star Price, Penn Jillette and Teller, executive producers; Tim Rogan, Peter Adam Golden, Ken Krasher Lewis, Michael Goudeau, Jon Hotchkiss and Steven Uhlenberg, co-executive producers; Patti Duce, Joshua Kessler and Shari Adagio, supervising producers	Showtime
2008 (60th)	Kathy Griffin: My Life on the D-List	Marcia Mule, Bryan Scott, Lisa M. Tucker, Kathy Griffin, Cori Abraham, Frances Berwick, Amy Introcaso-Davis and Christopher Carlson, executive producers; Amy Kohn, supervising producer	Bravo
2008 (60th)	Antiques Roadshow	Marsha Bemko, executive producer; Sam Farrell, supervising producer	PBS
2008 (60th)	Dirty Jobs	Craig Piligian, Eddie Barbini and Mary Donahue, executive producers; Eddie Rohwedder, supervising producer; Mike Rowe, Dave Barsky, Leigh Purinton, Kenitra Ford and Heath Banks, producers	Discovery
2008 (60th)	Extreme Makeover: Home Edition	Denise Cramsey and Conrad L. Ricketts, executive producers; Dan Morando and Brady Connell, co-executive producers; Max Swedlow, supervising producer; Diane Korman, senior producer; Herb Ankrom and Matt Fisher, producers; Jeanne Kazumi Petrone, produced by	ABC
2008 (60th)	Intervention	Gary R. Benz, Michael Branton, Bryn Freedman, Sam Mettler and Dan Partland, executive producers; Robert Sharenow and Colleen Conway, executive producers for A&E; Karen Pinto and Jeff Grogan, supervising producers	A&E
2009 (61st)	Intervention	Gary R. Benz, Michael Branton, Sam Mettler, Dan Partland, Robert Sharenow and Colleen Conway, executive producers; Jeff Grogan, supervising producer; Trisha Kirk Redding and Sarah Skibitzke, producers; Kurt Schemper, produced by	A&E
2009 (61st)	Antiques Roadshow	Marsha Bemko, executive producer; Sam Farrell, supervising producer	PBS
2009 (61st)	Dirty Jobs	Craig Piligian, Eddie Barbini, Mike Rowe and Gena McCarthy, executive producers; Eddie Rohwedder and Scott Popjes, supervising producers; Dave Barsky, producer	Discovery
2009 (61st)	Dog Whisperer	Jim Milio, Melissa Jo Peltier and Mark Hufnail, executive producers; SueAnn Fincke, series producer; Sheila Possner Emery and Kay Bachman Sumner, producers	Nat Geo
2009 (61st)	Kathy Griffin: My Life on the D-List	Marcia Mule, Bryan Scott, Lisa M. Tucker, Kathy Griffin, Cori Abraham, Andy Cohen and Jenn Levy, executive producers; Amy Kohn, co-executive producer	Bravo
2009 (61st)	MythBusters	Mary Donahue, senior executive producer; John Luscombe and Dan Tapster, executive producers; Rob Hammersley, co-executive producer; Tracy Rudolph, supervising producer; Alice Dallow and Tabitha Lentle, producers	Discovery

=== 2010s ===
Year	Program	Producers	Network
2010 (62nd)
2010 (62nd)	Jamie Oliver's Food Revolution	Jamie Oliver, Ryan Seacrest, Craig Armstrong, Adam Sher, and Roy Ackerman, executive producers; Charles Wachter, Zoe Collins, and Jason Henry, co-executive producer; Anthony Carbone and Joe Coleman, supervising producers	ABC
2010 (62nd)	Antiques Roadshow	Marsha Bemko, executive producer; Sam Farrell, supervising producer	PBS
2010 (62nd)	Dirty Jobs	Craig Piligian, Eddie Barbini, and Mike Rowe, executive producers; Tim Pastore, executive producer for Discovery; Scott Popjes and Dave Barsky, supervising producers; Leigh Purinton, producer	Discovery
2010 (62nd)	Kathy Griffin: My Life on the D-List	Michael Levitt, Kathy Griffin, Bryan Scott, Lisa Tucker, Cori Abraham, Andrew Cohen and Jenn Levy, executive producers; Amber Mazzola, co-executive producer; Kelly Welsh, supervising producer; Blake Webster, producer	Bravo
2010 (62nd)	MythBusters	John Luscombe and Dan Tapster, executive producers; Tracy Rudolph and Steve Christiansen, supervising producers; Alice Dallow and Wendy Woll, producers	Discovery
2010 (62nd)	Undercover Boss (Season 1)	Eli Holzman, Stephen Lambert, Shauna Minoprio, and Stef Wagstaffe, executive producers; Alex Weresow, supervising producer	CBS
2011 (63rd)
2011 (63rd)	Deadliest Catch	Thom Beers and Jeff Conroy, executive producers; Paul Gasek and Tracy Rudolph, executive producers for Discovery; Matt Renner, co-executive producer; Sheila McCormack, supervising producer; Ethan Prochnik, series producer; Steven Robillard, senior producer; Todd Stanley, producer	Discovery
2011 (63rd)	Antiques Roadshow	Marsha Bemko, executive producer; Sam Farrell, supervising producer	PBS
2011 (63rd)	Hoarders	Matt Chan, Dave Severson, and Jodi Flynn, executive producers; Robert Sharenow and Andrew Berg, executive producers for A&E; George Butts and Pat Barnes, series producers	A&E
2011 (63rd)	Kathy Griffin: My Life on the D-List	Bryan Scott, Lisa M. Tucker, Kathy Griffin, Danny Salles, Cori Abraham, Andrew Cohen, and Jenn Levy, executive producers	Bravo
2011 (63rd)	MythBusters	Jamie Hyneman, Adam Savage, Dan Tapster, and John Luscombe, executive producers; Tracy Rudolph, executive producer for Discovery; Alice Dallow and Lauren Williams, producers	Discovery
2011 (63rd)	Undercover Boss (Season 2)	Eli Holzman, Stephen Lambert, and Chris Carlson, executive producers; Susan Hoenig and Sandi Johnson, co-executive producers; Allison Schermerhorn, Erica Hanson, Scott Cooper, Allison Chase Coleman, and Lety Quintanar, supervising producers	CBS
2012 (64th)
2012 (64th)	Undercover Boss (Season 3)	Eli Holzman, Stephen Lambert, and Chris Carlson, executive producers; Scott Cooper, and Sandi Johnson, co-executive producers; Rachelle Mendez, Lety Quintanar, and Rebekah Fry, supervising producers	CBS
2012 (64th)	Antiques Roadshow	Marsha Bemko, executive producer; Sam Farrell, supervising producer	PBS
2012 (64th)	Jamie Oliver's Food Revolution	Ryan Seacrest, Jamie Oliver, Craig Armstrong, Adam Sher, and Roy Ackerman, executive producers; Charles Wachter, Zoe Collins, and Jason Henry, co-executive producers; Robert Norris, producer	ABC
2012 (64th)	MythBusters	Jamie Hyneman, Adam Savage, Dan Tapster, Tracy Rudolph, and John Luscombe, executive producers; Alice Dallow and Lauren Williams, producers	Discovery
2012 (64th)	Shark Tank (Season 3)	Mark Burnett, Clay Newbill, and Phil Gurin, executive producers; Yun Lingner, Brien Meagher, David Eilenberg, and Jim Roush, co-executive producers; Rhett Bachner and Bill Gaudsmith, supervising producers; Becky Blitz, senior producer	ABC
2012 (64th)	Who Do You Think You Are?	Alex Graham, Jennifer O'Connell, Lisa Kudrow, Dan Bucatinsky, and Al Edgington, executive producers; Lisa Bohacek, Kate Richter Green, supervising producers; Chuck LaBella, producer	NBC
2013 (65th)
2013 (65th)	Undercover Boss (Season 4)	Eli Holzman, Stephen Lambert, and Chris Carlson, executive producers; Scott Cooper, and Sandi Johnson, co-executive producers; Rachelle Mendez, Lety Quintanar, and Rebekah Fry, supervising producers	CBS
2013 (65th)	Antiques Roadshow	Marsha Bemko, executive producer; Sam Farrell, supervising producer	PBS
2013 (65th)	Deadliest Catch	Thom Beers, Jeff Conroy, and David Pritikin, executive producers; John Gray, and Sheila McCormack, co-executive producers; Decker Watson and Sean Dash, series producers	Discovery
2013 (65th)	Diners, Drive-Ins and Dives	Frank Matson, Kat Higgins, and Tim McOsker, executive producers	Food
2013 (65th)	MythBusters	Jamie Hyneman, Adam Savage, Dan Tapster, John Luscombe, and Cameo Wallace, executive producers; Lauren Williams and Steve Christiansen, senior producers; Dennis Kwon, Linda Wolkovitch, and Brian Dean, producers	Discovery
2013 (65th)	Shark Tank (Season 4)	Mark Burnett, Clay Newbill, Phil Gurin, executive producers; Yun Lingner, Max Swedlow, Jim Roush, and Carl Hansen, co-executive producers; Bill Gaudsmith, and Joni Day, supervising producers; Becky Blitz, senior producer	ABC

Outstanding Structured Reality Program

Year	Program	Producers	Network
2014 (66th)
2014 (66th)	Shark Tank (Season 5)	Mark Burnett, Clay Newbill and Philip Gurin, executive producers; Yun Lingner, Jim Roush and Max Swedlow, co-executive producers; Bill Gaudsmith, supervising producer; Becky Blitz, senior producer; Sami Aziz, Heather Dreiling, Michael Kramer, Laura Skowlund and Kate Ryu, producers	ABC
2014 (66th)	Antiques Roadshow	Marsha Bemko, executive producer; Sam Farrell, supervising producer; Sarah Elliott, producer	PBS
2014 (66th)	Diners, Drive-Ins and Dives	Guy Fieri, Frank Matson, Kat Higgins and Tim McOsker, executive producers	Food
2014 (66th)	MythBusters	Jamie Hyneman, Adam Savage, John Luscombe, Cameo Wallace and Dan Tapster, executive producers; Lauren Gray Williams and Steve Christiansen, senior producers; Linda Wolkovitch, Eric Haven and Dennis Kwon, producers	Discovery
2014 (66th)	Undercover Boss (Season 5)	Stephen Lambert, Chris Carlson and Eli Holzman, executive producers; Scott Cooper, Abigail Shafran, Mike Cotton and Brielle Lebsack, co-executive producers; Rachelle Mendez and Margaret Burris, supervising producers	CBS
2014 (66th)	Who Do You Think You Are?	Alex Graham, Pamela Healey, Lisa Kudrow, Dan Bucatinsky, Al Edgington, Howard Lee, Amy Winter and Timothy Kuryak, executive producers; Lisa Bohacek, co-executive producer; Jim Albarano, Alexandra Orton and Heather Ross, producers	TLC
2015 (67th)
2015 (67th)	Shark Tank (Season 6)	Mark Burnett, Clay Newbill and Philip Gurin, executive producers; Yun Lingner, Jim Roush, Max Swedlow and Brandon Wallace, co-executive producers; Becky Blitz, supervising producer; Laura Skowlund, senior producer; Sami Aziz, Heather Dreiling, Michael Kramer, Kate Ryu, Dominique Worden and Ian Sambor, producers	ABC
2015 (67th)	Antiques Roadshow	Marsha Bemko, executive producer; Sam Farrell, supervising producer; Sarah Elliott, producer	PBS
2015 (67th)	Diners, Drive-Ins and Dives	Guy Fieri, Frank Matson, Kat Higgins and Tim McOsker, executive producers; Jen Darrow, supervising producer	Food
2015 (67th)	MythBusters	Jamie Hyneman, Adam Savage, John Luscombe, Cameo Wallace, Joshua C. Berkley and Dan Tapster, executive producers; Steve Christiansen, supervising producer; Yvette Solis, Eric Haven and Dennis Kwon, producers	Discovery
2015 (67th)	Property Brothers	Kim Bondi, executive producer/producer; Katherine Buck, Gerard Barry and Jessica Vander Kooij, executive producers	HGTV
2015 (67th)	Undercover Boss (Season 6)	Stephen Lambert, Chris Carlson and Eli Holzman, executive producers; Scott Cooper, Abigail Shafran and Brielle Lebsack, co-executive producers; Dallas Hitchcock, Miriam Jobrani and Daren Woolsey, supervising producers; Cody Shelton, senior producer	CBS
2016 (68th)
2016 (68th)	Shark Tank (Season 7)	Mark Burnett, Clay Newbill, Yun Lingner and Philip Gurin, executive producers; Max Swedlow and Brandon Wallace, co-executive producers; Becky Blitz, supervising producer; Sami Aziz, Heather Dreiling and Kate Ryu, senior producers; Dominique Worden, producer	ABC
2016 (68th)	Antiques Roadshow	Marsha Bemko, executive producer; Sam Farrell, supervising producer; Sarah Elliott, producer	PBS
2016 (68th)	Diners, Drive-Ins and Dives	Guy Fieri, Frank Matson, Kat Higgins and Tim McOsker, executive producers; Jen Darrow, supervising producer	Food
2016 (68th)	Lip Sync Battle	Casey Patterson, Jay Peterson, John Krasinski and Stephen Merchant, executive producers	Spike
2016 (68th)	MythBusters	Jamie Hyneman, Adam Savage, John Luscombe, Joshua C. Berkley and Dan Tapster, executive producers; Steve Christiansen, supervising producer; Yvette Solis, Eric Haven, Dennis Kwon and Jacquelyn Marker, producers	Discovery
2016 (68th)	Undercover Boss (Season 7)	Stephen Lambert, Chris Carlson and Eli Holzman, executive producers; Scott Cooper, Brielle Lebsack Cohen, Rachelle Mendez and Rebecca Hertz, co-executive producers; Brent Benedetti, Esther Dere and Marissa Thompson, supervising producers	CBS
2017 (69th)
2017 (69th)	Shark Tank (Season 8)	Mark Burnett, Clay Newbill, Yun Lingner and Philip Gurin, executive producers; Max Swedlow and Brandon Wallace, co-executive producers; Becky Blitz, supervising producer; Sami Aziz, Heather Dreiling, Michael Kramer, Shaun Polakow, Laura Roush and Kate Ryu, senior producers; Dominique Worden, producer	ABC
2017 (69th)	Antiques Roadshow	Marsha Bemko, executive producer; Sam Farrell, supervising producer; Sarah Elliott, producer	PBS
2017 (69th)	Diners, Drive-Ins and Dives	Guy Fieri, executive producer/host; Frank Matson and Tim McOsker, executive producers; Jen Darrow, supervising producer	Food
2017 (69th)	Fixer Upper	Jim Berger, Scott Feeley, Glenna Stacer Sayles and Michael Matsumoto, executive producers; Robert Zimmerman, co-executive producer; Candice Grubb, supervising producer	HGTV
2017 (69th)	Lip Sync Battle	Casey Patterson, Jay Peterson, John Krasinski, Stephen Merchant and James McKinlay, executive producers; Leah Culton Gonzalez and Pete DiObilda, co-executive producers; Genna Gintzig, supervising producer; LL Cool J and Danielle Flora, producers	Spike
2017 (69th)	Who Do You Think You Are?	Alex Graham, Pam Healey, Lisa Kudrow, Dan Bucatinsky, Stephanie Schwam, Nancy Daniels and Howard Lee, executive producers; Cameo Wallace, senior executive producer; Anna Pousho, co-executive producer; Justin Robertson and Aleta Rozanski, supervising producers	TLC
2018 (70th)
2018 (70th)	Queer Eye (Season 1)	David Collins, Michael Williams, Rob Eric, Jennifer Lane, Adam Sher, David George, David Eilenberg and Jordana Hochman, executive producers; Mark Bracero and Rachelle Mendez, co-executive producers	Netflix
2018 (70th)	Antiques Roadshow	Marsha Bemko, executive producer; Sam Farrell, supervising producer; Sarah Elliott, producer	PBS
2018 (70th)	Fixer Upper	Jim Berger, Scott Feeley, Glenna Stacer Sayles and Michael Matsumoto, executive producers; Robert Zimmerman, co-executive producer; Candice Grubb, supervising producer	HGTV
2018 (70th)	Lip Sync Battle	Casey Patterson, Jay Peterson, John Krasinski, Stephen Merchant and Todd Yasui, executive producers; Leah Culton Gonzalez, Pete DiObilda and Michael H. Miller, co-executive producers; Mariana Ferraro, supervising producer; Lindsay John, senior producer; LL Cool J and Danielle Flora, producers	Paramount
2018 (70th)	Shark Tank (Season 9)	Mark Burnett, Clay Newbill, Yun Lingner and Philip Gurin, executive producers; Max Swedlow and Brandon Wallace, co-executive producers; Becky Blitz, supervising producer; Sami Aziz, Heather Dreiling, Shaun Polakow, Laura Roush, Kate Ryu and Dominique Worden, senior producers; Alan Kirk and Christina Reynolds, producers	ABC
2018 (70th)	Who Do You Think You Are?	Pam Healey, Lisa Kudrow, Dan Bucatinsky, Stephanie Schwam, Howard Lee, Nancy Daniels and John Hein, executive producers; Anna Pousho and Aleta Rozanski, co-executive producers; Justin Robertson, supervising producer; Annie Powers, producer	TLC
2019 (71st)
2019 (71st)	Queer Eye (Seasons 2-3)	David Collins, Michael Williams, Rob Eric, Jennifer Lane, Jordana Hochman, David George, Adam Sher and David Eilenberg, executive producers; Rachelle Mendez and Mark Bracero, co-executive producers	Netflix
2019 (71st)	Antiques Roadshow	Marsha Bemko, executive producer; Sam Farrell, senior producer; Sarah K. Elliott, producer	PBS
2019 (71st)	Diners, Drive-Ins and Dives	Guy Fieri, Frank Matson, Tim McOsker and Jen Darrow, executive producers	Food
2019 (71st)	Shark Tank (Season 10)	Mark Burnett, Clay Newbill, Yun Lingner, Max Swedlow and Phil Gurin, executive producers; Brandon Wallace, co-executive producer; Becky Blitz, supervising producer; Laura Roush, Heather Dreiling, Sami Aziz and Shaun Polakow, senior producers; Alan Kirk, Christina Reynolds, Nicole Edholm and Shawn Aly, producers	ABC
2019 (71st)	Tidying Up with Marie Kondo	Gail Berman, Joe Earley, Marie Kondo, Takumi Kawahara, Hend Baghdady and Bianca Barnes-Williams, executive producers; Heather Crowe and Scott Mlodzinski, co-executive producers; Ian Samplin, supervising producer	Netflix
2019 (71st)	Who Do You Think You Are?	Pam Healey, Lisa Kudrow, Dan Bucatinsky and Stephanie Schwam, executive producers; Anna Pousho and Aleta Rozanski, co-executive producers; Justin Robertson, supervising producer; Annie Powers, producer	TLC

=== 2020s ===
Year	Program	Producers	Network
2020 (72nd)
2020 (72nd)	Queer Eye (Season 4)	David Collins, Michael Williams, Rob Eric, Jennifer Lane, Jordana Hochman, Adam Sher, David George and David Eilenberg, executive producers; Rachelle Mendez and Mark Bracero, co-executive producers	Netflix
2020 (72nd)	Antiques Roadshow	Marsha Bemko, executive producer; Sam Farrell, senior producer; Sarah K. Elliott, producer	PBS
2020 (72nd)	Love Is Blind (Season 1)	Chris Coelen, Sam Dean, Ally Simpson, Eric Detwiler and Brian Smith, executive producers; Stefanie Cohen Williams, Brent Gauches and Jeff Keirns, co-executive producers	Netflix
2020 (72nd)	Shark Tank (Season 11)	Mark Burnett, Clay Newbill, Yun Lingner, Max Swedlow, Phil Gurin, Mark Cuban, Lori Greiner, Kevin O'Leary, Barbara Corcoran, Daymond John and Robert Herjavec, executive producers; Brandon Wallace, co-executive producer; Becky Blitz and Sami Aziz, supervising producers; Heather Dreiling, senior producer	ABC
2020 (72nd)	A Very Brady Renovation	Brian Lando, Francesco Giuseppe Pace, Bob Kirsh and Dean Ollins, executive producers; Kelsey McCallister, co-executive producer; Christina Hilbig, supervising producer	HGTV
2021 (73rd)
2021 (73rd)	Queer Eye (Season 5)	David Collins, Michael Williams, Rob Eric, Jennifer Lane, Jordana Hochman, Rachelle Mendez, Mark Bracero, Adam Sher, David George and David Eilenberg, executive producers; Bernard Parham Jr., producer	Netflix
2021 (73rd)	Antiques Roadshow	Marsha Bemko, executive producer; Adam Monahan, producer; Sam Farrell and Sarah K. Elliott, senior producers	PBS
2021 (73rd)	Property Brothers: Forever Home	Drew Scott, Jonathan Silver Scott, Bree Tiffin, Josie Crimi, Jane Van Deuren, Katherine Buck and Kim Bondi, executive producers; Sarrah Sayami, series producer	HGTV
2021 (73rd)	Running Wild with Bear Grylls	Bear Grylls, Delbert Shoopman, Ben Silverman, Howard T. Owens, Rob Buchta, Drew Buckley, Chris Grant, Liz Schulze and Bengt Anderson, executive producers; Ben Simms and Mark Stelljes, co-executive producers; Isabel San Vargas, produced by	Nat Geo
2021 (73rd)	Shark Tank (Season 12)	Mark Burnett, Clay Newbill, Yun Lingner, Max Swedlow, Phil Gurin, Mark Cuban, Lori Greiner, Kevin O'Leary, Barbara Corcoran, Daymond John, Robert Herjavec and Brandon Wallace, executive producers; Becky Blitz and Sami Aziz, supervising producers; Laura Roush, senior producer	ABC
2022 (74th)
2022 (74th)	Queer Eye (Season 6)	David Collins, Michael Williams, Rob Eric, Jennifer Lane, Jordana Hochman and Mark Bracero, executive producers; Lyndsey Burr, co-executive producer; Westley Harris and Jenifer Lerman, supervising producers; Shay Caldwell and Solange Gomez, producers	Netflix
2022 (74th)	Antiques Roadshow	Marsha Bemko, executive producer; Sam Farrell, senior producer; Sarah K. Elliott, producer	PBS
2022 (74th)	Fixer Upper: Welcome Home	Chip Gaines, Joanna Gaines, Jarrett Lambo, Aric Laferriere and Cory Lyons, executive producers; Julian Londoño, co-executive producer; Samantha Day, supervising producer	Magnolia
2022 (74th)	Love Is Blind (Season 2)	Chris Coelen, Ally Simpson, Eric Detwiler, Kimberly Goodman and Jill Goslicky, executive producers; Leif Lindhjem, co-executive producer	Netflix
2022 (74th)	Shark Tank (Season 13)	Mark Burnett, Clay Newbill, Yun Lingner, Max Swedlow, Mark Cuban, Lori Greiner, Kevin O'Leary, Barbara Corcoran, Daymond John, Robert Herjavec and Brandon Wallace, executive producers; Becky Blitz, supervising producer; Shaun Polakow and Shawn Aly, senior producers	ABC
2023 (75th)
2023 (75th)	Queer Eye (Season 7)	David Collins, Michael Williams, Rob Eric, Jennifer Lane, Jordana Hochman and Mark Bracero, executive producers; Kori Kingg, co-executive producer; Jenifer Lerman, supervising producer; Bobby Berk, Karamo Brown, Tan France, Antoni Porowski and Jonathan Van Ness, producers	Netflix
2023 (75th)	Antiques Roadshow	Marsha Bemko, executive producer; Sam Farrell, senior producer; Sarah K. Elliott, producer	PBS
2023 (75th)	Diners, Drive-Ins and Dives	Guy Fieri, Frank Matson and Jen Darrow, executive producers	Food
2023 (75th)	Love Is Blind (Seasons 3-4)	Chris Coelen, Ally Simpson, Eric Detwiler, Brent Gauches, Heather Crowe and Brian Smith, executive producers; Stefanie Cohen Williams, Morgan Harris and Ewa Mularczyk, co-executive producers	Netflix
2023 (75th)	Shark Tank (Season 14)	Mark Burnett, Clay Newbill, Yun Lingner, Max Swedlow, Mark Cuban, Lori Greiner, Kevin O'Leary, Barbara Corcoran, Daymond John, Robert Herjavec and Brandon Wallace, executive producers; Becky Blitz, supervising producer; Shaun Polakow, Shawn Aly and Andrew Kimmel, senior producers	ABC
2024 (76th)
2024 (76th)	Shark Tank (Season 15)	Mark Burnett, Clay Newbill, Yun Lingner, Max Swedlow, Mark Cuban, Lori Greiner, Kevin O'Leary, Barbara Corcoran, Daymond John, Robert Herjavec and Brandon Wallace, executive producers; Becky Blitz, supervising producer; Shaun Polakow, Shawn Aly and Andrew Kimmel, senior producers	ABC
2024 (76th)	Antiques Roadshow	Marsha Bemko, executive producer; Sam Farrell, senior producer; Sarah K. Elliott, producer	PBS
2024 (76th)	Diners, Drive-Ins and Dives	Guy Fieri, Frank Matson and Jen Darrow, executive producers	Food
2024 (76th)	Love Is Blind (Seasons 5-6)	Chris Coelen, Ally Simpson, Eric Detwiler, Brent Gauches and Brian Smith, executive producers; Stefanie Cohen Williams, Morgan Harris and Ewa Mularczyk, co-executive producers; Michelle Thomas, supervising producer	Netflix
2024 (76th)	Queer Eye (Season 8)	David Collins, Michael Williams, Rob Eric, Jennifer Lane, Jordana Hochman and Mark Bracero, executive producers; Kori Kingg, co-executive producer; Jenifer Lerman, supervising producer; Bobby Berk, Karamo Brown, Tan France, Antoni Porowski and Jonathan Van Ness, producers	Netflix
2025 (77th)
2025 (77th)	Queer Eye (Season 9)	David Collins, Michael Williams, Rob Eric, Jennifer Lane, Jordana Hochman, Mark Bracero, Lyndsey Burr, Jeremiah Brent, Karamo Brown, Tan France, Antoni Porowski and Jonathan Van Ness, executive producers; Solange Gomez-Smith and Jenifer Lerman, supervising producers; Alexander Liley-Roth and Erin McKeon, producers	Netflix
2025 (77th)	Antiques Roadshow	Marsha Bemko, executive producer; Sam Farrell, senior producer; Sarah K. Elliott, producer	PBS
2025 (77th)	Diners, Drive-Ins and Dives	Guy Fieri, Frank Matson and Jen Darrow, executive producers	Food
2025 (77th)	Love Is Blind (Seasons 7-8)	Chris Coelen, Ally Simpson, Eric Detwiler, Brent Gauches and Brian Smith, executive producers; Stefanie Cohen Williams, Ewa Mularczyk and Michelle Thomas, co-executive producers	Netflix
2025 (77th)	Shark Tank (Season 16)	Clay Newbill, Yun Lingner, Max Swedlow, Mark Cuban, Lori Greiner, Kevin O'Leary, Barbara Corcoran, Daymond John, Robert Herjavec, Brandon Wallace and Barry Poznick, executive producers; Becky Blitz and Andrew Kimmel, supervising producers; Shaun Polakow, Shawn Aly, Christina Reynolds and Kelly Fazel, senior producers	ABC
2026 (78th)
2026 (78th)	Antiques Roadshow	Marsha Bemko, executive producer; Sam Farrell, senior producer; Sarah K. Elliott, producer; Jill Giles, line producer	PBS
2026 (78th)	Diners, Drive-Ins and Dives	Guy Fieri, Jen Darrow and Frank Matson, executive producers	Food
2026 (78th)	Love Is Blind (Seasons 9-10)	Chris Coelen, Ally Simpson, Eric Detwiler, Morgan Harris and Brian Smith, executive producers; Stefanie Cohen Williams, Nieshia Crawford, Ewa Mularczyk and Michelle Thomas, co-executive producers	Netflix
2026 (78th)	Queer Eye (Season 10)	David Collins, Michael Williams, Rob Eric, Jennifer Lane, Jordana Hochman, Mark Bracero, Lyndsey Burr, Jeremiah Brent, Karamo Brown, Tan France, Antoni Porowski, Jonathan Van Ness, executive producers; Erin McKeon and Miguel Valarino producers; Paul Backer, line producer	Netflix
2026 (78th)	Shark Tank (Season 17)	Clay Newbill, Yun Lingner, Max Swedlow, Lori Greiner, Kevin O'Leary, Barbara Corcoran, Daymond John, Robert Herjavec, Brandon Wallace, Barry Poznick, executive producers; Becky Blitz and Andrew Kimmel, supervising producers; Shaun Polakow, Shawn Aly, Christina Reynolds, Kelly Fazel, Jeremy Turkin, Marcy Walton and Steve Bae, senior producers; Krista Homiak, line producer; Maggie Morlath and Denise Galvão, producers	ABC

== Programs with multiple wins ==
7 wins

- Queer Eye (6 consecutive)

5 wins

- Shark Tank (4 consecutive)

2 wins

- Extreme Makeover: Home Edition
- Kathy Griffin: My Life on the D-List
- Undercover Boss

== Programs with multiple nominations ==
Totals include nominations for Outstanding Documentary or Nonfiction Series.

22 nominations

- Antiques Roadshow

15 nominations

- Shark Tank

10 nominations

- Diners, Drive-Ins and Dives

9 nominations

- Queer Eye

8 nominations

- MythBusters

7 nominations

- Undercover Boss

6 nominations

- Kathy Griffin: My Life on the D-List
- Love Is Blind

5 nominations

- Extreme Makeover: Home Edition
- Who Do You Think You Are?

3 nominations

- Lip Sync Battle

2 nominations

- Dirty Jobs
- Dog Whisperer
- Fixer Upper
- Jamie Oliver's Food Revolution
- Queer Eye for the Straight Guy
- Taxicab Confessions

== See also ==
- Critics' Choice Television Award for Best Structured Reality Show
