= Scout Productions =

Film and television production company

Scout Productions, Inc
- Company type: Film & TV Production Company
- Founded: Boston, Massachusetts, United States (1994)
- Key people: Michael Williams, Principal and Co-Owner; David Collins, Principal and Co-Owner; Rob Eric, Chief Creative Officer
- Products: Film & Television Production

Scout Productions is a film and television production company owned by Michael Williams and David Collins. David Collins created the groundbreaking television series Queer Eye for the Straight Guy, which revolutionized reality television and the Bravo Network. Queer Eye aired in 120 countries and included 19 international formats. It made its mark critically and on the cultural landscape, winning an Emmy, a PGA Award, and two GLAAD Media Awards. In January 2017, it was announced Netflix and Scout were producing a reimagining of the series with an all new Fab Five. The new show premiered in February 2018 to positive reviews and launched the Netflix foray into original unscripted series.

Other series Scout has produced include Home Made Simple on OWN, Big Ideas for a Small Planet, Sox Appeal, Sordid Lives: The Series, First Person. Films include the Oscar winning documentary The Fog of War (2003) and Transsiberian (2008).

Michael Williams and David Collins founded the company in 1994 focusing on independent features, including Never Met Picasso (1996), Home Before Dark (1997), Six Ways To Sunday (1998), Mr. Death: The Rise and Fall of Fred A. Leuchter, Jr. (1999), and Session 9 (2001). In 2003, they created their breakout hit, Queer Eye for the Straight Guy, and company principal Michael Williams won the Academy Award with Errol Morris for the 2003 documentary film The Fog of War.

== Film and television productions ==
Scout Productions has been responsible for the following television series:

- First Person (2000–2001)
- 24 With (2002)
- Face Time (2002–2003)
- Queer Eye for the Straight Guy (2003–2007)
- Knock First (2003–2005)
- Queer Eye for the Straight Girl (2005)
- How To Get The Guy (2006)
- Big Ideas for a Small Planet (2007–2008)
- Sox Appeal (2007–2008)
- Sordid Lives: The Series (2008)
- The Outdoor Room with Jamie Lurie (2008–2013)
- The Antonio Treatment (2010–2011)
- Home Made Simple (2011–2021)
- Queer Eye (2018–2026)
- Say I Do (2020)
- Equal (2020)
- I Love You, You Hate Me (2022)

Film credits:

- Never Met Picasso (1996)
- Home Before Dark (1997)
- Six Ways To Sunday (1998)
- Mr. Death: The Rise and Fall of Fred A. Leuchter, Jr. (1999)
- Session 9 (2001)
- The Fog of War (2003)
- Transsiberian (2008)

== Awards and nominations ==
- 1997 Grand Jury Award - Best Actor in a Feature Film - LA Outfest (Alexis Arquette for Never Met Picasso)
- 1997 Grand Jury Award - Best Screenwriting - LA Outfest (Stephen Kijak for Never Met Picasso)
- 1997 Golden Starfish Award - Best American Independent Film - Hamptons International Film Festival (Home Before Dark)
- 1997 Grand Special Prize Nominee - Deauville Film Festival (Six Ways To Sunday)
- 2000 Best Documentary - Dallas-Fort Worth Film Critics Association Awards (Mr. Death)
- 2000 Outstanding Directorial Achievement in Documentary Nominee - Dallas-Fort Worth Film Critics Association Awards (Mr. Death)
- 2000 Outstanding Directorial Achievement in Documentary Nominee - Directors Guild of America (Mr. Death)
- 2003 Best Documentary - National Board of Review (The Fog of War)
- 2004 Best Non-Fiction Film - Los Angeles Film Critics Association Awards (The Fog of War)
- 2004 Best Documentary - Independent Spirit Awards (The Fog of War)
- 2004 Best Documentary - Chicago Film Critics Association Awards (The Fog of War)
- 2004 Best Documentary - Academy of Motion Pictures Arts and Sciences (The Fog of War)
- 2004 People's Choice Award Nominee (Queer Eye for the Straight Guy)
- 2004 Television Producer of the Year - PGA Golden Laurel Award (Queer Eye for the Straight Guy)
- 2004 Outstanding Reality Program - Emmy Awards (Queer Eye for the Straight Guy)
- 2005 Television Producer of the Year Nominee - PGA Golden Laurel Award (Queer Eye for the Straight Guy)
- 2005 Outstanding Reality Program Nominee - Emmy Awards (Queer Eye for the Straight Guy)
- 2007 Outstanding Documentary Series - EMA Awards (Big Ideas for a Small Planet)
- 2007 Outstanding Sports Series - New England Emmy Awards (Sox Appeal)
- 2008 Outstanding Sports Series - New England Emmy Awards (Sox Appeal)

== See also ==
- Michael Williams (film producer)
- Queer Eye for the Straight Guy
