= Queer Eye for the Straight Girl =

2005 reality television series

- Genre: Reality television
- Country of origin: United States
- Original language: English
- No. of seasons: 1
- No. of episodes: 13

Production
- Executive producers: David Collins; David Metzler; Michael Williams
- Production location: Los Angeles, California
- Running time: 44–45 minutes
- Production company: Scout Productions

Original release
- Network: Bravo
- Release: January 11 – May 8, 2005

Queer Eye for the Straight Girl, which aired from January to May 2005, is a spin-off of the television show Queer Eye for the Straight Guy. As the name suggests, the program focuses on makeovers for women while following the format of the original show. While the original show is mostly set in New York City, Queer Eye for the Straight Girl is set in Los Angeles. The hosts are called "The Gal Pals" and include three gay men and a lesbian. The show was unsuccessful and ended after the first season.

== The Gal Pals ==
- Robbie Laughlin ("The Look") – specializes in fashion and beauty tips.
- Danny Teeson ("The Life") – specializes in lifestyle.
- Damon Pease ("The Locale") – specializes in interior design and furniture.
- Honey Labrador ("The Lady") – specializes in character building and expounds the three other areas.

== Episodes ==
No.	Title	Original release date
1	"Rebeka D."	January 11, 2005
2	"Nicole H."	January 12, 2005
3	"Melissa C."	January 19, 2005
4	"Tamara W."	January 26, 2005
5	"Samantha P."	February 2, 2005
6	"Laura L."	February 9, 2005
7	"Kristen M."	February 16, 2005
8	"Kim D."	March 2, 2005
9	"Luz H."	March 9, 2005
10	"Deena M."	March 16, 2005
11	"Sandi S."	March 23, 2005
12	"Lauren F."	May 8, 2005
13	"Kimberly K."	May 8, 2005

== Reception ==
People said, "Laughlin appears ticketed for the chief quipster's role, though he lacks the waspish wit of Straight Guy's Carson Kressley. Labrador is buff and sexy, and Teeson has a New Age slant that suggests he's about inner peace as well as party planning. The cast is adequate, but the show comes off as a calculated Queer Eye brand extension." The New York Times's Alessandra Stanley wrote, "What began as a carefree makeover lark turns into a Queen for a Day tear-jerker, and that is more unsettling than it is amusing."

In a positive review, The Washington Post television critic Tom Shales said, "It may not be original, but in context and under the circumstances, it's definitely good for a lump in the throat. Queer Eye for the Straight Girl, like its predecessor, makes Television Land a nicer place to hang out."
