= Michael Williams (film producer) =

American producer (born 1957)

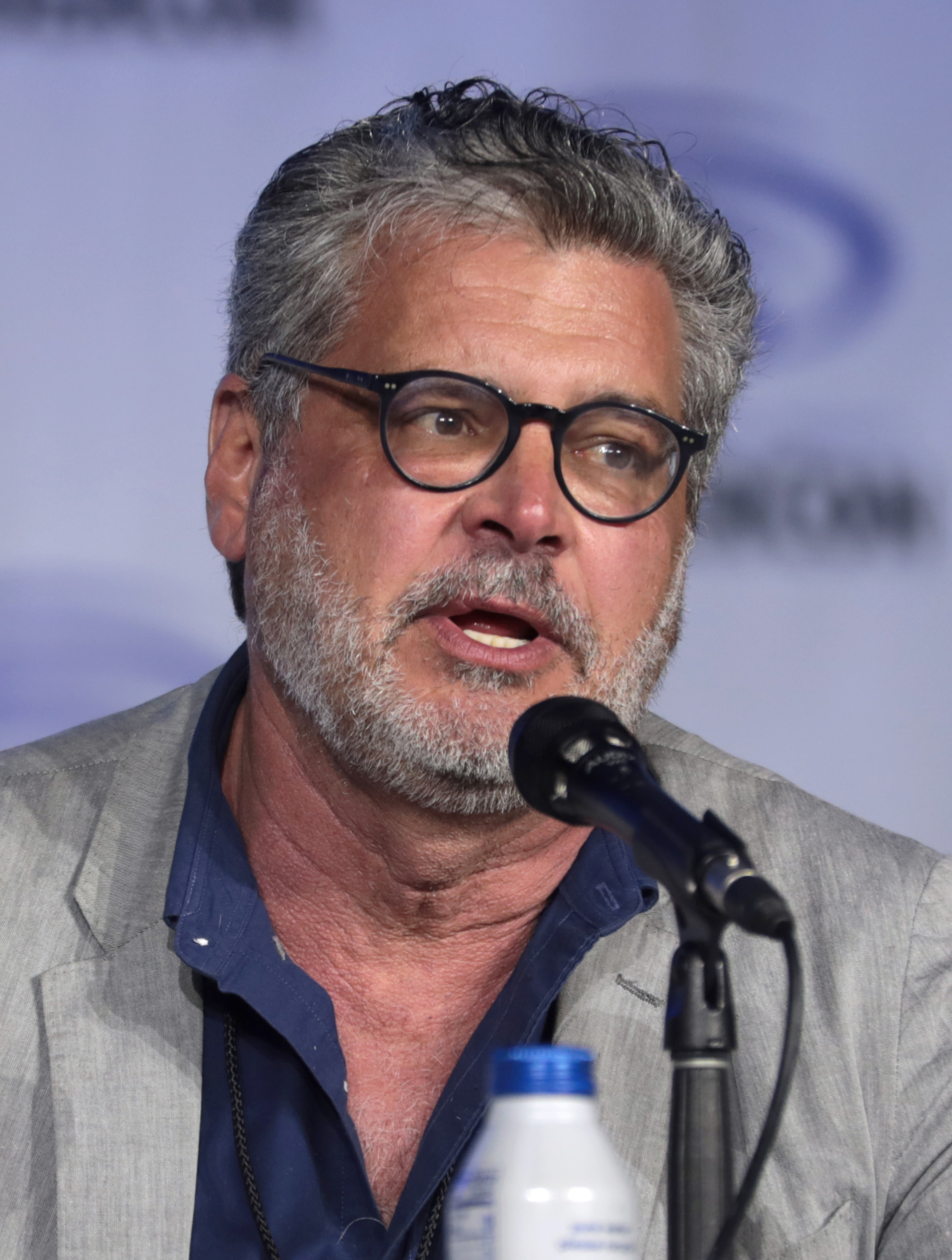
- Williams at the 2022 WonderCon
- Born: February 14, 1957 (age 69); United States
- Occupations: Film producer, television producer

Michael Williams (born February 14, 1957) is an American producer. He won an Academy Award for Best Documentary Feature for the documentary The Fog of War: Eleven Lessons from the Life of Robert S. McNamara in 2004. He also won an Emmy Award in 2004 for Queer Eye for the Straight Guy, which he created. Queer Eye was rebooted in 2018, for which Williams won seven consecutive Primetime Emmys for Outstanding Structured Reality Program. He is co-owner and principal of Scout Productions, a film and television production company based in Los Angeles, California. He graduated from the School of Communications at Boston University. In 1979, Williams began his career as a location scout for Spenser for Hire, which filmed in Boston.
