= The Fog of War =

2003 documentary film by Errol Morris

- Theatrical release poster
- Directed by: Errol Morris
- Produced by: Errol Morris; Michael Williams; Julie Ahlberg
- Starring: Robert McNamara
- Cinematography: Robert Chappell (interviews); Peter Donahue
- Music by: Philip Glass; John Kusiak
- Production companies: RadicalMedia; SenArt Films
- Distributed by: Sony Pictures Classics
- Release dates: May 21, 2003 (Cannes); December 19, 2003
- Running time: 107 minutes
- Country: United States
- Language: English
- Box office: $5 million

The Fog of War: Eleven Lessons from the Life of Robert S. McNamara is a 2003 American documentary film about the life and times of former U.S. Secretary of Defense Robert McNamara, illustrating his observations of the nature of modern warfare. It was directed by Errol Morris and features an original score by Philip Glass. The title derives from the military concept of the "fog of war", which refers to the difficulty of making decisions in the midst of conflict.

The film was screened out of competition at the 2003 Cannes Film Festival and won the Academy Award for Best Documentary Feature and the Independent Spirit Award for Best Documentary Feature of 2003. In 2019, it was selected by the Library of Congress for preservation in the United States National Film Registry for being "culturally, historically, or aesthetically significant".

== Summary ==
Composed of archival footage, recordings from the 1960s of conversations of the United States Cabinet, and new interviews with former Secretary of Defense Robert McNamara, The Fog of War depicts McNamara's life, as seen from his perspective as an eighty-five-year-old man. It is divided into eleven sections based upon "lessons" Morris derived from his interviews with McNamara, as well as the eleven lessons presented at the end of McNamara's 1995 book, In Retrospect: The Tragedy and Lessons of Vietnam (written with Brian VanDeMark).

Born in San Francisco during World War I, McNamara says his earliest memory is of American troops returning from Europe. Coming from humble origins, he graduated from University of California, Berkeley and Harvard Business School, where he went on to teach. He met his first wife, Margaret Craig, at Berkeley. During World War II, he served as an officer in the Army Air Forces under General Curtis LeMay, who was later Chief of Staff of the Air Force while McNamara was Secretary of Defense.

After the war, McNamara was one of the Whiz Kids at Ford Motor Company, of which he was briefly president before he left to become Secretary of Defense for newly elected President John F. Kennedy, a role he continued to hold, until 1968, under President Lyndon Johnson. As Secretary of Defense, McNamara was a controversial figure, and in the film he discusses, in particular, his involvement in the Cuban Missile Crisis and the escalation of the Vietnam War. At some points, McNamara speaks openly and critically about the actions of himself and others, while at others, he is somewhat defensive and withholding.

== Concept ==
In a 2004 appearance at U.C. Berkeley, director Errol Morris said the documentary had its origins in his interest in McNamara's 2001 book, Wilson's Ghost: Reducing the Risk of Conflict, Killing, and Catastrophe in the 21st Century (written with James G. Blight). Morris initially approached McNamara about an interview for an hour-long television special, but, after the interview was extended multiple times, he decided to make a feature film instead; ultimately, Morris interviewed McNamara for some twenty hours. At the event at U.C. Berkeley, McNamara disagreed with the interpretations of the lessons that Morris used in The Fog of War, and he later provided ten new lessons for a special feature on the DVD release of the film. When asked to apply the lessons from In Retrospect to the U.S. invasion of Iraq, McNamara refused, arguing that ex-secretaries of defense must not comment upon the policies of the incumbent defense secretary, though he did suggest other people could apply the lessons to the war in Iraq, as they are about war in general, not a specific war.

For his interviews with McNamara, Morris used a special device he had developed called the "Interrotron", which projects images of interviewer and interviewee on two-way mirrors in front of their respective cameras so each appears to be talking directly to the other. The use of this device is intended to approximate an actual interaction between the two, while encouraging the subject to make direct eye contact with the camera and, therefore, the audience.

== Reception ==
Reviews for the film were very positive. On review aggregator website Rotten Tomatoes, it has an approval rating of 96%, based on 142 reviews, and an average rating of 8.32/10; the website's critical consensus states: "The Fog of War draws on decades of bitter experience to offer a piercing perspective on the Cold War from one of its major architects." On Metacritic, the film has a score of 87 out of 100, from 36 critics, indicating "universal acclaim".

Roger Ebert of the Chicago Sun-Times wrote: "Although McNamara is photographed through the Interrotron, the movie is far from offering only a talking head. Morris is uncanny in his ability to bring life to the abstract, and here he uses graphics, charts, moving titles and visual effects in counterpoint to what McNamara is saying."

== The lessons ==
=== In The Fog of War ===
Over the course of the documentary, Morris distills McNamara's philosophy of war into eleven basic tenets:

Lesson #1: Empathize with your enemy.

McNamara repeats this sentence several times throughout the documentary. He discusses a moment during the Cuban Missile Crisis when he and Kennedy were trying to keep the United States out of war, but General Curtis LeMay wanted to invade Cuba. Kennedy received two messages from Nikita Khrushchev during the Crisis, which McNamara refers to as the "soft message" and the "hard message." He says the first message sounded like it came from a "drunk man or one under a lot of stress" and stated that, if the United States guaranteed it would not invade Cuba, the missiles would be removed, while the second stated that, if the United States attacked Cuba, "we're prepared to confront you with masses of military power." Llewellyn Thompson, a former US ambassador to Moscow who knew Khrushchev personally, urged Kennedy to respond to the soft message, as he believed Khrushchev would be willing to remove the missiles if, afterward, he could draw attention away from the fact that he had failed to establish nuclear weapons in Cuba by taking credit for saving Cuba from being invaded by the US. Kennedy eventually agreed with Thompson and the situation was resolved without further escalation.

Lesson #2: Rationality alone will not save us.

McNamara emphasizes that it was luck that prevented nuclear war—rational individuals like Kennedy, Khrushchev, and Castro came close to destroying themselves and each other. He states that the possibility of nuclear destruction still exists today.

Lesson #3: There's something beyond one's self.

This lesson refers to McNamara's private life. He states that "there's something beyond one's self and a responsibility to society" while discussing when he started to court his wife, Margaret Craig McNamara, and had a child. Around this time, WWII began and McNamara became the youngest assistant professor at Harvard.

Lesson #4: Maximize efficiency.

McNamara was brought back from the Eighth Air Force and assigned to the 58th Bomb Wing. He flew in some of the first B-29s, which, it was hoped, would be able to destroy targets much more efficiently and effectively than earlier bombers, and was responsible for analyzing bombing operations and making recommendations for improvements.

Lesson #5: Proportionality should be a guideline in war.

McNamara talks about the proportions of cities destroyed in Japan by the US before the dropping of the nuclear bomb, comparing the destroyed Japanese cities to similarly sized cities in the US: Tokyo, roughly the size of New York City, was 51% destroyed; Toyama, the size of Chattanooga, was 99% destroyed; Nagoya, the size of Los Angeles, was 40% destroyed; Osaka, the size of Chicago, was 35% destroyed; Kobe, the size of Baltimore, was 55% destroyed; etc. He says LeMay once said that, had the United States lost the war, they would have been tried for war crimes, and agrees with this assessment.

Lesson #6: Get the data.

McNamara worked at Ford in an executive position and commissioned studies on subjects like buyer demographics, the causes of accidents, and ways to make cars safer. He was chosen to replace Henry Ford II as president of the company, the first person outside the Ford family to hold that position, though he quit after five weeks to become Kennedy's Secretary of Defense, having first declined an offer to be Secretary of Treasury.

Lesson #7: Belief and seeing are both often wrong.

McNamara affirms Morris' framing of lesson 7 in relation to the Gulf of Tonkin incident: "We see what we want to believe."

Lesson #8: Be prepared to reexamine your reasoning.

McNamara says that, even though the United States is the strongest nation in the world, it should never use that power unilaterally: "if we can't persuade nations with comparable values of the merit of our cause, we better reexamine our reasoning."

Lesson #9: In order to do good, you may have to engage in evil.

McNamara says: "Recognize at times we have to engage in evil, but minimize it."

Lesson #10: Never say never.

McNamara believed the ultimate responsibility for the Vietnam War was on the president and says that, had Kennedy lived, the situation would have unfolded more desirably. In 1968, he resigned as Secretary of Defense (or was fired) and became president of the World Bank.

Lesson #11: You can't change human nature.

McNamara talks about the "fog of war" and how many things only become clear in hindsight.

=== Robert S. McNamara's Ten Lessons ===
(Provided by McNamara to supplement the documentary as a special feature on the DVD release of the film.)

1. The human race will not eliminate war in this century, but we can reduce the brutality of war—the level of killing—by adhering to the principles of a "Just War," in particular to the principle of "proportionality."
2. The indefinite combinations of human fallibility and nuclear weapons will lead to the destruction of nations.
3. We [the United States] are the most powerful nation in the world—economically, politically, and militarily—and we are likely to remain so for decades ahead. But we are not omniscient. If we cannot persuade other nations with similar interests and similar values of the merits of the proposed use of that power, we should not proceed unilaterally except in the unlikely requirement to defend directly the continental U.S., Alaska and Hawaii.
4. Moral principles are often ambiguous guides to foreign policy and defense policy, but surely we can agree that we should establish as a major goal of U.S. foreign policy and, indeed, of foreign policy across the globe: the avoidance, in this century, of the carnage—160 million dead—caused by conflict in the 20th century.
5. We, the richest nation in the world, have failed in our responsibility to our own poor and to the disadvantaged across the world to help them advance their welfare in the most fundamental terms of nutrition, literacy, health and employment.
6. Corporate executives must recognize there is no contradiction between a soft heart and a hard head. Of course, they have responsibilities to stockholders, but they also have responsibilities to their employees, their customers and to society as a whole.
7. President Kennedy believed a primary responsibility of a president—indeed "the" primary responsibility of a president—is to keep the nation out of war, if at all possible.
8. War is a blunt instrument by which to settle disputes between or within nations, and economic sanctions are rarely effective. Therefore, we should build a system of jurisprudence based on the International Court—that the U.S. has refused to support—which would hold individuals responsible for crimes against humanity.
9. If we are to deal effectively with terrorists across the globe, we must develop a sense of empathy—I don't mean "sympathy," but rather "understanding"—to counter their attacks on us and the Western World.
10. One of the greatest dangers we face today is the risk that terrorists will obtain access to weapons of mass destruction as a result of the breakdown of the Non-Proliferation Regime. We in the U.S. are contributing to that breakdown.

=== The Lessons of Vietnam ===
(From McNamara's 1995 book In Retrospect: The Tragedy and Lessons of Vietnam. The following are slightly shortened versions of the text from pages 321-3 of this book.)

1. We misjudged then—and we have since—the geopolitical intentions of our adversaries … and we exaggerated the dangers to the United States of their actions.
2. We viewed the people and leaders of South Vietnam in terms of our own experience … We totally misjudged the political forces within the country.
3. We underestimated the power of nationalism to motivate a people to fight and die for their beliefs and values.
4. Our misjudgments of friend and foe, alike, reflected our profound ignorance of the history, culture, and politics of the people in the area, and the personalities and habits of their leaders.
5. We failed then—and have since—to recognize the limitations of modern, high-technology military equipment, forces, and doctrine. We failed, as well, to adapt our military tactics to the task of winning the hearts and minds of people from a totally different culture.
6. We failed to draw Congress and the American people into a full and frank discussion and debate of the pros and cons of a large-scale military involvement … before we initiated the action.
7. After the action got under way, and unanticipated events forced us off our planned course … we did not fully explain what was happening, and why we were doing what we did.
8. We did not recognize that neither our people nor our leaders are omniscient. Our judgment of what is in another people's or country's best interest should be put to the test of open discussion in international forums. We do not have the God-given right to shape every nation in our image or as we choose.
9. We did not hold to the principle that U.S. military action … should be carried out only in conjunction with multinational forces supported fully (and not merely cosmetically) by the international community.
10. We failed to recognize that in international affairs, as in other aspects of life, there may be problems for which there are no immediate solutions … At times, we may have to live with an imperfect, untidy world.
11. Underlying many of these errors lay our failure to organize the top echelons of the executive branch to deal effectively with the extraordinarily complex range of political and military issues.

== Charity ==
Sony Pictures Classics allowed proceeds from limited screenings of the film to benefit Clear Path International's work with victims of the Vietnam War.

== See also ==
- The Gatekeepers
