= Love Is Blind season 7 =

TV Show

Love Is Blind
- Season 7
- Presented by: Nick Lachey; Vanessa Lachey
- No. of episodes: 13

Release
- Original network: Netflix
- Original release: October 2 – October 30, 2024

Season chronology
- ← Previous; Season 6 Next → Season 8

The seventh season of Love Is Blind premiered on Netflix on October 2, 2024. The season followed singles from Washington, D.C.

== Season summary ==
Couples	Married	Still together	Relationship notes
Taylor and Garrett	Yes	Yes	Married on November 13, 2023 and still together as of July 2026.
Ashley and Tyler	Yes	No	Married in November 2023. Ashley announced their separation and plans to divorce in January 2025; the divorce was finalized in June 2025.
Marissa and Ramses	No	No	Ramses ended the engagement shortly before the wedding after deciding that he was not ready for marriage. Ramses has since stayed single while Marissa is in a new relationship as of October 2025.
Hannah and Nick	No	No	Hannah ended the engagement after deciding that she didn't think Nick was ready for marriage. Both are single as of October 2025.
Alex and Tim	No	No	This couple split shortly after Alex met Tim's family. Tim did not like that Alex took a nap during the visit, and him bringing it up turned into a larger conversation about their communication issues that ended in Tim saying he didn't want to see her again. Both are single as of October 2025.
Monica and Stephen	No	No	This couple ended their engagement shortly after coming back to DC when Monica discovered that Stephen was sending sexual messages to another woman. Despite apologies from Stephen, Monica did not feel like she could continue. Monica is now in a new relationship while Stephen is single as of October 2025.
Brittany and Leo	No	No	Despite getting engaged on camera, Brittany and Leo were not chosen to go on the honeymoon. They took their own vacation to Miami and broke up shortly afterwards. They have stayed close friends, with Leo being single and Brittany being in a new relationship as of October 2025.

== Participants ==
All participants lived in Washington, D.C. at the time of filming.

Name	Age	Occupation	Relationship Status
Taylor Krause	30	Clean Energy Policy Consultant	Married November 2023
Garrett Josemans	33	Quantum Physicist	Married November 2023
Ashley Adionser	32	Marketing Director	Married November 2023; divorced June 2025
Tyler Francis	34	Account Manager	Married November 2023; divorced June 2025
Marissa George	32	Lawyer	Split before the wedding
Ramses Prashad	35	Programme Associate at Justice Reform Non-Profit	Split before the wedding
Hannah Jiles	27	Medical Device Sales	Split before the wedding
Nick Dorka	29	Real Estate Agent	Split before the wedding
Alexandra "Alex" Byrd	33	Producer	Split before the wedding
Tim Godbee	33	Web Content Strategist	Split before the wedding
Monica Davis	37	Sales Executive	Split before the wedding
Stephen Richardson	34	Electrician	Split before the wedding
Brittany Wisniewski	33	Esthetician	Split before the wedding
Leo Braudy	31	Art Dealer	Split before the wedding
Bohdan Olinares	36	Tech Sales	Not engaged
David Romero	29	Project Manager	Not engaged
Jason Drecchio	30	Loan Officer	Not engaged
Nick Pugh	31	Commercial Real Estate Brokerage	Not engaged
Perry Slomnicki	31	Realtor	Not engaged
Raymond Pottebaum	33	Consultant	Not engaged
Tamar Smith	33	Video Editor and Animator	Not engaged
Ally Dawson	31	Master Esthetician	Not engaged
Ashley W	32	Health and Wellness Educator	Not engaged
Dylan Maddox	30	Realtor and Artist	Not engaged
Katie Bollinger	36	Sports Marketing Manager	Not engaged
Morgan Moore	33	Sales Team Lead	Not engaged
Nina Zafar	32	Journalist	Not engaged
Tara Zafar	29	Senior Marketing Manager	Not engaged
Jenny Zamora	31	Account Training Coordinator	Not engaged

=== Future appearances ===
In 2026, Marissa George appeared on season four of Perfect Match.

== Episodes ==
Love Is Blind season 6 episodes
No. overall	No. in season	Title	Original release date
Week 1
84	1	"No More Situationships"	October 2, 2024
85	2	"Perfect Husband, but..."	October 2, 2024
86	3	"Is It Too Late?"	October 2, 2024
87	4	"The Tables Have Turned"	October 2, 2024
88	5	"What The Duck"	October 2, 2024
89	6	"6 Things I Hate About You"	October 2, 2024
Week 2
90	7	"Truth Bombs"	October 9, 2024
91	8	"Dirty Laundry"	October 9, 2024
92	9	"Is Love Enough"	October 9, 2024
Week 3
93	10	"The Text From an Ex"	October 16, 2024
94	11	"The Risk of Falling in Love"	October 16, 2024
Week 4
95	12	"Leap of Faith"	October 23, 2024
Special
96	13	"The Reunion"	October 30, 2024
