= Big Ideas for a Small Planet =

- Starring: Simran Sethi, Majora Carter
- Country of origin: United States
- Original language: English
- No. of seasons: 1
- No. of episodes: 13

Production
- Running time: approx. 25 minutes
- Production company: Scout Productions

Original release
- Network: Sundance Channel
- Release: April 17 – July 10, 2007

Big Ideas for a Small Planet is an American television documentary series on the Sundance Channel which focuses on environmental innovations such as alternative fuel and green building techniques. The series premiered on the iTunes Store prior to its release on the Sundance Channel on April 17, 2007. Simran Sethi and Majora Carter hosted the show.

== Episodes ==
No.	Title	Cast	Original release date
1	"Fuel"	David Suzuki, Laurie David	April 17, 2007
A look at the future of automobile fuel. Included: a truck that runs on vegetable oil; a woman's bio-diesel publicity campaign; a race car running on ethanol at Daytona.
2	"Build"	TBA	April 24, 2007
A visionary architect works with clients to build their first “green” home; a designer describes his real-life tree house made of growing tree trunks; environmentally conscious ideas are introduced into low-income neighborhoods.
3	"Cities"	TBA	May 1, 2007
A real-estate developer turns a polluted field into a flourishing sustainable community; an energy innovator submerges underwater turbines in New York City's East River; guerilla gardeners beautify blighted urban plots of unused land with plants and flowers.
4	"Wear"	TBA	May 8, 2007
A designer creates high-fashion clothes out of eco-friendly fabrics; a sportswear manufacturer recycles used materials for its clothes.
5	"Eat"	TBA	May 15, 2007
A chef shows off his new green restaurant; a burger restaurant uses sustainable meat and produce from farms within 100 miles; a young entrepreneur finds treasure in another man's trash.
6	"Drive"	TBA	May 22, 2007
A Silicon Valley carmaker debuts an electric sports car of the future; an entrepreneur shows off his affordable electric commuter car; a high-school team works on their electric vehicle prior to competing in a variety of road rallies.
7	"Furnish"	TBA	May 29, 2007
A furniture company explores the goal of making all new products 100% sustainable; two designers use leftover scrap wood to create recycled furniture.
8	"Create"	TBA	June 5, 2007
A photographer documents the biodiversity and indigenous cultures of the Arctic National Wildlife Refuge; an artist makes clothing out of audio tape, upholstery and boating sails; a green architect creates a house from a retired 747 airplane.
9	"Kids"	TBA	June 12, 2007
A look at how the new generation is learning about ecology. Featured: profiles of young activists whose accomplishments include saving portions of the Costa Rican rain forest.
10	"Paper or Plastic?"	TBA	June 19, 2007
A look at innovators who are working to make intelligent, eco-friendly design a reality, including a world-renowned architect and designer who is helping the U.S. Postal Service eliminate toxins in its packaging.
11	"Sports"	TBA	June 26, 2007
Profiles of people trying to keep Earth safe for athletic pursuits. Included: the creator of bamboo racing bikes, a champion skier and the distributor of bio-friendly skateboards.
12	"Work"	TBA	July 3, 2007
A visit to a brewing company dedicated to the environment; a look at the office of the future. Also: an analyst audits a Bay Area company to show how it can reduce its environmental impact.
13	"Pray"	TBA	July 10, 2007
A cleric inspires environmental concern with an interfaith coalition dedicated to greening places of worship; an Appalachian woman uses her faith in a battle against mining companies.
