= Tom Forman (producer) =

American television producer

- Born: United States
- Occupation: Television producer
- Notable work: Kid Nation; 9/11

Tom Forman is a television producer who has worked as producer on 29 different shows. He is best known for creating Kid Nation and 9/11. He ran the production company Tom Forman Productions, funded by CBS, before joining Relativity Media in 2008.

== Awards ==
- Shared the Primetime Emmy Award for Outstanding Reality Program in 2005 and 2006 with others who made Extreme Makeover: Home Edition
- Shared the Emmy for Outstanding Non-Fiction Special (Informational) in 2002 for his film 9/11; he was the senior producer and senior writer.
- WGA Award Documentary – Current Events 2003
