= Marsha Bemko =

American television producer

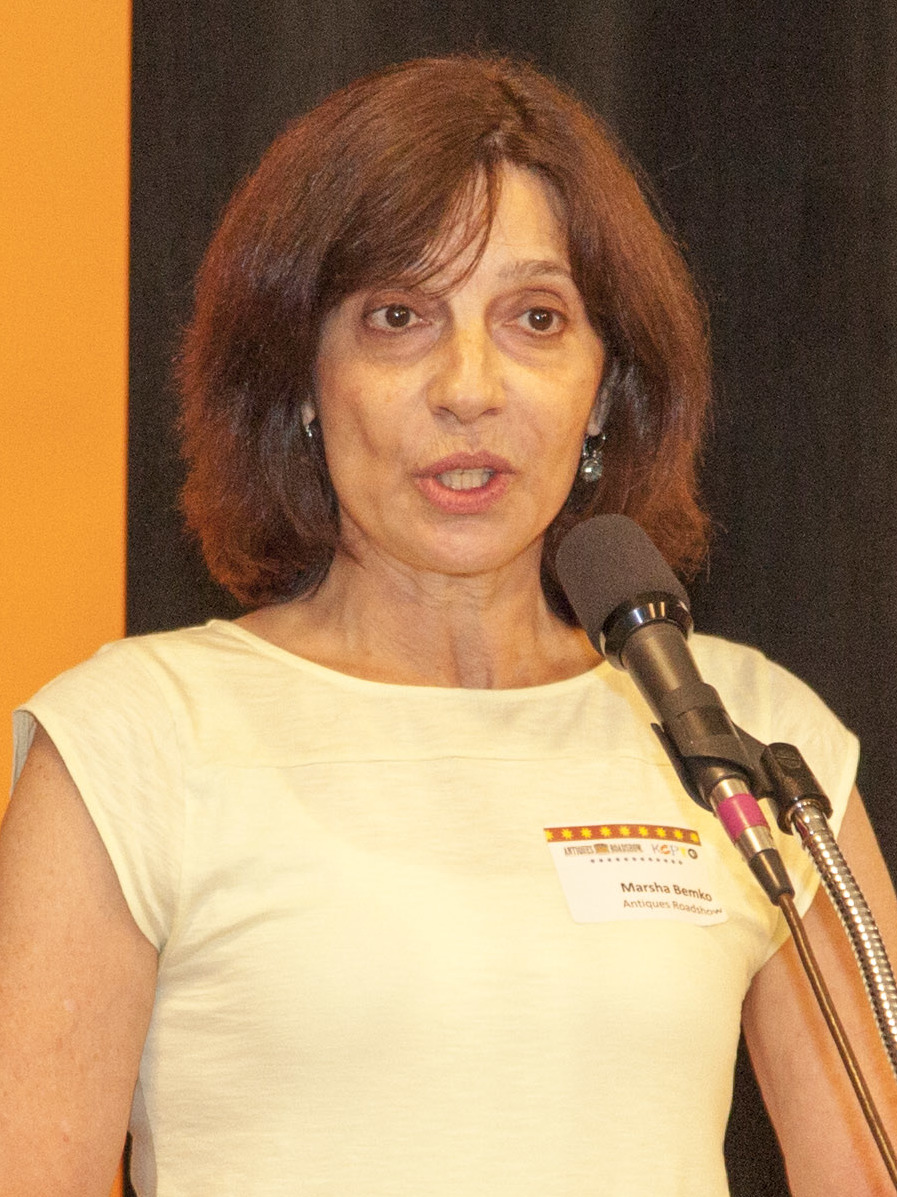
Bemko in 2013

Marsha Bemko is an American television producer. She is the executive producer of the PBS series Antiques Roadshow. In addition to Antiques Roadshow, Bemko is also executive producer for PBS's antiques series Market Warriors.

== Biography ==
Bemko's television career spans 30 years. Prior to joining Roadshow as a senior producer in 1999, Bemko worked on a variety of public affairs programs for PBS. She was WGBH's coordinating producer for national programming and the series producer for Culture Shock (1999), a historical series about censorship in the arts and freedom of expression. Bemko served as coordinating producer for Discovering Women (1995), a series about six women scientists. She worked in a variety of production capacities for the award-winning Frontline public affairs series beginning in 1982.

Bemko's professional background also includes stints as director of marketing for the Boston Marketing Services Group and as a reporter for the Springfield Newspapers.

In addition to her role as executive producer of Antiques Roadshow, Bemko is a sought-after lecturer, appearing across the country at the invitation of community organizations, colleges, business groups, and public television stations, including WGBH where she has mentored aspiring producers as part of the CPB/WGBH Producers Workshop. Bemko also writes for the Antiques Roadshow Insider, a WGBH-licensed newsletter, and she has served on the Opening Night Committee of the Winter Antiques Show.

Bemko is a 1977 graduate of Westfield State College and serves on the Westfield State College Foundation Board of Directors.

== Works ==
- Antiques Roadshow Behind the Scenes, Simon and Schuster, 2009, ISBN 978-1-4391-0330-2
