= American High (TV series) =

American documentary television show

- Genre: Reality, documentary
- Created by: R. J. Cutler
- Country of origin: United States
- Original language: English
- No. of seasons: 1
- No. of episodes: 13

Production
- Executive producer: R. J. Cutler
- Running time: 22 minutes
- Production companies: Actual Reality Pictures; 20th Century Fox Television (2000); Twin Cities Public Television (2001)

Original release
- Network: Fox (later PBS)
- Release: April 4 – June 20, 2001

American High is an American documentary television show about the lives of fourteen students at Highland Park High School, located in the city of Highland Park, Illinois. Created by documentary filmmaker R. J. Cutler, the series originally aired on Fox and was canceled after four episodes. It was later picked up by PBS and aired in its entirety. The show received the 2001 Emmy Award for Outstanding Non-Fiction Program.

The theme song "American High (Now It's Everything)", was written and performed by Bouncing Souls.
