= Alex Graham (producer) =

Scottish television producer and journalist

- Born: 1953 (age 72–73); Glasgow, Scotland
- Education: Hamilton Academy, University of Glasgow
- Occupations: Television producer and journalist

Alex Graham (born 1953) is a Scottish television producer and journalist.

== Biography ==
Born in Glasgow, Scotland, Alexander Graham was educated at the former Hamilton Academy school and the University of Glasgow, subsequently attaining in 1978 a Diploma in Journalism from City University London. While studying at the University of Glasgow in 1976 he co-directed a campaign film highlighting the effects of the public expenditure cuts on university students called "So you think you know about the cuts".

Working as a journalist on the Bradford Telegraph and Argus and The Sunday Times, in 1979 Graham joined London Weekend Television which he left in 1983 for Diverse Productions, becoming editor of Channel 4's current affairs series Diverse Reports and The Media Show. Establishing the television programme production company Wall to Wall Television Ltd. in 1987, Graham has since been involved in the creation and production of numerous hit programmes including, The 1900 House; The 1940s House; A Rather English Marriage; Who Do You Think You Are? and New Tricks. Further productions include Our Boy; Glasgow Kiss; Sex, Chips and Rock 'n' Roll; Baby It’s You; Neanderthal; Body Story; Smallpox 2002; The Edwardian Country House, and Frontier House.

Wall to Wall has been voted one of the top seven independent producers in the world by the trade magazine, Real Screen and has won numerous awards including, BAFTAs; Emmys; Royal Television Society and Peabody Awards and in 2009 won an Oscar for its first documentary feature, Man on Wire. In 2007, Wall to Wall became part of Shed Media Group plc of which board member Alexander Graham is one of the largest shareholders. He is also a member of the board of the Sheffield International Documentary Festival and a former Chairman of Producers' Alliance for Cinema and Television (PACT), now a member of its Patrons' Group.

Alex Graham is a Fellow of the Royal Television Society and of the Royal Society of Arts and a visiting fellow of the University of Bournemouth's Media School. From 2016 to 2021, Graham was chair of the Scott Trust which oversees the Guardian Media Group.
