= Kyan Douglas =

American television personality

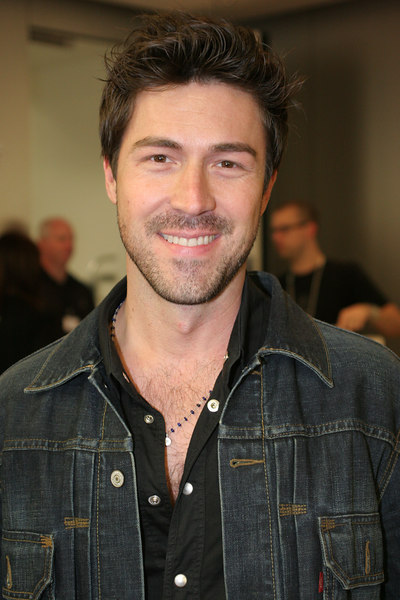
- Douglas in 2006
- Born: Hugh Edward Douglas Jr. May 5, 1970 (age 56); Miami, Florida, U.S.

Kyan Douglas (born Hugh Edward Douglas Jr.; May 5, 1970) is an American television personality and stylist. He was the grooming expert on the American television program Queer Eye from 2003 to 2007.

== Biography ==
Born Hugh Edward Douglas Jr. in Miami, Florida, Kyan Douglas was raised in Tampa and Tallahassee. He has a sister, Kelli (who first taught him about styling hair). After high school he moved first to Dallas, where he studied philosophy at Brookhaven College and first became interested in religion and the healing arts. He then moved to Austin, where he had initially planned to pursue his interest in acting by studying drama at the University of Texas at Austin, though he was precluded by his extreme shyness. In his mid-twenties, he moved to New Orleans, where he earned a degree in TV production and theater studies at Loyola University. In 1996 three of Douglas' close friends were murdered in a restaurant robbery where both they and Douglas worked. This motivated him to leave New Orleans.

Douglas was in a serious relationship with publicist and gay rights activist Gregory Durham from March 2004 to August 2006. In July 2006, they became briefly engaged. He was previously rumored to be dating (in fall 2003) Queer as Folk actor Robert Gant. Gant confirmed to TV Guide that the pair had dated briefly, but were just friends.

Douglas moved from New York to Los Angeles, California in 2007. He told the now defunct TV show Out in Dallas that he wanted to pursue acting, and was taking acting classes. In November 2007, he told Sirius satellite radio channel OutQ that he was in the process of purchasing land in Mexico, and was considering opening a yoga retreat there.

== Career ==
Douglas moved to New York City in 1999 and started work in sales for Aveda, then helped them set up the Aveda Institute, a hairstyling and grooming school. He enrolled in its cosmetology program, and after graduating at the top of his class, he joined the New York-based hair salon Arrojo Studio as a colorist. He began working on the makeover TV shows What Not to Wear and While You Were Out as well. In 2002, a client at Arrojo told him about a makeover show that was being cast. Douglas sent a photo of himself and a short bio he'd written to the producers. They called him for an audition and quickly hired him as the show's "Grooming Guru".

As part of Queer Eye's "Fab Five" Douglas has co-authored a book and appeared on a soundtrack CD and accompanying DVD based on the show, as well as appeared on many magazine covers and TV talk shows. In 2004 he published Beautified, his own book on grooming for women, and became a spokesman and product advisor for L'Oréal. He was also invited back to speak at his alma mater Loyola University New Orleans in 2004.

In 2009, Douglas took over as host of Ten Years Younger (starting with the show's fourth season) on TLC. And for 13 years, he appeared more than 100 times on the Rachael Ray show as a fashion expert, retiring from television in 2022.

== Awards ==
Queer Eye won an Emmy in 2004 for Outstanding Reality Program, and received a nomination again in the same category in 2005. In 2006, Douglas was awarded the HRC's Humanitarian Award for his work with a number of charities, including HRC, DIFFA, and AmFAR.
