= David Collins (producer) =

American television and film producer (born 1967)

- Born: 1967 (age 58–59); Cincinnati, Ohio, U.S.
- Education: Ohio University
- Occupation: Producer
- Known for: Queer Eye

David Collins (born 1967) is an American television and film producer. He is best known for creating the reality television series Queer Eye.

== Early life ==
Collins was born in Cincinnati, Ohio. As a teenager, he was a member of the Future Farmers of America and planned to become a veterinarian. Collins attended Lakota High School, where he was class president and a member of the school choir. Collins studied film and television at Ohio University, graduating in 1989.

== Career ==
His first job in the film industry was working as a production assistant on Jodie Foster's directorial debut, Little Man Tate. Collins then moved to Boston and started Scout Productions with Michael Williams in 1994. Under the banner of Scout, Collins produced such films as Six Ways to Sunday and Session 9. In 2001, Collins came up with the idea for a makeover series with a team of gay "experts" making over a straight man. Queer Eye debuted on July 5, 2003 on Bravo, attracting 1.6 million viewers. The series soon achieved a viewership of 2.3 million, becoming the highest-rated show on the network. Queer Eye ran for five seasons with Collins winning several awards for producing, including a Producers Guild of America Award and a Primetime Emmy Award for Outstanding Structured Reality Program. Collins went on to produce the documentary series Big Ideas for a Small Planet and the television series Cheerleader Camp. In 2017, he approached Netflix to reboot Queer Eye. The first season was released on February 7, 2018 to largely positive critical reviews. The reboot earned Collins another 5 consecutive Primetime Emmy Awards starting in 2018.

In addition to his work as a producer, Collins has also appeared in American Express ads.
