= Billy Campbell (TV executive) =

American television producer (born 1959)

- Born: William M. Campbell III; November 23, 1959 (age 65); Columbia, South Carolina, U.S.

This is about the American entertainment executive born in 1959. For similarly named people, see William Campbell (disambiguation)

Billy Campbell (born November 23, 1959, in Columbia, South Carolina) is an American television executive producer.

== Career ==
Sometime actor including a role in Project Greenlight, Campbell has held many executive posts, including Discovery Channel, where his dismissal was instrumental to the team terminating sponsorship of the Discovery Channel Pro Cycling Team.

On April 1, 2009, Campbell was named president and CEO of Panavision in Los Angeles, California.

== Personal life ==
Campbell was one of the passengers on US Airways Flight 1549 which ditched in the Hudson River, adjacent to Manhattan, on January 15, 2009. Shane P. Allen was cast for Campbell's likeness in Clint Eastwood's 2016 film Sully.
