= 75th Primetime Creative Arts Emmy Awards =

2023 American television programming awards for creative arts

- Date: January 6–7, 2024
- Location: Peacock Theater; Los Angeles, California
- Presented by: Academy of Television Arts & Sciences
- Most awards: The Last of Us (8)
- Most nominations: The Last of Us (19)

Television/radio coverage
- Network: FXX
- Produced by: Bob Bain.
- Directed by: Richard Preuss

The 75th Primetime Creative Arts Emmy Awards honored artistic and technical achievement in American prime time television programs from June 1, 2022, until May 31, 2023, as chosen by the Academy of Television Arts & Sciences. The awards were presented on January 6 and 7, 2024, at the Peacock Theater in Downtown Los Angeles, California. Nominations were announced on July 12, 2023. A total of 100 Creative Arts Emmys were presented across 97 categories. The ceremonies were broadcast in the United States by FXX on January 13.

The Last of Us won eight awards, leading all programs; Welcome to Wrexham followed with five awards. The Last of Us also received the most nominations with nineteen followed by Succession and Ted Lasso with thirteen nominations each. Overall program awards went to Carol Burnett: 90 Years of Laughter + Love, For All Mankind Season 3 Experience, I Think You Should Leave with Tim Robinson, Jeopardy!, Queer Eye, The Simpsons, The 1619 Project, Stanley Tucci: Searching for Italy, Still: A Michael J. Fox Movie, Succession: Controlling the Narrative, The Territory, Welcome to Wrexham, and Weird: The Al Yankovic Story. Among networks and platforms HBO earned the most awards with 22 wins while the same network and its sister service Max received the most nominations with 86.

== Winners and nominees ==
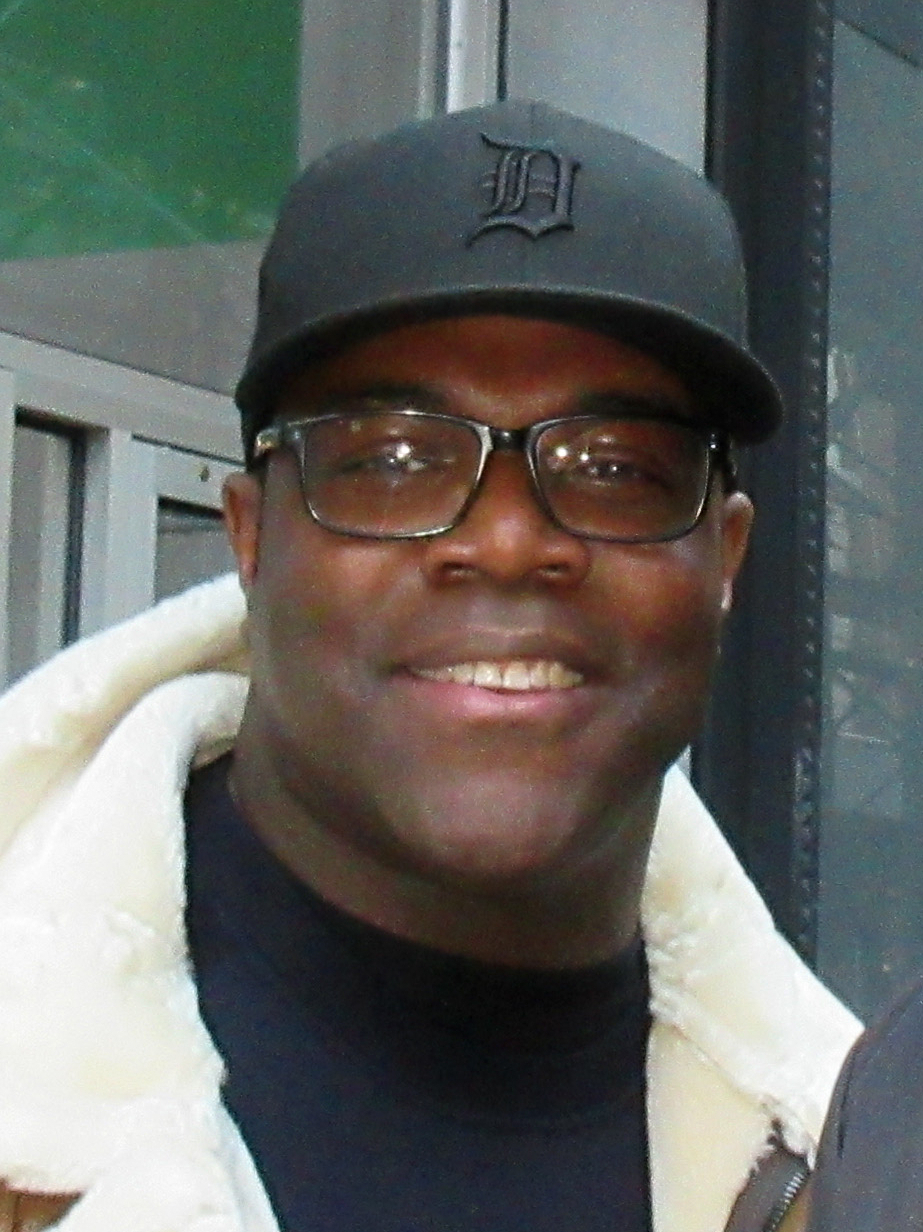
Sam Richardson, Outstanding Guest Actor in a Comedy Series winner

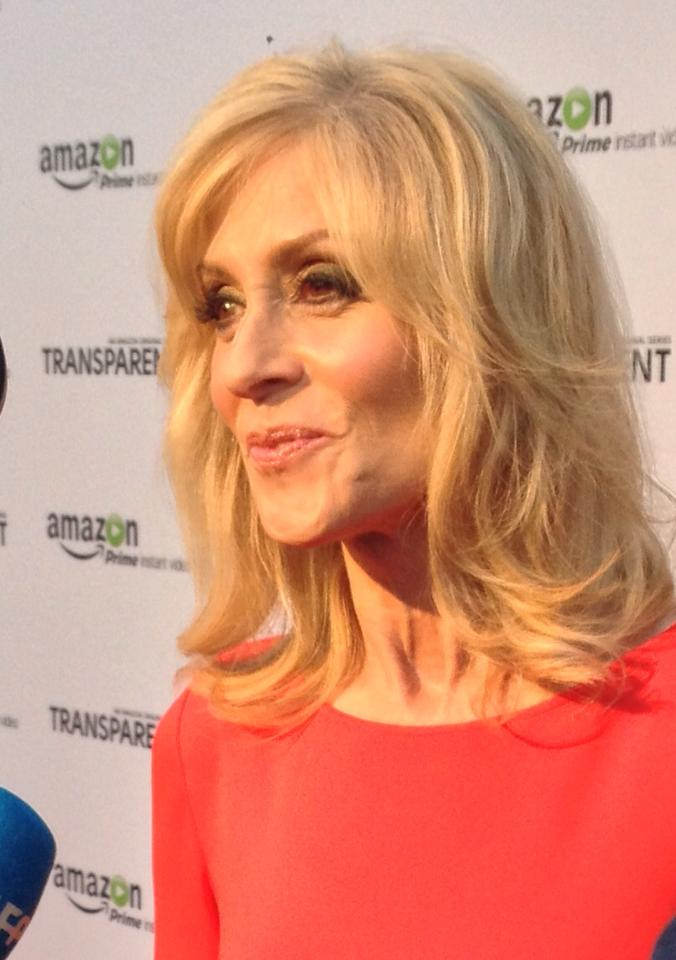
Judith Light, Outstanding Guest Actress in a Comedy Series winner

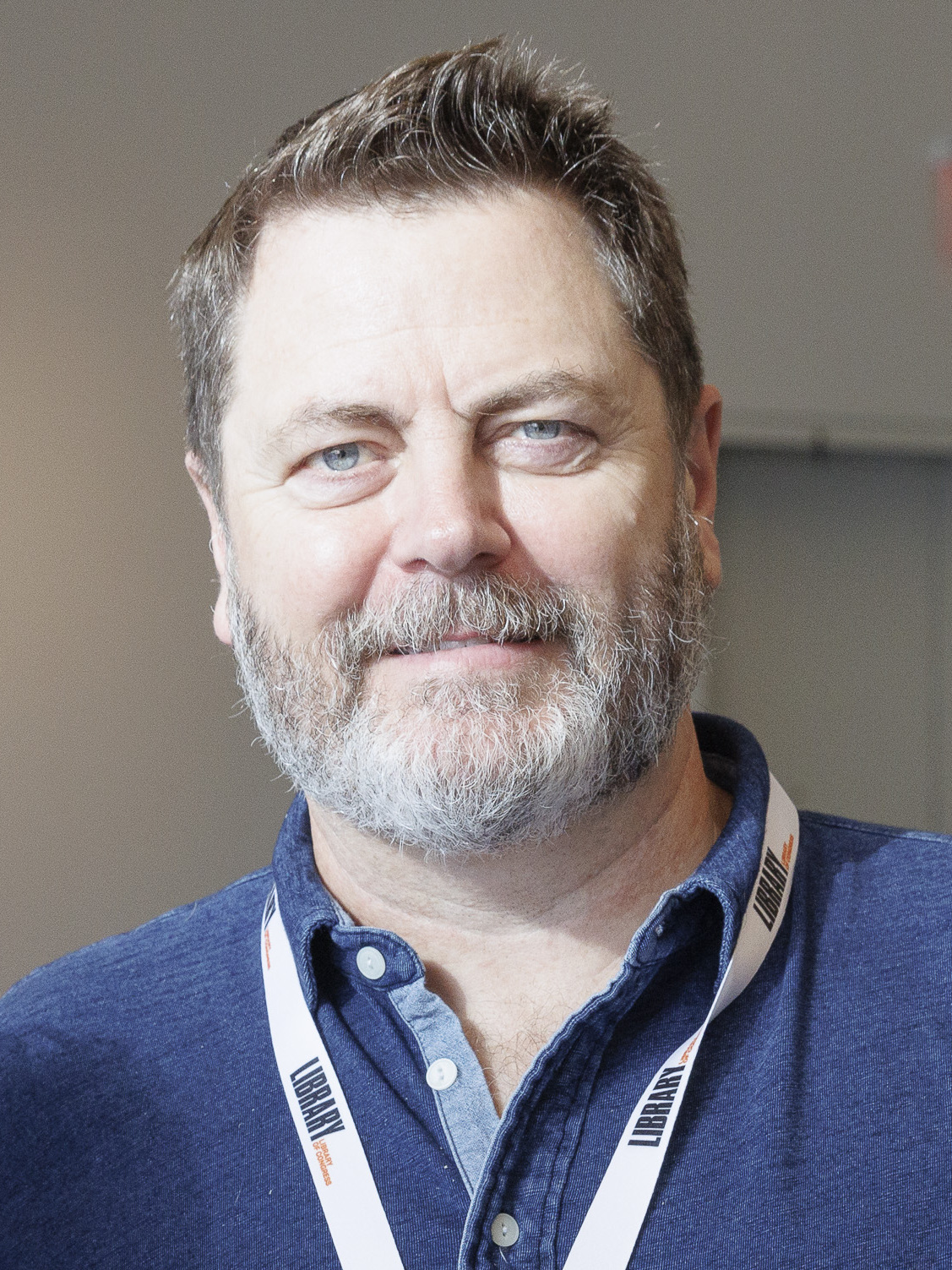
Nick Offerman, Outstanding Guest Actor in a Drama Series winner

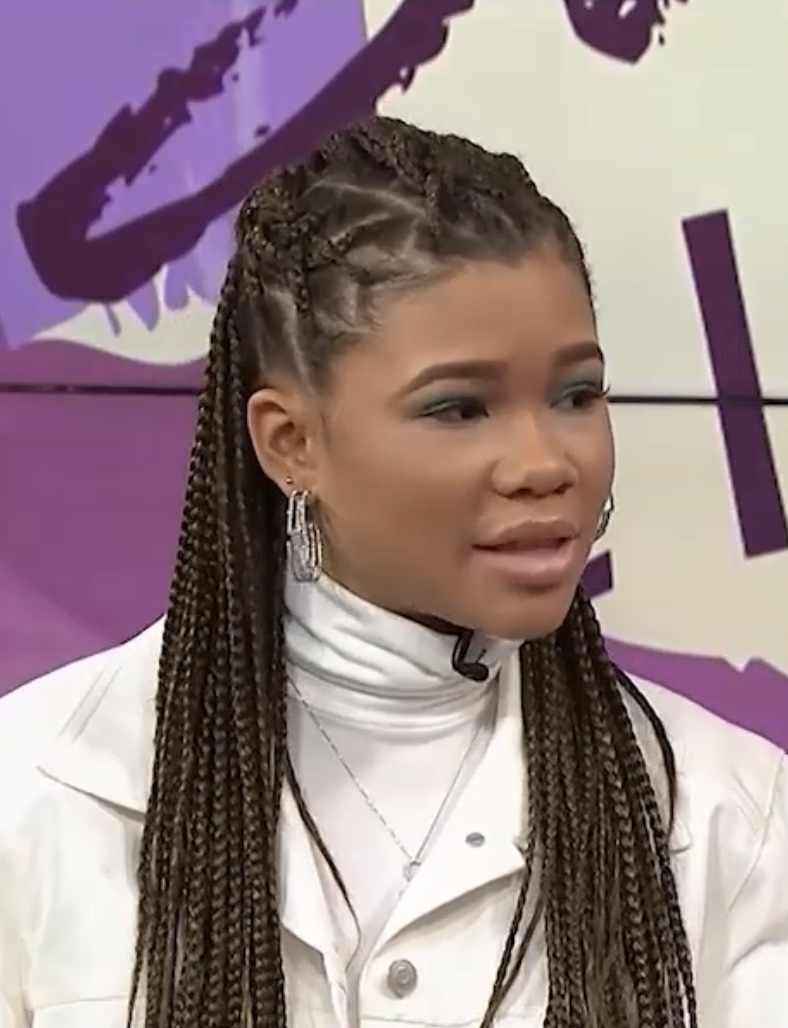
Storm Reid, Outstanding Guest Actress in a Drama Series winner

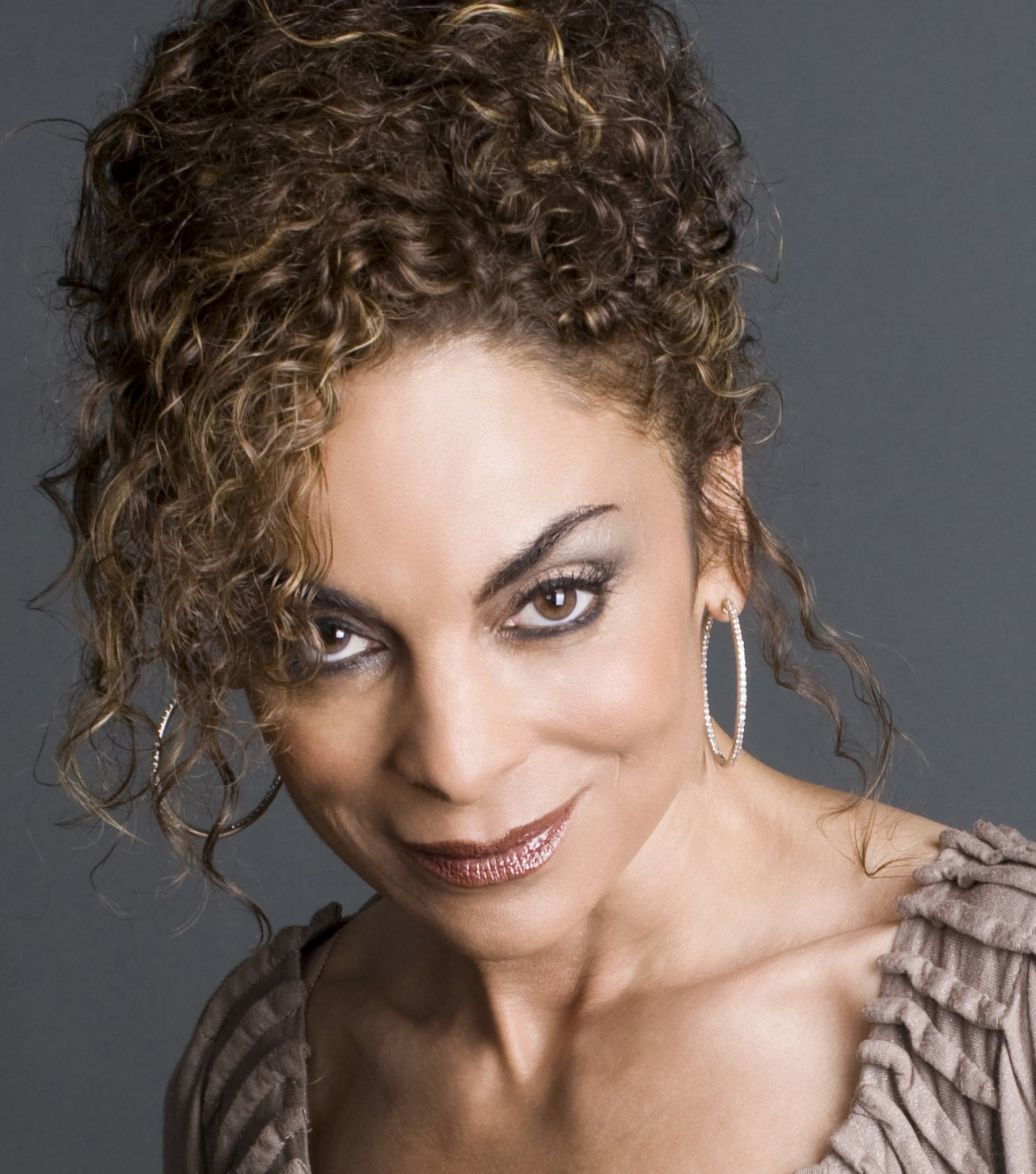
Jasmine Guy, Outstanding Actress in a Short Form Comedy or Drama Series winner

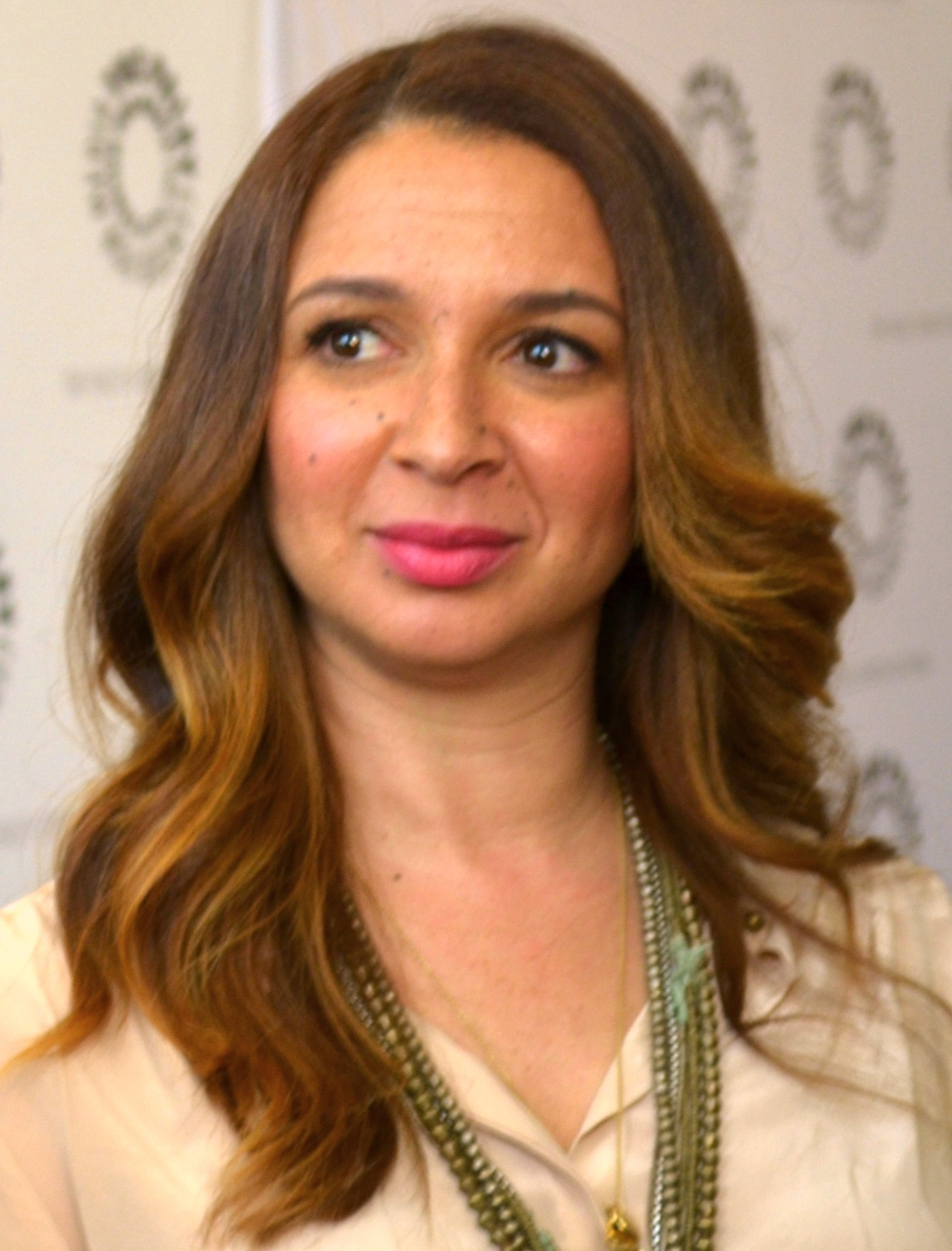
Maya Rudolph, Outstanding Character Voice-Over Performance winner

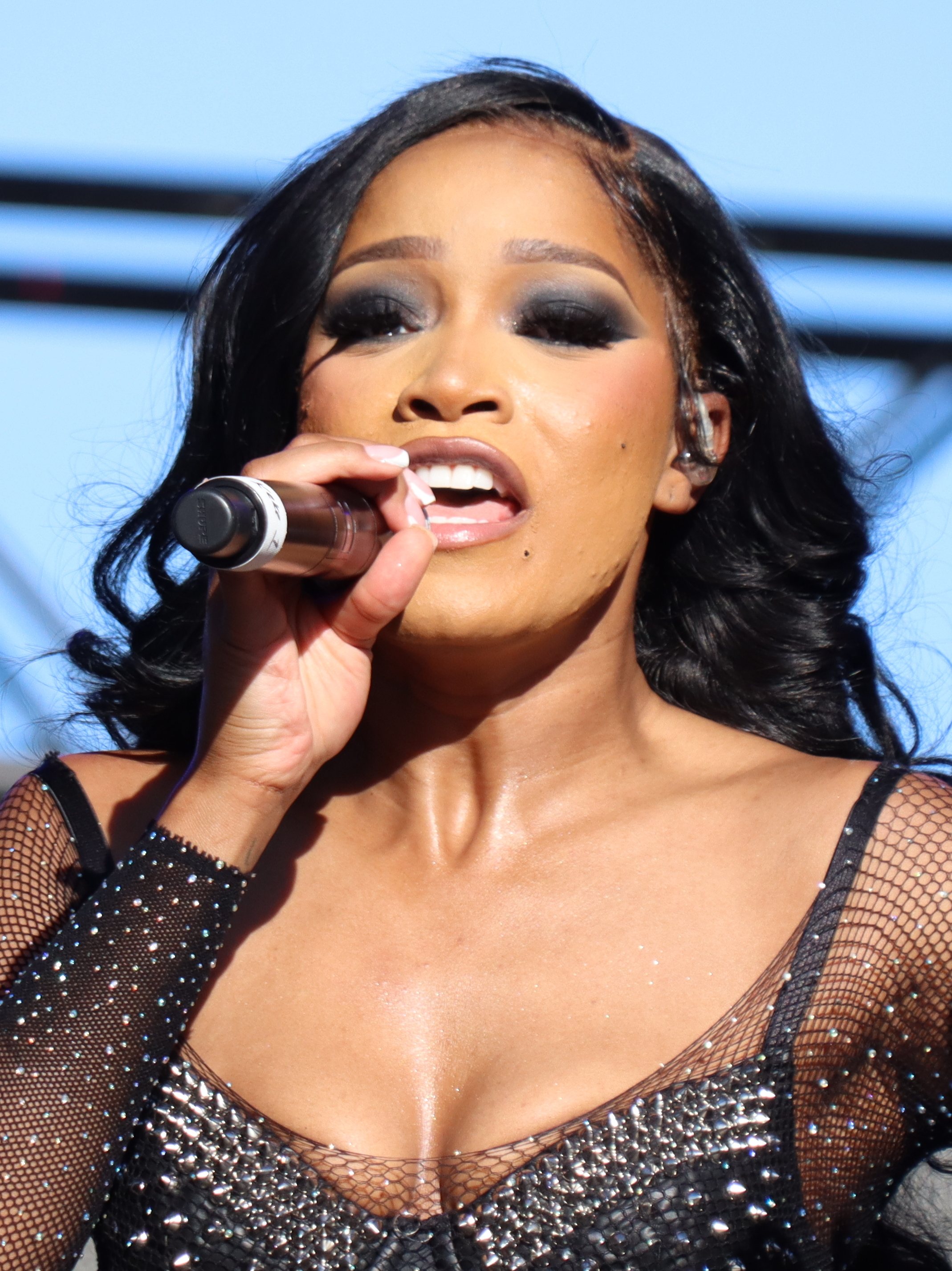
Keke Palmer, Outstanding Host for a Game Show winner

Barack Obama, Outstanding Narrator winner

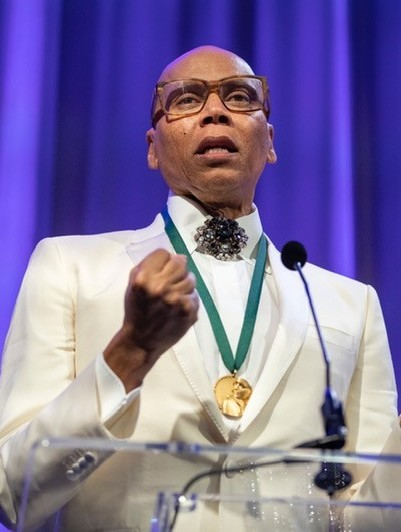
RuPaul, Outstanding Host for a Reality or Competition Program winner

Winners are listed first, highlighted in boldface, and indicated with a double dagger (‡). (Note: The outlets listed for each program are the U.S. broadcasters or streaming services identified in the nominations, which for some international productions are different than the broadcaster(s) that originally commissioned the program. Programs broadcast by HBO or Max were listed as "HBO Max" in the nominations list; only the original broadcaster is listed below.) Sections are based upon the categories listed in the 2022–2023 Emmy rules and procedures. Area awards and juried awards are denoted next to the category names as applicable. (Note: Area awards are non-competitive; any nominee with at least 90% approval receives an Emmy. If no nominee receives 90% approval, the nominee with the highest approval receives an Emmy; for area awards in picture editing and sound mixing, there is an additional requirement that the highest-rated nominee must have at least 50% approval.; Juried awards generally do not have nominations; instead, all entrants are screened before members of the appropriate peer group, and one, more than one, or no entry is awarded an Emmy based on the jury's vote.) For simplicity, producers who received nominations for program awards have been omitted.

=== Programs ===
Programs
**Outstanding Television Movie**: **Weird: The Al Yankovic Story (The Roku Channel)**‡; Dolly Parton's Mountain Magic Christmas (NBC); Fire Island (Hulu); Hocus Pocus 2 (Disney+); Prey (Hulu)	**Outstanding Variety Special (Pre-Recorded)**: **Carol Burnett: 90 Years of Laughter + Love (NBC)**‡; John Mulaney: Baby J (Netflix); Lizzo: Live in Concert (Max); Norman Lear: 100 Years of Music & Laughter (ABC); Trevor Noah: I Wish You Would (Netflix); Wanda Sykes: I'm an Entertainer (Netflix)
**Outstanding Game Show**: **Jeopardy! (ABC / Syndicated)**‡; Family Feud (ABC / Syndicated); The Price Is Right (CBS); That's My Jam (NBC); Wheel of Fortune (Syndicated)	**Outstanding Animated Program**: **The Simpsons: "Treehouse of Horror XXXIII" (Fox)**‡; Bob's Burgers: "The Plight Before Christmas" (Fox); Entergalactic (Netflix); Genndy Tartakovsky's Primal: "Shadow of Fate" (Adult Swim); Rick and Morty: "Night Family" (Adult Swim)
**Outstanding Structured Reality Program**: **Queer Eye (Netflix)**‡; Antiques Roadshow (PBS); Diners, Drive-Ins and Dives (Food Network); Love Is Blind (Netflix); Shark Tank (ABC)	**Outstanding Unstructured Reality Program**: **Welcome to Wrexham (FX)**‡; Indian Matchmaking (Netflix); RuPaul's Drag Race: Untucked (MTV); Selling Sunset (Netflix); Vanderpump Rules (Bravo)
**Outstanding Documentary or Nonfiction Series (Area)**: **The 1619 Project (Hulu)**‡; Dear Mama (FX); 100 Foot Wave (HBO); Secrets of the Elephants (Nat Geo); The U.S. and the Holocaust (PBS)	**Outstanding Documentary or Nonfiction Special (Area)**: **Still: A Michael J. Fox Movie (Apple TV+)**‡; Being Mary Tyler Moore (HBO); Judy Blume Forever (Prime Video); My Transparent Life (Prime Video); Pamela, a Love Story (Netflix)
**Outstanding Hosted Nonfiction Series or Special (Area)**: **Stanley Tucci: Searching for Italy (CNN)**‡; The Light We Carry: Michelle Obama and Oprah Winfrey (Netflix); My Next Guest with David Letterman and Volodymyr Zelenskyy (Netflix); Taste the Nation with Padma Lakshmi (Hulu); United Shades of America with W. Kamau Bell (CNN)	**Exceptional Merit in Documentary Filmmaking (Juried)**: **The Territory (Nat Geo)**‡; The Accused: Damned or Devoted? (PBS); Aftershock (Hulu); Last Flight Home (Paramount+)
**Outstanding Short Form Comedy, Drama or Variety Series**: **I Think You Should Leave with Tim Robinson (Netflix)**‡; Awkwafina is Hangin' with Grandma (Comedy Central); Better Call Saul: Filmmaker Training (AMC); Carpool Karaoke: The Series (Apple TV+); Only Murders in the Building: One Killer Question (Hulu)	**Outstanding Short Form Nonfiction or Reality Series**: **Succession: Controlling the Narrative (HBO)**‡; House of the Dragon: Inside the Episode (HBO); The Last of Us: Inside the Episode (HBO); Saturday Night Live Presents: Behind the Sketch (NBC); The White Lotus: Unpacking the Episode (HBO)
**Outstanding Emerging Media Program**: **For All Mankind Season 3 Experience (Apple TV+)**‡; Gorillaz Presents (Google); MLK: Now Is the Time (Oculus); The Notorious B.I.G Sky's the Limit: A VR Concert Experience (Facebook / Meta Horizon Worlds); You Destroy. We Create | The War on Ukraine's Culture (Meta Quest TV)	**Outstanding Innovation in Emerging Media Programming (Juried)** No award given

=== Performing ===
Performing
**Outstanding Guest Actor in a Comedy Series**: **Sam Richardson – Ted Lasso: "International Break" as Edwin Akufo (Apple TV+)**‡; Jon Bernthal – The Bear: "Braciole" as Michael "Mikey" Berzatto (FX); Luke Kirby – The Marvelous Mrs. Maisel: "Four Minutes" as Lenny Bruce (Prime Video); Nathan Lane – Only Murders in the Building: "Here's Looking at You" as Teddy Dimas (Hulu); Pedro Pascal – Saturday Night Live: "Host: Pedro Pascal" as host (NBC); Oliver Platt – The Bear: "Dogs" as Jimmy "Cicero" Kalinowski (FX)	**Outstanding Guest Actress in a Comedy Series**: **Judith Light – Poker Face: "Time of the Monkey" as Irene Smothers (Peacock)**‡; Becky Ann Baker – Ted Lasso: "Mom City" as Dottie Lasso (Apple TV+); Quinta Brunson – Saturday Night Live: "Host: Quinta Brunson" as host (NBC); Taraji P. Henson – Abbott Elementary: "Mom" as Vanetta Teagues (ABC); Sarah Niles – Ted Lasso: "Smells Like Mean Spirit" as Dr. Sharon M. Fieldstone (Apple TV+); Harriet Walter – Ted Lasso: "So Long, Farewell" as Deborah (Apple TV+)
**Outstanding Guest Actor in a Drama Series**: **Nick Offerman – The Last of Us: "Long, Long Time" as Bill (HBO)**‡; Murray Bartlett – The Last of Us: "Long, Long Time" as Frank (HBO); James Cromwell – Succession: "Church and State" as Ewan Roy (HBO); Lamar Johnson – The Last of Us: "Endure and Survive" as Henry (HBO); Arian Moayed – Succession: "Honeymoon States" as Stewy Hosseini (HBO); Keivonn Montreal Woodard – The Last of Us: "Endure and Survive" as Sam (HBO)	**Outstanding Guest Actress in a Drama Series**: **Storm Reid – The Last of Us: "Left Behind" as Riley Abel (HBO)**‡; Hiam Abbass – Succession: "Honeymoon States" as Marcia (HBO); Cherry Jones – Succession: "The Munsters" as Nan Pierce (HBO); Melanie Lynskey – The Last of Us: "Endure and Survive" as Kathleen (HBO); Anna Torv – The Last of Us: "Infected" as Theresa "Tess" Servopoulos (HBO); Harriet Walter – Succession: "Church and State" as Lady Caroline Collingwood (HBO)
**Outstanding Actor in a Short Form Comedy or Drama Series**: **Tim Robinson – I Think You Should Leave with Tim Robinson as various characters (Netflix)**‡; Kevin Hart – Die Hart 2: Die Harter as Kevin Hart (The Roku Channel); Ben Schwartz – Die Hart 2: Die Harter as Andre (The Roku Channel)	**Outstanding Actress in a Short Form Comedy or Drama Series**: **Jasmine Guy – Chronicles of Jessica Wu as Barbara Baldwin (Prime Video)**‡; Nathalie Emmanuel – Die Hart 2: Die Harter as Jordan King (The Roku Channel); Paula Pell – Die Hart 2: Die Harter as Cynthia (The Roku Channel)
**Outstanding Character Voice-Over Performance**: **Maya Rudolph – Big Mouth: "Asexual Healing" as Connie the Hormone Monstress (Netflix)**‡; Julie Andrews – Queen Charlotte: A Bridgerton Story: "Honeymoon Bliss" as Lady Whistledown (Netflix); Alex Borstein – Family Guy: "A Bottle Episode" as Lois Griffin (Fox); Mel Brooks – History of the World, Part II: "VIII" as Narrator (Hulu); Wanda Sykes – Crank Yankers: "Wanda Sykes, JB Smoove & Adam Carolla" as Gladys Murphy (Comedy Central); Ali Wong – Tuca & Bertie: "Fledging Day" as Bertie (Adult Swim)	**Outstanding Narrator**: **Barack Obama – Working: What We Do All Day: "The Middle" (Netflix)**‡; Mahershala Ali – Chimp Empire: "Reckoning" (Netflix); Angela Bassett – Good Night Oppy (Prime Video); Morgan Freeman – Our Universe: "Chasing Starlight" (Netflix); Pedro Pascal – Patagonia: Life on the Edge of the World: "Mountains" (CNN)
**Outstanding Host for a Game Show**: **Keke Palmer – Password (NBC)**‡; Mayim Bialik – Jeopardy! (ABC / Syndicated); Steve Harvey – Family Feud (ABC / Syndicated); Ken Jennings – Jeopardy! (ABC / Syndicated); Pat Sajak – Wheel of Fortune (Syndicated)	**Outstanding Host for a Reality or Competition Program**: **RuPaul – RuPaul's Drag Race (MTV)**‡; Karamo Brown, Antoni Porowski, Tan France, Bobby Berk, and Jonathan Van Ness – Queer Eye (Netflix); Nicole Byer – Nailed It! (Netflix); Padma Lakshmi – Top Chef (Bravo); Amy Poehler and Maya Rudolph – Baking It (Peacock)

=== Animation ===
Animation
**Outstanding Individual Achievement in Animation (Juried)**
- **Entergalactic – Meybis Ruiz Cruz (Netflix)**‡
- **More Than I Want to Remember – Maya Edelman (Paramount+)**‡
- **The Simpsons: "Lisa the Boy Scout" – Nik Ranieri (Fox)**‡
- **Star Wars: Visions: "Screecher's Reach" – Almu Redondo (Disney+)**‡

=== Art Direction ===
Art Direction
**Outstanding Production Design for a Narrative Contemporary Program (One Hour or More) (Area)**: **Wednesday: "Wednesday's Child Is Full of Woe" – Mark Scruton, Adrian Curelea, and Robert Hepburn (Netflix)**‡; The Last of Us: "Infected" – John Paino, Don Macaulay, and Paul Healy (HBO); Poker Face: "The Orpheus Syndrome" – Judy Rhee, Martha Sparrow, and Cathy Marshall (Peacock); Succession: "America Decides" – Stephen H. Carter, Molly Mikula, and George DeTitta Jr. (HBO); Ted Lasso: "Sunflowers" – Paul Cripps, Iain White, and Kate Goodman (Apple TV+); The White Lotus: "Ciao" – Cristina Onori, Gianpaolo Rifino, and Letizia Santucci (HBO)	**Outstanding Production Design for a Narrative Period or Fantasy Program (One Hour or More) (Area)**: **Guillermo del Toro's Cabinet of Curiosities – Tamara Deverell, Brandt Gordon, and Shane Vieau (Netflix)**‡; Daisy Jones & the Six: "Track 10: Rock 'n' Roll Suicide" – Jessica Kender, Brian Grego, Lisa Clark, and Andi Brittan (Prime Video); House of the Dragon: "The Heirs of the Dragon" – Jim Clay, Dominic Masters, and Claire Nia Richards (HBO); The Marvelous Mrs. Maisel: "Susan" – Bill Groom, Neil Prince, and Ellen Christiansen (Prime Video); Perry Mason: "Chapter Eleven" – Keith P. Cunningham, Ian Scroggins, and Halina Siwolop (HBO)
**Outstanding Production Design for a Narrative Program (Half-Hour) (Area)**: **Only Murders in the Building: "Sparring Partners" / "I Know Who Did It" – Patrick Howe, Jordan Jacobs, and Rich Murray (Hulu)**‡; The Bear: "System" – Sam Lisenco, Eric Dean, and Emily Carter (FX); How I Met Your Father: "The Reset Button" / "Ride or Die" / "Daddy" – Glenda Rovello, Conny Boettger-Marinos, and Amy Beth Feldman (Hulu); Schmigadoon!: "Famous as Hell" – Jamie Walker McCall, Ryan Garton, Gregory Clarke, and Carol Lavallee (Apple TV+); What We Do in the Shadows: "The Night Market" – Shayne Fox, Aaron Noël, and Kerri Wylie (FX)	**Outstanding Production Design for a Variety, Reality or Competition Series (Area)**: **Saturday Night Live: "Host: Steve Martin & Martin Short" / "Host: Jenna Ortega" – Akira Yoshimura, Keith Ian Raywood, Andrea Purcigliotti, and Danielle Webb (NBC)**‡; A Black Lady Sketch Show: "Peek-A-Boob, Your Titty's Out" – Cindy Chao, Michele Yu, and Lizzie Boyle (HBO); Last Week Tonight with John Oliver: "Museums" – Eric Morrell and Sabrina Lederer (HBO); Queer Eye: "Speedy for Life" – Thomas Rouse and Tyka Edwards (Netflix); RuPaul's Drag Race: "Blame It on the Edit" – Gianna Costa and Brad Bailey (MTV)
**Outstanding Production Design for a Variety Special (Area)**: **The Apple Music Super Bowl LVII Halftime Show Starring Rihanna – Bruce Rodgers, Shelley Rodgers, Lindsey Breslauer, Maria Garcia, and Lily Rodgers (Fox)**‡; Carol Burnett: 90 Years of Laughter + Love – Tamlyn Wright and Travis Deck (NBC); Encanto at the Hollywood Bowl – Misty Buckley, Joe Celli, and Raquel Tarbet (Disney+); The 65th Annual Grammy Awards – Julio Himede and Kristen Merlino (CBS); The Oscars – Misty Buckley, Alana Billingsley, and John Zuiker (ABC)

=== Casting ===
Casting
**Outstanding Casting for a Comedy Series**: **The Bear – Jeanie Bacharach, Jennifer Rudnicke, Mickie Paskal, and AJ Links (FX)**‡; Abbott Elementary – Wendy O'Brien and Chris Gehrt (ABC); Jury Duty – Susie Farris (Amazon Freevee); Only Murders in the Building – Bernard Telsey, Tiffany Little Canfield, and Destiny Lilly (Hulu); Ted Lasso – Theo Park (Apple TV+)	**Outstanding Casting for a Drama Series**: **The White Lotus – Meredith Tucker, Francesco Vedovati, and Barbara Giordani (HBO)**‡; Bad Sisters – Nina Gold and Lucy Amos (Apple TV+); The Crown – Robert Sterne (Netflix); The Last of Us – Victoria Thomas, Corinne Clark, and Jennifer Page (HBO); Succession – Avy Kaufman (HBO); Yellowjackets – Junie Lowry Johnson, Libby Goldstein, Corinne Clark, and Jennifer Page (Showtime)
**Outstanding Casting for a Limited or Anthology Series or Movie**: **Beef – Charlene Lee and Claire Koonce (Netflix)**‡; Dahmer – Monster: The Jeffrey Dahmer Story – Robert J. Ulrich, Eric Dawson, and Carol Kritzer (Netflix); Daisy Jones & the Six – Justine Arteta and Kim Davis-Wagner (Prime Video); Fleishman Is in Trouble – Laura Rosenthal and Jodi Angstreich (FX); Weird: The Al Yankovic Story – Wendy O'Brien (The Roku Channel)	**Outstanding Casting for a Reality Program**: **The Traitors – Erin Tomasello, Jazzy Collins, Moira Paris, and Holly Osifat (Peacock)**‡; Love Is Blind – Donna Driscoll, Stephanie Lewis, and Claire Loeb (Netflix); Queer Eye – Quinn Fegan, Jessica Jorgensen, Keya Mason, and Lauren Levine (Netflix); RuPaul's Drag Race – Goloka Bolte, Ethan Petersen, Adam Cook, and Michelle Redwine (MTV); Top Chef – Ron Mare, Sena Rich, and Erinlee Skilton (Bravo)

=== Choreography ===
Choreography
**Outstanding Choreography for Variety or Reality Programming (Juried)**: **Dancing with the Stars: "Higher" – Derek Hough (Disney+)**‡; Beauty and the Beast: A 30th Celebration: "Be Our Guest" – Jamal Sims, Phillip Chbeeb, and Makenzie Dustman (ABC); Beauty and the Beast: A 30th Celebration: "Rose Petal Suite Pt. I" – Phillip Chbeeb and Makenzie Dustman (ABC); Encanto at the Hollywood Bowl: "The Family Madrigal" / "Surface Pressure" – Jamal Sims (Disney+); Savage X Fenty Show Vol. 4: "Chameleon" / "Pride Rock" – Parris Goebel (Prime Video)	**Outstanding Choreography for Scripted Programming (Juried)**: **Blindspotting: "The History" / "San Quentin Blues" – Jon Boogz (Starz)**‡; Grease: Rise of the Pink Ladies: "New Cool" / "Hand Jive" / "The Boom" – Jamal Sims (Paramount+); Grease: Rise of the Pink Ladies: "Pulling Strings" / "Hit Me Again" / "High Rollin'" – Jeffrey Mortensen and Louise Hradsky (Paramount+); The Marvelous Mrs. Maisel: "Trash Man" / "Dream Kitchen" – Marguerite Derricks (Prime Video); Schmigadoon!: "Bells and Whistles" / "Good Enough to Eat" / "Bustin' Out" – Christopher Gattelli (Apple TV+)

=== Cinematography ===
Cinematography
**Outstanding Cinematography for a Series (Half-Hour)**: **Atlanta: "Andrew Wyeth. Alfred's World." – Christian Sprenger (FX)**‡; Barry: "tricky legacies" – Carl Herse (HBO); How I Met Your Father: "Daddy" – Gary Baum (Hulu); The Mandalorian: "Chapter 20: The Foundling" – Dean Cundey (Disney+); Only Murders in the Building: "I Know Who Did It" – Chris Teague (Hulu); Schmigadoon!: "Something Real" – Jon Joffin (Apple TV+)	**Outstanding Cinematography for a Series (One Hour)**: **The Marvelous Mrs. Maisel: "Four Minutes" – M. David Mullen (Prime Video)**‡; Andor: "Rix Road" – Damián García (Disney+); The Crown: "Mou Mou" – Adriano Goldman (Netflix); House of the Dragon: "The Lord of the Tides" – Catherine Goldschmidt (HBO); The Old Man: "I" – Sean Porter (FX); Wednesday: "Woe What a Night" – David Lanzenberg (Netflix)
**Outstanding Cinematography for a Limited or Anthology Series or Movie**: **Black Bird: "Hand to Mouth" – Natalie Kingston (Apple TV+)**‡; Boston Strangler – Ben Kutchins (Hulu); Dead Ringers: "One" – Jody Lee Lipes (Prime Video); George & Tammy: "Stand by Your Man" – Igor Martinovic (Showtime); Guillermo del Toro's Cabinet of Curiosities: "The Autopsy" – Anastas Michos (Netflix)	**Outstanding Cinematography for a Nonfiction Program**: **100 Foot Wave: "Chapter VI – Force Majeure" – Antoine Chicoye, Mikey Corker, Vincent Kardasik, Alexandre Lesbats, Chris Smith, Laurent Pujol, João Vidinha, and Michael Darrigade (HBO)**‡; Secrets of the Elephants: "Desert" – Toby Strong, James Boon, and Bob Poole (Nat Geo); The 1619 Project: "Justice" – Jerry Henry (Hulu); Stanley Tucci: Searching for Italy: "Calabria" – Andrew Muggleton (CNN); Still: A Michael J. Fox Movie – C. Kim Miles, Clair Popkin, and Julia Liu (Apple TV+); The Territory – Alex Pritz and Tangãi Uru-eu-wau-wa (Nat Geo)
**Outstanding Cinematography for a Reality Program**: **Welcome to Wrexham: "Do or Die" – Alastair McKevitt, Craig Hastings, Leighton Cox, and Jason Bulley (FX)**‡; The Amazing Race – Joshua Gitersonke, Bryan T. Adams, Kathryn Barrows, Josh Bartel, Kurt Carpenter, David D'Angelo, Matthew Di Girolamo, Adam Haisinger, Robert Howsam, Kevin R. Johnson, Jay Kaufman, Ian Kerr, Daniel Long, Lucas Kenna Mertes, Ryan Shaw, and Alan Weeks (CBS); Deadliest Catch: "Call of a New Generation" – David Reichert, Charlie Beck, Bryan Miller, Todd Stanley, Shane Moore, Nathan Garofalos, and David Arnold (Discovery Channel); Life Below Zero: "The Pursuit" – Danny Day, Simeon Houtman, Jason Hubbell, Ben Mullin, and Zach Vincent (Nat Geo); Survivor – Peter Wery, Scott Duncan, Russ Fill, George Andrews, Tim Barker, Marc Bennett, Paulo Castillo, Rodney Chauvin, Chris Ellison, Nixon George, Matthias Hoffmann, Toby Hogan, Derek Holt, Efrain "Mofi" Laguna, Ian Miller, Nico Nyoni, Paul Peddinghaus, Jeff Phillips, Nejc Poberaj, Daniel Powell, Louis Powell, Jovan Sales, Erick Sarmiento, Dirk Steyn, John Tattersall, Holly Thompson, Paulo Velozo, Cullum Andrews, Christopher Barker, Granger Scholtz, Nic Van Der Westhuizen, and Dwight Winston (CBS)

=== Commercial ===
Commercial
**Outstanding Commercial**
- **"The Greatest – Accessibility" – Somesuch and Apple (Apple)**‡
  - "Call Me with Timothée Chalamet" – MJZ and Media Arts Lab (Apple TV+)
  - "Cost of Beauty" – Smuggler and Ogilvy (Dove)
  - "Forever" – Sanctuary (The Farmer's Dog)
  - "Quiet the Noise" – Iconoclast TV and Media Arts Lab (AirPods)
  - "R.I.P. Leon" – Biscuit Filmworks and Apple (Apple)
  - "The Singularity" – Smuggler and Squarespace (Squarespace)

=== Costumes ===
Costumes
**Outstanding Period Costumes for a Series (Area)**: **The Great: "Choose Your Weapon" – Sharon Long, Claire Tremlett, Basia Kuznar, and Anna Lau (Hulu)**‡; The Crown: "Mou Mou" – Amy Roberts, Sidonie Roberts, and Christof Roche-Gordon (Netflix); The Marvelous Mrs. Maisel: "Susan" – Donna Zakowska, Katie Hartsoe, Ben Philipp, Amanda Seymour, Claire Aquila, and Marie Seifts (Prime Video); Perry Mason: "Chapter Ten" – Catherine Adair, David J. Matwijkow, and Nanrose Buchman (HBO); Queen Charlotte: A Bridgerton Story: "Crown Jewels" – Lyn Elizabeth Paolo, Laura Frecon, Jovana Gospavic, and Alex Locke (Netflix)	**Outstanding Period Costumes for a Limited or Anthology Series or Movie (Area)**: **Daisy Jones & the Six: "Track 8: Looks Like We Made It" – Denise Wingate and Derek Sullivan (Prime Video)**‡; Dahmer – Monster: The Jeffrey Dahmer Story: "Please Don't Go" – Rudy Mance, Monica Chamberlain, Desmond Smith, and Suzy Freeman (Netflix); George & Tammy: "We're Gonna Hold On" – Mitchell Travers, Mitchel Wolf, Laurel Rose, Aileen Abercrombie, Susan Russell, and Charles Carter (Showtime); Guillermo del Toro's Cabinet of Curiosities: "Dreams in the Witch House" – Luis Sequeira, Ann Steel, and Heather Crepp (Netflix); Welcome to Chippendales: "Leeches" – Peggy Schnitzer, Derek Bulger, and Julie Heath (Hulu)
**Outstanding Fantasy/Sci-Fi Costumes (Area)**: **House of the Dragon: "The Heirs of the Dragon" – Jany Temime, Katherine Burchill, Paul Yeowell, Rachel George, and Joanna Lynch (HBO)**‡; Hocus Pocus 2 – Salvador Perez, Elizabeth Shelton, and Gala Autumn (Disney+); The Lord of the Rings: The Rings of Power: "A Shadow of the Past" – Kate Hawley, Libby Dempster, Lucy McLay, Jaindra Watson, Pip Lingard, and Jenny Rushton (Prime Video); The Mandalorian: "Chapter 22: Guns for Hire" – Shawna Trpcic, Elissa Alcala, Julie Robar, and Julie Yang Silver (Disney+); Obi-Wan Kenobi: "Part I" – Suttirat Anne Larlarb, Stacia Lang, and Lynda Foote (Disney+); What We Do in the Shadows: "The Wedding" – Laura Montgomery, Barbara Cardoso, and Judy Laukkanen (FX)	**Outstanding Contemporary Costumes for a Series (Area)**: **Wednesday: "Wednesday's Child Is Full of Woe" – Colleen Atwood, Mark Sutherland, Robin Soutar, Claudia Littlefield, and Adina Bucur (Netflix)**‡; Emily in Paris: "What's It All About..." – Marylin Fitoussi, Herehau Ragonneau, Daniela Telle, and Marie Fremont (Netflix); The Last of Us: "Endure and Survive" – Cynthia Ann Summers, Kelsey Chobotar, Rebecca Toon, and Michelle Carr (HBO); Only Murders in the Building: "Framed" – Dana Covarrubias, Abby Geoghegan, and Kathleen Gerlach (Hulu); Succession: "Church and State" – Michelle Matland, Jonathan Schwartz, and Mark Agnes (HBO); The White Lotus: "That's Amore" – Alex Bovaird, Brian Sprouse, and Margherita Zanobetti (HBO)
**Outstanding Contemporary Costumes for a Limited or Anthology Series or Movie (Area)**: **Beef: "The Birds Don't Sing, They Screech in Pain" – Helen Huang, Austin Wittick, YJ Hwang, and Mark Anthony Summers (Netflix)**‡; Dolly Parton's Mountain Magic Christmas – Provi Fulp, Jose Ramos, and Steve Summers (NBC); Fleishman Is in Trouble: "Me-Time" – Leah Katznelson, Angel Peart, Katie Novello, Deirdre Wegner, and Anne Newton-Harding (FX); Swarm: "Honey" – Dominique Dawson, Brittny Chapman, and Mashal Khan (Prime Video); The Watcher: "Welcome, Friends" – Lou Eyrich, Rudy Mance, Catherine Crabtree, and Zakiya Dennis (Netflix)	**Outstanding Costumes for Variety, Nonfiction, or Reality Programming (Juried)**: **Beauty and the Beast: A 30th Celebration – Marina Toybina, Grainne O'Sullivan, Gabrielle Letamendi, Courtney Webster, Arleen Flores, and Danae McQueen (ABC)**‡; **We're Here: "St. George, Utah" – Diego Montoya, Marco Morante, Joshua "Domino" Schwartz, Blake Danford, Sharon Malka, and Ricky Reynoso (HBO)**‡

=== Directing ===
Directing
**Outstanding Directing for a Variety Series**: **Saturday Night Live: "Co-Hosts: Steve Martin & Martin Short" – Liz Patrick (NBC)**‡; Jimmy Kimmel Live!: "20th Anniversary Special" – Andy Fisher (ABC); Last Week Tonight with John Oliver: "Afghanistan" – Paul Pennolino (HBO); The Late Show with Stephen Colbert: "John Oliver; Broadway Cast of The Lion King" – Jim Hoskinson (CBS); The Problem with Jon Stewart: "Chaos, Law, and Order" – André Allen (Apple TV+)	**Outstanding Directing for a Variety Special**: **The Apple Music Super Bowl LVII Halftime Show Starring Rihanna – Hamish Hamilton and Shawn Carter (Fox)**‡; Carol Burnett: 90 Years of Laughter + Love – Paul Miller (NBC); Chris Rock: Selective Outrage – Joel Gallen (Netflix); The Oscars – Glenn Weiss (ABC); Wanda Sykes: I'm an Entertainer – Linda Mendoza (Netflix)
**Outstanding Directing for a Documentary/Nonfiction Program**: **Still: A Michael J. Fox Movie – Davis Guggenheim (Apple TV+)**‡; Judy Blume Forever – Davina Pardo and Leah Wolchok (Prime Video); Moonage Daydream – Brett Morgen (HBO); Pretty Baby: Brooke Shields – Lana Wilson (Hulu); The Territory – Alex Pritz (Nat Geo); The U.S. and the Holocaust: "Episode 3: The Homeless, The Tempest-tossed (1942–)" – Ken Burns, Lynn Novick, and Sarah Botstein (PBS)	**Outstanding Directing for a Reality Program**: **Welcome to Wrexham: "Wide World of Wales" – Bryan Rowland (FX)**‡; The Amazing Race: "Patience, Is the New Me" – Bertram van Munster (CBS); Queer Eye: "Speedy for Life" – Ali Moghadas (Netflix); RuPaul's Drag Race: "Wigloose: The Rusical!" – Nick Murray (MTV); Top Chef: "London Calling" – Ariel Boles (Bravo)

=== Hairstyling ===
Hairstyling
**Outstanding Contemporary Hairstyling**: **The White Lotus: "Abductions" – Miia Kovero, Elena Gregorini, and Italo Di Pinto (HBO)**‡; Abbott Elementary: "Festival" – Moira Frazier, Dustin Osborne, and Christina Joseph (ABC); Emily in Paris: "Coo D'état" – Carole Nicolas, Mike Désir, Frédéric Souquet, Miharu Oshima, Jessie Durimel, and Julien Parizet (Netflix); The Last of Us: "Long, Long Time" – Chris Glimsdale, Penny Thompson, and Courtney Ullrich (HBO); Only Murders in the Building: "I Know Who Did It" – Betsy Reyes, Tonia Ciccone, Fabian Garcia, and Kerrie Smith (Hulu); P-Valley: "Snow" – Arlene Martin, Latoya Kelley Howard, Kasi York, LeVura Geuka, and Jason Yancey (Starz); Ted Lasso: "So Long, Farewell" – Nicky Austin, Nikki Springall, Sophie Roberts, and Nicola Pope (Apple TV+)	**Outstanding Period and/or Character Hairstyling (Area)**: **Queen Charlotte: A Bridgerton Story: "Crown Jewels" – Nic Collins and Giorgio Galliero (Netflix)**‡; The Crown: "Mou Mou" – Cate Hall and Emilie Yong Mills (Netflix); Dahmer – Monster: The Jeffrey Dahmer Story: "Lionel" – Shay Sanford-Fong, Maggie Hayes Jackson, Michael S. Ward, and Havanna Pratt (Netflix); The Mandalorian: "Chapter 19: The Convert" – Maria Sandoval, Ashleigh Childers, and Sallie Ciganovich (Disney+); The Marvelous Mrs. Maisel: "A House Full of Extremely Lame Horses" – Kimberley Spiteri, Keleen Snowgren, Diana Sikes, Valerie Gladstone, Emily Rosko, and Matthew Armentrout (Prime Video)
**Outstanding Hairstyling for a Variety, Nonfiction or Reality Program (Juried)**: **We're Here: "St. George, Utah" – Abdiel "Gloria" Urcullu and Tyler Funicelli (HBO)**‡

=== Lighting Design / Lighting Direction ===
Lighting Design and Lighting Direction
**Outstanding Lighting Design / Lighting Direction for a Variety Series (Area)**: **Dancing with the Stars: "Semi Finals" – Noah Mitz, Michael Berger, Patrick Brazil, Andrew Law, Matt Benson, Matt McAdam, and Luke Chantrell (Disney+)**‡; America's Got Talent: "Episode 1717" – Noah Mitz, Will Gossett, Ryan Tanker, Patrick Brazil, Jay Koch, Matt Benson, Scott Chmielewski, and Kevin Faust (NBC); American Idol: "Top 20" – Tom Sutherland, Bobby Grey, Nathan Files, James Coldicott, Hunter Selby, Scott Chmielewski, Luke Chantrell, and Ed Moore (ABC); So You Think You Can Dance: "Starry Starry Night" – Robert Barnhart, Matt Firestone, Pete Radice, Patrick Boozer, Jeff Behm, and Christopher Gray (Fox); The Voice: "Live Finale, Part 2" – Oscar Dominguez, Ronald Wirsgalla, Erin Anderson, Andrew Munie, Jeff Shood, Daniel Boland, and Terrance Ho (NBC)	**Outstanding Lighting Design / Lighting Direction for a Variety Special (Area)**: **2022 Rock and Roll Hall of Fame Induction Ceremony – Allen Branton, Darren Langer, Felix Peralta, Kevin Lawson, Alex Flores, Bianca Moncada, Chuck Reilly, and Guy Jones (HBO)**‡; Encanto at the Hollywood Bowl – Al Gurdon, Harry Forster, Bobby Grey, Darien Koop, James Coldicott, Chris Hill, and Ed Moore (Disney+); The 65th Annual Grammy Awards – Noah Mitz, Andy O'Reilly, Patrick Boozer, Ryan Tanker, Madigan Stehly, Bryan Klunder, Erin Anderson, Will Gossett, Matthew Cotter, Terrance Ho, and Guy Jones (CBS); 75th Annual Tony Awards – Robert Dickinson, Noah Mitz, Harry Sangmeister, Tyler Ericson, Richard Beck, Jason Rudolph, JM Hurley, and Ka Lai Wong (CBS); The Weeknd: Live at SoFi Stadium – Jason Baeri, Joe Bay, Kille Knoble, Mark Butts, and Loren Barton (HBO)

=== Main Title and Motion Design ===
Main Title and Motion Design
**Outstanding Main Title Design**: **The Last of Us – Andy Hall, Nadia Tzuo, Gryun Kim, Min Shi, Jun Kim, and Xiaolin (Mike) Zeng (HBO)**‡; Guillermo del Toro's Cabinet of Curiosities – Mike Schaeffer, Chet Hirsch, David Rowley, and Akshay Tiwari (Netflix); Hello Tomorrow! – Ronnie Koff, Lexi Gunvaldson, Christoph Gabathuler, Juan Monasterio, Lindsey Mayer-Beug, and Fernando Lazzari (Apple TV+); The Lord of the Rings: The Rings of Power – Katrina Crawford, Mark Bashore, Anthony Vitagliano, and Fernando Domínguez Cózar (Prime Video); Wednesday – Aaron Becker, Joseph Ahn, James Ramirez, Lee Nelson, Eric Keller, and Hsien Lun Su (Netflix); The White Lotus – Katrina Crawford, Mark Bashore, Lezio Lopes, and Cian McKenna (HBO)	**Outstanding Motion Design (Juried)**: **Ms. Marvel – Ian Spendloff, David Lochhead, Daniella Marsh, David Stumpf, Philip Robinson, and Matthew Thomas (Disney+)**‡

=== Makeup ===
Makeup
**Outstanding Contemporary Makeup (Non-Prosthetic)**: **Wednesday: "Woe What a Night" – Tara McDonald, Freda Ellis, Nirvana Jalalvand, Tamara Meade, and Bianca Boeroiu (Netflix)**‡; American Horror Stories: "Bloody Mary" – Tyson Fountaine, Ron Pipes, Gage Hubbard, Heather Cummings, Natasha Marcelina, and Michael Johnston (FX); Emily in Paris: "What's It All About..." – Aurélie Payen, Corinne Maillard, Joséphine Bouchereau, Sarah Damen, and Ivana Carboni (Netflix); The Last of Us: "Long, Long Time" – Connie Parker and Joanna Mireau (HBO); Star Trek: Picard: "Võx" – Silvina Knight, Tanya Cookingham, Allyson Carey, Peter De Oliveira, Hanny Eisen, and Kim Ayers (Paramount+); The White Lotus: "That's Amore" – Rebecca Hickey, Federica Emidi, Francesca Antonetti, and Rosa Saba (HBO)	**Outstanding Period and/or Character Makeup (Non-Prosthetic) (Area)**: **The Marvelous Mrs. Maisel: "Susan" – Patricia Regan, Claus Lulla, Joseph A. Campayno, Michael Laudati, Tomasina Smith, and Roberto Baez (Prime Video)**‡; Dahmer – Monster: The Jeffrey Dahmer Story: "Bad Meat" – Gigi Williams and Michelle Audrina Kim (Netflix); Daisy Jones & the Six: "Track 10: Rock 'n' Roll Suicide" – Rebecca Wachtel, Sherri Simmons, RJ McCasland, Kim Perrodin, and Darla Edin (Prime Video); House of the Dragon: "We Light the Way" – Amanda Knight, Hannah Eccleston, Heather McMullen, Kashiya Hinds, Harriet Thompson, Natalie Wickens, and Bonny Monger (HBO); The Mandalorian: "Chapter 22: Guns for Hire" – Cristina Waltz, Ana Gabriela Quinonez Urrego, Alex Perrone, and Crystal Gomez (Disney+); Stranger Things: "Chapter Nine: The Piggyback" – Amy L. Forsythe, Devin Morales, Erin Keith, Nataleigh Verrengia, Benji Dove, Jan Rooney, Lisa Poe, and Rocco Gaglioti, Jr. (Netflix)
**Outstanding Makeup for a Variety, Nonfiction or Reality Program (Juried)**: **Beauty and the Beast: A 30th Celebration – Bruce Grayson, James MacKinnon, Sam Fine, Julie Socash, Melanie Hughes-Weaver, Neicy Small, Alexei Dmitriew, and Tyson Fountaine (ABC)**‡	**Outstanding Prosthetic Makeup (Area)**: **The Last of Us: "Infected" – Barrie Gower, Sarah Gower, Paul Spateri, Nelly Guimaras Sanjuan, Johnny Murphy, Joel Hall, and Lucy Pittard (HBO)**‡; Guillermo del Toro's Cabinet of Curiosities: "Dreams in the Witch House" – Sean Sansom, Shane Zander, Kyle Glencross, Mike Hill, and Megan Many (Netflix); House of the Dragon: "The Lord of the Tides" – Barrie Gower, Sarah Gower, Emma Faulkes, Duncan Jarman, and Paula Eden (HBO); The Lord of the Rings: The Rings of Power: "Adar" – Jason Docherty, Dan Perry, Mark Knight, and Simon Rose (Prime Video); Star Trek: Picard: "The Last Generation" – James Mackinnon, Hugo Villasenor, Bianca Appice, Kevin Wasner, Afton Storton, Kevin Haney, Neville Page, and Vincent Van Dyke (Paramount+)

=== Music ===
Music
**Outstanding Music Composition for a Series (Original Dramatic Score)**: **The White Lotus: "In the Sandbox" – Cristobal Tapia de Veer (HBO)**‡; Andor: "Rix Road" – Nicholas Britell (Disney+); The Last of Us: "Long, Long Time" – Gustavo Santaolalla (HBO); Succession: "Connor's Wedding" – Nicholas Britell (HBO); Wednesday: "Woe Is the Loneliest Number" – Danny Elfman and Chris Bacon (Netflix)	**Outstanding Music Composition for a Limited or Anthology Series, Movie or Special (Original Dramatic Score)**: **Weird: The Al Yankovic Story – Leo Birenberg and Zach Robinson (The Roku Channel)**‡; Hocus Pocus 2 – John Debney (Disney+); Ms. Marvel: "Time and Again" – Laura Karpman (Disney+); Prey – Sarah Schachner (Hulu); A Small Light: "What Can Be Saved" – Ariel Marx (Nat Geo)
**Outstanding Music Composition for a Documentary Series or Special (Original Dramatic Score)**: **Still: A Michael J. Fox Movie – John Powell (Apple TV+)**‡; Eva Longoria: Searching for Mexico: "Veracruz" – Tony Morales (CNN); Light & Magic: "Gang of Outsiders" – James Newton Howard (Disney+); Pamela, a Love Story – Blake Neely (Netflix); Prehistoric Planet: "Badlands" – Hans Zimmer, Anže Rozman, and Kara Talve (Apple TV+)	**Outstanding Music Direction**: **Library of Congress Gershwin Prize for Popular Song: Joni Mitchell – Greg Phillinganes (PBS)**‡; The Apple Music Super Bowl LVII Halftime Show Starring Rihanna – Adam Blackstone and Omar Edwards (Fox); The Oscars – Rickey Minor (ABC); 2022 Rock and Roll Hall of Fame Induction Ceremony – Adam Blackstone (HBO); Saturday Night Live: "Host: Austin Butler" – Lenny Pickett, Leon Pendarvis, and Eli Brueggemann (NBC)
**Outstanding Original Music and Lyrics**: **Ted Lasso: "So Long, Farewell" – "A Beautiful Game" by Ed Sheeran, Foy Vance, and Max Martin (Apple TV+)**‡; Ginny & Georgia: "Hark! Darkness Descends!" – "Marriage Is a Dungeon" by Lili Haydn and Ben Bromfield (Netflix); The L Word: Generation Q: "Questions for the Universe" – "All About Me" by Heather McIntosh, Taura Stinson, and Allyson Newman (Showtime); The Marvelous Mrs. Maisel: "Susan" – "Your Personal Trash Man Can" by Curtis Moore and Thomas Mizer (Prime Video); Ted Lasso: "Mom City" – "Fought & Lost" by Tom Howe, Jamie Hartman, and Sam Ryder (Apple TV+); Weird: The Al Yankovic Story – "Now You Know" by Al Yankovic (The Roku Channel)	**Outstanding Original Main Title Theme Music**: **Wednesday – Danny Elfman (Netflix)**‡; Andor – Nicholas Britell (Disney+); Guillermo del Toro's Cabinet of Curiosities – Holly Amber Church (Netflix); The Lord of the Rings: The Rings of Power – Howard Shore (Prime Video); Ms. Marvel – Laura Karpman (Disney+)
**Outstanding Music Supervision**: **The White Lotus: "Bull Elephants" – Gabe Hilfer (HBO)**‡; Daisy Jones & the Six: "Track 8: Looks Like We Made It" – Frankie Pine (Prime Video); The Marvelous Mrs. Maisel: "Four Minutes" – Robin Urdang (Prime Video); Stranger Things: "Chapter Nine: The Piggyback" – Nora Felder (Netflix); Ted Lasso: "So Long, Farewell" – Tony Von Pervieux and Christa Miller (Apple TV+)

=== Picture Editing ===
Picture Editing
**Outstanding Picture Editing for a Drama Series**: **The Last of Us: "Endure and Survive" – Timothy A. Good and Emily Mendez (HBO)**‡; Better Call Saul: "Saul Gone" – Skip Macdonald (AMC); Succession: "America Decides" – Jane Rizzo (HBO); Succession: "Connor's Wedding" – Bill Henry (HBO); Succession: "With Open Eyes" – Ken Eluto (HBO); The White Lotus: "Abductions" – Heather Persons (HBO); The White Lotus: "Arrivederci" – John M. Valerio (HBO)	**Outstanding Picture Editing for a Multi-Camera Comedy Series**: **Night Court: "Pilot" – Kirk Benson and Chris Poulos (NBC)**‡; Call Me Kat: "Call Me Consciously Uncoupled" – Pamela Marshall (Fox); How I Met Your Father: "Daddy" – Russell Griffin (Hulu); The Upshaws: "Duct Up" – Russell Griffin and Angel Gamboa Bryant (Netflix); The Upshaws: "Off Beat" – Angel Gamboa Bryant (Netflix)
**Outstanding Picture Editing for a Single-Camera Comedy Series**: **The Bear: "System" – Joanna Naugle (FX)**‡; Barry: "wow" – Franky Guttman and Ali Greer (HBO); Only Murders in the Building: "The Last Day of Bunny Folger" – Peggy Tachdjian (Hulu); Ted Lasso: "Mom City" – A.J. Catoline and Alex Szabo (Apple TV+); Ted Lasso: "So Long, Farewell" – Melissa McCoy and Francesca Castro (Apple TV+); What We Do in the Shadows: "Go Flip Yourself" – Yana Gorskaya and Dane McMaster (FX)	**Outstanding Picture Editing for a Limited or Anthology Series or Movie**: **Beef: "Figures of Light" – Nat Fuller and Laura Zempel (Netflix)**‡; Dahmer – Monster: The Jeffrey Dahmer Story: "The Good Boy Box" – Stephanie Filo (Netflix); Ms. Marvel: "Generation Why" – Nona Khodai and Sabrina Plisco (Disney+); Obi-Wan Kenobi: "Part VI" – Kelley Dixon and Josh Earl (Disney+); Prey – Angela M. Catanzaro and Claudia Castello (Hulu); Weird: The Al Yankovic Story – Jamie Kennedy (The Roku Channel)
**Outstanding Picture Editing for Variety Programming (Area)**: **A Black Lady Sketch Show: "My Love Language Is Words of Defamation" – Stephanie Filo, Malinda Zehner Guerra, and Taylor Joy Mason (HBO)**‡; Carol Burnett: 90 Years of Laughter + Love – Mike Polito and Timothy Schultz (NBC); The Daily Show with Trevor Noah: "Jordan Klepper Shows Trump Supporters January 6th Hearing Clips" – Storm Choi, Eric Davies, Tom Favilla, Lauren Beckett Jackson, Nikolai Johnson, Ryan Middleton, Mark Paone, Erin Shannon, Catherine Trasborg, and Einar Westerlund (Comedy Central); History of the World, Part II: "III" – Angel Gamboa Bryant, Stephanie Filo, Daniel Flesher, and George Mandl (Hulu); Saturday Night Live: "HBO Mario Kart Trailer" (Segment) – Ryan Spears and Christopher Salerno (NBC)	**Outstanding Picture Editing for a Nonfiction Program**: **Still: A Michael J. Fox Movie – Michael Harte (Apple TV+)**‡; Moonage Daydream – Brett Morgen (HBO); 100 Foot Wave: "Chapter III – Jaws" – Alex Bayer, Alex Keipper, and Quin O'Brien (HBO); Pretty Baby: Brooke Shields – David Teague, Sara Newens, and Anne Yao (Hulu); The 1619 Project: "Justice" – Ephraim Kirkwood, Jesse Allain-Marcus, and Adriana Pacheco (Hulu); Stanley Tucci: Searching for Italy: "Calabria" – Liz Roe (CNN)
**Outstanding Picture Editing for a Structured Reality or Competition Program**: **RuPaul's Drag Race: "Wigloose: The Rusical!" – Jamie Martin, Paul Cross, Ryan Mallick, and Michael Roha (MTV)**‡; The Amazing Race – Eric Beetner, Kevin Blum, Trevor Campbell, Kellen Cruden, Jay Gammill, Katherine Griffin, Jason Groothuis, Darrick Lazo, Ryan Leamy, Josh Lowry, Paul Nielsen, and Steve Mellon (CBS); Queer Eye: "Speedy for Life" – Toni Ann Carabello, Nova Taylor, Jason Szabo, Widgie Nikia Figaro, Sean Gill, and Kimberly Pellnat (Netflix); Survivor: "Telenovela" – Bill Bowden, Evan Mediuch, Francisco Santa Maria, Plowden Schumacher, Andrew Bolhuis, Jacob Teixeira, and James Ciccarello (CBS); Top Chef – Steve Lichtenstein, Ericka Concha, Blanka Kovacs, Eric Lambert, Matt Reynolds, Jay M. Rogers, Brian Freundlich, Brian Giberson, Malia Jurick, Brian Kane, Daniel Ruiz, Anthony J. Rivard, Annie Tighe, and Tony West (Bravo)	**Outstanding Picture Editing for an Unstructured Reality Program**: **Welcome to Wrexham: "Do or Die" – Mohamed El Manasterly, Curtis McConnell, Michael Brown, Charles Little, and Bryan Rowland (FX)**‡; Deadliest Catch: "Call of a New Generation" – Rob Butler, Isaiah Camp, Alexandra Moore, Alexander Rubinow, Ian Olsen, Hugh Elliott, and Joe Mikan (Discovery Channel); Life Below Zero: "A Storm to Remember" – Michael Swingler, Tony Diaz, Matt Edwards, Jennifer Nelson, and Tanner Roth (Nat Geo); RuPaul's Drag Race: Untucked: "The Daytona Wind 2" – Matthew D. Miller and Kellen Cruden (MTV); Vanderpump Rules: "Lady and the Glamp" – Jesse Friedman, Tom McCudden, Ramin Mortazavi, Christian Le Guilloux, Paul Peltekian, Sax Eno, and Robert Garry (Bravo)

=== Sound Editing ===
Sound Editing
**Outstanding Sound Editing for a Comedy or Drama Series (One Hour)**: **The Last of Us: "When You're Lost in the Darkness" – Michael J. Benavente, Joe Schiff, Christopher Battaglia, Chris Terhune, Mitchell Lestner, Jacob Flack, Matt Yocum, Maarten Hofmeijer, Randy Wilson, Justin Helle, David Aquino, Stefan Fraticelli, Jason Charbonneau, and William Kellerman (HBO)**‡; Andor: "The Eye" – David Acord, Margit Pfeiffer, Richard Quinn, Jonathan Greber, J.R. Grubbs, John Finklea, Shaun Farley, Shelley Roden, and John Roesch (Disney+); The Boys: "The Instant White-Hot Wild" – Wade Barnett, Chris Kahwaty, Ryan Briley, Jeffrey A. Pitts, Pete Nichols, Christopher Brooks, and James Howe (Prime Video); House of the Dragon: "The Black Queen" – Al Sirkett, Tim Hands, Adele Fletcher, Paula Fairfield, David Klotz, Timeri Duplat, Mathias Schuster, Barnaby Smyth, and Paula Boram (HBO); The Lord of the Rings: The Rings of Power: "Udûn" – Robert Stambler, Damian Del Borrello, Ailene Roberts, Stefanie Ng, Paula Fairfield, Chris Terhune, James Miller, Michael Baber, Jason Smith, Amy Barber, and Jonathan Bruce (Prime Video); Stranger Things: "Chapter Nine: The Piggyback" – Craig Henighan, William Files, Jill Purdy, Lee Gilmore, Ryan Cole, Korey Pereira, Angelo Palazzo, Katie Halliday, David Klotz, Lena Glikson-Nezhelskaya, Ken McGill, and Steve Baine (Netflix)	**Outstanding Sound Editing for a Comedy or Drama Series (Half-Hour) and Animation**: **The Bear: "Review" – Steve "Major" Giammaria, Evan Benjamin, Jonathan Fuhrer, Annie Taylor, Chris White, Leslie Bloome, and Shaun Brennan (FX)**‡; Barry: "wow" – Sean Heissinger, Matthew E. Taylor, John Creed, Rickley W. Dumm, Deron Street, Clay Weber, Michael Brake, Darrin Mann, Alyson Dee Moore, and Chris Moriana (HBO); The Mandalorian: "Chapter 24: The Return" – Matthew Wood, Trey Turner, Brad Semenoff, David W. Collins, Luis Galdames, Stephanie McNally, Nicholas Fitzgerald, Joel Raabe, and Shelley Roden (Disney+); Reservation Dogs: "This is Where the Plot Thickens" – Patrick Hogan, David Beadle, Sonya Lindsay, Michael Sana, Daniel Salas, Amber Funk, and Lena Krigen (FX); What We Do in the Shadows: "The Night Market" – Steffan Falesitch, Chris Kahwaty, David Barbee, Steve Griffen, John Guentner, Sam Lewis, and Ellen Heuer (FX)
**Outstanding Sound Editing for a Limited or Anthology Series, Movie or Special**: **Prey – Chris Terhune, William Files, Jessie Anne Spence, James Miller, Diego Perez, Lee Gilmore, Christopher Bonis, Daniel DiPrima, Stephen Perone, Leslie Bloome, and Shaun Brennan (Hulu)**‡; Dahmer – Monster: The Jeffrey Dahmer Story: "God of Forgiveness, God of Vengeance" – Gary Megregian, Borja Sau, Bruce Tanis, David Klotz, Sam Munoz, and Noel Vought (Netflix); Guillermo del Toro's Cabinet of Curiosities: "The Autopsy" – Nelson Ferreira, Jill Purdy, Paul Davies, Bernard O'Reilly, Paul Germann, Tom Jenkins, Robert Hegedus, Rose Gregoris, and Goro Koyama (Netflix); Mrs. Davis: "Mother of Mercy: The Call of the Horse" – Bryan Parker, Kristen Hirlinger, Nathan Efstation, Roland Thai, Matt Decker, Sam Lewis, Sam Munoz, Ellen Heuer, and Nancy Parker (Peacock); Obi-Wan Kenobi: "Part VI" – Matthew Wood, Trey Turner, Angela Ang, Ryan Cota, Jon Borland, Tim Farrell, Michael Levine, Ramiro Belgardt, Nicholas Fitzgerald, Thom Brennan, Ronni Brown, and Sean England (Disney+)	**Outstanding Sound Editing for a Nonfiction or Reality Program (Single or Multi-Camera)**: **Moonage Daydream – John Warhurst, Nina Hartstone, Jens Rosenlund Petersen, Samir Foco, James Shirley, Elliott Koretz, Amy Felton, Louise Burton, and Brett Morgen (HBO)**‡; Love, Lizzo – Vanessa Flores and Jessie Brewer (Max); 100 Foot Wave: "Chapter V – Lost at Sea" – Max Holland, Eric Di Stefano, and Kevin Senzaki (HBO); Still: A Michael J. Fox Movie – Michael Feuser, Rich Bologna, Wyatt Sprague, Heather Gross, and Bill Bernstein (Apple TV+); Welcome to Wrexham: "Do or Die" – Will Harp, Jon Schell, and Shaun Cromwell (FX)

=== Sound Mixing ===
Sound Mixing
**Outstanding Sound Mixing for a Comedy or Drama Series (One Hour)**: **The Last of Us: "When You're Lost in the Darkness" – Marc Fishman, Kevin Roache, and Michael Playfair (HBO)**‡; Better Call Saul: "Saul Gone" – Larry Benjamin, Kevin Valentine, and Phillip W. Palmer (AMC); The Marvelous Mrs. Maisel: "The Testi-Roastial" – Ron Bochar, Mathew Price, Stewart Lerman, and George A. Lara (Prime Video); Stranger Things: "Chapter Nine: The Piggyback" – Craig Henighan, William Files, Mark Paterson, and Michael P. Clark (Netflix); Succession: "Connor's Wedding" – Andy Kris, Nicholas Renbeck, Ken Ishii, and Tommy Vicari (HBO); The White Lotus: "Arrivederci" – Christian Minkler, Ryan Collins, and Vincenzo Urselli (HBO)	**Outstanding Sound Mixing for a Limited or Anthology Series or Movie**: **Daisy Jones & the Six: "Track 10: Rock 'n' Roll Suicide" – Lindsey Alvarez, Mathew Waters, Chris Welcker, and Mike Poole (Prime Video)**‡; Beef: "The Great Fabricator" – Penny Harold, Andrew Garrett Lange, and Sean O'Malley (Netflix); Dahmer – Monster: The Jeffrey Dahmer Story: "Lionel" – Laura Wiest, Jamie Hardt, Joe Barnett, and Amanda Beggs (Netflix); Obi-Wan Kenobi: "Part VI" – Danielle Dupre, Scott Lewis, Bonnie Wild, and Julian Howarth (Disney+); Weird: The Al Yankovic Story – Tony Solis, Richard Bullock, Brian Magrum, and Phil McGowan (The Roku Channel)
**Outstanding Sound Mixing for a Comedy or Drama Series (Half-Hour) and Animation (Area)**: **The Bear: "Review" – Steve "Major" Giammaria and Scott D. Smith (FX)**‡; Barry: "wow" – Elmo Ponsdomenech, Teddy Salas, Scott Harber, and Aaron Hasson (HBO); The Mandalorian: "Chapter 24: The Return" – Scott R. Lewis, Tony Villaflor, Shawn Holden, and Chris Fogel (Disney+); Only Murders in the Building: "The Tell" – Penny Harold, Andrew Lange, Joseph White Jr., and Alan DeMoss (Hulu)	**Outstanding Sound Mixing for a Variety Series or Special (Area)**: **Elton John Live: Farewell from Dodger Stadium – Michael Abbott, Eric Schilling, Matt Herr, and Alan Richardson (Disney+)**‡; Bono & The Edge: A Sort of Homecoming with Dave Letterman – Phil DeTolve, Brian Riordan, and Alastair McMillan (Disney+); The 65th Annual Grammy Awards – Thomas Holmes, John Harris, Eric Schilling, Jeffery Peterson, Ron Reaves, Mike Parker, Andres Arango, Eric Johnston, Christian Schrader, Kristian Pedregon, Juan Pablo Velasco, and Aaron Wall (CBS); Saturday Night Live: "Co-Hosts: Steve Martin & Martin Short" – Robert Palladino, Ezra Matychak, Frank Duca Jr, Caroline Sanchez, Josiah Gluck, Jay Vicari, Tyler McDiarmid, Christopher Costello, Teng Chen, William Taylor, Geoff Countryman, and Devin Emke (NBC); Taylor Hawkins Tribute Concert – Bob Clearmountain, Ollie Nesham, Darrell Thorp, Chris Kalcov, Steve Massey, Eduardo Puhl, Will Langdale, Antony King, and Ian Beveridge (Paramount+)
**Outstanding Sound Mixing for a Nonfiction Program (Single or Multi-Camera) (Area)**: **Moonage Daydream – Paul Massey and David Giammarco (HBO)**‡; 100 Foot Wave: "Chapter V – Lost at Sea" – Keith Hodne (HBO); The Sound of 007 – Richard Davey, Jonny Horne, Simon Norman, and Francesco Corazzi (Prime Video); Stanley Tucci: Searching for Italy: "Calabria" – Matt Skilton and Christopher Syner (CNN); Still: A Michael J. Fox Movie – Skip Lievsay, Benjamin Berger, Martin Kittappa, and Lily van Leeuwen (Apple TV+)	**Outstanding Sound Mixing for a Reality Program (Single or Multi-Camera) (Area)**: **Welcome to Wrexham: "Do or Die" – Mark Jensen (FX)**‡; The Amazing Race: "The Only Leg That Matters" – Jim Ursulak, Troy Smith, and the Production Mixing Team (CBS); Deadliest Catch: "Call of a New Generation" – Jared Robbins (Discovery Channel); RuPaul's Drag Race: "Wigloose: The Rusical!" – Erik Valenzuela, Sal Ojeda, David Nolte, and Gabe Lopez (MTV); The Voice: "Live Top 10" – Michael Abbott, Randy Faustino, and Tim Hatayama (NBC)

=== Special Visual Effects ===
Special Visual Effects
**Outstanding Special Visual Effects in a Season or a Movie**: **The Last of Us – Alex Wang, Sean Nowlan, Joel Whist, Stephen James, Nick Marshall, Simon Jung, Dennis Yoo, Espen Nordahl, and Jonathan Mitchell (HBO)**‡; Andor – Mohen Leo, TJ Falls, Richard Van Den Bergh, Neal Scanlan, Liyana Mansor, Scott Pritchard, Joseph Kasparian, Jelmer Boskma, and Jean-Clément Soret (Disney+); House of the Dragon – Angus Bickerton, Nikeah Forde, Thomas Horton, Sven Martin, Mark Spindler, Mark Dauth, Sebastian Meszmann, Mike Bell, and Tobias Graa Winblad (HBO); The Lord of the Rings: The Rings of Power – Ron Ames, Jason Smith, Nigel Sumner, Ara Khanikian, Dean Clarke, Ken McGaugh, Tom Proctor, Greg Butler, and Joe Henderson (Prime Video); The Mandalorian – Grady Cofer, Abbigail Keller, Paul Kavanagh, Cameron Neilson, Scott Fisher, Hal Hickel, J. Alan Scott, Victor Schutz IV, and Bobo Skipper (Disney+)	**Outstanding Special Visual Effects in a Single Episode (Area)**: **Five Days at Memorial: "Day Two" – Eric Durst, Matthew Whelan, Danny McNair, Goran Pavles, Rafael Solórzano, John MacGillivray, Viktor Muller, Manuel Tausch, and Gonzalo Escudero (Apple TV+)**‡; The Nevers: "It's a Good Day" – Johnny Han, Jack Geist, Damon Fecht, Alexandre Prod'homme, Emanuel Fuchs, Gaia Bussolati, Ed Bruce, Brian Ali Harding, and Takashi Takeoka (Tubi); Shadow and Bone: "Rusalye" – Ante Dekovic, Helen Jen, Richard Macks, Gergely Galisz, Juri Stanossek, Adam Balentine, Jane Byrne, Håvard Munkejord, and Angel Rico (Netflix); Ted Lasso: "Mom City" – James MacLachlan, Bill Parker, Lenny Wilson, Gretchen Bangs, Brian Hobert, Shiying Li, Kenneth Armstrong, Ying Lin, and Neil Taylor (Apple TV+); The Umbrella Academy: "Marigold" – Everett Burrell, Phillip Hoffman, Dave Axford, Maria Sartzetaki, Sophie Vertigan, Jeff Campbell, Laurent Spillemaecker, Chris White, and Ryan Freer (Netflix); Wednesday: "A Murder of Woes" – Tom Turnbull, Kent Johnson, Jesse Kawzenuk, Oana Bardan, Craig Calvert, Ed Englander, John Coldrick, Brodie McNeill, and Jason Troughton (Netflix)

=== Stunts ===
Stunt Coordination
**Outstanding Stunt Coordination for a Comedy Series or Variety Program**: **Barry – Wade Allen (HBO)**‡; Cobra Kai – Ken Barefield (Netflix); Poker Face – Tom Place (Peacock); Tulsa King – Freddie Poole (Paramount+); Wednesday – Brett Chan and Jason Ng (Netflix)	**Outstanding Stunt Coordination for a Drama Series, Limited or Anthology Series or Movie**: **The Boys – John Koyama (Prime Video)**‡; FBI: Most Wanted – Declan Mulvey (CBS); The Mandalorian – JJ Dashnaw (Disney+); The Rookie – David Scott Rowden Sr. (ABC); S.W.A.T. – Austen Brewer and Lance Gilbert (CBS)
**Outstanding Stunt Performance**: **The Mandalorian: "Chapter 24: The Return" – Lateef Crowder, Paul Darnell, JJ Dashnaw, and Ryan Ryusaki (Disney+)**‡; FBI: Most Wanted: "Black Mirror" – Chad Hessler (CBS); Stranger Things: "Chapter Nine: The Piggyback" – Courtney Schwartz and Michelle Andrea Adams (Netflix); Stranger Things: "Chapter Nine: The Piggyback" – Jahnel Curfman, Niko Dalman, and Shannon Beshears (Netflix)

=== Technical Direction ===
Technical Direction
**Outstanding Technical Direction, Camerawork, Video Control for a Series (Area)**: **Dancing with the Stars: "Finale" – Charles Ciup, David Bernstein, Bert Atkinson, Terry Clark, Kary D'Alessandro, James Garcia, Nathanial Havholm, Mark Koonce, Tim Lee, Ron Lehman, Bettina Levesque, Dave Levisohn, Adam Margolis, Derek Pratt, Brian Reason, Philo Solomon, Daryl Studebaker, Marc Stumpo, Damien Tuffereau, and Cary Symmons (Disney+)**‡; American Idol: "Season Finale" – Charles Ciup, David Bernstein, Bert Atkinson, Danny Bonilla, Mike Carr, Kary D'Alessandro, Keith Dicker, Curtis Eastwood, Jimmy Garcia, Bruce Green, Nathanial Havolm, Ron Lehman, Bettina Levesque, Adam Margolis, Rob Palmer, Brian Reason, Daryl Studebaker, Damien Tuffereau, and Easter Xua (ABC); The Masked Singer: "New York Night" – Christine Salomon, Cary Symmons, Bert Atkinson, Brett Crutcher, Kary D'Allesandro, Jimmy Garcia, John Goforth, Sean Flannery, Bettina Levesque, Adam Margolis, Mark Koonce, Daryl Studebaker, James Sullivan, and Rob Palmer (Fox); The Problem with Jon Stewart: "Trump Indicted" – Dave Saretsky, Marc Bloomgarden, Franco Coello, Nick Fayo, Kevin Murphy, John Pry, Tim Quigley, and Rich York (Apple TV+); The Voice: "Live Top 10 Performances" – Allan Wells, Danny Bonilla, Mano Bonilla, Martin J. Brown Jr., Robert Burnette, Suzanne Ebner, Guido Frenzel, Alex Hernandez, Scott Hylton, Kathrine Iacofano, Scott Kaye, Steve Martynuk, Jofre Rosero, Nick Tramontano, and Dann Webb (NBC)	**Outstanding Technical Direction, Camerawork, Video Control for a Special (Area)**: **Elton John Live: Farewell from Dodger Stadium – Emmett Loughran, Robert Del Russo, Mark Britt, David Driscoll, Tim Farmer, Pete Forest, Andrew Georgopoulos, Pat Gleason, Bruce Green, Shaun Harkins, Jay Kulick, Kevin Murphy, Lyn Noland, Jimmy O'Donnell, Rob Palmer, Jesse Placky, David Plakos, George Prince, Mark Renaudin, David Rudd, Austin Rock, Keyan Safyari, Ed Staebler, Rob Vuona, Mark Whitman, Rich York, Jeff Lee, Michael Taylor, Brian Lataille, Loic Maheas, and Chris Schuster (Disney+)**‡; The Apple Music Super Bowl LVII Halftime Show Starring Rihanna – Eric Becker, David Alfano, Rod Wardell, Rob Balton, Danny Bonilla, Kary D'Alessandro, Keith Dicker, Sean Flannery, Kevin French, Shaun Harkins, Helena Jackson, Tayler Knight, Toré Livia, Allen Merriweather, Eann Potter, Jofre Rosero, Keyan Safyari, Casey Roche, and Christopher Rybitski (Fox); Encanto at the Hollywood Bowl – Christine Salomon, Shanele Alvarez, Dominic Bendijo, Bonnie Blake, Danny Bonilla, Kary D'Alessandro, Sean Flannery, Shaun Harkins, Charlie Henry, Cory Hunter, George Reasner, Jofre Rosero, David Rudd, Ryan Schultz, and Aymae Sulick (Disney+); 2022 Rock and Roll Hall of Fame Induction Ceremony – Toby Santos, Danny Bonilla, Kary D'Alessandro, Keith Dicker, Dave Eastwood, Guido Frenzel, Andrew Georgopoulos, Jeff Johnson, Zac Jones, Brian Lataille, Dave Levisohn, Sean Mark Mckelvey, Steve Martyniuk, Rob Palmer, Dave Plakos, Dave Rudd, Dylan Sanford, Matt Trujillo, Roy Walker, Andrew Waruszewski, and Easter Xua (HBO); The Weeknd: Live at SoFi Stadium – Toby Santos, Brandon Smith, Scott Acosta, Dominic Bendijo, Manny Bonilla, Mano Bonilla, Justin Danzansky, Austin Ellsworth, Chris Ferguson, Jeremy Freeman, Andrew Georgopoulos, Randy Gomez, Jonny Harkins, Shaun Harkins, Travis Hays, Coy Hunter, Oliver Lanzenberg, Ron Lehman, Andrew McMillan, Dee Nichols, Connor O'Brien, Josh Perry, Rob Pittman, Keyan Safyari, Daniel Schade, Austin Straub, Josh Turner, Justin Umphenour, Joe Victoria, Vince Warburton, and Drew Welker (HBO)

=== Writing ===
Writing
**Outstanding Writing for a Variety Special**: **John Mulaney: Baby J – John Mulaney (Netflix)**‡; Carol Burnett: 90 Years of Laughter + Love – Jon Macks and Carol Leifer (NBC); Chris Rock: Selective Outrage – Chris Rock (Netflix); Wanda Sykes: I'm an Entertainer – Wanda Sykes (Netflix); Would It Kill You to Laugh? Starring Kate Berlant & John Early – Kate Berlant, Andrew DeYoung, and John Early (Peacock)	**Outstanding Writing for a Nonfiction Program**: **The U.S. and the Holocaust: "Episode 2: Yearning to Breathe Free (1938–1942)" – Geoffrey C. Ward (PBS)**‡; Dear Mama: "Panther Power" – Allen Hughes and Lasse Järvi (FX); Moonage Daydream – Brett Morgen (HBO); 100 Foot Wave: "Chapter V – Lost at Sea" – Zach Rothfeld (HBO); Selena Gomez: My Mind & Me – Alek Keshishian and Paul Marchand (Apple TV+)

=== Nominations and wins by program ===
For the purposes of the lists below, any wins in juried categories are assumed to have a prior nomination.

Shows with multiple Creative Arts nominations
Nominations	Show	Network
19	The Last of Us	HBO
13	Succession	HBO
13	Ted Lasso	Apple TV+
11	The White Lotus	HBO
10	The Marvelous Mrs. Maisel	Prime Video
9	The Mandalorian	Disney+
8	Only Murders in the Building	Hulu
7	The Bear	FX
7	Dahmer – Monster: The Jeffrey Dahmer Story	Netflix
7	Guillermo del Toro's Cabinet of Curiosities	Netflix
7	Saturday Night Live	NBC
7	Still: A Michael J. Fox Movie	Apple TV+
6	Daisy Jones & the Six	Prime Video
6	House of the Dragon	HBO
6	The Lord of the Rings: The Rings of Power	Prime Video
6	100 Foot Wave	HBO
6	Queer Eye	Netflix
6	RuPaul's Drag Race	MTV
6	Stranger Things	Netflix
6	Wednesday	Netflix
6	Weird: The Al Yankovic Story	The Roku Channel
6	Welcome to Wrexham	FX
5	Andor	Disney+
5	Barry	HBO
5	Carol Burnett: 90 Years of Laughter + Love	NBC
5	Moonage Daydream	HBO
4	The Amazing Race	CBS
4	The Apple Music Super Bowl LVII Halftime Show Starring Rihanna	Fox
4	Beauty and the Beast: A 30th Celebration	ABC
4	Beef	Netflix
4	The Crown	Netflix
4	Die Hart 2: Die Harter	The Roku Channel
4	Encanto at the Hollywood Bowl	Disney+
4	Ms. Marvel	Disney+
4	Obi-Wan Kenobi	Disney+
4	Prey	Hulu
4	Stanley Tucci: Searching for Italy	CNN
4	Top Chef	Bravo
4	What We Do in the Shadows	FX
3	Abbott Elementary	ABC
3	Dancing with the Stars	Disney+
3	Deadliest Catch	Discovery Channel
3	Emily in Paris	Netflix
3	The 65th Annual Grammy Awards	CBS
3	Hocus Pocus 2	Disney+
3	How I Met Your Father	Hulu
3	Jeopardy!	ABC / Syndicated
3	The Oscars	ABC
3	Poker Face	Peacock
3	Queen Charlotte: A Bridgerton Story	Netflix
3	2022 Rock and Roll Hall of Fame Induction Ceremony	HBO
3	Schmigadoon!	Apple TV+
3	The 1619 Project	Hulu
3	The Territory	Nat Geo
3	The U.S. and the Holocaust	PBS
3	The Voice	NBC
3	Wanda Sykes: I'm an Entertainer	Netflix
2	A Black Lady Sketch Show	HBO
2	American Idol	ABC
2	Better Call Saul	AMC
2	The Boys	Prime Video
2	Chris Rock: Selective Outrage	Netflix
2	Dear Mama	FX
2	Dolly Parton's Mountain Magic Christmas	NBC
2	Elton John Live: Farewell from Dodger Stadium	Disney+
2	Entergalactic	Netflix
2	Family Feud	ABC / Syndicated
2	FBI: Most Wanted	CBS
2	Fleishman Is in Trouble	FX
2	George & Tammy	Showtime
2	Grease: Rise of the Pink Ladies	Paramount+
2	History of the World, Part II	Hulu
2	I Think You Should Leave with Tim Robinson	Netflix
2	John Mulaney: Baby J	Netflix
2	Judy Blume Forever	Prime Video
2	Last Week Tonight with John Oliver	HBO
2	Life Below Zero	Nat Geo
2	Love Is Blind	Netflix
2	Pamela, a Love Story	Netflix
2	Perry Mason	HBO
2	Pretty Baby: Brooke Shields	Hulu
2	The Problem with Jon Stewart	Apple TV+
2	RuPaul's Drag Race: Untucked	MTV
2	Secrets of the Elephants	Nat Geo
2	The Simpsons	Fox
2	Star Trek: Picard	Paramount+
2	Survivor	CBS
2	The Upshaws	Netflix
2	Vanderpump Rules	Bravo
2	The Weeknd: Live at SoFi Stadium	HBO
2	We're Here	HBO
2	Wheel of Fortune	Syndicated

Shows with multiple Creative Arts wins
Wins	Show	Network
8	The Last of Us	HBO
5	Welcome to Wrexham	FX
4	The Bear	FX
4	Still: A Michael J. Fox Movie	Apple TV+
4	Wednesday	Netflix
4	The White Lotus	HBO
3	Beef	Netflix
3	Dancing with the Stars	Disney+
2	The Apple Music Super Bowl LVII Halftime Show Starring Rihanna	Fox
2	Beauty and the Beast: A 30th Celebration	ABC
2	Daisy Jones & the Six	Prime Video
2	Elton John Live: Farewell from Dodger Stadium	Disney+
2	I Think You Should Leave with Tim Robinson	Netflix
2	The Marvelous Mrs. Maisel	Prime Video
2	Moonage Daydream	HBO
2	RuPaul's Drag Race	MTV
2	Saturday Night Live	NBC
2	The Simpsons	Fox
2	Ted Lasso	Apple TV+
2	We're Here	HBO
2	Weird: The Al Yankovic Story	The Roku Channel

=== Nominations and wins by network ===
Networks with multiple Creative Arts nominations
Nominations	Network
86	HBO / Max
81	Netflix
37	Disney+
34	Apple TV+
33	Prime Video
29	Hulu
25	FX
22	NBC
21	ABC
15	CBS
11	Fox
10	The Roku Channel
8	MTV
8	Nat Geo
8	Paramount+
7	CNN
7	Peacock
7	Syndicated
6	Bravo
6	PBS
4	Showtime
3	Adult Swim
3	Comedy Central
3	AMC
3	Discovery Channel
2	Apple
2	Max

Networks with multiple Creative Arts wins
Wins	Network
22	HBO
16	Netflix
10	FX
9	Apple TV+
8	Disney+
6	Prime Video
5	NBC
4	Fox
4	Hulu
3	ABC
2	MTV
2	PBS
2	Peacock
2	The Roku Channel

== Ceremony order and presenters ==
Presenters on Saturday, January 6
Category	Presenter(s)
Outstanding Guest Actor in a Comedy Series	Murray Bartlett Nick Offerman
Outstanding Choreography for Scripted Programming	Murray Bartlett Nick Offerman
Outstanding Casting for a Drama Series	Cynthia Addai-Robinson
Outstanding Casting for a Limited or Anthology Series or Movie	Cynthia Addai-Robinson
Outstanding Casting for a Comedy Series	Cynthia Addai-Robinson
Outstanding Period Costumes for a Series	Joel Kim Booster
Outstanding Period Costumes for a Limited or Anthology Series or Movie	Joel Kim Booster
Outstanding Fantasy/Sci-Fi Costumes	Joel Kim Booster
Outstanding Contemporary Costumes for a Series	Cristo Fernández Karen Pittman
Outstanding Contemporary Costumes for a Limited or Anthology Series or Movie	Cristo Fernández Karen Pittman
Outstanding Prosthetic Makeup	Beatrice Grannò Simona Tabasco
Outstanding Contemporary Makeup (Non-Prosthetic)	Beatrice Grannò Simona Tabasco
Outstanding Period and/or Character Makeup (Non-Prosthetic)	Beatrice Grannò Simona Tabasco
Outstanding Guest Actress in a Comedy Series	Aja Naomi King Lewis Pullman
Outstanding Period and/or Character Hairstyling	Aja Naomi King Lewis Pullman
Outstanding Contemporary Hairstyling	Aja Naomi King Lewis Pullman
Outstanding Stunt Coordination for a Drama Series, Limited or Anthology Series or Movie	J. Smith-Cameron Arian Moayed
Outstanding Stunt Coordination for a Comedy Series or Variety Program	J. Smith-Cameron Arian Moayed
Primetime Emmy Award for Outstanding Stunt Performance	J. Smith-Cameron Arian Moayed
Outstanding Production Design for a Narrative Program (Half-Hour)	Storm Reid
Outstanding Production Design for a Narrative Contemporary Program (One Hour or More)	Storm Reid
Outstanding Production Design for a Narrative Period or Fantasy Program (One Hour or More)	Storm Reid
Outstanding Special Visual Effects in a Season or a Movie	Christa Miller
Outstanding Special Visual Effects in a Single Episode	Christa Miller
Outstanding Main Title Design	Christa Miller
Outstanding Motion Design	Christa Miller
Outstanding Sound Editing for a Limited or Anthology Series, Movie or Special	Chris Perfetti Lisa Ann Walter
Outstanding Sound Editing for a Comedy or Drama Series (Half-Hour) and Animation	Chris Perfetti Lisa Ann Walter
Outstanding Sound Editing for a Comedy or Drama Series (One-Hour)	Chris Perfetti Lisa Ann Walter
Outstanding Sound Mixing for a Comedy or Drama Series (One-Hour)	Jeremy Sisto
Outstanding Sound Mixing for a Comedy or Drama Series (Half-Hour) and Animation	Jeremy Sisto
Outstanding Sound Mixing for a Limited or Anthology Series or Movie	Jeremy Sisto
Outstanding Music Composition for a Limited or Anthology Series, Movie or Special (Original Dramatic Score)	Craig Robinson
Outstanding Music Supervision	Craig Robinson
Outstanding Music and Lyrics	Craig Robinson
In Memoriam segment	Not applicable
Outstanding Actor in a Short Form Comedy or Drama Series	Bruce Greenwood Carla Gugino
Outstanding Music Composition for a Series (Original Dramatic Score)	Bruce Greenwood Carla Gugino
Primetime Emmy Award for Outstanding Original Main Title Theme Music	Bruce Greenwood Carla Gugino
Outstanding Actress in a Short Form Comedy or Drama Series	Melanie Lynskey
Outstanding Picture Editing for a Multi-Camera Comedy Series	Melanie Lynskey
Outstanding Picture Editing for a Single-Camera Comedy Series	Kiersey Clemons Devery Jacobs
Outstanding Picture Editing for a Limited or Anthology Series or Movie	Kiersey Clemons Devery Jacobs
Outstanding Picture Editing for a Drama Series	Kiersey Clemons Devery Jacobs
Outstanding Cinematography for a Series (One Hour)	Rhys Darby
Outstanding Cinematography for a Series (Half-Hour)	Rhys Darby
Outstanding Cinematography for a Limited or Anthology Series or Movie	Rhys Darby
Outstanding Guest Actress in a Drama Series	Ernie Hudson
Outstanding Guest Actor in a Drama Series	Ernie Hudson
Outstanding Television Movie	Ernie Hudson

Presenters on Sunday, January 7
Category	Presenter(s)
Outstanding Short Form Comedy, Drama or Variety Series	Jeff Probst
Outstanding Short Form Nonfiction or Reality Series	Jeff Probst
Outstanding Picture Editing for Variety Programming	Derek Hough Julianne Hough
Outstanding Directing for a Variety Series	Derek Hough Julianne Hough
Outstanding Directing for a Variety Special	Derek Hough Julianne Hough
Outstanding Lighting Design / Lighting Direction for a Variety Special	Kate Berlant John Early
Outstanding Lighting Design / Lighting Direction for a Variety Series	Kate Berlant John Early
Outstanding Individual Achievement in Animation	Kate Berlant John Early
Outstanding Commercial	Adam Blackstone Rickey Minor
Outstanding Narrator	Adam Blackstone Rickey Minor
Outstanding Cinematography for a Nonfiction Program	Lala Kent Tom Sandoval Tom Schwartz Scheana Shay
Outstanding Cinematography for a Reality Program	Lala Kent Tom Sandoval Tom Schwartz Scheana Shay
Outstanding Choreography for Variety or Reality Programming	Lala Kent Tom Sandoval Tom Schwartz Scheana Shay
Outstanding Production Design for a Variety Special	Lori Greiner
Outstanding Production Design for a Variety or Reality Series	Lori Greiner
Outstanding Costumes for a Variety, Nonfiction, or Reality Programming	Lori Greiner
Outstanding Unstructured Reality Program	Alan Tudyk
Outstanding Structured Reality Program	Alan Tudyk
Outstanding Directing for a Reality Program	Alan Tudyk
Outstanding Picture Editing for a Structured Reality or Competition Program	Duff Goldman
Outstanding Picture Editing for an Unstructured Reality Program	Duff Goldman
Outstanding Casting for a Reality Program	Duff Goldman
Outstanding Writing for a Variety Special	Nikki Glaser
Outstanding Makeup for a Variety, Nonfiction or Reality Program	Nikki Glaser
Outstanding Casting for a Reality Program	Nikki Glaser
Outstanding Game Show	Chelsea Lazkani Amanda Smith Chrishell Stause Bre Tiesi
Outstanding Host for a Game Show	Chelsea Lazkani Amanda Smith Chrishell Stause Bre Tiesi
Outstanding Hairstyling for a Variety, Nonfiction or Reality Program	Chelsea Lazkani Amanda Smith Chrishell Stause Bre Tiesi
Outstanding Host for a Reality or Reality Competition Program	Lisa Vanderpump
Outstanding Sound Mixing for a Reality Program (Single or Multi-Camera)	Lisa Vanderpump
Outstanding Sound Mixing for a Variety Series or Special	John Walsh
Outstanding Sound Mixing for a Nonfiction Program (Single or Multi-Camera)	John Walsh
Outstanding Sound Editing for a Nonfiction or Reality Program (Single or Multi-Camera)	John Walsh
In Memoriam segment	Not applicable
Outstanding Music Composition for a Documentary Series or Special (Original Dramatic Score)	Kid Cudi
Outstanding Music Direction	Kid Cudi
Outstanding Hosted Nonfiction Series or Special	Kid Cudi
Outstanding Documentary or Nonfiction Special	Donald Faison Abigail Spencer
Outstanding Documentary or Nonfiction Series	Donald Faison Abigail Spencer
Exceptional Merit in Documentary Filmmaking	Donald Faison Abigail Spencer
Outstanding Writing for a Nonfiction Programming	Robin Thede
Outstanding Picture Editing for a Nonfiction Program	Robin Thede
Outstanding Directing for a Documentary/Nonfiction Program	Robin Thede
Outstanding Animated Program	Brie Bella Nikki Garcia
Outstanding Character Voice-Over Performance	Brie Bella Nikki Garcia
Outstanding Emerging Media Program	Brie Bella Nikki Garcia
Outstanding Technical Direction and Camerawork for a Series	Rhett McLaughlin Rhett & Link
Outstanding Technical Direction and Camerawork for a Special	Rhett McLaughlin Rhett & Link
Outstanding Variety Special (Pre-Recorded)	Padma Lakshmi

== Ceremony information ==
The 75th Primetime Creative Arts Emmy Awards were executive produced by Bob Bain and directed by Richard Preuss. Nominations were announced on July 12, 2023. Originally, the Academy of Television Arts & Sciences announced that the 75th Primetime Creative Arts Emmy Awards would be held on September 9 and 10, leading into the 75th Primetime Emmy Awards on September 18. However, the ceremonies were postponed to January 6 and 7, 2024 due to the 2023 Hollywood labor disputes. The first night of awards focused on scripted programming, while the second night focused on variety, non-fiction, and reality programming. The combined ceremonies aired in an edited two-hour broadcast on January 13 on FXX.

=== Category changes ===
Changes for the Creative Arts categories this year included:

- The categories for Single-Camera and Multi-Camera Picture Editing for a Comedy Series were combined into Outstanding Picture Editing for a Comedy Series. Likewise, Cinematography for a Single-Camera Series (Half-Hour) and Multi-Camera Series were combined into Outstanding Cinematography for a Series (Half-Hour). However, categories with tracks for different types of programming, such as the two new categories, could be split if there were at least 20 nominees for each track.
- Line producers became eligible for the categories of Outstanding Talk Series, Outstanding Scripted Variety Series, Outstanding Variety Special (Live) and Outstanding Variety Special (Pre-Recorded).
- Two categories were created to recognize emerging media programming:
  - Outstanding Innovation in Emerging Media Programming, a juried award, recognizes the "producer(s), company(s), and/or individual(s) responsible for the creation of groundbreaking emerging media programming that demonstrates technical or storytelling innovation, significantly elevating the audience's viewing experience beyond traditional linear TV programming".
  - Outstanding Emerging Media Program recognizes the "producer(s), company(s), and/or individual(s) responsible for the creation of emerging media programming related to an existing linear television program or series or one that is entirely original".
- Documentary programs that were submitted to the Academy of Motion Picture Arts and Sciences viewing platform but received no Academy Award nominations were eligible for Emmy consideration.

In addition, several categories were moved between the main and Creative Arts broadcasts. Outstanding Writing for a Variety Special was moved to the Creative Arts Award ceremony while Outstanding Variety Special (Live) was presented on the main broadcast.
