= Wigloose: The Rusical! =

- RuPaul's Drag Race episode
- Scene from the episode of contestants performing in a Rusical (musical theatre production) based on the film Footloose
- Episode no.: Season 15; Episode 12
- Original air date: March 17, 2023

Guest appearances
- Orville Peck (guest judge); Miguel Zarate

Episode chronology
← Previous "Two Queens, One Joke"	Next → "Teacher Makeovers"
- RuPaul's Drag Race season 15

"Wigloose: The Rusical!" is the twelfth episode of the fifteenth season of the American television series RuPaul's Drag Race, which aired on MTV on March 17, 2023. The episode's main challenge tasks the contestants with performing in a Rusical (musical theatre production) based on the American film Footloose (1984). Country musician Orville Peck is a guest judge. Salina EsTitties is eliminated from the competition after placing in the bottom two and losing a lip-sync contest against Loosey LaDuca to "Running Up That Hill" by Kate Bush.

The episode won one award from three nominations at the 75th Primetime Creative Arts Emmy Awards. It won in the Outstanding Picture Editing for a Structured Reality or Competition Program category and was nominated in the categories Outstanding Directing for a Reality Program and Outstanding Sound Mixing for a Nonfiction Program.

== Episode ==
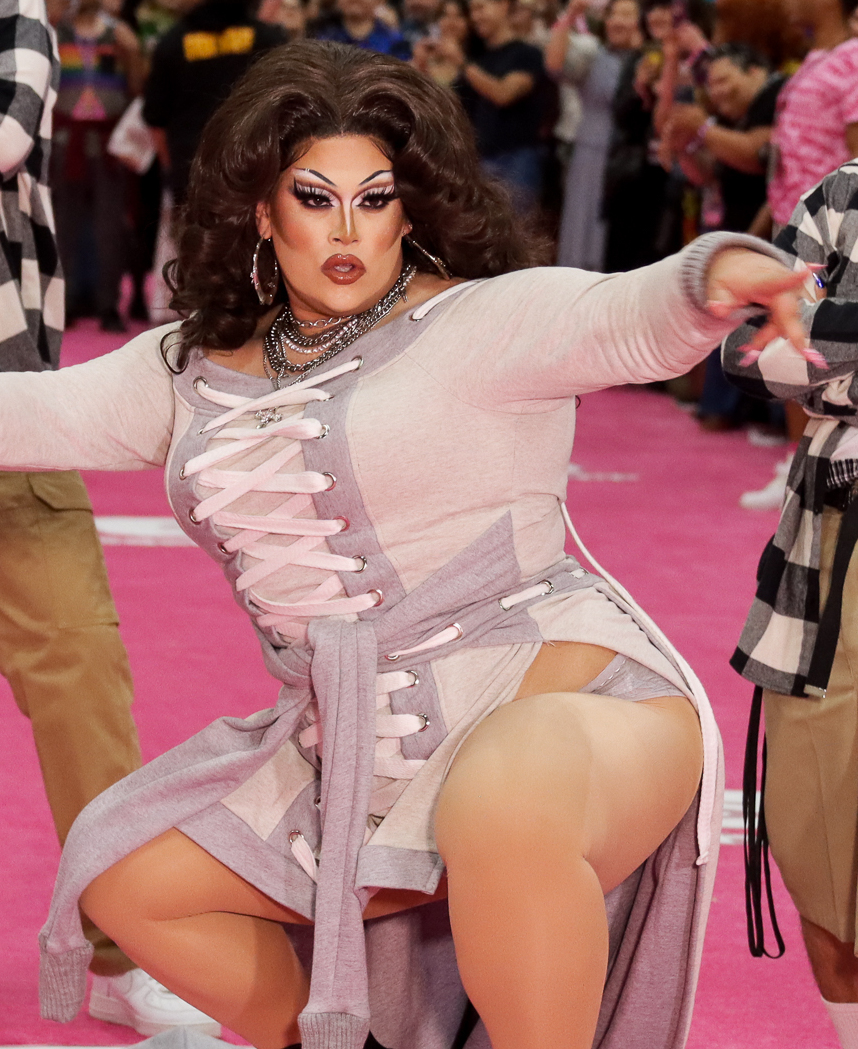
Salina EsTitties (pictured in 2023) is eliminated from the competition.

The remaining contestants return to the Werk Room after Marcia Marcia Marcia's elimination on the previous episode, then get out of drag. On a new day, RuPaul greets the group and reveals the main challenge, which tasks contestants with performing a Rusical parody tribute to the film Footloose. The musical, Wigloose, is set in a small fictional town that has outlawed drag, during the 1980s. The contestants decide on which roles to play. Loosey LaDuca and Luxx Noir London fight for the lead role. The contestants decide on the following cast:

- Loosey LaDuca as teenage drag queen Heaven Bacon (Ren McCormack)
- Anetra as Heaven Bacon's mother Mama Bacon (Ethel McCormack)
- Mistress Isabelle Brooks as "narrow minded" Preacher Teacher (Rev. Shaw Moore)
- Luxx Noir London as Christian
- Salina EsTitties as Tuck
- Sasha Colby as "obedient" husband Carl (Vi Moore)

In the Werk Room, the contestants begin to prepare for the musical. RuPaul meets with the contestants individually to ask questions and offer advice. Sasha Colby shares that she no longer has a relationship with her mother, who did not accept her gender transition. Anetra describes what drag means to her. The contestants rehearse choreography with Miguel Zarate on the main stage. Back in the Werk Room, the contestants talk about the state of drag in society, including protests targeting Drag Queen Story Hour. They discuss politics and the role of drag within the community.

On the main stage, RuPaul welcomes fellow judges Michelle Visage and Ross Mathews, as well as guest judge Orville Peck. The contestants perform the musical for the judges. RuPaul reveals the runway category ("Everybody Say Glove"), then the contestants present their looks. The judges deliver their critiques, deliberate, then share the results with the group. Anetra is declared the winner of the main challenge. Loosey LaDuca and Salina EsTitties place in the bottom two and face off in a lip-sync contest to "Running Up That Hill" (1985) by Kate Bush. Loosey LaDuca wins the lip-sync and Salina EsTitties is eliminated from the competition. Salina EsTitties returns to the Werk Room to write a message on the mirror with lipstick.

== Production and broadcast ==
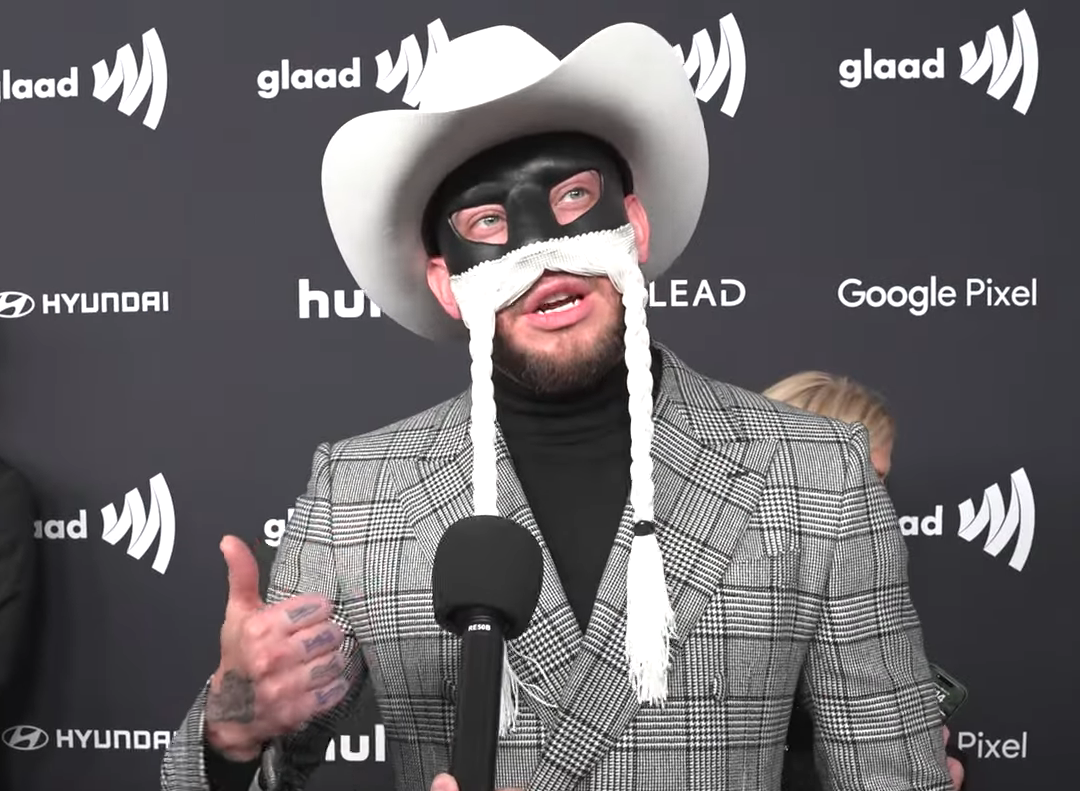
Orville Peck (pictured in 2024) is a guest judge.

The musical is set in the fictional town of West Bumtuck. Leland wrote the lyrics.

The episode originally aired on March 17, 2023. According to Pride.com, "Even though it was filmed in 2022, the episode ended up airing at a crucial time as anti-LGBTQ+ legislation started to sweep the nation, with many bills targeting transgender people and drag queens." Also commenting on the episode's timing, Stephen Daw of Billboard wrote, "What could have once been a cute reinterpretation of the 1984 classic Footloose became an emotive, poignant show that seemed to eerily comment on the bleak state of affairs for drag queens around the U.S. Filmed in 2022 before controversial 'drag bans' began sweeping the country, the show centers around a small town that attempts to ban the art of drag and is thwarted by a community of expressive queens." Katie Campione of Deadline Hollywood said, "what started as a [parody] would transform into a timely commentary as anti-drag legislation began to pop up in state legislatures across the country".

=== Fashion ===
For the judging panel, RuPaul wears an orange-and-pink outfit, with large orange earrings and a blonde wig. For the fashion show, Loosey LaDuca wears a green outfit inspired by the creature from the black lagoon. She has webbed fingers under her matching green gloves. Anetra presents a rave-inspired blue outfit with matching leather gloves. She wears a blue wig. Mistress Isabelle Brooks wears a yellow dress and a blonde wig. She carries long jewels. Luxx Noir London's outfit is black, red, and white. She wears a cast on her arm, which she had her friends sign. Salina EsTitties has oversized gloves. Sasha Colby presents an outfit inspired by baseball.

== Reception ==
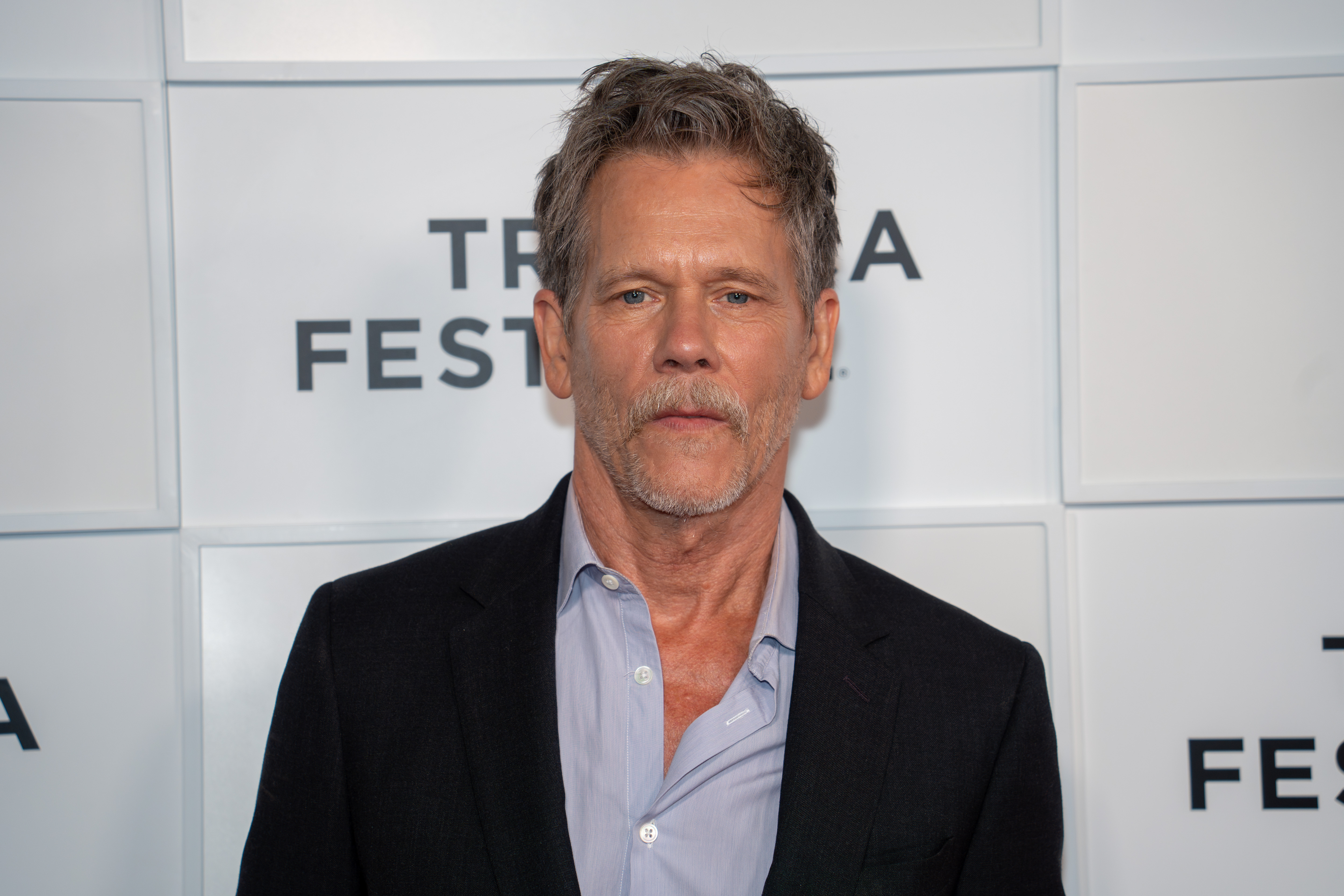
American actor Kevin Bacon (pictured in 2025), who starred in the 1984 film Footloose, praised the episode on social media.

Trae DeLellis of The A.V. Club gave the episode a rating of 'A'. Jason P. Frank of Vulture rated the episode 4 out of 5 stars. Charlie Duncan of PinkNews wrote, "Drag Race enters its final five with a Rusical that has better production value than most Broadway shows and a very important political message, as tensions between the queens edge ever closer to breaking point." Stephen Daw ranked "Running Up That Hill" number 16 in Billboard's list of the season's lip-sync performances, writing: "Yes, objectively speaking, this was a very bad lip sync — Loosey and Salina tried “Running Up That Hill” and instead came tumbling down it. But sometimes, a performance can be so bad that it transcends objectivity and becomes compelling again, and that's what ended up happening here." He continued, "A lip sync is meant to entertain, and watching a very sad sea monster and a hot-dog-fingered abstract painting try to convey the complicated emotions of Kate Bush's classic single turned out to be very entertaining, indeed."

American actor Kevin Bacon praised the musical on social media. The episode won one award from three nominations at the 75th Primetime Creative Arts Emmy Awards. Jamie Martin, Paul Cross, Ryan Mallick, and Michael Roha won in the Outstanding Picture Editing for a Structured Reality or Competition Program category. Nick Murray was nominated in the Outstanding Directing for a Reality Program category and Erik Valenzuela, Sal Ojeda, David Nolte, and Gabe Lopez were nominated in the Outstanding Sound Mixing for a Nonfiction Program category.

== See also ==
- 2020s anti-LGBTQ movement in the United States
- Drag panic
