= Primetime Emmy Award for Outstanding Casting for a Reality Program =

Television award category

- Awarded for: Outstanding Casting for a Reality Program
- Country: United States
- Presented by: Academy of Television Arts & Sciences
- Currently held by: Love on the Spectrum (2026)
- Website: emmys.com

This is a list of the winners and nominations for the Primetime Emmy Award for Outstanding Casting for a Reality Program. The award was instituted in 2017 and recognizes casting for reality-competition, structured and unstructured reality programs.

== Winners and nominations ==
=== 2010s ===
Year	Program	Casting	Network
2017 (69th)
2017 (69th)	Born This Way (Seasons 2-3: Part 1)	Sasha Alpert and Megan Sleeper – casting by	A&E
2017 (69th)	Project Runway (Season 15)	Sasha Alpert, Alissa Haight Carlton and Jen DeMartino – casting by	Lifetime
2017 (69th)	RuPaul's Drag Race (Season 9)	Goloka Bolte and Ethan Petersen – casting by	VH1
2017 (69th)	Survivor (Seasons 33-34)	Lynne Spiegel Spillman – casting by	CBS
2017 (69th)	The Voice (Seasons 11-12)	Michelle McNulty, Holly Dale and Courtney Burns – casting by	NBC
2018 (70th)
2018 (70th)	Queer Eye (Season 1)	Ally Capriotti Grant – casting by; Beyhan Oguz – director of casting and talent; Gretchen Palek – SVP of casting and talent; Danielle Gervais – VP of casting and talent	Netflix
2018 (70th)	Born This Way (Season 3: Part 2)	Sasha Alpert – supervising casting producer; Megan Sleeper – casting producer; Caitlyn Audet – senior casting coordinator	A&E
2018 (70th)	Project Runway (Season 16)	Sasha Alpert – casting producer; Alissa Haight Carlton – supervising casting director; Jen DeMartino and Rebecca Snavely – senior casting directors	Lifetime
2018 (70th)	RuPaul's Drag Race (Season 10)	Goloka Bolte and Ethan Petersen – casting directors	VH1
2018 (70th)	The Voice (Seasons 13-14)	Michelle McNulty, Holly Dale and Courtney Burns – casting by	NBC
2019 (71st)
2019 (71st)	Queer Eye (Seasons 2-3)	Gretchen Palek – SVP of casting and talent; Danielle Gervais – VP of casting and talent; Quinn Fegan — casting producer; Ally Capriotti Grant and Pamela Vallarelli – location casting directors	Netflix
2019 (71st)	Born This Way (Season 4)	Sasha Alpert – supervising casting producer; Megan Sleeper – casting producer; Caitlyn Audet – senior casting coordinator	A&E
2019 (71st)	RuPaul's Drag Race (Season 11)	Goloka Bolte and Ethan Petersen – casting directors	VH1
2019 (71st)	Shark Tank (Season 10)	Mindy Zemrak – supervising casting producer; Jen Rosen – casting manager	ABC
2019 (71st)	The Voice (Seasons 15-16)	Michelle McNulty — supervising casting producer, Holly Dale — senior casting producer; Courtney Burns – casting producer	NBC

=== 2020s ===
Year	Program	Casting	Network
2020 (72nd)
2020 (72nd)	RuPaul's Drag Race (Season 12)	Goloka Bolte and Ethan Petersen – casting directors	VH1
2020 (72nd)	Born This Way (Moving Forward)	Sasha Alpert – supervising casting producer; Megan Sleeper – casting producer; Caitlyn Audet – senior casting coordinator	A&E
2020 (72nd)	Love Is Blind (Season 1)	Donna Driscoll - VP of Casting, Kelly Zack Castillo - Lead Casting Producer and Megan Feldman – Casting Manager	Netflix
2020 (72nd)	Queer Eye (Season 4)	Danielle Gervais, Beyhan Oguz and Pamela Vallarelli – casting directors; Ally Capriotti Grant and Hana Sakata – location casting directors	Netflix
2020 (72nd)	The Voice (Seasons 17-18)	Michelle McNulty — supervising casting producer, Holly Dale — senior casting producer; Courtney Burns – casting producer	NBC
2021 (73rd)
2021 (73rd)	RuPaul's Drag Race (Season 13)	Goloka Bolte and Ethan Petersen – casting directors	VH1
2021 (73rd)	Queer Eye (Season 5)	Danielle Gervais, Natalie Pino and MaryAnne Nicoletti – casting directors; Pamela Vallarelli and Ally Capriotti Grant – location casting directors	Netflix
2021 (73rd)	Shark Tank (Season 12)	Mindy Zemrak, Jen Rosen and Erica Brooks Hochberg - casting directors	ABC
2021 (73rd)	Top Chef (Season 18)	Ron Mare – casting director	Bravo
2021 (73rd)	The Voice (Seasons 19-20)	Michelle McNulty, Holly Dale and Courtney Burns – casting directors	NBC
2022 (74th)
2022 (74th)	Love on the Spectrum U.S. (Season 1)	Laura Ritchie, Kat Elmore and Jeffrey Marx - casting directors	Netflix
2022 (74th)	Lizzo's Watch Out for the Big Grrrls (Season 1)	Lynne Spillman, Blair Kim and Jazzy Collins – casting directors	Prime Video
2022 (74th)	Queer Eye (Season 6)	Danielle Gervais, Jessica Jorgensen and Natalie Pino – casting directors	Netflix
2022 (74th)	RuPaul's Drag Race (Season 14)	Goloka Bolte and Ethan Petersen – casting directors	VH1
2022 (74th)	Top Chef (Season 19)	Samantha Hanks and Ron Mare – casting directors	Bravo
2023 (75th)
2023 (75th)	The Traitors (Season 1)	Erin Tomasello, Jazzy Collins, Moira Paris and Holly Osifat – casting directors	Peacock
2023 (75th)	Love Is Blind (Seasons 3-4)	Donna Driscoll, Stephanie Lewis and Claire Loeb – casting directors	Netflix
2023 (75th)	Queer Eye (Season 7)	Quinn Fegan, Jessica Jorgensen, Keya Mason and Lauren Levine – casting directors	Netflix
2023 (75th)	RuPaul's Drag Race (Season 15)	Goloka Bolte, Ethan Petersen, Adam Cook and Michelle Redwine – casting directors	MTV
2023 (75th)	Top Chef (Season 20)	Ron Mare, Sena Rich and Erinlee Skilton – casting directors	Bravo
2024 (76th)
2024 (76th)	Love on the Spectrum U.S. (Season 2)	Cian O'Clery, Sean Bowman, Marina Nieto Ritger and Emma Choate – casting directors	Netflix
2024 (76th)	The Amazing Race (Seasons 35-36)	Jesse Tannenbaum, Alex Stern, Pollyanna Jacobs and Pedro Gomez – casting directors	CBS
2024 (76th)	The Golden Bachelor (Season 1)	Jacqui Pitman, John Kennamann and Lindsay Liles – casting directors	ABC
2024 (76th)	RuPaul's Drag Race (Season 16)	Goloka Bolte, Ethan Petersen, Adam Cook and Michelle Redwine – casting directors	MTV
2024 (76th)	Squid Game: The Challenge (Season 1)	Rachael Stubbins, Emma Shearer, Robyn Kass and Erika Dobrin – casting directors	Netflix
2025 (77th)
2025 (77th)	Love on the Spectrum (Season 3)	Cian O'Clery, Sean Bowman and Emma Choate – casting directors	Netflix
2025 (77th)	The Amazing Race (Season 37)	Jesse Tannenbaum, Alex Stiner, Kayla Kellerbauer, Pollyanna Jacobs and Pedro Gomez – casting directors	CBS
2025 (77th)	Queer Eye (Season 9)	Danielle Gervais, Jessica Jorgensen, Natalie Pino and Brian Puentes – casting directors	Netflix
2025 (77th)	RuPaul's Drag Race (Season 17)	Goloka Bolte, Adam Cook and Michelle Redwine – casting directors	MTV
2025 (77th)	Survivor (Seasons 47-48)	Jesse Tannenbaum, Caitlin Moore, Penni Lane Clifton, Daniel Gradias, Lisa Visagie and Christian Estrada – casting directors	CBS
2026 (78th)
2026 (78th)	Love on the Spectrum (Season 4)	Cian O'Clery, Sean Bowman, Ashley Morgan and Emily Frisbie – casting directors	Netflix
2026 (78th)	The Amazing Race (Season 38)	Jesse Tannenbaum, Kayla Kellerbauer and Alex Stiner – casting directors	CBS
2026 (78th)	RuPaul's Drag Race (Season 18)	Goloka Bolte, Adam Cook and Michelle Redwine – casting directors	MTV
2026 (78th)	Survivor (Seasons 49-50)	Jesse Tannenbaum, Penni Lane Clifton, Caitlin Moore and Heidi Hill – casting directors	CBS
2026 (78th)	Top Chef (Season 23)	Ron Mare, Heather Allyn, Joy Barrett, Anna Sturgeon and Sena Rich – casting directors	Bravo

== Programs with multiple wins ==
4 wins

- Love on the Spectrum (3 consecutive)

2 wins

- Queer Eye
- RuPaul's Drag Race

== Casting directors with multiple awards ==
3 awards

- Sean Bowman (3 consecutive)
- Cian O'Clery (3 consecutive)

2 awards

- Goloka Bolte (2 consecutive)
- Emma Choate (2 consecutive)
- Danielle Gervais (2 consecutive)
- Ally Capriotti Grant (2 consecutive)
- Gretchen Palek (2 consecutive)
- Ethan Petersen (2 consecutive)

== Programs with multiple nominations ==
10 nominations

- RuPaul's Drag Race

7 nominations

- Queer Eye

5 nominations

- The Voice

4 nominations

- Born This Way
- Love on the Spectrum
- Top Chef

3 nominations

- The Amazing Race
- Survivor

2 nominations

- Love Is Blind
- Project Runway
- Shark Tank

== Total awards by network ==
- Netflix - 5
- VH1 – 2
- A&E / Peacock - 1

== Casting directors with multiple nominations ==
10 nominations

- Goloka Bolte

8 nominations

- Ethan Petersen

5 nominations

- Danielle Gervais
- Jesse Tannenbaum

4 nominations

- Sasha Alpert
- Courtney Burns
- Adam Cook
- Holly Dale
- Ally Capriotti Grant
- Ron Mare
- Michelle McNulty
- Michelle Redwine
- Megan Sleeper
- Pamela Vallarelli

3 nominations

- Caitlyn Audet
- Sean Bowman
- Quinn Fegan
- Jessica Jorgensen
- Cian O'Clery
- Natalie Pino

2 nominations

- Emma Choate
- Jazzy Collins
- Adam Cook
- Donna Driscoll
- Jessica Jorgensen
- Samantha Hanks
- Jessica Jorgensen
- Beyhan Oguz
- Gretchen Palek
- Michelle Redwine
- Jen Rosen
- Lynne Spillman
- Mindy Zemrak
- Beyhan Oguz
