= Primetime Emmy Award for Outstanding Directing for a Reality Program =

Television award category

- Awarded for: Outstanding Directing for a Reality Program
- Country: United States
- Presented by: Academy of Television Arts & Sciences
- Currently held by: Ben Archard, The Traitors (2026)
- Website: emmys.com

The Primetime Emmy Award for Outstanding Directing for a Reality Program is awarded to one program each year. The category was created in 2018. Between 2003 and 2017, reality and documentary/nonfiction programs competed in a combined category.

In the following list, the first titles listed in gold are the winners; those not in gold are nominees, which are listed in alphabetical order. The years given are those in which the ceremonies took place:

== Winners and nominations ==
=== 2000s ===
Year	Program	Episode	Nominee(s)	Network
2003	Outstanding Directing for Nonfiction Programming			
2003	American Experience	"The Murder of Emmett Till"	Stanley Nelson Jr.	PBS
2003	American Idol	"Finale"	Bruce Gowers	Fox
2003	Da Ali G Show	"Politics"	James Bobin	HBO
2003	Expedition: Bismarck		Andrew Wight and James Cameron	Discovery
2003	Journeys with George		Alexandra Pelosi and Aaron Lubarsky	HBO
2003	Unchained Memories: Readings from the Slave Narratives		Ed Bell and Thomas Lennon	HBO
2004
2004	Jockey		Kate Davis	HBO
2004	American Experience	"Tupperware!"	Laurie Kahn	PBS
2004	American Masters	"Judy Garland: By Myself"	Susan Lacy	PBS
2004	Born Rich		Jamie Johnson	HBO
2004	Queer Eye for the Straight Guy	"Richard Miller"	Becky Smith	Bravo
2005
2005	Death in Gaza		James Miller (posthumously)	HBO
2005	American Idol	"Finale"	Bruce Gowers	Fox
2005	The Apprentice	"Finale"	Glenn Weiss	NBC
2005	Extreme Makeover: Home Edition	"The Dore Family"	Patrick Higgins	ABC
2005	Unforgivable Blackness: The Rise and Fall of Jack Johnson		Ken Burns	PBS
2006
2006	Baghdad ER		Jon Alpert and Matthew O'Neill	HBO
2006	All Aboard! Rosie's Family Cruise		Shari Cookson	HBO
2006	American Masters	"John Ford/John Wayne: The Filmmaker and the Legend"	Samuel D. Pollard	PBS
2006	American Masters	"No Direction Home: Bob Dylan"	Martin Scorsese	PBS
2006	Children of Beslan		Ewa Ewart and Leslie Woodhead	HBO
2007	When the Levees Broke: A Requiem in Four Acts		Spike Lee	HBO
2007	Ghosts of Abu Ghraib		Rory Kennedy	HBO
2007	Star Wars: The Legacy Revealed		Kevin Burns	History
2007	Thin		Lauren Greenfield	HBO
2007	This American Life	"God's Close-Up"	Christopher Wilcha	Showtime
2008	This American Life	"Escape"	Adam Beckman and Christopher Wilcha	Showtime
2008	The Amazing Race	"Honestly, They Have Witch Powers or Something"	Bertram van Munster	CBS
2008	Autism: The Musical		Tricia Regan	HBO
2008	Project Runway	"En Garde!"	Tony Sacco	Bravo
2008	The War	"Pride of Our Nation (June–August 1944)"	Ken Burns and Lynn Novick	PBS
2009	Roman Polanski: Wanted and Desired		Marina Zenovich	HBO
2009	The Amazing Race	"Don't Let a Cheese Hit Me"	Bertram van Munster	CBS
2009	Project Runway	"Finale, Part 1"	Paul Starkman	Bravo
2009	This American Life	"John Smith"	Adam Beckman and Christopher Wilcha	Showtime
2009	Top Chef	"The Last Supper"	Steve Hryniewicz	Bravo

=== 2010s ===
Year	Program	Episode	Nominee(s)	Network
2010	American Experience	"My Lai"	Barak Goodman	PBS
2010	The Amazing Race	"I Think We're Fighting the Germans, Right?"	Bertram van Munster	CBS
2010	By the People: The Election of Barack Obama		Amy Rice and Alicia Sams	HBO
2010	Monty Python: Almost the Truth (Lawyers Cut)	"Lust for Glory"	Bill Jones and Ben Timlett	IFC
2010	Terror in Mumbai		Dan Reed	HBO
2011	Gasland		Josh Fox	HBO
2011	The Amazing Race	"You Don't Get Paid Unless You Win"	Bertram van Munster	CBS
2011	American Masters	"A Letter to Elia/Reflecting on Kazan"	Kent Jones and Martin Scorsese	PBS
2011	Becoming Chaz		Fenton Bailey and Randy Barbato	OWN
2011	Top Chef	"Give Me Your Huddled Masses"	Paul Starkman	Bravo
2012	George Harrison: Living in the Material World		Martin Scorsese	HBO
2012	The Amazing Race	"Let Them Drink Their Haterade"	Bertram van Munster	CBS
2012	American Masters	"Woody Allen: A Documentary"	Robert B. Weide	PBS
2012	Project Runway	"Finale, Part 2"	Craig Spirko	Lifetime
2012	Paradise Lost 3: Purgatory		Joe Berlinger and Bruce Sinofsky	HBO
2013	American Masters	"Mel Brooks: Make a Noise"	Robert Trachtenberg	PBS
2013	Ethel		Rory Kennedy	HBO
2013	Mea Maxima Culpa: Silence in the House of God		Alex Gibney	HBO
2013	Survivor	"Live Finale and Reunion (Caramoan: Fans vs. Favorites)"	Glenn Weiss	CBS
2013	Survivor	"Live Finale and Reunion (Philippines)"	Michael Simon	CBS
2014	The Square		Jehane Noujaim	Netflix
2014	The Amazing Race	"Part Like the Red Sea"	Bertram van Munster	CBS
2014	Cosmos: A Spacetime Odyssey	"Standing Up in the Milky Way"	Brannon Braga	Fox
2014	Project Runway	"Sky's the Limit"	Craig Spirko	Lifetime
2014	Shark Tank	"Episode 501"	Ken Fuchs	ABC
2015	Going Clear: Scientology and the Prison of Belief		Alex Gibney	HBO
2015	Citizenfour		Laura Poitras	HBO
2015	Foo Fighters: Sonic Highways	"Washington D.C."	Dave Grohl	HBO
2015	The Jinx: The Life and Deaths of Robert Durst	"Chapter 2: Poor Little Rich Boy"	Andrew Jarecki	HBO
2015	Kurt Cobain: Montage of Heck		Brett Morgen	HBO
2016	Making a Murderer	"Fighting for Their Lives"	Moira Demos and Laura Ricciardi	Netflix
2016	Cartel Land		Matthew Heineman	A&E
2016	Chef's Table	"Gaggan Anand"	David Gelb	Netflix
2016	He Named Me Malala		Davis Guggenheim	Nat Geo
2016	What Happened, Miss Simone?		Liz Garbus	Netflix
2017	O.J.: Made in America	"Part 3"	Ezra Edelman	ESPN
2017	Bright Lights: Starring Carrie Fisher and Debbie Reynolds		Alexis Bloom and Fisher Stevens	HBO
2017	Planet Earth II	"Cities"	Fredi Devas	BBC America
2017	Planet Earth II	"Islands"	Elizabeth White	BBC America
2017	13th		Ava DuVernay	Netflix
2018	Outstanding Directing for a Reality Program			
2018	RuPaul's Drag Race	"10s Across the Board"	Nick Murray	VH1
2018	The Amazing Race	"It's Just a Million Dollars, No Pressure"	Bertram van Munster	CBS
2018	American Ninja Warrior	"Daytona Beach Qualifiers"	Patrick McManus	NBC
2018	Shark Tank	"Episode 903"	Ken Fuchs	ABC
2018	The Voice	"Live Top 11 Performances"	Alan Carter	NBC
2019
2019	Queer Eye	"Black Girl Magic"	Hisham Abed	Netflix
2019	The Amazing Race	"Who Wants a Rolex?"	Bertram van Munster	CBS
2019	American Ninja Warrior	"Minneapolis City Qualifiers"	Patrick McManus	NBC
2019	RuPaul's Drag Race	"Whatcha Unpackin?"	Nick Murray	VH1
2019	Shark Tank	"Episode 1002"	Ken Fuchs	ABC

=== 2020s ===
Year	Program	Episode	Nominee(s)	Network
2020
2020	Cheer	"Daytona"	Greg Whiteley	Netflix
2020	LEGO Masters	"Mega City Block"	Rich Kim	Fox
2020	Queer Eye	"Disabled But Not Really"	Hisham Abed	Netflix
2020	RuPaul's Drag Race	"I'm That Bitch"	Nick Murray	VH1
2020	Top Chef	"The Jonathan Gold Standard"	Ariel Boles	Bravo
2021
2021	RuPaul's Drag Race	"Gettin' Lucky"	Nick Murray	VH1
2021	The Amazing Race	"Give Me a Beard Bump"	Bertram van Munster	CBS
2021	Queer Eye	"Preaching Out Loud"	Mark Perez	Netflix
2021	Top Chef	"Pan African Portland"	Ariel Boles	Bravo
2021	The Voice	"The Blind Auditions Premiere"	Alan Carter	NBC
2022
2022	Lizzo's Watch Out for the Big Grrrls	"Naked"	Nneka Onuorah	Prime Video
2022	Cheer	"Daytona Pt. 2: If the Judges Disagree"	Greg Whiteley	Netflix
2022	Queer Eye	"Angel Gets Her Wings"	Aaron Krummel	Netflix
2022	RuPaul's Drag Race	"Moulin Ru: The Rusical"	Nick Murray	VH1
2022	Top Chef	"Freedmen's Town"	Ariel Boles	Bravo
2023
2023	Welcome to Wrexham	"Wide World of Wales"	Bryan Rowland	FX
2023	The Amazing Race	"Patience, Is the New Me"	Bertram van Munster	CBS
2023	Queer Eye	"Speedy for Life"	Ali Moghadas	Netflix
2023	RuPaul's Drag Race	"Wigloose: The Rusical!"	Nick Murray	MTV
2023	Top Chef	"London Calling"	Ariel Boles	Bravo
2024
2024	Love on the Spectrum U.S.	"Episode 7"	Cian O'Clery	Netflix
2024	RuPaul's Drag Race	"Grand Finale"	Nick Murray	MTV
2024	Squid Game: The Challenge	"Red Light, Green Light"	Diccon Ramsay	Netflix
2024	The Traitors	"Betrayers, Fakes and Fraudsters"	Ben Archard	Peacock
2024	Welcome to Wrexham	"Shaun's Vacation"	Bryan Rowland	FX
2025
2025	The Traitors	"Let Battle Commence"	Ben Archard	Peacock
2025	The Amazing Race	"It Smells Like the Desert"	Bertram van Munster	CBS
2025	Love on the Spectrum	"Episode 7"	Cian O'Clery	Netflix
2025	RuPaul's Drag Race	"Squirrel Games"	Nick Murray	MTV
2025	Top Chef	"Foraged in Fire"	Ariel Boles	Bravo
2026
2026	The Traitors	"Let the Cards Fall As They Will"	Ben Archard	Peacock
2026	The Amazing Race	"I'm Not a Big Fan of Olives"	Bertram van Munster	CBS
2026	Love on the Spectrum	"Episode 1"	Cian O'Clery	Netflix
2026	RuPaul's Drag Race	"Grand Finale"	Nick Murray	MTV
2026	Top Chef	"Carolina Roots"	Anna Moulaison	Bravo

== Programs with multiple wins ==
2 wins

- RuPaul's Drag Race
- The Traitors

== Programs with multiple nominations ==
12 nominations

- The Amazing Race

9 nominations

- RuPaul's Drag Race

8 nominations

- Top Chef

5 nominations

- Queer Eye

4 nominations

- Project Runway

3 nominations

- Love on the Spectrum
- Shark Tank
- The Traitors

2 nominations

- American Idol
- American Ninja Warrior
- Cheer
- Survivor
- The Voice
- Welcome to Wrexham

== Individuals with multiple wins ==
2 wins

- Ben Archard (consecutive)
- Nick Murray

== Individuals with multiple nominations ==
12 nominations

- Bertram van Munster

9 nominations

- Nick Murray

5 nominations

- Ariel Boles

3 nominations

- Ben Archard
- Ken Fuchs
- Cian O'Clery

2 nominations

- Hisham Abed
- Alan Carter
- Bruce Gowers
- Patrick McManus
- Bryan Rowland
- Craig Spirko
- Paul Starkman
- Glenn Weiss
- Greg Whiteley
