= Jazzy Collins =

American casting director and producer

- Born: Jasmine Norman; Huntington Station, NY
- Education: Quinnipiac University
- Occupations: Casting director, producer
- Years active: 2014–present
- Awards: Emmy Award for Outstanding Casting (2023)

Jazzy Collins is an American casting director and producer. She is known for her work as a casting producer on The Bachelorette, The Circle, and The Traitors, and for her work as a casting director on Lizzo's Watch Out for the Big Grrrls and various shows for Dropout.

== Early life, family and education ==
Collins was born as Jasmine Norman to parents Glenn Norman and Mary Norman and grew up in Huntington Station, New York. She has one sister, Sabrina.

Collins attended Quinnipiac University and earned a Bachelor of Arts in Film, Video, and Interactive Media.

== Professional career ==
Collins began her film and television career in Los Angeles in 2014. Her first casting job was as a casting assistant on Let's Ask America, after applying for a production assistant job and being asked if she'd be interested in casting instead. Her career took her from there to America's Got Talent followed by The Bachelorette, where she was promoted to casting producer (36 episodes, 2017–2019). She went on to serve as a casting producer on The Circle (52 episodes, 2021–2023) and as a casting producer and producer on season 1 of The Traitors (2023).

Collins received her first Emmy nomination in 2022 for her work as a casting director on Lizzo's Watch Out for the Big Grrrls, followed by her first Emmy win in 2023 for season 1 of The Traitors, on which she served as a casting producer.

In 2023, Collins started the production company Forced Perspective to produce film and TV projects spearheaded by underrepresented creatives. The company produced the Los Angeles unit of the Disney+ show Percy Jackson and the Olympians (season 1).

In January 2024, Collins became the first Black person to win the Primetime Emmy Award for Outstanding Casting for a Reality Program.

In May 2024, Collins gave the commencement address at her alma mater, Quinnipiac University.

Collins is a member of the Casting Society of America.

== Activism on inclusion ==
In 2020, Collins published an open letter detailing her time working as a casting producer on The Bachelor and The Bachelorette that called out "systematic racism" and "whitewashing" at the shows. Collins' letter was part of a broader wave of criticism from former cast members and viewers regarding diversity in the franchise.
