= 70th Primetime Creative Arts Emmy Awards =

2018 American television programming awards

- Date: September 8–9, 2018
- Location: Microsoft Theater; Los Angeles, California
- Presented by: Academy of Television Arts & Sciences
- Most awards: Game of Thrones; Saturday Night Live (7)
- Most nominations: Westworld (16)

Television/radio coverage
- Network: FXX

The 70th Primetime Creative Arts Emmy Awards honored the best in artistic and technical achievement in American prime time television programming from June 1, 2017, until May 31, 2018, as chosen by the Academy of Television Arts & Sciences. The awards were presented across two ceremonies on September 8 and September 9, 2018. The nominations were announced on July 12, 2018. The ceremony was in conjunction with the annual Primetime Emmy Awards and is presented in recognition of technical and other similar achievements in American television programming, including guest acting roles.

The three wins of John Legend, Tim Rice, and Andrew Lloyd Webber made them the thirteenth, fourteenth, and fifteenth persons to become an EGOT for winning Outstanding Variety Special (Live).

== Winners and nominees ==
Winners are listed first, highlighted in boldface, and indicated with a double dagger (‡).

=== Governors Award ===
- **Star Trek** (presented to CBS Television Studios)

=== Programs ===
Programs
**Outstanding Structured Reality Program**: **Queer Eye (Netflix)**; Antiques Roadshow (PBS); Fixer Upper (HGTV); Lip Sync Battle (Paramount Network); Shark Tank (ABC); Who Do You Think You Are? (TLC)	**Outstanding Unstructured Reality Program**: **United Shades of America (CNN)**; Born This Way (A&E); Deadliest Catch (Discovery Channel); Intervention (A&E); Naked and Afraid (Discovery Channel); RuPaul's Drag Race: Untucked (VH1)
**Outstanding Television Movie**: **"USS Callister" (Black Mirror) (Netflix)**; Fahrenheit 451 (HBO); Flint (Lifetime); Paterno (HBO); The Tale (HBO)	**Outstanding Variety Special (Pre-Recorded)**: **Dave Chappelle: Equanimity (Netflix)**; The Carol Burnett Show: 50th Anniversary Special (CBS); Carpool Karaoke Primetime Special 2018 (CBS); Full Frontal with Samantha Bee Presents the Great American* Puerto Rico (*It's complicated.) (TBS); Steve Martin and Martin Short: An Evening You Will Forget for the Rest of Your Life (Netflix)
**Outstanding Informational Series or Special**: **Anthony Bourdain: Parts Unknown (CNN)**; Leah Remini: Scientology and the Aftermath (A&E); My Next Guest Needs No Introduction with David Letterman (Netflix); StarTalk with Neil deGrasse Tyson (Nat Geo); Vice (HBO)	**Outstanding Documentary or Nonfiction Series**: **Wild Wild Country (Netflix)**; American Masters (PBS); Blue Planet II (BBC America); The Defiant Ones (HBO); The Fourth Estate (Showtime)
**Outstanding Documentary or Nonfiction Special**: **The Zen Diaries of Garry Shandling (HBO)**; Icarus (Netflix); Jim & Andy: The Great Beyond (Netflix); Mister Rogers: It's You I Like (PBS); Spielberg (HBO)	**Outstanding Animated Program**: **Rick and Morty: "Pickle Rick" (Adult Swim)**; Big Hero 6: The Series: "Baymax Returns" (Disney XD); Bob's Burgers: "V for Valentine-detta" (Fox); The Simpsons: "Gone Boy" (Fox); South Park: "Put It Down" (Comedy Central)
**Outstanding Short Form Animated Program**: **Robot Chicken: "Freshly Baked: The Robot Chicken Santa Claus Pot Cookie Freakout Special: Special Edition" (Adult Swim)**; Adventure Time: "Ring of Fire" (Cartoon Network); Steven Universe: "Jungle Moon" (Cartoon Network); Teen Titans Go!: "The Self-Indulgent 200th Episode Spectacular! Pt. 1 and Pt. 2" (Cartoon Network); We Bare Bears: "Hurricane Hal" (Cartoon Network)	**Outstanding Children's Program**: **The Magical Wand Chase: A Sesame Street Special (HBO)**; Alexa & Katie (Netflix); Fuller House (Netflix); A Series of Unfortunate Events (Netflix); Star Wars Rebels (Disney XD)
**Outstanding Variety Special (Live)**: **Jesus Christ Superstar Live in Concert (NBC)**; 75th Golden Globe Awards (NBC); 60th Annual Grammy Awards (CBS); Night of Too Many Stars: America Unites for Autism Programs (HBO); The Oscars (ABC)	**Outstanding Short Form Nonfiction or Reality Series**: **Anthony Bourdain: Explore Parts Unknown (CNN.com)**; The Americans: The Final Season (FX); The Assassination of Gianni Versace: American Crime Story: America's Obsessions (FX); Jay Leno's Garage (NBC.com); Top Chef: Last Chance Kitchen (bravotv.com)
**Exceptional Merit in Documentary Filmmaking**: **Strong Island (Netflix)**; City of Ghosts (A&E); Jane (Nat Geo); What Haunts Us (Starz)	**Outstanding Short Form Comedy or Drama Series**: **James Corden's Next James Corden (CBS on Snapchat)**; aka Wyatt Cenac (TOPIC.com); An Emmy for Megan (anemmyformegan.com); Grey's Anatomy: B Team (abc.go.com); The Walking Dead: Red Machete (AMC.com)
**Outstanding Short Form Variety Series**: **Carpool Karaoke: The Series (Apple Music)**; Creating Saturday Night Live (nbc.com); The Daily Show — Between the Scenes (thedailyshow.com); Gay of Thrones (FunnyOrDie); Honest Trailers (YouTube); The Tonight Show Starring Jimmy Fallon - Cover Room (nbc.com)

=== Acting ===
Acting
**Outstanding Guest Actor in a Comedy Series**: **Katt Williams – Atlanta: "Alligator Man" as Willie (FX)**; Sterling K. Brown – Brooklyn Nine-Nine: "The Box" as Philip Davidson (Fox); Bryan Cranston – Curb Your Enthusiasm: "Running with the Bulls" as Dr. Templeton (HBO); Donald Glover – Saturday Night Live: "Host: Donald Glover" as host (NBC); Bill Hader – Saturday Night Live: "Host: Bill Hader" as host (NBC); Lin-Manuel Miranda – Curb Your Enthusiasm: "Fatwa!" as himself (HBO)	**Outstanding Guest Actress in a Comedy Series**: **Tiffany Haddish – Saturday Night Live: "Host: Tiffany Haddish" as host (NBC)**; Tina Fey – Saturday Night Live: "Host: Tina Fey" as host (NBC); Jane Lynch – The Marvelous Mrs. Maisel: "Put That on Your Plate!" as Sophie Lennon (Prime Video); Maya Rudolph – The Good Place: "The Burrito" as Judge Gen (NBC); Molly Shannon – Will & Grace: "There's Something About Larry" as Val (NBC); Wanda Sykes – Black-ish: "Juneteenth" as Daphne Lido (ABC)
**Outstanding Guest Actor in a Drama Series**: **Ron Cephas Jones – This Is Us: "A Father's Advice" as William "Shakespeare" Hill (NBC)**; F. Murray Abraham – Homeland: "All In" as Dar Adal (Showtime); Cameron Britton – Mindhunter: "Episode 2" as Edmund Kemper (Netflix); Matthew Goode – The Crown: "Matrimonium" as Tony Armstrong-Jones (Netflix); Gerald McRaney – This Is Us: "The Car" as Dr. Nathan Katowski (NBC); Jimmi Simpson – Westworld: "Reunion" as William (HBO)	**Outstanding Guest Actress in a Drama Series**: **Samira Wiley – The Handmaid's Tale: "After" as Moira (Hulu)**; Viola Davis – Scandal: "Allow Me to Reintroduce Myself" as Annalise Keating (ABC); Kelly Jenrette – The Handmaid's Tale: "Other Women" as Annie (Hulu); Cherry Jones – The Handmaid's Tale: "Baggage" as Holly Osborne (Hulu); Diana Rigg – Game of Thrones: "The Queen's Justice" as Lady Olenna Tyrell (HBO); Cicely Tyson – How to Get Away with Murder: "I'm Going Away" as Ophelia Harkness (ABC)
**Outstanding Character Voice-Over Performance**: **Alex Borstein – Family Guy: "Nanny Goats" as Lois Griffin, Babs Pewterschmidt, Natalia, Female Hippo, Woman in Car, and Female Voice (Fox)**; Dan Castellaneta – The Simpsons: "Fears of a Clown" as Homer Simpson, Krusty the Clown, Groundskeeper Willie, and Sideshow Mel (Fox); Seth MacFarlane – American Dad!: "The Talented Mr. Dingleberry" as Stan Smith and Roger Smith (TBS); Seth MacFarlane – Family Guy: "Send in Stewie, Please" as Stewie Griffin and Brian Griffin (Fox); Russi Taylor – Mickey Mouse: "The Scariest Story Ever: A Mickey Mouse Halloween Spooktacular" as Huey, Dewey, Louie, Grandma, the Witch, and Minnie Mouse (Disney Channel)	**Outstanding Narrator**: **Sir David Attenborough – Blue Planet II: "One Ocean" (BBC America)**; Charles Dance – Savage Kingdom: "Uprising: First Blood" (Nat Geo WILD); Morgan Freeman – March of the Penguins 2: The Next Step (Hulu); Carl Reiner – If You're Not in the Obit, Eat Breakfast (HBO); Liev Schreiber – 24/7: "Canelo-Golovkin" (HBO)
**Outstanding Actor in a Short Form Comedy or Drama Series**: **James Corden – James Corden's Next James Corden as James Corden (CBS on Snapchat)**; Alexis Denisof – I Love Bekka & Lucy as Glenn (Stage13.com); Melvin Jackson Jr. – This Eddie Murphy Role Is Mine, Not Yours as Melvin Jackson Jr. / Eddie Murphy (YouTube); DeStorm Power – Caught The Series as himself (YouTube); Miles Tagtmeyer – Broken as Liam (Vimeo)	**Outstanding Actress in a Short Form Comedy or Drama Series**: **Christina Pickles – Break a Hip as Biz (Vimeo)**; Megan Amram – An Emmy for Megan as Megan Amram (anemmyformegan.com); Lee Garlington – Broken as Darlene (Vimeo); Naomi Grossman – Ctrl Alt Delete as Lorna (Facebook.com); Diarra Kilpatrick – American Koko as Akosua Millard (abc.go.com); Kelli O'Hara – The Accidental Wolf as Katie Bonner (theaccidentalwolf.com)

=== Animation ===
Animation
**Outstanding Individual Achievement in Animation (Juried)**
- Adventure Time: "Ketchup" – Lindsay Small-Butera (Cartoon Network)
- Hey Arnold!: The Jungle Movie – Stu Livingston (Nickelodeon)
- The Number on Great-Grandpa's Arm – Jeff Scher (HBO)
- The Scariest Story Ever: A Mickey Mouse Halloween Spooktacular – Justin Martin (Disney Channel)
- The Simpsons: "Springfield Splendor" – Caroline Cruikshank (Fox)
- Steven Universe: "Jungle Moon" – Patrick Bryson (Cartoon Network)

=== Casting ===
Casting
**Outstanding Casting for a Comedy Series**: **The Marvelous Mrs. Maisel – Meredith Tucker, Jeanie Bacharach and Cindy Tolan (Prime Video)**; Atlanta – Alexa L. Fogel, Tara Feldstein Bennett and Chase Paris (FX); Barry – Sharon Bialy and Sherry Thomas (HBO); GLOW – Jennifer Euston and Elizabeth Barnes (Netflix); Silicon Valley – Jeanne McCarthy, Nicole Abellera Hallman and Leslie Woo(HBO)	**Outstanding Casting for a Drama Series**: **The Crown – Nina Gold and Robert Sterne (Netflix)**; Game of Thrones – Nina Gold, Robert Sterne and Carla Stronge (HBO); The Handmaid's Tale – Sharon Bialy, Sherry Thomas, Russell Scott and Robin D. Cook (Hulu); Stranger Things – Carmen Cuba, Tara Feldstein Bennett and Chase Paris (Netflix); Westworld – John Papsidera (HBO)
**Outstanding Casting for a Limited Series, Movie or Special**: **The Assassination of Gianni Versace: American Crime Story – Courtney Bright and Nicole Daniels (FX)**; Godless –Ellen Lewis, Rene Haynes and Jo Edna Boldin – location casting director(Netflix); Jesus Christ Superstar Live in Concert – Bernard Telsey and Patrick Goodwin (NBC); The Looming Tower – Avy Kaufman, Leo Davis, Lissy Holm and Moonyeenn Lee (Hulu); Patrick Melrose – Nina Gold and Martin Ware (Showtime)	**Outstanding Casting for a Reality Program**: **Queer Eye – Ally Capriotti Grant, Beyhan Oguz, Gretchen Palek and Danielle Gervais (Netflix)**; Born This Way – Sasha Alpert, Megan Sleeper and Caitlyn Audet (A&E); Project Runway – Sasha Alpert, Alissa Haight Carlton, Jen DeMartino and Rebecca Snavely (Lifetime); RuPaul's Drag Race –Goloka Bolte and Ethan Petersen (VH1); The Voice – Michelle McNulty, Holly Dale and Courtney Burns (NBC)

=== Choreography ===
Programs
**Outstanding Choreography**
- **So You Think You Can Dance: "Brand New" / "To Make You Feel My Love" – Mandy Moore (Fox)**
  - The Late Late Show with James Corden: "The Greatest Showman" / "Crosswalk the Musical on Broadway" – Chloe Arnold (CBS)
  - So You Think You Can Dance: "Change Is Everything" / "Strange Fruit" – Travis Wall (Fox)
  - So You Think You Can Dance: "The Man That Got Away" / "L-O-V-E" – Al Blackstone (Fox)
  - So You Think You Can Dance: "Prism" / "Say You Won't Let Go" – Christopher Scott (Fox)

=== Cinematography ===
Cinematography
**Outstanding Cinematography for a Multi-Camera Series**: **Will & Grace: "A Gaye Olde Christmas" – Gary Baum (NBC)**; The Ranch: "Do What You Gotta Do" – Donald A. Morgan (Netflix); Superior Donuts: "Grades of Wrath" – Paty Lee (CBS)	**Outstanding Cinematography for a Single-Camera Series (Half-Hour)**: **Atlanta: "Teddy Perkins" – Christian Sprenger (FX)**; Barry: "Chapter Eight: Know Your Truth" – Paula Huidobro (HBO); The End of the F***ing World: "Episode 3" – Justin Brown (Netflix); GLOW: "Pilot" – Christian Sprenger (Netflix); Insecure: "Hella LA" – Patrick Cady (HBO); Mozart in the Jungle: "Ichi Go Ichi E" – Tobias Datum (Prime Video)
**Outstanding Cinematography for a Limited Series or Movie**: **Genius: Picasso: "Chapter One" – Mathias Herndl (Nat Geo)**; The Alienist: "The Boy on the Bridge" – PJ Dillon (TNT); Black Mirror: "USS Callister" – Stephan Pehrsson (Netflix); Fahrenheit 451 – Kramer Morgenthau (HBO); Godless: "An Incident at Creede" – Steven Meizler (Netflix); Twin Peaks: "Part 8" – Peter Deming (Showtime)	**Outstanding Cinematography for a Single-Camera Series (One Hour)**: **The Crown: "Beryl" – Adriano Goldman (Netflix)**; The Handmaid's Tale: "June" – Colin Watkinson (Hulu); Legion: "Chapter 8" – Dana Gonzales (FX); The Marvelous Mrs. Maisel: "Pilot" – M. David Mullen (Prime Video); Ozark: "The Toll" – Ben Kutchins (Netflix); Stranger Things: "Chapter One: MADMAX" – Tim Ives (Netflix); Westworld: "The Riddle of the Sphinx" – John Grillo (HBO)
**Outstanding Cinematography for a Reality Program**: **Life Below Zero (Nat Geo)**; The Amazing Race: "It's Just a Million Dollars, No Pressure" (CBS); Born This Way: "Homecoming" (A&E); Deadliest Catch: "Battle Lines" (Discovery Channel); Queer Eye: "To Gay or Not Too Gay" (Netflix); RuPaul's Drag Race: "10s Across the Board" (VH1)	**Outstanding Cinematography for Nonfiction Programming**: **Jane – Ellen Kuras and Hugo van Lawick (Nat Geo)**; Anthony Bourdain: Parts Unknown: "Lagos" – Morgan Fallon, Jerry Risius and Tarik Hameedi (CNN); Blue Planet II: "The Deep" – Gavin Thurston (BBC America); Blue Planet II: "One Ocean" – Ted Giffords and Roger Munns (BBC America); Chef's Table: "Corrado Assenza" – Adam Bricker (Netflix)

=== Commercial ===
Commercial
**Outstanding Commercial**
- **"The Talk" (My Black Is Beautiful X P&G)**
  - "Alexa Loses Her Voice" (Amazon)
  - "Earth: Shot on iPhone" (iPhone)
  - "In Real Life" (Monica Lewinsky – Anti-Bullying)
  - "It's a Tide Ad" (Tide)

=== Costumes ===
Costumes
**Outstanding Period Costumes**: **The Crown: "Dear Mrs. Kennedy" (Netflix)**; The Alienist: "A Fruitful Partnership" (TNT); Genius: Picasso: "Chapter One" (Nat Geo); The Marvelous Mrs. Maisel: "The Disappointment of the Dionne Quintuplets" (Prime Video); Outlander: "Freedom & Whisky" (Starz)	**Outstanding Fantasy/Sci-Fi Costumes**: **Game of Thrones: "Beyond the Wall" (HBO)**; Fahrenheit 451 (HBO); The Handmaid's Tale: "Seeds" (Hulu); A Series of Unfortunate Events: "The Vile Village: Part 1" (Netflix); Westworld: "Akane no Mai" (HBO)
**Outstanding Contemporary Costumes**: **The Assassination of Gianni Versace: American Crime Story: "The Man Who Would Be Vogue" (FX)**; Black-ish: "Juneteenth" (ABC); Empire: "Slave to Memory" (Fox); Grace and Frankie: "The Expiration Date" (Netflix); This Is Us: "The Wedding" (NBC)	**Outstanding Costumes for a Variety, Nonfiction, or Reality Programming**: **RuPaul's Drag Race: "10s Across the Board" (VH1)**; Dancing with the Stars: "Disney Night" (ABC); Jesus Christ Superstar Live in Concert (NBC); Saturday Night Live: "Host: Natalie Portman" (NBC); Tracey Ullman's Show: "Episode 1" (HBO)

=== Directing ===
Directing
**Outstanding Directing for a Documentary/Nonfiction Program**: **Jane – Brett Morgen (Nat Geo)**; Icarus – Bryan Fogel (Netflix); The Vietnam War: "Episode 8: The History of the World (April 1969–May 1970)" – Ken Burns and Lynn Novick (PBS); Wild Wild Country: "Part 3" – Chapman Way and Maclain Way (Netflix); The Zen Diaries of Garry Shandling – Judd Apatow (HBO)	**Outstanding Directing for a Variety Series**: **Saturday Night Live: "Host: Donald Glover" – Don Roy King (NBC)**; Full Frontal with Samantha Bee: "Episode 2061" – Andre Allen (TBS); Last Week Tonight with John Oliver: "Episode 421" – Paul Pennolino (HBO); The Late Late Show with James Corden: "Episode 0416" – Tim Mancinelli (CBS); The Late Show with Stephen Colbert: "Episode 438" – Jim Hoskinson (CBS); Portlandia: "Riot Spray" – Carrie Brownstein (IFC)
**Outstanding Directing for a Reality Program**: **RuPaul's Drag Race: "10s Across the Board" – Nick Murray (VH1)**; The Amazing Race: "It's Just a Million Dollars, No Pressure" – Bertram van Munster (CBS); American Ninja Warrior: "Daytona Beach Qualifiers" – Patrick McManus (NBC); Shark Tank: "Episode 903" – Ken Fuchs (ABC); The Voice: "Live Top 11 Performances" – Alan Carter (NBC)

=== Hairstyling ===
Hairstyling
**Outstanding Hairstyling for a Single-Camera Series**: **Westworld: "Akane no Mai" (HBO)**; The Crown: "Dear Mrs. Kennedy" (Netflix); Game of Thrones: "The Dragon and the Wolf" (HBO); GLOW: "Pilot" (Netflix); The Marvelous Mrs. Maisel: "Pilot" (Prime Video)	**Outstanding Hairstyling for a Multi-Camera Series or Special**: **RuPaul's Drag Race: "10s Across the Board" (VH1)**; Dancing with the Stars: "Night at the Movies" (ABC); Jesus Christ Superstar Live in Concert (NBC); Saturday Night Live: "Host: Tiffany Haddish" (NBC); The Voice: "Live Finale, Part 1" (NBC)
**Outstanding Hairstyling for a Limited Series or Movie**: **The Assassination of Gianni Versace: American Crime Story (FX)**; American Horror Story: Cult (FX); Genius: Picasso (Nat Geo); Godless (Netflix); The Last Tycoon: "Oscar, Oscar, Oscar" (Prime Video); Twin Peaks (Showtime)

=== Hosting ===
Hosting
**Outstanding Host for a Reality or Reality-Competition Program**
- **RuPaul Charles – RuPaul's Drag Race (VH1)**
  - W. Kamau Bell – United Shades of America (CNN)
  - Ellen DeGeneres – Ellen's Game of Games (NBC)
  - Heidi Klum and Tim Gunn – Project Runway (Lifetime)
  - Jane Lynch – Hollywood Game Night (NBC)

=== Interactive Media ===
Programs
**Outstanding Original Interactive Program**: **NASA JPL: Cassini's Grand Finale (YouTube)**; Back to the Moon (Google); Blade Runner 2049: Memory Lab (Oculus); Coco VR (Oculus); Spider-Man Homecoming VR Experience (PlayStation VR App)	**Outstanding Interactive Program**: **Last Week Tonight with John Oliver (HBO)**; The Daily Show (Comedy Central); Full Frontal with Samantha Bee Online (TBS); The Late Late Show with James Corden (CBS); Saturday Night Live (NBC)
**Outstanding Creative Achievement in Interactive Media within a Scripted Program**: **Westworld – Chaos Takes Control Interactive Experience (HBO)**; Mr. Robot – Ecoin (USA); Rick and Morty – Virtual Rick-ality (Adult Swim); Silicon Valley – Interactive World: Not Hotdog, VR & Twitter-Powered Pizza Drones (HBO); 13 Reasons Why – Talk to the Reasons (Netflix)	**Outstanding Creative Achievement in Interactive Media within an Unscripted Program**: **CONAN without Borders (TBS)**; The Oscars: All Access (Oscars.com); RuPaul's Drag Race – Season 10 RuVeal (VH1); Watch What Happens Live with Andy Cohen (Bravo)

=== Lighting Design / Direction ===
Lighting Design / Direction
**Outstanding Lighting Design / Lighting Direction for a Variety Series**: **Saturday Night Live: "Host: Kevin Hart" (NBC)**; America's Got Talent: "The Finals" (NBC); Dancing with the Stars: "Halloween Night" (ABC); So You Think You Can Dance: "Finale" (Fox); The Voice: "Live Finale (Part 1)" (NBC)	**Outstanding Lighting Design / Lighting Direction for a Variety Special**: **Jesus Christ Superstar Live in Concert (NBC)**; 60th Grammy Awards (CBS); The Oscars (ABC); Super Bowl LII Halftime Show Starring Justin Timberlake (NBC); 71st Annual Tony Awards (CBS)

=== Main Title Design ===
Main Title Design
**Outstanding Main Title Design**
- **Counterpart (Starz)**
  - The Alienist (TNT)
  - Altered Carbon (Netflix)
  - GLOW (Netflix)
  - Westworld (HBO)

=== Make-up ===
Makeup
**Outstanding Make-up for a Single-Camera Series (Non-Prosthetic)**: **Westworld: "Akane no Mai" (HBO)**; Game of Thrones: "The Dragon and the Wolf" (HBO); GLOW: "Money's on the Chase" (Netflix); The Handmaid's Tale: "Unwomen" (Hulu); This Is Us: "Number Three" (NBC); Vikings: "Homeland" (History)	**Outstanding Make-up for a Multi-Camera Series or Special (Non-Prosthetic)**: **Saturday Night Live: "Host: Tina Fey" (NBC)**; Dancing with the Stars: "Halloween Night" (ABC); Jesus Christ Superstar Live in Concert (NBC); RuPaul's Drag Race: "10s Across the Board" (VH1); The Voice: "Live Finale, Part 1" (NBC)
**Outstanding Make-up for a Limited Series or Movie (Non-Prosthetic)**: **The Assassination of Gianni Versace: American Crime Story (FX)**; American Horror Story: Cult (FX); Genius: Picasso (Nat Geo); The Last Tycoon: "Oscar, Oscar, Oscar" (Prime Video); Twin Peaks (Showtime)	**Outstanding Prosthetic Makeup for a Series, Limited Series, Movie or Special**: **Game of Thrones: "The Dragon and the Wolf" (HBO)**; American Horror Story: Cult (FX); The Assassination of Gianni Versace: American Crime Story (FX); Star Trek: Discovery: "Will You Take My Hand?" (CBS); Westworld: "The Riddle of the Sphinx" (HBO)

=== Motion Design ===
Motion Design
**Outstanding Motion Design (Juried)**
- **Broad City: "Mushrooms" – Mike Perry, Isam Prado, Eric Perez, Maya Edelman, and Barbara Benas (Comedy Central)**
- **Wasted! The Story of Food Waste – Mike Houston, Daniel de Graaf, Naoko Saito, Ryan Frost, and Chris King (Starz)**

=== Music ===
Music
**Outstanding Music Composition for a Series (Original Dramatic Score)**: **Game of Thrones: "The Dragon and the Wolf" – Ramin Djawadi (HBO)**; Marvel's Jessica Jones: "AKA Playland" – Sean Callery (Netflix); Once Upon a Time: "Leaving Storybrooke" – Mark Isham, Cindy O'Connor, and Michael Simon (ABC); SEAL Team: "Pattern of Life" – W.G. Snuffy Walden and A. Patrick Rose (CBS); Star Wars Rebels: "Family Reunion – and Farewell" – Kevin Kiner (Disney XD); Westworld: "Akane no Mai" – Ramin Djawadi (HBO)	**Outstanding Music Composition for a Limited Series, Movie, or Special (Original Dramatic Score)**: **March of the Penguins 2: The Next Step – Cyril Aufort (Hulu)**; Alias Grace: "Part 1" – Mychael Danna and Jeff Danna (Netflix); Black Mirror: "USS Callister" – Daniel Pemberton (Netflix); Godless: "Homecoming" – Carlos Rafael Rivera (Netflix); Philip K. Dick's Electric Dreams: "The Commuter" – Harry Gregson-Williams (Prime Video); Philip K. Dick's Electric Dreams: "Crazy Diamond" – Cristobal Tapia de Veer (Prime Video)
**Outstanding Music Direction**: **Tony Bennett: The Library of Congress Gershwin Prize for Popular Song (PBS)**; Bruno Mars: 24K Magic Live at the Apollo (CBS); Elton John: I'm Still Standing – A Grammy Salute (CBS); The Oscars (ABC); Super Bowl LII Halftime Show Starring Justin Timberlake (NBC)	**Outstanding Original Music and Lyrics**: **Saturday Night Live: "Host: Chance the Rapper" – "Come Back Barack" (NBC)**; Big Mouth: "Am I Gay?" – "Totally Gay" (Netflix); A Christmas Story Live! – "In the Market for a Miracle" (Fox); The Good Fight: "Day 450" – "High Crimes and Misdemeanors" (CBS); If You're Not in the Obit, Eat Breakfast – "Just Getting Started" (HBO); Steve Martin and Martin Short: An Evening You Will Forget for the Rest of Your Life – "The Buddy Song" (Netflix)
**Outstanding Original Main Title Theme Music**: **Godless – Carlos Rafael Rivera (Netflix)**; The Last Tycoon – Mychael Danna (Prime Video); Marvel's The Defenders – John Paesano (Netflix); The Putin Interviews – Jeff Beal (Showtime); Somebody Feed Phil – Mike S. Olson, Bridget Ellen Kearney, Michael Calabrese, and Rachael Price (Netflix); The Tick – Chris Bacon (Prime Video)	**Outstanding Music Supervision**: **The Marvelous Mrs. Maisel: "Pilot" – Robin Urdang, Daniel Palladino, and Amy Sherman-Palladino (Prime Video)**; Atlanta: "Alligator Man" – Jen Malone and Fam Udeorji (FX); Stranger Things: "Trick or Treat, Freak" – Nora Felder (Netflix); This Is Us: "That'll Be the Day" – Jennifer Pyken (NBC); Westworld: "Akane no Mai" – Sean O'Meara (HBO)

=== Picture Editing ===
Picture Editing
**Outstanding Single-Camera Picture Editing for a Drama Series**: **The Handmaid's Tale: "June" – Wendy Hallam Martin (Hulu)**; Game of Thrones: "Beyond the Wall" – Tim Porter (HBO); Game of Thrones: "The Dragon and the Wolf" – Crispin Green (HBO); Game of Thrones: "The Spoils of War" – Katie Weiland (HBO); Stranger Things: "Chapter Nine: The Gate" – Kevin D. Ross (Netflix)	**Outstanding Single-Camera Picture Editing for a Comedy Series**: **The Marvelous Mrs. Maisel: "Pilot" – Brian A. Kates (Prime Video)**; Atlanta: "Alligator Man" – Isaac Hagy (FX); Atlanta: "Teddy Perkins" – Kyle Reiter (FX); Barry: "Chapter Eight: Know Your Truth" – Kyle Reiter (HBO); Barry: "Chapter Seven: Loud, Fast, and Keep Going" – Jeff Buchanan (HBO)
**Outstanding Single-Camera Picture Editing for a Limited Series or Movie**: **Black Mirror: "USS Callister" – Selina MacArthur (Netflix)**; The Assassination of Gianni Versace: American Crime Story: "Alone" – Emily Greene (FX); The Assassination of Gianni Versace: American Crime Story: "House by the Lake" – Shelly Westerman (FX); The Assassination of Gianni Versace: American Crime Story: "Manhunt" – Chi-Yoon Chung (FX); Twin Peaks: "Part 8" – Duwayne Dunham, Brian Berdan, Jonathan P. Shaw, Justin Krohn, Jason W. A. Tucker, and David Lynch (Showtime)	**Outstanding Multi-Camera Picture Editing for a Comedy Series**: **Will & Grace: "Grandpa Jack" – Peter Beyt (NBC)**; The Big Bang Theory: "The Bow Tie Asymmetry" – Peter Chakos (CBS); Mom: "Crazy Snakes and a Clog to the Head" – Joe Bella (CBS); One Day at a Time: "Not Yet" – Pat Barnett (Netflix); Roseanne: "Darlene v. David" – Brian Schnuckel (ABC)
**Outstanding Picture Editing for Variety Programming**: **Last Week Tonight with John Oliver: "Border Patrol" – Ryan Barger (HBO)**; Dave Chappelle: Equanimity – Jeff U'ren (Netflix); Drunk History: "Heroines" – John Cason (Comedy Central); Full Frontal with Samantha Bee Presents: The Great American* Puerto Rico (*It's Complicated) – Jesse Coane, Charles Divak, Daphne Gomez-Mena, Andrew Mendelson, Tennille Uithof, and Ryan Barger (TBS); Last Week Tonight with John Oliver: "Wax President Harding" – Anthony Miale (HBO); Carpool Karaoke Primetime Special 2018 – Brad Conlin and Tom Jarvis (CBS)	**Outstanding Picture Editing for Nonfiction Programming**: **Anthony Bourdain: Parts Unknown: "Lagos" – Hunter Gross (CNN)**; The Defiant Ones – Lasse Järvi and Doug Pray (HBO); Jane – Joe Beshenkovsky, Will Znidaricand, and Brett Morgen (Nat Geo); Wild Wild Country: "Part 3" – Neil Meiklejohn (Netflix); The Zen Diaries of Garry Shandling – Joe Beshenkovsky (HBO)
**Outstanding Picture Editing for a Structured or Competition Reality Program**: **Queer Eye – Thomas Scott Reuther, Joe DeShano, A.M. Peters, Ryan Taylor, Matthew D. Miller and Brian Ray (Netflix)**; The Amazing Race: "It's Just a Million Dollars, No Pressure" – Brooks Larson, Jay Gammill, Josh Lowry, Michael Bolanowski, Tori Rodman, Jason Pedroza, Eric Beetner, and Tricia Rodrigo (CBS); American Ninja Warrior: "Daytona Beach Qualifiers" – Nick Gagnon, David Green, Michael Kalbron, Corey Ziemniak, Curtis Pierce, Kyle Barr, and Mary Dechambres (NBC); RuPaul's Drag Race: "10s Across the Board" – Jamie Martin, John Lim, Drew Forni, and Michael Roha (VH1); The Voice – John M. Larson, Robert Michael Malachowski, Jr, Hudson H. Smith III, Matt Antell, Roger Bartlett, Sean Basaman, Kevin Benson, Matthew Blair, Melissa Silva Borden, William Fabian Castro, Grady Cooper, A.J. Dickerson, Glen Ebesu, Noel A. Guerra, John Homesley, Omega Hsu, Ryan P. James, Charles A. Kramer, James J. Munoz, Rich Remis, David I. Sowell, Robby Thompson, and Eric Wise (NBC)	**Outstanding Picture Editing for an Unstructured Reality Program**: **United Shades of America: "Sikhs in America" – Bryan Eber (CNN)**; Born This Way – Jarrod Burt, Jacob Lane, Mac Caudill, Madison Pathe, John Barley, Daysha Broadway, Stephanie Lyra, Svein Mikkelsen, Ryan Rambach, Peggy Tachdjian, and Dan Zimmerman (A&E); Deadliest Catch: "Battle Lines" – Rob Butler, Alexandra Moore, Ben Bulatao, Josh Earl, and Greg Cornejo (Discovery Channel); Life Below Zero: "The 11th Hour" – Eric Michael Schrader, Tony Diaz, Matt Mercer, and Jennifer Nelson (Nat Geo); RuPaul's Drag Race: Untucked: "Untucked" / "10s Across the Board" – Lousine Shamamian (VH1)

=== Production Design ===
Production Design
**Outstanding Production Design for a Narrative Contemporary Program (One Hour or More)**: **The Handmaid's Tale: "June" (Hulu)**; American Horror Story: Cult (FX); The Handmaid's Tale: "Seeds" / "After" / "First Blood" (Hulu); Ozark: "My Dripping Sleep" (Netflix); Twin Peaks (Showtime)	**Outstanding Production Design for a Narrative Period or Fantasy Program (One Hour or More)**: **Game of Thrones: "Dragonstone" (HBO)**; The Alienist: "The Boy on the Bridge" (TNT); The Crown: "Beryl" (Netflix); The Marvelous Mrs. Maisel: "Ya Shivu v Bolshom Dome Na Kholme" (Prime Video); Westworld: "Akane no Mai" (HBO)
**Outstanding Production Design for a Narrative Program (Half-Hour or Less)**: **GLOW: "The Dusty Spur" (Netflix)**; Atlanta: "Teddy Perkins" (FX); Barry: "Chapter Seven: Loud, Fast, and Keep Going" (HBO); Grace and Frankie: "The Tappys" / "The Landline" / "The Home" (Netflix); Silicon Valley: "Tech Evangelist" / "Artificial Emotional Intelligence" (HBO); Will & Grace: "A Gay Olde Christmas" (NBC)	**Outstanding Production Design for a Variety, Reality or Reality-Competition Series**: **Saturday Night Live: "Host: Bill Hader" (NBC)**; Bill Nye Saves The World: "Extinction: Why All Our Friends Are Dying" (Netflix); Dancing with the Stars: "Night at the Movies" / "Halloween Night" / "Season Finale" (ABC); Last Week Tonight with John Oliver: "Episode 418" (HBO); The Voice: "The Blind Auditions Season Premiere" (NBC)
**Outstanding Production Design for a Variety Special**: **Jesus Christ Superstar Live in Concert (NBC)**; The Carol Burnett Show: 50th Anniversary Special (CBS); 75th Annual Golden Globe Awards (NBC); 60th Annual Grammy Awards (CBS); The Oscars (ABC)

=== Sound ===
Sound
**Outstanding Sound Editing for a Comedy or Drama Series (One-Hour)**: **Stranger Things: "Chapter Eight: The Mind Flayer" (Netflix)**; Game of Thrones: "The Spoils of War" (HBO); Homeland: "All In" (Showtime); Star Trek: Discovery: "What's Past Is Prologue" (CBS All Access); Westworld: "Akane no Mai" (HBO)	**Outstanding Sound Editing for a Comedy or Drama Series (Half-Hour) and Animation**: **Atlanta: "Teddy Perkins" (FX)**; Ballers: "Bull Rush" (HBO); Barry: "Chapter Seven: Loud, Fast, and Keep Going" (HBO); Star Wars Rebels: "A World Between Worlds" (Disney XD); Vice Principals: "The Union of the Wizard & the Warrior" (HBO)
**Outstanding Sound Editing for a Limited Series, Movie, or Special**: **Black Mirror: "USS Callister" (Netflix)**; American Horror Story: Cult: "Great Again" (FX); Fahrenheit 451 (HBO); Godless: "Homecoming" (Netflix); Twin Peaks: "Part 8" (Showtime); Waco: "Operation Showtime" (Paramount Network)	**Outstanding Sound Editing for Nonfiction Programming (Single or Multi-Camera)**: **Anthony Bourdain: Parts Unknown: "Seattle" (CNN)**; Blue Planet II: "Coral Reefs" (BBC America); The Defiant Ones: "Episode 1" (HBO); Jane (Nat Geo); The Vietnam War: "Episode 6: Things Fall Apart (January 1968–July 1968)" (PBS); Wild Wild Country: "Part 1" (Netflix)
**Outstanding Sound Mixing for a Comedy or Drama Series (One Hour)**: **Game of Thrones: "Beyond the Wall" (HBO)**; The Handmaid's Tale: "June" (Hulu); Mr. Robot: "eps3.4_runtime-error.r00" (USA); Stranger Things: "Chapter Eight: The Mind Flayer" (Netflix); Westworld: "Akane no Mai" (HBO)	**Outstanding Sound Mixing for a Limited Series or Movie**: **Genius: "Picasso: Chapter One" (Nat Geo)**; The Assassination of Gianni Versace: American Crime Story: "The Man Who Would Be Vogue" (FX); Fahrenheit 451 (HBO); Twin Peaks: "Part 8" (Showtime); Waco: "Operation Showtime" (Paramount Network)
**Outstanding Sound Mixing for a Comedy or Drama Series (Half-Hour) and Animation**: **Barry: "Chapter Seven: Loud, Fast, and Keep Going" (HBO)**; Family Guy: "Three Directors" (Fox); Modern Family: "Lake Life" (ABC); Mozart in the Jungle: "Domo Arigato" (Prime Video); Silicon Valley: "Fifty-One Percent" (HBO)	**Outstanding Sound Mixing for a Variety Series or Special**: **Jesus Christ Superstar Live in Concert (NBC)**; 60th Annual Grammy Awards (CBS); Last Week Tonight with John Oliver: "Episode 421" (HBO); The Oscars (ABC); The Voice: "Live Finale (Part 2)" (NBC)
**Outstanding Sound Mixing for Nonfiction Program (Single or Multi-Camera)**: **Anthony Bourdain: Parts Unknown: "Lagos" (CNN)**; The Defiant Ones (HBO); Jane (Nat Geo); The Vietnam War: "Episode 6: Things Fall Apart (January 1968–July 1968)" (PBS); Wild Wild Country: "Part 1" (Netflix)

=== Special Visual Effects ===
Special Visual Effects
**Outstanding Special Visual Effects**: **Game of Thrones: "Beyond the Wall" (HBO)**; Altered Carbon: "Out of the Past" (Netflix); Lost in Space: "Danger, Will Robinson" (Netflix); Stranger Things: "Chapter Nine: The Gate" (Netflix); Westworld: "The Passenger" (HBO)	**Outstanding Special Visual Effects in a Supporting Role**: **The Alienist: "The Boy on the Bridge" (TNT)**; The Crown: "Misadventure" (Netflix); Gotham: "That's Entertainment" (Fox); The Handmaid's Tale: "June" (Hulu); Mr. Robot: "eps3.4_runtime-error.r00" (USA)

=== Stunt Coordination ===
Stunt Coordination
**Outstanding Stunt Coordination for a Comedy Series or Variety Program**: **GLOW (Netflix)**; Brooklyn Nine-Nine (Fox); Cobra Kai (YouTube); Saturday Night Live (NBC); Shameless (Showtime)	**Outstanding Stunt Coordination for a Drama Series, Limited Series, or Movie**: **Game of Thrones (HBO)**; The Blacklist (NBC); Blindspot (NBC); Marvel's The Punisher (Netflix); Westworld (HBO)

=== Technical Direction ===
Technical Direction
**Outstanding Technical Direction, Camerawork, Video Control for a Series**: **Saturday Night Live: "Host: Donald Glover" (NBC)**; The Big Bang Theory: "The Bow Tie Asymmetry" (CBS); Dancing with the Stars: "Finale" (ABC); Jimmy Kimmel Live!: "Jimmy Kimmel Live in Brooklyn: Billy Joel and Tracy Morgan" (ABC); Last Week Tonight with John Oliver: "Episode 421" (HBO); The Voice: "Live Finale, Part 2" (NBC)	**Outstanding Technical Direction, Camerawork, Video Control for a Limited Series, Movie, or Special**: **Jesus Christ Superstar Live in Concert (NBC)**; 2018 Rock and Roll Hall of Fame Induction Ceremony (HBO); Carpool Karaoke Primetime Special 2018 (CBS); The Oscars (ABC); Super Bowl LI Halftime Show Starring Justin Timberlake (NBC)

=== Writing ===
Writing
**Outstanding Writing for Nonfiction Programming**: **Anthony Bourdain: Parts Unknown: "Southern Italy" (CNN)**; The Defiant Ones: "Episode 1" (HBO); Icarus (Netflix); Jane (Nat Geo); Mister Rogers: It's You I Like (PBS); The Vietnam War: "Episode 8: The History of the World (April 1969–May 1970)" (PBS)	**Outstanding Writing for a Variety Series**: **Last Week Tonight with John Oliver (HBO)**; Full Frontal with Samantha Bee (TBS); Late Night with Seth Meyers (NBC); The Late Show with Stephen Colbert (CBS); Saturday Night Live (NBC)

== Changes ==
In December 2017, the Television Academy announced a few minor changes to some categories.

- The categories Outstanding Special Class Program and Primetime Emmy Award for Outstanding Variety, Music, or Comedy Special were restructured and renamed, the first one as Primetime Emmy Award for Outstanding Variety Special (Live) and the second one as Primetime Emmy Award for Outstanding Variety Special (Pre-Recorded).
- The category Outstanding Costumes for a Period/Fantasy Series, Limited Series, or Movie has been split into Outstanding Period Costumes and Outstanding Fantasy/Sci-Fi Costumes.
- The category Outstanding Directing for Nonfiction Programming has been split as well into Outstanding Directing for a Documentary/Nonfiction Program and Outstanding Directing for a Reality Program.
- The category Outstanding Sound Editing for a Series has been split as well into Outstanding Sound Editing for a Comedy or Drama Series (One-Hour) and Outstanding Sound Editing for a Comedy or Drama Series (Half-Hour) and Animation.

== Wins by network ==
Network	Program	Individual	Total
HBO	4	13	17
Netflix	5	11	16
NBC	1	14	15
CNN	3	5	8
FX	0	7	7
Nat Geo	0	5	5
Hulu	0	4	4
VH1	0	4	4
Prime Video	0	3	3
Fox	0	3	3
Adult Swim	2	0	2
Cartoon Network	0	2	2
CBS	1	1	2
Starz	0	2	2
Apple Music	1	0	1
BBC America	0	1	1
Comedy Central	0	1	1
Disney Channel	0	1	1
Nickelodeon	0	1	1
PBS	0	1	1
TBS	1	0	1
TNT	0	1	1
Vimeo	0	1	1
YouTube	1	0	1

== Programs with multiple awards ==
Program	Awards
Game of Thrones	7
Saturday Night Live	7
Anthony Bourdain: Parts Unknown	5
Jesus Christ Superstar Live in Concert	5
The Assassination of Gianni Versace: American Crime Story	4
RuPaul's Drag Race	4
Atlanta	3
The Crown	3
The Handmaid's Tale	3
Last Week Tonight with John Oliver	3
The Marvelous Mrs. Maisel	3
Queer Eye	3
"USS Callister" (Black Mirror)	3
Westworld	3
Genius: Picasso	2
GLOW	2
James Corden's Next James Corden	2
Jane	2
United Shades of America	2
Will & Grace	2

== Most nominations ==
Shows that received multiple nominations
Nominations	Show	Network
16	Westworld	HBO
15	Game of Thrones	HBO
13	Saturday Night Live	NBC
12	The Handmaid's Tale	Hulu
9	The Assassination of Gianni Versace: American Crime Story	FX
9	Jesus Christ Superstar Live in Concert	NBC
9	RuPaul's Drag Race	VH1
9	The Voice	NBC
8	Atlanta	FX
8	Last Week Tonight with John Oliver	HBO
8	The Marvelous Mrs. Maisel	Amazon Prime Video
7	Barry	HBO
7	The Crown	Netflix
7	GLOW	Netflix
7	The Oscars	ABC
7	Stranger Things	Netflix
7	Twin Peaks	Showtime
6	Dancing with the Stars	ABC
5	The Alienist	TNT
5	American Horror Story: Cult	FX
5	Blue Planet II	BBC America
5	The Defiant Ones	HBO
5	Genius: Picasso	Nat Geo
5	Godless	Netflix
5	This Is Us	NBC
5	Wild Wild Country	Netflix

Nominations by Network
Nominations	Network
76	Netflix
73	HBO
58	NBC
27	CBS
26	FX
21	ABC
16	Amazon Prime Video
16	Fox
16	Hulu
15	Nat Geo
14	Showtime
11	VH1
10	CNN
