= American Cinema Editors Award for Best Edited Non-Scripted Series =

Annual US television award

- Awarded for: Best Editing for a Non-Scripted Series
- Country: United States
- Presented by: American Cinema Editors (ACE)
- Currently held by: Dan Ablett, Kevin Austin, Otto Burnham, Shane McCormack, and Graham Taylor – Formula 1: Drive to Survive (2021)
- Website: americancinemaeditors.org

The American Cinema Editors Award for Best Edited Non-Scripted Series is one of the annual awards given by the American Cinema Editors. The award was first presented at the 2008 ceremony.

- From 2008 to 2012 it was presented at Best Edited Reality Series.
- Since 2013 it is presented under its current name.

== Winners and nominees ==
- † – indicates the winner of a Primetime Emmy Award (Unstructured Reality Program / Nonfiction Program).
- ‡ – indicates a nomination for a Primetime Emmy Award (Unstructured Reality Program / Nonfiction Program).

=== 2000s ===
Best Edited Reality Series

Year	Program	Episode(s)	Nominees	Network
2007
2007	Cops	"Country Love"	Michael Glickman, Chuck Montgomery	Fox
2007	Dancing with the Stars	"Episode 404"	Pam Malouf, Hans Van Riet, David Timoner	ABC
2007	Man vs. Wild	"Everglades"	Mike Denny	Discovery
2008
2008	Greensburg	"The Tornado"	Leonard Feinstein, Phontaine Judd	Planet Green
2008	Deadliest Catch	"Fresh Blood"	Kelly Coskran, Ed Greene	Discovery
2008	Anthony Bourdain: No Reservations	"New Orleans"	Eric Lasby	Travel Channel
2009
2009	Deadliest Catch	"Stay Focused or Die"	Kelly Coskran, Josh Earl	Discovery
2009	Top Chef	"The Last Supper"‡	Annie Tighe, Alan Hoang, Adrianne Salisbury, Kevin Leffler	Bravo
2009	Expedition Africa	"Stanley and Livingstone"	Jonathan Braun, Brad Ley, Sven Pape, Molly Shock	History

=== 2010s ===
Year	Program	Episode(s)	Nominees	Network
2010
2010	If You Really Knew Me	"Colusa High School"	Rob Goubeaux, Jeremy Gantz, Hilary Scratch, Ken Yankee, Mark S. Andrew, Heather Abell, John Skaare, Paul Coyne	MTV
2010	Deadliest Catch	"Redemption Day"‡	Kelly Coskran, Ed Greene	Discovery
2010	Whale Wars	"Vendetta"	Yvette Mangassarian-Amirian, Eric Myerson, Michael Caballero, David Michael Maurer, Edward Salier	Animal Planet
2011
2011	Anthony Bourdain: No Reservations	"Haiti"‡	Eric Lasby	CNN
2011	Beyond Scared Straight	"Chowchilla"	Rob Goubeaux, Paul Coyne, Heather Abell, Audrey Capotosta, Maura Corey, Jeremy Gantz, Molly Shock	A&E
2011	Whale Wars	"Race to Save Lives"	Eric Myerson, Pete Ritchie, Josh Crockett	Animal Planet
2012
2012	Frozen Planet	"To the Ends of the Earth"†	Andy Netley, Sharon Gillooly	Discovery
2012	Beyond Scared Straight	"Oakland County, MI"‡	Rob Goubeaux, Mark S. Andrew, Paul Coyne, Mark Baum, Jeremy Gantz, John Skaare, J.C. Solis, Ken Yankee	A&E
2012	Deadliest Catch	"I Don't Wanna Die"‡	Josh Earl, Alex Durham	Discovery

Best Edited Non-Scripted Series

Year	Program	Episode(s)	Nominees	Network
2013
2013	Anthony Bourdain: Parts Unknown	"Tokyo"‡	Nick Brigden	CNN
2013	Beyond Scared Straight	"The Return of Hustle Man"	Rob Goubeaux, Mark S. Andrew, Paul J. Coyne, Jennifer Nelson, Martin Skibosh, Trevor Campbell	A&E
2013	Deadliest Catch	"Mutiny on the Bering Sea"	Josh Earl, Alex Durham, Rob Butler	Discovery
2014
2014	Anthony Bourdain: Parts Unknown	"Iran"	Hunter Gross	CNN
2014	Deadliest Catch	"Lost at Sea"	Josh Earl, Johnny Bishop	Discovery
2014	VICE	"Greenland Is Melting & Bonded Labor"	Joe Langford, Nick Carew	HBO
2015
2015	Anthony Bourdain: Parts Unknown	"Bay Area"	Hunter Gross	CNN
2015	Deadliest Catch	"Zero Hour"	Josh Earl, Ben Bulatao	Discovery
2015	Whale Wars	"The Darkest Hour"	Eric Driscoll, Nik Jamgocyan, Chris Kirkpatrick, David Michael Maurer, Greg McDonald, Marcus Miller, Alexandria Scott	Animal Planet
2016
2016	Anthony Bourdain: Parts Unknown	"Senegal"	Mustafa Bhagat	CNN
2016	Deadliest Catch	"Fire at Sea: Part 2"	Josh Earl, Alexander B. Rubinow	Discovery
2016	Anthony Bourdain: Parts Unknown	"Manila, Philippines"	Hunter Gross	CNN
2017
2017	VICE	"Charlottesville: Race & Terror"	Tim Clancy, Cameron Dennis, John Chimples, Denny Thomas	HBO
2017	Deadliest Catch	"Lost at Sea"	Rob Butler, Ben Bulatao	Discovery
2017	Leah Remini: Scientology and the Aftermath	"The Perfect Scientology Family"	Reggie Spangler, Ben Simoff, Kevin Hibbard, Vince Oresman	A&E
2018
2018	Anthony Bourdain: Parts Unknown	"West Virginia"	Hunter Gross	CNN
2018	Deadliest Catch	"Storm Surge"	Rob Butler	Discovery
2018	Naked and Afraid	"Fire and Fury"	Molly Shock, Jnani Butler	Discovery
2019
2019	VICE Investigates	"Amazon on Fire"	Cameron Dennis, Kelly Kendrick, Joe Matoske, Ryo Ikegami	VICETV
2019	Deadliest Catch	"Triple Jeopardy"	Ben Bulatao, Rob Butler, Isaiah Camp, Greg Cornejo, Joe Mikan	Discovery
2019	Surviving R. Kelly	"All the Missing Girls"	Stephanie Neroes, Sam Citron, LaRonda Morris, Rachel Cushing, Justin Goll, Masayoshi Matsuda, Kyle Schadt	Lifetime

=== 2020s ===
Year	Program	Episode(s)	Nominees	Network
2020
2020	Cheer	"God Blessed Texas"†	Kate Hackett, Daniel McDonald, Mark Morgan, Sharon Weaver, Ted Woerner	Netflix
2020	The Circus: Inside the Greatest Political Show on Earth	"Who the F*** Are We?"	Barry Blaschke, Michelle Brundige, Charles Divak, Jane Jo, Benji Kast, Stefanie Maridueña, Seth Skundrick, Evan Wise	Showtime
2020	Deadliest Catch	"Mayday Mayday"	Rob Butler, Isaiah Camp, Joe Mikan, Art O’Leary, Ian Olsen, Josh Stockero	Discovery
2020	How To with John Wilson	"How to Cook the Perfect Risotto"	Adam Locke-Norton	HBO
2021	Formula 1: Drive to Survive	"Man on Fire"	Dan Ablett, Kevin Austin, Otto Burnham, Shane McCormack, and Graham Taylor	Netflix
2021	MasterChef: Legends	"Semi Final Pt 3 Chef Showdown"	Roger Bartlett, Matt Cluett, Greg Fitzsimmons, Dylan Hart, Ezra Hudson, James Messina, Rod Schultheiss, Austin Scott, and Molly Shock	Fox
2021	Queer Eye	"Angel Gets Her Wings"	Sean Gill and Nova Taylor	Netflix
