= Ben Bulatao =

American television editor

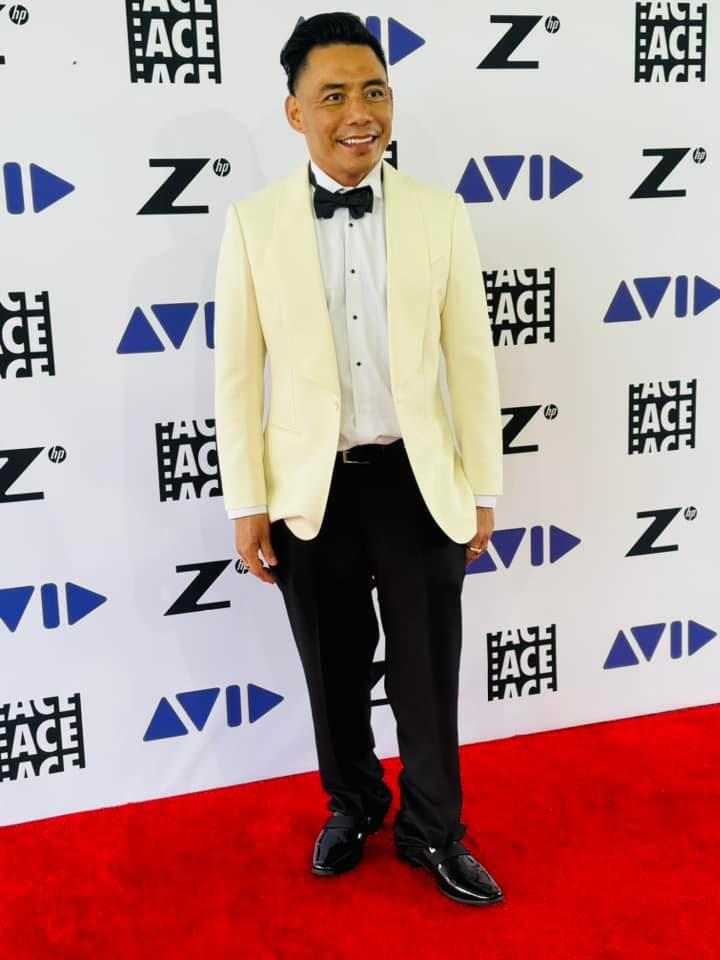
- Ben Bulatao at the 74th Annual ACE Eddie Awards, March 3, 2024
- Born: Benjamin Pascua Bulatao; Milton, Florida
- Occupation: Film/Television editor
- Years active: 2001–present
- Spouse: Jennifer Dalaque Bulatao

Ben Bulatao, ACE, is a Filipino-American film/television editor. He is best known for his work on Deadliest Catch, Coal, Orlando Bloom: To the Edge, and Dancing with the Stars.

Bulatao's work on the Discovery Channel's docuseries, Deadliest Catch, has been nominated six times for the Primetime Emmy Award.

== Life and career ==
Benjamin Pascua Bulatao was born in Milton, Florida to Filipino immigrant parents. His father, Arsenio Bulatao, served in the United States Navy, while his mother, Linda Pascua, worked as a registered nurse.

Bulatao graduated from Carson High School in Carson, California, and went on to earn a Bachelor of Science degree in Biological Sciences from the University of California, Irvine. He is a distinguished member of American Cinema Editors (ACE) and served 2 terms as associate board member. He also contributed to the Media Action Network for Asian Americans (MANAA) as a board member. On March 25, 1996, Bulatao marched alongside Rev. Jesse Jackson and the Rainbow Coalition at the Academy Awards, advocating for greater representation in front of and behind the camera. In recognition of his impact, Blogtalk with MJ Racadio named him one of the “75 Most Influential Filipino-Americans” in 2022, ranking him at #10.

Bulatao resides in Rancho Palos Verdes, California with his wife, Jennifer, and their twin children, Jet and Jordan.

== Selected filmography ==
Year	Title	Contribution	Note
TBA	Bless	Editor	Short film
2025-2026	The Secret of Skinwalker Ranch	Editor	25 episodes
2024	The Voice	Editor	2 episodes
2024	Get Your Story Straight	Editor and producer	Short film
2024	FGirl Island	Editor	3 episodes
2024	Orlando Bloom: To the Edge	Editor	3 episodes
2023-2025	Dancing with the Stars	Editor	20 episodes
2023	Nurse Unseen	Additional editor	Documentary
2023	Search Party With Brandon Jordan	Editor	5 episodes
2023	FBOY Island	Editor	3 episodes
2022	College Hill: Celebrity Edition	Editor	7 episodes
2022	Siesta Key	Editor	7 episodes
2021	The Curse of Oak Island	Editor	4 episodes
2021	Recipe for Change	Editor	1 episode
2009-2021	Deadliest Catch	Editor	58 episodes
2020	Rainshine	Editor	Short film
2019-2020	Floribama Shore	Editor	3 episodes
2018	Into Alaska	Lead editor	9 episodes
2018	Chicken Soup for the Soul's Being Dad	Editor	8 episodes
2018	Jay Leno's Garage	Editor	2 episodes
2012-2017	Bering Sea Gold	Editor	8 episodes
2016	The Yard	Editor	2 episodes
2013	Wild Justice	Editor	1 episode
2013	Are You Tougher Than a Boy Scout?	Editor	3 episodes
2012	Flying Wild Alaska	Editor	1 episode
2011-2012	Storage Wars: Texas	Editor	3 episodes
2011	Coal	Supervising Editor	10 episodes
2010	Black Gold	Editor	7 episodes
2009	Tornado Road	Editor	TV series
2009	Bristol Bay Brawl	Editor	TV series
2007-2009	Ice Road Truckers	Editor	11 episodes
2008	L.A. Hard Hats	Editor	5 episodes
2007	Food Paradise	Editor	1 episode
2007	Plastic Surgery: Before & After	Editor	3 episodes
2007	Biker Build-Off	Editor	1 episode
2007	Soul Mates	Additional editor	Short film
2007	More Crazy Christmas Lights	Editor	TV show
2007	Twister Sisters	Editor	TV series
2006	Primetime Pets	Editor	Documentary
2002-2005	Backstory	Editor	5 episodes
2004	Just the Facts	Editor	Documentary
2004	'Monsterama	Editor	3 episodes
2004	'Monster Nation	Editor	4 episodes
2000-2004	Biography	Editor	11 episodes
2003	'Halloween': A Cut Above the Rest	Editor	Documentary
2003	Sex at 24 Frames Per Second	Editor	Documentary
2003	50 Greatest TV Animals	Editor	Documentary
2002	ShirleyMania	Editor	Documentary
2001-2002	History vs. Hollywood	Editor	4 episodes
2001	The Omen Legacy	Editor	Documentary
2001	Marilyn Monroe: The Final Days	Assistant editor	Documentary
1995	The Scarlet Letter	Editorial intern	Feature film

== Awards and nominations ==
Year	Result	Award	Category	Work	Ref.
2025	Gold	Telly Awards	General-History	Building on History and Legacy: The Filipino-American Experience	
2025	Silver	Telly Awards	Craft-Editing	Orlando Bloom: To the Edge	
2024	Nominated	American Cinema Editors	Best Edited Non-Scripted Series	Dancing with the Stars: "Most Memorable Year Night"	
2021	Nominated	Primetime Emmy Awards	Outstanding Picture Editing for an Unstructured Reality Program	Deadliest Catch : body of work	
2020	Nominated	Primetime Emmy Awards	Outstanding Picture Editing for an Unstructured Reality Program	Deadliest Catch : Cold War Rivals	
2019	Nominated	American Cinema Editors	Best Edited Non-Scripted Series	Deadliest Catch : Triple Jeopardy	
2019	Nominated	Primetime Emmy Awards	Outstanding Picture Editing for an Unstructured Reality Program	Deadliest Catch : Battle of Kings	
2018	Nominated	Primetime Emmy Awards	Outstanding Picture Editing for an Unstructured Reality Program	Deadliest Catch : Battle Lines	
2018	Nominated	American Cinema Editors	Best Edited Non-Scripted Series	Deadliest Catch : Storm Surge	
2017	Nominated	Primetime Emmy Awards	Outstanding Picture Editing for an Unstructured Reality Program	Deadliest Catch : Uncharted Territory	
2017	Nominated	American Cinema Editors	Best Edited Non-Scripted Series	Deadliest Catch : Lost at Sea	
2016	Nominated	Primetime Emmy Awards	Outstanding Picture Editing for an Unstructured Reality Program	Deadliest Catch : Carpe Diem	
2015	Nominated	American Cinema Editors	Best Edited Non-Scripted Series	Deadliest Catch : Zero Hour	
