= Life Below Zero =

- Country of origin: United States
- Original language: English
- No. of seasons: 23
- No. of episodes: 325

Production
- Executive producers: Joseph Litzinger; Scott Sandman; Nick Bunker
- Camera setup: Multiple
- Production company: BBC Studios

Original release
- Network: National Geographic
- Release: May 19, 2013 – February 23, 2025

Life Below Zero (styled as Life Below Zero° on the title card) is a documentary television series that illustrates the daily and seasonal activities of subsistence hunters as they make their living in remote areas of Alaska. Produced by BBC Studios, the show airs on National Geographic.

Each episode pays on average US$2000–4500 to each actor per episode. Some sources call this a reality television series; the people earn money from appearing in it. The show premiered in May 2013, and was cancelled and ended in February 2025.

== Plot ==
The show follows people living in the remote areas of Alaska, surviving off the land, making money through various ventures, as well as dealing with the many different challenges that come with living so remotely in such an unforgiving environment.

== Main characters ==
- Sue Aikens – a 63-year-old (born July 1, 1963) woman and the sole resident of the Kavik river camp in northern Alaska. The camp is located directly adjacent to the Kavik River, 197 miles north of the Arctic Circle. Her motto is "If it hurts, don't think about it."
- Chip and Agnes Hailstone – live with their seven children on the Kobuk River in Noorvik, 19 miles north of the Arctic Circle. Chip lived in Kalispell, Montana, before moving to Alaska. Agnes is Native Alaskan, an Inupiaq born in Noorvik, and is the one member of the cast who has spent their entire life in Alaska, as well as the longest-resident. She has family ties to the land that extend thousands of years and knowledge that has been passed down from generation to generation. Although Agnes is more the focus of the Hailstones' segments, her whole family comes to the screen with her.
- Glenn Villeneuve – moved from Burlington, Vermont, to Alaska in 1999. He lives alone in Chandalar, 200 miles north of Fairbanks, Alaska, and 65 miles north of the Arctic Circle. Later he is joined by his wife and children.
- Jessie Holmes – lives in Brushkana, Alaska, where he is a fisherman, hunter and dogsled racer living alone with his 40 sled dogs.
- Andy Bassich – lives on the Yukon River near Eagle, Alaska, with his 25 sled dogs. He came to Alaska after moving from Washington, D.C., with his wife, Kate Bassich. Andy and Kate divorced in 2016. Andy's girlfriend, Denise, has now joined him at his homestead.
- Erik and Martha Mae Salitan – a young couple, well versed in wilderness living, who live 67 miles north of the Arctic Circle in Wiseman, Alaska.
- Ricko DeWilde – an Alaskan Athabaskan who moves into his family's remote abandoned cabin near Huslia, Alaska. Later, he has his young children visit to begin teaching them about subsistence living.

== Broadcast ==
The show premiered on Sunday night. It switched to Tuesday night beginning in Season 4. It currently shows on Tuesday at 8 p.m. Eastern Time.

== Awards and nominations ==
Year	Association	Category	Nominee(s)	Result	Ref.
2015	67th Primetime Creative Arts Emmy Awards	Outstanding Cinematography for a Reality Program	Oliver Standfast Lynch, Benji Lanpher, Terry Pratt, Simeon Houtman, and Mark St. Marie (for: "Darkness Falls")	Nominated	
2016	68th Primetime Creative Arts Emmy Awards	Outstanding Cinematography for a Reality Program	Mike Cheeseman, John-Thomas Griber, Simeon Houtman, Danny Day, Ben Mullin, and Chris Multop (for: "Breaking Through")	Won	
2017	69th Primetime Creative Arts Emmy Awards	Outstanding Cinematography for a Reality Program	Mike Cheeseman, John Griber, Simeon Houtman, Terry Pratt, Danny Day, and Ben Mullin (for: "Loaded")	Nominated	
2017	69th Primetime Creative Arts Emmy Awards	Outstanding Picture Editing for an Unstructured Reality Program	Ian Richardson, Tony Diaz, Eric Michael Schrader, and Matt Mercer (for: "River of Rage")	Won	
2018	70th Primetime Creative Arts Emmy Awards	Outstanding Cinematography for a Reality Program	Danny Day, John Griber, Mike Cheeseman, Simeon Houtman, Terry Pratt, Rob Gowler, David Lovejoy, and Ben Mullin	Won	
2018	70th Primetime Creative Arts Emmy Awards	Outstanding Picture Editing for an Unstructured Reality Program	Eric Michael Schrader, Tony Diaz, Matt Mercer, and Jennifer Nelson (for: "The 11th Hour")	Nominated	
2019	71st Primetime Creative Arts Emmy Awards	Outstanding Unstructured Reality Program	Travis Shakespeare, Joseph Litzinger, Kevin Tao Mohs, Nicholas Bunker, Scott A. Sandman, Crofton Diack, Daniel Espy, Chris Multop, Rob Pollard, and Brad Carper	Nominated	
2019	71st Primetime Creative Arts Emmy Awards	Outstanding Cinematography for a Reality Program	Mike Cheeseman, Danny Day, David Lovejoy, Ben Mullin, John Griber, Benji Lanpher, and Terry Pratt	Won	
2019	71st Primetime Creative Arts Emmy Awards	Outstanding Picture Editing for an Unstructured Reality Program	Tony Diaz, Matt Mercer, Jennifer Nelson, Eric Michael Schrader, and Michael Swingler (for: "Cost of Winter")	Nominated	
2020	72nd Primetime Creative Arts Emmy Awards	Outstanding Cinematography for a Reality Program	Michael Cheeseman, Danny Day, and Dwayne Fowler (for: "The New World")	Won	
2020	72nd Primetime Creative Arts Emmy Awards	Outstanding Picture Editing for an Unstructured Reality Program	Matt Edwards, Jennifer Nelson, Tony Diaz, Matt Mercer, Eric Michael Schrader, and Michael Swingler (for: "The New World")	Nominated	
2021	73rd Primetime Creative Arts Emmy Awards	Outstanding Cinematography for a Reality Program	Danny Day, John Griber, Simeon Houtman, Ben Mullin, Michael Cheeseman, David Lovejoy, Brian Bitterfeld, Tom Day, Jeffrey Alexander, and Josh Fisch	Won	
2021	73rd Primetime Creative Arts Emmy Awards	Outstanding Picture Editing for an Unstructured Reality Program	Tony Diaz, Matt Edwards, Jennifer Nelson, Eric Michael Schrader, and Michael Swingler (for: "The Other Side")	Won	
2021	73rd Primetime Creative Arts Emmy Awards	Outstanding Sound Mixing for a Nonfiction or Reality Program (Single or Multi-Camera)	Tony Crowe (for: "The Other Side")	Nominated	
2022	74th Primetime Creative Arts Emmy Awards	Outstanding Cinematography for a Reality Program	Danny Day, Michael Cheeseman, and Simeon Houtman (for "Fire in the Sky")	Won	
2022	74th Primetime Creative Arts Emmy Awards	Outstanding Picture Editing for an Unstructured Reality Program	Michael Swingler, Tony Diaz, Matt Edwards, and Jennifer Nelson (for "Fire in the Sky")	Nominated	
