= Primetime Emmy Award for Outstanding Picture Editing for an Unstructured Reality Program =

Television award category

Primetime Emmy Award for Picture Editing for an Unstructured Reality Program
- Awarded for: Outstanding Picture Editing for an Unstructured Reality Program
- Country: United States
- Presented by: Academy of Television Arts & Sciences
- Currently held by: Love on the Spectrum (2026)
- Website: emmys.com

The Primetime Emmy Award for Outstanding Picture Editing for a Structured or Competition Reality Program is awarded to one program each year. This category and Outstanding Picture Editing for a Structured or Competition Reality Program were created in 2016, replacing Outstanding Picture Editing for Reality Programming. Prior to 2006, reality programs competed alongside nonfiction programs in Picture Editing for a Nonfiction Program.

In the following list, the first titles listed in gold are the winners; those not in gold are nominees, which are listed in alphabetical order. The years given are those in which the ceremonies took place:

== Winners and nominations ==
=== 2000s ===
Outstanding Picture Editing for a Structured or Competition Reality Program

Year	Program	Episode	Nominees	Network
2007 (59th)
2007 (59th)	The Amazing Race	"I Know Phil, Little Ol' Gorgeous Thing"	Jon Bachmann, Steven J. Escobar, Eric Goldfarb, Julian Gomez, Andrew Kozar, Paul C. Nielsen, Jacob Parsons	CBS
2007 (59th)	American Idol	"Memphis Auditions"	Bill DeRonde, Gus Comegys, Cliff Dorsey, Ryan Tanner, Oren Castro, Narumi Inatsugu, Tim Perniciaro	Fox
2007 (59th)	Extreme Makeover: Home Edition	"The Thomas Family"	Matt Deitrich, Wes Paster, Tenna Guthrie, Phil Stuben, Jason Cherella, Ben Daughtrey, Hilary Scratch	ABC
2007 (59th)	Project Runway	"Iconic Statement"	Kevin Leffler, Antonia Tighe, Steve Lichtenstein, Drew Brown, Clark Andrew Vogeler, Andy Robertson, Jillian Twigger Moul	Bravo
2007 (59th)	Survivor	"An Evil Thought"	Brian Barefoot, Bob Mathews, Eric Gardner, Chad Bertalotto, Frederick Hawthorne, Tim Atzinger, Evan Mediuch	CBS
2008 (60th)
2008 (60th)	Top Chef	"First Impressions"	Kevin Leffler, Vikash Patel, Marc Clark, Antonia Tighe, Steve Lichtenstein, Susan K. Hoover, Katherine Griffin	Bravo
2008 (60th)	The Amazing Race	"Honestly, They Have Witch Powers or Something"	Steven J. Escobar, Eric Goldfarb, Julian Gomez, Andrew Kozar, Jennifer Nelson, Paul C. Nielsen, Jacob Parsons	CBS
2008 (60th)	Extreme Makeover: Home Edition	"The Hughes Family"	Wes Paster, Matt Deitrich, Tenna Guthrie, Phil Stuben, Jason Cherella, Hilary Scratch, Steve Mellon	ABC
2008 (60th)	Project Runway	"En Garde!"	Jamie Pedroza, Bri Dellinger, Steve Lichtenstein, Andy Robertson, Clark Andrew Vogeler, Laronda Morris, Joe Mastromonaco	Bravo
2008 (60th)	Survivor	"He's a Ball of Goo"	Brian Barefoot, Bob Mathews, Chad Bertalotto, Andrew Bolhuis, Evan Mediuch, Stephen R. Frederick, Eric Van Wagenen	CBS
2009 (61st)
2009 (61st)	Project Runway	"Finale, Part 1"	Jamie Pedroza, Mary DeChambres, Spiro Lampros, Richie Edelson, Maris Berzins, Matthew Moul, Steve Lichtenstein	Bravo
2009 (61st)	The Amazing Race	"Don't Let a Cheese Hit Me"	Eric Goldfarb, Julian Gomez, Andrew Kozar, Paul C. Nielsen, Mike Bolanowski, Jennifer Nelson, Jacob Parsons	CBS
2009 (61st)	The Celebrity Apprentice	"Grave Reservations"	Chris Simpson, Jeff Runyan, Jason Pedroza, Matthew Thomas Blair, Jason Steinberg, Kevin Manning	NBC
2009 (61st)	Extreme Makeover: Home Edition	"The Martirez Family"	Wes Paster, Matt Deitrich, Steve Mellon, Karin Hoving, Arek Hope, Hilary Scratch, Phil Stuben	ABC
2009 (61st)	Penn & Teller: Bullshit!	"New Age Medicine"	Steven Uhlenberg, Ian Sears, Brian Horn, Richard Erbeznik, Tim Sullivan	Showtime
2009 (61st)	Top Chef	"The Last Supper"	Antonia Tighe, Alan Hoang, Adrienne Salisbury, Kevin Leffler, Katherine Griffin, Susan K. Hoover, LaRonda Morris	Bravo

=== 2010s ===
Year	Program	Episode	Nominees	Network
2010 (62nd)
2010 (62nd)	Intervention	"Robby"	Erik Christensen	A&E
2010 (62nd)	The Amazing Race	"I Think We're Fighting The Germans, Right?"	Eric Goldfarb, Julian Gomez, Andrew Kozar, Paul C. Nielsen, Mike Bolanowski, Jennifer Nelson, Jacob Parsons, Rich Remis	CBS
2010 (62nd)	Extreme Makeover: Home Edition	"Extreme Makeover: The Muppet Edition"	Steve Mellon, Wes Paster, Matt Deitrich, Tenna Guthrie, Arek Hope, Karin Hoving, Phil Stuben, Hilary Scratch	ABC
2010 (62nd)	Survivor	"Tonight, We Make Our Move"	Michael Greer, Tim Atzinger, Chad Bertalotto, Andrew Bolhuis, Eric Gardner, Evan Mediuch, Joubin Mortazavi	CBS
2010 (62nd)	Top Chef	"Vivre Las Vegas"	Adrienne Salisbury, Matt Reynolds, Jamie Pedroza, LaRonda Morris, Steve Lichtenstein, Kevin Kearney, Katherine Griffin	Bravo
2011 (63rd)
2011 (63rd)	Deadliest Catch	"Redemption Day"	Josh Earl, Kelly Coskran, Alex Durham	Discovery
2011 (63rd)	The Amazing Race	"You Don't Get Paid Unless You Win"	Eric Goldfarb, Julian Gomez, Andrew Kozar, Paul C. Nielsen, Mike Bolanowski, Jennifer Nelson, Jacob Parsons	CBS
2011 (63rd)	Project Runway	"There Is an 'I' in Team"	Lisa Trulli, Blue, Erik Hammarberg, Josh Franco	Lifetime
2011 (63rd)	Survivor	"Don't You Work for Me?"	Michael Greer, Chad Bertalotto, Eric Gardner, Andrew Bolhuis, James Ciccarello, Evan Mediuch, H.A. Arnarson	CBS
2011 (63rd)	Top Chef	"Give Me Your Huddled Masses"	Kevin Kearney, Laronda Morris, Bri Dellinger, Michael Lynn Sturm, Chris Colombel, Tom Danon, Jeff Nemetz	Bravo
2012 (64th)
2012 (64th)	Deadliest Catch	"I Don't Wanna Die"	Josh Earl, Alex Durham	Discovery
2012 (64th)	The Amazing Race	"Let Them Drink Their Haterade"	Eric Goldfarb, Julian Gomez, Andrew Kozar, Paul C. Nielsen, Mike Bolanowski, Jennifer Nelson, Jacob Parsons, Rich Remis	CBS
2012 (64th)	Project Runway	"My Pet Project"	Lisa Trulli, Eileen Finklestein, Molly Shock, Emily Hsuan, Masayoshi Matsuda	Lifetime
2012 (64th)	Survivor	"Cult-Like"	James M. Smith, Stephen R. Frederick, Tim Atzinger, Evan Mediuch, James Ciccarello, Eric Gardner, David Armstrong	CBS
2012 (64th)	Top Chef	"Fit for an Evil Queen"	Tony Rivard, Chris Colombel, Jeannie Gilgenberg, Hans van Riet, Tony Fisher, Kent Bassett, Matt Reynolds	Bravo
2013 (65th)
2013 (65th)	Deadliest Catch	"Mutiny on the Bering Sea"	Josh Earl, Alex Durham, Rob Butler	Discovery
2013 (65th)	The Amazing Race	"Be Safe and Don't Hit a Cow"	Eric Goldfarb, Julian Gomez, Andrew Kozar, Paul C. Nielsen, Mike Bolanowski, Jennifer Nelson, Jacob Parsons, Andy Castor	CBS
2013 (65th)	Project Runway	"Europe, Here We Come"	Janneke Dommisse, Adrienne Salisbury, Steve Brown, Ryan Mallick	Lifetime
2013 (65th)	Project Runway	"A Times Square Anniversary"	Lisa Trulli, Emily Hsuan, Holly Howard-Brink, John Patrick Nelson, Adrienne Salisbury, Ryan Mallick	Lifetime
2013 (65th)	Survivor	"Zipping Over the Cuckoo's Nest"	James M. Smith, Stephen R. Frederick, Plowden Schumacher, David Armstrong, Evan Mediuch, Tim Atzinger, Bill Bowden	CBS
2014 (66th)
2014 (66th)	Deadliest Catch	"Careful What You Wish For"	Josh Earl, Rob Butler, Art O'Leary	Discovery
2014 (66th)	The Amazing Race	"Part Like the Red Sea"	Eric Goldfarb, Julian Gomez, Andrew Kozar, Paul C. Nielsen, Andy Castor, Jennifer Nelson, Jacob Parsons	CBS
2014 (66th)	Project Runway	"Finale, Part 2"	Julie Cohen, Scott Hahn, Adrienne Salisbury, Eileen Finklestein, Ryan Mallick, Yaffa Lerea	Lifetime
2014 (66th)	Naked and Afraid	"The Jungle Curse"	Emily Hsuan, Chris Meyer, Edward Osei-Gyimah	Discovery
2014 (66th)	Survivor	"Head of the Snake"	Frederick Hawthorne, Joubin Mortazavi, Evan Mediuch, David Armstrong, Andrew Bolhuis, Tim Atzinger, Plowden Schumacher	CBS
2014 (66th)	The Voice	"Episode 601"	John M. Larson, Hudson Smith, Robert M. Malachowski Jr., William Castro, Eric B. Shanks, Jason Stewart, Robby Thompson, Noel A. Guerra, James Muñoz	NBC
2015 (67th)
2015 (67th)	Deadliest Catch	"A Brotherhood Tested"	Josh Earl, Alexander B. Rubinow, Alex Durham	Discovery
2015 (67th)	The Amazing Race	"Morocc' and Roll"	Andy Castor, Julian Gomez, Andrew Kozar, Ryan Leamy, Jennifer Nelson, Paul C. Nielsen, Jacob Parsons	CBS
2015 (67th)	Project Runway	"Finale, Part 2"	Andrea Bailey, James Gavin Bedford, Julie Cohen, Ed Greene, Jensen Rufe, Scott Eikenberg	Lifetime
2015 (67th)	Project Runway All Stars	"Something Wicked This Way Comes"	Mary DeChambres, Carlos David Rivera, Jouvens Exantus	Lifetime
2015 (67th)	Shark Tank	"Episode 608"	David R. Finkelstein, Terri Maloney, Eduardo Martinez, Matt McCartie, Matt Stevenson, Andrew Oliver, Nick Staller, Joel Watson	ABC
2015 (67th)	Survivor	"Survivor Warfare"	Frederick Hawthorne, David Armstrong, Tim Atzinger, Bill Bowden, Evan Mediuch, Joubin Mortazavi, Plowden Schumacher	CBS

Outstanding Picture Editing for an Unstructured Reality Program

Year	Program	Episode	Nominees	Network
2016 (68th)
2016 (68th)	Project Greenlight	"Accident Waiting to Happen"	Steve Lichtenstein, Craig A. Colton, Nena Erb, Dan Golding	HBO
2016 (68th)	Born This Way	"Don't Limit Me"	M'daya Meliani, Chris Ray, Dan Zimmerman	A&E
2016 (68th)	Born This Way	"Up Syndrome"	Daniel Cerny, Peggy Tachdjian	A&E
2016 (68th)	Deadliest Catch	"Carpe Diem"	Josh Earl, Ben Bulatao	Discovery
2016 (68th)	Naked and Afraid XL	"Jungle Rich"	Malinda Zehner, Mike Bary, Todd Beabout, Jacob Parsons, Eric Goldfarb, Mike Levine, Andrew P. Jones	Discovery
2017 (69th)
2017 (69th)	Life Below Zero	"River of Rage"	Ian Richardson, Tony Diaz, Eric Michael Schrader, Matt Mercer	Nat Geo
2017 (69th)	Born This Way	"Dream Come True"	Jarrod Burt, Jacob Lane, Stephanie Lyra, M'Daya Meliani, Paul Cross, Dave McIntosh, Ryan Rambach	A&E
2017 (69th)	Born This Way	"Oh Baby!"	Peggy Tachdjian, Tonya Noll, Jacob Lane, Jarrod Burt	A&E
2017 (69th)	Born This Way	"The Times They Are A'Changin'"	Daysha M. Broadway, Dan Zimmerman, Jacob Lane, Jarrod Burt, M'Daya Meliani, Ryan Rambach	A&E
2017 (69th)	Deadliest Catch	"Uncharted Territory"	Josh Earl, Rob Butler, Nathen Araiza, Ben Bulatao	Discovery
2018 (70th)
2018 (70th)	United Shades of America with W. Kamau Bell	"Sikhs in America"	Bryan Ebber	CNN
2018 (70th)	Born This Way		Jarrod Burt, Jacob Lane, Mac Caudill, M'Daya Meliani, Madison Pathe, John Barley, Daysha Broadway, Stephanie Lyra, Svein Mikkelsen, Ryan Rambach, Peggy Tachdjian, Dan Zimmerman	A&E
2018 (70th)	Deadliest Catch	"Battle Lines"	Rob Butler, Alexandra Moore, Ben Bulatao, Josh Earl, Greg Cornejo	Discovery
2018 (70th)	Life Below Zero	"The 11th Hour"	Eric Michael Schrader, Tony Diaz, Matt Mercer, Jennifer Nelson	Nat Geo
2018 (70th)	RuPaul's Drag Race: Untucked	"Untucked –- 10s Across the Board"	Lousine Shamamian	VH1
2019 (71st)
2019 (71st)	United Shades of America with W. Kamau Bell	"Hmong Americans and the Secret War"	Alessandro Soares	CNN
2019 (71st)	Born This Way		Jarrod Burt, Jacob Lane, Annie Ray, Steve Miloszewski, Malinda Guerra, David Henry, Stephanie Lyra, Dana Martell, David McIntosh, Svein Mikkelsen, Patrick Post, Ryan Rambach, Peggy Tachdjian, Lisa Trulli, Kjer Westbye and Dan Zimmerman	A&E
2019 (71st)	Deadliest Catch	"Battle of Kings"	Rob Butler, Isaiah Camp, Nathen Araiza, Ben Bulatao and Greg Cornejo	Discovery
2019 (71st)	Life Below Zero	"Cost of Winter"	Tony Diaz, Matt Mercer, Jennifer Nelson, Eric Michael Schrader and Michael Swingler	Nat Geo
2019 (71st)	RuPaul's Drag Race: Untucked		Kendra Pasker, Shayna Casey and Stavros Stavropoulos	VH1

=== 2020s ===
Year	Program	Episode	Nominees	Network
2020 (72nd)
2020 (72nd)	Cheer	"God Blessed Texas"	Arielle Kilker, David Nordstrom, Kate Hackett, Daniel McDonald, Mark Morgan, Sharon Weaver and Ted Woerner	Netflix
2020 (72nd)	Deadliest Catch	"Cold War Rivals"	Rob Butler, Isaiah Camp, Ben Bulatao, Joe Mikan, Ralf Melville and Alexandra Moore	Discovery
2020 (72nd)	Life Below Zero	"The New World"	Matt Edwards, Jennifer Nelson, Tony Diaz, Matt Mercer, Eric Michael Schrader and Michael Swingler	Nat Geo
2020 (72nd)	RuPaul's Drag Race: Untucked	"The Ball Ball"	Kendra Pasker, Yali Sharon and Kate Smith	VH1
2021 (73nd)
2021 (73nd)	Life Below Zero	"The Other Side"	Tony Diaz, Matt Edwards, Jennifer Nelson, Eric Michael Schrader and Michael Swingler	Nat Geo
2021 (73nd)	Below Deck	"Steamy Vibes"	Garrett Hohendorf, Cameron Teisher, Michael Sparks, Allison Anastasio, Kimberly Fennik, Josh Franco, Lane Gillis, Tom McCudden and Drew Whitaker	Bravo
2021 (73nd)	Deadliest Catch		Rob Butler, Isaiah Camp, Joe Mikan, Art O'Leary, Alexander Rubinow, Ben Bulatao, Alexandra Moore, Nico Natale, Alberto Perez and Chris Courtner	Discovery
2021 (73nd)	Naked and Afraid	"Sand Trapped"	Todd Beabout, Igor Borovac, Felise Epstein, Eric Goldfarb, Michael Russell, Morgan Stary and PJ Wolff	Discovery
2021 (73nd)	RuPaul's Drag Race: Untucked	"The Bag Ball"	Shayna Casey, Kellen Cruden and Yali Sharon	VH1
2022 (74th)
2022 (74th)	Love on the Spectrum U.S.	"Episode 1"	Rachel Grierson-Johns, Simon Callow-Wright and John Rosser	Netflix
2022 (74th)	Below Deck Mediterranean	"A Yacht in Kneed"	Cameron Teisher, Garrett Hohendorf, Bil Yoelin and Jonathan Anderson	Bravo
2022 (74th)	Cheer	"Daytona Pt. 2: If the Judges Disagree"	Daniel George McDonald, Daniel J. Clark, Zachary Fuhrer, Stefanie Maridueña, Dana Martell, Jody McVeigh-Schultz, Sharon Weaver and David Zucker	Netflix
2022 (74th)	Deadliest Catch	"Five Souls on Board"	Rob Butler, Isaiah Camp, Alexandra Moore, Adrian Orozco, Alexander Rubinow, Hugh Elliot and Chris Courtner	Discovery
2022 (74th)	Life Below Zero	"Fire in the Sky"	Michael Swingler, Tony Diaz, Matt Edwards and Jennifer Nelson	Nat Geo
2023 (75th)
2023 (75th)	Welcome to Wrexham	"Do or Die"	Mohamed El Manasterly, Curtis McConnell, Michael Brown, Charles Little and Bryan Rowland	FX
2023 (75th)	Deadliest Catch	"Call of a New Generation"	Rob Butler, Isaiah Camp, Alexandra Moore, Alexander Rubinow, Ian Olsen, Hugh Elliott and Joe Mikan	Discovery
2023 (75th)	Life Below Zero	"A Storm to Remember"	Michael Swingler, Tony Diaz, Matt Edwards, Jennifer Nelson and Tanner Roth	Nat Geo
2023 (75th)	RuPaul's Drag Race: Untucked	"The Daytona Wind 2"	Matthew D. Miller and Kellen Cruden	MTV
2023 (75th)	Vanderpump Rules	"Lady and the Glamp"	Jesse Friedman, Tom McCudden, Ramin Mortazavi, Christian Le Guilloux, Paul Peltekian, Sax Eno and Robert Garry	Bravo
2024 (76th)
2024 (76th)	Welcome to Wrexham	"Up the Town?"	Michael Brown, Josh Drisko, Michael Oliver, Bryan Rowland and Steve Welch	FX
2024 (76th)	Below Deck Down Under	"The Turnover Day"	Garrett Hohendorf, Addison McCoubrey, Christina Vovas, Noel Williams, Atsuko Atake, Jonathan Provost and Chris Ward	Bravo
2024 (76th)	Deadliest Catch	"Nautical Deathtrap"	Rob Butler, Isaiah Camp, Josh Stockero, Alexander Rubinow, Chris Courtner, Chris Meyers and Alberto Perez	Discovery
2024 (76th)	Love on the Spectrum U.S.	"Episode 7"	Rachel Grierson-Johns, Leanne Cole, Toby Stratmann and Gretchen Peterson	Netflix
2024 (76th)	RuPaul's Drag Race: Untucked	"Rate-A-Queen"	Matthew D. Miller and Kellen Cruden	MTV
2025 (77th)
2025 (77th)	Welcome to Wrexham	"Down to the Wire"	Sam Fricke, Jenny Krochmal, Mohamed el Manasterly, Michael Oliver, Tim Roche, Matt Wafaie, Steve Welch and Tim Wilsbach	FX
2025 (77th)	Deadliest Catch		Rob Butler, Isaiah Camp, Josh Stockero, Alexander Rubinow, Hugh Elliott, Nico Natale, Brock Carter, Christopher James Forrest and Chris Courtner	Discovery
2025 (77th)	Life Below Zero	"The Last Snow"	Matt Edwards, Matt Mercer, Jennifer Nelson, Michael Swingler and Tanner Roth	Nat Geo
2025 (77th)	Love on the Spectrum	"Episode 7"	Leanne Cole, Rachel Grierson-Johns, Gretchen Peterson and John Rosser	Netflix
2025 (77th)	RuPaul's Drag Race: Untucked	"Drag Baby Mamas"	Miguel Siqueiros, Jimmy Bazan and Johanna Gavard	MTV
2026 (78th)
2026 (78th)	Love on the Spectrum	"Episode 4"	Marcus Kjellberg, Leanne Cole, Kim Lloyd and John Rosser	Netflix
2026 (78th)	America's Sweethearts: Dallas Cowboys Cheerleaders		Stefanie Maridueña, Zachary Fuhrer, M Brennan, Noah DeBonis, James Atkinson, Kate Hackett, Deijah Lee-Carroll, Susie Maridueña Barrett, Sharon Weaver and Helen Yum	Netflix
2026 (78th)	Deadliest Catch	"Kings of the Frozen North"	Isaiah Camp, Hugh Elliott, Rob Butler, Josh Stockero, Alexander Rubinow, Nico Natale and Don Pollard	Discovery
2026 (78th)	RuPaul's Drag Race: Untucked	"Red Carpet Mash-ups"	Miguel Siqueiros and Jimmy Bazan	MTV
2026 (78th)	Welcome to Wrexham	"Do a Wrexham"	Michael Oliver, Matt Wafaie, Thomas Czupryna, Asher Glaser, Jenny Krochmal, Mohamed El Manasterly, Stacie Schwarz and Steve Welch	FX

== Programs with multiple wins ==
5 wins

- Deadliest Catch

3 wins

- Welcome to Wrexham

2 wins

- Life Below Zero
- Love on the Spectrum
- United Shades of America with W. Kamau Bell

== Programs with multiple nominations ==
Totals include nominations for Outstanding Picture Editing for a Nonfiction Program.

16 nominations

- Deadliest Catch

8 nominations

- Life Below Zero
- RuPaul's Drag Race: Untucked

7 nominations

- Born This Way

4 nominations

- Love on the Spectrum
- Welcome to Wrexham

2 nominations

- Cheer
- United Shades of America with W. Kamau Bell
