= Born This Way (TV series) =

American reality television series

- Genre: Reality show
- Created by: Jonathan Murray
- Directed by: Laura Korkoian
- Composers: Jeffrey Cain; Eddie Grey
- Country of origin: United States
- Original language: English
- No. of series: 4
- No. of episodes: 35

Production
- Executive producers: Jonathan Murray; Gil Goldschein; Laura Korkoian; Barry Hennessey; Elaine Frontain Bryant; Shelly Tatro; Drew Tappon
- Producers: Sasha Alpert; Rachel Speiser Schwartz; Jarrod Burt; Jacob Lane
- Running time: 43 minutes
- Production company: Bunim/Murray Productions

Original release
- Network: A&E
- Release: December 8, 2015 – December 18, 2019

Related
- Born For Business

Born This Way is an American reality television series produced by Bunim/Murray Productions featuring seven adults with Down syndrome who work hard to achieve goals and overcome major obstacles. The show received a Television Academy Honor in 2016.

On August 22, 2019, it was announced that the series would end with a six-part short form digital series titled Born This Way: Moving Forward which premiered on December 13, 2019. A one-hour linear series finale holiday special, titled A Very Born This Way Christmas, premiered on December 18, 2019.

== Cast ==
- Rachel Osterbach brightens up any room she's in, especially the office of the insurance company where she works. A bit boy crazy, she counts herself among Adam Lambert's biggest fans. Rachel is quick to develop a crush and seeks a serious romantic relationship of her own.
- Sean McElwee is a self-professed "ladies' man." But beneath a seemingly singular focus on "babes" lies a multi-talented athlete and a caring friend. Sean is the focus of three books written by his mother, Sandra, detailing Sean's journey navigating the school system and beyond. With his parents downsizing and moving to a new home, Sean strives to gain greater independence and one day live on his own.
- John Tucker is an entertainer through and through, always expressing himself through his music, writing, and dance. He is a particularly adept rapper, working diligently on his debut album, "JT: The Project." Anchored by his mother, Joyce, his large family supports him in all of his creative endeavors. John seeks to take his music to the next level.
- Steven Clark has a rare form of Down syndrome known as Mosaic Down syndrome, meaning not every cell in his body carries the extra 21st chromosome. As such, he doesn't have all of the same characteristics of a typical person with DS. Growing up, Steven often felt like he was somewhere "in the middle" and strives to fit in.
- Cristina Sanz is a romantic and has been in a relationship with her husband, Angel Callahan, for six years. Her close-knit family hails from Spain, and Cristina enjoys learning the language and cooking traditional Spanish meals. She hopes to continue to take her relationship to the next level and have an independent life with Angel.
- Megan Bomgaars gained widespread notice after creating a video entitled "Don't Limit Me," and now speaks at events around the country, spreading her message of inclusion. She also manages a tie dye clothing company called "Megology." Her mother, Kris, is known as her "Dream Maker," and the two are an inseparable pair.
- Elena Ashmore was born in Japan to a Japanese mother, Hiromi, and an Australian father, Stephen, and this multi-cultural influence has carried throughout her life. She enjoys practicing traditional Japanese Taiko drumming and cooking. Elena has often struggled with accepting herself and her disability. Her personal conflicts inspire the other cast members to examine their own self-images and ideas of what it means to be an adult with Down syndrome.

== Episodes ==
=== Series overview ===
| Season | Episodes | Originally released | |
| Season | Episodes | First released | Last released |
|---|---|---|---|
| 1 | 6 | December 8, 2015 | January 16, 2016 |
| 2 | 11 | July 26, 2016 | September 27, 2016 |
| 3 | 10 | May 16, 2017 | July 18, 2017 |
| 4 | 8 | August 15, 2018 | September 5, 2018 |

=== Season 1 (2015–16) ===
| No. overall | No. in season | Title | Original release date | US viewers (millions) |
|---|---|---|---|---|
| 1 | 1 | "Up Syndrome" | December 8, 2015 | N/A |
In the series premiere, seven young adults diagnosed with Down syndrome meet.
| 2 | 2 | "What's Normal" | December 15, 2015 | N/A |
Rachel and Elena have a conflict, which leads to concern over Elena's behavior. Christina's boyfriend wants to take things to the next level and Sean explores ways to become more independent as his parents prepare to move.
| 3 | 3 | "Dream Makers" | December 22, 2015 | N/A |
Rachel prepares for a date with a crush from drama class; Megan reveals a desire to have a baby, which concerns her mother; John records his first rap track.
| 4 | 4 | "Love and Chromosomes" | December 29, 2015 | N/A |
Friendships are tested as Sean searches for love; Megan looks into making her L.A. visit permanent. The parents begin planning for their children's welfare after they're gone following an emotional lecture.
| 5 | 5 | "Fear and Gears" | January 5, 2016 | N/A |
Rachel is invited to an event by Adam Lambert; Kris copes with Megan's desire to be independent; Steven learns to ride a bike; John tries out a new job.
| 6 | 6 | "Don't Limit Me" | January 16, 2016 | N/A |
Elena continues to struggle to accept herself and Megan tries to help; Cristina's boyfriend plans a surprise for her; Megan says goodbye to her new friends.

=== Season 2 (2016) ===
| No. overall | No. in season | Title | Original release date | US viewers (millions) |
|---|---|---|---|---|
| 7 | 1 | "Game of Love" | July 26, 2016 | N/A |
In the second season premiere, preparations begin for the Down Syndrome Association of Orange County's red carpet ball while Megan heads to Colorado for business. Steven asks Elena to the ball unaware that she already promised to go with John.
| 8 | 2 | "Vegas, Baby!" | August 2, 2016 | N/A |
Sean heads to Las Vegas to see Justin Bieber perform and go on a blind date while his mother challenges him to make his music career profitable. Megan tells her mom she wants to return to California.
| 9 | 3 | "Breaking Away" | August 9, 2016 | N/A |
Life-altering changes surface and impact Megan, Rachel and Elena while they attend an international Down syndrome conference. Sean goes on a parent-free trip to Las Vegas to see Justin Bieber and Cristina chases a life-long dream.
| 10 | 4 | "Rites of Passage" | August 16, 2016 | N/A |
Megan has a health scare while visiting Trinidad for a Down Syndrome conference, forcing her to reexamine her moving plans. Sean considers getting a tattoo after encouragement from a date and Cristina develops a crush on her dance instructor.
| 11 | 5 | "Bachelor Pad" | August 16, 2016 | N/A |
Steven and Sean become roommates so Sean can afford his dream house. John tries out a new song at a fundraiser. Megan heads to L.A. for a job interview and begins planning her future.
| 12 | 6 | "Great Expectations" | August 23, 2016 | N/A |
Megan gets a job in L.A., which disrupts her relationship with Brendan causes concern with her dad. Cristina's jealousy hits new highs and Rachel, Bea and Mariano try to intervene.
| 13 | 7 | "Reality Check" | August 30, 2016 | N/A |
Megan explores L.A. and realizes it isn't all glamour. Rachel learns she is pre-diabetic. Steven and Sean throw a housewarming party, but misunderstood feelings cause things to fall apart.
| 14 | 8 | "Rough Waters" | September 6, 2016 | N/A |
Rachel goes camping and white water rafting with her friends. Angel plans a romantic surprise for Cristina. Megan and Steven learn they have a lot in common.
| 15 | 9 | "Dream Come True" | September 13, 2016 | N/A |
John heads to Atlanta to boost his music career. Cristina has a make or break moment as the day of the Emerald Ball arrives. Brendan visits Megan in L.A. only to find her feelings toward him are changing.
| 16 | 10 | "Oh Baby!" | September 20, 2016 | N/A |
Megan learns about parenting and realizes it isn't easy. Steven admits his feelings about Megan.
| 17 | 11 | "Unlimited!" | September 27, 2016 | N/A |

=== Season 3 (2017) ===
| No. overall | No. in season | Title | Original release date | US viewers (millions) |
|---|---|---|---|---|
| 18 | 1 | "The Times They Are a Changin'" | May 16, 2017 | N/A |
Megan's romance with Brendan is jeopardized by a mutual attraction with Steven. Cristina tries living on her own after completing her independent living classes.
| 19 | 2 | "The Love Boat" | May 16, 2017 | N/A |
The friends take risks and overcome their fears on the high seas, including dangling from a cable 100 feet above a boat's deck. Steven and Megan take the first tentative steps toward falling in love.
| 20 | 3 | "New Man in Town" | May 23, 2017 | N/A |
Rachel tries to pursue acting. Megan and Steven plan a second date, but it goes awry after it turns into a group activity. Sean battles with a tough decision that could impact his future.
| 21 | 4 | "One Giant Step" | May 30, 2017 | N/A |
Megan seeks love advice from Sean and Elena. Elena begins training to be a barista. Cristina signs her lease. Megan and Steven have a romantic third date.
| 22 | 5 | "The Blindside" | June 6, 2017 | N/A |
Rachel gets an audition for a film. John discovers a new side to his father.
| 23 | 6 | "Fallout" | June 13, 2017 | N/A |
The group rally around a friend who suffered heartbreak; Rachel gets a call back for her first film audition. Sean throws a "Man Shower" for his friend and gets help from Fathers and Sons.
| 24 | 7 | "What Love Means" | June 20, 2017 | N/A |
The group discuss love, relationships and sexuality, but Cristina struggles to do so with Mariano and Bea.
| 25 | 8 | "It's Complicated" | June 27, 2017 | N/A |
The group visit a dude ranch hoping for a getaway, but things don't go as planned. Elena finishes her barista training and Angel starts getting cold feet about marriage.
| 26 | 9 | "Homecoming" | July 11, 2017 | N/A |
Hiromi tries to convince Elena to stay. Cristina moves into an apartment of her own. Megan decides if she wants to be single or in a relationship with Sean.
| 27 | 10 | "Red Carpet Wars II" | July 18, 2017 | N/A |
The Red Carpet Ball begins, but Steven shows up with Glee star Lauren Potter.

=== Season 4 (2018) ===
| No. overall | No. in season | Title | Original release date | US viewers (millions) |
|---|---|---|---|---|
| 28 | 1 | "Pursuit of Happiness" | August 15, 2018 | N/A |
Cristina and Angel announce the date of their wedding and begin the process of wedding planning; Rachel asks Megan to be her roommate; John takes the necessary steps towards getting his driver's license. Sean's determination to get a tattoo drives a wedge between him and his father.
| 29 | 2 | "Till death Do Us Part" | August 15, 2018 | N/A |
Powerful emotions are brought up for Cristina and Bea while picking out a wedding dress, forcing them to examine the advisability of her upcoming marriage; Elena desires to take her relationship with William to the next level, but an embarrassing family dinner threatens to derail it all; and Megan and John visit the Chopra Center on a journey to health and wellness.
| 30 | 3 | "Home Alone" | August 22, 2018 | N/A |
Megan and Rachel make the big move into their new place, which presents its fair share of trials and tribulations; Hiromi and Stephen seek out guidance on whether or not they can move back to Japan and leave Elena in the US; Angel and Cristina hit a bump in the road over a misunderstanding about Cristina wanting to date other people; the group boogies down at Drag Queen Disco Bingo, where they meet Elena's new beau.
| 31 | 4 | "Don't Limit Kitty" | August 22, 2018 | N/A |
Cristina and Angel meet with their wedding planner and learn the art of compromise; Rachel celebrates her birthday in Vegas surrounded by friends and family; Megan searches for an additional source of income to further her goal of financial independence and grow her "Megpire."
| 32 | 5 | "One Small Step" | August 29, 2018 | N/A |
Megan and Rachel adjust to living independently while Kris and Laurie struggle to let go; Amy looks to Kris and Laurie for guidance as the Kellers start to teach Rocco independence; Sean finds comfort in his relationship with Caley, all the while, he and Sandra have conflicting ideas on how to run his t-shirt business, "Seanese".
| 33 | 6 | "Joyride" | August 29, 2018 | N/A |
With the help of some cute firemen and a self-defense class, Rachel and Megan learn to stay safe while living alone. They celebrate their Independence with a no drama party; John and Steven get behind the wheel at last.
| 34 | 7 | "Our Best Friend's Wedding" | September 5, 2018 | N/A |
| 35 | 8 | "Our Best Friend's Wedding" | September 5, 2018 | N/A |
Cristina Sanz and Angel Callahan marry.

== Awards and nominations ==
| Year | Award | Category | Nominee(s) | Result | Ref. |
|---|---|---|---|---|---|
| 2016 | Primetime Emmy Awards | Outstanding Unstructured Reality Program | Jonathan Murray, Gil Goldschein, Laura Korkoian, Barry Hennessey, Elaine Frontain Bryant, Shelly Tatro, Drew Tappon, Rowan Wheeler, Sasha Alpert and Rachel Speiser Schwartz | Won | |
| 2016 | Primetime Emmy Awards | Outstanding Picture Editing for an Unstructured Reality Program | M'daya Meliani, Chris Ray and Dan Zimmerman (for "Don't Limit Me") | Nominated | |
| 2016 | Primetime Emmy Awards | Outstanding Picture Editing for an Unstructured Reality Program | Daniel Cerny and Peggy Tachdjian (for "Up Syndrome") | Nominated | |
| 2017 | Primetime Emmy Awards | Outstanding Unstructured Reality Program | Gil Goldschein, Jonathan Murray, Laura Korkoian, Elaine Frontain Bryant, Shelly Tatro, Drew Tappon, Kasey Barrett, Trifari White, Millee Taggart-Ratcliffe, Jarrod Burt and Jacob Lane | Nominated | |
| 2017 | Primetime Emmy Awards | Outstanding Casting for a Reality Program | Sasha Alpert and Megan Sleeper | Won | |
| 2017 | Primetime Emmy Awards | Outstanding Cinematography for a Reality Program | Bruce Ready (for "Rough Waters") | Won | |
| 2017 | Primetime Emmy Awards | Outstanding Picture Editing for an Unstructured Reality Program | Jarrod Burt, Jacob Lane, Stephanie Lyra, M'Daya Meliani, Paul Cross, Dave McIntosh and Ryan Rambach (for "Dream Come True") | Nominated | |
| 2017 | Primetime Emmy Awards | Outstanding Picture Editing for an Unstructured Reality Program | Peggy Tachdjian, Tonya Noll, Jacob Lane and Jarrod Burt (for "Oh, Baby!") | Nominated | |
| 2017 | Primetime Emmy Awards | Outstanding Picture Editing for an Unstructured Reality Program | Daysha M. Broadway, Dan Zimmerman, Jacob Lane, Jarrod Burt, M'Daya Meliani and Ryan Rambach (for "The Times They Are A'Changin") | Nominated | |
| 2018 | Primetime Emmy Awards | Outstanding Unstructured Reality Program | Gil Goldschein, Jonathan Murray, Laura Korkoian, Elaine Frontain Bryant, Shelly Tatro, Kasey Barrett, Millee Taggart-Ratcliffe, Jarrod Burt, Jacob Lane and Jeana Dill | Nominated | |
| 2018 | Primetime Emmy Awards | Outstanding Casting for a Reality Program | Sasha Alpert, Megan Sleeper and Caitlyn Audet | Nominated | |
| 2018 | Primetime Emmy Awards | Outstanding Cinematography for a Reality Program | Bruce Ready (for "Homecoming") | Nominated | |
| 2018 | Primetime Emmy Awards | Outstanding Picture Editing for an Unstructured Reality Program | Jarrod Burt, Jacob Lane, Mac Caudill, Madison Pathe, John Barley, Daysha Broadway, Stephanie Lyra, Svein Mikkelsen, Ryan Rambach, Peggy Tachdjian and Dan Zimmerman | Nominated | |
| 2019 | Primetime Emmy Awards | Outstanding Unstructured Reality Program | Gil Goldschein, Jonathan Murray, Elaine Bryant, Shelly Tatro, Laura Korkoian, Kasey Barrett, Millee Taggart-Ratcliffe, William Jarrod Burt and Jacob Lane | Nominated | |
| 2019 | Primetime Emmy Awards | Outstanding Casting for a Reality Program | Sasha Alpert, Megan Sleeper and Caitlyn Audet | Nominated | |
| 2019 | Primetime Emmy Awards | Outstanding Picture Editing for an Unstructured Reality Program | Jarrod Burt, Jacob Lane, Annie Ray, Steve Miloszewski, Malinda Zehner Guerra, David G. Henry, Stephanie Lyra, Dana Martell, David McIntosh, Svein Mikkelsen, Patrick Post, Ryan Rambach, Peggy Tachdjian, Lisa Trulli, Kjerstin Westbye and Dan Zimmerman | Nominated | |
| 2020 | Primetime Emmy Awards | Outstanding Casting for a Reality Program | Sasha Alpert, Megan Sleeper and Caitlyn Audet | Nominated | |
