= Primetime Emmy Award for Outstanding Cinematography for a Reality Program =

Television award category

Primetime Emmy Award for Cinematography for a Reality Program
- Awarded for: Outstanding Cinematography for a Reality Program
- Country: United States
- Presented by: Academy of Television Arts & Sciences
- Currently held by: The Traitors (2026)
- Website: emmys.com

The Primetime Emmy Award for Outstanding Cinematography for a Reality Program is awarded to one program each year. In 2006, the category was called Outstanding Cinematography for Nonfiction Programming – Multi-Camera Productions. Reality programs competed with documentaries prior to 2006 in a combined category for Outstanding Cinematography for Nonfiction Programming (Single or Multi-Camera).

In the following list, the first titles listed in gold are the winners; those not in gold are nominees, which are listed in alphabetical order. The years given are those in which the ceremonies took place:

== Winners and nominations ==
indicates the winner

=== 2000s ===
Year	Program	Episode	Nominees	Network
2006 (58th)
2006 (58th)	The Amazing Race	"Here Comes the Bedouin!"	Per Larsson, Sylvestre Campe, Tom Cunningham, Chip Goebert, Uri Sharon, Scott Shelley	CBS
2006 (58th)	The Apprentice	"Assault on Battery"	Jim Harrington, Alan Pierce, Jeff Watt, Rodney Chauvin, Tom Magill, Vince Monteleone	NBC
2006 (58th)	Deadliest Catch	"The Clock's Ticking"	Doug Stanley, Marc Carter, Patrick Cummings, Zac McFarlane, Bryan Miller, Scott Simper	Discovery
2006 (58th)	Project Runway	"Clothes Off Your Back"	Tony Sacco	Bravo
2006 (58th)	Survivor	"Big Trek, Big Trouble, Big Surprise"	Mark 'Ninja' Lynch, Michael Murray, Mark Hryma, Derek Carver, Leighton De Barros, Kevin Garrison	CBS
2007 (59th)
2007 (59th)	The Amazing Race	"I Know Phil, Little Ol' Gorgeous Thing"	Per Larsson, John Armstrong, Sylvestre Campe, Petr Cikhart, Tom Cunningham, Chip Goebert, Bob Good, Peter Rieveschl, David Ross, Uri Sharon, Alan Weeks	CBS
2007 (59th)	Dirty Jobs	"Mule Logger"	Douglas Glover, Troy Paff, Christopher Whiteneck	Discovery
2007 (59th)	Intervention	"Sylvia"	Chris Baron, Meri Pritchett, Jamie Hall	A&E
2007 (59th)	Project Runway	"Iconic Statement"	Tony Sacco	Bravo
2007 (59th)	Top Chef	"Seven"	Craig Spirko, Gus Dominguez	Bravo
2008 (60th)
2008 (60th)	Carrier	"Rites of Passage"	Axel Baumann, Robert Hanna, Ulli Bonnekamp, Mark Brice, Wolfgang Held	PBS
2008 (60th)	The Amazing Race	"Honestly, They Have Witch Powers or Something"	Per Larsson, Sylvestre Campe, Tom Cunningham, Lucas Kenna Mertes, Peter Rieveschl	CBS
2008 (60th)	Project Runway	"En Garde!"	Derth Adams, Malkuth Frahm, John Armstrong, Marcus Bleecker, David Vlasits	Bravo
2008 (60th)	Survivor	"Just Don't Eat the Apple"	Cinematography Team	CBS
2008 (60th)	Top Chef	"Finale, Part 1"	Paul Starkman	Bravo
2009 (61st)
2009 (61st)	Out of the Wild: The Alaska Experiment	"What Did I Sign Up For?"	Derek Carver, Michael Applebaum, John Armstrong, Marc Bennett, Eric Freeburg	Discovery
2009 (61st)	The Amazing Race	"Don't Let a Cheese Hit Me"	Per Larsson, Sylvestre Campe, Petr Cikhart, Tom Cunningham, Peter Rieveschl	CBS
2009 (61st)	Intervention	"Chad"	Bryan Donnell	A&E
2009 (61st)	Survivor	"The Camp Is Cursed"	Cinematography Team	CBS
2009 (61st)	Top Chef	"The Last Supper"	Time Spellman	Bravo

=== 2010s ===
Year	Program	Episode	Nominees	Network
2010 (62nd)
2010 (62nd)	Survivor	"Slay Everyone, Trust No One"	Cinematography Team	CBS
2010 (62nd)	The Amazing Race	"I Think We're Fighting the Germans, Right?"	Tom Cunningham, Sylvestre Campe, Petr Cikhart, Peter Rieveschl, Richard Forman	CBS
2010 (62nd)	Dirty Jobs	"High Rise Window Washer"	Douglas Glover, Troy Paff, Carston Bell	Discovery
2010 (62nd)	Man vs. Wild	"Big Sky Country"	Simon Reay	Discovery
2010 (62nd)	Top Chef	"Vivre Las Vegas"	Time Spellman	Bravo
2010 (62nd)	Top Chef Masters	"Masters Get Schooled"	Gus Dominguez	Bravo
2011 (63rd)
2011 (63rd)	Deadliest Catch	"Redemption Day"	Cinematography Team	Discovery
2011 (63rd)	The Amazing Race	"You Don't Get Paid Unless You Win"	Cinematography Team	CBS
2011 (63rd)	Intervention	"Rachel"	Joia Speciale	A&E
2011 (63rd)	Top Chef	"Give Me Your Huddled Masses"	Tim Spellman	Bravo
2011 (63rd)	Survivor	"Rice Wars"	Cinematography Team	CBS
2012 (64th)
2012 (64th)	Deadliest Catch	"I Don't Wanna Die"	Cinematography Team	Discovery
2012 (64th)	The Amazing Race	"Let Them Drink Their Haterade"	Cinematography Team	CBS
2012 (64th)	Project Runway	"The Finale Challenge"	Gus Dominguez	Lifetime
2012 (64th)	Top Chef	"Fit for an Evil Queen"	Ari Boles	Bravo
2012 (64th)	Survivor	"Running the Show"	Cinematography Team	CBS
2013 (65th)
2013 (65th)	Deadliest Catch	"Mutiny on the Bering Sea"	Cinematography Team	Discovery
2013 (65th)	The Amazing Race	"Be Safe and Don't Hit a Cow"	Cinematography Team	CBS
2013 (65th)	Project Runway	"A Times Square Anniversary Party"	Gus Dominguez	Lifetime
2013 (65th)	Top Chef	"Glacial Gourmand"	Ari Boles	Bravo
2013 (65th)	Survivor	"Create a Little Chaos"	Cinematography Team	CBS
2014 (66th)
2014 (66th)	Deadliest Catch	"Careful What You Wish For"	Cinematography Team	Discovery
2014 (66th)	Alaska: The Last Frontier	"Of Moose and Men"	Brian Mandle, Scott Gardner, Neil Moore, David Short, John Whittier, Leif Johnson	Discovery
2014 (66th)	The Amazing Race	"Part Like the Red Sea"	Cinematography Team	CBS
2014 (66th)	Project Runway	"Tie the Knot"	Gus Dominguez	Lifetime
2014 (66th)	Survivor	"Mad Treasure Hunt (Cagayan)"	Cinematography Team	CBS
2014 (66th)	The Voice	"Episode 601"	Alex Van Wagner, Steve Lopez, Adam Tash, Markos Alvarado, Jeffrey Wilkins, Edgar Martin, Graham Steele, Dom Zanghi	NBC
2015 (67th)
2015 (67th)	Deadliest Catch	"A Brotherhood Tested"	David Reichert, Todd Stanley, Steven Wright, Breck Warwick, Matt Fahey	Discovery
2015 (67th)	The Amazing Race	"Morocc' and Roll"	Alan Weeks, Peter Rieveschl, Petr Cikhart, Ryan Michael O'Donnell, Joshua Gitersonke	CBS
2015 (67th)	Life Below Zero	"Darkness Falls"	Oliver Standfast Lynch, Benji Lanpher, Terry Pratt, Simeon Houtman, Mark St. Marie	Nat Geo
2015 (67th)	Project Runway	"The Rainway"	Gus Dominguez	Lifetime
2015 (67th)	Survivor	"Survivor Warfare (Worlds Apart)"	Cinematography Team	CBS
2016 (68th)
2016 (68th)	Life Below Zero	"Breaking Through"	Cinematography Team	Nat Geo
2016 (68th)	The Amazing Race	"We're Only Doing Freaky Stuff Today"	Peter Rieveschl, Alan Weeks, Petr Cikhart, Ryan O'Donnell, Joshua Gitersonke	CBS
2016 (68th)	Deadliest Catch	"Carpe Diem"	David Reichert, Todd Stanley, Steve Wright, Josh Thomas, Shane Moore	Discovery
2016 (68th)	Intervention	"Sierra"	Toby Birney	A&E
2016 (68th)	Project Runway	"Mad Dash Mayhem"	Gus Dominguez	Lifetime
2016 (68th)	Survivor	"Second Chance"	Cinematography Team	CBS
2017 (69th)
2017 (69th)	Born This Way	"Rough Waters"	Bruce Ready	A&E
2017 (69th)	The Amazing Race	"Bucket List Type Stuff"	Peter Rieveschl, Alan Weeks, Petr Cikhart, Ryan O'Donnell, Joshua Gitersonke	CBS
2017 (69th)	Deadliest Catch	"Uncharted Territory"	David Reichert, Dave Arnold, Kelvon Agee, Todd Stanley, Josh Thomas	Discovery
2017 (69th)	Life Below Zero	"Loaded"	Mike Cheeseman, John Griber, Simeon Houtman, Terry Pratt, Danny Day, Ben Mullin	Nat Geo
2017 (69th)	Survivor	"The Stakes Have Been Raised"	Cinematography Team	CBS
2018 (70th)
2018 (70th)	Life Below Zero		Danny Day, John Griber, Mike Cheeseman, Simeon Houtman, Terry Pratt, Rob Gowler, David Lovejoy, Ben Mullin	Nat Geo
2018 (70th)	The Amazing Race	"It’s Just a Million Dollars, No Pressure"	Joshua Gitersonke, Alan Weeks, Ryan Shaw, David D'Angelo, Petr Cikhart	CBS
2018 (70th)	Born This Way	"Homecoming"	Bruce Ready	A&E
2018 (70th)	Deadliest Catch	"Battle Lines"	David Reichert, Charlie Beck, Kelvon Agee, Ben Staley, Josh Thomas	Discovery
2018 (70th)	Queer Eye	"To Gay or Not Too Gay"	Garrett Rose	Netflix
2018 (70th)	RuPaul's Drag Race	"10s Across the Board"	Michael Jacob Kerber	VH1
2019 (71st)
2019 (71st)	Life Below Zero		Mike Cheeseman, Danny Day, David Lovejoy, Ben Mullin, John Griber, Benji Lanpher, Terry Pratt	Nat Geo
2019 (71st)	Deadliest Catch		Cinematography Team	Discovery
2019 (71st)	Queer Eye	"God Bless Gay"	Garrett Rose	Netflix
2019 (71st)	RuPaul's Drag Race	"Trump: The Rusical"	Michael Jacob Kerber	VH1
2019 (71st)	Survivor		Cinematography Team	CBS

=== 2020s ===
Year	Program	Episode	Nominees	Network
2020 (72nd)
2020 (72nd)	Life Below Zero	"The New World"	Michael Cheeseman, Danny Day and Dwayne Fowler	Nat Geo
2020 (72nd)	Cheer	"Hit Zero"	Melissa Langer and Erynn Patrick	Netflix
2020 (72nd)	Queer Eye	"We're in Japan!: Japanese Holiday"	Garrett Rose	Netflix
2020 (72nd)	RuPaul's Drag Race		Cinematography Team	VH1
2020 (72nd)	Survivor		Cinematography Team	CBS
2021 (73rd)
2021 (73rd)	Life Below Zero		Michael Cheeseman, Danny Day, John Griber, Simeon Houtman, David Lovejoy, Ben Mullin, Jeffrey Alexander, Brian Bitterfeld, Tom Day and Josh Fisch	Nat Geo
2021 (73rd)	The Amazing Race	"Give Me a Beard Bump"	Joshua Gitersonke, David D'Angelo, Petr Cikhart, Vincent Monteleone, Ryan Shaw and Alan Weeks	CBS
2021 (73rd)	Deadliest Catch		David Reichert, Jacob Tawney, Shane Moore, Dave Arnold, Nathan Garofalos, Todd Stanley, Bryan Miller, Kelvon Agee, Carson Doyle, Scott Messier, Charlie Beck, Josh Thomas, Tom Trainor, Nate Chambers and Randy Lee	Discovery
2021 (73rd)	Queer Eye	"Groomer Has It"	Garrett Rose	Netflix
2021 (73rd)	RuPaul's Drag Race		Michael Jacob Kerber, Jay Mack Arnette II, Jason Cooley, Pauline Edwards, Ade Oyebade, Mario Panagiotopoulos, Jon "Sarge" Schneider, Brett Smith and Justin Umphenour	VH1
2022 (74th)
2022 (74th)	Life Below Zero	"Fire in the Sky"	Danny Day, Michael Cheeseman and Simeon Houtman	Nat Geo
2022 (74th)	The Amazing Race		Josh Gitersonke, Joshua Argue, Kathryn Barrows, Marc Bennett, Denise Borders, Petr Cikhart, Dave D'Angelo, Chris Ellison, Adam Haisinger, Kevin R. Johnson, Daniel Long and Jeff Philips	CBS
2022 (74th)	Deadliest Catch		David Reichert, Bryan Miller, Kelvon Agee, Charlie Beck, Todd Stanley, Dave Arnold, Nathan Garofalos, Shane Moore, Randy Lee, Jacob Tawney, Sam Henderson, Carson Doyle and Antonio Baca	Discovery
2022 (74th)	Lizzo's Watch Out for the Big Grrrls	"HBCYou Band"	Michael Jacob Kerber	Prime Video
2022 (74th)	RuPaul's Drag Race		Michael Jacob Kerber, Jay Mack Arnette II, Jason Cooley, Pauline Edwards, Mario Panagiotopoulos, Brett Smith, Jeremiah Smith, Justin Umphenour and Jon Schneider	VH1
2022 (74th)	Survivor		Scott Duncan, Peter Wery, Russ Fill, Christopher Barker, Granger Scholtz, Josh Bartel, Marc Bennett, Paulo Castillo, Rodney Chauvin, Chris Ellison, Glenn Louis Evans, David J. Frederick, Ben Gamble, Kevin B. Garrison, Nixon George, Matthias Hoffmann, Toby Hogan, Efrain "Mofi" Laguna, Jeff Phillips, Louis Powell, Erick G. Sarmiento, Dirk Steyn, John Tattersall, Holly Tompson, Paulo Velozo, Ryan Hermosura and Cullum Andrews	CBS
2023 (75th)
2023 (75th)	Welcome to Wrexham	"Do or Die"	Alastair McKevitt, Craig Hastings, Leighton Cox and Jason Bulley	FX
2023 (75th)	The Amazing Race		Joshua Gitersonke, Bryan T. Adams, Kathryn Barrows, Josh Bartel, Kurt Carpenter, David D'Angelo, Matthew Di Girolamo, Adam Haisinger, Robert Howsam, Kevin R. Johnson, Jay Kaufman, Ian Kerr, Daniel Long, Lucas Kenna Mertes, Ryan Shaw and Alan Weeks	CBS
2023 (75th)	Deadliest Catch	"Call of a New Generation"	David Reichert, Charlie Beck, Bryan Miller, Todd Stanley, Shane Moore, Nathan Garofalos and David Arnold	Discovery
2023 (75th)	Life Below Zero	"The Pursuit"	Danny Day, Simeon Houtman, Jason Hubbell, Ben Mullin and Zach Vincent	Nat Geo
2023 (75th)	Survivor		Peter Wery, Scott Duncan, Russ Fill, George Andrews, Tim Barker, Marc Bennett, Paulo Castillo, Rodney Chauvin, Chris Ellison, Nixon George, Matthias Hoffmann, Toby Hogan, Derek Holt, Efrain "Mofi" Laguna, Ian Miller, Nico Nyoni, Paul Peddinghaus, Jeff Phillips, Nejc Poberaj, Daniel Powell, Louis Powell, Jovan Sales, Erick Sarmiento, Dirk Steyn, John Tattersall, Holly Thompson, Paulo Velozo, Cullum Andrews, Christopher Barker, Granger Scholtz, Nic Van Der Westhuizen and Dwight Winston	CBS
2024 (76th)
2024 (76th)	Life Below Zero	"Bulletproof"	Charlie Beck, Michael Cheeseman, Danny Day and Pedro Delbrey	Nat Geo
2024 (76th)	The Amazing Race		Joshua Gitersonke, Bryan T. Adams, Kathryn Barrows, Kurt Carpenter, Petr Cikhart, Diego J. Contreras, David D'Angelo, Matthew Di Girolamo, Rob Gowler, Adam Haisinger, Jamie Holland, Kevin R. Johnson, Jay Kaufman, Ian Kerr, Tim Laks, Regan Letourneau, Danny Long, Lucas Kenna Mertes, Ryan Shaw, Alan Weeks, Stephen A. Coleman and Willie Shipp	CBS
2024 (76th)	Survivor		Peter Wery, Scott Duncan, Russ Fill, Tim Barker, Marc Bennett, Paulo Castillo, Rodney Chauvin, Chris Ellison, Ben Gamble, Nixon George, Marcus Hebbelmann, Derek Hoffmann, Matthias Hoffmann, Toby Hogan, Derek Holt, Efrain "Mofi" Laguna, Ian Miller, Nico Nyoni, Paul Peddinghaus, Nejc Poberaj, Louis Powell, Thomas Pretorius, Jovan Sales, Erick Sarmiento, Dirk Steyn, John Tattersall, Holly Thompson, Paulo Velozo, Cullum Andrews, Christopher Barker, Granger Scholtz, Nic Van Der Westhuizen and Dwight Winston	CBS
2024 (76th)	The Traitors	"The Funeral"	Siggi Rosen-Rawlings and Matt Wright	Peacock
2024 (76th)	Welcome to Wrexham		Craig Hastings, Ed Edwards, James Melrose, Craig Murdoch, Verdy Oliver, Esther Vardy, Leighton Cox, Tom Reece, Gareth Roberts, Joe Clifford, Joby Newson, Mike Staniforth and Dillon Scheps	FX
2025 (77th)
2025 (77th)	The Traitors		Siggi Rosen-Rawlings, Matt Wright, Will Antill, Jack Booth, Alex Bruno, Ned Ellis-Jones, Ollie Green, Quin Jessop, Guy Linton, Joshua Montague, Steve Peters, Paul Rudge, James Spencer, Matt Thomson, Alex Took and Melvin Wright	Peacock
2025 (77th)	The Amazing Race		Joshua Gitersonke, Bryan T. Adams, Kathryn Barrows, Kurt Carpenter, Petr Cikhart, Stephen A. Coleman, Diego J. Contreras, David D'Angelo, Matthew Di Girolamo, Adam Haisinger, Jamie Holland, Kevin R. Johnson, Jay Kaufman, Ian Kerr, Tim Laks, Regan Letourneau, Daniel Long, Lucas Kenna Mertes, Ryan Shaw, Will Shipp, Holly Thompson and Alan Weeks	CBS
2025 (77th)	Life Below Zero		Michael Cheeseman, Danny Day, Jason Hubbell, Ben Mullin, Charlie Beck, Dwayne Fowler, Jensen Walker, Brian Bitterfeld, Jeffrey Alexander, Tyler Colgan, Ashton Hurlburt, Jayce Kolinski and Wayne Shockey	Nat Geo
2025 (77th)	Love on the Spectrum	"Episode 7"	Dave May and Cian O'Clery	Netflix
2025 (77th)	Survivor		Scott Duncan, Peter Wery, Russ Fill, Cullum Andrews, Tim Barker, Marc Bennett, James Boon, Paulo Castillo, Rodney Chauvin, Chris Ellison, Ben Gamble, Nixon George, Marcus Hebbelmann, Derek Hoffmann, Matthias Hoffmann, Toby Hogan, Derek Holt, Efrain "Mofi" Laguna, Kyle McAuley, Ian Miller, Nico Nyoni, Paul Peddinghaus, Louis Powell, Thomas Pretorius, Erick Sarmiento, Dirk Steyn, John Tattersall, Holly Thompson, Paulo Velozo, Christopher Barker, Granger Scholtz, Nic Van Der Westhuizen, Dwight Winston and Kenny Hoffmann	CBS
2026 (78th)
2026 (78th)	The Traitors		Siggi Rosen-Rawlings, Matt Wright, Will Antill, Jack Booth, Alex Bruno, Ollie Green, Quin Jessop, Guy Linton, Scott McKee, Joshua Montague, Hazel Palmer, Steve Peters, Paul Rudge, James Spencer, Matt Thomson, Alex Took and Melvin Wright	Peacock
2026 (78th)	The Amazing Race		Joshua Gitersonke, Bryan T. Adams, Kathryn Barrows, Kurt Carpenter, Petr Cikhart, Stephen A. Coleman, David DAngelo, Matthew Di Girolamo, Chris Ellison, Adam Haisinger, Jamie Holland, Kevin R. Johnson, Tim Laks, Regan Letourneau, Daniel Long, Lucas Kenna Mertes, Will Shipp, Alan Weeks, Scott Shelley, Holly Thompson and Jay Kaufman	CBS
2026 (78th)	Love on the Spectrum	"Episode 4"	Geoff Thomas, Cian O'Clery and Dave May	Netflix
2026 (78th)	Survivor		Scott Duncan, Peter Wery, Russ Fill, Granger Scholtz, Christopher Barker, Cullum Andrews, Tim Barker, Marc Bennett, James Boon, Rory Boon, Paulo Castillo, Rodney Chauvin, Lanza Coffin, Bong Conde, Luke Cormack, Chris Ellison, Ben Gamble, Nixon George, Marcus Hebbelmann, Derek Hoffmann, Matthias Hoffmann, Kenny Hoffmann, Toby Hogan, Derek Holt, Jude Jatau, Dionne Jones, Efrain "Mofi" Laguna, Kyle Mcauley, Ian Miller, Nico Nyoni, Jojo Oducayen, Paul Peddinghaus, Jeff Phillips, Nejc Poberaj, Louis Powell, Jovan Sales, Erick Sarmiento, Dirk Steyn, John Tattersall, Holly Thompson, Nic Van Der Westhuizen, Paulo Velozo and Dwight Winston	CBS
2026 (78th)	Welcome to Wrexham	"Do a Wrexham"	Leighton Cox, Ed Edwards, Verdy Oliver, Tom Reece and Kieren Startup	FX

== Programs with multiple awards ==
7 wins

- Life Below Zero

5 wins

- Deadliest Catch

2 wins

- The Amazing Race
- The Traitors

== Programs with multiple nominations ==
Totals include nominations for Outstanding Cinematography for a Nonfiction Program.

23 nominations

- Survivor

21 nominations

- The Amazing Race

13 nominations

- Deadliest Catch

11 nominations

- Life Below Zero

8 nominations

- Project Runway

7 nominations

- Top Chef

5 nominations

- RuPaul's Drag Race

4 nominations

- Intervention
- Queer Eye

3 nominations

- Born This Way
- The Traitors
- Welcome to Wrexham

2 nominations

- The Apprentice
- Dirty Jobs
- Love on the Spectrum
