= Al Blackstone =

Choreographer

Al Blackstone is a choreographer known for his work on So You Think You Can Dance, for which he received two Primetime Emmy Award nominations and won once for choreography.

== Career ==
Blackstone made his Broadway debut as a dancer in the ensemble of Wicked.

He later choreographed routines for So You Think You Can Dance. In 2018, he received a Primetime Emmy Award nomination for Outstanding Choreography for his work on the series.

In 2020, Blackstone won the Emmy Award for Outstanding Choreography for Variety or Reality Programming for So You Think You Can Dance, with the Television Academy listing the routines “I’ll Be Seeing You,” “Mambo Italiano,” and “The Girl From Ipanema” for the winning entry.

Blackstone has taught at Broadway Dance Center, where he is listed as guest faculty, and Dance Teacher has reported that he taught at Pace University.

In September 2026, the USC Glorya Kaufman School of Dance announced Blackstone as one of its artists-in-residence for the fall 2026 semester.

Blackstone has also served as resident choreographer for Giordano Dance Chicago. His work for the company includes Dumb Luck!, a swing-influenced ensemble piece that premiered in April 2026, and Caravan, a solo created for dancer Sasha Lazarus and presented in November of that year.
