= Jungle Moon =

- Steven Universe episode
- Title Card
- Episode no.: Season 5 Episode 12
- Directed by: Ki-Young Bae (animation); Sue-Hong Kim (animation); Joe Johnston (supervising); Liz Artinian (art)
- Written by: Miki Brewster; Jeff Liu
- Original air date: January 5, 2018
- Running time: 11 minutes

Guest appearances
- Mary Elizabeth McGlynn as Dr. Priyanka Maheswaran; AJ Michalka as Stevonnie

Episode chronology
← Previous "Lars of the Stars"	Next → "Your Mother and Mine"

"Jungle Moon" is the 12th episode of the fifth season of the American animated television series Steven Universe. It first aired on Cartoon Network on January 5, 2018 as the second half of a two-part special, immediately following the preceding episode, "Lars of the Stars". It was directed by Joe Johnston and Liz Artinian and written and storyboarded by Miki Brewster and Jeff Liu. The episode was nominated for an Emmy Award for Outstanding Short-Form Animation.

In this episode, Stevonnie, the fusion of protagonist Steven and his best friend Connie, is stranded on the moon of an alien planet. While there, they have a dream involving a memory of the Diamonds, the leaders of the tyrannical Gem Homeworld. The dream gives the viewer their first look at Pink Diamond, who Steven has been told was murdered by his mother Rose Quartz millennia ago.

== Plot ==
As the episode begins, Stevonnie (AJ Michalka) has just won a battle to defend the starship commanded by Steven's friend Lars (Matthew Moy), disabling the enemy's ship; but Stevonnie's spacecraft is damaged. Out of control, it crash-lands on the alien moon below and explodes.

Stevonnie is unharmed, protected by Steven's magic bubble, and begins to explore their surroundings. In the sky above hangs the planet that the moon orbits; its surface is riddled with huge cavities, as if the planet's mass has been eaten away. They find their spacecraft's radio, but it is too damaged to contact Lars. As they begin to panic, they are attacked by an insect-like alien creature; they fight it off and resolve to survive until Lars can find them. They forage for food and encounter strange plant and animal life. They camp in a cave, cook their food over a campfire, and shave with the blade of their sword.

As they contemplate killing a small bird-like creature for food, the creature's parent attacks them. They escape it by fleeing into an ancient, abandoned tower. That night, they make their camp in the tower and go to sleep.

Stevonnie dreams of being in Connie's home, where Connie's mother (Mary Elizabeth McGlynn) towers over them, scolding someone on the telephone. As Stevonnie attempts to get her attention, it gradually becomes clear that Connie's mother is reenacting the role of Yellow Diamond in an ancient conversation, directing the Gem colonization of a planet. Stevonnie begins playing the role of Pink Diamond, petulantly interfering with Yellow's work and demanding an army and a planet to colonize of her own. When Pink insists, "I'm just as important as you!", Yellow retorts, "Then why don't you act like it, Pink?" Pink storms off and breaks a window in frustration; her reflection in the glass is the viewer's (and Stevonnie's) first look at Pink Diamond's face.

Stevonnie awakens and, exploring the tower further, realizes that it was the site of the conversation in their dream and, like the similar tower on Earth's moon, the headquarters of Gem colonization of the broken planet above. They find the window that Pink Diamond punched, still broken. Stevonnie is able to activate the tower's computer, remembering the activation code from having seen it in the dream, and uses it to contact Lars. Just as the large bird-like creature tries to break into the tower, Lars arrives in his starship and frightens the creature off. As Stevonnie prepares to return to Lars so he can send them home, they contemplate the broken window.

== Production ==
This episode was written and storyboarded by Miki Brewster and Jeff Liu; it was Brewster's first turn as a storyboard artist for the show. The episode was directed by Liz Artinian (art director) and Joe Johnston (supervising director). According to Johnston, the idea of setting an episode on a planet covered with strange vegetation was inspired by a visit to the Huntington Desert Garden near Los Angeles.

Since Steven and Connie spend the entire episode fused, this is the only episode of the series not to feature Zach Callison as the voice of Steven.

== Broadcast and reception ==
"Jungle Moon" was broadcast on Cartoon Network on January 5, 2018, as the second half of a two-episode special. It and the preceding episode, "Lars of the Stars", were promoted under the joint title "Stranded". The "Stranded" broadcast received a Nielsen rating of 0.34, and was seen by approximately 1.1 million viewers.

The episode was favorably received by critics. The Mary Sue's Vrai Kaiser praised both AJ Michalka's performance of Stevonnie, and the execution and implications of the dream sequence. The A.V. Club's Eric Thurm agreed, giving the episode a rating of A−; he especially singled out Michalka's ability to portray both Steven's and Connie's elements of Stevonnie's personality.

Several critics, including Kaiser and Thurm, drew attention to the scene in which Stevonnie grows stubble and shaves, noting its effectiveness in communicating Stevonnie's complex, non-binary gender. Mey Rude at Autostraddle noted that Stevonnie in this episode provided positive representation for non-binary viewers, as a non-binary character with a positive attitude about their body.

The episode was nominated for a Primetime Emmy Award for Outstanding Short-Form Animated Program in 2018. Although it did not win that award, background painter Patrick Bryson won a juried Emmy Award for Outstanding Individual Achievement in Animation for his work on this episode.
