= United Shades of America =

Television series

- Presented by: W. Kamau Bell
- Country of origin: United States
- Original language: English
- No. of seasons: 7
- No. of episodes: 54

Original release
- Network: CNN
- Release: April 24, 2016 – August 20, 2022

United Shades of America is an American documentary television series presented by comedian W. Kamau Bell. Throughout the series Bell visits various communities across America to understand the challenges they face. The show was named Outstanding Unstructured Reality Program at the 69th, 70th, and 71st Emmy Awards.

United Shades of America premiered on CNN on April 24, 2016 and ended on August 20, 2022, with a total of 54 episodes over the course of 7 seasons .

== Episodes ==
=== Series overview ===
Season	Episodes	Originally released	
Season	Episodes	First released	Last released
1	8	April 24, 2016	June 12, 2016
2	8	April 30, 2017	July 2, 2017
3	8	April 29, 2018	July 1, 2018
4	8	April 28, 2019	June 19, 2019
5	8	July 19, 2020	August 30, 2020
6	7	May 2, 2021	June 13, 2021
7	7	July 10, 2022	August 21, 2022

=== Season 1 (2016) ===
No. overall	No. in season	Title	Original release date
1	1	"The New KKK"	April 24, 2016
Despite their dwindling numbers over the decades, the notorious white supremacist group, the Ku Klux Klan, seek to reignite the flames of white power with a new message; W. Kamau Bell heads to the South to speak to KKK members.
2	2	"Behind These Walls"	May 1, 2016
W. Kamau Bell speaks to prisoners of the infamous San Quentin prison to hear their individual, real stories about life inside the prison and what it has turned them into.
3	3	"Latino, USA"	May 8, 2016
The population of East Los Angeles is over 90 percent Latino; they are predicted to be the majority population of Americans by 2044; W. Kamau Bell speaks to many Latinos who are fighting prejudice and spreading the message of tolerance.
4	4	"Protect and Serve?"	May 15, 2016
Camden, New Jersey has a reputation as one of the country's most dangerous cities; W. Kamau Bell heads there to see if a newly implemented community policing program is helping the relationship between citizens and the police force.
5	5	"Off the Grid"	May 22, 2016
W. Kamau Bell visits people in North Carolina and Tennessee who are living completely off the grid; inside the tiny house movement; legendary Summer of Love commune, The Farm; doomsday prepper who refuses to be identified.
6	6	"Is It Cool to Be Hip?"	May 29, 2016
W. Kamau Bell is off to speak to the people of Portland, Oregon where the result of a massive influx of hipsters appears to be gentrification; he inquires as to how this has affected the local neighborhoods.
7	7	"The Last Frontier"	June 5, 2016
W. Kamau Bell visits the Inuit of Barrow, Alaska, 320 miles north of the Arctic Circle, where this town, only accessible by plane, is fighting to hold on to its traditions as large companies seek to acquire their natural resources.
8	8	"The Fountain of Youth"	June 12, 2016
W. Kamau Bell talks to the retirees and college age spring breakers of Daytona, Florida to inquire what makes this part of the country so appealing to people from all walks of life.

=== Season 2 (2017) ===
No. overall	No. in season	Title	Original release date
9	1	"Immigrants and Refugees"	April 30, 2017
W. Kamau Bell enjoys an abundant cross-section of immigrants who come to this country from all over the world to make a better life.
10	2	"Chicago Gangs"	May 7, 2017
W. Kamau Bell goes to the heart of Chicago gang territory to explore the truth about crime in the city.
11	3	"Native Americans"	May 14, 2017
Kamau goes to the Dakotas to bring light onto the indigenous people mistakenly called Native Americans.
12	4	"Muslims in Small-Town America"	May 21, 2017
W. Kamau Bell meets Muslims in Michigan who are eager to explain that practitioners of Islam are not what people assume they are.
13	5	"Kamau Buys a Gun"	June 4, 2017
W. Kamau Bell, a critic of gun laws in America, buys a 357 Magnum.
14	6	"Puerto Ricans and Puerto Rico"	June 11, 2017
W. Kamau Bell unlocks some of the myths of Puerto Ricans; a journey from New York City to Puerto Rico itself.
15	7	"Appalachian Coal Country"	June 25, 2017
The Appalachian region has a rich history and optimism, despite being one of the hardest-hit countries economically; W. Kamau Bell plans to mine.
16	8	"It's Chinatown!"	July 2, 2017
W. Kamau Bell visits San Francisco's Chinatown; what it means to be American while culturally connected to another country.

=== Season 3 (2018) ===
No. overall	No. in season	Title	Original release date
17	1	"The Border"	April 29, 2018
W. Kamau Bell heads to the U.S.-Mexico border to find out what life is like for the people who live there.
18	2	"Sikhs in America"	May 6, 2018
W. Kamau Bell unravels the stereotypes of one of the most misunderstood religions in America.
19	3	"The South Carolina Gullah"	May 13, 2018
W. Kamau Bell visits the coast of South Carolina to meet the Gullah Geechee people.
20	4	"The Disability Community"	May 20, 2018
W. Kamau Bell meets with people with physical disabilities.
21	5	"HBCU's"	June 3, 2018
W. Kamau Bell heads to historically black colleges and universities to answer the question on why these schools are important.
22	6	"Sweet Home Alabama"	June 17, 2018
W. Kamau Bell heads south to debunk some myths while also retracing his family roots with his father.
23	7	"The Canadian Way"	June 24, 2018
W. Kamau Bell takes a trip up north to Canada to see if everything is truly as great as everyone says.
24	8	"Native Hawaii"	July 1, 2018
W. Kamau Bell visits the islands of Hawaii to talk to natives.

=== Season 4 (2019) ===
No. overall	No. in season	Title	Original release date
25	1	"Megachurches"	April 28, 2019
Kamau visits Dallas, the home of the megachurch, to find out what is creating the new face of Christianity today in a city where church and state are far from separate.
26	2	"Not All White people"	May 5, 2019
While in and around Seattle, Kamau takes a look at different forms of activism that white people are using to combat America's history of white supremacy and the rise of extreme right-wing groups across the country.
27	3	"Hmong Americans and the Secret War"	May 12, 2019
Kamau meets members of the Hmong community brought to America after the Laotian Civil War forced their expulsion, and learns the multigenerational stories of loss, perseverance and hope that make up their American journey. Part of the episode is in Hmongtown Marketplace.
28	4	"Body Politics"	May 19, 2019
Kamau visits Jackson, Miss., to explore the divisive world of reproductive rights and reproductive justice, including abortion, sex education and women's health.
29	5	"The Real D.C."	May 26, 2019
Kamau takes a look at Washington, D.C., through the eyes of residents who show him the vibrant culture that is distinct from the politics that surround it.
30	6	"Out and Proud Salt Lake"	June 2, 2019
Kamau visits Salt Lake City to explore the growing LGBTQ community living in the epicenter of the Mormon faith.
31	7	"livingwhileblack"	June 9, 2019
Kamau visits Milwaukee, the most segregated city in America, to better understand why living as a black person in America can be so challenging.
32	8	"Toxic America"	June 16, 2019
Kamau visits Philadelphia and Chester, Pa., to learn about the toxic man-made disasters that have polluted these communities for generations.

=== Season 5 (2020) ===
No. overall	No. in season	Title	Original release date
33	1	"Where do we even start with White Supremacy?"	July 19, 2020
White supremacy in America, explains how our new war collided with an old fight and put Black Americans on the front lines. We're living in a perfect storm for extremist recruitment. Five questions on America's racial reckoning. The one word that Tree of Life's rabbi refuses to say.
34	2	"All-American Family Farms"	July 26, 2020
Kamau heads to Oklahoma to explore how politics and economic disparity are impacting families and independent farmers.
35	3	"Going to Public School"	August 2, 2020
Kamau explores inequities in the public education system through two very different school districts near Cleveland, Ohio.
36	4	"The Gig Economy"	August 9, 2020
Across the United States, the fastest-growing category of new jobs is gig work, spurred on by tech companies and their never-ending stream of apps; low and uncertain incomes have replaced benefits.
37	5	"The Time For Reparations"	August 16, 2020
Kamau heads to New Orleans to explore reparations; acknowledging the scale and scope of slavery.
38	6	"Venezuelans In Florida"	August 23, 2020
Kamau heads to South Florida, home of the largest number of Venezuelans in the United States, to understand the crisis that led them to seek asylum.
39	7	"The Homeless Crisis In L.A."	August 30, 2020
Kamau spends time on the notorious Skid Row in Los Angeles and explores its racial, socio-economic and statistical dynamics.
40	8	"Iranian-Americans In N.Y."	August 30, 2020
Kamau visits New York City to talk to recent Iranian immigrants and those who came here decades ago.

=== Season 6 (2021) ===
No. overall	No. in season	Title	Original release date
41	1	"Policing The Police"	May 2, 2021
Kamau examines the history and current state of policing in America through the eyes of activists, organizers, politicians, victims and police themselves in his hometown of Oakland, California and the Bay Area.
42	2	"Black To The Future"	May 9, 2021
Kamau visits Atlanta and digs deep into the discrimination and racism that lingers in programs like STEM; he looks at efforts to build a more inclusive workforce for the globally competitive future in technology and space.
43	3	"Power Of Protest"	May 16, 2021
Kamau visits Portland, Oregon to better understand the nature of the city's protests in 2020 and speaks with protestors to learn about the status of the progress made.
44	4	"The Wealth Gap"	May 23, 2021
Kamau visits Charleston and North Charleston, South Carolina to discuss the ongoing American wealth gap by examining job insecurity among millennials, food insecurity, wage disparity, housing insecurity, and tax policy.
45	5	"Thank You For Your Service"	May 30, 2021
Kamau spends time speaking with military veterans in San Diego to examine how the military is beset by the same destructive forces that keep the U.S. divided as a nation.
46	6	"The Color Of America"	June 6, 2021
Kamau goes to Philadelphia to explore the shifting ethnic makeup of the U.S. in a celebratory exploration of an increasingly robust mixed-race population and the ways in which they are changing and challenging the culture.
47	7	"Trans in Texas"	June 13, 2021
Kamau visits Dallas to speak with members of the Black transgender community and examine the struggles they continue to face in the wake of hate crimes, lack of access to resources, and legislation targeting the community.

=== Season 7 (2022) ===
No. overall	No. in season	Title	Original release date
48	1	"The Woke War"	July 10, 2022
Kamau visits Arizona, on the front lines of a culture war, where the term “woke” has become a fight for control of the nation’s future. Kamau talks with parents and educators to hear both sides of CRT and how it is being used as a weapon.
49	2	"Black in Appalachia"	July 17, 2022
The Appalachians are usually pictured as White working-class Americans. A large population of Black Americans has called it home since the time of the conquistadors.
50	3	"Athletes and the Cost of Winning"	July 24, 2022
While sports can be exhilarating, they come with intensity and pressure that can compromise athletes’ mental health. Kamau heads to the legendary sports town of Boston to find out how athletes are speaking up and leading change.
51	4	"California is Burning"	July 31, 2022
Years of drought and extreme heat waves in California have seen wildfires grow in frequency, intensity and size. The crisis is fueled by mismanagement of land, corporate greed and climate change. How do we learn to coexist with wildfire?
52	5	"Asian Americans in the Spotlight"	August 7, 2022
Through interviews with Asian American celebrities, Kamau traces the history of negative stereotypes and the portrayals of Asian Americans in comedy, examining how stereotypes contributed to violence and racism towards Asian Americans.
53	6	"The Landback Movement"	August 14, 2022
Kamau travels to the Black Hills of South Dakota, known for millennia to Native people as “the heart of everything that is.” Native leaders explain the Landback Campaign and demand the USA honor its treaties and return all public lands.
54	7	"Hawaii for Hawaiians"	August 21, 2022
Encouraged by the state, mainlanders flocked to Hawaii in the pandemic. But, Native Hawaiians are now begging people to stop visiting and moving to Hawaii, where the rising cost of living makes it the most expensive state in the country.
