= Love on the Spectrum =

Love on the Spectrum may refer to:

- Love on the Spectrum (Australian TV series), a 2019–2021 reality series
- Love on the Spectrum (American TV series), a reality series since 2022
