= Terri Garber =

American actress and entrepreneur (born 1960)

- Born: Terri Leslie Garber; December 28, 1960 (age 65); Miami, Florida, U.S.
- Occupations: Actress, entrepreneur
- Years active: 1979–present
- Known for: North and South; North and South: Book II; Dynasty; As the World Turns; Santa Barbara; Texas
- Spouses: Chris Hager (m. 1985; div. 1989) Frank Howson (m. 2001; div. 2002) William Roudebush (m. 2013; div. 2025)
- Children: 1
- Website: sistersalchemy.com

Terri Leslie Garber (born December 28, 1960) is an American actress and entrepreneur.

== Career ==
Garber's acting debut was as Allison Linden on the daytime soap opera Texas in 1982. Her first feature film role in the 1984 action film Toy Soldiers.

Garber's breakout role was wicked Southern belle Ashton Main in the 1985 ABC miniseries North and South, based on the 1982 novel of the same name by John Jakes. As of 2002, it was still ranked among the ten highest rated miniseries in TV history. Garber reprised the role for the 1986 sequel miniseries, North and South: Book II, as well as for the 1994 final installment, Heaven and Hell: North and South Book III. In 1987, she described Ashton:

[Ashton was] the meanest of the mean, but she did it all with a smile so you couldn't really hate her. She was fun. She slept with seven West Point men, one after another, and was in on a plot to assassinate Jefferson Davis. People still come up to me in airports and comment on that, laughing—about the West Pointers, not about trying to kill Davis.

Garber portrayed the role of Leslie Carrington on the primetime soap Dynasty from 1987–88. She appeared alone on the cover of TV Guide for the September 5, 1987 issue (#1797), which included an interview with her. After Dynasty, Garber made guest appearances in various series including Quantum Leap, Murder She Wrote and Midnight Caller, and appeared in the Australian film Beyond My Reach (1990). In the 1990s, she landed roles in two daytime soap operas: Suzanne Collier on Santa Barbara from 1991–92 and Victoria Parker on General Hospital in 1993. Garber later portrayed the recurring role of Iris Dumbrowski on the daytime soap opera As the World Turns in 2005, returning from November 2006-10.

In 2012, Garber appeared as Elizabeth Archer in the series finale of the teen drama web series Miss Behave. She later won a 2013 Indie Soap Award for Best Guest Appearance in a Drama for the performance.

In 2013, Garber played a therapist on the web series Old Dogs & New Tricks (Season 2, Episode 10: "Last Gasps").

== Personal life ==
Garber grew up in Miami, the youngest of three children of a lawyer father and a cooking-school owner mother. She did some modeling from ages 4 to 13, and always wanted to be a performer. Garber told TV Guide in 1987 that she chose acting over singing because "I was too nervous to sing in front of people—it meant showing more of myself than acting. If you're on stage singing and people don't like it, that's too much rejection." She later moved to New York, where her casual drug use became what she called "a huge problem". She overcame the addiction before being cast in North and South.

Garber met her first husband, screenwriter Christopher "Chris" Hager, when he was working as a grip on the set of North and South: Book II in 1985. She and Hager are the parents of actress and singer Molly E. Hager (b. 1986). That union ended in divorce in 1989. Her second marriage, to Frank Michael Howson (July 21, 2001 – June 24, 2002), also ended in divorce. In 2013, Garber married director William Roudebush, her former high school drama teacher that she had once been engaged to when she was age 17.They divorced in 2025. Garber lives in New York City with her Maltese-poodle mix, Boo.

Garber and her sister Lisa Garber Rubenstein began a business handmaking all-natural soap in various scents and styles, known as SistersAlchemy.

== Filmography ==
=== Film ===
Year	Title	Role	Notes
1984	Toy Soldiers	Amy	film debut
1985	Key Exchange	Amy	
1990	Beyond My Reach	Terri Neilson	
1998	Slappy and the Stinkers	Mrs. Witzowitz	
2001	Thank You, Good Night	Sultry Older Woman	
2005	Adam and Eve	Eve's Mom	
2010	Perhaps Tomorrow	Annie	Short film

=== Television ===
Year	Title	Role	Notes
1982	Texas	Allison Linden	Episode: "#1.612"
1983	Mr. Smith	Dr. Judy Tyson	Series regular; 13 episodes
1983	Lone Star	Deputy Cissy Wells	Television movie
1984	No Man's Land	Brianne Wilder	Television movie
1985	North and South Book I	Ashton Main	Television miniseries
1986	North and South Book II	Ashton Main	Television miniseries
1987–1988	Dynasty	Leslie Carrington	Series regular; 36 episodes
1988	The Twilight Zone	Debra Brockman	Episode: "Our Selena Is Dying"
1989	Quantum Leap	Teresa Pacci	Episode: "Double Identity"
1989	Murder, She Wrote	Loretta Lee	Episode: "Three Strikes, You're Out"
1989	My Two Dads	Karen Martin	2 episodes
1989	Matlock	Valerie Walsh	Episode: "The Fugitive"
1990	Sporting Chance	Hoop Tracy	Television movie
1990	Jake and the Fatman	Casey Quinn	Episode: "Night and Day"
1990	Shades of LA	Julie	Episode: "Big Brother Is Watching"
1991	Midnight Caller	Kate Killian	Episode: "The Loneliest Number"
1991–1992	Santa Barbara	Suzanne Collier	Series regular
1993	Raven	Jennifer	Episode: "Bloody Beach"
1993	General Hospital	Victoria Parker	7 episodes
1994	North and South Book III	Ashton Main	Television miniseries (3 episodes)
1995	Bless This House	Mrs. Rasmussen	Episode: "Neither a Borrower Nor a Landlord Be"
1996	Renegade	Lisa Corcoran	Episode: "The Road Not Taken"
1996	Charlie Grace	Ruby O'Conner	Episode: "Steal One for the Gipper"
1999	7th Heaven	Dr. Nancy Burns	Episode: "Forget Me Not"
2001	ER	Dr. Alexander	Episode: "Survival of the Fittest"
2001	Judging Amy	Toni Eggers	Episode: "Look Closer"
2001	Family Law	40-Year-Old Woman	Episode: "Sex, Lies, and Internet"
2004	Cold Case	Abbey Lake	Episode: "Late Returns"
2005–2010	As the World Turns	Iris Dumbrowski	Series regular
2006	Law & Order	Mrs. Carroll	Episode: "In Vino Veritas"
2010	Law & Order: Criminal Intent	Mrs. Becker	Episode: "Inhumane Society"
2012	Miss Behave	Elizabeth Archer	Web series/Episode: "Goodbye, for Now: Part 3"; Indie Series Award for Best Guest Appearance (Drama)
2013	Old Dogs & New Tricks	Dr. Leslie Ashley	Episode: "Last Gasps"
2014	SnakeHead Swamp	Carley	Television movie
