= Employable Me =

Employable Me may refer to:

- Employable Me, a 2016 British TV series on BBC Two
- Employable Me (Canadian TV series), a 2017 Canadian TV series
- Employable Me (Australian TV series), a 2018 Australian TV series
