= NECC =

NECC may refer to:

== Organizations ==
- National Egg Coordination Committee, an association of poultry farmers in India
- National Esports Collegiate Conference, U.S. collegiate esports organization
- Navy Expeditionary Combat Command, unit of the United States Navy
- New England Center for Children, school for children with autism in Southborough, Massachusetts
- New England Collegiate Conference, NCAA Division III athletic conference
- New England Compounding Center, pharmaceutical company involved in a 2012 contamination outbreak
- Northern Essex Community College, public community college in Massachusetts
- Northeastern Correctional Center, minimum and pre-release facility housing criminally sentenced males

== Science and technology ==
- Net-Enabled Command Capability, U.S. Department of Defense information-sharing project
- North Equatorial Countercurrent, ocean current in the Atlantic and Pacific Oceans

== Other uses ==
- New England clam chowder
- NECC, the Delhi Metro station code for Noida Electronic City metro station, Uttar Pradesh, India

== See also ==
- Necco, originally the New England Confectionery Company
