= Madison Marilla =

American TV personality (born 1997)

- Born: Madison Marilla; September 22, 1997 (age 28); North Carolina, U.S.
- Education: Western New England University (BA)
- Occupations: TV personality; social media content creator; Elementary school student activities director
- Years active: 2025–present (as a TV personality)
- Parents: Jenny Marilla; Brennan Marilla

Madison Marilla (born September 22, 1997) is an American autistic television personality, social media content creator and former elementary school special education student activities director.

She is best known for appearing on seasons 3 and 4 of Netflix's Love on the Spectrum.

== Early life and education ==
Madison Marilla was born on September 22, 1997 in North Carolina. She is the daughter of Jenny Marilla and Brennan Marilla. She also has one younger brother. Marilla and her family moved to Santa Rosa, California after her father got a job there. She repeated the eighth grade after moving to Massachusetts.

Marilla was diagnosed with autism at age 2. Doctors told Marilla's parents she would never be able to speak or attend a mainstream school. Marilla was subsequently enrolled in speech therapy, occupational therapy, applied behavior analysis (ABA), and social skills training. Marilla spoke for the first time at age 4. She was diagnosed at age 6 with OCD, ADHD and generalized anxiety disorder.

In high school, Marilla created an autism awareness club.

Marilla graduated from Western New England University in 2020 with a Bachelor of Arts in psychology; she also minored in art. Her studies were largely focused on special education and ABA.

== Career ==
In high school, a mentor inspired Marilla to also become a mentor to autistic kids. She later became a mentor for autistic children in school and home-based settings, as well as a social skills group instructor at an after-school and weekend program.

After graduating from college, she worked at several elementary schools in Massachusetts in various special education roles, including as a student activities director.

Prior to appearing on Love on the Spectrum, she was a big fan of the show, having watched the first two seasons of the American version, as well as the original Australian version. Ahead of season 2, while Marilla was living in Massachusetts, the show reached out to a life program she was a part of, about her appearing on the show. However she felt the timing wasn't right. She was reached out to a year later and then became a cast member on the show beginning in season 3.

== Personal life ==
As of April 2026, Marilla is engaged to Tyler White, whom she met while appearing on Love on the Spectrum.

Marilla also makes bracelets and sells them under the brand Madizen, which she started with her older brother when she was 14.
