= Eric Lutes =

American actor (born 1962)

- Born: August 19, 1962 (age 63); Woonsocket, Rhode Island
- Occupation: Actor
- Years active: 1984–present
- Spouse: Christine Romeo (divorced)
- Children: 2, including Abbey Romeo

Eric Lutes (born August 19, 1962) is an American actor, known for his roles as Del Cassidy on Caroline in the City, Jerry Stanton in Switching Goals, and Jake Carlson on So Little Time (the latter two of which starred Mary-Kate and Ashley Olsen). His career started with several commercial spots. He then moved to New York City and appeared in many off-Broadway productions before finally making the move to Los Angeles, where he landed a role on Caroline in the City. He also played the KACL station manager Tom Duran in the second season of Frasier and has appeared in numerous TV movies.

Lutes was born in Woonsocket, Rhode Island, and raised in Charlestown, Rhode Island, the son of Claire, a psychiatric nurse and astrologer, and John Lutes, an artist.

== Personal life ==
Lutes has two children, including TV personality Abbey Romeo, who starred on Love on the Spectrum.

== Filmography ==
=== Film ===
Year	Title	Role	Notes
1987	Psychos in Love	Mechanic	
1992	Distant Justice	Charlie Givens	
1993	New York Cop	Powell	
1995	Body Count	Detective	
1998	Blood, Guts, Bullets and Octane	Dick Dupree Jr.	
1998	Bram Stoker's Legend of the Mummy	Robert Wyatt	
2000	Gedo	Winters	
2002	Jane White Is Sick & Twisted	Candy	
2002	Papal Cab	Richard	Short film
2003	Inhabited	Brad Russell	
2004	The List		Short film
2005	The 12 Dogs of Christmas	Coach Cullimore	
2010	Ironhorse	Future Krzysztof	
2010	Adventures of a Teenage Dragon Slayer	Shane	
2016	Jessica Darling's It List	Mr. Darling	
2016	Good Kids	Gabby's Husband	
2016	The Suitor	Salesman	Short film
2025	The Roaring Game	Harold Rose	
2026	Sleepwalker	Doctor Henson	

=== Television ===
Year	Title	Role	Notes
1984	I Lost On Jeopardy	Millard Snotkin	Music video (uncredited)
1989	All My Children	Valley Inn Manager	Episode: "#1.5182"
1994	Heaven Help Us	Jeff Barnett	Episode: "A Match Made in Heaven"
1994	All-American Girl	Grant	Episode: "Loveless in San Francisco"
1994	Ellen	Greg	Episode: "The Christmas Show"
1994–1995	Frasier	Tom Duran	2 episodes
1995	Mad About You	Mick	Episode: "How to Fall in Love"
1995	The Commish	Ernie Bradford	Episode: "Off Broadway"
1995	The Rockford Files: A Blessing in Disguise	Danny Barkley	Television film
1995–1999	Caroline in the City	Del Cassidy	97 episodes
1996	Full Circle	Drew Lands	Television film
1998	Legion of Fire: Killer Ants!	Dr. James Conrad	Television film
1999	The Wonderful World of Disney	Jerry Stanton	Episode: "Switching Goals"
2000	Martial Law	Hargrove	Episode: "Scorpio Rising"
2001	Twice in a Lifetime	Bobby Kremsky	Episode: "Daddy's Girl"
2001	Ally McBeal	Eric Bennett	Episode: "Falling Up"
2001–2002	So Little Time	Jake Carlson	26 episodes
2002	Strong Medicine	Trevor	Episode: "Shock"
2003	Without a Trace	Dr. Evan Mayhew	Episode: "Moving On"
2005	Inconceivable	Dr. Adam James	Episode: "Balls in Your Court"
2006	The Black Hole	Russ Martin	Television film (uncredited)
2006	The Suite Life of Zack and Cody	Harry O'Neal	Episode: "Have a Nice Trip"
2006	CSI: Miami	Todd Baransky	Episode: "Death Pool 100"
2006	Cold Case	Levon Krace	Episode: "The Red and the Blue"
2009	House	Derek Retzinger	Episode: "Known Unknowns"
2010	Desperate Housewives	Guy #1	Episode: "Lovely"
2010	Miami Medical	Greg	Episode: "Time of Death"
2010	90210	David	Episode: "Best Lei'd Plans"
2012	Shake It Up!	Snappy Sammy	Episode: "Whodunit Up?"
2015	How to Get Away with Murder	Dale	Episode: "I Want You to Die"
