= Do You Believe in Miracles? (disambiguation) =

"Do You Believe in Miracles?" is a quote from Al Michaels during the 1980 hockey match known as the Miracle on Ice.

Do You Believe in Miracles? may also refer to:

- "Do You Believe in Miracles" (song), a 1985 single by Slade
- Do You Believe in Miracles? (1996 film), a 1996 film by Hanoch Teller
- Do You Believe in Miracles? (2001 film), a 2001 HBO film
- "Do You Believe in Miracles?" (Midnight Caller), a 1989 television episode
- "Do You Believe in Miracles" (The Fifth Estate), a 2004 television special about Benny Hinn
- "Do You Believe in Miracles?" (The Oprah Winfrey Show), a 2010 television episode about João Teixeira de Faria
- "Do You Believe in Miracles?" (Supernatural), a 2014 television episode

== See also ==
- "Did You Believe in Miracles?" (Law & Order: Special Victims Unit)
