= Connor Tomlinson =

Connor Tomlinson may refer to:

- Connor Tomlinson (footballer)
- Connor Tomlinson (TV personality)
