= James Read =

American actor (born 1953)

- Born: James Christopher Read; July 31, 1953 (age 73); Buffalo, New York, United States
- Education: Pepperdine University
- Occupation: Actor
- Years active: 1982–present
- Known for: North and South; Charmed; Days of Our Lives
- Spouses: Lora Lee (m. 1978; div. 1983) Wendy Kilbourne (m. 1988)
- Children: 3

James Christopher Read (born July 31, 1953) is an American actor. He played the role of George Hazard in the North and South television miniseries, and had a recurring role as Victor Bennett on the supernatural series Charmed between 2001 and 2006.

== Early life ==
Read was born in Buffalo, New York. His family moved to Niskayuna, New York where he and his brother William Read III went to school. He started acting as a student of law at the University of Oregon where he graduated in 1976. He studied acting in New York City and then did several Off-Broadway and regional theaters such as The Denver Center Theatre Company, where he had a couple of leading roles and spent three seasons. In 1998, he earned his Master's degree in psychology from Pepperdine University.

== Career ==
Read is best known for his role as George Hazard in the three North and South miniseries (1985, 1986 and 1994) based on the John Jakes trilogy of novels of the same name (his co-star, Patrick Swayze, taught him how to ride a horse), and for his co-starring role in the movie Beaches (1988).

He had a recurring role on The WB series Charmed as Victor Bennett and was also a regular during the first season of Remington Steele. Recently, he could be seen as Ken Davis on the ABC family drama Wildfire and as ambassador Franklin Fairchild on the 2010 television series Persons Unknown. In 2008, he directed an episode of "Wildfire". In 2009, he performed in Better Angels as Abraham Lincoln at the Colony Theatre in Burbank, California. Since 2014, he has played the role of drug lord Clyde Weston on the soap opera Days of Our Lives. On May 30, 2018, Michael Fairman TV and Soap Opera Digest announced Read joined the ABC Daytime soap opera General Hospital on June 6, 2018, as Gregory Chase.

== Personal life ==
Read married Lora Lee in June 1978, and their marriage ended in divorce in 1983. He then married former actress/attorney Wendy Kilbourne in 1988, and the couple has two children: a son, Jackson (b. 1990), and a daughter Sydney (b. 1995). Another daughter, Willa, was stillborn in 1994. The family resides in Santa Barbara, California.

== Filmography ==
=== Film ===
| Year | Title | Role | Notes |
|---|---|---|---|
| 1983 | Blue Thunder | Policeman at Bridge | |
| 1984 | The Initiation | Peter | |
| 1988 | Eight Men Out | Claude "Lefty" Williams | |
| 1988 | Beaches | Michael Essex | |
| 1992 | Love Crimes | Stanton Gray | |
| 1997 | Walking Thunder | Abner Murdock | |
| 2001 | Legally Blonde | Elle's father | |
| 2001 | Not Another Teen Movie | Preston's father | |
| 2003 | Legally Blonde 2: Red, White & Blonde | Elle's father | |
| 2005 | A Lot Like Love | Brent Friehl | |
| 2009 | Fame | Alice's dad | |

=== Television ===
| Year | Title | Role | Notes |
|---|---|---|---|
| 1982 | Cheers | H.W. Sawyer | Episode: "Friends, Romans, and Accountants" |
| 1982–1983 | Remington Steele | Murphy Michaels | Main role (season 1) |
| 1983 | Trapper John, M.D. | Ace Bukowski | Episode: "The Agony of D'Feet" |
| 1983 | Fantasy Island | Eddie Random | Episode: "Random Choices/My Mother, the Swinger" |
| 1983 | Hotel | Pike | Episode: "Christmas" |
| 1984 | Jessie | The Streak | Episode: "The Lady Killer" |
| 1984 | Matt Houston | Fletcher/Jason Haywood | Episode: "The High Fashion Murders" |
| 1985 | Robert Kennedy and His Times | Ted Kennedy | Miniseries |
| 1985 | Lace II | Daryl Webster | Television movie |
| 1985 | Midas Valley | Josh Landau | Television movie |
| 1985 | North and South | George Hazard | Miniseries |
| 1986 | North and South: Book II | George Hazard | Miniseries |
| 1987 | Shell Game | Riley/John Reid | Main role |
| 1987 | Celebration Family | James Marston | Television movie |
| 1987 | Poor Little Rich Girl: The Barbara Hutton Story | Cary Grant | Television movie |
| 1990 | Columbo | Dr. Wesley Corman | Episode: "Uneasy Lies the Crown" |
| 1990 | Midnight Caller | Richard Clark | Episode: "Nighthawk's Got the Blues" |
| 1990 | Lola | Peter Baltic | Television movie |
| 1990 | Web of Deceit | Paul Evanston | Television movie |
| 1990 | Back to Hannibal: The Return of Tom Sawyer and Huckleberry Finn | Hugh | Television movie; credited as Read James |
| 1991 | Princesses | Michael Decrow | Episode: "Pilot" |
| 1992 | The President's Child | Senator James Guthrie | Television movie |
| 1994 | North and South: Book III | George Hazard | Miniseries |
| 1994 | Heaven Help Us | Max | Episode: "The Last Great Hope" |
| 1995 | Murder, She Wrote | Boyd Venton | Episode: "Death 'N Denial" |
| 1995 | The Other Woman | Michael Bryan | Television movie |
| 1995 | When the Dark Man Calls | Detective Michael Lieberman | Television movie |
| 1996 | Lois & Clark: The New Adventures of Superman | Jack Olsen | Episode: "The Dad Who Came in from the Cold" |
| 1996 | Harvest of Fire | Scott | Television movie |
| 1996 | Full Circle | Judge Carter | Television movie |
| 1996 | Home Improvement | Captain Jenkins | Episode: "At Sea" |
| 1997 | 7^{th} Heaven | Bill Sanders | Episode: "Brave New World" |
| 1997 | The Cape | Jeff | Episode: "Just Like Old Times" |
| 1997 | Diagnosis Murder | David McReynolds | Episode: "Open and Shut" |
| 1998 | Indiscreet | Zachariah Dodd | Television movie |
| 1999 | Profiler | James Lofton | Episode: "Las Brias" |
| 2000 | Touched by an Angel | Nick | Episode: "Millennium" |
| 2001 | Star Trek: Voyager | Jaffen | 2 episodes |
| 2001–2006 | Charmed | Victor Bennett | Recurring role, 13 episodes |
| 2002 | Becker | Dan | Episode: "The Ex-Files" |
| 2002 | Sabrina, the Teenage Witch | Ben | Episode: "The Competition" |
| 2002–2005 | American Dreams | George Mason | Recurring role, 10 episodes |
| 2005 | Crossing Jordan | Dean William Hargrave | Episode: "Family Affair" |
| 2005–2008 | Wildfire | Ken Davis | Main role; also: director, episode "The Comeback" |
| 2006 | Pepper Dennis | Mr. Brinkman | Episode: "Dennis, Bulgari, Big Losers at ACoRNS" |
| 2008 | Cold Case | Professor Robert Boreki '08 | Episode: "Glory Days" |
| 2010 | In Plain Sight | Damon Schmidt | Episode: "The Born Identity" |
| 2010 | Persons Unknown | Franklin Fairchild | Recurring role, 5 episodes |
| 2010 | All Signs of Death | Westin Nye | Television movie |
| 2011 | Castle | Anton McHugh | Episode: "Eye of the Beholder" |
| 2012 | CSI: NY | Robert Monroe | Episode: "Late Admissions" |
| 2014–2018, 2021–present | Days of Our Lives | Clyde Weston | Recurring role |
| 2017 | This Is Us | Duffy Collins | Episode: "Number One" |
| 2018 | NCIS | Alan Newhall | Episode: "Dark Secrets" |
| 2018 | General Hospital | Gregory Chase | Episode #1.14096 |
| 2022 | The Orville: New Horizons | Admiral Paul Christie | Episode: "Shadow Realms" |
| 2023-2025 | Bosch: Legacy | RHD Captain Rick Seals | Recurring role, 9 Episodes |

== Theater ==
| Year | Title | Role | Notes |
|---|---|---|---|
| 2009 | Better Angels | Abraham Lincoln | play at the Colony Theatre in Burbank, California |
| 2012 | King Lear | Albany | play at the Shakespeare & Co. in Lenox, Massachusetts |
| 2012 | The Tempest | Antonio | play at the Shakespeare & Co. in Lenox, Massachusetts |
