= Northern Pictures =

Australian television production studio

- Type: Subsidiary
- Industry: Television
- Genre: Television production
- Founded: 2010
- Founder: Sue Clothier
- Headquarters: Sydney, Australia
- Key people: Matt Vittins (managing director); Karina Holden (Head of Factual) (2026)
- Services: Television program production
- Parent: RACAT Group
- Website: northernpictures.com.au

Northern Pictures is an Australian television production company, which develops and produces mostly documentary television programs for multiple television channels in Australia and internationally. The company's documentary series include Once Upon a Time in Punchbowl (2014) as well as both the US and Australian versions of Love on the Spectrum, and Employable Me (2018). It also produces adult and children's comedy series, including Hardball (2019) and Austin (2024-present).

As of 2026, the company is part of the RACAT Group, along with Australian Geographic, Scout Publishing, game developer Runaway game developer, and Junkee Media.

== History ==
Northern Pictures was founded by Sue Clothier in 2010. Her aim was "to create high quality content that has the capacity to make a positive difference in people's lives".

In 2013, Clothier sold the company to David Haslingden, a media executive who also acquired New Zealand company NHNZ around the same time, through his RACAT Group. In the same year, the company formed a joint venture with Keshet International to operate Keshet Australia.

In 2017, Haslingden sold his production company holdings (including Northern Pictures) to Canadian company Blue Ant Media. Blue Ant Media also bought the RACAT Group of production companies and ZooMoo Networks. In February 2018, Peter Anderson was appointed as managing director of Northern Pictures, while Sue Clothier was appointed head of content and production, tasked with expanding output.

In 2018, Northern Pictures acquired the magazine Australian Geographic from Bauer Media Group. The whole editorial and production team remained in place, including editor-in-chief Chrissie Goldrick.

After Blue Ant Media acquired RACAT's operating businesses in 2017, Anderson served as a director of Blue Ant. RACAT reacquired Northern Pictures, Runaway Play (a video game developer), and Australian Geographic in 2020, and Anderson was appointed managing director of RACAT Group.

Anderson left the role of managing director of Northern Pictures in 2025.

== Governance and staff ==
As of November 2026, Northern Pictures is part of the RACAT Group, along with Australian Geographic, game developer Runaway, and Junkee Media.

At this time, the staff of Northern Pictures include:

- Matt Vittins (managing director)
- Karina Holden (Head of Factual)
- Polly Rowe (Head of Scripted Development)
- Kate Bailey (Head of Production)

Peter Haslingden remains CEO of the RACAT Group, while David Anderson has been executive consultant since leaving the MD role in 2025.

== Productions ==
=== Documentary ===
- Ages of Ice (ABC Television, 2026), a three-part series that follows scientists working in various locations in polar regions, narrated by David Tennant, written, directed, produced by Karina Holden
- Better Date than Never (ABC, 2023-2024)
- Changing Minds (ABC, 2014–2015)
- Employable Me (ABC, 2018)
- Ice Wars (ABC, 2016)
- Kakadu (ABC, 2013)
- Life on the Reef (ABC/PBS, 2015)
- Love on the Spectrum (US version, Netflix, 2022–present)
- Love on the Spectrum (Australian version, ABC/Netflix, 2019–2021)
- Luke Warm Sex (ABC, 2016)
- Once Upon a Time in Punchbowl (SBS, 2014)
- Once Upon a Time in Carlton (SBS)
- Once Upon a Time in Cabramatta (SBS, 2012)
- Outback (PBS/Nine, 2017)
- Saltwater Heroes (Discovery Channel, 2015)

=== Fictional ===
- Hardball (ABC, 2019-present on ABC Entertains (formerly ABC Me))
- Austin (ABC, 2024-present)
