= Abbey Romeo =

American reality show cast member

- Born: Abbey Romeo; May 17, 1998 (age 28); Los Angeles, California, U.S.
- Occupations: TV personality; social media influencer; musical artist; hatmaker
- Years active: 2020–present
- Notable work: Love on the Spectrum
- Partner: David Issacman (2021-2026)
- Parents: Christine Romeo; Eric Lutes

Abbey Romeo (born May 17, 1998) is an American autistic television personality, social media content creator and musical artist.

She is best known for appearing on all 4 seasons of Netflix's Love on the Spectrum.

== Early life and education ==
Abbey Romeo was born on May 17, 1998 in Los Angeles California. She is the daughter of Christine Romeo and Eric Lutes, who both worked as TV and film actors. She also has one younger brother.

Romeo was diagnosed with autism at 2 and a half years old after her parents noticed various signs of autism early on, such as sleep issues around 14 to 16 months old and tactile input-seeking behavior in which she would put lots of things in her mouth, beginning at around 19 months old. A pediatrician her father had consulted had dismissed these signs as typical development.

Soon after starting preschool at about 2 years and 4 months old, according to her mother, "they called and said she couldn’t stay because it was dangerous." Soon after, she was diagnosed with autism. Following Romeo's diagnosis, her mother enrolled her in Floortime therapy; after 15 months, she showed no progress and continued to be isolated and alone during that therapy. Romeo's mother switched her to applied behavior analysis (ABA), against the advice of her developmental pediatrician, who likened it to dog training. Interventions based on ABA for autistic individuals are developed from operant-conditioning and are marketed as an effective intervention for skill-building and diminishing behaviors that are challenging for the autistic person. It is considered controversial and widely rejected within the autistic rights movement. Following ABA intervention, Romeo's mother reported substantial improvements in Abbey's learning and communication. She emphasized that ABA was individualized, parent-involved, reinforcement-based, and did not include practices such as forcing eye contact. Romeo has said she enjoyed the food reinforcers ABA practitioners provided, such as Goldfish crackers and M&M's. Both Romeo and her mother suggest that intervention decisions should depend on the individual child rather than ideology and encourage families to evaluate therapies based on whether they benefit the individual.

Romeo later attended a mainstream school through second grade and then attended a school for children with autism until the 8th grade. In 8th grade her mother put her in a vocational program that focused on job and life skills. After high school, she continued to attend that vocational program, until she graduated from it in 2020.

Romeo has also spent over 22 years in speech therapy and 15 years in occupational therapy, and has stated that she continues to participate in therapeutic services.

== Career ==
Romeo was scouted for Love on the Spectrum in 2021 by the show's co-creator and producer Cian O'Clery. He had previously met her at Spectrum Laboratory in Los Angeles, where she was a member of a performing arts program.

Romeo began making music while participating in Spectrum Laboratory's film and music program. With help from the program, she wrote lyrics and released a music video for her first original song "The Girl Inside" in 2016.

In 2020 she produced and uploaded several music videos for original songs she had written to her YouTube Channel.

During the third season of Love on the Spectrum she debuted her original song "Boyfriend Forever". In May 2025 she made her television musical debut on The Kelly Clarkson Show in which she performed that same song.

== Personal life ==
Romeo began dating David Isaacman in 2021, whom she met while appearing on the Netflix show Love on the Spectrum. They broke up in April 2026.

Romeo has also enjoyed knitting; she developed an interest in the craft during vocational school and has been doing so as a hobby for many years. She later started selling knitted hats under the brand Made by Abbey.

== Discography ==
=== Singles ===
- "The Girl Inside" (2016)
- “Food Wrap” (2020)
- “Waterslide” (2022)
- “Hot Lava” (2022)
- “Categories” (2024)
- “Boyfriend Forever” (2025)
- “Right Here Right Now” (2026)
