= North and South (miniseries) =

Three American television miniseries

- Complete Collection DVD cover
- Genre: Historical fiction
- Created by: David L. Wolper
- Based on: North and South by John Jakes
- Story by: John Jakes
- Starring: James Read; Patrick Swayze; Lesley-Anne Down; Wendy Kilbourne; Kirstie Alley; Jean Simmons; Mitchell Ryan; Terri Garber; Genie Francis; Kyle Chandler; David Ogden Stiers; David Carradine; Jonathan Frakes; Hal Holbrook; Robert Guillaume; Nancy Marchand; Tom Noonan; Billy Dee Williams; Robert Wagner; Wayne Newton; Lloyd Bridges; Rip Torn; James Stewart; Johnny Cash; Gene Kelly; Robert Mitchum; Elizabeth Taylor; Peter O'Toole; Olivia de Havilland
- Theme music composer: Bill Conti
- Country of origin: United States
- Original language: English
- No. of episodes: Book I: 6; Book II: 6; Book III: 3

Production
- Producer: Paul Freeman
- Cinematography: Stevan Larner, ASC
- Running time: 90 minutes/episode 1,342 mins. total
- Production companies: Wolper Productions; Warner Bros. Television

Original release
- Network: ABC
- Release: November 3, 1985 – March 2, 1994

North and South is a trilogy of American television miniseries broadcast on the American Broadcasting Company network in 1985, 1986, and 1994. Set before, during, and immediately after the American Civil War, they are based on the 1980s trilogy of novels North and South by John Jakes. The 1985 first installment, North and South, remains the seventh-highest rated miniseries in TV history. North and South: Book II (1986) was met with similar success, while 1994's Heaven and Hell: North and South Book III was poorly received by both critics and audiences.

The saga tells the story of the enduring friendship between Orry Main of South Carolina (Patrick Swayze) and George Hazard of Pennsylvania (James Read), who become best friends while attending the United States Military Academy at West Point but later find themselves and their families on opposite sides of the war. The slave-owning Mains are rural planters from outside Charleston, South Carolina, while the Hazards, who reside in a small Pennsylvania mill town, profit from ownership of iron manufacturing and industry capital, their differences reflecting the divisions between North and South that eventually led to the Civil War.

== Plot ==
=== Book I: North and South ===
- Episode 1 (summer 1842 – summer 1844) – Young Southerner Orry Main, the second born son of a wealthy South Carolina plantation owner, decides to go to West Point. On his way to the train station, he rescues and falls in love with the beautiful French-Creole southern belle from New Orleans, Madeline Fabray. In New York City, Orry meets Northerner George Hazard, the second son of a wealthy Pennsylvania ironworks owner, who is also on his way to West Point. They quickly become close friends. At the Academy, they meet classmates George Pickett, George McClellan, Thomas "Stonewall" Jackson and a senior student named Ulysses Grant. They also meet the amoral egomaniac Elkanah Bent, a fellow cadet from Georgia. Bent is a handsome, smooth-talking man who hides his evil, twisted nature beneath his charm and good looks. He takes an instant dislike to Orry and George and uses his status as their drillmaster to constantly harass them. Orry constantly writes letters to Madeline, although it seems that she has not been responding to him. After two years of training, the men return home for a summer leave. George's sister, Virgilia, is a passionate abolitionist and immediately takes a dislike to Orry when she finds out that his family keeps slaves. While at home, Orry is devastated to learn that Madeline is marrying his cruel neighbor, plantation owner Justin LaMotte. Orry has an argument with his father over the hiring of the brutal and sadistic Salem Jones as the plantation's overseer. Orry stops Jones from using a bullwhip to "punish" one of the slaves, sparking a tense relationship between the two. After Orry witnesses Madeline's marriage, they privately speak to each other afterwards and find out that Madeline's father has been hiding Orry's letters to ensure that she would marry Justin. That night, Justin hits and rapes Madeline, leaving her traumatized.
- Episode 2 (autumn 1844 – spring 1848) – Bent continues his cruelty toward George, Orry, and their friends. The men, with some help from other cadets, arrange for Bent to be caught with a prostitute and he is forced to leave the Academy. When Bent learns that Orry and George were involved, he vows revenge. George and Orry graduate from West Point two years later. They leave to fight in the Mexican War. During the Battle of Churubusco, Bent, who has blackmailed his father (Bent is an illegitimate son of a US senator) in order to obtain a superior rank, orders George and Orry to lead a suicidal charge against the Mexican forces. Both men survive, but Orry is shot in his left leg and permanently crippled. Meanwhile, George meets Constance Flynn, the Irish Catholic daughter of an Army surgeon, and falls in love. They plan to marry. Orry drowns his sorrows in alcoholism. With the Mexican War over, George quits the army, finds Bent, and beats him, threatening to kill him if he ever tries to harm him or Orry again. Traumatized by his injuries, Orry temporarily becomes a recluse. When Madeline helps Priam, one of Orry's slaves, escape, one of the other slaves gets whipped for helping Priam.
- Episode 3 (spring 1848 – summer 1854) George marries Constance and Orry is his best man. Orry and Madeline become secret lovers. A terrible fire erupts at Hazard Iron and kills many of the workers due to George's older brother, Stanley, making a greedy decision. All authority over Hazard Iron is handed to George, greatly displeasing Stanley and his wife, Isabel. Orry's father dies five years later, leaving Orry to inherit the family plantation. His first act is to fire the brutal Salem Jones as overseer. Jones vows revenge. Orry's cousin Charles, who does not have good relations with the Main family, is challenged to a pistol duel in a dispute over an engaged woman. Orry, as Charles' second, begrudgingly helps Charles to survive the duel and they become close. The Mains visit the Hazards in Pennsylvania. Orry's sister Ashton purposely courts George's younger brother Billy, whom Brett has come to fancy. Billy and Charles plan to attend West Point together, just as Orry and George did. Orry and George begin a partnership cotton mill at Orry's plantation in South Carolina; they do so on George's condition that Orry not use slave labor in the mill. Virgilia is furious that her family has allowed slave owners into their house and tries to humiliate them, angering the rest of her family.
- Episode 4 (summer 1854 – autumn 1856) – The Hazards visit the Mains in South Carolina. Billy discovers how selfish and seductive Ashton can be and falls in love with Ashton's younger and kinder sister, Brett, much to Ashton's jealousy. George's sister Virgilia enters a passionate relationship with Grady, the proud and aggressive coachman of James Huntoon, an ambitious but easily manipulated South Carolina politician, who is also a strong suitor of Ashton, and helps Grady escape from slavery. Ashton, however, becomes aware of Virgilia's involvement and informs James, as well as announcing it in the Hazard family's presence. On his deathbed, Madeline's father tells her that her maternal great-grandmother was black. Billy and Charles graduate from West Point, and both families attend the graduation. Ashton sleeps with many of Billy's friends, still bitter over his rejection and attraction to Brett, which Charles is furious to discover, but keeps secret for the family's sake. Ashton gets pregnant and begs Madeline for help, who takes her to a local midwife to perform a secret abortion. When Madeline lies to Justin about where she was when she was away helping Ashton, he beats Madeline, locks her in a spare bedroom to starve, and kills Maum Sally for trying to help Madeline escape.
- Episode 5 (spring 1857 – November 1860) – Madeline is drugged by Justin into becoming robotic and submissive and disappears from society, even forgetting her love for Orry. Ashton marries James Huntoon, though she doesn't plan on being a committed wife. Elkanah Bent befriends James Huntoon, and subtly interrogates him at a brothel about the people in his wedding picture, including Orry, Ashton, and Madeline. Bent recognizes the resemblance between Madeline and the painting of a former popular prostitute that worked there. Orry visits George, but Virgilia's views cause a serious argument to ensue over the issue of slavery. Orry does not want Brett to marry Billy because of the growing tensions between the North and South. Virgilia and Grady both join abolitionist leader John Brown. In 1859, Brown makes his famous raid on Harper's Ferry, Virginia, to arm and free the slaves there. The U.S. Army stops the raid, Virgilia's husband Grady and Priam are killed, and Brown is captured. Virgilia escapes, but is more bitter than ever towards Southerners. Abraham Lincoln is elected president; several Southern states make plans to secede from the U.S. and establish themselves as a separate nation.
- Episode 6 (November 6, 1860 – April 1861) – Having argued with Orry, now a bitter drunk, Brett has fled to Ashton's house in Charleston and runs into Billy, who is stationed at Fort Sumter. Ashton, however, still holds a grudge against Billy and conspires with Justin's nephew and her lover, Forbes LaMotte, to harm them both. George visits Orry and the two apologize to each other after years of estrangement. Orry gives Brett his blessing to marry Billy. South Carolina secedes from the Union, infuriating Orry. Ashton schemes to have Billy killed, partly out of jealousy, and partly because Billy is now a "Yankee" enemy in the eyes of the South. She fails, however, due to a drugged Madeline, who overhears Justin and Forbes discussing it. Her memories come back and she runs to inform Orry after slashing Justin's left eye with a sword, blinding and scarring him in the process. After stopping Billy and Brett on their way to the train station, Forbes provokes Billy into a rigged pistol duel, which turns into a full-fledged fight after Charles arrives, resulting in Forbes' death. Orry is enraged at Ashton for her part in trying to destroy the new friendship between the two families with the Hazards as in-laws through Billy and disowns her, with her vowing revenge, seeing Orry as a traitor to the new Confederacy because of his friendship with the "Yankee" Hazards. Justin comes looking for Madeline, as she has taken refuge with Orry at Mont Royal, but is forced to leave with a warning. Now off the drugs and with her memories returned, Madeline plans to divorce Justin and marry Orry. Orry visits the Hazard mansion near Philadelphia to give George his part of their cotton mill money. When he arrives, Orry discovers that George and Constance now have a baby girl named Hope. Virgilia finds out that Orry is present and tries to have him killed by forming a lynch mob which threatens the Hazard estate; the mob's leaders demand that George hand Orry over to them, leaving little doubt that their intentions are to kill him. George and Orry face off against the mob with shotguns and manage to drive them off. In the aftermath, Virgilia, feeling her family will never truly understand who she really is, leaves the Hazard mansion, despite Constance's pleas for her to stay. Orry boards a train to return to South Carolina. The two friends part, unsure if they will ever see each other again. The Civil War begins.

=== Book II: Love and War ===
- Episode 1 (June 1861 – July 21, 1861) – Orry and Charles, now officers in the Confederate Army, leave the Main family plantation for the war in Virginia. Orry, despite having been against secession, becomes a general and military aide to Confederate President Jefferson Davis in the Confederate capital of Richmond. Meanwhile, George and Billy are in Washington, D.C., where they are officers in the U.S. Army. Billy joins the U.S. Sharpshooters regiment, while George becomes a military aide to U.S. President Abraham Lincoln. Charles, a Confederate cavalry officer, meets Augusta Barclay, a Virginia belle who smuggles medicine for the southern soldiers. Virgilia wants to work as a nurse at a Washington, D.C. military hospital and asks Congressman Sam Greene, a fellow abolitionist, for help. Orry's cruel and manipulative sister Ashton meets her match in Elkanah Bent, who sees the Civil War as a great way to get rich by smuggling forbidden luxury goods through the U.S. Navy blockade of the South. Bent and Ashton quickly become lovers, while Ashton's politician husband, James Huntoon, is unaware of his wife's adultery. With Orry and Charles gone to war, Justin kidnaps Madeline from the Main family plantation and burns the cotton barn; Orry's mother is injured trying to stop the fire. The First Battle of Bull Run takes place with George and Constance watching from a distance along with hundreds of curious onlookers from Washington. The rebels, having retreated to Henry House Hill, rally and stand firm. Charles and his friend Ambrose, unable to find their unit, join in a charge with the first rebel cavalry they find. The Union troops they are attacking include Billy's Sharpshooters. Billy recognizes Charles among the rebels and ducks under a log as Charles' horse jumps over him and Charles rides on without seeing him. The Union forces are routed by the rebels and flee the battlefield. George and Constance's carriage becomes trapped in the rush of panicked civilian onlookers and their driver abandons them. Constance takes the reins as George loads wounded soldiers onto the carriage and they begin the long retreat back to Washington. As chaos erupts all around, George gazes across the field at the approaching rebels.
- Episode 2 (July 1861 – summer 1862) – Hearing about her mother's injury, Brett and one of the Main household servants, Semiramis, make the dangerous trip from Washington, D.C. to the Main plantation in South Carolina. Along the way, Semiramis is captured by Union soldiers, but rescued by Brett. Orry leaves Richmond and returns to South Carolina as well; he finds Madeline at Justin's plantation and kills Justin in a fight. Orry and Madeline finally get married. Orry discovers Bent's illegal smuggling enterprise and stops it by capturing Bent's blockade runners, arresting his men, and destroying most of his merchandise. Bent and Ashton vow revenge. Meanwhile, in Pennsylvania, George's older brother Stanley assumes control of Hazard Iron. His greedy wife Isabel talks him into profiteering from the war by using cheap, low-grade iron to make cannons for the U.S. Army; the cannons often explode and kill Northern soldiers. They forge George's name on the documents, in case the cannons are traced back to Hazard Iron.
- Episode 3 (September 17, 1862 – spring 1864) – At the bloody battle of Antietam, Charles and Billy nearly kill each other, but each allows the other to escape. Charles's friend Ambrose is killed in the battle by one of the poor-quality cannons made by Hazard Iron after the Confederates capture it to turn on the Union forces, unaware of the sabotage. Afterwards, President Abraham Lincoln's Emancipation Proclamation frees the slaves in the rebel Southern states. Most of the slaves leave the Main plantation in South Carolina, but Ezra and Semiramis decide to remain until they decide how to move forward with their newfound freedom. Ashton visits her family's plantation, supposedly to see her recovering mother and sister Brett, but in reality to carry out Bent's revenge against Orry. Ashton tells Madeline that she knows that Madeline's mother was a high-priced, part-black prostitute in New Orleans, and that, unless Madeline leaves Orry with no explanation, she will reveal this secret and ruin Orry's public reputation. Madeline flees to Charleston where she is befriended by a suave gambler Rafe Baudeen and begins working for the city's poor and orphans who are suffering from the war. Following the Union victory at the Battle of Gettysburg, Billy, sick of not having seen his wife Brett for nearly two years, goes AWOL from the U.S. Army and makes his way to South Carolina, where he and Brett spend some time together. Ashton discovers Billy's presence and goes to tell the local authorities, but Billy is saved when Brett threatens her sister with a pitchfork long enough for Billy to escape.
- Episode 4 (May 1864 – late autumn 1864) – When Billy returns to his regiment, his commanding officer threatens to court-martial and execute him if he ever leaves again. Billy is also placed in harm's way by being put in charge of the regiment's skirmishers. George, now a general, is captured in a raid by Southern forces and taken to the dreaded Libby Prison in Richmond, where he is tortured by Captain Turner, the prison's psychotic commandant. Orry is shot and taken to the hospital where Virgilia works; despite her hatred of Southerners, she helps him recover and looks the other way, allowing him to escape. Later, Virgilia is accused of allowing a wounded Southern soldier to die and is fired from the hospital. In a fit of rage, Virgilia pushes the elderly chief nurse Mrs. Neal, causing her to lose her balance and tumble to the floor. Believing Mrs. Neal to be dead, Virgilia panics and flees the hospital. Desperate for money and a hiding place, she goes to Congressman Greene for help. He gives her money and protection in exchange for sex. Charles saves Augusta from being raped by Northern soldiers at her farm in Virginia, and the two become lovers.
- Episode 5 (December 1864 – February 1865) – The war has turned against the South. Orry and Charles save George from Libby Prison, kill Turner in a fight, and allow George to return to the North. Madeline helps starving people in Charleston. Returning home, George learns of his brother and sister-in-law's illegal business schemes to use cheap iron to build cannon, and forces Stanley and Isabel to admit guilt. While Isabel remains defiant and spiteful, Stanley expresses remorse to George and vows to atone for his crimes. Bent tries to kill Madeline in Charleston, but she is rescued by her gambler friend Rafe, who saves Madeline but is fatally shot by Bent. Bent enlists James Huntoon for help in his plot to overthrow the Confederate government. Although he is still oblivious to Bent's and Ashton's affair, Huntoon acts as a double agent gathering intelligence on the planned coup d'état and reporting the activities to Jefferson Davis. The Confederate President orders Orry to squash the planned revolution and capture Bent for treason. In a final fight, Orry and Huntoon attack Bent's hideout near Richmond. Bent is (apparently) killed when the ammunition he was hiding in a barn explodes after it is accidentally set ablaze by Huntoon and Ashton. In a moment of shock and clarity after witnessing the destruction of Bent's munitions and possibly him as well, Ashton confesses her affair to James, conspiring to have Billy killed, her past abortion, and tells Orry that she helped Bent drive Madeline away. Orry once more disowns Ashton in fury for her actions against both the Main and Hazard families, and tells Huntoon that he never wants to see his sister again, considering her dead to him now. Ashton begs Huntoon's forgiveness, but he tells her that it is too late, hinting that he, also in anger and disappointment for her betrayal of their marriage, plans to divorce her as punishment for her actions.
- Episode 6 (March 1865 – April 1865) – The fighting ends with a Northern victory. Orry and George lead troops against each other in the last major battle at Petersburg; Orry is wounded while trying to fight off Union troops as they overrun his position. Confederate General Robert E. Lee surrenders the Army of Northern Virginia to U.S. Army General Ulysses Grant and the Army of the Potomac, negotiating the terms of surrender at Appomattox. With the war over, Charles goes to Augusta's farm and finds that she has died giving birth to his child, a son. He goes to Charleston and gets his child from Augusta's uncle's wife. Billy also quits the army and reunites with Brett at her family's plantation. Congressman Greene ends his affair with Virgilia, which he thinks detrimental to his political career. Virgilia learns that Greene had been lying to her about the seriousness of the charges and using Virgilia's dependence for his own gratification; she murders the congressman and is sentenced to death by hanging. She and George have a tearful farewell before her execution. George learns that Orry is wounded and searches for him, finally finding him in a Union hospital. Their reunion is spoiled when both learn that President Lincoln has been shot. George helps Orry find Madeline, who reveals that Orry is now the father of their son. Orry, Madeline, their baby, and George all set out for the Main plantation. Salem Jones, the cruel former overseer of the Main plantation, joins with one of the Mains' former slaves, Cuffey, in an attack on the Main plantation; they burn the mansion before being killed or driven off by Charles, Billy, and Ezra. Orry, George, and Madeline arrive, with the former two helping to fend off the last of the attackers. Οrry's mother is killed in the attack by Cuffey while trying to prevent Semiramis' rape, but Cuffey is shot dead by Charles, while Salem Jones is shot dead by Brett when he is about to shoot Billy. Orry and George pledge to renew their family's friendship, and George agrees to help Orry rebuild his plantation home by reopening the cotton mill and letting Orry take the profits. The two families depart the burned out and collapsed remains of Mont Royal to prepare for the future.

=== Book III: Heaven and Hell ===
- Episode 1 (summer 1865–autumn 1865) – Elkanah Bent, having survived the explosion of his hidden ammunition depot near Richmond, becomes obsessed with getting his "final revenge" on Orry Main and George Hazard, whom he blames for his failures in life. Bent travels to Richmond and stabs Orry to death. Ashton visits Madeline with the threat of taking back everything of hers that Orry and Madeline took from her, including Mont Royal, but is horrified to learn that Bent killed Orry. When Bent tells her he has no use for her anymore, a furious Ashton tries unsuccessfully to kill him. Heartbroken at Orry's death, Madeline tries to rebuild the Main family mansion at Mont Royal and helps local freed people, to the disapproval of most of her white neighbors. After learning of Orry's death, George goes to Mont Royal and helps Madeline. Charles Main, now a corporal in the U.S. Cavalry in the Old West, meets and romances Willa Parker. Ashton begins working as a prostitute in Santa Fe to earn enough money to buy Mont Royal, unaware of its fate. Carrying out the next part of his plan of revenge, Bent goes to the Hazard mansion near Philadelphia and murders George's wife Constance.
- Episode 2 (autumn 1865–spring 1866) – Devastated by news of his wife's murder, George begins searching for Bent to exact justice. Cooper Main, Orry's older brother, becomes a member of the Ku Klux Klan and begins working to undermine his sister-in-law Madeline's efforts to help formerly enslaved people. Isabel Hazard, George's greedy sister-in-law, wants to buy Mont Royal and evict the Main family. Charles continues to work as a cavalryman in the Old West, and continues to romance Willa. Realizing that she cannot stand against Cooper and Isabel alone, Madeline asks George for help. Charles helps to form a unit of buffalo soldiers. Cavalrymen massacre a Cheyenne village.
- Episode 3 (spring 1866–spring/summer 1866) – George arrives at Mont Royal to help Madeline, and they fall in love. George, with his brother Stanley's help (who has now gone into politics), make Isabel end her plans, and Stanley divorces her, blaming her for all his mistakes. Carrying out the final part of his revenge, Bent kidnaps Charles and Augusta's son Gus. When George learns of this, he goes West and finds Charles. Together the two men rescue Gus, hunt down Bent, and hang him, avenging Orry and Constance. Ashton returns to Mont Royal and weeps when she sees that it has been destroyed. George and Charles return to Mont Royal to help Madeline and the freed slaves defeat the Ku Klux Klan. Cooper takes Madeline during the fight, and George rides after to save her. When Cooper is told by Gettys LaMotte to kill both Madeline and George, he refuses. Gettys kills Cooper, and George kills Gettys. Charles says his goodbyes before returning to Willa and Gus, while George and Madeline plan for their future together.

== Cast ==
The initial 1985 miniseries cast Patrick Swayze as Orry Main and James Read as George Hazard with Lesley-Anne Down as Orry's love interest Madeline and Wendy Kilbourne as George's future wife Constance. Kirstie Alley played George's outspoken abolitionist sister Virgilia, with Genie Francis as Orry's "good" sister Brett and Terri Garber as his selfish and wicked sister Ashton, as well as Philip Casnoff as Elkanah Bent, George and Orry's nemesis. All of these actors returned for the 1986 sequel, and the roles of George's brother Billy Hazard and sister-in-law Isabel Hazard were recast with Parker Stevenson and Mary Crosby.

North and South (1985) also featured many well-known actors as guest stars, including Elizabeth Taylor as bordello proprietor Madam Conti, David Carradine as the sadistic Justin LaMotte, Hal Holbrook as U.S. President Abraham Lincoln, Gene Kelly as Bent's father Senator Charles Edwards, Robert Mitchum as Colonel Patrick Flynn, M.D., Johnny Cash as abolitionist John Brown aka-Captain Smith, Jean Simmons as Orry's mother Clarissa Main, Mitchell Ryan as Orry's father Tillet Main, John Anderson as George's father William Hazard, Jonathan Frakes as George's older brother Stanley Hazard, Inga Swenson as George's mother Maude Hazard, Robert Guillaume as abolitionist Frederick Douglass, Morgan Fairchild as Burdetta Halloran, David Ogden Stiers as Representative Sam Greene, and Olivia Cole as Madeline's devoted but doomed servant Maum Sally. John Jakes' wife Rachel also made an appearance in Episode 6 as Lincoln's wife Mary. North and South: Book II (1986) saw the return of Carradine as LaMotte, Holbrook as Lincoln, and Stiers as Greene, as well as new guests Lloyd Bridges as Confederate President Jefferson Davis, Anthony Zerbe as Ulysses S. Grant, Nancy Marchand as Dorothea Dix, James Stewart as Miles Colbert, Wayne Newton as Captain Thomas Turner, and William Schallert as Robert E. Lee, with Linda Evans as Rose Sinclair and Olivia de Havilland as Mrs. Neal. 1994's Heaven and Hell featured Peter O'Toole as "louche actor" Sam Trump.

Filming of the miniseries resulted in four marriages among the cast and crew. Read and Kilbourne, who played opposite each other, married in 1988 and now have two children. Frakes and Francis, who had previously played opposite each other on the failed NBC soap Bare Essence, also married in 1988. Lesley-Anne Down married assistant cameraman Don E. FauntLeRoy in 1986. They met during filming of Book I when both were married to other people, and eventually obtained divorces. Garber married screenwriter Chris Hager, whom she met in 1985 when he worked as a grip on the set of North and South: Book II. They had a daughter, Molly, in 1986, and later divorced.

Color key
Main cast ("Starring" in opening credits)
Secondary cast ("Also starring" in opening credits)
Guest cast ("Special guest star" in opening credits or co-starring)

Role	Actor		
Role	Book I	Book II	Book III
Starring
Virgilia Hazard	Kirstie Alley	Kirstie Alley	
Garrison Grady	Georg Stanford Brown		
Justin LaMotte	David Carradine	David Carradine	
Major Elkanah Bent	Philip Casnoff	Philip Casnoff	Philip Casnoff
Madeline Fabray LaMotte Main	Lesley-Anne Down	Lesley-Anne Down	Lesley-Anne Down
Brett Main Hazard	Genie Francis	Genie Francis	Genie Francis
Ashton Main Huntoon Fenway	Terri Garber	Terri Garber	Terri Garber
Constance Flynn Hazard	Wendy Kilbourne	Wendy Kilbourne	Wendy Kilbourne
James Huntoon	Jim Metzler	Jim Metzler	
George Hazard	James Read	James Read	James Read
Charles Main	Lewis Smith	Lewis Smith	Kyle Chandler
Billy Hazard	John Stockwell	Parker Stevenson	
Orry Main	Patrick Swayze	Patrick Swayze	Stand-in
Isabel Truscott Hazard	Wendy Fulton	Mary Crosby	Deborah Rush
Stanley Hazard	Jonathan Frakes	Jonathan Frakes	Jonathan Frakes
Augusta Barclay		Kate McNeil	
Judith Stafford Main			Cathy Lee Crosby
Prudence Chaffee			Mariette Hartley
Willa Parker			Rya Kihlstedt
Will Fenway			Tom Noonan
Isaac			Stan Shaw
Jane			Sharon Washington
Adolphus			Rip Torn
Cooper Main			Robert Wagner
Francis Lewis Cardozo			Billy Dee Williams
Magic Magee			Steve Harris
Special guest stars
John Brown	Johnny Cash		
Maum Sally	Olivia Cole		
Burdetta Halloran	Morgan Fairchild	Morgan Fairchild	
Frederick Douglass	Robert Guillaume		
Abraham Lincoln	Hal Holbrook	Hal Holbrook	
Sen. Charles Edwards	Gene Kelly		
Col. Patrick Flynn	Robert Mitchum		
Clarissa Gault Main	Jean Simmons	Jean Simmons	
Congressman Sam Greene	David Ogden Stiers	David Ogden Stiers	
Maude Hazard	Inga Swenson	Inga Swenson	
Madam Conti	Elizabeth Taylor		
Jefferson Davis		Lloyd Bridges	
Mrs. Neal		Olivia de Havilland	
Rose Sinclair		Linda Evans	
Rafe Beaudeen		Lee Horsley	
Dorothea Dix		Nancy Marchand	
Capt. Thomas Turner		Wayne Newton	
Miles Colbert		James Stewart	
Gen. Ulysses S. Grant	Mark Moses	Anthony Zerbe	Rutherford Cravens
Sam Trump			Peter O' Toole
Also starring
William Hazard	John Anderson		
Nicholas Fabray	Lee Bergere		
Priam	David Harris		
Tillet Main	Mitchell Ryan		
Cuffey	Forest Whitaker	Forest Whitaker	
General's Wife		Bonnie Bartlett	
Lt. Rudy Bodford		Michael Dudikoff	
Cpl. Strock		Burton Gilliam	
Semiramis	Erica Gimpel	Erica Gimpel	
Gen. Philip Henry Sheridan		Clu Gulager	
Lt. Stephen Kent		Grant "Whip" Hubley	
Gen. Robert E. Lee		William Schallert	
Gettys LaMotte			Cliff DeYoung
Lt. Pickles			Gary Grubbs
Captain Venable			Keith Szarabajka
Jim			Chris Burke
Scar			Gregory Zaragoza

== Production ==
North and South (1985) was directed by Richard T. Heffron, from a script adaptation by Patricia Green, Douglas Heyes, Paul F. Edwards, and Kathleen A. Shelley. It was produced by David L. Wolper, Paul Freeman, Rob Harland, and Chuck McLain, with music by Bill Conti and Stevan Larner as cinematographer. Wolper also produced 1986's North and South: Book II with his son Mark Wolper, as well as Stephanie Austin and Robert Papazian. Conti returned as composer, with Kevin Connor directing, Jacques R. Marquette as cinematographer, and a script by Heyes and Richard Fielder. Heaven and Hell: North and South Book III (1994) was directed by Larry Peerce from a script by Suzanne Clauser. Hal Galli produced the miniseries, with music by David Bell and Don E. FauntLeRoy as cinematographer.

== Broadcast ==
North and South premiered on ABC on November 3, 1985. Book II premiered on May 4, 1986, and Book III premiered on February 27, 1994.

== Awards and nominations ==
The North and South miniseries were nominated and/or awarded with many different awards around the world, among which the most significant are:

Year	Award	Result	Category/People	References
1986	Golden Globe Awards	Nominated	David Carradine for Best Performance by an Actor in a Supporting Role in a Series, Mini-Series or Motion Picture Made for TV (N&S1)	
1986	Golden Globe Awards	Nominated	Lesley-Anne Down for Best Performance by an Actress in a Supporting Role in a Series, Mini-Series or Motion Picture Made for TV (N&S1)	
1986	38th Primetime Emmy Awards	Won	Costuming team for Outstanding Achievement in Costuming for a Miniseries or a Special (N&S1, ep. 4)	
1986	38th Primetime Emmy Awards	Nominated	Virginia Darcy for Outstanding Achievement in Hairstyling for a Miniseries or a Special (N&S1, ep. 1)	
1986	38th Primetime Emmy Awards	Nominated	Makeup team for Outstanding Achievement in Makeup for a Miniseries or a Special (N&S1, ep. 6)	
1986	38th Primetime Emmy Awards	Nominated	Bill Conti for Outstanding Achievement in Music Composition for a Miniseries or a Special (Dramatic Underscore) (N&S1, ep. 1)	
1986	38th Primetime Emmy Awards	Nominated	Stevan Larner for Outstanding Cinematography for a Miniseries or a Special (N&S1, ep. 6)	
1986	38th Primetime Emmy Awards	Nominated	Editing team for Outstanding Editing for a Miniseries or a Special – Single Camera Production (N&S1, ep. 4)	
1986	38th Primetime Emmy Awards	Nominated	Sound editing team for Outstanding Sound Editing for a Miniseries or a Special (N&S1, ep. 2)	
1986	38th Primetime Emmy Awards	Nominated	Hairstyling team for Outstanding Achievement in Hairstyling for a Miniseries or a Special (N&S2, ep. 1)	
1986	38th Primetime Emmy Awards	Nominated	Robert Fletcher for Outstanding Costume Design for a Miniseries or a Special (N&S2, ep. 1)	
1986	38th Primetime Emmy Awards	Nominated	Sound editing team for Outstanding Sound Editing for a Miniseries or a Special (N&S2, ep. 6)	
1995	ASC Award	Nominated	Don E. FauntLeRoy for Outstanding Achievement in Cinematography in Mini-Series (N&S3, ep. 3)	

== Media ==
=== Streaming ===
All three North and South miniseries are available on multiple streaming platforms, including iTunes, Prime Video and Google Play.

=== Soundtrack ===
The Varèse Sarabande Soundtrack Club released the entire score to North and South (1985) in a four-CD box set on February 25, 2008. The tracks in this set are the original recordings used in the production of the series, with three discs devoted to Conti's score and a fourth to the source music from the series. The entire score to North and South: Book II (1986) was released on October 3, 2008, and includes three CDs. On December 4, 2015, North and South: Highlights, a 76-minute disc featuring selections from the first miniseries score, was released.

== See also ==
- List of films featuring slavery
- The Blue and the Gray (miniseries) – 1982 American television miniseries
