= Christine Harris (actress) =

Australian actress and producer

- Born: 1958 (age 67–68); South Australia, Australia
- Occupations: Actress, producer

Christine Harris (born 1958) is an Australian actress and producer, born and raised in South Australia.

== Career ==
Harris portrayed a young version of popular Australian singer Julie Anthony in a television special, and moved to Sydney at the end of 1979 to star in the short-lived Network Ten series Arcade as paraplegic Tina Marshall, who worked in her father's pinball parlour.

She followed this with appearing in Nine Network soap opera The Young Doctors as Dolly Davis, before moving to Melbourne to play the key role in the Crawford Productions series Carson's Law as Amy Carson (1983–84).

Subsequent roles included stints in Prisoner from 1985 to 1986 as Pippa Reynolds, the daughter of the Prison Governor, in the ABC TV miniseries Darlings of the Gods as Georgia and Neighbours as Sylvie Latham. She also appeared in the motion picture Beyond My Reach.

Harris was the founder and director of HIT Productions. In 1997, she was named "Victorian Entrepreneur of the Year", for her efforts in establishing the theatre touring company, however it was liquidated in 2013 with debts totalling $1.8 million.

== Filmography ==
=== Film ===
Year	Title	Role	Type
1990	Beyond My Reach	Jade	Feature film

=== Television ===
Year	Title	Role	Type
1978	Days I'll Remember in South Australia	Voiceover	TV documentary
1978	Just a Job	Voiceover	Video documentary
1980	Arcade	Tina Marshall	35 episodes
1981–1982	The Young Doctors	Nurse Dolly Davis	
1983–1984	Carson's Law	Amy Carson	138 episodes
1985	Special Squad		1 episode
1985–1986	Prisoner	Pippa Reynolds	39 episodes
1987	Pals	Imelda Manis	
1987	Living Together	Presenter	Documentary
1988	Neighbours	Sylvia Latham	4 episodes
1989	Darlings of the Gods	Georgia	Miniseries, 2 episodes
1990	Flair	Mary	Miniseries, 2 episodes
1990	Skirts		1 episode
1991	Col'n Carpenter	Guest role	1 episode
1991	Chances	Caterina Donovan	1 episode
1993	Newlyweds		1 episode
1994	Review	Guest presenter	1 episode
