= Toy Soldiers (1984 film) =

- Directed by: David Andrew Fisher
- Written by: David Andrew Fisher
- Produced by: Walter Fox
- Starring: Jason Miller; Cleavon Little; Terri Garber; Tim Robbins
- Cinematography: Francisco Bojorquez
- Edited by: Geoffrey Rowland
- Music by: Leland Bond
- Distributed by: Metropolitan Filmexport; New World Pictures
- Release date: October 1984
- Running time: 85 minutes
- Countries: United States; Mexico
- Languages: English; Spanish

Toy Soldiers is a 1984 American-Mexican action film written and directed by David Andrew Fisher, and starring Jason Miller, Cleavon Little, Terri Garber, and Tim Robbins in his film debut.

== Premise ==
A group of Caltech students yachting off the coast of Central America are held hostage by terrorists. A retired U.S. Marine trains the hostages' friends to become an impromptu special ops force.

== Cast ==
- Jason Miller as Sarge
- Cleavon Little as Buck
- Tim Robbins as Boe
- Angélica Aragón as Presidenta López
- Rodolfo de Anda as Col. López
- Terri Garber as Amy
- Tracy Scoggins as Monique
- Douglas Warhit as Larry
- Willard E. Pugh as Ace (as Willard Pugh)
- Jim Greenleaf as Tom
- Mary Beth Evans as Buffy
- Jay W. Baker as Jeff
- Larry Poindexter as Trevor
- Roger Cudney as Mr. Green
