= Arthur Taxier =

British-American character actor

- Occupation: Actor
- Known for: Midnight Caller

Arthur Taxier is an American character actor, best known for the role of Lieutenant Carl Zymak in the TV series Midnight Caller. He also played the recurring role of Dr. Morton Chegley in the TV series St. Elsewhere, between 1983 and 1988. He played William Weiderman in the Tales from the Darkside episode Sorry, Right Number (1987), written by Stephen King.
