= Saltwater Heroes =

- Title card of Saltwater Heroes.
- Written by: Colette Beaudry
- Directed by: Adam Geiger
- Presented by: Andrew Ettingshausen
- Country of origin: Australia
- Original language: English
- No. of seasons: 1
- No. of episodes: 4

Production
- Executive producer: Sue Clothier
- Producer: Karina Holden
- Running time: 48 minutes
- Production company: Northern Pictures

Original release
- Network: Discovery Channel
- Release: 5 August – 26 August 2015

Saltwater Heroes is an Australian reality television series produced by Northern Pictures for the Discovery Channel. The series is hosted by Andrew "ET" Ettingshausen and portrays the real life events of crews aboard commercial fishing vessels and what life is like for commercial fisherman across Australia.

== Background ==
The program received funding from Screen Australia in late 2014 for a four-part series. The series is produced by Northern Pictures for Discovery Australia and Discovery International.

During filming, Ettingshausen suffered a problem with his diving regulator while underwater diving during filming in Queensland. Ettingshausen was unable to breathe air, and required assistance from other people diving near him, including sharing an oxygen regulator.

== Broadcast ==
The series premiered in Australia and New Zealand on Discovery Channel on 5 August 2015.

Internationally, the series premiered on the English language feed of Discovery Channel in Asia on 24 August 2015.

== Episodes ==
No.	Title	Original release date	Australian viewers (Note: Indicates premiere live broadcast rating according to overnight (live) rating from OzTam through Foxtel.)
1	"Northern Territory"	5 August 2015	32,000
ET faces saltwater crocodiles, fish with teeth and sweltering heat in the Top End.
2	"Tasmania"	12 August 2015	12,000
Deep down south, ET is in search of blue eye trevella and harvests Long-spined sea urchins from a kelp forest.
3	"Queensland"	19 August 2015	36,000
A sea slug diving operation goes horribly wrong near The Great Barrier Reef, and ET takes on the infamous Queensland mud crab.
4	"South Australia"	26 August 2015	27,000
In the seafood capital of Australia, ET is taken out of his comfort zone confronting the blue swimmer crab and goes oyster farming.
