= Wendy Kilbourne =

American actress

- Occupation(s): Attorney; actress
- Years active: 1982–1996
- Known for: North and South
- Spouse: James Read (m. 1988)
- Children: 3

Wendy Kilbourne Read is an American attorney and former television actress.

== Biography ==
Kilbourne may be best known as Constance Hazard on the North and South miniseries (1985, 1986 and 1994), and as Devon King in Midnight Caller. On the set of North and South, she met actor James Read, whom she married in 1988 and with whom she has three children: a son, Jackson (b. 1990), and two daughters—Willa, about whose 1994 stillbirth she opened up to columnist Robin Abcarian, and Sydney (b. 1995). The family resides in Santa Barbara, California.

She stopped working as an actress to attend law school, and is now a licensed attorney in California. She is the founder and CEO of The Children's Project of Santa Barbara, a residential charter school for foster children.

== Selected filmography ==
=== Movies/TV Series ===
Year	Title	Role	Notes
1988–1990	Midnight Caller	Devon King	TV series 1988-1991
1987	Nothing in Common	Jacqueline North	TV series 1987
1986	Condor	Lisa Hampton	Television movie
1986	North and South, Book 2	Constance Hazard	miniseries
1985	North and South, Book 1	Constance Hazard	miniseries
1984	Calendar Girl Murders	Heather English	Television movie

=== Series guest-appearances ===
Year	Title	Role	Notes
1996	The Cape	Caitlin Grayson	1 episode
1994	North and South, Book 3	Constance Hazard	1 episode
1993	Jack's Place	Samantha Tree	1 episode
1986	Murder, She Wrote	Susan Ainsley	1 episode
1986	Hotel	Mary	1 episode
1984	The A-Team	Nikki Monroe	1 episode
1984	Riptide	Stephanie Anne Davidson	1 episode
1984	Cover Up	Karin Barton	1 episode
1983–1984	Matt Houston	Joyce	2 episodes
1984	Knight Rider	Lauren Janes	1 episode
1983	The Paper Chase	unknown	1 episode
1982	Dynasty	Debbie	1 episode
1982	Three's Company	Blonde model	1 episode
