= Doug Warhit =

American actor

- Occupations: Author; Actor; Acting instructor director psychotherapist

Douglas M. Warhit is an author, director, actor, acting instructor, licensed psychotherapist, and life coach in Los Angeles, California. He has appeared in the films Beverly Hills Cop, Look Who's Talking, and Christine. He has guest starred on the television shows as NYPD Blue, ALF, and as the Ferengi Kazago in the Star Trek: The Next Generation episode "The Battle".

Warhit has written three books, Book the Job: 143 Things Actors Need to Know to Make It Happen, The Actor's Audition Checklist, and Warhit's Guidebook For The Actor. He has been named "One of the Top Ten Acting Coaches in Los Angeles" by Backstage magazine. and The Hollywood Reporter.

Warhit has an undergraduate degree from New York University and a master's degree from Antioch University.

== Filmography ==
Year	Title	Role	Notes
1981	The Chosen	Sam	
1983	Private School	Dorm Boy	
1983	Christine	Bemis	
1984	Body Double	Video Salesman	
1984	Toy Soldiers	Larry	
1984	Beverly Hills Cop	Bonded Warehouse Clerk #2	
1986	Playing for Keeps	Larry Diamond	
1986	Moonlighting	Doug	
1990	Look Who's Talking Too	Male Client	
