= Kaelynn Partlow =

American TV personality (born 1997)

- Born: Kaelynn Partlow; April 2, 1997 (age 29); Greenville, South Carolina, U.S.
- Occupations: TV personality; social media influencer; activist; applied behavior analysis paraprofessional
- Years active: 2022–present

Kaelynn Partlow (born April 2, 1997) is an American autistic television personality, self-advocate, applied behavior analysis (ABA) paraprofessional and social media content creator.

She appeared on season 1 of Netflix's Love on the Spectrum.

== Early life and education ==
Partlow was born on April 2, 1997 in Greenville, South Carolina. She has one sister and one brother.

She was diagnosed with the now-defunct autism subtype Asperger syndrome, ADHD, dyslexia and dyscalculia at 10 years old after undergoing extensive academic and psychological testing in Orlando, Florida. According to Partlow, her parents did not formally explain to her what Asperger syndrome was until she was 13. Due to her struggles with dyslexia, she did not read her first book independently until she was 14 years old.

Throughout her childhood, Partlow attended and tried a variety of different kinds of schooling. She started with attending a public school, then a private Christian school and was later homeschooled and unschooled by her mom. She has said that she felt that none of them seemed to fit. When she was 13 years old, she joined a private school program run by the nonprofit autism service provider Project Hope Foundation. She attended the school program as a high school student. Partlow later became a peer mentor at the foundation. While working as a peer mentor, she developed a passion for working with kids, especially autistic ones.

== Career ==
Partlow became a registered behavior technician (an ABA paraprofessional) specializing in working with autistic children, when she was 18 years old. In 2015, she began working as a registered behavior technician for Project Hope Foundation. She later became a lead therapist at the same nonprofit. According to Partlow, she is unable to become a board certified behavior analyst (an ABA certification requiring a master's degree) because her dyscalculia prevents her from passing the undergraduate-level math courses required to first earn a bachelor's degree. Partlow has said she can only perform math at a second- or third-grade level and that no accommodation would be useful.

ABA is a controversial operant-conditioning system commonly marketed as a treatment for autism and widely rejected within the autistic rights movement. Partlow has suggested autistic critics of ABA have their biases confirmed through disproportionate exposure to negative industry representations online (such as practitioners focusing heavily on compliance or dispensing robotic praise). She has also suggested autistic people may struggle to consider opposing perspectives, leading to heated conflicts between autistic supporters and critics of ABA in online spaces. Partlow has labeled the roots of ABA (including the historical view of autistic people as subhuman) "problematic" and acknowledged that many ABA firms continue to engage in unethical practices; she also believes many ABA practitioners have grown beyond such unethical practices and compared the evolution of the industry to the evolution of modern medicine.

In 2020, Partlow auditioned for Love on the Spectrum (a dating-themed reality show focusing on autistic people) after seeing an ad for it on Facebook. She appeared on the first season of the show, which first premiered on Netflix in 2022.

Following her appearance on the first season of Love on the Spectrum, her social media accounts significantly grew in popularity and were flooded with questions from fans of the show. Soon after, she began to regularly post videos about autism on TikTok, as well as on YouTube.

In 2024, her book Life on the Bridge: Linking My World to Yours as an Autistic Therapist was published. In March 2026, an updated version with new material and an introduction by the director of Love on the Spectrum was published.

=== 2025 public apology ===
In November 2025, Partlow released a video apologizing for deliberately mispronouncing then New York City Mayor-elect Zohran Mamdani's name in prior content, labeling it a "racist decision." She also apologized to the Jewish community for a prior video in which she revealed she had only recently learned that teenage diarist Anne Frank was killed by Nazis during the Holocaust. Partlow said she was sorry for not making it clear how bad it was to shelter children from hard truths and for using the sanitized term "passed away" to refer to the circumstances of Frank's death (rather than the more explicit term "murdered"). In the prior video, Partlow's mother had defended concealing Frank's death from her as a child, framing it as a protective measure and "what good mothers do."

== Personal life ==
In season 1 of Love on the Spectrum, Partlow went on a date with Peter Cole, a man she met at a speed dating event, but he ghosted her before their second date, and they did not continue their relationship. Prior to the show, she had two former relationships. In 2024, she stated that she had not had a romantic relationship in five years.

She has a big interest in dogs and dog training, and has a labrador service dog named Finnegan.
