= Connor Tomlinson (TV personality) =

American TV personality and autism advocate

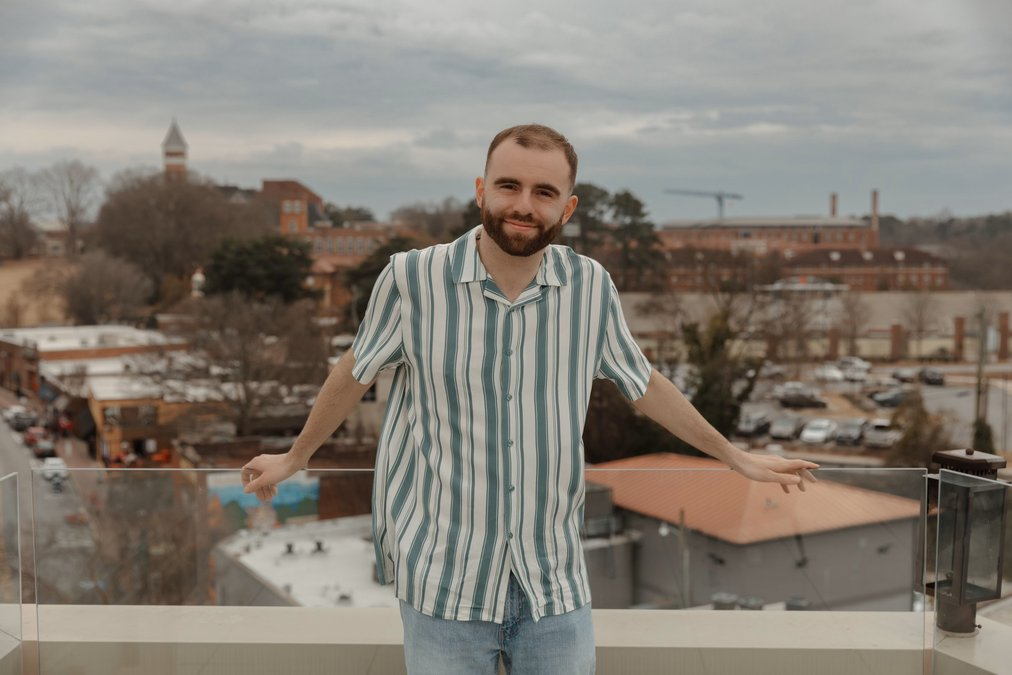
- Tomlinson at Clemson University in 2024
- Born: Connor Tomlinson; March 17, 1999 (age 27); Boston, Massachusetts, U.S.
- Occupations: TV personality; social media influencer
- Years active: 2024–present

Connor Tomlinson (born March 17, 1999) is an American television personality, podcaster and autism advocate. He appeared in seasons 2, 3 and 4 of Netflix's Love on the Spectrum.

== Early life and education ==
Connor Tomlinson was born on March 17, 1999, in Boston. His father, Sam Tomlinson, is of English descent and his mother, Lise Menard Smith, a podcaster, worked in the New England Center for Children prior to his birth. He is the oldest of four children. According to his mom, Tomlinson started to exhibit peculiar behavior traits before hitting his second birthday and she suspected that he was exhibiting symptoms of autism, including echolalia, walking on toes, and scripting but had difficulty in finding services from doctors, especially since Tomlinson was fully verbal and had no eye contact issues. The family then eventually moved to Cumming, Georgia, where Tomlinson was properly evaluated and diagnosed at five years old. Shortly thereafter, Tomlinson's parents divorced when he was eight, an event that he described made him feel "terrified and sad" initially but manage to cope well with it after watching Mrs. Doubtfire. Shortly after, his mother remarried.

Tomlinson described the rest of his later childhood to teen years as challenging, along with being bullied so brutally that he had to be withdrawn from school. Tomlinson then attended West Forsyth High School and graduated in 2018; he credits it as " the best four years of his life." Upon deciding not to pursue college, Tomlinson worked as a currency clerk at Kroger.

== Career ==
Producers responded to Tomlinson's family after viewing the joint YouTube channel Tomlinson shares with his mother. Though initially hesitant, Tomlinson decided to participate. In the trailer for Season 2 in January 2024, Tomlison's habit of slipping into a British accent and citing poetic one-liners was highlighted: "Love is a dagger, a pretty thing. A thing that enchants, but also hurts."

Tomlinson was the 2024 grand marshal for the Georgia Special Olympics and is active in neurodiversity advocacy.

Tomlinson has made numerous appearances in podcast interviews and made a guest appearance in April 2024 in the Broadway show A Beautiful Noise, where he joined the cast singing "Sweet Caroline" in the finale. He also launched his own merchandise line, featuring his quotes from the show. The collection, which includes T-shirts, hats, and mugs, sold out shortly after release, with proceeds benefiting autism awareness and related organizations.

Tomlinson returned for Season 3, which premiered in April 2025. He was paired with Georgie Harris and their relationship blossomed, each experiencing their first kiss on-camera. In the same season, Tomlinson garnered attention on social media. In particular, a clip of Tomlinson retorting, "I can hear just fine, SPEAK!" went viral across TikTok and other social media sites.

Tomlinson also made an appearance in his first acting role in an episode of the second season of Brilliant Minds.

In September 2025, Tomlinson got signed by United Talent Agency for "representation in all areas".

In January 2026, Tomlinson spoke at the Georgia State Capitol, urging lawmakers to support Senate Bill 433 (Rio's Law), which would create a specialty license plate aimed at improving safety and communication for people on the autism spectrum.

In April 2026, Tomlinson announced he would not be returning for the fifth season of Love on the Spectrum, as he wanted to focus on his acting career.

In September 2026, Tomlinson began co-hosting "What the Fact", a history podcast produced by Rewind Studios and powered by PAVE Studios, with Carter Roy.

== Personal life ==
Tomlinson was in a relationship with Georgie Harris, whom he met during filming of Season 3 of Love on the Spectrum U.S. The couple later ended their relationship during filming of Season 4 of Love on the Spectrum. In July 2026, Tomlinson publicly announced on social media that he was in a new relationship with a woman, Sarah Seibert.

In 2025, in a YouTube video, Tomlinson revealed that he has Graves' disease.

== Filmography ==
Year	Title	Role	Notes
2024–2026	Love on the Spectrum	Himself	Main role; Seasons 2 through 4
2025	Brilliant Minds	Tom	Episode: "The Witness"
