= Beyond My Reach =

- CD soundtrack cover
- Directed by: Dan Burstall
- Written by: Frank Howson; Philip Dalkin
- Produced by: Frank Howson
- Starring: Terri Garber; Alan Fletcher; David Roberts
- Cinematography: Peter Bilcock
- Edited by: Peter Carrodus
- Production company: Boulevard Films
- Release date: 1990
- Running time: 78 minutes
- Country: Australia
- Language: English

Beyond My Reach is a 1990 Australian film starring Terri Garber. It was shot in Melbourne and Los Angeles.

== Plot ==
Two Australian friends, a director and a writer, decide to seek their luck in Los Angeles.

== Cast ==
- Terri Garber as Terri Nielson
- David Roberts as Christopher Brookes
- Alan Fletcher as Alex Gower
- Nicholas Hammond as Steven Schaffer
- Nancy Black as Jennifer Sellers
- Belinda Davey as Emma
- Christine Harris as Jade
- Nicki Wendt as Pam
- Jon Craig as Curt D'Angelo
- Constance Landsberg as Sally
- Chuck McKinney as Phil

== Production ==
In 1983 Howson announced he had written a stage musical called Beyond My Reach which he hoped would be directed by Rodney Fisher. "It is about people who try to succeed so much that they end up with success and very little else," he said. "Although it uses the show business model, it's the sort of message that can be applied to anyone who's trying to succeed."

Howson had made three films directed by Pino Amenta but the two men had a falling out when Howson wanted to direct Hunting himself. Howson claimed he wanted Amento to direct Beyond My Reach "but his girlfriend, a make-up artist of little note caused some problems and that was it. And t-t-t-that’s showbiz, folks. Egos, egos, egos."

== Reception ==
The film was not theatrically released in Australia but screened widely on cable. Filmink said "it’s well acted (Howson once more showed his eye for talent by giving a lead role to Alan Fletcher) and has interesting themes… it just feels like it’s written too hurriedly. There are good moments, like a sequence demonstrating the impact of violence on screen."
