= Full Circle (TV film) =

- Genre: Romance, drama
- Based on: Full Circle by Danielle Steel
- Written by: Karol Ann Hoeffner
- Directed by: Bethany Rooney
- Starring: Teri Polo; Corbin Bernsen; Erika Slezak; Reed Diamond; Eric Lutes; James Read; Nick Wechsler
- Music by: Lee Holdridge
- Country of origin: United States
- Original language: English

Production
- Executive producers: Douglas S. Cramer; Dennis Hammer
- Production location: Los Angeles
- Cinematography: Tom Del Ruth
- Editor: Janet Bartels-Vandagriff
- Running time: 96 minutes
- Production companies: The Cramer Co. NBC

Original release
- Network: NBC
- Release: September 9, 1996

Full Circle is a 1996 television film starring Teri Polo, Corbin Bernsen, Erika Slezak, Reed Diamond, Eric Lutes and James Read, adapted by Karol Ann Hoeffner from the 1984 Danielle Steel novel Full Circle. The film also featured Nick Wechsler in an early role. It was directed by Bethany Rooney and produced by Douglas S. Cramer for NBC. It was the next to last NBC production of Steel's works; the last was The Ring.

== Cast ==
- Teri Polo as Tana Roberts
- Corbin Bernsen as Harrison Winslow III
- Erika Slezak as Jean Roberts
- Reed Diamond as Harry Winslow IV
- Eric Lutes as Drew Lands
- James Read as Judge Russell Carver
- Nick Wechsler as the mugger
- Allison Smith as Averill Winslow
- Nicolas Coster as Arthur Durning
- Mark Kiely as Yael McBee
- Starletta DuPois as Miriam Blake
- Robert Curtis-Brown
- Mary Kate McGeehan
- Sue Casey
- Jennifer Barker
- Rod Biermann as Billy Durning
- Alice Carter
- Peter Gantenbein
- Yolanda Gaskins
- Joyce Guy
- Christian Klemash
- Kotoko Kawamura
- Lyn Merritt
- Patrick Pankhurst
- Savanna Ryan
- Leon Simmons Jr.
- Fr. Clayton L. Thomason
- Kate Tucci
- Amanda Ware
- Brad Yates

== Production ==
Production in Los Angeles began around April 1996. The plot of the film was altered from the novel, omitting the social and political unrest of both the Civil Rights movement and the Vietnam War. Rather than being paralyzed from being wounded in Vietnam, Harry is paralyzed in a mugging.

== Reception ==
Tony Scott of Variety was impressed with the telefilm, particularly noting that while Tana isn't a character that either Rooney or Hoeffner spent time making the audience sympathize with, it actually made the point of the story clearer in how Tana makes her own way through life. Scott also pointed out how the film's intended demographic would be pleased with the offering, and praised Polo's acting, Holdridge's score, as well as the cinematography and editing.

Andy Webb of The Movie Scene, however, felt that Full Circle was not remarkable when compared to other Danielle Steel films. It has the typical content that her fans expect. He also stated that the plot development is "convoluted", but otherwise found the film to be average. He rated it 3 out of 5 stars.

Jim Schembi of The Age found the film "effortlessly satisfying" but noted that it felt less developed than previous Steel adaptations. Schembi noted that the ultimate love interest doesn't appear until very late in the film and that Tana's emotional upheaval regarding her rape is never actually handled. But he also commented that it made the film more like life to not have the issues resolved.

Kirk Nicewonger, writing for United Feature Syndicate, was very brief, stating only that the film is the usual fare expected from an NBC Steel adaptation. John Martin, writing for The New York Times, was likewise brief, saying that even Steel's fans might be disappointed. The Washington Post focused on summarizing the plot, only pointing out that Steel films traditionally did well in ratings as they played opposite sporting events. Knight-Ridder Newspapers' review praised Polo's performance and said that Cramer's work with Steel adaptations showed he knew the target audience well.

Michele Sponagle, writing for TV Times, had little to say beyond pointing out the soap opera feel of Steel's novels translating well to television and the star-studded cast of this film in particular. Jay Bobbin, reviewing for Tribune Media Services in 1998, said this particular Steel adaptation was more appealing than most. Mike Hughes, writing for Gannett, simply called it a "season warm-up".

Nielsen ratings ranked the movie at number 17 the week of September 9–15, 1996. When the film ran again on U.S. channels in 2000, TV Week, as printed by The Boston Globe, scored it 2 stars out of 4. When writing for TV Week in 1996, Bob Lapham only pointed out that the film contained Steel's customary dramatic flair.
