= Once Upon a Time in Punchbowl =

- Genre: Documentary
- Country of origin: Australia
- Original language: English
- No. of seasons: 1
- No. of episodes: 4

Original release
- Network: SBS
- Release: 19 June 2014

Once Upon A Time In Punchbowl is a four-part Australian documentary television series produced by SBS on the Lebanese community in multicultural Australia. It premiered on 19 June 2014.

Originally due for airing in 2013 the documentary was delayed due to issues with the integrity of the subjects within the program.
