= North and South (trilogy) =

1980s trilogy of novels by John Jakes

- North and South (1982); Love and War (1984); Heaven and Hell (1987)
- Author: John Jakes
- Country: United States
- Language: English
- Genre: Historical fiction
- Media type: Print

North and South is a 1980s trilogy of best-selling novels by John Jakes which take place before, during, and after the American Civil War. The saga tells the story of the enduring friendship between Orry Main of South Carolina and George Hazard of Pennsylvania, who become best friends while attending the United States Military Academy at West Point but later find themselves and their families on opposite sides of the war. The slave-owning Mains are rural gentleman planters while the big-city Hazards live by manufacturing and industry, their differences reflecting the real divisions between North and South which ultimately led to war.

The first novel, North and South, was published in 1982, and was followed by Love and War in 1984. The trilogy was completed with Heaven and Hell in 1987. All three novels debuted on The New York Times Best Seller list, with North and South reaching No. 1 within four weeks on February 28, 1982. All three novels were also ranked within the top ten hardcover fiction bestsellers for their respective years by Publishers Weekly. As of 2007, ten million copies of the trilogy remain in print.

The novels were each adapted into television miniseries starring Patrick Swayze and James Read in 1985, 1986, and 1994. The first installment, 1985's North and South, remains the seventh-highest rated miniseries in TV history.

== Novels ==
=== North and South (1982) ===
North and South
- First edition cover
- Author: John Jakes
- Publisher: Harcourt Brace Jovanovich
- Publication date: 1982
- Pages: 740
- ISBN: 0-15-166998-8
- OCLC: 7946770
- Dewey Decimal: 813/.54 19
- LC Class: PS3560.A37 N6
- Followed by: Love and War

Published in 1982, North and South introduces the rice-growing Mains of South Carolina and the ironworking Hazards of Pennsylvania, whose respective scions Orry and George meet and become friends at West Point. Over the next two decades (1842–1861) the men fight in the Mexican–American War, suffer various family conflicts and witness the increasing discord between the North and South regions of the United States.

==== Plot ====
Orry Main from South Carolina and George Hazard from Pennsylvania meet on their way to the United States Military Academy at West Point in 1842. They soon become close friends, frequently confronting their regional differences within the frame of their friendship. During their time at the academy, Orry and George are tormented by a sadistic Ohioan cadet named Elkanah Bent, but they are not able to effect Bent's final expulsion from the academy, as he returns.

The companions graduate and become officers in the United States Army during the Mexican–American War. On the way to Mexico, George courts a young Irish woman in Texas named Constance. George and Orry end up in the Battle of Churubusco in 1847, where Bent orders them to carry out a risky mission. Orry's arm is badly wounded and eventually amputated. He is sent home, but George stays. George is later released from the Army due to his father's death, and he and Constance return to Pennsylvania and marry. George and Orry eventually meet up again and resume their friendship, as tensions increase between the North and South. Soon, Orry's younger sister Brett falls in love with George's younger brother William "Billy". Later, Billy Hazard is a classmate of Orry's cousin Charles Main at West Point. They graduate and Billy is assigned to the United States Corps of Engineers, Charles to the cavalry.

In 1859, as Orry is planning a trip to Pennsylvania, Brett begs him to take her with him so they can continue to St. Louis, Missouri, where Billy is stationed with the Engineers. On the train back to South Carolina, the train is stopped by raiders under the command of the radical Abolitionist John Brown, in the town of Harpers Ferry, then part of the state of Virginia. Brett and Orry are sent on their way to South Carolina unharmed.

One year after the Mains and Hazards rendezvous in Pennsylvania, Billy is stationed only a few miles away from the Mains' plantation, in Major Robert Anderson's garrison at Fort Sumter in Charleston, South Carolina. Billy is given leave and marries Brett the next day. A few nights later, Confederate forces under the command of Brigadier General Pierre Gustave Toutant-Beauregard open fire on Fort Sumter, setting off the American Civil War. Orry and George say their final goodbye before the war, hoping for the best for each other.

==== Reception ====
North and South debuted at No. 12 on The New York Times Best Seller list, and reached No. 1 within four weeks on February 28, 1982. It was later ranked the No. 8 hardcover fiction bestseller of 1982 by Publishers Weekly.

=== Love and War (1984) ===
Love and War
- First edition cover
- Author: John Jakes
- Publisher: Harcourt Brace Jovanovich
- Publication date: 1984
- Pages: 1019
- ISBN: 0-15-154496-4
- OCLC: 10924093
- Dewey Decimal: 813/.54 19
- LC Class: PS3560.A37 L6 1984
- Preceded by: North and South
- Followed by: Heaven and Hell

The saga continues in 1984's Love and War, which follows the Mains and Hazards for the duration of the American Civil War (1861–1865). Charles becomes an officer in the Confederate cavalry. Orry (a military advisor to Jefferson Davis) finally marries his star-crossed love Madeline, but he is later killed at the Third Battle of Petersburg by a wounded soldier he tries to help. His older brother Cooper, who had a passion for shipbuilding, is sent to Britain to buy ships for the Confederacy. Both families have their share of suffering before the war is over.

==== Reception ====
Love and War debuted at No. 5 on The New York Times Best Seller list, and rose as high as No. 2. It was later ranked the No. 4 hardcover fiction bestseller of 1984 by Publishers Weekly, and No. 7 by The New York Times.

=== Heaven and Hell (1987) ===
Heaven and Hell
- First edition cover
- Author: John Jakes
- Publisher: Harcourt Brace Jovanovich
- Publication date: 1987
- Pages: 700
- ISBN: 0-15-131075-0
- OCLC: 16085535
- Dewey Decimal: 813/.54 19
- LC Class: PS3560.A37 H4 1987
- Preceded by: Love and War

The trilogy concludes with 1987's Heaven and Hell, as the Mains and Hazards face more challenges and obstacles while weathering the post-war Reconstruction era. Set chiefly between 1865 and 1869, the novel follows Orry's cousin Charles Main, a veteran of the Confederate Army who fights in the subsequent wars with the Native Americans and must recover from the trauma of his violent life. The presumed-dead Elkanah Bent murders George Hazard's wife, Constance, and targets the Mains and Hazards for complete destruction, while Orry Main's widow Madeline, previously revealed to be an octoroon, becomes a target of the newly established Ku Klux Klan.

One chapter of the book has the Main and Hazard families, finally at peace, gathering together at the 1876 Centennial Exposition. The final chapter flashes forward to 1883 when the sons of Charles Main (who by now had become a successful rancher in Texas) and Billy Hazard (who was now a successful land baron in California) enter West Point, just as their fathers and uncles did.

==== Reception ====
Heaven and Hell debuted at No. 8 on The New York Times Best Seller list, and rose as high as No. 2. It was later ranked the No. 9 hardcover fiction bestseller of 1987 by Publishers Weekly.

== TV adaptations ==
North and South was adapted into a six-part television miniseries for ABC, which premiered on November 3, 1985. Starring Patrick Swayze as Orry Main and James Read as George Hazard, it remains the seventh-highest rated miniseries in TV history. Its sequel, an adaptation of Love and War called North and South: Book II for television, debuted on May 4, 1986, with similar success. A final installment, Heaven and Hell: North and South Book III, premiered on February 27, 1994, but it failed to match the success of its predecessors.

The miniseries follow the general plot of the novels, although the focus is shifted from the friction between the North and South to the love story between Orry Main and Madeline Fabray LaMotte. Notable departures from the books are Swayze's Orry surviving through the end of Love and War (only to be murdered by Bent at the beginning of Heaven and Hell), Kirstie Alley's Virgilia Hazard not surviving, Elkanah Bent being a wiry Georgian instead of an obese Ohioan, and Orry Main's older brother Cooper Main being omitted from the first two series.
