= List of Midnight Caller episodes =

Midnight Caller is a drama television series that aired on NBC. It was created by Richard DiLello, and was one of the first television series to address the dramatic possibilities of the then-growing phenomenon of talk radio. The series ran 3 seasons from 1988 to 1991, airing a total of 61 episodes.

== Series overview ==
Season	Episodes	Originally released	
Season	Episodes	First released	Last released
1	17	November 25, 1988	May 9, 1989
2	21	September 19, 1989	May 15, 1990
3	23	September 28, 1990	May 10, 1991

== Episodes ==
=== Season 1 (1988–89) ===
No. overall	No. in season	Title	Directed by	Written by	Original release date	Prod. code	U.S. viewers (millions)
1	1	"Conversations with the Assassin"	Thomas Carter	Richard DiLello	October 25, 1988	201062	21.7
Series pilot. After accidentally shooting his partner, policeman Jack Killian retires from the force and takes up a job as a late night radio talk show host. But Jack is soon pulled back into his former crime-fighting lifestyle when a female serial killer who calls herself "Angel", and is infatuated with Jack, begins calling the station and telling him about all of her murders. Guest stars: Jenny Wright, Kay Lenz.
2	2	"12 Gauge"	Robert Butler	David Israel	December 6, 1988	177403	19.6
Jack tries to stall a spurned lover calling his radio show, from committing a murder-suicide with his girlfriend while the police try to track the man down and rescue the woman. Guest stars: Ed O'Neill, Yvette Nipar.
3	3	"After It Happened"	Mimi Leder	Stephen Zito	December 13, 1988	177404	18.7
Jack helps an old flame of his track down the man who impregnated her after a one-night stand...which also left her infected with HIV. Guest stars: Julia Montgomery, Richard Cox.
4	4	"Payback"	Kevin Hooks	Deborah Arakellan	December 20, 1988	177405	19.7
When a friend of Jack's is wounded and her partner is killed in an undercover operation, they find comfort in each other's arms. But, he is caught in the crosshairs of the mob looking to silence the only witness to the crime.
5	5	"Bank Job"	Michael Zinberg	Stephen Zito	January 3, 1989	177407	18.7
While trying to cash a cheque, Jack finds himself taken hostage in a bank robbery. Guest stars: Charles Cioffi, Matt Clark, Susan Walden.
6	6	"The Execution of John Saringo"	Reynaldo Villalobos	Richard DiLello	January 10, 1989	177406	22.1
Jack interviews death row inmate John Saringo (Joe Spano) just before he is executed. Spano won a Primetime Emmy Award for Outstanding Guest Actor in a Drama Series for his performance as Saringo.
7	7	"A Kiss for the Dying"	Peter Levin	David Israel	January 17, 1989	445158	22.5
After his son is suspected of the death of a girl he was seen with, a newspaper publisher eyeing Jack for a job uses his influence to get his son off without charges, begins a smear campaign against the deceased girl, and even provides a witness who Jack interviews on his radio show. However, when Jack starts looking into the girl’s death, he makes a startling discovery. Guest stars: Peter Michael Goetz, Darrell Fetty, Richard Bradford, Suzanne Weber.
8	8	"Trash Radio"	Larry Gross	Carol Mendelsohn	January 31, 1989	445159	19.9
When Jack trades barbs with Kingston Rivers, another late-night radio host, Rivers goes to great lengths to prove Jack was involved in the theft of drugs from an evidence room. Guest stars: Mitchell Laurance, Alexa Hamilton, Robert Romanus.
9	9	"No Exit"	John Patterson	Richard DiLello	February 7, 1989	445152	18.8
A young runaway, forced into prostitution, turns to Jack via his radio show for help. Guest stars: Bud Cort, Heather Fairfield, Brenda Strong.
10	10	"Fathers and Sins"	Robert Singer	Robert Singer	February 14, 1989	445160	20.7
Jack's father comes back after abandoning his mom when he was a kid. But, Jack remains wary of his intentions. Meanwhile, Devon and her father get into a heated argument over the life of her deceased brother, culminating in a fatal outcome.
11	11	"The Fall"	Peter Levin	David Israel & Robert Singer	February 21, 1989	445161	20.0
Jack goes back to a neighborhood he worked when he was a patrolman to help a woman's drug-addicted son kick his habit. But, given how long her son has been using drugs, it's uncertain if it'll work.
12	12	"Promise to a Dead Man"	Eric Laneuville	Thania St. John	March 7, 1989	445162	21.6
Jack is tasked with helping a retired cop solve a 40-year-old homicide, but it's a race against time as a journalist will do whatever it takes to crack the case.
13	13	"Blame It on Midnight"	Bradford May	Larry Gross & Richard DiLello	March 28, 1989	445164	19.0
Jack meets a night club singer and ends up falling hard for her. Her abusive ex-husband is not willing to let her go, eventually attacking Jack with a knife in a bar. Later, the man is killed, and Jack is the prime suspect.
14	14	"Ethan's Call"	Matt Clark	Randall Zisk	April 4, 1989	445166	18.7
The son of the officer Jack shot and killed asks Jack for help dealing with his home. But, the boy's mother is still furious about Jack's role in her husband's death.
15	15	"Baby Chase"	Larry Gross	Story by : Paul Robert Coyle; Teleplay by : Paul Robert Coyle & Stephen Zito	April 11, 1989	445163	19.2
Jack turns to his audience for help when a doctor's baby is kidnapped by a young woman, but it's a race against time since the baby has juvenile diabetes.
16	16	"Wait Until Midnight"	Eric Laneuville	Story by : Gary Michael White; Teleplay by : Gary Michael White, David Israel & Stephen Zito	May 2, 1989	445167	21.5
Proceeds from an armored truck robbery arrive at the address of a blind woman by mistake. Starring David Morse and Meg Foster
17	17	"Blues for Mr. Charlie"	Robert Singer	Thania St. John	May 9, 1989	445165	21.7

=== Season 2 (1989–90) ===
No. overall	No. in season	Title	Directed by	Original release date	Prod. code	U.S. viewers (millions)
18	1	"The Tarnished Shield"	Kevin Hooks	September 19, 1989	445903	18.7
A friend of Jack's commits suicide after calling into the show, and this sets off a chain of events that causes Jack to mistrust his previous training officer.
19	2	"Evil Is Live Spelled Backward (Part 1)"	Bradford May	September 26, 1989	TBA	17.5
A caller to the show appears to begin a killing spree to get Jack's attention, but Lt. Zymak is unconvinced the killings are all connected.
20	3	"Evil Is Live Spelled Backward (Part 2)"	Bradford May	September 26, 1989	TBA	17.5
As the killings continue, no-one is safe. Jack decides to confront the killer, especially after he takes Devon hostage.
21	4	"Mercy Me"	Michael Zinberg	October 24, 1989	445904	20.0
An old friend of Jack is conflicted about keeping his comatose son alive. While the boy is only alive because of the machine's he's hooked up to, he can't be euthanized under the law. When Jack's friend goes on the show, he creates a swath of controversy across San Francisco.
22	5	"Watching Me, Watching You"	Colin Bucksey	October 31, 1989	445905	21.6
A man who spots Devon on the freeway begins stalking her. As his obsession gets more intense, she and Jack get concerned. Soon, the obsession turns into a dangerous encounter.
23	6	"Take Back the Streets"	Colin Bucksey	November 7, 1989	445907	20.0
Jack and KJCM get caught in a confrontation between drug dealers and residents of the neighborhood. As it continues to escalate, tragedy ensues.
24	7	"Someone to Love"	Robert Singer	November 14, 1989	445906	16.6
When Jack's ex Tina Cassidy returns, now dying of AIDS, she asks Jack to help settle her affairs in her final days. But, she's uncertain if he's taking her diagnosis seriously.
25	8	"End of Innocence"	Colin Bucksey	November 21, 1989	445908	20.2
Jack helps a woman who's being jailed for refusing to reveal the location of her daughter, who she believes is being abused by her ex-husband. But, Jack could face a similar fate by a judge looking to railroad him.
26	9	"Blood Red"	James Quinn	December 5, 1989	445909	18.3
Deacon's girlfriend (guest star Pam Grier) has a gambling addiction that's gotten her in a tough spot with some shady characters. Meanwhile, Lt. Zymak investigates the murder of a wealthy communications magnate.
27	10	"Do You Believe in Miracles?"	Robert Singer	December 19, 1989	445910	20.0
Jack gets involved in a situation involving a missing Church statue, a turf war, and a girl with cancer, all before Christmas.
28	11	"Based on a True Story"	Michael Zinberg	January 16, 1990	445911	19.1
Jack, Devon, Billy, Deacon, Lt. Zymak and his wife Connie recount their experiences during the Loma Prieta Earthquake. They all found themselves in unusually helping situations, to get through the damage and destruction of the earthquake and its aftershocks.
29	12	"Planes"	Randall Zisk	January 30, 1990	445912	19.3
Jack tries to help a young boy left at a gas station by his mother and her boyfriend.
30	13	"Kid Salinas"	James Quinn	February 6, 1990	445913	17.0
Jack helps an illegal alien boxer being taken advantage of by his promoter. Guest star: Hoyt Axton.
31	14	"A Snitch In Time (Part 1)"	Eric Laneuville	February 20, 1990	445914	19.0
After a hit and run, Jack is accused of the death of a young lady, with a witness claiming he told her all about what happened.
32	15	"A Snitch In Time (Part 2)"	Eric Laneuville	February 27, 1990	445915	23.0
The case against Jack mounts up, but Jack starts to see the issues with the statements.
33	16	"The Reverend Sound Bite"	Peter Levin	March 6, 1990	445916	20.1
A young black man is seemingly attacked and blames the SFPD, namely Carl. Jack tries to prove his friend innocent, while also showing the Reverend has an agenda for getting involved. Carl also deals with issues relating to his marriage.
34	17	"Wrong Side of the Wall"	Matt Clark	March 27, 1990	445918	16.5
An ex convict is trying to go straight but his old partner wants him for one last job. Though he tries to get arrested for a crime he didn't commit, Jack finds out a better way for him to live outside of prison.
35	18	"Three for the Money"	Robert Singer	April 3, 1990	445917	18.1
Jack's father and brother, Frankie, get mixed up with a girl and a missing Buddha.
36	19	"Protection"	James A. Contner	April 17, 1990	445919	16.4
Jack has to help a couple being targeted by a drug cartel.
37	20	"The Hostage Game"	Charles Robert Carner	May 1, 1990	445921	17.5
When a childhood friend's brother is taken hostage on a plane, Jack tries to calm the man down, but fearing he has no option but to try and get his brother released, he takes drastic action, leading to a tragic showdown.
38	21	"Nighthawk's Got the Blues"	Robert Singer	May 15, 1990	445922	16.0
Jack is not himself, he is upsetting everyone, including his listeners and not even his friends can talk to him. Devon has to make a choice that will be difficult for her, she also tells Jack a personal secret.

=== Season 3 (1990–91) ===
No. overall	No. in season	Title	Directed by	Original release date	Prod. code	U.S. viewers (millions)
39	1	"The Class of 1980"	Eric Laneuville	September 28, 1990	446251	14.1
Jack takes part in a bachelor auction for charity and discovers the woman (Julianne Phillips) who buys a date from him is a murder suspect.
40	2	"The Language Barrier"	James A. Contner	October 5, 1990	446252	11.2
Problems between Italian and Chinese people living in North Beach come to a head, and Billie Po gets caught up in the troubles.
41	3	"Old Friends"	Robert Singer	October 12, 1990	446253	13.5
Jack investigates the nursing home where his father figure recently died.
42	4	"Ain't Too Proud to Beg"	James Quinn	October 19, 1990	446254	12.9
Devon has a surprise when Richard Clark returns and asks her to marry him. Jack is incensed that he has come back and just wants to take Devon away.
43	5	"Sale Away"	Rob Bowman	October 26, 1990	446255	12.0
Jack, Richard and Devon argue about almost everything, Devon gives birth to a baby boy and makes a decision that will change all their lives. Note: Last regular appearance of Wendy Kilbourne First appearance of Lisa Eilbacher
44	6	"Life Without Possibility (Part 1)"	Eric Laneuville	November 2, 1990	446256	11.2
After convicts from a local prison revolt and take some guards hostage, they call the station and ask Jack to air their grievances on the air.
45	7	"Life Without Possibility (Part 2)"	Eric Laneuville	November 9, 1990	446257	11.3
As tensions rise, Killian becomes the target of a man he put away.
46	8	"Ryder on the Storm"	Fred Gerber	November 16, 1990	446258	10.3
A DJ from Killian's past comes back to San Francisco looking for forgiveness for an accident that happened 20 years before.
47	9	"Home to Roost"	Robert Singer	December 5, 1990	446259	12.9
Killian's friend, a cop about to retire, is accused by an immigrant of atrocities during the Vietnam War.
48	10	"With Malice Towards One"	James Quinn	December 14, 1990	446274	10.6
Jack recounts a story from soon after he started at KJCM, which involves a released convict seeking revenge, not just on Jack but a former girlfriend of both men. Note: Features a Special Guest Star appearance by Wendy Kilbourne As Devon King
49	11	"That's Amore"	James A. Contner	January 4, 1991	446260	13.1
After a chef is kidnapped from a restaurant that Nick owns, Jack gets involved in the lives of the chef, his wife and the man she left him for.
50	12	"Her Dirty Little Secret"	Betty Thomas	January 25, 1991	446261	10.5
51	13	"Uninvited Guests"	James Quinn	February 1, 1991	446262	10.8
52	14	"Play Blotto... and Die"	Eric Laneuville	February 8, 1991	446263	10.6
A man who was taken into witness protection asks Jack to help him collect lottery winnings of $46 million, while avoiding the man that wants him dead.
53	15	"Can't Say N-N-No"	Randall Zisk	February 15, 1991	446264	11.6
54	16	"Blood Ties"	Win Phelps	March 1, 1991	446265	11.3
55	17	"The Added Starter"	Eric Laneuville	April 5, 1991	446266	10.7
56	18	"The Loneliest Number"	Peter Levin	April 12, 1991	446268	10.8
57	19	"A Cry in the Night"	Philip J. Sgriccia	April 19, 1991	446267	11.7
58	20	"The Leopard"	James Quinn	April 26, 1991	446269	9.8
59	21	"The City of Lost Souls (Part 1)"	Eric Laneuville	May 7, 1991	446270	15.2
60	22	"The City of Lost Souls (Part 2)"	James Quinn	May 10, 1991	446271	10.9
61	23	"The City of Lost Souls (Part 3)"	James Quinn	May 10, 1991	446272	10.9
