= Love on the Spectrum (Australian TV series) =

Australian reality television show

- Genre: Reality show
- Created by: Karina Holden, Cian O'Clery
- Directed by: Cian O'Clery
- Country of origin: Australia
- Original language: English
- No. of seasons: 2
- No. of episodes: 11

Production
- Executive producer: Karina Holden
- Running time: 58 minutes
- Production company: Northern Pictures

Original release
- Network: ABC TV
- Release: 19 November 2019 – 18 May 2021

Love on the Spectrum is an Australian reality television show that follows autistic cast members as they explore the dating world. The show is produced by Northern Pictures for ABC TV, and was made available to stream on ABC iview and Netflix (where it is known as Love on the Spectrum Australia).

The show was created by Karina Holden and Cian O'Clery, who got the idea for the series after working on Employable Me about people with different disabilities trying to find employment.

== Release ==
Love on the Spectrum first aired on the ABC in November 2019. In July 2020, it was released on Netflix to other territories. A second season was confirmed in September 2020 and premiered on 18 May 2021.

== Cast ==
Cast members
Cast member	Seasons	
Cast member	1	2
Jodi Rodgers	Relationship coach	Relationship coach
Michael	Main	Main
Kelvin	Main	
Chloe	Main	Main
Maddi	Main	
Olivia	Main	
Mark	Main	Main
Andrew	Main	
Ruth & Thomas	Main	
Jimmy & Sharnae	Main	Main
Ronan		Main
Kassandra		Main
Teo		Main
Jayden		Main

== Reception ==
The show has received positive reviews from most critics. It was awarded 4 out 5 stars by Rebecca Nicholson of The Guardian, saying that "at its best, this show is a compassionate, human celebration of difference, and of love." Brett White of Decider recommended for viewers to stream the show, observing that "Love on the Spectrum is unlike any Netflix reality dating show you've seen before, in the best way." Alison Foreman of Mashable gave the show a positive review, saying that "Love on the Spectrum is an affecting show that paints telling portraits of human connection that are so lovely, so moving, and so wholly satisfying, it's hard to imagine reality dating being done any other way", while Brian Lowry of CNN Entertainment said that the show "exhibits empathy toward the featured players without condescending toward them, and quickly bridges any cultural barriers in a broadly universal manner." In his review of the series, Daniel Hart of Ready Steady Cut was also positive, concluding that "a reality series that helps to dispel some of the stigma surrounding autism is particularly welcome." Although Michael Phillips of the Chicago Tribune was somewhat more critical of certain parts of the series, he nevertheless observed, "Unlike Tiger King or The Bachelor, or certain real-life political reality shows that lost touch with the real world a long time ago, Love on the Spectrum is about empathy. And about something more interesting than contempt."

Autistic reviewers generally liked the show, but questioned certain aspects, such as editing choices, an unbalanced focus on parental reactions and the neurotypical coaching that prioritised neurotypical perspectives and infantilised the neurodivergent cast members. Sara Luterman from Spectrum said, "The show is also riddled with bad advice and is frequently infantilizing. There are more interviews with parents than with the people the show is ostensibly about... The therapy and assistance offered to the young people featured on the show is similarly out of touch." Sarah Kurchak from Time asked, "Is the score a bit too cutesy for a show about adults and dating? Would the close-ups on potentially eccentric clothing choices have happened if their subjects were neurotypical? Were the introductions that listed their subjects' 'quirky' likes and dislikes genuinely informative or infantilizing?" Joseph Stanichar from Paste said, "Love on the Spectrum isn't perfect, especially in its first season ... some of the questions posed seem inappropriate or infantilizing, even down to the tone of voice, and the music is occasionally too cutesy for adults going on dates."

== Spin-off series ==
An American version of the show, titled Love on the Spectrum U.S., premiered on 18 May 2022 on Netflix. It is also produced by Northern Pictures, with Karina Holden and Cian O'Clery as executive producers. The series was renewed for a second season in September 2022, which premiered on 19 January 2024. The third season was announced on 2 April 2024 and premiered on 2 April 2025.

In 2023, O'Clery released a separate series, Better Date Than Never, which similarly focused on people looking to date for the first time with a range of backgrounds - including non-heteronormative sexuality and gender backgrounds. It premiered on the ABC in 2023, and received a second series in 2024.

A participant in the original series, Michael Theo, landed a lead role in the six-part British-Australian comedy drama series Austin, which premiered in Australia in June 2024.

== See also ==
- Autism in Love
- Employable Me (Australian TV series)
- The Undateables
