= Employable Me (Canadian TV series) =

Canadian television documentary series

Employable Me is a Canadian television documentary series, which features job-seekers determined to show that having a physical disability or neurological condition shouldn't make them unemployable.

Based on a British series which aired on BBC Two, the Canadian series is produced by Thomas Howe and Associates. It premiered August 11, 2017 on AMI-tv, and November 2, 2017 on TVOntario.

The series was renewed for a second season which aired in 2018, and for a third season which aired in 2019.

Employable Me won MIPCOM's Diversify TV's Excellence Award for representation of disability: non-scripted, in Cannes on October 17, 2017, and the Rockie Award at the 2018 Banff World Media Festival. The show has received three Canadian Screen Award nominations for Best Factual Series, at the 6th Canadian Screen Awards in 2018 the 7th Canadian Screen Awards in 2019 and the 8th Canadian Screen Awards in 2020.

== See also ==
- Employable Me (Australian TV series)
