= Midnight Caller =

Television show

- Genre: Drama
- Created by: Richard DiLello
- Starring: Gary Cole; Wendy Kilbourne; Lisa Eilbacher; Dennis Dun; Mykel T. Williamson; Arthur Taxier
- Composers: Ross Levinson; Brad Fiedel
- Country of origin: United States
- Original language: English
- No. of seasons: 3
- No. of episodes: 61 (list of episodes)

Production
- Executive producers: Robert Singer; Robert Butler (season 1)
- Production location: San Francisco
- Camera setup: Panavision Cameras and Lenses
- Running time: 60 minutes
- Production companies: December 3rd Productions; Gangbuster Films Inc. (season 1); Lorimar Television

Original release
- Network: NBC
- Release: October 25, 1988 – May 10, 1991

Midnight Caller is an American drama television series created by Richard DiLello, which aired on NBC from October 25, 1988, to May 10, 1991. It was one of the first television series to address the dramatic possibilities of the then-growing phenomenon of talk radio.

== Premise ==
Jack Killian is a former San Francisco police detective who quits the force after he accidentally shot his partner dead in a confrontation with armed criminals. After lapsing into alcoholism, Killian receives an offer from Devon King, the beautiful and wealthy owner-operator of KJCM-FM, to become "The Nighthawk", host of an overnight talk show, taking calls from listeners and acting as a detective solving their problems during the day (the title of Killian's show would later be adopted in real life by talk-show host George Noory on KTRS in St. Louis from 1996 until 2003, when Noory took over from the retiring Art Bell as host of the nationally syndicated Coast to Coast AM). Even though Killian snapped that he doesn't listen to FM radio, he accepted the offer.

Killian's adventures took him frequently back into the realm of police work, where several of his former colleagues were less than happy to see him again. He faced myriad problems, both personal and professional, and was at various points required to come to grips with the nature of his relationships with his absentee father, his troubled siblings, and Devon. Devon eventually became pregnant in a relationship with another man and sold the station (Kilbourne was simultaneously pregnant in real life). Episodes dealt with AIDS, capital punishment, and child abuse among other topics. The show lost viewers when it was moved from its original time slot and was cancelled after three seasons.

Most episodes ended with Killian monologuing to listeners, recapping the episode and lessons learned. Killian's radio show sign-off comment was: "This is Jack Killian, the Nighthawk, on KJCM, 98.3, and good night America... wherever you are"

The show's jazz music soundtrack added to its popularity. Rick Braun wrote the theme tune for the series.

In October 1990, Wendy Kilbourne (Devon King) left the show due to her pregnancy. Lisa Eilbacher (Nicky Molloy) became the new female lead role.

== Episodes ==
Season	Episodes	Originally released	
Season	Episodes	First released	Last released
1	17	November 25, 1988	May 9, 1989
2	21	September 19, 1989	May 15, 1990
3	23	September 28, 1990	May 10, 1991

== Cast and characters ==
- Gary Cole as Jack Killian
- Wendy Kilbourne as Devon King
- Dennis Dun as Billy Po
- Mykelti Williamson as Deacon Bridges
- Arthur Taxier as Lt. Carl Zymak
- Lisa Eilbacher as Nicky Molloy

== Production ==
=== Title ===
Series creator Richard DiLello took the title of the series from a song written by Pete Ham for the band Badfinger. DiLello had previously authored The Longest Cocktail Party, a history of the rise and fall of The Beatles' corporation, Apple Corps, and their record label, Apple Records, where Badfinger had originally been signed. The song itself had no relation to the series' subject matter; it had been written by Ham in tribute to a friend of the band who had resorted to working as a high-priced prostitute to pay her bills.

=== Production ===
The series was filmed on location in San Francisco. Interior shots were done at a studio complex in the city, while exterior shots happened on location.

=== Theme song ===
The series theme, as performed by Rick Braun, has become a popular mainstay on Smooth Jazz radio stations.

=== "After It Happened" controversy ===
In the 1988 episode "After It Happened", a bisexual man is depicted as an AIDS carrier who deliberately infects heterosexual women. As originally conceived, the man is gunned down in a vigilantism murder by one of the women whom he infects, and a medical team in full Hazmat suit comes to take his body away as Jack Killian comforts the distraught shooter. In the broadcast version, the victim is stopped before she can kill the carrier. Coming in the early years of the epidemiology of HIV/AIDS in the US at a time when public understanding of the disease was quite low, the proposed episode was immediately criticised as sensationalistic, ignorant of bisexuality, and pseudoscience. Protests were launched by GLAAD, BiNet USA and bialogue, among others. Additionally ACT UP pickets disrupted the show's filming. Then-NBC affiliate KRON-TV in San Francisco ran a disclaimer before the show with an AIDS hotline number and aired a half-hour live special, Midnight Caller: The Response, during which activists and public health officials aired their grievances.

== Awards and nominations ==
In 1989, both Kay Lenz and Joe Spano won an Emmy Award for Outstanding Guest Actress in a Drama Series and Outstanding Guest Actor in a Drama Series, for their performances in the episodes "After It Happened" and "The Execution of John Saringo", respectively.

Year	Award	Category	Nominated work	Result
1989	Primetime Emmy Awards	Outstanding Guest Actor in a Drama Series	Peter Boyle	Nominated
1989	Primetime Emmy Awards	Outstanding Guest Actor in a Drama Series	Joe Spano	Won
1989	Primetime Emmy Awards	Outstanding Guest Actress in a Drama Series	Kay Lenz	Won
1989	Primetime Emmy Awards	Outstanding Directing for a Drama Series	Thomas Carter, "Pilot"	Nominated
1990	Primetime Emmy Awards	Outstanding Guest Actor in a Drama Series	Bruce Weitz	Nominated
1990	Primetime Emmy Awards	Outstanding Guest Actress in a Drama Series	Kay Lenz	Nominated
1990	Primetime Emmy Awards	Outstanding Cinematography for a Series	Bradley B. Six	Nominated
1990	Primetime Emmy Awards	Outstanding Editing - Single Camera	Roger Bondelli	Nominated

== International distribution ==
In the Philippines, the show was broadcast on PTV-4 from 1990 to 1991, and then ABC-5 from 1992 to 1996, with dubbing in Tagalog from 1994. In the UK, it was broadcast by BBC1 from 1989, before later being re-run on ITV in the late '90s, and being re-acquired for broadcast by Forces TV in 2021. In New Zealand, the series was one of the early shows on the then-newly launched TV3, and it was screened in the early 1990s.

It is not currently available on any streaming channel.
