= Employable Me (Australian TV series) =

Australian television documentary series

Employable Me is an Australian television documentary series that features job-seekers who show that having a physical disability or neurological condition does not make them unemployable. Based on the British series that aired on BBC Two, the series is produced by Northern Pictures for the ABC. It first screened in April 2018 and a second season screened in 2019.

== Awards ==
Employable Me won an award in the Reality TV category at the Venice TV Awards in 2018 and won two gold medals at the New York Festivals International TV & Film Awards. The first season won the 2019 United Nations Department of Public Information Gold Award to honour exceptional programs that best exemplify the aims and ideals of the United Nations, and the second season won the Gold World Medal for Documentary for its exploration of social issues affecting neurodivergent people.

== See also ==
- Disability in Australia
- Employable Me (Canadian TV series)
- Employment of autistic people
- Neurodiversity and labor rights
- Supported employment
