= Love on the Spectrum (American TV series) =

American reality television show

- Genre: Reality show
- Created by: Karina Holden; Cian O'Clery
- Based on: Love on the Spectrum by Karina Holden; Cian O'Clery
- Directed by: Cian O'Clery
- Composers: Mitch Stewart; Adam Gock; Brontë Horder; Dinesh Wicks; Robert Allen Elliott
- Country of origin: United States
- Original language: English
- No. of seasons: 4
- No. of episodes: 27

Production
- Executive producers: Karina Holden; Cian O'Clery
- Cinematography: Stefan Weinberger; Daniel Hollis; Dave May; Cian O'Clery
- Editors: Simon Callow-Wright; Rachel Grierson-Johns; Leanne Cole; John Rosser
- Running time: 39—53 minutes
- Production company: Northern Pictures

Original release
- Network: Netflix
- Release: May 18, 2022 – present

Related
- Love on the Spectrum (Australian TV series)

Love on the Spectrum is an American reality television show. Based on the Australian show of the same name, it follows autistic cast members as they explore the dating world. The show is produced by Northern Pictures for Netflix. Karina Holden and Cian O'Clery are credited as the show's creators and producers, with O’Clery also directing.

Originally, the show was referred to as Love on the Spectrum U.S.

== Release ==
Love on the Spectrum first aired on Netflix on May 18, 2022. A second season, which was announced in September 2022, premiered on January 19, 2024. The third season, announced on April 2, 2024, premiered exactly a year later on April 2, 2025. On May 14, 2025, Netflix announced that the show had been renewed for a fourth season, which premiered on April 1, 2026.

Two days after the season 4 release, it was announced that Netflix picked it up for a fifth season; it was later announced that Connor Tomlinson would not be returning for another subsequent season, citing his desire to focus on his burgeoning acting career.

== Cast ==
Cast members
Cast member	Seasons			
Cast member	1	2	3	4
Dani Bowman	Main	Main	Main	Guest
James Jones	Main	Main	Main	Main
Abbey Romeo	Main	Main	Main	Guest
Kaelynn Partlow	Main			
Steve Spitz	Main	Main		
Subodh Garg	Main			
David Isaacman	Recurring	Main	Main	Guest
Connor Tomlinson		Main	Main	Main
Tanner Smith		Main	Main	Guest
Journey Early		Main		
Adan Correa	Recurring	Recurring	Main	
Madison Marilla			Main	Main
Pari Kim			Main	Guest
Tina Zhu Xi Caruso			Recurring	Guest
Georgie Harris			Recurring	Main
Tyler White			Recurring	Main
Shelley Wolfe			Recurring	Main
Dylan Aguilar				Main
Emma Sue Miller				Main
Logan Pereira				Main
Jennifer Cook	Recurring	Recurring	Recurring	Recurring
Fletcher Darr		Recurring	Recurring	Recurring
Elijah Pancoast		Recurring	Recurring	Recurring
Joshua Bolling		Recurring		

== Episodes ==
Series overview
Season	Episodes	Originally released
1	6	May 18, 2022
2	7	January 19, 2024
3	7	April 2, 2025
4	7	April 1, 2026

=== Season 1 (2022) ===
No. overall	No. in season	Title	Original release date
1	1	"Episode 1"	May 18, 2022
2	2	"Episode 2"	May 18, 2022
3	3	"Episode 3"	May 18, 2022
4	4	"Episode 4"	May 18, 2022
5	5	"Episode 5"	May 18, 2022
6	6	"Episode 6"	May 18, 2022

=== Season 2 (2024) ===
No. overall	No. in season	Title	Original release date
7	1	"Episode 1"	January 19, 2024
8	2	"Episode 2"	January 19, 2024
9	3	"Episode 3"	January 19, 2024
10	4	"Episode 4"	January 19, 2024
11	5	"Episode 5"	January 19, 2024
12	6	"Episode 6"	January 19, 2024
13	7	"Episode 7"	January 19, 2024

=== Season 3 (2025) ===
No. overall	No. in season	Title	Original release date
14	1	"Episode 1"	April 2, 2025
15	2	"Episode 2"	April 2, 2025
16	3	"Episode 3"	April 2, 2025
17	4	"Episode 4"	April 2, 2025
18	5	"Episode 5"	April 2, 2025
19	6	"Episode 6"	April 2, 2025
20	7	"Episode 7"	April 2, 2025

=== Season 4 (2026) ===
No. overall	No. in season	Title	Original release date
21	1	"Episode 1"	April 1, 2026
22	2	"Episode 2"	April 1, 2026
23	3	"Episode 3"	April 1, 2026
24	4	"Episode 4"	April 1, 2026
25	5	"Episode 5"	April 1, 2026
26	6	"Episode 6"	April 1, 2026
27	7	"Episode 7"	April 1, 2026

== Reception ==
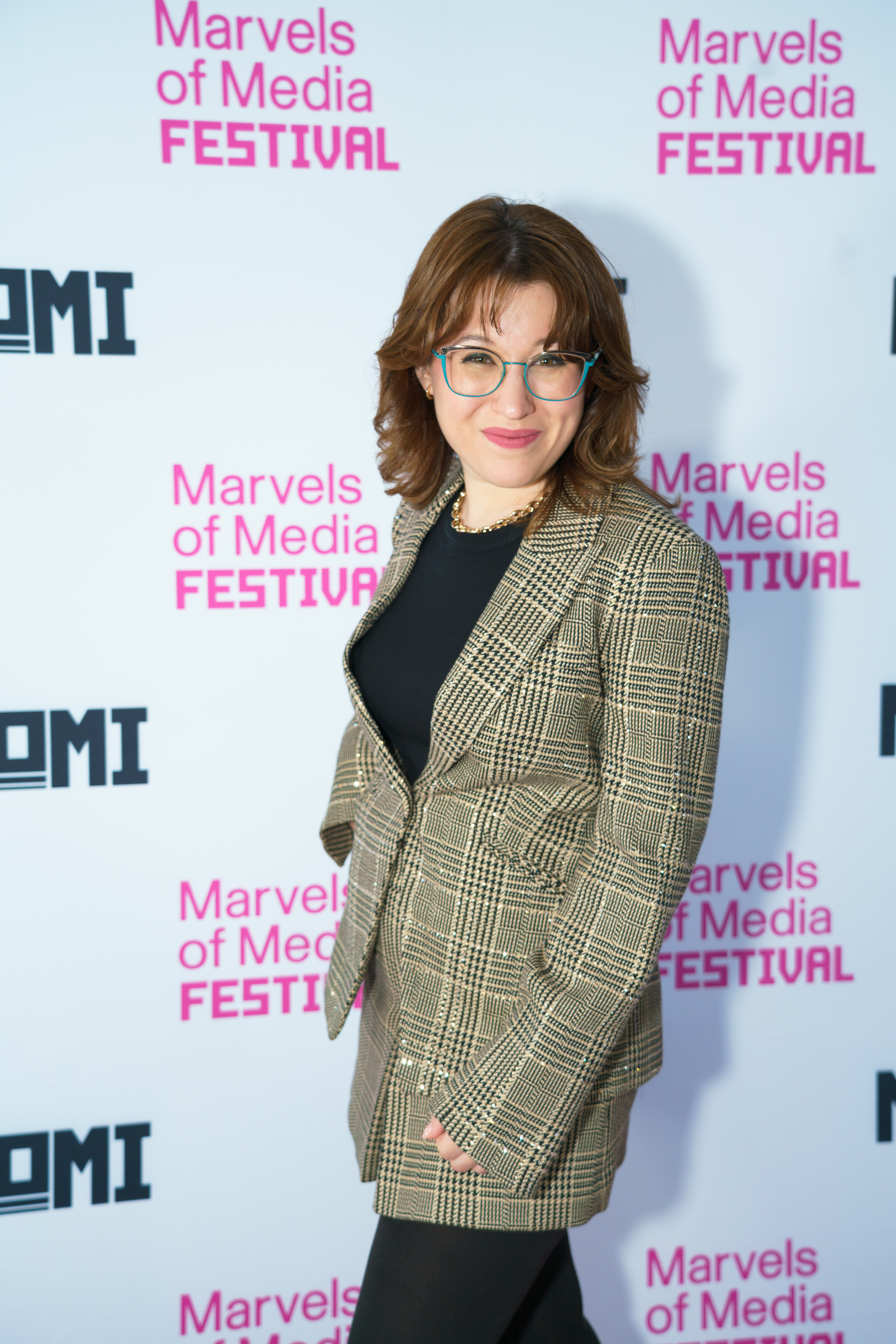
Dani Bowman attends the 5th Annual Marvels of Media Festival at Museum of the Moving Image

Love on the Spectrum received positive reviews from most critics when its first season was released, including a 100-percent critical rating on Rotten Tomatoes and a "Stream it!" from Decider. Some critics highlighted format changes they felt were positive improvements when compared to the Australian version of the show. For example, the American version expanded the age range of the cast by featuring 63-year-old Steve Spitz, featured more types of dating experiences (e.g., online dating, high-school relationships and relationships with non-autistic people), featured a dating coach who is herself autistic and cast participants with co-occurring disabilities (ADHD, dyslexia, etc.). Not all of the differences were praised, however; the absence of LGBTQ relationships in the first season was critiqued. In season two, Journey Early, a lesbian, joined the cast. It was also later revealed that Dani Bowman, who is shown only going on dates with men in the show, is pansexual and heteroromantic. Another critique was the lack of autistic couples who were already together, a departure from the Australian version. In season two, Abbey and David (who were introduced and started dating during season one) had their story followed both in their hometown and on their trip to Africa to see their favorite animal, the lion.

Autistic author and blogger Allison Wall wrote, "Yes, there are problem areas, but in my estimation, the positives outweigh the negatives. Autistic people are shown as empathetic, humanized individuals with a variety of abilities and skills, with agency, as adults, in romantic situations." Wall did question the choice of dating venues, including restaurants. Wall noted, "An environment like that, for me, is not conducive for getting to know a stranger... Would it have been difficult to tailor the dating environments more to what the participants were comfortable with?" O'Clery stated in an interview with Mashable that "...it's all about what that particular person wants and needs. Some go to a restaurant if they want to go to a restaurant." Jill Escher of the National Council on Severe Autism noted: "For many of us in the autism community, Love on the Spectrum might feel like a goofball charade that too conveniently sidesteps the trauma and poverty pervasive among autism families, but for the majority of viewers I do think they will walk away more curious, patient, and caring about autism — which is definitely a gift from Netflix to the autism community."

As the series progressed, it continued to receive praise for its authentic and empathetic portrayal of autistic adults navigating dating. Certain moments gained viral attention on social media, such as candid reactions. Later storylines became more evolved in highlighting complex dynamics in a relationship, even including the first on-screen breakup of a returning couple.

== Awards and nominations ==
Year	Association	Category	Nominees	Result	Ref(s)
2022	Primetime Emmy Award	Outstanding Casting for a Reality Program	Laura Ritchie, Kat Elmore and Jeffrey Marx	Won	
2022	Primetime Emmy Award	Outstanding Picture Editing for an Unstructured Reality Program	Rachel Grierson-Johns, Simon Callow-Wright and John Rosse (for "Episode 1")	Won	
2022	Primetime Emmy Award	Outstanding Unstructured Reality Program	Cian O'Clery, Karina Holden and Stephanie Haber	Won	
2024	Primetime Emmy Award	Outstanding Casting for a Reality Program	Cian O'Clery, Sean Bowman, Marina Nieto Ritger, and Emma Choate	Won	
2024	Primetime Emmy Award	Outstanding Directing for a Reality Program	Cian O'Clery (for "Episode 7")	Won	
2024	Primetime Emmy Award	Outstanding Picture Editing for an Unstructured Reality Program	Rachel Grierson-Johns, Leanne Cole, Toby Stratmann and Gretchen Peterson (for "Episode 7")	Nominated	
2024	Primetime Emmy Award	Outstanding Unstructured Reality Program	Cian O'Clery, Karina Holden and Marina Nieto Ritger	Nominated	
2025	Primetime Emmy Award	Outstanding Casting for a Reality Program	Cian O'Clery, Sean Bowman, and Emma Choate	Won	
2025	Primetime Emmy Award	Outstanding Cinematography for a Reality Program	Geoff Thomas and Cian O'Clery (for "Episode 7")	Nominated	
2025	Primetime Emmy Award	Outstanding Directing for a Reality Program	Cian O'Clery (for "Episode 7")	Nominated	
2025	Primetime Emmy Award	Outstanding Picture Editing for an Unstructured Reality Program	Leanne Cole, Rachel Grierson-Johns, Gretchen Peterson and John Rosser (for "Episode 7")	Nominated	
2025	Primetime Emmy Award	Outstanding Unstructured Reality Program	Cian O'Clery, Karina Holden and Diana Gonzales	Won	
2026	Primetime Emmy Award	Outstanding Casting for a Reality Program	Cian O'Clery, Sean Bowman, Ashley Morgan and Emily Frisbie	Won	
2026	Primetime Emmy Award	Outstanding Cinematography for a Reality Program	Dave May and Cian O'Clery (for "Episode 4")	Nominated	
2026	Primetime Emmy Award	Outstanding Directing for a Reality Program	Cian O'Clery (for "Episode 1")	Nominated	
2026	Primetime Emmy Award	Outstanding Picture Editing for an Unstructured Reality Program	Marcus Kjellberg, Leanne Cole, Kim Lloyd, John Rosser (for "Episode 4")	Won	
2026	Primetime Emmy Award	Outstanding Unstructured Reality Program	Cian O’Clery, Karina Holden and Kelly Martin	Won	
