= New England Center for Children =

Special education residential school in Massachusetts

The New England Center for Children
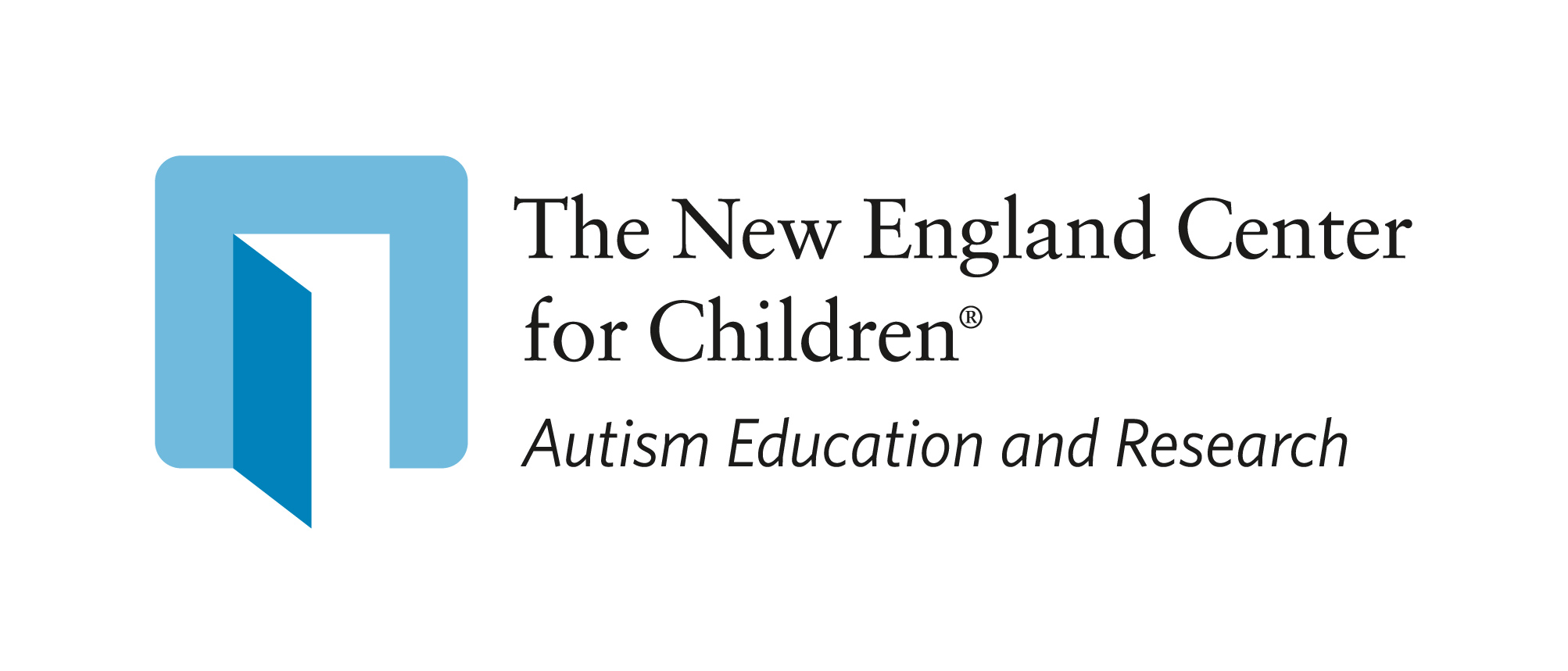

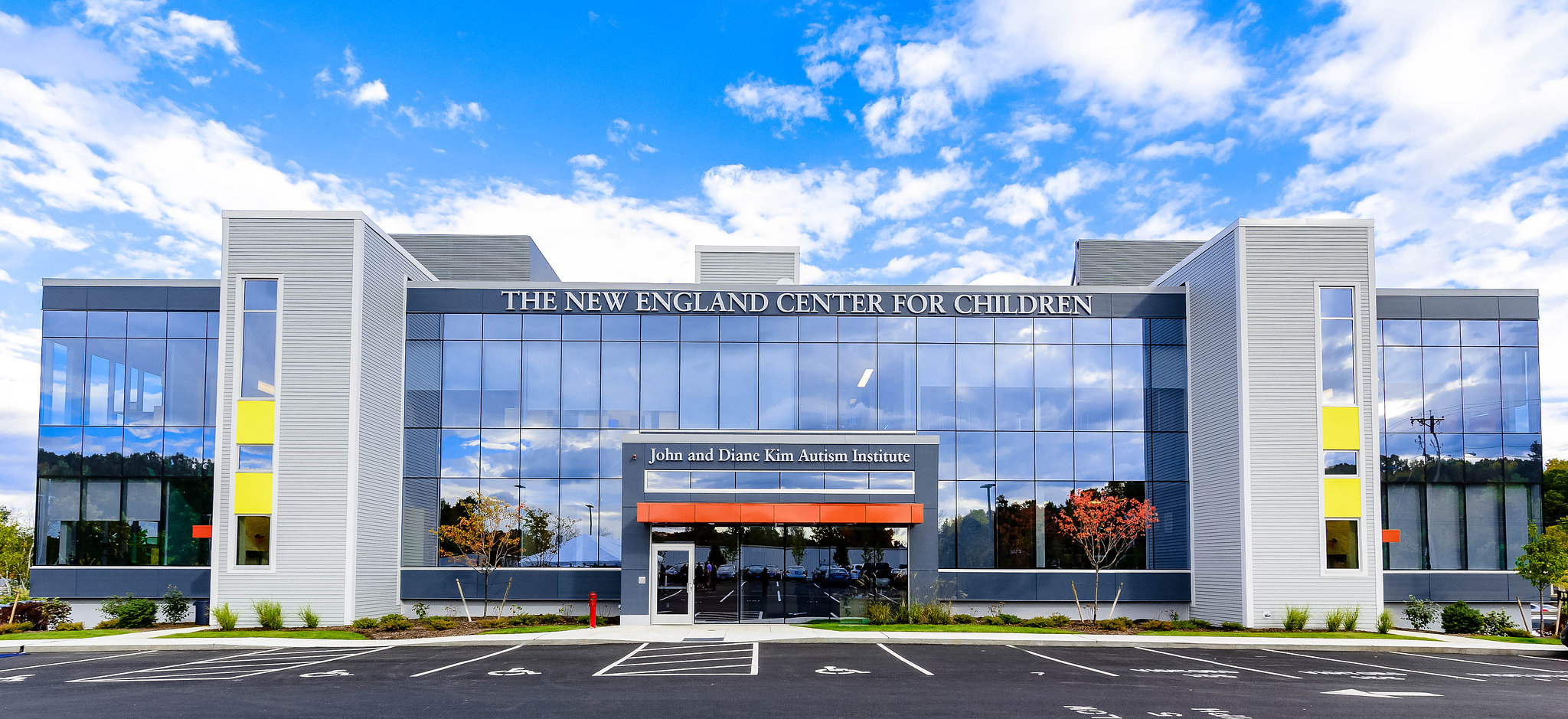
- John and Diane Kim Autism Institute at The New England Center for Children

Location
- 33 Turnpike Road; Southborough, Massachusetts 01772; United States; 42.2963°N 71.4994°W

Information
- Type: Independent private school Residential school Special education
- Religious affiliation: Nonsectarian
- Established: 1975
- Founder: Vincent Strully
- NCES School ID: A9303107
- President: Dr. Jessica Sassi, BCBA-D, LABA (CEO/president)
- Director: Heather Morrison, MS, BCBA, LABA (Executive Director, NECC-Southborough)
- Teaching staff: 95.0 (on an FTE basis)
- Grades: K-12
- Gender: Co-educational
- Enrollment: 220
- Student to teacher ratio: 2.3
- Website: www.necc.org

The New England Center for Children (NECC) is an independently operated, private special education residential school in Southborough, Massachusetts, United States. Established in 1975, NECC provides intensive applied behavior analysis interventions for students with autism spectrum disorder between the ages of 3 and 22 years old.

NECC also has a partner program through which NECC teachers lead special education classrooms in public schools (under the supervision of a BCBA). These classrooms are spread throughout New England.

The Mohammed bin Rashid Center for Special Education, Operated by NECC is a center in Abu Dhabi modeled after the Southborough program. Additionally, NECC has clinics in the Middle East - in Abu Dhabi, Dubai, and Qatar, as well as a consulting practice throughout the region.

The curriculum used at NECC and throughout its programs was developed in-house, and is constantly updated through the research. The Autism Curriculum Encyclopedia (ACE) ABA Software System is commercially available and is used by over 12,000 learners with autism worldwide.

Research is a cornerstone of NECC's mission and programming. The research program was established in 1978 under the guidance of Dr. Paul Touchette. Since then, NECC researchers have authored or co-authored more than 340 articles published in peer-reviewed journals and have presented research at more than 2,700 professional conferences around the globe. Research remains is integral to everything NECC does, and to that end, onsite graduate programs exist for staff who wish to pursue master's or doctorates in the fields of special education or behavior analysis. The school partners with Simmons University and Western New England University for those programs. NECC researchers are widely published and present their studies all over the world.

== History ==
Founded as the Efficacy Research Institute by Vincent Strully Jr., Dudley Orr, and John Pangburn in 1975, it was initially located in the Taunton State Hospital in Taunton, Massachusetts. In 1986, the school's name changed to the New England Center for Autism and relocated to Southborough before the title revised again to the New England Center for Children in 1996.

In 1997, NECC established a private program in Abu Dhabi and a consulting practice throughout the Gulf Cooperation Council (GCC).

In 2000, NECC receives the National Award for Model Professional Development from the U.S. Department of Education. In 2003, the first lesson is published to the ACE app developed at the school, and by 2006, the ACE expanded to other schools.

Under the direction of His Highness Sheikh Mohammed bin Zayed Al Nahyan, Crown Prince of Abu Dhabi, a school was opened in 2007 (NECC - Abu Dhabi). Six years later (2013), a state-of-the-art facility was built in Mohammed Bin Zayed City to house the school, which was renamed MRC-NECC.

After a successful capital campaign, the John and Diane Kim Autism Institute opened on the Southborough campus to house the organizations business units, research space, and classrooms for professional development. The construction made room for renovations to the school building to include a Student Center with dedicated space for Music/Art, Library, Leisure Center, and career development center for the vocational services department.

In 2023, a new onsite dental suite was constructed to provide dental services as well as to house NECC's dental desensitization program. That same year, NECC's founder, president, and CEO, Vinnie Strully, stepped aside to transition leadership to Dr. Jessica Sassi, BCBA-D, LABA.
