= Primetime Emmy Award for Outstanding Guest Actress in a Drama Series =

Emmy award

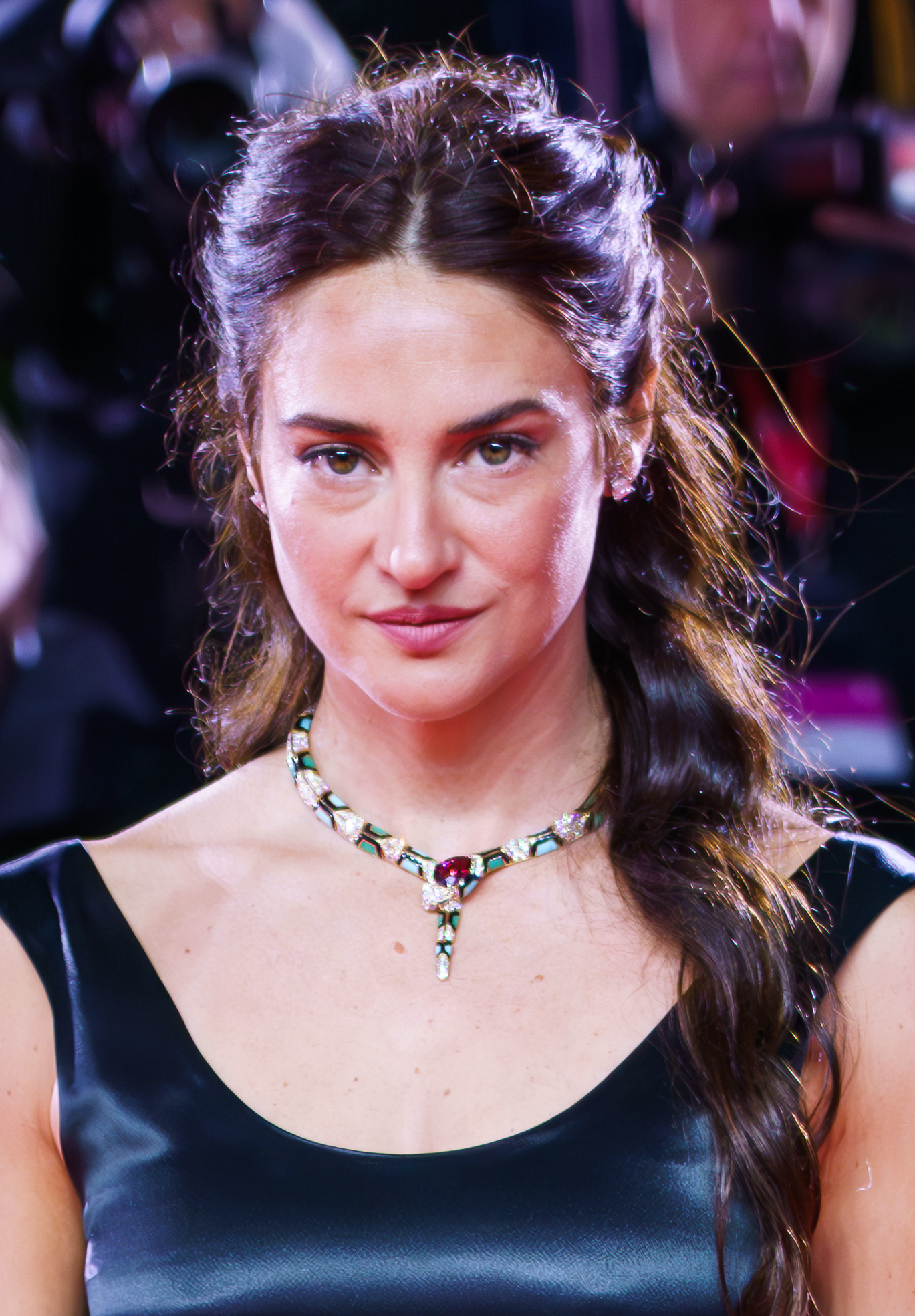
- The 2026 recipient: Shailene Woodley
- Awarded for: Outstanding Performance by a Guest Actress in a Drama Series
- Country: United States
- Presented by: Academy of Television Arts & Sciences
- First award: 1975
- Currently held by: Shailene Woodley, Paradise (2026)
- Website: http://www.emmys.com

The Primetime Emmy Award for Outstanding Guest Actress in a Drama Series is an award that is presented annually by the Academy of Television Arts & Sciences (ATAS). It is given in honor of an actress who has delivered an outstanding performance in a guest starring role on a television drama series for the primetime network season.

The award was first presented at the 27th Primetime Emmy Awards on May 19, 1975, to Zohra Lampert, for her performance on Kojak, and to Cloris Leachman, for her role on The Mary Tyler Moore Show. It has undergone several name changes, originally honoring single leading and supporting appearances in drama and comedy series through 1978. The award was re-introduced at the 38th Primetime Emmy Awards under the name Outstanding Guest Performer in a Drama Series, honoring actors and actresses in guest starring roles on television drama series. In 1989, the category was split into categories for each gender, resulting in the name change to its current title. Beginning with the 77th Primetime Emmy Awards, performers are no longer eligible in guest acting categories if they were previously nominated for a lead or supporting award for playing the same character role in the same series.

Since its inception, the award has been given to 35 actresses. Patricia Clarkson, Cherry Jones, Shirley Knight, Margo Martindale, Amanda Plummer, and Alfre Woodard have won the most awards in this category, with two each. Jones and Cicely Tyson have been nominated for the award on five occasions each, the most in the category. Meanwhile, Law & Order: Special Victims Unit holds the most awardees, with 5 winners coming from the show.

== Winners and nominations ==
Listed below are the winners of the award for each year, as well as the other nominees.

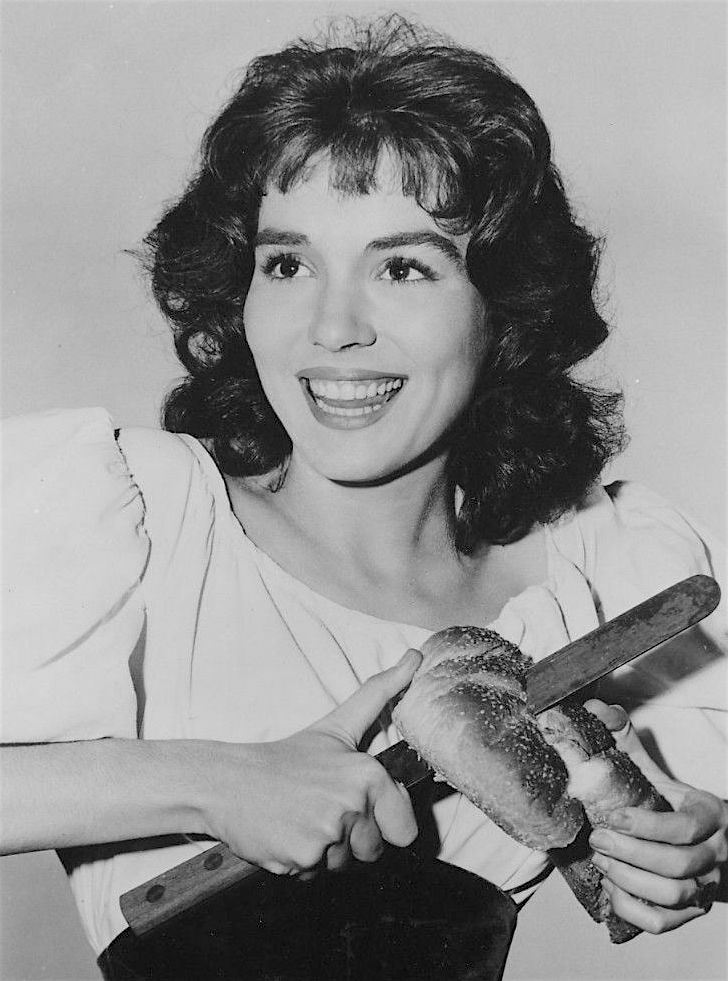
Zohra Lampert was the first recipient in the category, winning for her performance in Kojak (1975).

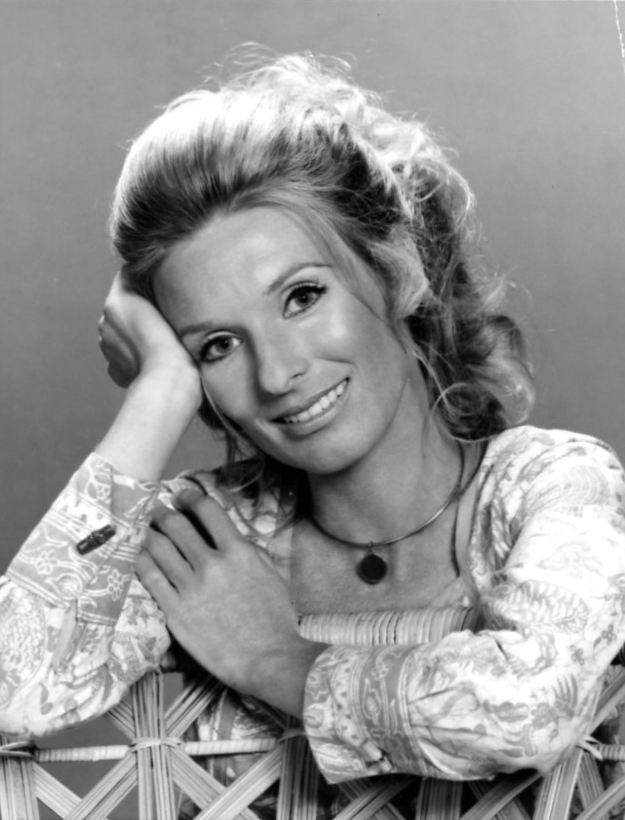
Cloris Leachman won twice in 1975 and 1998.

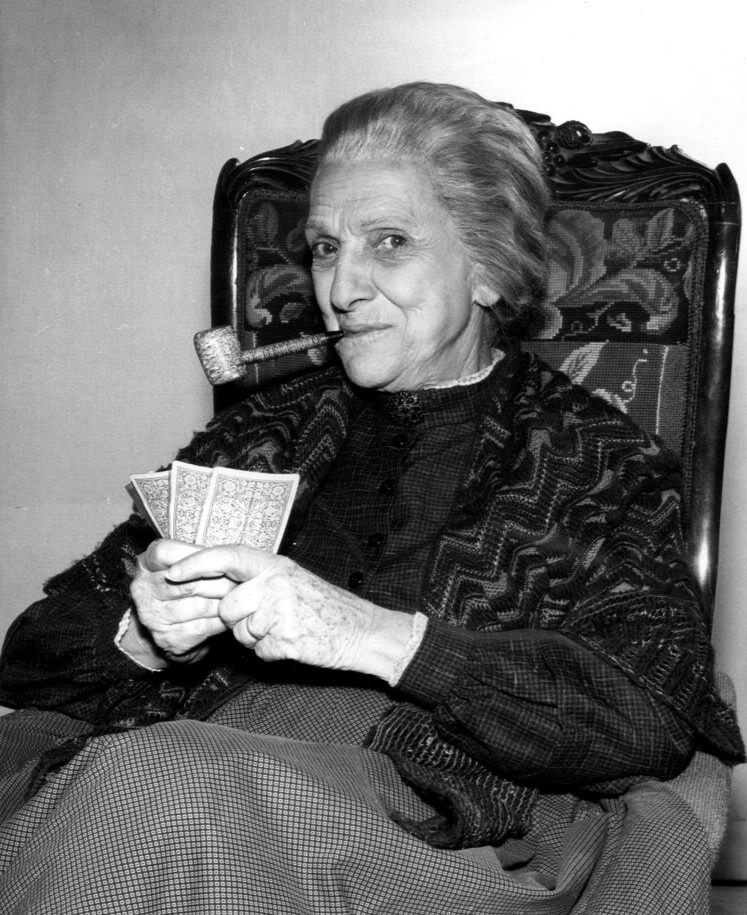
Beulah Bondi won for The Waltons (1977).

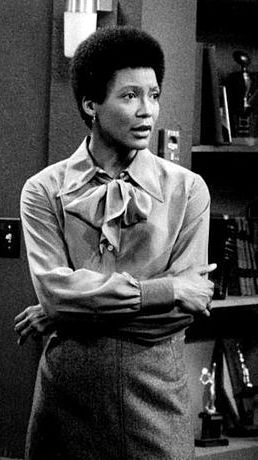
Olivia Cole won for Roots (1977).

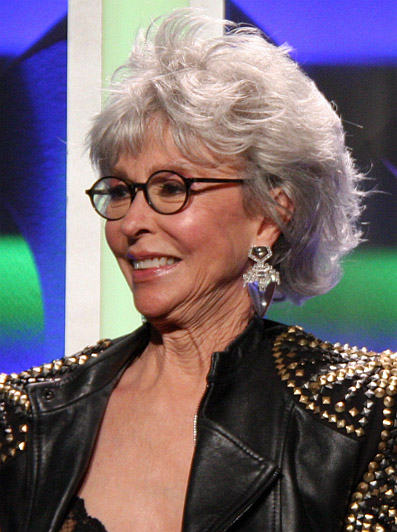
Rita Moreno won for The Rockford Files (1978).

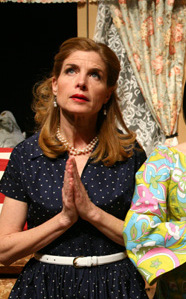
Blanche Baker won for Holocaust (1977).

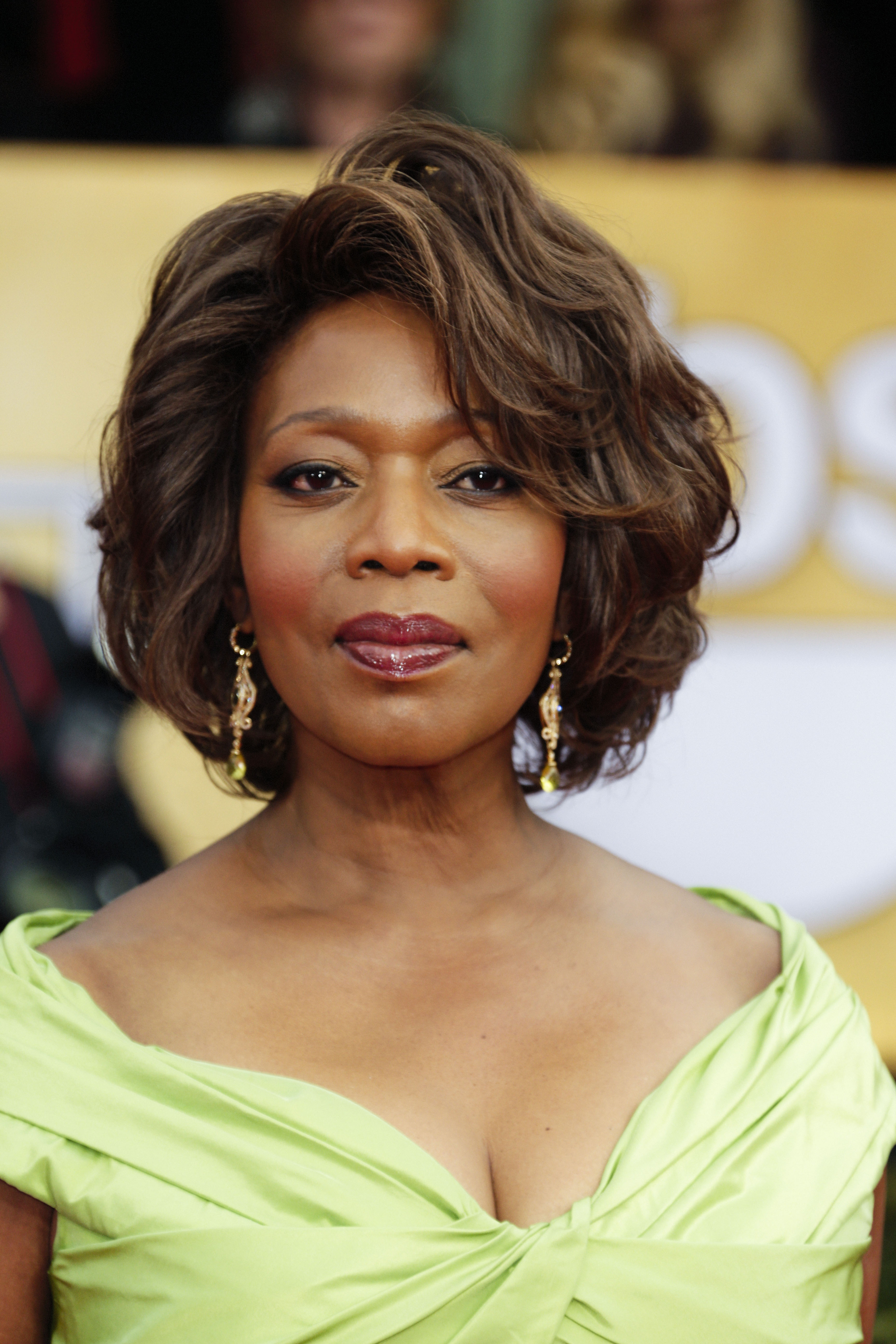
Alfre Woodard won twice for L.A. Law (1987) and The Practice (2003).

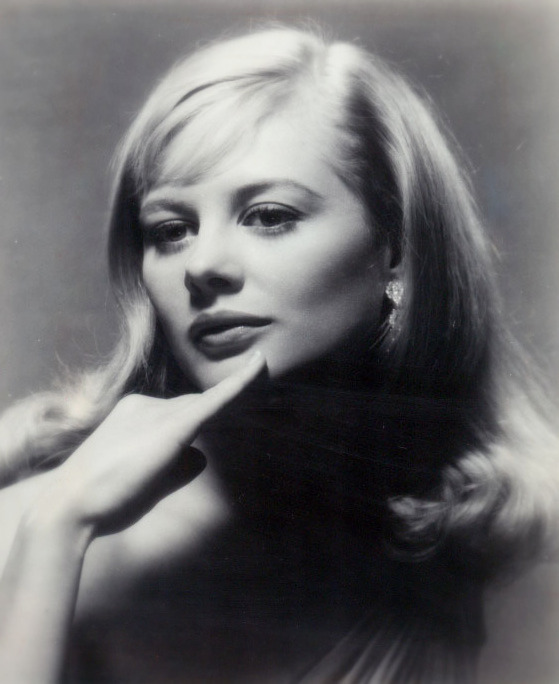
Shirley Knight won twice for thirtysomething (1988) and NYPD Blue (1995).

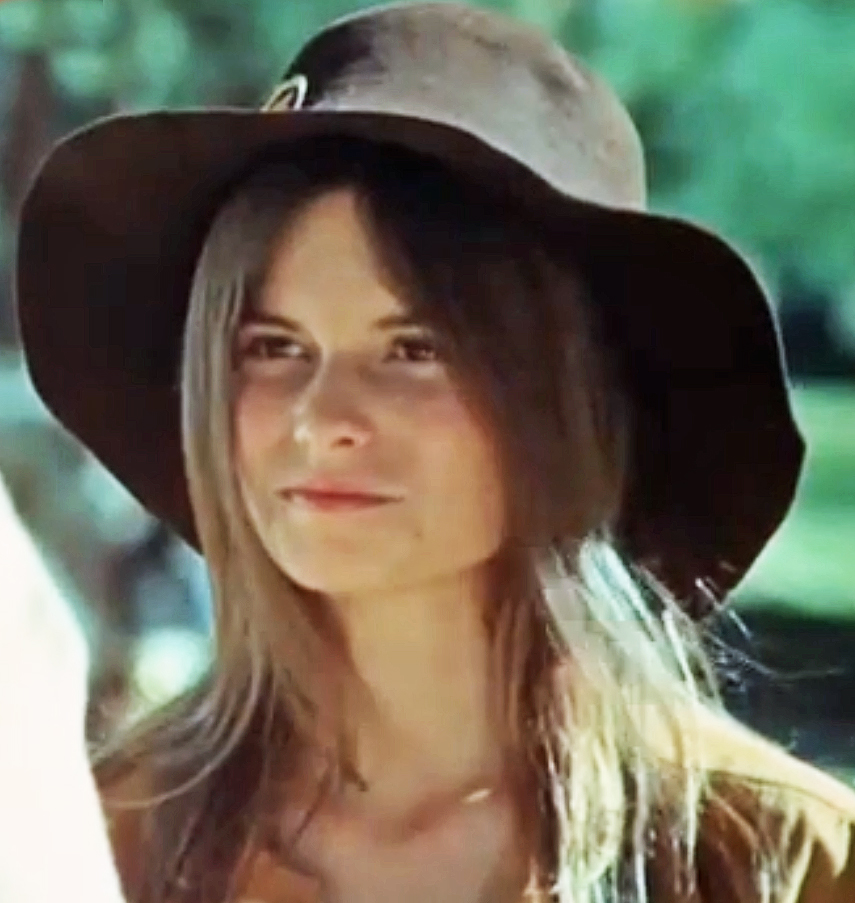
Kay Lenz won for Midnight Caller (1989).

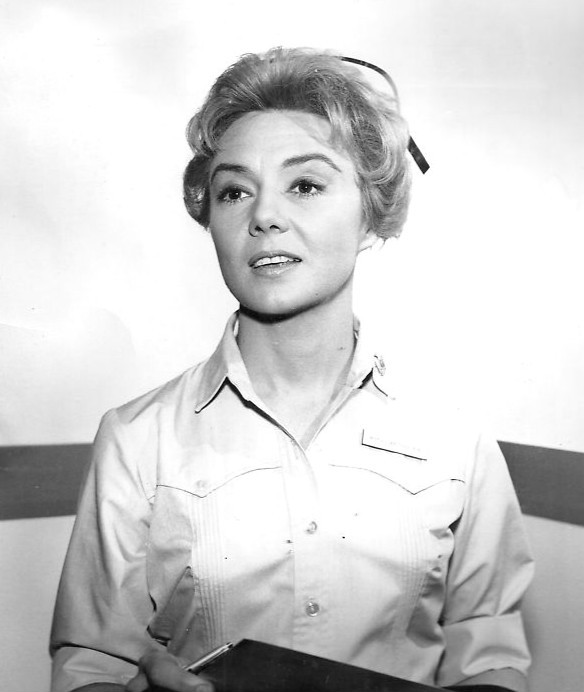
Peggy McCay won for The Trials of Rosie O'Neill (1991).

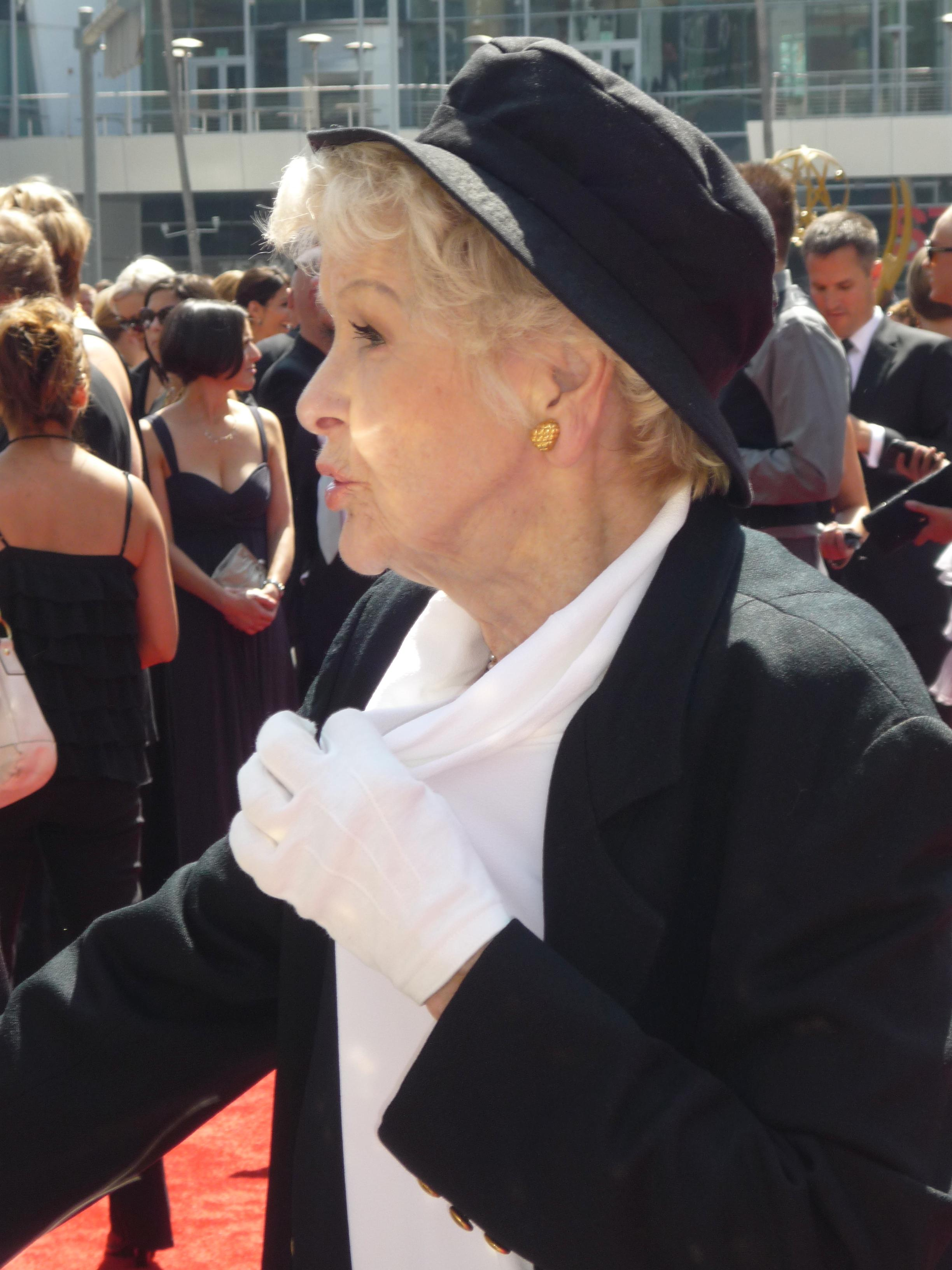
Elaine Stritch won for Law & Order (1993).

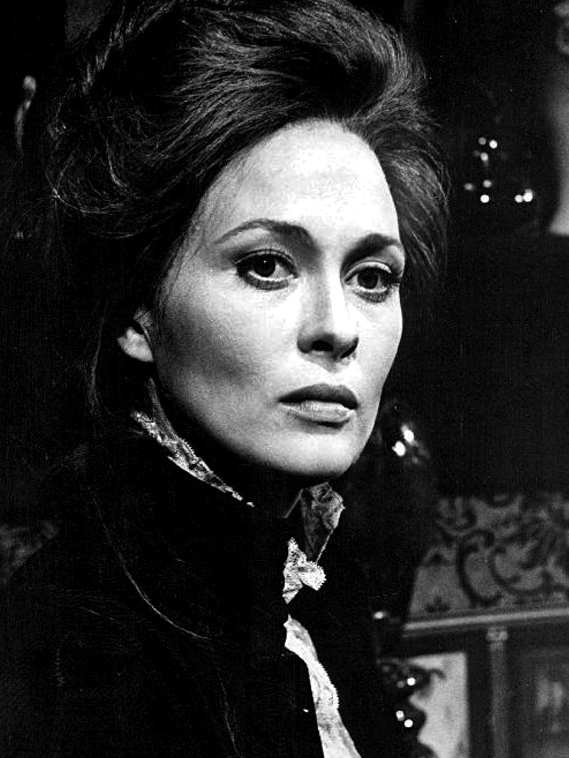
Faye Dunaway won for Columbo: It's All in the Game (1994).

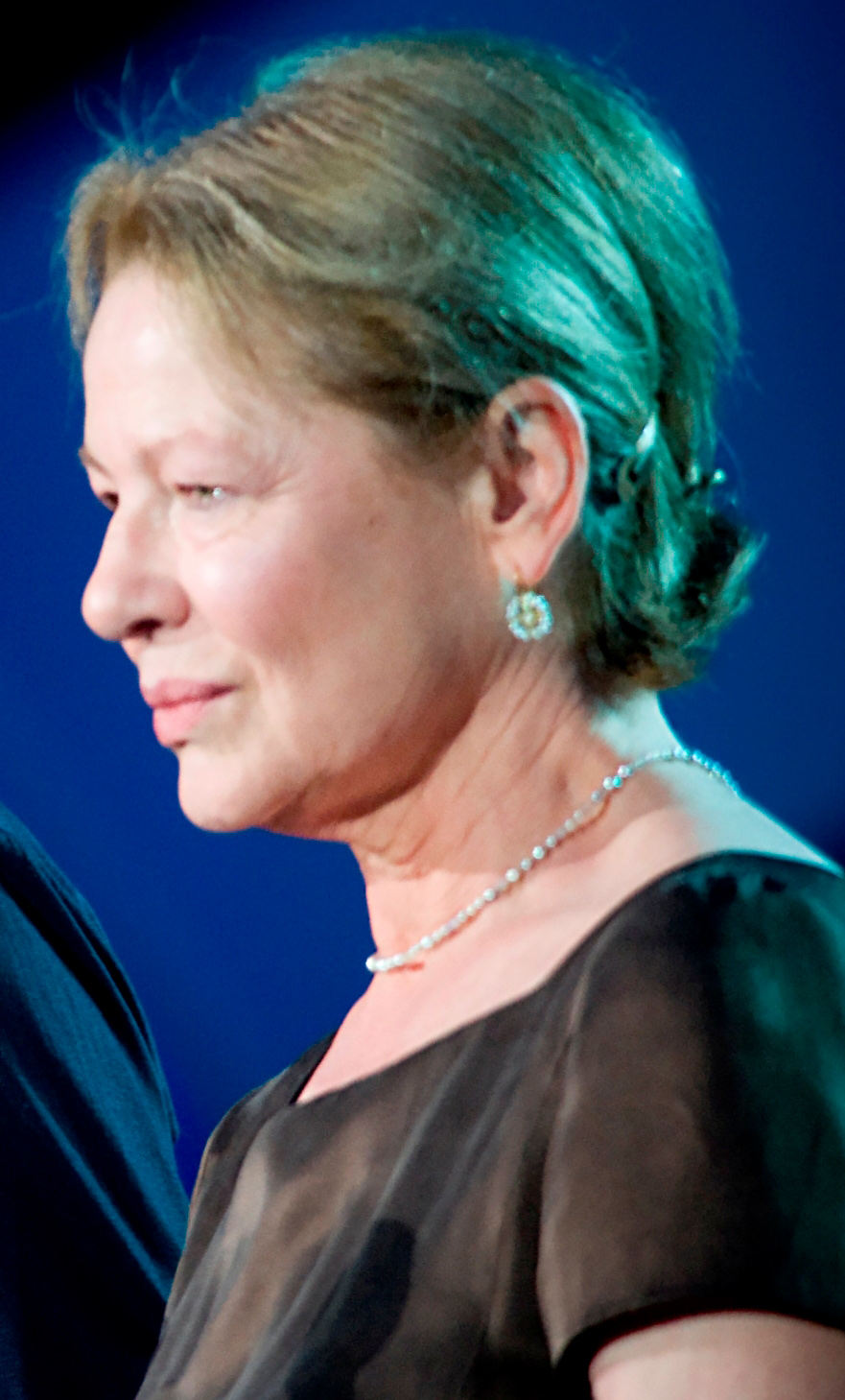
Dianne Wiest won for Road to Avonlea (1997).

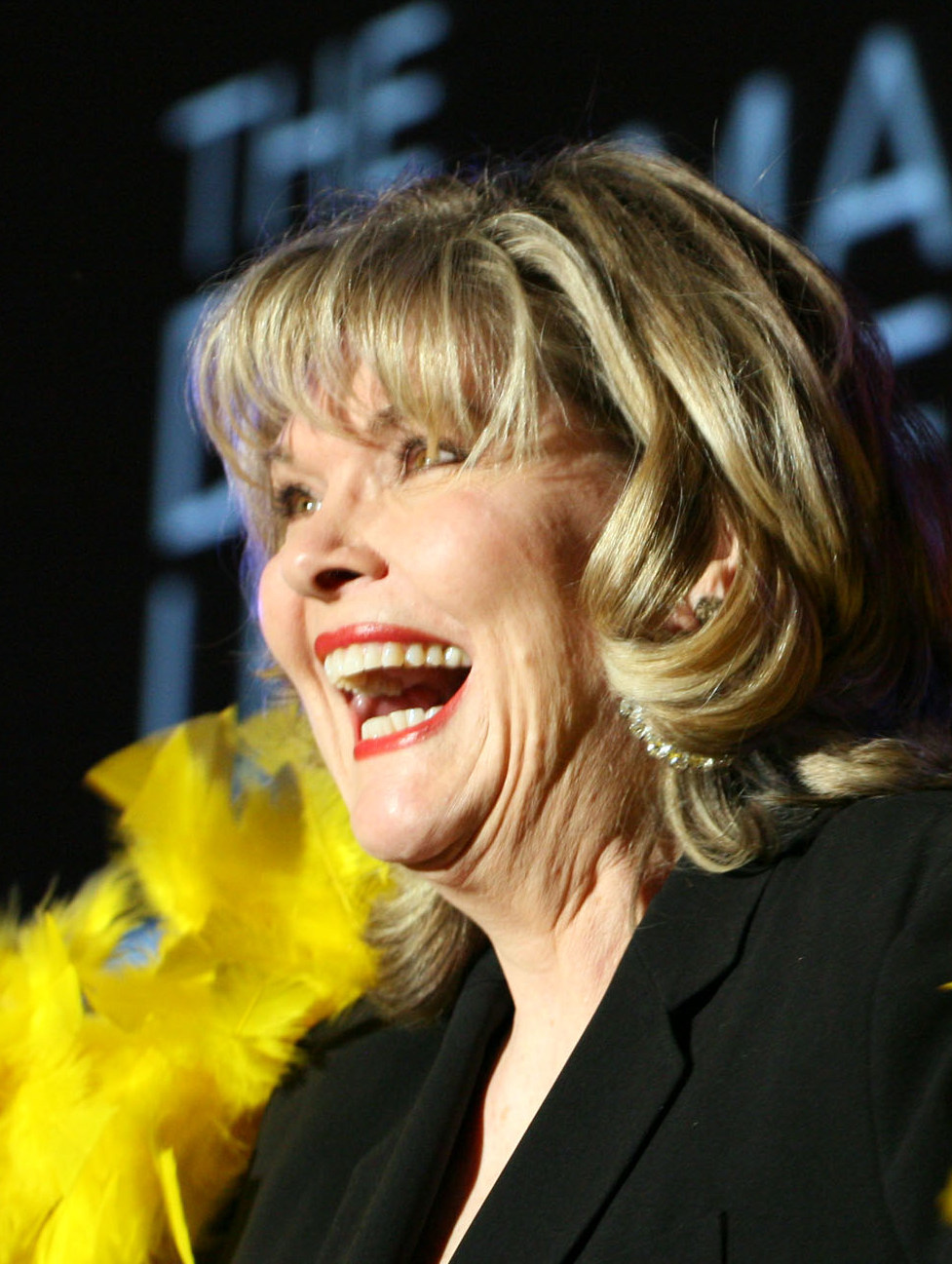
Debra Monk won for NYPD Blue (1999).

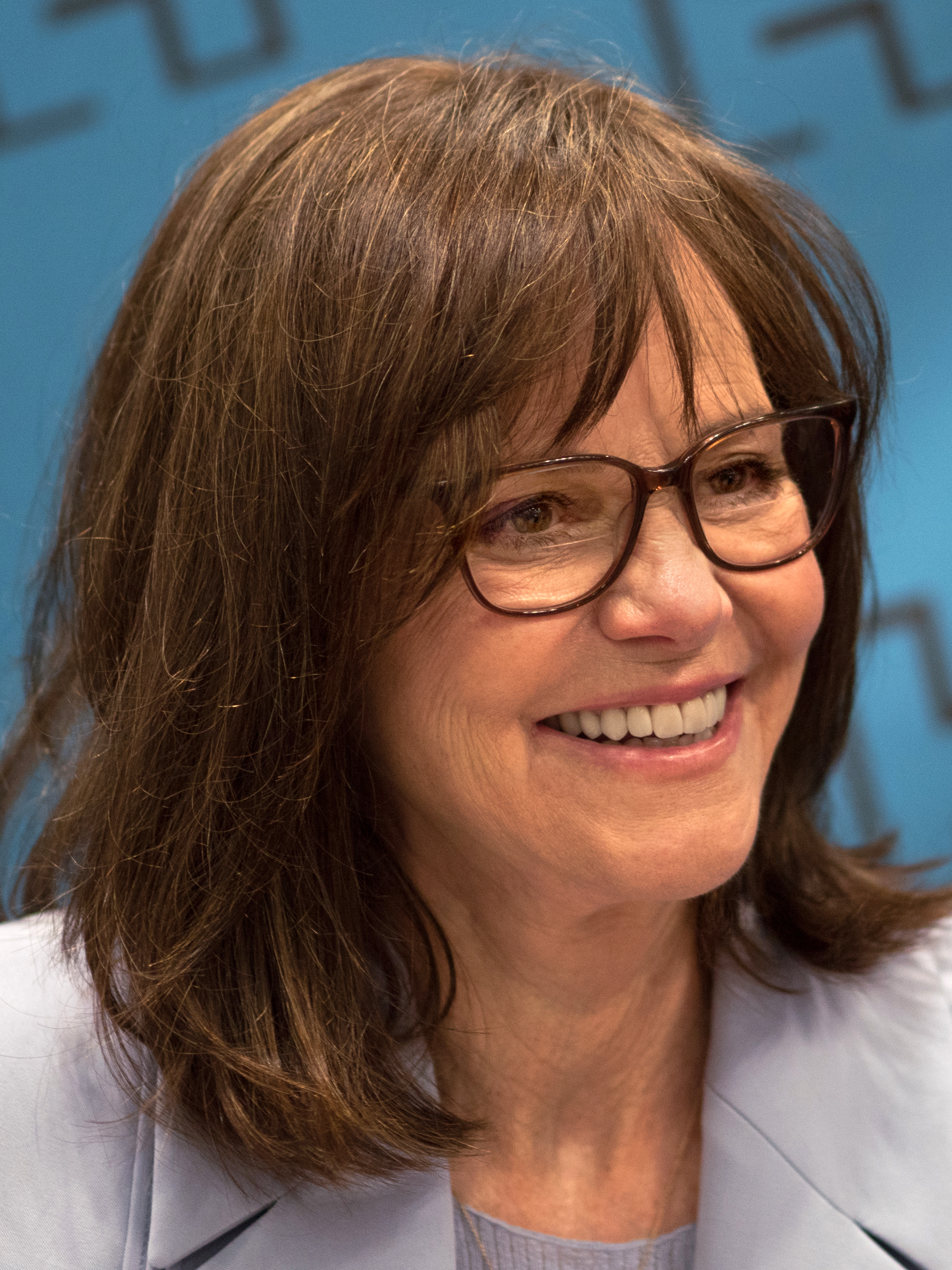
Sally Field won for ER (2001).

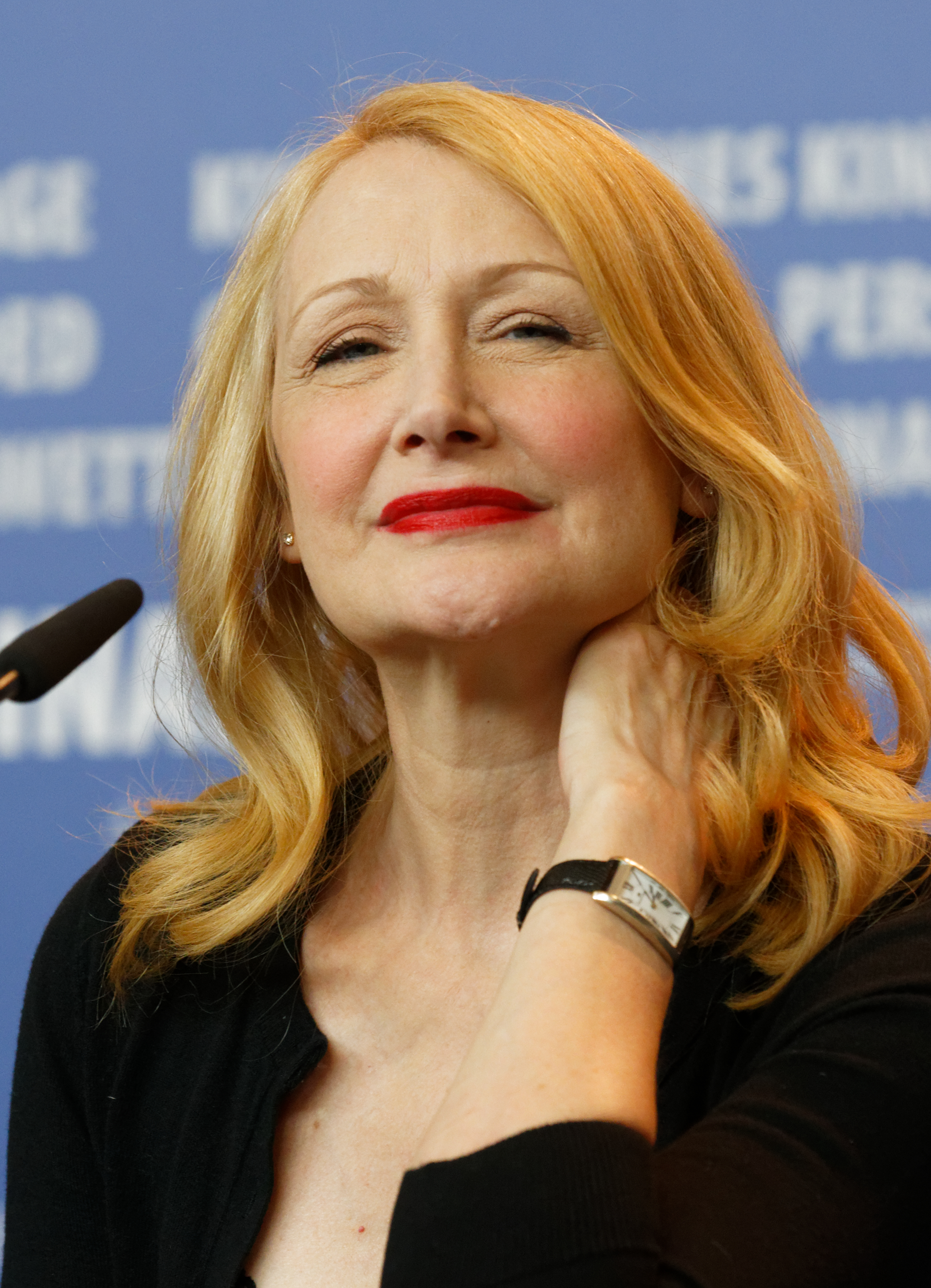
Patricia Clarkson twice for Six Feet Under (2002, 2006).

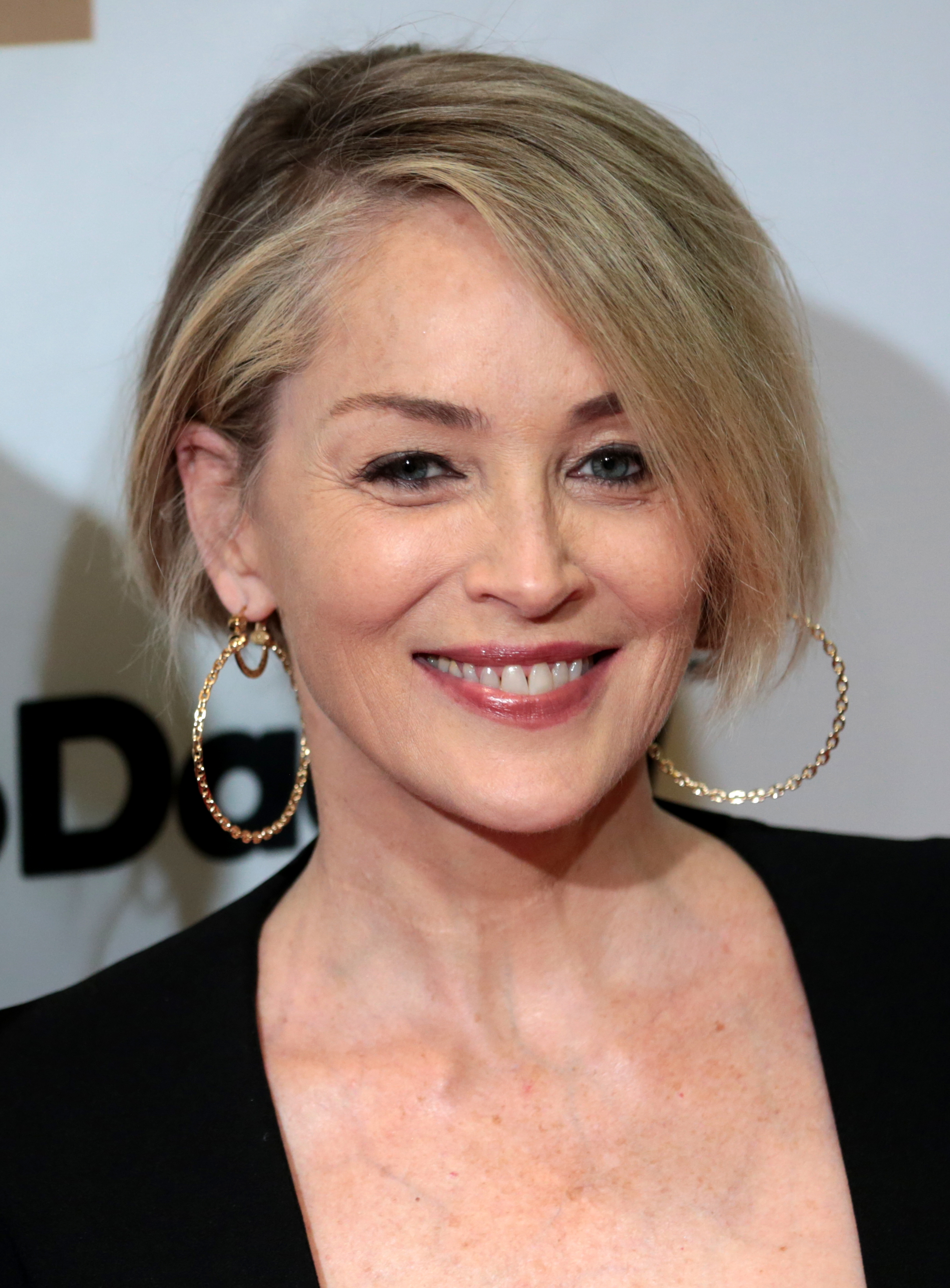
Sharon Stone won for The Practice (2004).

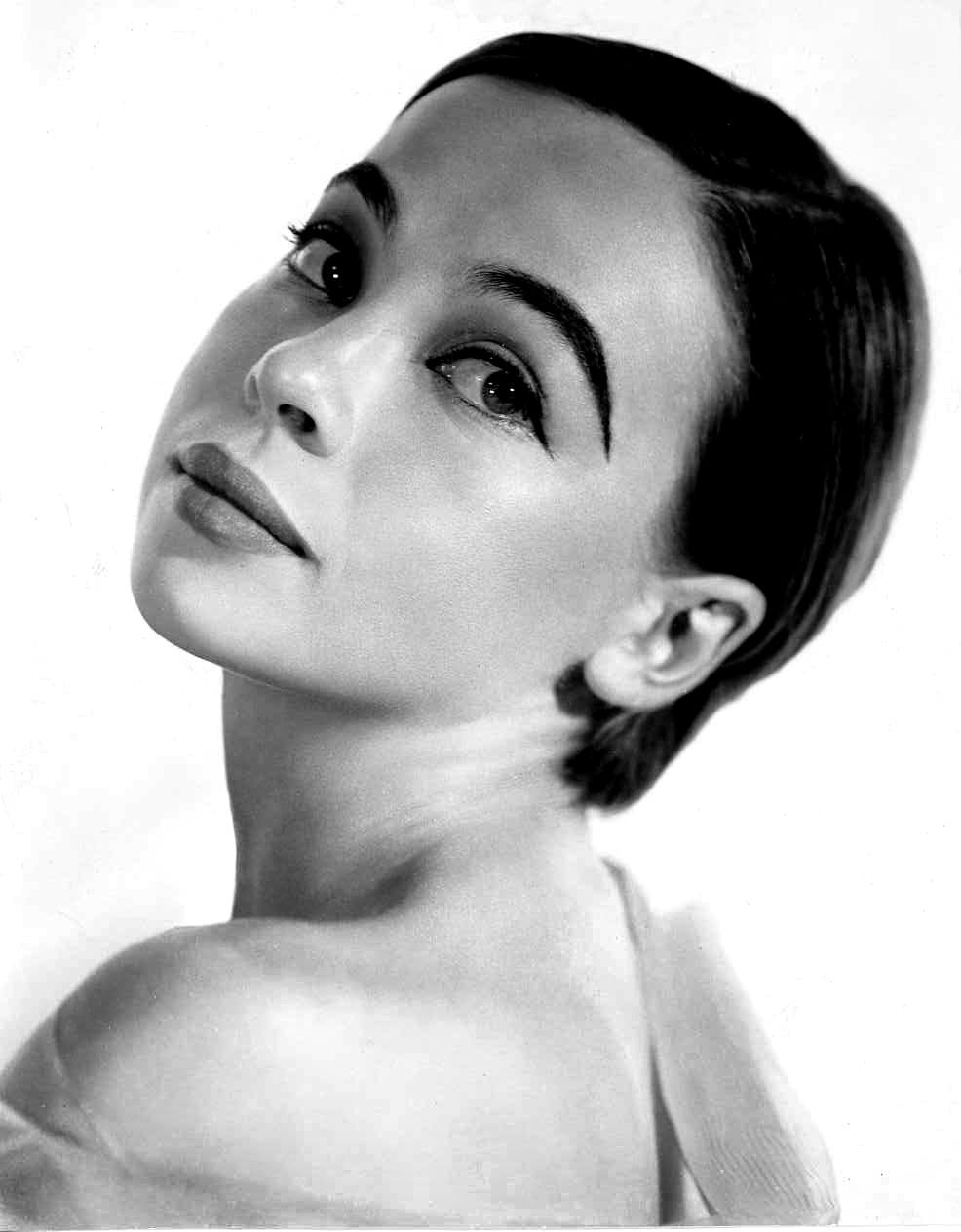
Leslie Caron won for Law & Order: Special Victims Unit (2007).

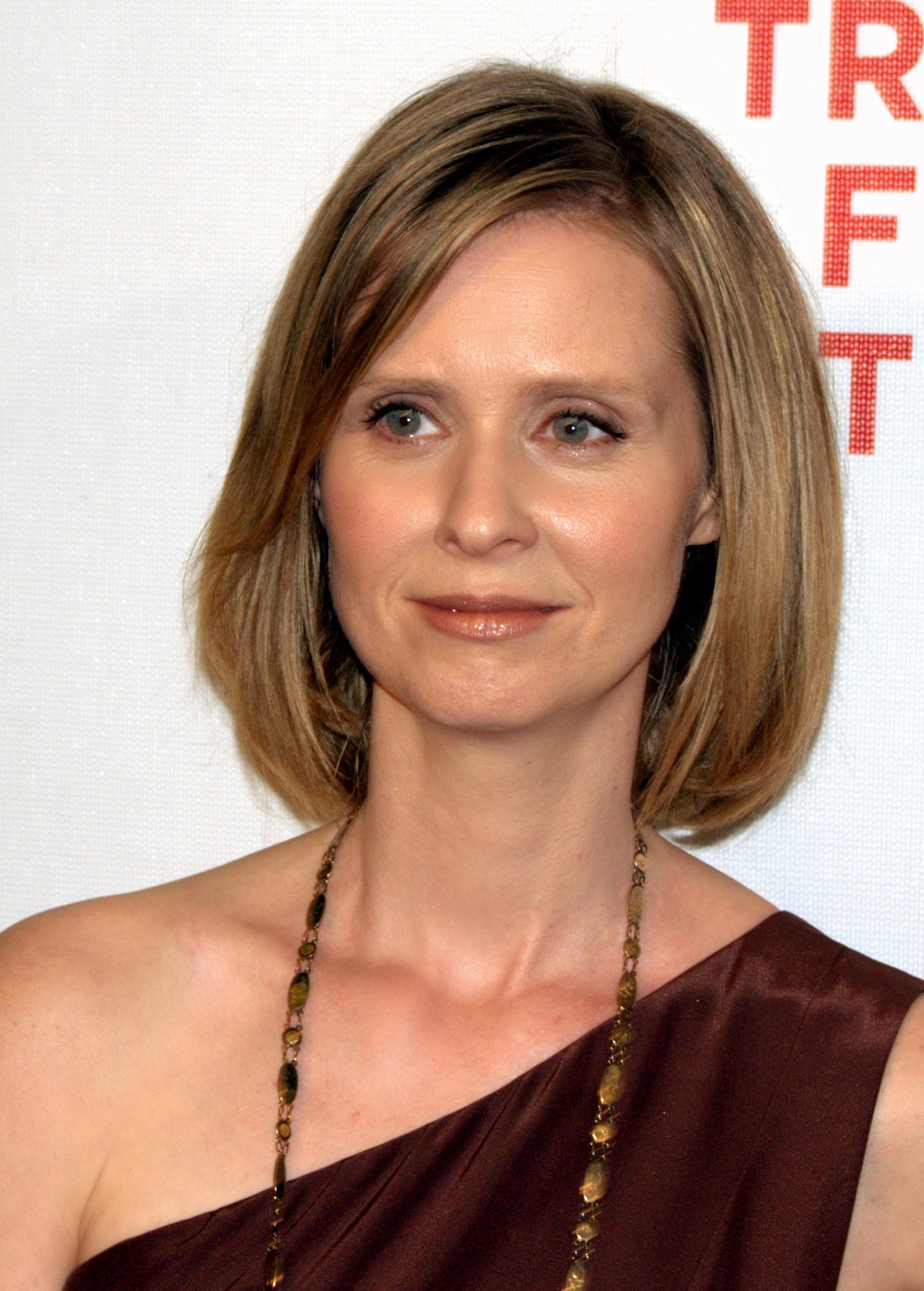
Cynthia Nixon won for Law & Order: SVU (2008).

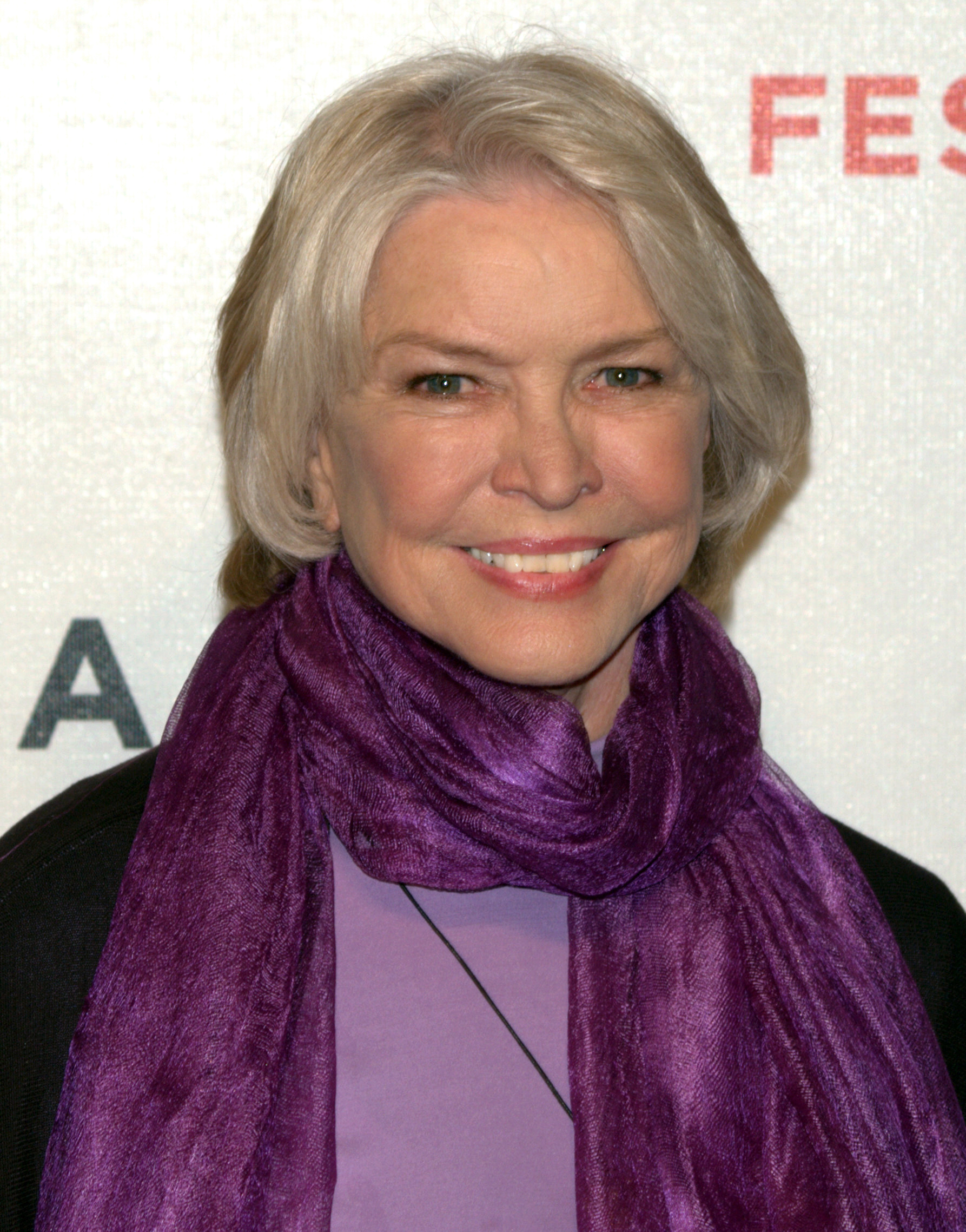
Ellen Burstyn won for Law & Order: Special Victims Unit (2009).

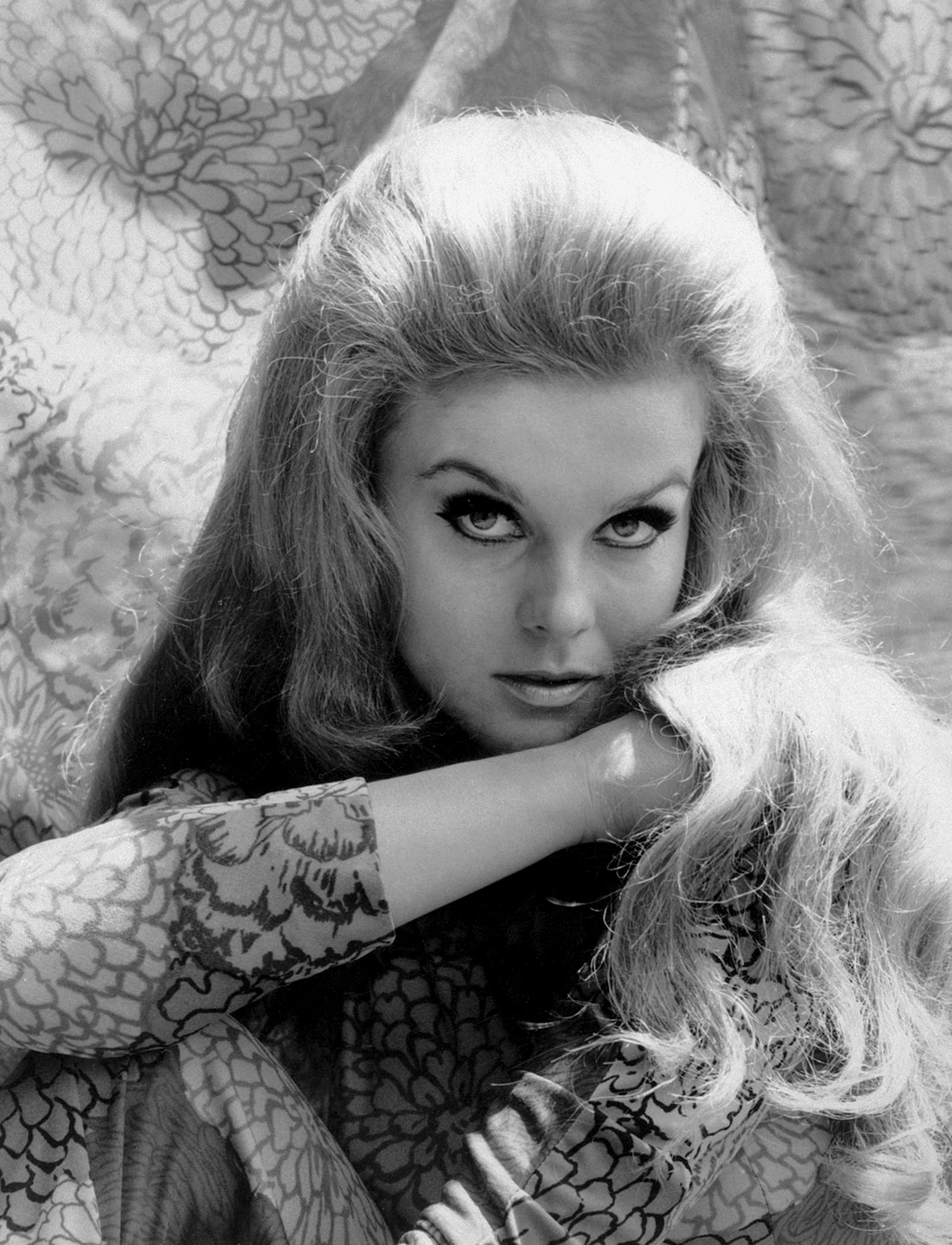
Ann-Margret won for Law & Order: SVU (2010)

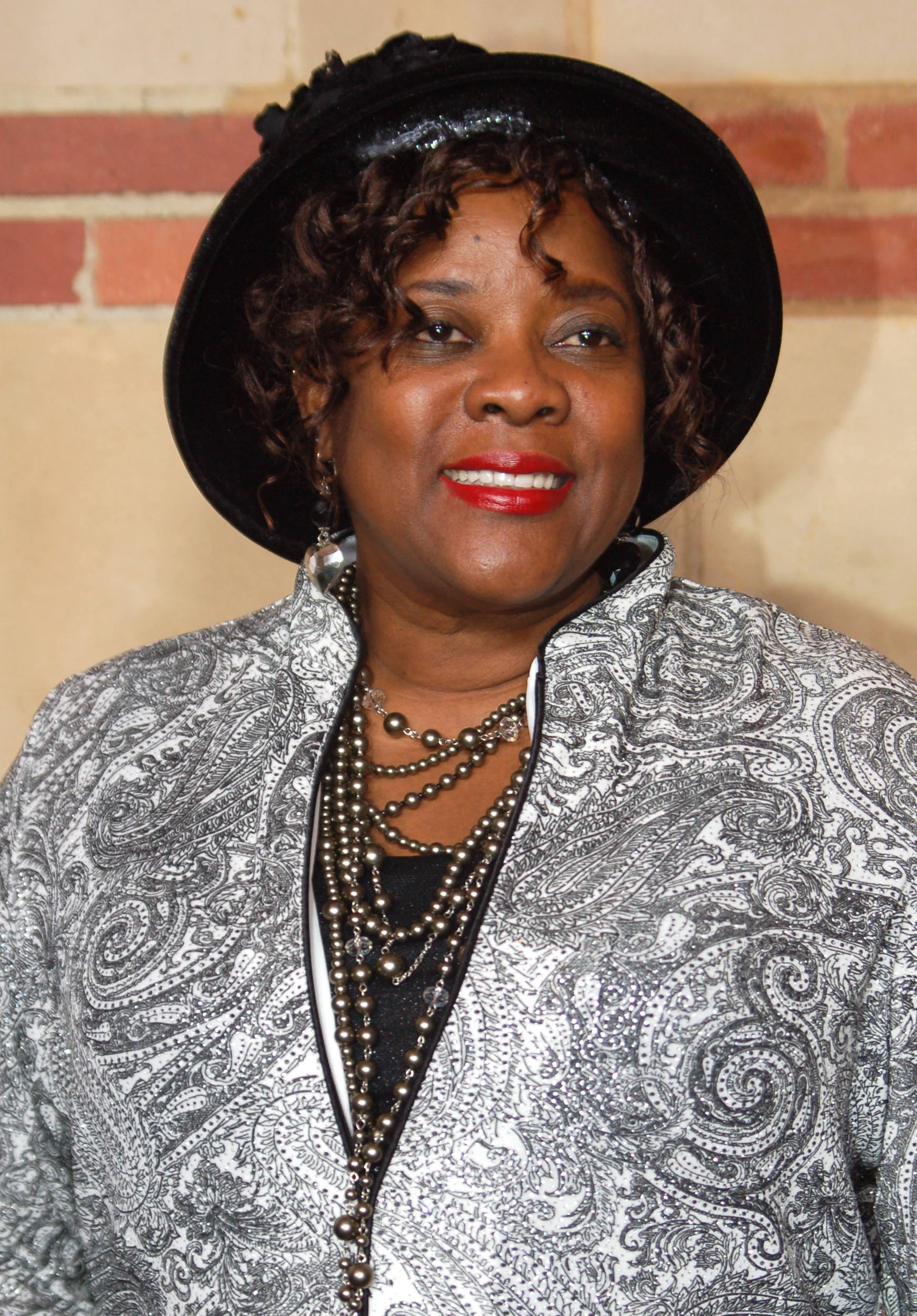
Loretta Devine won for Grey's Anatomy (2011).

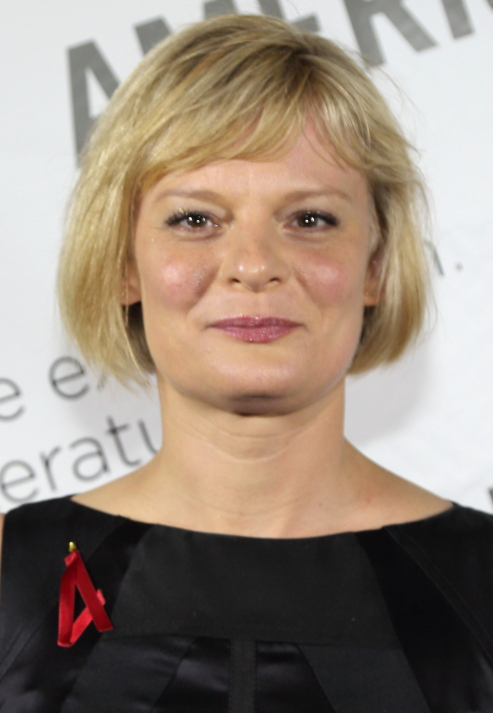
Martha Plimpton won for The Good Wife (2012).

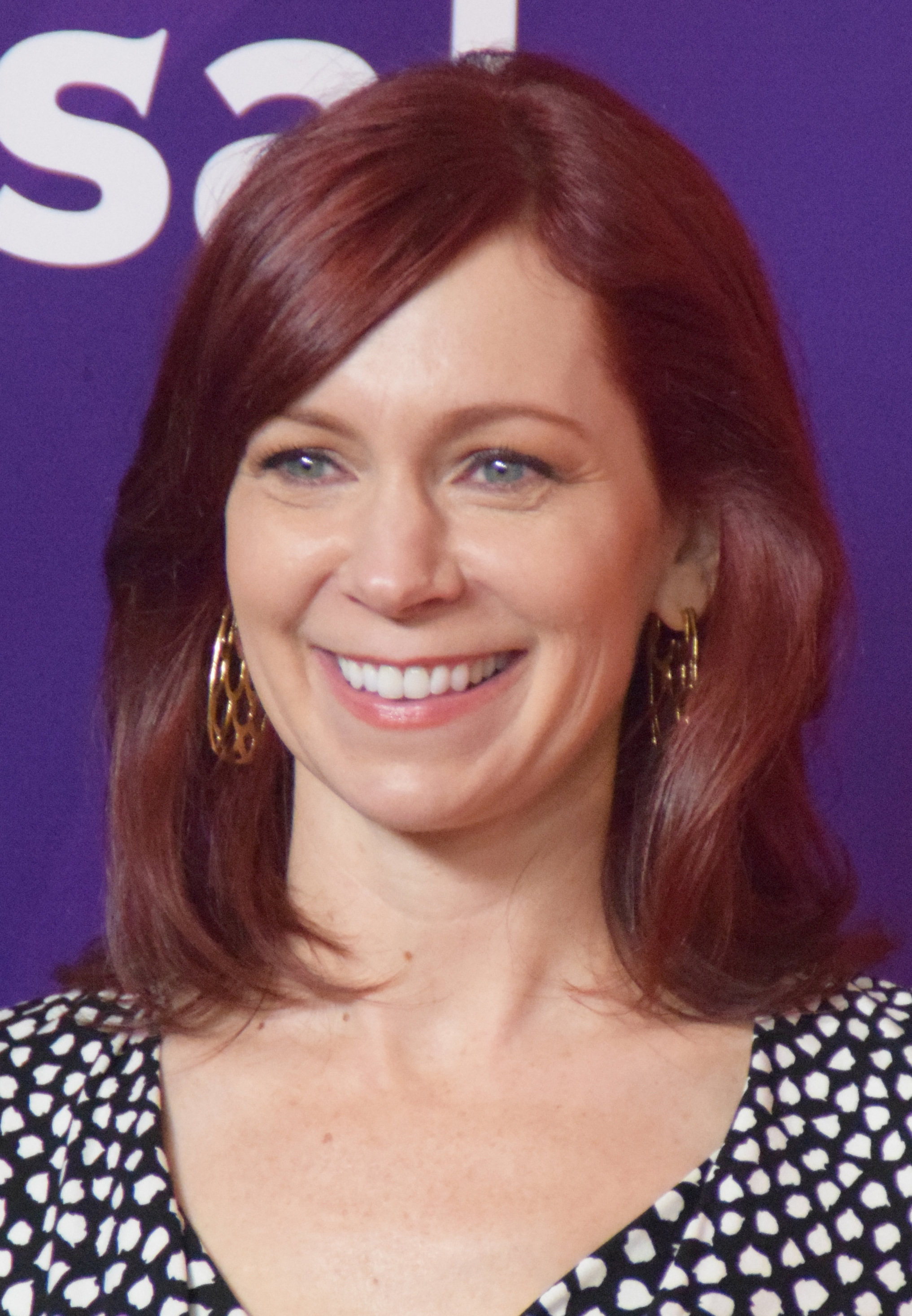
Carrie Preston won for The Good Wife (2013).

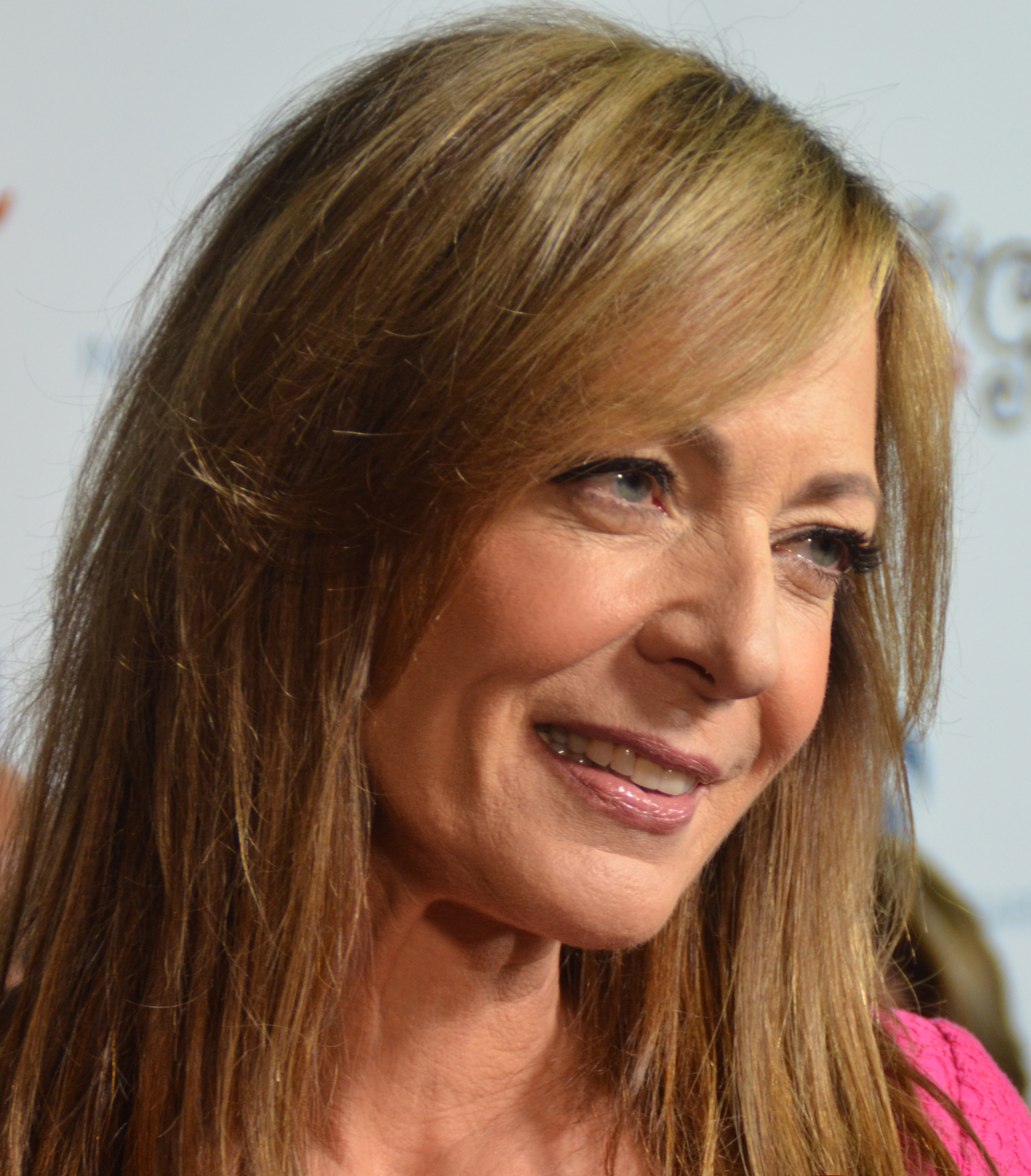
Allison Janney won for Masters of Sex (2014).

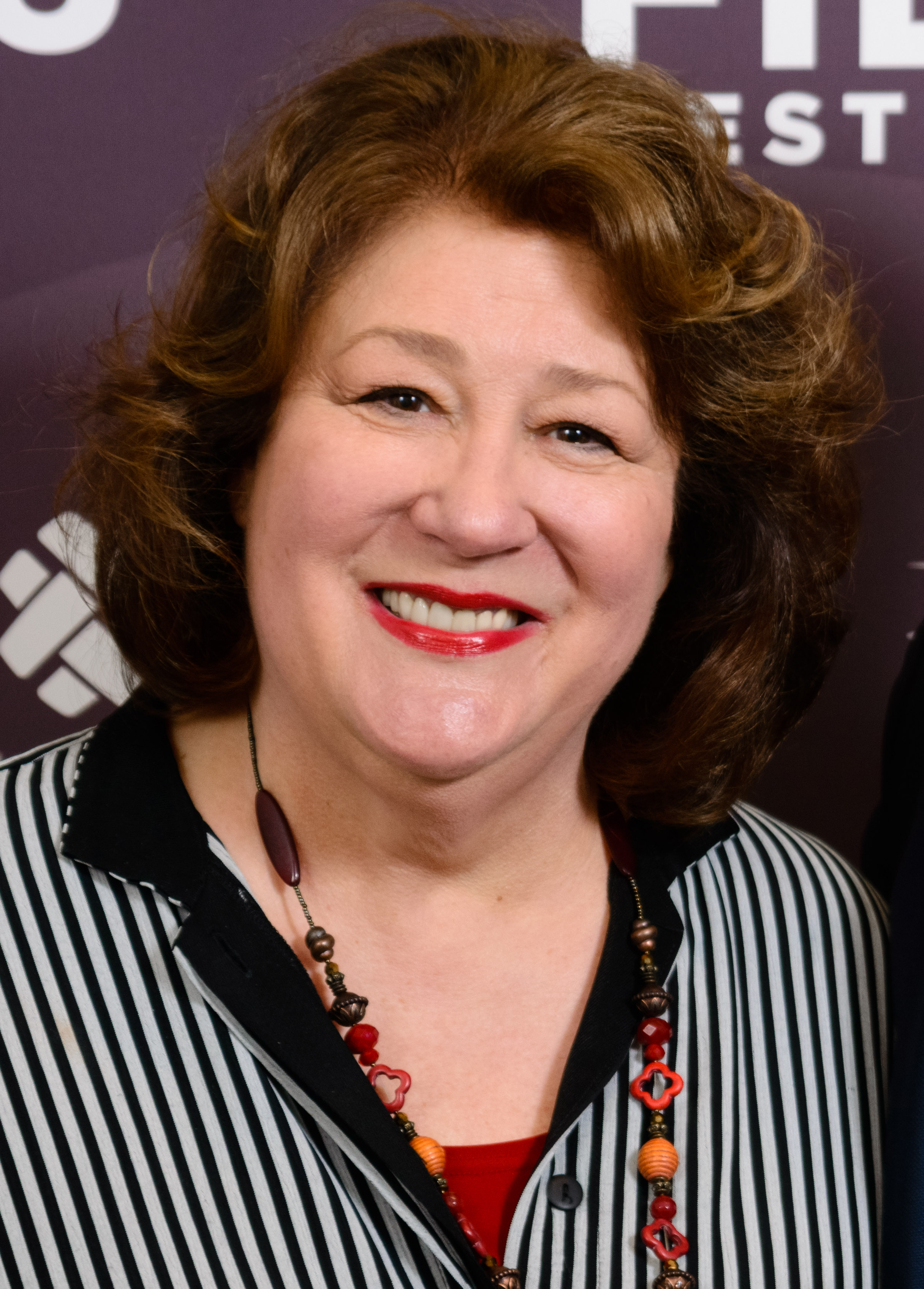
Margo Martindale won twice consecutively for The Americans (2014, 2015).

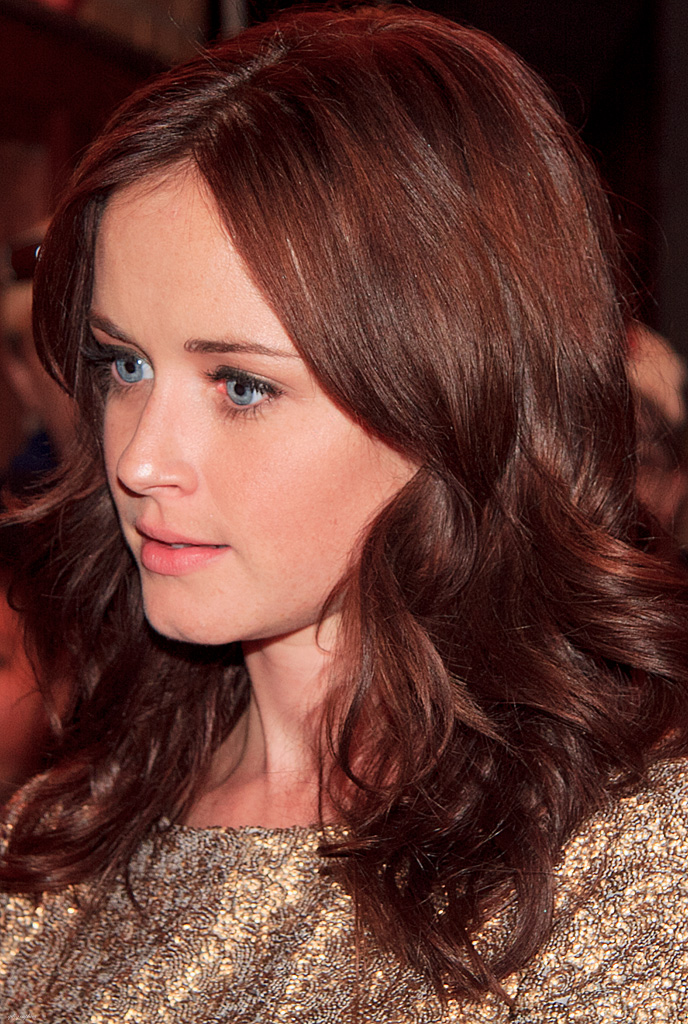
Alexis Bledel won for The Handmaid's Tale (2017).

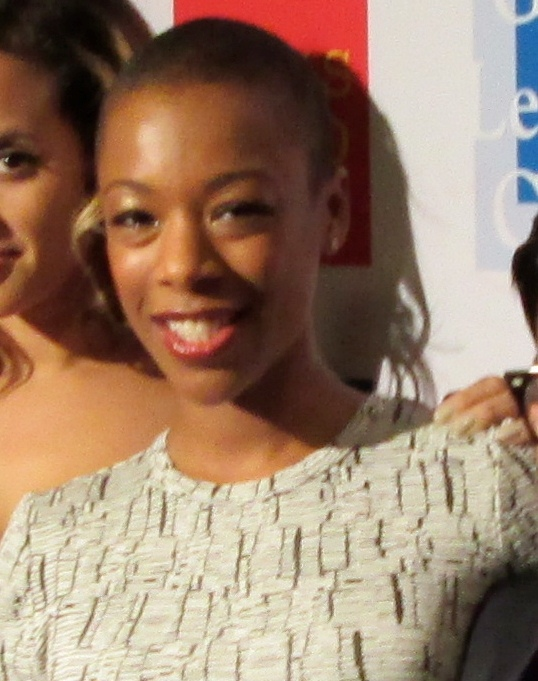
Samira Wiley won for The Handmaid's Tale (2018).

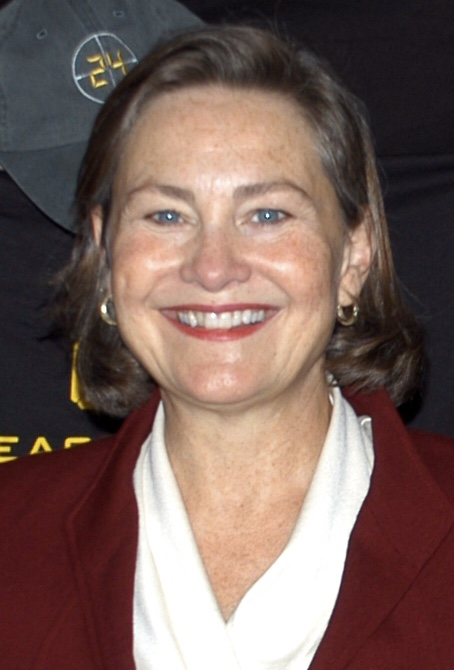
Cherry Jones twice for The Handmaid's Tale (2019) and Succession (2020).

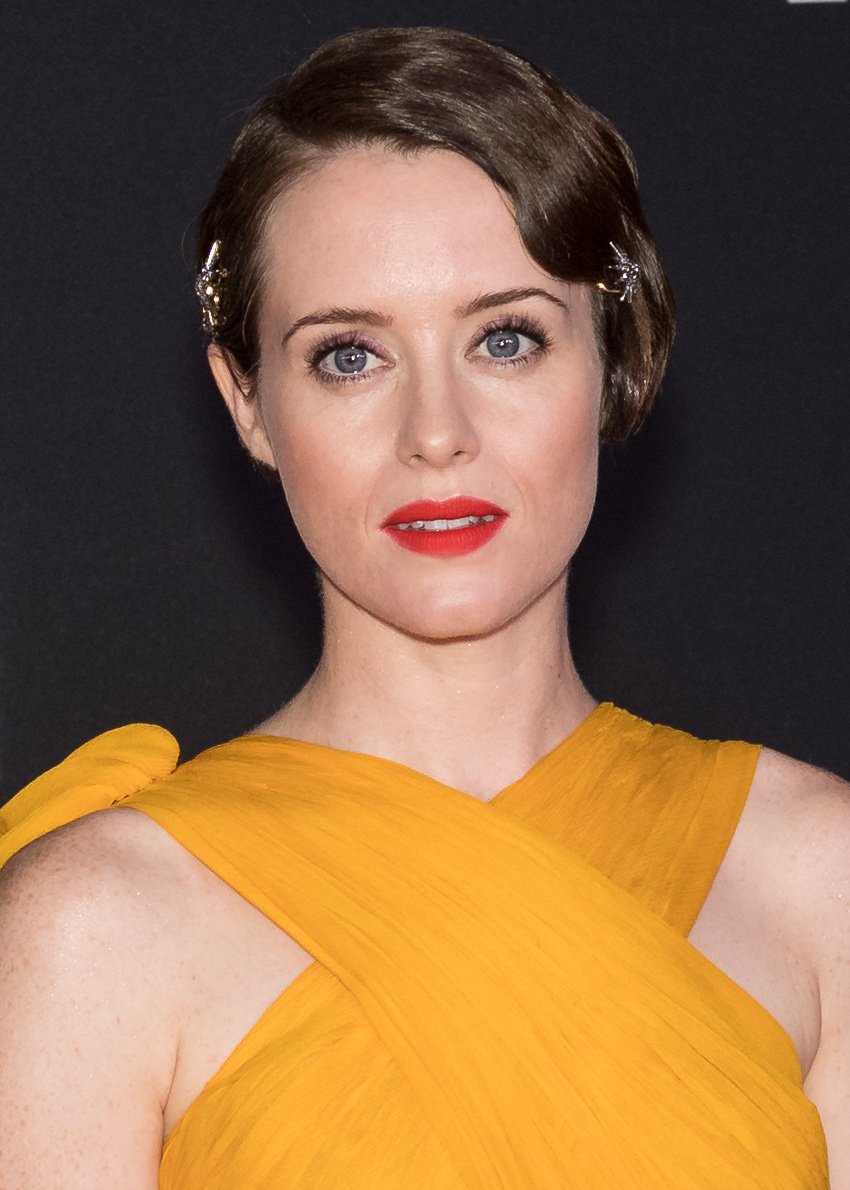
Claire Foy won The Crown (2021).

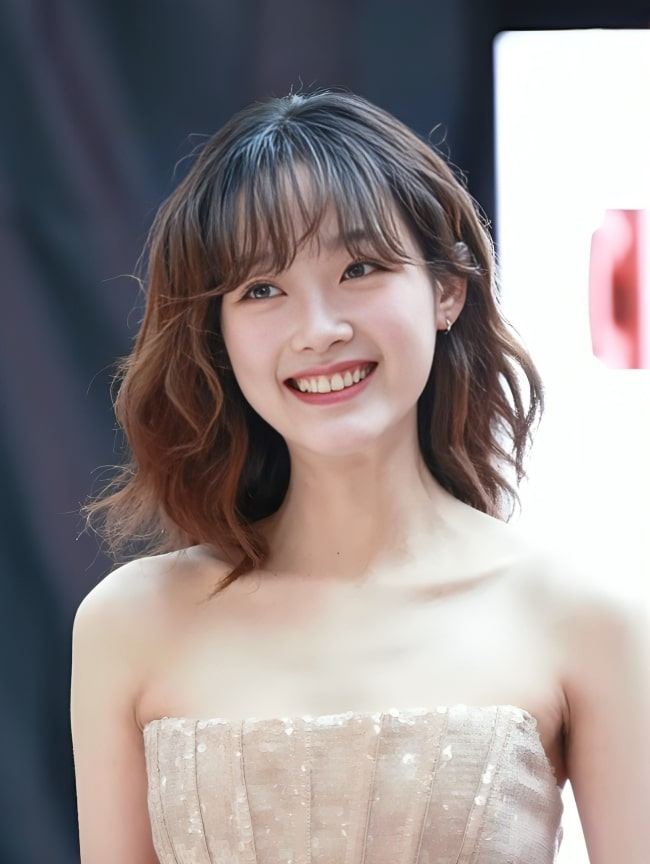
Lee Yoo-mi won for Squid Game (2022).

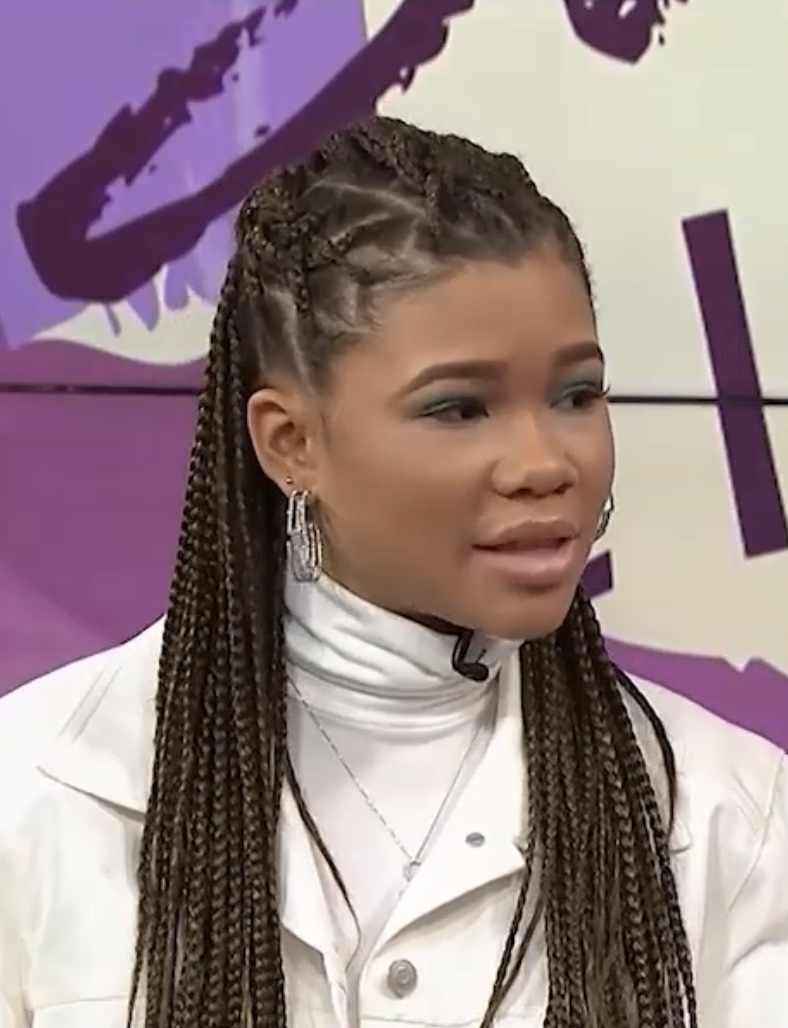
Storm Reid won for The Last of Us (2023).

=== 1970s ===
Year	Actress	Program	Role	Submitted episode(s)	Network
1975 (27th)
1975 (27th)	Zohra Lampert	Kojak	Marina Sheldon	"Queen of the Gypsies"	CBS
1975 (27th)	Cloris Leachman	The Mary Tyler Moore Show	Phyllis Lindstrom	"Phyllis Whips Inflation"	CBS
1975 (27th)	Shelley Winters	McCloud	Thelma	"The Barefoot Girls of Bleaker Street"	NBC
1976 (28th)
1976 (28th)	Outstanding Lead Actress for a Single Appearance in a Comedy or Drama Series				
1976 (28th)	Kathryn Walker	The Adams Chronicles	Abigail Adams	"John Adams, Lawyer"	PBS
1976 (28th)	Helen Hayes	Hawaii Five-O	Aunt Clara	"Retire In Sunny Hawaii... Forever"	CBS
1976 (28th)	Sheree North	Marcus Welby, M.D.	June Monica	"How Do You Know What Hurts Me?"	ABC
1976 (28th)	Pamela Payton-Wright	The Adams Chronicles	Louisa Catherine Adams	"John Quincy Adams, Diplomat"	PBS
1976 (28th)	Martha Raye	McMillan & Wife	Agatha	"Greed"	NBC
1976 (28th)	Outstanding Single Performance by a Supporting Actress in a Comedy or Drama Series				
1976 (28th)	Fionnula Flanagan	Rich Man, Poor Man	Clothilde	"Part II"	ABC
1976 (28th)	Kim Darby	Rich Man, Poor Man	Virginia Calderwood	"Part II"	ABC
1976 (28th)	Ruth Gordon	Rhoda	Carlton's Mother	"Kiss Your Epaulets Goodbye"	CBS
1976 (28th)	Eileen Heckart	The Mary Tyler Moore Show	Flo Meredith	"Mary's Aunt"	CBS
1976 (28th)	Kay Lenz	Rich Man, Poor Man	Kate Jordache	"Part VIII"	ABC
1977 (29th)
1977 (29th)	Outstanding Lead Actress for a Single Appearance in a Comedy or Drama Series				
1977 (29th)	Beulah Bondi	The Waltons	Aunt Martha Corinne Walton	"The Pony Cart"	CBS
1977 (29th)	Susan Blakely	Rich Man, Poor Man Book II	Julie Prescott	"Chapter 1"	ABC
1977 (29th)	Madge Sinclair	Roots	Bell Reynolds	"Part IV"	ABC
1977 (29th)	Leslie Uggams	Roots	Kizzy Reynolds	"Part VI"	ABC
1977 (29th)	Jessica Walter	The Streets of San Francisco	Maggie Jarris / Mrs. Reston / Mrs. McCluskey	"Till Death Do Us Part"	ABC
1977 (29th)	Outstanding Single Performance by a Supporting Actress in a Comedy or Drama Series				
1977 (29th)	Olivia Cole	Roots	Mathilda	"Part VIII"	ABC
1977 (29th)	Sandy Duncan	Roots	Missy Anne Reynolds	"Part V"	ABC
1977 (29th)	Eileen Heckart	The Mary Tyler Moore Show	Flo Meredith	"Lou Proposes"	CBS
1977 (29th)	Cicely Tyson	Roots	Binta	"Part I"	ABC
1977 (29th)	Nancy Walker	Rhoda	Ida Morgenstern	"The Separation"	CBS
1978 (30th)
1978 (30th)	Outstanding Lead Actress for a Single Appearance in a Comedy or Drama Series				
1978 (30th)	Rita Moreno	The Rockford Files	Rita Capkovic	"The Paper Palace"	NBC
1978 (30th)	Patty Duke	Having Babies III	Leslee Wexler	—N/a	ABC
1978 (30th)	Kate Jackson	Jamie at 16	Robin	"Pilot"	NBC
1978 (30th)	Jayne Meadows	Meeting of Minds	Florence Nightingale	"Luther, Voltaire, Plato, Nightingale"	PBS
1978 (30th)	Irene Tedrow	Jamie at 16	Miss Jordan	"Ducks"	NBC
1978 (30th)	Outstanding Single Performance by a Supporting Actress in a Comedy or Drama Series				
1978 (30th)	Blanche Baker	Holocaust	Anna Weiss	"Part I"	NBC
1978 (30th)	Ellen Corby	The Waltons	Esther Walton	"Grandma Comes Home"	CBS
1978 (30th)	Jeanette Nolan	The Awakening Land	Granny McWhirter	"Part I"	NBC
1978 (30th)	Beulah Quo	Meeting of Minds	Empress Tz'u-hsi	"Douglass, Tz'u-Hsi, Beccaria, De Sade"	PBS
1978 (30th)	Beatrice Straight	The Dain Curse	Alice Dain Leggett	"Part 1"	CBS

=== 1980s ===
Year	Actress	Program	Role	Submitted episode(s)	Network
Outstanding Guest Performer in a Drama Series
1986 (38th)
1986 (38th)	John Lithgow	Amazing Stories	John Walters	"The Doll"	NBC
1986 (38th)	Whoopi Goldberg	Moonlighting	Camille	"Camille"	ABC
1986 (38th)	Edward Herrmann	St. Elsewhere	Father Joseph McCabe	"Time Heals"	NBC
1986 (38th)	Peggy McCay	Cagney & Lacey	Mrs. Carruthers	"Mothers and Sons"	CBS
1986 (38th)	James Stacy	Cagney & Lacey	Ted Peters	"The Gimp"	CBS
1987 (39th)
1987 (39th)	Alfre Woodard	L.A. Law	Adrianne Moore	"Pilot"	NBC
1987 (39th)	Steve Allen	St. Elsewhere	Lech Osoranski	"Visiting Daze"	NBC
1987 (39th)	Jeanne Cooper	L.A. Law	Gladys Becker	"Fry Me to the Moon"	NBC
1987 (39th)	Edward Herrmann	St. Elsewhere	Father Joseph McCabe	"Where There's Hope, There's Crosby"	NBC
1987 (39th)	Jayne Meadows	St. Elsewhere	Olga Osoranski	"Visiting Daze"	NBC
1988 (40th)
1988 (40th)	Shirley Knight	Thirtysomething	Ruth Murdock	"The Parents Are Coming"	ABC
1988 (40th)	Imogene Coca	Moonlighting	Clara DiPesto	"Los Dos DiPietos"	ABC
1988 (40th)	Lainie Kazan	St. Elsewhere	Frieda Fiscus	"The Abby Singer Show"	NBC
1988 (40th)	Gwen Verdon	Magnum, P.I.	Catherine Peters	"Infinity And Jelly Doughnuts"	CBS
1988 (40th)	Alfre Woodard	St. Elsewhere	Dr. Roxanne Turner	"The Abby Singer Show"	NBC
Outstanding Guest Actress in a Drama Series
1989 (41st)
1989 (41st)	Kay Lenz	Midnight Caller	Tina Cassidy	"After It Happened"	NBC
1989 (41st)	Shirley Knight	The Equalizer	Kay	"Time Present, Time Past"	CBS
1989 (41st)	Jean Simmons	Murder, She Wrote	Eudora McVeigh	"Mirror, Mirror on the Wall: Part 1"	CBS
1989 (41st)	Maureen Stapleton	B.L. Stryker	Auntie Sue	"Auntie Sue"	ABC
1989 (41st)	Chloe Webb	China Beach	Laurette Barber	"Chao Ong"	ABC
1989 (41st)	Teresa Wright	Dolphin Cove	Nina Rothman	"The Elders"	CBS

=== 1990s ===
Year	Actress	Program	Role	Submitted episode(s)	Network
1990 (42nd)
1990 (42nd)	Viveca Lindfors	Life Goes On	Mrs. Doubcha	"Save the Last Dance for Me"	ABC
1990 (42nd)	Ruby Dee	China Beach	Ruby	"Skylark"	ABC
1990 (42nd)	Colleen Dewhurst	Road to Avonlea	Marilla Cuthbert	"The Quarantine at Alexander Abraham's"	Disney
1990 (42nd)	Shirley Knight	Thirtysomething	Ruth Murdoch	"Arizona"	ABC
1990 (42nd)	Kay Lenz	Midnight Caller	Tina Cassidy	"Someone to Love"	NBC
1991 (43rd)
1991 (43rd)	Peggy McCay	The Trials of Rosie O'Neill	Irene Hayes	"State of Mind"	CBS
1991 (43rd)	Eileen Brennan	Thirtysomething	Margaret Weston	"Sifting The Ashes"	ABC
1991 (43rd)	Colleen Dewhurst	Road to Avonlea	Marilla Cuthbert	"The Materializing of Duncan McTavish"	Disney
1991 (43rd)	Penny Fuller	China Beach	Margaret Mary McMurphy	"Fever"	ABC
1992 (44th)	Valerie Mahaffey (Note: Valerie Mahaffey won in the category of Outstanding Supporting Actress in a Drama Series for her guest appearance on Northern Exposure.)	Northern Exposure	Eve	"The Bumpy Road to Love"	CBS
1992 (44th)	Barbara Barrie (Note: Barbara Barrie was nominated in the category of Outstanding Supporting Actress in a Drama Series for her guest appearance on Law & Order.)	Law & Order	Mrs. Bream	"Vengeance"	NBC
1992 (44th)	Shirley Knight (Note: Shirley Knight was nominated in the category of Outstanding Lead Actress in a Drama Series for her guest appearance on Law & Order, but lost to Dana Delaney, who won for her role on China Beach.)	Law & Order	Melanie Currants	"The Wages of Love"	NBC
1992 (44th)	Kate Nelligan (Note: Kate Nelligan was nominated in the category of Outstanding Lead Actress in a Drama Series for her guest appearance on Road to Avonlea, but lost to Dana Delaney, who won for her role on China Beach.)	Road to Avonlea	Sydney Carver	"After the Honeymoon"	Disney Channel
1993 (45th)
1993 (45th)	Elaine Stritch	Law & Order	Lanie Stieglitz	"Point of View"	NBC
1993 (45th)	Bibi Besch	Northern Exposure	Jane O'Connell	"Grosse Pointe 48230"	CBS
1993 (45th)	Rosanna Carter	I'll Fly Away	Eulalia Jefferson	"What's in a Name"	NBC
1993 (45th)	Diane Ladd	Dr. Quinn, Medicine Woman	Charlotte Cooper	"Pilot"	CBS
1993 (45th)	Gwen Verdon	Homicide: Life on the Street	Jessie Doohen	"A Ghost of a Chance"	NBC
1994 (46th)
1994 (46th)	Faye Dunaway	Columbo: It's All in the Game	Lauren Staton	"It's All in the Game"	ABC
1994 (46th)	Bonnie Bedelia	Fallen Angels	Sally Creighton	"The Quiet Room"	Showtime
1994 (46th)	Stockard Channing	Road to Avonlea	Viola Elliott	"The Minister's Wife"	Disney
1994 (46th)	Laura Dern	Fallen Angels	Annie Ainsley	"Murder, Obliquely"	Showtime
1994 (46th)	Penny Fuller	NYPD Blue	Roberta Taub	"Serge the Consierge"	ABC
1994 (46th)	Marlee Matlin	Picket Fences	Laurie Bey	"Dancing Bandit"	CBS
1995 (47th)
1995 (47th)	Shirley Knight	NYPD Blue	Agnes Cantwell	"Large Mouth Bass"	ABC
1995 (47th)	Amy Brenneman	NYPD Blue	Janice Licalsi	"For Whom the Skell Tolls"	ABC
1995 (47th)	Rosemary Clooney	ER	Madame X / Mary Cavanaugh	"Going Home"	NBC
1995 (47th)	Colleen Flynn	ER	Jodi O'Brien	"Love's Labor Lost"	NBC
1995 (47th)	CCH Pounder	The X-Files	Agent Lucy Kazdin	"Duane Barry"	Fox
1996 (48th)
1996 (48th)	Amanda Plummer	The Outer Limits	Dr. Theresa Givens	"A Stitch in Time"	Showtime
1996 (48th)	Louise Fletcher	Picket Fences	Christine Bey	"Bye Bye, Bey Bey"	CBS
1996 (48th)	Penny Fuller	ER	Mrs. Constantine	"Welcome Back, Carter!"	NBC
1996 (48th)	Carol Kane	Chicago Hope	Marguerite Birch	"Stand"	CBS
1996 (48th)	Maureen Stapleton	Road to Avonlea	Maggie MacPhee	"What a Tangled Web We Weave"	Disney
1996 (48th)	Lily Tomlin	Homicide: Life on the Street	Rose Halligan	"The Hat"	NBC
1997 (49th)
1997 (49th)	Dianne Wiest	Road to Avonlea	Lillian Hepworth	"Woman of Importance"	Disney
1997 (49th)	Veronica Cartwright	ER	Norma Houston	"Who's Appy Now?"	NBC
1997 (49th)	Diane Ladd	Touched by an Angel	Carolyn Sellers	"An Angel By Any Other Name"	CBS
1997 (49th)	Anne Meara	Homicide: Life on the Street	Donna DiGrazi	"Hostage, Part 2"	NBC
1997 (49th)	Isabella Rossellini	Chicago Hope	Prof. Marina Giannini	"Mother, May I"	CBS
1998 (50th)
1998 (50th)	Cloris Leachman	Promised Land	Aunt Mooster	"Mooster's Revenge"	CBS
1998 (50th)	Veronica Cartwright	The X-Files	Cassandra Spender	"Patient X"	Fox
1998 (50th)	Swoosie Kurtz	ER	Tina Marie Chambliss	"Suffer the Little Children"	NBC
1998 (50th)	Lili Taylor	The X-Files	Marty Glenn	"Mind's Eye"	Fox
1998 (50th)	Alfre Woodard	Homicide: Life on the Street	Dr. Roxanne Turner	"Mercy"	NBC
1999 (51st)
1999 (51st)	Debra Monk	NYPD Blue	Katie Sipowicz	"Hearts and Souls"	ABC
1999 (51st)	Veronica Cartwright	The X-Files	Cassandra Spender	"Two Fathers"	Fox
1999 (51st)	Patty Duke	Touched by an Angel	Nancy Williams	"I Do"	CBS
1999 (51st)	Julia Roberts	Law & Order	Katrina Ludlow	"Empire"	NBC
1999 (51st)	Marion Ross	Touched by an Angel	Emma	"The Wind Beneath My Wings"	CBS

=== 2000s ===
Year	Actress	Program	Role	Network
2000 (52nd)
2000 (52nd)	Beah Richards	The Practice	Gertrude Turner	ABC
2000 (52nd)	Jane Alexander	Law & Order	Regina Mulroney	NBC
2000 (52nd)	Jane Alexander	Law & Order: Special Victims Unit	Regina Mulroney	NBC
2000 (52nd)	Kathy Baker	Touched by an Angel	Ellen	CBS
2000 (52nd)	Marlee Matlin	The Practice	Sally Berg	ABC
2000 (52nd)	Tracy Pollan	Law & Order: Special Victims Unit	Harper Anderson	NBC
2001 (53rd)
2001 (53rd)	Sally Field	ER	Maggie Wyczenski	NBC
2001 (53rd)	Kathy Baker	Boston Public	Meredith Peters	Fox
2001 (53rd)	Dana Delany	Family Law	Mary Sullivan	CBS
2001 (53rd)	Annabella Sciorra	The Sopranos	Gloria Trillo	HBO
2001 (53rd)	Jean Smart	The District	Sherry Regan	CBS
2002 (54th)
2002 (54th)	Patricia Clarkson	Six Feet Under	Sarah O'Connor	HBO
2002 (54th)	Illeana Douglas	Six Feet Under	Angela	HBO
2002 (54th)	Mary McDonnell	ER	Eleanor Carter	NBC
2002 (54th)	Martha Plimpton	Law & Order: Special Victims Unit	Claire Rinato	NBC
2002 (54th)	Lili Taylor	Six Feet Under	Lisa Kimmel Fisher	HBO
2003 (55th)
2003 (55th)	Alfre Woodard	The Practice	Denise Freeman	ABC
2003 (55th)	Barbara Barrie	Law & Order: Special Victims Unit	Paula Haggerty	NBC
2003 (55th)	Kathy Bates	Six Feet Under	Bettina	HBO
2003 (55th)	Farrah Fawcett	The Guardian	Mary Gressler	CBS
2003 (55th)	Tovah Feldshuh	Law & Order	Danielle Melnick	NBC
2003 (55th)	Sally Field	ER	Maggie Wyczenski	NBC
2004 (56th)
2004 (56th)	Sharon Stone	The Practice	Sheila Carlisle	ABC
2004 (56th)	Louise Fletcher	Joan of Arcadia	Eva	CBS
2004 (56th)	Marlee Matlin	Law & Order: Special Victims Unit	Dr. Amy Solwey	NBC
2004 (56th)	Mare Winningham	Law & Order: Special Victims Unit	Sandra Blaine	NBC
2004 (56th)	Betty White	The Practice	Catherine Piper	ABC
2005 (57th)
2005 (57th)	Amanda Plummer	Law & Order: Special Victims Unit	Miranda Cole	NBC
2005 (57th)	Jill Clayburgh	Nip/Tuck	Bobbi Broderick	FX
2005 (57th)	Swoosie Kurtz	Huff	Madeleine Sullivan	Showtime
2005 (57th)	Angela Lansbury	Law & Order: Special Victims Unit	Eleanor Duvall	NBC
2005 (57th)	Angela Lansbury	Law & Order: Trial by Jury	Eleanor Duvall	NBC
2005 (57th)	Cloris Leachman	Joan of Arcadia	Aunt Olive	CBS
2006 (58th)
2006 (58th)	Patricia Clarkson	Six Feet Under	Sarah O'Connor	HBO
2006 (58th)	Kate Burton	Grey's Anatomy	Ellis Grey	ABC
2006 (58th)	Joanna Cassidy	Six Feet Under	Margaret Chenowith	HBO
2006 (58th)	Swoosie Kurtz	Huff	Madeleine Sullivan	Showtime
2006 (58th)	Christina Ricci	Grey's Anatomy	Hannah Davies	ABC
2007 (59th)
2007 (59th)	Leslie Caron	Law & Order: Special Victims Unit	Lorraine Delmas	NBC
2007 (59th)	Kate Burton	Grey's Anatomy	Ellis Grey	ABC
2007 (59th)	Marcia Gay Harden	Law & Order: Special Victims Unit	Dana Lewis	NBC
2007 (59th)	Elizabeth Reaser	Grey's Anatomy	Rebecca Pope / Ava	ABC
2007 (59th)	Jean Smart	24	Martha Logan	Fox
2008 (60th)
2008 (60th)	Cynthia Nixon	Law & Order: Special Victims Unit	Janis Donovan	NBC
2008 (60th)	Ellen Burstyn	Big Love	Nancy Davis Dutton	HBO
2008 (60th)	Diahann Carroll	Grey's Anatomy	Jane Burke	ABC
2008 (60th)	Sharon Gless	Nip/Tuck	Colleen Rose	FX
2008 (60th)	Anjelica Huston	Medium	Cynthia Keener	NBC
2009 (61st)
2009 (61st)	Ellen Burstyn	Law & Order: Special Victims Unit	Bernie Stabler	NBC
2009 (61st)	Brenda Blethyn	Law & Order: Special Victims Unit	Linnie Malcolm / Caroline Cantwell	NBC
2009 (61st)	Carol Burnett	Law & Order: Special Victims Unit	Bridget "Birdie" Sulloway	NBC
2009 (61st)	Sharon Lawrence	Grey's Anatomy	Robbie Stevens	ABC
2009 (61st)	CCH Pounder	The No. 1 Ladies' Detective Agency	Andrea Curtin	HBO

=== 2010s ===
Year	Actress	Program	Role	Submitted episode(s)	Network
2010 (62nd)
2010 (62nd)	Ann-Margret	Law & Order: Special Victims Unit	Rita Wills	"Bedtime"	NBC
2010 (62nd)	Shirley Jones	The Cleaner	Lola Zellman	"Does Everybody Have a Drink?"	A&E
2010 (62nd)	Elizabeth Mitchell	Lost	Dr. Juliet Burke	"The End"	ABC
2010 (62nd)	Mary Kay Place	Big Love	Adaleen Grant	"The Mighty and Strong"	HBO
2010 (62nd)	Sissy Spacek	Big Love	Marilyn Densham	"End of Days"	HBO
2010 (62nd)	Lily Tomlin	Damages	Marilyn Tobin	"Your Secrets Are Safe"	FX
2011 (63rd)
2011 (63rd)	Loretta Devine	Grey's Anatomy	Adele Webber	"This Is How We Do It"	ABC
2011 (63rd)	Cara Buono	Mad Men	Dr. Faye Miller	"Chinese Wall"	AMC
2011 (63rd)	Joan Cusack	Shameless	Sheila Jackson	"Frank Gallagher: Loving Husband, Devoted Father"	Showtime
2011 (63rd)	Randee Heller	Mad Men	Ida Blankenship	"The Beautiful Girls"	AMC
2011 (63rd)	Mary McDonnell	The Closer	Sharon Raydor	"Help Wanted"	TNT
2011 (63rd)	Julia Stiles	Dexter	Lumen Pierce	"In the Beginning"	Showtime
2011 (63rd)	Alfre Woodard	True Blood	Ruby Jean Reynolds	"Night of the Sun"	HBO
2012 (64th)
2012 (64th)	Martha Plimpton	The Good Wife	Patti Nyholm	"The Dream Team"	CBS
2012 (64th)	Joan Cusack	Shameless	Sheila Jackson	"Can I Have a Mother"	Showtime
2012 (64th)	Loretta Devine	Grey's Anatomy	Adele Webber	"If Only You Were Lonely"	ABC
2012 (64th)	Julia Ormond	Mad Men	Marie Calvet	"The Phantom"	AMC
2012 (64th)	Jean Smart	Harry's Law	Roseanna Remmick	"The Rematch"	NBC
2012 (64th)	Uma Thurman	Smash	Rebecca Duvall	"Tech"	NBC
2013 (65th)
2013 (65th)	Carrie Preston	The Good Wife	Elsbeth Tascioni	"Je Ne Sais What?"	CBS
2013 (65th)	Linda Cardellini	Mad Men	Sylvia Rosen	"Man with a Plan"	AMC
2013 (65th)	Joan Cusack	Shameless	Sheila Jackson	"A Long Way From Home"	Showtime
2013 (65th)	Jane Fonda	The Newsroom	Leona Lansing	"The 112th Congress"	HBO
2013 (65th)	Margo Martindale	The Americans	Claudia	"The Colonel"	FX
2013 (65th)	Diana Rigg	Game of Thrones	Lady Olenna Tyrell	"And Now His Watch Is Ended"	HBO
2014 (66th)
2014 (66th)	Allison Janney	Masters of Sex	Margaret Scully	"Brave New World"	Showtime
2014 (66th)	Kate Burton	Scandal	Vice President Sally Langston	"A Door Marked Exit"	ABC
2014 (66th)	Jane Fonda	The Newsroom	Leona Lansing	"Red Team III"	HBO
2014 (66th)	Kate Mara	House of Cards	Zoe Barnes	"Chapter 14"	Netflix
2014 (66th)	Margo Martindale	The Americans	Claudia	"Behind the Red Door"	FX
2014 (66th)	Diana Rigg	Game of Thrones	Lady Olenna Tyrell	"The Lion and the Rose"	HBO
2015 (67th)
2015 (67th)	Margo Martindale	The Americans	Claudia	"I Am Abassin Zadran"	FX
2015 (67th)	Khandi Alexander	Scandal	Maya Pope	"Where the Sun Don't Shine"	ABC
2015 (67th)	Rachel Brosnahan	House of Cards	Rachel Posner	"Chapter 39"	Netflix
2015 (67th)	Allison Janney	Masters of Sex	Margaret Scully	"Parallax"	Showtime
2015 (67th)	Diana Rigg	Game of Thrones	Lady Olenna Tyrell	"The Gift"	HBO
2015 (67th)	Cicely Tyson	How to Get Away with Murder	Ophelia Harkness	"Mama's Here Now"	ABC
2016 (68th)
2016 (68th)	Margo Martindale	The Americans	Claudia	"The Magic of David Copperfield V: The Statue of Liberty Disappears"	FX
2016 (68th)	Ellen Burstyn	House of Cards	Elizabeth Hale	"Chapter 41"	Netflix
2016 (68th)	Allison Janney	Masters of Sex	Margaret Scully	"Matters of Gravity"	Showtime
2016 (68th)	Laurie Metcalf	Horace and Pete	Sarah Marsh	"Episode 3"	louisck.net
2016 (68th)	Molly Parker	House of Cards	Jackie Sharp	"Chapter 45"	Netflix
2016 (68th)	Carrie Preston	The Good Wife	Elsbeth Tascioni	"Targets"	CBS
2017 (69th)	Alexis Bledel	The Handmaid's Tale	Emily Malek / Ofglen	"Late"	Hulu
2017 (69th)	Laverne Cox	Orange Is the New Black	Sophia Burset	"Doctor Psycho"	Netflix
2017 (69th)	Ann Dowd	The Leftovers	Patti Levin	"The Most Powerful Man in the World (and His Identical Twin Brother)"	HBO
2017 (69th)	Shannon Purser	Stranger Things	Barb Holland	"Chapter Three: Holly, Jolly"	Netflix
2017 (69th)	Cicely Tyson	How to Get Away with Murder	Ophelia Harkness	"Go Cry Somewhere Else"	ABC
2017 (69th)	Alison Wright	The Americans	Martha Hanson	"The Soviet Division"	FX
2018 (70th)	Samira Wiley	The Handmaid's Tale	Moira Strand	"After"	Hulu
2018 (70th)	Viola Davis	Scandal	Annalise Keating	"Allow Me to Reintroduce Myself"	ABC
2018 (70th)	Kelly Jenrette	The Handmaid's Tale	Annie	"Other Women"	Hulu
2018 (70th)	Cherry Jones	The Handmaid's Tale	Holly Maddox	"Baggage"	Hulu
2018 (70th)	Diana Rigg	Game of Thrones	Lady Olenna Tyrell	"The Queen's Justice"	HBO
2018 (70th)	Cicely Tyson	How to Get Away with Murder	Ophelia Harkness	"I'm Going Away"	ABC
2019 (71st)
2019 (71st)	Cherry Jones	The Handmaid's Tale	Holly Maddox	"Holly"	Hulu
2019 (71st)	Laverne Cox	Orange Is the New Black	Sophia Burset	"Well This Took a Dark Turn"	Netflix
2019 (71st)	Jessica Lange	American Horror Story: Apocalypse	Constance Langdon	"Return to Murder House"	FX
2019 (71st)	Phylicia Rashad	This Is Us	Carol Clarke	"Our Little Island Girl"	NBC
2019 (71st)	Cicely Tyson	How to Get Away with Murder	Ophelia Harkness	"Where Are Your Parents?"	ABC
2019 (71st)	Carice van Houten	Game of Thrones	Melisandre of Asshai	"The Long Night"	HBO

=== 2020s ===
Year	Actor	Program	Role	Episode	Network
2020 (72nd)
2020 (72nd)	Cherry Jones	Succession	Nan Pierce	"Tern Haven"	HBO
2020 (72nd)	Alexis Bledel	The Handmaid's Tale	Emily Malek / Ofglen	"God Bless the Child"	Hulu
2020 (72nd)	Laverne Cox	Orange Is the New Black	Sophia Burset	"God Bless America"	Netflix
2020 (72nd)	Phylicia Rashad	This Is Us	Carol Clarke	"Flip a Coin"	NBC
2020 (72nd)	Cicely Tyson	How to Get Away with Murder	Ophelia Harkness	"Stay"	ABC
2020 (72nd)	Harriet Walter	Succession	Caroline Collingwood	"Return"	HBO
2021 (73rd)
2021 (73rd)	Claire Foy	The Crown	Princess Elizabeth	"48:1"	Netflix
2021 (73rd)	Alexis Bledel	The Handmaid's Tale	Emily Malek / Ofglen	"Testimony"	Hulu
2021 (73rd)	Mckenna Grace	The Handmaid's Tale	Esther Keyes	"Pigs"	Hulu
2021 (73rd)	Sophie Okonedo	Ratched	Charlotte Wells	"The Dance"	Netflix
2021 (73rd)	Phylicia Rashad	This Is Us	Carol Clarke	"I've Got This"	NBC
2022 (74th)
2022 (74th)	Lee Yoo-mi	Squid Game	Ji-Yeong	"Gganbu"	Netflix
2022 (74th)	Hope Davis	Succession	Sandi Furness	"Retired Janitors of Idaho"	HBO
2022 (74th)	Marcia Gay Harden	The Morning Show	Maggie Brener	"Testimony"	Apple TV+
2022 (74th)	Martha Kelly	Euphoria	Laurie	"Stand Still Like the Hummingbird"	HBO
2022 (74th)	Sanaa Lathan	Succession	Lisa Arthur	"What It Takes"	HBO
2022 (74th)	Harriet Walter	Succession	Caroline Collingwood	"Chiantishire"	HBO
2023 (75th)
2023 (75th)	Storm Reid	The Last of Us	Riley Abel	"Left Behind"	HBO
2023 (75th)	Hiam Abbass	Succession	Marcia Roy	"Honeymoon States"	HBO
2023 (75th)	Cherry Jones	Succession	Nan Pierce	"The Munsters"	HBO
2023 (75th)	Melanie Lynskey	The Last of Us	Kathleen Coghlan	"Endure and Survive"	HBO
2023 (75th)	Anna Torv	The Last of Us	Tess Servopoulos	"Infected"	HBO
2023 (75th)	Harriet Walter	Succession	Caroline Collingwood	"Church and State"	HBO
2024 (76th)
2024 (76th)	Michaela Coel	Mr. & Mrs. Smith	Bev	"Infidelity"	Prime Video
2024 (76th)	Claire Foy	The Crown	Elizabeth II	"Sleep, Dearie Sleep"	Netflix
2024 (76th)	Marcia Gay Harden	The Morning Show	Maggie Brener	"Update Your Priors"	Apple TV+
2024 (76th)	Sarah Paulson	Mr. & Mrs. Smith	Therapist	"Couples Therapy (Naked & Afraid)"	Prime Video
2024 (76th)	Parker Posey	Mr. & Mrs. Smith	Other Jane	"Double Date"	Prime Video
2025 (77th)
2025 (77th)	Merritt Wever	Severance	Gretchen George	"Who Is Alive?"	Apple TV+
2025 (77th)	Jane Alexander	Severance	Sissy Cobel	"Sweet Vitriol"	Apple TV+
2025 (77th)	Gwendoline Christie	Severance	Lorne	"Cold Harbor"	Apple TV+
2025 (77th)	Kaitlyn Dever	The Last of Us	Abby	"Through the Valley"	HBO
2025 (77th)	Cherry Jones	The Handmaid's Tale	Holly	"Exile"	Hulu
2025 (77th)	Catherine O'Hara	The Last of Us	Gail	"Future Days"	HBO
2026 (78th)
2026 (78th)	Shailene Woodley	Paradise	Annie Clay	"Graceland"	Hulu
2026 (78th)	Brittany Allen	The Pitt	Roxie Hamler	"3:00 P.M."	HBO Max
2026 (78th)	Tal Anderson	The Pitt	Becca King	"5:00 P.M."	HBO Max
2026 (78th)	Tina Ivlev	The Pitt	Ilana Miller	"1:00 P.M."	HBO Max
2026 (78th)	Miriam Shor	Pluribus	Helen	"We Is Us"	Apple TV
2026 (78th)	Merritt Wever	The Gilded Age	Monica O'Brien	"Marriage Is a Gamble"	HBO

== Performers with multiple wins ==
2 wins

- Patricia Clarkson
- Cherry Jones (consecutive)
- Shirley Knight
- Margo Martindale (consecutive)
- Amanda Plummer
- Alfre Woodard

== Programs with multiple wins ==
5 wins

- Law & Order: Special Victims Unit (4 consecutive)

3 awards

- The Handmaid's Tale (consecutive)
- The Practice (2 consecutive)

2 wins

- The Americans (consecutive)
- The Good Wife (consecutive)
- NYPD Blue
- Six Feet Under

== Performers with multiple nominations ==
5 nominations

- Cherry Jones
- Cicely Tyson
- Alfre Woodard

4 nominations

- Shirley Knight
- Margo Martindale
- Diana Rigg

3 nominations

- Alexis Bledel
- Ellen Burstyn
- Kate Burton
- Veronica Cartwright
- Laverne Cox
- Joan Cusack
- Penny Fuller
- Marcia Gay Harden
- Allison Janney
- Swoosie Kurtz
- Cloris Leachman
- Kay Lenz
- Marlee Matlin
- Phylicia Rashad
- Jean Smart
- Harriet Walter

2 nominations

- Jane Alexander
- Kathy Baker
- Patricia Clarkson
- Colleen Dewhurst
- Loretta Devine
- Patty Duke
- Sally Field
- Louise Fletcher
- Jane Fonda
- Claire Foy
- Eileen Heckart
- Diane Ladd
- Mary McDonnell
- Jayne Meadows
- Martha Plimpton
- Amanda Plummer
- CCH Pounder
- Carrie Preston
- Lili Taylor
- Lily Tomlin
- Merritt Wever

== Programs with multiple nominations ==
14 nominations

- Law & Order: Special Victims Unit

9 nominations

- Grey's Anatomy
- The Handmaid's Tale

8 nominations

- ER
- Succession

6 nominations

- Six Feet Under
- St. Elsewhere

5 nominations

- The Americans
- Game of Thrones
- How to Get Away with Murder
- The Last of Us
- The Practice
- Road to Avonlea

4 nominations

- Homicide: Life on the Street
- House of Cards
- Law & Order
- Mad Men
- NYPD Blue
- Touched by an Angel
- The X-Files

3 nominations

- Big Love
- China Beach
- The Good Wife
- Masters of Sex
- Mr. & Mrs. Smith
- Orange Is the New Black
- The Pitt
- Scandal
- Severance
- Shameless
- thirtysomething
- This Is Us

2 nominations

- Cagney & Lacey
- Chicago Hope
- The Crown
- Fallen Angels
- Huff
- Joan of Arcadia
- L.A. Law
- Midnight Caller
- Moonlighting
- The Morning Show
- The Newsroom
- Nip/Tuck
- Picket Fences

== See also ==
- TCA Award for Individual Achievement in Drama
- Critics' Choice Television Award for Best Guest Performer in a Drama Series
- Golden Globe Award for Best Supporting Actress – Series, Miniseries, or Television Film
- Screen Actors Guild Award for Outstanding Performance by a Female Actor in a Drama Series
