= Kay Lenz =

American actress (born 1953)

- Lenz in 1974
- Born: Kay Ann Lenz; March 4, 1953 (age 73); Los Angeles, California, U.S.
- Other name: Kay Ann Kemper
- Occupation: Actress
- Years active: 1964–present
- Spouse: David Cassidy (m. 1977; div. 1983)

Kay Ann Lenz (born March 4, 1953) is an American actress. She is the recipient of a Daytime Emmy Award and a Primetime Emmy Award, as well as nominations for a Golden Globe Award and a Saturn Award.

Lenz is best known for her title role in the film Breezy (1973), for which she was nominated for a Golden Globe Award for Most Promising Newcomer – Female. She is also known for her roles in the film House (1985), as well as the television series Midnight Caller (1988–1989) and Reasonable Doubts (1991–1993). For her role in the episode "After It Happened" of Midnight Caller, she won a Primetime Emmy Award for Outstanding Guest Actress in a Drama Series. She started her career with the stage name Kay Ann Kemper, switching to Kay Lenz after her third role, a brief appearance in American Graffiti (filmed in 1972).

== Early years ==
Lenz was born in Los Angeles, California, to Ted Lenz, an actor and producer, and Kay Miller Lenz, who worked as a radio engineer and professional model. She attended Ulysses S. Grant High School. Her television debut was as a baby, held by Betty White on the Hollywood on Television program, produced by her father.

== Career ==
Lenz began working as a child actress, beginning with appearances in three episodes of This Is the Life when she was 14. She went on to appear in such television shows as The Andy Griffith Show (in the episode "Opie's Group" (1967) under the stage name Kay Ann Kemper) as well as in stage productions. She made a brief appearance billed as Kay Ann Kemper in American Graffiti (1973) as Jane, a girl at a dance. She achieved recognition for her title-role performance as the free spirit who captivates William Holden in Breezy (1973), directed by Clint Eastwood.

Lenz made guest appearances in The Streets of San Francisco, Gunsmoke, MacGyver, McCloud, Cannon, and Petrocelli, and played a lead role in the film White Line Fever (1975) before being cast in 1976 in the miniseries Rich Man, Poor Man, for which she was nominated for an Emmy Award. She reprised her role for the sequel, Rich Man, Poor Man Book II (1977). Since the 1980s, she has played guest roles in numerous television series. She appeared in Albert Brooks' short film for a Season 1 episode of Saturday Night Live.

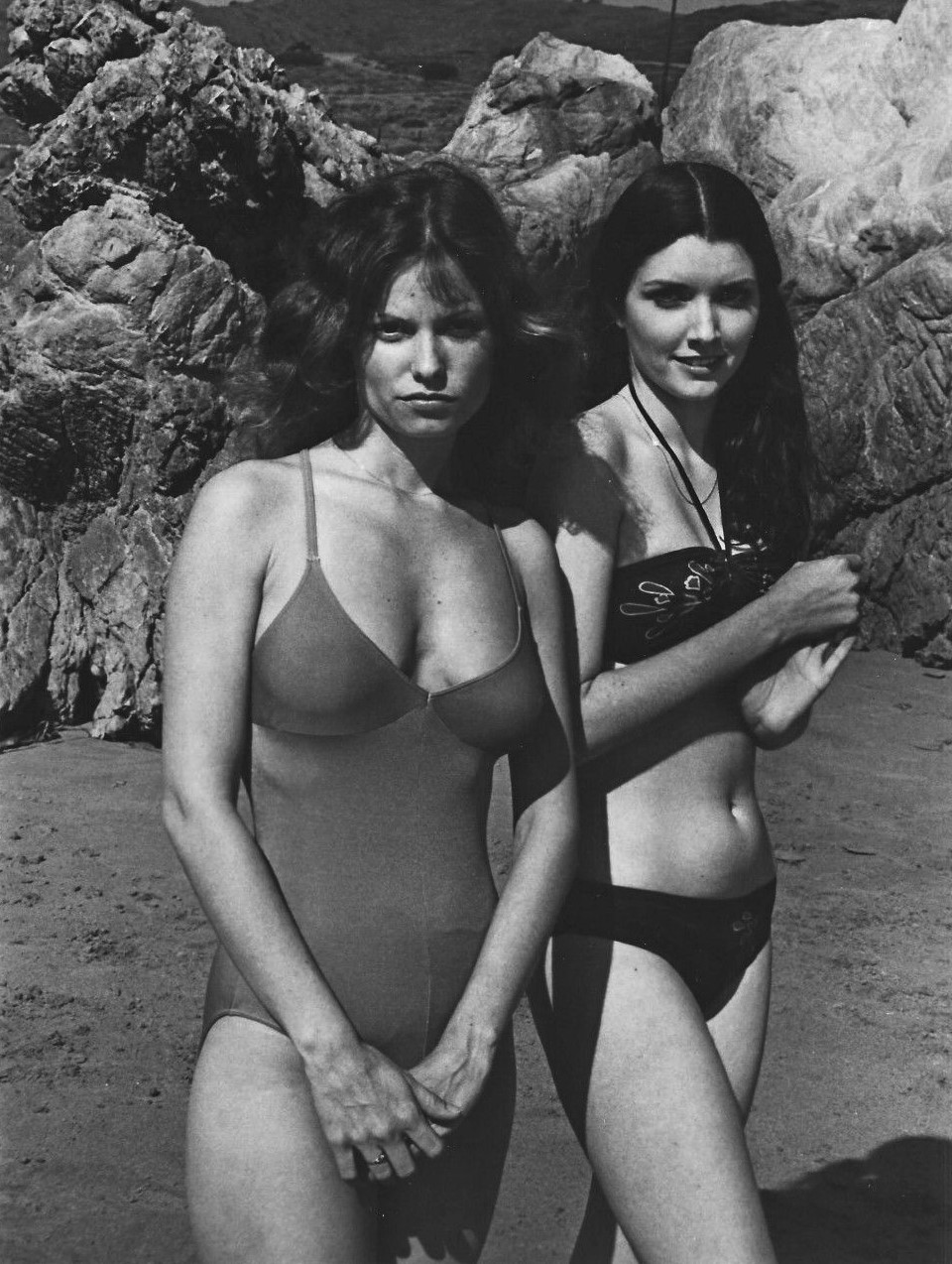
Lenz and Morgan Brittany in the television film The Initiation of Sarah (1978)

In 1984, she appeared in Rod Stewart's music video for the song "Infatuation". She won a Primetime Emmy Award in 1989 for Midnight Caller. She was also nominated for two Primetime Emmy Awards for her role as flinty lawyer Maggie Zombro in the police/legal drama Reasonable Doubts.

== Personal life ==
Lenz was the first wife of singer-actor David Cassidy. Of their April 3, 1977, wedding, Lenz says:

I wasn’t used to that state-of-stardom lifestyle... When we eloped it was on the national news. All of a sudden I was getting mail from women telling me that they had three of his children.

The couple divorced on December 28, 1983.

In November 2018, Lenz and her partner, Dr. Mark Brown, MD, lost their home in the Woolsey Fire in Malibu, California.

== Filmography ==
=== Film ===
Year	Title	Role	Notes
1973	American Graffiti	Jane	as Kay Ann Kemper
1973	Breezy	Edith Alice Breezerman	Nominated — Golden Globe Award for Most Promising Newcomer - Female
1973	Lisa, Bright and Dark	Lisa Schilling	
1975	White Line Fever	Jerri Kane Hummer	
1976	Moving Violation	Cam Johnson	
1976	The Great Scout & Cathouse Thursday	Thursday	
1978	Mean Dog Blues	Linda Ramsey	
1979	The Passage	Leah Bergson	
1981	Swan Lake	Odille	Voice role
1982	Fast-Walking	"Little" Moke	
1983	Prisoners of the Lost Universe	Carrie Madison	
1983	Trial by Terror	Karen Armstrong	
1985	House	Sandy Sinclair	Nominated — Saturn Award for Best Supporting Actress
1987	Death Wish 4: The Crackdown	Karen Sheldon	
1987	Stripped to Kill	Detective Cody Sheenan	
1988	Fear	Sharon Haden	
1989	Headhunter	Katherine Hall	
1989	Physical Evidence	Deborah Quinn	
1990	Streets	Sargent	
1991	Shakespeare's Plan 12 from Outer Space	Sebastian	
1992	Falling From Grace	P.J. Parks	
1994	Trapped in Space	Gillings	
1995	Gunfighter's Moon	Linda Yarnell	
1995	Shame II: The Secret	Ginny	Nominated — CableACE Award for Best Supporting Actress in a Movie or Miniseries
1997	A Gun, a Car, a Blonde	Peep/Madge	
1998	The Adventures of Ragtime	Detective Hill	
2003	Southside	Claire Coleman	
2013	The Secret Lives of Dorks	Mrs. Susie Gibson	
2017	The Downside of Bliss	Mary	
2019	More Beautiful Things Have Been Broken	Cassandra	
2024	Sallywood	Kathryn Corrigan	

=== Television ===
Year	Title	Role	Notes
1967	The Andy Griffith Show	Phoebe (but mistakenly credited as Joy)	Episode: "Opie's Group" (as Kay Ann Kemper)
1967	The Monroes	Maudie Buchner	Episode: "Teaching The Tigers to Purr" (as Kay Ann Kemper)
1972	Ironside	Stephanie Tucker	Episode: "Cold Hard Cash"
1972	The Weekend Nun	Audree	ABC Movie of the Week
1973	Owen Marshall, Counselor at Law	Lucy	Episode: "A Girl Named Tham"
1973	A Summer Without Boys	Ruth Hailey	ABC Movie of the Week
1973	The Streets of San Francisco	Sarah Holt	Episode: "Harem"
1974	Love Story	Sara	Episode: "Time for Love"
1974	Gunsmoke	Lettie	Episode: "The Foundling"
1974	The ABC Afternoon Playbreak	Dorie	Daytime Emmy Award for Outstanding Actress in a Daytime Drama Special for episode: "Heart in Hiding"
1974	Unwed Father	Vicky Simmons	ABC Movie of the Week
1974	Nakia	Barbara	Episode: "The Hostage"
1974	Kodiak		Episode: "Death Chase "
1974	McCloud	Eve Randall	Episode: "Barefoot Girls of Bleeker Street"
1974	Medical Center	Kitty Palumbo	Episode: "The Conspirators"
1974	The Underground Man	Sue Crandell	TV movie
1974	The F.B.I. Story: The FBI Versus Alvin Karpis, Public Enemy Number One	Shirley	TV movie
1974	Cannon	Sally	Episode: "The Avenger"
1974	The One	Shirley	TV movie
1975	Journey from Darkness	Sherry Williams	TV movie
1975	Petrocelli	Janet / Mary Wade	Episode: "Face of Evil"
1976	Rich Man, Poor Man	Kate Jordache	Nominated — Primetime Emmy Award for Outstanding Supporting Actress in a Miniseries or a Movie
1976	The Tonight Show Starring Johnny Carson	Self	1 episode
1976	Jigsaw John	Miriam Buckley	Episode: "Eclipse"
1977	Rich Man, Poor Man Book II	Kate Jordache	Miniseries
1978	How The West Was Won	Doreen	3 episodes
1978	The Initiation of Sarah	Sarah Goodwin	TV movie
1979	Good Morning America	Self	Episode dated July 24, 1979
1979	The Seeding of Sarah Burns	Sarah Burns	TV movie
1979	Sanctuary Of Fear	Carol Bain	TV pilot for unmade series, starring Barnard Hughes
1980	Escape	Barbara Chilcoate	TV movie
1980	The Hustler of Muscle Beach	Jenny O’Rourke	TV movie
1982	Insight	L.J.	Episode: "Matchpoint"
1984	Whiz Kids	Helen Langton	Episode: "Amen to Amen-Re"
1984	Hill Street Blues	Whitney Barnes	Episode: "The Other Side of Oneness"
1984–1988	Simon & Simon	Kris Caulfield/Lolita	4 episodes
1984–1987	Hotel	Gail Matthews/Mary Morowsky	2 episodes
1984	Magnum P.I.	Sally DeForest	Episode: "Let the Punishment Fit the Crime"
1984	The Fall Guy	Kim Donnelly	Episodes: "Losers Weepers" (Pts 1 and 2)
1984	Cagney & Lacey	Linda Mack	Episode: "Victimless Crime"
1984	Matt Houston	Cassie Stanley	Episode: "Stolen"
1985	Murder She Wrote	Nurse Jennie Wells	Episode: "Armed Response"
1985	Finder of Lost Loves	Ellen Ross	Episode: "Last Wish"
1985	Riptide	Brenda Malloy	Episode: "Still Goin' Steady"
1985	MacGyver	Kelly Neilson	Episode: "Last Stand"
1986	Heart of the City	Kathy Priester	2 episodes
1986	Hunter	Alicia Fiori	Episode: "Scrap Metal"
1987	Mr. Belvedere	Sharon Rogers	Season 3 Episode #18: "Kevin's Older Woman"
1987	Charles in Charge	Joan Robinson	Episode: "The Undergraduate"
1987	Houston Knights	Elizabeth	Episode: "Home Is Where the Heart Is"
1987	Starman	Dr. Katherine Bradford	Episode: "The Probe"
1987	Moonlighting	Melissa	Episode: "Come Back Little Shiksa"
1988	Midnight Caller	Tina Cassidy	3 episodes Primetime Emmy Award for Outstanding Guest Actress in a Drama Series (1989); Nominated —Primetime Emmy Award for Outstanding Guest Actress in a Drama Series (1990)
1989	Hardball	Connie Villanova	Episode: "Till Death Do Us Part"
1989	ABC Afterschool Special	Bonnie Green	Episode: "Private Affairs"
1989	Murder by Night	Karen Hicks	TV movie
1991	Reasonable Doubts	Maggie Zombro	Recurring role (season 1); main role (season 2); 32 episodes Viewers for Quality Television Award for Best Supporting Actress in a Quality Drama Series (1993); Nominated — Primetime Emmy Award for Outstanding Supporting Actress in a Drama Series (1993)
1992–1993	Wild West C.O.W.-Boys of Moo Mesa	Cowlamity Kate Cudster	Voice role
1993	An Evening at the Improv	Self-Host	Episode #12.8
1994	The Tick	American Maid	Voice role; 25 episodes
1995	Lois & Clark: The New Adventures of Superman	Constance Hunter	Episode: "Whine Whine Whine"
1996	Touched by an Angel	Rocky McCann	Episode: "The Journalist"
1997	Journey of the Heart	Marvelle	Television film
1999	Mysteries and Scandals	self	Episode about William Holden
2000	ER	Karen Palmieri	Episode: "Homecoming"
2000	The Magnificent Seven	Ella Gaines	Episode: "Obsession"
2000–2001	Cover Me	Lisa Ramone	2 episodes
2001	Once and Again	Stephanie Arlen	2 episodes
2002	Law & Order: Special Victims Unit	Linda Cavanaugh	Episode: "Guilt"
2003	The Agency	Police Interrogator	Episode: "Coventry"
2003	JAG	Judge Smith	Episode: "A Merry Little Christmas"
2007	House, M.D.	Mrs Bradberry	Episode: "Alone"
2008	NCIS	Connie Quinn Wheeler	Episode: "Silent Night"
2009	Cold Case	Hillary Rhodes	Episode: "November 22"
2010	The Closer	Mrs Tatem	Episode: "In Custody"
2011	Southland	Naomi Chester	Episode: "Fixing a Hole"
2013	CSI: Crime Scene Investigation	Laura Sidle	Episode: "Forget Me Not"
2014	Bones	Harriet White	Episode: "Big in the Philippines"
2015	Adventure Time	Bird Woman/Gunther	Voice role; 1 episode
