= After It Happened =

- Midnight Caller episode
- Jack Killian confronts Mike Barnes
- Episode no.: Season 1 Episode 3
- Directed by: Mimi Leder
- Written by: Stephen Zito
- Original air date: December 13, 1988
- Running time: 60 minutes

Guest appearances
- Kay Lenz; Richard Cox; J. D. Lewis; Julia Montgomery

Episode chronology
← Previous "But Not For Me"	Next → "Payback"

"After It Happened" is a 1988 episode of the NBC television series Midnight Caller. The controversial episode tells the story of a bisexual man who is deliberately infecting people with HIV, including series lead character Jack Killian's ex-girlfriend. Activists for HIV/AIDS awareness and LGBT rights disrupted filming, citing concerns over the negative portrayal of bisexual and HIV-positive people and fears that the show would make people with AIDS the targets of violence. Series executives made some changes to the script in response to these concerns, but activists were still displeased.

"After It Happened" performed well in the ratings but received a mixed critical response. Actress Kay Lenz received an Emmy Award for her guest-starring role as Killian's ex-girlfriend Tina. NBC aired a follow-up episode in 1989 in which Tina is near death. This second script, "Someone to Love", was written in consultation with some of the groups that protested "After It Happened" and was much more favorably received.

== Plot ==
Talk radio host Jack Killian is approached by his ex-girlfriend, Tina Cassidy. She tells him that she has become pregnant and infected with HIV from a one-night stand. She wants Jack's help in finding the man so she can inform him of the pregnancy and her HIV status. Killian learns that the man, Mike Barnes, is aware of his HIV status and is deliberately infecting people. In his search for Barnes, Jack meets some of his other victims, including his partner Ross, whom Mike abandoned when Ross got sick, and Kelly West, another one-night stand. Unable to stop Mike legally from infecting people, Jack warns the city about him on his program. Mike confronts Jack about the broadcast but their argument is interrupted by Kelly, who pulls a gun on Mike. Jack talks Kelly out of killing Mike.

== Cast ==
- Gary Cole as Jack 'Nighthawk' Killian
- Wendy Kilbourne as Devon King
- Kay Lenz as Tina Cassidy
- Richard Cox as Mike Barnes
- J. D. Lewis as Ross Parker
- Julia Montgomery as Kelly West

== Controversy and critical response ==
When "After It Happened" went into production in San Francisco in October 1988, the script originally ended with Kelly shooting Mike to death. This script was leaked to AIDS activist groups, who were outraged. They contended that the script as written increased the likelihood of vigilante violence against LGBT people and people with AIDS. Series executive producer Bob Singer disagreed, saying, "The hero says that the murder is absolutely the wrong solution. No one watching it could think we were condoning this by any stretch of the imagination." Three groups took the lead in organizing the protests: the San Francisco AIDS Foundation; ACT UP San Francisco; and Mobilization Against AIDS. On October 20 about 60 ACT UP demonstrators shut down outdoor filming by chanting, blowing whistles and disabling lighting equipment. This was the first time that a gay-related disruption caused a production to be suspended since the 1979 protests against the film Cruising in New York City. Midnight Caller production company Lorimar Television agreed to alter the script. The ending was changed so that Kelly would still kill Mike but would be shown being arrested. Activists still considered this unacceptable and swore to continue disrupting the filming. Lorimar obtained temporary restraining orders against two of the protest groups on October 24, requiring them to stay at least 100 feet away from filming; the activists promptly announced that they would ignore the orders. Demonstrators shut down production again on October 25. Singer announced that day that the ending would be changed again, to eliminate Mike's killing entirely. Some additional changes were made, such as including a scene in which the bartender at a gay bar denounces Mike's behaviour as "irresponsible", but Lorimar refused to meet another demand, that Mike be unaware of his HIV status. Lorimar executive Leslie Moonves denied that the changes were politically motivated, saying simply "we were concerned about being responsible."

On the night of the broadcast, between 200 and 300 demonstrators organized by ACT UP San Francisco picketed San Francisco's then-NBC affiliate, KRON, demanding that the station not air the episode. Around 150 people occupied the lobby and 10 who refused to leave were arrested. About a dozen members of ACT UP Philadelphia demonstrated outside that city's then-NBC affiliate, KYW. KRON went ahead with the broadcast but opened the program with a disclaimer:

Tonight's episode of Midnight Caller deals with the topic of AIDS. San Francisco is a role model in AIDS education and has set the standard for effective and humane public policy.

The station referred viewers with questions to the San Francisco AIDS Foundation. Following the episode, KRON aired Midnight Caller: The Response, a live 30-minute news special in which city health officials and community leaders expressed their concerns with the episode's content. Activists continued to denounce the episode, with the AIDS Foundation's Steven Petrow saying, "By broadcasting a program that portrays an individual with the AIDS virus as a malicious, calculating killer who's out to infect others, we believe NBC is exhibiting the same type of callousness and ignorance that ignites and perpetuates acts of AIDS-related discrimination and violence." A publicist for Lorimar, Barry Stagg, disagreed with this assessment. While acknowledging that the changes made at the behest of the AIDS groups were effective, he defended the episode, saying, "We think a lot of good will come out of this episode and that people will think more carefully about responsible sex." Years later series star Gary Cole said of the protesters, "They got it all wrong. We didn't exploit the tragedy of AIDS — we made an interesting TV show which covered a subject worrying more and more people."

"After It Happened" finished second in its time slot, behind an episode of thirtysomething. The episode was 33rd overall for the week, earning a 13.5 household rating. Reviews were mixed. Television critic Jon Burlingame, while finding the episode preachy in places (which he blames on the rewrites), finds that it "includes moments of strong drama" and is "not the flame-fanning irresponsible TV show that some protesters have painted". Robert DiMatteo sharply differed. Although he praised some of the episode's moments, as when Jack physically comforts Tina (thus showing that there is no risk of HIV transmission through casual contact), other parts of the story were dismissed as simplistic and the characterization of Mike Barnes as "ludicrous and moldy, like [something] from The Boys in the Band". Yardena Arar found the scenario "far-fetched" and insulting to the intelligence of the women of San Francisco. Guest star Kay Lenz won an Emmy for her role as Tina.

== "Someone to Love" ==
Midnight Caller revisited the subject of AIDS in season 2 with the episode "Someone to Love", with Tina, near death, returning to Jack. Stephen Zito also wrote the script for this episode. Now having a better idea of the politics of AIDS in San Francisco, Zito met with some of the groups who had protested the original episode and members of a support group for women with AIDS; he spent five months writing. Guest star Lenz, reprising her role as Tina, also met with the support group. The support group idea was incorporated into the episode, with other women infected by Mike Barnes forming one and going on Killian's show. Much of what they said was taken directly from the group with whom Zito and Lenz met. The San Francisco AIDS Foundation praised the script, calling it "an extremely accurate and honest portrayal" that illustrated the issues faced by people with AIDS.
