= 2012 in American television =

In American television in 2012, notable events included television show debuts, finales, and cancellations; channel launches, closures, and rebrandings; stations changing or adding their network affiliations; and information about controversies and carriage disputes.

== Events ==
=== January ===
Date	Event
1	Regional sports networks MSG and MSG Plus go dark on Time Warner Cable systems in the New York City area and upstate New York after Time Warner and the networks' parent, MSG Media, fail to reach a new fee-for-carriage agreement. The two sides reached a resolution to restore the signals on February 17, a deal that also restores MSG-owned music channel Fuse TV to Time Warner systems (TWC had dropped Fuse in December 2011).
1	Three stations and their related satellites in the Casper and Cheyenne, Wyoming, markets vanish from the Dish Network lineup due to a retransmission dispute. The stations are Casper's KTWO-TV (ABC), KGWC (CBS), and KFNB (Fox) and Cheyenne's KLWY (Fox/ABC).
2	Versus rebrands as NBC Sports Network, reflecting the sports channel's common ownership and synergies with NBC Sports.
4	The Walt Disney Company and Comcast announce a 10-year distribution agreement to deliver content from Disney-owned networks and ABC owned-and-operated stations to Comcast's multiple Xfinity platforms, including TV, online, video on demand, smartphones, and tablet computers.
5	Neal Tiles steps down from his position as president and CEO of G4 and is replaced by Adam Stotsky.
5	Cowles Media announces a reorganization in the news department of its stations in the Santa Maria/Santa Barbara market, KCOY-TV (CBS) and KKFX-CA (Fox), that includes several layoffs of on- and off-screen personnel, the elimination of its sports department, and the move of the evening anchor desk out of market to Monterey Bay area sister station KION-TV.
9	CBS This Morning, the network's attempt at a unique news-and-analysis-intensive morning show, makes its debut, featuring a host team of Erica Hill, Gayle King, and Charlie Rose.
13	A week-long commemoration of Today's 60th anniversary culminates in a gathering of past and current personalities from the NBC morning program.
13	After more than 11,000 episodes, long-running daytime drama One Life to Live ended its nearly 44-year-run on ABC.
14	Sunbeam Television's stations in Miami (WSVN) and Boston (WHDH-TV and WLVI) go dark on DirecTV after talks to increase the retransmission fees by a reported 300% failed. The two sides reached an agreement on January 26 to restore the signals.
16	Lionsgate Entertainment and One Equity Partners announce that they will explore a sale of their TV Guide Network, whose conversion over the years from a listings guide to an entertainment channel has made it profitable enough for a sale by the two companies.
17	Food Network personality Paula Deen, known for her high-calorie recipes, reveals on Today that she has Diabetes mellitus type 2, and was diagnosed with the condition in 2008 (choosing not to reveal her condition until now in part to avert health rumors).
23	NBC Sports reaches a four-year deal for exclusive rights (on NBC and NBC Sports Network) to the Breeders' Cup thoroughbred horse racing championships beginning with the November 3 event. The deal includes the first prime time staging of event's premiere race, the Breeders' Cup Classic. The deal reunites the Breeders' Cup with NBC, which broadcast the first 21 editions of the event (with ESPN holding rights from 2006 to 2011).
25	Bill Myers steps down from his position as president and CEO of Starz Entertainment after 10 years with the company.
30	Following the lead of Telemundo (who has done it in one form or another since 2003), Univision becomes the second Spanish-language network to provide English subtitles (appearing as closed captions on CC3) on its weeknight telenovelas, an effort to attract viewers who do not speak or are not fluent in the Spanish language.
30–31	A shakeup in the on-air makeup of Fox's The X Factor takes place: The network confirms on the 30th that host Steve Jones and judge Nicole Scherzinger will not return for the show's 2nd season in the fall. The next day, judge Paula Abdul confirms she will not return either.

=== February ===
Date	Event
2	The FCC approves Time Warner Cable's $3 million purchase of Insight Communications, giving TWC access to Insight's 750,000 customers in Indiana, Kentucky and Ohio.
3	The FCC rules that television stations have the right to refuse to air ads under "reasonable access" provisions of the law pertaining to political candidates. The ruling comes after WMAQ-TV/Chicago rejected an anti-abortion ad that activist and presidential candidate Randall Terry wanted the NBC O&O to run during Super Bowl XLVI.
3	NFL Network announces it will expand its Thursday Night Football package from eight to 13 games beginning with the 2012 NFL season.
5	NBC's broadcast of Super Bowl XLVI, in which the New York Giants defeat the New England Patriots, attracts 111.3 million viewers. This is the third straight year that the NFL's championship event sets the all-time record for total viewership.
5	During a Super Bowl halftime show headlined by Madonna, guest singer M.I.A. appears to deliver a curse word and obscene gesture that escapes the reach of NBC's censors. The network and the NFL (the event's producer) both issue apologies afterwards for the incident.
6	Video distributor Netflix makes its original programming debut with the release of the comedy-drama series Lilyhammer.
8	CNN suspends commentator Roland S. Martin after he posted homophobic messages on his Twitter and Facebook pages the night of the Super Bowl.
12	CBS' broadcast of the 54th Grammy Awards—an event marked by remembrances of Whitney Houston (who died the previous day) and six wins for Adele—attract 39 million viewers, the biggest audience for the Grammys since 1984.
17	MSNBC announces that it has parted ways with political commentator Pat Buchanan, who was suspended by the network in October 2011 after the publication of a book he had authored that drew controversy for its content.
19	The 500th episode of The Simpsons, "At Long Last Leave", airs, marking the record for the highest number of episodes for a scripted television series.
20	Roberts Broadcasting announced it was exploring the possibility of selling one or all four of its television stations to raise enough cash to pay off its creditors.
21	Fulfilling a caveat in its 2011 purchase of NBCUniversal, Comcast announces it will launch four minority-owned networks on its cable systems within the next two years: the children-oriented BabyFirst Americas (which has planned April 2012 launch date); Aspire (summer 2012 launch), which will include positive, family-oriented programming; Revolt (2013 launch), a music- and artist-oriented channel; and El Rey (2014 launch), a general entertainment network.
24	In a cost-saving move, the E.W. Scripps Company announces that they will drop certain syndicated programs from its television stations beginning in September in favor of in-house programming and expansion of local content.
27	Thanks to the event's first ever postponement (due to rain), the Daytona 500 is run for the first time on a Monday night. Fox's broadcast of the race attracts 36 million viewers, the event's second biggest TV audience ever.
29	Molly Solomon is named executive producer for Golf Channel, becoming the first woman to hold such a position on a national TV sports network.
29	Video blogger James O'Keefe sues Keith Olbermann and Current TV after Olbermann says O'Keefe was convicted of rape (a charge which was actually reduced to harassment).

=== March ===
Date	Event
1	Nick Jr. Channel, Nickelodeon's 24-hour preschool-oriented cable channel, receives a brand new look produced by Gretel, Inc. and a new advertising campaign created by BBDO to coincide with the retirement of the network's former mascots, Moose A. Moose and Zee D. Bird.
1	Univision tlnovelas, a Univision Communications-owned cable channel devoted to Spanish-language telenovelas, launches on Dish Network as part of a carriage deal with the satellite provider to give it initial carriage of the channel and two other upstart cable networks owned by Univision.
7	WNBC/New York City announces it has declined to renew the contract of Sue Simmons, who has anchored the news on NBC's flagship station since 1980. Simmons leaves the station on June 15.
11	NBC Sports begins its relationship with Major League Soccer with an NBC Sports Network broadcast of a season-opening match between the New York Red Bulls and FC Dallas.
13	Tony Cassara submits his resignation as CEO of TV-station owner Young Broadcasting.
14	In the wake of the deaths of three horses during production, HBO announces that all production of Luck will permanently cease. The freshman series, set in the world of thoroughbred racing, had previously been renewed for a second season in 2013.
15	The CW announces the launch of a smartphone app that will offer next-morning streaming of CW primetime episodes (coinciding with a similar change in the timing of episode streaming on the network's website).
15	WLNY/Melville, New York, announces the suspension (effective March 29) of its 11 p.m. newscast, along with giving 20 of its 55 news staffers buyout offers. About 30 WLNY employees (including news anchor Richard Rose) will remain with the station following the completion of its purchase by CBS Corporation, after which WLNY's news operations will be combined with that of CBS' New York City flagship, WCBS-TV.
15	National Communications announces it will purchase Fox affiliate KUQI/Corpus Christi from High Maintenance Broadcasting, with its intent to enter into a shared services agreement with London Broadcasting-owned ABC affiliate KIII-TV.
17	Fox Sports San Diego, the newest affiliate of Fox Sports Net, makes its debut. It serves as the exclusive local TV home of the San Diego Padres, which is also its minority owner.
23	Disney Junior, Disney Channel's daytime children's programming block, becomes a standalone 24-hour cable channel. The channel replaces Soapnet, which remains available (in a limited, automated form) for some cable and satellite providers who have not yet finalized carriage deals for Disney Junior, as well for Cablevision and Verizon FiOS (both of them have kept Soapnet on the air and added Disney Junior to their lineups as an additional channel).
26	Providence Equity Partners announced that it will put all of Newport Television's 56 stations on the selling block in an effort to pay off debt.
26	The FCC approves the sale of WUPW/Toledo from LIN TV to American Spirit Media. The sale includes American Spirit ceding WUPW's daily operations (including news) to Raycom's Toledo station, WTOL-TV, via a shared services agreement (mirroring similar arrangements in four other markets where Raycom operates American Spirit stations).
30	Current TV announces the firing of Keith Olbermann, with his Countdown immediately replaced on this date by Viewpoint with Eliot Spitzer. Olberman filed a wrongful termination suit against Current TV on April 5.

=== April ===
Date	Event
1	Twenty-three broadcast stations owned by Tribune Broadcasting (notably stations in New York, Los Angeles, and Chicago) as well as WGN America disappear from DirecTV after the two companies fail to reach a carriage agreement before a midnight (ET) deadline. The stations and WGN America were restored on April 4, after a new carriage deal was reached.
1	C-SPAN founder Brian Lamb steps down from his position as CEO of the public affairs network, with Rob Kennedy and Susan Swain stepping in as co-CEOs (Lamb remains with C-SPAN as executive chairman).
2	Four Arkansas NBC stations operated by Nexstar Broadcasting Group jointly launch a statewide noon newscast titled Arkansas Today. The newscast originates from KARK-TV/Little Rock and is simulcast on and utilizes the news divisions of KTAL-TV/Texarkana, KTVE/El Dorado, and KNWA-TV/Fayetteville (the latter station produces sports segments for the program).
2	Nexstar launches a combined news operation, under the Eyewitness News banner, at its virtual duopoly in Wilkes-Barre/Scranton, Pennsylvania, on Nexstar-owned WBRE-TV and Mission Broadcasting's WYOU. The newscasts utilize existing WBRE news staff, and marks the return of local news on WYOU since that station's news division was shuttered in April 2009. The newscasts (along with existing outsourced newscasts on New Age Media-owned Fox affiliate WOLF-TV) are also upgraded to high-definition.
2	The Kentucky Wildcats defeat the Kansas Jayhawks 67–59 in the NCAA Men's Division I Basketball Championship, which aired on CBS.
7	The Univision Deportes Network commences programming. The Spanish language sports network owned by Univision Communications primarily features soccer from the Mexican Primera División.
10	MLB Strike Zone, a commercial-free subscription cable and satellite network, launches as a companion service to MLB Network. The channel allows viewers to watch various Tuesday and Friday evening Major League Baseball regular season games and features up-to-the-minute highlights from around the league.
11	ABC confirmed that it renewed its last soap opera General Hospital for an all-new season after 49 years and canceled its third lifestyle talk show The Revolution, which ended July 6, 2012, and was replaced permanently by Katie Couric's talk show Katie, which premiered September 10, 2012.
12	A ruling by a judicial panel on the United States Court of Appeals for the Ninth Circuit strikes down an FCC ban against political campaign and issue advertising on public television and radio stations, stating that the ban violates the First Amendment's free speech clause.
13	ABC's Good Morning America ends the week with 31,000 more viewers than Today, topping the NBC morning show in weekly ratings for the first time since December 1995 (ending an unprecedented 852-week win streak for Today).
14	Fox begins a regular (April through December) block of live Saturday night sports programming, featuring broadcasts of NASCAR, UFC, Major League Baseball, and Pac-12 Conference football.
16	DirecTV and Starz Entertainment reach a new carriage agreement which will allow the satellite provider to carry the online versions of Starz and Encore, as well as the linear, online and on demand versions of MoviePlex, IndiePlex and RetroPlex for the first time.
18	Cartoon Network announces plans to begin live streaming its linear television channel on its website and Apple mobile devices to customers of participating cable and satellite providers as part of parent company Time Warner's TV Everywhere initiative.
22	Fox commemorates its 25th anniversary of prime time programming with a two-hour retrospective special, preceded by re-airings of the first episodes to two of Fox's most noteworthy shows, Married... with Children (Fox's first prime time series) and The Simpsons (the longest-running scripted series).
23	CBS Television Distribution files a lawsuit against FamilyNet and its parent company ComStar, claiming that FamilyNet has aired CTD-owned shows without paying licensing fees (CTD claims FamilyNet's most recent payment was in June 2010).
23	WOW! acquires West Point, Georgia-based Knology for $1.5 billion in cash. The acquisition was completed on July 18, making WOW! the 9th largest cable operator in the United States.
26	Contestant Sharon Adams won the $100,000 top prize during the episode's bonus round on Wheel of Fortune after solving "Back in a Flash". This marked the second time an exact same puzzle which won the same top prize was reprised (Elyse Thomas on the May 15, 2006's episode also solved the same puzzle with $100,000 at stake).
30	A federal judge in Los Angeles rules that Dick Clark Productions acted properly when it negotiated a deal with NBC to produce the Golden Globe Awards broadcast for the network through 2018. The ruling is the outcome of a lawsuit against DCP by the Hollywood Foreign Press Association, the Globes' organizers, who argued that DCP acted without their approval.

=== May ===
Date	Event
1	Saban Capital Group subsidiary Kidsco Media Ventures LLC places a $10 million bid to acquire certain assets owned by 4Kids Entertainment, including the Yu-Gi-Oh! franchise and the CW4Kids program block. 4Kids commences an auction between Kidsco and Konami subsidiary 4K Acquisition Corp. on June 5; 4K Acquisition places a bid to acquire 4Kids' entire assets on June 7, which was later adjourned so 4Kids, Kidsco, and 4K Acquisition could consider an alternative transaction. 4Kids files a notice on June 15 outlining a proposed deal in which its assets will be split amongst Kidsco and 4K Acquisition, with the latter gaining rights to the Yu-Gi-Oh! assets, which is expected to be assessed on June 20, 2012.
2	Lifetime and sister channels Lifetime Movie Network and Lifetime Real Women rebrand with new logos and slogans.
3	Time Warner Cable announces a carriage agreement with News Corporation that will allow the provider to add four channels owned by India's STAR TV (Star Plus, STAR Gold, Life OK and STAR News) to its systems in certain markets with a large Southern Asian/Indian population.
4	Journal Communications files an application with the FCC to acquire, for $2 million, MyNetworkTV affiliate WACY/Appleton, which has been operated through Journal-owned NBC affiliate WGBA/Green Bay since 1994. Journal includes a "failed station" request to waive ownership limits that apply to the Green Bay/Appleton market, basing the request on WACY's condition prior to 1994 (the station had gone bankrupt under prior ownership and ceased operations in 1992).
6	In CBS, married couple Rachel and Dave Brown Jr. won the twentieth series of The Amazing Race; at eight legs, they tied with Rovilson Fernandez & Marc Nelson (from The Amazing Race Asia 2) for winning the most legs in a single season, as well as the best-performing winning team in Race history.
7	ABC News and Univision announce that they will partner on a new English-language news network that will cater to a Hispanic audience. The network, known as Fusion, has a target launch date of late summer 2013.
7	LIN Media announces that it will acquire the 13 television stations owned by New Vision Television in eight markets: Portland, Birmingham, Wichita, Honolulu, Savannah, Youngstown (two stations), Topeka (two stations) and Mason City. The deal, which is completed on October 12 at a $342 million price, includes the assumption of $12 million in debt as well as the operations (via shared services agreements) of three stations owned by PBC Broadcasting (in Topeka, Youngstown and Savannah).
8	H3 Communications (owned by the adult children of Charles Harker, owner of local ABC affiliate WABG and NBC affiliate WNBD-LD through licensee Commonwealth Broadcasting Group) announces its intent to purchase CBS affiliate WXVT/Greenville, Mississippi, from Saga Communications for $3 million. If approved by the FCC, the Harker family will have control of all three major network affiliates in the Greenville-Greenwood market.
9	ESPN extends its agreement with the Atlantic Coast Conference, expanding coverage of ACC athletic events through the 2026–2027 academic year in a deal reportedly worth $3.6 billion.
9	TV Land rebrands with a new logo, retiring the multi-squared logo the network had used in various forms since its 1996 inception.
13	After 10 seasons on air, CBS announced that they have canceled CSI: Miami, the first show in the CSI franchise to end.
14	Charter Communications signs a carriage agreement with Liberman Broadcasting to carry its Spanish-language network Estrella TV on Charter systems in certain Latino/Hispanic markets.
14	Fox confirms that Demi Lovato and Britney Spears will join the judges' panel of The X Factor for the show's second season in the fall.
15	Sinclair Broadcast Group and Fox extend an affiliation agreement with Sinclair's 19 Fox affiliates for five years through 2017. The deal includes an option, exercisable from July 2012 thru March 2013, for Sinclair to purchase Fox-owned MyNetworkTV affiliate WUTB/Baltimore, while also allowing Fox the option to purchase Sinclair-owned stations in three of four markets: Raleigh, Las Vegas, Cincinnati and Norfolk (all of which are either MNT standalones or CW/MNT duopolies).
16	Time Warner Cable and Viacom settle a lawsuit filed in April 2011 over carriage of Viacom-owned cable channels on TWC's in-home streaming app for tablets and computers. As part of the agreement, Time Warner Cable resumes carriage of Viacom channels made available on the app prior to the lawsuit such as MTV, CMT and Comedy Central, and also adds additional channels such as MTV Hits and MTV Jams and the high-definition versions of TV Land and BET.
17	Intermountain West Communications Company announces two of its Idaho stations, KXTF/Twin Falls and KFXP/Pocatello (the latter is operated by Intermountain West through a management agreement with Compass Communications), will disaffiliate from Fox effective July 1, 2012, due to a retransmission consent dispute between Intermountain West and Fox citing demands for compensation payments that the company alleged exceeds both stations' current revenue. Intermountain West has announced it will seek primary affiliations with This TV (a joint venture between Weigel Broadcasting and MGM) for the two stations.
22	Donald Driver wins the 14th season of Dancing with the Stars.
23	Dish Network files lawsuits against ABC, CBS, Fox and NBC in response to litigation threats by those networks regarding the recently unveiled AutoHop feature on its Hopper DVR device's "PrimeTime Anytime" service, which automatically skips commercials during pre-recorded programming. Dish's suit asks for a declaratory judgment that the AutoHop feature does not infringe copyrights. CBS, Fox and NBC countersue Dish alleging the feature violates copyright law and may compromise their advertising revenue.
23	A visitor identified as Ray Miles enters the studios of CBS affiliate WIBW-TV/Topeka and demands to have the station investigate how the local Department of Veterans Affairs was handling his case. After the station's news director refuses Miles' request for the second time (he had previously visited the station on March 22 to discuss the issue), Miles turns violent: he destroys the studio lobby, threatens newsroom staffers and stabs the station's sales manager and a sales associate in the leg before being taken down and held until police arrive.
23	Phillip Phillips wins the 11th season of American Idol, beating Jessica Sanchez (the latter as the best-performing contestant with the "Judge's Save" first introduced in season eight) in a record-breaking 132 million votes cast.
23	After debuting in February, independent station WADL/Mount Clemens, Michigan, cancels its half-hour 9 p.m. newscast (produced under a partnership with Journal Register Company and the Independent News Network). The news department's existence saw the abrupt firing of initial news director Matt Stevens in February after one day of employment (following a confrontation between acting station president Kevin O'Brien and station management regarding O'Brien's firing), replaced the following month with WADL program host Joelle Lukasiewicz (wife of Kevin Adell, CEO of owner Adell Broadcasting).
25	Time Warner Cable reaches an agreement with Cordillera Communications, restoring four stations owned by the Evening Post Publishing Company subsidiary in TWC's Corpus Christi, Texas, service area (NBC affiliate KRIS-TV, KRIS' CW subchannel, Telemundo affiliate K68DJ, and independent station K47DF); the deal ends a five-month retransmission consent dispute between the two companies that resulted in the stations being pulled on December 12, 2011.
25	Three Honolulu television stations — PBS member station KHET, TBN O&O KAAH, and multicultural independent KIKU — are served with a Notice of Violation by the FCC for failure to retransmit the monthly Emergency Alert System test on May 1 and failing to air the audio script on the March 1 test.
26	Discovery Networks-owned Planet Green — a channel that originally aired eco-centric programming before concentrating on archived Discovery Channel documentaries — is rebranded and revamped to Destination America, which features American-centric food, travel, history and adventure programming.
26	After a four-year hiatus, the action-oriented animated programming block Toonami returns to Cartoon Network as part of their Adult Swim programming block.
28	New Orleans based regional sports network Cox Sports Television's coverage of the NBA's New Orleans Hornets ends after the channel decides not to renew its contract with the team. As a result, Fox Sports Net picked up the rights to the team on June 25, and launched the new channel Fox Sports New Orleans on October 31.
30	Fox Television Stations signs an agreement with AccuWeather to provide on-air and online weather content in 11 out of 16 markets where Fox has an owned-and-operated station, which include providing meteorological data, online weather products and the addition of 24-hour weather services on digital multicast channels.
30	The third and final episode of the History miniseries Hatfields & McCoys draws 14.2 million viewers, setting a new record for a non-sports program on ad-supported cable and breaking the record (13.9 million viewers) set by the first episode on May 28.
30	NBC affiliate WDAM-TV in Hattiesburg, Mississippi, officially announces that WDAM-DT2 will become an ABC affiliate on June 11, giving ABC its first full-time affiliate in the Hattiesburg-Laurel market.
31	Buckeye CableSystem (owned by Block Communications) files a lawsuit against the owners of two Toledo television stations: Raycom Media, which owns CBS affiliate WTOL and American Spirit Media, owner of Fox affiliate WUPW (which has been operated under a shared services agreement with WTOL since April 20), alleging the station groups are demanding higher carriage fees to continue allowing the cable provider to broadcast WUPW.

=== June ===
Date	Event
1	Two Louisville stations owned by Block Communications (Fox affiliate WDRB and MyNetworkTV affiliate WMYO) disappear from Insight Communications systems within the market, the result of a dispute with Time Warner Cable, which purchased Insight in February 2012 and asked for a re-negotiation of their retransmission consent agreement with the stations. The stations' signals were restored on June 6, after both companies reach a fee agreement.
1	New York Network, the television production arm of the State University of New York, announced it will cease operations at the end of a phaseout period of several months, due to its equipment becoming obsolete.
1	MountainWest Sports Network (informally known as The Mtn.) discontinues operations. The channel, a joint venture between the Mountain West Conference, NBCUniversal and CBS Corporation, aired MWC sporting events since its 2006 launch but was plagued by lack of full cable/satellite coverage in the conference's territory. The closure is also the result of the MWC's ongoing realignment.
1	The district attorney in Utah County, Utah, officially drops bigamy charges (a third-degree felony in Utah) against Kody Brown and his family, the stars of the TLC reality series Sister Wives, after it was determined that despite being married to four wives there was no evidence or signs of fraud that would warrant any criminal charges.
1	DirecTV's 24-hour 3D channel n3D (which launched in July 2010 as the first 3D television channel to operate 24 hours a day) cuts back its programming hours to become a part-time service, citing lack of programming available in the 3D format.
2	Low-powered Fox affiliate KNPN-LD/St. Joseph, Missouri, is launched by locally based media firm News-Press & Gazette Company. Along with airing 22 hours of local newscasts weekly, it simulcasts two channels that were formerly cable-exclusive (local news and weather channel News-Press 3 NOW and CW Plus affiliate St. Joseph CW 6) on its second and third digital subchannels, and carries Telemundo on a fourth subchannel. It replaces WDAF/Kansas City as the default Fox affiliate for Suddenlink, Dish Network, and DirecTV subscribers (DirecTV will not add the station until July 1).
4	Allegedly in response to an ad run during a June 3 episode of AMC's Mad Men asking customers to urge Dish Network to keep AMC Networks' channels on the satellite provider (both companies have been embroiled in a carriage dispute), Dish abruptly relocates AMC and sibling channels WE tv and IFC to higher channel positions (AMC from channel 130 to 9609 for SD and 9610 for HD, WEtv from 128 to 9608 and IFC from 393 to 9607), with HDNet, Style and Indieplex filling their former channel positions. Sibling network Sundance Channel had already been removed from Dish two weeks earlier on May 20.
5	The Walt Disney Company announces that, beginning in 2015, it will impose limits on advertising for food and beverage products across its kid-targeted media properties (TV, radio, and internet) to only accept ads for those that meet certain nutritional guidelines. The change affects Disney-owned commercial-free channels Disney Channel and Disney Junior (which limit traditional advertising to underwriter sponsorships) and children's programming on ad-supported channels including ABC Family and Disney XD (ABC's educational and informational programming syndication provider has not sold any child-targeted ads in that block since it took over).
5	DirecTV removes WABI-TV/Bangor, Maine (which carries CBS and The CW) and WCJB-TV/Gainesville, Florida (which carries ABC and The CW) after it fails to reach a carriage deal with their owner Diversified Communications, claiming the company wanted 300% more than their previous retransmission consent agreement.
6	Hoak Media blocks access to 14 of its stations from Dish Network due to an unresolved carriage dispute in which Dish alleges that Hoak asked for a 200% rate increase for carriage of its stations and demanded that the satellite provider eliminate its controversial AutoHop commercial-skipping DVR feature. Hoak's signals were restored on Dish by June 14.
11	Good Morning America host Robin Roberts reveals to viewers that she has a rare blood disease known as Myelodysplastic syndrome and that her sister, WWL-TV/New Orleans anchor Sally-Ann Roberts, will be her donor for a bone marrow transplant that will take place in the fall. She will continue in her role as the show's co-host during her treatments.
11	Warner Bros. Television acquires Alloy Entertainment from investment group ZelnickMedia, with Warner closing the deal in the fourth quarter and retaining Alloy's staff. Both companies are co-producers on five shows: Gossip Girl, The Vampire Diaries, Pretty Little Liars, The Lying Game and 666 Park Avenue.
13	21 years after ending its original run on CBS, the classic soap opera Dallas returns to television, this time on TNT, with several of its original cast members reprising their roles.
14	LM Communications, LLC (founded by Lynn Martin, owner of 12 radio stations in Kentucky, South Carolina and West Virginia) announces its intent to purchase CW affiliate WBKI-TV/Louisville, Kentucky, from Louisville TV Licenses, LLC. Block Communications (owners of Fox affiliate WDRB and MyNetworkTV affiliate WMYO) entered into a shared services agreement with WBKI on June 22.
14	The Walt Disney Company launches apps for Apple iOS devices (iPhone, iPad and iPod Touch) offering live streams of Disney Channel, Disney XD and Disney Junior to Comcast Xfinity subscribers, as well as on-demand content from the kid-oriented cable channels (including a limited array of on-demand content accessible to non-Comcast subscribers).
15	A U.S. District Court judge in Los Angeles turns down CBS' request to block the June 18 premiere of ABC's The Glass House. CBS has sued ABC for copyright infringement over The Glass House, claiming the reality competition closely resembles its Big Brother, where several Glass House staffers had previously worked.
15	In an event telecast by ABC, daredevil Nik Wallenda crosses Niagara Falls on a wire, becoming the first person to complete the feat (and the first in 116 years to even attempt it). During his walk, Wallenda is attached to the 2-inch-wide wire by a tether, a precaution insisted on by ABC.
18	Just two years after they were replaced by a real band, Victorious Secrets (later renamed American Secrets), in a contest, FreeCreditScore.com brings back the "Original Band" for a series of new ads, due to popular demand and a "mistake" by the agency that decided to drop the fake band in 2010.
20	Just one month after cancelling the series, CBS announces that it will bring Unforgettable back for a 13-episode 2nd season that will air in the Summer of 2013.
21	In a ruling favoring US broadcast networks, the United States Supreme Court determines that the FCC violated its due process in failing to give advance notice on policies concerning isolated instances of fleeting offensive words and nudity on television. However, the court declines to issue a much broader ruling (which the broadcasters had hoped would occur) that the FCC's indecency policies constituted a violation of the First Amendment, meaning that the FCC can continue to limit what can be said or broadcast on television.
23	ESPN launches espnW, a live streaming website spun off from ESPN3 and dedicated to women's sports; the debut coincides with the 40th anniversary of Title IX, the federal law commonly regarded as the springboard for increased involvement of females in athletics.
23	The 39th Daytime Emmy Awards air on HLN, the first time the event airs on cable.
25	The University of Central Florida's board of trustees approves the school's purchase of WMFE-TV/Orlando from Community Communications. It's Community's 2nd attempt to sell WMFE (an earlier deal to sell to Daystar Television Network fell through in March), and, should the FCC approve the license transfer, would likely return PBS programming to WMFE, which dropped the network in July 2011 (since that time, UCF has programmed Brevard Community College-owned WBCC-DT1 with PBS programming through a time-lease agreement).
25	KSAX/Alexandria, Minnesota, and its Redwood Falls satellite KRWF (both ABC affiliates owned by Hubbard Broadcasting) are converted into full-time satellites of Hubbard television flagship KSTP/St. Paul, resulting in the elimination of local news and weather inserts during simulcasts of KSTP's local newscasts and the layoffs of 17 of KSAX's 19 employees. KSAX/KRWF's Alexandria studio will remain open as a news bureau and sales office, and local commercial inserts will be retained.
25	Fox affiliate WXXV-TV in Gulfport, Mississippi, announces that it will affiliate WXXV-DT2 with NBC, giving the Biloxi-Gulfport market its first full-time NBC affiliate. WXXV-TV also relaunches an in-house news department for both stations.
27	Aspire, a digital cable and satellite network owned by a joint venture consisting of Comcast and Magic Johnson that airs programming geared towards African American families, makes its debut on Comcast.
27	DirecTV announces they are in a carriage dispute with Northwest Broadcasting, owner of six stations in four states (Washington, Oregon, Texas and New York), claiming the company is asking double the amount of their previous agreement.
28	After days of speculation regarding her future on the program, Ann Curry bids an emotional farewell as co-host of NBC's Today, moving to a correspondent and anchor-at-large position for NBC News. On June 29, the network announces that Savannah Guthrie, host of Today's third hour, will replace Curry effective July 9.
28	News Corporation announces its intention to split into two separate companies, an entertainment unit (which will include the Fox network and its cable channels) which eventually becomes known as 21st Century Fox, and a publishing unit, which retains the News Corporation name.
28	ESPN signs a 12-year extension agreement with the Pasadena Tournament of Roses Association to retain the U.S. broadcast rights to the Rose Bowl Game from 2015 through 2026.

=== July ===
Date	Event
2	HDNet rebrands as AXS TV, beginning a refocus towards lifestyle and live event programming. The change is a result of the purchase of a share in the channel by a joint venture consisting of Ryan Seacrest, Anschutz Entertainment Group and Creative Artists Agency, a deal announced on January 18 (original co-owner/co-founder Mark Cuban retains a share).
2	After being interviewed in an online article by The Daily Beast, CNN anchorman and syndicated talk show host Anderson Cooper officially comes out as a homosexual man, thus confirming rumors about his sexuality that have surrounded his life.
2	The CW announces a partnership with Saban to take over the network's children's program block Toonzai, bringing programs such as Saban's Yu-Gi-Oh! and Power Rangers to the network and ending the current partnership with 4Kids Entertainment.
2	The Weather Channel announces plans to acquire Weather Underground, one of the internet's oldest weather services. While the site will no longer operate independently, Weather Underground will retain all existing staff and be run separately from TWC's online services.
6	Dish Network subscribers within the Youngstown, Ohio, market lose access to NBC affiliate WFMJ-TV, the result of a breakdown in re-negotiations between the satellite provider and owner Vindicator Printing Company to renew the station's carriage agreement.
7	NBC and Telemundo replace their weekend morning Qubo children's program blocks with NBC Kids and MiTelemundo, both preschool-oriented lineups are programmed by PBS Kids Sprout (which NBC's parent company NBCUniversal jointly owns with Sesame Workshop, Apax Partners and PBS). Qubo will continue as a program block on Ion Television and as a 24-hour multicast channel on that network's stations (NBCUniversal will also continue to maintain an ownership stake in the channel).
9	ABC launches Good Afternoon America, an afternoon extension of Good Morning America, hosted by Josh Elliott and Lara Spencer. The show is a temporary placeholder (airing for a nine-week limited run) for ABC's 2 p.m. (Eastern Time) slot, an hour where ABC would relocate General Hospital after it cedes the 3 p.m. (ET) slot (GH's longtime home) to its affiliates on September 10. GMA would get their afternoon extension back six years later on September 10, 2018, as GMA Day.
10	13 stations owned by Hearst Television are removed from Time Warner Cable, Bright House Networks and Insight Communications systems in Honolulu, Cincinnati, Plattsburgh, Boston, Manchester, Kansas City (two stations), Winston-Salem, Tampa, Orlando (two stations), Portland (Maine), Omaha, Louisville and Clarksburg (via Pittsburgh) after Hearst and TWC fail to reach a carriage agreement. Except for Honolulu (where only a message explaining the removal of the local Hearst-owned ABC affiliate is shown, which resulted in asking KHON and Hawaii News Now to simulcast their televised Honolulu Mayor's debate on July 11; its channel was later replaced with the Hallmark Movie Channel on July 13), the affected stations were replaced by out-of-market affiliates of their corresponding networks, including Nexstar-owned stations from Rochester, Wilkes-Barre and Terre Haute; the move prompted Nexstar to file legal action against TWC for using its stations as de facto affiliates in the affected markets without consent. Hearst's Milwaukee station, which was granted an exemption due to a technicality from a prior agreement with Charter Communications, was pulled from TWC on July 13. Both Time Warner and Hearst reached a deal that restored the stations back on the systems on July 19.
10	Shortly before midnight ET, 17 Viacom-owned networks (most notably MTV, Nickelodeon, Comedy Central and VH1) are removed from DirecTV after both companies fail to reach a new carriage agreement, with both sides accusing the other of being responsible. DirecTV replaced the channels with compatible outlets from other companies. In response to DirecTV advising subscribers to view original programming from the affected networks online, Viacom "temporarily slimmed down" access to current and other recent episodes of many programs from their websites on July 11, remaining in place until a deal is reached (as DirecTV does not offer internet service, the removal of Viacom-owned episodic streaming program content also affected internet users that do not subscribe to DirecTV, with access to this content mainly being restricted to subscription streaming websites such as Netflix and Hulu Plus). On July 18, renewed negotiations between the companies broke off after reportedly Viacom asked DirecTV to pay $500 million to carry premium channel Epix. The Viacom channels were restored on DirecTV after a new carriage agreement was made on July 20, with DirecTV gaining rights to carry live streams of Viacom-owned channels for its subscribers on laptops and mobile devices.
10	NBCUniversal confirms plans to sell its 15.8% stake in A+E Networks to co-owners The Walt Disney Company and Hearst Corporation, who will become 50-50 partners in the joint venture.
12–13	Two members of American Idol's judging panel, Steven Tyler (on the 12th) and Jennifer Lopez (on the 13th), announce their departures from the show after two seasons.
13	A Delaware bankruptcy court grants Tribune Company (owners of 23 television stations including WGN-TV/Chicago, KTLA/Los Angeles and WPIX/New York City, superstation WGN America, Antenna TV and 19 U.S. newspapers) approval of its reorganization plan for the company to emerge from Chapter 11 bankruptcy protection (Tribune filed for Chapter 11 in 2008 after accruing $13 billion in unsustainable debt from Sam Zell's $8 billion buyout of the company the year before). The company's senior debt holders, investment groups Oaktree Capital Management, JPMorgan Chase and Angelo, Gordon & Co., will assume control of Tribune Company. Tribune's junior creditor Aurelius Capital Management and indenture trustees Law Debenture Trust Company and Deutsche Bank Trust Company appealed the July 23 confirmation decision in the case, with Aurelius asking presiding U.S. Bankruptcy Judge Kevin Carey to stay the consummation of the restructuring plan. The junior creditors won a stay of the bankruptcy plan confirmation order on August 22 on the pretense the appealing parties pay a $1.5 billion bond by August 29.
15	After 16 years since the inception of MSNBC, NBC News ends their partnership with Microsoft and rebrands their website as NBCNews.com. The decision was the result of issues regarding contract requirements that prevented Microsoft from using news content from other outlets on its co-owned websites, as well as NBC trying to distance its online news content from public perceptions of a slant towards a political ideology due to the MSNBC television channel's gradual programming shift to appeal to a liberal audience. NBC News plans to launch a new website for MSNBC by 2013.
17	Scripps Networks Interactive strikes a new multi-year carriage agreement with Comcast that will result in on-demand program content from Scripps-owned cable networks (such as HGTV and Food Network) being made available to Comcast Xfinity subscribers through its linear television and online services as well as through mobile devices.
18	Suddenlink Communications accepts a buyout offer from BC Partners Ltd., several investment firms (including Goldman Sachs, Quadrangle Group and Oaktree Capital Management) and company management, led by chairman and CEO Jerry Kent to purchase the cable operator for $6.6 billion ($2 billion in cash, along with the assumption of $4.6 billion in debt).
18	Montreal-based Cogeco purchases Quincy, Massachusetts-based cable operator Atlantic Broadband for $1.36 billion. The purchase will expand the presence of Cogeco (which already operates cable systems in several Eastern Canada provinces, primarily Ontario and Quebec) into the United States.
19	Newport Television announces the sale of 22 stations to three broadcasting firms: Nexstar Broadcasting Group will purchase 10 stations for $285 million (included are Little Rock duopoly KLRT/KASN, to be spun off to Mission Broadcasting (which is involved in several local marketing agreements with Nexstar in other markets) due to existing ownership of KARK and KARZ). Sinclair Broadcast Group will acquire six stations in San Antonio, Harrisburg, Cincinnati, Mobile and Wichita, along with local marketing agreements with stations in Harrisburg and Wichita. Cox Media Group will also purchase two duopolies: WAWS–WTEV/Jacksonville and KOKI–KMYT/Tulsa, all pending FCC approval (Cox later announced on July 20 that it will sell its television stations in El Paso, Johnstown, Steubenville and Reno [including an LMA with Reno's MyNetworkTV affiliate]). Newport will continue to seek buyers for stations in Bakersfield, Fresno, Rochester, Albany and Eugene that were not included in the pending deals.
19	Through an agreement separate from its purchase of six Newport Television-owned stations, Sinclair Broadcast Group will acquire the assets of shareholder-owned Bay Television, Inc., owners of MyNetworkTV affiliate WTTA/Tampa, for $40 million. Sinclair has operated WTTA under a local marketing agreement since 1998 (although not in conjunction with another station, as Sinclair does not own any other television stations in the Tampa Bay market).
19	Actor/comedian Fred Willard is removed from his narrator duties on the upcoming PBS series (and Antiques Roadshow spinoff) Market Warriors, following his July 18 arrest on lewd conduct charges after Los Angeles police officers allegedly caught Willard exposing his genitalia inside an adult movie theater in Hollywood. Antiques Roadshow host Mark L. Walberg will replace Willard as narrator of the program, including narrating episodes that were already completed with Willard.
24	The Federal Communications Commission upholds a December 2011 ruling in a complaint case filed by The Tennis Channel, Inc. (owners of Tennis Channel) against Comcast, that alleged the cable provider discriminated against the channel by putting Comcast-owned sports channels (such as Golf Channel and NBC Sports Network) in digital basic programming tiers, while placing Tennis Channel on digital sports tiers that have fewer subscribers; the ruling required Comcast to move the Tennis Channel to the same tier as its co-owned networks. This is the first instance in which the FCC upheld a program carriage complaint by an independent company.
24	Actors Sofía Vergara, Jesse Tyler Ferguson, Eric Stonestreet, Julie Bowen and Ty Burrell (later joined by Ed O'Neill) file a lawsuit against 20th Century Fox Television arguing that their contracts for the ABC series Modern Family violate California state laws prohibiting personal service contracts from extending for longer than seven years (the lawsuit states the contracts required the actors to work on the series from February 2009 to June 2016) and include a cap on the percentage of annual salary increases that the actors receive for each additional season of the show. The lawsuit asks a judge to grant a ruling to void the contracts as the suit claims that clauses within them prohibit the actors from other work. The actors agreed to new contracts on July 27, effectively ending the lawsuit as part of the agreement.
24	Hearst Television extends its affiliation deal with MeTV for three years through 2015 and expands the digital network to five more outlets in Boston, Sacramento, Winston-Salem, Oklahoma City and Baltimore.
25	News-Press & Gazette Company enters the Columbia–Jefferson City, Missouri, market with the purchase of ABC affiliate KMIZ (including its MyNetworkTV and MeTV affiliated subchannels) and Fox affiliate KQFX-LD from JW Broadcasting for $16 million.
26	Google announces the launch of a fiber optic television service set to make its initial roll out in Kansas City in September (alongside a high speed internet service also set to be offered by Google). Neighborhoods that initially receive the TV and internet services will be selected through feedback from Kansas City area residents and online registration. Google Fiber TV (which will also provide live streams of program content to iPad and Android devices) debuts with the absence of cable networks owned by Time Warner, The Walt Disney Company, AMC Networks and News Corporation from its channel lineup due to Google being unable to sign carriage agreements with those companies.
26	The Spokane Public Schools announced that it will vote to end its relationship with PBS member station KSPS, which the school holds the license for (one of five PBS outlets in the United States owned by public schools; six that are owned by municipalities overall) and has funded since its 1967 sign-on but since 1972 had been run by a non-profit group (Friends of KSPS), due to financial reasons.
26	CBS Sports Network signs an agreement with the United Football League giving the channel the television rights to broadcast Wednesday and Friday night games from the fledgling sports league during its eight-week regular season starting September 19 (CBS Sports Network replaces NBC Sports Network and AXS TV as national broadcasters of the UFL).
27	The 2012 Summer Olympics commence in London and continue through August 12, broadcasting domestically within the U.S. on NBC and certain other NBCUniversal-owned cable channels (including NBC Sports Network, Bravo, USA Network, Telemundo, MSNBC, and CNBC). The opening ceremonies for the London Games draw a record 40.7 million viewers stateside, beating the 39.7 million mark set during the 1996 Summer Olympics in Atlanta.
27	Jim Walton announces his resignation as president of CNN effective at the end of the year, after being employed with the network for over 30 years.
27	Tribune Broadcasting renews its affiliation agreement with Fox for six of seven Tribune-owned stations affiliated with the network in Seattle, Hartford, Indianapolis, Sacramento, Grand Rapids and Harrisburg (KSWB/San Diego is exempt from the renewal agreement as that station has a separate affiliation agreement with Fox).
27	Shield Media, owned by White Knight Broadcasting vice president Sheldon Galloway, announces its purchase of Fox affiliate WXXA/Albany from Newport Television for $19.2 million. Shield plans on entering into a shared services agreement with ABC affiliate WTEN (owned by Young Broadcasting).
27	Mark Steines steps down from his position as co-anchor of Entertainment Tonight after 17 years to host the revival of Home & Family on Hallmark Channel.

=== August ===
Date	Event
1	Al Jazeera launches Bein Sport One and Bein Sport Dos, two new sports channels dedicated to soccer, the former in English and the latter in Spanish.
1	The expiration of a carriage agreement for NFL Network and NFL RedZone results in the two channels being removed from Insight Communications systems in Ohio, Kentucky and Indiana, due to a long-running impasse between the National Football League and Insight parent company Time Warner Cable that has prevented a carriage agreement for the channels on TWC's existing systems and the prior removal of NFL Network from Adelphia systems acquired by TWC in 2006.
1	Subscription streaming television service FilmOn and the four major U.S. broadcast networks (ABC, NBC, CBS and Fox) reach a settlement in a 2010 lawsuit over the company's streaming of the networks' programming on the website. Each of the parties involved in the suit stipulated to a consent judgment and permanent injunction in the settlement, and FilmOn will pay $1.6 million each to the plaintiffs. The settlement bars FilmOn from streaming broadcast network programming.
2	American Spirit Media announces that it will acquire Fox affiliate WDBD/Jackson, Mississippi, and that it has donated MyNetworkTV affiliate WUFX/Vicksburg–Jackson, Mississippi, to Tougaloo College, to be operated by American Spirit Media through shared services and joint sales agreements with Raycom Media (owners of local NBC affiliate WLBT). The transactions, pending FCC approval, will take place at the end of the year.
4	The Buffalo-based syndicated movie series Off Beat Cinema airs its first episode on new flagship station WBBZ-TV, after 19 years airing from WKBW-TV. As part of the change, the series begins taping before a live studio audience.
6	Jason Vincent resigns as news director of Fox affiliate KQDS/Duluth amid controversy following a racially offensive comment that he had posted August 1 on Facebook, regarding a Native American man that he had discovered in his yard that evening, whom Vincent referred to in the post as a "drunk, homeless... animal".
7	Two stations in Milwaukee, both owned by Weigel Broadcasting, switch channel assignments. Independent station WMLW-CA moves to full-power UHF channel 49 to facilitate the station's upgrade to high definition broadcasts with a market-wide signal, while WBME-TV moves to the low-power channel 41 assignment of WMLW-CA, with an added relay on the DT2 subchannel of CBS-affiliated sister station WDJT-TV, due to WBME's main MeTV schedule broadcasting solely in standard definition and universal cable and near-full satellite carriage for both stations in the Milwaukee market negating the need for a full-power signal for WBME (the Bounce TV and Telemundo subchannels on channel 49 were unaffected). An official switch of call signs between the two stations occurred eleven days later.
8	Liberty Media announces plans to spin off its Liberty Starz subsidiary (which operates premium movie channels Starz, Encore and MoviePlex) into its own publicly traded company. The spinoff is expected to be completed by the end of 2012.
9	CNN suspends Fareed Zakaria and his program Fareed Zakaria GPS after it was revealed that Zakaria had plagiarized an article featured in the August 20 issue of Time on gun control from an article that was originally written by columnist Jill Lepore for the April 23 issue of The New Yorker. Zakaria, who has since apologized for his actions, was also suspended from Time for one month.
9	FilmOn founder Alki David launches a new streaming service using the domain Barrydriller.com that is similar to Aereo (for which the domain parodies the name of that company's founder Barry Diller, and which is currently in litigation with ABC, NBC, CBS and Fox in a separate lawsuit). The site streams network-affiliated stations via individual antennas and intends to pay retransmission fees to carry their programming. Fox filed a copyright infringement lawsuit against the site in a Los Angeles U.S. District Court on August 10, alleging that it is retransmitting broadcast network and syndicated programs owned by Fox without the company's permission. NBC, CBS and ABC followed with a joint copyright lawsuit on August 13.
12	Fond du Lac, Wisconsin, television station WWAZ-TV, a station owned by Pappas Telecasting Companies which has had a tenuous history of staying on the air since 2000 as a station unable to find a niche or popular network affiliation in either the Green Bay or Milwaukee markets, along with their parent company's financial struggles, returns to the air as WIWN, carrying programming as an affiliate of WeatherNation from a new tower in the Milwaukee tower site, with translator towers in the west part of their service area serving Columbus and Ripon.
13	MundoFox, which had an August 1 soft launch, makes its formal debut. The Spanish-language broadcast network is a partnership between Fox International Channels and Colombia's RCN TV.
13	Stainless Broadcasting Company (also known as Northwest Broadcasting) pulls its six stations (KAYU/Spokane, KMVU/Medford, Oregon, KFFX/Pendleton, Oregon, and its repeater KCYU-LD/Yakima, and WICZ–WBPN-LP/Binghamton) from DirecTV. The two companies had previously agreed on a specific carriage fee increase, though the deal fell apart due to a clause added by DirecTV requiring Stainless/Northwest Broadcasting to give a low rate equal to those the company previously signed with other satellite and cable providers. The dispute lasted nine weeks, ending on October 26.
13	VH1 pulls the launch of the reality series Ev and Ocho (originally planned to debut on September 3) indefinitely following the August 11 arrest of its star, NFL player Chad Johnson, on domestic battery charges on accusations that Johnson allegedly head-butted wife Evelyn Lozada during an argument.
13	The producers of The Good Wife has announced that Kristin Chenoweth, who was scheduled to play a reporter in a multiple storyline arc, will not be returning due to an accident on the set in which a gust of wind caused her to be struck by a piece of lighting equipment during the show's filming on July 11, resulting in the producers to alter her appearance to one episode. Chenoweth, who later treated for her injuries and released, said she needs time to recover before returning to work. However, Chenoweth later returned to the set on August 31.
15	Avoiding a 12:01 a.m. (ET) August 16 deadline, Dish Network reaches a retransmission agreement with Sinclair Broadcast Group, covering 70 Sinclair-owned or -operated stations in 45 markets.
15	The Pac-12 Conference launches the national sports channel Pac-12 Network as well as six regional sports networks. It is the first channel of its kind owned and operated entirely by a college conference, without the backing of a media conglomerate (unlike similar channels Big Ten Network, Longhorn Network and the defunct MountainWest Sports Network).
16	Cablevision signs an agreement with the National Football League to allow NFL Network and NFL Redzone to be carried on that company's systems for the first time (which further expands the reach of the two networks deeper into the New York City area as a result). The channels will be available on Cablevision systems starting on August 17. The agreement leaves Time Warner Cable as the only major pay television provider that does not carry either network.
17	Hours after the NFL Network deal was announced, Cablevision pulls four television stations owned by Tribune Broadcasting (WPIX/New York City, WCCT/Hartford, KWGN/Denver and WPHL/Philadelphia) from its systems in New York, New Jersey, Connecticut and Colorado. Cablevision accuses the broadcast group of demanding high retransmission consent fees for its stations due to its parent Tribune Company working to get out of bankruptcy and illegally bundling carriage agreements for WCCT's Fox-affiliated sister WTIC-TV to WPIX. WGN America across Cablevision's service area and WTIC-TV in its Connecticut service area were originally unaffected by the dispute, though both were also pulled by Cablevision on August 25. The dispute lasted 10 weeks, ending on October 26, when the affected channels returned to Cablevision systems.
17	NBCUniversal (which has been attempting to improve its financial performance since Comcast took majority ownership in 2011) imposes budget cutbacks for The Tonight Show (although the program is the highest-rated of the network late night talk shows), leading to the layoffs of about two dozen staff members (roughly 10% of the show's approximately 200 person staff), the program's weekly budget being reduced by 25% to $1.7 million, and host Jay Leno's annual salary from being cut from $25–$30 million to around $20 million (the show was operating under the same increased weekly budget prior to the budget cuts as that during Leno's stint as host of the short-lived The Jay Leno Show in 2009).
20	New York City-based hedge fund Standard General files an application with the Federal Communications Commission to approve an increase of its ownership stake in the 11-station Young Broadcasting group (which emerged from Chapter 11 bankruptcy protection in 2010) from 36.34% to a majority stake of 50.03%.
21	ABC announces changes to its late night lineup that will take effect in January 2013: the network's long-running newsmagazine Nightline will leave the 11:35 p.m. (ET) timeslot that the program has held since it debuted in March 1980 (being bumped one hour later to 12:35 a.m. ET), while talk show Jimmy Kimmel Live! will move up 25 minutes to the 11:35 slot (which places it in direct competition with fellow late night talkers The Tonight Show, Late Show with David Letterman, The Colbert Report and Conan).
22	Watchdog group Citizens for Responsibility and Ethics in Washington files a petition to the Federal Communications Commission asking them to deny the pending license renewals of three stations owned by Fox Television Stations (the Washington, D.C., duopoly of WTTG–WDCA and Baltimore station WUTB) citing the phone hacking scandal involving British newspapers owned by FTS parent News Corporation.
23	Nexstar Broadcasting Group announces the sale of Fox affiliate KBTV-TV/Beaumont to Deerfield Media. Sinclair Broadcast Group (owners of CBS affiliate KFDM) will operate KBTV under a shared services agreement, identical to pending operational agreements between Sinclair and Deerfield (which will operate in a relatively similar capacity with Sinclair as Cunningham Broadcasting) in Mobile (two stations), Cincinnati and San Antonio.
24	NBC affiliate KSL-TV/Salt Lake City announced that it will not carry the sitcom The New Normal because of its premise involving a gay couple trying to have a family, which the station's parent company Bonneville International (which in turn is owned by the LDS Church, which opposes gay marriage) sees as being too controversial, offensive, and not reflecting the station's conservative program policies, with the GM stating that "For our brand, this program feels inappropriate on several dimensions, especially during family viewing time", the latter referring to the Tuesday night 8:30 pm (MT) slot and its decision in 2011 to not carry The Playboy Club. As with some NBC programs that KSL refuses to air, the series will be seen on CW affiliate KUCW instead.
25	Saban Brands, via Kidsco Media Ventures, began programming The CW's children's programming block, Toonzai, which was relaunched under the name Vortexx. Programming aired on the block includes Yu-Gi-Oh! and Power Rangers. The former Toonzai block ended its four-year run on The CW (dating back its existence under its former branding as TheCW4Kids) on August 18.
28	ESPN renews its broadcast rights to Major League Baseball Spring training and Sunday, Monday and Wednesday evening regular season games for eight years through 2021 (as well as retaining highlight program Baseball Tonight). The $5.6 billion deal (averaging $700 million annually) is nearly double the $2.8 billion that ESPN paid under the previous contract and includes added rights to show games joined in progress, a 13% increase in the number of live games shown and the virtual elimination of home market blackouts for Monday and Wednesday games. Though rights to a single Wild Card game each season are included, all other playoff games are exempt from the deal (rights to the post-season games are held by Fox and TBS though the 2013 season).
31	ABC affiliate WKDH/Houston, Mississippi (owned by Southern Broadcasting under a local marketing agreement with WTVA, Inc., owners of NBC affiliate WTVA/Tupelo) ceases operations after 11 years. The ABC affiliation for the Tupelo-Columbus market moved to the second digital subchannel of WTVA on September 1, bumping MeTV programming seen on that channel to sister station WLOV-TV's second digital subchannel.
31	Ohio News Network, a Columbus-based regional cable news channel owned by Dispatch Broadcast Group, ceases operations after 15 years.

=== September ===
Date	Event
1	Dish Network pulls Dispatch Broadcast Group's two television stations, NBC affiliate WTHR/Indianapolis and CBS affiliate WBNS-TV/Columbus, due to a retransmission consent dispute with the satellite provider. The dispute ended on October 5, when Dispatch and Dish struck a new carriage agreement.
1	At the same time, Dish Network reaches a short-term carriage agreement with Big Ten Network to keep the cable channel devoted to sports events from the Big Ten Conference on the satellite provider until a longer-term contract is agreed upon.
2	One year after being shortened from 21 1/2 to six hours, the MDA Labor Day Telethon is revamped again, paring down to three pre-recorded primetime hours and retitled MDA Show of Strength in an effort to move away from its 46-year heritage as a long-form telethon.
3	Gray Television launches two low-power network affiliates in Parkersburg, West Virginia (the first of four LPTV licenses that Gray acquired in March and April to sign on the air): WIYE-LD debuts as the area's CBS affiliate, while WOVA-LD assumes the Fox affiliation from the second digital subchannel of NBC-affiliated sister station WTAP-TV. WIYE-LD replaces WBNS/Columbus as the default CBS affiliate on cable and satellite providers within the market.
4	Journal Communications purchases CBS affiliate WTVF/Nashville from Landmark Media Enterprises for $215 million. Once the sale of the station is completed, it will leave fellow CBS station KLAS-TV/Las Vegas as the only remaining television station in Landmark's portfolio.
4	Live! with Kelly becomes Live! with Kelly and Michael, as former New York Giants defensive end Michael Strahan is formally introduced as Kelly Ripa's new co-host. Strahan will continue his duties as analyst for the Fox NFL Sunday pregame show, which originates from Los Angeles (Live! is based at New York City's WABC-TV).
4	E! names former 106 & Park co-host Terrence Jenkins to replace Ryan Seacrest as co-host of the network's flagship entertainment news program E! News. Seacrest's departure from his co-hosting duties on E! News is part of the terms of a two-year agreement that he signed with E! parent NBCUniversal in April that will have him become a contributor for NBC, though Seacrest will move to a contributor role on the program, while retaining his position as the show's managing editor and serving as co-host of the network's Live From the Red Carpet specials.
4	Epix strikes a distribution agreement with Amazon that will provide the website's Amazon Video service with film content from the parent companies of the fledgling premium cable channel: Paramount Pictures (whose corporate parent Viacom jointly operates the channel), Metro-Goldwyn-Mayer and Lionsgate. Films will appear on Amazon Video on a 90-day delay after their pay cable premiere on Epix (Netflix will also retain rights to Epix film content as part of an existing five-year deal that began in 2010, though it will no longer hold exclusivity).
4	Red Zone Capital Management, an investment firm owned by Daniel Snyder, agrees to sell (for an undisclosed amount) TV production firm Dick Clark Productions to a partnership headed by Guggenheim Partners, Mandalay Entertainment and Mosaic Media Investment Partners.
5	CBS Corporation signs a retransmission consent agreement with Cablevision, allowing continued carriage of three CBS-owned television stations in the cable provider's New York, New Jersey and Colorado service areas (WCBS-TV/New York, KYW-TV/Philadelphia and KCNC-TV/Denver), as well as Showtime, Smithsonian Channel and CBS Sports Network.
5	The transmitter tower of PBS member station KSMQ-TV/Austin, Minnesota, collapses due to straight-line thunderstorm winds that moved through the area during the early morning hours, knocking the station off the air for several hours. The station set up alternate transmitter facilities that evening utilizing a microwave dish installed atop the station's studios that was manually directed towards a backup tower near Grand Meadow. The station later set up a fund to help cover insurance deductible costs (estimated at $7,000 minimum), though insurance is expected to cover the costs for the construction of a new transmitter.
6	Google Fiber enters into a carriage agreement with the National Football League to carry the NFL Network and NFL RedZone upon the September 10 launch of the service in the Kansas City metropolitan area.
6	Optimum rebrands for the first time in ten years with a new logo.
7	ESPN renews its agreement to broadcast college football, basketball and baseball games from the Big 12 Conference through the 2024–25 athletics season. The deal, which encompasses ESPN's cable channels and ABC, is reported to be worth an estimated $1.3 billion and increases the number of televised regular season games starting with the 2016 season.
7	News-Press & Gazette Company enters into an agreement to purchase ABC affiliate KEYT-TV/Santa Barbara from Smith Media (which is expected to be completed by the end of 2012, pending FCC approval). The sale price for the station is $14.3 million.
10	Nexstar Broadcasting Group renews affiliation contracts for nine of its 11 CBS-affiliated stations for six years. The agreement, which runs through 2018, exempts WTAJ-TV/Altoona (which will remain with CBS through at least June 2016) and Nexstar-operated WYOU/Scranton (which is owned by Mission Broadcasting, and will remain with CBS through at least June 2015) due to separate existing affiliation agreements.
10	ABC affiliate KSFY-TV/Sioux Falls, South Dakota (owned by Hoak Media) will begin carrying CW network programming via a new second digital subchannel.
10	ACME Communications announces it will sell its last remaining stations — the Albuquerque duopoly of CW affiliate KWBQ, its Roswell satellite KRWB, and MyNetworkTV affiliate KASY-TV; the buyer is Tamer Media, who will purchase the stations in a $17.3 million all-cash transaction in its first TV station acquisition. The stations will continue to be operated by LIN Media stations KASA-TV (Fox) and KRQE (CBS) via shared services agreements.
10	Professional wrestling commentator Jerry Lawler collapses and is sent to a Montreal hospital during a live broadcast of WWE Monday Night Raw. Lawler's partner, Michael Cole, announces the incident "is not part of (the evening's) entertainment" and there is no further commentary during the matches for the first time in the show's 19-year history.
11	Today causes controversy after the NBC morning program continues on with an interview with Keeping Up with the Kardashians co-star Kris Jenner instead of airing the remembrance ceremonies for the September 11 attacks, when a moment of silence was conducted at 8:46 a.m. ET (the time that American Airlines Flight 11 crashed into the North Tower of the World Trade Center) in memory of those who died in the attacks. Though Today did not broadcast the tribute on NBC's national feed, WNBC/New York City interrupted the program to broadcast locally produced special coverage of the ceremonies. Though the network will not issue a public apology, NBC News president Steve Capus sent a memo on September 12 to managers at all of NBC's affiliates apologizing for criticism the stations have faced.
12	Actress/singer Jennifer Lopez acquires a minority ownership interest in Nuvo TV. As part of the deal, Lopez's production company Nuyorican Productions will develop series for the channel, which is aimed at an English-speaking Latino-American audience.
13	Beef Products Inc. files a defamation lawsuit against ABC News (with ABC World News anchor Diane Sawyer and correspondents Jim Avila and David Kerley among those named as defendants), seeking $1.2 billion in damages for claims of roughly 200 "false, misleading and defamatory" statements. The suit alleges that the network's March 2012 investigation on ammonia-treated lean, textured ground beef trimmings misled consumers to believing that the product (nicknamed "pink slime") is unsafe for consumption, resulting in an impact to the company that forced the closure of three of its four U.S. processing plants and the layoffs of more than 650 employees.
13	DirecTV drops GOL TV after the channel loses U.S. broadcast rights to Spain's La Liga soccer league (which are now held by Al Jazeera-owned beIN Sport).
15	Dish Network drops Big Ten Network from the satellite provider due to the two parties' inability to settle on a new carriage agreement (this after Dish and BTN reached a temporary extension of their previous agreement on September 1 to allow subscribers to view college football games during the first two weeks of the NCAA football season). Dish reached a new long-term carriage agreement with the network one week later, restoring the channel on September 22.
16	American Idol announces Nicki Minaj and Keith Urban are the two newest members of its judging panel. Minaj and Urban will join fellow new judge Mariah Carey, who joined the show on July 23, and Randy Jackson, who had announced his intentions to leave the panel on August 31 but will instead continue not only as judge but also add duties as contestant mentor.
19	Fox Sports and TBS renew their broadcast contracts with Major League Baseball to continue broadcasting MLB games through 2021. Fox will pay approximately $500 million annually to broadcast MLB games, while TBS will pay around $300 million. The deal removes TBS' exclusivity for carriage of all first-round MLB playoff games, as Fox will obtain rights to some first-round games to air on its cable motorsports channel Speed, which is rumored to undergo a revamp of programming.
20	NRJ TV purchases family-oriented independent station WGCB-TV/Red Lion, Pennsylvania, for $9 million from Red Lion Television.
20	HBO announces that CEO Bill Nelson will retire at the end of 2012, after nearly three decades with the pay cable service. Nelson will be succeeded by network co-president Richard Plepler.
21	Time Warner Cable reaches an agreement with the National Football League to carry the NFL Network and NFL RedZone on its systems (as well as those owned by co-managed Bright House Networks). TWC was the largest cable television provider in the United States that did not carry either channel (and the last remaining major pay TV provider not to carry them as Cablevision reached an agreement with the network on August 16).
23	ABC hosts the 64th Primetime Emmy Awards, hosted by Jimmy Kimmel. This event, which was telecast live in all time zones, also marked the first time in its 64-year history that the four major over-the-air broadcast networks did not receive any nominations in three of the five main categories: Outstanding Drama Series, Outstanding Supporting Actor in a Drama Series and Outstanding Actor in a Drama Series.
24	Gray Television signs on low-power WECP-LD/Panama City, Florida, to serve as the CBS affiliate for the market. The station replaces WTVY/Dothan, Alabama, as the de facto affiliate for the Panama City area (a designation WTVY held due to that station's city-grade signal coverage in Panama City proper).
24	Willie Geist is named co-host of the 9 a.m. hour of NBC's Today, replacing now-7 to 9 a.m. co-host Savannah Guthrie. Geist will reduce his duties at MSNBC as a result: stepping down as host of the cable news channel's morning program Way Too Early, and continuing to appear on Morning Joe in a reduced capacity.
24	ESPN's SportsCenter records a 5.0 overnight Nielsen rating leading out of a controversial ending to the Monday Night Football telecast between the Green Bay Packers and Seattle Seahawks. The rating is the highest for the sports news program in its 33-year history.
27	Bayou City Broadcasting announces the sale of its eight stations (Fox affiliates KXVA/Abilene and KIDY/San Angelo, Texas, MyNetworkTV affiliate KIDZ-CD/Abilene and four other low-power stations) to London Broadcasting Company (the sale price was initially undisclosed). The sale marks a temporary exit from the broadcasting industry for the company's owner DuJuan McCoy, who plans on acquiring network-affiliated stations in mid-sized markets larger than San Angelo and Abilene.
27	Fox Sports Net announces its Southern California affiliates Fox Sports West, Prime Ticket and Fox Sports San Diego have reached a new long term carriage deal to exclusively broadcast Big West Conference college sports.
28	During coverage of a police pursuit that started with 33-year-old Jodon Romero carjacking a vehicle in Phoenix, ending near I-10 outside Salome, Arizona, Fox News Channel inadvertently broadcasts Romero's suicide from a handgun shot to the head. Studio B anchor Shepard Smith issued an on-air apology minutes later for the broadcast delay error made by FNC's master control that led to the suicide being shown live on-air (through a helicopter feed from Fox-owned Phoenix station KSAZ-TV).

=== October ===
Date	Event
1	Time Warner Cable launches two Los Angeles-based regional sports networks, TWC SportsNet and TWC Deportes. The networks serve as exclusive homes to the NBA's Los Angeles Lakers. TWC Deportes broadcasts in Spanish, the first RSN to do so. Time Warner Cable SportsNet later announces that it will provide Korean language audio of Los Angeles Lakers games via secondary audio programming beginning with the 2012–13 regular season, becoming the first English-language television network to offer play-by-play of sporting events in an Asian dialect.
1	Comcast SportsNet Houston, the newest affiliate of Comcast SportsNet, co-owned by the Houston Astros, Houston Rockets, and NBCUniversal, launches. As a result, the teams' previous rights owner Fox Sports Houston was shut down four days later.
2	CBS affiliate WKBT/La Crosse, Wisconsin, makes headlines when morning news anchor Jennifer Livingston responds to an e-mail sent to her by a viewer about her weight, who she later criticizes on air after she perceived the e-mail as bullying and calls the viewer out for making the statement. Livingston later received an apology from the viewer for the message.
3	Gray Television signs on low-power CBS affiliate WSVF-LD/Harrisonburg, Virginia. Harrisonburg was previously unserved by an in-market CBS affiliate with WUSA/Washington, D.C., available as a default affiliate on cable and satellite.
3	The first 2012 United States presidential debate is aired from the University of Denver.
4	Cablevision and The Walt Disney Company reach an agreement to continue distribution of Disney-owned cable channels across Cablevision system footprint and ABC stations WABC and WPVI in the respective New York City and Philadelphia markets. The deal includes carriage of the planned ABC News/Univision news channel (set to launch in 2013), online service ESPN3, 3DTV channel ESPN 3D, expanded video-on-demand offerings and the ability for customers to view live streams of ESPN, Disney Channel, Disney XD and Disney Junior programming online, on tablet computers and mobile devices through authentication apps (with apps for ABC and ABC Family forthcoming).
8	Narrowly averting a blackout, Gannett Company reaches a long-term carriage agreement with Dish Network for all 23 of its television stations to remain on the satellite provider. The deal was reached despite reported contentious demands made by Gannett for Dish to disable its controversial AutoHop ad-skipping feature (which is currently involved in a separate copyright infringement lawsuit) on its digital video recorders or pay a "massive penalty" of a 300% increase in carriage fees (claims that Gannett publicly denied).
9	Viacom strikes a deal to add programming from two additional networks to Hulu: the Hulu Plus subscription service adds current season episodes of Nickelodeon's original programming with the five most recent episodes available, and new episodes added 21 days after their original airdate (in addition to being the first U.S.-based children's network and Viacom's fifth cable channel whose program content is available on Hulu, it is Nickelodeon's second streaming deal as the channel's programming is available on Netflix). Programming from Spanish-language network Tr3s will also become available on its Hulu Latino service.
9	Bay Area journalist Belva Davis retires after 19 years as host of local program, This Week in Northern California, on KQED 9/San Francisco and KQEH 54/San Jose.
11	DirecTV announces the release of the Genie digital video recorder, which among its features allows the simultaneous recording of up to five TV shows on up to 8 connectable TV sets, client boxes, gaming or Blu-ray consoles from a single receiver (with recording storage of up to 200 hours of high definition and 800 hours of standard definition programs); recommends shows based on past TV viewing habits; timer-records shows up to two weeks in advance and the ability to view a show's 5 most recent episodes.
11	The 2012 vice presidential debate is aired at Centre College with ABC's Martha Raddatz moderating.
12	After a 17-year run, Fox Sports announces that Speed will no longer air Formula One racing events after the 2012–13 season due to Speed being outbid for the U.S. broadcast rights. While no word has been made on where Formula One telecasts will land domestically, it is expected that the rights will migrate to NBC Sports Network in 2013, as they were the high bidder.
12	The Federal Communications Commission votes to end a law banning cable providers from encrypting the signals of basic cable channels, effectively closing a loophole that lets many households watch basic cable channels for free. The move is cited as a way to reduce cable theft and reduce the number of visits by cable technicians to disconnect television service.
12	Retirement Living TV enters into a carriage agreement that will allow the channel (which is aimed at adults age 50+) to be available on Time Warner Cable and co-managed Bright House Networks systems. Both cable providers will carry the channel as part of their digital cable tiers by the end of 2012.
14	Providence Equity Partners divests its 10% ownership stake in the streaming website Hulu to site co-owners News Corporation, Comcast and The Walt Disney Company for $200 million.
15	NASCAR and Fox Sports announce an eight-year multiplatform agreement that will retain Fox's broadcast rights to NASCAR racing events through 2022. The agreement will retains all existing event telecast rights, but gives Fox rights to live stream all races, as well as highlights and pre- and post-race coverage to customers of participating cable and satellite providers online and through mobile devices starting in 2013.
15	A Tennessee U.S. District Court dismisses a racial discrimination lawsuit against Warner Horizon Television and producers of ABC's The Bachelor and The Bachelorette, citing that casting contestants for the shows for whatever reason is protected by the First Amendment. Filed in April by rejected applicants Nathaniel Claybrooks and Christopher Johnson (both African-American), the suit noted the lack of minority contestants and the complete absence of non-white Bachelors and Bachelorettes in the 24 cumulative cycles of both series, believing that the producers have done so to avoid potential controversy from anyone opposed to interracial relationships.
15	Shield Media purchases ABC affiliate WLAJ/Lansing, Michigan, from Sinclair Broadcast Group for $14.4 million. Under the terms of the sale agreement, WLAJ's operations will be turned over to Young Broadcasting under a shared services agreement, creating a virtual triopoly with CBS affiliate WLNS-TV (which Young owns outright) and MyNetworkTV affiliate WHTV (operated through a joint sales agreement with Venture Technologies Group).
15	Wichita, Kansas, native Tamara Feldman reprises her role as Poppy Lifton in the Gossip Girl episode High Infidelity, her first one since The Wrath of Con, which aired May 4, 2009 on The CW.
16	Candy Crowley of CNN moderates the second 2012 presidential debate at Hofstra University between President Obama and former Massachusetts Governor Mitt Romney. Romney's line about "binders full of women" and Obama's "please proceed, Governor" garner significant attention.
21	With Dish Network's attempt to win their trial against AMC Networks over removal of the Voom HD Networks suite falling apart, Dish Network settles out of court with AMC for $700 million and video and data spectrum rights in several major markets, and signs a long-term carriage agreement with AMC Networks. AMC returns on the same day (in concert with the season three premiere a week before of The Walking Dead), with the remainder of AMC's networks to return November 1.
22	The Federal Communications Commission denies a request filed by Oceanic Time Warner Cable and Hawaiian Telcom that would have declined My Family TV affiliate KLEI-TV/Kailua-Kona, Hawaii, carriage on both systems. The decision resulted from a must-carry complaint filed by Mauna Kea Broadcasting Company, Inc. (which purchased KLEI in 2011), after being rebuffed by both companies for carriage of the station.
22	Roberts Broadcasting sells CW affiliate WRBJ/Jackson, Mississippi, to the Trinity Broadcasting Network. The station, which signed on in 2006, will replace its secular programming with TBN's religious programs after the sale closes. It is unclear as to who will pick up the CW affiliation in Jackson after the sale.
22	The final 2012 presidential debate is aired from Lynn University with CBS's Bob Schieffer moderating.
23	CBS Television Distribution announces that it will rename its syndicated entertainment news program The Insider as omg! Insider in January 2013, through a partnership with Yahoo!'s celebrity news and gossip website omg!. The rebranded program will retain hosts Kevin Frazier and Brooke Anderson, but will also feature talent and entertainment columnists from Yahoo! as contributors.
23	Rural Media Group (owners of RFD-TV and Rural TV) announces the purchase of FamilyNet from Interactive Television and Gaming Networks. Under the deal, Rural TV (which launched in the United States in February 2012) will merge its programming fully with the FamilyNet schedule starting on January 1, 2013, though weekend preview programming featuring Rural TV content will already premiere as of October 27.
24	The CW signs its first video-on-demand carriage agreement with a pay television provider through a deal with Comcast. The deal allows customers to watch the four most-recent episodes of the network's primetime shows on Comcast's Xfinity On Demand service, with new episodes available the day after their original airdate. The CW On Demand, which is accessible to subscribers at no additional charge, debuted on Comcast systems nationwide on October 25.
24	NBCUniversal announces that it will revamp its NBC Nonstop news-and-lifestyle multicast network into Cozi TV on January 1, 2013, which will combine original programs both produced solely for its local affiliates and those produced to air nationally on the network, with classic TV shows and movies from the company's library.
25	Ratings-challenged cable news channel Current TV, started in 2005 by Al Gore and Joel Hyatt, puts itself up for sale.
25	Columbus, Ohio's ESPN Radio affiliate WBNS-FM (which is also the home station for Ohio State Buckeyes football) terminates their morning host Scott Torgerson after he made a tweet on October 13 that he wished that ESPN personality Desmond Howard would "get fired or die" so he can watch College GameDay again. The comments, which later went viral and resulted in a condemnation from Desmond's on-air colleague and former Ohio State quarterback Kirk Herbstreit on the station, resulted in WBNS suspending Torgerson on October 17.
26	Cablevision and Tribune Broadcasting agree to a new retransmission consent agreement over two months after stations in Cablevision's service area were pulled. WPIX's primetime news audience had fallen by nearly two-fifths due to the dispute.
28	NBCUniversal gains the U.S. broadcast rights to English Premier League in a three-year deal (lasting until 2016) that will cost $80 million per year to televise the soccer league's games on NBC, NBC Sports Network and possibly on some of the company's other cable outlets (such as Bravo and USA Network).
29	NBC announces that struggling sophomore sitcom Up All Night will transition from a single-camera to a multi-camera format filmed in front of a live studio audience. The show is expected to make the transition following a three-month production hiatus after filming of the second season's 11th episode, with episodes to air in the new format in Spring 2013.
29	Univision signs a 10-year deal for Spanish and Portuguese language rights to CONCACAF coverage.
29	In the wake of Hurricane Sandy affecting the Eastern United States, ABC, CBS and The CW and NBC all alter their schedules to bring complete coverage of the storm.
31	Fox Sports New Orleans, the newest affiliate of Fox Sports Net launches becoming the new exclusive home of the NBA's New Orleans Hornets.

=== November ===
Date	Event
1	Luken Communications (in a joint venture with Jim Owens Entertainment) relaunched The Nashville Network as an over-the-air digital multicast network, resurrecting the brand and country music-oriented format of the old cable network that existed from 1983 to 2000 (a general entertainment channel now known as Spike).
2	NBC and a large number of its affiliate channels broadcast Hurricane Sandy: Coming Together, a telethon to benefit relief efforts in the wake of Superstorm Sandy.
2	Time Warner Cable inks a deal to carry beIN Sport and beIN Sport en Español on both its flagship service and on its co-managed Bright House Networks cable systems. Both networks will also be viewable to authenticated subscribers through TWC's and beIN's website and mobile applications as well as on Bright House's streaming app. Availability of both channels will vary depending on market.
4	Nexstar Broadcasting Group acquires CBS affiliate KGPE/Fresno and the Bakersfield duopoly of NBC affiliate KGET and Telemundo affiliate KKEY-LP from Newport Television for $35.4 million (the deal is separate from its acquisition of 10 Newport-owned stations on July 19). Under a separate deal, Nexstar also acquires the Burlington, Vermont, virtual duopoly of Fox affiliate WFFF-TV and ABC affiliate WVNY from Smith Media for $17.1 million (Mission Broadcasting subsidiary will operate WVNY under a shared services agreement upon the sale's closure).
4	NBCUniversal expands rights to on-demand content through a carriage renewal with Cablevision, that will allow the cable provider's subscribers access to live streams of NBCUniversal's cable and broadcast networks online and across mobile platforms for the first time.
4	CBS Corporation, long a holdout from entering into content agreements with streaming services, strikes a non-exclusive, multi-year licensing agreement that will allow programs owned by the company to be streamed on the Hulu Plus subscription service. Programs made available on the site will come from CBS Television Distribution's library of 2,600 shows, generally consisting of series no longer in first-run broadcast.
8	A preliminary injunction request filed by Fox against Dish Network's AutoHop digital video recorder is rejected in a Los Angeles U.S. District Court on grounds that Fox was unlikely to be able to prove that it suffered irreparable harm from the technology that allows subscribers to skip over commercial advertisements.
9	Denali Media Holdings (a subsidiary of General Communication, Inc.) purchases three television stations in Alaska: CBS affiliate KTVA/Anchorage from Alaska Broadcasting Co./Media News Group, and NBC affiliate KATH-LD/Juneau and its Sitka translator KSCT-LP from North Star Broadcasting.
9	Lockwood Broadcast Group purchases WMAK/Knoxville, Tennessee, from Daystar Television Network subsidiary Word of God Fellowship for $2.95 million. The sale will create a duopoly (the first in the Knoxville television market) with CW affiliate WBXX-TV. If the FCC approves the sale, WMAK's callsign will be changed to WKNX and the station will likely drop Daystar programming to become a commercial outlet.
13	CBS Sports Network enters into a two-year broadcast rights agreement with the Arena Football League (assuming rights from the NFL Network), in which the channel will carry 19 regular season (including the league's Saturday night game of the week) and two playoff games starting with the AFL's 2013 season, and will allow sister broadcast network CBS to carry the ArenaBowl championship game.
15	Actress Lisa Whelchel, who is currently competing in Survivor: Philippines, reveals that she has contracted the West Nile virus, although she did not reveal if it happened before appearing on or during the show.
15	United States Vice President Joe Biden makes history as the first sitting US vice president to appear in an acting role on an American television series, playing himself in a cameo of the Parks and Recreation Season 5 episode "Leslie Vs. April", in which Ben Wyatt (played by Adam Scott) surprises fiancée Leslie Knope (played by Amy Poehler) with a gift to meet Biden, whom Leslie cited as her top favorite she wanted to meet on her "Celebrity Sex List."
18	Disney Channel premiered the pilot film for the Disney Junior series Sofia the First, Once Upon a Princess, which received 5.151 million viewers.
20	Elmo puppeteer Kevin Clash resigns from Sesame Street amid allegations of sexually abusing underage boys.
20	The main anchor team for Bangor, Maine's ABC affiliate WVII-TV and sister Fox station WFVX-LP, both owned by Rockfleet Broadcasting, both resign on-air at the end of the day's 6 pm newscast. Cindy Michaels, who was also the station's news director, and Tony Consiglio cited conflicts with both the upper management at the station itself and with Rockfleet, along with treatment of the staff in deciding to leave the station.
20	News Corporation purchases a 49% stake in YES Network, the cable TV home of the New York Yankees and the Brooklyn Nets.
21	After what he cites as a rocky relationship on and off the set with the production crew and staff, Chevy Chase has announced that he will leave Community before the end of the fourth season, appearing in only 11 of the shortened 13 episode order.
21	Gray Television, the owners of KOLN/Lincoln, Nebraska, will acquire KSNB/Superior from Colins Broadcasting, for $1.25 million and is seeking a 'failed station waiver', which will allow the acquisition to occur.
22	Top 40/CHR WDCG/Raleigh-Durham (owned by Clear Channel Communications) issues an apology to the city of Raleigh, its mayor Nancy McFarlane, the Greater Raleigh Merchants Association and CBS affiliate WRAL after a float featuring an African American man dressed as an angel hanging from a Christmas tree sponsored by WDCG was featured in WRAL's telecast of their annual Christmas Parade on November 17. The float, which also featured WDCG morning stars Bob and the Showgram, was blasted by officials and parade goers as a depiction of a lynching, and as a result of this incident the producer of WDCG's morning show, who did not approve of the float's concept, was terminated. WRAL GM Jennifer Martin has been assured that WDCG will not allow any more displays that could be seen as racially offensive in future events sponsored by WRAL.
26	It is reported Fox Sports will rebrand Speed as Fox Sports 1 in August 2013 as a competitor to ESPN.
26	Roberts Media acquires NBC affiliate KMTR/Eugene and its satellite stations from Newport Television for $8.5 million. Fisher Communications, which also owns KVAL-TV in the market, will operate KMTR under a shared services agreement upon the sale's closure.
29	Former NBCUniversal CEO and Katie producer Jeff Zucker is named President/CEO at CNN, replacing Jim Walton, who left in January 2013.
29	Fox Television Stations has agreed to sell its MyNetworkTV station, WUTB/Baltimore to Deerfield Media for $2.7 million. Sinclair Broadcast Group (which owns Fox affiliate WBFF) will operate the station through a local marketing agreement (Sinclair also operates CW affiliate WNUV, owned by Cunningham Broadcasting).
30	Avoiding a Midnight deadline, Gannett Company has reached a retransmission consent agreement with DirecTV to air its 23 television stations on its satellite carrier.

=== December ===
Date	Event
1	The TV Parental Guidelines (in use since January 1997) expand further onto the Internet as ABC, NBC, CBS, Fox, Univision, Telemundo and Telefutura begin providing content rating information on all full-length programs, except for news, that are streamed online (content rating information is already provided during streaming program content from NBC, ABC, and Fox on their respective websites as well as Hulu and Netflix).
3	Sinclair Broadcast Group announced it will acquire WHAM/Rochester, New York, from Newport Television for $54 million. This announcement comes after Sinclair, Nexstar and Cox completed the July acquisitions of the Newport stations.
4	The 2012 Victoria's Secret Fashion Show is broadcast on CBS. 9.48 million people tune in.
7	The 2012 Spike Video Game Awards are aired on Spike TV.
9	The Fabulous Beekman Boys lead actors Josh Kilmer-Purcell and Brent Ridge won the 21st installment of The Amazing Race. Prior to the season, The Fabulous Beekman Boys was announced to be renewed by Cooking Channel after its initial cancellation on April earlier this year.
10	Univision Communications signs an agreement to carry Bounce TV as a digital multicast channel on its stations in San Francisco, Boston, Tampa, Miami, Denver, Sacramento and Raleigh.
10	In anticipation of its 50th anniversary, Comcast adopts the NBC Peacock logo, last used at NBCUniversal in 2011, as its new corporate logo, which is in a new font and without its classic crescent C.
11	In response to the death of Larry Hagman, the producers of Dallas announce that J.R. Ewing will be killed off in the revival's second season instead of replaced by a different actor.
12	The Viewability Rule, in effect since 2007 and which requires hybrid, analog-digital cable systems to offer viewers TV broadcast signals in an analog format so that viewers with old analog sets can continue to receive them under the "must-carry" guidelines, ends after failing to reach a vote on a three-month extension. Since the rule is gone, viewers with analog TV sets may need a set-top box to continue to receive the stations.
12	12-12-12: The Concert for Sandy Relief aired on 39 channels.
13	The FCC begins enforcement of the Commercial Advertisement Loudness Mitigation Act (or "CALM Act"), passed by Congress and signed into law by President Barack Obama in 2010, which requires broadcasters and cable operators to ensure the volume level of a commercial is consistent with that of the program it appears on.
13	Fox affiliate WUPW/Toledo disappears from Buckeye CableSystem as the result of an ongoing legal dispute between the station's owner American Spirit Media, Raycom Media (owner of WUPW's CBS-affiliated SSA partner WTOL) and Buckeye over allegations that the two station owners wanted a rate increase from the cable provider to continue carriage of WUPW's signal.
14	Due to the school shooting in Newtown, Connecticut, Syfy pulls an episode of Haven scheduled to air that night because it involved a high school shooting. Fox also pulled that week's episodes of Family Guy and American Dad!, to "avoid potentially sensitive content". NBC also pulled the plug on a repeat of Blake Shelton's not so family Christmas due to a scene where Shelton and Larry The Cable Guy kills characters from Rudolph the Red-Nosed Reindeer, which Rival CBS aired that night (and won the Nielsen ratings), at the last minute and airs Home for the Holidays with Michael Bublé instead.
18	The A.C. Nielsen Co. announces that they will acquire Arbitron, bringing together two of America's largest rating services. The deal, which has been approved by the boards of both companies, is subject to customary closing conditions, including regulatory review.
20	NBCUniversal Television Distribution launches a new retro subchannel network called Cozi TV on NBC's owned-and-operated stations, replacing NBC Nonstop. The network will also be offered to other stations outside the NBC O&O group starting in 2013.
20	Gray Television, the owners of WTVY/Dothan, Alabama, will acquire low-power station, WDON-LP from New Moon Communications, for $60,000.
20	Tate Stevens wins the second season of The X Factor, with Carly Rose Sonenclar named as runner-up. Fifth Harmony, one of the most successful girl groups in the series, finished third.
25	The Washington Metropolitan Police Department announces that an investigation will be conducted into whether NBC News correspondent David Gregory violated Washington, D.C., gun laws when he displayed what he described as a 30-round magazine as part of a December 23 Meet the Press interview with National Rifle Association president Wayne LaPierre. Under D.C. law, possessing a large capacity ammunition device (such as a magazine) within the city is illegal if the device holds more than 10 rounds of ammunition and also specifies the large devices are illegal regardless of whether or not they're attached to a firearm. The reason behind this investigation is due to NBC having a news office and an O&O (WRC-TV) inside the D.C. city limits, which also houses the studios of Meet The Press.
28	Fox Sports Networks acquires SportsTime Ohio from Larry Dolan. The move gives Fox Sports Ohio the exclusive broadcast rights to Cleveland Indians baseball, Cleveland Browns football, Ohio High School Athletic Association football and basketball playoffs and championships, and Mid-American Conference events.
31	After four years, the Tribune Company, owners of WGN-TV/Chicago and WPIX/New York, among other media properties, emerges from chapter 11 bankruptcy protection.
31	Time Warner Cable and Bright House Networks (which negotiates alongside TWC) drop Ovation from their systems upon the expiration of its carriage agreement with the cable provider. The removal is the result of Time Warner Cable and Bright House Networks' decisions to discontinue carriage of lower-rated cable channels in an attempt to help lower monthly rates for its subscribers.
31	Charter Communications and The Walt Disney Company announce a long-term distribution agreement for the majority of their networks and ABC O&O stations, including the addition of WatchESPN rights, Disney Junior, ESPN Buzzer Beater/Goal Line, the Longhorn Network and the upcoming ABC/Univision cable news channel for Charter customers.
31	Comcast and NBC announce a long-term carriage agreement for their cable networks and owned NBC and Telemundo stations with the National Cable Television Cooperative representing the nation's smaller cable companies.
31	ABC airs Dick Clark's New Year's Rockin' Eve for the first time since Dick Clark's death earlier this year. The annual program, which continued into January 1, began with a two-hour primetime retrospective to Clark, who had hosted the program since its inception in 1972, featuring archive performances from past years and from American Bandstand. Ryan Seacrest, who has co-hosted since 2005, succeeds him as sole host.

== Programs ==
=== Debuts ===
The following is a list of shows that premiered in 2012.

Due to the economic slowdown, there were notably fewer television pilots in 2012 than in the years immediately prior to that, which reduced the number of roles available for actors.

The fall of 2012 also mirrored 1992 in the volume of new daytime talk shows. The new talk roster will include shows hosted by first-timers Katie Couric, Steve Harvey, Jeff Probst, and Bethenny Frankel (Frankel's show had a Summer trial run on six Fox Television Stations after an earlier effort to gain a wider fall clearance failed, and will launch nationwide next fall). New talk shows will also feature Trisha Goddard (who hosted a talk show in her native United Kingdom) and Ricki Lake (whose new show will take a more mature tone compared to her 1993–2004 series).

The first ever television series to be produced in English and Spanish simultaneously, Justice for All with Judge Cristina Perez, which is being produced by Entertainment Studios, began to air on both English and Spanish language broadcasting outlets starting in September.

Start date	Show	Channel	Ref.
January 1	Oprah's Next Chapter	Oprah Winfrey Network	
January 1	Rachael vs. Guy: Celebrity Cook-Off	Food Network	
January 2	Early Start	CNN	
January 2	Starting Point	CNN	
January 3	Jane by Design	ABC Family	
January 3	Work It	ABC	
January 8	The Firm	NBC	
January 8	House of Lies	Showtime	
January 9	Caged	MTV	
January 10	Shipping Wars	A&E	
January 11	Are You There, Chelsea?	NBC	
January 12	¡Rob!	CBS	
January 12	The Finder	Fox	
January 14	CBS This Morning Saturday	CBS	
January 15	Napoleon Dynamite	Fox	
January 16	Alcatraz	Fox	
January 16	Betty White's Off Their Rockers	NBC	
January 16	Fred: The Show	Nickelodeon	
January 16	The Revolution	ABC	
January 17	ReModeled	The CW	
January 19	Unsupervised	FX	
January 20	On Freddie Roach	HBO	
January 24	Level Up	Cartoon Network	
January 25	Touch	Fox	
January 26	Fat Chef	Food Network	
January 27	Spartacus: Vengeance	Starz	
February 4	How to Rock	Nickelodeon	
February 6	Smash	NBC	
February 7	The River	ABC	
February 12	Comic Book Men	AMC	
February 12	Full Metal Jousting	History	
February 18	Melissa Harris-Perry	MSNBC	
February 18	Transformers: Rescue Bots	The Hub	
February 23	Shedding for the Wedding	The CW	
February 27	Lab Rats	Disney XD	
March 1	Awake	NBC	
March 4	GCB	ABC	
March 11	Shahs of Sunset	Bravo	
March 13	Fashion Star	NBC	
March 15	Missing	ABC	
March 21	Bent	NBC	
March 23	Doc McStuffins	Disney Jr.	
March 25	Leave It to Niecy	TLC	
March 29	The Pauly D Project	MTV	
April 1	Ultimate Spider-Man	Disney XD	
April 3	Holliston	Fearnet	
April 3	No Kitchen Required	BBC America	
April 4	Hit Music Central USA	NBC Nonstop	
April 4	Best Friends Forever	NBC	
April 5	Scandal	ABC	
April 6	Magic City	Starz	
April 8	The Client List	Lifetime	
April 11	Don't Trust the B— in Apartment 23	ABC	
April 14	The Legend of Korra	Nickelodeon	
April 15	Girls	HBO	
April 15	NYC 22	CBS	
April 19	Kathy	Bravo	
April 22	Veep	HBO	
April 22	Justin Time	Sprout	
April 27	Wild Grinders	Nicktoons	
April 30	The Pitch	AMC	
April 30	Motorcity	Disney XD	
May 5	Kaijudo	Hub Network	
May 8	United Stats of America	History	
May 11	Common Law	USA Network	
May 14	Rock Your Yoga	Veria Living TV	
May 18	Tron: Uprising	Disney XD	
May 20	Mrs. Eastwood & Company	E!	
May 20	The Catalina	The CW	
May 24	Duets	ABC	
May 25	Mystery Diners	Food Network	
May 28	The High Fructose Adventures of Annoying Orange	Cartoon Network	
May 31	Breaking Pointe	The CW	
June 2	Care Bears: Welcome to Care-a-Lot	The Hub	
June 2	Kaijudo: Rise of the Duel Masters	The Hub	
June 3	Yogi Cameron - A Model Guru	Veria Living TV	
June 7	Saving Hope	NBC	
June 8	Lives on Fire	Oprah Winfrey Network	
June 9	Million Dollar Neighborhood	Oprah Winfrey Network	
June 11	Bethenny	Fox O&O	
June 11	Bunheads	ABC Family	
June 12	World's Worst Tenants	Spike	
June 13	Dallas	TNT	
June 15	Gravity Falls	Disney Channel	
June 18	The Glass House	ABC	
June 18	Hollywood Heights	Nick at Nite	
June 18	Love & Hip Hop: Atlanta	VH1	
June 19	Bristol Palin: Life's a Tripp	Lifetime	
June 20	The Soul Man	TV Land	
June 20	Baby Daddy	ABC Family	
June 20	School Spirits	Syfy	
June 21	Snooki & Jwoww	MTV	
June 24	The Great Escape	TNT	
June 24	The Newsroom	HBO	
June 25	The Cycle	MSNBC	
June 28	Anger Management	FX	
June 28	Brand X with Russell Brand	FX	
July 1	Shark Wranglers	History	
July 4	Good Food America	Veria Living TV	
July 8	Bounty Wars	Discovery Channel	
July 8	Big Ang	VH1	
July 9	Good Afternoon America	ABC	
July 9	Perception	TNT	
July 10	Trust Us with Your Life	ABC	
July 10	NY Med	ABC	
July 11	Beverly Hills Nannies	ABC Family	
July 11	Picked Off	History	
July 12	Property Wars	Discovery Channel	
July 15	Small Town Security	AMC	
July 19	Great Lake Warriors	History	
July 19	Sullivan & Son	TBS	
July 26	Code: 9	Disney Channel	
July 29	Black Dynamite	Adult Swim	
July 30	NFL AM	NFL Network	
August 4	Robot and Monster	Nickelodeon	
August 7	DreamWorks Dragons	Cartoon Network	
August 8	Go On	NBC	
August 9	Totally Biased with W. Kamau Bell	FX	
August 12	Animal Practice	NBC	
August 12	Insane Coaster Wars	Travel Channel	
August 12	High School Moms	TLC	
August 13	Hotel Hell	Fox	
August 13	Major Crimes	TNT	
August 13	Randy Cunningham: 9th Grade Ninja	Disney XD	
August 14	The Week the Women Went	Lifetime	
August 14	The Burn with Jeff Ross	Comedy Central	
August 14	Counting Cars	History	
August 15	Toy Hunter	Travel Channel	
August 15	Oh Sit!	The CW	
August 16	The Next: Fame Is at Your Doorstep	The CW	
August 19	Copper	BBC America	
August 19	Married to Jonas	E!	
August 20	The Inbetweeners	MTV	
August 25	WWE Saturday Morning Slam	The CW	
September 3	Daniel Tiger's Neighborhood	PBS Kids	
September 4	Highway Thru Hell	Discovery Channel	
September 4	Steve Harvey	Syndication	
September 9	Breaking Amish	TLC	
September 10	The Jeff Probst Show	Syndication	
September 10	Katie	Syndication	
September 10	The Ricki Lake Show	Syndication	
September 11	The New Normal	NBC	
September 12	America's Car Show	WBBZ-TV	
September 17	The Mob Doctor	Fox	
September 17	Yoga Sutra Now	Veria Living TV	
September 17	Revolution	NBC	
September 17	Justice for All with Judge Cristina Perez	Syndication	
September 17	Trisha	Syndication	
September 18	Hot Set	Syfy	
September 19	How Booze Built America	History	
September 20	Bling It On	TLC	
September 21	Secret Princes	TLC	
September 22	Ben 10: Omniverse	Cartoon Network	
September 22	Mr. Box Office	Syndication	
September 22	The First Family	Syndication	
September 23	$24 in 24	Food Network	
September 24	Making it in America	HLN	
September 24	Chrissy & Mr. Jones	VH1	
September 24	Partners	CBS	
September 25	Vegas	CBS	
September 25	Ben and Kate	Fox	
September 25	The Mindy Project	Fox	
September 25	Brickleberry	Comedy Central	
September 26	Guys with Kids	NBC	
September 26	The Neighbors	ABC	
September 27	Last Resort	ABC	
September 27	Elementary	CBS	
September 28	Made in Jersey	CBS	
September 28	Flea Market Flip	HGTV	
September 29	Teenage Mutant Ninja Turtles	Nickelodeon	
September 30	666 Park Avenue	ABC	
September 30	Destination Fear	Travel Channel	
October 1	Marie	Hallmark Channel	
October 2	Airport 24/7: Miami	Travel Channel	
October 2	Oprah: Where Are They Now?	Oprah Winfrey Network	
October 2	Overhaulin'	Velocity	
October 3	Life After Top Chef	Bravo	
October 3	WWE Main Event	Ion Television	
October 8	Crash & Bernstein	Disney XD	
October 9	Mash Up	Comedy Central	
October 9	Abby's Ultimate Dance Competition	Lifetime	
October 10	Chicago Fire	NBC	
October 10	Nashville	ABC	
October 10	Arrow	The CW	
October 11	Beauty & the Beast	The CW	
October 12	Dog with a Blog	Disney Channel	
October 13	This Is How I Made It	MTV	
October 14	See Dad Run	Nick at Nite	
October 16	Emily Owens, M.D.	The CW	
October 16	The Men Who Built America	History	
October 16	Extreme Cheapskates	TLC	
October 16	Underemployed	MTV	
October 17	My Life is a Lifetime Movie	Lifetime	
October 22	Dr. Drew On Call	HLN	
October 22	Totally Clueless	MTV	
October 24	The Houstons: On Our Own	Lifetime	
October 24	A-List Listings	E!	
October 26	Health Inspectors	Food Network	
October 26	Jungle Gold	Discovery Channel	
October 26	Strip the City	Science Channel	
November 2	Malibu Country	ABC	
November 5	Start-Ups: Silicon Valley	Bravo	
November 6	Caught Red Handed	truTV	
November 10	Wedding Band	TBS	
November 10	Chainsaw Gang	CMT	
November 10	Littlest Pet Shop	The Hub	
November 12	Catfish: The TV Show	MTV	
November 13	Little People Big World: Wedding Farm	TLC	
November 13	Mankind: The Story of All of Us	History	
November 23	Killer Karaoke	truTV	
November 24	Marvin Marvin	Nickelodeon	
November 25	Sugar Dome	Food Network	
November 28	Love You, Mean It with Whitney Cummings	E!	
December 9	Sin City Rules	TLC	
December 10	Take It All	NBC	
December 12	Amish Mafia	Discovery Channel	
December 15	6 Little McGhees	Oprah Winfrey Network	
December 19	Cheer Perfection	TLC	
December 28	Teen Trouble	Lifetime	

=== Entering syndication this year ===
Show	Seasons	In production	Source
Star Wars: The Clone Wars	4	Yes	
Rules of Engagement	6	Yes	

=== Changes of network affiliation ===
The following shows will air new episodes on a different network than previous first-run episodes:

Show	Moved from	Moved to	Ref.
Postman Pat	Qubo	PBS Kids Sprout	
The Ultimate Fighter	Spike	FX	
Dog Whisperer with Cesar Millan	Nat Geo	Nat Geo Wild	
The Bill Cunningham Show	Syndication	The CW	
Dancin' On Air	Syndication	WPHL-TV	
Hollywood Squares	Syndication	MTV2	
Pyramid	Syndication	GSN	
Hollywood Heights	Nick at Nite	TeenNick	
How the Universe Works	Discovery Channel	Science Channel	
Survivorman	Discovery Channel	Science Channel	
World's Wildest Police Videos	Fox	Spike	
BBQ Pitmasters	TLC	Destination America	
Ancient Aliens	History	H2	
The Thick Of It	BBC	Hulu	
Toonami	Cartoon Network	Adult Swim	
Dallas	CBS	TNT	
The Joy Behar Show	HLN	Current TV	
TV's Bloopers & Practical Jokes	ABC	Syndication	
The Wonderful World of Disney	ABC	Disney Jr.	
Overhaulin'	TLC	Velocity	
Planet Sheen	Nickelodeon	Nicktoons	
Harry and His Bucket Full of Dinosaurs	Cartoon Network	Qubo	
Tickety Toc	Nickelodeon	Nick Jr. Channel	
Teenage Mutant Ninja Turtles	The CW4Kids	Nickelodeon	

=== Returning this year ===
The following shows will return with new episodes after being canceled previously:

Show	Last aired	Previous channel	Retitled as/same	New/returning/same channel	Return date	Ref.
CBS This Morning	1999	CBS	Same	Same	January 9	
The Wonderful World of Disney	2008	ABC	The Magical World of Disney Junior	Disney Jr.	March 23	
Punk'd	2007	MTV	Same	Same	March 29	
Cartoon Planet	2000	Cartoon Network	Same	Same	March 30	
Dancin' On Air	1987	Syndication	Same	WPHL-TV	March 31	
World's Wildest Police Videos	2001	Fox	Same	Spike	May 7	
Hollywood Squares	2004	Syndication	Hip Hop Squares	MTV2	May 22	
Toonami	2008	Cartoon Network	Same	Adult Swim	May 26	
Figure It Out	1999	Nickelodeon	Same	Same	June 11	
Dallas	1991	CBS	Same	TNT	June 13	
Pyramid	2004	Syndication	The Pyramid	GSN	September 3	
The Joy Behar Show	2011	HLN	Joy Behar: Say Anything!	Current TV	September 4	
Ricki Lake	2004	Syndication	The Ricki Lake Show	Same	September 10	
TV's Bloopers & Practical Jokes	2007	ABC	Bloopers	Syndication	September 15	
Cristina's Court	2009	Syndication	Justice for All with Judge Cristina Pérez	Same	September 17	
Saturday Night Live Weekend Update Thursday	2009	NBC	Same	Same	September 20	
Teenage Mutant Ninja Turtles	2009	4Kids TV	Same	Nickelodeon	September 29	
Overhaulin'	2009	TLC	Same	Velocity	October 2	
Nashville	2007	Fox	Same	ABC	October 10	

=== Milestone episodes and anniversaries ===
Show	Network	Episode#	Episode title	Episode air date	Ref.
Robot Chicken	Adult Swim	100th	"Fight Club Paradise"	January 15	
American Idol	Fox	10th anniversary	Savannah Auditions	January 18	
NCIS	CBS	200th	"Life Before His Eyes"	February 7	
The Simpsons	Fox	500th	"At Long Last Leave"	February 19	
The Rachael Ray Show	Syndication	1000th	none	February 20	
Phineas and Ferb	Disney Channel	150th	"Bully Bromance Breakup"	March 16	
iCarly	Nickelodeon	100th	"iBattle Chip"	June 9	
WWE Raw	USA Network	1000th		July 23	
Adventure Time	Cartoon Network	100th	"Ignition Point"	September 17	
Law & Order: Special Victims Unit	NBC	300th	"Manhattan Vigil"	October 24	
Mickey Mouse Clubhouse	Disney Jr.	100th	"Mickey and Donald Have a Farm"	November 5	
Dora the Explorer	Nick Jr.	150th	"Dora’s Royal Rescue"	November 5	

=== Ending this year ===
End date	Show	Channel	Debut	Status	Ref.
January 5	Big Shrimpin'	History	2011	Cancelled	
January 6	Wizards of Waverly Place (returned in 2013 and 2024)	Disney Channel	2007	Ended	
January 7	The Early Show	CBS	1999	Ended	
January 8	All-American Muslim	TLC	2011	Cancelled	
January 10	Work It	ABC	2012	Cancelled	
January 13	One Life to Live (returned in 2013)	ABC	1968	Cancelled	
January 19	Hole in the Wall	Cartoon Network	2008	Cancelled	
January 19	Man, Woman, Wild	Discovery Channel	2010	Cancelled	
January 22	Prime Suspect	NBC	2011	Cancelled	
January 26	Bakugan Battle Brawlers	Cartoon Network	2008	Ended	
January 27	Jim Rome Is Burning	ESPN2	2003	Ended	
January 27	Chuck	NBC	2007	Ended	
January 30	Who's Still Standing?	NBC	2011	Cancelled	
February 9	Money & Power	Fox Business Network	2010	Cancelled	
February 9	Follow The Money	Fox Business Network	2010	Cancelled	
February 9	Freedom Watch	Fox Business Network	2010	Cancelled	
February 10	Good Eats (returned in 2019)	Cooking Channel	2010	Ended	
February 12	Franklin	Nick Jr.	1997	Ended	
February 17	The Life & Times of Tim	HBO	2008	Cancelled	
February 17	Secret Mountain Fort Awesome	Cartoon Network	2011	Cancelled	
February 19	Pam Am	ABC	2011	Cancelled	
February 25	Postcards from Buster	PBS Kids Go!	2004	Cancelled	
March 1	Rob	CBS	2012	Cancelled	
March 2	A Gifted Man	CBS	2011	Cancelled	
March 4	Napoleon Dynamite	Fox	2012	Cancelled	
March 6	Campus PD	G4	2009	Cancelled	
March 20	I Hate My Teenage Daughter	Fox	2011	Cancelled	
March 20	The River	ABC	2012	Cancelled	
March 24	Luck	HBO	2011	Cancelled	
March 25	So Random!	Disney Channel	2011	Cancelled	
March 26	Alcatraz	Fox	2012	Cancelled	
March 28	Are You There, Chelsea?	NBC	2012	Cancelled	
March 29	Countdown with Keith Olbermann	Current TV	2011	Cancelled	
March 30	The Rosie Show	Oprah Winfrey Network	2011	Cancelled	
March 31	Ben 10: Ultimate Alien	Cartoon Network	2010	Ended	
April 2	Zeke and Luther	Disney XD	2009	Ended	
April 3	Breaking In	Fox	2011	Cancelled	
April 4	One Tree Hill	The CW	2003	Ended	
April 4	Bent	NBC	2012	Cancelled	
April 5	I Just Want My Pants Back	MTV	2011	Cancelled	
April 8	CSI: Miami	CBS	2002	Cancelled	
April 11	Man v. Food (returned in 2017)	Travel Channel	2008	Ended	
April 17	Ringer	The CW	2011	Cancelled	
April 19	Cash Cab (returned in 2017)	Discovery Channel	2005	Cancelled	
April 25	Voltron Force	Nicktoons	2011	Cancelled	
April 25	Swift Justice with Jackie Glass	Syndication	2010	Cancelled	
April 29	Breakout Kings	A&E Network	2011	Cancelled	
May 3	Lifechangers	The CW	2011	Cancelled	
May 4	In Plain Sight	USA Network	2008	Ended	
May 6	GCB	ABC	2012	Cancelled	
May 10	The Secret Circle	The CW	2011	Cancelled	
May 11	The Finder	Fox	2012	Cancelled	
May 11	Martha	Hallmark Channel	2005	Cancelled	
May 13	Desperate Housewives	ABC	2004	Ended	
May 14	Make It or Break It	ABC Family	2009	Ended	
May 17	Missing	ABC	2012	Cancelled	
May 17	Special Agent Oso	Disney Jr.	2009	Ended	
May 18	Who Do You Think You Are? (returned in 2013 and 2022)	NBC	2010	Cancelled	
May 21	House	Fox	2004	Ended	
May 24	The Nate Berkus Show	Syndication	2010	Ended	
May 24	Awake	NBC	2012	Cancelled	
May 27	Harry's Law	NBC	2011	Cancelled	
June 1	Best Friends Forever	NBC	2012	Cancelled	
June 7	Punk'd (returned in 2015 and 2020)	MTV	2003	Cancelled	
June 15	Fairly Legal	USA Network	2011	Cancelled	
June 22	The Dylan Ratigan Show	MSNBC	2009	Cancelled	
June 23	How to Be a Gentleman	CBS	2011	Cancelled	
June 24	Dog the Bounty Hunter	A&E Network	2004	Cancelled	
June 29	John King, USA	CNN	2010	Cancelled	
July 6	The Revolution	ABC	2012	Cancelled	
July 14	The Firm	NBC	2012	Cancelled	
July 15	1000 Ways to Die	Spike	2008	Cancelled	
July 16	Fear Factor (returned in 2017 and 2026)	NBC	2001	Cancelled	
July 16	Eureka	Syfy	2006	Ended	
July 19	Duets	ABC	2012	Cancelled	
July 20	Lives on Fire	Oprah Winfrey Network	2012	Cancelled	
July 25	Love in the Wild	NBC	2011	Cancelled	
July 29	3	CBS	2012	Cancelled	
July 31	Jane by Design	ABC Family	2012	Cancelled	
August 3	Fred: The Show	Nickelodeon	2012	Cancelled	
August 10	Tyler Perry's House of Payne (returned in 2020)	TBS	2006	Cancelled	
August 10	Common Law	USA Network	2012	Cancelled	
August 11	NYC 22	CBS	2012	Cancelled	
August 13	The Closer	TNT	2005	Ended	
August 28	Teen Mom	MTV	2009	Ended	
August 29	Political Animals	USA Network	2012	Cancelled	
September 1	Must Love Cats	Animal Planet	2011	Cancelled	
September 7	Good Afternoon America	ABC	2012	Ended	
September 10	Bachelor Pad	ABC	2010	Cancelled	
September 12	Damages	Audience Network	2007	Ended	
September 15	Dog Whisperer with Cesar Millan	Nat Geo Wild	2004	Ended	
September 23	Flip Men	Spike	2011	Cancelled	
September 16	Weeds	Showtime	2005	Ended	
October 24	Animal Practice	NBC	2012	Cancelled	
October 26	Jungle Junction	Disney Jr.	2009	Cancelled	
November 11	The Avengers: Earth's Mightiest Heroes	Disney XD	2010	Ended	
November 12	Partners	CBS	2012	Cancelled	
November 23	iCarly (returned in 2021)	Nickelodeon	2007	Ended	
November 30	Top 20 Countdown	CMT	2001	Ended	
December 2	Kick Buttowski: Suburban Daredevil	Disney XD	2010	Ended	
December 5	Code: 9	Disney Channel	2012	Cancelled	
December 8	How to Rock	Nickelodeon	2012	Cancelled	
December 15	Power Rangers Samurai	Nickelodeon	2011	Cancelled	
December 17	Gossip Girl	The CW	2007	Ended	
December 17	Extreme Makeover: Home Edition (returned in 2020 and 2025)	ABC	2003	Ended	
December 17	Take It All	NBC	2012	Cancelled	
December 20	Jersey Shore	MTV	2009	Ended	
December 25	Leverage (returned in 2021)	TNT	2008	Cancelled	
December 29	Made in Jersey	CBS	2012	Cancelled	

=== Movies and miniseries ===
Premiere date	Title	Channel	Ref.
January 7	Fixing Pete	Hallmark Channel	
January 7	Walking the Halls	Lifetime	
January 13	Frenemies	Disney Channel	
January 14	A Taste of Romance	Hallmark Channel	
January 14	Sexting in Suburbia	Lifetime	
January 21	Drew Peterson: Untouchable	Lifetime	
January 28	The Pregnancy Project	Lifetime	
January 28	Goodnight for Justice: The Measure of a Man	Hallmark Channel	
January 29	A Smile as Big as the Moon	ABC	
February 4	Cupid	Lifetime	
February 11	Secrets of Eden	Hallmark Channel	
February 17	Radio Rebel	Disney Channel	
February 25	Black Forest	Syfy	
February 25	Gretl: Witch Hunter	Syfy	
March 3	Blue-Eyed Butcher	Lifetime	
March 10	Of Two Minds	Lifetime	
March 10	Big Time Movie	Nickelodeon	
March 10	Game Change	HBO	
March 17	Leprechaun's Revenge	Syfy	
March 23	Ben 10: Destroy All Aliens	Cartoon Network	
April 14	Titanic	ABC	
April 21	Space Twister	Syfy	
April 22	Firelight	ABC	
April 28	Alien Tornado	Syfy	
May 5	Treasure Island	Syfy	
May 13	Notes from the Heart Healer	Hallmark Channel	
May 19	Lake Effects	Hallmark Channel	
May 20	Kiss at Pine Lake	Hallmark Channel	
May 20	Jesse Stone: Benefit of the Doubt	CBS	
May 26	Super Shark	Syfy	
May 28	Hatfields and McCoys	History	
May 28	Hemingway & Gellhorn	HBO	
May 28	Rags	Nickelodeon	
June 9	Hannah's Law	Hallmark Channel	
June 9	Jersey Shore Shark Attack	Syfy	
June 15	Let It Shine	Disney Channel	
June 16	Blue Lagoon: The Awakening	Lifetime	
June 16	Operation Cupcake	Hallmark Channel	
June 16	Piranhaconda	Syfy	
June 23	Arachnoquake	Syfy	
June 23	Big Baboon House	Nat Geo Wild	
June 30	Bigfoot	Syfy	
July 8	Puppy Love	Hallmark Channel	
July 15	How to Fall in Love	Hallmark Channel	
July 15	Political Animals	USA Network	
July 21	Always a Bride	Hallmark Channel	
July 21	An Officer and a Murderer	Lifetime	
August 4	The Week the Women Went	Lifetime	
August 12	The Music Teacher	Hallmark Channel	
August 19	Cedar Cove	Hallmark Channel	
August 25	Strawberry Summer	Hallmark Channel	
October 6	Abducted: The Carlina White Story	Lifetime	
October 7	Steel Magnolias	Lifetime	
October 12	Girl vs. Monster	Disney Channel	
October 13	American Horror House	Syfy	
October 20	The Girl	HBO	
October 26	Mockingbird Lane	NBC	
October 27	Rise of the Zombies	Syfy	
November 3	The Eleventh Victim	Lifetime	
November 4	Left to Die	Lifetime	
November 4	Love at the Thanksgiving Parade	Hallmark	
November 10	The Wishing Tree	Hallmark	
November 17	Matchmaker Santa	Hallmark	
November 18	Sofia the First: Once Upon a Princess	Disney Channel	
November 25	Liz & Dick	Lifetime	
November 29	A Fairly Odd Christmas	Nickelodeon	
November 29	Home Alone: The Holiday Heist	ABC Family	

== Networks and services ==
=== Launches ===
Network	Type	Launch date	Notes	Source
Epix Drive-In	Cable television	January 1		
NBC Sports Network	Cable television	January 1		
Exitos TV	Cable television	January 28		
CGTN America	Cable television	February 6		
DOGTV	Cable television	February 13		
Univision Tlnovelas	Cable television	March 1		
Disney Jr.	Cable television	March 23		
Univision Deportes Network	Cable television	April 7		
Aspire	Cable television	June 27		
MundoFox	Cable television	August 13		
Pac-12 Network	Cable and satellite	August 15		
beIN Sports	Cable television	August 16		
Heartland	Cable television	November 1		

=== Conversions and rebrandings ===
Old network name	New network name	Type	Conversion date	Notes	Source
ReelzChannel	Reelz	Cable television	Unknown		
NBC Nonstop	Cozi TV	Cable television	January 1		
Planet Green	Destination America	Cable television	May 25		
Maverick Television	MAVTV	Cable television	July 4		

=== Closures ===
Network	Type	Closure date	Notes	Source
n3D	Cable television	June 25		
VasalloVision	Cable television	August 13		

== Television stations ==
=== Launches ===
Date	Market	Station	Channel	Affiliation	Ref.
June 2	Saint Joseph, Missouri	KNPN-LD	26.1	Fox	
September 1	Parkersburg, West Virginia	WOVA-LD	22.1	Fox	
September 1	Parkersburg, West Virginia	WIYE-LD	47.1	CBS	
September 24	Panama City, Florida	WECP-LD	18.1	CBS	
October 23	Atlantic City, New Jersey	WACP	4.1	Independent	

=== Closures ===
Date	Market	Station	Channel	Affiliation	Sign-on date	Ref.
August 31	Tupelo, Mississippi	WKDH	45.1	ABC	June 18, 2001	

=== Stations changing network affiliation ===
The following is a list of television stations that have made or will make noteworthy network affiliation changes in 2012. In addition to the changes listed below, other stations were affected by the move of Universal Sports from an over-the-air to cable/satellite network, with affiliated stations either moving to other services (including some NBC O&O stations, which added the network's Nonstop-branded information channel) or letting the channel go dark.

Date	Market	Station	Channel	Prior affiliation	New affiliation	Ref.
January 1	Jackson, Tennessee	WBBJ-DT3	7.3	Weather radar	CBS (primary), MeTV (secondary)	
January 23	Boise, Idaho	KTRV-TV	12.1	Independent	MyNetworkTV	
February 17	Dallas, Texas	KTXD-TV	47.1	Independent	MeTV	
April 2	Paducah, Kentucky	WPSD-TV	6.2	Weather forecasts	Antenna TV	
April 8	Biloxi, Mississippi	WLOX	13.2	Weather radar	CBS	
May 21	Honolulu, Hawaii	KHNL	13.2	NBC Plus	Antenna TV	
May 21	Honolulu, Hawaii	KUPU	56.1	Antenna TV	Independent	
June 11	Hattiesburg, Mississippi	WDAM-TV	7.2	This TV	ABC	
June 24	Portland, Oregon	KATU	2.2	This TV	MeTV	
June 25	Biloxi, Mississippi	WXXV	25.2	MyNetworkTV (moves to cable only status)	NBC	
July 1	Pocatello/Idaho Falls, Idaho	KFXP	31.1	Fox	This TV	
July 1	Pocatello/Idaho Falls, Idaho	KXPI-LD	24.1	MyNetworkTV (moves to secondary status)	Fox (primary)	
July 1	Twin Falls, Idaho	KXTF	35.1	Fox	This TV	
July 1	Twin Falls, Idaho	KTWT-LP	43(.1)	MyNetworkTV (moves to secondary status)	Fox (primary)	
August 1	Milwaukee, Wisconsin	WBWT-LP	38	Azteca América	MundoFox	
August 1	Salt Lake City, Utah	KBTU-LP	23	Azteca América	MundoFox	
August 6	Greensboro, North Carolina	WXII-TV	12.2	This TV	MeTV	
August 13	Dallas, Texas	KFWD	52.1	Independent	MundoFox	
August 13	Fresno, California	KGMC	43.1	Independent	MundoFox	
August 13	Los Angeles, California	KWHY-TV	22.1	Spanish independent	MundoFox	
August 13	Oklahoma City, Oklahoma	KOHC-CD	45.1	Azteca América (moves to 45.2)	MundoFox	
August 13	Miami, Florida	WJAN-CD	41.1	Spanish independent	MundoFox	
September 1	Tupelo, Mississippi	WTVA	9.2	MeTV	ABC (moves from WKDH-TV)	
September 3	Sacramento, California	KCRA-TV	3.2	Independent	MeTV	
September 17	Oklahoma City, Oklahoma	KAUT-TV	43.1	MyNetworkTV	Independent (primary), Antenna TV (secondary)	
September 17	Oklahoma City, Oklahoma	KSBI	52.1	Independent	MyNetworkTV	
October 3	Harrisonburg, Virginia	WSVF-CA	43.1	Religious independent (as repeater of WAZT-CA/Woodstock, Virginia)	CBS	

== Births ==
Date	Name	Notability
April 4	Grumpy Cat	Cat (died 2019)

== Deaths ==
=== January ===
Date	Name	Age	Notability	Ref.
Jan 2	Jim Huber	67	Anchor/reporter for CNN and CNN/SI (The Sporting Life, Pro Golf Weekly); announcer and essayist for Turner Sports	
Jan 13	Richard Threlkeld	74	Reporter for CBS News and ABC News; anchor of CBS Morning News (1977–79)	
Jan 20	Etta James	73	Singer/songwriter ("At Last")	
Jan 22	Dick Tufeld	85	Announcer (ABC Daytime and several shows), on-air personality (KABC-TV), and voiceover actor (the robot on Lost in Space)	
Jan 24	James Farentino	73	Actor (The Bold Ones: The Lawyers, Blue Thunder)	
Jan 26	Robert Hegyes	60	Actor (Welcome Back, Kotter, Cagney & Lacey)	
Jan 28	Ian Abercrombie	77	Actor (Seinfeld, Wizards of Waverly Place)	
Jan 29	John Rich	86	Emmy-winning director (The Dick Van Dyke Show, All in the Family, Benson)	
Jan 31	Leslie Carter	25	Actress, singer and reality TV personality (House of Carters)	

=== February ===
Date	Name	Age	Notability	Ref.
Feb 1	Don Cornelius	75	TV host (the creator and first host of Soul Train)	
Feb 3	Ben Gazzara	81	Actor (Run for Your Life, An Early Frost, Hysterical Blindness)	
Feb 6	Peter Breck	82	Actor (Maverick, Black Saddle, The Big Valley)	
Feb 8	Philip Bruns	80	Actor (The Jackie Gleason Show, Mary Hartman, Mary Hartman)	
Feb 8	Laurie Main	89	Actor (Welcome to Pooh Corner)	
Feb 11	Whitney Houston	48	Singer, actress, and producer (Cinderella, 2-time host of the Nickelodeon Kids' Choice Awards, performance appearances including Dancing with the Stars and Saturday Night Live, and commercial pitch work including Diet Coke)	
Feb 24	Jan Berenstain	88	Co-author of the Berenstain Bears book franchise, which was adapted into an American and Canadian animated TV series	
Feb 29	Davy Jones	66	British actor and musician (The Monkees)	

=== March ===
Date	Name	Age	Notability	Ref.
March 1	Andrew Breitbart	43	Political commentator and frequent pundit for several TV networks who broke the Anthony Weiner sexting scandal story and the controversial story that resulted in the forced resignation of Shirley Sherrod	
March 27	Garry Walberg	90	Actor (Peyton Place, Quincy, M.E.)	
March 28	Earl Scruggs	88	Musician and actor (co-sang the theme song to The Beverly Hillbillies)	

=== April ===
Date	Name	Age	Notability	Ref.
April 5	Gil Noble	80	Reporter/anchor for WABC-TV/New York; host of Like It Is	
April 7	Mike Wallace	93	Journalist for CBS News, original correspondent on the network's 60 Minutes program	
April 9	Barry Cahill	90	Actor (The Young and the Restless)	
April 14	Jonathan Frid	87	Canadian actor (Dark Shadows)	
April 15	Paul Bogart	92	TV and film director (All in the Family, Get Smart, The Defenders)	
April 18	Dick Clark	82	TV host (The Dick Clark Show, Pyramid, American Bandstand, Dick Clark's New Year's Rockin' Eve) and producer (Dick Clark Productions)	
April 29	Joel Goldsmith	54	Composer (Stargate Atlantis, Stargate SG-1, Stargate Universe)	
April 30	George Murdock	81	Actor (Barney Miller, The X-Files)	

=== May ===
Date	Name	Age	Notability	Ref.
May 2	Junior Seau	43	Football player for the San Diego Chargers, Miami Dolphins and New England Patriots (Sports Jobs with Junior Seau)	
May 2	Digby Wolfe	82	British-born writer (Rowan & Martin's Laugh-In), actor, and singer	
May 4	Bob Stewart	91	Game show producer, creator of To Tell the Truth, Password, and The Price Is Right for Goodson–Todman and Pyramid, among a dozen other shows, for his own company	
May 6	George Lindsey	83	Actor (The Andy Griffith Show, Mayberry R.F.D., Hee Haw)	
May 8	Maurice Sendak	83	Children's book and television writer (Little Bear, Seven Little Monsters, Really Rosie, various segments for Sesame Street)	
May 12	Ruth Foster	92	Actress (Little House on the Prairie)	
May 17	Donna Summer	63	Singer/songwriter (guest appearances on Family Matters and Hollywood Squares, performance appearances including American Idol and America's Got Talent)	
May 20	Eugene Polley	96	Engineer for Zenith Electronics (1935–82) and inventor of the wireless remote control for TV	
May 22	Janet Carroll	71	Actress (Married... with Children, Melrose Place, Murphy Brown)	
May 23	Al Gordon	89	TV writer (The Jack Benny Program, The Smothers Brothers Comedy Hour, The Flip Wilson Show, The Carol Burnett Show)	
May 24	Lee Rich	93	Co-founder and chairman of Lorimar Television	
May 25	William Hanley	80	Playwright and TV writer (Flesh and Blood, Something About Amelia, The Attic: The Hiding of Anne Frank)	
May 29	Jim Paratore	59	Telepictures production executive and American television producer (TMZ on TV and Lopez Tonight)	
May 29	Dick Beals	85	Voice actor (The Gumby Show, Davey and Goliath and the voice of "Speedy Alka-Seltzer" in long-running Alka-Seltzer ad campaign)	

=== June ===
Date	Name	Age	Notability	Ref.
June 2	Kathryn Joosten	72	Character actress (Kathryn McCluskey on Desperate Housewives)	
June 2	Richard Dawson	79	British-American actor (Hogan's Heroes, Rowan & Martin's Laugh-In, The New Dick Van Dyke Show) and game show personality (Match Game, Family Feud)	
June 4	Eduard Khil	77	Russian singer whose vocalised song, known in the U.S. as "Trololo", received extensive television exposure in 2010	
June 5	Ray Bradbury	91	Horror, mystery, science fiction and fantasy writer (The Ray Bradbury Theater, The Martian Chronicles)	
June 6	Lillian Gallo	84	Producer (The Stranger Who Looks Like Me, Hustling, I Know What You Did and Duel)	
June 10	Frank Cady	96	Actor and commercial pitchman (Sam Drucker on Petticoat Junction and Green Acres)	
June 10	Judy Freudberg	62	Sesame Street writer who co-created the sketch Elmo's World, popularizing its "host" Elmo	
June 11	Ann Rutherford	94	Canadian-American film and TV actress (Perry Mason, Love, American Style, Tales of Wells Fargo, The Bob Newhart Show, Kraft Television Theatre)	
June 15	Yvette Wilson	48	Actress and comedian (Moesha, The Parkers, Thea)	
June 16	Dan Dorfman	82	Former CNBC financial journalist	
June 26	Nora Ephron	71	TV/print media journalist, actress, author, blogger, playwright, screenwriter, and director (Adam's Rib, Hopeless Pictures)	
June 26	Doris Singleton	92	Actress (most notable for playing Carolyn Appleby on I Love Lucy)	
June 27	Don Grady	68	Actor and musician (My Three Sons, The Mickey Mouse Club)	

=== July ===
Date	Name	Age	Notability	Ref.
July 2	Julian Goodman	90	News journalist, producer, and broadcasting executive (President of NBC from 1966 to 1974)	
July 3	Andy Griffith	86	Actor and musician (The Andy Griffith Show, The New Andy Griffith Show, Headmaster, Salvage 1 and Matlock)	
July 8	Ernest Borgnine	95	Actor (McHale's Navy, Airwolf, and a recurring role as Mermaid Man on SpongeBob SquarePants)	
July 13	Ginny Tyler	86	Actress (hosted segments of the Mickey Mouse Club for syndication, voice roles in Space Ghost and Dino Boy and Davey and Goliath)	
July 13	Richard D. Zanuck	77	Film director and producer (produced the 72nd Academy Awards telecast in 2000 and CBS Summer Playhouse)	
July 15	Celeste Holm	95	Actress (Nancy, guest starring roles in Wonder Woman and The Fugitive)	
July 16	William Asher	90	Director/writer (directed I Love Lucy, Bewitched; co-creator of The Patty Duke Show)	
July 16	Kitty Wells	92	Country music artist (co-host of The Kitty Wells/Johnnie Wright Family Show, solo host of The Kitty Wells Show)	
July 19	Tom Davis	59	Writer (Saturday Night Live)	
July 24	Sherman Hemsley	74	Actor, best known as George Jefferson on All in the Family and its spinoff The Jeffersons, Deacon Ernest Frye on Amen, and the voice of B.P. Richfield on Dinosaurs	
July 24	Chad Everett	75	Actor (Medical Center, Surfside 6)	
July 26	Lupe Ontiveros	69	Actress (Greetings from Tucson, Desperate Housewives)	
July 27	Norman Alden	87	Actor, known as the voice of Aquaman in Super Friends (1973–74), and The All-New Super Friends Hour (1977–78)	
July 27	Russ Mayberry	86	Director (In the Heat of the Night)	

=== August ===
Date	Name	Age	Notability	Ref.
August 7	Marvin Hamlisch	68	Broadway, film, music, stage and television composer, musician, songwriter and actor, and one of eleven performers to win an Oscar, Emmy, Tony and a Grammy (the theme song for Late Night with David Letterman and two Barbra Streisand specials)	
August 7	Judith Crist	90	TV and film critic for TV Guide and Today	
August 9	Al Freeman, Jr.	78	Actor (was the first African-American to win a Daytime Emmy Award for Outstanding Lead Actor for his portrayal of Ed Hall on One Life to Live in 1979)	
August 13	Kathi Goertzen	54	TV anchor/reporter (KOMO-TV/Seattle)	
August 14	Ron Palillo	63	Actor (Arnold Horshack on Welcome Back, Kotter)	
August 14	Phyllis Thaxter	92	Actress (Lux Video Theatre, Climax!, Alfred Hitchcock Presents, The F.B.I.)	
August 15	Biff Elliot	89	Actor (guest appearances: Cannon, Alfred Hitchcock Presents, Mission: Impossible)	
August 16	William Windom	88	Actor (My World and Welcome to It, The Farmer's Daughter, Murder, She Wrote)	
August 17	Joey Kovar	29	Reality TV personality (appeared on the 2008 season of MTV's The Real World)	
August 19	Tony Scott	68	Director/producer (produced NUMB3RS, The Good Wife, Gettysburg and AFP: American Fighter Pilot)	
August 20	Phyllis Diller	95	Comedian and actress (The Beautiful Phyllis Diller Show, The Bold and the Beautiful, Family Guy)	
August 23	Jerry Nelson	78	Puppeteer and voice actor (with The Muppets starting in 1970, Fraggle Rock, characters: Count von Count on Sesame Street, 1972 to 2004, and voice from 2004 until 2012)	
August 24	Steve Franken	80	Actor (The Many Loves of Dobie Gillis, Tom, Dick and Mary, Bewitched, Love, American Style)	
August 24	Claire Malis	69	Actress (Dorian Lord on One Life to Live from 1977 to 1979, Rose Polniaczek on The Facts of Life)	
August 25	Neil Armstrong	82	Astronaut who became the first man to walk on the Moon on July 20, 1969. An estimated 500 million people worldwide watched this event, the largest television audience for a live broadcast at that time.	
August 27	Russell Scott	91	Children's TV host/clown (star of Blinky's Fun Club on KKTV/Colorado Springs from 1958 to 1966 and from 1966 to 1998 on KWGN-TV/Denver)	

=== September ===
Date	Name	Age	Notability	Ref.
Sep 1	Sun Myung Moon	92	Korean leader of the Unification Church and its associated international business conglomerate; owned American Life Network from 2001 to 2009	
Sep 3	Michael Clarke Duncan	54	Actor (The Finder)	
Sep 10	Lance LeGault	77	Actor (The A-Team, Airwolf, Magnum, P.I., Werewolf)	
Sep 14	Stephen Dunham	48	Actor (Hot Properties, Oh, Grow Up, DAG, What I Like About You)	
Sep 15	John Ingle	84	Actor (Edward Quartermaine on General Hospital from 1993 to 2004 and 2006 to 2012, Mickey Horton on Days of Our Lives from 2004 to 2006)	
Sep 18	Steve Sabol	69	President and co-founder of NFL Films, whose clips are used on Inside the NFL and various NFL Network shows.	
Sep 23	Henry Champ	75	Canadian-born journalist for NBC News as well as Washington, D.C.-based reporter for Canada's CTV and CBC	
Sep 25	Andy Williams	84	Singer (hosted the variety series The Andy Williams Show from 1962 to 1971 and annual Happy New Year, America in the 1980s)	
Sep 26	Johnny Lewis	28	Actor (Sons of Anarchy, Quintuplets)	
Sep 28	Michael O'Hare	60	Actor (Commander Jeffrey Sinclair in Babylon 5, One Life to Live)	
Sep 28	Chris Economaki	91	Motorsports commentator and journalist (NASCAR and Formula One for ABC Sports from 1961 to 1984, CBS Sports from 1984 to 1995, ESPN from 1987 to 1988; ESPN's SpeedWeek and TBS' Motorweek Illustrated)	
Sep 28	Winrich Kolbe	71	German-born director (Magnum, P.I., Star Trek: The Next Generation, In the Heat of the Night, Star Trek: Deep Space Nine, Star Trek: Voyager)	

=== October ===
Date	Name	Age	Notability	Ref.
Oct 6	John Rovick	93	Children's program host (portrayed Sheriff John as host of Cartoon Time and Sheriff John's Lunch Brigade on KTTV/Los Angeles from 1952 to 1970, and the station's staff announcer at its 1949 sign-on until 1981)	
Oct 8	Ken Sansom	85	Actor and voice actor (voice of Rabbit in The New Adventures of Winnie the Pooh (1988–91); he would continue to voice the character until 2009)	
Oct 10	Beano Cook	81	College football commentator (served as a studio commentator for ABC from 1982 to 1985 and for ESPN from 1986 to 2012; employed as media director for ABC from 1966 to 1974)	
Oct 10	Alex Karras	77	Actor and defensive tackle for the Detroit Lions (George Papadapolis in Webster and serving as an analyst for Monday Night Football)	
Oct 13	Gary Collins	74	Actor and host (Hour Magazine from 1980 to 1988, ABC's Home from 1989 to 1994, the 1982 to 1990 Miss America Pageants)	
Oct 21	George McGovern	90	Politician and humanitarian (South Dakota Senator from 1962 to 1980, a Democratic presidential candidate in the 1968, 1972 and 1984 elections; guest hosted Saturday Night Live in 1984)	
Oct 22	Russell Means	72	Actor and Native American activist (TNT miniseries Into the West, Banshee)	
Oct 25	Emanuel Steward	68	Hall of Fame boxing trainer, analyst on HBO Boxing telecasts since 2001	
Oct 26	Natina Reed	32	Actress, rapper, singer, teen idol and songwriter in the R&B trio Blaque (guest appearances on V.I.P.)	
Oct 28	Alan Kirschenbaum	51	Comedy writer, TV producer and creator (Yes, Dear, My Name Is Earl, Raising Hope)	

=== November ===
Date	Name	Age	Notability	Ref.
Nov 5	Joel Connable	39	TV anchor and reporter (WLTX/Columbia, South Carolina, KCBS–KCAL/Los Angeles, WTVJ/Miami, NBC News as a fill-in anchor for Early Today and at MSNBC; had joined KOMO-TV/Seattle as a weekend anchor shortly before his death)	
Nov 7	Frank Peppiatt	85	Canadian TV producer, writer and creator (co-creator of Hee Haw)	
Nov 8	Lucille Bliss	96	Voice actress (Crusader Rabbit, The Smurfs, The Jetsons, Invader Zim)	
Nov 16	Jefferson Kaye	75	Announcer (Action News at WPVI/Philadelphia and various NFL Films telecasts)	
Nov 21	Deborah Raffin	59	Actress (7th Heaven, the miniseries Noble House)	
Nov 21	Emily Squires	71	Director and screenwriter (Sesame Street, As the World Turns, Guiding Light, Search for Tomorrow, The Secret Storm, Between the Lions)	
Nov 21	Art Ginsburg	81	TV chef and author (most notable for his "Mr. Food" segments seen throughout the United States during newscasts on local television stations)	
Nov 23	Larry Hagman	81	Actor, producer and director (J.R. Ewing on Dallas and its revival series, Anthony "Tony" Nelson on I Dream of Jeannie)	
Nov 24	Héctor Camacho	50	Puerto Rican boxer and reality television personality (appeared as a contestant on Univision's Mira Quien Baila in 2010)	

=== December ===
Date	Name	Age	Notability	Ref.
Dec 1	Reinhold Weege	62	Producer/writer (creator of Night Court, and served as writer for Barney Miller and M*A*S*H)	
Dec 5	Eileen Pollock	86	Writer and producer (Dynasty, The Colbys)	
Dec 8	Jenni Rivera	43	Mexican-American singer-songwriter, actress and reality television personality/producer (I Love Jenni, Jenni Rivera Presents: Chiquis and Raq-C, Chiquis 'n Control, La Voz... México)	
Dec 10	Paul Rauch	78	TV/film producer (executive producer for Another World, One Life to Live, Santa Barbara, Guiding Light, co-executive producer on The Young and the Restless)	
Dec 12	Joe Allbritton	87	Founder of Allbritton Communications Company.	
Dec 12	Don Medford	95	Director (Tales of Tomorrow, The F.B.I., Dynasty)	
Dec 22	Cliff Osmond	75	Actor (appearances include The Twilight Zone, Gunsmoke, Matt Houston)	
Dec 23	Capital Steez	19	Rapper	
Dec 24	Jack Klugman	90	Actor (The Odd Couple, Quincy, M.E.)	
Dec 24	Charles Durning	89	Actor (Rescue Me, Evening Shade)	
Dec 27	Harry Carey, Jr.	91	Actor (The Adventures of Spin and Marty, Have Gun – Will Travel, Gunsmoke, Police Woman)	

== See also ==
- 2012 in the United States
- List of American films of 2012
