= Lives on Fire =

- Genre: Documentary
- Country of origin: United States
- No. of seasons: 1
- No. of episodes: 6

Production
- Executive producers: Anthony Samu; Brad Epstein; Elli Hakami; Jane Tranter; Melody Shafir; Michael Brooks
- Running time: 40 to 42 minutes
- Production company: BBC Worldwide Productions

Original release
- Network: OWN: Oprah Winfrey Network
- Release: June 8 – July 20, 2012

Lives on Fire is an American reality documentary television series on the Oprah Winfrey Network that debuted on June 8, 2012.

The network ordered a six episode first season of the series which was completely produced and finished. The series premiered with 163,000 viewers and the following episode obtaining 121,000 viewers. Citing low viewership, OWN pulled the series from its broadcasting schedule and the remaining episodes of the series were burned off on July 20, 2012.

== Premise ==
The series follows four female firefighters as they battle out the drama, action and danger of their jobs while they respond to life and death situations.

== Cast ==
- Nica Vasquez
- Rosanne Grier
- Michele Dyck
- Diley Greiser

== Episodes ==
No.	Title	Original release date	U.S. viewers (millions)
1	"Only the Strong Survive"	June 8, 2012	0.163
Michele helps recover a corpse. Rose starts her first shift at the firehouse while Diley continues to prove herself to the team.
2	"The Sacrifices We Make"	June 15, 2012	0.121
Rose faces her first wildfire . Diley hurts her back. Nica puts out a house fire. Michele helps a drowning man.
3	"Lives Can Be Lost"	July 20, 2012	N/A
Michele helps a pregnant woman while Diley's maternal instincts are put to the rest. Rose attempts to save a man who was discovered unconscious.
4	"Always on the Line"	July 20, 2012	N/A
Diley responds to an attempted suicide report. Michele passes her swim test. Rose puts out a wildfire and Nica helps a pregnant lady who was involved in an accident.
5	"A Lot at Stake"	July 20, 2012	N/A
Rose prepares for her first county fire. Diley meets her Cuban family for the first time. Michele gets ready for the academy. Nica is getting ready for her daughter's wedding.
6	"Stronger Than You Think"	July 20, 2012	N/A
In the series finale, Michele is off to attend the fire academy. Nica goes to Las Vegas for her daughter's wedding. Rose gets some shocking news. Diley responds to an explosion incident.
