= Great Lake Warriors =

- Country of origin: United States
- No. of seasons: 1
- No. of episodes: 8

Production
- Executive producers: George Houde; Jim Campbell; Jonathan Towers; Joseph Boyle; Marty Bernstein; Matthew Ginsburg
- Production companies: Compass Point Productions; Towers Productions

Original release
- Network: History
- Release: July 19 – September 6, 2012

Great Lake Warriors is an American and Canadian reality television series on History that premiered on July 19, 2012.

== Premise ==
The show follows the lives of a number of tugboat sailors in the Great Lakes region. The show features Calumet River Fleeting, Selvick Marine Towing, Heritage Marine, and Thunder Bay Tug Services. The companies are located in Duluth, Minnesota, South Chicago, Illinois, and Thunder Bay, Ontario, respectively.

== Episodes ==
No.	Title	Original release date
1	"The Lethal Season"	July 19, 2012
2	"Suicide Mission"	July 26, 2012
3	"Collision Course"	August 2, 2012
4	"Make or Break"	August 9, 2012
5	"Death's Door"	August 16, 2012
6	"Dead of Winter"	August 23, 2012
7	"Friday the 13th"	August 30, 2012
8	"The Final Battle"	September 6, 2012
