= Bounty Wars =

American reality television series

- Genre: Reality
- Country of origin: United States
- Original language: English
- No. of seasons: 1
- No. of episodes: 3(2 Unaired)

Production
- Executive producers: Craig Coffman; Jonathan Koch; Keri Selig; Sonia Slutsky; Steve Michaels; Tara Hunter
- Production company: Asylum Entertainment

Original release
- Network: Discovery Channel
- Release: July 8, 2012

Bounty Wars is an American reality television series on the Discovery Channel that debuted on July 8, 2012. Only one episode of the series aired, and has since been cancelled.

== Episodes ==
No.	Title	Original release date
1	"Every Minute Counts"	July 8, 2012
2	"Down to the Wire"	July 15, 2012 (unaired)
3	"Ruse It or Lose It"	July 22, 2012 (unaired)
