= Health Inspectors =

- Genre: Documentary
- Presented by: Ben Vaughn
- Country of origin: United States
- Original language: English
- No. of seasons: 1
- No. of episodes: 7

Production
- Running time: 21 minutes (excluding commercials)

Original release
- Network: Food Network
- Release: October 26 – December 7, 2012

Health Inspectors is an American reality television series on the Food Network. The series debuted on October 26, 2012 and follows Ben Vaughn as he volunteers his time to various restaurateurs around the country, who need to renovate their restaurants.

== Episodes ==
No.	Title	Original release date	Prod. code	U.S. viewers (millions)
1	"Rats in the Cellar"	October 26, 2012	IQ0101H	0.83
2	"Renegade Pirates"	November 2, 2012	IQ0102H	1.03
3	"Slugs in the Walk-in"	November 9, 2012	IQ0103H	0.86
4	"Recipe for Disaster"	November 16, 2012	IQ0104H	0.74
5	"A Game of Chicken"	November 23, 2012	IQ0105H	0.81
6	"Pizza Scare"	November 30, 2012	IQ0106H	0.72
7	"Big Momma's Chicken & Waffles"	December 7, 2012	IQ0100H	0.70

== See also ==
- Public health inspector
- Environmental health officer
