= Fat Chef =

2012 American reality TV series

- Genre: Reality show
- Starring: Christine Avanti; Robert Brace; Brett Hoebel
- No. of seasons: 1
- No. of episodes: 6

Production
- Running time: 60 mins. (including commercials)

Original release
- Network: Food Network
- Release: January 26 – March 1, 2012

Fat Chef is a reality show on the Food Network, which premiered on January 26, 2012.

== Cast ==
- Christine Avanti
- Robert Brace
- Brett Hoebel

== Episodes ==
No.	Title	Original release date	Prod. code
1	"Michael/Melba"	January 26, 2012	XF0101H
2	"Rocco/Kimberly"	February 2, 2012	XF0102H
3	"Ally/Mike"	February 9, 2012	XF0103H
4	"Dimitri/Chelsie"	February 16, 2012	XF0104H
5	"Jeff/Maggie"	February 23, 2012	XF0105H
6	"John/Jen"	March 1, 2012	XF0106H
