= My Life Is a Lifetime Movie =

- Genre: Documentary
- Country of origin: United States
- No. of seasons: 1
- No. of episodes: 7

Production
- Executive producers: Colleen Conway; Gena McCarthy; Jessica Antonini; Jordan Roberts; Liz Gateley; Rob Sharenow; Tony DiSanto
- Running time: 42 minutes
- Production company: DiGa Productions

Original release
- Network: Lifetime
- Release: October 17 – November 28, 2012

My Life Is a Lifetime Movie is an American reality television series that premiered on Lifetime on October 17, 2012.

== Premise ==
The series mashes together cinematic recreations along with first-hand details with women who relive their shocking life experiences.

== Episodes ==
| No. | Title | Original release date | U.S. viewers (millions) |
|---|---|---|---|
| 1 | "Lovely Little Liars" | October 17, 2012 | 0.453 |
| 2 | "Betrayed by a Lover" | October 24, 2012 | 0.761 |
| 3 | "Husbands Gone Wrong" | October 31, 2012 | 0.481 |
| 4 | "Teens Gone Wild" | November 7, 2012 | 0.585 |
| 5 | "Celebrity Sex" | November 14, 2012 | 0.664 |
| 6 | "Obsessions Gone Too Far" | November 21, 2012 | 0.654 |
| 7 | "Someone Is Trying to Ruin My Life" | November 28, 2012 | 0.626 |

== Critical reception ==
In a review in The Washington Post, Emily Yahr said that the half-scripted, half-documentary hybrid format doesn't work and the show is delivering a mixed tone. Robert Owen of The Pittsburgh Post-Gazette said the viewers will be disappointed by the series. A review in Variety called the show more like a water-cooler gossip than actual true-crime material. Common Sense Media said the movie has a tongue-in-cheeck tone at times.
