= Take It All (game show) =

American game show

- Genre: Game show
- Presented by: Howie Mandel
- Announcer: Donna Ruko
- Country of origin: United States
- Original language: English
- No. of seasons: 1
- No. of episodes: 6

Production
- Executive producers: Howie Mandel; Mike Marks; Scott St. John
- Production companies: Universal Television; Alevy Productions

Original release
- Network: NBC
- Release: December 10 – December 17, 2012

Related
- Deal or No Deal; America's Got Talent

Take It All is an American game show hosted by Deal or No Deal host Howie Mandel. It premiered on NBC on December 10, 2012, as part of the 2012–13 television season. In April 2012, NBC placed a seven-episode order for the show under the original title Howie Mandel's White Elephant.

On each episode, five contestants participate in a game similar to a white elephant gift exchange, attempting to win or steal more-valuable prizes each round to avoid elimination. The final two contestants participate in a variant on the prisoner's dilemma in which one decision by each of the two finalists determines whether they both go home with prizes, one winner takes everything, or they both go home with nothing.

== Gameplay ==
=== Main game ===
Five unopened boxes, each containing a prize worth between $5,000 and $12,000, are displayed on a video wall. The first contestant chooses a box, whose contents are revealed; however, the price is not stated. Each subsequent contestant may either choose a box or steal the prize from one opponent. When a contestant's prize is stolen, they must immediately either steal from a different opponent or choose one of the remaining boxes. They may not immediately steal back the prize that was taken from them. Once per game, each contestant may secretly choose to block the prize they hold from being stolen by any opponent for the rest of that round.

The round continues until every contestant has a prize. If all contestants after the first choose boxes and/or steal only from one another, the first contestant is given an opportunity to trade prizes with one opponent if they choose; this is treated the same as an attempt to steal and can be blocked. The values of the prizes are then revealed, and the contestant with the least valuable prize is eliminated and forfeits all their winnings.

Two more rounds are played in this manner, with one available box per contestant and increased prize values in each: $15,000 to $25,000 in the second round, and $30,000 to $100,000 in the third. In each of these rounds, the contestant who finished with the most valuable prize in the previous one chooses first. The two remaining contestants after the third round advance to the Prize Fight.

=== Prize Fight ===
The final two contestants each select one envelope from a set of 10, containing cash values that range from $25,000 to $250,000. The values in the envelopes are not immediately revealed. Each separately and secretly decides to "keep mine" or "take it all," similar in format to the prisoner's dilemma. If both contestants choose "keep mine," each receives the prizes they accumulated in the first three rounds, plus the cash value of the envelope they chose. If one chooses "keep mine" and the other chooses "take it all," the "take it all" contestant wins the prizes and cash awards accumulated by both, while the "keep mine" contestant leaves with nothing. If both choose "take it all," they lose all their cash and prizes and leave empty-handed.

== Nielsen ratings ==
	Date	Rating	Share	Rating/share (18–49)	Viewers (millions)
Episode 1	December 10, 2012	4.3	6	2.2/5	7.12
Episode 2	December 11, 2012	4.5	7	2.2/6	7.18
Episode 3	December 12, 2012	2.2	3	1.1/3	3.40
Episode 4	December 13, 2012	2.4	4	1.2/3	3.93
Episode 5	December 14, 2012	2.9	5	1.1/3	4.70
Episode 6	December 17, 2012			1.5/4	4.53
