= Totally Clueless =

US television program

- Genre: Game show
- Starring: Kristen Acimovic; Giulio Gallarotti; Alison Bennett; James Manzello; Patrice M. Harris; Nico Elicerio
- Country of origin: United States
- Original language: English
- No. of seasons: 1
- No. of episodes: 20

Production
- Executive producers: Bob Kusbit; Brian Flanagan; Francis Lyons; Karen Frank; Laura Palumbo Johnson; Marcy Dyno; Matthew Ostrom; Matthew Parillo; Tony DiBari
- Production companies: One Louder Productions; Magilla Entertainment

Original release
- Network: MTV
- Release: October 22 – November 30, 2012

Totally Clueless is an American hidden camera game show on MTV that premiered on October 22, 2012.

== Cast ==
- Kristen Acimovic
- Giulio Gallarotti
- Alison Bennett
- James Manzello
- Patrice M. Harris
- Nico Elicerio

== Episodes ==
| No. | Title | Original release date |
|---|---|---|
| 1 | "Full House, Get Me Out Of Here, Bizarro Bridal" | October 22, 2012 |
| 2 | "Harassment Headache, Phony Free FroYo, Dry Run Nanny" | October 23, 2012 |
| 3 | "Babysitter Backfire, Irritable Yogi, Spary On Put On." | October 24, 2012 |
| 4 | "My Friend's A D-Bag, Be Right Back, Sat Tutor Abduction." | October 25, 2012 |
| 5 | "Dueling Reporters, Wheelchair Walkout, Contagious Kristen's Class Reunion." | October 29, 2012 |
| 6 | "Bilingual Bust, Trippy Manicure, Thousand Dollar Cupcake." | October 30, 2012 |
| 7 | "Moving Breakup, Firing Squad, A Family Affair." | October 31, 2012 |
| 8 | "Not So Happy Life Coach, Girl Band Body Pop, Superhero Sidekick." | November 1, 2012 |
| 9 | "Dirty Restaurant Blogger, Lovers' Lane, Freaky First Day" | November 6, 2012 |
| 10 | "Reverse Intervention, A Dancing Affair, Sleepy Stylist" | November 7, 2012 |
| 11 | "How I Met Your Roommate, Blindman Wingman, Girlfriend Fiancee Wife Meltdown." | November 8, 2012 |
| 12 | "Makeover Takeover, Big Brother Blind Date, Juice Heads." | November 13, 2012 |
| 13 | "Buzzkill Office Party, Wardrobe Malfunction, Peculiar Pet Store." | November 14, 2012 |
| 14 | "Employment Con, Life Imitates Art, Pregnant Restaurant." | November 15, 2012 |
| 15 | "Pedicure Hot Seat, Lost In Translation, Makeup Meltdown." | November 16, 2012 |
| 16 | "That's One Mischievous Bitch, Not So Plus Size Model, Twisted Sisters." | November 26, 2012 |
| 17 | "Delivery Dilemma; Breakup Boutique; Dirty Word..." | November 27, 2012 |
| 18 | "Yes I Live Here; On the Job Blind Date; Bipola..." | November 28, 2012 |
| 19 | "Phony Fiancee; A Wrinkle in Cream; Shady Nutri..." | November 29, 2012 |
| 20 | "Klepto Blind Date; Hostel Headache; Faux Sale" | November 30, 2012 |
