= Now in America =

- Genre: News Program
- Presented by: Susan Hendricks
- Country of origin: United States
- Original language: English

Production
- Executive producer: Jennifer Bernstein Adams

Original release
- Network: HLN
- Release: September 24, 2012 – November 15, 2013

Now In America (formerly Making It In America) was a news program airing on HLN, which premiered on September 24, 2012. It is hosted by Susan Hendricks. In early May 2013, the show was renamed Now In America.
