= 24: Legacy =

American television series

- Genre: Drama; Political thriller; Espionage thriller; Action thriller
- Created by: Manny Coto; Evan Katz
- Based on: 24 by Joel Surnow; Robert Cochran
- Starring: Corey Hawkins; Miranda Otto; Anna Diop; Teddy Sears; Ashley Thomas; Dan Bucatinsky; Coral Peña; Charlie Hofheimer; Sheila Vand; Raphael Acloque; Gerald McRaney; Jimmy Smits
- Music by: Sean Callery
- Country of origin: United States
- Original language: English
- No. of seasons: 1
- No. of episodes: 12

Production
- Executive producers: Manny Coto; Evan Katz; Howard Gordon; Brian Grazer; Kiefer Sutherland; Stephen Hopkins
- Production locations: Los Angeles, California (pilot); Atlanta, Georgia
- Cinematography: Peter Levy; Jeffrey C. Mygatt
- Editors: John Smith; Garret Donnelly; Scott Powell; James Coblentz; Joe Hobeck
- Running time: 43 minutes
- Production companies: Imagine Television; Teakwood Lane Productions; Coto/Katz Productions; 20th Century Fox Television

Original release
- Network: Fox
- Release: February 5 – April 17, 2017

Related
- 24

24: Legacy is an American television series created by Manny Coto and Evan Katz that aired on Fox network from February 5 to April 17, 2017. The series is a spin-off of 24 which was created by Joel Surnow and Robert Cochran and its premiere served as the lead-out program for Super Bowl LI before moving to its regular time slot of Monday at 8:00 p.m. The series' premiere was watched by 17.6 million people, the lowest post-Super Bowl program viewership since 2003's Alias but the most viewed episode in the franchise's history.

Consisting of 12 episodes, the show follows the life of war hero and ex-United States Army Ranger Sergeant Eric Carter (Corey Hawkins) using real time method of narration. Miranda Otto plays Rebecca Ingram, the former National Director of the now revived Counter Terrorist Unit in Washington, D.C. Set three years after the events of 24: Live Another Day, it adheres to the real time concept of covering the events of a 24-hour period and begins and ends at 12:00 pm. However, like Live Another Day, there is a 12-hour time jump within the final episode.

In June 2017, Fox announced that the series was cancelled. At the time, Fox had plans to develop a new incarnation of the 24 franchise. Those plans were later cancelled.

== Synopsis ==
After leading a mission to eliminate terrorist leader Sheikh Ibrahim bin-Khalid, Eric Carter (Corey Hawkins), an ex-United States Army Ranger Sergeant who returns to the U.S. and finds out that he and his squad mates are being hunted down and killed because one of his team unwittingly stole a flash drive containing a list of American-based terrorist sleeper cells and the codes to activate them for future attacks. With nowhere else to turn, Carter asks CTU to help him save his life while also stopping a series of devastating terrorist sleeper cell attacks on American soil. The series takes place three years after the events of 24: Live Another Day and is set in Washington, D.C.

== Cast and characters ==
=== Starring ===
- Corey Hawkins as Eric Carter, an ex-United States Army Ranger Sergeant who has returned to the U.S. and is determined to stop the terrorist attacks that may follow. It is stated in episode 3 that Carter also served in Army Special Forces after the Rangers.
- Miranda Otto as Rebecca Ingram, the former National Director of the Counter Terrorist Unit, and the wife of Senator John Donovan, who is running for President of the United States.
- Anna Diop as Nicole Carter, a nurse and Eric's wife.
- Teddy Sears as Keith Mullins, the new, ambitious and driven National Director of CTU, who previously worked under Rebecca.
- Ashley Thomas as Isaac Carter, a drug dealer and older brother of Eric who is angry at him for their bitter past involving Eric's wife, Nicole.
- Dan Bucatinsky as Andy Shalowitz, a communication analyst at CTU who is trusted by Rebecca and is unhappily paired with computer analyst Mariana.
- Coral Peña as Mariana Stiles, a bright, young, self-taught computer analyst and cousin of former CTU intelligence analyst Edgar Stiles; she is paired with Andy.
- Charlie Hofheimer as Ben Grimes, Eric's former comrade and an ex-Sergeant in the Army Ranger unit who is now suffering from PTSD.
- Sheila Vand as Nilaa Mizrani, Senator John Donovan's campaign manager.
- Raphael Acloque as Jadalla bin-Khalid, a university student who has embraced his father's jihadist campaign since his death.
- Gerald McRaney as Henry Donovan, the father of presidential candidate John Donovan, who is a powerful oil man and passionately devoted father, dedicated to putting his son in the White House, no matter what the obstacles.
- Jimmy Smits as John Donovan, a Senator who is running for president, and Rebecca Ingram's husband.

=== Special guest star ===
- Carlos Bernard as Tony Almeida, a former CTU Los Angeles Director and mercenary with a checkered past.

=== Guest starring ===
- Zayne Emory as Drew Phelps, a junior at Marshall High School who has a crush on Amira.
- Kathryn Prescott as Amira Dudayev, a Chechen high school student and Khasan's sister.
- Kevin Christy as David Harris, a chemistry teacher planning a bombing along with his student and secret lover, Amira.
- Bailey Chase as Thomas Locke, CTU's Director of Field Operations.
- Laith Nakli as Kusuma, second-in-command of Jadalla and one of the jihadists looking for Eric Carter.
- Tiffany Hines as Aisha, Isaac's girlfriend who helps him with his drug-dealing business.
- Themo Melikidze as Khasan Dudayev, Amira's brother and one of bin-Khalid's sleeper cells.
- Daniel Zacapa as Luis Diaz, Senator John Donovan's maternal uncle, and a political operative for his nephew's campaign for President of the United States.
- Moran Atias as Sidra, Tony's associate who instigates feelings of distrust between Tony and Ingram.
- Dylan Ramsey as Rashid Al-Sabi, a jihadi soldier in bin-Khalid's organization and Malik's brother.
- Saad Siddiqui as Malik Al-Sabi, a jihadi soldier in bin-Khalid's organization and Rashid's brother.
- Oded Fehr as Asim Naseri, second-in-command of bin-Khalid.
- Eli Danker as Sheikh Ibrahim bin-Khalid, a terrorist leader and Jadalla's father.
- James Moses Black as Donald Simms, the Director of National Intelligence.
- Zeeko Zaki as Hamid, a jihadi supporting Jadalla bin-Khalid's campaign.

== Episodes ==
No.	Title	Directed by	Written by	Original release date	Prod. code	US viewers (millions)
1	"12:00 Noon – 1:00 PM"	Stephen Hopkins	Manny Coto & Evan Katz	February 5, 2017	1AZK01	17.58
Terrorist leader Sheikh Ibrahim Bin-Khalid's men, seeking a "strongbox" stolen during a military operation, search for Eric Carter and Ben Grimes. Meanwhile, Rebecca Ingram arrives at CTU in Washington to discuss a trivial matter with Mullins, the new head of CTU who is replacing her so she can spend more time with her husband, Senator John Donovan, who is running for President. Eric's wife, Nicole, helps him kill the three attackers; and he calls Ingram, who supported the operation. Believing that Mullins is a mole, she tells Eric not to trust the police nor the FBI. Eric convinces his brother Isaac (Nicole's former boyfriend), now a local gang leader, to protect her until he finishes investigating the persons behind this. Ingram tells Shalowitz about Mullins and enlists his help in using CTU surveillance to help Eric find Grimes. Stiles finds out and tells Mullins, who confronts Ingram. She tasers him unconscious and continues helping Eric, who finally finds Grimes with the strongbox, shown to contain a USB drive listing Bin-Khalid's sleeper cells. They are attacked by the terrorists, whom Eric kills. However, he finds Grimes gone with the drive, then receives a call from him demanding money in exchange for it. Meanwhile at a New Jersey high school, Drew Phelps tells his teacher, Mr. Harris, about Amira Dudayev's terrorist affiliations, but Harris is later shown to be Dudayev's boyfriend and associate.
2	"1:00 PM – 2:00 PM"	Jon Cassar	Evan Katz & Manny Coto	February 6, 2017	1AZK02	6.22
Grimes gives Eric one hour to arrive with two million dollars for the USB drive. Isaac tells Eric about four million in cash that the MPD seized recently. At CTU, Ingram locks Mullins in a room and convinces him to give her his override in order to help Eric and prove Mullins' innocence. Eric captures two police officers and forces their compliance. They enter the precinct and go to the evidence room, where he finds the money. Eric convinces Grimes to give him 45 minutes to reach the location for the exchange, but he is spotted by other officers and locks himself inside the building. Meanwhile, Shalowitz learns that Mizrani is the person who breached the director's network and leaked information to the terrorists. Stiles tells Locke about the recent events. They free Mullins, who orders the arrest of Ingram and Shalowitz. At a fund raising party at the Donovan household, Henry Donovan tells his son, John, about his rival's plan to attack him by releasing the fact that Mizrani previously attended a radical Islamist mosque. She states that she went there to oppose the Imam. Elsewhere, Jadalla is revealed to be the leader of the jihadi terror cell that is after the strongbox. Phelps learns about Dudayev and Harris, who apparently kills him. Aisha contacts the Dominicans and offers them a deal to have Isaac killed so she can take over his gang for herself. Nicole becomes suspicious of her, and her life is soon in danger.
3	"2:00 PM – 3:00 PM"	Jon Cassar	Howard Gordon & Leigh Dana Jackson	February 13, 2017	1AZK03	5.14
Eric is released by the police under orders from Mullins, who also releases Ingram and Shalowitz, deciding to oversee the operation. Eric proceeds to the train station, where he rendezvouses with Grimes, with Keith in charge of surveillance and Locke, who is revealed to be Shalowitz' former boyfriend, chasing them. While Grimes recovers the drive, Jadalla and his men arrive and engage CTU. Grimes is forced to escape, but is shot by a jihadist. Jadalla recovers the drive and escapes, with Eric losing him. Meanwhile, Ingram interrogates Mizrani about her whereabouts on the day that the identities of the Rangers were accessed, which she denies doing. It is later revealed that Henry was behind the leak for reasons unclear. Seriously injured, Phelps awakens and escapes, alarming Dudayev and Harris. He falls unconscious in the soccer field and is seen by students, who call an ambulance. Dudayev decides to kill him by the time he reaches the hospital. Using CTU's help, Nicole acquires Aisha's conversation with the Dominicans, but Aisha becomes suspicious of her and takes her cell phone before she can call Isaac, who has left for the deal.
4	"3:00 PM – 4:00 PM"	Nelson McCormick	Nikki Toscano & Nelson Greaves	February 20, 2017	1AZK04	4.42
Eric, who recognized Jadalla, asks Grimes about his lead, Gabriel, an arms dealer who provided the jihadists with guns and smuggled them into the US. Since Gabriel will demand secret military schematics in exchange for cooperation, Eric asks Mullins, who denies the proposal because of mistrusting Grimes' intentions. Ingram has Shalowitz, who knows Mullins is planning to fire him, steal the schematics, which he gives to Eric, who breaks out Grimes; and the duo escapes CTU. Meanwhile, John becomes suspicious of his father, Henry, and acquires proof that the footage of Mizrani is fake. John then confronts his father who reveals that Jadalla blackmailed him to send the information by threatening to disclose a secret deal his company made with ISIS, thus ruining John's campaign and reputation. John tells Ingram this while Luis, Henry's brother and John's uncle, encourages Henry to deny any upcoming accusations. Also, Khasan instructs Amira to inject air into Phelps' vein, hesitating first, but forced to do it, when he suddenly awakens, killing him. Elsewhere, Nicole escapes from Aisha and Jerome, overpowering them and calling Isaac in time to warn him about the betrayal. The latter forces Royo to honor the original deal. Aisha and Jerome escape before two police officers arrest Nicole. Isaac has her released by bribing them.
5	"4:00 PM – 5:00 PM"	Nelson McCormick	Robert Cochran & Leigh Dana Jackson	February 27, 2017	1AZK05	3.98
Eric gives a location to the CTU tactical team to stand by. Eric and Grimes finally meet Gabriel, who orders Eric to kill Grimes, but he refuses, impressing Gabriel, who has Grimes killed before looking at the schematics. Eric overpowers Gabriel while Locke and his operatives defeat Gabriel's men. Gabriel commits suicide. His computer begins erasing the data, but Eric stops it. Meanwhile, Mizrani is released, and Henry Donovan is brought to CTU, where he completely denies the accusations that he was responsible for the leak. Mullins suspends Shalowitz until the former can gain the evidence to fire the latter. The jihadists acquire the access code to one of the fifteen cells. Jadalla decides to wait until he can get all, which seems improbable. Kasuma secretly activates the cell, which is revealed to be Khasan's. Jadalla executes Kasuma for going behind his back. Also, Amira's father confronts her and her brother for their terrorist activities. They tie and gag him. Isaac starts investigating his men for more traitors, scaring Nicole. He dissuades Nicole from leaving.
6	"5:00 PM – 6:00 PM"	Jon Cassar	David Fury	March 6, 2017	1AZK06	3.80
Eric convinces Mullins to include him in the tactical team until they can locate and defeat the jihadists. CTU recovers Jadalla's address from the laptop. However, footage of the shootout leaks to the press, alerting Jadalla, who evacuates the facility before CTU arrives. Meanwhile, Harris arrives with his compound, which Khasan uses to complete the explosives. In an attempt to free himself and Amira, Harris shoots Khasan; but she kills Harris. Before dying, Khasan asks her to complete the mission alone. She drives the truck toward the George Washington Bridge. Mikail, her father, frees himself and alerts the police. Mullins has a highway patrol officer shoot Amira and stop the truck. However, she detonates the bombs, killing at least 100 civilians. Meanwhile, Eric sends a CTU team to acquire Nicole; but the jihadists attack the housing project, abducting her and Isaac. Jadalla calls Eric and demands that he bring a technician who can fix the drive, threatening to kill the duo.
7	"6:00 PM – 7:00 PM"	Jon Cassar	Tony Basgallop	March 13, 2017	1AZK07	3.90
Eric tells Shalowitz about the situation and convinces him to help him destroy the drive instead of repairing it, reminding him that their survival is unlikely. Shalowitz starts writing a virus, but the duo is confronted by Locke, who learns about the situation before he is overpowered and locked up. The duo heads to the exchange location, where Isaac and Nicole are released, and Eric convinces the pair to drive away. Eric and Shalowitz surrender to the jihadists, whom Jadalla orders to find and kill Isaac and Nicole. Meanwhile, Ingram convinces Mullins to let private contractors use enhanced interrogation to force Henry to cooperate. She calls Tony Almeida, her former boyfriend, for the job, while Mullins releases Henry and distracts John with a trivial debrief. Henry is abducted by Almeida's team and taken to a black site, where Ingram orders Almeida to examine Henry's health status before starting. John learns about the plan and calls Ingram, who assures him that Henry will not be harmed.
8	"7:00 PM – 8:00 PM"	Bronwen Hughes	David Fury	March 20, 2017	1AZK08	3.30
Locke frees himself and updates Mullins. Shalowitz uploads the virus, but is caught by Jadalla, who reveals that the initial drive is a decoy. Jadalla forces his compliance by torture. Meanwhile, Isaac and Nicole overpower and kill Jadalla's men. Isaac tortures the surviving member into giving Jadalla's location, which CTU also manages to pinpoint. Isaac enlists the help of his gang in rescuing Eric. The Director of National Intelligence orders a surgical air strike on the compound, which will kill everyone including Shalowitz and Eric, who recognizes one of the jihadists as Asim Naseri. Isaac and his gang arrive, attacking the jihadists and rescuing Eric moments before the air strike occurs. Shalowitz survives and secures the drive while Eric rushes off to find Jadalla, who is wounded. Eric tells Locke about the presence of Naseri, who manages to escape the perimeter. Also, Henry resists interrogation until John demands its termination, which Ingram allows after hearing the news of Jadalla's capture.
9	"8:00 PM – 9:00 PM"	Bronwen Hughes	Nikki Toscano & Zakiyyah Alexander	March 27, 2017	1AZK09	3.23
It is revealed that Naseri was Ibrahim's mole in Carter's team during the mission, and that Naseri used the cover to reach a high-value intelligence asset, whom he killed along with his family. Naseri contacts Stephen Grant, CTU head of security, demanding that he comply with Naseri's plan to free Jadalla by threatening to detonate an explosive vest attached to Jennifer Marshall, Grant's girlfriend. Not knowing about the romance, CTU tracks Marshall's house by Naseri's cell phone call. Eric's team arrives at the house and kills Naseri's female operative. Meanwhile, John decides to suspend his campaign, to Henry's objections. Grant disables the cameras and allows Naseri's team access to CTU, where John arrives in order to talk to Ingram. Eric manages to detach the bomb for a safe explosion. Marshall tells CTU about Grant, who has already freed Jadalla. Naseri's team kills Grant and secures Jadalla, encountering John on the way and abducting him too. Naseri tells Jadalla that he is working for someone else. They fight their way through an MPD roadblock and escape. Also, Mullins reinstates Shalowitz. Elsewhere, Isaac manages to bring Nicole home to her house where, while cleaning the place up, she finds some paperwork involving Eric's application to CTU.
10	"9:00 PM – 10:00 PM"	Stephen Hopkins	Manny Coto & Gabriella Goodman Seitter	April 3, 2017	1AZK10	3.20
Naseri takes Jadalla to Ibrahim, who is revealed to be alive and waiting for Jadalla to prove his worth. Ingram informs Henry about John's abduction. Henry demands help from Luis, his liaison with the jihadists. Luis wounds Henry and escapes instead. Jadalla contacts Ingram and demands that she surrender herself in order to free John. She privately informs Eric and convinces him to accompany her to the exchange location so they can kill Jadalla and Naseri. Before leaving, Eric has a dispute with Nicole after she finds out that he has been trying to join CTU. John makes an unsuccessful escape attempt. Stiles learns about Ingram's plan and informs Mullins, who contacts Almeida, who helps CTU locate Ingram. The DNI orders Mullins to secure Ingram. She and Eric overpower two MPD officers and head to the location. She forces the jihadists to free John before she surrenders. Jadalla is shot and killed by Eric, but the jihadists capture Ingram, who tells CTU about Ibrahim being alive. Meanwhile, Jennifer Marshall tells Shalowitz about a key phrase used by Naseri. Shalowitz connects the phrase to the DNI. Elsewhere, Isaac offers Nicole a new romance with him.
11	"10:00 PM – 11:00 PM"	Nelson McCormick	Leigh Dana Jackson	April 10, 2017	1AZK11	3.30
DNI Simms sends his loyal agent Daniel Pang to assume command of CTU in order to find the investigating agent, Shalowitz, who calls Eric and reveals that Simms abducted Ara, Naseri's daughter, demanding information in exchange for her life. Naseri refused, leading to Ara's apparent death. Deducing that Simms will have a lead to find Naseri, Eric informs John, who makes an appointment with Simms at the Pentagon. Posing as a Secret Service agent, Eric accompanies John to Simms' office, where Eric subdues Simms and helps Shalowitz infiltrate Simms' computer. Eric learns that Ara is alive and where she is kept, not knowing that Simms has hired Almeida to kill Ara. Entrusting Simms to John, Eric heads to the safe house, where he subdues the guards and frees Ara, whom he intends to return to Asim in exchange for Ingram. Simms tells John that Ara's initial abduction was Ingram's idea. The safe house is attacked by Almeida's team. Meanwhile, Pang gets closer to spotting Shalowitz. Mullins suffocates Pang to unconsciousness. Ingram makes a suicide attempt.
12	"11:00 PM – 12:00 PM"	Stephen Hopkins	Manny Coto & Howard Gordon	April 17, 2017	1AZK12	3.42
Eric engages Almeida's team until John is able to contact Almeida with the help of CTU. After learning of the situation, Almeida stands down. With help from Ara, Eric is able to call Naseri and offers the exchange. Naseri saves Ingram from execution and agrees to release her in exchange for Ara being taken to the Jordanian Embassy to return to her mother in Yemen. After watching Ara safely reach the embassy on a live video feed, Naseri releases Ingram before being killed by Bin-Khalid, who severely wounds Ingram when she takes a bullet for Eric, who kills Bin-Khalid and rushes Ingram to the hospital where she dies of her wounds. Twelve hours later, John mourns Ingram's death while a horrified Henry agrees to turn himself in for his crimes. While initially planning to withdraw from the Presidential race, John changes his mind after learning of Simms' suicide. Nicole accepts Eric's future as a CTU agent and decides to stay with him.

== Production ==
=== Conception ===
In January 2015, another installment of the 24 franchise was pitched by executive producers Howard Gordon, Evan Katz, Manny Coto and Brian Grazer. It revolves around a stable of supporting characters rather than Kiefer Sutherland as Jack Bauer in the lead role. In May 2015, Fox announced the continued development of a new version of 24. In June 2015, Howard Gordon stated that a spin-off would feature a new young male lead, alongside a slightly older, more experienced, female agent. Evan Katz and Manny Coto are confirmed to return as writers and executive producers. It is confirmed that this spin-off includes the "real time" feature as Gordon says it is the tradition of the show.

In January 2016, Fox announced it had ordered a pilot for a spin-off series entitled 24: Legacy, featuring a new cast with no returning characters. Although the series retains the real-time format, it consists of only 12 episodes, using time jumps to cover the events of a single day. The two lead characters are a male military hero returning home and a female who is a former head of CTU. Stephen Hopkins, who directed the original 24 pilot and several first-season episodes, directed the Legacy pilot. In April 2016, Fox officially greenlit the series with a 12-episode order. Frequent episode director Jon Cassar also returned as director and producer for Legacy, directing 6 of the 12 episodes. Sean Callery is set to return as composer for the series. Deadline reported on May 5, 2016, that Nikki Toscano had inked a deal with 20th Century Fox, and would serve as co-producer on the show. Although previously reported that no former characters would appear on the show, producers hinted at the possibility that Mary Lynn Rajskub would appear on the show as Chloe O'Brian. In an interview with Digital Spy, Katz revealed that the script for the first episode took eight months to write.

==== Appearance of Jack Bauer ====
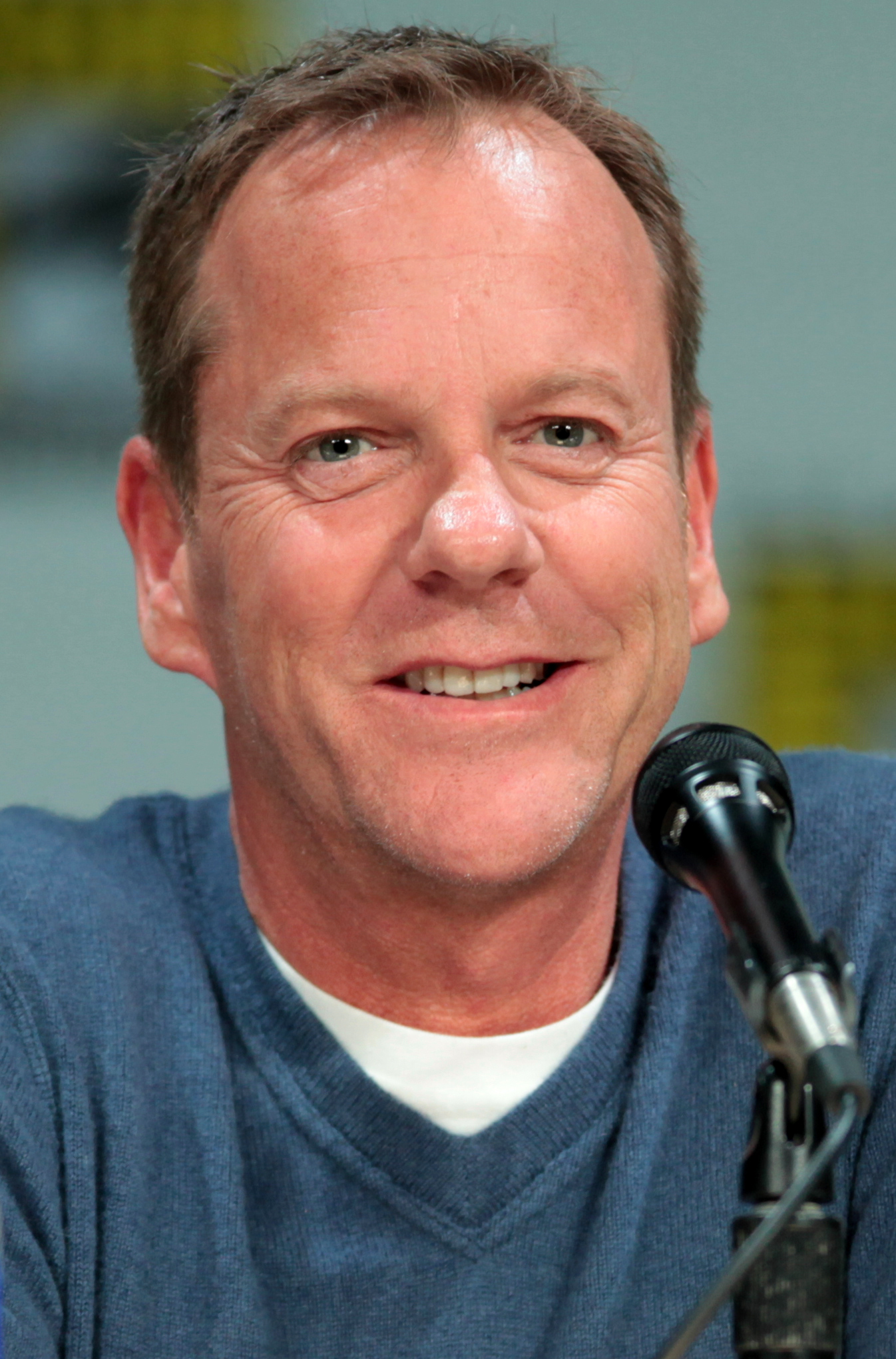
Kiefer Sutherland announced that he wouldn't appear in 24: Legacy as Jack Bauer.

In June 2015, Sutherland said, when asked about the future of Jack Bauer, "I am not coming back to do 24". Sutherland said that "24 is such a great idea, that this could go on forever". Sutherland said he felt it was important to have a new cast to refresh the series, and he hopes to maybe have a cameo in the future. In September 2015, Sutherland seemingly ruled out any further involvement with the show, stating that he would "definitely not return in any way". In February 2016, Sutherland said regarding about possibly returning to 24: "I've learned enough over the last few years to not say never. We were never going to do a season nine when we finished after the eighth season. I said we were done. So I'm going to just say we'll see." He also said regarding the Legacy pilot script that it is "really cool" and that he would be the "first person to watch it".

=== Writing ===
Katz stated in an interview that it took eight months to write the first script for the first episode. He stated that one of the difficulties was that "It had to meet people's expectations, which were high and should have been high." He also revealed that the show begins three years after the events in 24: Live Another Day and is set in Washington, D.C. The series introduces CTU's national headquarters located in Washington, D.C. CTU offices located in Los Angeles and New York City have previously been shown on 24.

In an interview with Newsday, showrunner Howard Gordon talked about the conception of the show as he said:

Manny [et al.] had an idea that was not a 24 idea, but as we talked, we thought, wow, maybe we could roll up with this character who was based on a real story—the special ops team which killed Osama bin Laden, and then came back to the states, where their identities were obscured and had a tough time adjusting. That was the premise of the character, and we realized he could be interesting with that as the focal point.

During the 2016 San Diego Comic-Con, the producers called the series "an expansion of the 24 universe," rather than a reboot of the original series. The producers revealed that they had chosen a new main character rather than Jack Bauer for the series as they felt they "had exhausted the former CTU agent's story". Executive producer Gordon commented that "The groundwork that started the series is that we all felt Jack Bauer told his story with Live Another Day. Kiefer read the script after it was written and saw the pilot after it was shot and loved it." With a presidential election plot, the producers decided to be neutral in referencing real-life presidential candidates. Evan Katz explained that "You never know who's affiliated with what. We started writing it before it was clear who the frontrunners would be, so it's really neutral in that way."

=== Casting ===
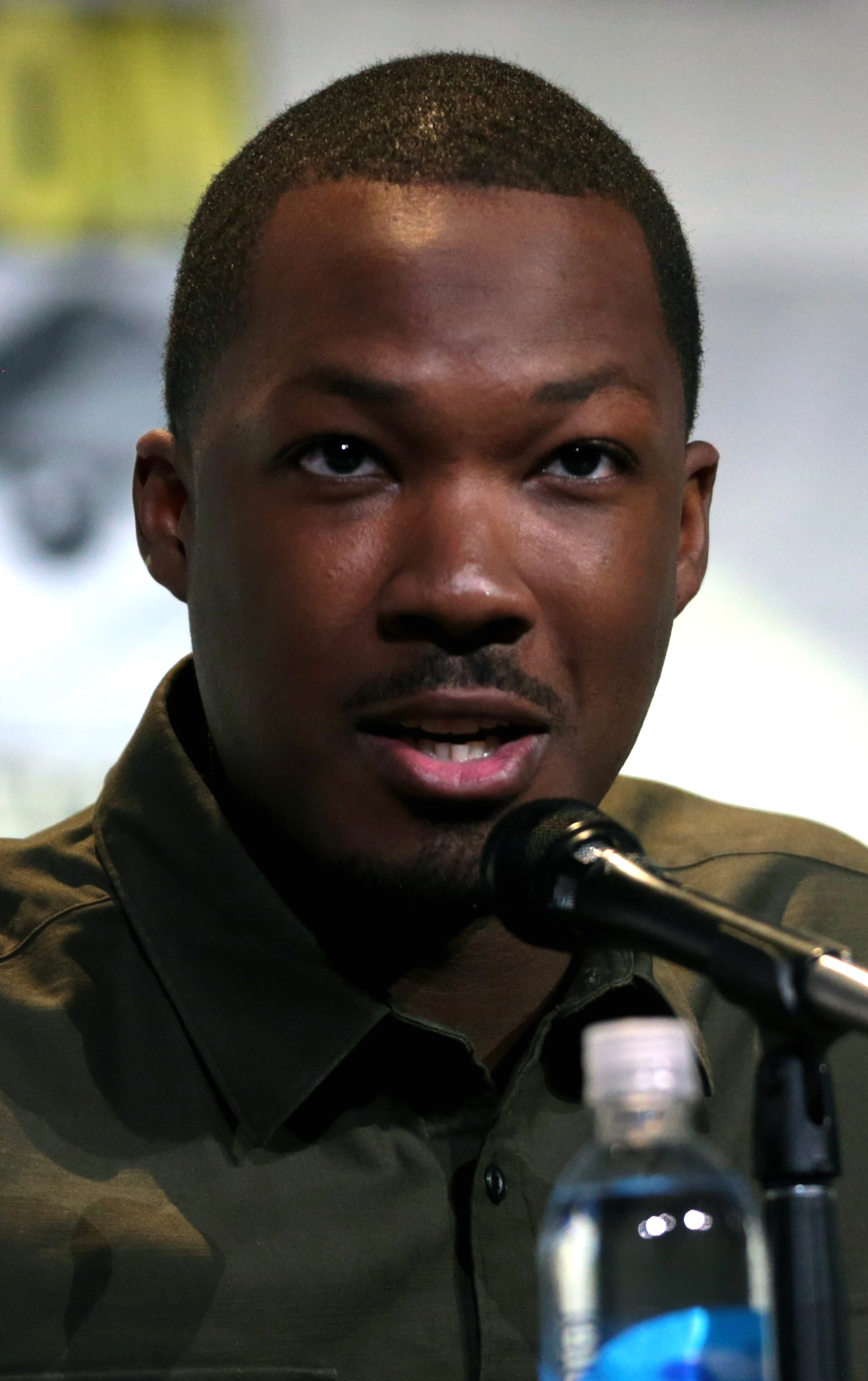
Corey Hawkins plays the male lead, Eric Carter.

The role of Eric Carter, the male lead, was announced to be portrayed by Corey Hawkins on January 25, 2016, following lengthy negotiations. Hawkins was the only actor considered for the role, after casting director Lisa Miller Katz watched his performance in Straight Outta Compton. On the same day, Miranda Otto was announced to have landed the female lead as Rebecca Ingram, the former CTU-Director. Otto immediately accepted the role when she was offered the part, stating that her reason was that she wanted a role involving "that world of CIA and terrorism," similar to her role on Homeland.

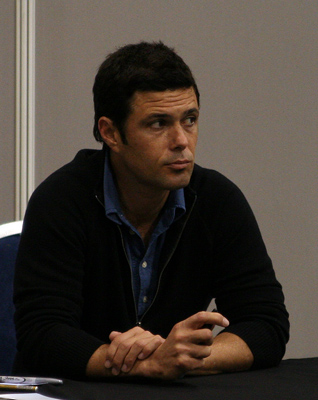
24-alum Carlos Bernard reprises his role as Tony Almeida.

In February 2016, several castings were announced. On February 16, 2016, Deadline announced that Anna Diop had joined the show as Nicole Carter, Eric's wife. A week later, Teddy Sears was announced to have been cast as Keith Mullins, the head of CTU. Several days later, TVLine reported that Jimmy Smits had landed the role as John Donovan, the husband of Rebecca Ingram and a powerful U.S. Senator with higher political aspirations. In March 2016, it was announced that Dan Bucatinsky, Coral Peña and Charlie Hofheimer had been cast for the show. Bucatinsky and Pena were cast as Andy and Gia, two communication analysts at CTU, while Hofheimer was cast as Marcus, Eric's former partner in the Army Ranger unit, now suffering PTSD. A few days later, Ashley Thomas was announced to have been cast as Isaac Carter, Eric's older brother.

The Hollywood Reporter announced on March 9, 2016, that Zayne Emory had been cast as Drew Phelps, a junior at Marshall High School, who has a crush on Amira. Sheila Vand was cast as Nilaa Mizrani, the campaign director of Sen. Donovan. It was reported on June 4, 2016, that Kathryn Prescott had been added as Amira Dudayev, and appear in a recurring role. On September 29, 2016, it was announced that Tiffany Hines and Bailey Chase had been cast in recurring roles for the series. Hines plays Aisha, Isaac Carter's girlfriend, while Chase plays Locke, the head of field operations at CTU Washington, D.C.

Variety announced on October 5, 2016, that Veronica Cartwright and Laith Nakli had been cast in a series regular and recurring role, respectively. Cartwright plays Margaret Donovan, Senator John Donovan's mother, while Nakli portrays Kusuma, a battle-hardened jihadist and fighter who is on the hunt for Eric Carter. During the press tour at New York Comic Con, the producers of the show announced that 24-alum Carlos Bernard would return as Tony Almeida in a recurring role for 24: Legacy. On October 24, 2016, Deadline announced that the show had cast Raphael Acloque and Themo Melikidze in a series regular and a recurring role, respectively. Aclogue plays Jadalla bin-Khalid, who embraces his jihadist campaign after his father's death. Melikidze plays Khasan Dudayev, the brother of Amira. On November 4, 2016, it was announced that Moran Atias had joined the show as Sidra, Tony Almeida's associate who instigates feelings of distrust between Tony and Rebecca Ingram.

=== Promotion ===
It was announced that 24: Legacy is scheduled to premiere on February 5, 2017, serving as the lead-out program for Super Bowl LI. Fox released a trailer for the series on May 16, 2016, showing footage from the first episode. A promotional poster was released on July 15, 2016. 24: Legacy appeared at the 2016 San Diego Comic-Con on July 24, 2016, with a panel featuring Corey Hawkins, Miranda Otto, Jimmy Smits, Howard Gordon, Manny Coto, and Evan Katz, where fans were among the first to view scenes from the pilot episode. The cast promoted the show and talked about what would be happening on the show. It was announced on August 8, 2016, that Fox, in partnership with Samsung, would release a virtual reality tie-in experience, written by Howard Gordon, to precede the series' February 2017 debut. On August 10, 2016, a new behind-the-scenes video was released on the show's official YouTube account.

During Fox's TCA Press Tour, the producers revealed tidbits about the show, and its future seasons, to which executive producer Evan Katz revealed that the show would only have 12 episodes per season. The cast and crew of the show promoted the show at the 2016 New York Comic Con, where they showed the first half of the premiere episode. An extended trailer for the show was released by Fox during the first game of the World Series. Fox released several new promos on October 29, 2016, showcasing new clips from the series premiere.

== Reception ==
=== Critical response ===
Review aggregator Rotten Tomatoes gives the series an approval rating of 60% based on 63 reviews, with an average rating of 5.5/10. The site's critical consensus reads, "24: Legacy offers well-acted escapism, yet this spin-off also inherits many of its predecessor's flaws, and an early narrative rut signals a missed opportunity for reinvention." On Metacritic the series has a score of 49 out of 100, based on 33 critics, indicating "mixed or average reviews".

=== Ratings ===
Viewership and ratings per episode of 24: Legacy
No.	Title	Air date	Rating/share (18–49)	Viewers (millions)	DVR (18–49)	DVR viewers (millions)	Total (18–49)	Total viewers (millions)
1	"12:00 Noon – 1:00 PM"	February 5, 2017	6.1/22	17.58	1.0	3.37	7.1	20.95
2	"1:00 PM – 2:00 PM"	February 6, 2017	1.5/5	6.22	0.8	2.80	2.3	9.03
3	"2:00 PM – 3:00 PM"	February 13, 2017	1.2/4	5.14	0.8	—N/a	2.0	—N/a
4	"3:00 PM – 4:00 PM"	February 20, 2017	1.0/4	4.42	0.7	2.17	1.7	6.59
5	"4:00 PM – 5:00 PM"	February 27, 2017	1.0/4	3.98	—N/a	—N/a	—N/a	—N/a
6	"5:00 PM – 6:00 PM"	March 6, 2017	0.9/3	3.80	0.7	2.09	1.6	5.79
7	"6:00 PM – 7:00 PM"	March 13, 2017	1.0/4	3.90	0.6	2.08	1.6	5.98
8	"7:00 PM – 8:00 PM"	March 20, 2017	0.8/3	3.30	0.6	2.01	1.4	5.31
9	"8:00 PM – 9:00 PM"	March 27, 2017	0.9/3	3.23	—N/a	1.95	—N/a	5.18
10	"9:00 PM – 10:00 PM"	April 3, 2017	0.8/3	3.20	0.5	1.83	1.3	5.03
11	"10:00 PM – 11:00 PM"	April 10, 2017	0.8/3	3.30	0.5	1.75	1.3	5.05
12	"11:00 PM – 12:00 AM"	April 17, 2017	0.8/3	3.42	0.5	1.71	1.3	5.13
