= Antiques Roadshow (American TV program) =

American television program

- Created by: BBC Television
- Developed by: WGBH-TV Boston
- Directed by: John Boyle III (current); Bill Francis (current); Susan Conover; Phillip Gay
- Presented by: Chris Jussel; Dan Elias; Lara Spencer; Mark L. Walberg
- Narrated by: Mark L. Walberg; Coral Peña
- Theme music composer: Tom Phillips
- Country of origin: United States
- Original language: English
- No. of seasons: 29

Production
- Executive producers: Marsha Bemko; Aida Moreno (1996–2001); Peter Cook (2001–2003)
- Producers: Sam Farrell; Sarah Elliott
- Cinematography: Chas Norton
- Editors: Jeff Cronenberg; Kelsey Bresnahan; Sharon Singer; Shady Hartshorne
- Camera setup: Multiple
- Running time: ca. 52:30
- Production company: WGBH-TV

Original release
- Network: PBS
- Release: January 9, 1997 – present

Related
- Antiques Roadshow FYI; Antiques Roadshow Recut; Market Warriors

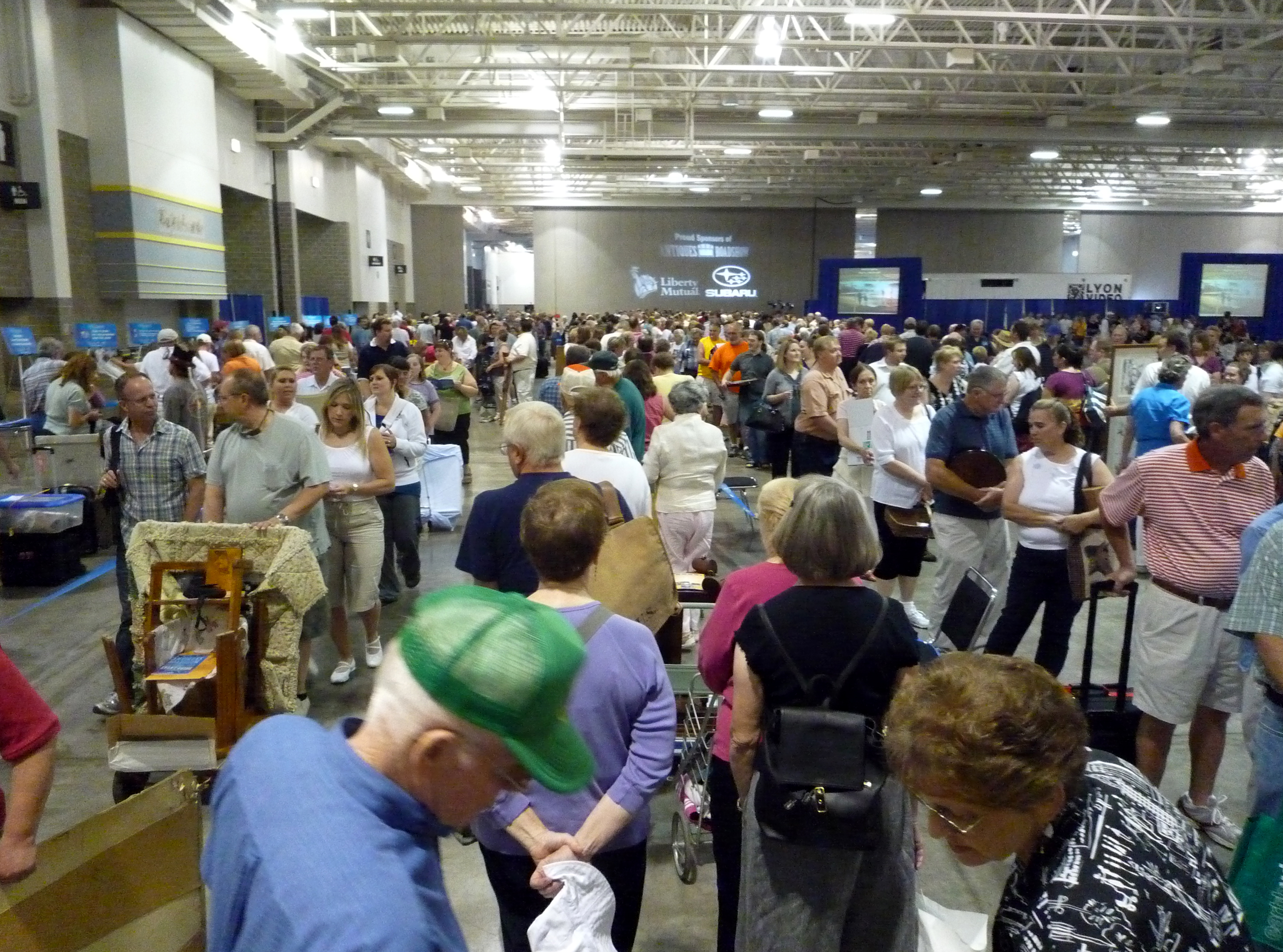
Antiques Roadshow appraises thousands of items in any given taping, with the public ticketed for time slots between 8 am and 5 pm local time; this image shows a portion of the public entering a July 2009 roadshow in Madison, Wisconsin, at noon.

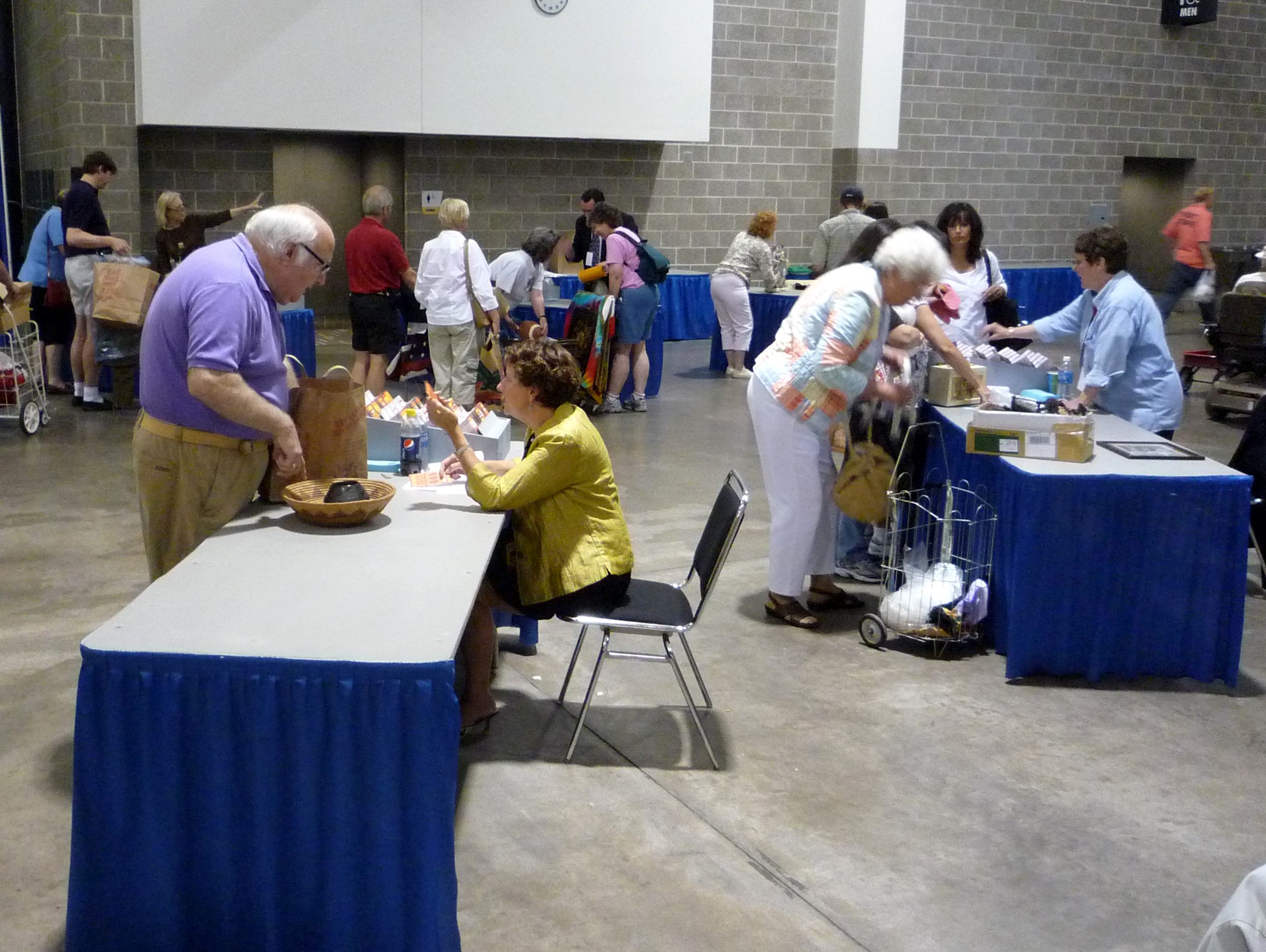
Before people enter the main appraisal/recording area, general appraisers quickly categorize and give tickets to specific appraisers (e.g. "Asian Art", "Metal Work", etc.).

Antiques Roadshow is an American television program broadcast on Public Broadcasting Service (PBS) public television stations. The program features local antiques owners who bring in items to be appraised by experts. Provenance, history, and value of the items are discussed. Based on the original British Antiques Roadshow, which premiered in 1979, the American version first aired in 1997. From 1997 to 2018, its episodes were filmed indoors at facilities such as convention centers and ballrooms; late in the 2018 season, it switched to filming at historic sites and museums, with most or all appraisals taking place outdoors. Antiques Roadshow has been nominated 24 times for a Primetime Emmy and won in 2026.

A spin-off of the American version of Antiques Roadshow called Antiques Roadshow FYI, a half-hour program that followed the fate of items appraised in the parent show and provided additional information on antiques and collecting, aired for a single season during 2005. Another spinoff, Antiques Roadshow Recut, premiered in 2020, ran until 2022, and returned to the air in 2024; it consists of 30-minute episodes, each drawn from a full-length Antiques Roadshow episode from an earlier season.

== History ==
Antiques Roadshow is the American version of the British Broadcasting Corporation program of the same name, which premiered as a special in 1977 and began airing as a regular series in the United Kingdom in 1979. The public television station in Boston, Massachusetts, WGBH-TV, created the American version in 1996 under a license from the BBC.

== Release ==
The first American episodes were taped in 1996 and broadcast on PBS in 1997. WGBH-TV produces the show. In 2001, PBS began airing the original BBC version of Antiques Roadshow in the United States. In the United States, the BBC version is titled Antiques Roadshow UK to differentiate it from the American version.

== Hosts ==
The first host of the American version of Antiques Roadshow was antiques expert Chris Jussel. He hosted the program from 1997 to 2000 (Seasons 1 through 4). He was followed by contemporary art expert Dan Elias, who took over after Jussel's departure and hosted the program from 2001 to 2003 (Seasons 5 through 7). Good Morning America correspondent Lara Spencer replaced Elias as the host, and she hosted from 2004 to 2005 (Seasons 8 and 9). Actor, television personality, and game show host Mark L. Walberg hosted the program from 2006 to 2019 (Seasons 10 through 23). Actress Coral Peña, billed as the narrator rather than host, has narrated the show since Season 24, which was broadcast in 2020.

== Overview ==
=== Seasons 1–19 ===
During the first 19 seasons (1997–2015), each episode began with an on-camera introduction by the host (Chris Jussel, Dan Elias, Lara Spencer, and Mark L. Walberg) followed by footage of the taping location while the host identified the location – a hotel ballroom, convention center, civic arena, or similar facility – in a voiceover. The taping in each city was split into three one-hour episodes, e.g., "Boise Hour 1", "Chattanooga Hour 2", or "Raleigh Hour 3". Various two-to four-minute-long segments of people talking about their item(s) and their appraisers talking about the provenance, history, and value of the item(s) followed, interspersed with several brief informal appraisals, lasting about a minute or so and called "over-the-shoulder appraisals".

In a several-minute "field segment" about halfway through each episode, the host joined one of the show's appraisers to tour a museum or historic site near the episode's taping location, where the appraiser discussed antiques at the site with the host and estimated their value. Each episode ended with the host wrapping things up on camera. In the show's early seasons, the episodes ended with the Antiques Roadshow crew getting ready to turn the studio lights off and taking down the set. In later seasons, the closing credits featuring the crew taking down the set was discontinued, and was replaced by a "Feedback Booth", a series of clips of people talking about their experience at Antiques Roadshow that rolls during the credits. A "Hidden Treasures" segment consisting of two additional appraisals followed the credits.

=== Seasons 20–22 ===
In Season 20, which aired in 2016, a format change occurred. Although the conventional and "over-the-shoulder" appraisals and the Feedback Booth continued as before, the show adopted a new logo, new graphics for its opening and closing credits, and a new set, and the role of the host was reduced significantly. Segments in which the host appeared on camera were discontinued, and instead the host introduced and closed each episode in a voiceover. The mid-show field segment featuring the host and an appraiser at a local museum or historic site was dropped. In addition, each episode included several quick "snapshot" appraisals; in this new type of appraisal, no appraiser appeared on camera, and instead a guest quickly described their object to the camera and a still image of the object followed that included a graphic of the object's appraised value. The Feedback Booth survived, but the post-episode "Hidden Treasures" segment disappeared for a time, although it later returned. The taping in each city continued to be split into three one-hour episodes.

In 2016, Antiques Roadshow executive producer Marsha Bemko explained the reasons for the Season 20 changes. The old set, in use since the filming of Season 9 in 2004, had reached the end of its useful life and employed what she viewed as outdated graphics generated using outdated technology, so she used the design and construction of a new set to allow the show to incorporate more modern graphics. The new logo employed the new set's graphics as did the opening credits, which also were changed to reflect a feeling of Antiques Roadshow traveling along a road, in contrast to the old credit sequence's static depiction of objects in an attic. Antiques Roadshow had found that its viewers tended to tune out during the mid-show field segment and preferred to watch appraisals, and dropping the field segment and adding "snapshot" appraisals kept viewers watching and allowed them to see about a dozen additional appraisals per episode.

=== Season 23 to present ===
The last three episodes of Season 22 (taped in 2017 and televised in 2018) unveiled another format change which became the standard format for all episodes beginning with Season 23, televised in 2019. As the British version of the show had done over a decade earlier, Antiques Roadshow moved from taping episodes in convention centers, ballrooms, and civic centers to taping them at historic sites and museums, including the first outdoor segments ever recorded for the show. Interspersed among the standard, over-the-shoulder, and snapshot appraisals were brief vignettes describing the history and features of the historic site or museum or discussing people who had once lived in or had founded or funded the site. Although the host (Mark Walberg during Seasons 22 and 23) remained entirely off camera throughout each episode, he served as a narrator for these segments in addition to opening and closing each episode. The Feedback Booth and Hidden Treasures segments continued to air at the end of each episode, and taping at each site was still split into three one-hour episodes.

Although it remained popular – drawing a cumulative audience of 8 million per week – and enjoyed significant support among PBS donors, the show's viewership measured by household season average had declined 5 percent from the 2016–2017 television season to the 2017–2018 season and 21 percent since the 2012–2013 season, probably because its long-running format was beginning to become stale. Bemko explained in 2018 that the new format, in combination with the changes made for Season 20 three years earlier, was designed to refresh the show and improve its pacing.

Walberg left the show after Season 23 aired in 2019. Coral Peña took over the job of performing each episode's voiceovers in Season 24, broadcast in 2020, and she is billed as the show's narrator rather than its host.

The 2020 tour, which would have been filmed for new episodes to air in 2021, was cancelled due to the COVID-19 pandemic. Instead, Antiques Roadshow appraisers visited various celebrities during 2020 to discuss and appraise their antiques, resulting in four new episodes with this format. With no other new footage available, Season 25, which aired in 2021, otherwise consisted entirely of specials made up of clips from earlier seasons.

The 2021 tour, filmed for broadcast in 2022, returned to appraisals of the antiques of everyday people, but not to appraisal segments filmed during crowded events. Due to the COVID-19 pandemic, guests at each tour stop were invited to have their appraisals filmed on a closed set. The Feedback Booth – which previously featured guests who had not appeared on camera during the tour stop – returned, but consisted solely of guests whose appraisals had appeared in the episode.

== Spinoffs ==
=== Antiques Roadshow FYI ===
During 2005, PBS broadcast Antiques Roadshow FYI, a magazine-style spinoff of Antiques Roadshow. Then-Antiques Roadshow host Lara Spencer also hosted Antiques Roadshow FYI, a weekly half-hour show which provided information on items shown on episodes of Antiques Roadshow as well as additional information on antiques and collecting provided by Antiques Roadshow appraisers.

Each episode began with a "Roadshow Updates" segment which featured an object appraised on Antiques Roadshow and revealed what had happened to it since its appraisal. In "Fascinating Features" segments, correspondent Clay Reynolds traveled around the United States, either visiting antique shows, auctions, thrift stores, and flea markets to provide a behind-the-scenes look at the world of antiques or profiling collectors and collectibles. In "Tips" segments, Antiques Roadshow appraisers provided expert advice on antiques and collectibles, including information about the antiques market, auctions, antiques dealers, and appraisals. Each episode concluded with a "Missing Masterpieces" segment in which an Antiques Roadshow appraiser told a legendary story of a great object that had disappeared. The February 9 episode had a romantic theme to tie it in with that year's upcoming Valentine's Day holiday, and the May 4 episode focused on the macabre in antiques. In the September 7 episode, former Antiques Roadshow host Chris Jussel provided the story for the final "Missing Masterpieces" segment.

Antiques Roadshow FYI premiered on January 19, 2005. Twenty-six episodes aired, the last of them on September 7, 2005. WGBH-TV in Boston produced Antiques Roadshow FYI, and Marsha Bemko was its executive producer.

=== Antiques Roadshow Recut ===
On January 3, 2020, the spinoff series Antiques Roadshow Recut premiered on PBS, serving as one of the replacement programs for Nightly Business Report, which aired its final episode in December 2019. Antiques Roadshow Recut aired from 2020 through 2022, then returned to the air in 2024. Its 30-minute episodes consist of footage from full-length Antiques Roadshow episodes from previous seasons, "recut" to provide a fast-paced series of appraisals. Like a full-length Antiques Roadshow episode, each episode of Antiques Roadshow Recut concludes with a "Feedback Booth" segment, followed by a "Hidden Treasures" segment after the closing credits.

== Production ==
Each spring and summer – except in 2020, when the COVID-19 pandemic forced its cancellation – the Antiques Roadshow production team and appraisers make an annual tour, visiting various cities in the United States. (In 1999 the tour made its only foreign stop, visiting Canada to film in Toronto, Ontario.) The local PBS station usually serves as host for each tour stop. Taping in each location lasts one day, and episodes drawn from that day are broadcast the following year.

During the first 21 seasons and for most of the 22nd season, production followed a routine, predictable pattern, with all taping occurring indoors in a convention center, hotel ballroom, civic arena, or similar venue. The production team selected cities for the annual tour based on several factors, including the requirement of a minimum of 80,000 square feet (7,400 m^{2}) of space to accommodate the tour event. Most filming in these venues could be accomplished by placing cameras in a central location and simply spinning them around to capture various appraisals.

In 2017, when during the 22nd season the show moved to taping at museums and historic sites and began recording outdoor appraisals for the first time, production became more complicated. The venues were far more variable than convention centers and ballrooms and cameras, rather than operating mostly from a central location, were required to roam the venue to capture appraisals at various locations around the property. The move to outdoor appraisals required contingency planning in case of bad weather. Preproduction work also became more extensive and demanding. Producers had a large database of convention centers, ballrooms, and civic centers suitable for Antiques Roadshow that they had accumulated in earlier years, but had no familiarity with museums and historic sites or their availability or suitability for an Antiques Roadshow tour stop, and negotiations with owners and proprietors of taping sites also sometimes were more complicated than those with convention centers or ballroom venues. Executive producer Marsha Bemko credited the producers of the BBC version of the show, which had been taping at historic sites and outdoors for over a decade by the time the American show began to do it, for playing an important role as advisers to her team as the American show switched to the new format.

Tickets to attend each tour stop are free, but are provided only to preselected people and on a random basis. Tickets are not available at the tour venue on the day of event. To request tickets, prospective appraisees must fill out a form on the show's official website. Each visitor is guaranteed a free appraisal, whether or not their appraisal is recorded for television. During the years of visiting convention centers, ballrooms, and civic centers Antiques Roadshow distributed 5,000 tickets at each tour stop. During the first tour visiting museums and historic sites, the number of tickets was cut back to 2,500 per tour stop, although visitors were allowed to bring two items each so that the number of appraisals did not drop. In later years, the number of tickets per stop increased again.

Upon arrival on filming day, each visitor checks in at a designated time and is directed to a line to wait in to see an appraiser who can assess their object. At each tour stop, about 150 of the 5,000 appraisals are filmed, and of these about 30 eventually appear on television. If an appraiser chooses an object for filming, the visitor may wait between 30 minutes and two hours before their segment is filmed.

Regardless of whether taping occurs indoors at convention centers, ballrooms, and civic centers or outdoors at museums and historic sites, the number of new episodes broadcast the following season depends on the number of locations visited on the annual tour. A five-location tour usually results in 24 to 26 new episodes the following season.

== Appraisers ==
About 70 appraisers work at each tour stop. They are volunteers; Antiques Roadshow does not pay them for their services, nor does it compensate them for any of their travel expenses, providing them only with a free breakfast and lunch on each filming day. Appraisers neither buy nor sell items during an Antiques Roadshow tour stop.

Only three producers are on site for any tour stop, and although they circulate to identify items that may be of interest on the show, seeking objects which probably will be the most entertaining to air on the program regardless of their assessed value, they rely heavily on the appraisers to find interesting objects and pitch them to the producers as worthy of filming. Appraisers thus play a vital role in determining which objects are filmed for potential use in an Antiques Roadshow episode. Given the amount of money they spend on travel to participate in an Antiques Roashow tour – often over $10,000 in 2019 – and the lack of compensation for them by the show, the appraisers have an incentive to get a return on their investment by finding television-worthy objects and getting on camera in the hope of benefiting from the resulting national exposure. Typically, an appraiser gives their initial appraisal of an object to the visitor based on knowledge he or she already has, but appraisers usually take advantage of the delay between identifying an object of interest for television and the filming of a segment on it to conduct further research to find additional interesting information on the object and to make sure he or she has the details about it right for the filmed appraisal.

As of the 2024 tour, which filmed appraisals for broadcast in Season 29 during 2025, WGBH-TV listed 425 appraisers who have taken part in Antiques Roadshow tours over the history of the show.

=== Fraud incidents (1997–2001) ===
In 1999, a jury awarded a descendant of Confederate Army General George Pickett a US$800,000 judgment (equivalent to $1.5 million in 2025) against military artifacts dealer Russ Pritchard III, who appeared on Antiques Roadshow as an appraiser, for fraudulently undervaluing Pickett memorabilia, purchasing the items, and then reselling them at a large profit. At the time, Antiques Roadshow producers decided to keep Pritchard on the show, believing that the jury award did not have an impact on his ability to appraise items on Antiques Roadshow. In March 2000, however, revelations that both Pritchard and George Juno – another military artifacts dealer and Antiques Roadshow appraiser and Pritchard's business partner at the company American Ordnance Preservation Association – had staged a fraudulent appraisal in 1997 led the show to sever ties with them. In March 2001, the two men were accused of using their Antiques Roadshow appearances to establish a reputation as experts in American Civil War artifacts and memorabilia by making phony appraisals designed to lure unsuspecting owners of Civil War antiques to do business with their company, subsequently defrauding their victims of hundreds of thousands of dollars. Both men were indicted in March 2001 on charges of wire fraud, mail fraud, witness tampering, and giving false testimony, and additional indictments followed as other fraudulent activities came to light. Juno pleaded guilty in May 2001, as did Pritchard in December 2001. Both were sentenced to prison terms in 2002.

== Highest appraisals ==
The following ten items are recognized as the most valuable items featured on the American Antiques Roadshow:

- In the first season (filmed 1996 in Secaucus, New Jersey), a John Seymour & Son card table, an example of 18th century federal furniture, was appraised at $200,000–$300,000; the piece was sold at auction, a few months later, for $541,500.
- A season 17 episode (filmed 2012 in Corpus Christi, Texas) featured a 1904 Diego Rivera oil painting, El Albañil, appraised at $800,000 to $1 million. In a 2018 Antiques Roadshow special, the original appraiser acknowledged changes in the market for works by Rivera, and updated the appraisal to a value of $1.2 million to $2.2 million.
- On July 23, 2011, a collection of Chinese cups carved from rhinoceros horns, believed to date from the late 17th or early 18th century, was valued at $1–1.5 million by Lark E. Mason, at a show location in Tulsa, Oklahoma.
- Four pieces of Chinese carved jade and celadon ceramics dating to the reign of the Qianlong Emperor (1736–1795), including a large bowl crafted for the emperor, were given a conservative auction estimate of up to $1.07 million by Asian arts appraiser, James Callahan. However the items sold at auction for only $494,615.
- A trove of 1870s Boston Red Stockings (now the Atlanta Braves) memorabilia including players' signatures and rare baseball cards was appraised at $1,000,000 for insurance purposes in New York City on January 5, 2015, by Leila Dunbar.
- An Alexander Calder mobile, c. 1950, was appraised in Miami, Florida, at $400,000 to $1,000,000 by Chris Kennedy.
- A 1937 Clyfford Still oil painting, valued at $500,000, was appraised by Alasdair Nichol on the first episode of its 13th season on January 5, 2009.
- A Norman Rockwell oil painting was appraised at $500,000 in 2010 in Eugene, Oregon by painting and drawings expert Nan Chisholm.
- An unused 1971 Rolex Oyster Daytona Chronograph was valued at $500,000–700,000 in January 2020 at West Fargo, North Dakota.
- An Andrew Wyeth watercolor painting was appraised at $450,000 in Raleigh, North Carolina, in 2010, by Nan Chisholm.
- A season 14 episode (filmed 2009 at a stop in Phoenix, Arizona) featured a collection of Charles Schulz' Peanuts comic strip art, which was appraised at $450,000.
- In 2001, a mid-19th-century Navajo Ute First Phase blanket, believed once to have been owned by Kit Carson, was valued in Tucson, Arizona between $350,000 and $500,000; the appraiser, Donald Ellis, called it a "national treasure".
- A season 9 episode (filmed 2004 in St. Paul, Minnesota) featured a 1914 Patek Philippe pocketwatch, appraised at $250,000; after the manufacturer provided further research, discovering that the watch was a one-off production, it was re-appraised at $2–3 million.
- In 2022, a Chinese celadon dragon charger from the Yongzheng period was valued between $80,000 and $120,000 in Hamilton, New Jersey; the appraiser, Richard Cervantes of Doyle New York, called it an "absolute masterpiece". At auction that same year, the piece sold for $390,000.

== Seasons ==
Note: Locations are presented in alphabetical order, not in the chronological order of the season's tour stops.

Season	Host	Filmed	Broadcast
1	Chris Jussel	1996	1997
Locations: Albuquerque, New Mexico; Chicago, Illinois; College Park, Maryland; Concord, Massachusetts; Denver, Colorado; Durham, North Carolina; Greenwich, Connecticut; Kansas City, Missouri; Minneapolis, Minnesota; Philadelphia, Pennsylvania; San Antonio, Texas; Seattle, Washington; Southfield, Michigan
Notes: Jussel began a four-season run as the original host of Antiques Roadshow. The 13 tour stops remain the most ever for a season.
2	Chris Jussel	1997	1998
Locations: Atlanta, Georgia; Cincinnati, Ohio; Dallas, Texas; Nashville, Tennessee; Phoenix, Arizona; Pittsburgh, Pennsylvania; San Francisco, California; Secaucus, New Jersey
3	Chris Jussel	1998	1999
Locations: Houston, Texas; Los Angeles, California; Louisville, Kentucky; Milwaukee, Wisconsin; Portland, Oregon; Richmond, Virginia; Rochester, New York
4	Chris Jussel	1999	2000
Locations: Baltimore, Maryland; Birmingham, Alabama; Columbus, Ohio; Des Moines, Iowa; Providence, Rhode Island; Salt Lake City, Utah; Tampa, Florida; Toronto, Ontario, Canada
Notes: Jussel's last season as host, concluding a four-season run. The visit to Toronto remains Antiques Roadshow′s only tour stop outside the United States.
5	Dan Elias	2000	2001
Locations: Austin, Texas; Charleston, South Carolina; Denver, Colorado; Las Vegas, Nevada; Madison, Wisconsin; Sacramento, California; St. Louis, Missouri; Tulsa, Oklahoma
Notes: Elias's first season as host, beginning a three-season run. Antiques Roadshow also made a tour stop in Boston, Massachusetts, in 2000, but did not broadcast footage from it until 2002. The Denver tour stop marked Antiques Roadshow′s first return to a city it had visited previously. (The show had made a stop in Denver in 1996 for broadcast in Season 1 in 1997.)
6	Dan Elias	2000–2001	2002
Locations: Boston, Massachusetts; Indianapolis, Indiana; Miami, Florida; New Orleans, Louisiana; New York, New York; San Diego, California; Tucson, Arizona
Notes: The Boston episodes were filmed in 2000, the rest in 2001.
7	Dan Elias	2002	2003
Locations: Albuquerque, New Mexico; Charlotte, North Carolina; Cleveland, Ohio; Hot Springs, Arkansas; Kansas City, Missouri; Seattle, Washington
Notes: Elias's last season as host, concluding a three-season run.
8	Lara Spencer	2003	2004
Locations: Chicago, Illinois; Oklahoma City, Oklahoma; San Francisco, California; Savannah, Georgia
Specials: "Greatest Finds"; "Roadshow Favorites"
Notes: Spencer's first season as host, beginning a two-season run. The season was the first to include specials. The four tour stops remain the fewest ever in a season of Antiques Roadshow except for the 2021 season, which had no tour stops because off the cancellation of the 2020 tour during the COVID-19 pandemic.
9	Lara Spencer	2004	2005
Locations: Memphis, Tennessee; Omaha, Nebraska; Portland, Oregon; Reno, Nevada; St. Paul, Minnesota
Specials: "Tomorrow's Antiques"; "Wild Things!"
Antiques Roadshow FYI: Magazine-style 26-episode spinoff series
Notes: Spencer's last season as host, concluding a two-season run. From January to September 2005, she also hosted the only season of the spinoff series Antiques Roadshow FYI.
10	Mark Walberg	2005	2006
Locations: Bismarck, North Dakota; Houston, Texas; Los Angeles, California; Providence, Rhode Island; Tampa, Florida
Specials: "Fame and Fortune"; "Roadshow Remembers"
Notes: Walberg's first season as host, beginning a 14-season run.
11	Mark Walberg	2006	2007
Locations: Honolulu, Hawaii; Milwaukee, Wisconsin; Mobile, Alabama; Salt Lake City, Utah; Tucson, Arizona
Specials: "Jackpot!"; "Unique Antiques"
Notes: The Honolulu visit remains Antiques Roadshow′s only tour stop outside North America.
12	Mark Walberg	2007	2008
Locations: Baltimore, Maryland; Las Vegas, Nevada; Louisville, Kentucky; Orlando, Florida; San Antonio, Texas; Spokane, Washington
Specials: "Politically Collect"; "Trash to Treasure"
13	Mark Walberg	2008	2009
Locations: Chattanooga, Tennessee; Dallas, Texas; Grand Rapids, Michigan; Hartford, Connecticut; Palm Springs, California; Wichita, Kansas
Specials: "Big and Little"; "Relative Riches"
14	Mark Walberg	2009	2010
Locations: Atlantic City, New Jersey; Denver, Colorado; Madison, Wisconsin; Hartford, Connecticut; Raleigh, North Carolina; San Jose, California
Specials: "Naughty or Nice"; "Simply the Best"
15	Mark Walberg	2010	2011
Locations: Billings, Montana; Biloxi, Mississippi; Des Moines, Iowa; Miami Beach, Florida; San Diego, California; Washington, D.C.
Specials: "Forever Young"; "Junk in the Trunk"; "Tasty Treasures"
Notes: The season introduced the annual "Junk in the Trunk" specials, which consist of appraisals made during the season's tour stops that were not included in the episodes for those tour stops.
16	Mark Walberg	2011	2012
Locations: Atlanta, Georgia; El Paso, Texas; Eugene, Oregon; Minneapolis, Minnesota; Pittsburgh, Pennsylvania; Tulsa, Oklahoma
Specials: "Cats & Dogs"; "Greatest Gifts"; "Junk in the Trunk 2"
Vintage Episodes: "Vintage Atlanta"; "Vintage Houston"; "Vintage Phoenix"; "Vintage Pittsburgh"; "Vintage San Francisco"; "Vintage Secaucus"
Notes: The season introduced "Vintage" episodes, each of which repeated an episode from an earlier season and compared each original appraisal with an update of the object's appraised value.
17	Mark Walberg	2012	2013
Locations: Boston, Massachusetts; Cincinnati, Ohio; Corpus Christi, Texas; Myrtle Beach, South Carolina; Rapid City, South Dakota; Seattle, Washington
Specials: "Finders Keepers"; "Junk in the Trunk 3"; "Survivors"
Vintage Episodes: "Vintage Hartford"; "Vintage Los Angeles"; "Vintage Louisville"; "Vintage Milwaukee"; "Vintage Richmond"; "Vintage Rochester"
18	Mark Walberg	2013	2014
Locations: Anaheim, California; Baton Rouge, Louisiana; Boise, Idaho; Detroit, Michigan; Jacksonville, Florida; Kansas City, Missouri; Knoxville, Tennessee; Richmond, Virginia
Specials: "The Boomer Years"; "Junk in the Trunk 4.1"; "Junk in the Trunk 4.2"; "Manor House Treasures"
Vintage Episodes: "Vintage Baltimore"; "Vintage Columbus"; "Vintage Des Moines"; "Vintage Providence"; "Vintage Salt Lake City"; "Vintage Tampa"; "Vintage Toronto"
19	Mark Walberg	2014	2015
Locations: Albuquerque, New Mexico; Austin, Texas; Birmingham, Alabama; Bismarck, North Dakota; Charleston, West Virginia; Chicago, Illinois; Santa Clara, California
Specials: "Celebrating Black Americana"; "Junk in the Trunk 5.1"; "Junk in the Trunk 5.2"; "Treasures on the Move"
Vintage Episodes: "Vintage Charleston"; "Vintage Denver"; "Vintage Las Vegas"; "Vintage Madison"; "Vintage Sacramento"; "Vintage St. Louis"; "Vintage Tulsa"
Notes: The last season in which the host appeared on camera, and the last to include a weekly mid-show field segment in which the host toured a local museum or historic site with one of the appraisers to discuss and appraise antiques.
20	Mark Walberg	2015	2016
Locations: Charleston, South Carolina; Cleveland, Ohio; Little Rock, Arkansas; Omaha, Nebraska; Spokane, Washington; Tucson, Arizona
Specials: "The Best of 20"; "Celebrating Asian-Pacific Heritage"; "Junk in the Trunk 6"; "Mansion Masterpieces"
Vintage Episodes: "Vintage Boston"; "Vintage Indianapolis"; "Vintage Miami"; "Vintage New Orleans"; "Vintage New York"; "Vintage San Diego"; "Vintage Tucson"
Notes: The show adopted a new logo, new set, new graphics, and new opening credits and unveiled a new format in which the host provided voiceovers at the show's beginning and end but did not appear on camera or otherwise speak during the show. The weekly mid-show field segment was discontinued, and brief "snapshot" appraisals of items of lesser value debuted.
21	Mark Walberg	2016	2017
Locations: Fort Worth, Texas; Indianapolis, Indiana; Orlando, Florida; Palm Springs, California; Salt Lake City, Utah; Virginia Beach, Virginia
Specials: "The Civil War Years"; "Junk in the Trunk 7"; "Our 50 States Part One"; "Our 50 States Part Two"
Vintage Episodes: "Vintage Albuquerque"; "Vintage Austin"; "Vintage Charlotte"; "Vintage Cleveland"; "Vintage Hot Springs"; "Vintage Kansas City"; "Vintage Seattle"
22	Mark Walberg	2017	2018
Locations: Green Bay, Wisconsin; Harrisburg, Pennsylvania; New Orleans, Louisiana; Portland, Oregon; St. Louis, Missouri; Rosecliff, Newport, Rhode Island
Specials: "Celebrating Latino Heritage"; "Junk in the Trunk 8"; "Kooky & Spooky"; "Somethings Wild"
Vintage Episodes: "Vintage Birmingham"; "Vintage Chicago"; "Vintage Oklahoma City"; "Vintage Omaha"; "Vintage Portland"; "Vintage San Francisco"; "Vintage Savannah"
Notes: The last season to include tour stops filmed at facilities such as convention centers, civic centers, or ballrooms. The final three episodes, filmed in Newport and shot inside and on the grounds of Rosecliff, unveiled a new format in which the show was taped for the first time at a historic house, and included appraisals taped outdoors for the first time, although plans for all the appraisals to take place outdoors were spoiled by rain generated by Hurricane Jose offshore, and most of the appraisals took place inside the mansion or in tents erected on the mansion's grounds. Another new feature of the Newport episodes was the interspersing among appraisals of frequent pauses for segments narrated off-camera by the host about the mansion's construction, history, and features, as well as those of neighboring mansions.
23	Mark Walberg	2018	2019
Locations: Meadow Brook Hall, Rochester Hills, Michigan; Ca' d'Zan, Sarasota, Florida; Hotel del Coronado, Coronado, California; Philbrook Museum of Art, Tulsa, Oklahoma; Churchill Downs, Louisville, Kentucky
Specials: "Extraordinary Finds"; "The Gen X Years"; "Junk in the Trunk 9"; "Out of this World"
Vintage Episodes: "Vintage Bismarck"; "Vintage Houston 2019"; "Vintage Memphis"; "Vintage Providence 2019"; "Vintage Reno"; "Vintage St. Paul"; "Vintage Tampa 2019"
Notes: Walberg's last season as host, ending a 14-season run. The format introduced with the previous season's Newport episodes became standard for all episodes, with each tour stop taking place at an historic site or museum and many or all of the appraisals taking place outdoors, separated by brief segments narrated off-camera by the host relating facts about the features and history of the site itself and its surroundings. The Churchill Downs episodes were broadcast in May 2019 to give them a tie-in with the 2019 Kentucky Derby, which was run that month at Churchill Downs. For the first time, the season's "Vintage" episodes included taping locations featured in a "Vintage" episode broadcast during a previous season, denoting these by including the year of the current season's "Vintage" broadcast (i.e., 2019 this season) in the episode's title. The season also introduced the "Extraordinary Finds" series of specials, in which people who had had objects appraised on Antiques Roadshow returned for an interview with the appraiser, an appraisal update, and a discussion of what happened after the object's original appraisal. The first "Extraordinary Finds" episode, which aired on November 4, 2019, was the 500th episode of Antiques Roadshow.
24	Coral Peña	2019	2020
Locations: Desert Botanical Garden, Phoenix, Arizona; McNay Art Museum, San Antonio, Texas; Crocker Art Museum, Sacramento, California; Bonanzaville, USA, West Fargo, North Dakota; Winterthur Museum, Garden and Library, Winterthur, Delaware
Specials: "Election Collection"; "Junk in the Trunk 10"; "Treasure Fever"; "Women's Work"
Vintage Episodes: "Vintage Honolulu"; "Vintage Los Angeles 2020"; "Vintage Milwaukee"; "Vintage Mobile"; "Vintage Philadelphia 2020"; "Vintage Salt Lake City"
Antiques Roadshow Recut, Season 1: "Recut: Politically Collect, Part 1"; "Recut: Politically Collect, Part 2"; "Recut Newport, Part 1"; "Recut Newport, Part 2"; "Recut Newport, Part 3"; "Recut Newport, Part 4"; "Recut Newport, Part 5"; "Recut Newport, Part 6"
Notes: Coral Peña′s first season as narrator, the title of "host" having been dropped with Walberg's departure at the end of the previous season. Antiques Roadshow Recut, a spin-off of Antiques Roadshow, premiered this season; each Recut episode was 30 minutes long and consisted of material previously broadcast in a full-length episode of Antiques Roadshow of the same name during an earlier season.
25	Coral Peña	2020	2021
Locations: The planned tour was cancelled. It would have made five stops: Boston Public Library, Boston, Massachusetts; The Stanley Hotel, Estes Park, Colorado; Cheekwood Botanical Garden and Museum of Art, Nashville, Tennessee; Milner Plaza at Museum Hill, Santa Fe, New Mexico; Colonial Williamsburg, Williamsburg, Virginia
Specials: "American Stories"; "Best Bargains"; "Body of Work"; "Celebrating 25 Years"; "Extraordinary Finds 2"; "Modern Icons"; "Tearjerkers"; "True Colors"
Vintage Episodes: "Vintage Baltimore 2021, Hour 1"; "Vintage Baltimore 2021, Hour 2"; "Vintage Las Vegas 2021, Hour 1"; "Vintage Las Vegas 2021, Hour 2"; "Vintage Louisville 2021, Hour 1"; "Vintage Louisville 2021, Hour 2"; "Vintage Orlando, Hour 1"; "Vintage Orlando, Hour 2"; "Vintage Spokane, Hour 1"; "Vintage Spokane, Hour 2"; "Vintage Tucson 2021, Hour 1"; "Vintage Tucson 2021, Hour 2"; "Vintage Wichita"
Antiques Roadshow Recut, Season 2: "Recut: American Stories, Part 1"; "Recut: American Stories, Part 2"; "Recut: Out of This World, Part 1"; "Recut: Out of This World, Part 2"; "Recut: Women's Work, Part 1"; "Recut: Women's Work, Part 2"; "Recut: Treasure Fever, Part 1"; "Recut: Treasure Fever, Part 2"
Notes: The 2020 tour would have provided footage for new episodes in 2021, but it was cancelled because of the COVID-19 pandemic. During 2020, Antiques Roadshow appraisers instead visited celebrities – actor Gbenga Akinnagbe, performer Rubén Blades, author Marc Brown, comedian Ronny Chieng, musician and composer Paquito D'Rivera, musician Brenda Feliciano, chef Carla Hall, humorist John Hodgman, Olympic figure skater Nancy Kerrigan, television personality Carson Kressley, comedian Jay Leno, performer Luba Mason, actress S. Epatha Merkerson, broadcast journalist Soledad O'Brien, golfer Dottie Pepper, author Jason Reynolds, humorist Mo Rocca, fashion designer Christian Siriano, and cartoonist Mo Willems – to discuss and appraise their antiques. This footage aired in four new episodes in 2021: "Celebrity Edition, Hour 1", "Celebrity Edition, Hour 2", "Celebrity Edition, Hour 3", and "Celebrity Edition, Hour 4". Otherwise, the show relied on specials made up of previously aired appraisals and "Vintage" episodes to fill out the season. With no tour stop footage to use for it, no "Junk in the Trunk" episode aired this season.
26	Coral Peña	2021	2022
Locations: Omni Mount Washington Resort, Bretton Woods, New Hampshire; Grounds for Sculpture, Hamilton, New Jersey; Samuel Wadsworth Russell House, Middletown, Connecticut; Hempstead House, Sands Point, New York; Colonial Williamsburg, Williamsburg, Virginia
Specials: "Junk in the Trunk 11"; "Let's Celebrate!"; "Musical Scores"; "Natural Wonders"
Vintage Episodes: "Vintage Grand Rapids, Hour 1"; "Vintage Grand Rapids, Hour 2"; "Vintage Palm Springs, Hour 1"; "Vintage Palm Springs, Hour 2"; "Vintage San Antonio, Hour 1"; "Vintage San Antonio, Hour 2"
Antiques Roadshow Recut, Season 3: "Recut: Bonanzaville, Part 1"; "Recut: Bonanzaville, Part 2"; "Recut: Winterthur Museum, Garden & Library Part 1"; "Recut: Winterthur Museum, Garden & Library, Part 2"; "Recut: Crocker Art Museum, Part 1"; "Recut: Crocker Art Museum, Part 2"; "Recut: Desert Botanical Garden, Hour 1"; "Recut: Desert Botanical Garden, Hour 2"
Notes: Rather than conventional tour stops, guests at each stop were filmed by invitation only on a closed set to ensure safety during the COVID-19 pandemic.
27	Coral Peña	2022	2023
Locations: Cheekwood Botanical Garden and Museum of Art, Nashville, Tennessee; Idaho Botanical Garden, Boise, Idaho; Museum Hill, Santa Fe, New Mexico; Filoli, Woodside, California; Shelburne Museum, Shelburne, Vermont
Specials: "Did Grandma Lie?"; "Junk in the Trunk 12"; "Thrills & Chills"; "Wags to Riches"
Vintage Episodes: "Vintage Chattanooga, Hour 1"; "Vintage Chattanooga, Hour 2"; "Vintage Dallas, Hour 1"; "Vintage Dallas, Hour 2"; "Vintage Hartford, 2023, Hour 1"; "Vintage Hartford, 2023, Hour 2"
Notes: No episodes of Antiques Roadshow Recut aired.
28	Coral Peña	2023	2024
Locations: LSU Rural Life Museum, Baton Rouge, Louisiana; North Carolina Museum of Art, Raleigh, North Carolina; Stan Hywet Hall and Gardens, Akron, Ohio; Old Sturbridge Village, Sturbridge, Massachusetts; Alaska Native Heritage Center, Anchorage, Alaska
Specials: "Celebrating Native American Heritage"; "Extraordinary Finds 3"; "I Was There"; "Junk in the Trunk 13"
Vintage Episodes: "Vintage Atlantic City, Hour 1"; "Vintage Atlantic City, Hour 2"; "Vintage Denver, Hour 1"; "Vintage Denver, Hour 2"; "Vintage Madison, Hour 1"; "Vintage Madison, Hour 2"
Antiques Roadshow Recut, Season 4: "Recut: Filoli, Part 1"; "Recut: Filoli, Part 2"; "Recut: Filoli, Part 3"; "Recut: Filoli, Part 4"; "Recut: Idaho Botanical Garden, Part 1"; "Recut: Idaho Botanical Garden, Part 2"; "Recut: Idaho Botanical Garden, Part 3"; "Recut: Idaho Botanical Garden, Part 4"
29	Coral Peña	2024	2025
Locations: Crystal Bridges Museum of American Art, Bentonville, Arkansas; Denver Botanic Farms at Chatfield Farm, Littleton, Colorado; Living History Farms, Urbandale, Iowa; The Maryland Zoo in Baltimore, Baltimore, Maryland; Springs Preserve, Las Vegas, Nevada
Specials: "Junk in the Trunk 14"; "Kids Stuff"; "Never Seen That Before!"; "Pretty or Pretty Ugly"
Vintage Episodes: "Vintage Phoenix, Hour 1"; "Vintage Phoenix, Hour 2"; "Vintage Raleigh 2025, Hour 1"; "Vintage Raleigh 2025, Hour 2"; "Vintage San Jose, Hour 1"; "Vintage San Jose, Hour 2"
30	Coral Peña	2025	2026
Locations: Castle Farms, Charlevoix, Michigan; Coastal Maine Botanical Gardens, Boothbay, Maine; Georgia State Railroad Museum, Savannah, Georgia; Grant's Farm, St. Louis, Missouri; Red Butte Garden and Arboretum, Salt Lake City, Utah
Specials: "250 Years of Americana"; "Junk in the Trunk 15"
31	Coral Peña	2026	2027
Locations: Old Tucson Studios, Tucson, Arizona; Indianapolis Museum of Art, Indianapolis; Genesee Country Village and Museum, Mumford, New York
Specials: "Junk in the Trunk 16"; "Movie Anniversaries"

== Filming locations ==
Forty-nine U.S. states except Wyoming, the District of Columbia, and one Canadian province have hosted Antiques Roadshow tour stops. In 2020, Antiques Roadshow made no tour stops because of the COVID-19 pandemic; the four Celebrity Edition episodes filmed in 2020 and aired in 2021 during Season 25 did not consist of tour stops, and are not included below.

The broadcast years of tour stops follow. The tapings for each stop on a season's itinerary took place the previous year with the exception of the 2002 Massachusetts episodes, which were taped two years earlier.

State/Province	Broadcast Season (Tapings are one year prior to given year)
Alabama	3 (2000, 2007, 2015)
Alaska	1 (2024)
Arizona	6 (1998, 2002, 2007, 2010, 2016, 2020)
Arkansas	3 (2003, 2016, 2025)
California	15 (1998, 1999, 2001, 2002, 2004, 2006, 2009, 2010, 2011, 2014, 2015, 2017, 2019, 2020, 2023)
Colorado	4 (1997, 2001, 2010, 2025)
Connecticut	4 (1997, 1999, 2009, 2022)
Delaware	1 (2020)
District of Columbia	1 (2011)
Florida	8 (2000, 2002, 2006, 2008, 2011, 2014, 2017, 2019)
Georgia	4 (1998, 2004, 2012, 2026)
Hawaii	1 (2007)
Idaho	2 (2014, 2023)
Illinois	3 (1997, 2004, 2015)
Indiana	2 (2002, 2017)
Iowa	3 (2000, 2011, 2025)
Kansas	1 (2009)
Kentucky	3 (1999, 2008, 2019)
Louisiana	4 (2002, 2014, 2018, 2024)
Maine	1 (2026)
Maryland	4 (1997, 2000, 2008, 2025)
Massachusetts	4 (1997, 2002, 2013, 2024)
Michigan	5 (1997, 2009, 2014, 2018, 2026)
Minnesota	4 (1997, 2005, 2012, 2019)
Mississippi	1 (2011)
Missouri	6 (1997, 2001, 2003, 2014, 2018, 2026)
Montana	1 (2011)
Nebraska	2 (2005, 2016)
Nevada	4 (2001, 2005, 2008, 2025)
New Hampshire	1 (2022)
New Jersey	3 (1998, 2010, 2022)
New Mexico	4 (1997, 2003, 2015, 2023)
New York	4 (1999, 2002, 2015, 2022)
North Carolina	4 (1997, 2003, 2010, 2024)
North Dakota	3 (2006, 2015, 2020)
Ohio	6 (1998, 2000, 2003, 2013, 2016, 2024)
Oklahoma	4 (2001, 2004, 2012, 2019)
Oregon	4 (1999, 2005, 2012, 2018)
Pennsylvania	5 (1997, 1998, 2007, 2012, 2018)
Rhode Island	3 (2000, 2006, 2018)
South Carolina	3 (2001, 2013, 2016)
South Dakota	1 (2013)
Tennessee	5 (1998, 2005, 2009, 2014, 2023)
Texas	11 (1997, 1998, 1999, 2001, 2006, 2008, 2009, 2012, 2013, 2017, 2020)
Utah	4 (2000, 2007, 2017, 2026)
Vermont	1 (2023)
Virginia	4 (1999, 2014, 2017, 2022)
Washington	4 (1997, 2003, 2008, 2013)
West Virginia	1 (2015)
Wisconsin	5 (1999, 2001, 2007, 2010, 2018)
Wyoming	0
Ontario (Canada)	1 (2000)

== Accolades ==
Year	Award	Category	Nominee(s)	Result	Ref.
2002	Primetime Emmy Awards	Outstanding Nonfiction Series (Informational)	Marsha Bemko and Peter B. Cook	Nominated	
2003	Primetime Emmy Awards	Outstanding Nonfiction Program (Alternative)	Marsha Bemko and Peter B. Cook	Nominated	
2005	Primetime Emmy Awards	Outstanding Reality Program	Marsha Bemko, Robert Marshall and Mark L. Walberg	Nominated	
2006	Primetime Emmy Awards	Outstanding Reality Program	Marsha Bemko and Mark L. Walberg	Nominated	
2007	Primetime Creative Arts Emmy Awards	Outstanding Reality Program	Marsha Bemko, Sam Farrell and Mark L. Walberg	Nominated	
2008	Primetime Emmy Awards	Outstanding Reality Program	Marsha Bemko and Sam Farrell	Nominated	
2009	Primetime Emmy Awards	Outstanding Reality Program	Marsha Bemko and Sam Farrell	Nominated	
2010	Primetime Creative Arts Emmy Awards	Outstanding Reality Program	Marsha Bemko and Sam Farrell	Nominated	
2011	Primetime Creative Arts Emmy Awards	Outstanding Reality Program	Marsha Bemko and Sam Farrell	Nominated	
2012	Primetime Creative Arts Emmy Awards	Outstanding Reality Program	Marsha Bemko and Sam Farrell	Nominated	
2013	Primetime Creative Arts Emmy Awards	Outstanding Reality Program	Marsha Bemko and Sam Farrell	Nominated	
2014	Primetime Creative Arts Emmy Awards	Outstanding Structured Reality Program	Marsha Bemko, Sam Farrell and Sarah K. Elliott	Nominated	
2015	Primetime Creative Arts Emmy Awards	Outstanding Structured Reality Program	Marsha Bemko, Sam Farrell and Sarah K. Elliott	Nominated	
2016	Primetime Creative Arts Emmy Awards	Outstanding Structured Reality Program	Marsha Bemko, Sam Farrell and Sarah K. Elliott	Nominated	
2016	Critics' Choice Television Awards	Best Structured Reality Show	Antiques Roadshow	Nominated	
2017	Primetime Creative Arts Emmy Awards	Outstanding Structured Reality Program	Marsha Bemko, Sam Farrell and Sarah K. Elliott	Nominated	
2018	Primetime Creative Arts Emmy Awards	Outstanding Structured Reality Program	Marsha Bemko, Sam Farrell and Sarah K. Elliott	Nominated	
2019	Primetime Creative Arts Emmy Awards	Outstanding Structured Reality Program	Marsha Bemko, Sam Farrell and Sarah K. Elliott	Nominated	
2020	Primetime Creative Arts Emmy Awards	Outstanding Structured Reality Program	Marsha Bemko, Sam Farrell and Sarah K. Elliott	Nominated	
2021	Primetime Creative Arts Emmy Awards	Outstanding Structured Reality Program	Marsha Bemko, Adam Monahan, Sam Farrell and Sarah K. Elliott	Nominated	
2022	Primetime Creative Arts Emmy Awards	Outstanding Structured Reality Program	Marsha Bemko, Sam Farrell and Sarah K. Elliott	Nominated	
2023	Primetime Creative Arts Emmy Awards	Outstanding Structured Reality Program	Marsha Bemko, Sam Farrell and Sarah K. Elliott	Nominated	
2024	Primetime Creative Arts Emmy Awards	Outstanding Structured Reality Program	Marsha Bemko, Sam Farrell and Sarah K. Elliott	Nominated	
2025	Primetime Creative Arts Emmy Awards	Outstanding Structured Reality Program	Marsha Bemko, Sam Farrell and Sarah K. Elliott	Nominated	
2026	Primetime Creative Arts Emmy Awards	Outstanding Structured Reality Program	Marsha Bemko, Sam Farrell, Sarah K. Elliott and Jill Giles	Won	

== See also ==
- It's Worth What?
- Buried Treasure
- Market Warriors
