= Coral Peña =

Dominican actor

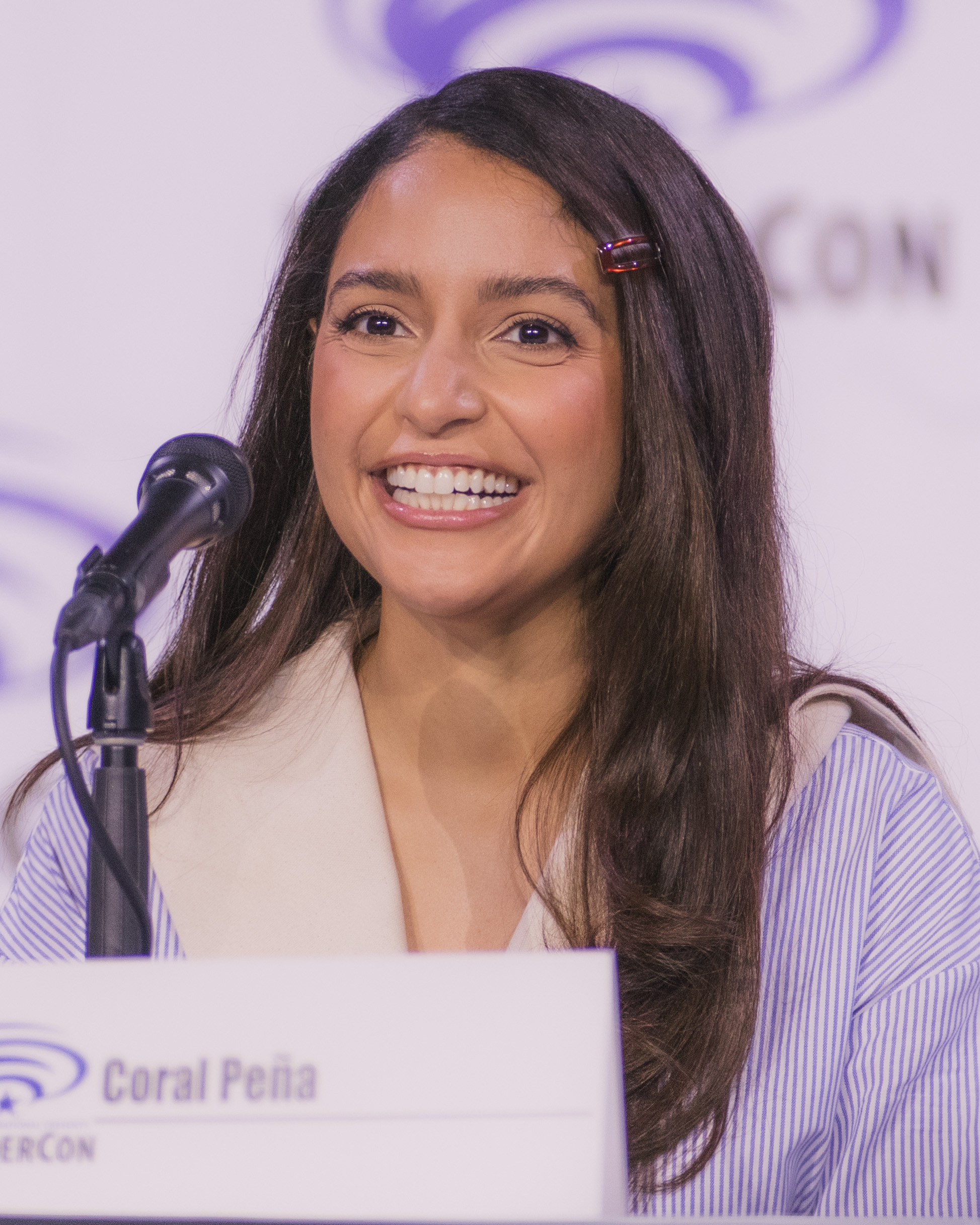
- Peña in 2026
- Born: 1992/1993 (age 33–34); Santo Domingo, Dominican Republic
- Education: New York University
- Occupation: Actor
- Years active: 2015–present

Coral Peña (born 1992/1993) is a Dominican-American actor. She is best known for playing the role of Aleida Rosales on the Apple TV series For All Mankind.

== Early life and education ==
Peña was born in Santo Domingo, Dominican Republic and raised by a single mother in housing projects in Harlem, New York City.

Peña graduated from St. Hilda's & St. Hugh's School in New York and the Peddie School in New Jersey. She then studied drama at New York University's Tisch School of the Arts, with conservatory training at the Stella Adler Studio of Acting and the Royal Academy of Dramatic Art.

== Career ==
Peña made her debut film appearance in The Post, directed by Steven Spielberg.

Peña was cast opposite Corey Hawkins, Miranda Otto, and Jimmy Smits in the reboot of 24 titled 24: Legacy in 2016. In 2019, she joined the main cast of For All Mankind in its second season, playing the role of Aleida Rosales. Critics lauded Peña's performance in the show's fourth season, writing "Coral Peña steals the show," as well as calling her the season’s "standout."

Peña's stage performances include the role of Ry in the off-Broadway premiere of BLKS at the MCC Theater; Kit in Our Dear Dead Drug Lord at the Kirk Douglas Theatre; and Ophelia in Robert O'Hara's production of Hamlet, starring Patrick Ball as Hamlet and Gina Torres as Gertrude, at the Mark Taper Forum. The Los Angeles Times praised Peña's performance in Hamlet, noting her "formidable Ophelia might be the production's saving grace. Fiercely independent, she answers to no one's morality but her own."

In 2023, Peña was nominated for the Imagen Award for Best Supporting Actress for her work on For All Mankind.

She currently narrates the American version of Antiques Roadshow.

== Personal life ==
Peña identifies as nonbinary. She has lived in New York City for nearly all of her life.

== Filmography ==
=== Film ===
| Year | Title | Role | Notes |
|---|---|---|---|
| 2015 | Drooler | Mia | Short film |
| 2016 | Carrie Pilby | Hostess | |
| 2017 | The Pirates of Somalia | Katlyn | |
| 2017 | The Post | Nancy | |
| 2019 | The Wisdom Tooth | Lydia | |
| 2020 | Chemical Hearts | Cora Hernandez | |
| 2023 | Story Ave | Gloria Sanchez | |
| 2024 | Thelma | Allie | |
| 2025 | Swiped | Marta | |

=== Television ===
| Year | Title | Role | Notes |
|---|---|---|---|
| 2015 | Blue Bloods | Olivia Francisco | Episode: "Hold Outs" |
| 2016 | The Fantastic Adventures of Foolish Gentlemen | Birthday Girl | Episode: "Issue 2: Confusion" |
| 2016–2017 | 24: Legacy | Mariana Stiles | Main cast |
| 2018 | The Resident | Louisa Rodriguez | Episode: "Comrades in Arms" |
| 2018 | Blindspot | Alexis Parkin | Episode: "Clamorous Night" |
| 2019 | The Enemy Within | Anna Cruz | Recurring role |
| 2020–present | Antiques Roadshow | Narrator | Voice (Season 24–present) |
| 2021–present | For All Mankind | Aleida Rosales | Main cast (season 2–present) |
| 2025 | Task | Meg Coyle | Miniseries |
