= Idaho Botanical Garden =

American botanical garden

Coordinates: 43.6012°N 116.1612°W

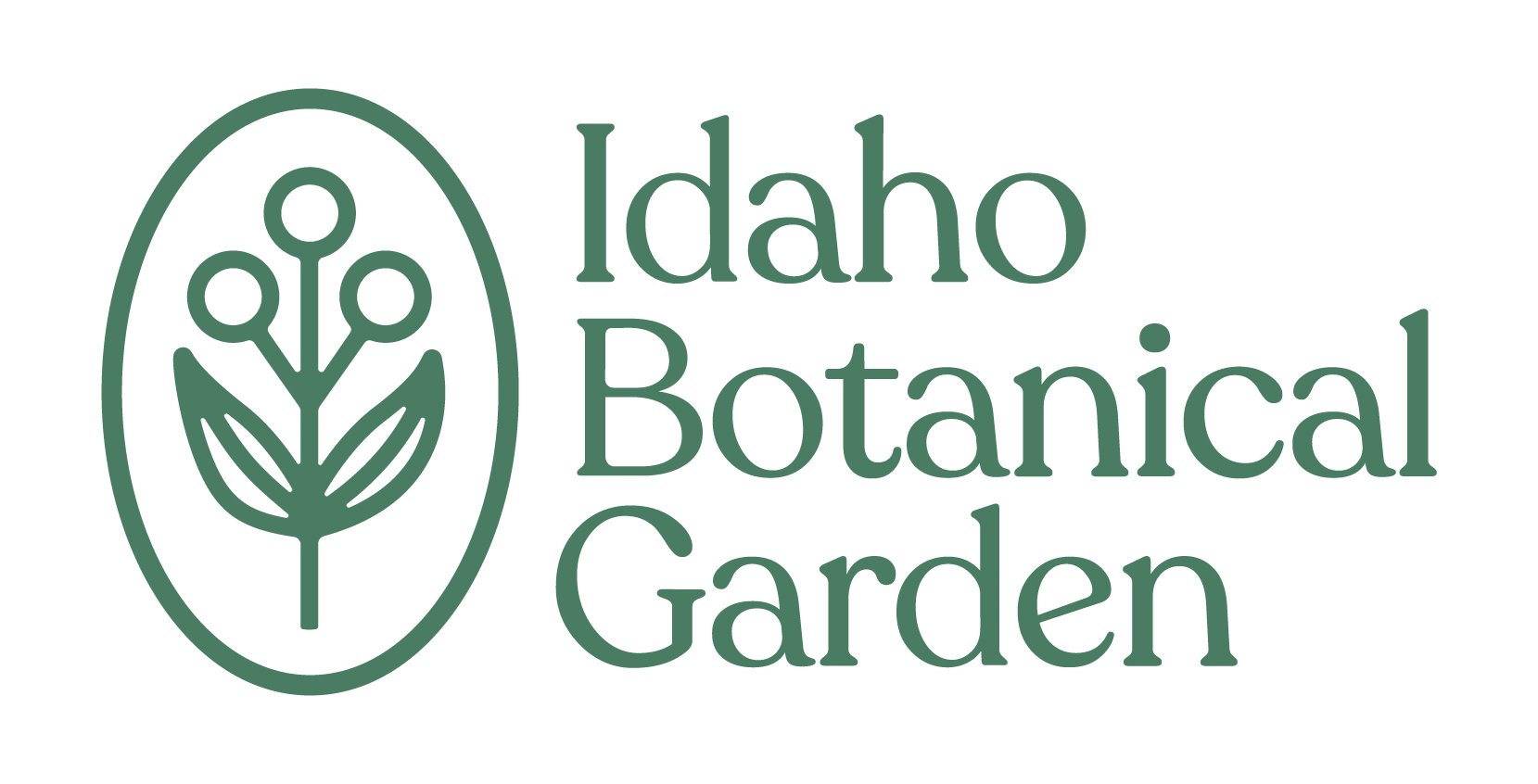

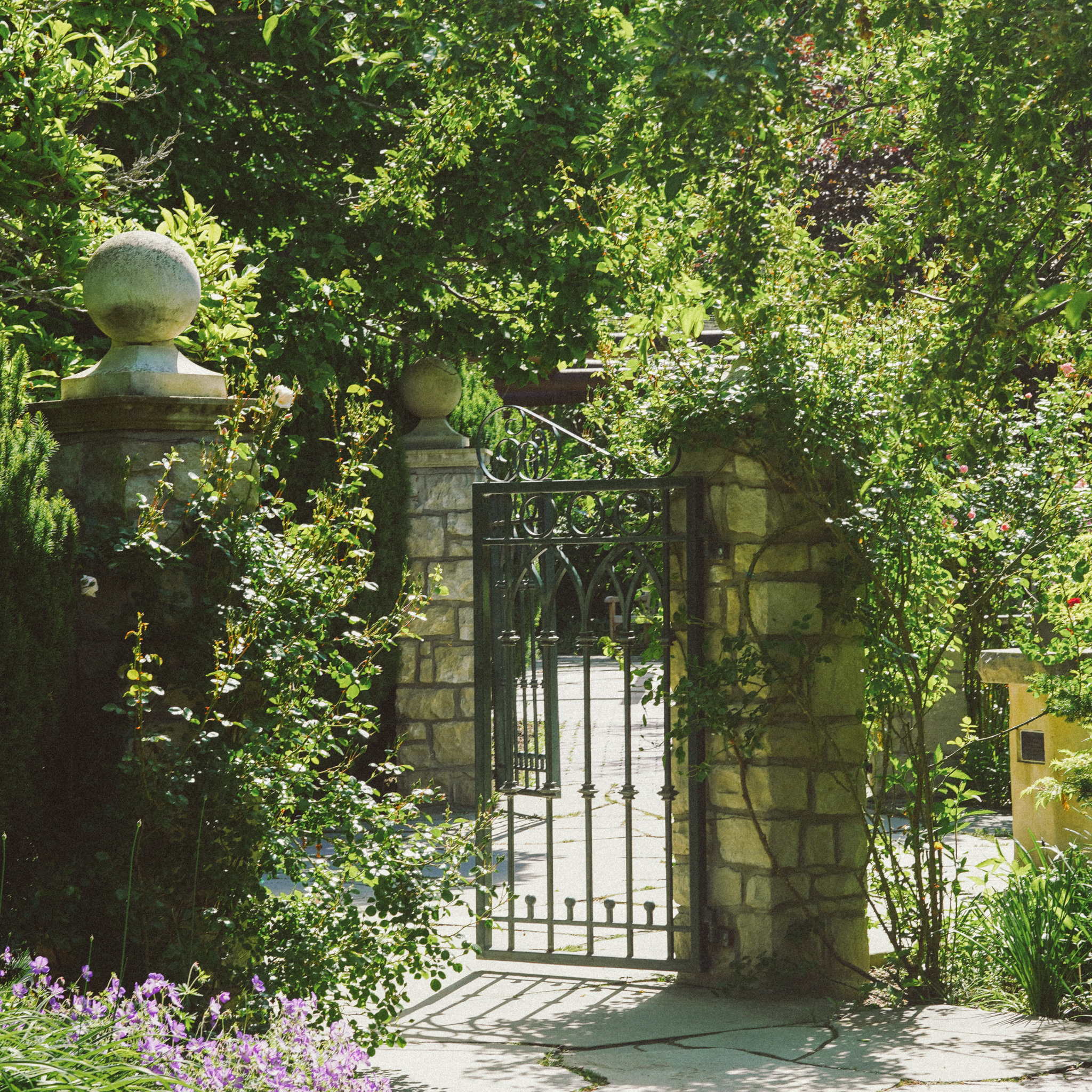
- A path through the English Garden
- Type: Non-profit organization 501(c)(3)
- Founded: 1984
- Headquarters: Boise, Idaho in Ada County, United States
- Services: Tours, education, events
- Revenue: 1,554,023 United States dollar (2020)
- Total assets: 3,764,156 United States dollar (2022)
- Number of employees: 30+
- Website: Official website

The Idaho Botanical Garden, located in the historic Old Penitentiary District of Boise, Idaho, is a 501(c)(3) nonprofit organization dedicated to connecting people, plants, and nature. The Garden serves as a gathering space in the Boise community and advocates environmental stewardship. Spanning 15 acres, the Idaho Botanical Garden is a premier collection of plants cultivated for the unique sagebrush steppe ecosystem of the Treasure Valley aimed at showcasing the region's biodiversity.

As a 501(c)(3) nonprofit, the Idaho Botanical Garden does not receive government funding but instead relies on donations, grants, admission fees, special event fundraisers, and a membership program to remain operational. Community partnerships and collaborations through jointly hosted events and sponsorships are other key elements for functionality.

Until 1973 the site served as the Old Idaho State Penitentiary's farm and nursery. After the penitentiary was closed, the land lay dormant for more than a decade, and in 1984 the gardens were first created. The Garden was established on a leased 42-acre site within the historic grounds of the Old Idaho Penitentiary. Local botanist Dr. Christopher Davidson and a select board of directors began crafting the Garden's infrastructure, including installing an irrigation system to sustain the botanical collection.

The Children's Adventure Garden was created, and designed as an educational environment with interactive and play elements. Over the years, the Garden expanded the ecosystem of plants, instituted environmental education opportunities, and hosted a range of programs and events for the community.

== Gardens ==
=== English Garden ===
The Idaho Botanical Garden features an English Garden, designed by English landscape architect John Brookes and made possible by Muriel and Diana Kirk. Opened in 1998, this garden showcases large groupings of perennials that provide year-round seasonal interest. With more than 1,300 perennials, the garden utilizes the wall of the Old Idaho State Penitentiary as a backdrop.

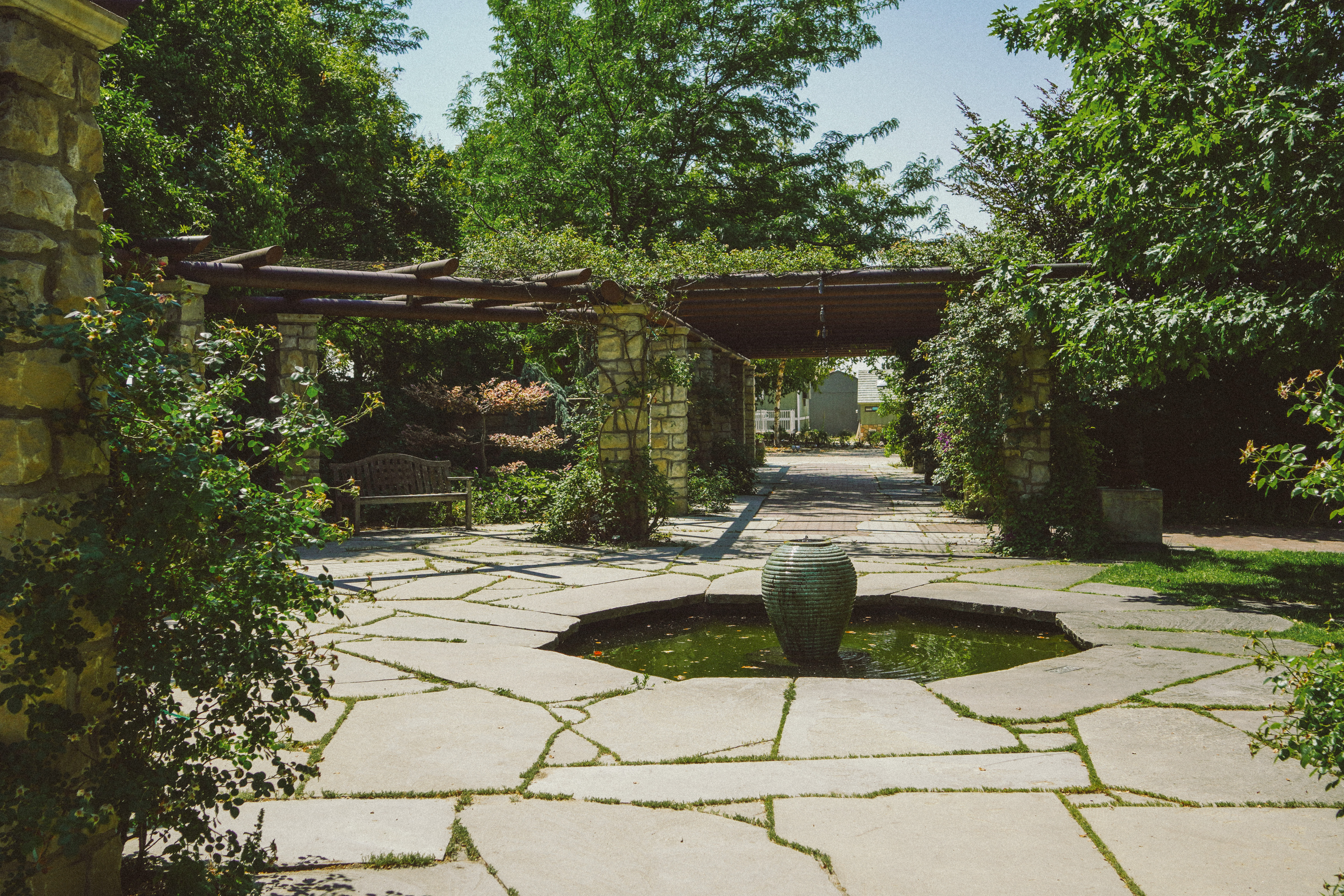
View of the English Garden Fountain

A key focal point of the Muriel and Diana Kirk English Garden is the charming Summer House, constructed of Tablerock sandstone. The black slate roof originally graced the Veterans Home, and the ceiling is wood from the floor of Boise’s former J.C. Penneys store. The crowning achievement is the wrought iron and copper weathervane, crafted by Boise’s own master blacksmith Nahum Hersom. Another focal point is the Princess Diana Fountain, dedicated in 1998 in memory of Diana, Princess of Wales.

=== Herb Garden ===
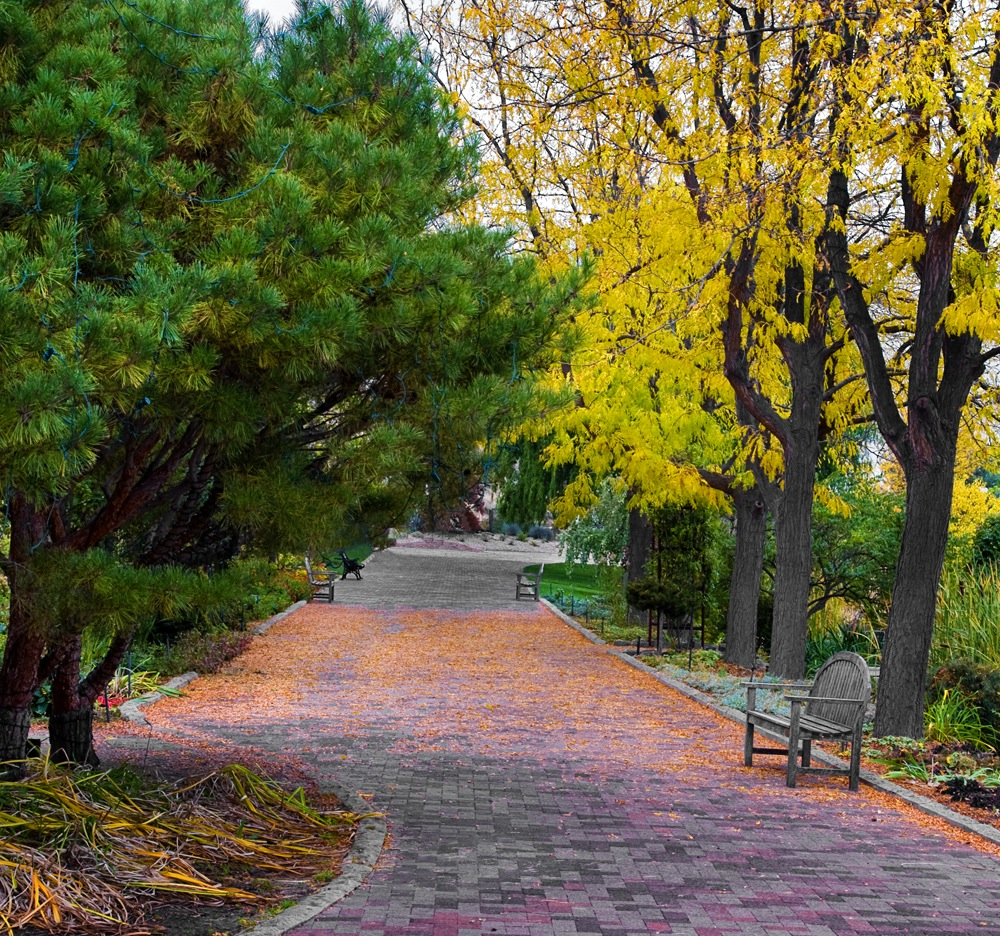

Established in the early 1990s, this garden showcases a variety of herbs that have been used for centuries in medicines, cosmetics, decorations, and cooking. Visitors can explore various species and varieties of thyme, oregano, comfrey, marjoram, rosemary, chives, and other common as well as lesser-known herbs, such as costmary, bugloss, sorrel, rue, and celandine.

The Herb Garden features stonework salvaged from Boise's Eastman Building, which was destroyed in the 1987 downtown fire. A brick pathway circles the garden, while a stone pathway allows visitors to walk through the center of the bed for a closer look. The stonework came from Boise’s Eastman Building which burned down in the 1986 downtown fire.

=== Idaho Native Plant Garden (completed 1994) ===
Representative plants from Idaho's desert and woodland environments, including sagebrush, syringa, native dogwood, and Idaho fescue.

=== Meditation Garden ===
The Meditation Garden is located to the east of the brick road and north of the old Children's Garden. This space has flowing water and a pond. The shade cover present in the Garden provides a cool respite with the shaded areas adjusting temperatures in the space by up to 20 degrees cooler than open areas in the afternoon sun. The Meditation Garden features a collection of broadleaf evergreens, conifers, and deciduous plants that thrive in shade, cool and moist air. The trees in the Meditation Garden area were originally planted in the 1960s by minimum-security inmates from the Old State Penitentiary when it was part of the prison’s plant nursery. On the Garden’s opening day, JR Simplot planted a Red Oak that still stands to this day. The sandstone quarried on Table Rock by the prisoners constructs the back wall of the Garden Woods. The space provides picnic tables for visitors as well.

=== Rose Garden ===
The Rose Garden space was made possible by Jane Falk Oppenheimer. This garden offers a collection of antique and newer roses, along with a variety of popular perennials planted to extend the seasonal interest of the garden. Named after Jane Falk Oppenheimer, who generously contributed to its creation, the Rose Garden showcases roses bred and introduced before 1920, as well as more modern varieties. The design of the Rose Garden features picturesque surroundings, reflecting the contours of the Boise foothills through sandstone terraces and rustic stone walls of the Old Penitentiary. It has been a notably beloved garden at the Idaho Botanical Garden since its opening in 1989.

=== Children’s Adventure Garden ===
The Idaho Botanical Garden's Children's Adventure Garden is a space created for kids' outdoor exploration. The space contains play structures fashioned from large hollow logs and other nature items. There is a carnivorous plant display, a treehouse area overlooking the koi pond and Meditation Garden, a large pencil-shaped bench, a permanent and interactive willow tunnel, a "Boys on the Swing" fountain, a sensory garden, and a musical trail. The Children's Adventure Garden also hosts educational programs such as on-site facilitated field trips and summer STEAM camp programming. The adventure garden also includes a Kitchen Garden, allowing children to tend to the vegetables, fruits, herbs, and edible flowers, along with a Kitchen Play-House. Other garden spaces include features on Idaho geology or instruments along the musical trail.

=== Plant Select Demonstration Garden ===
Since 2012, IBG has showcased some of these plants in the Plant Select® Demonstration Garden. They became a licensed propagator in 2018, which allows them to grow plants for use in the garden and to offer them for sale to the public. Plants were chosen for the program to exhibit these eight attributes: Flourishes with less water, thrives in a broad range of conditions, is habitat-friendly, demonstrates resilience in challenging climates, is considered one of a kind/unique, resists disease & insects, has long-lasting beauty, and is non-invasive. The partnership with Plant Select also allows the Idaho Botanical Garden to propagate and include these plants in their annual plant sale, further promoting the use of regionally suitable plants. This garden is no longer accessible to the public.

=== Vegetable Garden ===
Located near the Summer Succulent Garden and Pencil Bench, the Idaho Botanical Garden's Vegetable Garden is a seasonal garden featuring not only summer vegetables but also a colorful array of annual flowers and a pumpkin patch. The garden serves as an educational space for children and adults to learn about raised beds, seeds, and flower and vegetable gardening. It is extensively used for educational programs and offers a hands-on experience for visitors.

=== Idaho Native Plant Garden ===
In partnership with the Pahove Chapter of the Idaho Native Plant Society, the Idaho Botanical Garden established the Idaho Native Plant Garden in 1990. This garden aims to showcase a selection of Idaho's diverse flora, educate visitors about the region's botanical heritage, and emphasize the importance of native plants. The garden features a growing list of native grasses, forbs, trees, and shrubs that thrive in the high desert climate. A small pond and waterfall exhibit a variety of native wetland plants, while a petrified log from the Owyhee Mountain Range showcases the deep biological history of the region.

=== Lewis and Clark Native Plant Garden ===
Opened in May 2006, the Lewis and Clark Native Plant Garden commemorates the bicentennial of the Lewis & Clark Expedition (1804-1806). This garden displays a selection of plants collected during the expedition, focusing on the 145 species collected between Great Falls, Montana, and The Dalles, Oregon. Organized into four zones - Canyon, Prairie, Mountain, and Wetland - the garden features plants and other features characteristic of their respective ecological communities. The Gathering Place, located at the garden entrance, showcases a green roof planted with native forbs and grasses and draws inspiration from Thomas Jefferson's Monticello and Indigenous Peoples' kivas. Interpretive signs inform visitors about the significance of the expedition and the contributions of Indigenous Peoples to its success, as well as highlight the ethnobotanical uses of the plants.

=== The Western Waterwise Garden ===
Situated within the boundaries of the Lewis and Clark Native Plant Garden, the Western Waterwise Garden demonstrates drought-tolerant plants native to the western states. This garden aims to inspire visitors to incorporate water-wise plants into their own home gardens. It showcases cultivars of some plants collected during the Lewis and Clark Expedition, highlighting their adaptability to arid conditions.

=== The Firewise Garden ===
Adjacent to the northern border of the Lewis and Clark Native Plant Garden, the Firewise Garden (https://idahofirewise.org/ ) is a partnership between the Bureau of Land Management, College of Western Idaho's Horticulture Program, and the Idaho Botanical Garden. This garden serves as a demonstration of fire-resistant plants and planting designs that can help protect properties from wildfire damage. With over 300 plant species on display, the garden showcases the use of fire-resistant plants and techniques for wildfire mitigation. Managed and maintained by Idaho Firewise with assistance from students in the horticulture program at the College of Western Idaho, the Firewise Garden can be accessed through the Meditation Garden or the Wetlands of the Lewis and Clark Native Plant Garden.

=== Water Conservation Landscape ===
Located along Old Penitentiary Road, the Water Conservation Landscape is a one-acre garden that welcomes visitors as they approach the entrance to the parking area. This garden was established in 2006, featuring an array of plants that conserve water while enhancing the entrance to the Idaho Botanical Garden. The Water Conservation Landscape serves as an educational tool for drought-tolerant landscaping, demonstrating the use of water-efficient plants that are well-suited to the region's climate. The garden showcases plants that not only conserve water but also offer aesthetic appeal.

=== Art in the Garden ===
The grounds of the Idaho Botanical Garden are not only home to diverse plant collections but also serve as an outdoor gallery of art. The various artworks are dispersed throughout the garden spaces. Permanent land art in the Garden includes the labyrinth, a willow tunnel of Purple Willow (Salix purpurea) and bamboo stakes, and Reverse-Rebirth by Han Seek Hyun consisting of reclaimed wood, discarded furniture, and regionally adapted plants to create the tree-like sculpture.

== Events and Programs ==
The Idaho Botanical Garden offers various events and programs throughout the year, catering to diverse interests and age groups. The most popular of which are Great Garden Escape, the Harvest Festival, and Winter Garden aGlow. The Garden also offers adult education classes through spring, summer, and fall. Children's programs include Nature Camps, Field Trip Tours, and Education Trunks that are rented out to local schools.

=== Concerts in the Garden ===
The Garden hosts the Great Garden Escape summer concert series annually and features a variety of musical genres. The series takes place in the Meditation Garden and usual attendees will often bring snacks, picnic blankets, or low back chairs into the space to gather.

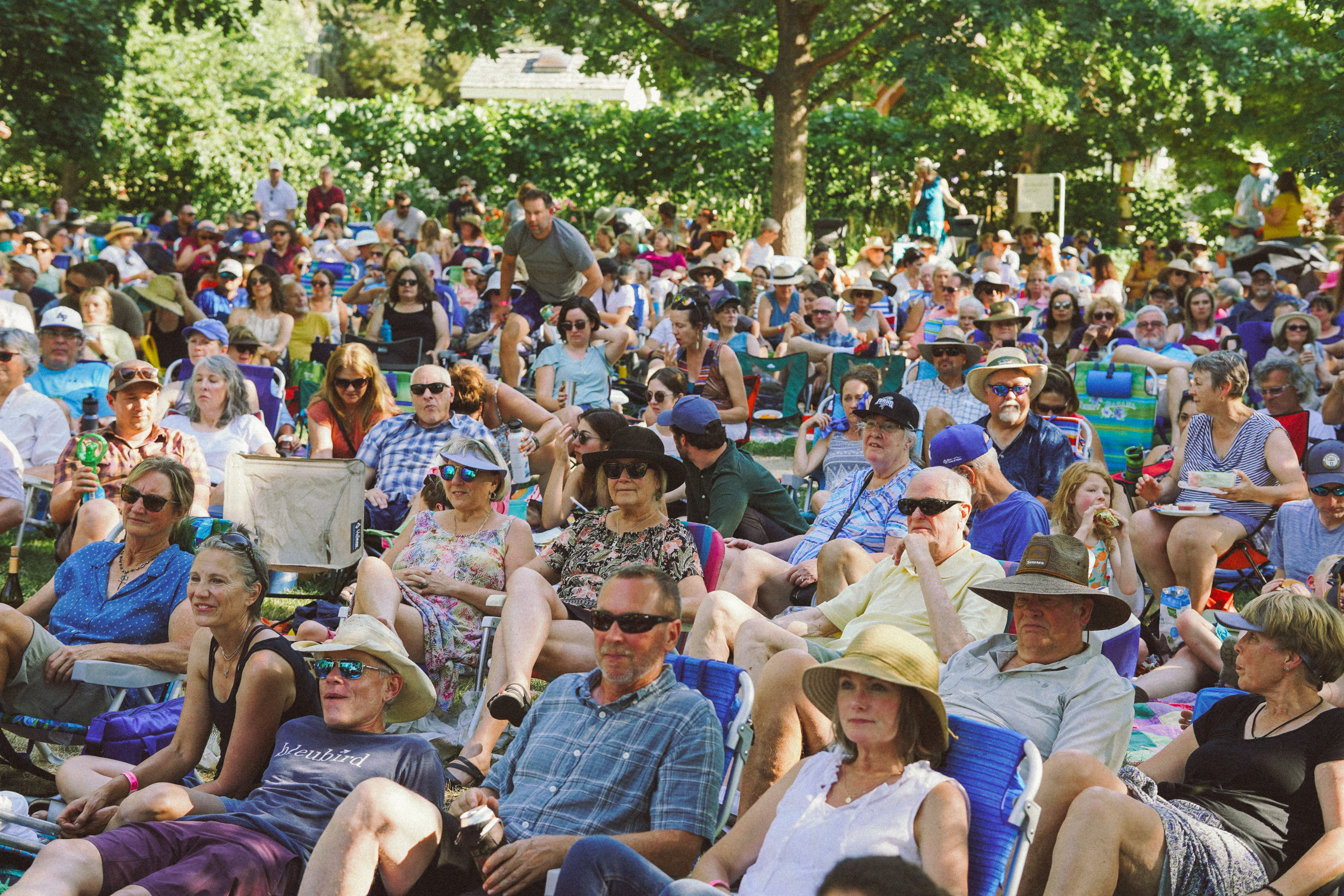

Outlaw Field is a premier Boise outdoor concert venue with a seating capacity of 4,000. Outlaw Field hosts a variety of musical performances throughout the summer months. The venue has hosted numerous renowned artists, such as Ray Charles, Bonnie Raitt, Bob Dylan, and Sheryl Crow.

=== Art exhibitions ===
The Garden serves as an outdoor gallery, showcasing art exhibitions that complement the natural surroundings. Visitors can enjoy a diverse range of artistic creations by local and regional artists. The Garden also hosts several community-driven art exhibitions throughout the year, including Land Art, Fairy House and Gnome Homes, and Scarecrow Stroll.

=== Garden Workshops and Classes ===
The Idaho Botanical Garden offers workshops and classes throughout the year, covering a wide range of topics such as gardening techniques, container gardening, landscape design, topics of local ecology, and sustainable gardening practices.

=== Family-Friendly Events ===
The Garden organizes special events tailored for families and children, such as Bug Day, Scarecrow Stroll, Fall Harvest Days, and Winter Garden aGlow. These events feature interactive activities, education opportunities, storytelling, and entertainment.

=== Nature Walks and Guided Tours ===
Visitors can participate in free guided nature walks and tours led by knowledgeable volunteer guides, allowing them to explore the diverse plant collections, learn about native flora, and discover the natural history of the region.

=== Plant Sales ===
The Idaho Botanical Garden hosts annual plant sales, offering a wide selection of plants, including native species, perennials, annuals, and unique cultivars. These sales allow Garden enthusiasts to expand their own Garden collections while supporting the Garden's mission and raising funds for the horticulture department.

=== Education Programs ===
The Idaho Botanical Garden offers educational programs catered to schools and youth groups, providing hands-on learning experiences, nature exploration, and environmental education. These programs include summer camps and spring and fall field trips all guided by a STEAM framework.

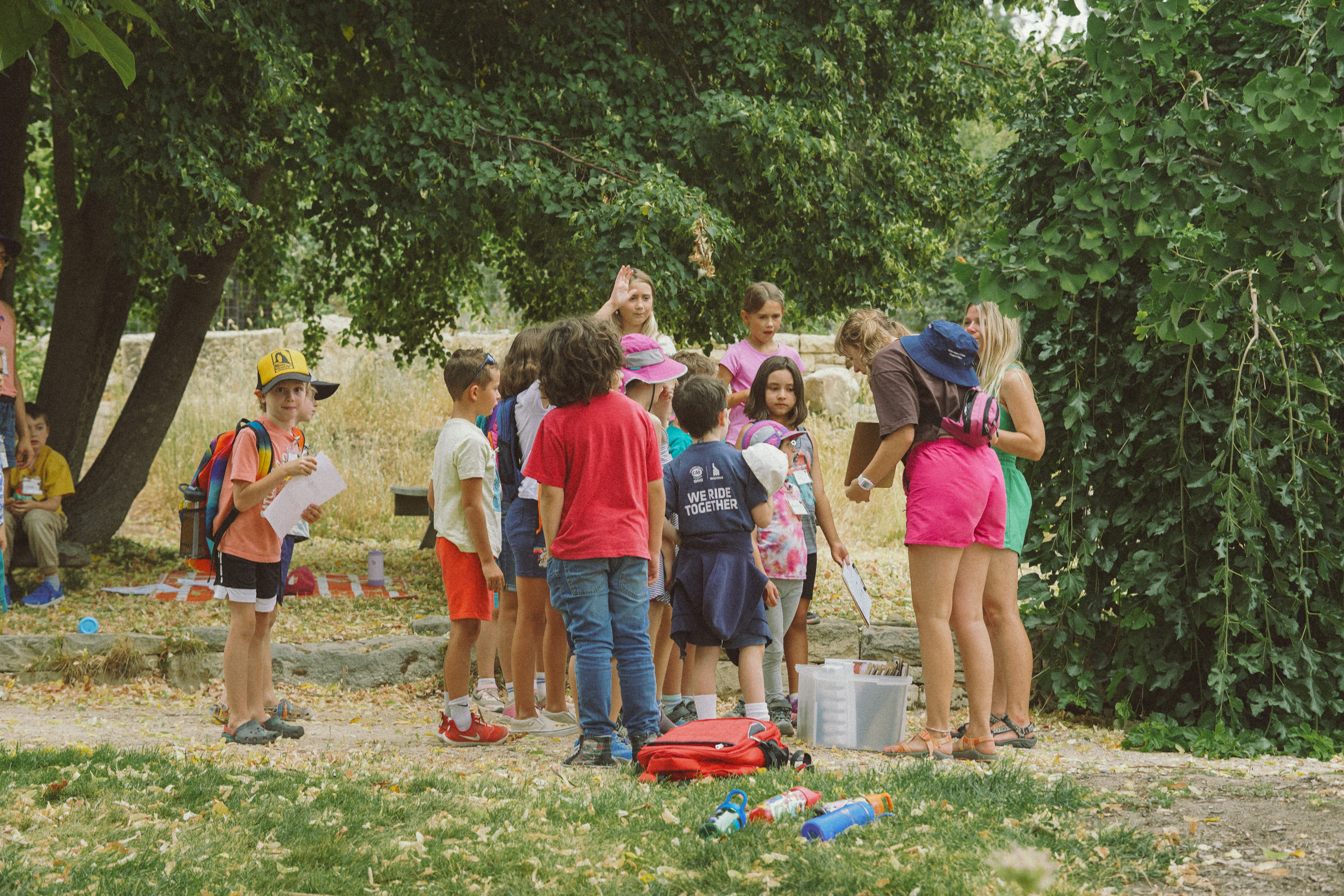

=== Volunteer Programs ===
The Garden actively engages volunteers who are vital in various aspects of Garden operations, events, and educational programs. Volunteers contribute their time, skills, and passion, helping to maintain the Gardens, assist with educational activities, and support the overall mission of the Garden.

=== Community Outreach ===
The Idaho Botanical Garden actively engages in community outreach efforts, participating in local festivals, fairs, and other community events. These outreach activities aim to raise awareness about the importance of plants, nature conservation, and sustainable gardening practices.

== Partnerships ==
=== Boise Farmers Market ===
The Idaho Botanical Garden maintains a close and dynamic collaboration with the Boise Farmers Market, a local organization committed to supporting local farmers, artisans, and small businesses. This partnership exemplifies a shared vision for promoting sustainable agriculture, fostering community connections, and celebrating the abundance of local produce and artisanal products.

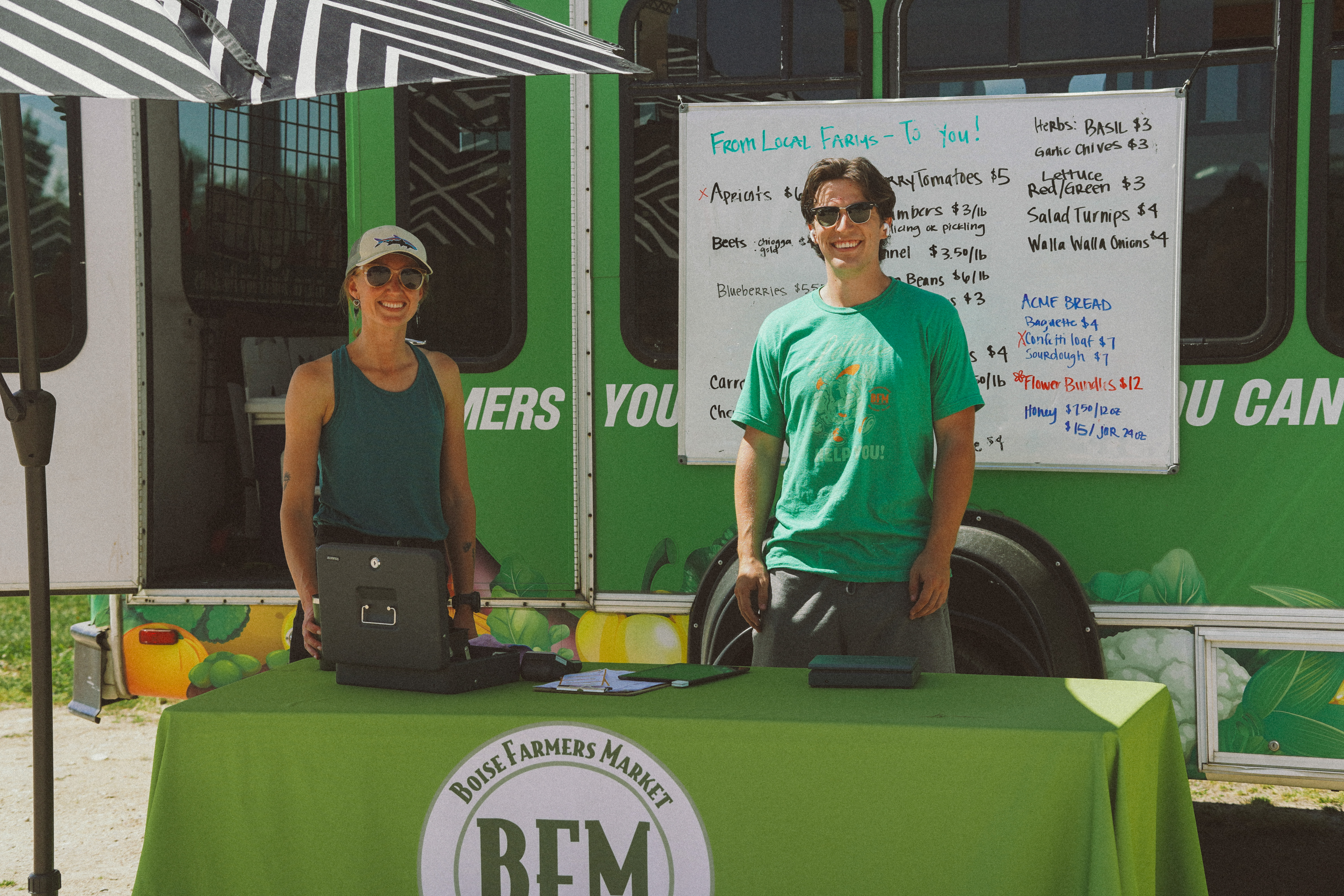

=== City of Good and Boise State Food Pantry ===
The Garden is partnering with City of Good and the Boise State Food Pantry to provide fresh herbs, vegetables, and plants to students this summer. City of Good volunteers come to the garden to harvest and distribute the produce, which is then available for free to any student enrolled in at least one credit at BSU. This partnership aims to raise awareness about food insecurity in the Boise area and provide students with access to fresh, healthy food options.

=== Master Naturalists ===
The Idaho Botanical Garden supports the Idaho Master Naturalist program which aims to develop a corps of well-informed volunteers to work toward the stewardship of Idaho’s natural environment. Any adult who enjoys nature and is interested in learning more can become a certified Master Naturalist by joining the Sagebrush-steppe Chapter. Classes are taught in collaboration with the Idaho Department of Fish and Game, MK Nature Center, and the Golden Eagle Audubon Society.

== See also ==
- List of botanical gardens in the United States
