= Property room =

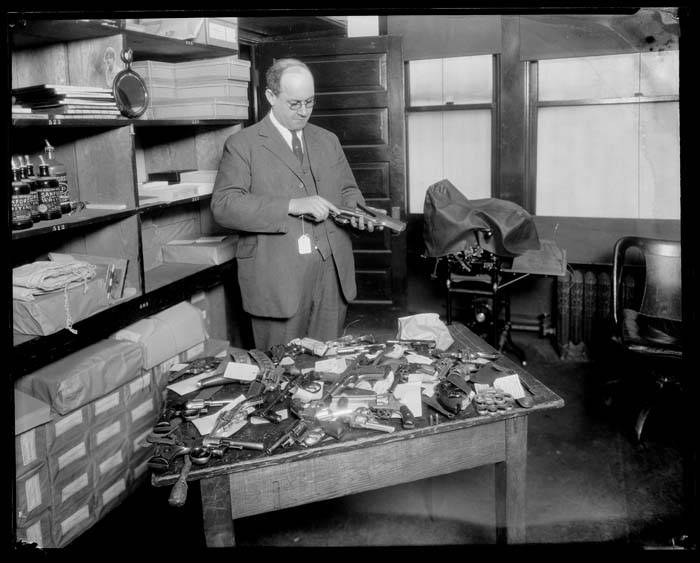
Firearms and other weapons in the Seattle Police Department property room, circa 1922.

Property rooms, or evidence rooms, are secure areas used to store seized property, stolen property, and evidence to be used in court. They are typically located in a police station. Evidence or property in most cases may only be handled by technicians in order to preserve the chain of custody. All evidence taken in or out has to be tagged, logged and barcoded.
