= WBKI =

WBKI may refer to:

- WBKI (TV), a television station (channel 16, virtual 58) licensed to serve Salem, Indiana, United States
- WLUE (AM), a radio station (1600 AM) licensed to serve Eminence, Kentucky, United States, which held the call sign WBKI from January to February 2018
- WMYO-CD, a television station (channel 18, virtual 24) licensed to serve Louisville, Kentucky, which held the call sign WBKI-CD from December 2017 to January 2018
- WBKI-TV (1983–2017), a defunct television station (channel 19, virtual 34) formerly licensed to serve Campbellsville, Kentucky
