= WKLO-TV =

Television station in Louisville, Kentucky (1953–1954)

- Louisville, Kentucky; United States
- Channels: Analog: 21 (UHF)

Programming
- Affiliations: DuMont, ABC

Ownership
- Owner: Mid-America Broadcasting Company
- Sister stations: WKLO

History
- First air date: October 18, 1953
- Last air date: April 20, 1954
- Call sign meaning: Kentucky Louisville

WKLO-TV (channel 21) was a television station in Louisville, Kentucky, United States, that operated from October 18, 1953, to April 20, 1954.

== History ==
Radio station WKLO had applied for a television station construction permit in 1947, shortly before the Federal Communications Commission (FCC) imposed a four-year freeze on the grant of new stations. The application specified channel 13, but when the freeze ended, Louisville wound up with just two VHF assignments, forcing WKLO to seek UHF channel 21 for its station. WKLO's owner, the Mid-America Broadcasting Company, was approved for the permit on November 26, 1952.

After initially proposing a tower in downtown Louisville, WKLO opted to build instead at the Floyds Knobs site in New Albany, Indiana, near a mast then being built by WAVE-TV. Like the radio station, it was aligned with ABC. Some DuMont Television Network programs were also seen.

The first test pattern went out on September 7, 1953, but the first programs were broadcast on October 18.

Channel 21 suffered from the third—and UHF—station in a two-VHF market with insufficient coverage and a poor conversion rate. Because not all televisions could receive UHF signals without converters or a tuning strip—and only some 70,000 to 80,000 sets had been converted out of a total of 330,000—few advertisers were willing to purchase commercial time. As a result, WKLO-TV ceased broadcasting on April 20, 1954. Mid-America Broadcasting retained the construction permit and began years of campaigning to get a third VHF channel moved to Louisville for its use, first appealing for channel 13 to be reassigned from Bowling Green and possibly Indianapolis. In 1956, Mid-America maneuvered to try and relocate channel 7 from Evansville, Indiana, but it was unsuccessful in preventing WTVW from starting up there, despite a favorable FCC ruling in 1958. By this time, the call letters on the permit had changed from WKLO-TV to WEZI.

In 1964, the FCC asked Mid-America to activate WEZI again or risk losing the permit. Mid-America sold the permit to South Central Broadcasting, which owned television station WTVK in Knoxville, Tennessee, as well as radio stations in Evansville, in 1965. With WLKY on the air since 1961 as Kentuckiana's third commercial station, South Central proposed to operate channel 21 as either an independent or an affiliate of a fourth network being considered. It also slated a 1,766-foot (538 m) tower at Floyds Knobs, which the Federal Aviation Administration declined, citing an existing height limit of 1,000 feet (300 m). However, WEZI was never rebuilt.

In 1977, WDRB (channel 41) proposed a move to channel 21. However, Word Broadcasting Network also filed for channel 21. In 1981, an administrative law judge denied the WDRB application and preferred the competing bid from the Word Broadcasting Network, only for the FCC review board to overturn the decision. However, when WDRB was sold in 1983, the new owners dropped the channel 21 proposal, which cleared the way for WBNA to begin in 1986.
