= WLRS =

WLRS may refer to:

- WLRS (AM), a radio station (1570 AM) licensed to serve New Albany, Indiana, United States
- WLRS FM, a radio station in Louisville, Kentucky, United States, with frequency 102.3 FM, now WXMA, which held the call sign WLRS from 1964 to 1999
- WLUE (AM), a radio station (1600 AM) licensed to serve Eminence, Kentucky, United States, which held the call sign WLRS from 2013 to 2016
- WGHL, a radio station (105.1 FM) licensed to serve Shepherdsville, Kentucky, which held the call sign WLRS from 2000 to 2013
- Weapon Locating Radar, team for example "a WRLS Team"
