= WKYI =

WKYI may refer to:

- WLUE (AM), a radio station (1600 AM) licensed to serve Eminence, Kentucky, United States, which held the call sign WKYI from 2017 to 2018 and from 2018 to 2022
- WMYO-CD, a low-power television station (channel 18, virtual 24) licensed to serve Louisville, Kentucky, which held the call sign WKYI-CD from 2010 to 2017
