= Fox 34 =

FOX 34 may refer to one of the following television stations in the United States affiliated with the Fox Broadcasting Company:

== Current ==
- KJTV-TV in Lubbock, Texas
- KLSR-TV in Eugene, Oregon
- WDFX-TV in Dothan, Alabama

== Former ==
- WGRB (later WBKI-TV) in Campbellsville–Louisville, Kentucky (1990–1997)
