= WLLV =

- Louisville, Kentucky; United States
- Frequency: 1240 kHz
- Branding: Gospel 101.9 FM & 1240 AM

Programming
- Format: Urban gospel

Ownership
- Owner: Louisville Black Media; (Louisville Black Media LLC)
- Sister stations: WLOU

History
- First air date: June 1940
- Former call signs: WINN (1941–1982)
- Call sign meaning: "Love"

Technical information
- Licensing authority: FCC
- Facility ID: 1125
- Class: C
- Power: 530 watts
- Transmitter coordinates: 38°13′50″N 85°49′20″W
- Translator: 101.9 W270CR (Louisville)

Links
- Public license information: Public file; LMS
- Website: wllvonline.com

WLLV (1240 AM) is a commercial radio station licensed to Louisville, Kentucky, United States, and serving the Louisville metropolitan area, including sections of Kentucky and Indiana. Owned by Louisville Black Media, it features an urban gospel format, with studios on Muhammad Ali Boulevard in Louisville.

WLLV is also heard over low-power FM translator W270CR on 101.9 MHz in Louisville.

== History ==
The station signed on the air in June 1940 as WINN, an affiliate of the Mutual Broadcasting System.

By the 1960s, network programming had shifted from radio to television. In 1965, the station turned to country music, now affiliated with the ABC Entertainment Network. This continued until late 1982.

At that point, WINN was sold to a group of African-American pastors from the Chicago area. They switched the format to urban gospel music, and the callsign changed from WINN to WLLV. Popular announcers through the gospel programming years included Pastor James Ford, Elder Ben Higgins, Minister Ben Walker, Minister Sylvia Walker, gospel singer Archie Dale and Bishop D.V. Lyons.

In 2024, a new General Manager was named to head WLLV, WLOU and WMYO-CD. Steve Murphy had been the president of a private equity fund.

WLLV has undergone a power reduction from 1,000 watts to 530 watts due to the relocation of the station's tower for a sewer district project. Management hopes to have WLLV's signal restored to its 1,000–watt standard.
