= WLUE =

WLUE may refer to:

- WLUE (AM), a radio station (1600 AM) licensed to serve Eminence, Kentucky, United States
- WAYI, a radio station (104.3 FM) licensed to serve Charlestown, Indiana, United States, which held the call sign WLUE-FM from 2012 to 2014
- WSDF, a radio station (100.5 FM) licensed to serve Louisville, Kentucky, known as WLUE from August 2005 through September 2009
