= WLKY =

Television station in Louisville, Kentucky

- Louisville, Kentucky; United States
- Channels: Digital: 14 (UHF); Virtual: 32
- Branding: WLKY

Programming
- Affiliations: 32.1: CBS; for others, see § Subchannels

Ownership
- Owner: Hearst Television; (Hearst Properties Inc.)

History
- First air date: September 16, 1961
- Former channel numbers: Analog: 32 (UHF, 1961–2009); Digital: 26 (UHF, 2003–2019)
- Former affiliations: ABC (1961–1990)
- Call sign meaning: Louisville, Kentucky

Technical information
- Licensing authority: FCC
- Facility ID: 53939
- ERP: 710 kW
- HAAT: 391.6 m (1,285 ft)
- Transmitter coordinates: 38°22′8.4″N 85°49′47.6″W

Links
- Public license information: Public file; LMS
- Website: wlky.com

WLKY (channel 32) is a television station in Louisville, Kentucky, United States, affiliated with CBS. The station is owned by Hearst Television and maintains studios on Mellwood Avenue (near I-71) in the Clifton Heights section on Louisville's east side; its transmitter is located in rural northeastern Floyd County, Indiana (northeast of Floyds Knobs).

WLKY began broadcasting on September 16, 1961, bringing the full ABC schedule to Louisville. Previously, the city had had only two commercial stations, which together aired some of the network's programming. Originally based in Shively, the station moved to its present transmitter site in 1965 and its present studio facility in 1967. Its original owners, a consortium of mostly local investors, sold the station in 1967 to Sonderling Broadcasting, which in turn sold it to Combined Communications Corporation, which merged into Gannett in 1979. For most of its first 35 years on air, WLKY was the third-rated news station in Louisville, owing to a lack of news resources and its ultra high frequency (UHF) signal. Even when ABC obtained rights to telecast the Kentucky Derby beginning in 1975, Churchill Downs inserted a clause in its contract that allowed WHAS-TV (channel 11), then the CBS affiliate and the traditional Derby station, to simulcast the event, sharply curtailing its ratings and revenue potential for channel 32.

Pulitzer Broadcasting acquired WLKY in 1983 when Gannett sold it to buy a Boston station. The news department struggled to find its footing in the ratings, and in 1990, ABC affiliated with WHAS-TV, leaving WLKY to sign with CBS. The switch largely backfired on WHAS-TV by making the entire market more competitive; as part of its new affiliation, WLKY committed to news department expansion. Between 1996 and 1997, Pulitzer doubled the station's news output, doubled the size of its studio, and invested $8 million to make WLKY a contender. It also bought a radio station to serve as a promotional vehicle for channel 32's news department. After Pulitzer was acquired by Hearst in 1998, WLKY became the market's number-one station in ratings and revenue, a position challenged since the 2010s by the rise of WDRB (channel 41).

== Construction and early years ==
In 1959, two groups filed with the Federal Communications Commission (FCC) for permission to establish a new television station in Louisville, Kentucky, on channel 51. In May, United Electronics Laboratories (UEL) of Shively applied; the laboratory already had studios and only needed transmitter facilities, which it proposed to establish at the same site. A month later came a filing from Kentuckiana Television, a consortium of businessmen from Louisville and Evansville, Indiana—the latter two affiliated with that city's WTVW—headed by George Egger, former president of Morton Frozen Foods.

In September 1960, UEL withdrew and received an option to buy a stake in Kentuckiana Television, leading to an FCC recommendation in favor of the latter company's application and the issuance of a construction permit the next month. Kentuckiana Television selected the call sign WLKY and petitioned the FCC to exchange channel 51 for the lower channel 32, claiming it would provide a better service; the commission agreed in June, making three allocation changes in Indiana to support the allocation of channel 32 to Louisville.

With an hour-long dedication program, WLKY began broadcasting on September 16, 1961. The arrival of a third station portended major changes in television affiliations. Louisville had two stations—WAVE-TV (channel 3) and WHAS-TV (channel 11)—which were affiliated with NBC and CBS, respectively. Their lineups included a total of 16 ABC series, leaving network programs including The Untouchables, 77 Sunset Strip, and Surfside 6 unseen in Louisville. The previously seen programs migrated to channel 32 in the weeks after it signed on. It was the first commercial ultra high frequency (UHF) station in Louisville since WKLO-TV, which operated on channel 21 from October 1953 to March 1954. Louisville also had educational station WFPK-TV (channel 15), which shared the Shively studios.

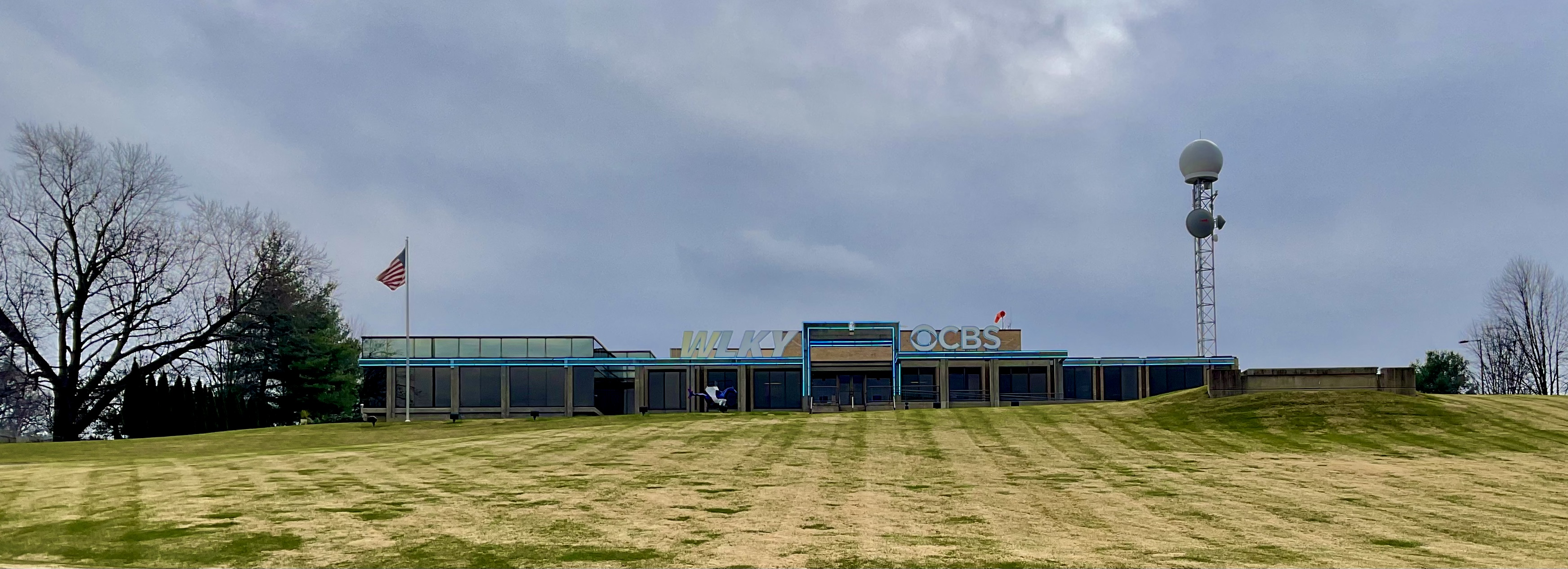
WLKY's studio facility east of downtown Louisville opened in 1967.

WLKY quickly outgrew the UEL site, which was distant from downtown Louisville. On October 20, 1965, the station began broadcasting at higher power from a new tower at Floyds Knobs, Indiana, where WAVE-TV and WHAS-TV had their towers. This increased channel 32's coverage radius from 9.3 miles (15.0 km) to 40 miles (64 km). In 1966, Kentuckiana Television broke ground on a new studio building on an 11-acre (4.5 ha) tract on Mellwood Avenue in Louisville's East End. The $1 million building entered into service in October 1967 and was equipped to originate local programming in color.

WLKY's early news department lacked resources. The original news staff numbered two people and lacked the use of local or national newsfilm, which debuted in 1964 and 1966, respectively. By 1967, there were four full-time news employees, less than half the 14 of WHAS-TV or 17 of WAVE-TV. They produced two newscasts on weeknights and a Sunday late night newscast.

== Sonderling ownership ==
The Sonderling Broadcasting Corporation of Oak Park, Illinois, acquired WLKY in a deal announced in 1967 and completed in 1968. WLKY became Sonderling's first television station among six radio stations as part of a corporate diversification move. The company paid $6.8 million, which at the time set a record for a UHF TV station.

News director Ken Rowland resigned in 1970, citing a difference of opinion with Sonderling, and joined the WHAS-TV staff. By the time his replacement as anchor, Chuck Rowell, was on the air, the station had rebranded its newscasts as Eyewitness News. WLKY's record of running ABC's network newscast during this period was intermittent. In 1969, WLKY ceased to air the ABC Evening News because program director John Dorkin felt it would have no audience as long as Frank Reynolds anchored. After Harry Reasoner replaced Reynolds, WLKY restored the evening news to its lineup in September 1971. WLKY was hardly alone; the network had 23 primary affiliates that did not clear the network news in early 1971, a factor that hurt the network's attempt to compete with CBS and NBC. The ABC Evening News rated so poorly that the station manager removed it from the lineup in January 1972, restoring the unusual situation where a network affiliate did not carry the network's national news program. Together with other preemptions of ABC programming, the decision prompted ABC to review its affiliation in Louisville. It took presentations from WLKY and WDRB (channel 41), the market's new independent station, and after two weeks, WLKY resumed airing the newscast. ABC opted to renew with WLKY.

For several years, WLKY was the originating station for telecasts of the Kentucky Colonels of the American Basketball Association. WLKY telecast the team in its first season, 1967–68, and for four seasons in the early 1970s, airing 15 to 19 road contests a season.

== Combined Communications and Gannett ownership ==
Citing "overriding corporate considerations", Sonderling announced the sale of WLKY to Combined Communications Corporation in August 1972. The deal received FCC approval in April 1973. Combined paid $8.3 million, not a record but in the upper echelon for UHF stations at the time, based on WLKY's multiple years of profit and network affiliation. In 1975, Combined upgraded the transmitter facility to increase channel 32's effective radiated power to 1.29 million watts.

Beginning in 1975, ABC secured television rights to the Kentucky Derby, long held by CBS. In almost any other circumstance, this would have provided WLKY with a signature program and very high viewership in the market. However, Churchill Downs included a clause in its contract that also permitted WHAS-TV to air the race if it so desired; WHAS-TV was the traditional Derby station, and the clause protected the parties' long-term relationship. Though WLKY produced a substantial amount of Derby Day programming in the years following the change, it was never able to surpass WHAS-TV and at one point carried little more than the network telecast. The WHAS simulcast clause persisted through 1987.

Even as ABC's ratings soared in the mid-1970s, WLKY remained Louisville's local news laggard. Viewers tuned in for ABC programs but largely deserted the station at 11 p.m. for the newscasts on WAVE-TV and WHAS-TV. In 1976, Combined hired Paul Blue, previously the manager of Denver public TV station KRMA-TV, to run channel 32, with revamping the news department an area of priority. A comprehensive overhaul followed. Roger Ogden, the news director at Combined's Denver station KBTV, was hired in the same role at WLKY. On April 18, 1977, WLKY debuted 32 Alive Newsroom, a new early and late news format, with only one holdover presenter on weeknights; there were two new anchors, and Rowland returned from WHAS. The format had been adopted the previous year at WXIA-TV in Atlanta, another Combined station, and included a newsroom set and the use of electronic news gathering. Though WLKY remained entrenched in third place in late news, its early report at 5:30 p.m. experienced a ratings surge in February 1978, boosted by bad weather and the wholesale change in anchors. Ogden returned to Denver after a year and was replaced by Bryan Norcross. Norcross departed after seeing the high salaries meteorologists could command when he tried to hire one for WLKY, leading him to pursue a degree in meteorology and become an on-camera personality.

On May 9, 1978, the Gannett Company announced that it would acquire Combined Communications in a $370 million all-stock deal, which was the largest transaction involving an American media company up to that point. The sale was approved by the FCC and finalized on June 7, 1979.

== Pulitzer Broadcasting ownership ==
In 1982, Gannett agreed to acquire WLVI-TV in Boston. Under FCC rules of the time, a company could only own five VHF and two UHF stations, with Gannett owning WLKY and WPTA in Fort Wayne, Indiana. At least one of these stations had to be sold to make room for the Boston station. Though Gannett needed only to sell one station, both were sold to the Pulitzer Publishing Company of St. Louis in 1983.

For WLKY-32 the '80s was a frustrating decade of searching for the anchor combination that would make its newscasts a front-runner instead of an also-ran.

— Tom Dorsey, The Courier-Journal

Under Pulitzer, WLKY added a half-hour of CNN Headline News to its schedule to bridge the gap between its local early news and ABC World News Tonight, a gap created when the network pushed back the live newscast. The station dropped Headline News in 1986, when the news department underwent an overhaul in hopes of improving its low ratings. That July, WLKY fired Rowland, who had anchored the news in Louisville for 22 years, and sportscaster Andy Leopold and moved its early evening newscast to 6 p.m. Observers believed that the sale of WHAS-TV by the Bingham family made it vulnerable to renewed competition. Rowland was replaced by Rick Little, most recently of KPIX-TV in San Francisco. Tom Dorsey of The Courier-Journal noted that the revamp gave WLKY a "straight and serious approach" but might have made it too similar to channels 3 and 11. Little was dismissed in January 1989, with station managing citing flat to declining ratings performance, and the station spent much of the year with the two-woman team of Liz Everman and Vicki Dortch on evenings, the first such permanent pairing in the market. At the end of the year, Bruce Dunbar, previously working at an Oklahoma City station, was named 6 p.m. co-anchor.

=== 1990 affiliation switch ===
On June 1, 1990, ABC informed WLKY that its 29-year affiliation was ending and the network was moving to WHAS-TV, a move that stunned WLKY and WHAS-TV's former network, CBS. WHAS made the move because it was unhappy with the ratings performance of CBS and felt ABC to be on the rise. Even though one network and one affiliate—CBS and WLKY—were unpaired, CBS first directed its attention toward wooing WAVE, which would have kept CBS on the VHF band and with a higher-rated station. When WAVE turned down CBS's proposals at the start of August, CBS entered into discussions with WLKY and signed an affiliation agreement on August 14. As part of the affiliation change, Pulitzer committed $2 million to news department expansion, including the addition of a satellite truck and noon and 5 p.m. local newscasts. WHAS and WLKY exchanged networks on September 9, 1990.

The switch did not have the ratings impact that WHAS-TV management expected. Though ratings for some CBS programs dropped with the move to channel 32 and WLKY's early evening news struggled, WLKY improved its ratings year-over-year, and WAVE news moved much closer to WHAS in the ratings. In general, the affiliation switch made Louisville a more competitive market. The persistence of WLKY in the market was later cited by CBS president Howard Stringer as a model for other stations following the New World–Fox pact of 1994, which touched off multiple affiliation switches in other markets.

In 1993, WLKY revamped its morning newscast with the debut of the hour-long Morning Report. Dunbar was demoted to reporter in 1994, and former sportscaster Rick Van Hoose was named chief male news anchor in his stead.

=== News department investment ===
In 1997, WLKY leased a helicopter (seen in 2013) on a full-time basis.

Gary Kueneke became the executive vice president of Pulitzer Broadcasting in 1996 and convinced management to invest in WLKY to make it competitive in the market. What resulted was some $8 million in expenditures to bolster the news department. In 1996, WLKY expanded its weekday and weekend morning newscasts and installed a Doppler radar system. The next year, Pulitzer leased a news helicopter on a full-time basis; expanded the studio building, doubling its size and accommodating more news staffers; and added a 5:30 p.m. newscast. From January 1996 to September 1997, WLKY increased its weekly news output from 17 hours to 36 1/2 and added 25 news staffers.

To further grow WLKY's news image, Pulitzer Broadcasting acquired the former WAVG (970 AM) in January 1997. It was relaunched that June as WLKY, simulcasting channel 32 and CBS newscasts along with Associated Press Radio News and sports rights. The station also aired press conferences and debates. It was operated as a loss leader to promote the TV news department.

== Hearst ownership ==
Pulitzer sold its broadcasting operation to Hearst-Argyle Television in 1998. Hearst-Argyle opted in 2000 to sell WLKY radio to the Truth Broadcasting Company, owned by Stuart Epperson, resulting in the station becoming a talk station as WGTK.

Under Hearst-Argyle, (Note: In 2009, the Hearst Corporation acquired Argyle's stake in the venture, took it private, and renamed it Hearst Television.) WLKY continued to become more competitive. In May 1999, its 6 p.m. newscast tied WHAS-TV in the ratings for the first time ever, and its noon and 5 p.m. newscasts were in close races with WHAS. The three major local stations were separated by only two percentage points of the audience in late news and at 5 p.m. in February 2001. That November, WLKY finished first at 11 p.m. for the first time, though the late news competition was regularly close among all three. CBS's national leadership in prime time viewership gave WLKY a strong lead-in at 11 p.m. whereas WHAS won most other timeslots. During this period, WLKY produced more hours of local news than any other local station. It also moved from fourth place in revenue to a narrow first-place position between 2002 and 2006. By 2011, WLKY led in all news time slots and total-day and prime time ratings.

In the 2010s, WLKY faced competition from WDRB, the former independent and Fox affiliate that had moved into second place by 2013. By 2020, WDRB had taken over number-one at 11 p.m. in households and total viewers, with WLKY second, while WLKY led in early evening news.

== Notable former on-air staff ==
- Wayne Freedman – reporter, 1970s
- Michael Gargiulo – reporter, early 1990s
- Mark Giangreco – sports anchor, 1979–1982 (known as Mark Greco at WLKY)
- Dan Lewis – anchor, 1977–1979
- Tom Mintier – reporter, 1977–1981
- Diane Sawyer – weathercaster, 1967–1970

== Technical information and subchannels ==
WLKY broadcasts from a transmitter in Floyds Knobs, Indiana. The station's signal is multiplexed:

Subchannels of WLKY
Subchannel	Res.	Short name	Programming
32.1	1080i	WLKY-HD	CBS
32.2	480i	ME TV	MeTV
32.4	480i	STORY	Story Television
32.6	480i	QVC2	QVC2
58.4	480i	Movies!	Movies! (WBKI)

Broadcast on behalf of another station

WLKY began digital broadcasting on February 24, 2003, on channel 26. It ceased analog broadcasts on June 12, 2009, the digital television transition date, and continued to broadcast on channel 26, using virtual channel 32. The station was repacked on October 18, 2019, to channel 14 as a result of the 2016 United States wireless spectrum auction.
