= WLRT =

- Nicholasville, Kentucky; United States
- Broadcast area: Lexington–Fayette metropolitan area
- Frequency: 1250 kHz
- Branding: La Explosiva 101.9 FM & 1250 AM

Programming
- Format: Regional Mexican music

Ownership
- Owner: New Albany Broadcasting Co., Inc.
- Sister stations: WLRS; WLUE

History
- First air date: December 1961
- Former call signs: WNVL (1961–1998); WUGR (1998–2003); WWFT (2003–2006); WVKY (2006–2009)

Technical information
- Licensing authority: FCC
- Facility ID: 36525
- Class: D
- Power: 500 watts day; 59 watts night
- Transmitter coordinates: 37°54′18.3″N 84°33′24.8″W
- Translator: 101.9 W270DE (Lexington)

Links
- Public license information: Public file; LMS
- Webcast: Listen live
- Website: laexplosivaradio.com

WLRT (1250 AM) is a commercial radio station licensed to Nicholasville, Kentucky and serving the Lexington–Fayette metropolitan area. It is owned by New Albany Broadcasting and airs a Regional Mexican music format, called "La Explosiva 101.9 FM & 1250 AM".

== History ==
In December 1961, WLRT first signed on as WNVL. It was originally a daytimer, required to be off the air at night, so it would not interfere with other stations on AM 1250. In the 1990s, WNVL got permission to broadcast at low power after sunset.

On June 15, 2019, WLRT rebranded as "La Explosiva 1250".
