= Roger L. Ogden =

American media executive

Roger Ogden is a broadcasting consultant and former president and CEO of Gannett Broadcasting.

Before becoming head of Gannett Broadcasting, Ogden was senior vice president of Gannett Broadcasting and president and general manager of KUSA-TV in Denver, where he began his Gannett career in 1967. He has worked at WLKY-TV in Louisville, KY, when it was owned by Gannett, and at a non-Gannett station in Denver. Ogden spent two years with NBC as president and managing director of NBC Europe. He was also President And GM For former NBC O&O KCNC-TV Ogden began his broadcast career on Denver radio at the age of 14.

Named 2007 Broadcaster of the Year by Broadcasting & Cable magazine.
