= Clifton Heights, Louisville =

Neighborhood in Louisville, Kentucky, US

Coordinates: 38°15′47″N 85°42′05″W

Clifton Heights is a neighborhood two miles east of downtown Louisville, Kentucky, US. It was named because of its hilly location atop a ridge about 100 feet above the Ohio River floodplain, overlooking the adjacent community of Clifton. Though first planned in the 1890s as Summit Park, actual growth didn't begin until after World War I when automobiles made the hilly area accessible. Clifton Heights has had an African American presence since its founding, in 2000 they accounted for 21% of the population. Housing stock includes a variety of styles and time frames, from older shotgun houses and bungalows to suburban ranch homes built in the 1970s.

Louisville's CBS television affiliate WLKY is located in Clifton Heights. A major production factory for Fischer's meats was located in the area for many decades before being relocated to Owensboro, Kentucky. The former factory building is now an arts and community center. The world's oldest water tower is located just to the community's north on the Ohio River.

Clifton Heights is bounded by I-71 on the north, Mellwood Avenue to the west, Birchwood Road on the east, and Brownsboro Road to the south. In 2000, Clifton Heights had a population of 3,667.

== Demographics ==
As of 2000, the population of Clifton Heights was 4,853, of which 69.5% is white, 21.5% is black, 5.2% is listed as other, and 3.7% is Hispanic. College graduates are 31.8% of the population, people w/o a high school degree are 16.5%. Females outnumber males 52% to 49%.
