= WAVE (TV) =

Television station in Louisville, Kentucky

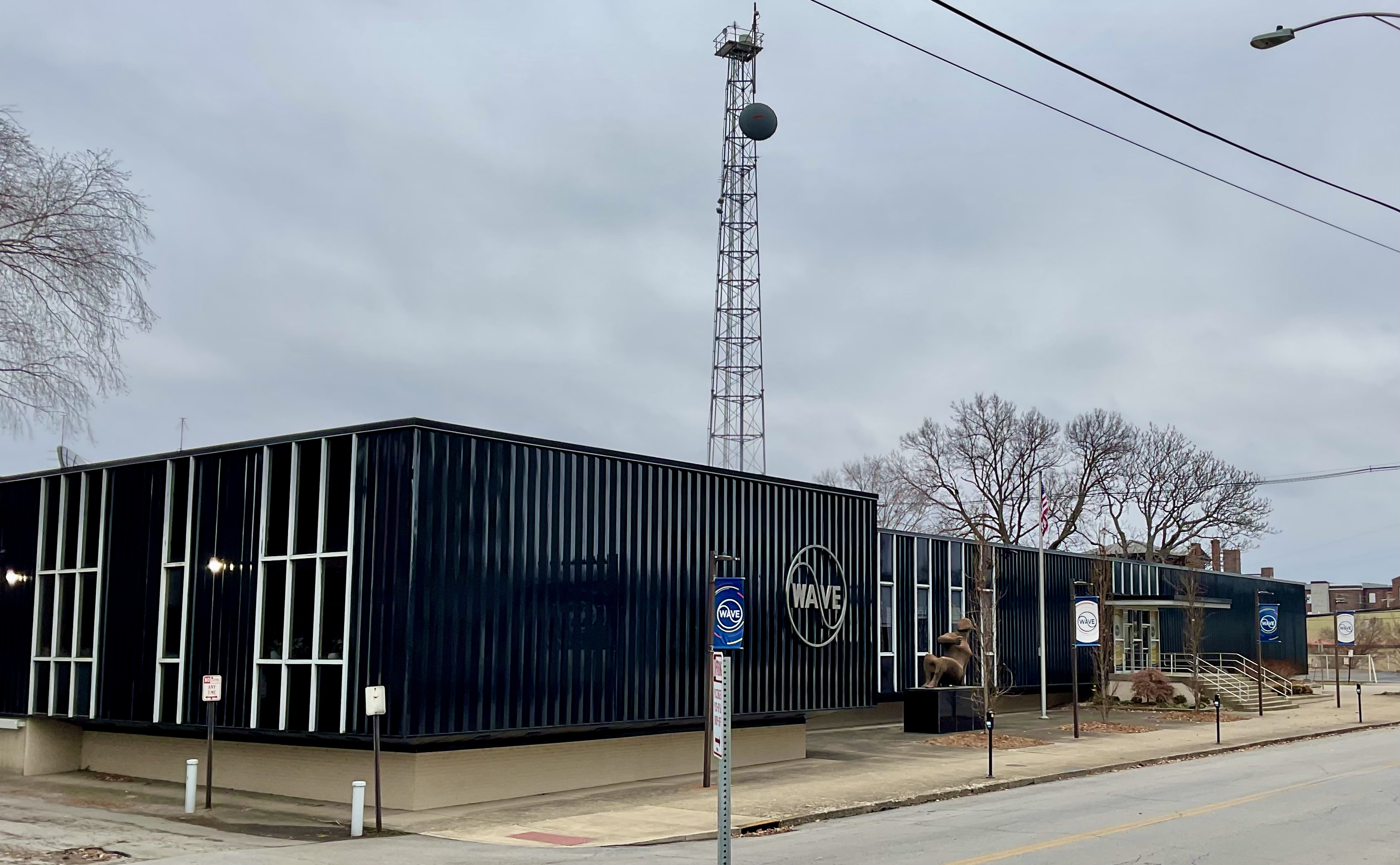
- WAVE's studios since 1959 on South Floyd Street in downtown Louisville. Banners on light poles in front of the building feature the station's logo.
- Louisville, Kentucky; United States
- Channels: Digital: 36 (UHF); Virtual: 3
- Branding: WAVE

Programming
- Affiliations: 3.1: NBC; for others, see § Subchannels

Ownership
- Owner: Gray Media; (Gray Television Licensee, LLC)
- Sister stations: WDRB; WBKI

History
- First air date: November 24, 1948
- Former call signs: WAVE-TV (1948–1987)
- Former channel numbers: Analog: 5 (VHF, 1948–1953), 3 (VHF, 1953–2009); Digital: 47 (UHF, 2000–2019)
- Former affiliations: All secondary: CBS (1948–1950); DuMont (1948–1955); ABC (1948–1961)
- Call sign meaning: The word "wave" (as in a radio wave)

Technical information
- Licensing authority: FCC
- Facility ID: 13989
- ERP: 890 kW
- HAAT: 391 m (1,283 ft)
- Transmitter coordinates: 38°22′8.4″N 85°49′47.6″W

Links
- Public license information: Public file; LMS
- Website: www.wdrbwave.com

WAVE (channel 3) is a television station in Louisville, Kentucky, United States, affiliated with NBC. It is owned by Gray Media alongside dual Fox/MyNetworkTV affiliate WDRB (channel 41) and CW affiliate WBKI (channel 58). The three stations share studios on South Floyd Street in downtown Louisville; WAVE's transmitter is located in Floyds Knobs, Indiana.

== History ==
The station first signed on the air on November 24, 1948, originally broadcasting on VHF channel 5 with an effective radiated power of 24,100 watts. WAVE was the first television station to sign on in the state of Kentucky, and the 41st to debut in the United States.

The station has been a primary NBC affiliate since its debut, owing to its sister radio station's longtime affiliation with the NBC Red Network; however, it also initially carried secondary affiliations with ABC, CBS and the DuMont Television Network. The national coaxial cable did not reach Louisville until 1950; prior to that, NBC programs were shown on film, as was national and foreign news.

On May 7, 1949, WAVE-TV became the first television station in the United States to present a live telecast of the Kentucky Derby. The station shipped a canned newsreel of the event to NBC to broadcast nationally. The telecast was the first use of a Zoomar Lens in a television sports broadcast. The lens was loaned to WAVE by inventor Frank Back. Not long after the Derby, WAVE acquired a Zoomar lens of its own, which was frequently loaned to the other stations owned by WAVE-TV.

WAVE-TV lost CBS programming when WHAS-TV (channel 11, now an ABC affiliate) signed on in March 1950; it later lost DuMont when the network folded in August 1956. Channel 3 continued to share ABC programming with WHAS-TV until WLKY (channel 32) signed on as a full-time affiliate in September 1961. It has remained with NBC since then, and as such, WAVE is the only commercial television station in the Louisville market that has never changed its primary network affiliation.

In 1953, WAVE-TV moved to VHF channel 3, due to signal interference issues with fellow NBC affiliate WLWT in Cincinnati. The move included a new, 100,000 watt transmitter and 600-foot (183 m) tower atop a 925-foot (282 m) (above sea level) knob above New Albany, Indiana. This increased WAVE-TV's coverage by 66%. WAVE-TV made history again in 1954 as it became the first station in Louisville to broadcast programming in color; viewers were treated to a vivid image of the new NBC Peacock logo when it made its 1956 debut.

During 1958–59, WAVE-TV produced in its studios educational programs for Jefferson County Schools—the forerunner of WFPK-TV (channel 15, now WKPC-TV). From 1954 to 1962, WAVE-TV also produced in its studio Tomorrow's Champions, a police-sponsored program for young amateur boxers. Muhammad Ali (then Cassius Clay) got his start there.

In July 1959, having long since outgrown its original studio facility on East Broadway (which now houses the Louisville offices for Metro United Way), WAVE-TV moved into its current downtown facility at 725 South Floyd Street. The new, specially designed building was dedicated with a commissioned opera, Beatrice, by Lee Hoiby. George Norton's wife, Jane Morton Norton, an accomplished artist herself, also commissioned original paintings for the building and statues for the adjacent WAVE Garden. The Garden, facing on Broadway, is a small park with water and greenery, now dedicated to the late George Norton. Three years later, in 1962, channel 3 became the first station in the region to transmit live, locally produced programming in color. By 1966, it was the only Kentucky station that processed its own news footage on color film and, in 1969, WAVE-TV became the first station in the market to employ a certified television meteorologist (Tom Wills) and operate its own weather-forecasting system.

The station notably refers to its coverage area as "WAVE Country", echoing a popular jingle and image campaign that the station introduced in the early 1970s. In fact, that very jingle served as the image campaign of the Al Ham-composed news music package "Home Country".

On January 18, 2022, WAVE-TV reintroduced a logo inspired by the station's 1960s logo (which has remained on the station's studio building since its opening and been restored in subsequent remodels), consisting of its call letters in a circle broken by a curved sine wave, which became the station's signature logo motif. It also dropped mention of channel 3 in most of its branding.

=== Ownership ===
WAVE-TV was founded and owned by George W. Norton Jr., a lawyer and financier who had also put WAVE radio (970 AM, now WGTK) on the air in 1933. Over the years, the Nortons acquired three other television stations and two other radio stations. They purchased WFIE-TV (Evansville, Indiana) in 1956; WFRV-TV (Green Bay, Wisconsin) and semi-satellite WJMN-TV (Marquette, Michigan) in 1961; and WMT-AM-FM-TV (Cedar Rapids, Iowa) in 1968, all of which shared a common logotype style. Following the last acquisition, the Norton holdings became known as Orion Broadcasting, "after a prominent and brilliant constellation". With WAVE-TV-AM serving as the flagship station, Orion greatly expanded its news, weather, editorials, agricultural programs, and documentaries. News bureaus were set up in Frankfort, Kentucky, and Washington, D.C. As a result, WAVE-TV-AM won a number of national awards, including a Peabody in 1978.

Orion merged with Liberty Corporation in 1981. WAVE-TV then became part of Liberty's broadcast arm, Cosmos Broadcasting. WAVE radio was then sold off; the WAVE cluster had been grandfathered when the FCC banned common ownership of radio and television stations in the same market in the 1960s, but lost its grandfathered protection with the Liberty merger. As the radio station promptly changed its call sign to WAVG, Cosmos dropped the "-TV" suffix from the WAVE callsign in 1987. In 1991, the station began transmitting its signal from a new broadcast tower in Oldham County; the 1,739 feet (530 m) transmitter tower (which is 70% taller than most television broadcast towers), which is the tallest structure in the state, cost $5 million to build and helped to improve WAVE's signal coverage. When the Liberty Corporation exited the insurance industry in 2000, WAVE came directly under the Liberty banner; in August 2005, Liberty announced that it would merge with Montgomery, Alabama–based Raycom Media; the sale was finalized on January 31, 2006. This brought it a new sister station nearby in the Cincinnati market to the north, Fox affiliate WXIX-TV.

==== Sale to Gray Television ====
On June 25, 2018, Atlanta-based Gray Television announced it had reached an agreement with Raycom to merge their respective broadcasting assets (consisting of Raycom's 63 existing owned-and/or-operated television stations, including WAVE, and Gray's 93 television stations) under Gray's corporate umbrella. The cash-and-stock merger transaction valued at $3.6 billion—in which Gray shareholders would acquire preferred stock currently held by Raycom—resulted in WAVE gaining new sister stations in nearby markets, including CBS affiliate WKYT-TV in Lexington (and its semi-satellite WYMT-TV in Hazard) and ABC/Fox affiliate WBKO in Bowling Green, in addition to its current Raycom sister stations. The sale was approved on December 20, and was completed on January 2, 2019.

With the acquisition of Meredith Corporation's Local Media division (including WSMV-TV in Nashville) on December 1, 2021, Gray now owns stations in every market in or surrounding Kentucky.

On August 1, 2025, Gray Media announced it would purchase Block Communications' television stations, including Fox affiliate WDRB (channel 41) and CW affiliate WBKI (channel 58). The $80 million transaction was approved by the Federal Communications Commission (FCC) on May 6, 2026, including authority for Gray to own three TV station licenses in the Louisville market, and completed the same day.

== Programming ==
=== News operation ===
WAVE presently broadcasts 53 1/2 hours of locally produced newscasts each week (with nine hours each weekday, four hours on Saturdays and 4 1/2 hours on Sundays); in addition, the station produces two live call-in discussion programs each weekday, Listens Live at 12:30 p.m. (following WAVE News at Noon) and WAVE Country with Dawne Gee at 2 p.m. (before InvestigateTV+ at 2:30 p.m.).

In the early days, both WAVE television and radio news was done live with Livingston Gilbert; he anchored for 39 years until his 1980 retirement.

Channel 3 was the ratings leader in the Louisville market for over 20 years, before WHAS-TV overtook it at #1 in the 1970s. The station has spent most of the last four decades as runner-up to WHAS-TV, though in recent years it has had to fend off a spirited challenge from WLKY. Louisville is also one of the few markets in the country where all four of the major network-affiliated stations have roughly equal ratings in recent years, although WLKY pulled ahead of WAVE, WHAS-TV and Fox affiliate WDRB (channel 41) during the May 2011 Nielsen ratings period.

On July 9, 1990, WAVE debuted the first 5 p.m. newscast in the Louisville market; titled FirstNews, it was anchored by veteran broadcaster Jackie Hays, who went on to become the longest-serving female anchor in the station's history (before WAVE, Hays anchored at then-NBC affiliate KYW-TV in Philadelphia; that station is currently a CBS O&O). Hays and co-anchor Don Schroeder were voted "Best TV News Anchor Team" and the station itself was chosen as "Best Source for Local News" by readers of Louisville Magazine. Jackie Hays retired from WAVE in 2009 and was inducted into the Kentucky Journalism Hall of Fame in 2011. Former chief meteorologist Tom Wills holds the record as the station's longest-tenured on-air personality, having been with WAVE from 1969 until his retirement in July 2009; Wills stated that he would serve as a fill-in whenever one of the station's meteorologists was on vacation, and announced that he was considering a return to the University of Louisville to teach meteorology as he did for several years. The station celebrated his 40-year tenure with the station during a special two-hour edition of WAVE 3 Listens Live, in which Wills's family and co-workers appeared as guests.

Meteorologist John Belski, who left channel 3 in September 2010 (he now works as a severe weather specialist for WLKY), received numerous awards during his 20+ years at WAVE, including being named "Best Of Louisville" by the readers of Louisville Magazine for a number of years and was named "Best of Kentucky" by the readers of Kentucky Monthly magazine, as well as receiving the LEO's Readers' Choice Award and a "Best of the Best" award from Louisville Magazine (which is given to people and organizations that have won the "Best of Louisville" award more than 10 times). Belski anchored severe weather coverage that earned him and the station several Emmy Awards; he was also presented the prestigious Mark Trail Award for bringing public awareness to weather radios as a lifeline during severe weather, which was presented to Belski on Capitol Hill in Washington, D.C. Sports director Kent Taylor was voted "Kentucky TV Sportscaster of the Year" by the Associated Press in 2008, 2009 and 2012.

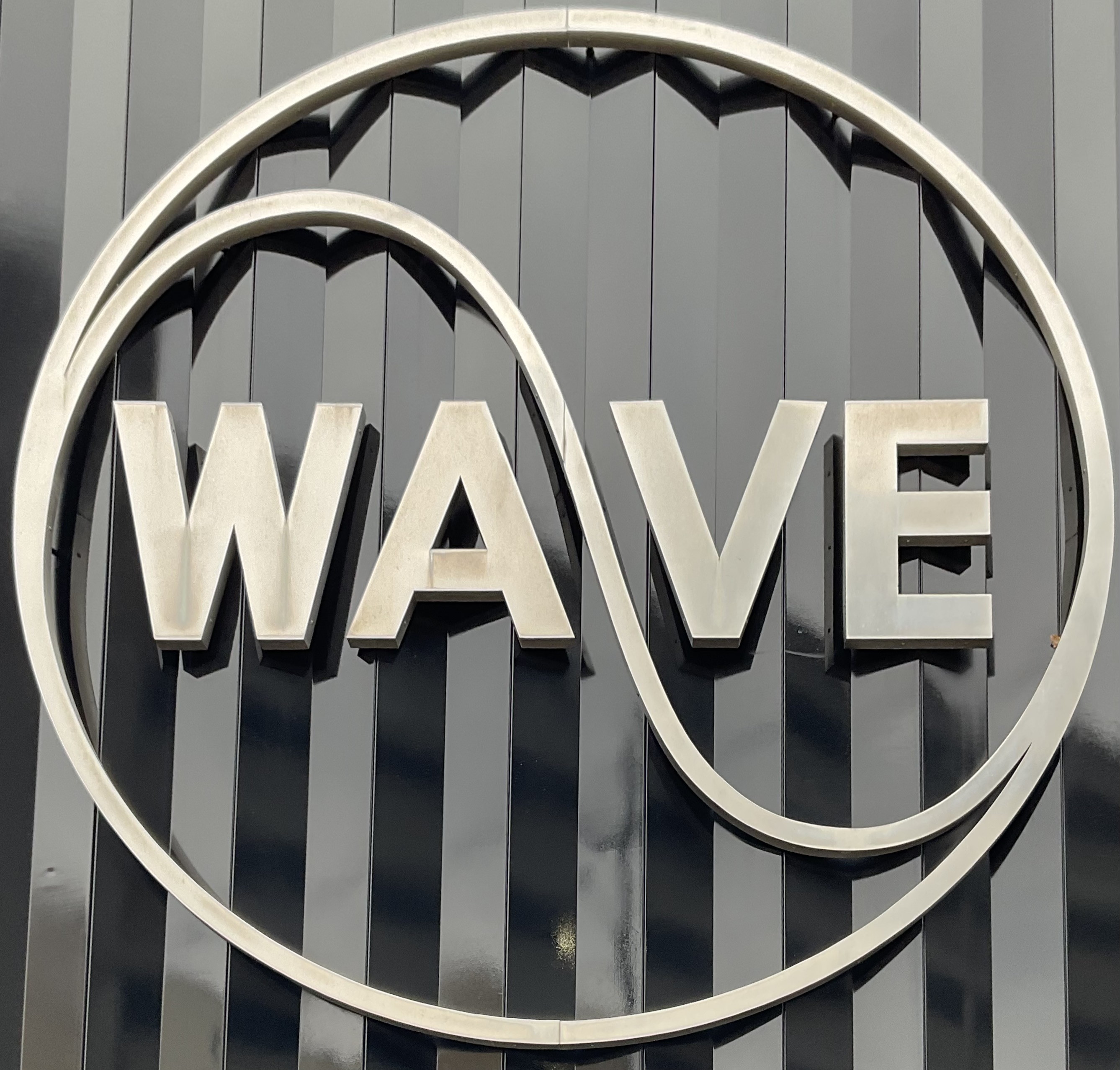
WAVE introduced an updated version of its classic 1962–1970 sine wave-inspired logo on the front of its studios in the run-up to the television station's 75th anniversary in 2023.

On June 30, 2008, WAVE became the first television station in the Louisville market to begin broadcasting its local newscasts in high definition. WAVE is the only one of two stations that broadcast at least some portion of their newscasts in HD; footage shot in-studio is broadcast in high definition, while all news video from on-remote locations is broadcast in standard definition.

In March 2011, WAVE and WHAS-TV began sharing a news helicopter supplied by St. Louis-based Helicopters Inc., through a Local News Service agreement, allowing the two stations to share news video, especially during breaking news events, while also partitioning time for individual use of the chopper. The starboard side of the copter displays a "Sky 11" decal (referencing WHAS-TV), while the port side carries the "Air 3" logo (referencing WAVE).

Following a disappointing November 2011 sweeps period, WAVE moved its midday newscast from noon to 11 a.m. in January 2012. With the change, WAVE is the only station in the market whose midday newscast airs in the 11 a.m. timeslot (however, WDRB has carried a newscast at 11:30 a.m. since 1999). The midday newscast was rebroadcast at 1 p.m. on independent station WBNA (channel 21). In 2013, WAVE began airing rebroadcasts of its 7 and 7:30 p.m. newscasts on its Bounce TV-affiliated third digital subchannel at 8 p.m. In 2016, the 7 and 7:30 p.m. newscasts began simulcasting live on Bounce 3.2.

The station added a half-hour 3 p.m. newscast on January 28, 2019; it expanded to a full hour on September 9. On April 24, 2020, WAVE added an additional hour of news each weekday at 4 p.m.

==== Notable former on-air staff ====
- Foster Brooks – show host
- Mary Ann Childers – reporter
- Allen Denton – anchor
- Emily Gimmel – teen feature reporter
- Steve Kmetko – anchor (1981–1982)
- Dave Nakdimen – reporter (1961–1997)

=== Sports programming ===
During the 1990s and 2000s, WAVE carried Southeastern Conference football and basketball through Jefferson-Pilot Sports (later Lincoln Financial Sports) which merged into Raycom Sports in 2007–08, although some football games were aired on WBKI-TV or WFTE (now WBKI). This ended in 2009 when Raycom Sports, coincidentally a subsidiary of WAVE's current owner, lost the rights to ESPN Regional Television at the end of the 2008–09 basketball season. The SEC syndication package by ESPN Plus ended up with WBNA throughout the 2009–2014 existence of the syndicated SEC Network (later SEC TV).

In 2014, after the University of Louisville joined the Atlantic Coast Conference, WAVE and WHAS-TV began sharing Raycom Sports' ACC Network package until its discontinuation in 2019.

As the network's affiliate for the region, WAVE serves as the de facto flagship station for NBC Sports' coverage of the Kentucky Derby; in 1949, WAVE was the first broadcaster to ever produce television coverage of the race. Presently, WAVE carries locally produced coverage of Kentucky Oaks day; most races (aside from early races that are shared with FanDuel TV) are carried on a tape delay, as NBC Sports holds exclusive rights to televise them live on its platforms. In 2026, the Kentucky Oaks was broadcast in prime time nationally by NBC.

In 2025, as part of a groupwide deal with Gray, WAVE began simulcasting select Cincinnati Reds baseball games from FanDuel Sports Network Ohio; the opening game aired on the station's main NBC channel, with the remaining contests being shown primarily on its Bounce subchannel.

== Technical information ==
=== Subchannels ===
The station's signal is multiplexed:

Subchannels of WAVE
Subchannel	Res.	Short name	Programming
3.1	1080i	WAVE HD	NBC
3.2	480i	Bounce	Bounce TV
3.3	480i	The365	365BLK
3.4	480i	Grit	Grit
58.1	720p	WBKI-CW	The CW (WBKI)
58.2	480i	COZI	Cozi TV (WBKI)

Broadcast on behalf of another station

WAVE-DT2 carried This TV programming from 2008 until 2014, when it was replaced by Bounce TV, with This moving to WKYI-CD. Bounce TV was carried on WAVE-DT3 (channel 3.3) until it was moved up to channel 3.2 to make way for the Grit TV network in late 2014.

=== Analog-to-digital conversion ===
WAVE ended regular programming on its analog signal, over VHF channel 3, on June 12, 2009, the official date on which full-power television stations in the United States transitioned from analog to digital broadcasts under federal mandate. The station's digital signal remained on its pre-transition UHF channel 47, using virtual channel 3.

== Out-of-market coverage ==
WAVE is available on cable providers in the eastern portion of the Evansville market (in Dubois and Perry counties), the southern portion of the Indianapolis (in Lawrence County) and Cincinnati (in Ripley and Switzerland counties in Indiana, and Owen County in Kentucky) markets, the northern portion of the small Bowling Green market (in Hart County), and on cable providers in the westernmost portion of the Lexington market (in Anderson County). WAVE had been carried on Frankfort Plant Board's cable system in Frankfort, which is part of the Lexington market; cable providers in Frankfort have carried stations from both Lexington and Louisville for decades. On December 20, 2017, the Frankfort Plant Board announced that it would drop WAVE and competitor WHAS on January 1, 2018, in order to curb rising retransmission consent costs that were being passed on to its customers. While they announced the continued carriage of WHAS on December 29, 2017; WAVE was still dropped on January 1. On December 28, 2020, the FPB Board of Directors voted to approve a retransmission consent agreement with Gray Television negotiated by the National Cable Television Cooperative for WAVE and in-market CBS affiliate WKYT, bringing the NBC affiliate back starting in January 2021. After the three-year hiatus, WAVE officially returned to its former channel slots on 3 and 503 on January 12, 2021. FPB also began carrying Grit from WAVE-DT4 on channel 98 following the discontinuation of the network on in-market ABC affiliate WTVQ-DT's seventh subchannel. The latter practice ended when in-market NBC affiliate WLEX-TV replaced their MeTV affiliation with Grit in September 2022.

WAVE was also available to all customers of the cable system of Glasgow, Kentucky-based South Central Rural Telephone Cooperative (SCRTC), which serve Barren, Hart, and Metcalfe counties in the Bowling Green media market, Green and Larue counties (within the Louisville market), as well as Monroe County, which is in the Nashville media market. WAVE and WHAS were dropped in January 2018 from the SCRTC's systems in Barren, Hart, Metcalfe and Monroe Counties due to local NBC affiliate WNKY (and in Monroe County's case, WSMV-TV) claiming market exclusivity. WAVE's Bounce TV subchannel was replaced with that of WCZU-LD.
