= WDRB =

Television station in Louisville, Kentucky

- Louisville, Kentucky; United States
- Channels: Digital: 32 (UHF); Virtual: 41
- Branding: WDRB

Programming
- Affiliations: 41.1: Fox; 41.2: Independent with MyNetworkTV; for others, see § Subchannels

Ownership
- Owner: Gray Media; (Gray Television Licensee, LLC)
- Sister stations: WAVE, WBKI

History
- First air date: February 28, 1971
- Former call signs: WDRB-TV (1971–1997)
- Former channel numbers: Analog: 41 (UHF, 1971–2009); Digital: 49 (UHF, 2001–2019)
- Former affiliations: Independent (1971–1986); Antenna TV (41.2, 2011–2026)
- Call sign meaning: Derby

Technical information
- Licensing authority: FCC
- Facility ID: 28476
- ERP: 1,000 kW
- HAAT: 390.4 m (1,281 ft)
- Transmitter coordinates: 38°21′1″N 85°50′57″W

Links
- Public license information: Public file; LMS
- Website: wdrbwave.com

WDRB (channel 41) is a television station in Louisville, Kentucky, United States, affiliated with Fox and MyNetworkTV. It is owned by Gray Media alongside NBC affiliate WAVE (channel 3) and CW affiliate WBKI (channel 58). The three stations share studios on South Floyd Street in downtown Louisville; WDRB's transmitter is located in rural northeastern Floyd County, Indiana (northeast of Floyds Knobs).

WDRB went on the air in February 1971 as the first independent station in the Louisville market, being owned in turn by a Missouri consortium, the Minneapolis Star & Tribune Company, and Block Communications. It affiliated with Fox at the network's launch in 1986 and began producing local newscasts in 1990. Initially starting with just one newscast at 10 p.m., in the 2000s and 2010s it expanded its news operation into morning and evening time slots. Gray Media, owner of WAVE, acquired WDRB and WBKI in 2026.

== History ==
The first construction permit for channel 41 in Louisville was issued in 1953 to Robert Rounsaville, owner of WLOU (1350 AM), Louisville's first Black-oriented radio station. The station, if built, would have been the first Black-oriented TV station in the country. However, the construction of WQXL-TV depended on the success of the first of three planned stations, Atlanta's WQXI-TV, which failed and left the air in 1955. The permit remained active for several more years; the call letters were changed to WTAM-TV, and in 1963 the permit was sold to Producers, Inc., of Evansville, Indiana, but no station ever materialized. Producers was related to the Polaris Corporation, which in Louisville owned WKYW (900 AM).

=== As an independent station ===
On July 7, 1965, Consolidated Broadcasting Company, a group of five people from Chillicothe, Missouri, with no television station experience at the time (but who were eventually shareholders in KCIT-TV in Kansas City), filed for a construction permit for the channel. The permit was granted on April 20, 1966, but it would be nearly five years before any station came to air. Antenna height issues and permitting setbacks caused delays for the new WDRB-TV and for another applicant on channel 21. Approval was finally obtained that summer, and Consolidated renovated a building that had housed a lithograph studio on East Main Street in the Butchertown neighborhood to serve as WDRB-TV's studios.

WDRB-TV finally signed on the air on February 28, 1971, becoming the first independent station in the Louisville market. Initially, the station signed on at 3 p.m. on weekdays; its programming included low-budget afternoon children's programming, occasional news updates provided by anchor Wilson Hatcher, and, most notably, the Saturday night horror film strand Fright Night, hosted by local theater actor Charlie Kissinger. Not long after going on air, WDRB-TV debuted an afternoon children's program, Presto the Magic Clown, hosted by Bill "Presto" Dopp. The station was profitable within months and unexpectedly respectable, matching then-ABC affiliate WLKY (channel 32) in the ratings, even without a local news department. General manager Elmer Jaspan credited the station's immediate success to a strong signal, programming, and the fact that the Louisville market already had a commercial UHF station.

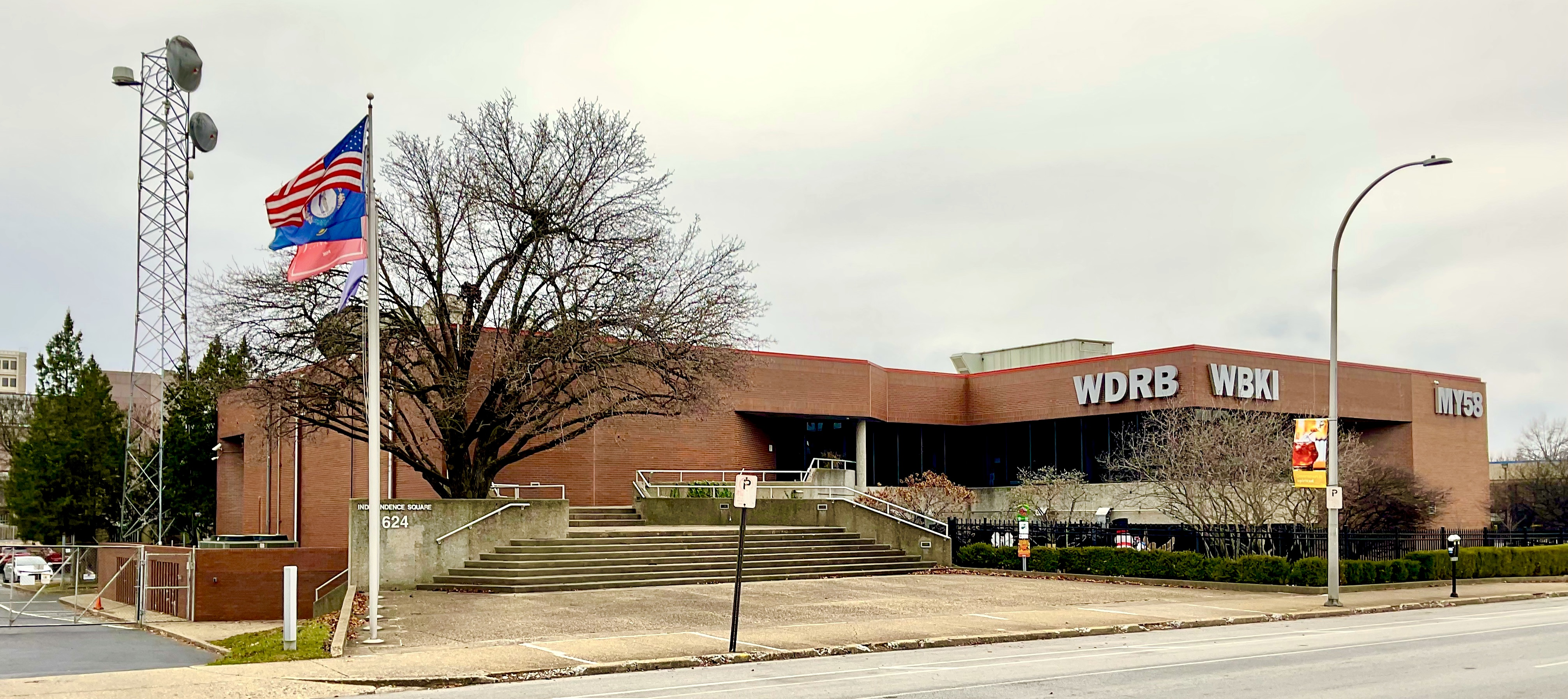
WDRB's former studio on Muhammad Ali Blvd. in downtown Louisville from 1980 to 2026, which was expanded multiple times to accommodate its sister stations and expanding news operation.

Consolidated Broadcasting Corporation sold the station in 1977 to the Minneapolis Star & Tribune Company (which later became the Cowles Media Company) for $6.5 million. In 1980, the station moved from Butchertown to then-new studios on Muhammad Ali Boulevard. However, one upgrade that Cowles sought failed to materialize. Beginning in late 1977, WDRB-TV had campaigned for a shift to channel 21. In 1981, however, an administrative law judge denied the application and preferred the competing bid from the Word Broadcasting Network, only for the FCC review board to overturn the decision.

Cowles exited television in the early 1980s; after selling its only other station, KTVH in Hutchinson, Kansas, it sold WDRB to Block Communications of Toledo, Ohio, for $10 million in 1983. Under Block, WDRB-TV dropped the channel 21 application, clearing the way for WBNA to launch on the channel. Block began to increase WDRB's profile in the market by acquiring higher-rated and more recent off-network sitcoms and dramas to its schedule, along with a focus on the broadcast rights for the burgeoning athletic programs of the University of Louisville's Cardinals, which the station won in 1985 and held for two years.

=== As a Fox affiliate ===
On October 9, 1986, WDRB-TV became an affiliate of the Fox network. For a time in the 1990s, it was one of two affiliates serving the overall market: in 1992, Campbellsville-based WGRB (channel 34, later CW affiliate WBKI-TV) affiliated with the network. WDRB became the sole Fox station in Louisville when WGRB became affiliated with The WB in 1997.

Former primary logo for WDRB under the "Fox 41" branding, used from c. 2000 to May 2011.

In 1990, the station also regained rights to Louisville athletics after the university spent three years with WHAS-TV and upgraded its transmitter, improving signal coverage. In 1994, Block Communications entered into a local marketing agreement to operate Salem, Indiana–based WFTE (channel 58, later WMYO, now WBKI), which it programmed with new syndicated shows and programs channel 41 no longer had time to air due to Fox network commitments. Block acquired WFTE outright in 2001, creating the first television station duopoly in the Louisville market; this was allowed by the FCC even though there were fewer than eight unique commercial station owners because WFTE had only been put on the air as a result of the original local marketing agreement.

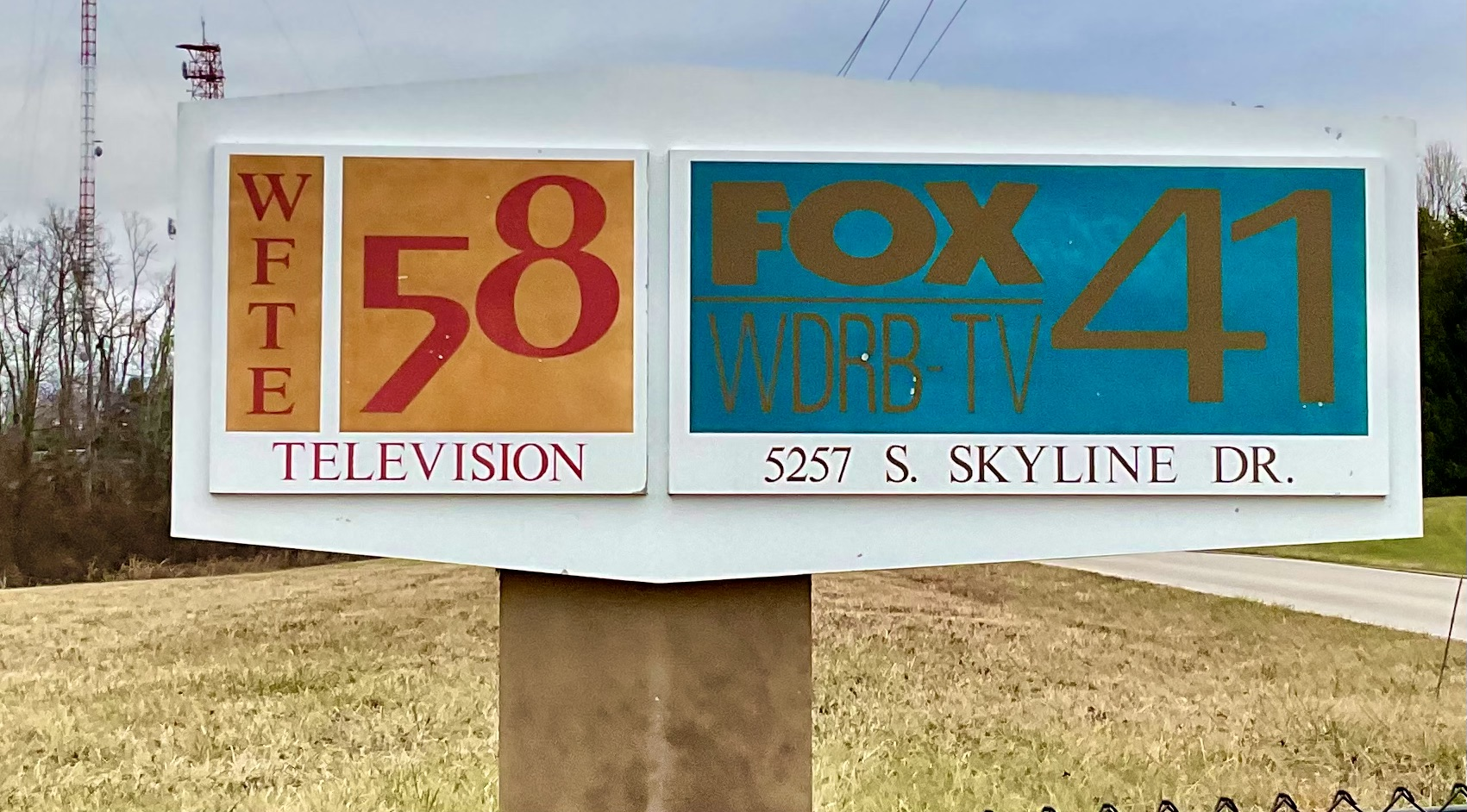
WDRB's logo from 1994 remains on the entrance sign to its transmitter site north of Louisville atop Floyds Knobs, Indiana, when the transmitter for what was then WFTE was added to WDRB's site.

On April 21, 2007, WDRB became the first television station in Louisville to televise the Kentucky Derby Festival's all-day "Thunder Over Louisville" air and fireworks show in high definition—which, at the time, was one of the largest technical undertakings ever attempted by an American television station. This was followed by a second—even more elaborate—"Thunder" telecast in HD in April 2008 as part of a new agreement under which the four major news-producing stations rotated the rights to Thunder.

The station began phasing out the "Fox 41" branding in favor of simply branding by the WDRB call letters in May 2011. While this occurred shortly after sister station KTRV-TV in Boise, Idaho, unexpectedly lost its Fox affiliation, station management stated that the rebrand was done in order to bring its branding in line with Louisville's other major network stations, which have all long branded with their call letters. Additionally, management wanted to distinguish the station from Fox News Channel.

In May 2013, WDRB began construction of an additional 11,000 square feet (1,022 m^{2}) of space at its Muhammad Ali Boulevard studio facility, including an expanded newsroom and sales area; the addition of two conference rooms; offices for finance and editing departments; and the addition of a secondary studio to be used for commercial and station projects. The $1.7 million expanded facility opened on May 5, 2014; as a result of the expansion, sister station WBKI-TV relocated its 10 employees from that station's offices in the Kaden Tower into the WDRB facility. Bill Lamb, who had been general manager of Block's Louisville stations since 2001, was hired by Fox Television Stations in 2019 to run that company's KTTV and KCOP-TV in Los Angeles.

On August 1, 2025, Gray Media announced it would purchase Block's television stations, including WDRB and WBKI. The $80 million transaction would put the stations under common operation with NBC affiliate WAVE (channel 3). The sale was approved by the Federal Communications Commission (FCC) on May 6, 2026, including authority for Gray to own three TV station licenses in the Louisville market, and completed the same day.

== News operation ==
After more than a year of planning, WDRB launched its news department on March 12, 1990, with the debut of a half-hour 10 p.m. newscast, originally titled The News at 10. Several longtime news personalities in the Louisville market joined the new WDRB news staff when the station formed its news operation. The News at 10 was originally anchored by Lauretta Harris (who joined WDRB from WAVE), Jim Mitchell (who started in the market at WHAS-TV, before moving to WAVE), meteorologist Tammy Garrison, and sports anchor David Sullivan. A weekend edition of The News at 10 debuted that October, pairing ex-WLKY staffer Bill Francis with Susan Sweeney, who prior to joining channel 41 had worked at WHAS radio.

In 1995, the program was retitled as Fox News at 10 and expanded to one hour. WDRB launched additional newscasts on its schedule as its ratings position in the market strengthened: the first news expansion outside its established 10 p.m. slot came on October 5, 1998, when WDRB premiered the three-hour-long Fox in the Morning and a half-hour midday newscast at 11:30 a.m. (originally titled Fox First News); the latter program expanded to an hour on September 21, 2015, with the addition of a half-hour noon newscast. This was later followed by the debut of an hour-long 4 p.m. newscast in September 2001 and weekly editorials by general manager Bill Lamb, the first on any Louisville station since the 1980s, in 2002. The morning newscast was retooled in 2003 as a news-oriented program after ratings took a nosedive during the start of the Iraq War.

Since 2011, WDRB has continued to fill out its newscast schedule, with evening newscasts at 6:30 p.m. in 2011, 6 p.m. in 2014, and 5 p.m. news in 2019, the latter hosted by longtime WAVE anchor Scott Reynolds. One expansion—a 7 p.m. newscast for WBKI-TV (channel 34), was broadcast from 2012 to 2015. The station also has added morning newscasts, including weekend morning news in 2013 and a 9 a.m. weekday morning news extension in 2023.

In June 2013, WDRB gained notice in the television industry when it debuted a promo criticizing the broad, constant and generalized use of the term "breaking news" by other news stations (both within the Louisville market and around the United States), stating that "breaking news" has been overused as a "marketing ploy" by other stations, who tend to apply the term to stories that are low in urgency and/or relevance. To coincide with the promo, WDRB posted on its website a "contract" outline of its journalism practices with its viewers and advertisers, with the former list promising to judiciously use "breaking news" (applying the term to stories that are "both 'breaking' and 'news'"), as well as a general promise to deliver news in a truthful, balanced and informative manner, and without overt hype and sensationalism.

The station gained national attention in November 2019 for a sweeps interview with the founder of Papa John's Pizza, John Schnatter (who had been a controversial local figure since his July 2018 ouster over use of a racial slur on a conference call). Schnatter had made the claim to WDRB's Stephan Johnson that he had found the quality control of the chain had declined after saying he ordered forty pizzas to eat from it in a month-long period and warned of a 'day of reckoning' for company board member Mark Shapiro for participating in Schnatter's ouster from the company.

== Technical information ==
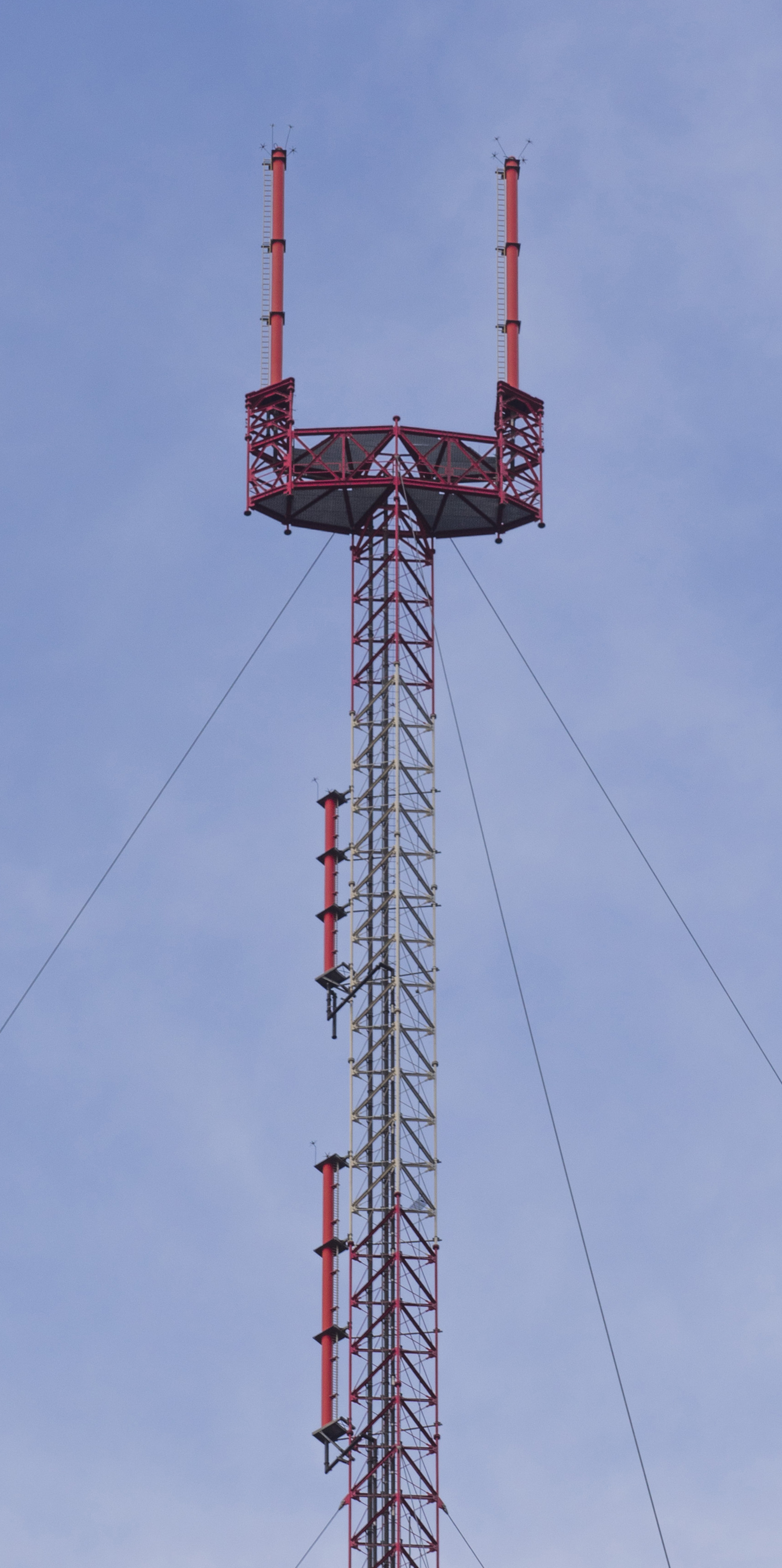
The WDRB–WBKI tower near Floyds Knobs in southern Indiana.

=== Subchannels ===
WDRB broadcasts from a tower near Floyds Knobs, Indiana. The station's signal is multiplexed:

Subchannels of WDRB
Subchannel	Res.	Short name	Programming
41.1	720p	WDRB	Fox
41.2	720p	My TV	Independent with MyNetworkTV
41.3	480i	ION.TV	Ion
41.4	480i	CourtTv	Court TV
58.3	480i	Ant.TV	Antenna TV (WBKI)
58.5	480i	Mystery	Ion Mystery (WBKI)
58.6	480i	Ion +	Ion Plus (WBKI)

Broadcast on behalf of another station

WDRB began broadcasting three subchannels of WBKI as part of that multiplex's September 2022 conversion to ATSC 3.0 (NextGen TV) broadcasting.

=== Analog-to-digital conversion ===
WDRB ended regular programming on its analog signal, over UHF channel 41, on June 12, 2009, the official date on which full-power television stations in the United States transitioned from analog to digital broadcasts under federal mandate. The station's digital signal remained on its pre-transition UHF channel 49, using virtual channel 41. The station was repacked from channel 49 to channel 32 in 2019.
