= Cane Valley, Kentucky =

Unincorporated community in Kentucky, United States

Cane Valley
- Unincorporated community
- Location within the state of Kentucky Cane Valley (the United States)
- Coordinates: 37°10′49″N 85°19′11″W
- Country: United States
- State: Kentucky
- County: Adair
- Elevation: 784 ft (239 m)
- Time zone: UTC-6 (Central (CST))
  - Summer (DST): UTC-5 (CDT)
- ZIP code: 42720
- GNIS feature ID: 488805

Cane Valley is an unincorporated community in Adair County, Kentucky, United States. Its elevation is 784 feet (239 m). It is located on Kentucky Route 55.

== Media ==
Cane Valley had the first studio and transmission facility for WBKI-TV.
