= Dave Nakdimen =

American broadcaster (1933–2020)

- Born: David Abie Nakdimen; June 28, 1933; Rocky Station, Lee County, Virginia, US
- Died: May 8, 2020 (aged 86); Louisville, Kentucky, US
- Occupations: Television journalist, radio journalist, political analyst, investigative reporter, news documentary producer
- Years active: 1961–1997

Dave Nakdimen (June 28, 1933 – May 8, 2020) was an American broadcast journalist, and the political reporter for Louisville's WAVE 3 (TV) News. Nakdimen covered many major stories in Louisville during his long career. He was elected to the Kentucky Journalism Hall of Fame in 1998.

== Biography ==
David Abie Nakdimen was born in Rocky Station, Lee County, Virginia on June 28, 1933, the second of Lucy (née Steelman) and Abe Nakdimen's four children.

== Education and early journalism career ==
Nakdimen graduated from London High School in London, Kentucky.

In the 1950s, Nakdimen attended the University of Kentucky as a Journalism student, where he performed research, collecting folklore in 1954 for William Hugh Jansen. Jansen had received the third Doctorate in Folklore in the United States from the Indiana University and was a member of the faculty of the University of Kentucky English Department from 1949 to 1979. Nakdimen was a member of the University of Kentucky's billiard team. Nakdimen and the team placed eighth in the National Intercollegiate Billiard tournament held February 23, 1954.

While a student, Nakdimen also reported for the Kentucky Kernel. Nakdimen graduated with a degree in journalism.

His first professional job after graduation was as a sports reporter for the Lexington Leader, then the afternoon newspaper in Lexington, Kentucky. Nakdimen was also a correspondent for the Louisville Courier-Journal in 1960.

== Louisville City Hall reporter ==
Known as "Dave Nakdimen" on-air and "Nak" inside the newsroom, Nakdimen joined WAVE (radio and television) News at the age of 28 on July 4, 1961. He was hired as the "City Hall" reporter. Nakdimen said of his hiring "WAVE was looking for somebody to cover City Hall," he said. "I had never worked a day on radio or TV in my life, but I decided to take a shot at it".

In his first two weeks on the job, he met NBC news anchor David Brinkley and Ronald Reagan, then host of the General Electric Theater. He said "it was fun to talk with John Wayne, sit down with George Bush and chase Hubert Humphrey around".

== Political reporter ==
Nakdimen's reporting professionalism and expertise quickly earned him the political reporter position at WAVE TV. Nakidimen covered Louisville and Jefferson County government, the Kentucky legislature, along with gubernatorial and other state and national elections for WAVE TV for 36 years.

Nakdimen broke the story of the collapse of Louisville's Prudential Savings and American Building loan associations in the 1970s. Nakdimen also covered the Louisville area floods of 1964 and 1997, the 1978 blizzard, the open housing demonstrations of 1967, the tornados of 1974 and 1996, the Jefferson County school desegregation and court-ordered busing in 1975, the 1989 Standard Gravure shootings and other top stories including covering seven national political conventions.

Nakidimen interviewed Dr. Martin Luther King Jr. during an open housing march in Louisville during the 1960s. After the interview, Nakdimen discovered his film camera hadn't correctly recorded the audio of the interview. "So when King came around the block again, we asked him if he'd do the interview over and he was nice enough to do it".

=== Election coverage ===
Nakdimen provided live and recorded remote coverage of the July 1984 Democratic national convention held in San Francisco, California for WAVE TV News. Additional commentary was provided by then WAVE anchor Don Schroeder who accompanied Nakdimen on the trip.

During the 1988 presidential election coverage, then WAVE TV general manager Guy Hempel decided to "send the guy (Nakdimen) with years of local political reporting rather than anchor people" to cover the New Orleans Republican presidential convention that nominated incumbent Vice President George H. W. Bush.

=== Louisville / Jefferson County (Kentucky) reorganization coverage ===
In 1982, Nakdimen moderated a cable news show discussing the effort to reorganize the city of Louisville and Jefferson County, Kentucky as a combined metro government entity. Then County Judge Mitch McConnell and Louisville Mayor Harvey Sloane fielded phone calls during a live television show carried by the county and city cable television carriers.

The 1982 vote for the Louisville / Jefferson County reorganization was predicted by all local television news departments as "an easy win". However, the referendum was "too close to call" four hours after the polls had closed. By 10:30 pm that evening, with 98% of the vote counted, the merger had been defeated. Nakdimen said "Modern computer science sometimes falls short and it did this time".

In 1983, Nakdimen moderated a debate on government merger with representatives from both sides on the show Debate: The New Charter broadcast on WAVE TV on November 6, 1983.

=== Commentator ===
In 1970, Nakdimen was part of a WAVE TV News team that created Closeup: Report From Frankfort. The public affairs program was syndicated by the Kentucky Department of Public Information and was broadcast weekly in four cities in Kentucky and one in West Virginia. The 30-minute show featured "guest officials and legislators on issues vital to Kentuckians". Nakdimen frequently appeared as an interviewer on the program.

Nakdimen regularly appeared as a panel commentator on the Kentucky Educational Television's show Comment on Kentucky from its inception in 1974 until his retirement.

Nakdimen offered commentary from time to time during WAVE TV News newscasts both before and after his retirement. He ended each one by saying "...that's my opinion. I'm Dave Nakdimen".

=== Political debate panelist ===
Nakdimen was a panelist in the 1975 gubernatorial debate between Julian Carroll and Robert "Bob" Gable, the first such debate ever telecast statewide in Kentucky.

Nakdimen was a panelist in the October 8, 1984 Kentucky senatorial debate between Mitch McConnell and then Senator Walter "Dee" Huddleston broadcast statewide on the KET television network. The debate was held after the presidential debate between Ronald Reagan and Walter Mondale. Both debates took place at the Kentucky Center for the Arts in Louisville.

== News documentary producer ==
Nakdimen produced Open Housing, a 1966 color news documentary exploring the state of racial profiling in the Louisville housing market. Subjects interviewed included Louisville Mayor Kenneth Schmied, Msgr. Alfred Horrigan, Rev. A. D. King and others. The one hour WAVE TV documentary aired on December 26, 1966.

Nakdimen produced Downtown Louisville – What's The Big Idea?, a one-hour documentary that aired June 26, 1969. Nakdimen single-handedly produced the documentary over a period of 18 months. In a review by James Doussard, the Courier-Journal TV critic said "Dave (Nakdimen) has done one helluva good job". Written, filmed, edited and narrated by Nakdimen, the documentary earned praise for its deft use of humor to illustrate the challenges then facing the revitalization of Louisville. When Mayor Kenneth Schmied said on camera he didn't "really think Fourth Street looks that bad", Nakdimen had "the camera - mounted in a car - pan down one side and up the other, letting viewers judge for themselves". Nakdimen said of the Urban Renewal efforts in Louisville "...some suggest the program has created a sort of ragweed Ponderosa, particularly in the West Downtown, where acres of land are cleared but undeveloped".

After the documentary aired, WAVE TV's management said Nakdimen had been taken off regular news assignments, "turning him loose", becoming both the station's and the area's first full-time investigative reporter.

== Community activities ==
In 1984, Nakdimen appeared as a WGN Radio reporter in the then Louisville Museum of History and Science stage production of the transcripts of the Scopes "Monkey Trial". Nakdimen's character addressed the audience from behind a 1920s era radio microphone, leading the narrative through its ten scenes. The play was a part of the museum's "Jazz Age Beauties" exhibit, which examined American life in the 1920s.

== Reflecting on his career ==
When asked if he would repeat his thirty-six year career as a political reporter, Nakdimen said "I think so. I really enjoyed it. It was a lot of hard work, but it was a lot of fun too".

== After retirement ==
At his daughter's suggestion, Nakdimen started acting in the Mummers and Minstrels, an Anchorage, Kentucky-based volunteer performance group. He said "The first time I went on stage, it scared the hell out of me... there's no question that memorizing lines keeps you using your brain rather than sitting on the sofa and being a spud". By 2011, Nakdimen had appeared in six productions in six years.

== Community service ==
Nakdimen served on the University of Kentucky Journalism Alumni Association Officers and Directors board.

Nakidimen was a member of Louisville's Highland Baptist Church, where he served as a director of the church and as an honor deacon.

== Accolades ==
=== Upon retirement ===
Senator Mitch McConnell offered a tribute to Nakdimen on the US Senate floor on July 31, 1997, saying "I rise today to pay tribute to Mr. Dave Nakdimen, an outstanding newsman, who retired after a wonderful career in television news... in the world of television news it is extremely difficult to develop expertise in covering politics. Most of the political reporters that we deal with who are really talented... tend to be in print journalism. There is one real exception to that: Dave Nakdimen. Dave was the only expert political reporter I ever met in local television. He had a distinguished career. We will all miss him greatly. He is a man of great principle...".

In a letter to the editor of the Courier-Journal newspaper, attorney Harry A. Triplett said of Nakdimen "Dave Nakdimen's retirement as a news reporter for WAVE TV will cause a void in the profession. He had a reputation among those who frequent the Courthouse, City Hall and the Hall of Justice as a 'straight arrow'. He was honest, fair and objective and never an iconoclast. He is a splendid role model for those who are and aspire to be reporters".

=== Upon death ===
Hearing of Nakdimen's death in 2020, Senator McConnell said "Growing up listening to election results on Eastern Kentucky radio, Dave Nakdimen seemed almost destined to become a political reporter. Dave was one of the best local television journalists I've ever had the privilege to speak with, and he earned a hall of fame reputation from his viewers and his colleagues alike. Dave was a trusted voice broadcasting some of Louisville's biggest stories. He helped inform views on politics, housing and civil rights. Through it all, Dave brought integrity and principle to every aspect of his work, plus his signature dry wit".

== Honors ==
- 2011 – Silver Circle Award, National Academy of Television Arts & Sciences, "recognizing lasting contributions to the TV industry in the Ohio Valley Region"
- 1998 – Gavel Award, Louisville Bar Association, given at the Bench & Bar dinner for coverage of the courts, including the first televised trial in Kentucky
- 1998 – Kentucky Journalism Hall of Fame, Kentucky Associated Press Broadcast Group
- 1997 – Golden Mike Award, Louisville Chapter of the Society of Professional Journalists
- 1997 – Jefferson Cup, Jefferson County (Kentucky) Fiscal Court. Jefferson County Judge Executive Dave Armstrong called Nakdimen "the icon of local news", saying "the community has come to rely on the credibility of his reporting"
- 1987 – Outstanding Television Editorial, Louisville Metro Chapter of the Society of Professional Journalists, Sigma Delta Chi
- 1986 – Honored by the Jefferson County, Kentucky Fiscal Court for having covered the County courthouse for 25 consecutive years
- 1978 – Reporter of the Year, Louisville Bar Association for his ongoing interest in the legal system as reflected in his work
- 1967 – Gabriel Award, Catholic Broadcasters Association of America for Open Housing documentary
