= WLRS (AM) =

- New Albany, Indiana; United States
- Broadcast area: Louisville metropolitan area
- Frequency: 1570 kHz
- Branding: Kentuckiana's True Oldies

Programming
- Format: Oldies

Ownership
- Owner: New Albany Broadcasting Co., Inc.
- Sister stations: WLUE; WLRT

History
- First air date: June 15, 1949
- Former call signs: WLRP (1949–1959); WOWI (1959–1964); WNUW (1964–1966); WHEL (1966–1978); WOBS (1978–1992); WZCC (1992–1995); WXLN (1995–2003); WLBJ (2003–2005); WWSZ (2005–2008); WNDA (2008–2016)
- Call sign meaning: La Poderosa (previous branding)

Technical information
- Licensing authority: FCC
- Facility ID: 14553
- Class: B
- Power: 1,500 watts (day); 233 watts (night)
- Transmitter coordinates: 38°19′40.2″N 85°46′55.9″W
- Translator: 92.5 W223DK (Louisville, Kentucky)

Links
- Public license information: Public file; LMS
- Webcast: Listen live
- Website: www.kentuckianastrueoldieschannel.com

WLRS (1570 kHz) is a commercial AM radio station airing an oldies radio format. Licensed to New Albany, Indiana, it serves the Louisville metropolitan area. It is owned by New Albany Broadcasting Co., Inc.

By day, WLRS is powered at 1,500 watts. Because it is on a clear channel frequency, the station reduces power to 233 watts at night, to avoid interference with other stations on 1570 AM. WLRS's non-directional antenna and transmitter is on Diamond Place at Potters Lane in Clarksville, Indiana.

== History ==
The station signed on the air on June 15, 1949, with the call letters WLRP. It went through multiple format changes and call signs during its history. This station is where former NPR and SiriusXM host Bob Edwards began his broadcast career in 1968.

In 2008, it became WNDA. On September 26, 2011, WNDA changed its format to talk radio, branded "NewsTalk 1570".

On May 25, 2015, WNDA flipped its format to Spanish contemporary hits, branded "La Poderosa" ("The Powerful One" in Spanish). On June 3, 2016, WNDA changed its call letters to WLRS.

In July 2024, WLRS came under the control of Thomas Hoyt, who began simulcasting his Pure Radio Christian preaching format on the station, also heard on an FM 92.3 translator in Louisville, Kentucky. On October 1, 2024, WLRS broke off from the Pure Radio simulcast and began stunting with Christmas music. The "92.5 Days of Christmas" format would run through the holiday season (thus technically marking the first format flip of the 2024 season); at the time, the station announced that a new Latino Radio Service (a backronym of its existing call sign) would launch on the frequency in January 2025. When the Christmas stunting ended on December 31, 2024, WLRS instead launched an oldies format, branded as "Kentuckiana's True Oldies".
