= WLOU =

- Louisville, Kentucky; United States
- Broadcast area: Louisville metropolitan area
- Frequency: 1350 kHz
- Branding: 104.7 Jamz

Programming
- Format: Urban adult contemporary
- Affiliations: Compass Media Networks

Ownership
- Owner: Louisville Black Media; (Louisville Black Media LLC)
- Sister stations: WLLV

History
- First air date: November 19, 1948
- Call sign meaning: Louisville

Technical information
- Licensing authority: FCC
- Facility ID: 31883
- Class: B
- Power: 2,200 watts (day); 500 watts (night)
- Transmitter coordinates: 38°13′52.3″N 85°49′21.9″W
- Translator: 104.7 W284AD (New Albany, Indiana)
- Repeater: 1600 WLUE (Eminence)

Links
- Public license information: Public file; LMS
- Webcast: Listen live
- Website: wlouonline.com

WLOU (1350 AM) is a commercial radio station licensed to Louisville, Kentucky, United States, airing an urban adult contemporary format for the Louisville metropolitan area. Owned by Louisville Black Media, the station has studios on West Muhammad Ali Boulevard, west of downtown and a transmitter sited on the city's westside near I-264.

WLOU programming is simulcast on WLUE in Eminence, Kentucky, and also heard over low-power FM translator W284AD on 104.7 MHz.

== History ==
=== Heritage ===
WLOU signed on the air on November 19, 1948. At first, it was a daytimer, required to go off the air at night. It had a general format in its first three years. But its owners made a bold move at that point.

WLOU is the heritage black station in Louisville, programming to that community continuously since October 21, 1951. It became a "Negro radio station," using a staff of black disc jockeys. The early conversion to rhythm & blues (R&B) music makes WLOU one of the first five full-time R&B stations in the United States. The station featured the popular R&B format for decades, with news and talk programs focused on civil rights. Despite being a stand-alone AM daytimer station, it was one of the nation's top-rated soul music-Black radio outlets of its day.

=== Power increase ===
On November 21, 1957, WLOU went from 1,000 watts to 5,000 watts daytime with a pre-sunrise power of 500 watts. Nighttime service of 500 watts directional began on March 8, 1984.

In the 1990s, most listeners to urban and urban adult formats switched to FM radio for their music. Two Louisville FM stations, 96.5 WGZB-FM and 101.3 WMJM, eclipsed WLOU's dominance in the black community, so WLOU decided to end its urban adult format. It flipped to urban gospel music on July 15, 1996, after a brief period of airing a black-oriented Christian talk and teaching format.

=== Changes in ownership ===
The station had been owned by Anchor Radio, LLC since 2011. In late 2011, Anchor Radio, LLC acquired two synchronous FM translators on 104.7 MHz: W284AD in New Albany, Indiana, and W284AM in Middletown, Kentucky. It began airing WLOU on 104.7 MHz as well as 1350 kHz, using the slogan "WLOU on FM." Occasionally, WLOU simulcast with sister station WLLV.

Effective March 15, 2020, Anchor Radio sold WLOU, WLLV, and W284AD to New Albany Broadcasting for $325,000. On August 7, 2020, WLOU changed its format from urban gospel to urban oldies. On May 21, 2023, WLOU changed again, going from urban oldies to urban adult contemporary. It uses its translator's dial position in its moniker, "104.7 Jamz".

=== Past personalities ===
Some of the classic R&B announcers at WLOU in the earlier years include William "Tobe" Howard, "Jockey Jack" Gibson, Cliff Butler, William Summers, III (who later became President & Managing Partner of WLOU and then-sister WSTM-FM in the 1970s), Larry Dean, Otis "Daddy Dee" Humphrey, Winston "Skip" Thompson, "Little David" Anderson, Betty "Louise Jefferson" Rowan, Jerry Tucker and James "Jim Dandy" Rucker.

Popular later announcers include Jim Williams, Neal O'Rea, Brenda "20th Century Fox" Banks, Tony Fields, Bill Price (currently WLOU/WLLV General Manager) and Ange Canessa, through the end of the Urban Contemporary/Hip-Hop Format on October 31, 1995.

== Awards ==
In January 2012, the station was recognized as the Medium Market Station of the Year at the 2012 Stellar Awards ceremony in Nashville, Tennessee.
