= WMYO-CD =

Television station in Louisville, Kentucky

- Louisville, Kentucky; United States
- Channels: Digital: 18 (UHF); Virtual: 24
- Branding: Laff 24 Louisville

Programming
- Affiliations: 24.1: Laff; for others, see § Subchannels

Ownership
- Owner: Aircom Media; (New Albany Broadcasting Co., Inc.)

History
- Founded: November 30, 1987
- First air date: March 1, 1996
- Former call signs: W62BM (1987–1994); W24BW (1994–2009); W24BW-D (2009–2010); WKYI-CD (2010–2017); WBKI-CD (2017–2018)
- Former affiliations: MuchUSA (late 1990s–2003); America One (2003–2010); This TV (2010–2017); Jewelry Television (secondary, 2010–2013)
- Call sign meaning: Warehoused calls from channel 58 license; formerly meant "MyNetworkTV Ohio Valley"

Technical information
- Licensing authority: FCC
- Facility ID: 25078
- Class: CD
- ERP: 15 kW
- HAAT: 197 m (646 ft)
- Transmitter coordinates: 38°21′55.2″N 85°50′24.2″W

Links
- Public license information: Public file; LMS
- Website: aircommedia.com

WMYO-CD (channel 24) is a low-power, Class A television station in Louisville, Kentucky, United States, affiliated with several digital multicast networks. The station is owned by Aircom Media. WMYO-CD's studios are located on Potters Lane in Clarksville, Indiana, and its transmitter is located in the Louisville tower farm in Floyd County (northeast of Floyds Knobs).

== History ==
The station was founded on June 22, 1994, as W24BW (although it had a construction permit as W62BM) and first signed on the air on March 1, 1996. It was founded by Greater Louisville Communications, Inc. (owned by local businessmen Jerome Hutchinson Sr. and Jerome Hutchinson Jr.). From the late 1990s until 2003, the station carried music video programming from MuchUSA (now Fuse TV), the U.S. counterpart of the Canadian music video network MuchMusic. In 2003, the station switched its affiliation to America One, and began airing community and regional programming as well as sporting events. Channel 24's first chief engineer, Virgil Baldon Jr. (1994–1997), had the foresight to install a forward-compatible Acrodyne analog-to-digital convertible solid-state transmitter when W24BW began operations, over ten years ahead of the 2009 digital television transition. Baldon also oversaw the change of the transmitting antenna's directional main beam to 135 degrees true for maximum signal over the city of Louisville. Baldon was the first African-American engineer to oversee and successfully launch a TV station in the state of Kentucky.

In 2007, the Cascade Broadcasting Group, then-owners of Campbellsville-based WBKI-TV (channel 34), began operating W24BW under a local marketing agreement; the station moved its operations into WBKI's studio facility off Blankenbaker Parkway in Jeffersontown. The LMA also included a purchase option to buy the station. Cascade tried to rebrand channel 24 as the "Louisville Network" (or "LouNET"), and aired locally produced programs that were geared primarily towards the market's African American and Hispanic community. The station also began to brand under the fictional "WYCS" call letters (standing for "Your Community Station"), to avert confusion with other local translator stations which just transmitted completely automated content straight from their network's satellites.

Greater Louisville Broadcasting later sold channel 24 to New Albany Broadcasting Co., Inc. On November 10, 2009, the station changed its call sign to W24BW-D, upon beginning digital operation. On May 20, 2010, the station changed its call sign to WKYI-CD, denoting its status as a class A digital television station.

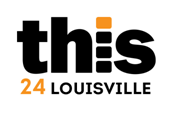
Logo for the station's former This TV affiliation

In January 2015, WKYI-CD took over the affiliation of This TV on 24.2 in place of WAVE, which was required by a company-wide agreement to offer the new male-focused subchannel Grit instead. This programming is mainly carried in the mornings, prime time and overnights on the station rather than the full 24/7 service.

The station changed its call sign to WBKI-CD on December 27, 2017, and to WMYO-CD on February 12, 2018.

== Technical information ==
=== Subchannels ===
The station's signal is multiplexed:

Subchannels of WMYO-CD
Subchannel	Res.	Short name	Programming
24.1	480i	Laff	Laff (4:3)
24.2	480i	DEFY	WISH-TV news programming / Defy
24.3	480i	ShopLC	Shop LC (4:3)
24.4	480i	WEST	WEST
24.5	480i	WMYO	Infomercials (4:3)
24.6	480i	JTV	Jewelry Television (4:3)
24.7	480i	TBN	TBN (4:3)
24.8	480i	1Outlaw	Outlaw
