= WBKI (TV) =

Television station in Salem, Indiana

ATSC 3.0 station
- Salem, Indiana; Louisville, Kentucky; United States
- City: Salem, Indiana
- Channels: Digital: 16 (UHF); Virtual: 58
- Branding: WBKI

Programming
- Affiliations: 58.1: The CW; for others, see § Subchannels

Ownership
- Owner: Gray Media; (Gray Television Licensee, LLC)
- Sister stations: WAVE, WDRB

History
- First air date: March 15, 1994
- Former call signs: WFTE (1994–2006); WMYO (2006–2018); WBKI-TV (February 12–19, 2018)
- Former channel numbers: Analog: 58 (UHF, 1994–2009); Digital: 51 (UHF, 2002–2019)
- Former affiliations: Independent (1994–1995); UPN (1995–2006); MyNetworkTV (2006–2018; 58.3, 2018–2026)
- Call sign meaning: "Warner Bros. in Kentucky and Indiana", from the original WBKI-TV on channel 34

Technical information
- Licensing authority: FCC
- Facility ID: 34167
- ERP: 860 kW
- HAAT: 390.4 m (1,281 ft)
- Transmitter coordinates: 38°21′1″N 85°50′57″W

Links
- Public license information: Public file; LMS

WBKI (channel 58) is a television station licensed to Salem, Indiana, United States, serving the Louisville, Kentucky, area as an affiliate of The CW. It is owned by Gray Media alongside NBC affiliate WAVE (channel 3) and dual Fox/MyNetworkTV affiliate WDRB (channel 41). The three stations share studios on South Floyd Street in downtown Louisville; WBKI's transmitter is located northeast of Floyds Knobs in northeastern Floyd County, Indiana.

Channel 58 began broadcasting as WFTE on March 15, 1994. It was owned by Salem farmer Tom Ledford and put on the air under a local marketing agreement with WDRB owner Block Communications, which provided programming and facilities. It was an independent station for its first year but affiliated with UPN when that network began in 1995. Block was allowed to purchase the station outright in 2001. UPN and The WB merged in 2006 to form The CW, but that network opted to affiliate with WBKI-TV (channel 34), and WFTE instead became a MyNetworkTV affiliate under a new call sign of WMYO. In 2012, WBKI-TV was sold, and the new owner entered into an agreement with Block to provide services. That station sold its spectrum in 2017, and its CW affiliation and call sign moved to channel 58 in stages between 2017 and 2018. WBKI is the broadcast home of Louisville City FC soccer.

== History ==
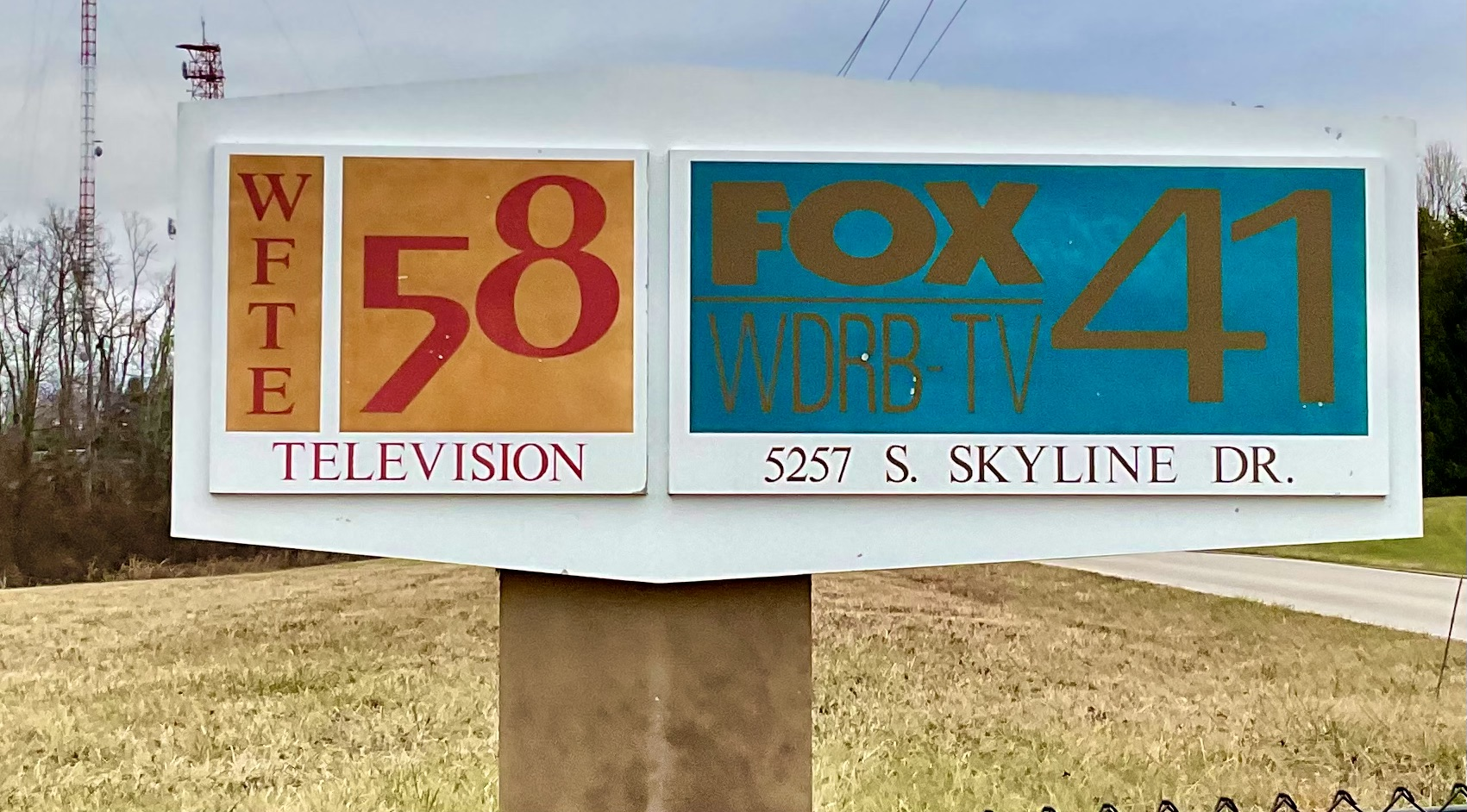
The original logo for channel 58 under its original WFTE calls is visible on the sign at the entrance of its shared transmitter with WDRB north of Louisville atop Floyds Knobs, Indiana; it was only used for one year before it took on UPN's affiliate design language upon that network's launch.

In 1987, Tom Ledford, a farmer from Salem, Indiana, read in his local newspaper that a television station allocation was available in his area. He applied and received a construction permit in September 1990. By late 1993, Ledford and consultant Bob Gordon had made progress in putting the station on the air. For programming, Ledford and Gordon entered into a local marketing agreement with WDRB (channel 41), Louisville's Fox affiliate, to program WFTE and use WDRB's tower at Floyds Knobs, Indiana. WDRB owned the rights to air the rights to air Cincinnati Reds baseball and Indiana Hoosiers men's basketball in Louisville, as well as other programs, but lacked enough time in its broadcast day to air them due to increased Fox network programming commitments. In addition, WFTE became the Louisville-market home of NYPD Blue, an ABC series that local affiliate WHAS-TV refused to carry.

WFTE began broadcasting on March 15, 1994. Shortly after broadcasting, channel 58 committed to UPN, which launched in January 1995. WDRB owner Block Communications acquired WFTE outright in 2001, creating the first television station duopoly in the Louisville market; this was allowed by the FCC even though there were fewer than eight unique commercial station owners because WFTE had only been put on the air as a result of the original local marketing agreement.

In 2006, UPN and The WB merged to form The CW. The WB affiliate in the market, WBKI-TV (channel 34), one of the highest-rated WB stations in the nation, was selected in early March as the CW affiliate. Later that month, WFTE signed a deal to affiliate with MyNetworkTV, a new network set up by Fox Television Stations to serve stations not chosen for The CW. On July 7, WFTE changed its call sign to WMYO in view of its new affiliation.

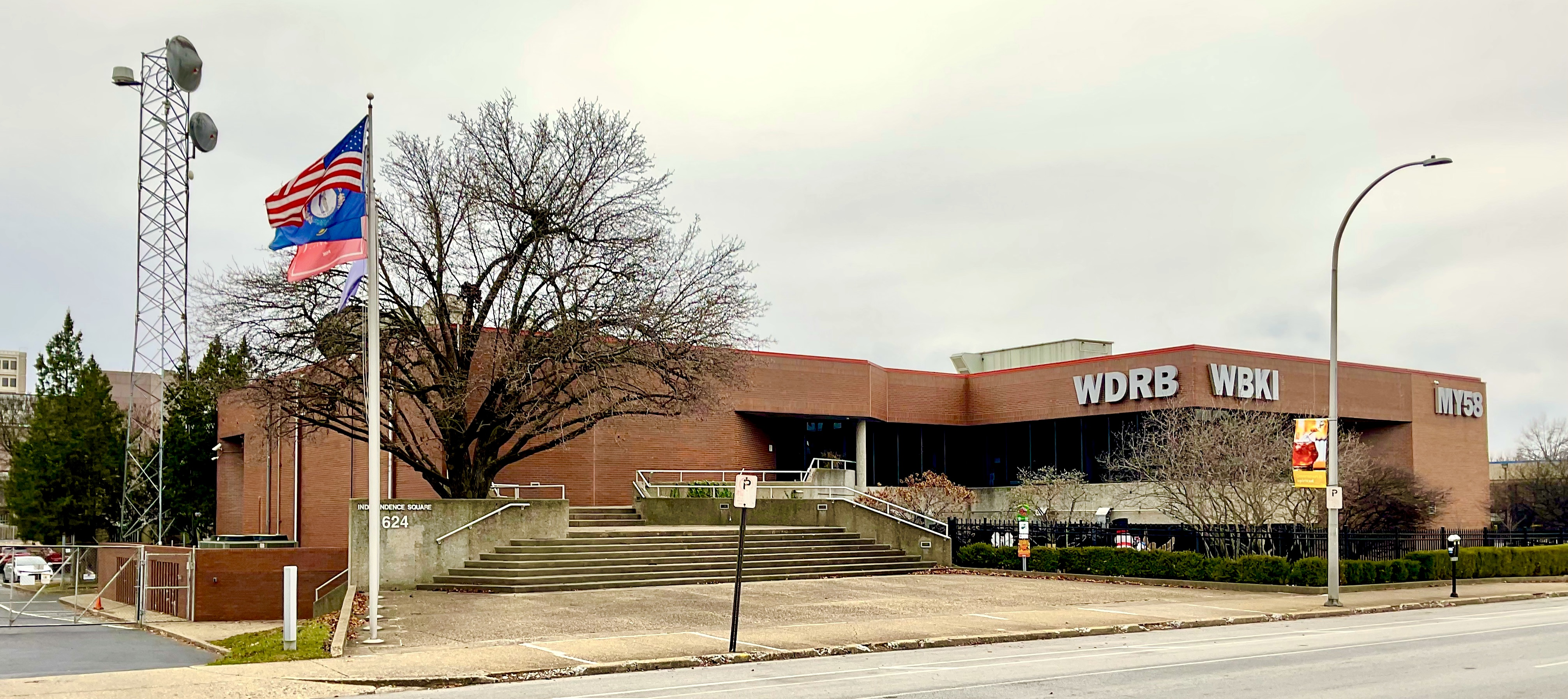
The former WDRB–WBKI studios on Muhammad Ali Blvd. in downtown Louisville. Channel 58 has been commonly operated with WDRB since it began broadcasting.

Block Communications entered into an operating partnership with WBKI-TV in 2012, after that station was purchased by Lynn Martin. In 2017, WBKI sold its broadcast spectrum in the broadcast incentive auction, and its programming moved to a subchannel of WMYO, which continued to use the WBKI name and major channel 34. On February 12, 2018, WMYO became WBKI and The CW moved to channel 58.1. This restored CW programming to DirecTV.

On August 1, 2025, Gray Media announced it would purchase Block's television stations, including WBKI and WDRB. The $80 million transaction would put the stations under common operation with NBC affiliate WAVE (channel 3). The sale was approved by the Federal Communications Commission (FCC) on May 6, 2026, including authority for Gray to own three TV station licenses in the Louisville market, and completed the same day.

== Local programming ==
As WMYO, the station began airing Louisville City FC soccer matches in 2017 as part of a three-station pact that also saw games air on WDRB and WBNA. The station continues to air Lou City matches when matches are not selected for broadcast on WDRB or exclusively on a national TV partner. WBKI is on the Indianapolis Colts preseason television network and airs the weekly Cincinnati Bengals program Bengals Weekly (WDRB is on that team's preseason network). WBKI also provides overflow capacity for WDRB local newscasts; in 2019, WBKI aired WDRB news 103 times on 70 separate days.

== Technical information ==
=== Subchannels ===
WBKI is Louisville's ATSC 3.0 (NextGen TV) host station. Its subchannels in ATSC 1.0 format are broadcast on subchannels of other participating stations, while it broadcasts itself and five other local stations in 3.0 format:

Subchannels provided by WBKI (ATSC 1.0)
Subchannel	Res.	Short name	Programming	ATSC 1.0 host
58.1	720p	WBKI-CW	The CW	WAVE
58.2	480i	COZI	Cozi TV	WAVE
58.3	720p	Ant.TV	Antenna TV	WDRB
58.4	480i	Movies!	Movies!	WLKY
58.5	480i	Mystery	Ion Mystery	WDRB
58.6	480i	Ion +	Ion Plus	WDRB

=== Analog-to-digital conversion ===
Channel 58, as WFTE, began operating a digital signal on channel 51 on October 1, 2002. It ended regular programming on its analog signal, over UHF channel 58, on June 12, 2009, the official digital television transition date. under federal mandate. The station's digital signal remained on its pre-transition UHF channel 51, using virtual channel 58. WBKI relocated its signal to channel 16 on October 18, 2019, as a result of the 2016 United States wireless spectrum auction.
