= WBKI-TV (1983–2017) =

Television station in Campbellsville, Kentucky (1983–2017)

- Campbellsville–Louisville, Kentucky; United States
- City: Campbellsville, Kentucky
- Channels: Digital: 19 (UHF); Virtual: 34

Programming
- Affiliations: Independent (1983–1992); Fox (1992–1997); The WB (1997–2006); The CW (2006–2017)

Ownership
- Owner: L.M. Communications, LLC
- Operator: Block Communications
- Sister stations: WDRB, WMYO

History
- First air date: July 27, 1983
- Last air date: October 25, 2017
- Former call signs: WGRB (1983–1999); WWWB (1999–2000)
- Former channel number: Analog: 34 (UHF, 1983–2009)
- Call sign meaning: "WB Kentuckiana"

Technical information
- Facility ID: 25173
- ERP: 1,000 kW
- HAAT: 341 m (1,119 ft)
- Transmitter coordinates: 37°31′51″N 85°26′45″W

WBKI-TV (channel 34) was a television station licensed to Campbellsville, Kentucky, United States, which served the Louisville area. Last owned by LM Communications, LLC, it was most recently affiliated with The CW. WBKI-TV was operated by Block Communications alongside Fox affiliate WDRB (channel 41) and Salem, Indiana–licensed MyNetworkTV affiliate WMYO (channel 58). WBKI-TV's transmitter was located in Raywick, Kentucky. In 2014, all of WBKI-TV's operations were consolidated at WDRB and WMYO's shared studio facility on West Muhammad Ali Boulevard (near U.S. Route 150) in downtown Louisville. Previously, WBKI-TV maintained separate studios at the Wright Tower on Dutchmans Lane in Louisville's Bowman section (along I-264/US 60/Henry Watterson Expressway), while the WDRB/WMYO facilities only housed WBKI-TV's master control and some internal operations.

Even though WBKI-TV broadcast a digital signal of its own, the station's broadcasting radius did not reach the northern portions of the Louisville market, particularly on the Indiana side. Therefore, the station was simulcast over WMYO's digital subchannels in order to reach the entire market. Following the sale of WBKI-TV's spectrum in the Federal Communications Commission (FCC)'s incentive auction, WBKI-TV ceased broadcasting on October 25, 2017 (with its license canceled on October 31); its channels are now broadcast solely through WMYO (which assumed the WBKI-TV call sign on February 12, 2018) on that station's license.

== History ==
=== Beginnings as an independent station ===
In 1980, local businessman William "Billy" Speer, doing business as Green River Broadcasting, applied for a broadcast license to launch a television station in the Campbellsville area in 1980; the construction permit was issued sometime in 1981, and the station became licensed on August 10, 1982, as WGRB. The station was scheduled to begin its first broadcast on February 1, 1983, but a delay in delivering the transmission antenna caused the station to delay its inaugural broadcast day; the antenna was delivered in early April. The station finally signed on the air on July 27, 1983. It originally operated as an independent station, serving mainly rural areas on the far southern fringe of the Louisville market (where Campbellsville is located), the southwestern portions of the Lexington market, and eastern portions of the recently formed Bowling Green market. The intention Speer had in launching the station was to give the area's inhabitants a "voice" in the media in an area where a local television station was not available; Louisville's VHF stations provided, at best, a Grade B signal to Campbellsville proper, but some television viewers in the area would have to rely mostly on rooftop antennas or cable television service to view network-affiliated stations in Louisville, Lexington or Bowling Green, and cable television did not yet have adequate penetration in the area.

The station's first studio and transmission facility was located on the Adair–Taylor County line along Kentucky Route 55 near Cane Valley. Without a network affiliation, syndicated programming played a huge role in the station's broadcast schedule, especially off-network reruns of older programs, but also offered a local newscast and a local wrestling program. The station filed for bankruptcy on August 8, 1984, only a little over a year after its launch.

=== Fox affiliation ===
In 1992, the station became the Fox affiliate for the southern section of the Louisville television market. Although Louisville's Fox affiliate, WDRB (channel 41), broadcast at the maximum five million watts of power, the station's signal was marginal at best in the southern part of the market. Additionally, cable television did not have much penetration in this portion of the market, leaving much of the area without any access to Fox programming until WGRB joined Fox. WGRB thus became one of the few known cases in which a separately owned station carried a network that already had an affiliate in the same market (similar to situations such as ABC affiliates WCVB-TV and WMUR-TV in the Boston–Manchester market or NBC affiliate WHIZ-TV in Zanesville, Ohio, about 60 miles (97 km) east of Columbus which has WCMH-TV for their NBC affiliate).

=== WB affiliation ===
WBKI-TV's logo as "Louisville's WB", used from 2002 to 2006.

WGRB dropped Fox in 1997 and joined The WB, bringing that fledgling network's programming to the southern portion of the market. However, the main WB affiliate for Louisville, WBNA (channel 21), was a conservative religious station, and its owner, Evangel World Prayer Center, frequently preempted most of the network's more adult-oriented programs. Frustrated with the preemptions, The WB made WGRB the network's exclusive Louisville outlet in 1998. At the same time, WGRB announced plans to build a new transmission tower that would be located closer to Louisville and upgrade its analog signal to a full five million watts of effective radiated power. The station activated this new, more powerful tower in Raywick, Kentucky, in 1999. Along with an upgraded transmitter, the station changed its call letters to WWWB on November 29, 1999, likely done in tribute to the now legendary and iconic "Dubba, Dubba, Dubba, Dubba, Dubba, WB!" jingle that the network utilized at the time in its image campaign.

In January 2000, operation of the station was acquired by Tucson, Arizona–based Cascade Broadcasting Group; that company would purchase the station outright in June of that year. Three months later, on September 19, the station changed its calls again to WBKI-TV, standing for "WB Kentuckiana". For most of the remainder of The WB's run, WBKI was one of the network's strongest affiliates.

=== CW affiliation ===
On January 24, 2006, the Warner Bros. unit of Time Warner and CBS Corporation announced that the two companies would shut down The WB and UPN, and combine the networks' respective programming to create a new "fifth" network called The CW. On March 1, the Cascade Broadcasting Group announced that channel 34 would become the market's CW affiliate, becoming one of the first outlets outside of the core CBS Television Stations and Tribune Broadcasting groups to announce an affiliation agreement with the new network. It came as no surprise that WBKI-TV was chosen as the CW affiliate, as that network's representatives were on record as preferring the "strongest" WB and UPN affiliates, and WBKI-TV had been one of the strongest WB affiliates in the country. Meanwhile, UPN affiliate WFTE (channel 58, later WMYO) announced it would join another newly created network, MyNetworkTV.

WBKI-TV became a charter CW affiliate when the network launched on September 18, 2006. It was decided that the station would continue using the WBKI-TV call letters to avoid audience confusion and maintain a reference to its Kentuckiana service area. In February 2007, Cascade Broadcasting took over the operations of W24BW (known unofficially as "WYCS") with an option to purchase the station outright.

=== Sale to Fusion Communications ===
Cascade filed for bankruptcy in 2008, resulting in WBKI-TV and W24BW being put up for sale at auction; the winning bid was submitted by Fusion Communications. The transaction was approved by the Federal Communications Commission (FCC); the deal was finalized in August 2009. Later that year, Fusion moved the station's operations from its longtime facility on Alliant Avenue in St. Matthews to the Wright Tower in downtown Louisville. In March 2012, Fusion defaulted on a loan from Valley Bank. Since Fusion had pledged WBKI-TV as collateral, Valley seized control of the station and auctioned off its assets to a local buyer on April 6, 2012.

=== LM Communications ownership ===
In June 2012, WBKI-TV was acquired by LM Communications, a company run by Lexington-based radio station owner Lynn Martin; LM immediately took over the station's operations through a local marketing agreement (LMA) prior to receiving FCC approval of the deal. Shortly afterward, on June 22, LM announced that it had entered into an LMA with Block Communications, owner of WDRB and WMYO, in which Block took over WBKI-TV's operations and began sharing select programming with channel 34. LM officially closed on the purchase on November 27. Although most of WBKI-TV's operations remained separate from WDRB and WMYO, certain operations between the station and its two sisters were merged. With the opening of an additional 11,000 square feet (1,022 m^{2}) of space at the latter duopoly's Muhammad Ali Boulevard studio facility on May 5, 2014, WBKI-TV reassigned up to 10 employees from the Wright Tower offices into the shared WDRB/WMYO facility.

=== Spectrum auction and closure ===
On April 13, 2017, the FCC announced that WBKI-TV had successfully sold its spectrum in the 2016 spectrum auction for $20.7 million without any channel sharing agreement. WBKI-TV ceased broadcasting October 25, 2017, and surrendered its license October 31, with its programming remaining available in the market via WMYO-DT3.

On February 12, 2018, Block Communications returned the WBKI-TV calls to the air as part of several shuffles which saw what was WMYO become the newly called WBKI-TV, and WBKI's CW schedule become the primary 58.1 channel in order to return carriage of The CW to satellite providers and AT&T U-verse, with WMYO's main MyNetworkTV schedule moving to WBKI-DT3 and that declining service having that same carriage removed as a result.

== Programming ==
=== General entertainment ===
The station cleared all programming from The WB and The CW from 1997 until its 2017 shutdown. Throughout its life on the air, the station's broadcast schedule encompassed a wide variety of syndicated programming outside of network programming. The station offered a variety of older and a few recent sitcoms, and a few first-run reality shows such as Blind Date and Elimidate. This station was also known in the market to air movies on weekend afternoons. In addition, WBKI-TV also carried programming from the Shop at Home Network during overnight hours until that network's 2008 shutdown. The station has also aired several locally produced shows as well.

=== Sports programming ===
WBKI-TV also broadcast a selection of sports programming for much of its life on the air. It was the flagship station for Ohio Valley Wrestling for a number of years. From 1992 into the early- and mid-2000s, the station broadcast Jefferson Pilot Sports coverage of select Southeastern Conference football and (beginning in 2001) basketball games, including those involving the Kentucky Wildcats; the SEC basketball package was shared with WAVE-TV during the 2000s. From 2002 to 2006, the station also aired preseason games of the National Football League's Tennessee Titans produced by WKRN-TV of Nashville. The station also had a history of airing select broadcasts of Notre Dame Fighting Irish football. It also shared some Big Ten Conference basketball game broadcasts with WFTE/WMYO. The station also produced a few local sports-related programs. The station was also affiliated with the ESPN Plus-operated Big 12 Network, featuring broadcasts of football and basketball games of the Big 12 Conference until that syndicated package was discontinued in 2014.

=== Newscasts ===
When the station launched in 1983, it produced a nightly newscast that lasted only a few months before shutting down its news operations and taking other steps to control expenses; the station filed for bankruptcy on August 8, 1984, only a year after its launch.

As a Fox affiliate, the station returned to producing newscasts in 1994, when they formed a partnership with Bowling Green's Fox affiliate WKNT (now WNKY) to form a two-station cooperative "network" after the two station began a jointly-broadcast newscast. This joint news operation even employed students from Western Kentucky University in varied aspects. This lasted until sometime around late 1996 or early 1997 due to low ratings, especially on WKNT's part as WBKO continued to dominate in the Bowling Green area's news ratings.

For several years in the mid- and late-2000s, WBKI-TV produced a local weekday morning entertainment and lifestyle show titled Louisville Live This Morning. An hour-long program that aired in a magazine-type format, the program aired weekdays at 10 a.m. In late 2005, WBKI-TV entered into a news share agreement with ABC affiliate WHAS-TV (channel 11) to produce a nightly prime time newscast for the station; the program, known as WHAS 11 News at 10:00 on WBKI, premiered on January 2, 2006. During the late 2000s, WBKI-TV also carried a weeknight 5:30 p.m. newscast titled The CW World Report, a half-hour program that focused on national and international stories; it was produced by Fusion Communications' sister operation Independent News Network and was produced out of INN's studios on Tremont Avenue in Davenport, Iowa. After Block Communications began operating WBKI-TV under the LMA with WDRB and WMYO, the station chose not to renew the news share agreement with WHAS. Instead, WDRB opted to launch its own newscast on channel 34 (as a result, WDRB became one of the few Fox stations to produce a newscast for another station in the same market). On September 17, 2012, WDRB began producing a half-hour weeknight 7 p.m. newscast, the WDRB Local Evening News at 7:00 on WBKI, which utilized the same anchor team as that seen on WDRB's 6:30 p.m. newscast. This resulted in a rare situation in which two competing stations produced newscasts for another station in the same market; WHAS-TV continued to produce the 10 p.m. newscast in the interim. The weekend editions of the prime time newscast were dropped after the September 30, 2012, broadcast; the weeknight editions followed suit one month later on October 26, leaving only the WDRB-produced early newscast.

== Technical information ==
=== Subchannels ===
The station's signal was multiplexed:

Subchannels of WBKI-TV
Subchannel	Res.	Short name	Programming
34.1	720	WBKI	The CW
34.2	480i	Movies!	Movies! (4:3)

=== History of the original WBKI-DT2 ===
In 2009, WBKI-TV added VasalloVision to a new second digital subchannel 34.2. Broadcasting of VasalloVision ended in August 2012. On September 1, 2014, the subchannel was reactivated to carry Weigel Broadcasting's Movies! network. After the station shut down, a new fourth subchannel of what was WMYO became the Movies! affiliate for the Louisville market.

=== Analog-to-digital conversion ===
WBKI-TV ended regular programming on its analog signal, over UHF channel 34, on February 17, 2009, the original date on which full-power television stations in the United States were to transition from analog to digital broadcasts under federal mandate. The station's digital signal remained on its pre-transition UHF channel 19, using virtual channel 34.

=== Spectrum sale and channel sharing ===
On April 13, 2017, the results of the FCC's 2016 spectrum auction were announced, with LM Communications successfully selling WBKI's UHF spectrum for over $20.65 million; LM indicated that the station would go off the air without entering into any channel sharing agreements. WBKI's channels were completely merged with those of WMYO. WBKI's principal signal at the Raywick transmitter was shut down on October 25, 2017.

== WBKI viewing area ==
=== Primary coverage area ===
WBKI-TV's transmitter was located 60 miles (97 km) south of downtown Louisville. This was as close as it could get to Louisville while providing a city-grade signal to its city of license, Campbellsville. Under FCC rules at the time, a broadcast station (television or radio)'s transmitter could be no farther than 15 miles (24 km) from its city of license. As a result, the station's main transmitter only provided "rimshot" coverage of Louisville itself despite its power and height. It was all but unviewable over-the-air in much of the Indiana side of the market, even in digital. To make up for this shortfall in coverage, WBKI-TV set up a Class A translator on channel 28 at the Kentuckiana tower farm northeast of Floyds Knobs shortly after becoming a WB affiliate.

WBKI-TV was the first Louisville-area station to exclusively transmit a digital signal. Before Cascade Broadcasting was forced into bankruptcy, the company asked for permission to move WBKI-TV's license to Bardstown, an outer suburb of Louisville. Presumably, this change would have allowed it to build a new full-power transmitter closer to Louisville and shut down the channel 28 repeater. The station subsequently chose to keep its license in Campbellsville, and upgrade WBKI-CA to digital as well. The repeater was not mandated by federal law to shut down its analog signal during the 2009 transition because it was not a full-power outlet. The FCC provided Class A and low-power stations a grace period of two years after the original digital transition deadline in order to switch to digital. In 2010, Fusion sold WBKI-CA to religious broadcaster Daystar, which now operates it as an owned-and-operated station of the network; however, it retained the WBKI-LP call letters (which it took after surrendering its Class A status in May 2013) until the network changed that station's call letters to WDYL-CD.

When Block entered into the LMA with WBKI-TV, WDRB general manager Bill Lamb promised to give WBKI-TV a significant technical overhaul. Part of that overhaul came on July 16, 2012, when WBKI-TV's programming began to be simulcast on WMYO's third digital subchannel (downconverted to 720p HD), finally giving the station full coverage in some form across the entire Louisville market over-the-air.

=== Out-of-market coverage ===
WBKI-TV claimed the largest coverage area of any television station in Kentucky due to the location of the station's transmitter near the geographical center of the state of Kentucky. The station's over-the-air signal provided at least secondary coverage (Grade B signal or better) from the Dale Hollow Reservoir area along the Tennessee state line to parts of Southern Indiana in areas along the Ohio River. Besides most of the Kentucky segment of the Louisville market, it served large portions of the Lexington and Bowling Green markets. Consequently, WBKI-TV maintained solid coverage on most cable systems in these areas for most of its tenure as an affiliate of The WB. For all intents and purposes, it was Lexington's de facto WB affiliate; the station even operated a "virtual channel" on primary cable systems in that area with a separate identification as "Lexington's WB17". This came after then-UPN affiliate WBLU-LP (channel 62, now defunct) dropped its WB affiliation in September 2003; that station aired WB programming off-schedule as a secondary affiliation for four years.

In addition, WBKI-TV was also the default over-the-air WB affiliate for at least the eastern half of the Bowling Green market area as that city's WB affiliate "WBWG" was a cable-only member of The WB 100+ Station Group. Indeed, Nielsen counted the station as part of both the Louisville and Bowling Green markets before the station relocated its transmitter to Raywick.

With the launch of The CW, under new affiliation terms inaugurated by the network, WBKI-TV was dropped from most cable providers in the Bowling Green and Lexington areas since that network launched onto subchannels of ABC affiliate WBKO (channel 13) and CBS affiliate WKYT-TV (channel 27). In spite of the existence of the subchannel-only affiliates in both markets, WBKI-TV could still be seen over-the-air in much of the western portion of the Lexington market, the eastern portion of the Bowling Green market, and on about 20 other cable systems in central and southern Kentucky. The station was also available on cable in portions of the Nashville market, including parts of far southern Kentucky (e.g. Cumberland, Clinton, and Monroe counties) as well as three counties (Clay, Macon, and Pickett) in Tennessee. This ended sometime around 2010 when Nashville's then-CW affiliate WNAB (channel 58) claimed market exclusivity in those areas.
