= WLUE (AM) =

Radio station in Eminence, Kentucky

Simulcasting WLOU Louisville
- Eminence, Kentucky; United States
- Broadcast area: Louisville metropolitan area
- Frequency: 1600 kHz
- Branding: 104.7 Jamz

Programming
- Format: Urban adult contemporary
- Affiliations: Compass Media Networks

Ownership
- Owner: New Albany Broadcasting Co., Inc.
- Sister stations: WLRS; WLRT

History
- First air date: June 1, 1966
- Former call signs: WSTL (1966–1986); WKXF (1986–1990); WXLN (1990–1991); WKXF (1991–2002); WTSZ (2002–2012); WLUE (2012–2013); WLRS (2013–2016); WLUE (2016–2017); WKYI (2017–2018); WBKI (2018); WKYI (2018–2022)
- Call sign meaning: Louisville (broadcast area, also similar to former sister station WLOU)

Technical information
- Licensing authority: FCC
- Facility ID: 64024
- Class: D
- Power: 320 watts days only
- Transmitter coordinates: 38°21′9.2″N 85°11′8.8″W
- Translator: 94.1 W231DB (La Grange)

Links
- Public license information: Public file; LMS
- Webcast: Listen live
- Website: www.wlouonline.com

WLUE (1600 AM) is a commercial radio station airing an urban adult contemporary format, with urban gospel music on Sunday mornings. Licensed to Eminence, Kentucky, it simulcasts 1350 WLOU in Louisville. They are owned by New Albany Broadcasting, with studios on West Muhammad Ali Boulevard, west of downtown. WLOU and WLUE target the African American community in the Louisville metropolitan area, which includes parts of Kentucky and Indiana. The Louisville radio market has approximately 200,000 African-American residents, about 16% of the population.

WLUE is a daytimer station. By day, WLUE is powered at 320 watts. To protect other stations on 1600 AM from interference, at night it must sign off the air. Programming is heard around the clock on FM translator W231DB in La Grange at 94.1 MHz.

== History ==
The first station to operate on 1600 kHz in Eminence was WSTL, which broadcast from 1956 until 1962. A new station, which reused the call sign WSTL, signed on the air on June 1, 1966. It changed its call sign to WKXF on September 17, 1986; to WXLN on August 1, 1990; back to WKXF on June 14, 1991; and to WTSZ on January 4, 2002.

On September 26, 2011, WTSZ changed its format to news/talk, branded as "NewsTalk 1570", simulcasting WNDA (1570 AM) in New Albany, Indiana. The call sign changed to WLUE on January 20, 2012, and to WLRS on February 6, 2013.

On May 25, 2015, WLRS changed its format to Spanish language contemporary, branded as "La Poderosa" (The Power). The call sign changed back to WLUE on June 3, 2016; to WKYI on December 15, 2017; to WBKI on January 19, 2018; and back to WKYI on February 8, 2018. On October 9, 2018, WKYI split from its simulcast with WLRS and switched to a southern rock and classic country format branded as "My 94.1".

On August 15, 2022, WKYI changed its format from classic country/southern rock to a simulcast of urban oldies-formatted WLOU (1350 AM) and returned to the WLUE call sign.
