= Fred Willard =

American actor and comedian (1933–2020)

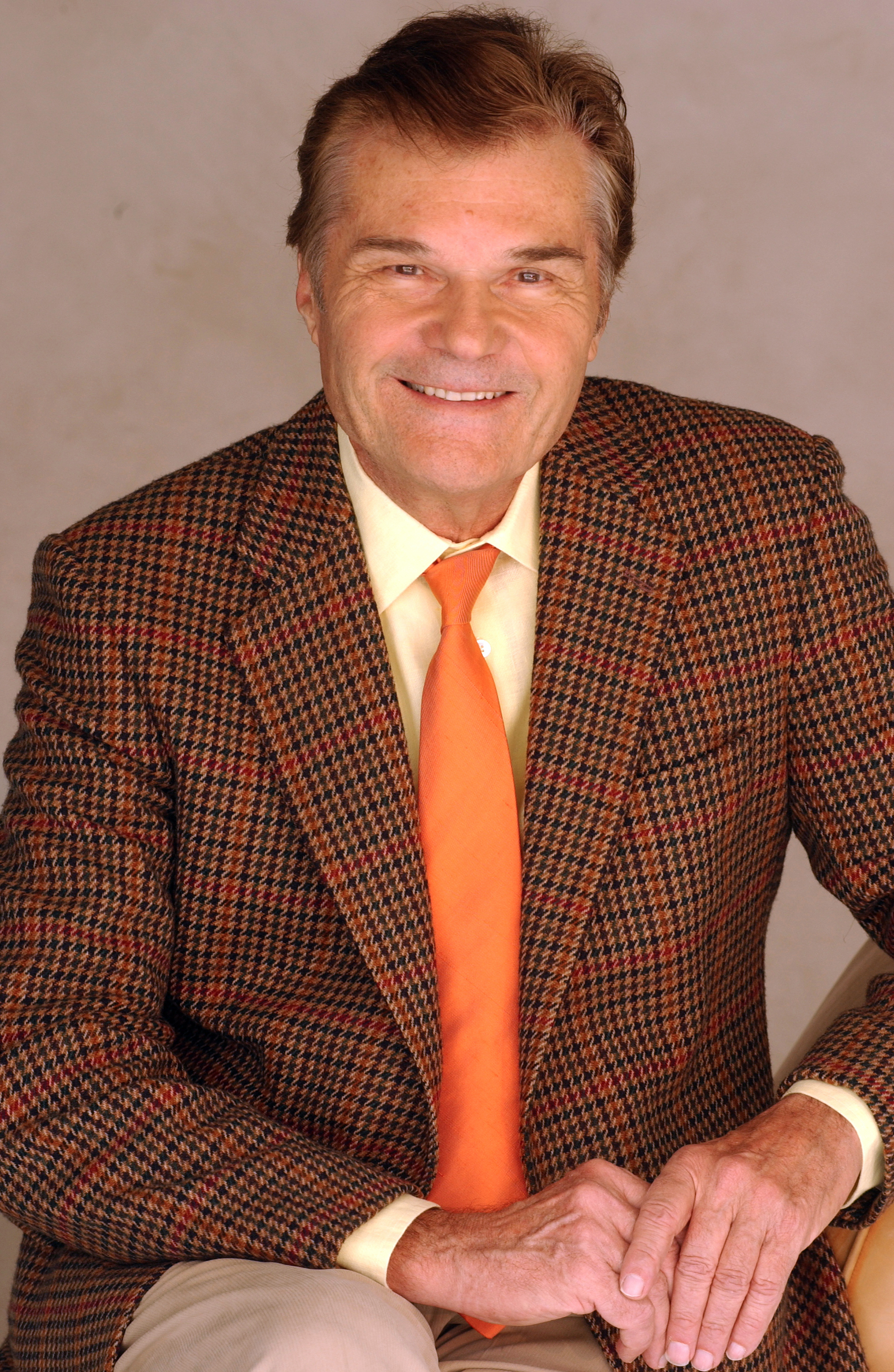
- Willard in 2008
- Born: Frederic Charles Willard; September 18, 1933; Cleveland, Ohio, U.S. (Note: In a 2012 interview with the Television Academy Foundation, Willard said he was born on September 18, 1939; that he was "pretty sure" it was in Cleveland; that his birth name was Frederic Charles Willard (without specifying his first name's spelling), and that his father had the same given name, but spelled differently. At the time of his death in 2020, Willard's daughter stated that he was 86, which also places his birth in 1933 or 1934 (1933 if born in September). Some sources cite Willard's birthplace as Shaker Heights, Ohio, and Willard himself stated that he grew up there.)
- Died: May 15, 2020 (aged 86); Los Angeles, California, U.S.
- Resting place: Forest Lawn Memorial Park in Los Angeles
- Education: Virginia Military Institute
- Occupations: Actor; comedian; writer
- Years active: 1957–2020
- Spouse: Mary Lovell (m. 1968; died 2018)
- Children: 1

Frederic Charles Willard (September 18, 1933 – May 15, 2020) was an American actor and comedian. He is best known for his work with Christopher Guest in his mockumentary films This Is Spinal Tap (1984), Waiting for Guffman (1996), Best in Show (2000), A Mighty Wind (2003), For Your Consideration (2006), and Mascots (2016). He also appeared in supporting roles in the comedy films Austin Powers: The Spy Who Shagged Me (1999), American Wedding (2003), and Anchorman: The Legend of Ron Burgundy (2004). On television, Willard received several Primetime Emmy Award nominations for his work on the sitcoms Everybody Loves Raymond and Modern Family.

== Early life ==
Frederic Charles Willard was born in Cleveland, Ohio, on September 18, 1933. Willard's mother, Ruth (née Weinman), was a housewife. Willard was raised in Shaker Heights, Ohio. In 1945, when Fred was 12 years old, his father, Frederick Charles Willard, died.

Willard graduated from the Kentucky Military Institute, a prep school, in 1951 and the Virginia Military Institute in 1955. He was stationed in West Germany while serving in the United States Army.

== Career ==
=== Early career ===
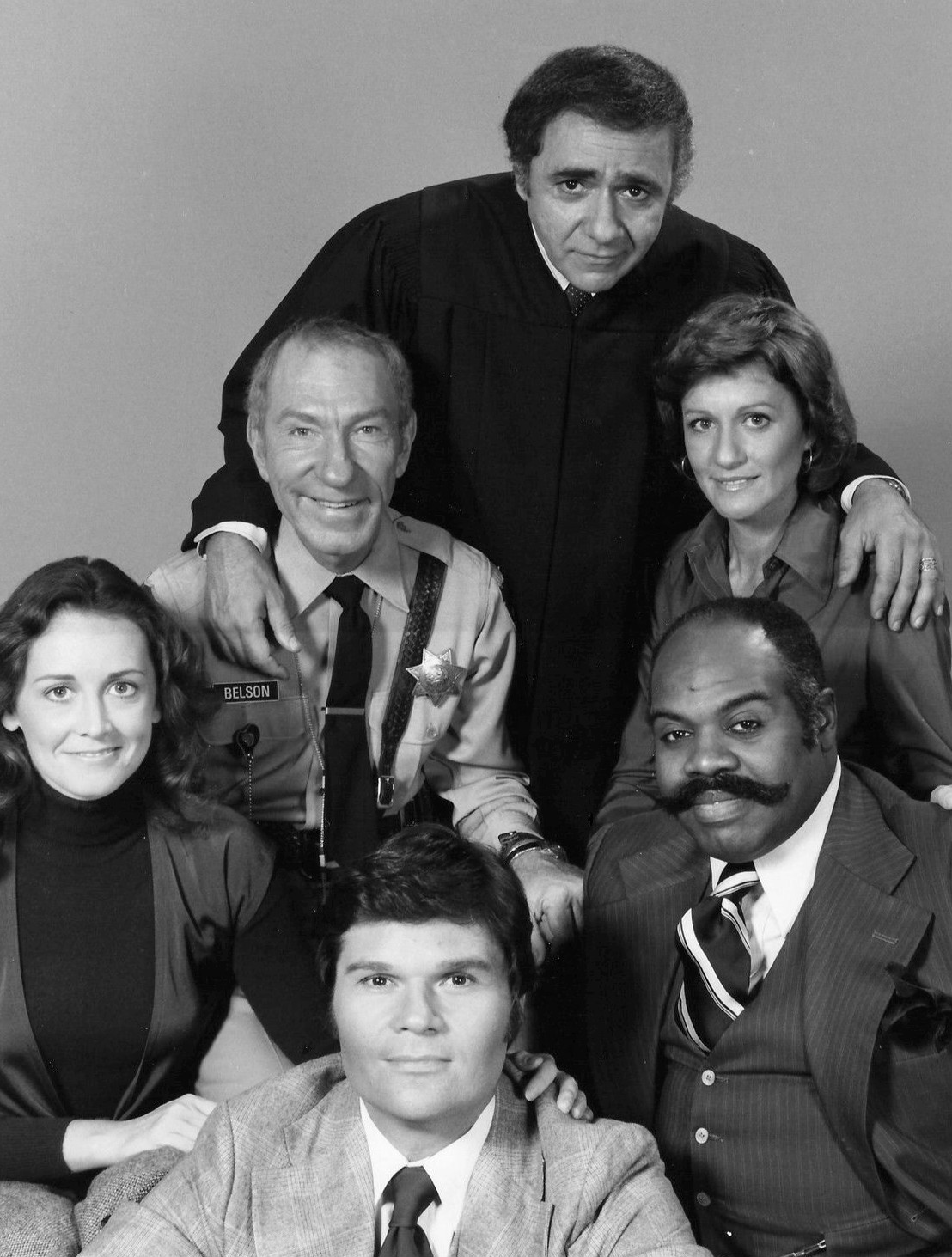
Willard (front center) with cast members of the short-lived comedy series Sirota's Court in 1976

Willard's stage career began when he moved to New York in the late 1950s. His initial work included a production of Desperate Hours at a local YMCA where he worked with future comedy partner Vic Grecco. They later performed as Willard & Grecco in the Greenwich Village area, found some success touring, and appeared on The Dean Martin Show, The Smothers Brothers Comedy Hour and The Tonight Show. They were offered roles in the television series Get Smart and The Carol Burnett Show, but the offers fell through due to poor management. The two parted ways in 1968.

Willard's film debut was in the 1967 exploitation film Teenage Mother. He later reported that the audience at one screening booed when his character interrupted an attempted sexual assault of the female lead.

One of Willard's earliest performing jobs was at The Second City, Chicago, where he shared the stage with Robert Klein and David Steinberg. He was a founding member of the improvisational comedy group Ace Trucking Company, whose other members included Michael Mislove and Bill Saluga. They performed sketches on The Tonight Show Starring Johnny Carson over 50 times, and appeared regularly on This is Tom Jones.

=== Rise to prominence ===
In 1977–78, Willard achieved wider fame as Barth Gimble's (Martin Mull) obtuse sidekick and announcer Jerry Hubbard on the Mary Hartman, Mary Hartman spinoffs, Fernwood 2 Night and America 2-Night, which parodied television talk shows of the day. He hosted Saturday Night Live in 1978 (with musical guests Devo). He was an original cast member of the popular NBC series Real People in 1979, then again from 1981 to 1983. His early guest-starring roles included The Bob Newhart Show, Laverne & Shirley, Mama's Family, Trapper John, M.D., and Fame.

Willard appeared in several Christopher Guest films, such as This Is Spinal Tap (1984), where he played a lieutenant on the military base where Spinal Tap perform; Waiting for Guffman (1996), playing Ron Albertson, a travel agent who performs in amateur stage productions with his wife; Best in Show (2000), where he played Buck Laughlin, a dog show commentator with an unending stream of bad jokes and off-color comments; A Mighty Wind (2003), in which he played Mike LaFontaine (known for his catchphrase "Eh—whahappen'?"); For Your Consideration (2006) as an obnoxious entertainment television show anchor; and Mascots (2016) as Greg Gammons, Jr. For his performance in Waiting for Guffman, Willard received an American Comedy Award nomination and a Screen Actors Guild nomination for Funniest Supporting Actor. He received the Boston Film Critics Award, an American Comedy Award, a Sierra Award and a tribute from AFI for his portrayal of Buck Laughlin in Best in Show.

Willard hosted the talk show What's Hot, What's Not, which aired from 1985 to 1986 and earned him a Daytime Emmy Award nomination for Outstanding Talk Show Host. In 1985, he and Mull joined up again for the mockumentary The History of White People in America. In 1987, he played Mayor Deebs in the film Roxanne, starring Steve Martin, and Tom Osbourne in the Academy Award–winning short film Ray's Male Heterosexual Dance Hall. From 1987 to 1989 he starred as a bartender/straight-man in Sid and Marty Krofft's D.C. Follies, and was host to the Krofft puppets portraying political figures of the time.

In 1990, Willard hosted the cable TV show Access America on the Ha! Comedy Network. As part of that show, on September 21, 1990, he appeared in episode 7 of the cult public-access television show Decoupage with Summer Caprice.

In 1995, Willard reunited with his Fernwood co-star, Martin Mull, playing Scott, the romantic partner of Mull's character Leon Carp, on Roseanne. The couple married in the episode "December Bride", and Scott became a recurring character during the series' final two seasons. The following year, Willard guest-starred in three episodes of Sister, Sister, starring Tia and Tamera Mowry. Willard played Carl Mitushka, a teacher at Roosevelt High who often spoke popular teenage slang terms in order to sound cool to his students. He had a recurring role as Jamie's boss on Mad About You. He also guest-starred in episodes of The Golden Girls, Married... with Children, Dave's World, Family Matters, Murphy Brown, Friends, Step by Step, The Weird Al Show, Just Shoot Me!, and The Hughleys, among others. Willard voiced travel agent Wally Kogen in the 1999 episode "Sunday, Cruddy Sunday" for The Simpsons.

=== Sustained success ===
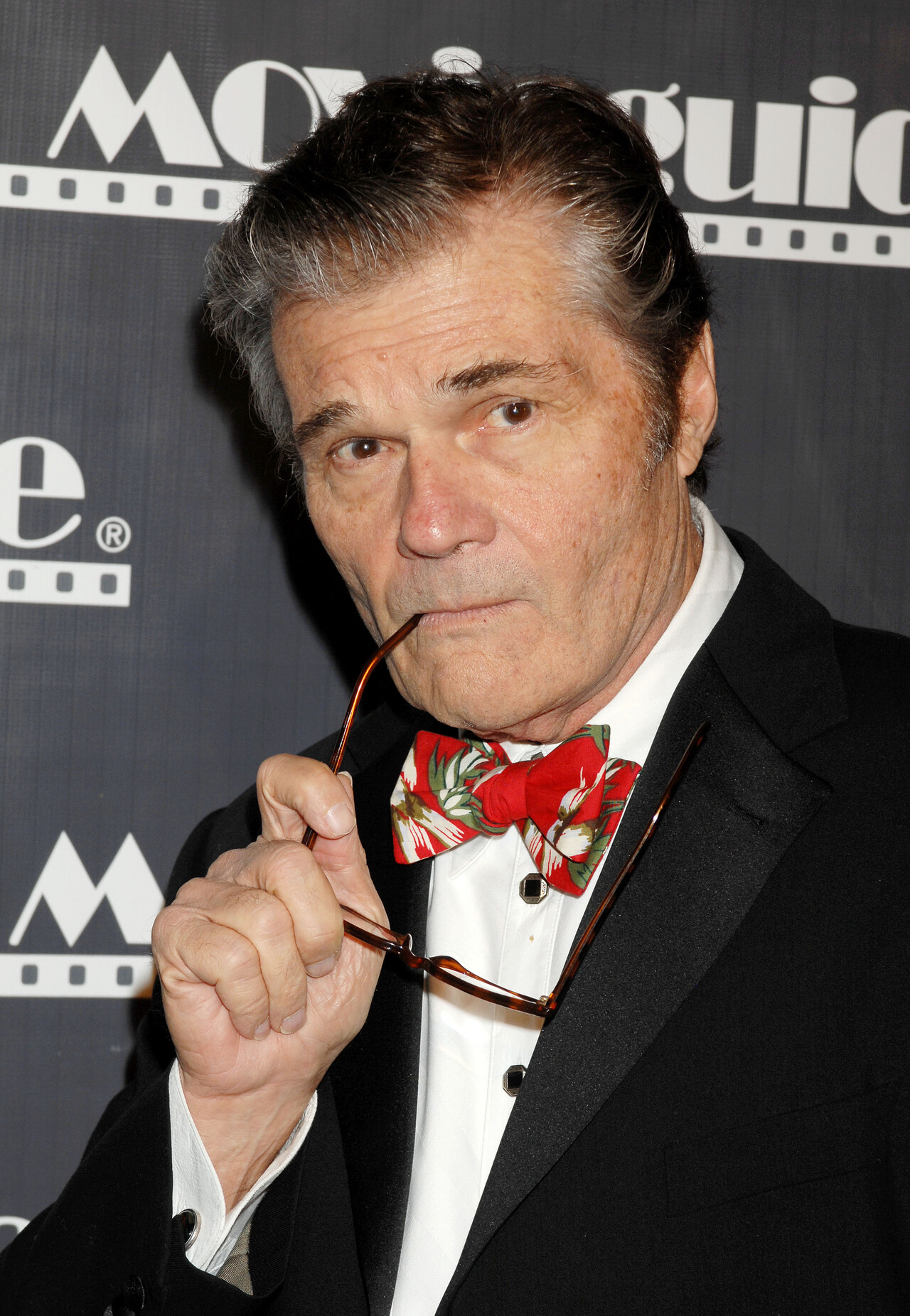
Willard in 2009

Willard continued to appear in films including the mission commander in Austin Powers: The Spy Who Shagged Me (1999), Basil St. Mosely in The Wedding Planner (2001), Harold Flaherty, Michelle Flaherty's dad in American Wedding (2003), and as KVWN news director Ed Harken in Anchorman: The Legend of Ron Burgundy (2004), and its sequel Anchorman 2: The Legend Continues (2013). From 2001 to 2002, he played the father of five children on the TV series Maybe It's Me.

Willard had a recurring role as Hank MacDougall on the later seasons of CBS's Everybody Loves Raymond, which brought him Emmy Award nominations in 2003, 2004, and 2005. He also hosted a VH1 documentary series, Totally Obsessed, about people obsessed with their hobbies. He appeared as Captain Ribmanman in Episode 21 of Channel Frederator, a podcast from Kansas. He provided the voices of nudist family dad Dave Campbell in Family Guy (first in the episode "From Method to Madness"), and of Officer Brown in King of the Hill, and appeared on That '70s Show. On The Tonight Show with Jay Leno, Willard appeared in 100 sketches as a government official, businessman, or other authority figure who was always drinking.

In 2005, Willard voiced Melvin in the animated film Chicken Little, and in 2006, he voiced Dad in the Academy Award nominated animated film Monster House. He appeared as a guest star on MADtv on at least three occasions between 2003 and 2007. He was the voice of a clueless companion to a lazy robot (played by Martin Mull) in the 2001 Dexter's Laboratory episode "Lab on the Run", and guest-starred on the Adult Swim cartoon Tom Goes to the Mayor. He acted in the Cartoon Network movie Re-Animated and played Vala Mal Doran's "father" in an episode of Stargate SG-1 in 2007. He appeared in two episodes of the Adult Swim program Tim and Eric Awesome Show, Great Job!. He also starred as the "Boogey Man" in an episode of The Grim Adventures of Billy & Mandy and reprised his role in a 2006 video game and the movie Billy & Mandy's Big Boogey Adventure. His final appearance as "Boogey" occurred in Billy & Mandy: Wrath of the Spider Queen. In 2007, he made a guest appearance on the children's TV series Come on Over. He also guest-starred on an episode of The Boondocks, providing the voice of "Joe Petto."

Willard was cast as a sportscaster in the television series Back to You, which premiered on the Fox Network on September 19, 2007. He played Shelby Forthright, the CEO of the Buy 'n' Large Corporation, in the first ever live-action speaking segments by Pixar in the animated film WALL-E (2008).

Willard completed a sold-out run of Fred Willard: Alone At Last!, advertised as a "one-man show" but actually featuring a cast of twelve, and received Los Angeles Artistic Director Awards for Best Comedy and Best Production. Willard had several stage roles to his credit, including Off-Broadway performances in Little Murders, directed by Alan Arkin, and Arf, directed by Richard Benjamin. His regional roles include Call Me Madam in Chicago and the musicals Promises, Promises, with Jason Alexander, and Anything Goes with Rachel York, both in Los Angeles. He starred in Wendy Wasserstein's Isn't It Romantic and off Broadway in Elvis and Juliet.

On October 5, 2008, he hosted the Nickelodeon Fido Awards.

Willard played Frank Dunphy, father of Phil (Ty Burrell), in several episodes of the ABC sitcom Modern Family. For his performance, he was nominated at the 62nd Primetime Emmy Awards for Outstanding Guest Actor in a Comedy Series and in the same category at the 72nd Primetime Creative Arts Emmy Awards, a posthumous nomination.

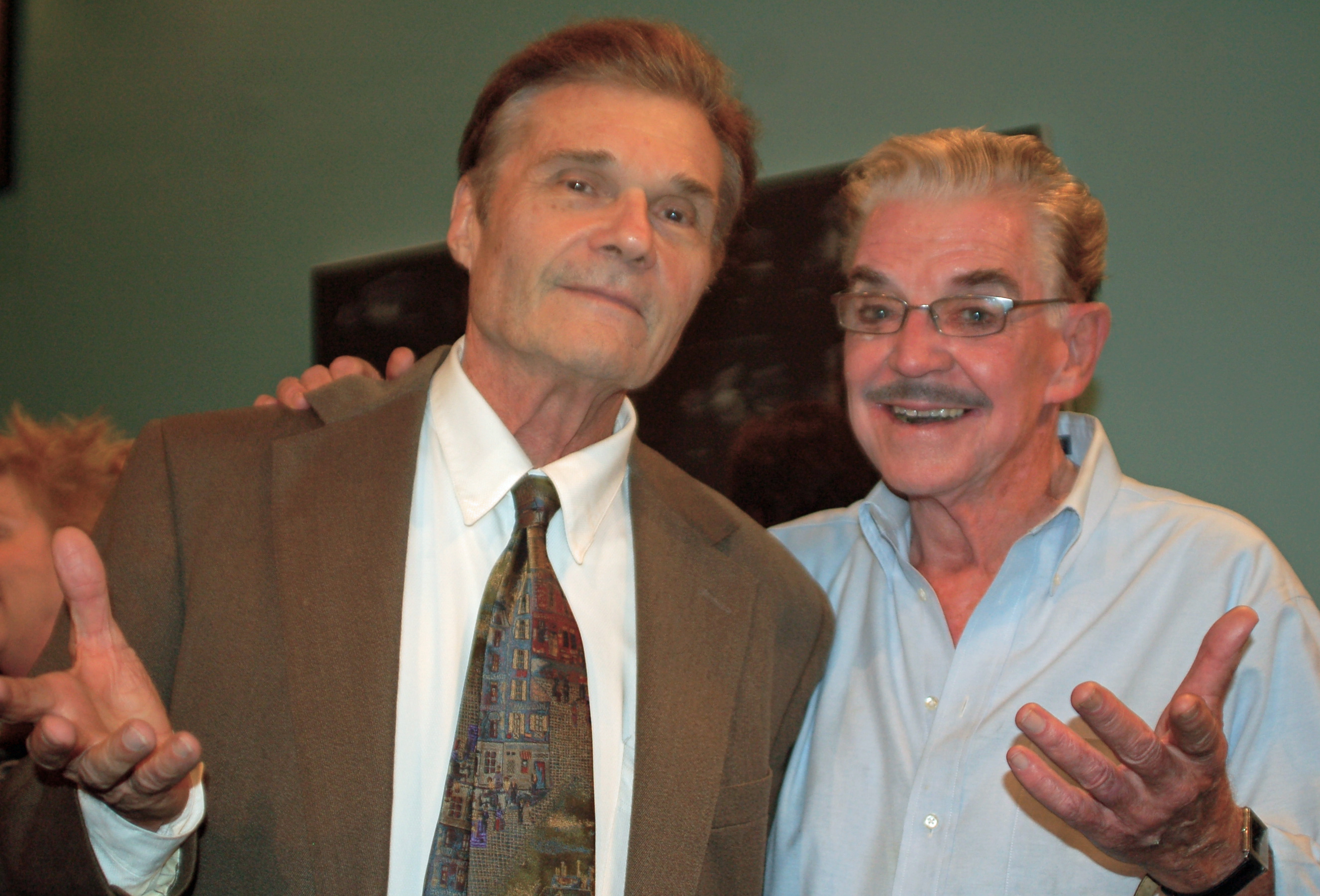
Willard (left) and Jack Betts, November 2010

On September 16, 2011, Willard was honored as a Pioneer in Comedy at Burbank International Film Festival. Also in 2011, Willard starred as "Santa Jack," a comical—and somewhat pervy—owner of a local Christmas carnival in episode 12 of the final season of The Closer.

In 2012, Willard played Al Kaiser in Rob Reiner's film The Magic of Belle Isle. In 2013, he starred in The Bird Men (originally called The Birder) alongside Tom Cavanagh, a film centered around a mild-mannered birder who seeks revenge on a younger rival, after losing the highly coveted Head of Ornithology position at the National Park. In 2014, he voiced Secretary of the Interior in the animated film Planes: Fire & Rescue.

Pacific Pioneer Broadcasters presented Willard with the Art Gilmore Career Achievement Award at their celebrity luncheon on June 19, 2015.

On August 10, 2018, Willard made a special guest appearance on Jimmy Kimmel Live!, reprising his role from a 1970s television pilot for an unmade series called Space Force, in light of President Donald Trump's announcement that he will create a space force for the United States military. Following the sketch, Willard made guest appearances on the show on a frequent basis, often portraying comedic, misguided characters parodying current news topics which Jimmy would interview "live via satellite". The characters included the ghosts of Fred Trump and George Washington, a Trump-supporting Santa Claus, and Supreme Court Justice Ruth Bader Ginsburg.

On October 23, 2019, it was announced that Willard was cast as Fred Naird in the 2020 Netflix comedy series, Space Force. This was Willard's final acting role, with the series being released two weeks after his death.

Willard's final voice-acting performance was in the 2017 Disney animated cartoon Mickey and the Roadster Racers as the character Mr. Doozy.

Willard's final role was in the 2021 television film Captain Daddy, where he played the role of Daddy, it was released in the summer a year after his death.

== Personal life and death ==
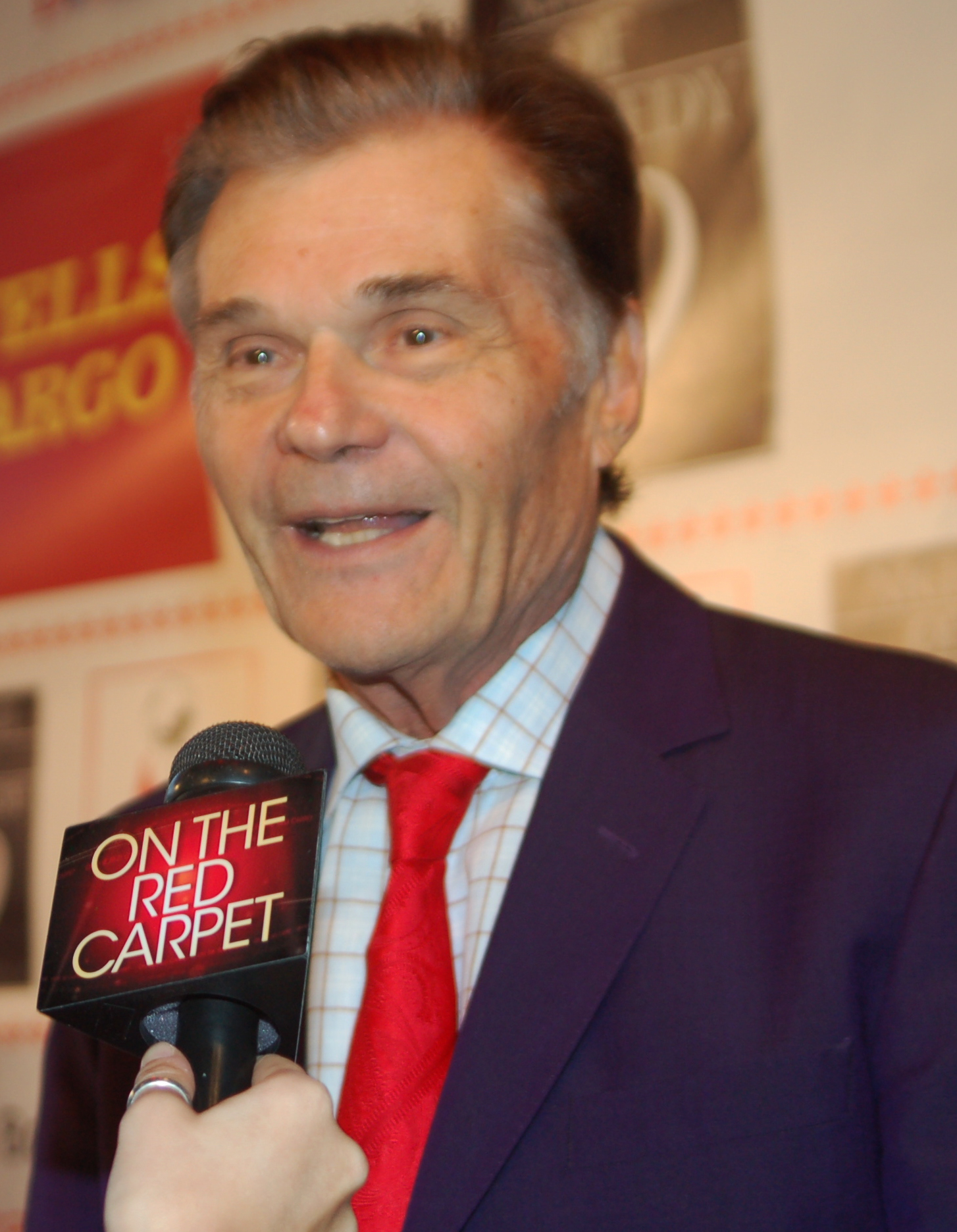
Willard at the Night of Comedy 9 benefit to support the Children Affected by AIDS Foundation (CAAF) in Beverly Hills, California, in May 2011

=== Marriage and family ===
In 1968, Willard married Mary Lovell (1947–2018). They had a daughter and a grandson.

=== Legal issues ===
On July 18, 2012, Willard was arrested on suspicion of engaging in masturbation at the Tiki Adult Theater on Santa Monica Boulevard and was brought to the Los Angeles Police Department's Hollywood Station. However, there was no proof of any misconduct and no charges were filed. Despite the outcomes, PBS fired Willard from Market Warriors immediately following his arrest, and Mark L. Walberg replaced him on the show. In an appearance on Late Night with Jimmy Fallon shortly thereafter, Willard stated that the incident was "very painful" and "very embarrassing," but that he "did nothing wrong." Willard was subsequently required to take a sex education diversion program.

=== Death ===
Willard died at his home in Los Angeles on May 15, 2020, at age 86, according to his daughter and his representative. His cause of death was reported as cardiac arrest, with coronary artery disease and myelodysplastic syndrome as contributing factors. Jamie Lee Curtis and her husband Christopher Guest, who frequently worked with Willard, were the first to reveal the news of his death. Willard is buried at Forest Lawn Memorial Park in Hollywood Hills.

== Filmography ==
=== Film ===
Year	Title	Role	Notes
1967	Teenage Mother	Coach	
1969	Model Shop	Gas Station Attendant	Uncredited
1970	Jenny	Executive	
1971	Dynamite Chicken	Self – Ace Trucking Co.	
1973	The Harrad Experiment	Ace Trucking Company employee	Uncredited
1974	Harrad Summer	Ace Trucking Company employee	Uncredited
1975	Hustle	Interrogator	
1976	Chesty Anderson, USN	Peter Linden	
1976	Silver Streak	Jerry Jarvis	
1977	Fun with Dick and Jane	Bob	
1977	Cracking Up	Various	
1979	Americathon	Vincent Vanderhoff	
1980	How to Beat the High Co$t of Living	Robert	
1980	First Family	Presidential Assistant Feebleman	
1982	National Lampoon's Movie Madness	President Robert Fogerty	
1983	IMPS*	Dad	(segment "3-Mile Island People")
1984	This Is Spinal Tap	Lt. Bob Hookstratten	
1985	Moving Violations	Terrence 'Doc' Williams	
1987	Roxanne	Mayor Deebs	
1987	Ray's Male Heterosexual Dance Hall	Tom Osborne	Short
1988	Portrait of a White Marriage	Hal Harrison	
1991	High Strung	Insurance Salesman	
1995	Prehysteria! 3	Thomas MacGregor	
1996	Waiting for Guffman	Ron Albertson	
1998	Permanent Midnight	Craig Ziffer	
1999	Elvis is Alive!	Interviewee	
1999	Can't Stop Dancing	Chester	
1999	Idle Hands	Dad Tobias	
1999	Austin Powers: The Spy Who Shagged Me	Mission Commander	
2000	Dropping Out	Paul Blanchard	
2000	Chump Change	Steve's Manager	
2000	Best in Show	Buck Laughlin	Boston Society of Film Critics Award for Best Supporting Actor; American Comedy Award for Funniest Supporting Actor in a Motion Picture; Nominated—National Society of Film Critics Award for Best Supporting Actor (2nd place); Nominated—New York Film Critics Circle Award for Best Supporting Actor (3rd place); Nominated—Las Vegas Society of Film Critics Award for Best Supporting Actor
2001	The Wedding Planner	Basil St. Mosely	
2001	Teddy Bears' Picnic	Senator Roger Dickey	
2001	How High	Philip Huntley	
2002	The Year That Trembled	Frank Woods	
2003	A Mighty Wind	Mike LaFontaine	
2003	American Wedding	Harold Flaherty	
2003	Nobody Knows Anything!	Mr. McClintock	
2004	Killer Diller	Ned	
2004	50 Ways to Leave Your Lover	Bucky Brandt	
2004	Harold & Kumar Go to White Castle	Dr. Willoughby	
2004	Anchorman: The Legend of Ron Burgundy	Edward "Ed" Harken	
2004	Wake Up, Ron Burgundy: The Lost Movie	Edward "Ed" Harken	Direct-to-video
2004	The Nutcracker and the Mouse King	Bubble	Voice
2005	Chicken Little	Melvin	Voice
2005	Love Wrecked	Ben Taylor	
2006	Date Movie	Bernie Funkyerdoder	
2006	Church Ball	Bishop Linderman	
2006	Monster House	DJ's Dad	Voice
2006	Ira & Abby	Michael Willoughby	
2006	For Your Consideration	Chuck	
2007	I'll Believe You	Mr. Fratus	
2007	Epic Movie	Aslo	
2007	Fighting Words	Longfellow	
2007	I Could Never Be Your Woman	Marty	
2008	WALL-E	Shelby Forthright, BnL CEO	Live-action scenes
2008	Harold	Dr. Pratt	
2008	Forever Plaid	Himself	
2010	Scouts Honor	Game Master	
2010	Holyman Undercover	Richard	
2010	Youth in Revolt	Mr. Ferguson	
2010	Expecting Mary	Jerry Zee	
2011	Fred & Vinnie	Movie Star	
2011	Scooby-Doo! Legend of the Phantosaur	Mr. Hubley	Voice
2012	The Magic of Belle Isle	Al Kaiser	
2013	Max Rose	Jim Clark	
2013	Dealin' with Idiots	Marty	
2013	The Bird Men	Park President	Originally called The Birder
2013	Anchorman 2: The Legend Continues	Edward "Ed" Harken	
2014	The Yank	Peter Murphy	
2014	Planes: Fire & Rescue	Secretary of the Interior	Voice
2014	All Stars	John Carson	
2015	Russell Madness	TJ	
2015	The 1st Annual Carney Awards	Self – Host	
2015	Bachelors	Uncle Ulysses	
2016	Fifty Shades of Black	Gary	
2016	Here Comes Rusty	Mak	
2016	Mascots	Greg Gammons	
2018	Blood Type	Helicopter Pilot Captain John	
2018	The Bobby Roberts Project	Ben Brinstein	
2020	Have a Good Trip: Adventures in Psychedelics	The 'Just Hang On!' Man	Final film role, released four days before his death

=== Television ===
Year	Title	Role	Notes
1966	Pistols 'n' Petticoats	Ben	Episode: "Quit Shootin' Folks"
1966	Hey, Landlord	Danny Subanski	Episode: "The Big Fumble"
1968	Get Smart	Lundy, Agent 198	Episode: "A Tale of Two Tails"
1968	Premiere	Bower	Episode: "Operation Greasepaint"
1970	Love, American Style	Douglas Wiley Shelley Noodleman	Segment: "Love and the Nuisance"
1973	The Burns and Schreiber Comedy Hour	Various	
1975	The Bob Newhart Show	John Emil Tobin	Episode: "Tobin's Back in Town"
1975	Karen	Ritter	Episode: "Whistle Blowing"
1976	Laverne & Shirley	Charles	Episode: "Dog Day Blind Dates"
1976	How to Break Up a Happy Divorce	Lance Colson	Television film
1976	Good Heavens	P.J.	Episode: "The Big Break"
1976–1977	Sirota's Court	H.R. 'Bud' Nugent	13 episodes
1977	Forever Fernwood	Jerry Hubbard	
1977	Fernwood 2 Night	Jerry Hubbard	65 episodes
1977	Escape from Bogen County	Pearson	Television film
1977	We've Got Each Other	Shop Owner	Episode: "The Collector"
1977	Tabitha	Mr. Macho	Episode: "The Arrival of Nancy"
1978	America 2-Night	Jerry Hubbard	65 episodes
1978	Saturday Night Live	Himself (host)	Episode: "Fred Willard/Devo"
1978	Space Force	Captain Thomas Woods	
1979	Flatbed Annie and Sweetiepie: Lady Truckers	Jack LaRosa	Television film
1979	Salem's Lot	Larry Crockett	2 episodes
1979	$weepstake$	Don	Season 1, episode 8
1979–1984	Real People	Himself	Voice
1980	The Wild Wacky Wonderful World of Winter	Various roles	Television special
1981	An Evening at the Improv	Himself	Season 1, Episode 2
1981	Pen 'n' Inc.	Ralph	Television film
1981–1986	The Love Boat	Various roles	3 episodes
1982	SCTV Network	Himself	Episode: "Indecent Exposure"
1982	Madame's Place	Himself	Episode: "The Prey of Madness"
1984	Mama's Family	Willie Potts	Episode: "Mama Buys a Car"
1984	Trapper John, M.D.	K.K. Laird	Episode: "Moonlighting Becomes You"
1985	The History of White People in America	Hal Harrison	Television film
1985	Getting the Last Laugh	ABC Special	Television film
1985	George Burns Comedy Week	Fred	Episode: "Home for Dinner"
1985	Lots of Luck	A.J. Foley	Television film
1985	Faerie Tale Theatre	Paul Link	Episode: "The Three Little Pigs"
1985–1986	What's Hot, What's Not	Himself (host)	Nominated—Daytime Emmy Award for Outstanding Talk Show Host
1986	Fast Times	Gus Pantelis	Episode: "Secret Romance"
1986	The History of White People in America: Volume II	Hal Harrison	Television film
1987	Fame	Casper Wintergreen	Episode: "Ian's Girl"
1987–1989	D.C. Follies	The Bartender	19 episodes
1988	Out of This World	Milton Wiler	Episode: "The Box Is Missing"
1988	My Secret Identity	Ray Bennett	Episode: "For Old Time's Sake"
1989	I, Martin Short, Goes Hollywood	Psychiatrist	Television special
1991	The Golden Girls	Bob	Episode: "Dateline:Miami"
1991	Nurses	Crazy Jim "Dr. Robinson"	Episode: "Friends and Lovers"
1992	Married... with Children	Stan Mandelson	Episode: "My Dinner with Anthrax"
1992	Dream On	Fenton Harley	Episode: "Up All Night"
1993	The Ben Stiller Show	Dad	Episode: "At the Beach"
1993	The Jackie Thomas Show	Hatfield Walker	2 episodes
1994	Sodbusters	Clarence Gentry	Television film
1994	Dave's World	Bud	Episode: "Just Kidding"
1994	Hart to Hart: Old Friends Never Die	Reginald Cobbles	Television film
1994–1996	Family Matters	Vice Principal Mallet	3 episodes
1995	The Mommies	John	Episode: "The Dating Pool"
1995	Murphy Brown	Dick	Episode: "Dick and Dottie"
1995–1997	Roseanne	Scott	8 episodes
1996	Back to Back	Loan Officer	Television film
1996	Friends	Mr. Lipson	Episode: "The One After the Super Bowl: Part 1"
1996	Clueless	Joe Pasadine	Episode: "City Beautification"
1996	Sister, Sister	Mr. Mitushka	3 episodes
1996	The Spooktacular New Adventures of Casper	Wally Winkle	Voice, 1 episode
1996–1997	Lois & Clark: The New Adventures of Superman	President Garner	3 episodes
1996	Saved by the Bell: The New Class	Mr. Huffington	Episode: "Stealing Screech"
1997	Muppets Tonight	Himself	Episode: "Coolio & Don Rickles"; cameo
1997	Diagnosis: Murder	Harry Fellows	Episode: "Must Kill TV"
1997	Step by Step	Bert Lambert	Episode: "Girls Just Wanna Have Fun"
1997	The Weird Al Show	Award Show Host	Episode: "The Competition"
1997	Breast Men	Talk Show Host	Television film; uncredited
1998	The Wayans Bros.	Dick Ferndale	Episode: "All in the Family Feud"
1998	Sabrina the Teenage Witch	Bobby Calzone	Episode: "Rumor Mill"
1998	Oh Baby	Dr. Foster	Episode: "The Vacation"
1998	Two Guys and a Girl	Frank Farber	Episode: "Two Guys, a Girl and a Vacation"
1998	City Guys	Mr. Brown	Episode: "A Noble Profession"
1998–1999	Mad About You	Henry Vincent	5 episodes
1998–1999	Hercules	Vic	Voice, 4 episodes
1999	The Pooch and the Pauper	President	Television film
1999	Pinky, Elmyra & the Brain	Glen Tarantella	Voice, episode: "Mr. Doctor"
1999	The Simpsons	Wally Kogan	Voice, episode: "Sunday, Cruddy Sunday"
1999	Just Shoot Me!	Larry	Episode: "Hostess to Murder"
1999	G vs E	Sam Kleinhauser	Episode: "Airplane"
1999	Love & Money	Dr. Fielding	Episode: "Make Room for Daddy"
1999–2000	Ladies Man	Larry Little	2 episodes
2000	Buzz Lightyear of Star Command	Pa	Voice, 3 episodes
2000	The Hughleys	Richard Jacobson Applegate	2 episodes
2000	Bette	Jasper Perkins	Episode: "Big Business"
2001	Ally McBeal	Dr. Harold Madison	2 episodes
2001	When Billie Beat Bobby	Howard Cosell	Television film
2001	Undeclared	Professor Duggan	2 episodes
2001	Girlfriends	Dr. Percy Bales	2 episodes
2001	Dexter's Laboratory	F.R.E.D.	Voice, episode: "Lab on the Run"
2001	Inside Schwartz	Dick Newton	Episode: "The Pinch Hitter"
2001	The Downer Channel	Mr. McVoid	Voice, episode: "Pilot"
2001	The Legend of Tarzan	Biruti (voice)	2 episodes
2001–2002	Maybe It's Me	Jerry Stage	22 episodes
2001–2008	King of the Hill	Officer Brown Ranger Bradley Reclining Hippie	Voice, 7 episodes
2002	Hey Arnold!	Sammy Redmond	Voice, episode: "Rich Guy"
2002	Family Guy	Dave Campbell	Voice, 2 episodes
2002–2004	Teamo Supremo	Mr. Paulson	Voice, 4 episodes
2003	National Lampoon's Christmas Vacation 2: Cousin Eddie's Island Adventure	Professor Doornitz	Television film
2003	That '70s Show	Charlie Miller	Episode: "The Battle of Evermore"
2003–2004	A Minute with Stan Hooper	Fred Hawkins	13 episodes
2003–2005	Everybody Loves Raymond	Hank MacDougall	13 episodes; Nominated—Primetime Emmy Award for Outstanding Guest Actor in a Comedy Series (2003, 2004, 2005)
2003–2005	Mad TV	Duke Flickman Gene St. John	2 episodes
2003–2007	Kim Possible	Jack Hench	Voice, 3 episodes
2004	The Drew Carey Show	Fred Tuttle	Episode: "Arrivederci, Italy"
2004	What the Blank	Himself	Host
2004–2005	Saturday Night Live	'Bear City' Narrator	Voice, Uncredited
2004–2005	The Batman	Speedway Announcer, Ross Darren	Voice, 2 episodes
2004–2005	Totally Obsessed	Himself	Host
2004–2007	The Grim Adventures of Billy & Mandy	Boogie Man	Voice, 2 episodes
2005	Tom Goes to the Mayor	Garry Friendly	Voice, episode: "Vice Mayor"
2005	Brandy & Mr. Whiskers	Dad Howler	Voice, episode: "The Howler Bunny"
2006	Campus Ladies	Doctor	Episode: "Spring Break"
2006	Re-Animated	Milt Appleday	Voice, television film
2006	Squirrel Boy	Stan the Exterminator	2 episodes
2006	Handy Manny	Mr. Dwayne Bouffant	Voice, episode: "Valentine's Day/Mr. Lopart Moves In"
2006	Come on Over	Dr. Fred Silliness	Episode: "Brain Freeze"
2006	My Gym Partner's a Monkey	Burt	Voice, 2 episodes
2007	Billy & Mandy's Big Boogey Adventure	Boogey Man	Voice, television film
2007	Stargate SG-1	Jacek	Episode: "Family Ties"
2007	Odd Job Jack	Norm	Episode: "Norm and the Magic Pencil"
2007	The Emperor's New School	Major Mudka	Voice, episode: "Mudka's Secret Recipe"
2007–2008	Back to You	Marsh McGinley	17 episodes
2007–2009	Tim and Eric Awesome Show, Great Job!	Tragg Mancierge	2 episodes
2007–2010	Betsy's Kindergarten Adventures	Bus Driver Bob	Voice, 17 episodes
2008	Pushing Daisies	The Great Hermann	Episode: "Oh Oh Oh It's Magic"
2008	Larry the Cable Guy's Star-Studded Christmas Extravaganza	Various roles	Television film
2008	Transformers Animated	Swindle	Voice, 2 episodes
2008	Worst Week	Paul	2 episodes
2008	The Boondocks	Mr. Joe Petto	Voice, episode: "The S Word"
2008–2009	Free Radio	Dale Knutson	2 episodes
2009	Everybody Hates Chris	Cop	Episode: "Everybody Hates the Car"
2009	Wizards of Waverly Place	Mr. Stuffleby	2 episodes
2009–2020	Modern Family	Frank Dunphy	13 episodes; Nominated—Primetime Emmy Award for Outstanding Guest Actor in a Comedy Series (2010, 2020)
2010	Castle	Hank McPhee	Episode: "The Late Shaft"
2010	Important Things with Demetri Martin	Scientist	Episode: "Money"
2010	Chuck	Craig Turner	Episode: "Chuck Versus the Role Models"
2010	Lilly's Light	Moylin	TV movie; Extended Cut released in 2021 (Posthumous release)
2010–2011	Glory Daze	Dr. Reynolds	2 episodes
2010–2011	Funny or Die Presents	Professor	3 episodes
2010–2014	Waves Sea	Donal Wilkins	
2011	G.I. Joe: Renegades	Mayor	Voice, episode: "Fire Fight"
2011	My Future Boyfriend	Bob	Television film
2011	The Closer	Santa Jack	Episode: "You Have The Right To Remain Jolly"
2011	Franklin & Bash	Wallace Clayton	Episode: "She Came Upstairs to Kill Me"
2011	Accidentally in Love	Dick Brocton	Television film
2011	Retired at 35	Peter Dixon	2 episodes
2011–2012	Easy to Assemble	Sigvard Thorsten	3 episodes
2012	Raising Hope	Mr. Swift	Episode: "Mrs. Smartypants"
2012	Trust Us with Your Life	Host	Season 1, 8 episodes
2012	The Life & Times of Tim	Judd	Voice, episode: "Action Packed Heist/Fall Foliage"
2012	Market Warriors	Host	Season 1
2012	Rob	George	Episode: "Dad Comes to Visit"
2012	Hot in Cleveland	Dr. Hill	Episode: "A Box Full of Puppies"
2012	I, Martin Short, Goes Home	Mason Macgillivray	Television special
2012	Breaking In	Marty Mann	Episode: "The Legend of Hurley's Gold"
2012	The Cleveland Show	Gary	Voice, episode: "Menace II Secret Society"
2013	Community	Alternate Pierce Hawthorne	Episode: "History 101"
2013	Family Tree	Mike Morton	3 episodes
2013	Drunk History	Deep Throat	Episode: "Washington D.C."
2013	Good Luck Charlie	Herb Pickler	Episode: "All Fall Down"
2014	Black Jesus	Mr. Jimmy Maxwell	Voice, episode: "Love Thy Enemy Part 2"
2014	The Birthday Boys	Archbishop	Episode: "Getting Preachy"
2014–2015	Review	Jack Walthall	4 episodes
2014–2015	The Bold and the Beautiful	John Forrester	7 episodes; Daytime Emmy Award for Outstanding Special Guest Performer in a Drama Series (Tied with Donna Mills and Ray Wise)
2014–2016	Comedy Bang! Bang!	Various roles	2 episodes
2014–2016	TripTank	Various roles	Voice, 5 episodes
2015	Hell's Kitchen	Himself (Blue Kitchen VIP guest)	Episode: "11 Chefs Compete"
2015	Celebrity Family Feud	Himself	Episode: Kevin McHale vs. Fred Willard
2015	Kevin from Work	Roger Trousdale	Episode: "Roommates from Work"
2016–2019	The Loud House	Albert (Pop-Pop) Reynolds	Voice, 7 episodes
2016	The $100,000 Pyramid	Himself (Celebrity Guest)	Episode: "Fred Willard vs. Yvette Nicole Brown"
2016	The Odd Couple	Fred Langford	2 episodes
2017	SuperMansion	Champston employee	Voice, episode: "School Me Once"
2017	New Girl	Beezus	Episode: "Five Stars for Beezus"
2017	Tim & Eric's Bedtime Stories	Dan	Episode: "The Demotion"
2017	9JKL	Dick	Episode: "It Happened One Night"
2017–2019	Milo Murphy's Law	Grandpa Murphy	Voice, 2 episodes
2017–2021	Mickey Mouse Mixed-Up Adventures	Mr. Doozy	Voice, 8 episodes (final performance, posthumously released)
2018	The 5th Quarter	Jerry Hymowitz	Episode: "Farewell"
2018	Corporate	Bill Hathaway	Episode: "The Long Meeting"
2018	Skylanders Academy	Announcer	Voice, episode: "Off to the Races"
2018–2019	Jimmy Kimmel Live!	Various roles	9 episodes
2019	I Think You Should Leave with Tim Robinson	New Joe	Episode: "It's the Cigars You Smoke That Are Gonna Give You Cancer"
2019	Historical Roasts	God	Episode: "Anne Frank"
2019	The Bachelorette	Himself; Guest Announcer	Episode: "Week 2"
2019	What Just Happened??! with Fred Savage	Himself	Episode: "Assistant"
2019	Tigtone	Crackers	Voice, episode: "Tigtone and the Wizard Hunt"
2020	The Bachelor	Himself; Guest Announcer	Episode: "Week 3"
2020	Russell Maniac	TJ	7 episodes
2020	Space Force	Fred Naird	3 episodes; posthumous release (final appearance)
2021	Captain Daddy	Daddy	TV movie; Posthumous release (Final role)

=== Video games ===
Year	Title	Voice role	Notes
2006	The Grim Adventures of Billy & Mandy	Boogey	
2007	Hot Brain	Professor Ed Warmer	
