= Temptation Island season 10 =

Season 10 of Temptation Island

Temptation Island
- Season 10
- Presented by: Mark L. Walberg
- No. of episodes: 9

Release
- Original network: Netflix
- Original release: April 10, 2026

Season chronology
- ← Previous; Season 9

The tenth season of Temptation Island premiered on April 10, 2026. This season is the second to be released on Netflix, after the series previously aired on Fox and USA. The season follows four couples who desire to have their relationship tested. The couples are separated from one another, in which they were required to commingle with a group of single members of the opposite sex whose purpose was to persuade the couples to have an affair.

== Season summary ==
#	Couple	Occupation	Hometown	# Years Dating	Status	Notes
1	Jack Mason	Entrepreneur		5 years	Split	Both Jack and Shyanne chose to leave the island alone.
1	Shyanne Blankenship	Entrepreneur		5 years	Split	Both Jack and Shyanne chose to leave the island alone.
2	Mikey Bivens	Live music event host		1.5 years	Split	Mikey decided to leave the island alone, while Sydney decided to leave the island with Xzavier.
2	Sydney McGregor	Aesthetician		1.5 years	Split	Mikey decided to leave the island alone, while Sydney decided to leave the island with Xzavier.
3	Cole Mueller	Real estate agent		2 years	Split	Cole wanted to leave with Scarlett, but Scarlett chose to leave alone.
3	Scarlett Bentley	Marketing agency owner		2 years	Split	Cole wanted to leave with Scarlett, but Scarlett chose to leave alone.
4	Kaylee Needham	Fashion		1 year	Dating	Kaylee and Summit decided to leave the island together.
4	Summit Wallace	Fitness coach		1 year	Dating	Kaylee and Summit decided to leave the island together.

== Participants ==
The tempters and temptresses were revealed on April 10, 2026.

=== The Tempters ===
Name	Age	Occupation
Bradley Ward	30	Bartender
Braeden Holliday	25	Sales associate
Clint Smitty	27	Model
Donny Aviles	28	Actor
Ethan McCormick	23	Acrobat
Kai Stone	29	CEO
Kris Hami	28	Personal trainer
Malik Quisenberry	28	Artist
Peter Cipriano	29	Consultant
Preston Viltx	26	Entrepreneur
Xzavier Odom	26	Product manager
Zach Guzman	25	Medical marketing

=== The Temptresses ===
Name	Age	Occupation
Carter Erin	23	Bartender
Christelle Isme	26	Property management
India Kelly	24	Consultant
Jesenia Sosa	28	Content creator
Julianne Herring	26	Model
Kennedi Cable	25	Flight attendant
Lexy Puhlick	29	Content creator
Lulu Williams	24	Flight attendant
Maya Allegra	24	Digital creator
Sindi Ceta	27	Bartender
Sydney Williams	25	Endodontic assistant
Tiffany O'Connor	28	Marketing director

== Episodes ==
"Temptation Island" season 10 Episodes
No. overall	No. in season	Title	Original release date
89	1	"Temptation's Knocking"	April 10, 2026
90	2	"Rip the Band-Aid Off"	April 10, 2026
91	3	"Catching Feelings"	April 10, 2026
92	4	"Is This Real Life?"	April 10, 2026
93	5	"Heated Rivalry"	April 10, 2026
94	6	"Message Received"	April 10, 2026
95	7	"Villa Swap"	April 10, 2026
96	8	"No Turning Back"	April 10, 2026
97	9	"The Final Bonfire"	April 10, 2026
