= Temptation Island season 9 =

Season 10 of Temptation Island

Temptation Island
- Season 9
- Presented by: Mark L. Walberg
- No. of episodes: 10

Release
- Original network: Netflix
- Original release: March 12, 2025

Season chronology
- Next → Season 10

The ninth season of Temptation Island premiered on March 12, 2025. Mark L. Walberg returned for his ninth season as host. This season is the first to be released on Netflix, after the series previously aired on Fox and USA. The season follows four couples who desire to have their relationship tested. The couples are separated from one another, in which they were required to commingle with a group of single members of the opposite sex whose purpose was to persuade the couples to have an affair.

== Season summary ==
#	Couples	Occupation	Hometown	# Years Dating	Status	Notes
1	Brion Whitley	Financial Advisor	Atlanta, GA	1 year	Split	They left the island together but later Shante decided to split from Brion after she witnessed him have a threesome on the island.
1	Shante Glover	Account Executive	Atlanta, GA	1 year	Split	They left the island together but later Shante decided to split from Brion after she witnessed him have a threesome on the island.
2	Tayler Bird	Health Education Specialist / Personal Trainer	Nashville, TN	2.5 years	Split	Tayler chose to leave the island alone, while Tyler decided to leave the island with Kay.
2	Tyler Breshears	Model	Nashville, TN	2.5 years	Split	Tayler chose to leave the island alone, while Tyler decided to leave the island with Kay.
3	Alexa Santamaria	Nurse	Atlanta, GA	3.5 years	Engaged	Alexa and Lino decided to leave the island together. Lino proposed to Alexa and she accepted.
3	Lino Troisi	Personal Trainer	Atlanta, GA	3.5 years	Engaged	Alexa and Lino decided to leave the island together. Lino proposed to Alexa and she accepted.
4	Ashley Moore	Tax Analyst	Florida, USA	1.5 years	Split	Ashley decided to leave the island with Danny, while Grant decided to leave the island alone.
4	Grant Larsen	Business Owner	Florida, USA	1.5 years	Split	Ashley decided to leave the island with Danny, while Grant decided to leave the island alone.

== Participants ==
The tempters and temptresses were revealed on March 19, 2025. Yamen Sanders previously appeared on season 1 of Love Island USA.

=== The Tempters ===
Name	Age	Occupation
Case Bruton	30	CEO
Chris Kotselidis	29	Fitness model
Cody Wright	31	Project manager
Dan Hunter	36	Tech sales
Danny Spongberg	23	Solar sales
Erik Thornally	28	Entrepreneur
Giovanni Troini	29	Digital marketing
Hashim Moore	30	Sales director
Logan Paulsen	23	Solar sales
Max Collier	30	Project manager
Quentin Lawrence	36	Fitness trainer
Yamen Sanders	30	Entrepreneur

=== The Temptresses ===
Name	Age	Occupation
Alex Zamora	26	Influencer
Amiah Brooks	24	Jeweler
Courtney Randolph	27	Model
Kay Carlson	26	Fitness influencer
Melissa Florez	26	Nightlife hospitality
Mia Jones	27	Dental assistant
Natalie Cruz	23	Sales
Nikki H.	26	Dermatology
Olivia Rae	30	Personal assistant
Olivia Sloan	24	Event planner
Reba Old	23	Digital marketing
Reilly Heizer	23	Model

=== Future appearances ===
In 2025, Olivia Rae, Cody Wright and Alex Zamora appeared on season three of Perfect Match.

In 2026, Yamen Sanders appeared on series three of Love Island: All Stars. Sanders also appeared on season four of Perfect Match with Natalie Cruz, Hashim Moore and Danny Spongburg.

== Episodes ==
"Temptation Island" season 9 Episodes
No. overall	No. in season	Title	Original release date
79	1	"Bring on the Temptation"	March 12, 2025
80	2	"Testing the Waters"	March 12, 2025
81	3	"Playing with Fire"	March 12, 2025
82	4	"Getting Steamy"	March 12, 2025
83	5	"Temptation Haven"	March 12, 2025
84	6	"Guessing Games"	March 12, 2025
85	7	"Mixed Messages"	March 12, 2025
86	8	"Trust the Process"	March 12, 2025
87	9	"Beginning of the End"	March 12, 2025
88	10	"The Final Bonfire"	March 12, 2025
