= Billiard room =

Room with one or more billiard tables

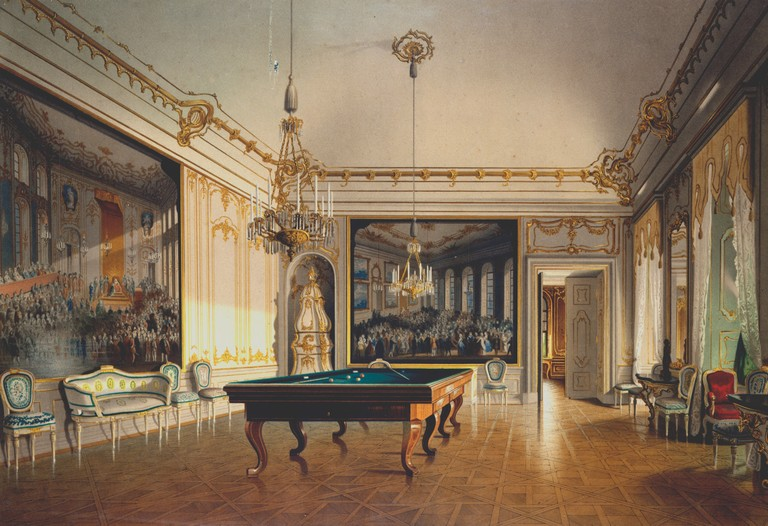
The billiard room at Schönbrunn Palace, c. 1855/1860, chromolithograph after a watercolour by Franz Heinrich

A billiard room (also billiards room, or more specifically pool room, snooker room) is a recreation room, such as in a house or recreation center, with a billiards, pool or snooker table (The term "billiard room" or "pool room" may also be used for a business providing public billiards tables; see billiard hall.).

The billiard room may be in the public center of the house or the private areas of the house.

Billiard rooms require proper lighting and clearances for game playing. Although there are adjustable cue sticks on the market, 1.5 m (5 ft) of clearance around the pool table is ideal.

Interior designer Charlotte Moss believed that "a billiard room is synonymous with group dynamics. It's where you mix drinks and embark on a little friendly competition..."

== History ==
Billiards probably developed from one of the late-14th century or early-15th century lawn games in which players hit balls with sticks. The earliest mention of pool as an indoor table game is in a 1470 inventory list of the accounts of King Louis XI of France.

Following the French Revolution and the Napoleonic Wars, billiard rooms were added to some famous 18th-century cafés in Paris and other cities.

Although billiards had long been enjoyed by both men and women, a trend towards male suites developed in 19th century Great Britain. These male suites paired billiard rooms with smoking rooms and sometimes libraries. One example of these male suites is Castle Carr near Halifax. By the turn of the century, billiard rooms were considered a standard feature in great British houses with House Beautiful claiming "Up-to-date owners of English estates have installed billiard rooms..." Many mid- and late-19th century billiard rooms were designed in an Oriental or Moorish style. Mark Twain's billiard room in Hartford, CT was decorated with quasi-Moorish stencils. The late 19th and early 20th century represent the billiard room's heyday.

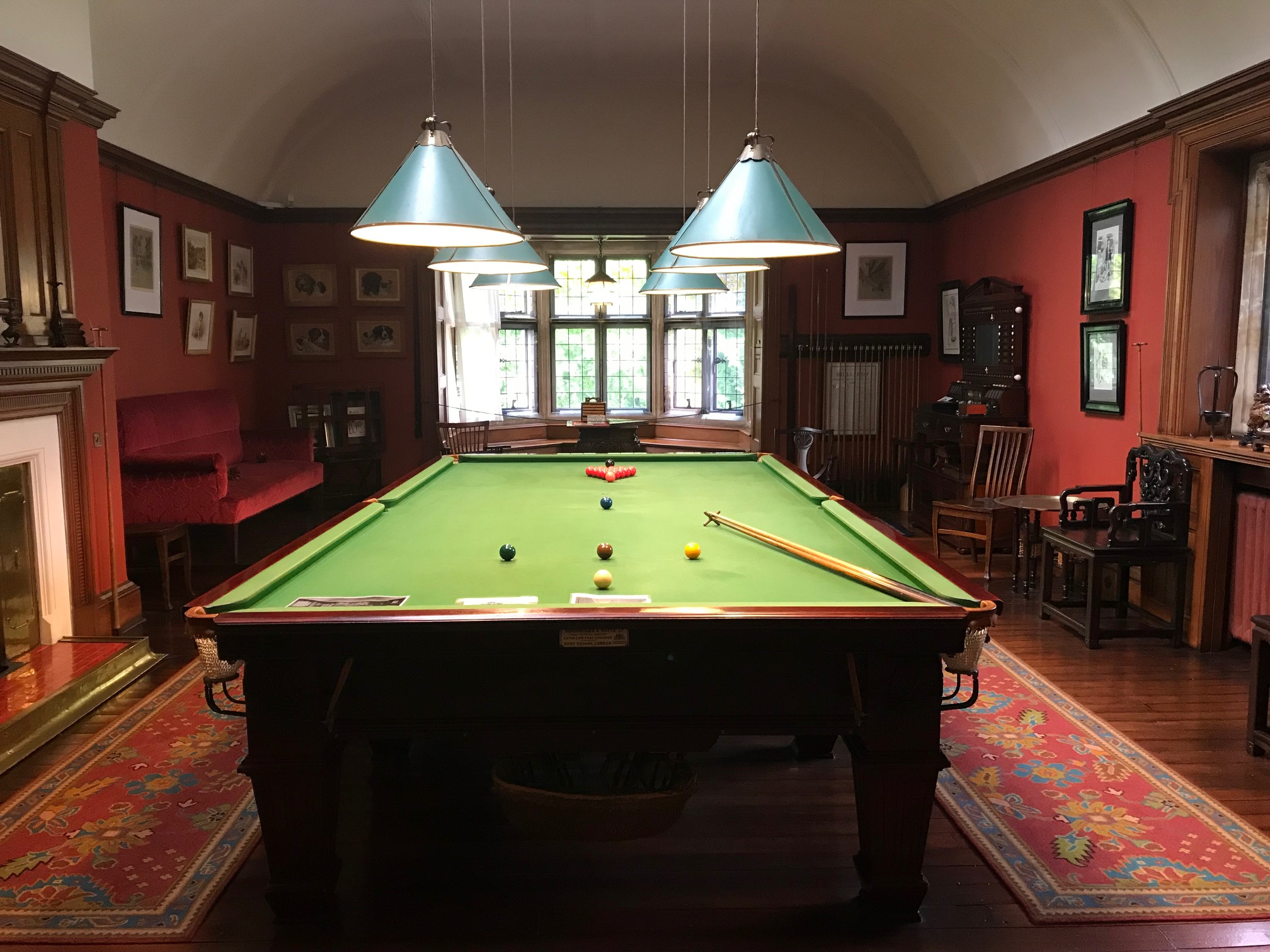
Edwardian billiard room at Olveston Historic Home (built 1907), with overhead electric lights and skylight

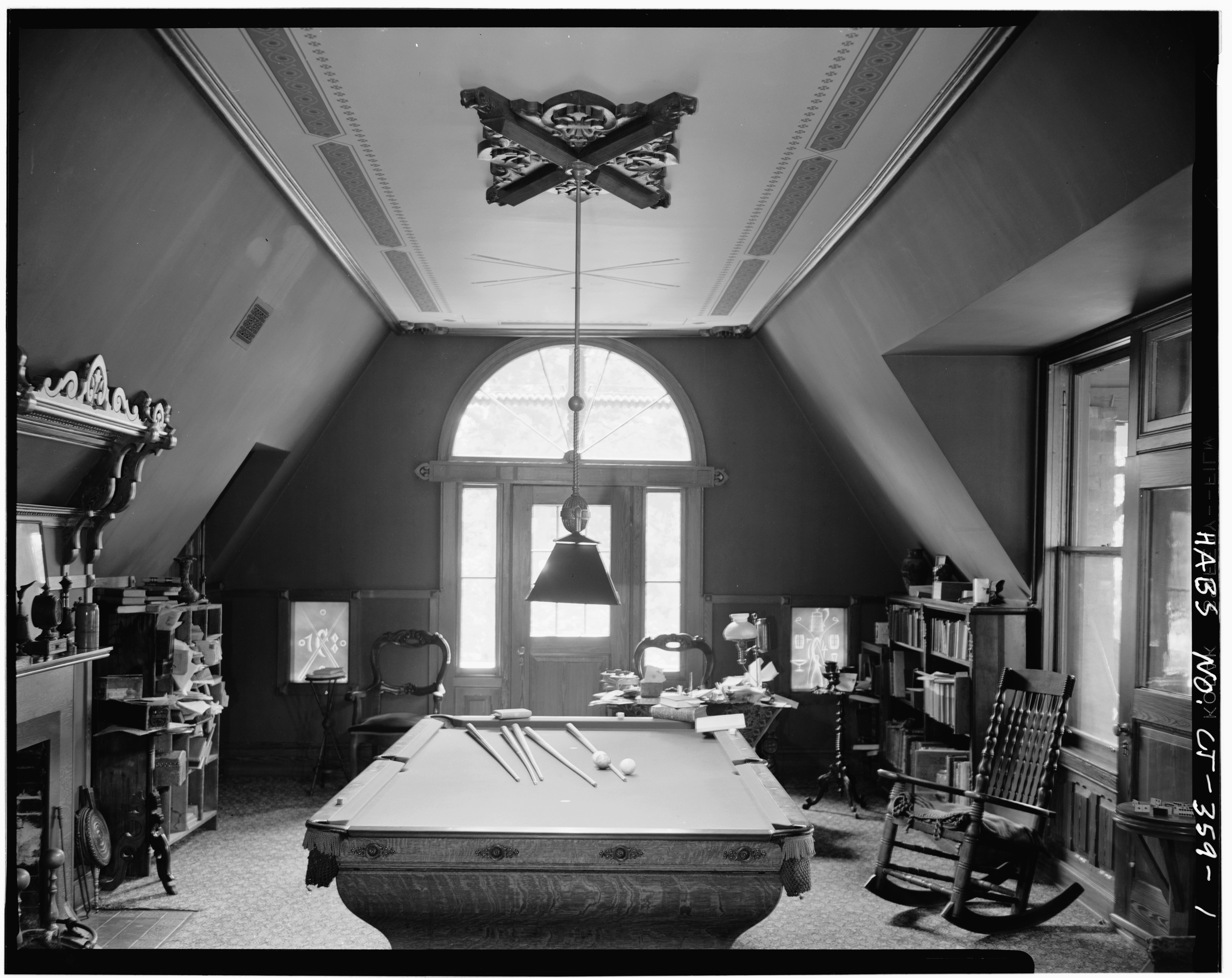
Billiard Room of Mark Twain House

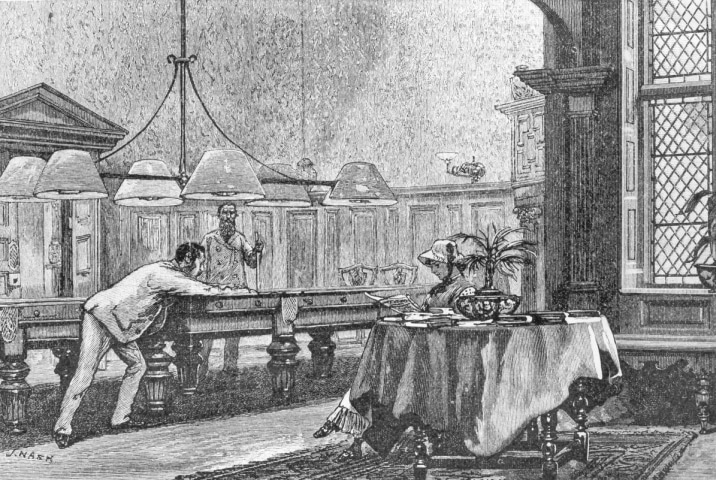
Sketch of The Club, Bedford Park, 1880
