= Friend or Foe? (game show) =

Television series

- Logo
- Presented by: Lisa Kennedy Montgomery (credited as Kennedy); Mark L. Walberg (April Fools only)
- Country of origin: United States
- No. of seasons: 2
- No. of episodes: 105

Production
- Running time: 30 minutes
- Production companies: Buccieri Entertainment; Game Show Network Originals

Original release
- Network: GSN
- Release: June 3, 2002 – April 1, 2003

Friend or Foe? is an American game show based on knowledge and trust which aired on Game Show Network. Three teams of two strangers attempted to persuade their partner to share their accumulated winnings rather than steal them for themselves.

The show premiered June 3, 2002, and aired for two seasons totaling 105 episodes. It was hosted by Lisa Kennedy Montgomery, who was credited as "Kennedy", except for the April Fool's Day 2003 episode (the final first-run episode), in which Mark L. Walberg, the host of Russian Roulette, hosted as part of GSN's April Fools prank; the hosts traded shows for the day made cameo appearances and played for charity on Lingo.

The show "re-debuted" in 2008, re-airing episodes from the series during that year.

== Gameplay ==
=== Main game ===
The six contestants are initially divided into two groups of three, and the members of the first group each secretly choose a member of the second one as their teammates. Any second-group member who receives two or more votes may partner with the first-group member of their choice who voted for them. A second round of voting is held if necessary until all three teams have been formed. Each team is given a "trust fund," which is staked with $200.

The main game is played in two rounds. In each round, Montgomery asks a series of four multiple-choice questions, each with four answer choices. On each question, the teammates have 15 seconds to agree on an answer and simultaneously lock it in on separate keypads. Correct answers add $500 to the trust fund in round one, and $1,000 in round two, and there is no penalty for incorrect answers or failing to respond in time. At the end of each round, the team with the lowest total is eliminated and must go to the "Trust Box" to determine the fate of their money. If there is a tie for a low score, the team that took more time overall to lock in their answers for that round is eliminated.

The Trust Box presents the eliminated team with a variation of the prisoner's dilemma. Each contestant attempts to persuade the other to trust him or her, after which they secretly vote "friend" or "foe." If both vote "friend," they split the trust fund evenly. If one votes "friend" and the other "foe," the foe collects the entire trust fund and the friend receives nothing. If both vote "foe," neither contestant wins any money.

=== Endgame ===
In the "Right or Wrong?" bonus round, the team has 60 seconds to answer a maximum of 10 questions, each of which has two answer choices. Each correct answer adds $500 to the trust fund, while each miss penalizes the team with a strike. The round ends immediately if the team earns three strikes. Answering all 10 questions correctly doubles the entire trust fund, for a potential maximum of $22,400 ($11,200 per player if both players chose Friend). The team then advances to the Trust Box in the manner described above.

== Season two changes ==
In season two, the contestant pairing process was not shown on air, and the teams were not given an initial stake at the beginning of the game. As a result, the potential prize decreased to $22,000 ($11,000 per player if both players chose Friend). If a team was eliminated without earning any money, they were given $200 ($100 per player if both players chose Friend) to risk at the Trust Box.

== Pilot ==
In 2001, a pilot for the show hosted by Justin Gunnwas produced where it had different rules that in the series such as the fact that teams had 60 seconds to answer the questions as opposed to 15. The most obvious difference was that the stakes were higher:

- Round 1 - $10,000 (Reduces by $1,000 every 6 seconds)
- Round 2 - $20,000 (Reduces by $2,000 every 6 seconds)

== See also ==
- Shafted (British game show similar to Friend or Foe?)
- Golden Balls (British game show that used the same payout structure as Friend or Foe?)
- Take It All (American game show with the final round similar to Friend or Foe?)
