= Bob Richter =

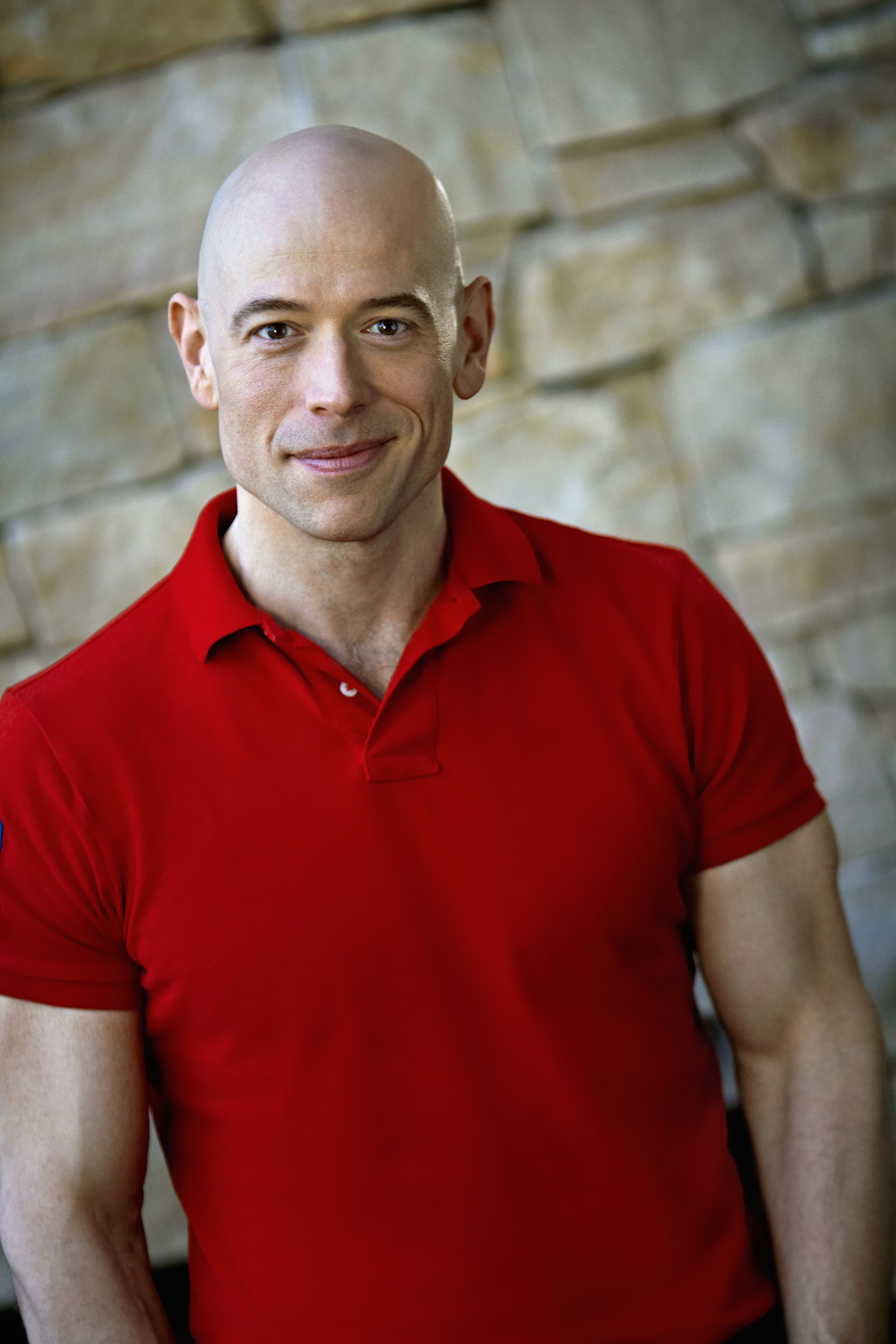
- Born: July 9, 1970 (age 56)
- Occupations: Author, TV personality, and interior designer
- Notable work: A Very Vintage Christmas, Vintage Living, and A Very Vintage Holiday
- Website: http://www.richterdesign.net

Bob Richter (born July 9, 1970) is America's Vintage Lifestyle Expert, as well as an author, TV personality, and interior designer. Bob is known for his starring role in the PBS series Market Warriors. He is also the author of A Very Vintage Christmas, Vintage Living, A Very Vintage Holiday, and Visions of a Very Vintage Christmas. Bob is regularly featured on outlets like Good Morning America, TODAY, CBS News, Hallmark Channel, The New York Times, Parade Magazine, The Huffington Post, and Entertainment Weekly.

== Biography ==
Born and raised in Allentown, Pennsylvania, Bob grew up in the family interior design business, which ensured he always had summer employment and set the stage for his appreciation of textile and color. Heading up the family business, Bob's Grandmother trained his eye and helped to form his aesthetic at a very early age. Until her death at age 97, Bob's grandmother continued to be a touchstone for him, and he still considers her one of his greatest sources of inspiration.

Bob studied at NYU, where he earned his BA in Communication, and then his MA in Education. During his studies, he also worked for an antiques dealer, acquiring knowledge in the area of art and antiques in addition to his formal education.

Bob then began a career in public relations, eventually launching his own firm, Richter Media. Simultaneously, he continued to keep his passion for design at the forefront of his life, frequenting auctions, flea markets and thrift shops. Over time, he began to apply his expertise to interior design jobs with the launch of Richter Design.

On the charitable front, Bob is a supporter of Housing Works, for whom he's designed rooms, and in return, raised money for their cause at the annual event, Design on a Dime. In the years that Bob has been a featured designer, he's worked alongside television personalities including Ty Pennington, Jaclyn Smith, Charlotte Moss and Miles Redd.

In addition to his other endeavors, Bob also teaches Undergraduates at NYU, and works as a voice-over artist. His voice has most recently been behind such brands as Comcast, Carrabba's Italian Grill, Chase and Labatt Blue, and was also used in the 2013 feature film Bert and Arnie's Guide to Friendship.

== Career ==
=== Interior design ===
As a designer, Bob’s work has run the gamut from Texas ranches and mid-century Pennsylvania country homes to Manhattan pied-a-terres and brownstones.

His work has been featured on HGTV’s Design Happens, The New York Times, and other major publications. He’s been known to encourage homeowners to take risks, experiment with color, and "go with their gut when it comes to what [they] love.” His design projects also tend to place a massive emphasis on antiques and reclaimed items. He has cited Tony Duquette as his design hero (adopting the tongue-in-cheek mantra, “More is more” as a nod to him).

An avid collector of antique Christmas ornaments and a self-proclaimed "Christmas Fanatic", Bob was, in December 2010, featured in a front-page story of The New York Times Home Section, alongside famed Designers Mary McDonald and Vern Yip.

He has been featured as an expert Martha Stewart Living Radio’s Home Design program on Sirius XM Radio, as an expert on flea markets, auctions, and tag sales. The program is hosted by Kevin Sharkey, Martha Stewart Living Omnimedia's ExecutiveVice President and Executive Director of Design, who is often described as Stewart's right-hand man.

Bob also creates editorial and video content about antiques, art, flea markets, books and world travel. Popular shopping site One Kings Lane also features Bob as a TasteMaker.

=== Television ===
Bob is known to TV audiences for his starring role in the PBS series Market Warriors and as host on Minute Makeover. He also makes frequent appearances on ABC, CBS, and the Hallmark Channel (particularly Home and Family) where he is known as "America’s Vintage Lifestyle Expert," offering suggestions on how to collect and decorate with vintage finds.

=== Writing career ===
As an author, Bob has written 3 books, A Very Vintage Christmas, Vintage Living and A Very Vintage Holiday.

Bob also has an extensive presence in online publications, such as in his frequent contributions to the Home, Style, Arts and Travel sections of the Huffington Post, as well as Guideposts where he shares his spiritual take on holiday decorating and living the vintage way.

He also contributed to The Christmas Book.

== Bibliography ==
=== As author ===
- A Very Vintage Christmas (July 2016, Globe Pequot, ISBN 978-1493022144)
- Vintage Living (March 19, 2019, Rizzoli, ISBN 978-0847865314)
- A Very Vintage Holiday (September 5, 2023, Globe Pequot, ISBN 978-1493072828)
- Visions of a Very Vintage Christmas (July 23, 2026, Globe Pequot, ISBN 978-1493092567)

=== As contributor ===
- The Christmas Book (Phaidon, August 2023, ISBN 978-1838665968)

== Filmography ==
- Minute MakeOver
- Market Warriors
- Flea Market Minute
