= The Mark Walberg Show =

American tabloid talk show

- Genre: Tabloid talk show
- Starring: Mark L. Walberg
- Country of origin: United States

Production
- Running time: 60 minutes
- Production companies: Four Point Entertainment; New World Entertainment

Original release
- Network: Broadcast syndication
- Release: September 11, 1995 – May 31, 1996

The Mark Walberg Show is an American daytime talk show that was hosted by Mark L. Walberg. The show ran in syndication for one season from September 11, 1995, to May 31, 1996.
