= Market Warriors =

- Genre: Reality
- Created by: Marsha Bemko
- Presented by: Mark L. Walberg
- Starring: Kevin Bruneau; John Bruno; Miller Gaffney; Bob Richter; Bene Raia
- Narrated by: Mark L. Walberg; Fred Willard
- Country of origin: United States
- Original language: English
- No. of seasons: 1
- No. of episodes: 20

Production
- Executive producer: Marsha Bemko
- Producers: John Kalish; Sam Farrell
- Production location: United States
- Cinematography: Trevor Hansford
- Editors: Peter Hyzak; Sean Sandefur; Sharon Singer
- Running time: 55 minutes
- Production company: WGBH

Original release
- Network: PBS
- Release: July 16, 2012 – April 22, 2013

Related
- Antiques Roadshow

Market Warriors is an American reality television series that follows four professional antiquers as they buy assigned items at flea markets and antique shows on a budget. The items are then sold at auction, where the antiquers compete for the highest profit, which is most often determined by the lowest loss.

Market Warriors has a number of connections to Antiques Roadshow: both are produced by WGBH, Boston, hosted by Mark L. Walberg, and share the participation of appraisers Miller Gaffney, Kevin Bruneau, John Bruno, Bene Raia, and Bob Richter.

Fred Willard was the original host of the show; however, after his arrest for engaging in alleged acts at an adult movie theater, for which he was never charged, PBS dropped him as host and had Walberg re-voice the episodes Willard had already completed.

On March 13, 2013, PBS announced it was ending production of Market Warriors, the series that premiered in July 2012 under Market Wars as a partner program to longtime ratings hit Antiques Roadshow, according to a March 14, 2013, WGBH, Boston, internal memo to employees. Marsha Bemko, executive producer of both programs, commented the decision was PBS's and declined further comment. The last of the show's 20 episodes aired on PBS stations on April 22, 2013.

== Episodes ==
- Episode 101: Antiquing in Adamstown, PA
- Episode 102: Antiquing in Philadelphia, PA
- Episode 103: Antiquing in Cumming, GA
- Episode 104: Antiquing in Brimfield, MA - Part 1
- Episode 105: Antiquing in Springfield, OH
- Episode 106: Antiquing in Brimfield, MA - Part 2
- Episode 107: Antiquing in Pasadena, CA
- Episode 108: Antiquing in Canton, TX - Part 1
- Episode 109: Antiquing in Burlington, KY
- Episode 110: Antiquing in Canton, TX - Part 2
- Episode 111: Antiquing in New York, NY
- Episode 112: Antiquing in New Milford, CT
- Episode 113: Antiquing in Walnut, IA
- Episode 114: Antiquing in Chicago, IL
- Episode 115: Antiquing in Long Beach, CA
- Episode 116: Antiquing in Chantilly, VA
- Episode 117: Antiquing in Greenwich, NY
- Episode 118: Antiquing in Oronoco, MN
- Episode 119: Antiquing in Rochester, MN
- Episode 120: Antiquing in Liberty, NC

== See also ==
- Bargain Hunt
