= Rosyjska ruletka =

- First titles
- Presented by: Henryk Talar (season 1); Krzysztof Ibisz (season 2)
- Country of origin: Poland
- No. of seasons: 2

Production
- Running time: 45 minutes

Original release
- Network: Polsat
- Release: September 3, 2002 – April 7, 2004

Rosyjska ruletka (English translation: Russian Roulette) was a Polish game show based on the original American format of Russian Roulette. The show was hosted by Krzysztof Ibisz (earlier by actor Henryk Talar). The main goal of the game was to win 100,000 zlotys. Rosyjska Ruletka was broadcast from 2002 to 2004. It was shown on the Polish TV station Polsat. Only one person won zl 100,000.

== Differences from U.S. Version ==
=== Program Length and Number of Contestants ===
Unlike the American format of Russian Roulette, which only ran a half-hour and had four players, the Polish version ran 60 minutes and had five contestants.

=== Time Limit to Answer ===
The players also had 30 seconds to answer in the first season and 20 in the second season (as opposed to just 10 in the US), and also kept track of the players' heart rates throughout the show (first season only).

=== Cash Amounts per Question ===
The contestants all began Round 1 with zl 300, with correct answers adding that amount to the total. Like the US version, a wrong answer gave all money to the challenger, and the contestant had to play Russian Roulette by pulling the lever in front of them. The values increased to zl 600 for Round 2, zl 1,000 for Round 3, and zl 1,500 for Round 4. Also unlike the US version, in Round 4, the contestant in control couldn't answer the question themselves. They always had to challenge their opponent.

Unlike the US version, which increased the number of drop zones per question (up to a maximum of five), the number of drop zones remained the same for the entire round, but matching the number of the round (1 drop zone in Round 1, 2 drop zones in Round 2, etc.; only the bonus round ever saw a use of five drop zones).

=== Question Format ===
The Polish version also increased the number of possible answers for each question in each round: two possible answers for Round 1, three for Round 2, four for Round 3, and five for Round 4. The bonus round questions did not have multiple choice answers.

Unlike the US version, where each round was played with a time limit, both Polish versions used a specific maximum number of questions:

- Round 1: 8 questions with 2 possible answers
- Round 2: 7 questions with 3 possible answers
- Round 3: 6 questions with 4 possible answers
- Round 4: 5 questions with 5 possible answers

If nobody dropped by the time all questions had been exhausted, the player in the lead won immunity from the drop zones and had to pull the lever on the host's podium to send somebody else to drop. In this circumstance, if the player who dropped had any money in their bank account, it was then divided evenly among the remaining players. If there was a tie for the lead, the host pulled the lever, and all players were in danger of dropping.

In the case of Round 4, if all questions were used, the host pulled his podium's lever to start one last game of Russian Roulette to determine the winner, regardless of scores.

=== Starting Each Round ===
In the first season, the host pulled a lever in the center of the stage, and a blue light spun around to determine the first player. The second season just announced which player was randomly selected to start first (although also done by a random spin as triggered by the host; but this time the red light spun around the whole set with all other lights blue).

=== Bonus Round ===
==== First Version ====
In the first season, the contestant pulled the lever on the host's podium to randomly assign trapdoors to open, but he/she wouldn't know if the trapdoor would open or not if he/she gave a wrong answer to a question (with no multiple choice). Giving a correct answer meant the contestant won the money and had the option to quit or continue. Giving a wrong answer but standing on a safe zone meant the contestant won no money, but was allowed to continue; however, standing on a drop zone rigged to open would mean he or she would drop out of the game and lose all bonus winnings accumulated (front game winnings were safe). The first question was worth zl 5,000 the second worth zl 25,000, and the third worth zl 100,000. Players could quit after a correct answer and take the winnings.

For the first question in this version, 3 dropzones were active; for the second, 4; and, for the third, 5 dropzones. Thus, the risk was greater as the rewards increased.

It is not known what would have happened had a contestant playing for zl 100,000 gave the wrong answer, but picked the one trap door that wouldn't open, as this never happened.

==== Second Version ====
In the second season, the bonus round required 10 correct answers within 60 seconds a total of three times in order to win zl 100,000, with a drop zone opening every 10 seconds. If time ran out or the player gave one incorrect answer, he/she dropped out of the game.

The first time around, the player would win zl 5,000 for giving 10 correct answers. The second time around, the player would win zl 25,000, and the third time, the player would win zl 100,000. All bonus winnings were added to the player's winnings from the main game, and players could quit with their winnings at any time. If they chose to continue, however, it was all or nothing.

Only one player won zl 100,000, and her win was later featured in the show's introduction.

== Notes ==
The second season's set and graphics were changed to reflect the American version, and the music was updated. It was also used to promote a very lively environment with noisy crowds, while the first version's set was dark, and the music was legitimately scary, leaving the audience to only get lively near the end (though sometimes the audience would liven up to get behind a player they'd support).

When Ibisz hosted the program, he'd frequently make references to his other game show, Awantura o kasę.
