= Getting the Last Laugh =

- Written by: Shelley Ross; Fred Willard
- Directed by: Bob Fraser
- Starring: Sandahl Bergman; Fred Willard; Kerry Millerick
- Music by: Stacy Widelitz, Wendy Fraser
- Country of origin: United States
- Original language: English

Production
- Producers: Alan Landsburg, Woody Fraser
- Editors: George Copanus, Brandon Miller
- Production companies: Chip Enterprises, Landsburg Company

Original release
- Network: ABC
- Release: February 26, 1985

Getting the Last Laugh was a comedy TV movie special produced by the Landsburg Company, and first broadcast on the ABC network in 1985. It consisted of multiple segments with humorous tips to get revenge on the things that annoy us in everyday life. Guest stars included Danny Thomas, Shirley Jones, Rona Barrett, Ray Parker Jr., Jerry Mathers, and Barbara Billingsley. It was written by Fred Willard and Shelley Ross. In one segment, Ray Parker Jr. reprises his hit Ghostbusters theme ("Who you gonna call?") in a parody poking fun at uncooperative machines, with cameo appearances by Richard Simmons, Hervé Villechaize, Barbara Billingsley, and Rene Auberjonois.
