= The Game Plane =

- Genre: Game show
- Presented by: Mark L. Walberg; Jay Flats
- Country of origin: United States
- No. of seasons: 2

Production
- Executive producer: Jeff Mirkin
- Production companies: Alpine Labs; Trifecta Entertainment & Media

Original release
- Network: Syndicated; Discovery Family
- Release: September 20, 2014 – March 22, 2016

The Game Plane is a syndicated American game show produced by Alpine Labs. The series, hosted by Mark L. Walberg and Jay Flats, debuted on September 20, 2014. A second season was ordered on January 18, 2015. The second season of the show bowed on September 29, 2015, and aired only on Discovery Family.

== Format ==
Passengers on (generally longer) Allegiant Air flights compete by playing various games while on the plane to win prizes such as cash or vacations. The bonus round (dubbed "The Big Deal") is played by the two players who won the most in money and prizes during the first three rounds of the show and is played like Card Sharks, where the players have to guess whether each card held by a person on the flight is higher or lower than the previous card. The player or team who guesses the most right in a row wins a bonus prize.
