= Tiki Adult Theater =

Pornographic movie theater in Los Angeles

Coordinates: 34.090767°N 118.3083°W

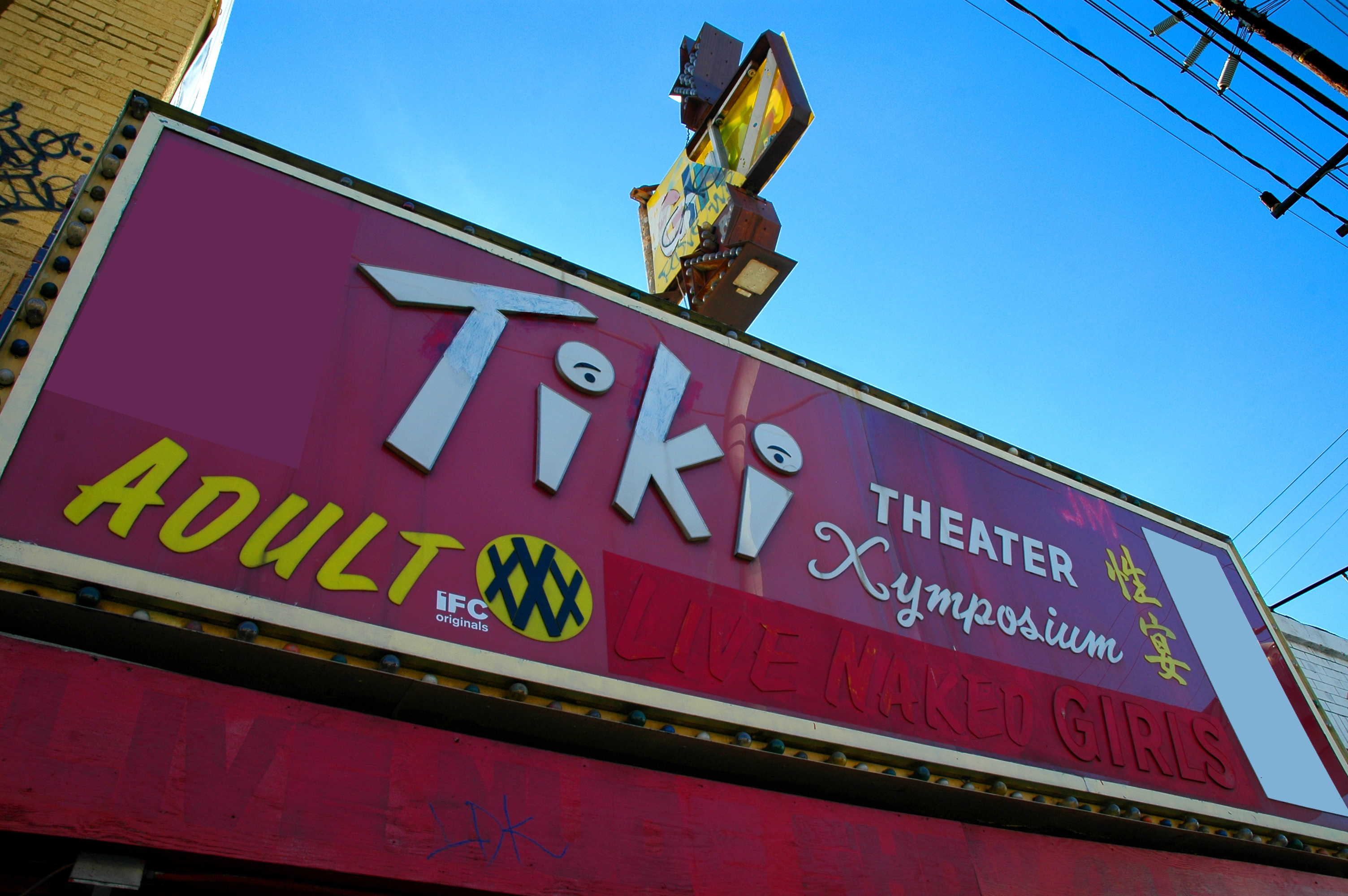
Former signage of the Tiki Adult Theater, now replaced by a more modern sign

The Tiki Adult Theater, at one time signed as the Tiki Theater Xymposium, is an adult theater in Los Angeles, California, located on Santa Monica Boulevard. As of 2023, it was the last remaining adult theater in Los Angeles. It was formerly part of the Pussycat Theater chain of pornographic movie theaters. As of 2017, it was open 24 hours a day, with a ticket buying 4 hours admission. The theater’s sign was also used as an in-game texture in Grand Theft Auto: San Andreas.
