= Russian Roulette (game show) =

American game show (2002–2003)

- Genre: Game show
- Created by: Gunnar Wetterberg
- Written by: Hennen L. Chambers; Renee Paulo; Tony Soltis
- Directed by: Lenn Goodside
- Presented by: Dr. Julian Sedgwick (pilot episode); Mark L. Walberg (official)
- Narrated by: Burton Richardson
- Music by: Todd Schroeder (pilot and International only); Craig Stuart Garfinkle
- Country of origin: United States
- No. of seasons: 2
- No. of episodes: 131

Production
- Executive producers: Gunnar Wetterberg; Michael Canter
- Producer: Howard C. Bauer
- Production locations: Tribune Studios; Hollywood, California
- Editors: David Frediani; Tony Fisher
- Running time: 22 minutes
- Production companies: Gunnar Wetterberg Productions; Sony Pictures Television (Note: Credited as Columbia TriStar Domestic Television (seasons 1–2).); Game Show Network Originals

Original release
- Network: Game Show Network
- Release: June 3, 2002 – June 13, 2003

Russian Roulette is an American game show created and executive produced by Gunnar Wetterberg that ran for two seasons on Game Show Network from June 3, 2002, to June 13, 2003.

The show was hosted by Mark L. Walberg (excluding the April Fool's Day episode that was hosted by Todd Newton) and announced by Burton Richardson.

== Gameplay ==
The Russian Roulette set consists of a circle with six trapdoors (referred to as "zones" by the host). Four consecutive positions are occupied by the contestants, each of whom has a slot-machine handle within easy reach. Throughout the game, zones are lit in blue or red to designate them as "safe" or "drop" zones, respectively. The first question of each round is played with one drop zone, and another zone is added on each subsequent question to a maximum of five.

Contestants are given $150 each at the start of the game.

=== First round ===
One contestant is randomly chosen as the first challenger and asked a question, then must choose one opponent to answer it. That opponent is then given three answer choices and has 10 seconds to respond. A right answer awards $150 and makes them the challenger for the next question. However, a wrong answer or failure to respond in time forfeits all their money to the challenger and forces them to play Russian Roulette to determine whether they stay in the game. The opponent pulls the handle at their position to spin the arrangement of safe/drop zones around the six trapdoors. If a safe zone lands at the opponent's position, they become the challenger for the next question; if a drop zone lands at their position, they are eliminated and the trapdoor opens, causing them to fall through the stage and out of sight.

The round ends when one contestant has been eliminated or time runs out, whichever occurs first. In the latter case, if one contestant is in the lead alone, they step off their zone and pull a handle at center stage to spin one drop zone among the other three contestants and eliminate one of them. If there is a tie for the lead, all four contestants are in danger and the host pulls the handle. The eliminated contestant's money (if any) is evenly divided among the other three.

=== Second and third rounds ===
The second round is played similarly to the first, with the three remaining contestants answering questions that have four answer choices and are worth $200 each. The high scorer from the first round becomes the first challenger; in case of a tie, a random draw decides who will start.

The third round follows the same rules as the second, with questions now worth $300 (season 1) or $250 (season 2). Now, however, the challenger may either pass a question to the opponent or try to answer it directly. The last contestant standing keeps their money and advances to the bonus round; if time runs out, the low scorer forfeits their money to the high scorer and is automatically eliminated. Ties are broken as in the first two rounds.

=== Bonus round ===
The champion has 60 seconds to answer a set of questions, with one drop zone opening at the end of every 10 seconds, starting with the one to the champion's left and proceeding clockwise. They may pass a question and return to it after playing through all others if time permits, but drop immediately on a wrong answer or if time runs out. Money is awarded for each correct answer given before the champion drops.

The number, type, and value of questions are as follows.

- Season 1: Five brain-teasers are asked, involving challenges such as math problems, anagrams, and general-knowledge questions. The clock begins to run as soon as the host begins to ask the first question, and the champion may think aloud but must say "My answer is..." before responding. Each right answer awards $500.
- Season 2: Ten multiple-choice questions are asked, each with three similar-sounding choices. The clock begins to run after the host finishes asking the first question. The contestant is no longer required to say "My answer is..." in this part of the round. Each right answer awards $300.

Correctly answering all questions before time runs out increases the champion's bonus round winnings to $10,000. They may either stop playing at this point and keep all winnings, or give up the $10,000 and play one final round of Russian Roulette, using the number of drop zones that opened during the question round. If a drop zone lands at the champion's position, they drop with no further winnings; if a safe zone lands at their position, they win $100,000. Three contestants won this top prize over the entire run of the series.

The champion's main-game winnings are not at risk, and any money won in the bonus round is in addition to this total.

== International versions ==
On all versions of Russian Roulette outside of the U.S., the UK, Argentina, Portugal, and Poland (in season two), there are also displays of the contestants' heart rates on the screen (examples include Russia's, Poland's (season one), U.S. Pilot episode and Hong Kong's versions), and most versions even have the contestants themselves asking questions to their opponents. There is also a camera underneath each of the trapdoors to catch footage of the contestant dropping from another angle. Some may also have a maximum time limit of 15 seconds instead of 10 to answer questions. The Polish version has 30 seconds to answer the question in season one and 20 seconds in season two. Most versions of the show (except for the versions in the U.S., Greece, Taiwan and India) run for an hour rather than a half-hour. As of 2013, there are no versions of the show still in production internationally. However, China's regional broadcaster Shandong TV revived the show in the Spring of 2015 as a substitute for the previous edition using the format of The Million Pound Drop. This version uses a slightly different format – the daily prize fund always starts at RMB¥50,000, and each correct answer before the final round adds RMB¥1,000 to the final pot. The Chinese version is broadcast live on weekdays and runs for 65 minutes (including commercials).

Country	Name	Host	Channel	Prize	Air dates
Argentina	Decisión Final	Horacio Cabak	América	AR$100,000	June 6, 2003
Brazil	Roleta Russa	Milton Neves	Rede Record	R$500,000	October 31, 2002 – October 31, 2003
Bulgaria	Руска pулeткa Ruska ruletka	Nikolay Georgiev	BNT 1	100,000лв	April 2003 – March 2004
Chile	Ruleta Rusa	Diana Bolocco	Canal 13	$100,000,000	May 5, 2013
Egypt	الدائرة; El Daera	Ayman Kaisouni	ERTU1	£E250,000	September 2010
Greece; Cyprus	Ρωσική Ρουλέτα; Rosiki Rouleta	Miltos Makridis	Mega Channel	€100,000	2002–2003
Hong Kong	一觸即發	Dayo Wong	TVB Jade	HK$500,000	May 24, 2002 – September 27, 2002
India	Bachke Rehnaa Zara Sambhalna	Mohnish Behl	SET	Rs.1,000,000	September 9, 2002 – March 3, 2003
Indonesia	Russian Roulette	Dede Yusuf	Trans TV	Rp100,000,000	September 4, 2002 – December 31, 2003
Poland	Rosyjska ruletka	Henryk Talar; Krzysztof Ibisz	Polsat	100,000 zł	September 3, 2002 – April 7, 2004
Portugal	Decisão Final	José Carlos Malato	RTP1	€30,000	May 28, 2012 – January 13, 2013
Romania	Ruleta Rusească	Răzvan Exarhu; Florin Mihoc	TVR 2	10,000,000,000 old lei (2003–2004); 1,000,000 new lei (2005–2006)	2003–2006
Russia	Русская рулетка Russkaya ruletka	Valdis Pelsh; Maxim Galkin (December 25, 2002)	Channel One	₽1,000,000	April 2, 2002 – August 6, 2004
Serbia and Montenegro	Ruski rulet! Руски рулет!	Irfan Mensur	RTV Pink	3,000,000 RSD €2,000	March 12, 2003 – September 23, 2004
Serbia and Montenegro	Ruski Rulet Show! Руски рулет шоу! (VIP version)	Milan Kalinić	RTV Pink	€2,000	September 15, 2003 – July 16, 2005
Serbia; Croatia; Bosnia and Herzegovina; Montenegro; Slovenia; North Macedonia	Ruski rulet! Руски рулет!	Dragan Marinković Maca	RTV Pink; Pink BH; Pink M	€2,000	April 17, 2007 – September 4, 2007
Singapore	灵机一洞	Hsu Nai-lin	MediaCorp TV Channel 8	S$10,000	2003–2004
Spain	Decisión Final	Luis Lorenzo Crespo	Telecinco	€100,000 + accumulating jackpot	March 18, 2002 – April 24, 2002
Taiwan	俄羅斯輪盤	Kevin Tsai (Cai Kangyong)	Star Chinese Channel	NT$1,000,000	2003
Turkey	Rus Ruleti	Berkun Oya	Star TV	1,000,000YTL	April 12, 2008
United Kingdom	Russian Roulette	Rhona Cameron	ITV	£10,000	October 31, 2002 – April 22, 2003

The format was optioned by television networks in the Middle East, Portugal (SIC), Malaysia (NTV7), Italy (Mediaset) and Hungary in 2004, but they never made it to production in those territories.

== See also ==
- La'uf al HaMillion
- Who's Still Standing?
