= Charlotte Moss =

American interior designer and author

Charlotte Ann Moss
- Born: Richmond, Virginia, US
- Education: Virginia Commonwealth University
- Occupations: interior designer, author
- Website: CharlotteMoss.com

Charlotte Moss is an American interior designer, author, and philanthropist. Since launching her career in 1985, she has received numerous honors, including the New York School of Interior Design's Centennial Medal, Elle Décor Vision Award, and the Timeless Design Award from the Royal Oak Foundation. Charlotte is named one of Elle Décor's Grand Masters Top Designers. She lectures widely on the arts of living, has authored 12 books, and writes for several magazines.

== Early life ==
Charlotte Moss was born in Richmond, Virginia. After high school, she enrolled as an English major at Virginia Commonwealth University (VCU), where she worked in the admissions office. In 1978 she moved to New York City and landed a job at a brokerage firm. After spending seven years on Wall Street, a merger prompted Charlotte to reassess the future. With a degree in English and no formal design training, Charlotte opened Charlotte Moss & Co., an interior design company and antique store.

== Career ==
Charlotte Moss has decorated private homes and residences across the United States and abroad. Previous clients include Susan and Michael Bloomberg.

In 2007, she opened the Charlotte Moss Townhouse, a showroom in Manhattan's Upper East Side. New York Cottages & Gardens published a timeline of her career in February, 2020.

Charlotte used her experience culled from thirty-eight years of decorating homes to create several licensed collections. She has designed collections of furniture and upholstery with Century Furniture, fabrics and trims for Fabricut, furniture and wallcoverings for Brunschwig & Fils, carpets and sisals for Stark Carpet, china for Pickard, Garden Planters with Siebert and Rice, her photography prints with Soicher Marin, clothing with IBU Movement, cuff bracelets with P.E. Guerin, mules with Artemis Design Co and accessories with Eastern Accents.

Charlotte lectures extensively on the topic of interior design appearing at showhouses, museums, women's groups, garden clubs, trade fairs, antique shows and corporate events.

== Awards and honorary degree ==
Charlotte has received many awards throughout her career. She has been named an Elle Décor A-List Designer and "Grand Master", a Traditional Home top-20 Design Icon and World's Top 20 Interior Designers. She received the New York School of Interior Design's Centennial Medal of Honor in 2017, Elle Décor's Vision Award in 2009, the Timeless Design Award from the Royal Oak Foundation in 2010, and the Circle of Excellence Award in Interior Design from the International Furnishings & Design Association (IFDA) in 2012. She holds an Honorary Doctorate Degree from The New York School of Interior Design as well as Virginia Commonwealth University, her alma mater.

== Philanthropy and boards ==
Charlotte has been recognized for her philanthropic work over the years. She received the Guild Hall Lifetime Achievement Award for Leadership & Philanthropic Endeavors, the Housing Works Groundbreaker Award, the Edith Wharton Women of Achievement Award, the American Hospital of Paris President's Award and the Boys Harbor, Salute to Achievement Founder's Medal for Philanthropy. In 2013, the Bone Marrow Foundation presented her with the Brandon Tartikoff award. On December 2, 2014, she was one of three honorees at the American Hospital of Paris Foundation's Annual Gala in New York.

Charlotte supports a variety of causes and sits on several boards; she is Emerita Trustee of the Thomas Jefferson Foundation at Monticello, on the Board of The Bone Marrow Foundation, The Order of Saint John, The Madoo Conservancy and the International Council of Hillwood Estate, Museum and Gardens.

Previously she was an honorary trustee of the American Hospital of Paris, a board member of the Elsie de Wolfe Foundation, an Advisory Board Member of the New York School of Interior Design, a trustee of the Edith Wharton Restoration, on the Executive Cabinet of the Leaders of Design Council, a trustee of The Irvington Institute for Medical Research, on the Couture Council of the Museum at F.I.T, a board member at the Bard Center for Graduate Studies, Board Member, a Teach for America Guest Teacher. She was the Vice President of the Parrish Art Museum and a co-chair of their Landscape Pleasures Garden Symposium from 1998 – 2009. Charlotte has chaired and co-chaired many galas including the UNICEF Snowflake Gala, the New York City Ballet Spring Gala, The Smile Collection Gala for Operation Smile, Gala Chair, Fashion Week/Lincoln Center and for the Kips Bay Showhouse Gala.

== Works ==
=== Books ===
To date, Charlotte Moss has authored 11 books.

- A Passion for Detail (1991)
- Creating A Room (1995)
- The Poetry of Home (1998)
- Design Inspirations (2004)
- Winter House (2005)
- A Flair for Living (2008)
- Charlotte Moss Decorates (2011)
- A Visual Life: Scrapbooks, Collages and Inspirations (2013)
- Charlotte Moss: Garden Inspirations (2015)
- Charlotte Moss Entertains (2018)
- Charlotte Moss Flowers (2021)
- Charlotte Moss: At Home in Virginia (2026)

=== Magazine columns ===
- “Women in the Garden” (Flower 2023–present)
- “In Good Taste” (Veranda 2021)
- “Charlotte's Eye” and “Charlotte Moss On” (House Beautiful 2014–2017)
- “Home and Garden” (New York Times T Magazine 2014)
- “Home and Garden” (Wall Street Journal 2010-2013)
