= Mark L. Walberg =

American actor, television personality, and game show host (born 1962)

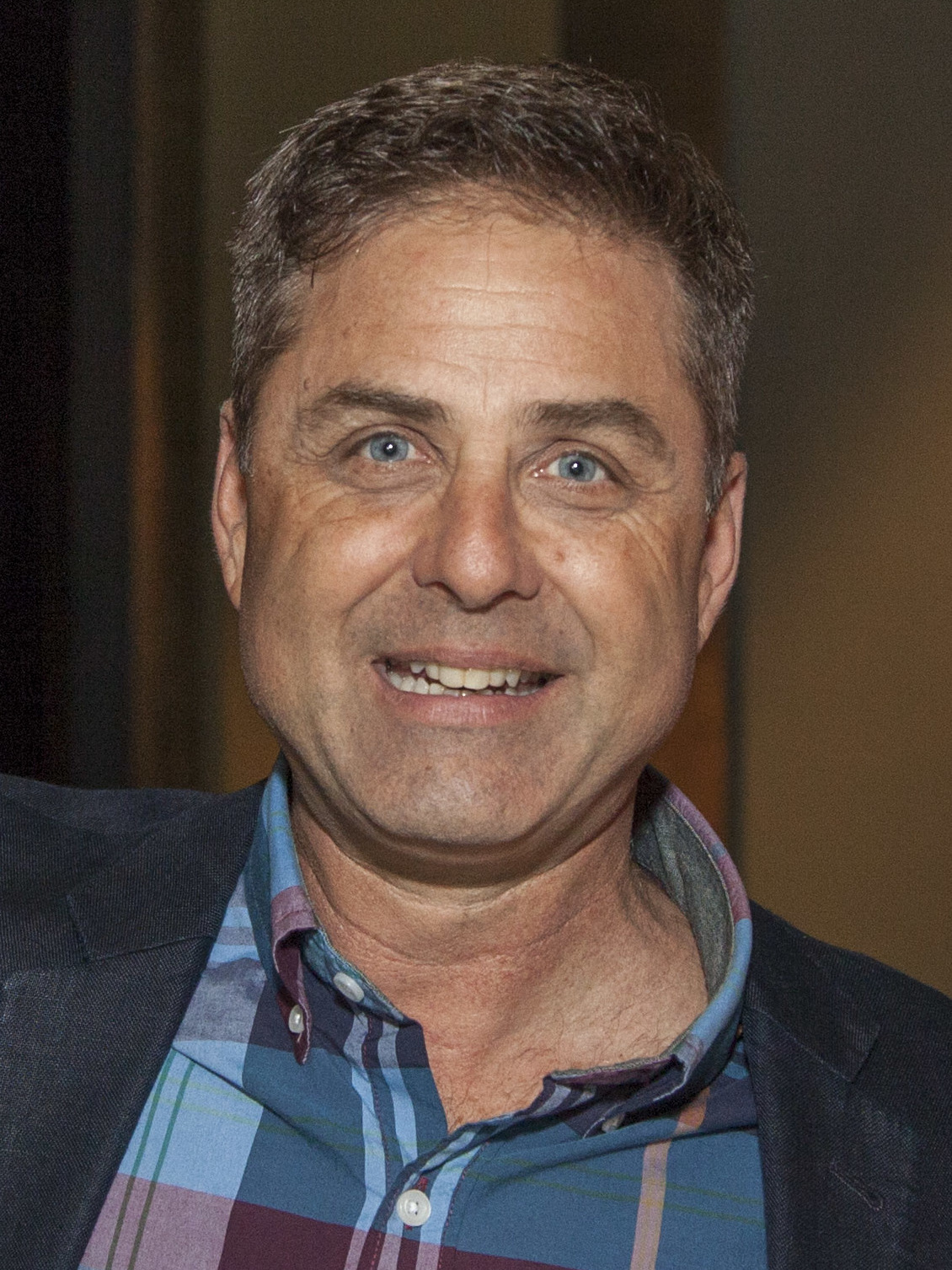
- Walberg in 2013
- Born: Mark Lewis Walberg; August 31, 1962 (age 63); Florence, South Carolina, U.S.
- Occupations: Actor, television personality, game show host
- Years active: 1990–present
- Known for: Antiques Roadshow, Market Warriors, The Moment of Truth, Temptation Island
- Spouse: Robbi Morgan (m. 1987)
- Children: 2

Mark Lewis Walberg (born August 31, 1962) is an American actor, television personality, and game show host best known for hosting Antiques Roadshow, Temptation Island, and the game shows Russian Roulette on GSN and The Moment of Truth on Fox.

== Career ==
From September 1995 to May 1996, Walberg hosted his own American syndicated tabloid talk show, The Mark Walberg Show.

Walberg is on the board of directors of Goodwill Southern California and the board of managers of the Hollywood/Wilshire YMCA. He plays on the World Poker Tour in the Hollywood Home Games for the Goodwill Industries of Southern California.

On the series finale episode (and also as an April Fools Day episode, as in which he is also a contestant in Lingo, playing for charity) on April 1, 2003, Walberg hosted Friend or Foe?. His other game shows included Russian Roulette, also on Game Show Network, who also appeared as an audience member in the April fools episode as a cameo, and the PAX-TV game show On the Cover.

He was slated to host a game show adaptation of the board game Trivial Pursuit: America Plays beginning in fall 2008. Although he hosted the pilot, he was unable to get out of his Fox contract and was replaced by Christopher Knight when the series debuted.

In 2010, Walberg hosted a series on CMT titled Your Chance to Dance.

Walberg was the host of two television shows. In 2006, he joined the PBS series, Antiques Roadshow. While staying with the show through many changes in formatting, he left the show after season 23 in 2019. The Game Plane, the first game show which is shot on an airplane in flight, debuted on Discovery Family channel in 2014.

In 2011, he made a cameo on West Coast Report. Walberg has also been a spokesperson for 23andMe.

He is the current host of Wheel of Fortune Live! and Temptation Island.

== Personal life ==
Walberg has been married to Robbi Morgan since 1987 and they have two children together.

== Filmography ==
=== Television ===
==== Acting ====
Year	Title	Role	Notes
1997, 2000	Hang Time	Chick Storm	2 episodes
2002	Son of the Beach	Mark Walberg	Episode: "Penetration Island"
2004	I Want to Marry Ryan Banks	Stan	Television film
2020	Sneakerheads	Mark Wahlberg	Episode: "The Match"

==== Hosting ====
Year	Title	Notes
1991–1994	Shop 'til You Drop	Co-Host/Also Announcer
1995–1996	The Mark Walberg Show	2 episodes
1996–1997	The Big Date	
2001–2003	Temptation Island	28 episodes
2002	Pyramid	Episode: "Pilot #1"
2002–2003	Russian Roulette	130 episodes
2002–2019	Antiques Roadshow	242 episodes
2003	Joe Millionaire	Episode: "The Aftermath"
2003	Friend or Foe?	Episode dated 1 April 2003
2003	Test the Nation	Television special
2004	On the Cover	94 episodes
2004	Test the Nation 2	Co-host
2006	Three Card Poker National Championship	Television special
2006	L.A. Holiday Celebration	Television special
2008	The Moment of Truth	22 episodes
2010	Your Chance to Dance	11 episodes
2012	Market Warriors	20 episodes
2013	Forever Young	Episode: "Bridging the Gap/The Hunt"
2015	Afternoon Delight Live on Hollywood and Vine	3 episodes
2015–2018	Home & Family	3 episodes; guest host
2019–present	Temptation Island	36 episodes
