= List of Perfect Match contestants =

The following is a list of contestants that have appeared on the Netflix reality series Perfect Match.

== Contestants ==
Key
Winner
Finalist
Eliminated
Contestant entered for the second time
Archive

Season	Cast member	Age	Original series	Status	Ref.
1	Dom Gabriel	30	The Mole 6	Winner	
1	Georgia Hassarati	26	Too Hot to Handle 3	Winner	
1	Bartise Bowden	27	Love Is Blind 3	Finalist	
1	Chloe Veitch	24	Too Hot to Handle 1	Finalist	
1	Izzy Fairthorne	22	Too Hot to Handle 3	Finalist	
1	Joey Sasso	29	The Circle 1	Finalist	
1	Kariselle Snow	27	Sexy Beasts	Finalist	
1	Lauren "LC" Chamblin	31	Love Is Blind 1	Finalist	
1	Nick Uhlenhuth	29	The Circle 3	Finalist	
1	Shayne Jansen	33	Love Is Blind 2	Finalist	
1	Abbey Humphreys	27	Twentysomethings: Austin	Eliminated	
1	Damian Powers	31	Love Is Blind 1	Eliminated	
1	Francesca Farago	30	Too Hot to Handle 1	Eliminated	
1	Diamond Jack	31	Love Is Blind 1	Eliminated	
1	Ines Tazi	26	The Circle France	Eliminated	
1	Mitchell Eason	23	The Circle 2	Eliminated	
1	Will Richardson	30	The Mole 6	Eliminated	
1	Colony Reeves	31	Selling Tampa	Eliminated	
1	Chase DeMoor	26	Too Hot to Handle 2	Eliminated	
1	Savannah Palacio	26	The Circle 2	Eliminated	
1	Anne-Sophie Petit-Frere	28	Selling Tampa	Eliminated	
1	Calvin Crooks	32	The Circle 3	Eliminated	
1	Zay Wilson	27	The Ultimatum: Marry or Move On 1	Eliminated	
2	Christine Obanor	27	Too Hot to Handle 5	Winner	
2	Nigel Jones	30	Too Hot to Handle 4	Winner	
2	Alara Taneri	24	Dated and Related	Finalist	
2	Bryton Constantin	23	Squid Game: The Challenge	Finalist	
2	Chris Hahn	28	Dated and Related	Finalist	
2	Elys Hutchinson	24	Too Hot to Handle 5	Finalist	
2	Kaz Bishop	31	Dated and Related	Finalist	
2	Micah Lussier	28	Love Is Blind 4	Finalist	
2	Stevan Ditter	29	Too Hot to Handle 3	Finalist	
2	Tolú Ekundare	26	The Trust: A Game of Greed	Finalist	
2	Izzy Zapata	32	Love Is Blind 5	Eliminated	
2	Jessica Vestal	29	Love Is Blind 6	Eliminated	
2	Harry Jowsey	27	Too Hot to Handle 1	Eliminated	
2	Justin Assada	26	Surviving Paradise	Eliminated	
2	Brittan Byrd	23	Too Hot to Handle 4	Eliminated	
2	Holly Scarfone	25	Too Hot to Handle 3	Eliminated	
2	Melinda Melrose	31	Too Hot to Handle 2	Eliminated	
2	Dom Gabriel	29	The Mole 6	Eliminated	
2	Jake Cunningham	29	The Ultimatum: Marry or Move On 1	Eliminated	
2	Dominique Defoe	24	Too Hot to Handle 4	Eliminated	
2	Xanthi Perdikomatis	25	The Circle 5	Eliminated	
2	Trevor Sova	31	Love Is Blind 6	—N/a	
3	Daniel Perfetto	28	Dated and Related	Winner	
3	Lucy Syed	29	Too Hot to Handle 6	Winner	
3	Amber Desiree "AD" Smith	34	Love Is Blind 6	Runner-up	
3	Ollie Sutherland	33	Love Is Blind: UK 1	Runner-up	
3	Freddie Powell	33	Love Is Blind: UK 1	Finalist	
3	Louis Russell	24	Too Hot to Handle 5	Finalist	
3	Madison Errichiello	28	Love Is Blind 8	Finalist	
3	Rachel Recchia	29	The Bachelor 26	Finalist	
3	Ray Gantt	29	Love Island USA 1	Finalist	
3	Sandy Gallagher	27	The Ultimatum: Marry or Move On 3	Finalist	
3	Carrington Rodriguez	27	Love Island USA 2	Eliminated	
3	J.R. Warren	33	The Ultimatum: Marry or Move On 3	Eliminated	
3	Juliette Porter	27	Siesta Key	Eliminated	
3	Scott van-der-Sluis	24	Love Island UK 10	Eliminated	
3	Jalen Olomu-Brown	27	Too Hot to Handle 6	Eliminated	
3	Justine Joy Ndiba	32	Love Island USA 2	Eliminated	
3	Olivia Rae	27	Temptation Island 9	Eliminated	
3	Clayton Echard	32	The Bachelorette 18	Eliminated	
3	Alex Zamora	27	Temptation Island 9	Eliminated	
3	Cody Wright	31	Temptation Island 9	Eliminated	
3	Hannah Burns	24	The Mole 7	—N/a	
3	Quori-Tyler "QT" Bullock	27	The Circle 6	—N/a	
4	Dave Hand	38	Married at First Sight Australia	Winner	
4	Sophie Willett	25	Love Is Blind UK 2	Winner	
4	Natalie Cruz	24	Temptation Island 9	Finalist	
4	DeMari Davis	29	Too Hot to Handle 6	Finalist	
4	Marissa George	34	Love Is Blind USA 7	Finalist	
4	Ally Lewber	30	Vanderpump Rules	Finalist	
4	Alison Ogden	25	Building the Band	Finalist	
4	Yamen Sanders	31	Love Island USA 1	Finalist	
4	Jimmy Sotos	29	Social media personality	Finalist	
4	Jimmy Presnell	30	Love Is Blind USA 6	Finalist	
4	Kayla Richart	25	Too Hot to Handle 4	Eliminated	
4	Weston Richey	25	Love Island USA 1	Eliminated	
4	Brianna Balram	25	Too Hot to Handle 6	Eliminated	
4	Hashim Moore	31	Temptation Island 9	Eliminated	
4	Mackenzie Bellows	25	Squid Game: The Challenge 2	Eliminated	
4	Kassy Castillo	25	Love Island USA 5	Eliminated	
4	Katherine LaPrell	30	Too Hot to Handle 6	Eliminated	
4	Chris Dahlan	27	Age of Attraction	Eliminated	
4	Nick Pellecchia	27	Million Dollar Secret 2	Eliminated	
4	Danny Spongberg	24	Temptation Island 9	—N/a	
