= List of Perfect Match (TV series) episodes =

The following is a list of episodes from Perfect Match, a dating reality television show produced by Kinetic Content that premiered on Netflix in February 2023. The series features contestants from other reality television shows by Netflix, MTV and ABC who pair up and compete in challenges.

== Series overview ==
Season	Contestants	Episodes	Originally released		Winners
Season	Contestants	Episodes	First released	Last released	Winners
1	23	12	February 14, 2023	February 28, 2023	Dom Gabriel & Georgia Hassarati
2	22	10	June 7, 2024	June 21, 2024	Christine Obanor & Nigel Jones
3	22	10	August 1, 2025	August 15, 2025	Daniel Perfetto & Lucy Syed
4	20	8	May 13, 2026	May 27, 2026	Dave Hand & Sophie Willett

== Episodes ==
=== Season 1 (2023) ===
No. overall	No. in season	Title	Original release date
1	1	"Love is the End Game"	February 14, 2023
2	2	"It's About the Chase"	February 14, 2023
3	3	"Strike a Match"	February 14, 2023
4	4	"Unfinished Business"	February 14, 2023
5	5	"Blind-Sided"	February 21, 2023
6	6	"Love is Savage"	February 21, 2023
7	7	"Circling Back"	February 21, 2023
8	8	"Mixes and Matches"	February 21, 2023
9	9	"Love It or Leave It"	February 28, 2023
10	10	"Making Waves"	February 28, 2023
11	11	"Back in the Mix"	February 28, 2023
12	12	"Game, Set, Perfect Match"	February 28, 2023

=== Season 2 (2024) ===
No. overall	No. in season	Title	Original release date
13	1	"Ready, Set, Match"	June 7, 2024
14	2	"Kiss and Tell"	June 7, 2024
15	3	"Chaos Theory"	June 7, 2024
16	4	"Truth Bombs"	June 7, 2024
17	5	"Shakeups & Breakups"	June 7, 2024
18	6	"Seeing Eye to Eye"	June 7, 2024
19	7	"Love Is Blindfolded"	June 14, 2024
20	8	"He Said, She Said"	June 14, 2024
21	9	"To Tell the Truth"	June 14, 2024
22	10	"Perfectly Ever After"	June 21, 2024

=== Season 3 (2025) ===
No. overall	No. in season	Title	Original release date
23	1	"Let's Puck"	August 1, 2025
24	2	"Good Vibrations"	August 1, 2025
25	3	"Lip Service"	August 1, 2025
26	4	"Ultimate Temptation"	August 1, 2025
27	5	"The Ex-Factor"	August 1, 2025
28	6	"Double Trouble"	August 1, 2025
29	7	"Thighs and Lies"	August 8, 2025
30	8	"Forgive Him or Forget Him"	August 8, 2025
31	9	"Split it or Quit it"	August 8, 2025
32	10	"Perfectly Matched"	August 15, 2025

=== Season 4 (2026) ===
No. overall	No. in season	Title	Original release date
33	1	"Bombshells & Love Bombs"	May 13, 2026
34	2	"A Tell of Two Jimmys"	May 13, 2026
35	3	"Wet and Wild"	May 13, 2026
36	4	"Baddies Come In Threes"	May 13, 2026
37	5	"Ex's and Woe's"	May 13, 2026
38	6	"Loose Lips Sink Relationships"	May 20, 2026
39	7	"Split Decision"	May 20, 2026
40	8	"Episode 8"	May 27, 2026
