= Battle Camp =

Netflix reality television series

- Presented by: Taylor Lewan
- Country of origin: United States
- Original language: English
- No. of seasons: 1
- No. of episodes: 10

Production
- Executive producers: Hannah Ganio; Rebecca McLaughlin; Louise Peet; Charlie Irwin; Ashley Whitehouse; Dolly Parton
- Running time: 45–59 minutes
- Production company: Thames Fremantle

Original release
- Network: Netflix
- Release: April 23, 2025 – present

Battle Camp is a reality competition television series produced by Thames Fremantle. It premiered on Netflix on April 23, 2025.

The series features contestants from other Netflix reality shows who team up and compete in challenges. As they compete for $250,000, only the most unbeatable, unbreakable, and unhateable will survive. The series is hosted by Taylor Lewan.

Battle Camp has received mixed reviews from critics.

== Format ==
Upon arrival, the players are divided into three teams: the Wolves, the Bears, and the Eagles. They try to keep their names off a spinning wheel. In each episode, the players' names can be added to the wheel by challenges, punishments, and votes.

=== Challenges ===
The teams compete against one another in challenges that test their mental and physical strength. In early episodes, the winning team receives immunity from the upcoming elimination. The losing team's members have their name put on the wheel.

In later episodes, the winning team does not get immunity.

=== Punishments ===
The winning team chooses three camp mates from their opposing teams to endure a punishment. The winner of said punishment keeps their name off the wheel, while the two others have their names added to it.

=== Voting and elimination ===
Before the elimination ceremony, all the players vote for which of their competitors they want to eliminate from the game. Each time players receive a vote, their name will appear on the wheel.

The wheel is then revealed to the players and spun. The player whose name it lands on gets eliminated. In the early episodes, eliminated players are replaced by reserve players who would take their place.

=== Final episode ===
In the final episode, players try to get their names on the wheel. Winners of the challenges and punishments get their names on the wheel, and they vote on who they want to win. The final wheel spin determines the winner of the game.

== Contestants ==
The cast of Battle Camp features eighteen Netflix reality stars from Cheer, The Circle, Love Is Blind, The Mole, Selling the OC, Squid Game: The Challenge, Too Hot To Handle, and The Ultimatum: Queer Love.

| Name | Age | Debut series | Episode Entered | Episode Exited | Team | | | Result |
|---|---|---|---|---|---|---|---|---|
| Lorenzo Nobilio | 28 | Squid Game: The Challenge 1 | 1 | 10 | Eagles | Eagles | Individual | Winner |
| Georgia Hassarati | 28 | Too Hot To Handle 3 | 1 | 10 | Eagles | Eagles | Individual | Co-runner-ups |
| Shubham Goel | 29 | The Circle 1 | 1 | 10 | Bears | Bears | Individual | Co-runner-ups |
| Chase DeMoor | 28 | Too Hot to Handle 2 | 5 | 10 | | Eagles | Individual | Co-runner-ups |
| Quori-Tyler "QT" Bullock | 26 | The Circle 6 | 1 | 10 | Bears | Bears | Individual | Co-runner-ups |
| Polly Brindle | 38 | Selling the OC | 2 | 10 | Eagles | Eagles | Individual | Co-runner-ups |
| Trey Plutnicki | 28 | Squid Game: The Challenge 1 | 1 | 10 | Wolves | Eagles | Individual | Eliminated |
| Nick Uhlenhuth | 31 | The Circle 3 | 4 | 9 | Eagles | Eagles | Individual | Eliminated |
| Kyle Fuller | 33 | The Circle 6 | 5 | 9 | | Bears | | Eliminated |
| Morgan Simianer | 27 | Cheer | 4 | 8 | Wolves | Bears | | Eliminated |
| Gio Helou | 37 | Selling the OC | 1 | 7 | Bears | Bears | | Eliminated |
| Avori Henderson | 28 | The Mole 6 | 1 | 7 | Bears | Bears | | Eliminated |
| Bri Balram | 27 | Too Hot to Handle 6 | 3 | 5 | Wolves | | | Eliminated |
| Louis Russel | 24 | Too Hot to Handle 6 | 1 | 5 | Wolves | | | Eliminated |
| Antonio "Tony" Castellanos | 25 | The Mole 7 | 1 | 4 | Eagles | | | Quit |
| Gabi Butler | 27 | Cheer | 1 | 4 | Wolves | | | Eliminated |
| Irina Solomonova | 28 | Love Is Blind 4 | 1 | 3 | Wolves | | | Eliminated |
| Lexi Goldberg | 29 | The Ultimatum: Queer Love 1 | 1 | 2 | Eagles | | | Eliminated |

=== Future appearances ===
In 2025, Quori-Tyler "QT" Bullock and Louis Russell appeared on the third season of Perfect Match.

In 2026, Chase DeMoor competed on the fourth series of Celebrity Ex on the Beach. Bri Balram appeared on season four of Perfect Match.

== Season summary ==
Battle Camp season summary
| Episode | | | The Challenge | | Punishment Nominations | Punishment Winner | Eliminated | |
| No. | Title | Air date | Winners | Losers | Punishment Nominations | Punishment Winner | Team | Player |
|---|---|---|---|---|---|---|---|---|
| 1 | "Welcome to Battle Camp!" | April 23, 2025 | Wolves | Eagles | Avori, Gio, Lexi | Avori | Eagles | Lexi |
| 2 | "Frozen Out" | April 23, 2025 | Bears | Wolves | Georgia, Irina, Lorenzo | Georgia | Wolves | Irina |
| 3 | "Blindsided" | April 23, 2025 | Bears | Wolves | Bri, Gabi, Polly | Gabi | Wolves | Gabi |
| 4 | "BeTreyed" | April 23, 2025 | Bears | Wolves | Morgan, Nick, Trey | Nick | Wolves | Louis |
| 4 | "BeTreyed" | April 23, 2025 | Bears | Wolves | Morgan, Nick, Trey | Nick | Wolves | Bri |
| 5 | "Draft Day" | April 23, 2025 | Eagles | Bears | —N/a | | —N/a | |
| 6 | "Battle of the Bears" | April 23, 2025 | Eagles | Bears | —N/a | | Bears | Avori |
| 6 | "Battle of the Bears" | April 23, 2025 | Eagles | Bears | —N/a | | Bears | Gio |
| 7 | "A Wolf in the Eagle's Nest" | April 23, 2025 | Eagles | Bears | Morgan; Kyle, QT | Kyle | Bears | Morgan |
| 8 | "Loose Lips Sinks Ships" | April 23, 2025 | Eagles | Bears | Kyle, QT, Shubham | Shubham | Bears | Kyle |
| 9 | "Fanning the Flames" | April 23, 2025 | Chase, Lorenzo, Polly | Georgia, Nick, QT, Shubham, Trey | Nick, Shubham, Trey | Trey | —N/a | Nick |
| 9 | "Fanning the Flames" | April 23, 2025 | Chase, Lorenzo, Polly | Georgia, Nick, QT, Shubham, Trey | Nick, Shubham, Trey | Trey | —N/a | Trey |
| 10 | "The Final Spin" | April 23, 2025 | Georgia, Lorenzo | —N/a | | Chase, Georgia | Chase, Georgia, Polly, QT, Shubham (Co-runner-ups) | |
| 10 | "The Final Spin" | April 23, 2025 | Georgia, Lorenzo | —N/a | | Chase, Georgia | Lorenzo (Winner) | |
| 10 | "The Final Spin" | April 23, 2025 | Chase, Polly, QT, Shubham | —N/a | | Chase, Georgia, Lorenzo, Shubham | Lorenzo (Winner) | |

== Voting progress ==
Color key:

Winner
Co-runner-up
Immune from elimination
Challenge Losers
Eliminated
Walked

| Episode | 1/2 | 2/3 | 3/4 | 4/5 (Note: This round was a double elimination. After the first contestant was eliminated, the wheel was spun a second time.) | 6/7 | 7/8 | 8/9 | 9/10 | 10 (Note: Players competed to have their names added to the final wheel.) | | |
|---|---|---|---|---|---|---|---|---|---|---|---|
| Challenge Winners | Wolves | Bears | Bears | Bears | Eagles | Eagles | Eagles | Chase, Lorenzo, Polly | Georgia, Lorenzo, Chase, Shubham | Chase, Polly, QT, Shubham | |
| Challenge Losers | Eagles | Wolves | Wolves | Wolves | Bears | Bears | Bears | Nick, Georgia, QT, Shubham, Trey | —N/a | | |
| Punishment Nominations | ~~Avori~~, Gio, Lexi | ~~Georgia~~, Irina, Lorenzo | Bri, ~~Gabi~~, Polly | Morgan, ~~Nick~~, Trey | —N/a | Morgan, ~~Kyle~~, QT | Kyle, QT, ~~Shubham~~ | Nick, Shubham, ~~Trey~~ | Chase, Georgia | Chase, Georgia, Lorenzo, Shubham | |
| Lorenzo | Avori | Irina (Note: This player lost the punishment and had their name added to the wheel.) | Louis | Morgan | Avori | Kyle | Kyle | Trey | Georgia | | Winner (Episode 10) |
| Chase | Not at Camp | | | | QT | Trey | Trey | Trey | Polly | | Co-runner-ups (Episode 10) |
| Georgia | Avori | Irina | Tony | Morgan | QT | Morgan | Kyle | Trey | Lorenzo | | Co-runner-ups (Episode 10) |
| Polly | Not at Camp | Irina | Louis | Louis | QT | Trey | Kyle | Nick | Chase | | Co-runner-ups (Episode 10) |
| QT | Lexi | Irina | Bri | Nick | Avori | Chase | Chase | Trey | Shubham | | Co-runner-ups (Episode 10) |
| Shubham | Lexi | Irina | Tony | Bri | Chase | Chase | Chase | Chase | QT | | Co-runner-ups (Episode 10) |
| Trey | Avori | Irina | Polly | Nick | Avori | Chase | Kyle | Nick | Eliminated (Episode 10) | | |
| Nick | Not at Camp | | | Louis | Avori | Trey | Kyle | Trey | Eliminated (Episode 9) | | |
| Kyle | Not at Camp | | | | Trey | Lorenzo | Trey | Eliminated (Episode 9) | | | |
| Morgan | Not at Camp | | | Nick | Chase | Georgia | Eliminated (Episode 8) | | | | |
| Gio | Lexi | Irina | Tony | Nick | Trey | Eliminated (Episode 7) | | | | | |
| Avori | Lexi | Irina | Bri | Nick | Trey | Eliminated (Episode 7) | | | | | |
| Bri | Not at Camp | | Polly | Nick | Eliminated (Episode 5) | | | | | | |
| Louis | Avori | Irina | Polly | Nick | Eliminated (Episode 5) | | | | | | |
| Tony | Lexi | Irina | Trey | Walked (Episode 4) | | | | | | | |
| Gabi | Avori | Irina | Tony | Eliminated (Episode 4) | | | | | | | |
| Irina | Avori | Tony | Eliminated (Episode 3) | | | | | | | | |
| Lexi | Avori | Eliminated (Episode 2) | | | | | | | | | |
| Names on Wheel | Avori, Gio, Georiga, Lexi, Lorenzo, Tony | Gabi, Irina, Lorenzo, Louis, Tony, Trey | Bri, Gabi, Louis, Polly, Tony, Trey | Bri, Louis, Morgan, Nick, Trey | Avori, Chase, Gio, Kyle, Morgan, QT, Shubham, Trey | Chase, Georgia, Kyle, Lorenzo, Morgan, QT, Shubham, Trey | Chase, Kyle, QT, Shubham, Trey | Chase, Georgia, Nick, QT, Shubham, Trey | Chase, Georgia, Lorenzo, Polly, QT, Shubham | | |
| Walked | none | | | Tony | none | | | | | | |
| Eliminated | Lexi; 7 of 18 names on Wheel | Irina; 13 of 18 names on Wheel | Gabi; 1 of 18 names on Wheel | Louis; 3 of 18 names on Wheel | Avori; 5 of 18 names on Wheel | Morgan; 3 of 16 names on Wheel | Kyle; 7 of 14 names on Wheel | Nick; 4 of 15 names on Wheel | Lorenzo; Winner | | |
| Eliminated | Lexi; 7 of 18 names on Wheel | Irina; 13 of 18 names on Wheel | Gabi; 1 of 18 names on Wheel | Bri; 2 of 15 names on Wheel | Gio; 1 of 13 names on Wheel | Morgan; 3 of 16 names on Wheel | Kyle; 7 of 14 names on Wheel | Trey; 6 of 11 names on Wheel | Chase, Georgia, Polly, QT, Shubham; Co-runner-ups | | |
