= Too Hot to Handle season 5 =

Too Hot to Handle
- Season 5
- Promotional poster
- No. of contestants: 14
- Winner: Elys Hutchinson
- Runner-up: Dre Woodard
- No. of episodes: 10

Release
- Original network: Netflix
- Original release: 14 July – 28 July 2023

Season chronology
- ← Previous; Season 4 Next → Season 6

The fifth season of Too Hot to Handle premiered on July 14, 2023, with half of the remaining episodes released on July 21, 2023, and the rest released on July 28, 2023. The season was ordered by Netflix in January 2023, and was filmed at the Emerald Pavilion in Turks and Caicos Islands.

== Cast ==
The initial cast of 10 was announced on June 29. Marziali and Rodgers were announced after they arrived during episode 4. Luu and Saltmarsh were announced after arriving on episode 7.

List of cast members participating or appearing in Too Hot to Handle (season 5)
Cast member	Age	Residence	Entered	Exited	Status	Ref
Elys Hutchinson	24	Lausanne, Switzerland	Episode 1	Episode 10	Winner	
Shedre "Dre" Woodard	21	Atlanta, Georgia	Episode 1	Episode 10	Runner-up	
Alex Snell	28	London, England	Episode 1	Episode 10	Finalist	
Bryce Saltmarsh	22	Gold Coast, Australia	Episode 7	Episode 10	Finalist	
Christine Obanor	26	Houston, Texas	Episode 1	Episode 10	Finalist	
Courtney Randolph	25	Houston, Texas	Episode 1	Episode 10	Finalist	
Hunter Voetsek	24	Arizona, U.S.	Episode 1	Episode 10	Finalist	
Linzy Luu	24	Honolulu, U.S.	Episode 7	Episode 10	Finalist	
Louis Russell	20	Hampshire, England	Episode 1	Episode 10	Finalist	
Megan Thomson	26	Cambridge, England	Episode 1	Episode 10	Finalist	
Trey Rodgers	22	Chicago, U.S.	Episode 4	Episode 10	Finalist	
Yazmin Marziali	25	Toronto, Canada	Episode 4	Episode 10	Finalist	
Hannah Brooke	24	Los Angeles, California	Episode 1	Episode 8	Eliminated	
Isaac Francis	24	Morristown, New Jersey	Episode 1	Episode 8	Eliminated	

=== Future appearances ===
In 2024, Christine Obanor and Elys Hutchinson appeared on the second season of Perfect Match. Louis Russell returned for season 6.

In 2025, Russell appeared on the first season of Battle Camp. Later that year, Russell appeared on season 3 of Perfect Match and Series 14 of Celebs Go Dating .

== Episodes ==
No. overall	No. in season	Title	Prize money	Original release date
40	1	"Up Ships Creek"	$200,000	14 July 2023
41	2	"A Matter of Pact"	$164,000	14 July 2023
42	3	"Stick or Twist"	$152,000	14 July 2023
43	4	"Court in the Act"	$146,000	14 July 2023
44	5	"Driving Me Bananas"	$98,000	21 July 2023
45	6	"Making Kiss-tory"	$110,000	21 July 2023
46	7	"Defective Detective"	$110,000	21 July 2023
47	8	"Is It Too Late to Say Sorry?"	$100,000	28 July 2023
48	9	"Love or Money"	$100,000	28 July 2023
49	10	"The Climax"	$100,000	28 July 2023

== After filming ==
Couples	Still together	Relationship notes
Elys Hutchinson & Alex Snell	No	Hutchinson & Snell were in a relationship at the end of the season. She revealed on the reunion that they had parted ways after six months.
Christine Obanor & Louis Russell	No	Obanor & Russell were coupled up at the end of the season. On the reunion, they revealed they broke up after getting home from filming.
Hannah Brooke & Isaac Francis	No	Brooke & Francis were a couple when they were eliminated on episode 8, but did not end up dating after being sent home in the villa.
