= Creed McKinnon =

Australian television personality and entrepreneur (born 1998)

Creed Gary Allan McKinnon (born 23 July 1998, in Margaret River, Western Australia) is an Australian television personality and entrepreneur, best known for his appearance on the fourth season of the reality series Too Hot to Handle on Netflix and for co-founding the cooking technology company Versaware. A graduate of North Idaho College and California Polytechnic State University, he also played intercollegiate men's soccer.
