= Too Hot to Handle season 6 =

Too Hot to Handle
- Season 6
- Promotional poster
- No. of contestants: 16
- Winners: Bri Balram; Demari Davis; Gianna Pettus
- Runners-up: Charlie Jeer; Katherine LaPrell; Chris Aalli; Lucy Syed
- No. of episodes: 10

Release
- Original network: Netflix
- Original release: 19 July – 2 August 2024

Season chronology
- ← Previous; Season 5

The sixth and final season of Too Hot to Handle premiered on July 19, 2024 and was filmed at Triton Villa, Turks and Caicos Islands. Half of the remaining episodes were released on July 26, 2024, and the remaining three were released on August 2, 2024.

For the first time, two couples were chosen to win the majority of the prize fund, and a single was chosen to win the rest of the prize fund. Bri Balram and Demari Davis were chosen to win $100,000 of the $125,000 prize fund over runners-up couple Charlie Jeer and Katherine LaPrell. Gianna Pettus was chosen as the winner of the remaining $25,000 over runners-up Chris Aalli and Lucy Syed, after not breaking a single rule all season.

== Cast ==
The initial cast of ten was announced on July 2. Flavia Laos Urbina from season 4, and Louis Russell from season 5 returned in episode 2.

List of cast members participating or appearing in Too Hot to Handle (season 6)
Cast member	Age	Residence	Entered	Exited	Status	Ref
Bri Balram	28	Atlanta, Georgia	Episode 1	Episode 10	Winner	
Demari Davis	27	Indiana, United States	Episode 1	Episode 10	Winner	
Gianna Pettus	20	Arkansas, United States	Episode 1	Episode 10	Winner	
Charlie Jeer	21	Kent, England	Episode 1	Episode 10	Runner-up	
Katherine LaPrell	28	Los Angeles, California	Episode 1	Episode 10	Runner-up	
Chris Aalli	24	Manchester, England	Episode 1	Episode 10	Runner-up	
Lucy Syed	28	London, England	Episode 1	Episode 10	Runner-up	
Cristian Lager	19	Chicago, Illinois	Episode 4	Episode 10	Finalist	
Flavia Laos Urbina	27	Lima, Peru	Episode 2	Episode 10	Finalist	
Jalen Olomu-Brown	26	Florida, United States	Episode 7	Episode 10	Finalist	
João Coronel	22	Porto Alegre, Brazil	Episode 1	Episode 10	Finalist	
Sabrina Zima	22	Grimsby, Ontario	Episode 7	Episode 10	Finalist	
Valentina Rueda Velez	23	Cali, Colombia	Episode 4	Episode 8	Quit	
Kylisha Jag	24	Toronto, Ontario	Episode 1	Episode 7	Eliminated	
Louis Russell	22	Hampshire, England	Episode 2	Episode 7	Eliminated	
Jordan Frank	21	San Clemente, California	Episode 1	Episode 3	Quit	

=== Future appearances ===
In 2025, Bri Balram and Louis Russell appeared on the first season of Battle Camp. Jalen Brown, Lucy Syed, and Russell appeared on season 3 of Perfect Match.

In 2026, Balram, DeMari Davis and Katherine LaPrell appeared on season four of Perfect Match.

== Episodes ==
No. overall	No. in season	Title	Prize money	Original release date
50	1	"Bad to the Cone"	$250,000	19 July 2024
51	2	"Paper Clips & Pay Per View"	$229,000	19 July 2024
52	3	"I'll Have What She's Having"	$199,000	19 July 2024
53	4	"Clocked Blocked"	$193,000	19 July 2024
54	5	"Demari's Demise"	$137,000	26 July 2024
55	6	"Womb for Improvement"	$131,000	26 July 2024
56	7	"A 99.7% Chance of Trouble"	$131,000	26 July 2024
57	8	"Sealed with a Chris"	$131,000	2 August 2024
58	9	"To Bri or Not to Bri"	$125,000	2 August 2024
59	10	"A Prize Surprise"	$125,000	2 August 2024

== After filming ==
Couples	Still together	Relationship notes
Bri Balram and Demari Davis	No	Balram and Davis left the retreat in a relationship. They are not officially together anymore, but are on good terms. Davis further "made it clear that they're not over," but are not officially in a relationship.
Charlie Jeer and Katherine LaPrell	No	Jeer and LaPrell coupled up halfway through the season and left together. They officially started dating after the season wrapped. They split in 2025 due to long distance.
Chris Aalli and Sabrina Zima	No	Aalli and Zima started a relationship shortly after her arrival. They remained coupled up for the rest of the season. Once returning from filming, they never established an exclusive relationship outside of the show.
