= Age of Attraction =

Netflix reality television series

- Created by: Jennifer O'Connell and Rebecca Quinn
- Presented by: Nick Viall and Natalie Joy
- Country of origin: United States
- Original language: English
- No. of seasons: 1
- No. of episodes: 8

Production
- Executive producers: Jennifer O’Connell; Rebecca Quinn; Sam Dean; David Friedman
- Production locations: Whistler and Vancouver, British Columbia, Canada
- Production company: Velvet Hammer

Original release
- Network: Netflix
- Release: March 11, 2026 – present

Age of Attraction is a reality dating television series created by Jennifer O'Connell and Rebecca Quinn, cofounders of Velvet Hammer Media. It premiered on Netflix on March 11, 2026.

The series features contestants dating based not on age, but compatibility. Similar to Love Is Blind, it has couples dating without knowing a key aspect of their potential partner. Instead of hiding appearances, Age of Attraction does not allow the contestants (or the viewers) to know each other's ages. It is hosted by Nick Viall and Natalie Joy, a couple with an 18-year age gap themselves.

On March 31, 2026, Netflix renewed the series for a second season.

So far, Age of Attraction has received mostly positive reviews from critics.

== Format ==
A group of 20 men and 20 women date without knowing each other's ages. The contestants couple up before going to the "Promise Room" where they exchange promise rings and reveal their ages. The couples then move in together to explore their relationships and meet close friends and families. At the end, they commit to their relationship or break up.

== Couples ==
There were 14 couples that went to the "Promise Room" but only 6 couples who had the potential for the most interesting journeys were selected. The production team selected both older men/younger women and older women/younger men couples.

Couple (Older first)	Age gap	Still together?	Notes
Theresa and John	27	No	John explained on a podcast they continued dating for 6 months, and then broke up.
Vanessa and Logan	20	Yes	
Derrick and Pfeifer	20	No	
Andrew and Libby	16	Yes	
Leah and Chris	15	No	Chris decided they should part instead of remaining together in the finale after some time reflecting on the pressure the age gap puts on them, especially surrounding kids.
Jorge and Vanelle	33	No	Broke up in Episode 5 after an altercation on the street that was not filmed. Vanelle was uncomfortable with the way it was handled.

== Contestants ==
Cast member	Age	Occupation	Hometown
Andrew	38	Bar owner	Baltimore, Maryland
Brian	48	Bakery owner	Madison, Wisconsin
Charles		IT specialist	Dallas, Texas
Chris	26	Public speaker and business owner	Miami, Florida
David E.		Broadcast analyist and MMA fighter	Wentzville, Missouri
David G.	39	Entrepreneur	Los Angele, California
Derrick	43	Medical sales	Dallas, Texas
Isaiah	26	Youth life coach	Syracuse, New York
Jaques		Specialty car scout	Amelia Island, Florida
John	27	Software sales	Miami, Florida
Jorge	60	Attorney	Los Angeles, California
Josh	46	Consultant	Austin, Texas
Justin G.		Insurance Agent	Tampa, Florida
Justin S.	44	Director in healthcare AI	Charleston, South Carolina
Len		Lawn irrigation company owner	Tulsa, Oklahoma
Logan	29	Corporate purchasing	Dallas, Texas
Sean		Sports performance coach	Indianapolis, Indiana
Tristan		Real estate investor	Atlanta, Georgia
West	30	Founder of a creative agency	San Diego, California
William		Entrepreneur	Miami, Florida
Angel		Founder and CEO of Angel Aesthetics	Denver, Colorado
Ashley		Business owner	Fishers, Indiana
Brenda		Salon owner	Los Angeles, California
Chloé		Sports reporter and marketing manager	Los Angeles, California
Elise	23	Model and actor	San Marcos, Texas
Erin		Massage therapist	Delavan, Wisconsin
Joleen	48	Teacher	Fremont, California
Katharine		Founder of luxury swimwear brand	New York, New York
Lauren	47	Entrepreneur	Los Angeles, California
Leah	41	Flight attendant	Los Angeles, California
Libby	22	Social media manager	San Diego, California
Lindey	24	Social media manager	Los Angeles, California
Michelle		Business owner	Redondo Beach, California
Pfeifer	23	Graphic designer	Seattle, Washington
Sophie		Marketing manager	Cincinnati, Ohio
Theresa	54	Stylist	Evanston, Illinois
Tiffany		Life coach	Charlotte, North Carolina
Vanelle	27	Project manager	Dallas, Texas
Vanessa	49	Salon owner	Canton, Ohio
Vickie	44	Dermatology pharmaceutical rep	Nashville, Tennessee

=== Future appearances ===
In 2026, Chris Dahlan appeared on season four of Perfect Match.
