= North Idaho College =

Community college in Coeur d'Alene, Idaho, US

- Former names: Coeur d'Alene Junior College (1933–1939); North Idaho Junior College (1939–1971)
- Motto: "Changing Lives Every Day"; On seal: Excellentia inter amoenitatem (Latin)
- Motto in English: "Excellence between charms"
- Type: Public community college
- Established: August 10, 1933; 93 years ago
- Parent institution: Idaho State Board of Education
- Accreditation: NWCCU
- Academic affiliations: Space-grant
- Chair: Brad Corkill
- President: Nick Swayne
- Administrative staff: 162
- Students: 4,652 (Fall 2025)
- Location: Coeur d'Alene, Idaho, U.S. 47°40′34″N 116°47′56″W
- Campus: 77 acres (0.31 km^{2}); Small city
- Other campuses: Bonners Ferry; Kellogg; Post Falls; Rathdrum; Sandpoint; St. Maries
- Newspaper: The Sentinel
- Colors: Maroon and gray
- Sporting affiliations: Scenic West
- Mascot: Cardinal
- Website: nic.edu

- Location within the United States Location within Idaho

North Idaho College (NIC) is a public community college in the northwest United States, located in Coeur d'Alene, Idaho. With an enrollment of approximately 4,652 undergraduate students, its main campus is situated at the north end of Lake Coeur d'Alene near downtown and Tubbs Hill, at the east bank of the outflowing Spokane River.

NIC is accredited by the Northwest Commission on Colleges and Universities but was placed on "show cause" status in early 2023 due to concerns about its board of trustees. It is one of four comprehensive community colleges in the state; the others are College of Eastern Idaho (Idaho Falls), College of Western Idaho (Nampa, Boise), and College of Southern Idaho (Twin Falls).

== History ==
The school was established during the Great Depression in 1933 as "Coeur d'Alene Junior College," with classes held at City Hall. It moved to its present campus in 1939, at the site of the old Fort Sherman (1878–1900), and the name was changed to "North Idaho Junior College"; the present name came in 1971.

== Board of trustees ==
The college's board of trustees has engaged in actions that have drawn national attention on multiple occasions.

In 2009, the college administration was censured by the American Association of University Professors.

In 2021, the board fired Rick MacLennan, the college president, without cause, later settling a lawsuit with him for nearly $500,000. Continued conflict among board members led to resignations of senior administrators at the college, hiring of the former wrestling coach as an interim president, the resignation of two trustees, the non-renewal of some of the college's insurance policies, and a warning from the college's accreditor.

In late 2022, the board placed the next college president, Nick Swayne, on administrative leave without explanation and hired a new attorney without education experience, an application or interview process; in March 2023, the college was ordered by a judge to reinstate Swayne. These actions and concerns about their legality and the college's stability led Moody's Investor Service to downgrade the college's bond rating and issue warnings from the college's accreditor, the Northwest Commission on Colleges and Universities (NWCCU). In February 2023, NWCCU placed the college on "show cause" status, giving it one month to convince the accreditor that the college should remain accredited. Against the advice of the administration, and counter to college policy, the board hired another attorney lacking education experience in November 2023. The college was subsequently given until October 2024 to demonstrate compliance with the accreditation standards.

As a result of the November 2024 elections, three new trustees were elected. The new board and college administration began correcting the problems created by the previous board. All 13 votes of no confidence lodged by staff, faculty, and students were formally rescinded by those bodies. Following college policy and the administration's recommendation, the trustees hired a professional legal team with actual experience in higher education law. The college presented evidence of these actions at the January 2025 meeting of the NWCCU. In its February report, the NWCCU recognized the professionalism and tremendous work done by the new board, resulting in a reduction of the sanction level from "show cause" to probation.

== Academics ==
North Idaho College offers associate degrees, including transfer degrees and the Associate of Applied Science degree.

== Catchment ==
Its catchment area includes all of the counties of Benewah, Bonner, Boundary, Kootenai, and Shoshone. Of them, solely Kootenai County is in the college's taxation zone.

== Notable alumni ==
- Braian Angola, professional basketball player in the Israeli Basketball Premier League
- Jason Bay, Major League Baseball outfielder
- Bryan Caraway, mixed martial artist (did not graduate)
- Barbara Ehardt (class of 1985), member of the Idaho House of Representatives and former college basketball coach
- Kelvin Gastelum (attended), mixed martial artist
- Gordon Herbert, professional basketball player and coach
- Rick Jore, former Montana State Representative
- Izzy Martinez, wrestling coach and COO of Real American Freestyle
- Creed McKinnon, Australian television personality and entrepreneur
- Sarah Palin, former Alaska Governor and 2008 vice presidential candidate, attended North Idaho College for one semester
- Steve Parker, National Football League player
- Trevor Prangley, college wrestler and mixed martial artist
- Josh Thomson, wrestler and mixed martial artist (did not graduate)
- James Webb III (born 1993), basketball player for Maccabi Tel Aviv in the Israeli Basketball Premier League
- Mike Whitehead, college wrestler and mixed martial artist (did not graduate)

== Gallery ==
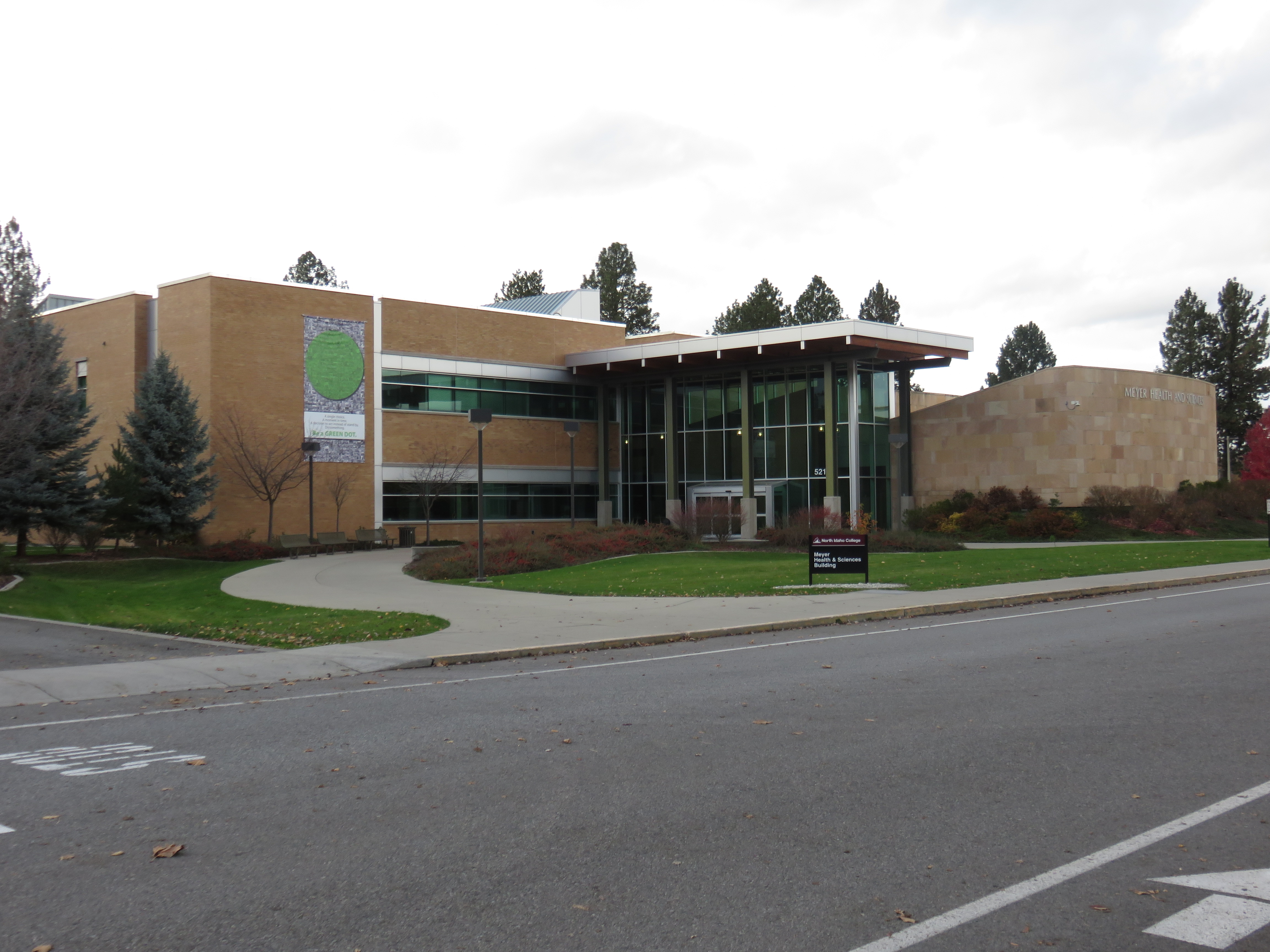
Meyer Health & Sciences Building

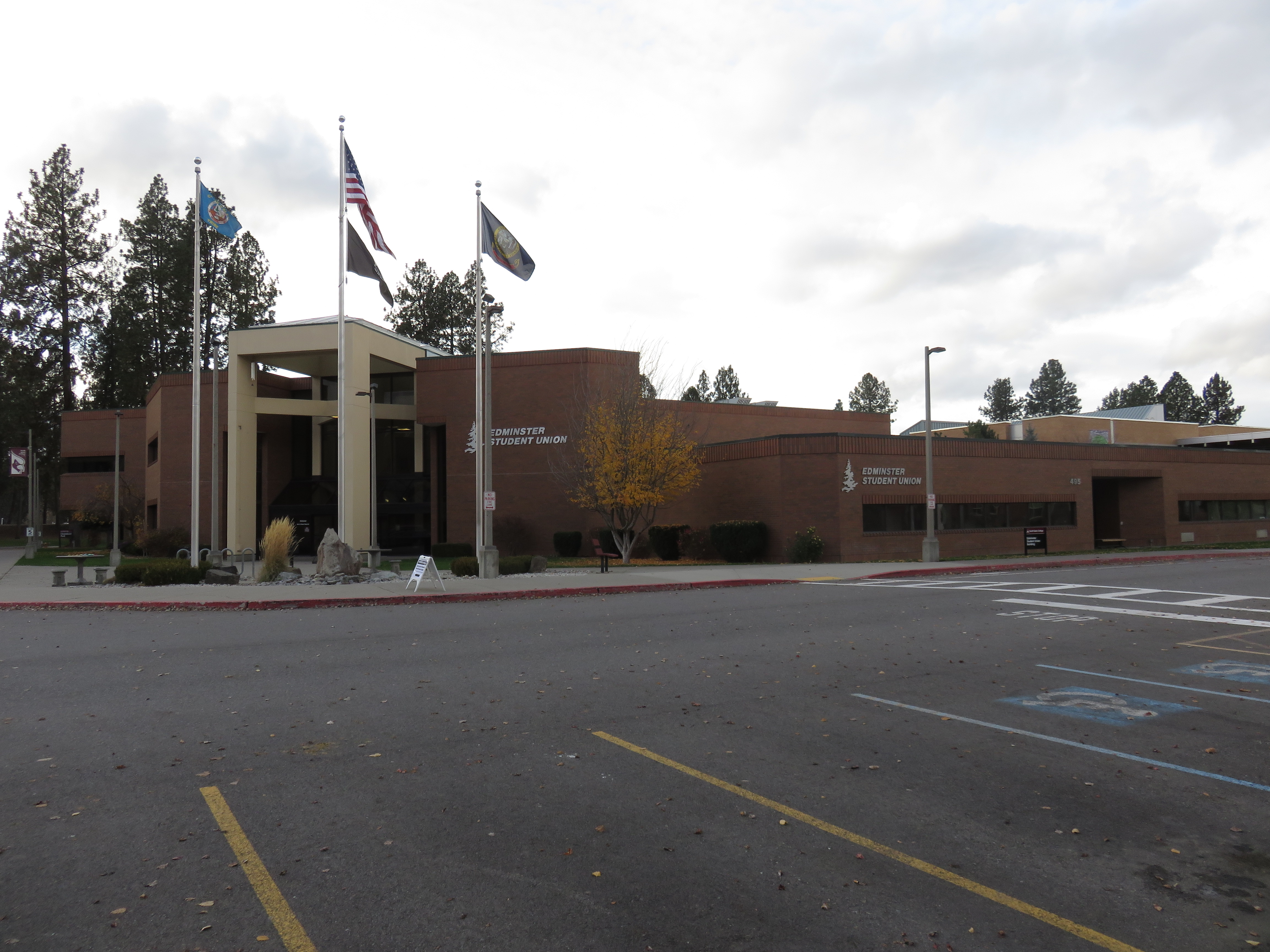
Edminster Student Union

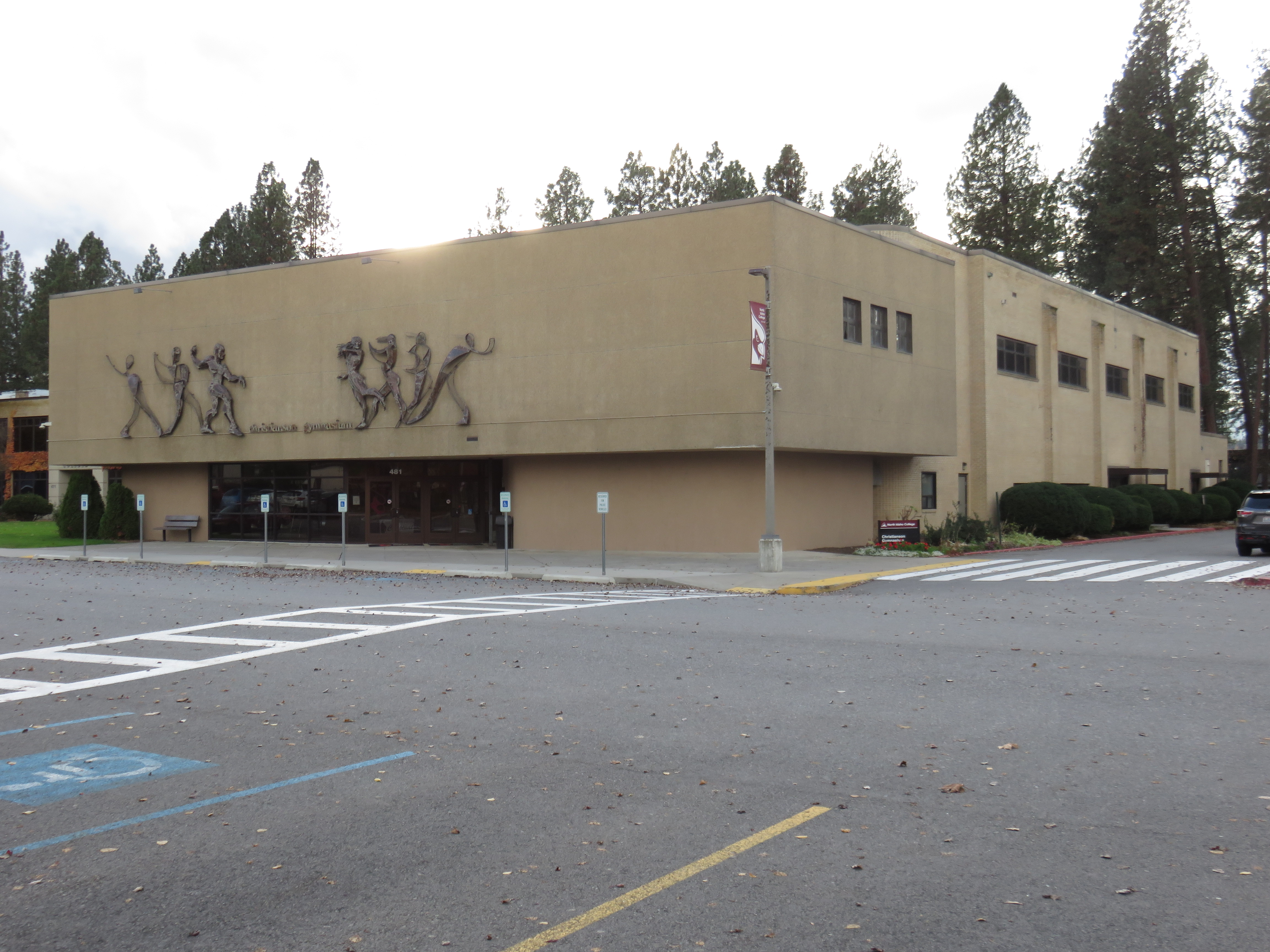
Christianson Gymnasium

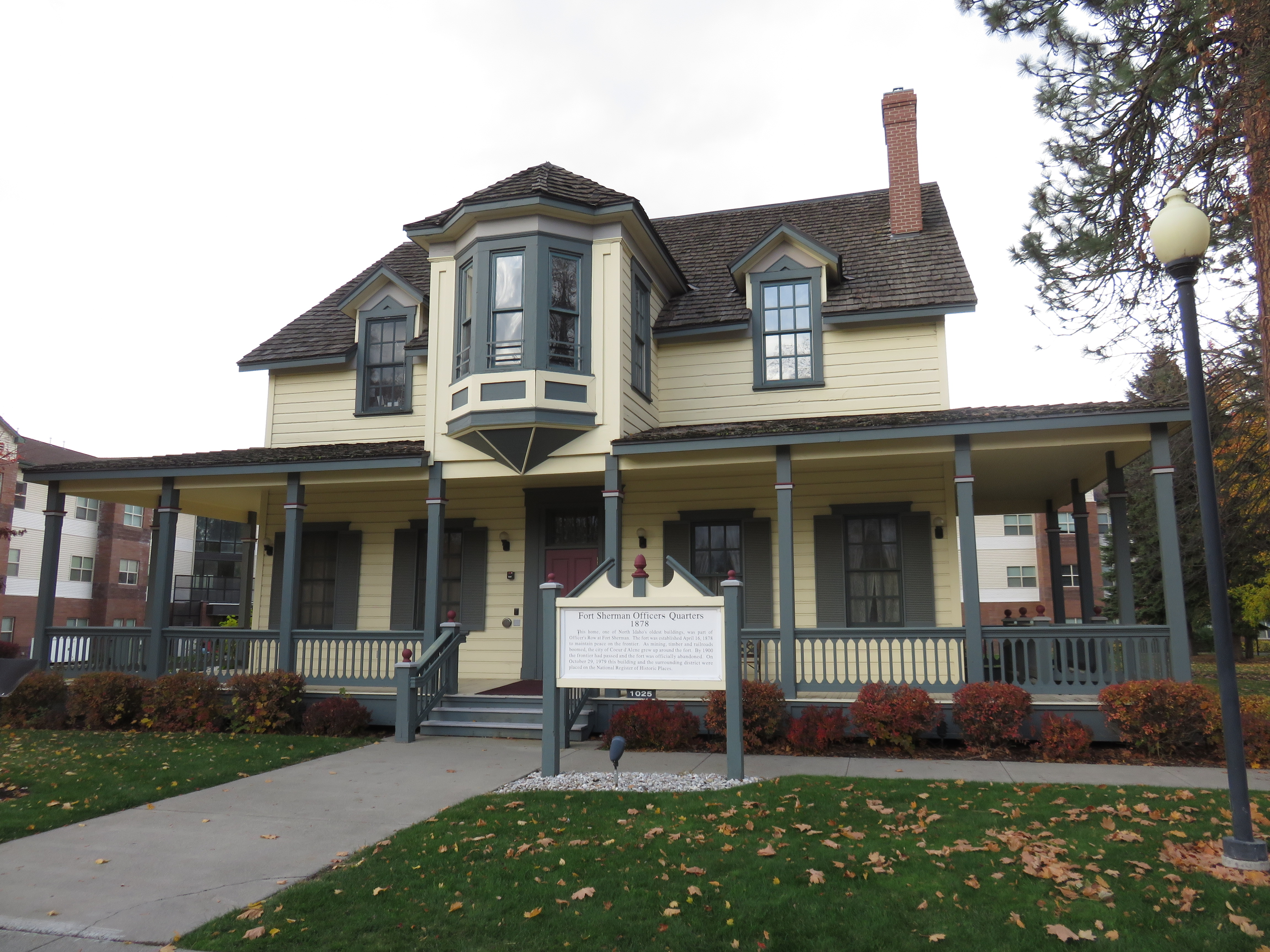
Historic Fort Sherman Officers Quarters
