= Too Hot to Handle season 4 =

Too Hot to Handle
- Season 4
- Promotional poster
- No. of contestants: 14
- Winners: Jawahir Khalifa; Nick Kici
- Runners-up: Kayla Richart; Seb Melrose
- No. of episodes: 10

Release
- Original network: Netflix
- Original release: 7 December – 14 December 2022

Season chronology
- ← Previous; Season 3 Next → Season 5

The fourth season of Too Hot to Handle premiered on December 7, 2022. The season was ordered by Netflix in February 2022, and was filmed at the Emerald Pavilion in Turks and Caicos Islands.

== Cast ==
List of cast members participating or appearing in Too Hot to Handle (season 4)
| Cast member | Age | Residence | Entered | Exited | Status | Refs |
|---|---|---|---|---|---|---|
| Jawahir Khalifa | 22 | Amsterdam, Netherlands | Episode 1 | Episode 10 | Winner | |
| Nick Kici | 28 | Michigan, U.S. | Episode 1 | Episode 10 | Winner | |
| Kayla Richart | 22 | Hobart, Tasmania, Australia. | Episode 1 | Episode 10 | Runner-up | |
| Seb Melrose | 24 | Glasgow, Scotland | Episode 1 | Episode 10 | Runner-up | |
| Brittan Byrd | 22 | Hawaii, U.S. | Episode 1 | Episode 10 | Finalist | |
| Dominique Defoe | 23 | Colorado, U.S. | Episode 1 | Episode 10 | Finalist | |
| Flavia Laos Urbina | 25 | Lima, Peru | Episode 4 | Episode 10 | Finalist | |
| Imogen Ewan | 24 | Sydney, Australia | Episode 7 | Episode 10 | Finalist | |
| James Pendergrass | 23 | Hawaii, U.S. | Episode 1 | Episode 10 | Finalist | |
| Nigel Jones | 29 | New Jersey, U.S. | Episode 1 | Episode 10 | Finalist | |
| Shawn Wells | 25 | Florida, U.S. | Episode 7 | Episode 10 | Finalist | |
| Creed McKinnon | 24 | Perth, Australia | Episode 1 | Episode 10 | Eliminated | |
| Sophie Stonehouse | 22 | Brighton, England | Episode 1 | Episode 8 | Eliminated | |
| Ethan Smith | 26 | Bristol, England | Episode 4 | Episode 8 | Eliminated | |

=== Future appearances ===
In 2024, Brittan Byrd, Dominique Defoe, and Nigel Jones appeared on the second season of Perfect Match. Flavia Laos Urbina returned in season 6.

In 2025, Jawahir Khalifa was a contestant on the 6th season of the Dutch reality competition Echte Meisjes in de Jungle.

In 2026, Kayla Richart appeared on season four of Perfect Match.

== Episodes ==
| No. overall | No. in season | Title | Prize money | Original release date |
|---|---|---|---|---|
| 30 | 1 | "The Mile Dry Club" | $200,000 | 7 December 2022 |
| 31 | 2 | "There's Something About Nigel" | $191,000 | 7 December 2022 |
| 32 | 3 | "Officer Kill Joy" | $167,000 | 7 December 2022 |
| 33 | 4 | "Flavia of the Month" | $167,000 | 7 December 2022 |
| 34 | 5 | "The Shower and the Glory" | $117,000 | 7 December 2022 |
| 35 | 6 | "Puppets for Playas" | $79,000 | 14 December 2022 |
| 36 | 7 | "Trust or Bust" | $89,000 | 14 December 2022 |
| 37 | 8 | "It's Raining Love Triangles" | $89,000 | 14 December 2022 |
| 38 | 9 | "Jawahir, Jawa-there" | $89,000 | 14 December 2022 |
| 39 | 10 | "Growth Is a Team Game" | $89,000 | 14 December 2022 |

== After filming ==
| Couples | Still together | Relationship notes |
|---|---|---|
| Jawahir Khalifa & Nick Kici | No | Khalifa & Kici started a relationship soon after the retreat started. They ended the season in a relationship and won as a couple. They revealed on the reunion they moved in together after filming, but broke up sometime later. |
| Kayla Richart & Seb Melrose | No | Richart & Melrose started their relationship at the start of the retreat and left in a relationship. They revealed on the reunion they dated for a few months, but they mutually decided to end their relationship due to long distance. They were still in communication and were both open to a relationship again. They got back together after the reunion was filmed and were together until mid 2024 when they broke up. |
| Brittan Byrd & James Pendergrass | No | Byrd & Pendergrass started a relationship at the beginning of the retreat. They faced their challenges, but got back together and ended the season in a relationship. On the reunion, they revealed they broke up after filming ended, but they eventually got back together for a short amount of time. |
