= Love Island USA season 1 =

2019 season of Love Island USA

Love Island USA
- Season 1
- Title card for the season
- Hosted by: Arielle Vandenberg
- No. of days: 30
- No. of contestants: 25
- Winners: Zac Mirabelli; Elizabeth Weber
- Runners-up: Dylan Curry; Alexandra Stewart
- No. of episodes: 22

Release
- Original network: CBS
- Original release: July 9 – August 7, 2019

Additional information
- Filming dates: July 7 – August 7, 2019

Season chronology
- Next → Season 2

The first season of the American version of the television reality program Love Island began airing on July 9, 2019, and concluded on August 7, 2019. The 22-episode series was broadcast on CBS in the United States and CTV in Canada. Arielle Vandenberg hosted the series while Matthew Hoffman provided voice-over narration. On August 7, 2019, having received the largest quantity of votes from the public, Elizabeth Weber and Zac Mirabelli were crowned the winners and split the $100,000 prize. Dylan Curry and Alexandra Stewart were named the runners-up.

The show's first season generally received mixed reviews from critics and its ratings were not as high as CBS's expectations. The series was renewed for a second season before the first had finished airing.

== Format ==
Love Island is a reality television program in which a group of contestants, who are referred to as "Islanders", are living in a villa in Fiji. The Islanders are cut off from the outside world and are under constant video surveillance. To survive in the villa, the Islanders must be in a relationship with another Islander. The Islanders couple up for the first time on first impressions but they are later forced to "re-couple" at special ceremonies in which they can choose to remain with their current partners or to switch partners. At the villa, the couples must share a bed for sleeping and are permitted to talk with other Islanders at any time, allowing them to get to know everyone. While in the villa, each Islander has his or her own telephone, with which they can contact other Islanders via text and can receive text messages informing them of the latest challenges, dumpings, and re-couplings. While the Islanders might appear to have unmediated access to the outside world, they are limited in both their alcohol consumption and communication with the outside world.

The Islanders are presented with many games and challenges that are designed to test their physical and mental abilities, after which the winners are sometimes presented with special prizes, such as a night at the Hideaway or a special date.

Islanders can be eliminated, or "dumped", for several reasons; these include remaining single after a re-coupling and by public vote through the Love Island mobile app. During the show's final week, members of the public vote to decide which couple should win the series; the couple who receive the most votes win.

At the envelope ceremony on finale night, the couple who received the highest number of votes from the public receive two envelopes, one for each partner. One envelope contains $100,000 and the other contains nothing. The partner with the $100,000 envelope may choose whether to share the money with his or her partner as a test of trust and commitment.

== Islanders ==
The final four couples on the first season of Love Island. Left to right: Dylan & Alexandra, Weston & Emily, Zac & Elizabeth, and Ray & Caro

On June 30, 2019, the initial Islanders were revealed. These Islanders entered the villa on July 7. All of the other Islanders were revealed as the series progressed. At the envelope ceremony, Elizabeth drew the envelope containing the $100,000 and decided to split the money with her partner, Zac.

Winston Hines previously appeared on season 20 of Big Brother.

Islander	Age	Residence	Entered	Exited	Status	Ref
Elizabeth Weber	24	Birmingham, Michigan	Day 1	Day 30	Winner	
Zac Mirabelli	22	Chicago, Illinois	Day 1	Day 30	Winner	
Alexandra Stewart	26	Chestnut Hill, Pennsylvania	Day 1	Day 30	Runner-up	
Dylan Curry	25	East Meadow, New York	Day 4	Day 30	Runner-up	
Caroline "Caro" Viehweg	21	Los Angeles, California (Note: Caroline Viehweg is originally from Germany but was residing in Los Angeles, California at the time of casting and filming.)	Day 1	Day 30	Third place	
Raymond "Ray" Gantt	23	Lakewood, New Jersey	Day 15	Day 30	Third place	
Emily Salch	21	Groton, New York	Day 21	Day 30	Fourth place	
Weston Richey	25	Dallas, Texas	Day 1	Day 30	Fourth place	
Kyra Green	22	Harlem, New York	Day 1	Day 27	Dumped	
Jered Youngblood	27	Lakeland, Florida	Day 21	Day 27	Dumped	
Aissata Diallo	25	Highbridge, New York	Day 15	Day 25	Dumped	
Yamen Sanders	24	Inglewood, California	Day 1	Day 25	Dumped	
Anton Morrow	23	Boiling Springs, Pennsylvania	Day 21	Day 23	Dumped	
Eric Hall	27	Toronto, Ontario	Day 15	Day 23	Dumped	
Kelsey Jurewicz	25	Newark, Delaware	Day 15	Day 23	Walked	
Katrina Dimaranan	26	San Juan, Philippines	Day 9	Day 20	Dumped	
Cashel Barnett	28	Sacramento, California	Day 1	Day 20	Dumped	
Winston Hines	29	Lexington, Kentucky	Day 11	Day 18	Dumped	
Marlisse "Marli" Tyndall	20	Miami, Florida	Day 15	Day 18	Dumped	
George Johnson	30	Beverly Hills, California	Day 15	Day 18	Dumped	
Christen McAllister	24	Louisville, Kentucky	Day 9	Day 13	Dumped	
Cormac Murphy	26	Ennis, Ireland	Day 4	Day 13	Dumped	
Alana Morrison	21	New Haven, Connecticut	Day 1	Day 11	Dumped	
Mallory Santic	26	Vancouver, Washington	Day 1	Day 11	Dumped	
Michael Yi	29	Miami, Florida	Day 1	Day 6	Dumped	

=== Future appearances ===
In 2021, Kyra Green appeared on the MTV dating series Match Me If You Can.

In 2022, Ray Gantt & Caro Viehweg competed as a team on The Amazing Race 33, prior to the suspension due to the COVID-19 pandemic and they did not return for the resumption of that season. Cormac Murphy briefly appeared on the 10th series of Celebs Go Dating. Gantt, Green, Emily Salch, and Viehweg appeared on the fifth season of MTV's Ex on the Beach. Cashel Barnett and Green competed on The Challenge: USA.

In 2023, Green and Gantt appeared on season one of Love Island Games.

In 2025, Yamen Sanders appeared on season 9 of Temptation Island. Green made a guest appearance on Love Island: Beyond the Villa. Gantt appeared on season three of Perfect Match.

In 2026, Sanders appeared on series three of Love Island: All Stars. Sanders also appeared season four of Perfect Match alongside Weston Richey.

== Coupling and elimination history ==
	Week 1			Week 2		Week 3			Week 4			Week 5	
	Day 1	Day 3	Day 6	Day 11	Day 13	Day 18		Day 20	Day 23	Day 25	Day 27	Final	
Elizabeth	Zac		Zac	Zac	Safe	Immune	Zac	Cashel & Katrina to dump	Zac	Safe	Finalist	Split the 100k	Winner (Day 30)
Zac	Elizabeth		Elizabeth	Elizabeth	Safe	Immune	Elizabeth	Cashel & Katrina to dump	Elizabeth	Safe	Finalist	Winner (Day 30)	
Alexandra	Michael		Dylan	Dylan	Safe	Immune	Dylan	Cashel & Katrina to dump	Dylan	Safe	Finalist	Runner-up (Day 30)	
Dylan	Not in Villa		Alexandra	Alexandra	Safe	Immune	Alexandra	Cashel & Katrina to dump	Alexandra	Safe	Finalist	Runner-up (Day 30)	
Caro	Cashel	Single	Cormac	Cormac	Vulnerable	Immune	Ray	Cashel & Katrina to dump	Ray	Safe	Finalist	Third Place (Day 30)	
Ray	Not in Villa					Vulnerable	Caro	Cashel & Katrina to dump	Caro	Safe	Finalist	Third Place (Day 30)	
Emily	Not in Villa								Weston	Safe	Finalist	Fourth Place (Day 30)	
Weston	Mallory		Mallory	Katrina	Safe	Immune	Kelsey	Cashel & Katrina to dump	Emily	Safe	Finalist	Fourth Place (Day 30)	
Jered	Not in Villa								Kyra	Safe	Eliminated	Dumped (Day 27)	
Kyra	Single	Cashel	Cashel	Cashel	Safe	Immune	Eric	Vulnerable	Jered	Safe	Eliminated	Dumped (Day 27)	
Aissata	Not in Villa					Vulnerable	Yamen	Vulnerable	Yamen	Eliminated	Dumped (Day 25)		
Yamen	Alana		Alana	Christen	Vulnerable	Immune	Aissata	Vulnerable	Aissata	Eliminated	Dumped (Day 25)		
Anton	Not in Villa								Single	Dumped (Day 23)			
Eric	Not in Villa					Safe	Kyra	Vulnerable	Single	Dumped (Day 23)			
Kelsey	Not in Villa					Safe	Weston	Cashel & Katrina to dump	Walked (Day 23)				
Cashel	Caro	Kyra	Kyra	Kyra	Safe	Immune	Katrina	Vulnerable	Dumped (Day 20)				
Katrina	Not in Villa			Weston	Safe	Immune	Cashel	Vulnerable	Dumped (Day 20)				
Winston	Not in Villa				Immune	Immune	Single	Dumped (Day 18)					
George	Not in Villa					Vulnerable	Dumped (Day 18)						
Marli	Not in Villa					Vulnerable	Dumped (Day 18)						
Christen	Not in Villa			Yamen	Vulnerable	Dumped (Day 13)							
Cormac	Not in Villa		Caro	Caro	Vulnerable	Dumped (Day 13)							
Alana	Yamen		Yamen	Single	Dumped (Day 11)								
Mallory	Weston		Weston	Single	Dumped (Day 11)								
Michael	Alexandra		Single	Dumped (Day 6)									
Notes	1		none		2	3	none	4	5	6	7	8	
Walked	none								Kelsey	none			
Dumped	No; Dumping		Michael; Failed to couple up	Alana, Mallory; Failed to couple up	Cormac; Islanders' choice to dump	George; Girls' choice to dump	Winston; Failed to couple up	Cashel & Katrina; 4 of 4 votes to dump	Anton, Eric; Failed to couple up	Aissata & Yamen; America's choice to dump	Jered & Kyra; America's choice to dump	Emily & Weston; Fewest votes to win	
Dumped	No; Dumping		Michael; Failed to couple up	Alana, Mallory; Failed to couple up	Cormac; Islanders' choice to dump	George; Girls' choice to dump	Winston; Failed to couple up	Cashel & Katrina; 4 of 4 votes to dump	Anton, Eric; Failed to couple up	Aissata & Yamen; America's choice to dump	Jered & Kyra; America's choice to dump	Caro & Ray; Third–most votes to win	
Dumped	No; Dumping		Michael; Failed to couple up	Alana, Mallory; Failed to couple up	Christen; Islanders' choice to dump	Marli; Boys' choice to dump	Winston; Failed to couple up	Cashel & Katrina; 4 of 4 votes to dump	Anton, Eric; Failed to couple up	Aissata & Yamen; America's choice to dump	Jered & Kyra; America's choice to dump	Alexandra & Dylan; Second–most votes to win	
Dumped	No; Dumping		Michael; Failed to couple up	Alana, Mallory; Failed to couple up	Christen; Islanders' choice to dump	Marli; Boys' choice to dump	Winston; Failed to couple up	Cashel & Katrina; 4 of 4 votes to dump	Anton, Eric; Failed to couple up	Aissata & Yamen; America's choice to dump	Jered & Kyra; America's choice to dump	Elizabeth & Zac; Most votes to win	

=== Notes ===
- ^Note 1: Kyra entered after the initial coupling and was told that after twenty-four hours she'd be allowed to steal a guy from another girl.
- ^Note 2: America voted for the most compatible couple on the island. The two couples with the fewest votes would be up for the dump. The saved Islanders then had to collectively choose one person from each couple to keep on the island. The Islanders chose to save Caro and Yamen, meaning that Christen and Cormac were dumped from Love Island. Following the dumping, Caro and Yamen became single. Winston, as a new Islander who arrived after the most-recent re-coupling, was immune from this dumping.
- ^Note 3: America voted for their favorite new boy and girl to save from dumping. America saved Eric and Kelsey, leaving Aissata, Ray, Marli, George vulnerable to being dumped. Then, the guys had to collectively choose to save either Aissata or Marli and the girls collectively chose to save either Ray or George. Aissata and Ray were saved, meaning that Marli and George were dumped from Love Island.
- ^Note 4: America voted for their favorite couple to save from dumping. Cashel & Katrina, Aissata & Yamen and Eric & Kyra received the fewest votes and were up for the dump. The saved Islanders had to publicly vote to dump one of the vulnerable couples, with each saved couple casting one vote. Cashel & Katrina received all 4 votes and were dumped from Love Island.
- ^Note 5: Kelsey walked during the re-coupling ceremony, meaning she decided to not couple up with anyone.
- ^Note 6: America voted for their favorite couple. The couple that received the fewest votes was dumped from Love Island.
- ^Note 7: America voted for the couple they wanted in the Finale of Love Island. When the votes were revealed the couples with the most votes were declared as finalists while the couple with the fewest votes was dumped.
- ^Note 8: Viewers voted for which couple they thought should win Love Island. The couple with the most votes were declared the winners of Love Island and received the grand prize money.

== Episodes ==
No. overall	No. in season	Title	Day(s)	Original release date	Prod. code	US viewers (millions)	Rating/share (18–49)
Week 1
1	1	"Episode 1"	Days 1–2	July 9, 2019	101	2.61	0.6/3
The first five women enter the villa and the first coupling ceremony starts, creating the first couples of Love Island. After they enter the villa, the five men picks which woman they want to be paired with. To help the men chose, the women step forward if they feel an attraction. Cashel picks Caro, Yamen picks Alana, Zac picks Elizabeth, Weston picks Mallory, and Michael picks Alexandra. Immediately after, Kyra enters the villa; she is told that in 24 hours, she can steal one of the men. After the couples are created, the Islanders are able to mingle until they eventually go to bed. On Day 2, Kyra tries to make connections with the men; she tells the women she feels attracted to Weston, Yamen, and Cashel. That night, Kyra receives a text announcing it is time for her to pick her partner. The episode finishes on a cliffhanger.
2	2	"Episode 2"	Days 2–3	July 10, 2019	102	2.59	0.6/4
At the re-coupling, Kyra picks Cashel, leaving Caro single. After receiving a text, it is revealed that at the end of the week, someone will be left single and will be "dumped" or eliminated from Love Island. It is also revealed that Kyra and Cashel will immediately go on their first date because they are the newest couple. That night, after Kyra and Cashel return from the date, Caro isolates herself from the rest of the Islanders.: Game ("Excess Baggage"): In a game pitting the men against the women, a piece of luggage comes down and lands on one of the Islanders' names. The Islander whose name the luggage landed on must open the suitcase and read a secret. If the Islanders can guess whose secret it is, they earn a point. The women and the men teams tie with two points each but there was no prize.; On Night 3, it is revealed to viewers that America can vote on which two women the two new Islanders, Cormac and Dylan, should go on dates with.
3	3	"Episode 3"	Days 3–5	July 11, 2019	103	2.51	0.6/4
On Day 4, Cormac and Dylan enter the villa. Cormac tell Caro he was initially attracted to her but says in his confessional he is attracted to all of them. Dylan feels closer to Alexandra than anyone else. America decides Dylan should go on a date with Alexandra and Cormac should go on a date with Caro. After their dates, both men get a text telling them to choose another woman to go on a date with. Dylan chooses to go on a date with Mallory and Cormac chooses Elizabeth; however, the episode is left on a cliffhanger.
4	4	"Episode 4"	Days 5–6	July 12, 2019	104	2.03	0.4/3
Dylan and Mallory, along with Cormac and Elizabeth, go on their dates. Caro and Alexandra starts discussing their dates at the villa.: Game ("Going Commando"): One at a time, the men complete an obstacle course dubbed the "commando course" in what they believed is the sexiest way possible. The women decide which man is the sexiest. Michael wins the challenge but there is no prize.; On Day 6, Caro receives a text informing the Islanders of the re-coupling that night. All of the women must choose one man. The man not chosen will become the first Islander to be dumped. At the re-coupling, Kyra picks Cashel, Elizabeth picks Zac, Alana picks Yamen, Mallory picks Weston, Alexandra picks Dylan, and Caro picks Cormac. At the end of the re-coupling, Michael remains single and is dumped.
Week 2
5	5	"Episode 5"	Days 6–9	July 15, 2019	105	1.98	0.5/3
Mallory and Weston decide it will be best if they just stay friends.: Game ("Float My Boat"): The women are blindfolded and are instructed by their coupling partners. The women must inflate rafts with a pump. Then as a duo, they must row their raft around a pink, inflatable duck in the ocean and return to the shore. The first couple to return to the shore wins a prize. Alexandra and Dylan win a night at the Hideaway.; The men prank the women with a fake text from Love Island, which is delivered by Weston as part of his birthday. This leaves Mallory and a few other women angry at Weston for pranking them. As the Islanders celebrate Weston's birthday that night, Weston receives a text informing the Islanders two new women, Christen and Katrina, will be entering the villa.
6	6	"Episode 6"	Days 9–10	July 16, 2019	106	2.25	0.5/3
After the new women, Christen and Katrina, enter the villa, the Islanders play a game in which they must keep a card on their lips using suction. On the card is a dare. When an Islander drops a card, he or she must perform the dare. This is an informal game that was not pre-planned. On Day 10, Katrina and Christen are informed they will be speed dating all of the men. Each date lasts only two minutes. The other women are able to watch the dates, although they are unable to hear what is said. That night, Katrina and Christen each have to send one woman to the Hideaway and they will be able to share a bed with that woman's current partner. Katrina chooses Weston and Christen chooses Yamen. The episode is left on a cliffhanger. During the credits, it is revealed that Big Brother alum Winston Hines will be entering the villa.
7	7	"Episode 7"	Days 10–11	July 17, 2019	107	2.40	0.5/3
Mallory and Alana go to spend the night in the Hideaway after Christen and Katrina choose to spend the night with Weston and Yamen. That night Christen and Weston, along with Katrina and Yamen, go on a date. The next morning, Weston receives a text saying there will be a re-coupling in which the men can pick which woman they want to be coupled with. The two women who are not chosen will be at risk of being dumped.: Game ("Girl Power"): The women have to kick cardboard cutouts of villains to "save" the man they are coupled with. Christen and Katrina, who are not coupled up, pick the man they want to be with. Christen picks Yamen and Katrina picks Weston. The men can vote on which woman completed the course the best. Alana wins with a unanimous vote but there was no prize.; At the re-coupling, Dylan picks Alexandra, Zac picks Elizabeth, Cormac picks Caro, Cashel picks Kyra, Weston picks Katrina, and Yamen picks Christen. Alana and Mallory, who have remained single, are immediately dumped. After the re-coupling, Kyra receives a text from Winston, the newest man, inviting her on a date. The episode is left on a cliffhanger.
8	8	"Episode 8"	Days 11–12	July 18, 2019	108	2.25	0.5/3
Before Kyra goes on the date, she discussed with the women about how she and Cashel are not connecting. After the date, Kyra goes to Cashel in order to work things out. On Day 12, Winston gets to have one meal with three women. Winston meets with Katrina for the starter, Alexandra for the main course, and Caro for the dessert.: Game ("Hearts on Fire"): The women wear heart rate monitors and watch the men's performances to see which one will raise their heart rates the most. After all of the men go, the women perform for the men. There is no prize for this game.; It was revealed to America that voting for the most compatible couple has opened. The couple with the fewest votes will be at risk of being dumped in the next episode.
9	9	"Episode 9"	Day 12–13	July 19, 2019	109	2.16	0.5/4
Cracks start forming in relationships between Kyra and Cashel, Caro and Cormac, and Christen and Yamen; however, some relationships strengthen in Alexandra and Dylan and Elizabeth and Zac.: Game ("Fast Food"): Winston replaces Weston in this game due to Weston feeling ill. They have to pass items of food along a course using only their mouths. Cashel and Kyra win but there was no prize.; At the elimination, it is announced that the couple with the fewest votes from the public will be dumped. The safe couples are Alexandra and Dylan, Katrina and Weston, Elizabeth and Zac, and Kyra and Cashel. This leaves Caro, Cormac, Christen, and Yamen vulnerable. The four safe couples are told to vote two Islanders out; one Islander from each vulnerable couple. They vote out Cormac and Christen, who are dumped. Caro and Yamen became single. At the end of the episode, it is revealed that several new Islanders will be entering the villa.
Week 3
10	10	"Episode 10"	Days 13–15	July 22, 2019	110	1.88	0.4/3
Kyra tells Cashel she wants them to split up. Cashel, in his confessional, labels himself unofficially single. Zac asks Elizabeth to be his girlfriend after he devises and executes a scavenger hunt for her. On Day 15, Alexandra gets a text saying the women will be spending the day away from the men. That day, six new Islanders; Ray, Eric, George, Kelsey, Marli, and Aissata, enter the villa. The men are able to meet the three new women and the women met the three new men. During the night, the seventeen Islanders get together and talk about their conversations and thoughts on the new Islanders.
11	11	"Episode 11"	Day 15	July 23, 2019	111	2.14	0.4/3
On Day 15, George receives a text telling the Islanders Eric, George, and Ray have to choose a woman with whom to go on a date. Eric chooses Caro, George chooses Aissata, and Ray chooses Katrina. Immediately after, Marli receives the same text asking the new women to pick a man with whom to go on a date. Marli chooses Winston, Kelsey chooses Weston, and Aissata chooses Yamen. It is revealed America will be able to vote to save one new male and one new female Islander. The new Islanders with the fewest votes will be at risk of being dumped.
12	12	"Episode 12"	Days 15–18	July 24, 2019	112	2.24	0.5/3
On Day 17, Zac and Elizabeth go on their first date. The next day at the elimination, the two new Islanders who garner the most votes are, Eric and Kelsey, who became immune. The four remaining Islanders; Aissata, Ray, Marli, and George, became vulnerable. The safe men have to dump either Aissata or Marli, and the safe women have to dump either Ray or George. The men decide to dump Marli, and the women decide to dump George.
13	13	"Episode 13"	Day 18	July 25, 2019	113	2.18	0.5/3
On Day 18, the Islanders are informed there will be a re-coupling. At the re-coupling, Winston remains single and is dumped from Love Island.: Game ("Social Bingo"): Caro feels ill and sits out of this game. Tweets about the Islanders are read to them but the Islanders' names are blanked; they must decide which name has been blanked. After each couple gives their guess, the Islander's name will be revealed behind a bingo space. There is no prize for this game.; It is announced that America will be able to vote for their favorite couple. The couple with the fewest votes will be at risk of being dumped.
14	14	"Episode 14"	Days 18–20	July 26, 2019	114	1.97	0.3/3
On Day 20, Kelsey and Weston go on their first date as a couple. At the elimination, it is revealed the bottom three couples based on America's vote will be vulnerable to dumping. The safe couples are Weston and Kelsey, Ray and Caro, Dylan and Alexandra, and Elizabeth and Zac. The safe couples are then told to vote for the couple they want to dump. By a unanimous vote, Cashel and Katrina are dumped.
Week 4
15	15	"Episode 15"	Days 20–22	July 29, 2019	115	2.05	0.4/2
On Day 21, Anton, Emily, and Jered enter the villa during a fake game in which the Islanders are blindfolded and have to find their partners, but the game is intended to introduce the three new Islanders. During a football-themed party that night, the Islanders play an unofficial game in which they throw a football into a large party cup. Each party cup has a name attached to it; if the football lands in the cup, that Islander must perform a dare. During the game, Emily and Kyra kiss and start feeling an attraction.
16	16	"Episode 16"	Days 22–24	July 30, 2019	116	1.91	0.4/2
On Day 22, Emily goes on a date with Eric. After the date, Emily sends a text to Weston inviting him on a date. Jered goes on a date with Kyra, and Anton goes on a date with Caro. On Day 24, Aissata receives a text informing the Islanders of the re-coupling that night. Before the re-coupling, Emily and Kyra come out to each other as bisexual. Emily is debating over picking Weston, Eric, or Kyra. Weston cannot decide between Katrina, Kelsey, and Kyra. The episode is left on a cliffhanger, reserving the re-coupling for next episode.
17	17	"Episode 17"	Days 23–24	July 31, 2019	117	2.38	0.5/3
At the re-coupling, the women have to pick which man they want to couple up with. Halfway through the re-coupling, Kelsey decides to quit Love Island. Caro chooses Ray, Elizabeth chooses Zac, Aissata chooses Yamen, Alexandra chooses Dylan, Emily chooses Weston, and Kyra chooses Jered. Eric and Anton, after remaining single, are dumped. After the re-coupling, Dylan gets a text saying the Hideaway is open. Caro and Ray spent the night in the Hideaway.: Game ("Dunk in Love"): One at a time, couples sit above a pool of water. They are asked questions about their partners. If they get the question right, they are safe but if they get the question wrong, they are dunked. There is no prize for this game.; On Day 24, Alexandra and Dylan go on a date. That night, Kyra and Emily talk about their feelings for each other and how they connected before the re-coupling and how they wish they had talked to each other sooner. It is revealed that America will be able to vote for its favorite couple.
18	18	"Episode 18"	Days 24–25	August 1, 2019	118	2.26	0.5/3
On Day 25, the women discuss how Weston keeps switching to "the next best thing" every time there is a re-coupling. Ray gets a text telling the men to head to a market to buy groceries. Emily talks with Weston after he returns and starts talking about how he is a "player". The women overhear the conversation and made comments supporting Emily.: Game ("Polls Apart"): Islanders are given a category such as "most intelligent couple". The Islanders have to decide which couples deserve a first, second, and third-place ranking based on the category. America's answer as to who it perceives to be first, second, and third is announced. There is no prize for this game.; During a confrontation between Emily and Weston, Weston denies being a "fake and non-genuine" man. On Day 25, there is an elimination. America's voting determines which couples will be safe. The couple who receives the fewest votes will be dumped. The episode ends on a cliffhanger after Aissata, Yamen, Emily, and Weston are still vulnerable.
19	19	"Episode 19"	Days 25–27	August 2, 2019	119	1.92	0.3/3
It was revealed that Aissata and Yamen receives the fewest votes and they are dumped. That morning, Islanders are awoken by the sound of a crying baby. After investigating, they realize each couple has to take responsibility for a baby. They earn points with a happy baby and are penalized when the baby is sad. Kyra gets a text informing the women they will be getting drinks at a location outside of the villa, leaving the men to take care of the babies. At the end of the day when the results are revealed, Ray and Caro earned the most points. Since more than half of them are good with their babies, they are awarded a party that night. On Day 26, it is revealed via text that it would be another couple's last night in the villa. It is revealed to America that voting for which couple it wants in the finale has opened.
Week 5
20	20	"Episode 20"	Days 27–28	August 5, 2019	120	2.00	0.4/2
Game ("Bound by Love"): Couples have to work together to build a shoe rack but they cannot use one of their hands because they are handcuffed. Then, the couples have to decorate a cake but the women are blindfolded and have to be directed by their partners. After the group have discussed who has won, Dylan and Alexandra are announced as the winners. There is no prize for this game.; On Day 27, at the elimination, only four couples can advance to the finale; these are Ray and Caro, Zac and Elizabeth, Dylan and Alexandra, and Emily and Weston. Kyra and Jered had failed to advance and are dumped. After Kyra is dumped, she receives a video message from Cashel, whom she wanted to see after the show. Outside the villa, Cashel surprises Kyra by flying back to Fiji to see her. The next day, Alexandra, Dylan, Zac, and Elizabeth receives a text informing each of them of their final dates.
21	21	"Episode 21"	Days 28–29	August 6, 2019	121	1.95	0.4/3
During the night of Day 28, Caro and Ray, Emily, and Weston go on their dates. On Day 29, Weston receives a text informing the Islanders their families will be visiting the villa. The couples can meet their partners' families. It was revealed to America that voting for the couple it wants to win Love Island is open.
22	22	"Episode 22"	Day 30	August 7, 2019	122	2.54	0.5/3
On Day 30, the last four couples have brunch. Emily gets a text telling the women they had to leave the villa to get ready for the finale that night. While the women are gone, Ray gets a text telling the men to write a "declaration of love" they will read to their partners that night. The women get a similar text. After they write their letters, the men choose their suits for the event. That night, the couples share their declarations with each other. After Vandenberg arrives, each couple recaps their journey to finale night. After the recaps, the winners are revealed to be Zac and Elizabeth. At the envelope ceremony, Zac and Elizabeth each take an envelope, one of which contain the $100,000 prize and the other contains nothing. Elizabeth chooses the prize envelope and decides to share the money with Zac.

== Production ==
=== Development ===
On February 22, 2006, it was announced an American version of Celebrity Love Island was in development at My Network TV but the program was never produced. On August 8, 2018, it was reported CBS had acquired from ITV Studios and Motion Content Group the rights to produce an American non-celebrity version of the show with David George, Adam Sher, and David Eilenberg serving as executive producers. Simon Thomas, Mandy Morris, Ben Thursby, Richard Foster, and Chet Fenster later joined the series as executive producers in addition to the original three. It was also announced Arielle Vandenberg would be hosting the series. Matthew Hoffman was selected as the narrator for the series; his narrative style involved leveling sarcastic comments at the contestants in voice-overs. CBS budgeted $30 million to produce the season.

On August 1, 2019, CBS renewed the series for a second season.

=== Filming ===
Filming started on July 7, 2019, two days before the Islanders entered the villa. Filming took 30 days and ended on August 6 during the finale. Rather than using a villa on the Spanish Balearic island of Mallorca as the UK series does, the American Love Island is filmed in a custom-built villa on an island in Fiji. Series producers chose Fiji as a location because "it 'meant something to Americans' and 'feels like a place you would want to come and fall in love'." Filming took place at the Villa Takali in Fiji.

==== Villa ====
The Love Island villa at night

The villa features a two-story house in which the Islanders live; it has a communal bedroom and an outdoor kitchen downstairs. The outdoor area has a pool, hot tub, gymnasium, outdoor bar, shower, and lounge areas, and also a fire pit where most re-couplings take place. There are seven queen-sized beds in the communal bedroom, which the couples share throughout the season. The second floor of the villa has a bathroom containing an infinity bathtub, dressing area, balcony, and a toilet, which the Islanders shared. Also upstairs is a room with four vanities and a balcony where the women could get ready. Areas of the villa, including its garden, collectively contain 3,000 locally sourced plants. Over a mile of neon lights are strung around parts of the villa.

The Hideaway, designed by Jonathan Adler, is a secluded bedroom and outdoor area. Couples could earn the privilege of spending a night at the Hideaway by winning one of the games that are regularly played in the villa during the season.

=== Broadcast ===
The series opened with a 90-minute premiere on July 9, 2019. From July 9 to August 7, 2019, 22 episodes were aired, each lasting around 60 minutes. The series was simulcast on CTV in Canada. On Saturday, July 27, 2019, American television channel Pop broadcast a 14-hour marathon of the first fourteen episodes of the series.

=== Prize ===
As part of the Love Island format, after the winning couple was announced, they were presented with two envelopes, one of which contained the $100,000 prize; the other envelope contained nothing. They both chose an envelope and announced what was inside. The Islander who chose the envelope containing the prize money decided whether to share the money with the partner or take it all.

=== Reunion ===
On October 17, 2019, starting at 7 p.m. Pacific Daylight Time, the contestants of the first series of Love Island, including host Arielle Vandenberg and narrator Matthew Hoffman, attended a reunion party. The reunion would have been the first time the entire cast of the series was together but Mallory Santic, Cormac Murphy, Marli Tyndall, Winston Hines, Kelsey Jurewicz, and Anton Morrow did not attend. Viewers could ask questions of the cast through social media.

== Reception ==
=== Critical response ===
Review aggregator website Rotten Tomatoes gives the first American series of Love Island 55%, holding an average rating of 5.25 out of 10 with the consensus being "Crude, rude, but without that charming British attitude, Love Island fails to make a splash across the pond—though fans may still find comfort in its cynically familiar formula". Metacritic, which uses a weighted average, gives the series a score of 56 indicating "mixed or average" reviews. After watching the pilot, Yohana Desta of Vanity Fair said the series "was a charmer in its first episode" but noted the differences between host Arielle Vandenberg and narrator Matthew Hoffman from their British counterparts Caroline Flack and Iain Stirling, respectively, stating Vanderberg is much more of a joker than Flack and that Hoffman had not captured the "snarky energy" of Stirling. Eric Thurm of The A.V. Club called the series "pure chaotic evil" and said, "Love Island is about a bunch of hot people sitting by a pool bonding over the fact that they have nothing to do". Thurm also said the pacing is too quick, with Islanders doing nothing and everything in the same episode. Reviewing the first five episodes, Kathryn VanArendonk of Vulture stated "Love Island is boring, but hard to escape", but Ben Travers of IndieWire opined that the contestants were bland.

=== Viewing figures ===
CBS Entertainment president Kelly Kahl told The Hollywood Reporter it was targeting a young, mostly female audience for the series. It also said the average Love Island viewer is eight years younger than CBS' wider average audience. Kahl also said there was a large, social-media-based engagement with the series, noting it has created a large amount of enthusiasm at the network. Despite regularly having generally poor viewing figures, CBS revealed Love Island was the most-streamed show on CBS All Access during the summer television schedule, outpacing other summer series Big Brother as well as other popular CBS series including Survivor and The Big Bang Theory. On August 29, 2019, Love Island averaged a 3.7% share in the 18-49 demographic and 2.7 million viewers per episode.

Despite the first season receiving mixed reviews from critics and less-than-ideal viewing figures, the series was renewed for a second season.

Viewership and ratings per episode of Love Island USA season 1
No.	Title	Air date	Timeslot (ET)	Rating/share (18–49)	Viewers (millions)	DVR (18–49)	DVR viewers (millions)	Total (18–49)	Total viewers (millions)	Ref.
1	"Episode 1"	July 9, 2019	Tuesday 8:00 p.m.	0.6/3	2.61	0.26	0.65	0.83	3.26	
2	"Episode 2"	July 10, 2019	Wednesday 8:00 p.m.	0.6/4	2.59	0.22	0.57	0.79	3.16	
3	"Episode 3"	July 11, 2019	Thursday 8:00 p.m.	0.6/4	2.51	0.23	0.59	0.82	3.10	
4	"Episode 4"	July 12, 2019	Friday 8:00 p.m.	0.4/3	2.03	0.25	0.60	0.61	2.58	
5	"Episode 5"	July 15, 2019	Monday 8:00 p.m.	0.5/3	1.98	0.24	0.64	0.72	2.62	
6	"Episode 6"	July 16, 2019	Tuesday 8:00 p.m.	0.5/3	2.25	0.22	0.55	0.73	2.80	
7	"Episode 7"	July 17, 2019	Wednesday 8:00 p.m.	0.5/3	2.40	0.21	0.52	0.76	2.92	
8	"Episode 8"	July 18, 2019	Thursday 8:00 p.m.	0.5/3	2.25	0.21	0.56	0.72	2.82	
9	"Episode 9"	July 19, 2019	Friday 8:00 p.m.	0.5/4	2.16	0.19	0.58	0.67	2.75	
10	"Episode 10"	July 22, 2019	Monday 8:00 p.m.	0.4/3	1.88	0.16	0.50	0.58	2.38	
11	"Episode 11"	July 23, 2019	Tuesday 8:00 p.m.	0.4/3	2.14	0.13	0.41	0.57	2.56	
12	"Episode 12"	July 24, 2019	Wednesday 8:00 p.m.	0.5/3	2.24	0.13	0.41	0.64	2.67	
13	"Episode 13"	July 25, 2019	Thursday 8:00 p.m.	0.5/3	2.18	0.13	0.40	0.62	2.59	
14	"Episode 14"	July 26, 2019	Friday 8:00 p.m.	0.3/3	1.97	0.18	0.50	0.52	2.43	
15	"Episode 15"	July 29, 2019	Monday 8:00 p.m.	0.4/2	2.05	0.17	0.51	0.61	2.57	
16	"Episode 16"	July 30, 2019	Tuesday 8:00 p.m.	0.4/2	1.91	0.15	0.47	0.57	2.39	
17	"Episode 17"	July 31, 2019	Wednesday 8:00 p.m.	0.5/3	2.38	0.18	0.46	0.71	2.86	
18	"Episode 18"	August 1, 2019	Thursday 8:00 p.m.	0.5/3	2.26	0.14	0.43	0.63	2.70	
19	"Episode 19"	August 2, 2019	Friday 8:00 p.m.	0.3/3	1.92	0.16	0.45	0.50	2.38	
20	"Episode 20"	August 5, 2019	Monday 8:00 p.m.	0.4/2	2.00	0.17	0.43	0.58	2.44	
21	"Episode 21"	August 6, 2019	Tuesday 8:00 p.m.	0.4/3	1.95	0.17	0.42	0.56	2.38	
22	"Episode 22"	August 7, 2019	Wednesday 8:00 p.m.	0.5/3	2.54	0.13	0.40	0.63	2.95	
