= The Mole (American TV series) season 6 =

The Mole
- Season 6
- Presented by: Alex Wagner
- No. of contestants: 12
- Winner: William Richardson
- Runner-up: Joi Schweitzer
- Location: New South Wales & Queensland, Australia
- The Mole: Kesi Neblett
- No. of episodes: 10

Release
- Original network: Netflix
- Original release: October 7 – October 21, 2022

Season chronology
- ← Previous; Season 5 (on ABC) Next → Season 7

The sixth season of the American version of The Mole, which is the first installment by Netflix, premiered on October 7, 2022. The season saw the series rebooted after a fourteen-year hiatus and leaving its former network, ABC. The season was produced by Eureka Productions with a new host, Alex Wagner. The cast was revealed on 21 September 2022, with the season's location confirmed to be Australia.

== Format ==
Following a similar format as several versions of the franchise, twelve players are gathered to complete assignments to earn money for the group pot. However, one of the twelve is the titular "Mole", a player selected by production to secretly sabotage the assignments and cause the group to earn the least amount of money for the winner's pot as possible. Every few days, players would take a multiple choice test about the identity of the Mole and the Mole's actions over the course of last few days. Once the test is complete, the players await their results in an elimination ceremony. The player with the lowest score is eliminated from the game, while in the event of the tie the player who completed their test the slowest is eliminated. Contestants are eliminated until there are three remaining players (two genuine contestants and the Mole themself), where they must complete a final test about the identity and actions of the Mole throughout the season.

Unlike past editions, the final question of "Who is The Mole?" had the most weight in terms of the final quiz outcome – had both genuine contestants answered differently, then the winner would be the one to correctly identify the Mole. Had they answered the same on this question, then the answers of the other questions would be used to determine the winner.

== Contestants ==
| Player | Age | Hometown | Occupation | Game Status |
|---|---|---|---|---|
| William Richardson | 29 | Henderson, Nevada | Lifestyle Brand Manager | Winner |
| Kesi Neblett | 27 | New York City | Software Developer | The Mole |
| Joi Schweitzer | 40 | Atlanta, Georgia | Commercial Airline Pilot | Runner-up |
| Avori Henderson | 26 | Phoenix, Arizona | Professional Gamer | 9th eliminated |
| Jacob Hacker | 29 | Bloomville, Ohio | Firefighter Paramedic Lieutenant | 8th eliminated |
| Greg Shapiro | 32 | Seattle, Washington | Marketing Consultant | 7th eliminated |
| Casey Lary | 39 | Chico, California | ICU Nurse | 6th eliminated |
| Pranav Patel | 29 | Boston, Massachusetts | Law Firm Associate | 5th eliminated |
| Sandy Ronquillo | 26 | Fort Worth, Texas | ABA Therapist | 4th eliminated |
| Dom Gabriel | 29 | Toronto, Canada | Heavy Machine Operator | 3rd eliminated |
| Samara Joy | 25 | Atlanta, Georgia | Mental Health Counselor | 2nd eliminated |
| Osei White | 32 | Brooklyn, New York | Real Estate Agent | 1st eliminated |

=== Future appearances ===
Dom Gabriel and Will Richardson appeared on the first season of Perfect Match. Gabriel returned for the season two. Avori Henderson appeared on season one of Battle Camp.

In 2025, Gabriel competed on the third season of The Traitors Canada.

== Elimination chart ==
Color key:

Winner
The Mole
Runner-up
Earned or claimed exemption
Eliminated
Lost re-entry mission

| | Episode 2 | Episode 3 | Episode 4 | Episode 5 | Episode 6 | Episode 7 | Episode 8 | Episode 9 | | Episode 10 Final |
| Quiz | 1 | 2 | 3 | 4 | 5 | 6 | 7 | 8 | 9 | 10 |
|---|---|---|---|---|---|---|---|---|---|---|
| Total pot value | $12,500 | $26,500 | $3,500 | $3,500 | $29,500 | $49,500 | $69,500 | $69,500 | $96,500 | $101,500 |
| William | Safe | Safe | Safe | Safe | Safe | Safe | Safe | Safe | Safe | Winner (Episode 10) |
| Kesi | Safe | Safe | Safe | Safe | Safe | Exempt | Safe | Safe | Safe | The Mole (Episode 10) |
| Joi | Safe | Safe | Exempt | Safe | Safe | Safe | Safe | Safe | Safe | Runner-up (Episode 10) |
| Avori | Safe | Exempt | Safe | Safe | Safe | Safe | Safe | Safe | Eliminated | Eliminated (Episode 9) |
| Jacob | Safe | Safe | Safe | Safe | Safe | Safe | Safe | Eliminated | Eliminated (Episode 9) | |
| Greg | Safe | Exempt | Safe | Safe | Safe | Safe | Eliminated | Eliminated (Episode 8) | | |
| Casey | Safe | Exempt | Safe | Safe | Safe | Eliminated | Eliminated (Episode 7) | | | |
| Pranav | Safe | Exempt | Safe | Safe | Eliminated | Eliminated (Episode 6) | | | | |
| Sandy | Safe | Exempt | Safe | Eliminated | Eliminated (Episode 5) | | | | | |
| Dom | Safe | Safe | Eliminated | Eliminated (Episode 4) (Note: In Episode 4, Dom, who was eliminated following the third quiz, was given an opportunity to re-enter the game by successfully completing a re-entry mission. Dom failed to complete the mission and remained eliminated.) | | | | | | |
| Samara | Safe | Eliminated | Eliminated (Episode 3) | | | | | | | |
| Osei | Eliminated | Eliminated (Episode 2) | | | | | | | | |
| Exemptions | (none) | Avori, Casey, Greg, Pranav, Sandy | Joi | (none) | | Kesi | Not earned | (none) | | |
| Eliminated | Osei; Lowest score | Samara; Lowest score | Dom; Lowest score | Sandy; Lowest score | Pranav; Lowest score | Casey; Lowest score | Greg; Lowest score | Jacob; Lowest score | Avori; Lowest score | Kesi; The Mole |
| Eliminated | Osei; Lowest score | Samara; Lowest score | Dom; Lost re-entry into game | Sandy; Lowest score | Pranav; Lowest score | Casey; Lowest score | Greg; Lowest score | Jacob; Lowest score | Avori; Lowest score | Joi; Lowest score |
| Eliminated | Osei; Lowest score | Samara; Lowest score | Dom; Lost re-entry into game | Sandy; Lowest score | Pranav; Lowest score | Casey; Lowest score | Greg; Lowest score | Jacob; Lowest score | Avori; Lowest score | William; Highest score |

== Episodes ==
| Episode | Airdate | Title | Amount in Pot (Note: Pot earnings: indicates an increase indicates no change indicates a decrease) | Location | Eliminated | |
|---|---|---|---|---|---|---|
| 1 | October 7, 2022 | "Are You The Mole?" | $0 → $12,500 | Daintree Rainforest, Queensland | —N/a | |
| 2 | October 7, 2022 | "Take No Prisoners" | $12,500 → $26,500 | Brisbane, Queensland | Osei | |
| 3 | October 7, 2022 | "Knowledge Is Power" | $26,500 → $28,500 | Great Barrier Reef, Queensland | Samara | |
| 4 | October 7, 2022 | "Bank Heist" | $28,500 → $3,500 | Ravenswood, Queensland | Dom | |
| 5 | October 7, 2022 | "Human Lie Detector" | $3,500 → $14,500 | Gympie, Queensland | Sandy | |
| 6 | October 14, 2022 | "Mountain Mole" | $14,500 → $49,500 | Blue Mountains, New South Wales | Pranav | |
| 7 | October 14, 2022 | "Spot the Fake" | $49,500 → $69,500 | Sydney, New South Wales | Casey | |
| 8 | October 14, 2022 | "The Bird Cage" | $69,500 | Sydney, New South Wales | Greg | |
| 9 | October 21, 2022 | "Cold Hard Cash" | $69,500 → $96,500 | Snowy Mountains, New South Wales | Jacob | |
| 9 | October 21, 2022 | "Cold Hard Cash" | $69,500 → $96,500 | Snowy Mountains, New South Wales | Avori | |
| Finale | October 21, 2022 | "Who is the Mole?" | $96,500 → $101,500 | Sydney, New South Wales | Runner-up | Joi |
| Finale | October 21, 2022 | "Who is the Mole?" | $96,500 → $101,500 | Sydney, New South Wales | Winner | William |
| Finale | October 21, 2022 | "Who is the Mole?" | $96,500 → $101,500 | Sydney, New South Wales | The Mole | Kesi |

== Season summary ==
Missions are listed in this section in chronological order.

=== Episode 1 ===
Episode 1Original airdate: October 7, 2022Location: Daintree Rainforest, Queensland
| Mission | Money earned | Possible earnings |
|---|---|---|
| Jungle Mission | $12,500 | $20,000 |
| Current Pot | $12,500 | $20,000 |

Jungle Mission

All 12 contestants meet at a plane in the Daintree Rainforest for the first mission. They must split into three groups to find and retrieve three cargo crates within the jungle: one suspended from a tree, one buried underground and one submerged in a river. For each crate found and returned to the plane within one hour, and kept there until the following morning, $5,000 is be added to the pot.

Inside the plane are bags of maps and supplies which groups can use to help them locate and retrieve the crates. Each bag also contains an envelope with a clue to help them release the crate, however opening it reduces the crate's value by $2,500. Also hidden inside the plane is a secret mission. If the contestant who finds the mission is able to steal one of the crates undetected, the value of that crate is doubled. However, if they are caught, the crate loses all value.

$12,500 was earned for the pot.

=== Episode 2 ===
Episode 2Original airdate: October 7, 2022Location: Brisbane, QueenslandQuiz 1 & Elimination
| Mission | Money earned | Possible earnings |
|---|---|---|
| Prison Break Mission | $14,000 | $20,000 |
| Red Button Mission (Note: The result of the mission was revealed at the start of the next episode.) | $0 | $10,000 |
| Current Pot | $26,500 | $50,000 |

Exemptions
| Avori, Casey, Greg, Pranav & Sandy | Exemption for Quiz 2 – Pushed red button first during the Red Button Mission |

Elimination
| Osei | 1st player eliminated |

Prison Break Mission

The group must elect two members as the "masterminds" of the mission, who then divide the remaining ten contestants into three groups. Each group member begins locked in a cell within their group's cell block in the Boggo Road Gaol. Similar to an escape room, they must use various items and clues to escape their cell, and help remaining members escape if necessary. If all three groups escape their cell within one hour, $10,000 is added to the pot.

Throughout the mission, the masterminds are given several decisions to make. First, they can reduce the time-limit by ten minutes to raise the potential earnings to $20,000. Second, they can spend $1,000 to give each group a clue to escape. Third, they can spend $5,000 to increase the remaining time-limit by five minutes.

$14,000 was earned for the pot.

Red Button Mission

Contestants travel in two cars, which form their group for the mission, to a warehouse. Each group enters either Sector 31 (Dom, Jacob, Joi, Kesi, Samara & William) or Sector 45 (Avori, Casey, Greg, Pranav & Sandy) of the warehouse where they learn that one contestant will be eliminated after the upcoming quiz. Each group can press the red button in the room, or leave it. If both groups don't press the button, $10,000 is earned for the pot. However, if one group presses the button, they receive Exemptions for the upcoming quiz and no money is earned. If both groups press the red button, the first group to do so receive the Exemptions.

To press the red buttons, groups must activate them first by deciphering several clues in an adjacent room, using a periodic table, to obtain the password "salvation." Every ten minutes, a phone between the two sectors is activated and two members from each group must remain on the phone while it is connected.

No money was earned for the pot. Avori, Casey, Greg, Pranav and Sandy pressed the red button first and won Exemptions for the next quiz.

=== Episode 3 ===
Episode 3Original airdate: October 7, 2022Location: Great Barrier Reef, QueenslandQuiz 2 & Elimination
| Mission | Money earned | Possible earnings |
|---|---|---|
| Knowledge Is Power Mission | -$25,000 | $10,000 |
| Sunken Treasure Mission | $2,000 | $10,000 |
| Current Pot | $3,500 | $70,000 |

Exemptions
| Joi | Exemption for Quiz 3 – Placed highest bid and guessed correctly during the Knowledge Is Power Mission |

Elimination
| Samara | 2nd player eliminated |

Knowledge Is Power Mission

Each contestant is individually presented with a dilemma. They can read a set of dossiers containing information about the remaining contestants or leave them unread. If no contestants read the dossiers, the group earn $10,000 for the pot. Additionally, the dilemma also states that their integrity would be "rewarded" if they didn't read the dossiers.

After the Sunken Treasure Mission, it was revealed that all contestants who did not read the dossiers could privately bid, with money from the pot, to select a contestant they believe did read the dossiers. The contestant who bids the most money wins the chance to select a contestant who they believe read the dossiers. If they are correct, they receive an Exemption and the money they bid is removed from the pot.

Joi had the highest bid of $25,000 and correctly guessed that Greg read the dossiers, meaning she won an Exemption and $25,000 was removed from the pot.

Sunken Treasure Mission

The group divides themselves into two teams: a boat team and a plane team. The plane team must board a seaplane over the Great Barrier Reef and search for a dinghy containing an underwater retrieval system on a beach, then cross the island to deliver it to the boat team. The boat team must search the seafloor for five chests and use the underwater retrieval system to resurface them. For each chest resurfaced within 90 minutes, $2,000 is added to the pot.

$2,000 was earned to the pot.

=== Episode 4 ===
Episode 4Original airdate: October 7, 2022Location: Ravenswood, QueenslandQuiz 3 & Elimination
| Mission | Money earned | Possible earnings |
|---|---|---|
| Re-Entry Mission | $0 | $10,000 |
| Bank Heist Mission | $0 | $20,000 |
| Current Pot | $3,500 | $100,000 |

Elimination
| Dom | 3rd player eliminated |

Re-Entry Mission

After Dom's elimination at the start of the episode, he is driven to Ravenswood, and is given a chance to return to the game by guessing the American city printed on the back of the car, from a list of ten cities. To assist, Dom can use a walkie-talkie to ask the group biographical questions about themselves. If the group chooses to help answer the questions, he can use their answers to eliminate incorrect cities. If Dom correctly guesses the city (Seattle), he returns to the game with $10,000 for the pot, otherwise he remains eliminated.

The group ultimately decided to not assist Dom with re-entering the game. No money was earned, and Dom remained eliminated after guessing incorrectly.

Bank Heist Mission

The group must elect their two best "critical thinkers" who then divide the remaining seven contestants into two teams: a gold team and a cash team. Each critical thinker then coordinates a group for the mission from the surveillance room of a bank. Pranav directed the cash team while Kesi directed the gold team.

The cash team must count exactly US$10,000 of banknotes from a vault. However, the notes are denominated in various foreign currencies and their critical thinker must inform them of the exchange rate of each currency written on a sign to convert the money. If they count the equivalent of US$10,000 exactly at the end of one hour, they would earn $10,000 for the pot.

The gold team must first maneuver past several lasers to reach a vault with over 1,000 lockboxes and three sets of keys. They must match the keys to its lockbox to unlock them and find ten gold nuggets. Their critical thinker can inform them which key unlocks each box by finding its value and name in a logbook. Unbeknownst to them, only the ten lockboxes with a gold-related name e.g. "K. Midas" in the logbook contain gold. If the group find all ten gold nuggets within one hour, $10,000 is added pot.

No money was earned for the pot.

=== Episode 5 ===
Episode 5Original airdate: October 7, 2022 Location: Gympie, QueenslandQuiz 4 & Elimination
| Mission | Money earned | Possible earnings |
|---|---|---|
| Mail Run Mission | $11,000 | $18,000 |
| Food Bomb Mission | $15,000 | $15,000 |
| Current Pot | $29,500 | $133,000 |

Elimination
| Sandy | 4th player eliminated |

Mail Run Mission

Contestants divide themselves into three groups based on how they want to travel to Dagun Station for the mission: by train, on foot or by car. Each group has 90 minutes (the time it takes the train) to collect three packages and deliver them to the station.

The group travelling by train attempt to use a hook to retrieve three packages hanging on the side of the track as the train passes on the way to Dagun Station. Each bag they obtain is worth $2,000. The group travelling on foot must run seven miles towards the station, collecting three packages worth $3,000 each at properties along the way. Along the trail are also bicycles which they can use instead at the cost of $2,000. The group travelling by car use a map to navigate and drive themselves to the station, and collect three packages worth $1,000 each along the way. For each package delivered to Dagun Station in time, its value is added to the pot.

$11,000 was earned for the pot.

Food Bomb Mission

Each contestant sits on a chair around a table. Once they are seated, it is revealed that two contestants are sitting on the detonator of a bomb, which explodes if both of them stand up.

During the challenge, the group is served a three-course lunch. Each visually identical dish is served as normal for the contestants sitting on the detonator, but has an unusual flavor or ingredient for the other contestants. After each course, they must vote for two contestants to leave the table based on their reaction to consuming the food. If one or two of the contestants sitting on the detonator remain at the end of the third course, the group may earn $15,000. However, contestants remaining at the end of the meal may have a chance to win an Exemption instead.

After the three courses, Joi and William remained seated. As the contestant not sitting on the detonator, Joi can walk towards a dilemma. She can defuse the bomb within three minutes to earn $15,000, or let the bomb explode to claim the Exemption. She chose to defuse the bomb, winning the $15,000 for the pot.

=== Episode 6 ===
Episode 6Original airdate: October 14, 2022Location: Blue Mountains, New South WalesQuiz 5 & Elimination
| Mission | Money earned | Possible earnings |
|---|---|---|
| Mountaineering Mission | $20,000 | $30,000 |
| Chained Up Mission | $0 | $10,000 |
| Current Pot | $49,500 | $173,000 |

Exemptions
| Kesi | Exemption for Quiz 6 – Claimed during the Chained Up Mission |

Elimination
| Pranav | 5th player eliminated |

Mountaineering Mission

Before the mission, the Mole selected three contestants' backpacks to place $10,000 in. The group must complete a mountaineering course through the Blue Mountains, which includes abseiling down a cliff face, scaling a rock and pulling themselves across a tightrope. However, along the course, including the start, the group must select a total of four contestants not to continue the course. This means they cannot proceed to the finish with their backpack, although they can still communicate with the group via a two-way radio. For each backpack that contains $10,000 to reach the end of the course within two hours, the money inside is added to the pot.

Two backpacks containing money reached the finish meaning $20,000 was earned for the pot.

Chained Up Mission

The group begin chained together in an empty building. Every ten minutes, a cage opens, and one contestant can take the key inside and unlock themselves from the chain each time. If all seven contestants unlock themselves, then $20,000 is added to the pot. However, next to the key is also an Exemption; if any player takes the Exemption, they claim it for themselves, no money is earned, and any contestants still chained must spend the night in the building.

Kesi was chosen first to approach the cage and took the Exemption, claiming it for herself, meaning no money was earned for the pot.

=== Episode 7 ===
Episode 7Original airdate: October 14, 2022Location: SydneyQuiz 6 & Elimination
| Mission | Money earned | Possible earnings |
|---|---|---|
| Fake Painting/Fake Story Mission | $20,000 | $20,000 |
| Current Pot | $69,500 | $193,000 |

Elimination
| Casey | 6th player eliminated |

Fake Painting/Fake Story Mission

The first part of the challenge presents the group with two paintings: one authentic painting and fake one painted by the Mole. Each contestant individually guesses which painting is fake and each contestant who correctly guesses has the chance to win an Exemption.

contestants who correctly guess the fake painting (Avori, Jacob & Joi) are individually taken to three separate locations for the second part of the challenge. Two of them undergo unique experiences, walking on hot coals and holding a snake, while the other does nothing and must later lie about it to try and deceive the three contestants who guessed incorrectly.

Afterwards, the three contestants who guessed incorrectly (Greg, Kesi & William) can interrogate each contestant to determine who is lying. If they correctly guess who is lying about their experience, $20,000 is added to the pot; otherwise, the three contestants who correctly guessed the fake painting all win Exemptions.

Greg, Kesi & William correctly guessed that Jacob was lying, meaning $20,000 was earned for the pot and the Exemptions were not claimed.

=== Episode 8 ===
Episode 8Original airdate: October 14, 2022Location: Sydney, New South WalesQuiz 7 & Elimination
| Mission | Money earned | Possible earnings |
|---|---|---|
| Cage Rescue Mission | $0 | $10,000 |
| Current Pot | $69,500 | $203,000 |

Elimination
| Greg | 7th player eliminated |

Cage Rescue Mission

The group must select the contestant they believe is the most observant, Avori, who is taken to and locked in a birdcage hidden somewhere in Sydney. She can use various items in the cage – a cell phone, a pizza box for Bill and Toni's Italian restaurant and a flyer about homing pigeons – to direct the remaining contestants to her location.

The remaining four contestants split into two groups: Joi & Kesi and Jacob & William. Each group is taken by taxi to a different starting point, given a key, and must find and unlock Avori within 90 minutes to earn $10,000 for the pot.

Joi & Kesi begin at the observation deck of Chifley Tower. Avori can indicate to them to find pigeons flying in a circle at a nearby park if she notices a flock of pigeons flying outside her location. At the park, Joi & Kesi must find a pigeon keeper and select one of three homing pigeons for him to release, the same one pictured in the flyer in Avori's birdcage. If they select the correct pigeon, they could follow its tracking chip using their phone to reach Avori.

Jacob & William begin at Bill and Toni's Italian restaurant. Avori can find the restaurant's phone number on the side of the pizza box, place the order for "Jimmy" written on the box, and specify the name as "Jimmy Vascos" (written in the homing pigeon flyer) when asked, to have a pizza sent to her location. Jacob & William could then follow the pizza delivery motorcycle to Avori's location, however along the way several similar motorcycles would cross their path and they must direct their taxi driver to follow the correct one.

No money was earned for the pot.

=== Episode 9 ===
Episode 9Original airdate: October 21, 2022Location: Snowy Mountains, New South WalesQuiz 8 & Elimination
| Mission | Money earned | Possible earnings |
|---|---|---|
| Snowy Mountains Mission | $16,000 | $20,000 |
| Money Risk Mission | $11,000 | $12,000 |

Quiz 9 & Elimination
| Mission | Money earned | Possible earnings |
| Current Pot | $96,500 | $235,000 |

Elimination
| Jacob | 8th player eliminated |
| Avori | 9th player eliminated |

Snowy Mountains Mission

The group must divide into two teams. Each team must follow a trail to the summit of a mountain, finding three beacons along the way. At each beacon, teams can use a tracker to find ice blocks with money frozen inside, and load them onto a pulk before proceeding. Each team can collect a total of $10,000 across the three beacons. For each ice block that reaches the summit within two hours, its amount of money is added to the pot.

$16,000 was earned for the pot.

Money Risk Mission

The group must collectively agree to assign each player one of four briefcases worth $0, $1,000, $3,000 or $8,000. After the next elimination, the value of the three surviving contestants' briefcases is added to the pot while the value of the eliminated contestant's briefcase is removed. If they cannot agree on the distribution of briefcases, then no money is earned.

Kesi ended up with the $0 briefcase; Avori ended up with the $1,000 briefcase; William ended up with the $3,000 briefcase and Joi ended up with the $8,000 briefcase. After the next quiz, Avori was eliminated, removing her $1,000 briefcase, meaning $11,000 was earned for the pot.

=== Episode 10 ===
Episode 10Original airdate: October 21, 2022Location: Sydney, New South Wales
| Mission | Money earned | Possible earnings |
|---|---|---|
| Spy Mission | $5,000 | $15,000 |
| Final Pot | $101,500 | $250,000 |

| Winner | William |
| The Mole | Kesi |
| Runner-up | Joi |

Spy Mission

The group has 30 minutes to collect three canisters worth $5,000 at three zones on Bare Island. At the Red Zone, they must use two poles to collect the canister suspended above a pit without dropping it. At the White Zone, one group member must use suction pads to cross a series of pipes to reach the canister without touching the ground. At the Blue Zone, one group member must cross a "minefield" to collect the canister within five seconds and throw it to another group member who must catch it for the canister to count. Throughout the mission, several drones fly around the island, and the mission is failed if the drones detect movement for three seconds.

$5,000 was earned for the pot, bringing the final pot to $101,500.

== Mole activity ==
The following acts of Mole activity were revealed during the finale, on Netflix's social media accounts or in Kesi's post-season interviews.

Jungle Mission: Kesi avoided sabotaging the first mission to garner trust from the contestants.

Prison Break Mission: Kesi saw the key needed to escape outside her cell but avoided telling her group until later to stall for time.

Re-Entry Mission: Even though Dom returning would have earned money for the pot, Kesi attempted to convince the group to help Dom return to appear trustworthy. This also later helped her be chosen first for the Chained Up Mission.

Bank Heist Mission: Kesi avoided reading out the gold-related names from the logbook to her team to prevent the respective lockboxes being opened.

Mail Run Mission: In the train group, Kesi deliberately dropped a bag hanging on the side of the tracks while trying to hook it.

Food Bomb Mission: Kesi was told by producers which seats contained the detonators and sat on one of them to give herself the best chance of reaching the end of the mission and being a part of the dilemma. However, she was voted out during the mission.

Mountaineering Mission: Kesi agreed to stay behind at the start of the mission despite knowing there was $10,000 in her backpack.

Chained Up Mission: Kesi took the exemption to appear as a genuine contestant who wanted it.

Snowy Mountains Mission: Kesi removed ice blocks containing money from her team's pulk throughout the mission with the intention of deceiving the other candidates that the Mole would not sabotage so obviously.

Spy Mission: Kesi deliberately fell while using the suction pads to cross the pipes, consequently losing the $5,000 canister of the White Zone.

== Hidden clues ==
The following clues were revealed on Netflix's YouTube channel.

Jungle Mission: The flag of Colombia and the numbers "0–6 160" were printed on the side of the plane, representing Kesi's undergraduate education at Columbia University, and her height and weight, respectively.

Bank Heist Mission: The whiskey bar which the group convened at after the mission had a bottle of Kentucky bourbon established in 1994 on the shelf, representing Kesi's home state and year of birth.

Food Bomb Mission: The number 42276 was printed on the bomb, the zipcode of Russellville, Kentucky – Kesi's hometown.

Cage Rescue Mission: The number 19941014 was printed on the barcode of the pizza box, representing Kesi's birthdate: October 14, 1994.
