= Perfect Match season 2 =

Perfect Match
- Season 2
- Hosted by: Nick Lachey
- No. of contestants: 22
- Winners: Christine Obanor; Nigel Jones
- Location: Tulum, Mexico
- No. of episodes: 10

Release
- Original network: Netflix
- Original release: June 7 – June 21, 2024

Season chronology
- ← Previous; Season 1 Next → Season 3

The second season of the television reality program Perfect Match premiered on Netflix on June 7, 2024, and concluded on June 21, 2024. Nick Lachey returned as host for the season.

== Contestants ==
The contestants were revealed on May 8, 2024.

Cast member	Age	Original series	Entered	Exited	Status
Christine Obanor	27	Too Hot to Handle 5	Episode 9	Episode 10	Winner
Nigel Jones	30	Too Hot to Handle 4	Episode 7	Episode 7	Winner
Nigel Jones	30	Too Hot to Handle 4	Episode 10	Episode 10	Winner
Alara Taneri	24	Dated and Related	Episode 3	Episode 10	Finalist
Bryton Constantin	23	Squid Game: The Challenge	Episode 1	Episode 2	Finalist
Bryton Constantin	23	Squid Game: The Challenge	Episode 9	Episode 10	Finalist
Chris Hahn	28	Dated and Related	Episode 2	Episode 10	Finalist
Elys Hutchinson	24	Too Hot to Handle 5	Episode 1	Episode 10	Finalist
Kaz Bishop	31	Dated and Related	Episode 1	Episode 10	Finalist
Micah Lussier	28	Love Is Blind 4	Episode 1	Episode 10	Finalist
Stevan Ditter	29	Too Hot to Handle 3	Episode 1	Episode 10	Finalist
Tolú Ekundare	26	The Trust: A Game of Greed	Episode 1	Episode 10	Finalist
Izzy Zapata	32	Love Is Blind 5	Episode 1	Episode 2	Eliminated
Izzy Zapata	32	Love Is Blind 5	Episode 9	Episode 10	Eliminated
Jessica Vestal	29	Love Is Blind 6	Episode 3	Episode 9	Eliminated
Jessica Vestal	29	Love Is Blind 6	Episode 10	Episode 10	Eliminated
Harry Jowsey	27	Too Hot to Handle 1	Episode 1	Episode 9	Eliminated
Justin Assada	26	Surviving Paradise	Episode 5	Episode 9	Eliminated
Brittan Byrd	23	Too Hot to Handle 4	Episode 7	Episode 7	Eliminated
Holly Scarfone	25	Too Hot to Handle 3	Episode 6	Episode 7	Eliminated
Melinda Melrose	31	Too Hot to Handle 2	Episode 6	Episode 7	Eliminated
Dom Gabriel	29	The Mole 6	Episode 2	Episode 5	Eliminated
Jake Cunningham	29	The Ultimatum: Marry or Move On 1	Episode 5	Episode 5	Eliminated
Dominique Defoe	24	Too Hot to Handle 4	Episode 1	Episode 4	Eliminated
Xanthi Perdikomatis	25	The Circle 5	Episode 1	Episode 4	Eliminated
Trevor Sova	31	Love Is Blind 6	—N/a (Note: Trevor was never brought into the competition but was given a chance during the mixer to find a match with the other contestants.)	—N/a	—N/a

=== Relationship status ===
Relationships	Still together?	Notes
Christine Obanor and Nigel Jones	No	Obanor and Jones dated for 9 months after the show finished filming.
Alara Taneri and Stevan Ditter	No	Taneri and Ditter split after filming.
Bryton Constantin and Elys Hutchinson	No	Constantin and Hutchinson split after filming.
Chris Hahn and Tolú Ekundare	No	Hahn and Ekundare split after filming.
Harry Jowsey and Jessica Vestal	No	Jowsey and Vestal split after filming.
Kaz Bishop and Micah Lussier	No	Bishop and Lussier split after filming.

=== Future appearances ===
In 2025, Netflix announced that Harry Jowsey would be starring in his own dating series called Let's Marry Harry. The show is expected to air in 2026.

== Matching progress ==
Perfect Match
Finalist
Unmatched and Eliminated
Unmatched by Choice and Eliminated

Episodes	1/2		2/3	4/5	6	7	8/9 (Note: All eliminated and non-entered singles returned to the villa and were given a chance during the mixer to match with current contestants in order to return to the competition.)	10	Final
Compatibility Challenge Winners	(None)	Elys & Harry	Kaz & Micah	Dom & Tolú	Alara & Stevan	Kaz & Micah	(None)	Chris & Tolú	(None)
The Boardroom Singles	(None)	Chris; Dom; Justin; Nigel	Alara; Holly; Jessica; Melinda	Jake; Justin; Nigel; Trevor	Brittan; Christine; Holly; Melinda	Brittan; Christine; Nigel; Trevor	(None)	Brittan; Jessica; Nigel; Trevor	(None)
Christine	Not in Villa						Kaz	Nigel	Winners
Nigel	Not in Villa					Unmatched	Eliminated (Episode 7)	Christine	Winners
Alara	Not in Villa		Stevan	Stevan	Stevan	Stevan	Stevan	Stevan	Finalists
Stevan	Micah	Xanthi	Alara	Alara	Alara	Alara	Alara	Alara	Finalists
Bryton	Dominique	Unmatched	Eliminated (Episode 2)				Elys	Elys	Finalists
Elys	Harry	Harry	Chris	Justin	Justin	Justin	Bryton	Bryton	Finalists
Chris	Not in Villa	Dominique	Elys	Tolú	Tolú	Tolú	Tolú	Tolú	Finalists
Tolú	Izzy	Dom	Dom	Chris	Chris	Chris	Chris	Chris	Finalists
Kaz	Xanthi	Micah	Micah	Micah	Micah	Micah	Christine	Micah	Finalists
Micah	Stevan	Kaz	Kaz	Kaz	Kaz	Kaz	Izzy	Kaz	Finalists
Izzy	Tolú	Unmatched	Eliminated (Episode 2)				Micah	Jessica	Eliminated (Episode 10)
Jessica	Not in Villa		Harry	Harry	Harry	Harry	Unmatched	Izzy	Eliminated (Episode 10)
Harry	Elys	Elys	Jessica	Jessica	Jessica	Jessica	Unmatched	Eliminated (Episode 9)	
Justin	Not in Villa			Elys	Elys	Elys	Unmatched	Eliminated (Episode 9)	
Brittan	Not in Villa					Unmatched	Eliminated (Episode 7)		
Holly	Not in Villa				Unmatched	Eliminated (Episode 7)			
Melinda	Not in Villa				Unmatched	Eliminated (Episode 7)			
Dom	Not in Villa	Tolú	Tolú	Unmatched	Eliminated (Episode 5)				
Jake	Not in Villa			Unmatched	Eliminated (Episode 5)				
Dominique	Bryton	Chris	Unmatched	Eliminated (Episode 4)					
Xanthi	Kaz	Stevan	Unmatched	Eliminated (Episode 4)					
Trevor	Not in Villa								
Eliminated	(None)	Bryton, Izzy; Failed to match	Dominique, Xanthi; Failed to match	Dom, Jake; Failed to match	Holly, Melinda; Failed to match	Brittan, Nigel; Failed to match	Justin, Jessica, Harry; Failed to match	Izzy, Jessica; Unmatched by choice	Christine & Nigel; Most votes to win
Eliminated	(None)	Bryton, Izzy; Failed to match	Dominique, Xanthi; Failed to match	Dom, Jake; Failed to match	Holly, Melinda; Failed to match	Brittan, Nigel; Failed to match	Justin, Jessica, Harry; Failed to match	Izzy, Jessica; Unmatched by choice	Alara & Stevan, Bryton & Elys, Chris & Tolú, Kaz & Micah fewest votes to win

== Episodes ==
No. overall	No. in season	Title	Original release date
13	1	"Ready, Set, Match"	June 7, 2024
14	2	"Kiss and Tell"	June 7, 2024
15	3	"Chaos Theory"	June 7, 2024
16	4	"Truth Bombs"	June 7, 2024
17	5	"Shakeups & Breakups"	June 7, 2024
18	6	"Seeing Eye to Eye"	June 7, 2024
19	7	"Love Is Blindfolded"	June 14, 2024
20	8	"He Said, She Said"	June 14, 2024
21	9	"To Tell the Truth"	June 14, 2024
22	10	"Perfectly Ever After"	June 21, 2024

== Production ==
Filming of Season 2 took place in Tulum, Mexico during August and September 2023.
