= Perfect Match season 3 =

Perfect Match
- Season 3
- Hosted by: Nick Lachey
- No. of contestants: 22
- Winners: Daniel Perfetto; Lucy Syed
- Location: Tulum, Mexico
- No. of episodes: 10

Release
- Original network: Netflix
- Original release: August 1 – August 15, 2025

Season chronology
- ← Previous; Season 2 Next → Season 4

The third season of the television reality program Perfect Match premiered on Netflix on August 1, 2025 and concluded on August 15, 2025. Nick Lachey returned as host for the season.

== Contestants ==
The contestants were revealed on June 30, 2025.

Cast member	Age	Original series	Entered	Exited	Status
Daniel Perfetto	28	Dated and Related	Episode 1	Episode 10	Winner
Lucy Syed	29	Too Hot to Handle 6	Episode 1	Episode 10	Winner
Amber Desiree "AD" Smith	34	Love Is Blind 6	Episode 1	Episode 6	Runner-up
Amber Desiree "AD" Smith	34	Love Is Blind 6	Episode 7	Episode 10	Runner-up
Ollie Sutherland	33	Love Is Blind: UK 1	Episode 1	Episode 10	Runner-up
Freddie Powell	33	Love Is Blind: UK 1	Episode 2	Episode 6	Finalist
Freddie Powell	33	Love Is Blind: UK 1	Episode 8	Episode 10	Finalist
Louis Russell	24	Too Hot to Handle 5	Episode 1	Episode 10	Finalist
Madison Errichiello	28	Love Is Blind 8	Episode 1	Episode 10	Finalist
Rachel Recchia	29	The Bachelor 26	Episode 3	Episode 10	Finalist
Ray Gantt	29	Love Island USA 1	Episode 5	Episode 6	Finalist
Ray Gantt	29	Love Island USA 1	Episode 7	Episode 10	Finalist
Sandy Gallagher	27	The Ultimatum: Marry or Move On 3	Episode 1	Episode 10	Finalist
Carrington Rodriguez	27	Love Island USA 2	Episode 2	Episode 2	Eliminated
Carrington Rodriguez	27	Love Island USA 2	Episode 9	Episode 10	Eliminated
J.R. Warren	33	The Ultimatum: Marry or Move On 3	Episode 4	Episode 5	Eliminated
J.R. Warren	33	The Ultimatum: Marry or Move On 3	Episode 9	Episode 10	Eliminated
Juliette Porter	27	Siesta Key	Episode 1	Episode 3	Eliminated
Juliette Porter	27	Siesta Key	Episode 8	Episode 10	Eliminated
Scott van-der-Sluis	24	Love Island UK 10	Episode 4	Episode 10	Eliminated
Jalen Olomu-Brown	27	Too Hot to Handle 6	Episode 6	Episode 8	Eliminated
Justine Joy Ndiba	32	Love Island USA 2	Episode 6	Episode 8	Eliminated
Olivia Rae	27	Temptation Island 9	Episode 6	Episode 6	Eliminated
Clayton Echard	32	The Bachelorette 18	Episode 1	Episode 5	Eliminated
Alex Zamora	27	Temptation Island 9	Episode 3	Episode 3	Eliminated
Cody Wright	31	Temptation Island 9	Episode 1	Episode 2	Eliminated
Hannah Burns	24	The Mole 7	—N/a (Note: Hannah and QT were never brought into the competition but were given a chance during the mixer to find a match with the other contestants.)	—N/a	—N/a
Quori-Tyler "QT" Bullock	27	The Circle 6	—N/a	—N/a	—N/a

=== Relationship status ===
Relationships	Still together?	Notes
Daniel Perfetto and Lucy Syed	No	Perfetto and Syed broke up weeks after filming ended. As such, they never took their "Perfect Match" honeymoon trip.
Amber Desiree "AD" Smith and Ollie Sutherland	Yes	Smith and Sutherland announced their engagement at the reunion of Season 8 of Love Is Blind. On 2nd June 2025, the couple announced that they were pregnant with their first child.
Freddie Powell and Madison Errichiello	No	Powell and Errichiello broke up after filming ended due to the long-distance nature of their relationship.
Louis Russell and Sandy Gallagher	No	Russell and Gallagher took a vacation of their own after filming ended, but ultimately decided to break up.
Rachel Recchia and Ray Gantt	No	Recchia and Gantt broke up after filming ended due to a perceived lack of "romantic spark" between the two.

=== Future appearances ===
In 2025, Justine Ndiba competed on season two of Love Island Games.

In 2026, Scott van-der-Sluis and Carrington Rodriguez appeared on the third series of Love Island: All Stars.

== Matching progress ==
Perfect Match
Runner-Up
Finalist
Unmatched and Eliminated
Unmatched and Eliminated by Compatibility Winners

Episodes	1/2		2/3	3/4	5/6	7/8 (Note: All eliminated and non-entered singles returned to the villa and were given a chance during the mixer to match with current contestants in order to return to the competition.)	9/10	Final
Compatibility Challenge Winners	(None)	Cody & Madison	AD & Ollie	Sandy & Clayton	Daniel & Lucy	(None)	Rachel & Ray	(None)
The Boardroom Singles	(None)	Carrington; Freddie; Jalen; J.R.	Alex; Hannah; Rachel; QT	Jalen; J.R. Ray; Scott	Jalen; Justine; Olivia; Ray	(None)	Carrington; Clayton; Cody; J.R.	(None)
Daniel	Lucy	Lucy	Lucy	Lucy	Lucy	Lucy	Lucy	Winners
Lucy	Daniel	Daniel	Daniel	Daniel	Daniel	Daniel	Daniel	Winners
AD	Ollie	Ollie	Ollie	Ollie	Unmatched	Ollie	Ollie	Runners-up
Ollie	AD	AD	AD	AD	Justine	AD	AD	Runners-up
Freddie	Not in Villa	Madison	Madison	Madison	Unmatched	Madison	Madison	Finalists
Madison	Cody	Freddie	Freddie	Freddie	Jalen	Freddie	Freddie	Finalists
Louis	Sandy	Sandy	Sandy	Sandy	Sandy	Sandy	Sandy	Finalists
Sandy	Louis	Louis	Louis	Louis	Louis	Louis	Louis	Finalists
Rachel	Not in Villa		Clayton	Scott	Scott	Ray	Ray	Finalists
Ray	Not in Villa				Unmatched	Rachel	Rachel	Finalists
Carrington	Not in Villa	Unmatched	Eliminated (Episode 2)				Unmatched	Eliminated (Episode 10)
J.R.	Not in Villa			Unmatched	Eliminated (Episode 5)		Unmatched	Eliminated (Episode 10)
Juliette	Clayton	Clayton	Unmatched	Eliminated (Episode 3)		Scott	Unmatched	Eliminated (Episode 10)
Scott	Not in Villa			Rachel	Rachel	Juliette	Unmatched	Eliminated (Episode 10)
Jalen	Not in Villa				Madison	Unmatched	Eliminated (Episode 8)	
Justine	Not in Villa				Ollie	Unmatched	Eliminated (Episode 8)	
Olivia	Not in Villa				Unmatched	Eliminated (Episode 6)		
Clayton	Juliette	Juliette	Rachel	Unmatched	Eliminated (Episode 5)			
Alex	Not in Villa		Unmatched	Eliminated (Episode 3)				
Cody	Madison	Unmatched	Eliminated (Episode 2)					
Hannah	Not in Villa							
QT	Not in Villa							
Eliminated	(None)	Carrington, Cody; Failed to match	Alex, Juliette; Failed to match	Clayton, J.R. Failed to match	AD, Freddie; Unmatched by Daniel & Lucy	Jalen, Justine; Failed to match	Carrington, J.R. Juliette; Scott; Failed to match	Daniel & Lucy; Most votes to win
Eliminated	(None)	Carrington, Cody; Failed to match	Alex, Juliette; Failed to match	Clayton, J.R. Failed to match	AD, Freddie; Unmatched by Daniel & Lucy	Jalen, Justine; Failed to match	Carrington, J.R. Juliette; Scott; Failed to match	AD & Ollie; Least votes to win
Eliminated	(None)	Carrington, Cody; Failed to match	Alex, Juliette; Failed to match	Clayton, J.R. Failed to match	Olivia, Ray; Failed to match	Jalen, Justine; Failed to match	Carrington, J.R. Juliette; Scott; Failed to match	Freddie & Madison, Louis & Sandy, Rachel & Ray; Lost final compatibility challenge

== Production ==
Filming of Season 3 took place between August and October of 2024 in Tulum, Mexico.

== Episodes ==
No. overall	No. in season	Title	Original release date
23	1	"Let's Puck"	August 1, 2025
24	2	"Good Vibrations"	August 1, 2025
25	3	"Lip Service"	August 1, 2025
26	4	"Ultimate Temptation"	August 1, 2025
27	5	"The Ex-Factor"	August 1, 2025
28	6	"Double Trouble"	August 1, 2025
29	7	"Thighs and Lies"	August 8, 2025
30	8	"Forgive Him or Forget Him"	August 8, 2025
31	9	"Split it or Quit it"	August 8, 2025
32	10	"Perfectly Matched"	August 15, 2025
