= Perfect Match season 4 =

Perfect Match
- Season 4
- Hosted by: Nick Lachey
- No. of contestants: 20
- Winners: Dave Hand; Sophie Willett
- Location: Tulum, Mexico
- No. of episodes: 8

Release
- Original network: Netflix
- Original release: May 13 – May 27, 2026

Season chronology
- ← Previous; Season 3

The fourth season of the television reality program Perfect Match premiered on Netflix on May 13, 2026. Nick Lachey returned as host for the season.

== Contestants ==
The contestants were revealed on April 15, 2026.

Cast member	Age	Original series/Occupation	Entered	Exited	Status
Dave Hand	38	Married at First Sight Australia 12	Episode 2	Episode 8	Winner
Sophie Willett	29	Love Is Blind: UK 2	Episode 4	Episode 8	Winner
Alison Ogden	25	Building the Band	Episode 1	Episode 8	Finalist
Ally Lewber	30	Vanderpump Rules	Episode 1	Episode 8	Finalist
DeMari Davis	29	Too Hot to Handle 6	Episode 1	Episode 8	Finalist
Jimmy Presnell	30	Love Is Blind USA 6	Episode 1	Episode 7	Finalist
Jimmy Presnell	30	Love Is Blind USA 6	Episode 8	Episode 8	Finalist
Jimmy Sotos	29	Social media personality	Episode 2	Episode 8	Finalist
Marissa George	34	Love Is Blind USA 7	Episode 1	Episode 8	Finalist
Natalie Cruz	24	Temptation Island 9	Episode 1	Episode 8	Finalist
Yamen Sanders	31	Love Island USA 1	Episode 1	Episode 8	Finalist
Kayla Richart	25	Too Hot to Handle 4	Episode 2	Episode 3	Eliminated
Kayla Richart	25	Too Hot to Handle 4	Episode 6	Episode 8	Eliminated
Weston Richey	31	Love Island USA 1	Episode 6	Episode 8	Eliminated
Brianna "Bri" Balram	28	Too Hot To Handle 6	Episode 8	Episode 8	Eliminated
Hashim Moore	31	Temptation Island 9	Episode 6	Episode 8	Eliminated
Mackenzie Bellows	25	Squid Game: The Challenge 2	Episode 1	Episode 5	Eliminated
Kassy Castillo	25	Love Island USA 5	Episode 4	Episode 5	Eliminated
Katherine LaPrell	30	Too Hot to Handle 6	Episode 4	Episode 5	Eliminated
Chris Dahlan	27	Age of Attraction	Episode 1	Episode 3	Eliminated
Nick Pellecchia	27	Million Dollar Secret 2	Episode 1	Episode 3	Eliminated
Danny Spongberg	24	Temptation Island 9	—N/a (Note: Danny was never brought into the competition but was given a chance during the mixer to find a match with the other contestants.)	—N/a	—N/a

=== Relationship status ===
Relationships	Still together?	Notes
Dave Hand and Sophie Willett	No	Hand and Willett broke up shortly after their "honeymoon" trip to the Maldives due to communication issues that arose from the long-distance nature of their relationship.
Jimmy Presnell and Ally Lewber	No	Presnell visited Lewber in Los Angeles a few times after the show ended, however, they ultimately decided to breakup as they were not were not ready to commit.
DeMari Davis and Marissa George	No	Davis and George broke up at the end of the experience and decided to leave as friends.
Jimmy Sotos and Alison Ogden	Figuring Things Out	Sotos visited Ogden for Thanksgiving, but the couple decided to "pause things for a bit". They later reconnected and are now "exploring their connection without pressure, labels or expectations".
Yamen Sanders and Natalie Cruz	No	Sanders and Cruz broke up after the show. Cruz then briefly dated Chris Dahlan, another member from the show.

== Matching progress ==
Perfect Match
Runner-Up
Finalist
Unmatched and Eliminated
Unmatched and Eliminated by Choice

Episodes	1/2/3		4/5	6/7 (Note: All eliminated and non-entered singles returned to the villa and were given a chance during the mixer to match with current contestants in order to return to the competition.)	8	Final
Compatibility Challenge Winners	(None)	DeMari & Marissa	DeMari & Marissa	(None)	Sophie & Dave	(None)
The Boardroom Singles	(None)	Bri; Dave; Jimmy S Kayla	Bri; Kassy; Katherine; Sophie	(None)	Bri; Chris; Jimmy P	(None)
Dave	Not in Villa	Mackenzie	Sophie	Sophie	Sophie	Winners
Sophie	Not in Villa		Dave	Dave	Dave	Winners
Alison	Yamen	Jimmy S	Jimmy S	Jimmy S	Jimmy S	Finalists
Jimmy S	Not in Villa	Alison	Alison	Alison	Alison	Finalists
Ally	Jimmy P	Jimmy P	Jimmy P	Hashim	Jimmy P	Finalists
Jimmy P	Ally	Ally	Ally	Unmatched	Ally	Finalists
DeMari	Marissa	Marissa	Marissa	Marissa	Marissa	Finalists
Marissa	DeMari	DeMari	DeMari	DeMari	DeMari	Finalists
Natalie	Nick	Yamen	Yamen	Yamen	Yamen	Finalists
Yamen	Alison	Natalie	Natalie	Natalie	Natalie	Finalists
Kayla	Not in Villa	Chris (Note: This contestant was eliminated following a house vote.)	Eliminated (Episode 3)	Weston	Weston (Note: Kayla decided to leave with Chris and unmatch with Weston)	Eliminated (Episode 8)
Weston	Not in Villa			Kayla	Kayla	Eliminated (Episode 8)
Bri	Not in Villa				Unmatched	Eliminated (Episode 8)
Hashim	Not in Villa			Ally	Unmatched	Eliminated (Episode 8)
Kassy	Not in Villa		Unmatched	Eliminated (Episode 5)		
Katherine	Not in Villa		Unmatched	Eliminated (Episode 5)		
Mackenzie	Chris	Dave	Unmatched	Eliminated (Episode 5)		
Chris	Mackenzie	Kayla	Eliminated (Episode 3)			
Nick	Natalie	Unmatched	Eliminated (Episode 3)			
Danny	Not in Villa					
Eliminated	(None)	Nick; Failed to match	Kassy, Katherine, Mackenzie; Failed to match	Jimmy P Failed to match	Bri, Hishim; Failed to match	Dave & Sophie; Most votes to win
Eliminated	(None)	Chris, Kayla; Unmatched by Villa	Kassy, Katherine, Mackenzie; Failed to match	Jimmy P Failed to match	Kayla, Weston; Unmatched by choice	Alison & Jimmy S, Ally & Jimmy P, DeMari & Marissa, Natalie & Yamen; Least votes to win

== Episodes ==
No. overall	No. in season	Title	Original release date
33	1	"Bombshells & Love Bombs"	May 13, 2026
34	2	"A Tell of Two Jimmys"	May 13, 2026
35	3	"Wet and Wild"	May 13, 2026
36	4	"Baddies Come In Threes"	May 13, 2026
37	5	"Ex's and Woe's"	May 13, 2026
38	6	"Loose Lips Sink Relationships"	May 20, 2026
39	7	"Split Decision"	May 20, 2026
40	8	"Rough Patches, Perfect Matches"	May 27, 2026
