= Perfect Match (TV series) =

Netflix reality television series

- Created by: Chris Coelen
- Presented by: Nick Lachey
- Starring: Perfect Match contestants
- Country of origin: United States
- Original language: English
- No. of seasons: 4
- No. of episodes: 40 (list of episodes)

Production
- Executive producers: Chris Coelen; Eric Detwiler; Sarah Dillistone; Heather Crowe; Sharyn Mills
- Running time: 38–106 minutes
- Production company: Kinetic Content

Original release
- Network: Netflix
- Release: February 14, 2023 – present

Perfect Match is a reality dating television series created by Chris Coelen and produced by Kinetic Content. It premiered on Netflix on February 14, 2023 and had a second season the following year. Season 3 was confirmed during the reunion for season 8 of Love Is Blind.

The series features contestants from other reality shows by Netflix, MTV and ABC who pair up, compete in challenges, and form relationships. The series is hosted by Nick Lachey.

Perfect Match has received mostly positive reviews from critics. The series has also been praised for its inclusion of three bisexual cast members, bucking the trend of reality dating shows featuring exclusively heterosexual couples.

== Format ==
A group of single dating show alumni arrive in a tropical villa where they attempt to match themselves into couples. The couples who win "compatibility challenges" get a private date and the ability to choose two new singles to bring into the game by either setting them up on a date with members of the other couples, or with themselves. Once the daters all have returned, the participants will match themselves all over again, and at the end of each night, anyone without a match must leave the villa. At the end of the series, only one couple is chosen as the Match.

== Episodes ==
| Season | Contestants | Episodes | Originally released | | Winners |
| Season | Contestants | Episodes | First released | Last released | Winners |
|---|---|---|---|---|---|
| 1 | 23 | 12 | February 14, 2023 | February 28, 2023 | Dom Gabriel & Georgia Hassarati |
| 2 | 22 | 10 | June 7, 2024 | June 21, 2024 | Christine Obanor & Nigel Jones |
| 3 | 22 | 10 | August 1, 2025 | August 15, 2025 | Daniel Perfetto & Lucy Syed |
| 4 | 20 | 8 | May 13, 2026 | May 27, 2026 | Dave Hand & Sophie Willett |

== Production ==
Season 1 took place in Playa Bonita, Panama City, Panama, during March 2022, before the third season of Love is Blind and The Mole had aired.

Season 2 took place in Tulum, Mexico during August and September 2023.

Netflix released a video game adaptation in June 2024 for iOS and Android. It is free but requires a Netflix subscription.

== Reception ==
=== Viewership ===
The series debuted at No. 2 on the English-language TV chart during the Feb. 13–19 viewing window, with "over 24 million hours viewed.

On February 22, 2023, Perfect Match became the No. 1 series in the Netflix US TV rankings.

According to FlixPatrol, which monitors daily updated VOD charts across the globe, Perfect Match has reached Netflix's No. 1 TV Series ranking in 38 countries around the world.

=== Critical response ===
Lauren Piester of TheWrap says Perfect Match "might actually be perfect." Piester states "It's endlessly watchable. It's funny. It's sexy, it's stupid, and it knows that it's all these things...I've never loved a dating show as much as I love this one."

Brett White at Decider says Perfect Match is "a series that may just be the first dating show of its kind that could be called prestige TV....It's like if Michelin-starred restaurant cranked out its own version of the Taco Bell menu. Yes, that's a Crunchwrap Supreme — but it's a Crunchwrap Supreme that would make Tom Colicchio weep... Everything about Perfect Match feels meticulously crafted to be peak binge-worthy TV.... I've fallen in love with this gourmet Gordita and junk food has never been this filling nor tasted this exquisite."

Tara Ariano at Vanity Fair says "Netflix's Blissfully Dumb Perfect Match Is Ideal Background Viewing. We mean that as a compliment!"

EJ Dickson of Rolling Stone writes "Netflix's Perfect Match is horny, utterly ridiculous fun...a show that doesn't care if you or anyone else thinks it's anything but lazy, frothy fun."

=== Impact on popular culture ===
Elizabeth Wagmeister at Variety writes Perfect Match is "changing the game for LGBTQ representation on reality TV"

Tilly Pearce at Digital Spy says "In a world where reality TV dating shows continue to be predominantly a straight person's game, Netflix's Perfect Match has achieved the impossible – by displaying not one, but three separate bisexual experiences in the space of one episode...In perhaps one of the most uniquely important conversations around queer love shown on reality television in recent years... Kariselle (opens) up to her match, The Circle's Joey Sasso, about her own sexuality and the effect it's had on her identity...and Perfect Match putting these conversations out into the world is what makes it stand out from rival dating shows. Perfect Match's multiple variations on queer love, bisexuality and the complicated feelings that may/may not come with that part of your identity is a refreshing, surprisingly deep, and much-needed positive take. It also displays positive examples of how to be an ally to loved ones who need that reassurance and support."
