= List of The Circle (American TV series) contestants =

The following is a list of players who have competed on The Circle (sometimes called The Circle US to differentiate from other international versions). The series is an American reality competition series, produced by Studio Lambert and Motion Content Group which first aired on Netflix in January 2020 that is based on a British TV series of the same name.

== Contestants ==
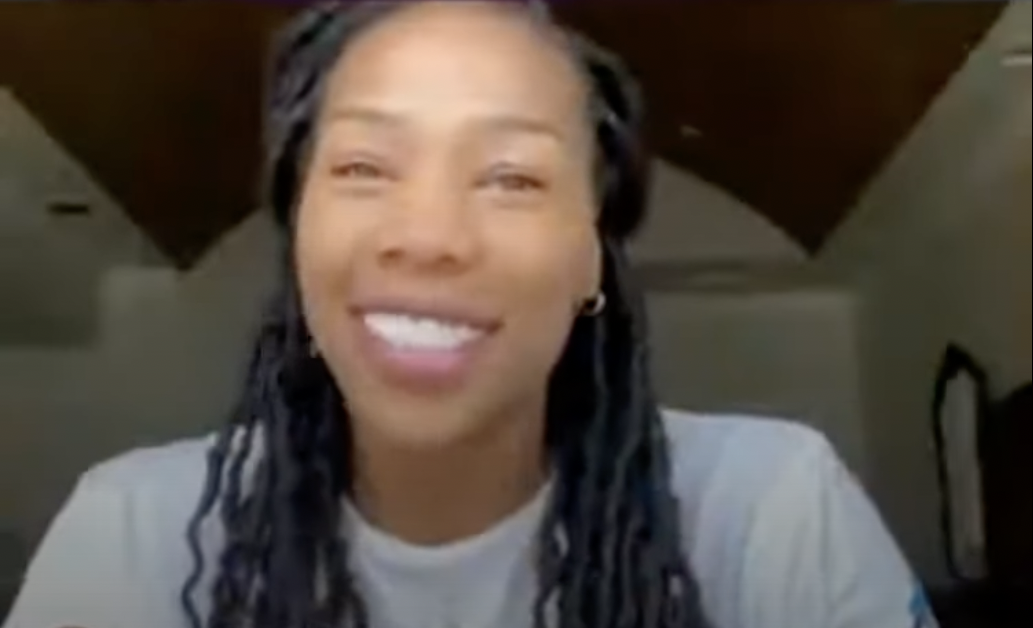
Khat Bell, The Circle 2

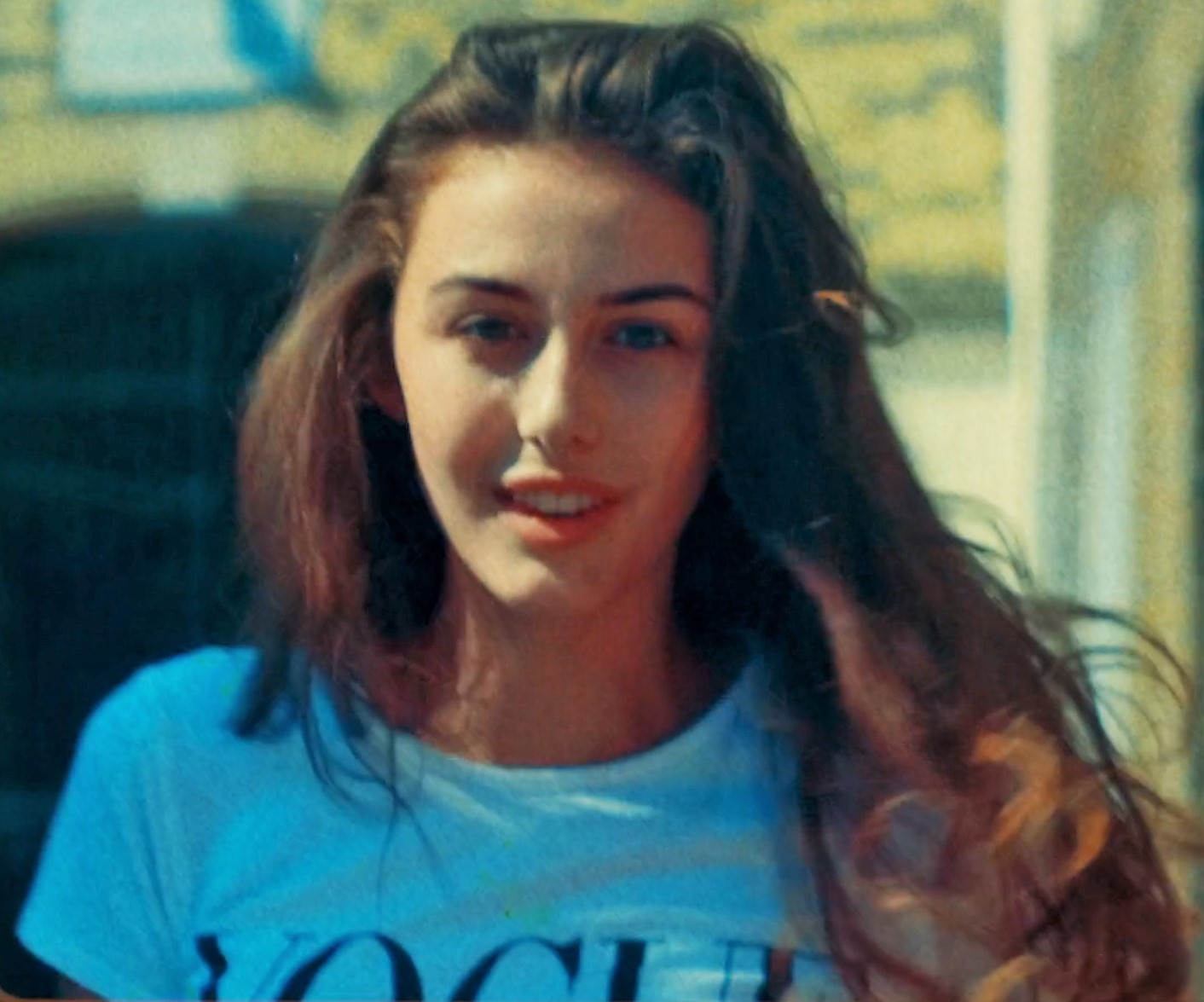
Chloe Veitch, The Circle 2

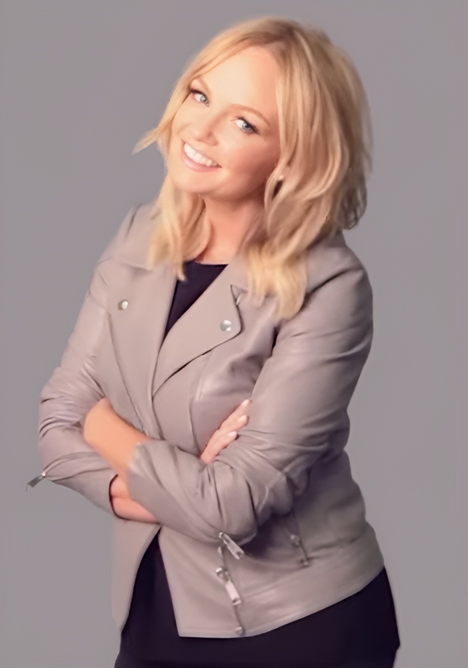
Emma Bunton, The Circle 3

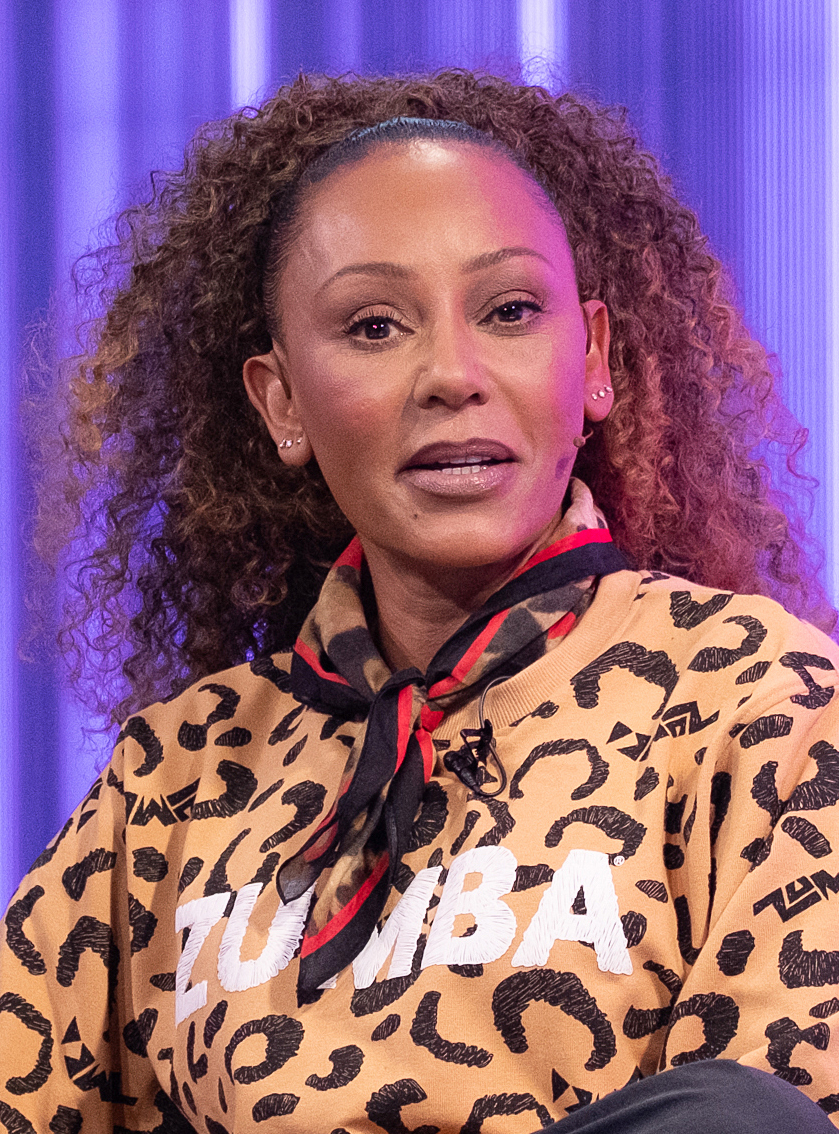
Mel B, The Circle 3

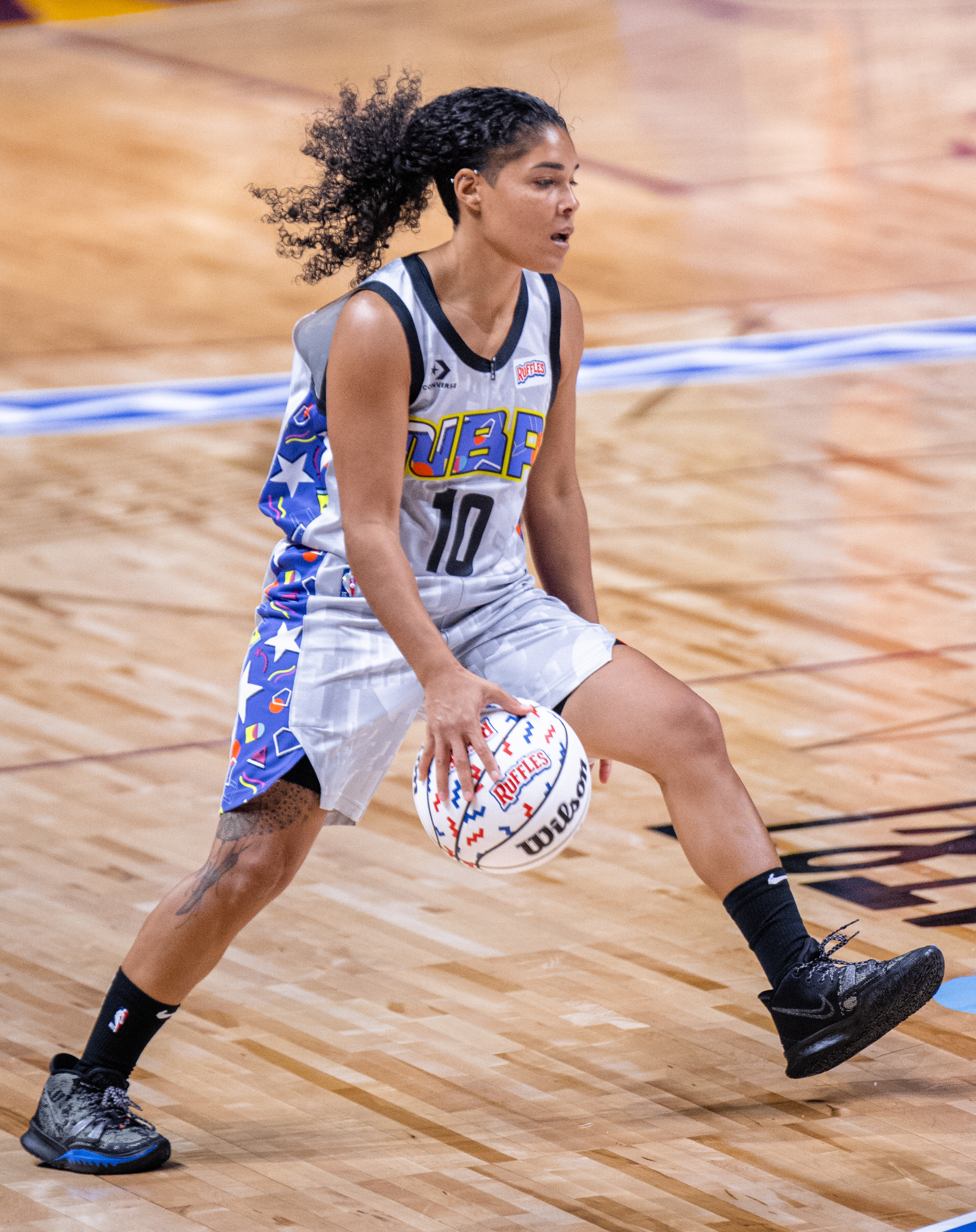
Crissa Jackson, The Circle 3

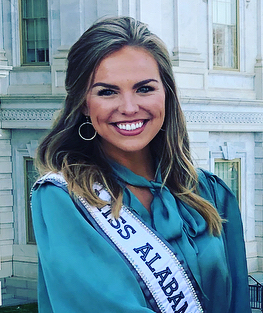
Hannah Brown, The Circle 8
Contestant played the game for a second time

Name	Age	Season	Placement	Ref.
Alana Duval	25	1	13th	
Antonio DePina	24	1	12th	
Karyn Blanco "Mercedeze"	37	1	11th	
Miranda Bissonnette	26	1	10th	
Bill Cranley	27	1	9th	
Alex Lake "Adam"	32	1	8th	
Sean Taylor	25	1	7th	
Ed Eason	23	1	6th	
Tammy Eason	52	1	6th	
Seaburn Williams "Rebecca"	29	1	5th	
Chris Sapphire	30	1	4th	
Samantha "Sammie" Cimarelli	24	1	3rd	
Shubham Goel	23	1	2nd	
Joey Sasso	25	1	1st	
Bryant Wood	27	2	10th	
Savannah Palacio	24	2	9th	
Terilisha	34	2	8th	
Khat Bell	27	2	7th	
Mitchell Eason	22	2	6th	
Jack Atkins "Emily" (Note: After being blocked in episode 8, Jack and Lisa joined forces later in the episode to become "John".)	20	2	5th	
Lisa Delcampo "Lance"	42	2	5th	
Lee Swift "River"	58	2	4th	
Courtney Revolution	28	2	3rd	
Chloe Veitch	22	2	2nd	
DeLeesa St. Agathe "Trevor"	32	2	1st	
Michelle Rider	52	3	12th	
Ava Marie Capra (Note: Ava and Chanel started in the season as themselves, but not revealing the presence of Chanel to the other players. After a twist, and after both were initially blocked, the duo began acting as a clone of "Michelle".)	25	3	11th	
Chanel Marie Capra "Ava"	42	3	11th	
Calvin Kiing Crooks	30	3	10th	
Rachel Ward "Jackson"	24	3	9th	
Ruksana Carroll	35	3	8th	
Daniel Cusimano	20	3	7th	
Jacki Jing	33	3	6th	
Nick Uhlenhuth	27	3	5th	
Keisha "Kai" Ghost	30	3	4th	
Sophia Layne "Isabella"	22	3	3rd	
Matthew Pappadia "Ashley"	29	3	2nd	
James Andre Jefferson Jr.	30	3	1st	
Parker Abbott "Paul"	21	4	12th	
Emma Bunton "Jared"	45	4	11th	
Mel B "Jared"	45	4	11th	
Crissa Jackson	31	4	10th	
Alyssa Ljubicich	27	4	9th	
John Franklin "Carol"	24	4	8th	
Josh "Bru" Brubaker	25	4	7th	
Alex Brizard "Nathan"	28	4	6th	
Eversen Bevelle	35	4	5th	
Yu Ling Wu	25	4	4th	
Rachel Evans	29	4	3rd	
Trevor St. Agathe "Imani"	35	4	2nd	
Frank Grimsley	28	4	1st	
Brian Clark "Brittney"	47	5	11th	
Billie-Jean Blackett "Bruno"	25	5	10th	
Shubham Goel "Sasha"	26	5	9th	
Marvin Achi	27	5	8th	
Tom Houghton	36	5	7th	
Oliver Twixt	26	5	6th	
Brett Robinson (Note: After being blocked in the first episode, Brett and Xanthi joined forces in the following episode to become "Jennifer".)	28	5	5th	
Xanthi Perdikomatis	25	5	5th	
Tasia Lesley "Tamira"	28	5	4th	
Raven Sutton	26	5	3rd	
Paris	31	5	3rd	
Chaz Lawery	28	5	2nd	
Sam Carmona	34	5	1st	
Steffi Hill	35	6	11th	
A.I. Bot "Max"	—	6	10th	
Cassie Saylor	29	6	9th	
Caress Alon "Paul"	37	6	8th	
Autumn Ann Nielsen	21	6	7th	
Myles Reed	29	6	6th	
Lauren LaChant	26	6	5th	
Jordan Staff	24	6	4th	
Quori-Tyler Bullock	26	6	3rd	
Kyle Fuller	31	6	2nd	
Brandon Baker "Olivia"	34	6	1st	
Savannah Miller	22	7	10th	
Heather Richardson "Andy"	26	7	9th	
Darian Holt	29	7	8th	
Garret Caillouet	29	7	7th	
Jadejha Edwards	24	7	6th	
Antonio Hayes "Tierra"	31	7	5th	
Deborah "Deb" Levy "Rachel"	54	7	4th	
Madelyn Rusinyak	25	7	3rd	
Kevin Fernandez	23	7	2nd	
Jojo Scarlotta "Gianna"	24	7	1st	
Nicky Scarlotta "Gianna"	24	7	1st	
Sasha Farber	42	8	9th	
Alyssa Khan	23	8	Participating	
Cyrus Irani	23	8	Participating	
Dominic DeAngelis "Lisa"	33	8	Participating	
Gina Baffour	26	8	Participating	
Yanis Nyantenji "Gina"	26	8	Participating	
Hannah Brown	32	8	Participating	
Justin Hinsley	27	8	Participating	
Kate Racker "Doug"	32	8	Participating	
Layla Taylor "Doug"	25	8	Participating	
Suave Pegues (Note: Suave started in the season as himself. After a twist, and after being blocked, he began acting as a clone of "TBA".)	30	8	Participating	
