= Perfect Match season 1 =

Perfect Match
- Season 1
- Hosted by: Nick Lachey
- No. of contestants: 23
- Winners: Dom Gabriel; Georgia Hassarati
- Location: Panama City, Panama
- No. of episodes: 12

Release
- Original network: Netflix
- Original release: February 14 – February 28, 2023

Season chronology
- Next → Season 2

The first season of the television reality program Perfect Match premiered on Netflix on February 14, 2023, and concluded on February 28, 2023. The season is hosted by Nick Lachey.

== Contestants ==
The contestants were announced in February 2023.

Cast member	Age	Original series	Entered	Exited	Status
Dom Gabriel	30	The Mole 6	Episode 1	Episode 12	Winner
Georgia Hassarati	26	Too Hot to Handle 3	Episode 3	Episode 12	Winner
Bartise Bowden	27	Love Is Blind 3	Episode 5	Episode 7	Finalist
Bartise Bowden	27	Love Is Blind 3	Episode 9	Episode 12	Finalist
Chloe Veitch	24	Too Hot to Handle 1	Episode 6	Episode 12	Finalist
Izzy Fairthorne	22	Too Hot to Handle 3	Episode 3	Episode 6	Finalist
Izzy Fairthorne	22	Too Hot to Handle 3	Episode 11	Episode 12	Finalist
Joey Sasso	29	The Circle 1	Episode 1	Episode 12	Finalist
Kariselle Snow	27	Sexy Beasts	Episode 1	Episode 12	Finalist
Lauren "LC" Chamblin	31	Love Is Blind 1	Episode 10	Episode 12	Finalist
Nick Uhlenhuth	29	The Circle 3	Episode 1	Episode 5	Finalist
Nick Uhlenhuth	29	The Circle 3	Episode 10	Episode 12	Finalist
Shayne Jansen	33	Love Is Blind 2	Episode 1	Episode 7	Finalist
Shayne Jansen	33	Love Is Blind 2	Episode 9	Episode 12	Finalist
Abbey Humphreys	27	Twentysomethings: Austin	Episode 8	Episode 12	Eliminated
Damian Powers	31	Love Is Blind 1	Episode 5	Episode 11	Eliminated
Francesca Farago	30	Too Hot to Handle 1	Episode 1	Episode 11	Eliminated
Diamond Jack	31	Love Is Blind 1	Episode 8	Episode 9	Eliminated
Ines Tazi	26	The Circle France	Episode 1	Episode 9	Eliminated
Mitchell Eason	23	The Circle 2	Episode 7	Episode 9	Eliminated
Will Richardson	30	The Mole 6	Episode 7	Episode 9	Eliminated
Colony Reeves	31	Selling Tampa	Episode 6	Episode 6	Eliminated
Chase DeMoor	26	Too Hot to Handle 2	Episode 1	Episode 5	Eliminated
Savannah Palacio	26	The Circle 2	Episode 1	Episode 4	Eliminated
Anne-Sophie Petit-Frere	28	Selling Tampa	Episode 1	Episode 4	Eliminated
Calvin Crooks	32	The Circle 3	Episode 1	Episode 2	Eliminated
Zay Wilson	27	The Ultimatum: Marry or Move On 1	Episode 1	Episode 2	Eliminated

=== Relationship status ===
Relationships	Still together?	Notes
Dom Gabriel and Georgia Hassarati	No	Gabriel and Hassarati split soon after filming. As such, they never took their "Perfect Match" honeymoon trip.
Bartise Bowden and Izzy Fairthorne	No	Bowden and Fairthorne split soon after filming.
Chloe Veitch and Shayne Jansen	No	Veitch and Jansen split after the show.
Joey Sasso and Kariselle Snow	No	Sasso and Snow got engaged in the finale. The couple soon split after the show.
LC Chamblin and Nick Uhlenhuth	No	Chamblin and Uhlenhuth split after the show.

=== Future appearances ===
In June 2024, Dom Gabriel returned to the show for season two.

In 2025, Chase DeMoor, Georgia Hassarati and Nick Uhlenhuth appeared on the first season of Battle Camp. Chloe Veitch appeared on the first season of Sneaky Links: Dating After Dark as the host. Gabriel competed on season three of The Traitors Canada.

In 2026, DeMoor competed on the fourth series of Celebrity Ex on the Beach.

== Matching progress ==
Perfect Match
Finalist
Unmatched, but not Eliminated
Unmatched and Eliminated

Episodes	1/2		2/3	4/5	5/6	6/7	7/8	8/9	10	11/12	Final
Compatibility Challenge Winners	(None)	Savannah & Nick	Anne-Sophie & Chase	Francesca & Dom	Kariselle & Joey	Francesca & Damian	Ines & Will	Chloe & Mitchell	Kariselle & Joey	(None)	
The Boardroom Singles	(None)	Calvin; Chase; Damien; Will	Chloe; Daimond; Georgia; Izzy	Bartise; Damien; Mitchell; Will	Abbey; Chloe; Colony; LC	Mitchell; Nick; Will; Zay	Abbey; Anne-Sophie; Diamond; LC	Bartise; Calvin; Shayne; Zay	Chase; Colony; LC; Nick	(None)	
Dom	Francesca	Francesca	Francesca	Georgia	Georgia	Georgia	Georgia	Georgia	Georgia	Georgia	Winners
Georgia	Not in Villa		Chase	Dom	Dom	Dom	Dom	Dom	Dom	Dom	Winners
Bartise	Not in Villa			Izzy	Ines	Unmatched	Eliminated (Episode 7)	Abbey	Abbey	Izzy	Finalists
Izzy	Not in Villa		Shayne	Bartise	Unmatched	Eliminated (Episode 6)				Bartise	Finalists
Chloe	Not in Villa				Shayne	Mitchell	Mitchell	Shayne	Unmatched	Shayne	Finalists
Shayne	Ines	Ines	Izzy	Ines	Chloe	Unmatched	Eliminated (Episode 7)	Chloe	Unmatched	Chloe	Finalists
Joey	Kariselle	Kariselle	Kariselle	Kariselle	Kariselle	Kariselle	Kariselle	Kariselle	Kariselle	Kariselle	Finalists
Kariselle	Joey	Joey	Joey	Joey	Joey	Joey	Joey	Joey	Joey	Joey	Finalists
LC	Not in Villa								Nick	Nick	Finalists
Nick	Savannah	Savannah	Ines	Unmatched	Eliminated (Episode 5)				LC	LC	Finalists
Abbey	Not in Villa						Francesca	Bartise	Bartise	Unmatched	Eliminated (Episode 12)
Francesca	Dom	Dom	Dom	Damian	Damian	Damian	Abbey	Damian	Damian	Unmatched	Eliminated (Episode 11)
Damian	Not in Villa			Francesca	Francesca	Francesca	Ines	Francesca	Francesca	Unmatched	Eliminated (Episode 11)
Ines	Shayne	Shayne	Nick	Shayne	Bartise	Will	Damian	Unmatched	Eliminated (Episode 9)		
Will	Not in Villa					Ines	Diamond	Unmatched	Eliminated (Episode 9)		
Mitchell	Not in Villa					Chloe	Chloe	Unmatched	Eliminated (Episode 9)		
Diamond	Not in Villa						Will	Unmatched	Eliminated (Episode 9)		
Colony	Not in Villa				Unmatched	Eliminated (Episode 6)					
Chase	Not in Villa	Anne-Sophie	Georgia	Unmatched	Eliminated (Episode 5)						
Savannah	Nick	Nick	Unmatched	Eliminated (Episode 4)							
Anne-Sophie	Zay	Chase	Unmatched	Eliminated (Episode 4)							
Calvin	Not in Villa	Unmatched	Eliminated (Episode 2)								
Zay	Anne-Sophie	Unmatched	Eliminated (Episode 2)								
Eliminated	(None)	Calvin, Zay; Failed to match	Anne-Sophie, Savannah; Failed to match	Chase, Nick; Failed to match	Colony, Izzy; Failed to match	Bartise, Shayne; Failed to match	(None)	Diamond, Ines, Mitchell, Will; Failed to match	(None)	Abbey, Damian, Francesca; Failed to match	Dom & Georgia; Most votes to win
Eliminated	(None)	Calvin, Zay; Failed to match	Anne-Sophie, Savannah; Failed to match	Chase, Nick; Failed to match	Colony, Izzy; Failed to match	Bartise, Shayne; Failed to match	(None)	Diamond, Ines, Mitchell, Will; Failed to match	(None)	Abbey, Damian, Francesca; Failed to match	Bariste & Izzy, Chloe & Shayne, Joey & Kariselle, LC & Nick; Fewest votes to win

== Production ==
Filming of Season 1 took place in Playa Bonita, Panama City, Panama, during March 2022, before the third season of Love is Blind and The Mole had aired.

== Episodes ==
No. overall	No. in season	Title	Original release date
1	1	"Love is the End Game"	February 14, 2023
2	2	"It's About the Chase"	February 14, 2023
3	3	"Strike a Match"	February 14, 2023
4	4	"Unfinished Business"	February 14, 2023
5	5	"Blind-Sided"	February 21, 2023
6	6	"Love is Savage"	February 21, 2023
7	7	"Circling Back"	February 21, 2023
8	8	"Mixes and Matches"	February 21, 2023
9	9	"Love It or Leave It"	February 28, 2023
10	10	"Making Waves"	February 28, 2023
11	11	"Back in the Mix"	February 28, 2023
12	12	"Game, Set, Perfect Match"	February 28, 2023
