= Too Hot to Handle season 1 =

Too Hot to Handle
- Season 1
- Promotional poster
- No. of contestants: 14
- Winners: Bryce Hirschberg; Chloe Veitch; David Birtwistle; Francesca Farago; Harry Jowsey; Kelz Dyke; Lydia Clyma; Nicole O'Brien; Rhonda Paul; Sharron Townsend
- No. of episodes: 9

Release
- Original network: Netflix
- Original release: 17 April – 8 May 2020

Season chronology
- Next → Season 2

The first season of Too Hot to Handle was released on Netflix on April 17, 2020. A ninth episode reunion special was released on May 8. It was filmed in Punta Mita, Mexico.

The show revolves around a group of adults – all of whom have a history of primarily engaging in meaningless flings and are unable to form long-lasting relationships – who are placed together in a house for four weeks and must go through various workshops, all while being forbidden from any kissing, sexual contact or masturbation, with the money prize getting reduced any time a rule is broken. All contestants who complete the season share equally in the remaining prize money.

== Cast ==
Cast member	Age	Residence	Entered	Exited	Status	Refs
Bryce Hirschberg	29	Venice, California	Episode 3	Episode 8	Winner	
Chloe Veitch	21	Essex, England	Episode 1	Episode 8	Winner	
David Birtwistle	28	London, England	Episode 1	Episode 8	Winner	
Francesca Farago	27	Vancouver, British Columbia, Canada	Episode 1	Episode 8	Winner	
Harry Jowsey	22	Gold Coast, Queensland, Australia	Episode 1	Episode 8	Winner	
Kelechi "Kelz" Dyke	27	London, England	Episode 1	Episode 8	Winner	
Lydia Clyma	22	Portsmouth, England	Episode 6	Episode 8	Winner	
Nicole O'Brien	23	County Cork, Ireland	Episode 1	Episode 8	Winner	
Rhonda Paul	27	Atlanta, Georgia, United States	Episode 1	Episode 8	Winner	
Sharron Townsend	25	Camden, New Jersey, USA	Episode 1	Episode 8	Winner	
Kori Sampson	23	Plymouth, England	Episode 6	Episode 8	Eliminated	
Madison Wyborny	20	Los Angeles, California, USA	Episode 6	Episode 8	Eliminated	
Matthew Smith	29	Highlands Ranch, Colorado, USA	Episode 1	Episode 6	Quit	
Haley Cureton	20	Jacksonville, Florida, USA	Episode 1	Episode 6	Eliminated	

=== Future appearances by contestant ===
Bryce Hirschberg

- Hirschberg appeared on the fifth season of MTV's Ex on the Beach with Nicole O'Brien.

Chloe Veitch

- Veitch starred on season two of The Circle US.
- She paired up with O'Brien on Celebrity Ghost Trip in 2021.
- In 2022, she competed on Celebrity Hunted.
- In 2023, Veitch starred on the first season of Perfect Match.
- Veitch appeared on E4's The Big Celebrity Detox in 2023.
- She appeared on the third series of Celebrity Ex on the Beach in 2024.
- Veitch hosted the reality show Sneaky Links: Dating After Dark in 2025.

David Birtwistle

- He appeared on the Channel 4 dating show The Love Trap in 2021.

Francesca Farago

- In 2021, Farago appeared on the 27th series of The Only Way Is Essex.
- In 2021, she appeared on the Love Is Blind season one special episodes ("After The Altar") as contestant Damian Powers new dating partner.
- In 2023, Farago starred on the first season of Perfect Match.

Harry Jowsey

- In 2021, he participated on MTV's Match Me If You Can.
- In 2022, he appeared on an episode of Floor Is Lava with season 2 contestant Chase de Moor.
- In 2023, he competed in The Amazing Race Australia 7. He was partnered with Love Island Australia contestant Teddy Briggs and they were eliminated 8th.
- In 2023, he participated on the thirty-second season of Dancing with the Stars. He was partnered with first time pro Rylee Arnold, and they finished in sixth place.
- In 2024, Jowsey starred on the second season of Perfect Match.

Kelz Dyke

- Dyke competed on The Challenge: Spies, Lies & Allies. He was eliminated on episode 2.

Nicole O'Brien

- She paired up with Chloe Veitch Celebrity Ghost Trip in 2021.
- O'Brien starred on the fifth season of MTV's Ex on the Beach with Bryce Hirschberg. She left the beach on episode 12.

Kori Sampson

- He starred on series 2 of Celebrity Ex On The Beach. He left the beach on episode 11, but returned on episode 12.
- He appeared on an episode of Series 2 of Celeb Ex in the City along with Lydia Clyma.

== Episodes ==
No. overall	No. in season	Title	Prize money	Original release date
1	1	"Love, Sex or Money"	$100,000	17 April 2020
2	2	"When Harry Met Francesca"	$97,000	17 April 2020
3	3	"Revenge Is a Dish Best Served Hot"	$94,000	17 April 2020
4	4	"Two's Company, Three's a ... Threesome"	$94,000	17 April 2020
5	5	"Boys to Men"	$75,000	17 April 2020
6	6	"The Bryce Isn't Right"	$55,000	17 April 2020
7	7	"Sisters over Misters"	$43,000	17 April 2020
8	8	"Lust or Bust"	$75,000	17 April 2020
9	9	"Extra Hot: The Reunion"	-	8 May 2020

== After filming ==
Couples	Still together	Relationship notes
Francesca Farago & Harry Jowsey	No	Although the couple ended the season together, it was later revealed that they had split for eight months after filming wrapped. The two reconciled shortly after and got engaged during the reunion special. On June 16, 2020, Farago released a video announcing that the two have broken up. On May 24, 2021, Jowsey published some photos of the two of them together. In the end, they went their separate ways.
Rhonda Paul & Sharron Townsend	No	Although the two ended the season together, the couple eventually split, citing distance as the demise of their relationship. It was revealed the two still keep in contact, but Paul had reconciled with an ex.
Lydia Clyma & David Birtwistle	No	Entering the show in the sixth episode, Clyma struck up a relationship with Birtwistle and the two ended the season together. Birtwistle revealed that they ended their relationship.
Nicole O'Brien & Bryce Hirschberg	No	Hirschberg and O'Brien developed a romantic connection in the days after the show wrapped. The two split in May 2020 after attempts at a long-distance relationship failed.

Harry Jowsey began dating season 3 contestant Georgia Hassarati in early 2022, but ended their relationship in the fall of the same year. They got back together in April 2023, but broke up again a few months later.
