= Love Is Blind season 3 =

Love Is Blind
- Season 3
- Presented by: Nick Lachey; Vanessa Lachey
- No. of episodes: 15

Release
- Original network: Netflix
- Original release: October 19, 2022 – February 10, 2023

Season chronology
- ← Previous; Season 2 Next → Season 4

The third season of Love Is Blind premiered on Netflix on October 19, 2022, and concluded on November 9, 2022, with a reunion episode released on the same date. A three-part companion piece entitled After the Altar was released on February 10, 2023. The season followed singles from Dallas, Texas.

== Season summary ==
Couples	Married	Still together	Relationship notes
Alexa and Brennon	Yes	No	Married in Summer 2021. They announced on January 26, 2024, that they are expecting their first child in summer 2024. Their daughter was born in July. In December 2025, the couple announced they were getting divorced.
Colleen and Matt	Yes	No	Married in Summer 2021. Announced their separation in May 2025.
Zanab and Cole	No	No	Split on their wedding day after Zanab said no. Both are single as of February 2025.
Raven and SK	No	No	SK said no on their wedding day. The couple dated for a while after the show and SK proposed again but they announced their split in November 2022. Both are single as of February 2025.
Nancy and Bartise	No	No	Split on their wedding day after Bartise said no; Nancy said yes. Bartise announced on April 7, 2023, that he is now the father to a baby boy. Both are single as of February 2025.

== Participants ==
All the participants lived in Dallas at the time of filming.

Name	Age	Occupation	Relationship Status
Alexa Alfia	29	Insurance Manager	Married June 2021; Divorced 2025
Brennon Lemieux	32	Sales Manager	Married June 2021; Divorced 2025
Colleen Reed	25	Ballet Dancer and Digital PR Strategist	Married June 2021; Separated May 2025
Matt Bolton	27	VP of Aerospace Manufacturing & Co.	Married June 2021; Separated May 2025
Zanab Jaffrey	31	Flight Attendant	Split at the wedding
Cole Barnett	26	Realtor	Split at the wedding
Raven Ross	27	Pilates Instructor	Split at the wedding
Sikiru "SK" Alagbada	34	Data Engineer	Split at the wedding
Nancy Rodriguez	31	Speech Pathologist and Real Estate Investor	Split at the wedding
Bartise Bowden	25	Accountant	Split at the wedding
Andrew Liu	29	Consultant	Not engaged
Anthony LaScalea	33	Attorney	Not engaged
Jess Gumbert	30	Senior Event Producer	Not engaged
Amanda Peterson	31	Stylist	Not engaged
Ashley Randermann	29	Chiropractor and Equestrian	Not engaged
Brannigan Max	35	Critical Care Nurse	Not engaged
Charita Scott	35	Makeup Artist	Not engaged
Chelsey Jordan	27	Customer Success Manager	Not engaged
Dakota Easley	29	Aerospace Engineer	Not engaged
Dale Dalida	32	Cybersecurity Student	Not engaged
DaVonté Black	29	Fitness Development Coach	Not engaged
Julian Torres	34	Managing Director of Operations	Not engaged
Kalekia Adams	31	ICU Nurse Practitioner	Not engaged
Kim Clarke	30	Teacher and Coach	Not engaged
Loren Langenbeck	36	Medical Device Representative	Not engaged
Nash Buehler	34	Realtor	Not engaged
Simmer Bajwa	27	Director of Marketing Technology	Not engaged
Tony Taylor	34	Medical Device Sales Representative	Not engaged
Valerie Truong	35	Dermatologist	Not engaged
Zach Gordon	29	Chiropractic Student and Interior Quality Control Manager	Not engaged

=== Future appearances ===
In 2023, Bartise Bowden appeared on the first season of Perfect Match, finishing as a finalist.

== Episodes ==
Love Is Blind season 1 episodes
No. overall	No. in season	Title	Original release date
Week 1
29	1	"Welcome to Love Is Blind!"	October 19, 2022
30	2	"Love Triangles and Love Triumphs"	October 19, 2022
31	3	"The First Night Together"	October 19, 2022
32	4	"Meet Your Exes"	October 19, 2022
Week 2
33	5	"Trouble in Paradise"	October 26, 2022
34	6	"Return to Reality"	October 26, 2022
35	7	"Impress the Parents"	October 26, 2022
Week 3
36	8	"The Perfect Fit"	November 2, 2022
37	9	"The Last Supper"	November 2, 2022
38	10	"Approaching the Altar"	November 2, 2022
Week 4
39	11	"The Wedding Day"	November 9, 2022
40	12	"The Reunion"	November 9, 2022
After the Altar
41	13	"Soulmates and Blank Slates"	February 10, 2023
42	14	"The Party Is Just Getting Started"	February 10, 2023
43	15	"A Second Shot at Love?"	February 10, 2023
