= Too Hot to Handle season 2 =

Too Hot to Handle
- Season 2
- Promotional poster
- No. of contestants: 15
- Winner: Marvin Anthony
- Runner-up: Cam Holmes
- No. of episodes: 10

Release
- Original network: Netflix
- Original release: 23 June – 30 June 2021

Season chronology
- ← Previous; Season 1 Next → Season 3

The second season of Too Hot to Handle premiered on 23 June 2021, and concluded on 30 June 2021. The season was ordered by Netflix in January 2021, with filming underway concurrently amid the COVID-19 pandemic on the Turks and Caicos Islands.

== Cast ==
Cast member	Age	Residence	Entered	Exited	Status	Refs
Marvin Anthony	26	Paris, France	Episode 1	Episode 10	Winner	
Cam Holmes	24	Newport, Wales	Episode 1	Episode 10	Runner-up	
Carly Lawrence	24	Toronto, Ontario, Canada	Episode 1	Episode 10	Third place	
Chase DeMoor	24	Seattle, Washington, United States	Episode 1	Episode 10	Finalist	
Elle Monae	25	Washington, D.C., USA	Episode 6	Episode 10	Finalist	
Emily Miller	27	London, England	Episode 1	Episode 10	Finalist	
Joey Joy	23	Miami, Florida, USA	Episode 6	Episode 10	Finalist	
Melinda Melrose	28	New York City, USA	Episode 1	Episode 10	Finalist	
Nathan Webb	27	Dallas, Texas, USA	Episode 1	Episode 10	Finalist	
Tabitha Clifft	22	London, England	Episode 6	Episode 10	Finalist	
Larissa Trownson	28	Auckland, New Zealand	Episode 1	Episode 8	Quit	
Christina Carmela	30	Cape Town, South Africa	Episode 4	Episode 8	Eliminated	
Robert Van Tromp	29	London, England	Episode 4	Episode 8	Eliminated	
Kayla Carter	24	Jacksonville, Florida, USA	Episode 1	Episode 5	Eliminated	
Peter Vigilante	21	New York City, USA	Episode 1	Episode 5	Eliminated	

=== Future appearances ===
Chase DeMoor starred on Floor Is Lava along with season 1 contestant Harry Jowsey. DeMoor and Melinda Melrose also starred on Netflix’s Reality Games and were 2 of 4 players representing team "Too Hot to Handle", and both starred on the second season of All Star Shore. Melrose hosted Dated & Related.

DeMoor competed on the first season of Perfect Match, and the first season of Battle Camp.

In 2024, Melrose competed on the second season of Perfect Match.

In 2025, Marvin Anthony competed on season two of Love Island Games.

== Episodes ==
No. overall	No. in season	Title	Prize money	Original release date
10	1	"C**kblocked by a Cone"	$100,000	23 June 2021
11	2	"You Gotta Watch Out for Pete"	$79,000	23 June 2021
12	3	"On Est dans la Merde"	$73,000	23 June 2021
13	4	"Resist Everything… Except Temptation"	$68,000	23 June 2021
14	5	"An Offer You Can't Refuse"	$68,000	30 June 2021
15	6	"Give Up the Chase"	$60,000	30 June 2021
16	7	"Misters over Sisters"	$40,000	30 June 2021
17	8	"Money Down the Drain"	$30,000	30 June 2021
18	9	"Green Lights and Hot Nights"	$55,000	30 June 2021
19	10	"I Did Not See That Coming"	$55,000	30 June 2021

== After filming ==
Couples	Still together	Relationship notes
Emily Miller & Cam Holmes	Yes	The two coupled up into a relationship immediately when entering the villa, and despite some challenges the two have faced they remained strong and ended the season together. On the reunion special, it was revealed the two had moved in together. On 1 January 2024 they announced they are expecting their first child together. Their son Reggie was born in June 2024. They got engaged in October 2025. They are now expecting twins.
Melinda Melrose & Marvin Anthony	No	Although the two ended the season together, the couple eventually split. At the reunion, Melrose and Anthony revealed they had plans to meet in Mexico, which were derailed by a fight they had. Since then, they have gone their separate ways but claimed the split is amicable, including admitting they still love one another. They seemed to indicate they weren't writing off the relationship completely, when Anthony teased: "I don't know what is going to happen, we will see."
Tabitha Clifft & Chase DeMoor	No	After entering the show in the sixth episode, Clifft struck up a relationship with DeMoor, although the couple eventually split. On the reunion special, Clifft revealed that Chase had sent her flowers and chocolate. She also shared she had received a love letter from him but was not willing to share the intimate details.
Carly Lawrence & Joey Joy	No	Lawrence and Joy hit it off straight away when he arrived in the villa. After the show, they visited each other on several occasions. They both dodged questions about their relationship when it was asked at the reunion, but have been seen together in Miami, and active on each other's social media pages. They broke up in August 2021.
Larissa Trownson & Nathan Webb	No	Trownson and Webb were coupled up, but broke up on the show after Webb's head turned when new girl Elle arrived. Trownson ended up leaving halfway through the season. At the reunion, Trownson revealed she had moved on from Webb, but had received some NSFW messages from him since the show ended. As for Webb, he has given up his stripper career and said he was happy "just doing me."
Christina Carmela & Robert Van Tromp	No	Van Tromp and Carmela's relationship seemed to be going from strength to strength, until they were both kicked off the show. At the reunion, Carmela revealed Van Tromp flew to South Africa after the show ended. She said: "We were on something crazy together, it just brought us so close and it was something we shared." They later posted on their Instagrams that they were still together. Van Tromp announced in September 2021 they broke up.
