= The Circle (American TV series) season 3 =

The Circle
- Season 3
- Promotional poster
- Presented by: Michelle Buteau
- No. of days: 15
- No. of contestants: 13
- Winner: James Andre Jefferson Jr.
- Runner-up: Matthew Pappadia
- Fan Favorite: Keisha "Kai" Ghost
- No. of episodes: 13

Release
- Original network: Netflix
- Original release: September 8 – September 29, 2021

Season chronology
- ← Previous; Season 2 Next → Season 4

The third season of the American reality competition streaming series The Circle began on Netflix on September 8, 2021, and concluded on September 29, 2021. The season was announced in March 2020 when Netflix renewed The Circle for a second and third season. Michelle Buteau returned as host.

Like the previous seasons, players compete against each other to become the most popular, but do not actually meet their competitors. Instead, they communicate through a specially designed app and are able to portray themselves in any way they choose. In August 2021 ahead of the season premiere, the series was renewed for a fourth and fifth season.

On September 29, 2021, the season was won by James Andre Jefferson Jr., who had played the game as himself, and won the US$100,000 prize that came along with it. Matthew Pappadia as "Ashley" was the runner-up. Keisha "Kai" Ghost won the Fan Favorite award and US$10,000.

== Format ==
The contestants, or "players", move into the same apartment building. However, the contestants do not meet face-to-face during the course of the competition, as they each live in their own individual apartment. They communicate solely using their profiles on a specially designed social media app that gives them the ability to portray themselves in any way they choose. Players can thus opt to present themselves as a completely different personality to the other players, a tactic otherwise known as catfishing.

Throughout the series, the contestants "rate" one another from first to last place. At the end of the ratings, their average ratings are revealed to one another from lowest to highest. Normally, the two highest-rated players become "Influencers", while the remaining players will be at risk of being "blocked" by the Influencers. However, occasionally there may be a twist to the blocking process – varying from the lowest rating players being instantly blocked, the identity of the Influencers being a secret, or multiple players being blocked at one time. Blocked players are eliminated from the game, but are given the opportunity to meet one player still in the game in-person. A video message is shown to the remaining players to reveal if they were real or fake the day after.

During the finale, the contestants rate each other one final time, where the highest rated player wins the game and US$100,000. Also, fans of The Circle are able to vote for their favorite player. The player that receives the most votes is known as the Fan Favorite and receives US$10,000.

== Players ==
Name	Age	Hometown	Playing as		Entered	Exited	Status
Michelle Rider	52	Pacolet, South Carolina	Herself		Episode 1	Episode 3	Blocked
Ava Marie Capra	25	The Bronx, New York	Ava, but not revealing the presence of her sister Chanel in the game	A clone of "Michelle"	Episode 1	Episode 5	Blocked
Chanel Marie Capra	42	The Bronx, New York	Ava, but not revealing the presence of her sister Chanel in the game	A clone of "Michelle"	Episode 1	Episode 5	Blocked
Calvin Kiing Crooks	30	Miami, Florida	Himself		Episode 1	Episode 7	Blocked
Rachel Ward	24	Los Angeles, California	"Jackson", her best friend's boyfriend		Episode 3	Episode 9	Blocked
Ruksana Carroll	35	Union, New Jersey	Herself		Episode 1	Episode 9	Blocked
Daniel Cusimano	20	Palm Harbor, Florida	Himself		Episode 1	Episode 11	Blocked
Jacki Jing	33	Los Angeles, California	Herself		Episode 9	Episode 12	Blocked
Nick Uhlenhuth	27	Louisville, Kentucky	Himself, but as a drummer		Episode 1	Episode 13	Fifth place
Nick Uhlenhuth	27	Louisville, Kentucky	"Vince", a ghost hunter (Note: After being blocked in episode 7, Calvin picked another player to receive an advantage. He chose to give it to Nick, who received a "burner" account named Vince which is controlled by Nick, but appears to be a different account to other players. Vince was deactivated in episode 9.)		Episode 1	Episode 13	Fifth place
Keisha "Kai" Ghost	30	Nashville, Tennessee	Herself		Episode 1	Episode 13	Fourth place
Sophia Layne	22	Fort Walton Beach, Florida	"Isabella", her older sister		Episode 3	Episode 13	Third place
Matthew Pappadia	29	Long Island, New York	"Ashley", his best friend, but bisexual		Episode 1	Episode 13	Runner-up
James Andre Jefferson Jr.	30	Los Angeles, California	Himself, but single		Episode 6	Episode 13	Winner

=== Future appearances ===
==== Perfect Match ====
In 2023, Calvin Crooks and Nick Uhlenhuth competed on the first season of Perfect Match Crooks was eliminated in Episode Two. Uhlenhuth finished as a finalist alongside LC Chamblin.

==== Battle Camp ====
Nick Uhlenhuth competed on the first season of Battle Camp. He was eliminated tenth.

==== Other ====
Rachel Ward appeared on the comedy game show Game Changer, appearing as a suitor in a Bachelor-themed episode.

== Episodes ==
No. overall	No. in season	Title	Day(s)	Original release date	Prod. code	Ref.
Week 1
26	1	"Circle, Did You Miss Me?"	Day 1	September 8, 2021	TC-301	
The first eight players (Matt, Calvin, Nick, Kai, Ruksana, Michelle, Daniel & Ava & Chanel) enter the apartment building and create their profiles.: Game ("Ice Breaker"): Players answer multiple choice questions regarding serious and non-serious questions. Their choices are then revealed to the others.; The players rate each other based on first impressions from first to seventh. Calvin & Kai place in the top two spots, however The Circle reveals that Kai would be the sole influencer. She ultimately decides to block Ava & Chanel from The Circle.
27	2	"A New Twist"	Days 1-2	September 8, 2021	TC-302	
Ava & Chanel are given the opportunity to clone another player to continue playing the game, they ultimately choose Michelle and re-enter The Circle as "Blue Michelle" leaving the original Michelle as "Orange Michelle". The Players have 1 day to decide which Michelle to keep in The Circle.: Game ("This Is Me"): Each Michelle has to give a background story to a photo from the real Michelle's past.
28	3	"Identity Theft"	Days 2-3	September 8, 2021	TC-303	
Orange Michelle is blocked with a unanimous vote. Before leaving, she is able to visit another player and chooses to visit Blue Michelle. Later, two new players ("Isabella" & "Jackson") enter The Circle and are able to talk to each other before meeting everyone else.: Game ("Flashback Photos"): The players viewed pictures from each other. While also introducing Isabella & Jackson to the other players.; Isabella & Jackson settle into The Circle, Jackson starts a private chat with Kai and flirts with her.: Game ("Flashback Quiz"): "Isabella" & "Jackson" answer trivia questions, with each correct response they gain invites to the "Circle Flashback Party". This leads to a limited amount of invites, with Daniel, Calvin & Ruksana not being invited to the party.
29	4	"A Flirtatious Alliance"	Days 3-4	September 8, 2021	TC-304	
The players rated each other from first to sixth. New players "Isabella" & "Jackson" rate the others but cannot be rated.: Game ("Honest Reviews"): Each player chooses another player and anonymously reviews them.; After the game, the players' ratings are revealed: Kai places second while Ruksana places first. Both influencers chat at the hangout and decide who to block.
Week 2
30	5	"The Real Michelle"	Days 4-5	September 15, 2021	TC-305	
Kai visits Michelle after deciding alongside Ruksana to block her, learning that she is not the real Michelle and is instead Ava & Chanel. Later, the players learn that Orange Michelle was the real Michelle, and that Blue Michelle was the clone, after both give their goodbye messages.: Game ("Head To Head"): Hosted by rapper Lil Yachty, the players write a rap diss track directed at each other.
31	6	"A New Member of the Wolfpack"	Days 5-7	September 15, 2021	TC-306	
New player James enters The Circle. He is tasked with inviting the other players to a chat one by one: his first pick is Kai, while his last pick is Nick. Later, the players are tasked to rate each other, James can rate but cannot be rated. Isabella and Ashley become influencers.
32	7	"Shock Blocking"	Days 7-8	September 15, 2021	TC-307	
Ashley and Isabella reveal to the other players that they have decided to block Calvin. Before leaving, Calvin visits Kai, and then picks Nick as the receiver of a secret advantage: a second profile. "Vince" joins The Circle with Nick now playing two different profiles. The players participate in "The Circle Camping Trip".
33	8	"Full Out War"	Days 8-9	September 15, 2021	TC-308	
Game ("Bake For Your Bestie"): Players are tasked with baking a cake for their "Circle Bestie".; The players rate each other from first to seventh (as a new player, Vince rates the others, but cannot be rated): Nick places first, while Daniel places second. They both get to choose one player to block.
Week 3
34	9	"Ghostbusting & Catfishing"	Days 9-10	September 22, 2021	TC-309	
The influencers' choices to block are revealed: Daniel decides to block Jackson, while Nick decides to block Ruksana. "Jackson" visits Nick, revealing herself to actually be Rachel. Nick confides with Rachel that "Vince" is his burner profile, received as a parting gift from Calvin. Meanwhile, Ruksana visits Daniel. In the morning, "Vince" is removed from the game right before the Circle reveals to all remaining players it was a burner profile handled by an existing player. New player Jacki joins the game.: Game ("Circle of Fortune"): A virtual roulette wheel determines the topics of four questions, which Jacki (having been given the role of game host) chooses a player to answer. During the game, James states that he suspects Isabella of being a catfish.
35	10	"A Circle Divided"	Days 10-11	September 22, 2021	TC-310	
James brings Jacki up to speed on what has happened in The Circle in the time he has been there. The two main alliances left in The Circle (James, Kai and Daniel on one side; Nick, Ashley and Isabella on the other) each try to bring Jacki to their side before the other alliance does, resulting in her receiving simultaneous group chat invites from the two trios and choosing James's group over Nick's. Jacki later explains the situation to Nick to clear the air with him. After being the top two players in the latest ratings, James and Nick become influencers, having to choose one player to block.
36	11	"Choosing Sides"	Days 11-12	September 22, 2021	TC-311	
James and Nick decide to block Daniel. When Daniel is allowed to visit a player, he chooses Isabella (Sophia) who shares her story with him. After the circle votes for the yearbook, there was a circle prom. At the circle prom the players all told their plans for the money if they were to win.: Game ("Circle Yearbook"): The players vote for various yearbook categories. Class Hottie, Class Clown, Circle MVP.
37	12	"The Final Stretch"	Days 13-14	September 22, 2021	TC-312	
The circle members all received messages from home. Nick, Kai, and James discussed a final three agreement in a group check. Players were allowed to ask one savage question of another player anonymously. The final rating/blocking is decided by secret influencers, James and Nick. They choose to block Jacki and James delivers the information in person.
Week 4
38	13	"Finale"	Day 15	September 29, 2021	TC-313	
The players are treated to spa baskets as they chat in their circle chat and get ready for the final ranking. Players now must decide whether to vote strategically or with their hearts. After voting, they are invited to their final circle chat - in person. Nick is stunned when he meets Isabella (Sophia). The entire group admits they were fooled by Ashley (Matthew). Everyone goes to the penthouse to reunite with the previously blocked cast members and the winner is crowned.

== Results and elimination ==
Color key
The contestant was blocked.
The contestant was an influencer.
The contestant was immune from being blocked.
The player was at risk of being blocked following a twist
This player was blocked, but returned under a different profile

		Episode 1	Episode 3	Episode 4	Episode 6	Episode 8	Episode 10	Episode 12	Episode 13	
James		Not in The Circle			Exempt	4th	1st	Not published	Winner (Episode 13)	
Matthew "Ashley"		=4th	Michelle to block	=5th	1st	3rd	4th	Not published	Runner-up (Episode 13)	
Sophia "Isabella"		Not in The Circle		Exempt	2nd	7th	6th	Not published	Third Place (Episode 13)	
Kai		1st	Michelle to block	2nd	3rd	8th	3rd	Not published	Fourth Place (Episode 13)	
Nick		=4th	Michelle to block	3rd	4th	1st	2nd	Not published	Fifth Place (Episode 13)	
Jacki		Not in The Circle					Exempt	Not published	Blocked (Episode 12)	
Daniel		3rd	Michelle to block	4th	7th	2nd	5th	Blocked (Episode 11)		
Ruksana		7th	Michelle to block	1st	6th	6th	Blocked (Episode 9)			
Rachel "Jackson"		Not in The Circle		Exempt	8th	5th	Blocked (Episode 9)			
Calvin		2nd	Michelle to block	=5th	5th	Blocked (Episode 7)				
Ava & Chanel "Ava"	"Michelle"	6th	Not eligible	7th	Blocked (Episode 4)					
Michelle		8th	Not eligible	Blocked (Episode 3)						
Notes		1, 2	2, 3	none		4, 5	none	6	7	
Influencer(s)		Kai	none	Kai, Ruksana	Matthew, Sophia	Daniel, Nick	James, Nick	James, Nick	none	
Blocked		Ava & Chanel "Ava"; Sole Influencer's choice to block	Michelle; 6 of 6 votes to block	Ava & Chanel "Michelle"; Influencers' choice to block	Calvin; Influencers' choice to block	Rachel "Jackson"; Daniel's choice to block	Daniel; Influencers' choice to block	Jacki; Secret Influencers' choice to block	Nick; Lowest rated player	Kai; Fourth highest rated player
Blocked		Ava & Chanel "Ava"; Sole Influencer's choice to block	Michelle; 6 of 6 votes to block	Ava & Chanel "Michelle"; Influencers' choice to block	Calvin; Influencers' choice to block	Ruksana; Nick's choice to block	Daniel; Influencers' choice to block	Jacki; Secret Influencers' choice to block	Sophia "Isabella"; Third highest rated player	Matthew "Ashley"; Second highest rated player
Blocked		Ava & Chanel "Ava"; Sole Influencer's choice to block	Michelle; 6 of 6 votes to block	Ava & Chanel "Michelle"; Influencers' choice to block	Calvin; Influencers' choice to block	Ruksana; Nick's choice to block	Daniel; Influencers' choice to block	Jacki; Secret Influencers' choice to block	James; Highest rated player	

=== Notes ===
- ^Note 1 : After the ratings were revealed, the players were alerted that Kai would be the sole influencer and must block someone by herself. She ended up choosing Ava.
- ^Note 2 : After Ava was blocked, Ava and Chanel were given a second chance to play but had to clone another player, and ended up choosing to clone Michelle.
- ^Note 3 : Both Michelle's were at risk of being blocked. The other players were tasked with voting one to be blocked, and the Michelle with the most votes was blocked from The Circle.
- ^Note 4 : After being blocked in Episode 7, Calvin had to choose one player to give a secret advantage to. Calvin chose Nick, giving him the power of a second profile known as "Vince", although he still kept his original profile.
- ^Note 5 : In Episode 9, "Vince" was revealed to be the second profile of an existing player and removed from the game.
- ^Note 6 : The players' ratings were not revealed, instead the top two players would become secret influencers. James & Nick both placed the highest.
- ^Note 7 : The players made their final ratings.
