= The Circle (American TV series) season 5 =

The Circle Singles
- Season 5
- Promotional poster
- Presented by: Michelle Buteau
- No. of days: 13
- No. of contestants: 13
- Winner: Sam Carmona
- Runner-up: Chaz Lawery
- No. of episodes: 13

Release
- Original network: Netflix
- Original release: December 28, 2022 – January 18, 2023

Season chronology
- ← Previous; Season 4 Next → Season 6

The fifth season of the American reality competition streaming series The Circle premiered on Netflix on December 28, 2022. Michelle Buteau returned as host. The season is the first to have a subtitle, known as The Circle Singles. Players compete without ever actually meeting in person; they communicate through a simulated social media interface, portraying themselves in any way they choose.

== Format ==
The players move into the same apartment building. However, the contestants do not meet face-to-face during the course of the competition, as they each live in their own individual apartment. They communicate solely using their profiles on a specially designed social media app that gives them the ability to portray themselves in any way they choose. Players can thus opt to present themselves as a completely different personality to the other players, a tactic otherwise known as catfishing.

Throughout the series, the contestants "rate" one another from first to last place. At the end of the ratings, their average ratings are revealed to one another from lowest to highest. Normally, the two highest-rated players become "Influencers", while the remaining players will be at risk of being "blocked" by the Influencers. However, occasionally there may be a twist to the blocking process – varying from the lowest rating players being instantly blocked, the identity of the Influencers being a secret, or multiple players being blocked at one time. Blocked players are eliminated from the game, but are given the opportunity to meet one player still in the game in-person. Then, the day after a blocking, a video message is shown to the remaining players to reveal if they were real or fake.

During the finale, the contestants rate each other one final time, where the highest rated player wins the game and US$100,000.

== Production ==
=== Development and release ===
The season was announced on August 9, 2021 when Netflix renewed The Circle for a fourth and fifth season prior the premiere of the third season. Michelle Buteau, who hosted the first four seasons, returned for the fifth.

=== Casting and filming ===
Filming for the season took place directly after principal photography for the fourth season, in Fall 2021 at an apartment complex in Manchester, England. The same complex that was used during previous seasons and other versions of the series. The apartment complex is prepared with twelve furnished and ready-to-use apartments for the players to live in.

After the third season began airing, casting for the fourth and fifth seasons opened on April 12, 2021. The initial members of the cast were revealed on December 9, 2022.

== Players ==
For the first time in the history of the show, the casting process only included those who consider themselves not in a relationship or those who want to portray themselves as not in a relationship. The first twelve contestants were announced on December 9, 2022. Among the cast is Brett Robinson, a contestant from Big Brother 20, the first deaf contestant Raven Sutton and her interpreter Paris McTizic and the first returning player, with season one runner-up Shubham Goel.

Marvin Achi was revealed as a contestant prematurely after being removed from the cast of Big Brother 24, after failing to inform the producers of Big Brother that he had competed on The Circle. He had also participated in America's Got Talent.

The Circle Season 5 contestants
Name	Age (Note: Ages stated are at start of game)	Playing as		Entered	Exited	Status	Ref.
Sam Carmona	34	Herself		Episode 1	Episode 13	Winner	
Chaz Lawery	28	Himself, but a nurse and single		Episode 1	Episode 13	Runner-up	
Raven Sutton	26	Herself, with her friend Paris as her interpreter		Episode 1	Episode 13	Third place	
Paris McTizic	-	Herself, with her friend Paris as her interpreter		Episode 1	Episode 13	Third place	
Tasia Lesley	28	"Tamira", a 22-year-old cosmetologist		Episode 5	Episode 13	Fourth place	
Brett Robinson	28	Himself	"Jennifer", (Note: After being blocked in the first episode, Brett and Xanthi were given the opportunity to join forces and portray "Jennifer" as a second chance.) a 51 year-old single dog trainer	Episode 1	Episode 13	Fifth place	
Xanthi Perdikomatis	25	Herself, but listing occupation as "Pre-School Teacher"	"Jennifer", a 51 year-old single dog trainer	Episode 1	Episode 13	Fifth place	
Oliver Twixt	26	Himself		Episode 7	Episode 13	Blocked	
Tom Houghton	36	Himself, but single		Episode 2	Episode 12	Blocked	
Marvin Achi	27	Himself, but listing occupation as "Personal Trainer"		Episode 1	Episode 11	Blocked	
Shubham Goel	26	"Sasha", a 23-year-old blogger		Episode 5	Episode 8	Blocked	
Billie-Jean Blackett	25	"Bruno", her ex		Episode 1	Episode 6	Blocked	
Brian Clark	47	"Brittney", his daughter		Episode 1	Episode 4	Blocked	

=== Future appearances ===
In 2023, Marvin Achi appeared in the first season of the joint Nigerian/South African edition of Big Brother, titled Big Brother Titans representing Nigeria.

In 2024, Xanthi Perdikomatis appeared on the second season of Perfect Match.

== Episodes ==
No. overall	No. in season	Title	Day(s)	Original release date	Prod. code	Ref.
Week 1
52	1	"Single and Ready To Mingle"	Day 1	December 28, 2022	TC-501	TBA
The first four players; Xanthi who is a model portraying herself as a preschool teacher, Brian who is playing as his daughter Brittany, Brett, and Raven who is with her interpreter Paris. After entering The Circle and creating their profiles, the first four players met for the first time via circle chat. Afterwards, the last four players entered; Marvin who is portraying himself as a personal trainer, Sam, Chaz and Billie-Jean who is portraying her ex Bruno. Shortly after entering, the four new players entered the circle chat with the rest of the cast. The players are tasked with rating each other for the first time. After the ratings are complete, the players participate in game entitled "Who Are You?", answering questions about their personalities. The players spend the remainder of the day chatting with one another privately, until being forced by the Circle to publicly state who each player would block if they were an influencer with whoever the influencers' chose being blocked from the game. Being an influencer, Raven chose Brett, blocking him from the Circle.
53	2	"An Unlikely Team Emerges"	Days 1-2	December 28, 2022	TC-502	TBA
Chaz chose Xanthi, blocking her from the Circle. After being blocked, Brett and Xanthi are given a second chance to play together as "Jennifer". The next morning, the players receive video messages from Xanthi and Brett and the results of the previous nights ratings. A skeptical Sam, who placed last during the ratings, begins chatting with each player to question why she was rated the way she was. New player Tom enters the Circle, alongside Brett & Xanthi/Jennifer. The players participate in "Talk Flirty to Me", a game, which ultimately ends with Brett & Xanthi/Jennifer inviting Tom on a "date".
54	3	"I Can’t Believe I Just Sent That…"	Day 3	December 28, 2022	TC-503	TBA
The male players and the female players spend the morning in separate group chats. The players are tasked with playing a game of Truth or Dare which ultimately leads to a shift of suspicion towards Brian/Brittany, which Brett & Xanthi/Jennifer initiated. Raven starts a private one-on-one chat with Marvin, with Raven developing a crush on the latter. The players are later tasked with rating one another and later partake in a party. The ratings are revealed to the players, with Brian/Brittany in last place and Chaz and Raven in the top two influencer spots.
55	4	"Who to Save?"	Days 3-4	December 28, 2022	TC-504	TBA
Prior to their influencer discussion, Chaz and Raven were tasked with saving a player of their choice. Ultimately, Chaz chose to save Sam and Raven chose to save Marvin. The players later partake in "Single Pringles", a game where the players must create a dating profile for another player. Chaz and Raven meet in the hangout to discuss who they should block, and with only two options (Brian/Brittany and Billie-Jean/Bruno) they ultimately decide to block Brian/Brittany. Brian/Brittany visits a shocked Raven before exiting the Circle for good.
Week 2
56	5	"Hi Old Friend"	Days 4-5	January 4, 2023	TC-505	TBA
New players Shubham and Tasia who are playing as "Sasha" and "Tamira" respectively, enter the Circle and create their profiles.
57	6	"A Desperate Alliance"	Days 5-6	January 4, 2023	TC-506	TBA
58	7	"Glam Party Twist"	Days 6-7	January 4, 2023	TC-507	TBA
59	8	"An F-Boy Is Exposed"	Days 7-8	January 4, 2023	TC-508	TBA
Week 3
60	9	"Return of the Inner Circle"	Days 8-9	January 11, 2023	TC-509	TBA
61	10	"The Hunt for the Hacker"	Days 9-10	January 11, 2023	TC-510	TBA
62	11	"Circle Power Couple"	Days 10-11	January 11, 2023	TC-511	TBA
63	12	"A Brutal Blocking"	Days 11-12	January 11, 2023	TC-512	TBA
Week 4
64	13	"Finale"	Days 12-13	January 18, 2023	TC-513	TBA

== Results and elimination ==
Color key
The contestant was blocked.
The contestant was an influencer.
The contestant was immune from being blocked.
The player was at risk of being blocked following a twist
This player was blocked, but returned under a different profile

Episodes		1	3	6	8	10	12	Final	
Influencer(s)		Raven, Chaz	Chaz, Raven	Shubham	Tom, Chaz	Raven, Sam	Chaz	none	
Sam		8th	3rd	Voted for Tamira	5th	2nd	Not published	Winner (Episode 13)	
Chaz		2nd	1st	Voted for Tamira	2nd	3rd	Not published	Runner-up (Episode 13)	
Raven		1st	2nd	Voted for Tamira	4th	1st	Not published	Third Place (Episode 13)	
Tasia "Tamira"		Not in The Circle		Exempt	6th	8th	Not published	Fourth place (Episode 13)	
Brett	"Jennifer"	5th	Exempt	Voted for Sasha	3rd	6th	Not published	Fifth Place (Episode 13)	
Xanthi	"Jennifer"	7th	Exempt	Voted for Sasha	3rd	6th	Not published	Fifth Place (Episode 13)	
Oliver		Not in The Circle			Exempt	4th	Not published	Blocked (Episode 13)	
Tom		Not in The Circle	Exempt	Voted for Tamira	1st	5th	7th	Blocked (Episode 12)	
Marvin		4th	4th	Voted for Tamira	8th	7th	Blocked (Episode 11)		
Shubham "Sasha"		Not in The Circle		Exempt	7th	Blocked (Episode 8)			
Billie-Jean "Bruno"		3rd	5th	Voted for Sasha	Blocked (Episode 6)				
Brian "Brittney"		6th	6th	Blocked (Episode 4)					
Notes		1,2	3	4	none		5	6	
Blocked		Brett; Raven's choice to block	Brian "Brittney"; Influencers' choice to block	Billie-Jean "Bruno"; Shubham's choice to block	Shubham "Sasha"; Influencers' choice to block	Marvin; Influencers' choice to block	Tom; Lowest- rated player	Brett & Xanthi "Jennifer"; Lowest rated player	Tasia "Tamira"; Fourth highest rated player
Blocked		Xanthi; Chaz's choice to block	Brian "Brittney"; Influencers' choice to block	Billie-Jean "Bruno"; Shubham's choice to block	Shubham "Sasha"; Influencers' choice to block	Marvin; Influencers' choice to block	Oliver; Superinfluencer's choice to block	Raven; Third highest rated player	Chaz; Second highest rated player
Blocked		Xanthi; Chaz's choice to block	Brian "Brittney"; Influencers' choice to block	Billie-Jean "Bruno"; Shubham's choice to block	Shubham "Sasha"; Influencers' choice to block	Marvin; Influencers' choice to block	Oliver; Superinfluencer's choice to block	Sam; Highest rated player	

Notes

- ^Note 1: Prior to the ratings reveal, each player was tasked with stating who they would block from the Circle if they were an influencer. Being in the top two spots, Raven chose Brett while Chaz chose Xanthi, forcing Brett and Xanthi to be blocked from the Circle.
- ^Note 2: After being blocked, Brett and Xanthi were given an opportunity to return to the game under a new profile known as "Jennifer".
- ^Note 3: Prior to their influencer discussion, Chaz chose to save Sam and Raven chose to save Marvin from elimination.
- ^Note 4: "Sasha" and "Tamira" competed in a mission to gain more followers; Tamira and her group won, gaining immunity from the blocking , while Sasha was forced to block one of the remaining players .
- ^Note 5: The players' ratings were not revealed, instead the highest rated player would become a superinfluencer. Chaz placed the highest.
- ^Note 6: The players made their final ratings.
