= The Circle (American TV series) season 2 =

Season of American reality television series

The Circle
- Season 2
- Promotional poster
- Presented by: Michelle Buteau
- No. of days: 14
- No. of contestants: 11
- Winner: DeLeesa St. Agathe
- Runner-up: Chloe Veitch
- Fan Favorite: Chloe Veitch
- No. of episodes: 13

Release
- Original network: Netflix
- Original release: April 14 – May 5, 2021

Season chronology
- ← Previous; Season 1 Next → Season 3

The second season of the American reality competition streaming series The Circle began on April 14, 2021, on Netflix, and concluded on May 5, 2021. The season was announced in March 2020 when Netflix renewed The Circle for a second and third season. Michelle Buteau returned as host.

Like the previous season, players compete against each other to become the most popular, but do not actually meet their competitors. Instead, they communicate through a specially designed app and are able to portray themselves in any way they choose.

On May 5, 2021, the season was won by DeLeesa St. Agathe, who had played the game as her husband, Trevor, and won the US$100,000 prize that came along with it. Chloe Veitch was the runner-up and won the Fan Favorite award and US$10,000.

== Format ==
The contestants, or "Players", move into the same apartment building. However, the contestants do not meet face-to-face during the course of the competition, as they each live in their own individual apartment. They communicate solely using their profiles on a specially designed social media app that gives them the ability to portray themselves in any way they choose. Players can thus opt to present themselves as a completely different personality to the other players, a tactic otherwise known as catfishing.

Throughout the series, the contestants "Rate" one another from first to last place. At the end of the ratings, their average ratings are revealed to one another from lowest to highest. Normally, the two highest-rated players become "Influencers", while the remaining players will be at risk of being "Blocked" by the Influencers. However, occasionally there may be a twist to the blocking process – varying from the lowest rating players being instantly blocked, the identity of the Influencers being a secret, or multiple players being blocked at one time. Blocked players are eliminated from the game, but are given the opportunity to meet one player still in the game in-person. A video message is shown to the remaining players to reveal if they were real or fake the day after.

During the finale, the contestants rate each other one final time, where the highest rated player wins the game and US$100,000. Also, fans of The Circle are able to vote for their favorite player. The player that receives the most votes is known as the Fan Favorite and receives US$10,000.

== Players ==
The first eight players taking part in the season were revealed on April 5, 2021, with additional players being revealed during the run of the show.

Name	Age	Hometown	Playing as		Entered		Exited	Status
Bryant Wood	27	Chico, California	Himself		Episode 1		Episode 2	Blocked
Savannah Palacio	24	Los Angeles, California	Herself		Episode 1		Episode 4	Blocked
Terilisha Godwin-Pierce	34	Dallas, Texas	Herself		Episode 1		Episode 7	Blocked
Khat Bell	27	Mesquite, Texas	Herself		Episode 5		Episode 11	Blocked
Mitchell Eason	22	Conshohocken, Pennsylvania	Himself, but from Miami, Florida		Episode 5		Episode 12	Blocked
Jack Atkins (Note: After being blocked in episode 8, Jack and Lisa joined forces later in the episode to become "John")	20	New Haven, Connecticut	"Emily", a 21-year-old student	"John", a 64-year-old psychic	Episode 1	Episode 8	Episode 13	Fifth place
Lisa Delcampo	42	Los Angeles, California	Lance Bass	"John", a 64-year-old psychic	Episode 3	Episode 8	Episode 13	Fifth place
Lee Swift	58	Mertzon, Texas	"River", a 24-year-old gay student/waiter		Episode 1		Episode 13	Fourth place
Courtney Revolution	28	Los Angeles, California	Himself, but as a barista		Episode 1		Episode 13	Third place
Chloe Veitch	22	Essex, England	Herself		Episode 1		Episode 13	Runner-up
DeLeesa St. Agathe	32	The Bronx, New York	"Trevor", her 32-year-old husband, but single		Episode 1		Episode 13	Winner

=== Other appearances ===
==== Too Hot to Handle ====
Chloe Veitch starred on season 1 of Too Hot to Handle.

==== Perfect Match ====
Savannah Palacio, Chloe Vitch, and Mitchell Eason appeared on the first season of Perfect Match. Palacio was eliminated in Episode Four. Eason was eliminated in Episode Nine.

==== Floor is Lava ====
Jack Atkins, Savannah Palacio, and Courtney Revolution starred on Floor Is Lava.

==== Netflix's Reality Games ====
Courtney Revolution and DeLeesa St. Agathe starred on Netflix’s Reality Games and were two of the four players representing team "The Circle".

==== America's Next Top Model ====
Bryant Wood has appeared on season 22 of America's Next Top Model.

==== The Circle season 4 ====
DeLeesa St. Agathe's husband, Trevor St. Agathe — the real person whose identity she assumed to win season 2 — later joined season 4 of The Circle as a contestant, playing under the persona "Imani." He finished as runner-up.

== Episodes ==
No. overall	No. in season	Title	Day(s)	Original release date	Prod. code	Ref.
Week 1
13	1	"Back and More Savage Than Ever"	Day 1	April 14, 2021	TC-201	TBA
The first eight players are introduced (Bryant, Savannah, Chloe, Courtney, "Trevor"/DeLeesa, "Emily"/Jack, "River"/Lee, Terilisha) and begin to create their profiles. The Circle Chat is immediately opened, prompting suspicion against "Trevor", a single dad actually being played by his 32-year-old wife, DeLeesa.: Game ("Says Who"): Facts about each player are revealed randomly and anonymously, and the others must guess which player each fact belongs to.; Bryant begins a private chat with Courtney and offers to have his back throughout the game. Jack, actually playing a 21-year-old sorority girl named Emily, begins a group chat with the girls. The players rate each other from one to seven, with Savannah and Terilisha being ranked as the Circle influencers. Savannah and "Trevor" find some common ground. Savannah and Terilisha are left with 24 hours to decide who to block from the Circle, but first must immediately decide to save two people from elimination.
14	2	"Alliances Are Formed"	Days 1-2	April 14, 2021	TC-202	TBA
The influencers decide to save "Emily"/Jack and "Trevor"/DeLeesa. The other four contestants begin to worry about potentially being eliminated, so they each start a conversation with an influencer. In the morning, Bryant approaches Terilisha and tries to convince her to not eliminate him. Chloe and "Emily"/Jack talk about why Chloe was not saved by Savannah; Chloe decides to invite Savannah to the chat to get answers from her directly.: Game ("Poetry Slam"): The four at-risk players had to write a piece of poetry in 15 minutes to convince the influencers to keep them in the game.; Bryant approaches Terilisha and tries to convince her to not eliminate him, which works as intended. Courtney forges an alliance with Savannah, and Chloe and "Trevor"/DeLeesa flirt with one another. The influencers then have to decide which contestant to vote off, which causes tension between the two. Terilisha wants to vote out Courtney, feeling he's a threat to her, but Savannah declines. Savannah wants to vote off "River"/Lee, but Terilisha opposes it. In the end, they decide to vote off Bryant. However, before leaving the show, Bryant has the chance to visit one other player face-to-face; he decides to visit "River"/Lee. At the end of the show, the circle announces that someone new will be joining.
15	3	"Bye, Bye, Bye!"	Days 3-4	April 14, 2021	TC-203	TBA
A video posted to the newsfeed reveals that Bryant was not a catfish. New player Lisa joins the game, going undercover as her boss, NSYNC alum Lance Bass. Skepticism flows through The Circle after "Lance"'s profile is revealed to the other players. Savannah inadvertently reveals that Terilisha attempted to block Courtney, resulting in the two forming an alliance. Terilisha creates a group chat with Chloe and "Emily"/Jack, in which she reveals her suspicions about Savannah.: Game ("Truth or Dare"): Players were invited to the Circle Fest and played Truth or Dare.; During the game, Terilisha accuses Savannah of being a game player. Savannah accuses Terilisha of being the least trustworthy.
16	4	"Lines Are Drawn"	Days 4-5	April 14, 2021	TC-204	TBA
"Trevor"/DeLeesa checks in on Savannah after the drama between her and Terilisha where she lets Savannah know she has her back. Terilisha starts a chat with Courtney to let him know that Savannah is causing all of the drama. Courtney thinks Terilisha is causing it. Savannah starts a chat with Chloe and "Emily"/Jack, where she reaches out for their support. The players rate each other. "Lance"/Lisa as a new player can not be rated but can rate other players. Chloe and "Emily"/Jack are rated the highest and choose to block Savannah. Savannah gets to visit one player she thinks should win and visits Courtney. With Courtney chosen as the most deserving to win, he gains access to The Inner Circle.
Week 2
17	5	"Snake in the Grass"	Days 5-6	April 21, 2021	TC-205	TBA
Savannah's video is posted to the newsfeed which reveals she is not a catfish. She states that there are multiple snakes still in The Circle. Courtney is in The Inner Circle where he has the power to influence the game. He unlocks a secret identity, "The Joker". "The Joker" talks to the new players (Mitchell and Khat) before they are introduced to The Circle. Courtney immediately tells them not to trust Chloe and Terilisha.: Game ("Two Faced"): Players share a naughty and nice photo of themselves with a hashtag for each.; Courtney returns to The Inner Circle and gets to choose one player to be an influencer at the next blocking.
18	6	"A Love Triangle"	Days 6-7	April 21, 2021	TC-206	TBA
Chloe has a chat with both Mitchell and "Trevor"/DeLeesa where she flirts with both of them.: Game ("Batter Up"): The players have to create an animal they think best represents them from pancakes. The players vote Khat and "Trevor"/DeLeesa as the winners.; "River"/Lee is revealed to be the influencer that Courtney chose. The players are informed one of them was playing as "The Joker" but were not told who it was. Terilisha talks to Khat to figure out what "The Joker" said. After the information Khat gives her, she assumes that "The Joker" was "Emily"/Jack. The ratings reveal Courtney as the other influencer.
19	7	"Friend Zoned...."	Days 7-8	April 21, 2021	TC-207	TBA
Terilisha is blocked and visits Chloe. The players get Terilisha's video in the newsfeed the next morning where she reveals she knows who "The Joker" is and what they said to Khat and Mitchell. Khat, "Lance"/Lisa, and Mitchell talk and Khat thinks "Lance"/Lisa is a catfish.: Game ("Glammequins"): Jonathan Van Ness leaves a message for that the players have to create their most fabulous self on a mannequin head and upload a picture to the chat. Suspicions arise when the players see "Lance"/Lisa and "Emily"/Jack photos. "Lance"/Lisa because the wig does not look like something Lance Bass would do for hair, and "Emily"/Jack because it looks worse than what they imagine a 21-year-old girl could do with makeup. Jonathan picks "Trevor"/DeLeesa as the winner of the game.; Mitchell friend zones Chloe after "Trevor"/DeLeesa tells him they're very close. "Emily"/Jack is upset with how the game went and believes it cost him the game and that everyone thinks he's catfishing. The players receive an alert that the next ratings will have two players will be blocked the next day.
20	8	"Damage Control"	Days 8-9	April 21, 2021	TC-208	TBA
"Emily"/Jack and "Lance"/Lisa start to form a friendship. Khat and "Trevor"/DeLeesa talk about their suspicions with "Emily"/Jack and "Lance"/Lisa. Chloe, Courtney, and "River"/Lee talk about their suspicions with "Emily"/Jack.: Game ("Don't @ Me"): A player gets to ask another player a question anonymously. Mitchell asks "Emily"/Jack to name five makeup brands. When he can only name three, suspicions continue to rise as he names fake brands. "River"/Lee calls out "Trevor"/DeLeesa for being a catfish.; "Trevor"/DeLeesa reaches out to "River"/Lee as she suspects he sent the catfish message about her. The rating results come in but with the twist that there will be no influencers. "Emily"/Jack and "Lance"/Lisa are the lowest rated and are instantly blocked from The Circle. "Lance"/Lisa chooses to meet "River"/Lee and "Emily"/Jack chooses "Trevor"/DeLeesa. They meet each other instead and get an alert where they have been given a second chance. They have a shared profile and will be playing as someone The Circle set up for them.
Week 3
21	9	"A New Twist"	Days 9-10	April 28, 2021	TC-209	TBA
Jack and Lisa are now playing as "John", a 64-year-old psychic. "Emily"/Jack and "Lance"/Lisa have their videos posted in the newsfeed and the players see they were both catfishing. The circle chat opens and the players are unaware that "John"/Jack and Lisa are lurking. No one says if "Emily"/Jack or "Lance"/Lisa visited them after being blocked, leading the players to think people are lying. "John"/Jack and Lisa's profile is revealed to The Circle. Khat tells Courtney and "River"/Lee that she thinks Chloe is a liar and is unaware they are both close with Chloe.: Game ("Geek Chic Quiz"): The players get split into two teams with Chloe and "John"/Jack and Lisa as team captains and get to choose their players and who should answer the questions. "John"/Jack and Lisa chose "Trevor"/DeLeesa, "River"/Lee, and Courtney, and Chloe chose Khat and Mitchell. "John"/Jack and Lisa's team won 3-2. The winning team got a "Cool Kids Party".; Chloe starts a chat with "Trevor"/DeLeesa and admits her feelings towards him. "Trevor"/DeLeesa starts to feel bad knowing she is catfishing but continues to flirt. Courtney and "River"/Lee inform Chloe about what Khat told them earlier. Chloe tells them how she thinks Khat is a game player.
22	10	"Campaigning to Win"	Days 10-11	April 28, 2021	TC-210	TBA
Game ("Democracy Day"): The players get to vote for the player they would give a gift to. The player who receives the most votes receives a package. Courtney and "River"/Lee tie with two votes each. "John"/Jack and Lisa get the deciding vote and choose Courtney to win. Later, each player has to design a campaign poster for another player. They have to create a picture of the player and include a slogan that best fits their campaign to win The Circle. Each poster will be uploaded anonymously.; Courtney informs "Trevor"/DeLeesa about how Khat feels about Chloe. The players rate each other. The ratings reveal Chloe and "Trevor"/DeLeesa as the influencers.
23	11	"The Master Plan"	Days 11-12	April 28, 2021	TC-211	TBA
Khat is blocked from The Circle and visits "Trevor"/DeLeesa. Her video is posted and the players see she was not a catfish. She also informs everyone to not believe everything. Courtney and "River"/Lee think they need to keep an eye on Mitchell as he hasn't talked to either of them. Mitchell and "Trevor"/DeLeesa form a plan to break up Courtney and "River"/Lee's alliance.: Game ("The Circle Awards"): The players vote for a player in the different categories given. After the awards are over, the players get an after-party.; "Trevor"/DeLeesa starts her plan by talking to "River"/Lee. Mitchell talks to Chloe to get her in his alliance. The players get an alert that the final blocking will take place the next day.
24	12	"The Last Blocking"	Days 12-13	April 28, 2021	TC-212	TBA
Mitchell reaches out to Courtney and "River"/Lee and they both let him know they don't want to be friends. Mitchell and "Trevor"/DeLeesa message Chloe that Courtney was "The Joker". Chloe is also informed that Courtney and "River"/Lee only care about each other when it comes to winning. The players have to share with the others what they would spend the money on if they won. The players submit their ratings. Each player gets a video from home. The rating results were not revealed, but, "River"/Lee was rated the highest and became the super influencer. He must block someone face to face and blocks Mitchell. The remaining players are announced as finalists and will get to meet each other the next day.
Week 4
25	13	"And The Winner Is..."	Days 13-14	May 5, 2021	TC-213	TBA
Mitchell's video is posted in the newsfeed. The players submit their final ratings. The players get the chance to meet each other face to face. Chloe meets "Trevor"/DeLeesa and sees she was catfishing. "River"/Lee is revealed to Chloe, Courtney, and "Trevor"/DeLeesa as a catfish. "John"/Jack and Lisa is revealed as a catfish to the other finalists. Michelle Buteau catches up with the blocked players. The Savannah and Terilisha drama picks up again. "John"/Jack and Lisa comes in fifth place, "River"/Lee in fourth, and Courtney in third. "Trevor"/DeLeesa is announced as the winner, with Chloe as the runner up.

== Results and elimination ==
Color key
The contestant was blocked.
The contestant was an influencer.
The contestant was immune from being blocked.
The player was at risk of being blocked following a twist
This player was blocked, but returned under a different profile

		Episode 1	Episode 4	Episode 6	Episode 8	Episode 10	Episode 12	Episode 13	
DeLeesa "Trevor"		3rd	3rd	3rd	4th	2nd	Not published	Winner (Episode 13)	
Chloe		6th	1st	2nd	1st	1st	Not published	Runner-up (Episode 13)	
Courtney		=4th	5th	1st	6th	4th	Not published	Third Place (Episode 13)	
Lee "River"		=4th	4th	Exempt	3rd	3rd	Not published	Fourth Place (Episode 13)	
Lisa "Lance"	"John"	Not in The Circle	Exempt	5th	7th	Exempt	Not published	Fifth Place (Episode 13)	
Jack "Emily"	"John"	7th	2nd	4th	8th	Exempt	Not published	Fifth Place (Episode 13)	
Mitchell		Not in The Circle		Exempt	5th	5th	Not published	Blocked (Episode 12)	
Khat		Not in The Circle		Exempt	2nd	6th	Blocked (Episode 11)		
Terilisha		1st	7th	6th	Blocked (Episode 7)				
Savannah		2nd	6th	Blocked (Episode 4)					
Bryant		8th	Blocked (Episode 2)						
Notes		1	2	3	4	none	5	6	
Influencers		Savannah, Terilisha	Chloe, Jack	Courtney, Lee	none	Chloe, DeLeesa	Lee	none	
Blocked		Bryant; Influencers' choice to block	Savannah; Influencers' choice to block	Terilisha; Influencers' choice to block	Jack "Emily"; Lowest rated player	Khat; Influencers' choice to block	Mitchell; Superinfluencer's choice to block	Jack & Lisa "John"; Fifth highest rated player	Lee "River"; Fourth highest rated player
Blocked		Bryant; Influencers' choice to block	Savannah; Influencers' choice to block	Terilisha; Influencers' choice to block	Lisa "Lance"; Second lowest rated player	Khat; Influencers' choice to block	Mitchell; Superinfluencer's choice to block	Courtney; Third highest rated player	Chloe; Second highest rated player
Blocked		Bryant; Influencers' choice to block	Savannah; Influencers' choice to block	Terilisha; Influencers' choice to block	Lisa "Lance"; Second lowest rated player	Khat; Influencers' choice to block	Mitchell; Superinfluencer's choice to block	DeLeesa "Trevor"; Highest rated player	

=== Notes ===
- ^Note 1: In Episode 1, before deciding who to block, Terilisha and Savannah had a chance to save a player each. Terilisha chose to save Jack "Emily", while Savannah chose to save Deleesa "Trevor".
- ^Note 2: At the end of Episode 4, Savannah visited Courtney, viewing him as having the most potential to win. This indirectly gave Courtney secret access to the Inner Circle following Savannah's departure.
- ^Note 3: As a part of the Joker Twist, Courtney was able to automatically pick an Influencer in the Inner Circle. Courtney chose to make River an Influencer.
- ^Note 4: In this round, there were no influencers. Instead, the two lowest rated players would be blocked. Jack "Emily", placing 8th, and Lisa "Lance", placing 7th were respectively blocked from The Circle. Following the blocking, Jack and Lisa continued in the game together as new player John.
- ^Note 5: In Episode 12, the ratings were not published. Instead, the highest-rated player automatically became the "Superinfluencer," who could make the sole decision on whom to block.
- ^Note 6: In Episode 13, the players made their final ratings.
