= The Circle (American TV series) season 4 =

The Circle
- Season 4
- Presented by: Michelle Buteau
- No. of days: 13
- No. of contestants: 13
- Winner: Frank Grimsley
- Runner-up: Trevor St. Agathe
- Fan Favorite: Josh "Bru" Brubaker
- No. of episodes: 13

Release
- Original network: Netflix
- Original release: May 4 – May 25, 2022

Season chronology
- ← Previous; Season 3 Next → Season 5

The fourth season of the American reality competition streaming series The Circle premiered on Netflix on May 4, 2022. Michelle Buteau returned as host; the season consists of 13 episodes, initially released four episodes weekly. Players compete without ever actually meeting in person; they communicate through a simulated social media interface, portraying themselves in any way they choose.

Frank Grimsley, who had played the game as himself, won the US$150,000 prize on May 25, 2022. His win cemented him as the first LGBT winner. Trevor St. Agathe as "Imani" was the runner-up. Josh "Bru" Brubaker won the Fan Favorite award and US$10,000.

== Format ==
The contestants, or "players", move into the same apartment building. However, the contestants do not meet face-to-face during the course of the competition, as they each live in their own individual apartment. They communicate solely using their profiles on a specially designed social media app that gives them the ability to portray themselves in any way they choose. Players can thus opt to present themselves as a completely different personality to the other players, a tactic otherwise known as catfishing.

Throughout the series, the contestants "rate" one another from first to last place. At the end of the ratings, their average ratings are revealed to one another from lowest to highest. Normally, the two highest-rated players become "Influencers", while the remaining players will be at risk of being "blocked" by the Influencers. However, occasionally there may be a twist to the blocking process – varying from the lowest rating players being instantly blocked, the identity of the Influencers being a secret, or multiple players being blocked at one time. Blocked players are eliminated from the game, but are given the opportunity to meet one player still in the game in-person. Then, the day after a blocking, a video message is shown to the remaining players to reveal if they were real or fake.

During the finale, the contestants rate each other one final time, where the highest rated player wins the game and US$150,000. Also, fans of The Circle are able to vote for their favorite player. The player that receives the most votes is known as the Fan Favorite and receives US$10,000.

== Production ==
=== Development and release ===
The season was announced on August 9, 2021, when Netflix renewed The Circle for a fourth and fifth season prior the premiere of the third season. The season premiered on May 4, with four episodes released weekly until May 25.

A teaser for the season was released on April 27, 2022, showing bits of the cast and revealing that the prize money had been increased to $150,000 rather than the $100,000 prize awarded during previous seasons due to Spice Girls members Emma Bunton and Mel B increasing the prize fund by completing a mission while partaking in the season. During the trailer, it was also confirmed that previous host Michelle Buteau will continue to host the series.

=== Casting and filming ===
Filming for the season took place in Fall 2021 at an apartment complex in Manchester, England. The same complex that was used during previous seasons and other versions of the series. The apartment complex is prepared with twelve furnished and ready-to-use apartments for the players to live in.

After the third season began airing, casting for the fourth and fifth seasons opened on April 12, 2021. The initial members of the cast were revealed on April 27, 2022.

== Players ==
The season consisted of 13 players. Various members of the first set of nine players were teased alongside a trailer release on April 27, 2022. An official cast reveal took place the following day. These players included two catfishes and five players participating as themselves. Additionally, extra players were revealed as the season progressed. The first celebrity contestants, Emma Bunton & Mel B from Spice Girls, competed to help increase the prize money, however they did not partake in ratings and were not competing to win. Other additional cast members included one catfish and two players playing as themselves, two of these players were revealed with the rest of the cast but joined The Circle later. Additionally, Trevor St. Agathe, who was the catfish profile of season two winner and his wife, DeLeesa St. Agathe, participated in this season.

'The Circle' Season 4 Contestants (Ages stated are at start of contest)
Name	Age	Playing as	Entered	Exited	Status	Ref.
Frank Grimsley	28	Himself	Episode 1	Episode 13	Winner	
Trevor St. Agathe	35	"Imani", his wife's friend	Episode 7	Episode 13	Runner-up	
Yu Ling Wu	25	Herself	Episode 1	Episode 13	Third place	
Rachel Evans	29	Herself	Episode 3	Episode 13	Fourth place	
Eversen Bevelle	35	Himself	Episode 7	Episode 13	Fifth place	
Alex Brizard	28	"Nathan", a 22-year old college student	Episode 3	Episode 13	Blocked	
Josh "Bru" Brubaker	25	Himself	Episode 1	Episode 12	Blocked	
John Franklin	24	"Carol", his 63-year old mother	Episode 1	Episode 11	Blocked	
Alyssa Ljubicich	27	Herself	Episode 1	Episode 9	Blocked	
Crissa Jackson	31	Herself	Episode 1	Episode 7	Blocked	
Emma Bunton	46	"Jared", a 28-year-old children's author	Episode 2	Episode 5	Left	
Mel B	47	"Jared", a 28-year-old children's author	Episode 2	Episode 5	Left	
Parker Abbott	21	"Paul", her 56-year old father	Episode 1	Episode 2	Blocked	

== Episodes ==
No. overall	No. in season	Title	Day(s)	Original release date	Prod. code	Ref.
Week 1
39	1	"A Spicy Start"	Day 1	May 4, 2022	TC-401	
The first seven players entered The Circle and created their profiles. The first four players to enter, Alyssa, Frank, John (who is catfishing as his mom Carol), and Yu Ling started the first circle chat and viewed each other's profiles. The last three to enter, Crissa, Bru, and Parker (who is catfishing as her dad Paul) enter and join the circle chat. "Paul"/Parker decided to tell the other players that her father's career is being a marriage therapist, which is a lie. During the chat, the players began to feel suspicious that "Paul"/Parker is a catfish after she revealed that she did not know what a memoir is. The players later play a game titled, "Been There Done That", where they are given a statement and vote yes or no whether they've been there or done that. Later in the day, the players were tasked with rating each other from first to sixth, much to their shock of it happening so early in the game. "Paul"/Parker tries to convince Frank and Bru that she is not a catfish. The ratings were revealed to the players with Frank and "Carol"/John placing in the top two spots and being crowned the first influencers of the season. For being the top-rated influencer, Frank was given the chance to choose a new player to join the game. His options were "Jared" and "Trey", both of whom were revealed to be catfish profiles portrayed by Spice Girls members Emma Bunton and Mel B.
40	2	"Cake Me As I Am"	Days 1-2	May 4, 2022	TC-402	
Emma and Mel officially entered the game and set up their profile as "Jared" a children's author, who was chosen for them by Frank. The next day, Emma and Mel/Jared learned that they must stay undetected, and will only be competing to increase the prize money for the other players. The next day, the duo entered the game and they met the other players. Later, the players played a game where they must decorate a cake to impress the other players. The players spent the day chatting, Emma and Mel/Jared started a chat with Frank and Crissa to learn more about them. At night, Frank and John/Carol were sent to the hangout to decide who to block. The ultimately decided to block Parker/Paul.
41	3	"90's Party Surprise"	Days 2-3	May 4, 2022	TC-403	
Before she left, Parker/Paul was given an opportunity to meet another player face-to-face, she ultimately chose to visit John/Carol learning that he is a catfish. The next morning, Parker/Paul left a video message to the rest of the players, revealing that she is a catfish. Alyssa started a chat with Jared. New players, Rachel who enters the game as herself, and Alex who enters the game as "frat bro" Nathan, enter the game and set up their profiles. Rachel was allowed to start a group chat with two other players, she chooses to message Emma and Mel/Jared and Yu Ling. Alex/Nathan was allowed to start a chat as well, he chose to message Bru and Frank. That night, The Circle threw the players a "90's Party". Emma and Mel/Jared received a special alert, telling them that the other players will learn that Emma and Mel are behind one of the profiles in the game, but they will not learn which profile. Both Emma and Mel were tasked with visiting the "Inner Circle" to reveal their presence in the game to the players.
42	4	"Nobody Is Safe"	Days 3-4	May 4, 2022	TC-404	
The players react to the twist. The Circle chat opens up and the players discuss the events. The players partake in a Spice Girls quiz. The players spend the day discussing amongst each other on which profile the Spice Girls could be controlling. Voting began for the players to decide who they thought was the Spice Girls.
Week 2
43	5	"Goodbye My Friends"	Days 4-5	May 11, 2022	TC-405	
The final votes from the players came down to Rachel and Yu Ling, who voted for Alyssa and Rachel respectively. Since Emma and Mel/Jared did not receive the majority of the votes, they increased the prize fund by $50,000. They revealed themselves as Jared by voting for themselves. The duo was tasked with visiting another player, they visited Alyssa before leaving The Circle for good. The next day, the players received a video message from Emma and Mel/Jared. Later in the day, the players played a game. Alex/Nathan messages Crissa, attempting to create a bond due to feeling alone in the game. The players were later tasked with rating each other from first to sixth. As new players, Alex/Nathan and Rachel were not able to be rated, but could rate.
44	6	"All Is Fair in Circle War"	Days 5-6	May 11, 2022	TC-406	
Rachel started a group chat with everyone in the game attempting to raise everyones spirits. The players played a game where they must roast each other, the game was hosted by Nikki Glaser. The rating results were revealed to the players, Crissa placed in last place, Bru and John/Carol tied for fourth place, and Frank placed third, Alyssa and Yu Ling were crowned influencers by placing in the top two spots. After Nikki read the players' roasts, Alyssa and Yu Ling were sent to the hangout to make their decision on who to block.
45	7	"The Party Divide"	Days 6-7	May 11, 2022	TC-407	
Due to being the top influencer, Yu Ling was sent to block the player she and Alyssa chose in-person. She ended up visiting Crissa, telling her that neither she or Alyssa had any connections or trust in her. The next morning, Crissa left a video message for the rest of the players. Frank messages Yu Ling to know the reason why she blocked Crissa, as she was vague about her and Alyssa's reasoning. They eventually add Rachel to their chat after learning that John/Carol is a snake. Two new players, Eversen, a cruise director, and Trevor (who is catfishing as Imani, a friend of his wife) join the Circle. Trevor reveals that he is playing as a catfish because he was his wife's catfish during the second season. Rachel and Nathan chatted with each other and formed a "newbie alliance". Later, both Eversen and Trevor/Imani invited the other players to parties they were tasked to throw by the Circle. Bru and Rachel attended Eversen's party. While John/Carol, Alyssa, Alex/Nathan, Yu Ling and Frank attended Trevor/Imani's party. The players learned that there will be no new additions to the Circle.
46	8	"Circle Cyber Attack"	Days 7-8	May 11, 2022	TC-408	
Eversen and Trevor/Imani officially enter the Circle. Both new players message the players that did not attend their party. The Circle is interrupted by a "Circle Data Breach". Both Everton and Trevor/Imani are protected from the data breach. The players all anonymously receive photos of another player, they are allowed to ask a question to the player they received anonymously. The players learned that the new players must pass on the antivirus to another player to save them from being blocked, any player left with the virus would be blocked from the Circle. Later that night, Eversen and Trevor/Imani chose to pass the antivirus to Frank. Frank chose to pass it to Yu Ling. Yu Ling chose to pass it to Rachel, and Rachel chose to pass it to Alex/Nathan. In the end, Alex/Nathan chose to pass the antivirus to Bru, leaving Bru in charge of who does not get the antivirus and who gets blocked.
Week 3
47	9	"Trust Is Tested"	Days 8-9	May 18, 2022	TC-409	
Bru made his decision, he passed the anti virus on John/Carol, blocking Alyssa from the Circle. Before she left, she was allowed to meet another player face-to-face, she chose to visit Bru. The next day, Alyssa leaves a message for the other players, whilst throwing Yu Ling under the bus for not choosing to save her during the virus attack. The players later played a game and spent the rest of the day chatting amongst each other.
48	10	"A Plea for Survival"	Day 10	May 18, 2022	TC-410	
The player start their day by participating in a game hosted by Eversen. The players were tasked with rating each other, with Rachel, Alex/Nathan, Eversen and Trevor/Imani being eligible to be rated for the first time. The ratings were revealed with John/Carol placing eighth, Alex/Nathan placing seventh, Bru placing sixth, Eversen placing fifth, Trevor/Imani placing fourth, Rachel placing third, and Yu Ling and Frank placing in second and first respectively. Before the influencers made their decision, Frank and Yu Ling were tasked to save two players, Frank chose to save Rachel and Trevor/Imani, while Yu Ling chose to save Bru and Alex/Nathan. At risk, John/Carol and Eversen pled to the influencers on why they should not block them. Before the blocking, both at risk players met in the same room to see who the influencers block.
49	11	"Throw to the Wolves"	Days 10-11	May 18, 2022	TC-411	
The influencers blocked John/Carol from the Circle. The next morning, he leaves a message for the rest of the players, revealing that he is a catfish. The players participated in a game where they must paint other players. Alex/Nathan and Eversen use the game to their advantage, by painting Frank and Yu Ling as snakes.
50	12	"Just When You Thought You Were Safe"	Day 12	May 18, 2022	TC-412	
In the morning, Frank invites Rachel and Yu Ling to a private group chat to discuss the painting challenge from the night before. Before the ratings, the players received video messages from friends and family while enjoying a feast with the other players to celebrate almost making the finale. The players made their next ratings with the player coming in last automatically being blocked from the Circle, that player was Bru. Bru was allowed to meet another player face-to-face, he visited Alex/Nathan. After the visit, the players learned that the top rated player would block someone, resulting in a double blocking. Frank was revealed as the secret influencer and was tasked with blocking a player anonymously.
Week 4
51	13	"A Winner Is Crowned"	Days 12-13	May 25, 2022	TC-413	
The blocked player was revealed to be Alex/Nathan. Yu Ling was visited by him before he officially left the Circle. The next morning, the players celebrate making it to the final day in the Circle with video messages from Bru and Alex/Nathan. The players were then tasked to make their final ratings, with these rankings deciding who wins the game. The players met up and met each other face-to-face for the first time in the season. Trevor/Imani entered the room, revealing he was a catfish. Later at the finale reunion, which included blocked players, Michelle Buteau talked with the players before revealing the final ratings. Frank placed first and became the winner of The Circle. Trevor/Imani got second place, Yu Ling got third place, Rachel got fourth place, and Eversen got fifth place.

== Results and elimination ==
Color key
The contestant was blocked.
The contestant was an influencer.
The contestant was immune from being blocked.

	Episode 1	Episode 4	Episode 6	Episode 8	Episode 10	Episode 12	Episode 13 (Final)	
Influencer(s)	Frank, John	none	Alyssa, Yu Ling	none	Frank, Yu Ling	Frank	none	
Frank	1st	Voted for Jared	3rd	Chose to save Yu Ling	1st	Not published	Winner (Episode 13)	
Trevor "Imani"	Not in The Circle			Chose to save Frank	4th	Not published	Runner-up (Episode 13)	
Yu Ling	6th	Voted for Rachel	1st	Chose to save Rachel	2nd	Not published	Third Place (Episode 13)	
Rachel	Not in The Circle	Voted for Alyssa	Exempt	Chose to save Nathan	3rd	Not published	Fourth place (Episode 13)	
Eversen	Not in The Circle			Chose to save Frank	5th	Not published	Fifth Place (Episode 13)	
Alex "Nathan"	Not in The Circle	Voted for Rachel	Exempt	Chose to save Bru	7th	Not published	Blocked (Episode 13)	
Bru	5th	Voted for Rachel	=4th	Chose to save Carol	6th	Not published	Blocked (Episode 12)	
John "Carol"	2nd	Voted for Nathan	=4th	Saved	8th	Blocked (Episode 11)		
Alyssa	4th	Voted for Jared	2nd	Not saved	Blocked (Episode 9)			
Crissa	3rd	Voted for Carol	6th	Blocked (Episode 7)				
Emma & Mel "Jared"	Exempt	Voted for Jared	Left (Episode 5)					
Parker "Paul"	7th	Blocked (Episode 2)						
Notes	1	2,3	none	4	5	6	7	
Left	none	Emma & Mel "Jared"	none					
Blocked	Parker "Paul"; Influencers' choice to block	None	Crissa; Influencers' choice to block	Alyssa; Left without Antivirus Software	John "Carol"; Influencers' choice to block	Bru; Lowest- rated player	Eversen; Lowest rated player	Rachel; Fourth highest rated player
Blocked	Parker "Paul"; Influencers' choice to block	None	Crissa; Influencers' choice to block	Alyssa; Left without Antivirus Software	John "Carol"; Influencers' choice to block	Alex "Nathan"; Superinfluencer's choice to block	Yu Ling; Third highest rated player	Trevor "Imani"; Second highest rated player
Blocked	Parker "Paul"; Influencers' choice to block	None	Crissa; Influencers' choice to block	Alyssa; Left without Antivirus Software	John "Carol"; Influencers' choice to block	Alex "Nathan"; Superinfluencer's choice to block	Frank; Highest- rated player	
Ref.								

=== Notes ===
- ^Note 1: After the ratings were revealed, Frank was told that he would have to choose a new player to join the Circle the next day, being shown two profiles, "Jared" and "Trey". The new player was revealed to be played by Emma & Melanie at the end of the first episode. Due to being a new player, Jared could not be blocked during the first blocking.
- ^Note 2: Emma and Melanie were revealed to be taking part for a limited time, with the mission to stay undetected during that period in order to increase the winner's prize.
- ^Note 3: The players were tasked with voting for who they think which profile Emma and Melanie are behind. Since a majority of the players did not vote for Jared, the winner's prize was increased.
- ^Note 4: Due to the Cyber Attack, all players except Eversen & Trevor/Imani were vulnerable to be blocked. They had to choose who to save, and they chose Frank. This process then continued with the player who received the Antivirus most recently choosing the next person until one person was left without it, and therefore blocked. Bru, who had the final choice, chose to give the Antivirus to John/Carol, leaving Alyssa blocked.
- ^Note 5: Before deciding who to block, Frank and Yu Ling had a chance to save two players each. Frank chose Rachel and Imani, while Yu Ling chose Bru and Alex/Nathan. The two remaining players at risk of being blocked, Everson and John/Carol, went to the Meet Room to await the influencers' decision.
- ^Note 6: The ratings were not published. The lowest-rated player was immediately blocked. Meanwhile, the highest-rated player automatically became the "Superinfluencer," who could make the sole decision on whom to block.
- ^Note 7: The players made their final ratings.

== Reception ==
Since the season premiered, it kept in Netflix's "Top 10 TV Series in the U.S." list, and kept in the top for its entire run. The series landed at number six on the list for its second week on air, for its third, the series landed at number three, and for its last the series ranked at number ten. However, the season received criticism for its casting of big personalities. Many fans were upset at the fact that most of the players were social media personalities and not "real people".
