= The Circle (American TV series) season 1 =

Season of American reality television series

The Circle
- Season 1
- Promotional poster for season one
- Presented by: Michelle Buteau
- No. of days: 12
- No. of contestants: 14
- Winner: Joey Sasso
- Runner-up: Shubham Goel
- Fan Favorite: Sammie Cimarelli
- No. of episodes: 12

Release
- Original network: Netflix
- Original release: January 1 – January 15, 2020

Season chronology
- Next → Season 2

The first season of the American reality competition streaming series The Circle began on January 1, 2020, on Netflix, and concluded on January 15, 2020. This season was hosted by Michelle Buteau.

Ahead of the season, it was announced that players would be competing against each other to become the most popular, but would never actually meet. Instead they would communicate through a specially designed app and be able to portray themselves in any way they choose. Netflix renewed The Circle for a second and third season on March 24, 2020.

On January 15, 2020, the season was won by Joey Sasso, who had played the game as himself, and won the US$100,000 prize that came along with it. Shubham Goel was the runner-up. Sammie Cimarelli won the Fan Favorite award and US$10,000.

== Format ==
The contestants, or "players", move into the same apartment building. However, the contestants do not meet face-to-face during the course of the competition, as they each live in their own individual apartment. They communicate solely using their profiles on a specially designed social media app that gives them the ability to portray themselves in any way they choose. Players can thus opt to present themselves as a completely different personality to the other players, a tactic otherwise known as catfishing.

Throughout the series, the contestants "rate" one another from first to last place. At the end of the ratings, their average ratings are revealed to one another from lowest to highest. Normally, the two highest-rated players become "Influencers", while the remaining players will be at risk of being "blocked" by the Influencers. However, occasionally there may be a twist to the blocking process – varying from the lowest rating players being instantly blocked, the identity of the Influencers being a secret, or multiple players being blocked at one time. Blocked players are eliminated from the game, but are given the opportunity to meet one player still in the game in-person. Then, the day after a blocking, a video message is shown to the remaining players to reveal if they were real or fake.

During the finale, the contestants rate each other one final time, where the highest rated player wins the game and US$100,000. Also, fans of The Circle are able to vote for their favorite player. The player that receives the most votes is known as the Fan Favorite and receives US$10,000.

== Players ==
The final five players of the first season of The Circle. From left to right, the players in the photo are Chris Sapphire, Seaburn Williams (who played as "Rebecca"), Sammie Cimarelli, Joey Sasso, and Shubham Goel. Sasso ended up winning The Circle, and Cimarelli won the Fan Favorite award.

The first eight players were announced on The Circle's Instagram on December 16, 2019. A total of 13 players were selected from the "20–25 individuals" being cleared to appear on the show, with the remaining people never leaving standby status and not appearing on the show. The five players not announced prior to the show's premiere were revealed as they introduced themselves on-screen during an episode.

(Ages stated are at start of contest)

Name	Age	Hometown	Playing as	Entered	Exited	Status
Alana Duval	25	Brownsville, Texas	Herself	Episode 1	Episode 1	Blocked
Antonio DePína	24	Bear, Delaware	Himself, but single	Episode 1	Episode 4	Blocked
Karyn Blanco	37	The Bronx, New York	"Mercedeze", a bisexual 27-year-old	Episode 1	Episode 6	Blocked
Miranda Bissonnette	26	South Lake Tahoe, California	Herself	Episode 2	Episode 8	Blocked
Bill Cranley	27	Chicago, Illinois	Himself	Episode 6	Episode 9	Blocked
Alex Lake	32	Los Angeles, California	"Adam", a sexy 27-year-old	Episode 4	Episode 9	Blocked
Sean Taylor	25	New York City, New York	Herself, but using a slimmer woman's photos and single (Episodes 6–9); Herself (Episodes 9–10)	Episode 6	Episode 10	Blocked
Ed Eason	23	Conshohocken, Pennsylvania	Ed, but older (26) and not revealing his mother Tammy's presence in the game	Episode 8	Episode 11	Blocked
Tammy Eason	52	Conshohocken, Pennsylvania	Ed, but older (26) and not revealing his mother Tammy's presence in the game	Episode 8	Episode 11	Blocked
Seaburn Williams	29	Boston, Massachusetts	"Rebecca", his 26-year-old girlfriend	Episode 1	Episode 12	Fifth place
Chris Sapphire	30	Dallas, Texas	Himself	Episode 1	Episode 12	Fourth place
Sammie Cimarelli	24	Miami, Florida	Herself, but single	Episode 1	Episode 12	Third place
Shubham Goel	23	Danville, California	Himself	Episode 1	Episode 12	Runner-up
Joey Sasso	25	Rochester, New York	Himself	Episode 1	Episode 12	Winner

=== Future appearances ===
==== The Circle Season Five ====
Shubham Goel returned to compete in the fifth season of The Circle. He was blocked in Episode Eight.

==== Perfect Match ====
Joey Sasso competed on the first season of Perfect Match. He ended the season as a finalist engaged to Kariselle Snow.

==== Netflix Reality Games ====
Joey Sasso and Sammie Cimarelli starred on Netflix’s Reality Games and were 2 of the 4 players representing team "The Circle".

==== Battle Camp ====
Shubham Geol competed on the first season of Battle Camp. He finished as one of the six finalists.

==== The Challenge ====
Ed Eason starred on seasons 37 and 39 of The Challenge.

==== The Goat ====
Joey Sasso competed on Amazon Freevee’s reality show, The Goat.

== Episodes ==
On December 29, 2019, The New York Times published an article describing the background and inside of the show. It was revealed that twelve episodes would be airing from January 1 to January 15 with four episodes being released every Wednesday as part of the "three week event."

No. overall	No. in season	Title	Day(s)	Original release date	Prod. code	Ref.
Week 1
1	1	"Hello, Circle"	Day 1	January 1, 2020 (Note: On December 30, 2019, Netflix released a shortened exclusive cut of the first episode on their YouTube channel as a preview to the series.)	TC-101	
The first eight players entered the apartment building and created their profiles. Then, an alert told the players that they can now look at the other players' profiles. Immediately, the players had to rate the others from first to seventh based on first impressions. The Circle Chat then opened, allowing players to contact each other for the first time.: Game ("Ice Breaker"): Players had to answer multiple choice questions regarding serious and non-serious questions. Then, after everyone answered the question, their choices were revealed to everyone. The players then had a time to discuss the question and what their answers were.; The next day, after several players had started getting to know each other, the ratings were revealed. Sammie and Antonio placed first and second respectively, making them the first Influencers. Sammie and Antonio had to immediately head to the Hangout to determine which of the other players should be blocked from The Circle. They decided to block Alana. Alana made her way to meet one of the players face-to-face.
2	2	"Face-to-Face"	Days 1-2	January 1, 2020	TC-102	
Alana visited Sammie's apartment because she thought they were close, but Sammie eventually ended up blocking her. Sammie told her that she was sounding fake and not like a professional model should. The next day, The Circle presented a video message from Alana, revealing that she was genuine and not a catfish. After finding out that Alana was real, Antonio confessed to Joey that he felt guilty for sending Alana home over "Mercedeze"/Karyn.: Game ("Who Dis?"): One at a time, a player was shown a picture of a celebrity. That player then had to describe the celebrity to the other players. If the other players were able to guess which celebrity was being described, they earned a prize. Since everyone got the celebrities correct, they were given a party that night and were able to add another photo to their profiles.; During the party, a new player, Miranda, joined The Circle and created her profile. After she made her profile, she was able to watch the ongoing conversation on The Circle Chat. Then she had to choose one player to send a gift to and have a private chat with.
3	3	"There's a Catfish Among Us"	Days 2-3	January 1, 2020	TC-103	
Miranda chose "Mercedeze"/Karyn as she wanted to know her more and thought that they would connect. All other players were "buffered" until the morning, meaning they could not access The Circle at all. The next day, ratings opened, with the caveat that Miranda could not rate or be rated since she was the new player.: Game ("Ask Me Anything"): One at a time, each player could anonymously pose a question to another player in The Circle Chat. That question has to be answered publicly. After it was answered, all players were able to respond, allowing them to voice their thoughts on the question and the answer.; The ratings were revealed, and Chris and Shubham, who were tied for first place, became Influencers.
4	4	"Planting Doubt"	Days 3-4	January 1, 2020	TC-104	
Chris and Shubham had to immediately make their way to the Hangout, where they had to decide which of the remaining players to block. They decided to block Antonio, since neither had gotten to know him well. Antonio decided to visit "Mercedeze"/Karyn's apartment, where he discovered that Karyn was playing as a catfish. The next day, The Circle posted a goodbye message from Antonio.: Game ("Nailed It / Failed It"): Players were shown a photo of a cake and had thirty minutes to recreate it from scratch. Then everyone voted on which cake looked the best. The player who created the cake that earned the most likes earned a special prize. Miranda won and posted a short video to her profile. This game was based on fellow Netflix series Nailed It!.; Soon after, Alex entered The Circle as a catfish named Adam.
Week 2
5	5	"Sliding into DMs"	Days 4-5	January 8, 2020	TC-105	
"Adam"/Alex was given the ability to go on a dinner date with one of the players. In order to help him make his decision, he was able to chat with three players of his choosing. He chose "Mercedeze"/Karyn, "Rebecca"/Seaburn, and Sammie. Alex decided to go on the dinner date with "Rebecca"/Seaburn. He also sent along a giant teddy bear after The Circle prompted him to include a gift as part of the date. Then the ratings opened, and "Adam"/Alex was exempt from being rated.: Game ("Hashtag This"): Each player gets to post a new photo to their profile. Then, all players chose a hashtag that matched with the photo.; During the game, many of the players accused "Mercedeze"/Karyn of being a catfish.
6	6	"Anonymous Trolling"	Days 5-6	January 8, 2020	TC-106	
The ratings were revealed, and Shubham and Sammie, placing first and second respectively, became Influencers. Shubham and Sammie decided to block "Mercedeze"/Karyn. Karyn decides to visit Chris's apartment, revealing she was a catfish. During the video the next day, she reveals her real identity to everyone. Then Bill and Sean joined The Circle.
7	7	"Picking Teams"	Days 6-7	January 8, 2020	TC-107	
Bill and Sean made their profiles, with Sean using the photos of a friend.: Game ("Trivia Night"): The two new players, Bill and Sean, were tasked with picking two teams for a trivia night. Bill chose Chris, "Rebecca"/Seaburn, and Shubham; Sean chose Sammie, Joey, "Adam"/Alex, and Miranda. After Sean's team won, each team member received a video message from their family.; Soon after, the ratings opened, and Bill and Sean were exempt from being rated. Joey and Shubham became Influencers after placing first and second respectively. The Influencers arrived at the Hangout but, in a twist, they were not allowed to discuss whom to block. Instead, the Influencers were allowed to save two players each. The player who was not saved was blocked.
8	8	"The Player I'm Saving Is…"	Days 7-8	January 8, 2020	TC-108	
Sammie, "Rebecca"/Seaburn, Chris, and "Adam"/Alex were saved, meaning Miranda was blocked. She decided to visit Joey's apartment, where they shared a kiss. Overnight, Ed and Tammy joined The Circle, playing jointly as "Ed.": Game ("Portrait Mode"): Each player was given art supplies, a canvas, and a photo of one player to paint however they wanted. Then, after thirty minutes, their completed paintings were shared on The Circle.; Sean, who started to feel bad about using photos that weren't hers, had her emotions intensified by the game. She created a group chat with Chris, Sammie, and "Rebecca"/Seaburn and told them that she was not using her own photos. She then asked The Circle to send them a picture of her real self.
Week 3
9	9	"Instant Block"	Days 8-9	January 15, 2020	TC-109	
Sean sent a real photo of herself to Chris, Sammie, and "Rebecca"/Seaburn. Soon after, the ratings opened, and "Ed"/Ed&Tammy were exempt from being rated. Immediately after, the ratings were revealed. The player who was rated the least popular would automatically be blocked. After Bill was blocked, the two highest rated players, "Rebecca"/Seaburn and Shubham, became Influencers and had to block another player. They decided to block "Adam"/Alex. Bill was not given a chance to visit anyone face-to-face, but "Adam"/Alex went to "Rebecca"/Seaburn's apartment, where they both found out they were catfishing. The next day, Sean changed all of the pictures on her profile to her real photos. Then, Bill and "Adam"/Alex's videos were posted to the newsfeed, when they found out that "Adam"/Alex was a catfish.
10	10	"Declare Your Rival"	Days 9-10	January 15, 2020	TC-110	
Game ("State Your Case"): All the players had to state their case as to why they should win The Circle over their biggest rival. After they stated their case, their "rival" was able to make one response statement.; The ratings were opened, but the players were told that the ratings would not be revealed. The player who was ranked first became the "Superinfluencer" and made the sole decision on whom to block. Joey, who became the Superinfluencer, had to visit the apartment of the player he wanted to block. He visited Sean's apartment, meaning she was blocked. Sean's video was posted to the newsfeed.
11	11	"The Last Rating"	Days 10-12	January 15, 2020	TC-111	
Game ("Most Likely"): Players were given a "most likely" statement, which players would have to answer with one player's name that they think would fit the statement best. The answers were all sent to The Circle Chat, so no one's answers could be hidden.; The ratings then opened as the final rating of The Circle. However, what the players weren't told was that the player who received the lowest rating would be immediately blocked after the ratings. "Ed"/Ed&Tammy were rated the lowest, meaning they were blocked. They visited Sammie's apartment. Each of the remaining players who had not previously received a message from home (Chris, "Rebecca"/Seaburn, and Shubham) received one. The players, as part of finale night, all went to one room to meet each other face-to-face for the first time during the whole game.
12	12	"Finale"	Day 12	January 15, 2020	TC-112	
"Rebecca"/Seaburn entered the room, revealing he was a catfish to Shubham. Then, all the other players entered and found out as well. At finale night, Michelle Buteau talked with the blocked players before revealing the final ratings. Joey Sasso placed first and became the winner of The Circle. Shubham got second place, Sammie got third place, Chris got fourth place, and "Rebecca"/Seaburn got fifth place.

== Production ==
=== Development ===
The British version of the show premiered in 2018, and was renewed for its second season a few months after the first season ended. After the first season was Channel 4's "youngest profiling" show in six years, according to the British TV industry magazine Broadcast, talks began of international versions. On October 8, 2018, Netflix announced its partnership with All3Media to create three international versions of The Circle on Netflix, including the American version. Brandon Reigg, Netflix's Vice Principal of Unscripted Content, stated, "We think the show's combination of modern social media interaction and competition will captivate Netflix members around the world, in multiple languages, and we're delighted to partner with Studio Lambert and Motion to produce these three new local versions."

=== Casting ===
On April 11, 2019, casting opened for the first season through an online website.

In an interview with Variety, Tim Harcourt, one of the executive producers for Studio Lambert, stated that The Circle format and premise allowed the casting team to search for all different kinds of people. He noted how the casting contrasted from casts on show like Real Housewives or Jersey Shore and how those shows are "all one gang of quite similar characters." He explained how there was no set cast for the show until it was over. The first eight players to enter were all predetermined and planned, but everything after that was all luck to whoever got on. Harcourt stated that the production team would decide who would be the right fit depending on who just left the game, acknowledging that with thirteen contestants, not all who were possible players end up on the show at all.

=== Filming ===
In October 2019, it was reported that filming was completed. All filming was done in August 2019 before the British version's second season in September 2019, and was completed in fifteen days. It was also reported that the American version was filmed in Salford, England, using the same apartment building that was used in the second season of the British version. Attempts to obscure the filming location to appear to be in the United States were apparent, including overhead shots of the cities of Chicago and Milwaukee throughout the show, as well as aerial shots of the United Kingdom reversed so the cars appear to be driving on the right side of the road.

According to participant Joey Sasso, filming of the show took about a month. The contestants' apartments were brightly lit in part to allow the cameras to record them, but also to disorientate the players' perception of time; Sasso stated that they often had no idea what day or time of day it was, and he had taken to wearing sunglasses inside to cut off the glare from the lights which had been mistaken as a fashion statement by fans of the show. The contestants were given a few minutes each day to spend on the apartment complex's rooftop space.

=== Release ===
On December 10, 2019, a trailer for the American version was released, revealing the premiere date to be January 1, 2020, and the prize amount to be $100,000. On December 29, it was revealed by The New York Times that twelve episodes would be airing from January 1 to January 15 with four episodes being released every Wednesday as part of the "three week event." On December 30, 2019, in order to get more people interested in The Circle, Netflix released a thirty-minute cut of the hour-long first episode of the season on its YouTube channel for free. Then, starting on January 1 and lasting until January 15, Netflix dropped four episodes every week on Wednesday.

=== Fan Favorite vote ===
On January 8, 2020, via Twitter and Instagram, The Circle announced that voting had opened for the Fan Favorite award. The player who had received the most votes would win $10,000. Voting opened at midnight on January 8, 2020, PST, and lasted until midnight on January 17. The winner of the Fan Favorite vote was revealed to be Sammie Cimarelli on The Circle's Instagram on January 17.

== Results and elimination ==
Color key
This player was blocked.
This player was an influencer.
This player was immune from being blocked.

	Episode 1	Episode 3	Episode 6	Episode 7	Episode 9	Episode 10	Episode 11	Episode 12	
Joey	4th	=5th	=4th	1st	4th	Not published	1st		Winner (Episode 12)
Shubham	8th	=1st	1st	2nd	2nd	Not published	2nd		Runner-up (Episode 12)
Sammie	1st	=5th	2nd	=4th	5th	Not published	3rd		Third Place (Episode 12)
Chris	5th	=1st	=4th	=4th	3rd	Not published	4th		Fourth Place (Episode 12)
Seaburn "Rebecca"	6th	3rd	3rd	3rd	1st	Not published	5th		Fifth Place (Episode 12)
Ed & Tammy "Ed"	Not in The Circle				Exempt	Not published	6th	Blocked (Episode 11)	
Sean	Not in The Circle			Exempt	6th	Not published	Blocked (Episode 10)		
Alex "Adam"	Not in The Circle		Exempt	6th	7th	Blocked (Episode 9)			
Bill	Not in The Circle			Exempt	8th	Blocked (Episode 9)			
Miranda	Not in The Circle	Exempt	6th	7th	Blocked (Episode 8)				
Karyn "Mercedeze"	7th	4th	7th	Blocked (Episode 6)					
Antonio	2nd	7th	Blocked (Episode 4)						
Alana	3rd	Blocked (Episode 1)							
Notes	none			1	2	3	4		
Influencers	Antonio, Sammie	Chris, Shubham	Sammie, Shubham	Joey, Shubham	Seaburn, Shubham	Joey	none		
Blocked	Alana; Influencers' choice to block	Antonio; Influencers' choice to block	Karyn "Mercedeze"; Influencers' choice to block	Miranda; Influencers' choice to not save	Bill; Lowest- rated player	Sean; Superinfluencer's choice to block	Ed & Tammy "Ed"; Lowest- rated player	Seaburn "Rebecca"; Lowest- rated player	Chris; Fourth highest rated player
Blocked	Alana; Influencers' choice to block	Antonio; Influencers' choice to block	Karyn "Mercedeze"; Influencers' choice to block	Miranda; Influencers' choice to not save	Alex "Adam"; Influencers' choice to block	Sean; Superinfluencer's choice to block	Ed & Tammy "Ed"; Lowest- rated player	Sammie; Third highest rated player	Shubham; Second highest- rated player
Blocked	Alana; Influencers' choice to block	Antonio; Influencers' choice to block	Karyn "Mercedeze"; Influencers' choice to block	Miranda; Influencers' choice to not save	Alex "Adam"; Influencers' choice to block	Sean; Superinfluencer's choice to block	Ed & Tammy "Ed"; Lowest- rated player	Joey; Highest- rated player	

=== Notes ===
- ^Note 1 : In Episode 7, the Influencers were not allowed to deliberate over who to block. Instead, the Influencers took turns saving other players with the player not saved being blocked from The Circle. Joey, as the higher rating player, began by saving Sammie, then Shubham saved Seaburn, and Joey saved Chris. With the final selection, Shubham saved Adam, leaving Miranda blocked from The Circle.
- ^Note 2 : In Episode 9, the lowest-rated player, Bill, was immediately blocked from The Circle. Then, the new Influencers went to the Hangout and blocked another player.
- ^Note 3 : In Episode 10, the ratings were not published. Instead, the highest-rated player automatically became the "Superinfluencer," who could make the sole decision on whom to block.
- ^Note 4 : In Episode 11, the players made their final ratings. However, the person who came in the last place was immediately blocked from The Circle before the finale.

== Reception ==
The Circle received positive reviews from critics. On the review aggregator website Rotten Tomatoes, the season holds an 80% approval rating with an average rating of 6 out of 10 based on 15 reviews. The Circle also became the topic of discussion on the sixth episode of I Like to Watch, where drag queens Trixie Mattel and Katya Zamolodchikova reacted to the first episode. Because of the positive reviews and large number of viewers, Netflix renewed The Circle for a second and third season on March 24, 2020.

Once the show began airing, it was well received. Megh Wright from Vulture proclaimed that The Circle is a "fascinating series" that gives a "brutally honest reflection of the fractured way we attempt to connect to each other today." Kate Knibbs from Wired declared it the "best TV show about the internet" that "actually takes its audience places, dramatizing the experience of online social interactions in all their fizz and slipperiness." The show was also praised for its diverse cast and personalities. According to Etan Smallman of The New York Times, this type of diversity is what makes The Circle so unique among other reality TV shows.

Meanwhile, Isaac Feldberg from Fortune told readers to skip The Circle because of "the aggressively irritating manner in which the series has been put together." Jerrica Tisdale from Screen Rant called the series a "must-see." She comments on how common it is to "develop entire relationships through solely digital interactions," and that is what The Circle is trying to explore.

Nev Schulman, host and executive producer of Catfish: The TV Show criticized The Circle in an interview with People. He said that when you remove the realistic circumstances and realistic people with normal personalities, it is less entertaining than realism. He also expressed disappointment at the use of the word "catfish"; he cites the definition to be "a complicated person who, for any number of reasons and personal struggles, has found themselves creating a profile of varying veracity or truths to explore, and interact, and discover themselves", whereas on The Circle, players use it to simply call someone a liar. Despite these statements, he admits he still watches and enjoys the show.

Aja Romano of Vox praised The Circle for embracing inauthenticity as a part of social media and human nature as a whole. She likens The Circle to a microcosm of social media, saying "Instead of treating 'being fake on the internet' as a shocking betrayal, The Circle embraces it as something we all do in big and small ways, often in the service of making friends and fitting in." She also praises the cast. She mentions how the cast shares very personal things frequently, even through the anonymity of The Circle. Romano states that the cast developed character arcs, and the production team could get away with making a narrative structure.
