= Chloe Veitch =

English model and media personality

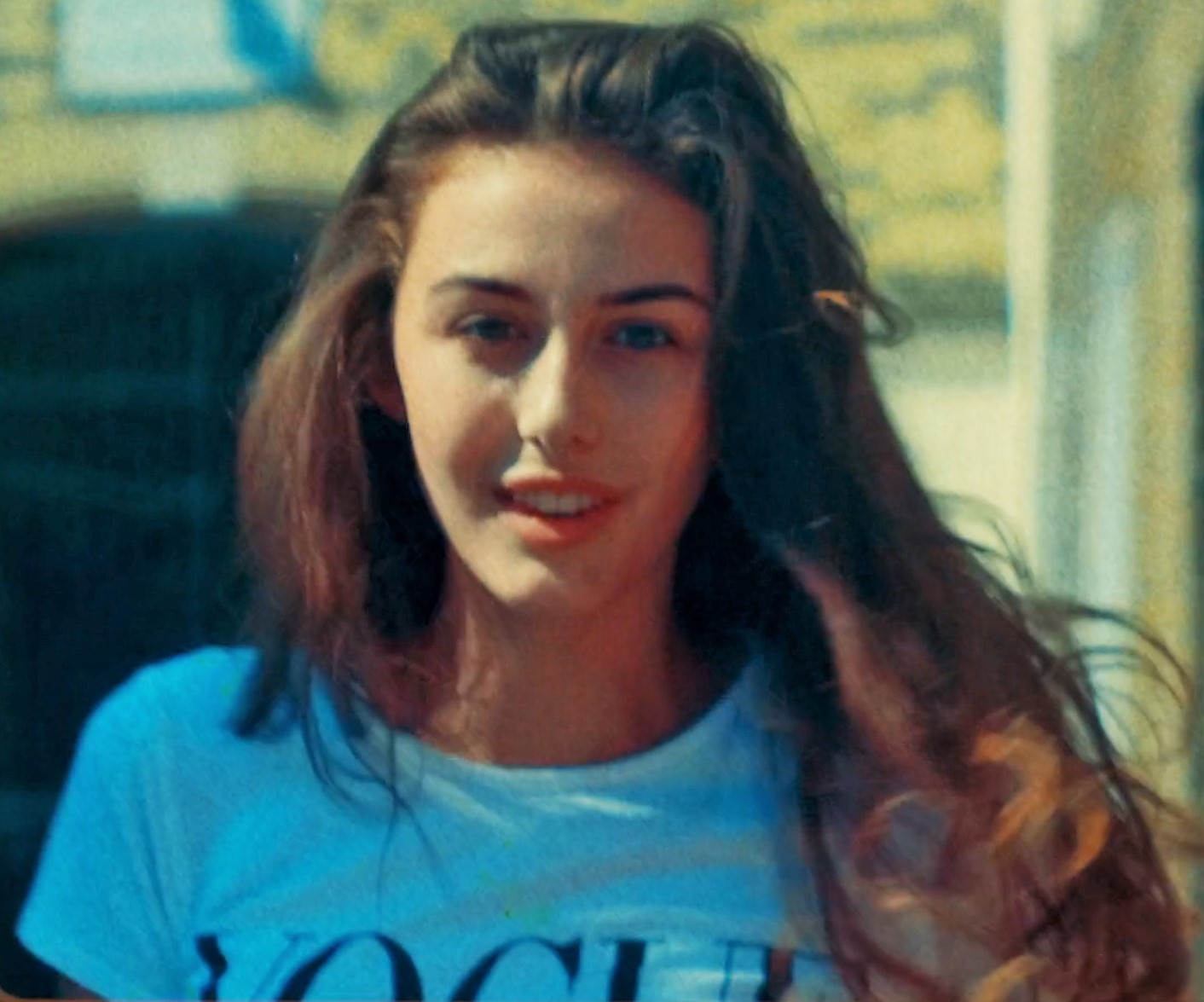
- Veitch modeling in 2018
- Born: 6 March 1999 (age 27); Essex, England
- Education: Clacton Coastal Academy
- Occupations: Model; media personality
- Years active: 2020–present

Chloe Veitch (born 6 March 1999) is an English model, media personality and beauty queen of Miss Supertalent 2018. She is best known for her appearances in Too Hot to Handle (2020), The Circle (2021) and Perfect Match (2023). Veitch has also appeared on Channel 4's Celebrity Ghost Trip (2021), where she was partnered with Too Hot to Handle co-star Nicole O'Brien, and Celebrity Hunted (2022).

Veitch was joint winner of Netflix's first series of Too Hot to Handle. She was also voted as the runner-up and won the "Fan Favorite" award for the second season of The Circle.

== Biography ==
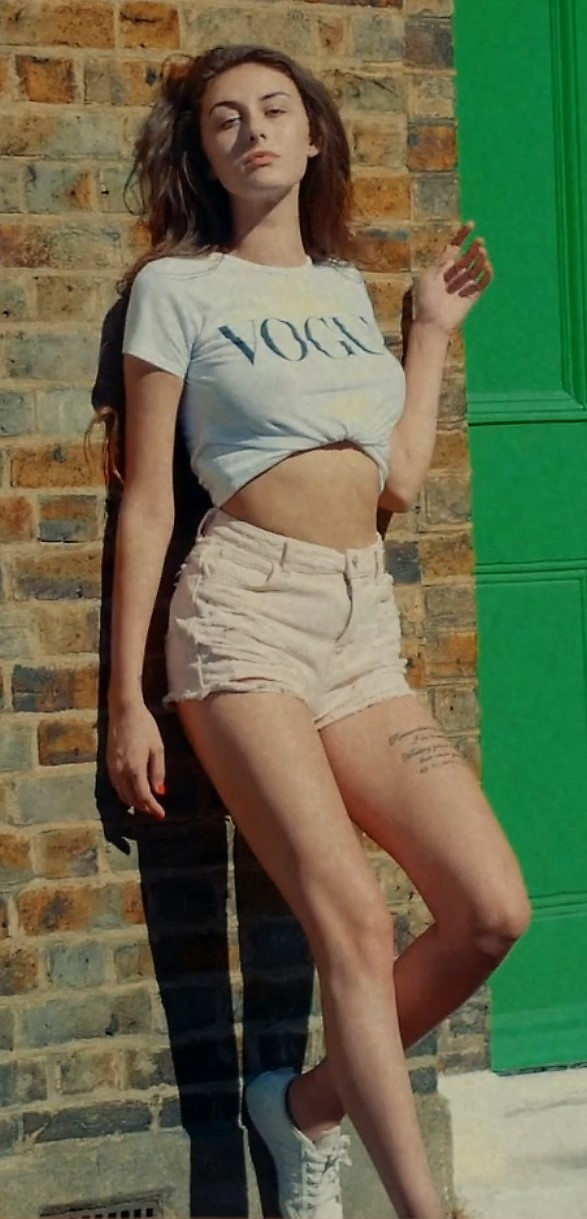
Veitch in 2018

Veitch grew up in Clacton-on-Sea in Essex, and went to Clacton Coastal Academy school. Before appearing on Too Hot to Handle, Veitch was an estate agent and model. Veitch currently lives in London and has stated that she plans to move to the United States of America for work. She is openly bisexual.

== Filmography ==
=== Television ===
| Year | Title | Role | Notes |
|---|---|---|---|
| 2019 | Muchh | GF & Manager | Short film |
| 2020 | Too Hot to Handle | Contestant | Season 1: Winner (9 episodes) |
| 2021 | The Circle US | Contestant | Season 2: Runner-up/Fan Favorite (13 episodes) |
| 2021 | Celebrity Ghost Trip | Contestant | Season 1 |
| 2022 | Celebrity Hunted | Contestant | Season 4: 3rd place |
| 2022 | Eating with my Ex | Herself | 1 episode |
| 2023 | Perfect Match | Contestant | Season 1 |
| 2024 | Celebrity Ex on the Beach | Main cast | Season 3 |
| 2025 | Sneaky Links: Dating After Dark | Host | Season 1 |
| 2026 | Outside | Contestant | Season 1 |
