= Sneaky Links: Dating After Dark =

- Promotional poster
- Presented by: Chloe Veitch
- No. of contestants: 18
- No. of episodes: 10

Release
- Original network: Netflix
- Original release: May 21, 2025

Sneaky Links: Dating After Dark is a reality dating television series. It premiered on Netflix on May 21, 2025. The show is hosted by Chloe Veitch and features Spicy Mari as a dating expert. The series was filmed at the Hotel Adeline in Scottsdale, Arizona.

== Format ==
Sneaky Links: Dating After Dark is a reality dating series where many of the contestants are each other's "sneaky links", or casual flings, who are meant to "discover if they are meant to be, or just getting in the way of finding long-lasting love".

The contestants regularly meet with Chloe and Spicy Mari for "Link Lowdowns", where they have frank conversations about their progress. Spicy Mari uses these discussions and her observations of the singles throughout their stay to assess when a guest has gotten everything they can out of the process, and tells them when it is time to check out of the Sneaky Links motel.

While at the motel, the guests and their respective sneaky links participate in activities designed to test their compatibility and push them to think about long-term commitment instead of keeping things casual. Through challenges and dates, each single must decide whether to deepen the connection with their sneaky link, explore new romantic possibilities, or leave the motel single. Soon after their arrival, the guests are granted "overnight phone privileges", allowing them to call any other guest to arrange a late-night meeting. The contestants must consider whether they will fall back into old patterns or choose to evolve. In the end, each member of the remaining couples must decide whether to check out together through the lobby and make their relationship public, or leave alone.

== Contestants ==
Name	Age	Sneaky Link	Entered	Exited	Status
Avery Wadbrook	25	Colt	Episode 1	Episode 10	Relationship
Manny Garcia	25	Samira	Episode 1	Episode 10	Relationship
Travis Arenas	30	Angelique	Episode 1	Episode 10	Relationship
Zoe Martin	28	Kyle	Episode 1	Episode 10	Relationship
Colt Fason	31	Avery	Episode 1	Episode 10	Relationship
Kelsey Tomlin	24	–	Episode 4	Episode 10	Relationship
Brandon Limeres	26	Nicole S.	Episode 1	Episode 10	Single
Jacie Allain	25	–	Episode 7	Episode 10	Single
Angelique Wilcox	29	Travis	Episode 1	Episode 9	Eliminated
David Kartozia	26	–	Episode 7	Episode 9	Eliminated
Justin Briggs	26	–	Episode 7	Episode 9	Eliminated
Lauren "Lulu" Williams	22	–	Episode 7	Episode 9	Eliminated
Logan Ventura	30	Nicole V.	Episode 1	Episode 8	Eliminated
Nicole Vinson	27	Logan	Episode 1	Episode 8	Eliminated
Corinthian Lyles	32	–	Episode 4	Episode 8	Eliminated
Nicole Serrano	27	Brandon	Episode 1	Episode 8	Eliminated
Kyle	28	Zoe	Episode 1	Episode 3	Eliminated
Samira Valentina	23	Manny	Episode 1	Episode 3	Eliminated

== Episodes ==
No. overall	No. in season	Title	Original release date
1	1	"Sneaky Surprise"	May 21, 2025
Angelique, Avery, Brandon, Colt, Kyle, Logan, Manny, Nicole S., Nicole V., Samira, Travis, and Zoe check into the motel.: Challenge: Each contestant is partnered with their sneaky link. Relationship expert Spicy Mari helps each contestant develop trust with their sneaky link. Everyone reflects on how they have approached relationships so far, considers why they have sneaky links, and how to leave them in the past. Each contestant answers personal questions.; Link Lowdown: Each contestant is given a phone in their room with which they can call anyone in the motel, a way to test whether contestants are sticking to their old habits or evolving.; Colt & Angelique meet up as a sneaky link.
2	2	"Hearts in Motion"	May 21, 2025
Challenge: Each contestant is paired with their sneaky link. They are given a half-assembled tandem bike, which they must work together to make rideable. Once the bike is rideable, the teams receive a map guiding them to a secret location, where a bonding box with a camera awaits. Each team must take a photo with it and reflect on how they work together before returning to the hotel. Zoe and Kyle finish the activity first, but since the challenge also emphasizes communication and compromise, they do not win. Colt and Avery have a difficult start but are supportive of each other; they persevere and grow closer as a couple. As a result, they earn a date that evening.; Brandon & Nicole S., Colt & Angelique, and Manny & Nicole V. all meet up as sneaky links.: Link Lowdown: Spicy Mari talks to each couple. Zoe and Kyle are told that their spark is not burning brightly at the moment and that they should invest more time in their potential. Brandon and Nicole S. are told they are both good at celebrating each other's strengths. Manny and Samira are told they have reached a crossroads, are living in the past, and need to make decisions about the future. They both agree it is time for them to move on.
3	3	"Crossed Wires"	May 21, 2025
Link Lowdown: Spicy Mari informs Manny and Samira they will be getting another opportunity and are staying in the motel. They both have to use the phone to call someone and set up a date the next day. Each sneaky link has to decide if they want to start a relationship or explore other connections. Each sneaky link is challenged to have a heart-to-heart conversation about where they stand.; Manny & Avery, Angelique & Colt, and Logan & Nicole V. all meet up as sneaky links. Manny chooses to go on a date with Avery, while Samira chooses to go on a date with Travis. Colt & Angelique, Manny & Nicole V., and Travis & Nicole S. all meet up as sneaky links the next night. Kyle attempts to have a sneaky link with Nicole V., Angelique, and Samira.: Link Lowdown: Colt and Angelique move on from their sneaky links and officially become a new couple. They are rewarded with the Spicy Suite. Samira and Kyle check out of the Sneaky Links motel as their connection is not there.; Nicole V. & Logan choose to explore other connections. Nicole V. & Brandon meet up as a sneaky link.
4	4	"Loyalty vs. Lust"	May 21, 2025
Brandon and Nicole S. choose to explore other connections.: Challenge: The contestants are divided into two teams. Each team receives a basket of eggs with emotions written on them. The teams take turns throwing the eggs at each other. If the egg is caught, the contestant must describe a time they felt the emotion written on it. Each team has a total of 20 throws. The team with the most unbroken eggs wins. The red team, consisting of Brandon, Colt, Logan, Nicole V., and Zoe, wins the challenge and receives tickets to the party that night.; The contestants are informed that two new guests will be checking in that evening. Corinthian and Kelsey check into the motel. Colt & Angelique and Travis & Nicole S. both meet up as sneaky links. The next day, Corinthian and Kelsey are challenged to make a connection with another guest; if they fail, they will check out later that night. They each have the opportunity to pick someone for a massage to explore a connection. Kelsey chooses Colt, while Corinthian chooses Zoe.
5	5	"The Choice Is Yours"	May 21, 2025
Link Lowdown: Zoe and Angelique stand up for Corinthian, explaining why they both want to explore a connection with him. This extends his stay in the motel. Colt, Brandon, and Logan all stand up for Kelsey, explaining why they want to build a connection with her. This extends her stay as well. Colt apologizes to Angelique for exploring his connection with Kelsey and for disrespecting her in the way he went about it. Angelique responds by calling both of them disrespectful for how they handled exploring their connection. Spicy Mari asks the guests to consider who their strongest connection is. At the next Link Lowdown, they will have to commit to one person.; Colt & Angelique, Travis & Zoe, and Brandon & Avery all meet up for a sneaky link.: Challenge: The men have 45 minutes to cook a dish, and can only cook for one woman of their choice. Corinthian and Travis cook for Zoe; Logan and Colt choose Angelique; Manny cooks for Nicole V.; Brandon chooses Avery; and Colt makes a second dish for Kelsey. Nicole S. does not receive a dish.; Corinthian & Zoe meet up for a sneaky link. Colt attempts to meet Angelique for a sneaky link.
6	6	"Temptation & Turmoil"	May 21, 2025
Link Lowdown: The guests must choose one other guest they wish to commit to. Manny chooses Nicole V., but she does not feel a connection with him; instead she reveals she has not found the connection she wants in the motel. Brandon and Avery commit to each other. Logan decides he does not have a connection with anyone and does not want to force anything. Travis and Corinthian both choose to commit to Zoe, but Zoe chooses to commit to Travis. Nicole S. decides to commit to Corinthian, and he does the same in return to explore their connection. Angelique and Kelsey both choose to commit to Colt. Colt makes a last-minute decision and commits to Angelique. Everyone not coupled stays at the hotel, as Spicy Mari decides they have more to learn.; Colt calls Kelsey to apologize and check in with her. Colt & Angelique meet as a sneaky link.: Challenge: Each couple has to explore their connection through art. They have one hour to create a painting that shows how they see their partner. The singles are paired with other singles. Corinthian and Nicole S. are chosen as the winners and win a dinner date.; The guests play a game of spin the bottle. Avery and Manny meet up as a sneaky link. Brandon attempts to have a sneaky link with Avery.: Link Lowdown: Angelique and Colt are challenged to explore their mental connection with each other. Avery reveals that she and Manny are trying to explore their connection again, and the two officially commit to each other. Nicole S. ends things with Corinthian. The three couples share a couples' cocktail, while the remaining singles meet the new guests checking in.
7	7	"Second Chances and Second Place"	May 21, 2025
David, Jacie, Justin, and Lulu check into the motel. The next day, the guests attend a party where the new guests are given the opportunity to connect with whomever they want and pick someone for a date. Lulu picks Colt, David picks Nicole V., Jacie picks Brandon, and Justin picks Kelsey. Brandon and Jacie meet up as a sneaky link. David attempts to meet up with Nicole V., and Kelsey and Colt meet up to reconnect.
8	8	"Written in the Stars"	May 21, 2025
Angelique and Colt end their connection. Nicole V. also ends her connection with David.: Link Lowdown: The four new singles are safe from being eliminated. Brandon is asked whether he is learning from the process, as he keeps jumping from one woman to another, but is given one last chance to make a proper connection. Nicole S., Corinthian, Nicole V., and Logan all check out of the motel as their connections are not there. Kelsey is able to stay as Spicy Mari believes her connection is still there.; Kelsey & Colt meet up as a sneaky link.: Challenge: Each couple explores their connection through astrology. Kelsey & Colt and Manny & Avery are shown to be the two most compatible couples. As a result, Manny and Avery get a stargazing date and a trip to the Spicy Suite.
9	9	"Life Beyond the Motel"	May 21, 2025
The couples go on dates to discuss what their future looks like outside of the motel. The singles discuss how they plan to change their sneaky link ways in the future.: Link Lowdown: David, Justin, and Lulu are sent home as they haven't made a connection in the motel. Angelique's time at the motel has come to an end as her connection is not there, though Spicy Mari applauds her for the progress she made there. With vacancies now at the motel, the four couples are reunited with their friends and family.
10	10	"The Checkout"	May 21, 2025
The guests are reunited with one of their family members or friends, and each decides whether they want their connection to meet the visitor. Jacie does not want her sister to meet Brandon, but Brandon lets her meet his father. Avery and Manny meet each other's mothers, both of whom approve of the other. Travis meets Zoe's friend, while Zoe meets his sister. Kelsey meets Colt's mother, who does not approve of her.: Link Lowdown: Chloe tells the couples they must spend the night alone and decide whether they want to check out of the motel as a couple or leave single.; Manny and Avery check out as a couple. Brandon chooses to check out with Jacie, but Jacie checks out single. Travis and Zoe check out as a couple, as do Colt and Kelsey.

== Post filming ==
Couples	Still together	Relationship notes
Avery Wadbrook and Manny Garcia	Yes	Wadbrook and Garcia are still together as of October 2025.
Travis Arenas and Zoe Martin	No	Arenas and Martin split in August 2025.
Colt Fason and Kelsey Tomlin	No	Fason and Tomlin broke up less than a month after filming ended. Fason claimed the breakup was due to not being able to spend time together, but Tomlin said they broke up right when the season wrapped.
