= List of Privileged characters =

This article contains character information for the American teen drama, Privileged. The series is based on the Alloy Entertainment book How to Teach Filthy Rich Girls by best-selling author Zoey Dean. The series focuses mainly on the character of Megan Smith (JoAnna Garcia), a recent Yale graduate who has been hired to tutor two spoiled rich twins, Rose (Lucy Hale) and Sage Baker (Ashley Newbrough) in a wealthy area of Palm Beach, Florida. Other characters include friends and family members of Megan and the twins.

== Main characters ==
The following are characters who have led the plot, as listed in the order of the opening television credits of each episode.

Name	Actor or actress	Seasons	Episode count
Megan Smith	JoAnna Garcia	1	18
A Yale graduate who grew up in Fort Lauderdale, Megan is a frustrated writer. In the first episode she leaves her job at a New York women's magazine, because career advancement within the magazine only gives her the option to write about subjects she considers banal, rather than opening her up to the freedom of topic she had been expecting. However, a stroke of networking luck means that her former boss can secure her a position as a tutor with a wealthy and well-respected family. Megan returns to South Florida to assume the role of tutor to the Baker twins, who happen to live on the rich side of her hometown. Megan's quirky and pro-knowledge nature is a stark contrast to the sophisticated and rich life that the twins live and makes it increasingly difficult for Megan to do her job. Despite moving back so near to home, the only local person Megan tells is her best friend Charlie. As a child, she was abandoned by her mother and she and her sister were left in the hands of their alcoholic father. Megan buried herself in school work and cut off contact with her family after she went to Yale. Megan has a rocky relationship with her sister Lily, and due to a tough family life, is very wary of getting back in touch with her father, even asking her sister to cover for her, once Lily discovers Megan back in town. Megan befriends her neighbour named Will, who initially appears to be a potential love-interest, until Lily starts dating him. Megan has been hurt in the past, and therefore projects her need for a family onto Sage and Rose, the twins she is tutoring, whilst idolising their Grandmother Laurel, hoping to write her biography. The main drama comes from Megan's misplaced need for affection, as she attempts to fix others problems instead of fixing exactly the same ones in her own life.
Rose Baker	Lucy Hale	1	18
Rose is the meeker of the Baker twins and has big dreams of attending Duke University to honor her mother's memory. While Rose is more inclined to accept Megan's help and guidance, she feels obligated to follow her sister in what she wants to do. However, she's doing worse in school than Sage, and it becomes hard for her to do well in school and live up to social expectations. She was almost forced to repeat freshman year before Megan made a deal with the Dean. Rose begins as the quieter twin, but has a lot in common with Megan, as she also likes to try to make everyone happy, instead of thinking about her own problems. She attempts to fix things through lying, for example, after Lily appears to steal one of her tennis bracelets, and is accused in public by Megan, she lies and says she lent it to a friend named Precious and simply forgot about it, thinking that would cause Megan and Lily to make up. She looks up to her sister Sage to the extent that she has no true outside friends, as she thinks her relationship with her sister is all she needs in life.
Sage Baker	Ashley Newbrough	1	18
Strong and opinionated, Sage is extremely protective of Rose, and also lets no-one else in between them. Sage instantly resents Megan for trying to rein her in and for stealing the attention of Rose. Sage is determined to become famous, in part to rub it in her "friends'" faces, and doesn't see school as a priority in her life. She takes the opposite road to Rose, in the sense that she is so focused on a career as a model/singer/whatever the publicist thinks she can do, rather than schoolwork. Sage manages to maintain "B"-level grades and doesn't think having Megan around is necessary. Sage doesn't realize how important school is to Rose, and that Rose is simply not as intelligent as her. Sage repeatedly tries to sabotage Megan, going so far as to bring her estranged and bitter sister back into her life. Sage thinks she has Rose's best interests at heart, and means well, but where Rose meddles to make things better for others, Sage meddles to make things better for herself, thinking that she knows best. She falls in love with a new cook named Luis.
Charlie Hogan	Michael Cassidy	1	14
Charlie is a childhood friend of Megan's who stayed behind in Palm Beach after Megan went to Yale. He eventually dropped out of college and works as a waiter at a beach restaurant called The Crab Shack. Charlie harbors a secret crush for Megan, making him prone to doing her favors and helping her with situations that he otherwise doesn't care about. Megan uses him as someone to complain to, and he obliges. While Charlie thinks he is in love with Megan initially, when he meets Mandy, a girl who will talk straight instead of thinking about other's feelings too much, she helps him realize that he just uses Megan as an excuse not to move into new relationships. By idolizing Megan and never saying how he feels, he does not ever have to deal with the reality of a grownup relationship. He eventually accepts that Megan will never be with him, and tries unsuccessfully to push her out of his life.
Marco Giordani	Allan Louis	1	17
The talented personal chef of Laurel Limoges, who never appears to sleep, Marco is always on-hand to provide advice for Megan. He is the closest thing Megan has to a friend in her new environment. He aspires to open a glamorous restaurant one day and is continually praised by others for his excellent cooking skills. Unlike Charlie, Marco is brutally honest when helping Megan deal with her problems, though he finds the dramas in her life entertaining. Even though he is mildly irritated at her inability to understand that he is always working when she asks, and he has a life beyond the house, her dramas do keep him amusingly diverted. He is gay, but aside from that we never learn about his outside life. His kitchen is a primary setting in the series.
Will Davis	Brian Hallisay	1	16
Will is the handsome and charming, not to mention wealthy, next door neighbor of Laurel Limoges. Megan had romantic feelings for him, but the situation became more complicated when her sister Lily hooked up with him after a party. He initially dates Lily, but once her character is compromised, and he cannot trust her, he begins to set his sights on Megan. He wants to be taken for more than the Son of a Billionaire, and so rather than get a job from his dad, he works as a runner for a top photographer. He is interested in a career as a sports photographer, but he feels he needs to work his way up in the industry like everyone else.
Lily Smith	Kristina Apgar	1	10
Lily is the estranged sister of Megan who reenters her life after her return to Palm Beach. Lily and Megan had a falling out after Megan came home from college to find Lily having sex with her boyfriend. Lily is the opposite of Megan. She reacted in a different way to Megan - where difficulties made Megan throw herself into work, Lily rebelled, seemingly waiting for someone to stop her. She is continually on the defensive, and like Megan, doesn't trust easily. Lily becomes romantically involved with Will, but is surprised to learn that Megan was interested in him. While Lily continually claims that she has changed, she still exhibits behaviors and qualities that make her appear jaded.
Laurel Limoges	Anne Archer	1	10
Laurel is the grandmother of Rose and Sage Baker. She is a wealthy woman who built a fortune for herself and her family, only for her world to come crashing down when one her daughter dies in a plane crash. She is very busy, running an international makeup company named Limoges. Set with raising her teenage granddaughters, Laurel is more willing to give the responsibility of parenting to Megan while she runs her business. She is a source of inspiration for Megan, who desperately wants to write her biography and find success as she did. She is also slow to open up, due to the tragedy of her daughter's death, but this has caused a rift between her and her granddaughters, one she takes a very long time to realize. She is also hiding a family secret, one which Megan will uncover later into the series.

== Recurring characters ==
Name	Actor or actress	Seasons	Episode count
Rami	Rizwan Manji	1	8
The butler who is jealous of the special attention Megan gets as the tutor and responds coldly to her attempts at friendly conversation.
Mandy	Alice Greczyn	1	7
A coworker of Charlie's whom he uses as a means to move on from his feelings for Megan. Mandy is frustrated by Megan's constant interference with Charlie's life and she accuses him of not caring about her problems. She later apologizes, citing her frustration with her landlord for evicting her, prompting Charlie to invite her to move in with him.
Geraldine	Stacy Barnhisel	1	7
Laurel's personal assistant who is jealous of how close Megan is to Laurel, despite her having worked there for a shorter time. Laurel is very impatient with her, as she tends to interrupt during pivotal moments.
Jordanna	Melissa Ordway	1	6
A friend of Rose and Sage and the sister of Breckyn. She spiked Sage's drink, causing her to break out into a rash, after Sage threw a party just so no one would go to hers.

== Minor characters ==
Name	Actor or actress	Seasons	Episode count
Luis	Ignacio Serricchio	1	5
Charlie's cousin who is working as Marco's assistant in order to gain credibility for culinary school. He and Sage initially clash, but Sage unintentionally forms a crush on him.
Breckyn	Ally Maki	1	4
A friend of Rose and Sage and the sister of Jordanna. She spiked Sage's drink, causing her to break out into a rash, after Sage threw a party just so no one would go to hers.
Max	Andrew J. West	1	4
Rose's on-again-off-again boyfriend. She breaks up with him after she refuses to have sex with him.
Jacob Cassidy	David Giuntoli	1	4
The Dean of Rose and Sage's school who becomes romantically involved with Megan after they meet to discuss Rose's grades. Megan is scared that their relationship would cause her trouble, so she made Jacob keep it a secret, as well as put up with constant interruptions from Rose and Sage's drama. As the relationship progressed, however, Megan became more comfortable and made the relationship known, only to discover that Jacob had had a sexual relationship with a student the previous year, causing her to end the relationship.
Arthur Smith	John Allen Nelson	1	4
Megan's estranged father whom she reunites with upon discovering that he had stopped drinking.
Zachary	Dave Franco	1	4
Zachary is a new love interest for Rose.
Shelby	Sharon Lawrence	1	3
Shelby is Megan and Lily's mother. She abandoned the family when Megan was seven, and came back into their lives after Arther contacted her during the forgiveness step of AA. Megan refuses to forgive her, but fakes it after her father says that if she can't forgive her mother, she shouldn't forgive him for neglecting her either. However, Megan's plan falls apart after Shelby decides to stay and be as part of the family.
Keith	David Monahan	1	3
Marco's ex-boyfriend who broke up with Marco after he refused to follow through with opening his restaurant.
Dale Dart	Leslie Jordan	1	2
Lily's boss who encourages Megan to bring rich customers to the salon. He informs her of Lily's marriage to "Sleazy" Sammy, which he attended but she did not.
Patricia Kingston	Kathy Najimy	1	2
Rose and Sage's new publicist.
David Besser	Robert Buckley	1	2
The new and young editor for the new magazine that Will's father has recently bought, but he doesn't give Megan the opportunity to work at the magazine since he feels that the relationship between her and Will will cause problems.
Debra Wurtzel	Debi Mazar	1	1
The editor of a New York tabloid and Megan's former employer. Feeling bad for firing Megan after her apartment burnt down, Debra recommended Megan to Laurel for a job as a tutor.
Sammy	Luke Edwards	1	1
Lily's Sleazy on-and-off boyfriend whom Megan and Arther strongly disapprove of. Lily marries Sammy without telling her family, and is away on their honeymoon when her mother returns.
Miles Franklin	Michael Nouri	1	1
Laurel's former boss who got her pregnant after a one-night stand while her husband was away at war. He is the biological grandfather of Rose and Sage, and he and Laurel reunite after Megan unearths this information. However, Miles believes that the differences between him and Laurel are too great for them to have the relationship they want, and they part amicably.
