= Lily Smith (disambiguation) =

Lily Smith was a fictional character in Home and Away.

Lily Smith may also refer to:

- Lily Casey Smith, character in Half Broke Horses
- Lily Smith, character in 8 Mile
- Lily Smith, on List of Privileged characters
