= The Ultimatum: Marry or Move On =

Dating reality television series

- Genre: Reality
- Created by: Chris Coelen
- Presented by: Nick Lachey; Vanessa Lachey
- Country of origin: United States
- Original language: English
- No. of seasons: 4
- No. of episodes: 40

Production
- Executive producers: Chris Coelen; Chris Cullen; Eric Detwiler; Sarah Dillistone; Kelly Montalvo; Stephanie Boyriven; James Smith-Hill
- Running time: 35–58 minutes
- Production company: Kinetic Content

Original release
- Network: Netflix
- Release: April 6, 2022 – present

Related
- The Ultimatum: Queer Love

The Ultimatum: Marry or Move On is a dating reality television series created by Chris Coelen and produced by Kinetic Content that premiered on Netflix on April 6, 2022. The show is hosted by Nick and Vanessa Lachey.

The series has aired for four seasons. An international version The Ultimatum: France premiered in 2022. A spin-off series The Ultimatum: Queer Love premiered in 2023.

== Format ==
The Ultimatum is a self-proclaimed social experiment that wants to see how many couples will get married when presented with ultimatums. The show features couples on the verge of marriage. Each pair has eight weeks to decide whether they want to get married or split forever. Couples will later be split up as they choose new partners from the rest of the group, and then move in with them for three weeks for a trial marriage. Then they move in with their original partners for three weeks for a second trial marriage.

== Contestants ==
Season 1
Issuing ultimatum	Age	Partner	Age
April Marie	23	Jake Cunningham	26
Colby Kissinger	25	Madlyn Ballatori	24
Rae Williams	24	Zay Wilson	25
Shanique Imari	24	Randall Griffen	26
Alexis Maloney	25	Hunter Parr	28
Nate Ruggles	30	Lauren Pounds	29

Season 2
Issuing ultimatum	Age	Partner	Age
Antonio Mattei	30	Roxanne Kaiser	31
Lisa Horne	32	Brian Okoye	29
Ryann McCracken	24	James Morris	24
Trey Brunson	29	Riah Nyree	25
Kat Shelton	28	Alex Chapman	32

Season 3
Issuing ultimatum	Age	Partner	Age
Mariah	24	Caleb	29
Zaina	32	J.R.	33
Nick	38	Sandy	27
Scotty	30	Aria	25
Vanessa	30	Dave	34
Chanel	27	Micah	28

Season 4
Issuing ultimatum	Age	Partner	Age
Blake	26	Hayley	23
Ashley	26	Killian	29
Casey	34	David	33
Luke	30	Monica	28
Jessica Grace	35	Edris	39
Alex	23	Jebin	23

=== Future appearances ===
Zay Wilson competed on the first season of Perfect Match. Jake Cunningham competed on the second season. J.R. Warren and Sandy Gallagher competed on the third season.

== Season summary ==
=== Season 1 ===
Trial marriages
Contestants	Result
Jake and Rae	Relationship (Note: The couple split after leaving the show.)
Colby and April	Split
Zay and Shanique	Split
Randall and Madlyn	Split

Overview
Original couple	Result	Status
April and Jake	Split	Split
Colby and Madlyn	Married	Married
Rae and Zay	Split	Split
Shanique and Randall	Engaged	Married
Alexis and Hunter	Engaged (Note: The couple left the show early after they got engaged in Episode 3.)	Married
Nate and Lauren	Engaged	Married

=== Season 2 ===
Trial marriages
Contestants	Result
Antonio and Kat	Split
James and Riah	Split
Trey and Ryann	Split
Alex and Roxanne	Split

Overview
Original couple	Result	Status
Antonio and Roxanne	Engaged	Married
Lisa and Brian	Relationship (Note: The couple left the show early in Episode 3.)	Engaged
Ryann and James	Engaged	Married
Trey and Riah	Engaged	Married
Kat and Alex	Engaged	Married

=== Season 3 ===
Trial marriages
Contestants	Result
Mariah and Micah	Split
Chanel and Dave	Split
Vanessa and Nick	Split
Sandy and J.R.	Split
Zaina and Scotty	Split
Aria and Caleb	Split

Overview
Original couple	Result	Status
Mariah and Caleb	Engaged	Split
Zaina and J.R.	Split	Split
Sandy and Nick	Split	Split
Aria and Scotty	Engaged	Split
Vanessa and Dave	Relationship (Note: The couple left the show early in Episode 4.)	Engaged
Chanel and Micah	Relationship	Engaged

=== Season 4 ===
Trial marriages
Contestants	Result
Hayley and Killian	Split
Ashley and Blake	Split
Casey and Luke	Split
Monica and David	Split

Overview
Original couple	Result	Status
Hayley and Blake	Engaged	Split
Ashley and Killian	Engaged	Split
Casey and David	Engaged	Married
Monica and Luke	Engaged	Engaged
Jessica Grace and Edris	Engaged (Note: The couple left the show early.)	Split
Alex and Jebin	Removed	Split

== Episodes ==
Season	Episodes	Originally released	
Season	Episodes	First released	Last released
1	10	April 6, 2022	April 13, 2022
2	10	August 23, 2023	August 30, 2023
3	10	December 4, 2024	December 18, 2024
4	10	July 15, 2026	July 22, 2026

=== Season 1 (2022) ===
No. overall	No. in season	Title	Original release date
1	1	"The Split"	April 6, 2022
2	2	"The Choice"	April 6, 2022
3	3	"New Bed, New Partner"	April 6, 2022
4	4	"Girls & Guys Night Out"	April 6, 2022
5	5	"Pushing Boundaries"	April 6, 2022
6	6	"The Changeover"	April 6, 2022
7	7	"Back to Reality"	April 6, 2022
8	8	"Time to Answer the Ultimatum"	April 6, 2022
9	9	"Ultimatum Day"	April 13, 2022
Special
10	10	"The Reunion"	April 13, 2022

=== Season 2 (2023) ===
No. overall	No. in season	Title	Original release date
11	1	"The Split"	August 23, 2023
12	2	"Unexpected Revelations"	August 23, 2023
13	3	"The Choice"	August 23, 2023
14	4	"Catching Feelings"	August 23, 2023
15	5	"Are You The One?"	August 23, 2023
16	6	"The Changeover"	August 23, 2023
17	7	"Change of Heart"	August 23, 2023
18	8	"Time to Answer the Ultimatum"	August 23, 2023
19	9	"Ultimatum Day"	August 30, 2023
Special
20	10	"The Reunion"	August 30, 2023

=== Season 3 (2024) ===
No. overall	No. in season	Title	Original release date
21	1	"The Split"	December 4, 2024
22	2	"The Choice"	December 4, 2024
23	3	"Sealed With A Kiss"	December 4, 2024
24	4	"Ghosted"	December 4, 2024
25	5	"Just Here For A Hall Pass?"	December 4, 2024
26	6	"Fortune Favors the Bold"	December 11, 2024
27	7	"The Changeover"	December 11, 2024
28	8	"You're Playing with Fire"	December 11, 2024
29	9	"Ultimatum Day"	December 18, 2024
Special
30	10	"The Reunion"	December 18, 2024

== Production ==
=== Filming ===
Season one of the series was filmed in various locations in Austin, Texas. The first week the contestants spent dating each other was filmed at the Marriott Downtown Hotel in the city, while the rest of the series was filmed at the Aloft Austin Downtown Hotel.

Filming started in May 2021 and lasted for eight weeks with the reunion being filmed later.

Season two of the series was filmed in Charlotte, North Carolina from September 2022 to November 2022.

Season three was filmed in Downtown Phoenix, Arizona.

=== Release ===
A trailer was in the reunion episode of season two of Love Is Blind on March 4, 2022. It was advertised as "the next great social experiment" with the same creator as Love Is Blind.

The first season consisting of eight episodes released to Netflix on April 6, 2022, and later released the final episode along with a reunion special on April 13, a week later.

The second season consisting of eight episodes released to Netflix on August 23, 2023, and later released the final episode along with a reunion special on August 30, a week later.

The fourth season premiered on Netflix on July 15, 2026, featuring six couples, and concluded with a reunion special released on July 22, 2026.

== Reception ==
=== Viewership ===
The first season of the series reached number one on Netflix in television shows in the United States on April 10, 2022.

The Ultimatum season 1 spent four weeks in the Netflix Global Top Ten, with 43,710,000 hours watched during its first week of release, 58,470,000 during week two, 29,010,000 during week three, and 13,140,000 during week four.

With a total of 144,330,000 hours watched within its first four weeks of release, The Ultimatum season 1 ranked second, after Love is Blind, as the most watched ongoing nonscripted series on Netflix in 2022, based on a tally of all hours viewed across all programs while in the Netflix Global Top Ten.

=== Critical response ===
Daniel D'Addario of Variety writes "Love is Blind and The Ultimatum are the new standard-bearers for romantic reality TV." D'Addario states The Ultimatum "inverts Love is Blind's formula to great success...(creator) Coelen's series occupy a more unsettled place, one that uses the tools of reality (big organizing ideas, people attuned to the dramatic) to create stagings that look like our world."

Jenny Singer from Glamour writes "The Ultimatum on Netflix is even better than Love Is Blind. Yes, really." Singer continues "The Ultimatum feels like an actual attempt at partnership—love, sex, intimacy, friendship, caring for each other's dogs. The ending is insane, and so is the beginning, and the middle. That just makes it, oddly, realistic."

Alexandra Whittington at Collider says "The Ultimatum: Marry Or Move On is Netflix's wildest reality series yet...If you like reality dating shows then you are going to love The Ultimatum: Marry Or Move On."

Grant Rindner of GQ stated "critical reception has been mixed." Sarah Manavis of New Statesman was highly critical of the show, writing, "The awfulness of marriage shows is on full display here... The premise is shoddy and unclear, especially in comparison to other dating programmes." Sophia June of Nylon wrote no one from the series should get married based on the premise and "the manipulation techniques". Morgan Smith of Highsnobiety called it the "messiest reality dating show we hate to love" and stated he loved it.

== Spin-offs ==
The first international version of the series was released on Netflix on December 30, 2022 titled The Ultimatum: France. A second international version, based in South Africa, was released on Netflix on 10 May 2024. Salamina Mosese and Tshepo Howza Mosese are the hosts. Ahead of the first-season premiere, Netflix announced a spin-off of the show that would feature an all-queer cast titled The Ultimatum: Queer Love. The spin-off series premiered on May 24, 2023 and featured JoAnna Garcia Swisher as the host. A dating sim mobile game titled The Ultimatum: Choices was released in December 2024. It is free but requires an active Netflix subscription.
