= Brian Hallisay =

American actor

- Born: October 31, 1978 (age 48); Washington, D.C., U.S.
- Education: Cornell University (BA)
- Occupation: Actor
- Years active: 2005–present
- Spouse: Jennifer Love Hewitt (m. 2013)
- Children: 3

Brian Gleidson Hallisay (born October 31, 1978) is an American actor, known for his roles as Will Davis in The CW drama series Privileged and Kyle Parks in the Lifetime drama series The Client List. He starred on the television series Revenge as Ben Hunter.

== Early life ==
Hallisay was born on Halloween Day in Washington, D.C., graduated from Gonzaga College High School in 1996 and then moved on to Cornell University, graduating in 2000. After college and before moving to Los Angeles, he worked on Wall Street. Regarding the career change, he commented: "I was slaving away at that and I had a really good time with it, but it got to the point where I said, 'You know, I had always dreamed about seeing what acting was all about.'"

== Career ==
Hallisay made his television debut in 2005, appearing on Fox's The Inside, with Rachel Nichols and Adam Baldwin, as well as Lifetime's Strong Medicine, opposite Patricia Richardson.

On The CW's drama Privileged, Hallisay played Will Davis, a charming and wealthy Palm Beach bachelor who is delighted to learn that his next-door neighbors have hired a beautiful tutor named Megan Smith (Joanna García). He continued in various television series, such as Without a Trace and Cold Case. Since then, he has landed roles in Bones, Medium, Bionic Woman, and CSI: NY, opposite Gary Sinise.

In 2006, he made his feature debut in Erik MacArthur's Bottoms Up, starring Paris Hilton and Jason Mewes. Hallisay played the boyfriend to Hilton, a socialite who helps Mewes save his failing small-town restaurant. In 2011, Hallisay was cast in the third installment of Hostel where he played the lead character. In 2012, Hallisay appeared in two episodes of The CW's series Ringer, and he signed a deal with Lifetime to appear as Kyle Parks in the drama series The Client List.

From late 2018 to early 2019, Hallisay played a recurring role on 9-1-1 as Doug Kendall alias Jason Bailey, the abusive husband of Maddie Buckley, a character played by his real-life wife, Jennifer Love Hewitt.

== Personal life ==
In March 2012, Hallisay began dating his The Client List co-star Jennifer Love Hewitt. In June 2013, it was announced that Hewitt and Hallisay were engaged and expecting their first child. They married November 20, 2013, before the birth of their first child, a daughter, Autumn James. In June 2015, the couple had a boy, Atticus James. In September 2021, Hewitt and Hallisay welcomed their third child, a son named Aidan James.

== Filmography ==
Film
Year	Title	Role	Notes
2006	Bottoms Up	Hayden Field	Direct-to-DVD
2011	Hostel: Part III	Scott	Direct-to-DVD
2014	Jessabelle	Mark	
2014	American Sniper	Captain Gillespie	

Television
Year	Title	Role	Notes
2005	The Inside	Jake Carrington	Episode: "Aidan"
2005	Strong Medicine	Dr. George Harmon	Episode: "Chief Complaints"
2006	Without a Trace	Alex Stark	Episode: "Win Today"
2006	Cold Case	Jimmy Bruno	Episode: "Forever Blue"
2007	CSI: NY	Emery Gable	Episode: "Heart of Glass"
2007	Bones	Ben Michaelson	Episode: "The Glowing Bones in the Old Stone House"
2007	Bionic Woman	Dr. Mark Stevens	Episode: "Faceoff"
2008	Medium	Sean Covey	Episode: "Lady Killer"
2008–2009	Privileged	Will Davis	Main cast; 17 episodes
2009	Eastwick	Morgan	Episode: "Fleas and Casserole"
2011	Rizzoli & Isles	Chris Dunbar	Episode: "My Own Worst Enemy"
2012	Ringer	FBI Agent Pettibone	2 episodes
2012–2013	The Client List	Kyle Parks	Main Role (season 2); Recurring role (season 1); 22 episodes
2013	Body of Proof	Dr. Jeffrey Dante	Episode: "Lost Souls"
2014	Mistresses	Ben Odell	4 episodes
2014–2015	Revenge	Ben Hunter	Main role (season 4)
2016	Major Crimes	Bo McLaren	Episode: "N.S.F.W."
2016	Code Black	Drew McAdoo	Episode: "Landslide"
2018	NCIS	David Crocker	Episode: "Dark Secrets"
2018–2019, 2023–2024	9-1-1	Doug Kendall / Jason Bailey	Recurring role (Season 2); Guest Role (Season 6-7)
2019	Suits	Craig Cameron	Episode: "Cairo"
2024	The Holiday Junkie	Mason	Television film
