= The Ultimatum: Queer Love =

Dating reality television series

- Genre: Reality
- Created by: Chris Coelen
- Presented by: JoAnna Garcia Swisher
- Country of origin: United States
- Original language: English
- No. of series: 2
- No. of episodes: 20

Production
- Executive producers: Chris Coelen; Eric Detwiler; Sarah Dillistone; Stephanie Boyriven; Kelly Montalvo; Sunny Franklin
- Running time: 36–65 minutes
- Production company: Kinetic Content

Original release
- Network: Netflix
- Release: May 24, 2023 – July 2, 2025

Related
- The Ultimatum: Marry or Move On

The Ultimatum: Queer Love is a dating reality television series created by Chris Coelen and produced by Kinetic Content. The series premiered on Netflix on May 24, 2023, and is hosted by JoAnna Garcia Swisher. The series is a spin-off of The Ultimatum: Marry or Move On. The second season of the series premiered on Netflix on June 25, 2025, with the first 7 episodes available to stream on that date and the final 3 episodes released on July 2, 2025. On October 2, 2025, it was announced that the series had been canceled after two seasons.

== Format ==
The Ultimatum is a self-proclaimed social experiment that wants to see how many couples will get married when presented with ultimatums. The show features couples on the verge of marriage. Each pair has eight weeks to decide whether they want to get married or split forever. Couples will later be split up as they choose new partners from the rest of the group, and then move in with them for three weeks.

== Contestants ==
Season 1
Issuing ultimatum	Age	Partner	Age
Xander Boger	30	Vanessa Papa	30
Lexi Goldberg	25	Raelyn Cheung-Sutton	27
Yoly Rojas	34	Mal Wright	36
Mildred Bustillo	33	Tiff Der	32
Sam Mark	31	Aussie Chau	42

Season 2
Issuing ultimatum	Age	Partner	Age
Britney Thompson	27	AJ Blount	28
Haley Drexler	29	Pilar Dizon	29
Kyle Neal	30	Bridget Matloff	28
Marie Robertson	27	Mel Vitale	27
Dayna Mathews	25	Magan Mourad	27
Ashley Johnson	30	Marita Prodger	25

== Season summary ==
=== Season 1 ===
Trial marriages
Contestants	Result (Note: As of Episode 9, "Ultimatum Day".)
Xander and Yoly	Split
Lexi and Mal	Split
Raelyn and Vanessa	Split
Mildred and Aussie	Split
Sam and Tiff	Split

Overview
Original couple	Result	Status (Note: As of Episode 10, "The Reunion".)
Xander and Vanessa	Split	Split
Lexi and Raelyn	Engaged	Split
Yoly and Mal	Engaged	Split
Mildred and Tiff	Engaged	Split
Sam and Aussie	Engaged	Engaged

=== Season 2 ===
Trial marriages
Contestants	Result
Britney and Marita	Split
Haley and Magan	Split
Kyle and Pilar	Split
Marie and AJ	Split
Dayna and Mel	Split
Ashley and Bridget	Split

Overview
Original couple	Result	Status after Reunion	Status Now (July 2026)
Britney and AJ	Engaged	Engaged	Engaged
Haley and Pilar	Engaged	Engaged	Married
Kyle and Bridget	Engaged	Engaged	Engaged
Marie and Mel	Engaged	Split	Split
Dayna and Magan	Engaged	Engaged	Engaged
Ashley and Marita	Split	Split	Split

== Episodes ==
=== Series overview ===
Season	Episodes	Originally released	
Season	Episodes	First released	Last released
1	10	May 24, 2023	June 7, 2023
2	10	June 25, 2025	July 2, 2025

=== Season 1 (2023) ===
No. overall	No. in season	Title	Original release date
1	1	"The Break Up"	May 24, 2023
2	2	"The Choice"	May 24, 2023
3	3	"Newlyweds"	May 24, 2023
4	4	"Group Nights Out"	May 24, 2023
5	5	"In and Out of Love"	May 31, 2023
6	6	"The Changeover"	May 31, 2023
7	7	"Cocktails and Confrontation"	May 31, 2023
8	8	"Is Love Enough"	May 31, 2023
9	9	"Ultimatum Day"	June 7, 2023
10	10	"The Reunion"	June 7, 2023

=== Season 2 (2025) ===
No. overall	No. in season	Title	Original release date
11	1	"Either You Want to Marry Me or You Don't"	June 25, 2025
12	2	"Love Triangles"	June 25, 2025
13	3	"The Choice"	June 25, 2025
14	4	"Secret Rendezvous"	June 25, 2025
15	5	"Behind Closed Doors"	June 25, 2025
16	6	"The Changeover"	June 25, 2025
17	7	"My Heart Is Shattered"	June 25, 2025
18	8	"Backtrack of the Century"	July 2, 2025
19	9	"Ultimatum Day"	July 2, 2025
20	10	"The Reunion"	July 2, 2025

== Production ==
=== Filming ===
The majority of the season was filmed in San Diego, California between September 2021 and November 2021.

The series announced that JoAnna Garcia Swisher would host the series, instead of Nick and Vanessa Lachey who host The Ultimatum: Marry or Move On.

The reunion special was filmed in January 2023, over a year after original production ended.

=== Release ===
On March 24, 2022, Netflix announced the spin-off ahead of the release of the first season of The Ultimatum: Marry or Move On.

A trailer for the series was released following the fourth season reunion of Love Is Blind.

The series consisting of eight episodes premiered on Netflix on May 24, 2023, with the final episode and a reunion episode being released a week later.

== Reception ==
=== Critical response ===
Lindsay Lee Wallace of Time wrote that the spin-off was a "solid-watch". However, Wallace also expressed disappointment in the series' ability to match reality television standards.
