= List of Reba characters =

This is a list of characters from the TV series Reba, which ran from 2001 to 2007. The main character is Reba Hart, a Texan, played by Reba McEntire, who is Oklahoman. The show's initial premise is that Hart's dentist husband has gotten a dental hygienist pregnant, while their teen daughter has also become pregnant out of wedlock.

== Reba Nell Hart ==
Reba Hart
- Reba character
- First appearance: "Pilot" season 1
- Last appearance: "The Kids Are Alright"
- Portrayed by: Reba McEntire

In-universe information
- Gender: Female
- Occupation: Substitute teacher (1); Dental office receptionist (seasons 2–4); Real estate agent (4–6)
- Family: J.V. McKinney (father); Helen McKinney (mother); Grandma McKinney (grandmother); Grandpa McKinney (grandfather)
- Spouse: Brock Hart (divorced)
- Children: Cheyenne Montgomery; Kyra Hart; Jake Hart
- Relatives: Van Montgomery (son-in-law) Elizabeth Montgomery (granddaughter)
- Religion: Christian
- Nationality: American

Reba is the main protagonist of the series. She is played by Reba McEntire and appears in every episode. A fiery redhead who has a bullying, confrontational, sarcastic personality, Reba tries to take control of every situation, which more often than not makes problems worse before they get better. Nevertheless, she is very warm and loving towards her three children and while initially hostile to Brock and Barbra Jean, she grows to forgive them throughout the series.

It is mentioned that she developed a problem with authority during her childhood when she speaks to Brock's therapist, but had a very loving family growing up. In the first season, she is struggling to save her twenty-year marriage to Brock before she learns in a therapy session he is divorcing her to marry his pregnant girlfriend, Barbra Jean. In the same session, she also learns that her oldest child, 17-year-old Cheyenne, is also pregnant by her boyfriend, Van. She allows Van and Cheyenne to get married and move in with her, while her other children, Kyra and Jake, also stay with her. She initially refuses to be around Barbra Jean unless absolutely necessary and is equally hostile to Brock, though this begins to change after their divorce is finalized, Brock and Barbra Jean marry, and have their son, Henry. A short time later at high school graduation, Cheyenne goes into labor and gives birth to a daughter, Elizabeth, in the hospital.

In the second season, Reba continues to move on from her divorce, even getting a boyfriend for a brief period, selling off her engagement ring, and accepting a job from Brock in his dental office. She later quits this job to work for Brock's arch-rival, Eugene, and helps Van and Cheyenne with parenthood and college plans. Reba also becomes more reflective, after attending an old boyfriend's funeral with Brock, she debates whether or not she made the right choice by marrying him at all. She also drew up a will after a near-death experience. A bombshell is dropped when Kyra, who had become increasingly distant when she spent more time with Brock and Barbra Jean due to all the attention Cheyenne and Van were drawing from Reba, plans to move in with them into their new house just four doors down from Reba's.

In the third season, Reba struggles to move on after Kyra's departure, even trying to permanently avoid Brock and Barbra Jean, before she reconciles with Kyra. However, Kyra's move strained their relationship and is at the forefront of several episodes; Reba even agreed to spy on Kyra at Barbra Jean's insistence. Things move from Kyra to Brock when he tells Reba he intends to sell his dental practice to play pro-golf, a decision that enrages both Reba and Barbra Jean, but one that Brock insists is because he is not happy with his life. Fearing he will have another mid-life crisis, Reba develops empathy for Barbra Jean and opens up to Brock about her feelings after the divorce. Meanwhile, Reba tries to help Cheyenne pick a major, and when she picks dentistry, Reba is initially unsupportive, but agrees to support Cheyenne after she insists she can do it.

In the fourth season, Reba mediates between Brock and Barbra Jean, and while tensions are running high, Barbra Jean kicks Brock out of the house. This allows Reba to develop more empathy for Brock, and in several episodes, she relates how he is going through the same pain she did during their separation. Brock uses this to suggest that she still has romantic feelings for him, which is supported by his therapist. To make things easier for Barbra Jean, Reba finally urges Brock to make a decision between playing pro golf and his dental practice; he chooses the latter to spend more time with Barbra Jean and Henry. Reba, convinced that Brock is finally changing for the better, begins to become more cordial to him. After Van suffers an injury that ends his career as a professional football player, Reba encourages him to find another exciting job. After losing her own job in the dental office for calling her boss "a monkey's butt," she pursues a career in real estate and hires Van as her assistant. Jealous that he is a natural in the business, she insists he do boring work until he is better suited for the more important jobs. When she is inspecting Van's wardrobe, she discovers a bottle of alcohol in the closet-subsequently learning that Cheyenne had become an alcoholic.

In the fifth season, Reba and the rest of the family try to help Cheyenne overcome her addiction and also work out her new partnership with Van. She is shocked to learn that Van no longer believed in God following his injury and demonstrates her more caring side when she asks their church's minister to help Van work out his problems, as well as when she allows a family devastated by Hurricane Katrina to stay with them. When Brock drops a bombshell on Reba that they owed the IRS $75,000 in back taxes, it rekindles her fury at Brock for being irresponsible. Because of the situation, Brock and Barbra Jean are prepared to lose their home, so Reba and Van decide to buy it and rent it out to them. Meanwhile, Reba also suffers health problems, in one episode she gets laser eye surgery because of her poor vision, and she collapses at Van and Cheyenne's second wedding because of high blood pressure.

In the sixth season, it is revealed that Reba is still jealous of Barbra Jean, especially after Barbra Jean successfully lost weight. Reba starts to eat healthier so she will not become "the chubby friend." When Brock suspects Barbra Jean is having an affair with her personal trainer, Reba goes to the gym to spy on her-only to find out that the trainer is homosexual. She also encourages Van to accept a job offer from a more prominent real estate agent, which he reluctantly accepts. She is overjoyed to learn from Van that Cheyenne is pregnant again and helps her with family planning-which unfortunately for Reba includes Van, Cheyenne, and Elizabeth moving into another house. When Reba covers for Brock (who had lied to Barbra Jean when he said he would be out of town), Brock and Barbra Jean decide to file for divorce. Kyra decides to move back in because she wants to spend her last year before college with Reba, but she and Kyra have trouble re-adjusting to each other due to Reba's stricter house rules. After Kyra considers several colleges, she decides to put her education on hold to go on tour with her band, a decision that enrages Reba initially but she later supports. In the series finale, Van and Cheyenne move back into Reba's house after a small fire at their own. Reba helps Brock and Barbra Jean work out their problems and they decide to stay married, Van and Cheyenne move back into their new home, and Reba says she has finally forgiven Barbra Jean for being the other woman in her marriage to Brock. She notes that she is happy being single before the theme song plays at the end of the episode.

== Brock Enroll Hart ==
Brock Hart
- Reba character
- First appearance: "Pilot" serises
- Last appearance: "The Kids Are Alright"
- Created by: Allison M. Gibson
- Portrayed by: Christopher Rich

In-universe information
- Gender: Male
- Occupation: Dentist (1–6); Professional golfer (3–4)
- Family: John D. Hart (father); Elizabeth "Liz" Hart (mother)
- Spouse: Reba Hart (divorced); Barbra Jean Hart
- Children: Cheyenne Montgomery; Kyra Hart; Jake Hart; Henry Hart
- Relatives: Van Montgomery (son-in-law); Elizabeth Montgomery (granddaughter)

Brock is Barbra Jean's husband, Reba's ex-husband, and the father of Cheyenne, Kyra, Jake, and Henry. He is played by Christopher Rich. Brock is a dedicated father but is occasionally self-absorbed and tries to believe he is still a younger man.

At the beginning of the series Brock is separated from Reba because of his affair with Barbra Jean, who was at the time a dental hygienist in his office. In the opening scene of the series, during a therapy session, he announces to Reba that he intends to marry a pregnant Barbra Jean, while he also learns that his eldest child Cheyenne is also pregnant by her boyfriend Van. Brock lived in a condo during his separation but often comes over to Reba's house to talk. In the seventh episode of the first season, Brock learned that his father, who he had never been very close to, had died. Brock and Reba bury his ashes on a golf course. Brock and Barbra Jean marry and while he is camping she goes into labor-Reba goes after him after she realizes she convinced him to go camping as a USC recruiter was coming to meet with Van and she wanted the family to stay in Texas, and Barbra Jean was not supposed to have the baby just yet. While he isn't able to be present for it, Barbra Jean gives birth to their son Henry while they are on the phone together. In the season finale Cheyenne gives birth to Brock's first grandchild, Elizabeth.

In the second season Brock is living a quiet family life with Barbra Jean and Henry and gives Reba a job at his dental office. However, it is revealed he is having a hard time in his relationship with Barbra Jean when she confides in Reba that he is neglecting her. Brock also had a hard time with Reba's moving on since their marriage when she sells her engagement ring and the two attend a funeral for one of Reba's former boyfriends. They begin arguing over domestic issues, such as who will be the one to give their third child Jake his first bike. Brock also gets a vasectomy to prevent another unexpected pregnancy with Barbra Jean, which further strains their relationship. It is revealed that Brock is super competitive when he has a feud with fellow dentist Eugene (who is Reba's employer since she quit her earlier job at Brock's office) and tries to outdo Van on a double date with Cheyenne and Barbra Jean. Brock's mother Liz also appears, where she tells Reba she believes Brock made a mistake in his affair and shows obvious disapproval at Barbra Jean. Brock further infuriates Reba when he supports their second child Kyra's desire to move into Brock and Barbra Jean's new house-which is only four houses down from Reba's.

In the third season Brock shows disapproval at Barbra Jean's mother hen nature over Kyra, but drops a bombshell when he reveals that he intends to sell his dental practice to become a professional golfer. Barbra Jean and Reba are both outraged, but while Barbra Jean is content to let Brock pursue his career, Reba urges him to return to his practice and family. Brock then admits to Reba that he is unhappy with his life and has been taking medication for anti-depressence. Barbra Jean is even more upset at his using "happy pills," but Brock decides to continue on with his medication and pro golf dreams. In the dramatic season finale, Brock tells Reba he believes he made a mistake by marrying Barbra Jean.

In the fourth season tensions between Brock and Barbra Jean are at an all-time high, and Barbra Jean kicks Brock out of the house. Brock moves back into the condo, the same condo he lived in during his separation from Reba. After Kyra encourages him and Barbra Jean to work out their problems, they begin to reconcile. Brock moves back into the house and allows Reba to sell his condo, and Barbra Jean buys a dog she names Broque. Brock believes that Reba still has feelings for him and remarks that his therapist "will have a field day with this!" When his therapist confronts Brock and Reba and asks if they still love each other, neither answers.

In the fifth season, while Cheyenne is battling problems with an alcohol addiction, Brock secretly begins smoking again after he lectures Kyra and Jake not to do it. Brock becomes jealous of Reba's online boyfriend and reveals he still has some feelings for Reba. His problems with Barbra Jean are continued when his brother-in-law Buzzard shows up and calls Brock a "dirtbag." Brock also has more than personal problems-Brock reveals to Reba that they owe the IRS $75,000 in back taxes and could lose his house over it. Reba is initially infuriated, but for Barbra Jean and Henry's sake she and Van agree to buy their home and rent it out to them.

In the sixth season, Brock and Barbra Jean continue to have problems-especially after Barbra Jean loses a great deal of weight and becomes a successful weather reporter for the local news. The two decide to file for divorce after Brock continues to lie and deceive her-in one instance getting his vasectomy reversed so he can get Barbra Jean pregnant again. Brock suffers through the proceedings before in the series finale, Reba helps the two work out their problems, and Brock and Barbra Jean decide to stay married.

== Cheyenne Hart Montgomery ==
Cheyenne Montgomery
- Reba character
- First appearance: "Pilot" season 1
- Last appearance: "The Kids Are Alright"
- Created by: Allison M. Gibson
- Portrayed by: JoAnna Garcia

In-universe information
- Gender: Female
- Occupation: High school student (1); College student (2–6)
- Family: Reba Hart (mother); Brock Hart (father); Barbra Jean Hart (step-mother); Kyra Hart (sister); Jake Hart (brother); Henry Hart (half-brother)
- Spouse: Van Montgomery
- Children: Elizabeth Montgomery (daughter)
- Relatives: Dan Montgomery (father-in-law); Sue Montgomery (mother-in-law)

Cheyenne is Brock and Reba's eldest child, Van's wife, and the mother of Elizabeth and an unborn son. She is played by actress JoAnna Garcia. She is blonde and while intelligent, is often ditzy and silly, especially in earlier seasons. She is also kind and sensitive, and eager to help others.

Through flashbacks in the third season, it was revealed that Cheyenne had encouraged her estranged parents to work things out, but to no avail. She also got pregnant by her boyfriend Van, the football star on the school team, and the two agreed they would raise the baby together. Her pregnancy was revealed during a therapy session her parents were required to attend by Jake. When her parents confront them, they both state it was their first time and they had been virgins prior, so they weren't worried about STDs. They only thought you could get pregnant one day a month. Van proposes after he gets kicked out of his house and Cheyenne happily accepts.. The two married at the end of the series pilot. After a brief honeymoon the two moved into Reba's house and continued high school, though the school principal did not want Cheyenne to continue attending and briefly suspended her because of her pregnancy (though she allowed Van to stay because of his position on the football team). Cheyenne, who had been co-captain of the high school drill team and shallow prior to her pregnancy, began to become more sensitive and humble, though she still was upset that Van was the favorite for the Prom King title and she was not for the Queen. Cheyenne went into labor just before graduation but did not tell anyone until she received her diploma. She gave birth to her daughter Elizabeth later that night in the hospital.

In the second season, she and Van are struggling to raise Elizabeth and continue thinking about college. The baby also takes a toll on their finances, and they briefly apply for food stamps before Reba takes a job at Brock's dental office to cover the expenses. Throughout her own issues, Cheyenne encourages Reba to try speed-dating to find someone special, and encourages Van to reconcile with his parents (who had never supported his marriage and had kicked him out of the house after he told them about his intentions to marry Cheyenne). After a pregnancy scare, Van and Cheyenne move out for a time after Reba accidentally referred to Elizabeth as "a mistake." The two reconcile with Reba and move back in.

In the third season, Kyra, Cheyenne's younger sister who continually makes fun of her, moves out, taking an emotional toll on Reba. In an effort to convince her to move back in, Van and Cheyenne go to Brock and Barbra Jean's new house, where Kyra confronts them about how they had replaced her and Jake as the family in the house, then the two reconcile after both are in tears. Van and Cheyenne also prepare to pick college majors, and while Van is undecided, Cheyenne decides she wants to be a dentist like Brock. Reba does not support her choice because of her inability to commit to activities in the past, but Cheyenne insists she will be able to stick to her decision and pursues the career. She demonstrates her new adult perspective when she is upset that Van bought a car, a 1960s Mustang, without consulting her first. She celebrates her 21st birthday in the midst of a fight between Reba and Barbra Jean.

In the fourth season, Van is traded to Denver, which takes an emotional toll on Cheyenne when she worries that he is enjoying being there without her. She and Elizabeth visit Denver several times until Van suffers a career-ending injury and the two are left with few financial options. Cheyenne is shown to be getting increasingly stressed throughout the season, having a difficult time when Van moves to Denver part time for his career, often out of the house for college, and lying about having a "biology lab" which is really an excuse for her to go sing at a karaoke bar. Van is eventually hired to be Reba's new assistant in the real estate business and things begin to look up. In the season finale Reba discovers a bottle of alcohol in Van and Cheyenne's closet and initially thinks it's Van's, getting him to promise to attend Alcoholics Anonymous. He then confronts Cheyenne and she downplays it, saying she would occasionally drink while studying. When she agrees to go to the AA meeting, she comes home announcing she realizes she is an alcoholic herself. Initially the family thinks she may just be jumping on the bandwagon and exaggerating it, but when Reba catches her pouring a glass of wine because she's having a "bad day," the truth really comes out: She goes to the meetings in the morning but drinks later in the day, has been extremely stressed and afraid for her family's future, and started drinking because it made her feel better at first. It became difficult for her to stop and she would promise herself she would, until the thought she would feel better popped back in her head. Reba is able to get her to put down the glass despite her initially refusing and being reluctant to. The season ends with Reba embracing her, to which Cheyenne responds by crying and saying she's really scared.

In the fifth season, Cheyenne becomes determined to beat her addiction, even trying smoking and Booze-Away pills before she attends a rehab center. Finally sober, she goes on a diet with Reba and Barbra Jean to help the latter overcome her food addiction. She volunteers at a homeless shelter and realizes that she wants to help people and changes her career choice to being a drug and alcohol counselor. In a unique anniversary gift, Van and Cheyenne decide to renew their wedding vows, but due to Cheyenne and Van getting into a fight over Van not inviting her friends from her addiction support group, Reba, stressed and already dealing with high blood pressure, collapses and they have to go to the hospital. While there they have to take a hard look at their relationship, making them realize that while they have had many ups and downs they love each other and end up renewing their vows privately in front of Reba, Brock and Barbra Jean.

In the sixth season, Cheyenne becomes pregnant again. Reba is overjoyed and begins helping her with family planning, but Cheyenne's hormones become insane for a brief period of time. After she is fine again she tells Reba that she, Van, and Elizabeth will need to buy a house to support their growing family, which Reba reluctantly agrees to. The two find out they are having a son, and Cheyenne dodges a promise she made to her father that she would name her son after him. The two buy an English-style house and after a small fire in the home the two move back in with Reba until the series finale, when the two move back into their new home.

== Van Montgomery ==
Van Montgomery
- Reba character
- First appearance: "Pilot" season 1
- Last appearance: "The Kids Are All Right"
- Created by: Allison M. Gibson
- Portrayed by: Steve Howey

In-universe information
- Gender: Male
- Occupation: High school student (1); College student (3); College football player (3); Arena football player (3–4); Real-estate agent (4–6)
- Family: Dan Montgomery (father); Sue Montgomery (mother); Unnamed uncle Aunt Floyd (aunt); Unnamed grandmother Unnamed grandfather Unnamed cousins
- Spouse: Cheyenne Montgomery
- Children: Elizabeth Montgomery (daughter)
- Relatives: Reba Hart (mother-in-law); Brock Hart (father-in-law); Barbra Jean Hart (stepmother-in-law); Kyra Hart (sister-in-law); Jake Hart (brother-in-law); Henry Hart (brother-in-law)

Van is Cheyenne's husband and the son-in-law of Brock and Reba. He is played by actor Steve Howey. He is funny and a bit of a goofball, but he's also a loving and devoted husband and father. He is an only child.

In the first season it is revealed that he impregnated Cheyenne, and when her parents are worried about any possible STDs they both admit they were virgins prior and this was both of their first time. They thought you could only get pregnant one day a month. Van gets kicked out of his house by his parents because of this, and he proposes to Cheyenne. His parents don't approve of Cheyenne and blame her for getting pregnant, and although he attempts to make up with his parents a few times, often at the urge of Reba or Cheyenne, it never works out. Van is the star football player at the high school, and he uses this leverage by refusing to play when the principal tries to expel Cheyenne due to her pregnancy, forcing her to change her mind under pressure from the school. Van gets offered a scholarship to play football at USC, and they are excited about the idea of moving to California, but when Cheyenne experiences labor pains Reba successfully convinces them to go to the University of Houston where they will be close to family. Their daughter Elizabeth is born right after they graduated from high school.

In the second season, Van and Cheyenne start college. He injures his knee soon after they move into on-campus housing and when Cheyenne, Reba and Brock go back to their apartment another couple is living there. They find out that Van suspended his football scholarship because he was nervous and scared to fail, but Cheyenne and Reba are both angry that he made that decision without consulting his wife first. Van takes the semester off and becomes a house dad while Cheyenne continues school. They struggle financially and even apply for food stamps at one point, forcing Reba to take a job at Brock's office to help. Cheyenne again tries to get Van to reconcile with his wealthy parents so they can help with finances, but they shower Elizabeth with extravagant gifts, and it becomes a battle of who can be the better grandparents between them and Reba. Van eventually returns to playing football, making Cheyenne feel lonely as he has less time to spend with her.

In the third season, Van quits college football and joins the Arena League so he can focus more on getting into the NFL. Reba initially disapproves and wants him to finish school, but she eventually accepts his decision. At times Van becomes a little too power happy with his new income, even going as far as buying a sports car without including Cheyenne in the decision. When they decide it's time to get their own apartment, they choose one that's too expensive and try to get Reba to co-sign the lease. When she refuses they forge her signature, but the deal falls through due to her poor credit rating.

In the fourth season, Van hires a sports agent to help negotiate his contract. He gets traded to Denver, infuriating everyone, especially Cheyenne. Cheyenne becomes lonely with Van gone most of the time and is upset to learn he enjoys his time there even without her, especially since it means getting away from her family events when they are together. Van comes home with a broken tailbone, but the X-rays also reveal that he has spinal stenosis, which ends his football career. He receives a $100,000 buyout check from his team and spends it recklessly on gifts. Bored and not knowing what to do with himself, he finds other stuff to do like managing Kyra's band, playing online poker and attempting to train Jake in football. Reba eventually hires him to be her real estate assistant, and he turns out to be a natural. While inspecting his wardrobe, Reba discovers an empty bottle in the closet and suspects Van has become a drinker. She encourages him to go to Alcoholics Anonymous, but he forces Cheyenne to tell the truth that the bottle was actually hers.

In the fifth season, Van admits he lost his faith in God when his football career ended. Reba tries to take him to see the Reverend, but he says Van can only be helped when he wants it. Reba and Van also spat at work a lot and are forced to see an occupational therapist. When it is revealed that Brock owes $75,000 in back taxes, Van and Reba agree to buy his house and rent it out to him and Barbra Jean. With their 5th anniversary coming up, Van and Cheyenne decide to renew their vows but get into an argument at the ceremony. It is cut short when Reba collapses due to high blood pressure and is rushed to the hospital.

In the sixth season, a big real estate company offers Van a prominent position but leaves out Reba. He declines the position out of loyalty to her, but she eventually encourages him to take the job for his family's sake. Cheyenne becomes pregnant with a son, so they decide it's time to buy their first house together. They have several disagreements on how to decorate the house and whether or not Van should be trying to fix things. They are forced to temporarily move back in with Reba when a small fire is caused by Van's failed attempt to fix the heater.

== Kyra Eleanore Hart ==
Kyra Hart
- Reba character
- First appearance: Pilot season 1
- Last appearance: The Kids Are Alright
- Created by: Allison M. Gibson
- Portrayed by: Scarlett Pomers

In-universe information
- Gender: Female
- Occupation: Middle school student (1–2); High school student (3–6)
- Family: Reba McKinney Hart (mother); Brock Hart (father); Barbra Jean Booker Hart (stepmother); Cheyenne Hart Montgomery (sister); Jake Hart (brother); Henry Hart (half-brother)
- Relatives: Van Montgomery (brother-in-law); Elizabeth Montgomery (niece)

The middle child, Kyra has the fewest emotional issues of the family, but everyone admits that she has a dark and morbid side. Many of her traits and looks come from Reba, most notably her strong use of sarcasm, although she's known to be more manipulative and difficult. She and Cheyenne have many up and downs in their relationship at the start of the show but they end up patching things up in the last season when Cheyenne realizes she was mean and selfish toward Kyra for much of their lives. She initially picks on Jake a lot but their relationship also matures by the end, especially when he asks Kyra to be his soccer team coach when everyone realizes Van is too obnoxious as a coach and takes the game too seriously.

In the first season she doesn't have many storylines, but it's made clear she is a straight-A student who plays in the school band. She is angry at her dad Brock for leaving her mom and initially doesn't like Barbra Jean, making the same sarcastic remarks toward her that Reba does which gets her in trouble. She is the first person to realize that Cheyenne is in labor before her graduation but covers for her since she's determined to walk for it.

In season 2 her more devious side comes out: She lies to Reba about Barbra Jean giving Jake fast food (which turns out to be the truth even though she didn't realize it). She gets her first boyfriend, but lies that he broke up with her because he didn't like that Reba and his dad had romantic feelings for each other, when in reality she broke up with him because he was a crybaby. It becomes more and more obvious during the season that Kyra feels like Reba is more concerned about everyone else in her life and that Cheyenne and her problems always come first. This culminates in Kyra moving in with Brock and Barbra Jean when she has to give up a summer study program in England because Reba has to spend the money that would have gone towards her trip on Cheyenne, who must take summer school in order to remain a full-time student.

In the third season, when Kyra starts cancelling her mother-daughter dates with Reba, Reba suspects that Kyra is taking advantage of Barbra Jean and Brock's separation and having her run of the house with no rules, so she asks Kyra to move back home. However, it is revealed that Barbra Jean is just acting and is actually very lonely, and Kyra has actually been helping her cope with the separation and get out of the house to do things with her and Henry, even though it does bother her that Barbra Jean has started dressing like her. Shetells Reba she wants to stay there because Barbra Jean needs her. Reba is proud of Kyra and her caring nature and agrees she should stay there, but she needs to keep her updated on what's going on and let her know if she needs help.

In the fourth season Kyra continues to grow up, seemingly too fast. Barbra Jean and Reba often have disagreements over how to handle her relationships, especially when she dates an older boy. He later breaks up with her when she refuses to sleep with him, breaking her heart. She gets her driver's license and starts a band, which is managed by Van.

For the first four seasons of the show, a recurring theme of Kyra's storylines was her social life being unreasonably micromanage (and sometimes blatantly sabotaged) because her parents, including Barbra Jean, live in mortal fear that she will meet a boy and suffer the same fate as Cheyenne, despite her being the most intelligent of the children (probably even smarter than Brock). With Kyra, this quickly becomes a source of anger if not outright hatred for Reba, Brock and B.J., because in her eyes, Cheyenne has been rewarded with a husband and child for her irresponsibility, while Kyra is being punished for it.

Kyra is absent for most of the fifth season due to Scarlett Pomers' real-life battle with anorexia nervosa. When she returns for the sixth season, Reba simply asks, "Where have you been?," to which she replies, "I was getting something to eat."

In the sixth season, she decides to move back in with Reba so she can spend her final year before college with her mother. Kyra becomes upset when Reba puts her foot down and sets stricter rules than Brock and Barbra Jean had (i.e. not being allowed to drink alcohol at the house, not allowing a male member of her band to come over late at night to work on songs), but she ends up respecting her mother for them and their relationship continues to improve. Cheyenne also discovers that their strained relationship was started when she ruined Kyra's fifth birthday party by slamming one of her gifts into her cake out of jealousy. She apologizes to Kyra, and they attempt to improve their relationship. Kyra decides not to go to college and focus on her music, which initially threatens her relationship with the rest of the family, but Reba ends up understanding and they make up.

== Jake Mitchell Hart ==
Jacob Mitchell Hart
- Reba character
- First appearance: Pilot
- Last appearance: The Kids are Alright
- Created by: Allison M. Gibson
- Portrayed by: Mitch Holleman

In-universe information
- Gender: Male
- Family: Reba McKinney Hart (mother); Brock Hart (father); Barbra Jean Booker (stepmother); Cheyenne Hart Montgomery (sister); Kyra Hart (sister); Henry Hart (half-brother)
- Relatives: Van Montgomery (brother-in-law); Elizabeth Montgomery (niece); Unborn nephew
- Religion: Christian

The youngest of the Hart children, Jake is often teased by his sister Kyra. Jake is pretty oblivious of what goes around behind him. He acts like a normal boy for his age. Brock and Van try to teach him sports, but he is not very good, much to their chagrin.

Despite living with the main family, he doesn't have many of his own storylines throughout the show, though he occasionally plays large roles in episodes. In the first season he has a best friend that has a mother who is uncomfortable with everything going on at his house and prefers him to play with her son at her house. Later, he's shown to have a devious side as well when he plays an elaborate Halloween joke on Reba, who greatly appreciates and applauds it, passing on the torch to him. He also has an episode arc where he makes the basketball team, but Van stalks him and finds out he's on a wheelchair basketball team and is, for some reason, much better at sports in a wheelchair; he proceeds to be found out by everyone, including his coach, despite Van trying to cover for him. He ends the series as a young teenager who has done a lot of growing up.

== Barbra Jean Booker Hart ==
Barbra Jean Booker-Hart
- Reba character
- First appearance: Pilot
- Last appearance: The Kids Are Alright
- Created by: Allison M. Gibson
- Portrayed by: Melissa Peterman

In-universe information
- Nickname: B. J.
- Gender: Female
- Occupation: Dental hygienist/office manager (1–2); Insurance saleswoman (5); Timeshare saleswoman (5); Intestinal cleanser saleswoman (5); Weather girl (6)
- Family: Big Daddy (father); Big Momma (mother); Saliva (aunt); Buzzard (brother); Brother who flips houses (brother); Brother who flipped his pick-up (brother); Katie Ann (sister); Laune (sister); Trent (brother-in-law); Lorri Ann (sister); Unnamed grandfather
- Spouse: Brock Hart
- Children: Henry Hart
- Religion: Christianity

Barbra Jean, nicknamed "BJ", was Brock's dental hygienist and had an affair with him as his marriage to Reba was deteriorating. The result was her getting pregnant, and marrying him after he divorced Reba. Barbra Jean is even more of a goofball than Van, and is often an easy target for Reba's sarcasm. While noisy and annoying, Barbra Jean is a kind-hearted person with good intentions.

Her tendency to tell "over-the-top" stories results in her sharing many random and often bizarre facts about her childhood and past. The most that can be understood is that she was born in Friendly, Texas, and at one point during her infancy was "the biggest baby in Juno County." She has an older sister, currently married, a brother named "Buzzard", and a father ("Big Daddy") who enjoys drinking and hunting. Brock is afraid of both "Buzzard" and "Big Daddy" because he knows they don't like him. She also claims to have an Aunt "Saliva" who spits professionally. She loves bedazzling her clothing (often noticeable), and claims that due to her wearing a bedazzled pair of pants in a lightning storm and getting hit, she now has a "butt-rometer" that tells the weather. She also has a large collection of Beanie Babies, is in charge of a Beanie Baby club, and has back stories on their relationships to each other, which Brock is embarrassed to admit he really wants to know about (and when he finds out one he says "It's so sad!" through tears).

In the last season, she loses a large amount of weight and becomes a weather girl for a local station (she told people she was Stormy Clearweather). In the last episode, she gets a job at the TV station as a news girl (she called her segment "Babs Janson: Street Walker.")

Throughout the series, she and Brock have many ups and downs in their relationship, separating twice and almost divorcing in the last season before reconciling and deciding to remain married. They are known to keep secrets from each other and Barbra Jean is often worried he will have another affair and leave her. In a funny nod to the fact that her son Henry is rarely seen, she gets asked often, "Where's Henry?" To which she responds, "Crap!" and runs out of the house.

In a few episodes in season 4 she has a Yorkie named "Broque." Following an episode where she goes "missing" and is later found to have killed and eaten a hawk, she disappears.

Barbra Jean is convinced throughout the series that she and Reba are best friends, despite Reba early on clearly feeling angry and bitter towards her for being "the other woman." However, throughout the series, Reba becomes more sympathetic toward her and starts to be shown to truly care for her and her feelings. In the last episode, Reba admits that Barbra Jean is her best friend, making her absolutely elated.

== Lori Ann Garner ==
Lori Ann Garner
- Reba character
- First appearance: "Every Picture Tells a Story"
- Last appearance: "Switch"
- Created by: Allison M. Gibson
- Portrayed by: Park Overall

In-universe information
- Gender: Female

Reba's best friend. Introduced in season one in the episode "Every Picture Tells A Story." Lori Ann was married and divorced three times, presumably because all three husbands cheated on her. Lori Ann was Reba's confidant on her problems with Brock and Barbra Jean and even Cheyenne. During Lori Ann's guest appearances on the series, she is always cruel and evil to Brock, (who is just as cruel and evil back to her), as well as Barbra Jean (who seems to like Lori Ann). One can assume this is because of what Brock and Barbra Jean did to Reba, along with her own personal feelings for Brock, as it's revealed that Lori Ann and Brock once dated before his marriage to Reba. A big part of Lori Ann's character is that she is always looking for a man. In the episode "Every Picture Tells A Story," when Lori Ann says "men are pigs," Brock retorts with: "Well you must love bacon cause you keep marrying us." Even Reba herself describes Lori Ann as "a desperate, desperate woman" upon hearing that Lori Ann told a priest during confession that "he had nice eyes." In total, Lori Ann only made six appearances in the first season, and one in the second season. Her last episode was "Switch"; after that she was never seen again, but she was referred to in the fourth-season episode "Van's Agent," where it was mentioned Lori Ann was going to Jamaica with a man who left the priesthood for her. She was never seen or mentioned again after that episode, or in any of the final two seasons of the show.

== See also ==
- Reba (TV series)
