= Forever Blue (Cold Case) =

- Cold Case episode
- Episode no.: Season 4 Episode 10
- Directed by: Jeannot Szwarc
- Written by: Tom Pettit
- Original air date: December 3, 2006

Guest appearances
- Shane Johnson (Sean "Coop" Cooper (1968)); Brian Hallisay (Jimmy Bruno (1968)); Chad Everett (Jimmy Bruno (2006)); Kristi Clainos (Eileen Bruno (1968)); Toni Sawyer (Eileen Bruno (2006)); Conor O'Farrell (Brogan Cooper (1968)); Nicolas Coster (Brogan Cooper (2006)); Charles Mesure (Tom McCree (1968)); William Lucking (Tom McCree (2006)); Rob Swanson (Owen Murphy (1968)); Leon Russom (Owen Murphy (2006)); Christian Keiber (Teddy Burke (1968)); Hans Howes (Leon Krol); Dennis Mooney (Priest); Oren Williams (Andre Halstead); Sonja Sohn (Toni Jameson)

"Forever Blue" is the tenth episode of the fourth season of the American police procedural television series Cold Case, and the 79th episode overall. Written by Tom Pettit and directed by Jeannot Szwarc, the episode originally aired on CBS on December 3, 2006. In this episode, the team re-investigates the 1968 death of a policeman who was shot in his patrol car. The case was then ruled as a drug bust gone bad, but new evidence reveals that there is more than meets the eye.

== Plot ==
In the 1960s, Jimmy and Eileen Bruno's son is to be baptized, but Jimmy's partner in the police force, Sean 'Coop' Cooper, arrives late. He apologizes to Eileen, but she is cold. In the next scene, Coop is dead in his patrol car.

In the present, a convict hoping to benefit from his tip tells Lily Rush and John Stillman what he saw as the first on the scene. He claims that Coop was 'dirty' and associated with Teddy Burke, a drug dealer. Coop's father, Brogan Cooper, arrives and speaks with John, whom he knows from the force, to defend Coop's name. Meanwhile, Kat Miller and Will Jeffries visit Owen Murphy, an old colleague of Coop, who insists that Coop could never have been in cahoots with Teddy Burke.

The team then speaks to is Jimmy Bruno, who reveals that their superior Tom McCree was the one who was really corrupt. Tom handled the dispatches in the precinct, and with the ability to set Coop up and a reason to do so, becomes a prime suspect. John and Will find Tom, who admits to accepting bribes from Burke on grounds that it was more sensible to just 'tax' the drug dealer to take care of his men. However, he denies dispatching Coop on the day he was murdered, claiming that it was probably Coop's womanizing that got him killed, citing Coop's affair with Eileen Bruno as an example. In a flashback, Coop and Eileen are seen arguing over an affair, but something is not as it seems.

Lily and Scotty Valens immediately pay a visit to Eileen. A flashback reveals a pregnant Eileen listening to Jimmy and Coop as they drink. Coop is giving Jimmy a dressing down for accepting dirty money. Their argument devolves into a brawl after Jimmy taunts Coop about his actions in Vietnam. Coop suddenly grabs Jimmy and gives him a deep and frustrated kiss. Jimmy pushes him away at first, but after a few moments, they share a passionate kiss. Eileen sees the entire exchange and holds her stomach in shock and sadness. Lily and Scotty realize that Coop was likely killed in a hate crime and by a cop.

Jimmy uncomfortably denies that anything was between him and Coop. However, he recounts an incident in the locker room where Coop outed himself in a fit of rage after Owen Murphy made homophobic remarks. When Lily and Will interrogate Murphy later, he insists he would never kill another member of the force. Instead, he tells them that he told 'Sarge', Coop's father Brogan, that he expected him to "sort (Coop) out". Kat uncovers dispatch records on the night of Coop's death - the person who sent Coop to his death his own father.

Scotty and Vera approach Brogan and tell him they know about the relationship between the two cops, but Brogan denies it, as well as lying about the dispatch. Vera reveals the dispatch slip and Brogan is forced to admit that he set Coop up with help from Tom McCree to try to put some sense into his son. As Scotty and Vera leave, a broken Brogan tells the two men that he no longer cared who Coop was, and that he just wanted him back.

Knowing that Tom McCree was lying the first time he was approached, John interrogates the retired lieutenant, concluding that those he sent to scare Coop ended up shooting him. Tom insists that he had no undisciplined cops but John pushes the point. Annoyed, Tom is unable to hide his anger and admits that he shot Coop. In another room, Jimmy tells Lily that the only reason he wasn't with Coop that night was because he was afraid the world would know who he was. With that, the case is solved and both Brogan Cooper and Tom McCree are put to justice.

The concluding flashback shows Jimmy telling Coop "I ain't a queer", Tom ambushing Coop with a shotgun, and a final conversation between the two cops over the radio. The last scene shows the old Jimmy walking into a familiar lot with a young Coop waiting beside a police car, the past and present juxtaposed. The camera then cuts to Coop and a young Jimmy who holds his partner's hand, and the two are then shown in color against a black & white background and they slowly fade away.

Nick Vera has a side storyline in this episode providing comic relief. It involves a single black mother, nurse Toni Jameson, and her son Andre Halstead. Vera steals Andre's basketball as the teenager annoys Vera by playing right outside his window. Jameson personally goes down to Vera's department to demand the ball back, and they end up quarrelling. Later, Vera arrives on Jameson's doorstep with a new basketball and apologizes to her. Jameson then gets Andre to receive the basketball personally and ends up apologizing back to Vera instead for her son's rudeness and sarcasm. At the end of the episode, the two of them are seen carrying groceries back to their apartment together with a surprised Andre appearing before them, making Vera very awkward.

== Reception ==
First aired on December 3, 2006, the episode was first praised by the AfterElton.com blog The Best Gay Day Ever for its gay sensibilities (see below). According to a Shane Johnson interview done by the same site, this particular episode was also highly praised by the cast itself. As he shares, "even the regular cast on the show commented on how great they felt the episode was."

The gay-themed website Good As You said they had never received more e-mails and instant messages than they did in response to the episode.
