= Kristina Apgar =

American actress

Kristina Mevs-Apgar
- Born: Kristina Apgar
- Occupation: Actress

Kristina Mevs-Apgar (formerly Kristina Apgar) is an American actress best known for her portrayal of Lily Smith on the CW's drama Privileged.

== Career ==
In her teen years, Kristina was a model with the Wilhelmina Models Agency. Clients included Delia's, Clean and Clear, American Eagle Outfitters, Coca-Cola and Abercrombie and Fitch.

Her first television appearance was on the daytime soap As the World Turns. She guest starred on Rescue Me and Law & Order: Criminal Intent. She played Cheri Westin on Terminator: The Sarah Connor Chronicles. From 2008–09, Kristina was a series regular on The CW's drama Privileged, playing Lily Smith, Megan Smith's estranged sister (played by Joanna Garcia).

Kristina recurred on Detroit 187 on ABC playing Riley Sullivan, Detective Stone's (D.J. Cotrona) troubled ex-girlfriend. She was a lead guest star on CSI: Miami with David Caruso playing Monica Dow/Alexis Taymor, a girl who suffered from multiple personality disorder. She then guest starred on It's Always Sunny in Philadelphia episode The Gang Goes to the Jersey Shore. Kristina went on to appear on the CW's 90210 as Jane, a new love interest for Liam Court (Matt Lanter) and guest starred on The Mentalist on CBS.

== Personal life ==
Kristina was a Regional Field Organizer for Organizing for America, President Barack Obama's grassroots re-election team during the 2012 presidential election. She was an Executive Producer of the podcast Sunstorm, hosted by Ai-jen Poo and Alicia Garza.

Kristina graduated with Latin Honors, magna cum laude, from UCLA with a B.A. in Political Science in 2012.
