= Salamina Mosese =

South African actress and television personality

- Born: Salamina Mphelo; 19 June 1983 (age 43); Zebediela, South Africa
- Education: University of Johannesburg; Regenesys Business School
- Occupations: Actress, Producer, Announcer, Television personality
- Years active: 1989–present
- Height: 1.62 m (5 ft 4 in)
- Spouse: Tshepo Howza Mosese (m. 2008)
- Children: 2

Salamina Mphelo Mosese (born 19 June 1983) is a South African actress, producer, announcer and television personality. She is best known for the role "Nthabiseng Masilo" in the television serial 7de Laan.

== Personal life ==
Mosese was born on 19 June 1983 in village Zebediela, Limpopo, South Africa. She received a Matric Exemption with distinctions in English, Afrikaans and History. She completed her Bachelor of Arts degree in Corporate Communications from the University of Johannesburg (RAU). Then she completed her Post Graduate Diploma in Business Management from Regenesys Business School.

She is married to fellow South African actor Tshepo Howza Mosese since 2008 and the couple have two children: Tumelo. He met Tshepo during the television serial Backstage. The duo later won the "Inspirational Couple of the year Award" at the I Do Awards.

In 2020, she expressed that, she is suffering from depression following several challenges in her personal and drama life.

== Career ==
She started career as a presenter for an eTV kids program called CRAZe. She continued to present the program for 5 years. In 1994, she made a cameo appearance in the television serial Soul City. At this time, she also joined with the SABC1 youth show Soul Buddyz from 1999-2002. In April 2006, she took over the role of drama lecturer "Keketso Chaka" from Katlego Danke on the e.tv soapie Backstage, and played te role until June 2007. In 2007, she presented the program Crazy Games on SABC2 and later in the reality show Top Class on SABC1. Meanwhile in 2008, she won and later presented the Top Billing presenter search. After that, she became the presenter of two Nedbank game shows on SABC3 and eTV.

After that, she appeared in many television serials such as Justice for All, Erfsondes on SABC 2 and BBC Drama series, Wild at Heart. As a television host, she presented the "Gospel star" search competition. Then in 2012 she joined with SABC 1 sitcom, "Abo Mzala" and made her first comical role. Then in 2013, she acted in the serial Ella by playing the role as "domestic worker". She later won the SAFTA Golden Horn Award for 'Best Actress in a comedy' for this role. In 2016, she joined the cast of popular soap opera 7de laan on SABC 2, and played the role as journalist, "Nthabiseng Masilo". In the meantime, she hosted the parenting show "Yummy Mammi" on AzaTV. In 2024, she hosted the South African spin off of The Ultimatum: Marry or Move On, alongside husband Tshepo Howza Mosese.

Apart from acting, she worked in the corporate sector as the in-charge of stakeholder relations at the South African Council for Educators (SACE). She is the co founder of the online platform known as "AzaTV" which was launched in May 2015. Apart from that, she is also the co-managing director of "Sorele Media", a media content company formed with her friend, Stephina Zwane. Through the company, she produced the feature film Love and Kwaito. The film received critics acclaim and also selected for the Johannesburg Film Festival.

== Filmography ==
Year	Film	Role	Genre	Ref.
1994	Soul City	Zandi (cameo)	TV series	
2003	Beat the Drum	Street Girl #1	Film	
2010	Wild at Heart	Chloe	TV series	
2012	Erfsondes	Miss Z	TV series	
2014	Abo Mzala	Ella	TV series	
2016	Love and Kwaito	executive producer	Film	
2016	7de Laan	Nthabiseng Masilo	TV series	
2018	Baby Mamas	Toli, co-producer	Film	
2024	The Ultimatum South Africa	Host	TV series	
