= Bottoms Up (2006 film) =

- Theatrical poster for Bottoms Up.
- Directed by: Erik MacArthur
- Written by: Nick Ballo; Erik MacArthur
- Produced by: Brandon Birtell; Freddy Braidy; Francesco Juilland; Nick N. Raslan
- Starring: Paris Hilton; Jason Mewes; Brian Hallisay
- Cinematography: Massimo Zeri
- Edited by: Sherwood Jones
- Distributed by: Sony Pictures
- Release date: September 12, 2006
- Running time: 85 minutes
- Country: United States
- Language: English

Bottoms Up is a 2006 American romantic comedy film starring Jason Mewes and Paris Hilton. The film was directed by Erik MacArthur who is also one of the co-authors of the screenplay.

== Plot ==
Owen Peadman is a Minnesota bartender who arrives in Los Angeles to try to help his father raise money to save his small restaurant. Owen moves in with his gay uncle, Earl, and tries to integrate himself into the high society of Hollywood, where he has a chance run-in with a wealthy socialite named Lisa Mancini and her uptight actor boyfriend Hayden Field. Owen, using a little influence and blackmail, gets a taste of the scandalous lifestyles of the Hollywood upper crust while dealing with his growing romantic feelings for Lisa.

== Cast ==
- Jason Mewes as Owen Peadman
- David Keith as Uncle Earl Peadman
- Paris Hilton as Lisa Mancini
- Brian Hallisay as Hayden Field
- Jon Abrahams as Jimmy DeSnappio
- Phil Morris as Pip Wingo
- Nicholle Tom as Penny Dhue
- Raymond O'Connor as Frank Peadman
- Desmond Harrington as Rusty #1
- Kevin Smith as Rusty #2
- Nic Nac as Nick
- Lindsay Gareth as Dorothy
- Tim Thomerson as A.J. Mancini
- Dominic Daniel as Boots
- Benjamin Anderson as Erik
- Johnny Messner as Limo Driver

== Release ==
The film was released straight-to-DVD on September 12, 2006.
