= The Client List (TV series) =

Lifetime American television drama series

- Created by: Suzanne Martin
- Developed by: Jordan Budde
- Starring: Jennifer Love Hewitt; Cybill Shepherd; Loretta Devine; Colin Egglesfield; Rebecca Field; Naturi Naughton; Alicia Lagano; Kathleen York; Brian Hallisay; Laura-Leigh
- Composers: Pieter A. Schlosser; David Baerwald; Evan Frankfort; Marc Dauer; Liz Phair
- Country of origin: United States
- Original language: English
- No. of seasons: 2
- No. of episodes: 25

Production
- Executive producers: Jennifer Love Hewitt; Dannielle Thomas; Howard Braunstein; Michael Jaffe; AJ Rinella; Jordan Budde; John Tinker; John Strauss; Ed Decter; Efrem Seeger; Michael Reisz; Dannielle Thomas
- Producer: Barbara Nance
- Cinematography: James Chressanthis; Nancy Schreiber
- Editors: David Crabtree; Geoffrey Rowland; Kaja Fehr; Regis Kimble; Pattye Rogers
- Running time: 41–43 minutes
- Production companies: Fedora Films; Jaffe-Braunstein Entertainment; Sony Pictures Television; ITV Studios America

Original release
- Network: Lifetime
- Release: April 8, 2012 – June 16, 2013

The Client List is an American drama television series based on the 2010 television film of the same name, which aired on the Lifetime network. The series stars Jennifer Love Hewitt, who starred in the film, though she plays a different character, in a premise that is slightly different from the film. The series premiered on Sunday, April 8, 2012.

Lifetime ordered an initial 10 episodes for the first season, and on May 7, 2012, the network renewed the series for a second season of 15 episodes to air March 10, 2013. On November 1, 2013, Lifetime cancelled the series, after two seasons.

== Premise ==
The series follows Riley Parks (née Campbell) (Jennifer Love Hewitt), whose husband, Kyle Parks (Brian Hallisay), abandons her and their children, leaving her in financial debt. She comes close to losing their house to foreclosure. Riley accepts work at a day spa in the city of Sugar Land, Texas, which is an hour away from her home in Beaumont, Texas, but refuses when she learns that for some clients, masseuses provide more than massages, known as "extras." When the bank threatens to take her home and the bills start piling up, Riley agrees to start seeing clients on the list.

One day, Riley's best friend, Lacey Locklin (Rebecca Field), is at Riley's house watching Riley's children, Travis (Tyler Champagne) and Katie (Cassidy Guetersloh). When looking for a snack in the freezer, Lacey finds a canister with cash in it. When Lacey confronts Riley about it, Riley lies and says it was an inheritance from Kyle's uncle who had died. When Lacey mentions it to Evan, Kyle's brother, Evan says they didn't have an uncle.

The next afternoon, Lacey goes to The Rub. Thinking they are under surveillance, Georgia Cummings (Loretta Devine), the owner of The Rub, brings Riley and a couple of the girls into the office where they see a blue car in the parking lot. When Riley realizes whose car it is, she goes outside and gets in the passenger seat. Lacey confronts Riley about the money. When Riley admits what really happens at The Rub, Lacey is sick to her stomach and has difficulty believing Riley, but she agrees to keep her secret.

As Riley deals with her children, her mother, her feelings for her brother-in-law, her friends, the girls at the spa, and various men who want to romance her, Riley tries to keep her work in erotic limbo a secret.

== Cast and characters ==
=== Main cast ===
- Jennifer Love Hewitt as Riley Parks (née Campbell), the main character whose husband leaves her during a financial crisis when they risk losing their house to foreclosure. Riley is hired at The Rub as a massage therapist and soon realizes the only way to make enough money to catch up financially is to give "extras" to some of the clients. Although hesitant at first, she soon accepts this as a way to save their house and provide for her family. She has a supportive brother-in-law, Evan, who is always looking after her children when she is out and is a close friend to her. Riley and Evan soon develop a relationship, which upsets Riley's husband, Kyle, when he returns later in the series. Riley's best friend Lacey tells her that Kyle planned on leaving her after Lacey finds out the truth about the job's extra services.
- Cybill Shepherd as Lynette Montgomery, Riley's mother who works at a hair salon and has been married many times. She tries to look out for Riley's and her grandchildren's best interests.
- Loretta Devine as Georgia Cummings-Clemens, the former owner of the massage parlor, The Rub, in Sugar Land.
- Colin Egglesfield as Evan Parks, Riley's brother-in-law, her husband Kyle's brother, who also harbors secret feelings for her.
- Rebecca Field as Lacey Jean Locklin, Riley's best friend since childhood who has discovered the truth about what Riley and most of the other massage therapists do and wants her to quit.
- Alicia Lagano as Selena Ramos, a masseuse at the parlor, who often offers "extra services" to her clients. Selena also recommended the masseuse job to Riley. She is shown to be jealous of Riley's relationship with Georgia, who gives her extra responsibilities at the shop, and later becomes her boss. She and Evan had a brief romance, but it did not last.
- Brian Hallisay as Kyle Parks (recurring role, season 1; main role, season 2), Riley's husband and Evan's brother, who ran away from his family. He is arrested for stealing copper wire and wants Riley back. She hires a defense attorney for him solely because he is the father of her children.
- Naturi Naughton as Kendra (season 1), a hard-working masseuse at the parlor. Kendra quit The Rub along with Jolene in the beginning of the second season.
- Kathleen York as Jolene (season 1), another masseuse working at the parlor, who does not give "extras". She only gives "straight" massages. Jolene quit The Rub along with Kendra in the beginning of the second season.
- Laura-Leigh as Nikki Shannon (season 2), the newly hired masseuse at The Rub.

=== Recurring cast ===
- Tyler Champagne as Travis Parks, Kyle and Riley's son
- Cassidy Guetersloh as Katie Parks, Kyle and Riley's daughter
- Greg Grunberg as Dale Locklin, Lacey's husband
- Elisabeth Röhm as Taylor Berkhalter, a woman who continually competes with Riley and ends up buying the hair salon where Lynette and Lacey both work.
- Bart Johnson as Beau Berkhalter, Taylor's husband, who later cheated on her.
- Rob Mayes as Derek Malloy (season 2), a masseur working at the parlor, who has sexual relations with Selena.
- T.V. Carpio as Shelby Prince (season 2), a fellow police officer who met Evan at the police academy, later becoming his girlfriend.
- Michael Beach as Harold Clemens (season 2), Georgia's boyfriend and later husband.
- Brian Howe as Judge Overton (season 2), one of the names on the client list, working on the inside with Riley.
- Marco Sanchez as Graham Sandoval (season 2), Kyle's attorney.
- Johnathon Schaech as Greg Carlyle (season 2), a strip club owner that Nikki used to work for, before becoming a masseuse.
- Tammy Townsend as Karina Lake (season 2)
- Sunny Mabrey as Lisa Munsey (season 2)
- Michelle Faraone as Michelle (season 2)
- McKinley Freeman as Client 1 (season 1)
- Desi Lydic as Dee Ann (season 1), a masseuse working at the parlor.
- Brian Kerwin as Garrett (season 1), Lynette's ex-boyfriend, whom Lynette almost considered marrying.
- Jon Prescott as Dr. Mark Flemming (season 1), a single-father widower who asked Riley on a date.

== Production ==
=== Development ===
The show is based around Lifetime's 2010 television film of the same name, with Jennifer Love Hewitt reprising the lead role. The series, however, is a re-imagining of the film and is not a direct continuation of the film's storyline. The most notable change is that the husband of Hewitt's character abandons his family in the television series before she becomes involved in prostitution, whereas in the film he leaves with their children after the scandal is exposed.

The pilot was written by Jordan Budde, and the film's producers all executive-produced the series alongside Hewitt. Budde got the job because Suzanne Martin, who wrote the film, was busy working on Hot in Cleveland at the time. Upon being given the assignment Budde watched the original movie and felt that the story had ended and also that it was "super depressing" instead he decided to reimagine the show and pitched it that way to Lifetime who accepted. At one point the network toyed with the idea of calling the show "The Rub" and have no connection to the original movie although they eventually decided against this.

Early on Hewitt was involved in the casting of her masseuse clients, although as the show went on she dialed back her involvement in this. This, in part, led to complaints that "the guys were all so good looking". Later the team tried to cast "more real guys" although by this point the network refused, insisting on "hot guys".

Three promotional materials were filmed in October 2011 and released before the series premiered. The first of these materials, released on January 26, 2012, featured Hewitt performing Shirley Bassey's "Big Spender" in a music video-style advert, in reference to the true nature of the work at the massage parlor. The video received much interest from the media due to Hewitt's risqué role, who noted that "based on this new promo, the show is going to be seriously hot."

=== Filming and premiere ===
Season 1 consists of 10 episodes. The series began filming on January 17, 2012. Filming of Season 1 ended on May 2, 2012. Season 1 premiered on April 8, 2012 and ended on June 17, 2012.

Filming for the second season began on November 1, 2012. Filming of Season 2 ended on April 18, 2013. Season 2 premiered on March 10, 2013 and ended on June 16, 2013.

== Episodes ==
=== Series overview ===
Season	Episodes	Originally aired	
Season	Episodes	First aired	Last aired
1	10	April 8, 2012	June 17, 2012
2	15	March 10, 2013	June 16, 2013

=== Season 1 (2012) ===
No. overall	No. in season	Title	Directed by	Written by	Original release date	U.S. viewers (millions)
1	1	"The Rub of Sugarland"	Wendey Stanzler	Jordan Budde	April 8, 2012	2.79
Riley Parks, a single mom from Texas, is left alone with her children after her husband Kyle abruptly leaves. In financial trouble and desperate for a job, Riley gets hired at a massage parlor called The Rub. It's not long before she discovers that The Rub has a client list concerning men who expect "extras". Faced with a tough decision, she decides that in order to protect her family, she must do what she has to do. Soon, Riley realizes that the job comes with many secrets and much danger; which is a risk she is going to have to take.
2	2	"Turn the Page"	Allan Arkush	Barbara Nance	April 15, 2012	2.85
Riley finds the phone number of a woman from Kyle's past and begins to investigate her with the help of Lacey. At the massage parlor, Riley meets an interesting client nicknamed The Camel. Meanwhile, Georgia takes all the girls out for drinks, where Riley discovers the fun side of her new job. Also, Lynette begins a romance with someone from church. Riley finds out her husband didn't cheat on her with the woman from his past, but learns something new about his addiction to painkillers.
3	3	"Tough Love"	John Behring	Laurie Arent	April 22, 2012	2.75
Riley's work and family lives become too much to handle. Riley bails on a client twice. Katie gets in trouble in school for swearing, after a boy teases about her father. Georgia promotes Riley to the manager position, which causes a rift between Riley and Selena. Riley learns from Evan that Kyle is somewhere in Mexico. Lynette introduces her new boyfriend Garrett to the family.
4	4	"Ring True"	Patrick Norris	Efrem Seeger	April 29, 2012	2.41
Riley unintentionally gives "extra service" to a good friend of Kendra's fiance. Kendra, who has not told her fiance about what really goes on at her job, fears that it will ruin her relationship. Riley also aids Kendra in preventing the truth from coming out. Riley pleases her friends and family, by going to a party since Kyle left town.
5	5	"Try, Try Again"	Timothy Busfield	Dawn DeKeyser	May 6, 2012	2.51
Riley goes on her first date since Kyle left town, with a client she met. Riley begins to worry about Lynette's blossoming relationship with Garrett, after Garrett asks for Riley's blessing for Lynette's hand in marriage. Jolene reunites with her teenage son, who she gave up for adoption when she was a young struggling mother.
6	6	"The Cold Hard Truth"	Norman Buckley	Marc Halsey	May 13, 2012	2.27
Georgia is worried that the police will raid the parlor. Lacey finds out about what Riley really has been doing at the parlor and does not take the news well.
7	7	"Life of Riley"	Bethany Rooney	John Tinker	May 20, 2012	2.55
Riley helps a client overcome his fear of speaking to women. Riley finds out that Lacey did not tell her that Kyle planned on leaving her. Riley and Selena's rivalry continues, when Riley learns that Evan has been dating Selena.
8	8	"Games People Play"	Patrick Norris	Laurie Arent	June 3, 2012	2.10
Selena runs into Evan at a lunch spot, and also get unwanted attention from a former client, who calls her a whore in front of Evan. Causing him to punch him in the face and defend Selena's name. Riley gets involved with a rodeo cowboy's romantic life. Riley and Selena clash over Selena's relationship with Evan. Riley offers to help Lynette out-bid Taylor for ownership of the salon.
9	9	"Acting Up"	Wendey Stanzler	Hollie Overton	June 10, 2012	2.19
Riley goes on her first date with Mark. Dee Ann's relationship with a councilman gets her in hot water with Georgia; she is then fired. Katie runs away while Riley is on her date. Once Riley and Evan find her, they share a kiss. Kyle returns home.
10	10	"Past Is Prologue"	Jennifer Love Hewitt	Story by : Jennifer Love Hewitt & Barbara Nance; Teleplay by : Barbara Nance	June 17, 2012	2.73
Kyle returns home, but his homecoming is anything but warm. Georgia goes on vacation and leaves Riley in charge of the parlor, which doesn't sit well with Selena. Riley re-hires Dee Ann. An elderly client dies under the care of Riley. A corrupt police officer continues to put pressure on Riley.

=== Season 2 (2013) ===
On May 7, 2012, Lifetime renewed the series for a second season of 15 episodes. Filming for the season began on November 1, 2012, and it premiered on March 10, 2013.

No. overall	No. in season	Title	Directed by	Written by	Original release date	U.S. viewers (millions)
11	1	"'Till I Make it On My Own"	Allan Arkush	Story by : Ed Decter; Teleplay by : Natalie Chaidez	March 10, 2013	2.21
In the middle of their argument the police arrive, Riley apologizes thinking that she is the one that is going to get arrested, only for the police to arrest Kyle. Georgia comes back to the spa after she hears about Kyle and find that Kendra and Jolene quit, forcing Selena and Riley to work together so they don't lose clients; Riley finds it hard to find time for her and Evan. While she tries to get Kyle out of jail, she finds out that he stole a truck that was traveling with copper, and the only way for Kyle to get out of jail is to give up his partner in crime, but he won't do it. Riley goes to Georgia with the idea of having Riley own The Rub so that Georgia can keep her new man, and she can still help out if the girls need her; Georgia finds that there is a search warrant for The Rub and that the police are looking at Riley. Kyle promises his attorney that he has something worth more to the police than his partner; while Kyle and Evan fight over the fact that Evan and Riley are growing closer.
12	2	"Who's Cheatin' Who?"	Andy Wolk	Natalie Chaidez	March 17, 2013	2.08
Overwhelmed with the amount of massages she is giving per day, Riley decides to hire another massuese. She ends up hiring an ex-stripper community college student in need of money for tuition. Georgia becomes manager at her boyfriend's bar and insists Riley make her first payment to her in a check. Riley learns that Kyle's bail hearing was moved up and was set at $7,500. Georgia calls Riley to make sure the client list is "good and hidden". Riley reacts, but when the police show up, they are looking for money. That night, one of Kyle's buddies from prison shows up at her house and hands her a bag full of $100 bills. Later, the police turn up at the spa and want to search. Riley demands a search warrant they do not have, and they leave. Afterwards, Riley takes the bag to the construction site to try and bargain Kyle's way out of jail. The man accepts the money but refuses to drop charges. Afraid of the police, Riley drives out of town and buries the client list. The next morning, the police show up at Riley's again and inform her that her mother has been in an accident.
13	3	"Cowboy Up"	Rick Wallace	Hollie Overton	March 24, 2013	2.00
With both Riley and Evan finding themselves burdened by Kyle's actions, Evan accepts a perilous job in order to help Riley financially. Meanwhile, Linette has a car accident and, at the spa, Riley tries to please a veteran client and hires a male masseur.
14	4	"My Main Trial Is Yet to Come"	Timothy Busfield	Michael Reisz	March 31, 2013	1.85
At the spa, Riley is surprised at what a client asks for and Selena is suspicious of one of the new girls. Meanwhile, Riley learns that Derek is not all that he seems and struggles to make any alone-time for her and Evan.
15	5	"Hell on Heels"	Jonathan Kaplan	Tawnya Bhattacharya & Ali Laventhol	April 7, 2013	2.19
At the spa, Riley discovers that her new client is an 18-year-old virgin and the locker room becomes the venue for uncomfortable situations between Derek and Selena. Meanwhile, at home, Evan offers to take Travis to visit his dad and Linette encourages Katie to enter a pageant. Also, frustrated that she is still not pregnant, Lacey convinces Dale to see a fertility specialist.
16	6	"Unanswered Prayers"	Allan Arkush	Shaina Fewell	April 14, 2013	1.96
While Riley works on Kyle's defense, Evan continues his police academy training and Lacey becomes suspicious of Dale, whose band is rocking out with a girl named Honey (Skyler Day). Meanwhile, at the spa, Derek gets teased by Selena, his frequent client.
17	7	"I Ain't Broke But I'm Badly Bent"	Jennifer Love Hewitt	Natalie Chaidez	April 21, 2013	2.11
At the spa, Riley forms a close bond with a client and the girls have to get creative when there is a power outage. Meanwhile, Riley is shocked when, after fighting with an inmate, Kyle loses his visitation privileges and Lacey and Georgia organise a baby shower for Dale's sister. Riley is offered $50,000 to sleep with a client.
18	8	"Heaven's Just a Sin Away"	Debbie Allen	Nikki Schiefelbein	April 28, 2013	2.39
While Kyle prepares to testify against his former employer, Riley and Lacey go to church with Georgia and Harold and Evan goes on his first date with Shelby. Meanwhile, at the spa, Derek receives a warning from Selena about his client.
19	9	"Save A Horse, Ride A Cowboy"	Norman Buckley	Wendy Straker Hauser	May 5, 2013	2.11
Kyle tries best to work his way back into Riley and his kids' lives. Selena fights her ex-husband over custody of a horse.
20	10	"What Part of No"	John Whitesell	Michael Reisz	May 12, 2013	1.79
Lacey is attacked at Riley's house by someone that Riley believes was looking for the client list. Selena and Nikki fight over Derek.
21	11	"I Miss Back When"	Timothy Busfield	Shaina Fewell	May 19, 2013	2.08
Lacey copes with the aftermath of the break-in and her attack. Attempting to cheer her up, Riley convinces her to attend their high school reunion. When Taylor sees her soon to be ex-husband, Beau, moving on with another woman at the reunion, Taylor reacts causing Riley to intervene. Meanwhile, at the Rub of Sugarland, Selena warns Derek that his client, Lisa wants to take their relationship to the next step, outside the spa. Evan tries to focus on his relationship with Shelby but his past with Riley keeps intruding. Linette struggles with rehab and leans on Kyle for support.
22	12	"When I Say I Do"	Michael Fields	Story by : Sarah Wise; Teleplay by : Tawnya Bhattacharya & Ali Laventhol	June 2, 2013	2.12
Georgia is having doubts hours before she is due to marry Harold. At the wedding, Selena seems to have finally warmed up to the possibility of a serious relationship with Derek. Kyle continues to impress Riley and finally succeeds in persuading Riley to allow him back into the house. Dale proposes to Lacey again at the ball diamond to cheer her up after her miscarriage. Meanwhile, Evan is involved in police raids of massage parlors in the area. A Russian prostitute is arrested and admits to working for Carlyle. Riley is worried that "The Rub" might be next after she hears about the raids on the radio.
23	13	"Whatever It Takes"	Andy Wolk	Hollie Overton	June 9, 2013	1.95
Kyle moves back in with Riley and the kids. Riley tries to get more "legitimate" clients for The Rub as a backup plan now that she and Kyle are in a better place. She sets up a free massage promotion at a golf tournament. Travis lies to Kyle to get him to agree to host Travis' team sleep-over at the house. At the tournament, Riley learns that Judge Overton is the head of the prostitution busting task force Evan is on and accosts him over it in the massage chair. Riley later learns that The Rub has been breached. She and Derek later find that her office has been ransacked, but nothing appears to be taken. Riley heads to the ranch to check on the client list and discovers that it is missing from the box. Nikki confronts Carlyle about trashing Riley's office. Carlyle rebuffs her, saying that he had her followed and knows that Riley did not go to The Rub like she said she had. Carlyle hits Nikki and demands her to leave. Kyle finds out from his lawyer that Vandermeyer put in a plea so Kyle does not have to testify.
24	14	"What Kind of Fool Do You Think I Am"	Jennifer Love Hewitt	Nikki Schiefelbein	June 16, 2013	1.90
With the list missing, Riley begins preparing for the worst by making a video for her kids and cleaning out her personal and business' bank accounts. As she tries to think of who may have taken the list, she is confronted by Judge Overton, who is upset over a threat he received from The Rub. Riley believes the threat came from Nikki, since she was connected to Carlyle, who had been after the list. Before she can confront Nikki about the list, Evan and detective Monroe show up to bring Nikki in for questioning since the task force is moving in on Carlyle's establishments. Riley goes to the police station to find out that Nikki was connected to Carlyle. She later confronts Nikki, who says she has it. Going to retrieve the list, she finds a note that says Carlyle has it. Riley ends up at the hospital where Dale and Lacey are because they were chosen as a child's adoptive parents. She goes home and is confronted by Kyle, whom Evan told Riley was connected to Nikki and Carlyle.
25	15	"Wild Nights are Calling"	Allan Arkush	Story by : Ed Decter; Teleplay by : Michael Reisz	June 16, 2013	2.09
With the prostitution task force closing in, Riley struggles to shield her family from the vengeful competitor Greg Carlyle and protect her employees and customers from being arrested. She steals back the client list from Carlyle's office, then returns to The Rub and sets fire to the office. But Greg Carlyle has followed her there and demands to have the list back. After a brief scuffle between them, Riley is the only one running out of the burning building.

== Controversy ==
The Client List was the subject of a nationwide campaign by licensed massage therapists to stop the show before it aired. The group, "Massage Therapists Against The Client List", asserts that:

The Client List is a series that perpetuates the misconception that Massage Therapy includes inappropriate sexual contact. Massage Therapists are trained healthcare professionals and in most states are licensed and regulated by state medical boards. They adhere to a code of ethics and in some cases are under higher ethical standards than other healthcare professionals – because of these very same misconceptions. Many therapists are now working in doctor's offices and hospitals and providing valuable therapeutic services. The Client List is a huge step backwards."

A&E responded to the controversy with the following press release:

We appreciate your feedback concerning the new Lifetime Television series entitled, The Client List. For many years, Lifetime television has explored the complexity of women's lives and their stories through fiction and non-fiction movies, series and programs. The Client List is a fictionalized story about the experiences of a single mother as she unexpectedly faces dire economic circumstances. The series also features a broad range of characters with alternative points of view who make different choices. The Client List is not intended to depict any specific spa or massage entity, nor in any way demean or disparage the therapeutic massage profession and its benefits and contributions to the health and wellness industry.

== Renewal delay and show cancellation ==
An expected third season renewal for the series was put on hold after the announcement of Jennifer Love Hewitt's pregnancy in June 2013. Hewitt reportedly wanted/insisted the real father of her child, co-star and fiancé Brian Hallisay’s character, to be the father of a fictional baby to be born by her character in the third season, while the show's executives and writers wanted Colin Egglesfield's character to be the father. Lifetime was undecided, which led to a renewal delay that lasted into October 2013. Due to creative differences between Hewitt, Lifetime, Sony Pictures Television, and ITV Studios America, the show was officially canceled on November 1, 2013 after two seasons.

== Ratings ==
The first season of The Client List, consisting of 10 episodes, was watched by an average of 2.51 million viewers per week. The second season, consisting of 15 episodes, was watched by an average of 2.05 million viewers.

== Awards and nominations ==
Awards and nominations for The Client List
Year	Award	Category	Recipients and nominees	Outcome
2012	California on Location Awards	Assistant Location Manager of the Year – Television	Eva M. Schroeder	Won
2013	Young Artist Awards	Best Performance in a TV Series – Recurring Young Actor Ten and Under	Tyler Champagne	Nominated
