= Privileged (TV series) =

- Genre: Comedy drama
- Based on: How to Teach Filthy Rich Girls by Zoey Dean
- Developed by: Rina Mimoun
- Starring: JoAnna Garcia; Lucy Hale; Ashley Newbrough; Michael Cassidy; Allan Louis; Brian Hallisay; Kristina Apgar; Anne Archer
- Composer: Joey Newman
- Country of origin: United States
- Original language: English
- No. of seasons: 1
- No. of episodes: 18

Production
- Executive producers: Rina Mimoun; Bob Levy; Leslie Morgenstein; Michael Engler
- Producers: Peter Burrell; Michael Reisz
- Production location: Malibu, California
- Running time: 42 minutes
- Production companies: Tsiporah; Alloy Entertainment; Warner Bros. Television

Original release
- Network: The CW
- Release: September 9, 2008 – February 24, 2009

Privileged is an American comedy-drama television series that premiered on The CW in the United States and City in Canada from September 9, 2008. The series stars JoAnna Garcia and is based on the 2008 Alloy Entertainment book How to Teach Filthy Rich Girls by Zoey Dean. The series was originally to share the same name as the book, but the name was announced at the upfronts as Surviving the Filthy Rich and later changed again to Privileged on June 24, 2008. It was produced by Alloy Entertainment in association with Warner Bros. Television with executive producers Rina Mimoun, Bob Levy and Leslie Morgenstein. Michael Engler directed the pilot.

On May 19, 2009, The CW cancelled the series of Privileged after one season.

== Plot ==
Twenty-three-year-old Megan Smith (JoAnna Garcia) has a Yale education, a relentlessly positive attitude, and a plan to conquer the world of journalism, despite the fact that she is slaving away at a tabloid rag. Megan's plan is thrown off course when, in one whirlwind day, she gets fired, meets cosmetics mogul Laurel Limoges (Anne Archer), and becomes the live-in tutor for Laurel's twin teen granddaughters in heady Palm Beach, Florida, a world of wealth and power. The girls, Rose (Lucy Hale) and Sage (Ashley Newbrough), are beautiful, rebellious, and less-than-thrilled with their new tutor, but Megan is determined to win them over as she enjoys the perks of her new job: breathtaking private suite, gorgeous convertible, and live-in chef Marco (Allan Louis). Even the neighbors are fabulous in Palm Beach and Megan quickly catches the eye of Will (Brian Hallisay), the wealthy and attractive dilettante who lives on the estate next door and just happens to be dating Megan's estranged sister, Lily (Kristina Apgar). Completing this romantic quadrangle is Megan's best friend Charlie (Michael Cassidy), who is secretly in love with her. Despite her own complicated romantic and family relationships, Megan is committed to making a difference in the lives of her two headstrong charges as she navigates the treacherous waters of high society in Palm Beach.

== Cast ==
- JoAnna Garcia as Megan Smith
- Lucy Hale as Rose Baker
- Ashley Newbrough as Sage Baker
- Michael Cassidy as Charlie Hogan
- Allan Louis as Marco Giordani
- Brian Hallisay as Will Davis
- Kristina Apgar as Lily Smith
- Anne Archer as Laurel Limoges

== Episodes ==
The CW was pleased with the show's initial performance, and in November 2008, extended its original season on order by five episodes, bringing the episode total up to eighteen.

The show's original timeslot was Tuesdays at 9 p.m., where The CW aired the first ten episodes. The next two episodes of Privileged were tested in a new timeslot, on Mondays, December 1 and 8, 2008, at 9 p.m. However, those episodes were also rebroadcast the following night at 9 p.m./ET, in the show's usual time slot, and Privileged continued midseason in the same Tuesday timeslot beginning January 6, 2009. The first season ended with the caption "To be continued ..." However, on May 19, 2009, The CW announced that they would not be renewing Privileged for a second season.

No.	Title	Directed by	Written by	Original release date	U.S. viewers (millions)
1	"Pilot"	Michael Engler	Rina Mimoun	September 9, 2008	2.64
After losing her apartment in a fire and getting sacked from her job at a tabloid paper for not following instructions, Megan Smith, a recent Yale graduate, learns from her editor (Debi Mazar) that mogul Laurel Limoges might be willing to offer her a job: tutoring her two snobby, stuck-up billionaire twin granddaughters so they can get into Duke. Megan accepts the offer, but soon realizes that her new students, Sage and Rose, have no interest in their education. Instead, she meets her neighbor, Will, and goes out on a date with him before Sage calls her asking for her signature on a waiver so she and Rose can be photographed in skimpy bikinis. Megan refuses, so Sage lies to her grandmother and gets her tutor fired. A furious Megan tears into them both: Laurel for neglecting her grandchildren and Sage for wasting her potential and not letting Rose achieve hers. Impressed, Laurel gives Megan a contract protecting her job for the next six months and invites her to a gala that evening. There, Megan runs into her estranged sister Lily, who Sage secretly invited as she feels jealous that Rose looks up to Megan as a big sister.
2	"All About Honesty"	Michael Engler	Rina Mimoun	September 16, 2008	2.43
Megan is ecstatic to be attending a gala event where Laurel introduces her to several influential individuals. However, the event turns sour when Megan gets into a heated argument with Lily, which drives a wedge between her and Laurel as the latter is annoyed that Megan lied to her about having a sister. Rose spots her ex-boyfriend Max with another girl, so to help her, Sage gets Megan's friend Charlie to pose as Rose's new boyfriend. Unfortunately, the sisters crash their car while driving back, and since neither has a license, Megan gets a ticket for letting them drive unsupervised. Laurel is upset that Megan was too busy helping another student to keep an eye on the girls, so they come to an arrangement: Megan asks Laurel to give her a formal interview for the tutoring job, and to dismiss her if it goes poorly. Max gets back together with Rose, but when Megan realizes that Sage dislikes Max and only helped Rose to spite her, they argue and Sage tells Megan that she's a hypocrite for treating Lily like she's better than her. In response, Megan calls Lily to patch things up, only to see her and Will sharing a kiss on the beach.
3	"All About What You Really, Really Want"	Nick Marck	Anna Fricke	September 23, 2008	1.80
After Rose is told that she must repeat her freshman year of high school due to poor grades, Megan visits the headmaster and tries to get her a second chance. However, a connection sparks between the headmaster and Megan and she later accepts a date with him—causing Charlie to feel jealous.
4	"All About the Power Position"	David Paymer	Rina Mimoun and Christopher Fife	September 30, 2008	1.87
Megan is shocked when she finds an adult DVD in Rose's bookbag, but even more shocked when Rose reveals that she is not a virgin and is planning on having sex with her current boyfriend. Meanwhile, Sage invites Lily out to a restaurant to dig up dirt on Megan and the two end up drinking together, something that infuriates Megan. Finally, Megan is worried when she thinks that Jacob might be losing interest in her.
5	"All About Friends and Family"	Joanna Kerns	Michael Reisz	October 7, 2008	2.29
Laurel gives Megan the task of chaperoning the twins' pool party, thus forcing her to cancel plans for a spa weekend with Jacob. Meanwhile, Charlie confesses to Marco that he is in love with Megan, and Megan is convinced by Rose to invite Lily to the pool party but when things start to go wrong when Rose's tennis bracelet gets stolen and Megan blames Lily. Lauren Conrad guest stars as herself.
6	"All About Appearances"	Janice Cooke-Leonard	Christopher Fife	October 21, 2008	1.45
Megan's relationship issues with the opposite sex reach a new level when she realizes that Jacob is still interested in his ex-girlfriend and Charlie decides to put the brakes on their friendship. Meanwhile, Laurel is persuaded by Megan to include Sage and Rose in her marketing campaign.
7	"All About the Haves and the Have-Nots"	Liz Friedlander	David Babcock	October 28, 2008	1.91
Megan finally decides to reunite with her father and invites him over for dinner at the mansion. Meanwhile, Lily is caught by Sage in a compromising position, and Charlie and Megan's friendship may be over after the two have a major confrontation.
8	"All About Defining Yourself"	Paul Lazarus	Jenny Lynn	November 4, 2008	1.85
Megan discovers surprising information about Laurel's past. Meanwhile, Sage and Rose get a publicist to help them with their fame and popularity.
9	"All About Insecurities"	Michael Engler	Scott Weinger	November 11, 2008	1.85
Sage and Rose's publicist gets them gigs at the opening of a hot nightclub, where Rose sings and Sage plays the guitar. Megan's friend from college, Caryn, comes to visit and suggests that she writes an exposé on life in Palm Beach, an idea which Megan rejects. Will invites Megan and Caryn to a tennis match he has been hired to photograph, but Megan accidentally tells his boss about Will's family's wealth, something he had been keeping hidden at work.
10	"All About Overcompensating"	Norman Buckley	Michael Reisz	November 18, 2008	1.54
Megan and Will finally begin dating, but the relationship faces early challenges when Megan discovers that Will is dating other women at the same time. Meanwhile, Rose begins to go to extreme measures to maintain good grades after doing badly on an English exam.
11	"All About Love, Actually"	Michael Engler	Margaux Froley	December 1, 2008	2.20
Megan decides to punish Rose for planning to cheat on her final by grounding her. Meanwhile, Laurel rekindles an old flame, Charlie has doubts about living with Mandy, and Marco gets a new partner in the kitchen.
12	"All About the Ripple Effect"	Ron Lagomarsino	David Babcock and Rina Mimoun	December 8, 2008	1.90
Just as she's finally beginning to adjust to having a relationship with her father, Megan receives an unexpected visit from her mother. Meanwhile, Sage fights her feelings for Luis, and Will finds it difficult to comprehend Megan's family issues.
13	"All About What Lies Beneath"	Liz Friedlander	Anna Fricke	January 6, 2009	1.67
Megan finally confronts her mother without any sugarcoating about how she really feels about being abandoned. Meanwhile, Sage and Rose plan a charity event for Cuban refugees as an excuse for Sage to spend more time with Luis. Also, Charlie goes back to school, but Mandy becomes jealous when she learns that he will be studying with Megan. Finally, Megan learns that Lily is being held in prison.
14	"All About Tough Love"	David Paymer	Rina Mimoun and Christopher Fife	January 13, 2009	1.12
Upon learning that Lily is in prison, Megan rushes to her aid and discovers the reasoning behind her sister's imprisonment. Nonetheless, Will offers to bail Lily out, but Arthur refuses the help as a means to teach his daughter a lesson. Meanwhile, Rose aids Sage in picking out an expensive gift for Luis, but his reaction is nothing like what the twins had anticipated.
15	"All About the Big Picture"	Michael Schultz	Natasha Gaty	January 20, 2009	1.61
Will encourages Megan to distance herself from her family's problems and introduces her to his parents. Meanwhile, Rose and Zachary encounter a bump in their relationship when he discovers a picture of her, Sage, Pete Wentz, and Max, Rose's ex, hanging out at a nightclub.
16	"All About Confessions"	David Paymer	Jenny Lynn	February 3, 2009	1.65
Charlie tells Megan he's going to school in California and kisses her after revealing his feelings for her. Later, Will angrily confronts Charlie at his going-away party after learning what happened and the two come to blows. Elsewhere, Rose uncovers a family secret when she is approached by Miles' daughter, Elyse; and Sage fears Luis will be disappointed to learn she's a virgin, until she discovers he's deeply religious and thus does not believe in pre-marital sex. Luis also invites Sage to church, which causes her to relive her grief over her parents' death and leads to a startling confession.
17	"All About Betrayal"	Ron Lagomarsino	Scott Weinger and David Babcock	February 10, 2009	1.40
Will's father starts a magazine based on Megan and Will's idea, but the pair finds the editor-in-chief difficult to please; Marco goes to drastic measures to win Keith back, but he learns that Keith is now dating a longtime friend; Rose discovers the truth about the identity of her real grandfather, and, along with Sage, they confront Laurel; and Sage confesses her own secret that affects her relationship with Rose dramatically.
18	"All About a Brand New You"	David Paymer	Rina Mimoun	February 24, 2009	1.52
In the season finale, as Marco and Keith plan for their wedding, Rose and Sage's relationship takes a bad turn when Rose decides to ditch their annual plans for spring break and Sage becomes upset. Zachary too feels that Rose is changing rather quickly, and worries about the future of their relationship. Megan and Will break up after a fight, but Will soon recants. In the final scene, Megan wakes up the next day after Marco and Keith's wedding and discovers she had a one-night stand with a random guy just as Will arrives to meet with her. Kathy Griffin guest stars as Marco and Keith's wedding planner.

== Streaming ==
The series is available to stream on Tubi in the US.
