= JoAnna Garcia Swisher =

American actress (born 1979)

JoAnna García
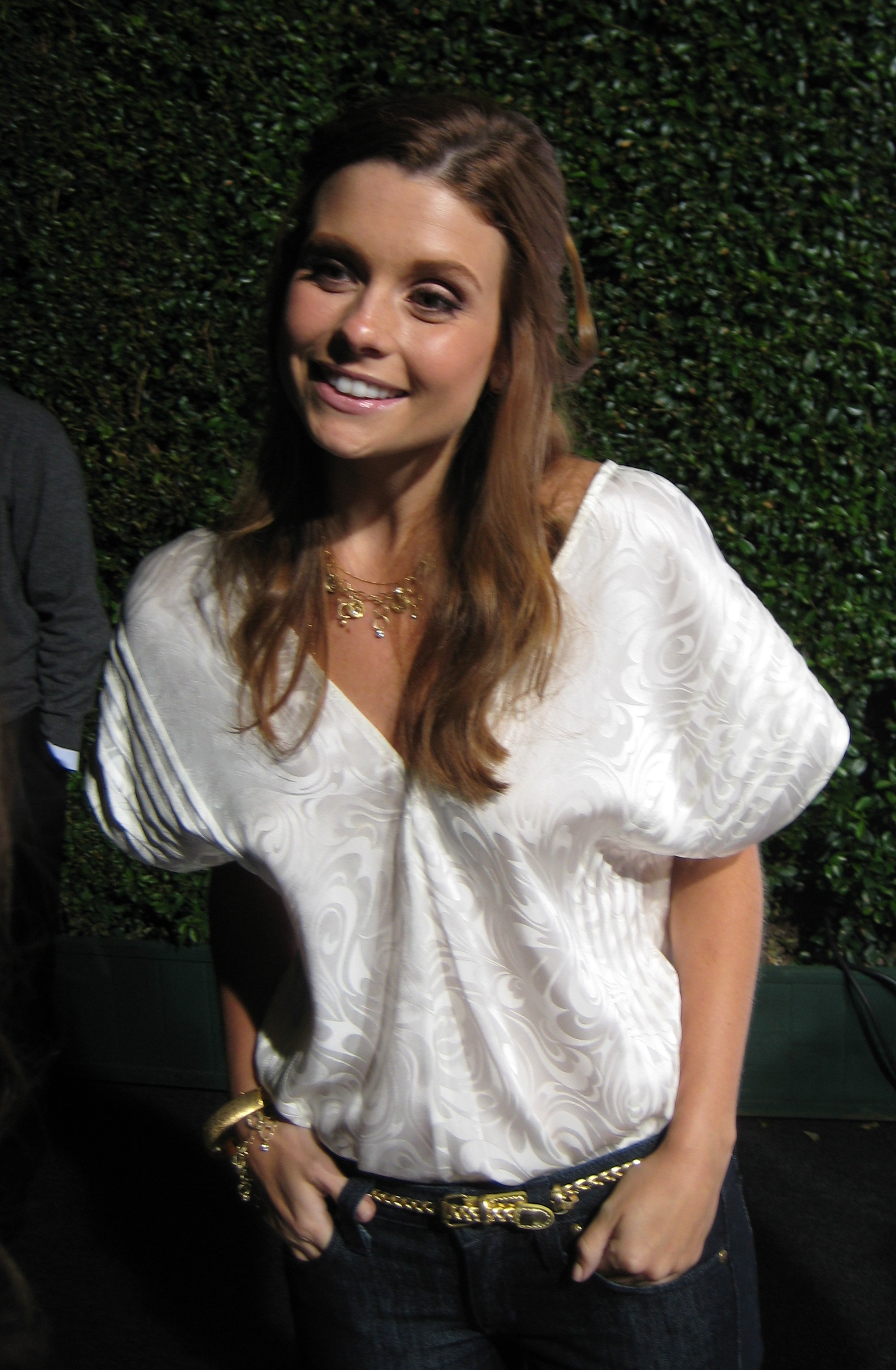
- García in 2008
- Born: August 10, 1979 (age 47)
- Occupation: Actress
- Years active: 1992–present
- Spouse: Nick Swisher (m. 2010)
- Children: 2
- Relatives: Steve Swisher (father-in-law)

JoAnna García Swisher (born August 10, 1979) is an American actress and businesswoman. She is known for her roles as Sam in Are You Afraid of the Dark? (1994–96), Vicki Appleby in Freaks and Geeks (1999–2000), and Cheyenne Hart-Montgomery on The WB/CW sitcom Reba (2001–07). She has also gained popularity with her acting roles in Privileged (2008–09), Better with You (2010–11), Animal Practice (2012), Once Upon a Time (2013–18), The Astronaut Wives Club (2015), Fist Fight (2017) and Sweet Magnolias (2020–26). García also stars as Lindsey Johnson in Hallmark Channel's As Luck Would Have It (2021). She has hosted two seasons of The Ultimatum: Queer Love on Netflix starting in 2023.

== Early life ==
García was born to Loraine, a homemaker and former elementary school teacher, and Jay García (1945–2019), a gynecologist from Cuba.

Disney Channel discovered her, but her parents put school first and she acted in local plays to keep up with her passion. She was the homecoming queen at Florida's Tampa Catholic High School.

== Career ==
While in Florida, García guest starred in seaQuest DSV, Second Noah, and Superboy and several films of the week. While attending high school, she was re-discovered by Nickelodeon and starred for three seasons as Samantha on Are You Afraid of the Dark?. She commuted from Florida to Montreal, Canada, where the show was filmed. She was cast at the age of fifteen on the 1994 television drama Party of Five, playing the recurring character Hallie. She had a recurring role on Freaks and Geeks (1999–2000) portraying the character of Vicki Appleby, the popular freshman cheerleader who spent seven minutes in heaven with the ultimate geek, Bill Haverchuck (Martin Starr). She then briefly attended college at Florida State University where she was a member of the Delta Delta Delta sorority, but later quit school to pursue acting full-time, moving to Los Angeles, California.

García went on to portray the character of Cheyenne Hart-Montgomery, Reba's (Reba McEntire) oldest daughter on The WB/CW sitcom Reba (2001–07). She was featured on the short-lived CBS comedy Welcome to the Captain. Beginning in the fall of 2008, she starred as Megan Smith in the CW series Privileged (originally known as How to Survive the Filthy Rich). On the big screen, García was seen in the comedy spoof Not Another Teen Movie. She has also appeared in the original television miniseries, From the Earth to the Moon (1998), and the television film Love's Deadly Triangle: The Texas Cadet Murder (1997). She also appeared in the ABC Family television film The Initiation of Sarah, which premiered in October 2006. In 2008, she had a role in A Very Merry Daughter of the Bride, playing Roxanne. She had a leading role in the ABC Family television film Revenge of the Bridesmaids alongside Raven-Symoné.

In 2009, García had a recurring role on The CW drama Gossip Girl playing the role of Bree Buckley, an irreverent evil Miss America-type who is politically progressive but from a conservative Southern family. She appeared in four episodes in season three. In December 2009, she guest starred as Maggie, Ted Mosby's college buddy on How I Met Your Mother.

García starred in the ABC sitcom Better with You. The show centers on two sisters who were at different points in their romantic relationships: one was unmarried and in a long-term relationship, and the other (García) got married after getting pregnant from a one-night stand. It was canceled on May 13, 2011.

Garcia guest-starred on The Penguins of Madagascar in the episode "The Officer X Factor/Love Hurts", which aired on February 12, 2011. In 2012, Garcia appeared in four episodes of the USA Network dramedy Royal Pains as a nephrologist treating Jack O'Malley (Tom Cavanagh). In 2013, during season three of the series Once Upon a Time she began playing the recurring role of Ariel from The Little Mermaid.

== Business ventures ==
On May 9, 2022, she launched a home decor collection titled "Clover by Jo" for HSN. The line includes bedding, pillows, mirrors, lamps, lanterns and planters.

During her career, she has graced the covers of numerous magazines such as Latina, Miami Living and Southern Living's first-ever digital issue, The Dream Homes Issue. In 2004, she appeared in a promotional campaign and television commercial for retailer Kmart. In October 2023, Garcia Swisher teamed up with McCormick for back-to-school social media ads and events.

== Personal life ==
Garcia and her husband, outfielder/first baseman Nick Swisher, at Forward Operating Base Shank, Afghanistan on a USO tour to greet troops and tour military facilities, November 25, 2011

In 2008, García became engaged to Trace Ayala, the personal assistant and childhood friend of Justin Timberlake who co-founded the clothing company William Rast.

In August 2009, People magazine reported that García was dating baseball player Nick Swisher. They became engaged in May 2010, and married on December 11, 2010, at the Breakers Hotel & Resort in Palm Beach, Florida. Bridesmaids for García included friends and fellow actresses Jamie-Lynn Sigler, Melissa Peterman, and Reba McEntire. Since her marriage, she has been credited as Joanna García Swisher. They have two daughters, one born in 2013 and the other in 2016.

=== Causes and interests ===
García volunteers as a teacher for children who are learning English as a second language. She is involved with the organization Make the Commitment, whose purpose is to raise awareness about cervical cancer. She has an organization called We Reach, a charity which has assembled an advisory board in the entertainment industry to help young girls around the country organize charity events in their hometowns. The charity also has the goal of empowering young women.

== Filmography ==
=== Film ===
Year	Title	Role
1997	Love's Deadly Triangle: The Texas Cadet Murder	Susie
1999	Holy Joe	Joyce Cass
2001	American Pie 2	Christy
2001	Not Another Teen Movie	Sandy Sue
2006	The Initiation of Sarah	Corinne
2006	A-List	Naomi
2008	A Very Merry Daughter of the Bride	Roxanne
2008	Extreme Movie	Sweetie Pie
2010	Revenge of the Bridesmaids	Parker Wald
2013	The Internship	Megan
2017	Fist Fight	Maggie Campbell
2022	Christmas with the Campbells	Becky

=== Television ===
Year	Title	Role	Notes
1992	Superboy	Girl	Episode: "Obituary for a Superhero"
1992	Clarissa Explains It All	Fiona	Episode: "Take My Advice... Please"
1994–1996	Are You Afraid of the Dark?	Sam	Main role
1994	seaQuest DSV	Iris	Episode: "Playtime"
1996	Step by Step	Chelsea	Episode: "We're Going to Disney World: Part 1"
1996 & 1997	Second Noah	Katherine Ortega	3 episodes
1998	From the Earth to the Moon	Julie Shepard	Miniseries; episode: "For Miles and Miles"
1998	Party of Five	Hallie	5 episodes
1998	Any Day Now	Martha Montgomery	Episode: "It's Who You Sleep With"
1999	Dawson's Creek	Girl #1 – Tracy	Episode: "Be Careful What You Wish For"
1999	Pacific Blue	Leah Chandler	Episode: "Lucky 13"
1999	Providence	Gillian	Episode: "Heaven Can Wait"
1999	CI5: The New Professionals	Cadet Susan	Episode: "Glory Days"
2000	Freaks and Geeks	Vicki Appleby	5 episodes
2000	Opposite Sex	Cassie Schreiber	Episode: "The Homosexual Episode"
2000	Freedom	Sally Mueller	Episode: "Assassins"
2000	Boston Public	Susan Potter	Episode: "Chapter Four"
2001	Go Fish	Amanda	Episode: "Go P.D.A."
2001	Going to California	Jennifer	Episode: "I Know Why the Caged Rhino Sings"
2001–2007	Reba	Cheyenne Hart-Montgomery	Main role
2001	Off Centre	Ramona	Episode: "Let's Meet Mike and Euan"
2004	What I Like About You	Fiona	Episode: "Three Little Words"
2005	Family Guy	Liddane	Voice, episode: "8 Simple Rules for Buying My Teenage Daughter"
2008	Welcome to the Captain	Hope	Main role
2008–2009	Privileged	Megan Smith	Main role
2009	Gossip Girl	Bree Buckley	4 episodes
2009	How I Met Your Mother	Maggie	Episode: "The Window"
2010–2011	Better with You	Mia Putney	Main role
2011	The Penguins of Madagascar	Shauna	Voice, episode: "Love Hurts"
2011	Kick Buttowski: Suburban Daredevil	Shannon	Voice, episode: "Pool Daze"
2012	Royal Pains	Nina Greene	4 episodes
2012	Animal Practice	Dorothy Crane	Main role; 9 episodes
2013–2015, 2017–2018	Once Upon a Time	Ariel	Recurring role (7 episodes)
2014	The Mindy Project	Sally Prentice	3 episodes
2015	The Astronaut Wives Club	Betty Grissom	Main role; 10 episodes
2015	Grandfathered	Sloan	Episode: "Edie's Two Dads"
2016	Pitch	Rachel Patrick	3 episodes
2017–2018	Kevin (Probably) Saves the World	Amy Cabrera	Main role; 16 episodes
2020–2026	Sweet Magnolias	Maddie Townsend	Main role; 50 episodes
2021	As Luck Would Have It	Lindsey Johnson	Television film (Hallmark Channel)
2023	The Ultimatum: Queer Love	Host	6 episodes
2026	Happy's Place	Kenzie	season 2 episode 12 "Social Discontent"

=== Music video ===
Year	Title	Artist(s)	Role
2008	"Every Other Weekend"	Reba McEntire feat. Kenny Chesney	Female lead

== Accolades ==
Year	Association	Category	Work	Result
2005	Teen Choice Awards	Choice TV Actress – Comedy	Reba	Nominated
2009	ALMA Awards	Actress in Television – Comedy	Privileged	Nominated
