= The Circle (American TV series) season 8 =

The Circle
- Season 8
- Promotional poster
- Presented by: Tinx
- No. of episodes: 3

Release
- Original network: Hulu
- Original release: November 17, 2026 – present

Season chronology
- ← Previous; Season 7

The eighth season of the American reality competition streaming series The Circle began airing on November 17, 2026, on Hulu. It is the first season of The Circle since 2024 and the first to air of Hulu following the first seven seasons airing on Netflix hosted by Michelle Buteau. While the earlier seasons were pre-recorded, season eight is produced live, airs three episodes per week, and allows viewers to vote and influence the outcome. The season is hosted by Tinx for the first time.

== Format ==
Season eight of The Circle sees the players moving into the same apartment building in Atlanta, Georgia. Each player has their own individual apartment. The players do not meet face-to-face during the competition. Each player has to create their own profile on a specially designed social media app, and this gives them the ability to portray themselves in any way they choose, whether this be as themselves, or completely different personality to the other players, a tactic otherwise known as catfishing. This app is how the players communicate with each other throughout the competition.

Throughout the competition, the contestants "rate" one another from first to last place. The ratings are later revealed to the players with the average ratings going from lowest to highest. The two highest-rated players usually become "Influencers", and the remaining players are at risk of being "blocked" by them. The "Influencers" discuss through a private chat which player they think should be blocked. There can also be a potential twist when it comes to the blockings – varying from the lowest rating players being instantly blocked, the identity of the Influencers being a secret, or multiple players being blocked at one time. Once a player is blocked, they are permitted to visit one other player and speak to them face-to-face. Otherwise, players do not meet each other in-person until the finale.

Unlike the Netflix iteration and like the first two seasons of British version, this season was produced live and featured viewer voting to influence the game. Each Thursday episode would include details of the decision before America, with viewers invited to text their vote to the designated phone number.

During the finale, the contestants rate each other one final time, where the highest rated player wins the game and US$100,000.

== Players ==
The initial cast for season eight was revealed on November 11, 2026.

Name	Age	Playing as		Entered	Exited	Status
Alyssa Khan	23	Herself, but single		Episode 1	TBA	Participating
Cyrus Irani	23	Himself		Episode 1	TBA	Participating
Dominic DeAngelis	33	Lisa Vanderpump		Episode 1	TBA	Participating
Gina Baffour	26	Gina, but single		Episode 1	TBA	Participating
Yanis Nyantenji	26	Gina, but single		Episode 1	TBA	Participating
Hannah Brown	32	Herself		Episode 1	TBA	Participating
Justin Hinsley	27	Himself		Episode 1	TBA	Participating
Kate Racker	32	"Doug", a single guy (Note: Kate and Layla's identity was chosen by a fan vote)		Episode 2	TBA	Participating
Layla Taylor	25	"Doug", a single guy		Episode 2	TBA	Participating
Suave Pegues	30	Himself	TBA (Note: Suave became the second player to be blocked during the third episode. However, rather than leaving The Circle, he stayed to become a clone of one of his fellow players. He chose to either clone Cyrus or Doug. The public had to decide between the two.)	Episode 1	TBA	Participating
Sasha Farber	42	Himself		Episode 1	Episode 2	Blocked

== Episodes ==
No. overall	No. in season	Title	Day(s)	Original release date	Prod. code	Ref.
Week 1
91	1	"Welcome to the Circle"	Day 1	November 17, 2026	801	TBA
The players are introduced to the Circle and get the game started.: Game: Red Flag, Green Flag - The players are shown a series of statements. If it's not a dating dealbreaker, the players raise a green flag, but if they get the ick, they raise a red flag.; The real Lisa Vanderpump gives Dominic some advice about how to catfish as her convincingly. The players grow suspicious of Cyrus for being the odd one out on some of the questions in the red flag, green flag game, while Justin looks to target Hannah due to her answers. Sasha and Hannah agree to work together due to them being friends from Dancing with the Stars when she competed, while Justin, "Lisa", and Suave make an alliance over their shared love of dogs. "Lisa" tells Gina and Alyssa that she will protect them if she becomes an influencer. Cyrus tries to connect with Justin, but the latter is suspicious. The players ranked each other for the first time: Cyrus finished in eighth place, while Alyssa and Justin finished in first and second place respectively, making them the first Influencers of the season. The two go to the hangout to discuss who to block. Alyssa wants to block Suave, while Justin wants to block Hannah.
92	2	"Y2 Chaotic"	Days 1–3	November 18, 2026	802	TBA
Sasha is blocked from the Circle and visits Alyssa, but she does not reveal this to the other players. Justin and Alyssa each imply the other is responsible for blocking Sasha in the group chat the following morning.: Game: IYKYK - The players go head to head to define different slang words and then must use it in a sentence, which is sent to the rest of the group. The other players then vote for their favorite response.; Layla Taylor and Kate Racker enter the Circle as "Doug", a 27 year old single bisexual guy, and plan to flirt with as many people as possible in order to gain favor. They immediately suspect that "Lisa" is a catfish and accuse her of this in a private chat, which rattles Dominic. "Doug" and "Lisa" later accuse each other publicly during the game which shocks the rest of the players. Alyssa informs Hannah that Justin wanted to block her but that she protected her, strengthening their alliance. "Lisa" and Hannah agree to have each other's backs because they are worried the players are targeting celebrities following Sasha's blocking. Gina reaches out to "Doug", but becomes wary after he flirts too aggressively. "Lisa" tells Cyrus and Justin that she thinks "Doug" speaks like a housewife, and they both resolve to keep an eye on him. The Circle hosts a Y2K party for the players. An alert reveals that the viewers will be able to vote and influence the game in the following episode.
93	3	"Circle Crimes"	Days 3–5	November 19, 2026	803	TBA
Game: Circle Court - Derek Hough presents the players with different charges (e.g. "intent to manipulate") and they must vote on whether the player up for the charge is guilty or innocent. Different players were selected as the "secret prosecutor" each round and had to choose which other player was on trial for each charge.; Justin and Alyssa vote each other "guilty" of their charges and make it clear that they have an issue with one another following their blocking of Sasha. "Doug" publicly lists the players he is and isn't allied with. Gina forms a friendship with Hannah, but implies that she has beef with Suave. Cyrus flirts with "Lisa" and they agree to have each others backs. Following the game, Alyssa approaches Justin and they clear the air. The players rate each other: "Doug" is immune", Suave comes in last place, while Gina and "Lisa" finish in joint first, making them Influencers. The two go to the hangout to discuss who to block. They are aligned in wanting to protect Hannah and Cyrus, while Gina also wants to keep Alyssa, narrowing it down to Suave and Justin who are both in "Lisa"'s dog-lover alliance. They choose to block Suave from the Circle. Before he leaves, Suave informed that he must steal another player's profile to remain in the game. He chooses "Doug" and Cyrus, with viewers then voting for which identity he will play as.
Week 2
94	4	"Episode 4"	TBA	November 24, 2026	804	TBA
95	5	"Episode 5"	TBA	November 25, 2026	805	TBA
96	6	"Episode 6"	TBA	November 26, 2026	806	TBA
Week 3
97	7	"Episode 7"	TBA	December 1, 2026	807	TBA
98	8	"Episode 8"	TBA	December 2, 2026	808	TBA
99	9	"Episode 9"	TBA	December 3, 2026	809	TBA
Week 4
100	10	"Episode 10"	TBA	December 8, 2026	810	TBA
101	11	"Episode 11"	TBA	December 9, 2026	811	TBA
102	12	"Episode 12"	TBA	December 10, 2026	812	TBA
Week 5
103	13	"Episode 13"	TBA	December 15, 2026	813	TBA
104	14	"Episode 14"	TBA	December 16, 2026	814	TBA
105	15	"Episode 15"	TBA	December 17, 2026	815	TBA
106	16	"Episode 16"	TBA	December 18, 2026	816	TBA

== Results and elimination ==
Color key
This player was blocked.
This player was an influencer.
This player was immune from being blocked.
This player was blocked, but returned as a different contestant.

Episodes		1	3
Influencers		Alyssa; Justin	Dominic; Gina & Yanis
Alyssa		1st	5th
Cyrus		8th	6th
Dominic "Lisa"		3rd	=1st
Gina & Yanis "Gina"		7th	=1st
Hannah		6th	3rd
Justin		2nd	4th
Kate & Layla "Doug"		Not in The Circle	Exempt
Suave	"TBD"	5th	7th
Sasha		4th	Blocked (Episode 2)
Notes		none	1
Blocked		Sasha; Influencers' choice to block	Suave; Influencers' choice to block

Notes

- ^Note 1: During Episode 3, the influencers, Dominic and Gina & Yanis, chose to block Suave. However, rather than leaving The Circle, Suave stayed to become a clone of one of his fellow players. He chose to either clone Cyrus or Doug. The public had to decide between the two.

== Production ==
On June 10, 2026, it was announced that the series be picked up for a new iteration after leaving Netflix in 2024. The season would move to Hulu and will be produced live, and incorporate audience voting into the game, like the first two seasons of the British version and will include celebrity contestants. The Circle will premiere with a new host, Christina Najjar, also known as Tinx on November 17, 2026. The season will film in Atlanta, Georgia in the same apartment block had been setup for the sixth and seventh seasons.
