= The Circle (American TV series) season 7 =

The Circle
- Season 7
- Promotional poster
- Presented by: Michelle Buteau
- No. of contestants: 10
- Winners: Jojo Scarlotta; Nicky Scarlotta
- Runner-up: Kevin Fernandez
- No. of episodes: 13

Release
- Original network: Netflix
- Original release: September 11 – October 2, 2024

Season chronology
- ← Previous; Season 6 Next → Season 8

The seventh season of the American reality competition streaming series The Circle began on September 11, 2024, on Netflix, and concluded on October 2, 2024. This season was hosted by Michelle Buteau. It is the last season to air on Netflix and the last season to be hosted by Buteau, with the show moving to Hulu for its eighth season, which aired in 2026.

== Format ==
Season seven of The Circle sees the players moving into the same apartment building in Atlanta, Georgia. Each player has their own individual apartment. The players do not meet face-to-face during the competition. Each player has to create their own profile on a specially designed social media app, and this gives them the ability to portray themselves in any way they choose, whether this be as themselves, or completely different personality to the other players, a tactic otherwise known as catfishing. This app is how the players communicate with each other throughout the competition.

Throughout the competition, the contestants "rate" one another from first to last place. The ratings are later revealed to the players with the average ratings going from lowest to highest. The two highest-rated players usually become "Influencers", and the remaining players are at risk of being "blocked" by them. The "Influencers" discuss through a private chat which player they think should be blocked. There can also be a potential twist when it comes to the blockings – varying from the lowest rating players being instantly blocked, the identity of the Influencers being a secret, or multiple players being blocked at one time. This season also featured the "Disrupter Mode", which was activated to cancel out a players blocking. A blocked player will be immediately eliminated from the game, but they get the opportunity to meet one player still in the game in-person. The day after a blocking, a video message is sent to the remaining players to reveal if their identity was real or fake.

During the finale, the contestants rate each other one final time, where the highest rated player wins the game and US$100,000.

== Players ==
Name	Age	Playing as	Entered	Exited	Status
Jojo Scarlotta	24	"Gianna", Jojo's girlfriend	Episode 1	Episode 13	Winner
Nicky Scarlotta	24	"Gianna", Jojo's girlfriend	Episode 1	Episode 13	Winner
Kevin Fernandez	23	Himself, but listing his occupation as a lifeguard	Episode 1	Episode 13	Runner-up
Madelyn Rusinyak	25	Herself	Episode 2	Episode 13	Third place
Deborah "Deb" Levy	54	"Rachel", a 26-year-old	Episode 1	Episode 13	Fourth place
Antonio Hayes	31	"Tierra", his best friend	Episode 6	Episode 13	Fifth place
Jadejha Edwards	24	Herself	Episode 1	Episode 13	Blocked
Garret Caillouet	29	Himself	Episode 2	Episode 11	Blocked
Darian Holt	29	Himself	Episode 1	Episode 9	Blocked
Heather Richardson	26	"Andy", her bass player friend	Episode 1	Episode 7	Blocked
Savannah Miller	22	Herself	Episode 1	Episode 4	Blocked

== Episodes ==
No. overall	No. in season	Title	Day(s)	Original release date	Prod. code	Ref.
Week 1
78	1	"The Disruption Begins"	Day 1	September 11, 2024	701	TBA
The players are introduced to the Circle and quickly get things started with a game.: Game ("Risky Quizness"): The players must answer if they would do a risky activity. It is then revealed who chose yes or no.; Darian has suspicion cast on him as he answered differently than the rest of the group during the game. Several alliances are starting to form, "Gianna" and "Rachel" bond over their shared history in Staten Island while "Andy", Darian, and Kevin have a bro chat. Rating time comes around quickly and the players submit their first ratings. "Rachel", who Savannah chose as her last place, reaches out to Savannah to hear her story. The ratings are revealed and "Gianna" is in last. "Andy" and Savannah become influencers. The Disrupter Mode is revealed, giving either a huge positive advantage or a negative setback when activated. A 3...2...1... countdown starts and "Gianna" is the first to activate it.
79	2	"It's MY Party..."	Day 1-2	September 11, 2024	702	TBA
"Andy" and Savannah discuss who to eliminate and choose "Gianna". They then reveal it to the players in Circle Chat. It is also revealed that "Gianna" activated disrupter mode earlier and has blocking immunity. Therefore no one is blocked. After a restful night, "Andy" decides to start a chat with "Gianna" and smooth things over which goes well. Darian slides into Jadejha's private chat and Savannah slides into Kevin's private chat. Two new players, Madelyn and Garret, enter the Circle but are not yet revealed.: Game ("Throwback Thirsty"): Each person must post a steamy photo of themselves and the other players will respond with emojis to show how thirsty the photo makes them.; The new players get to lurk on the game before being announced and posting their photos. Disrupter Mode is once again available to be activated - but the players do not know if it will be good or bad this time. Multiple players try to disrupt, Kevin was the first player to claim it and becomes the Disrupter. The Disrupter is invited to the new player welcome party and gets to choose two players to join. Kevin picks Darian and "Gianna" after he is outed as the Disrupter.
80	3	"Battle of the Influencers"	Day 3	September 11, 2024	703	TBA
Kevin starts out the day by inviting Savannah to a private chat to try and explain why he didn't invite her to the party. Savannah is not happy but pretends to accept his explanation. Meanwhile, "Rachel" starts a chat with Jadejha and "Gianna" to ask for the details from the VIP party and proposes an alliance. "Andy" begins a chat to flirt with Madelyn who is convinced "Andy" is not a catfish.: Game ("Kray pop"): Players are asked pop culture multiple choice questions. The answers are then revealed, as well as who got them wrong.; Suspicion is cast on "Rachel" during the game. After the game, players lock in their ratings. "Andy" asks Darian and Kevin about the VIP party. The rating results are then revealed - Savannah is in last place and Kevin and "Gianna" are the influencers. While the influencers decide who to block, the at-risk players chat about their suspicions of the influencers. Kevin then reveals who he and "Gianna" decided to block.
81	4	"Press to Impress"	Day 3-4	September 11, 2024	704	TBA
Savannah is revealed as the player blocked by the influencers in the previous episode. Savannah (and Samson) get to meet one player face-to-face before leaving - she chooses Kevin. She reveals that "Rachel" was questioning Kevin in their at-risk player chat. In the morning the players get to see Savannah's final message where she throws shade at Kevin and "Andy". Things get heated in the ensuing chat, especially between influencers "Gianna" and Kevin. Garret is invited to chat with some of the girls but an invite for a chat with some of the boys interrupts. The Disrupter is once again available and multiple people choose to disrupt. The Disrupters are both Madelyn and "Rachel" who must swap profiles until the next blocking.
Week 2
82	5	"Circle Wedding Crashers"	Day 4	September 18, 2024	705	TBA
"Rachel" and Madelyn have switched profiles and "Rachel", under Madelyn's profile, initiates a chat with Madelyn, under "Rachel's" profile, to get details so they can successfully swap. Madelyn as "Rachel" reaches out to Kevin to try and smooth things over and hopefully avoid a blocking. Jadejha and Garret have a heart-to-heart chat.: Game ("Make out, Marry, Murder"): One by one, they must tell the other players who they would make out, marry, and murder out of the players in the Circle.; "Rachel" as Madelyn starts a spicy chat with "Andy" which goes surprisingly well. Darian and "Gianna" also participate in a chat of their own and warn Darian against Kevin. A wedding party starts the night with everybody dressing up in their best wedding outfits and chatting. A new player, "Tierra", joins the party.
83	6	"Reading Between the Lines"	Day 4-5	September 18, 2024	706	TBA
Everybody snoops on "Tierra's" profile, gets to meet her, and then parties the night away. The next morning comes with an alert - the bottom-rated player will be immediately blocked from the Circle. "Rachel" and Madelyn have another strategy chat and decide the rank "Andy" last so they both have a chance of staying. They then get "Gianna" on board. Kevin, wanting to be the first to get to know "Tierra", starts a private chat.: Game ("Wild Cards"): Each player will anonymously select a tarot card with a stereotypical personality for another player. Some cards include the "Insta baddie", "tea spiller", and "gentle catfish".; "Andy" reaches out to Darian for reassurance about the "alliance breaker" card he got given during the game. "Rachel" as Madelyn chats with "Tierra" and lets her know about the rating "Andy" last plan. Then it is time to submit ratings and they are soon revealed in reverse order. Madelyn and "Rachel" get first and second place.
84	7	"Dawn of the Circle Dead"	Day 5-6	September 18, 2024	707	TBA
"Andy" is the last rated player and is immediately blocked. Before "Andy" leaves, "Andy" gets to meet one player face-to-face. Madelyn is shocked when Heather walks through her door. After a good night's sleep, the players wake to see a video message from "Andy" who reveals herself as Heather. Madelyn reveals that she was the person "Andy"/Heather came to visit and decides to create some fake drama by saying Heather told her someone was disloyal. Kevin reaches out to Madelyn to get more information about her disloyal reveal in the Circle chat. As she made up the information, she tells Kevin it was Darian. Jadejha, "Gianna", Darian, and Garret discuss Madelyn's reveal and decide it was made up just to stir the pot. Meanwhile, "Rachel", Madelyn, and "Tierra" plot to target Darian. A zombie pep rally is just what is needed to break the tension. But as everyone gets dressed up, the players must now rate each other. After the ratings are submitted, Disrupter Mode is once again available to be activated. Multiple players decide to disrupt. Darian becomes the Disrupter but the ratings are soon to be revealed. As the Disrupter, Darian gets to choose one influencer, and the highest-rated layer will become the other influencer.
85	8	"Goating Around"	Day 6-7	September 18, 2024	708	TBA
"Gianna" is ranked first but Darian has until tomorrow to make his decision. The Circle chat gets heated as the players question Madelyn. Darian and Kevin chat privately to clear things up.: Game ("G.O.A.T."): Each player gets to paint a portrait of another player as a goat with a superlative caption. They will then be revealed in the chat anonymously.; Jadejha and Madelyn chat to try and clear the air. Darian then has to select the second influencer and chooses Kevin. Kevin and "Gianna" head up to the influencer chat room again together. Kevin wants to block Darian or Jadejha while "Gianna" thinks "Tierra" or Garret would be a better choice.
Week 3
86	9	"Help! I'm Drowning"	TBA	September 25, 2024	709	TBA
"Gianna" and Kevin finally come to a compromise/ decision and join an alliance and Darian is blocked. Darian goes and sees Jadejha after his blocking and they share a kiss. Kevin takes the blame for blocking Darian and the other players question his motivations and Madelyn whom they suspect he received information about Darian from. Kevin and "Gianna" have a private message and decide to target Garrett. Garret reaches out to Madelyn to get answers. Kevin and "Tierra" have a chat where he shares Madelyn as his source. Madelyn and "Rachel" have a private message and decide to rate Garrett last.: Game ("#CircleAMA"): Each player asks a hard question to another player anonymously.; Kevin takes a lot of heat during the game. "Gianna" and Jadejha clear the air over Darian's blocking and talk about the group suspicions of "Rachel" being a catfish. Kevin and "Rachel" smooth things over. Kevin tries to get "Rachel" to admit to being a catfish and he fesses up to lying about his lifeguarding job. The players have to rate each other.
87	10	"A Circle Trilogy"	Day 8	September 25, 2024	710	TBA
"Gianna" and Kevin start the day by strategizing. "Tierra" starts a chat with Jadejha and shares some life stories to gain Jadejha's trust.: Game ("Pick 3"): Everyone is given a list of 15 things where they can only pick the top 3 things they can not live without.; Madelyn checks in with "Rachel" on their alliance. They both decide to rank Garret last. Garret invites "Rachel" to a private chat. The players must then lock in their ratings. A while later the ratings are revealed. "Gianna" and Kevin are once again the influencers. While the influencers chat, the at-risk players are confused about how Kevin and "Gianna" are influencers again.
88	11	"Incoming Call"	Day 8-9	September 25, 2024	711	TBA
Kevin and "Gianna" decide to block Garret. Garret goes to see "Rachel" and ask her about their friendship. After a night's sleep, the players awake to a message from Garret. He throws everyone under the bus for giving Kevin and "Gianna" a shot. A fight ensues in the Circle chat. Madelyn and "Rachel" have a falling out. "Gianna" checks in with "Rachel" who is feeling used. They decide to join forces against Madelyn. Jadejha sets up a group chat with "Tierra" and Madelyn. Madelyn is hesitant to ally with them but tells them she is in. The players receive a nice surprise, video calls with family and friends at home. Kevin checks in with Madelyn about last night. They then invite "Gianna" into the chat where Madelyn shares info about her chat with Jadejha and "Tierra". It is revealed that the top-rated player will become the top-secret superinfluencer who singlehandedly gets to decide who the block. The ratings will not be revealed.
89	12	"It's Giving Season"	Day 10	September 25, 2024	712	TBA
The players strategize about ratings. Jadejha and Kevin form a pact but Kevin is lying to Jadejha. "Tierra" and "Gianna" discuss who they want to leave the Circle.: Game ("It's Giving Awards"): The players vote anonymously on who they think should win each category.; Madelyn is the secret superinfluencer and solely gets to choose who to block - the twist - she has to do it in person.
Week 4
90	13	"Finale"	Day 11	October 2, 2024	713	TBA
Madelyn blocks Jadejha face-to-face. Jadejha leaves a celebratory video message. The players must then make their final ratings. After they are submitted, the players all get to meet in person. "Gianna" is the winner of the Circle.

== Results and elimination ==
Color key
This player was blocked.
This player was an influencer.
This player was immune from being blocked.

Episodes	1	3	6	8	10	12	13	
Influencers	Heather; Savannah	Kevin; Jojo and Nicky	none	Jojo and Nicky; Kevin	Jojo and Nicky; Kevin	Madelyn	none	
Jojo and Nicky "Gianna"	7th	2nd	5th	1st	1st	Not published	Winner (Episode 13)	
Kevin	4th	1st	7th	5th	2nd	Not published	Runner-up (Episode 13)	
Madelyn	Not in The Circle	Exempt	1st	6th	6th	Not published	Third place (Episode 13)	
Deb "Rachel"	6th	=5th	2nd	2nd	3rd	Not published	Fourth place (Episode 13)	
Antonio "Tierra"	Not in The Circle		Exempt	7th	4th	Not published	Fifth place (Episode 13)	
Jadejha	3rd	4th	3rd	=3rd	5th	Not published	Blocked (Episode 13)	
Garret	Not in The Circle	Exempt	4th	=3rd	7th	Blocked (Episode 11)		
Darian	5th	3rd	6th	8th	Blocked (Episode 9)			
Heather "Andy"	1st	=5th	8th	Blocked (Episode 7)				
Savannah	2nd	7th	Blocked (Episode 4)					
Notes	1	none	2	3	none	4	5	
Blocked	~~Jojo and Nicky "Gianna"~~; ~~Influencers'~~; ~~choice to block~~	Savannah; Influencers' choice to block	Heather "Andy"; Lowest rated player	Darian; Influencers' choice to block	Garret; Influencers' choice to block	Jadejha; Superinfluencer's choice to block	Antonio "Tierra"; Lowest rated player	Deb "Rachel"; Fourth highest rated player
Blocked	~~Jojo and Nicky "Gianna"~~; ~~Influencers'~~; ~~choice to block~~	Savannah; Influencers' choice to block	Heather "Andy"; Lowest rated player	Darian; Influencers' choice to block	Garret; Influencers' choice to block	Jadejha; Superinfluencer's choice to block	Madelyn; Third highest rated player	Kevin; Second highest rated player
Blocked	~~Jojo and Nicky "Gianna"~~; ~~Influencers'~~; ~~choice to block~~	Savannah; Influencers' choice to block	Heather "Andy"; Lowest rated player	Darian; Influencers' choice to block	Garret; Influencers' choice to block	Jadejha; Superinfluencer's choice to block	Jojo and Nicky "Gianna"; Highest rated player	

Notes

- ^Note 1: In Episode 1, Disrupter Mode is revealed, the first player to activate it gets either a huge advantage or disadvantage. "Gianna" is the first to activate it. In Episode 2, the influencers decide to block "Gianna" but it is revealed that the Disrupter advantage is blocking immunity and thus "Gianna" is immune from blocking.
- ^Note 2: There were no influencers, the lowest-rated player would be immediately blocked.
- ^Note 3: Darian is the Disrupter and gets to select one of the influencers and chooses Kevin. The other influencer is the highest-rated player, "Gianna".
- ^Note 4: The highest rated player becomes the sole secret superinfluencer. Madelyn is rated first.
- ^Note 5: The players submit their ratings and they are revealed in person one by one.
