= List of The Circle (American TV series) episodes =

The following is a list of episodes from The Circle (sometimes called The Circle US to differentiate from other international versions), an American reality competition series, produced by Studio Lambert and Motion Content Group which first aired on Netflix in January 2020 that is based on a British TV series of the same name.

The series will be broadcast on Hulu starting in 2027, after Netflix decided not to renew any future seasons in June 2026.

== Series overview ==
Season	Players	Host	Prize	Episodes	Originally released			Winner	Runner-up	Fan favorite
Season	Players	Host	Prize	Episodes	First released	Last released	Network	Winner	Runner-up	Fan favorite
1	14	Michelle Buteau	$100,000	12	January 1, 2020	January 15, 2020	Netflix	Joey Sasso	Shubham Goel	Samantha "Sammie" Cimarelli
2	11	Michelle Buteau	$100,000	13	April 14, 2021	May 5, 2021	Netflix	DeLeesa St. Agathe as "Trevor"	Chloe Veitch	Chloe Veitch
3	13	Michelle Buteau	$100,000	13	September 8, 2021	September 29, 2021	Netflix	James Andre Jefferson Jr.	Matthew Pappadia as "Ashley"	Keisha "Kai" Ghost
4	13	Michelle Buteau	$150,000	13	May 4, 2022	May 25, 2022	Netflix	Frank Grimsley	Trevor St. Agathe as "Imani"	Josh "Bru" Brubaker
5	13	Michelle Buteau	$100,000	13	December 28, 2022	January 18, 2023	Netflix	Sam Carmona	Chaz Lawery	—N/a
6	11	Michelle Buteau	$100,000	13	April 17, 2024	May 8, 2024	Netflix	Brandon Baker as "Olivia"	Kyle Fuller	—N/a
7	10	Michelle Buteau	$100,000	13	September 11, 2024	October 2, 2024	Netflix	Nicky and Jojo Scarlotta as "Gianna"	Kevin Fernandez	—N/a
8	TBA	Tinx	TBA	16	November 17, 2026	December 18, 2026	Hulu	TBA	TBA	TBA

== Episodes ==
=== Season 1 (2020) ===
No. overall	No. in season	Title	Day(s)	Original release date	Prod. code	Ref.
Week 1
1	1	"Hello, Circle"	Day 1	January 1, 2020 (Note: On December 30, 2019, Netflix released a shortened exclusive cut of the first episode on their YouTube channel as a preview to the series.)	TC-101	
2	2	"Face-to-Face"	Days 1-2	January 1, 2020	TC-102	
3	3	"There's a Catfish Among Us"	Days 2-3	January 1, 2020	TC-103	
4	4	"Planting Doubt"	Days 3-4	January 1, 2020	TC-104	
Week 2
5	5	"Sliding into DMs"	Days 4-5	January 8, 2020	TC-105	
6	6	"Anonymous Trolling"	Days 5-6	January 8, 2020	TC-106	
7	7	"Picking Teams"	Days 6-7	January 8, 2020	TC-107	
8	8	"The Player I'm Saving Is…"	Days 7-8	January 8, 2020	TC-108	
Week 3
9	9	"Instant Block"	Days 8-9	January 15, 2020	TC-109	
10	10	"Declare Your Rival"	Days 9-10	January 15, 2020	TC-110	
11	11	"The Last Rating"	Days 10-12	January 15, 2020	TC-111	
12	12	"Finale"	Day 12	January 15, 2020	TC-112	

=== Season 2 (2021) ===
No. overall	No. in season	Title	Day(s)	Original release date	Prod. code	Ref.
Week 1
13	1	"Back and More Savage Than Ever"	Day 1	April 14, 2021	TC-201	TBA
14	2	"Alliances Are Formed"	Days 1-2	April 14, 2021	TC-202	TBA
15	3	"Bye, Bye, Bye!"	Days 3-4	April 14, 2021	TC-203	TBA
16	4	"Lines Are Drawn"	Days 4-5	April 14, 2021	TC-204	TBA
Week 2
17	5	"Snake in the Grass"	Days 5-6	April 21, 2021	TC-205	TBA
18	6	"A Love Triangle"	Days 6-7	April 21, 2021	TC-206	TBA
19	7	"Friend Zoned...."	Days 7-8	April 21, 2021	TC-207	TBA
20	8	"Damage Control"	Days 8-9	April 21, 2021	TC-208	TBA
Week 3
21	9	"A New Twist"	Days 9-10	April 28, 2021	TC-209	TBA
22	10	"Campaigning to Win"	Days 10-11	April 28, 2021	TC-210	TBA
23	11	"The Master Plan"	Days 11-12	April 28, 2021	TC-211	TBA
24	12	"The Last Blocking"	Days 12-13	April 28, 2021	TC-212	TBA
Week 4
25	13	"And The Winner Is..."	Days 13-14	May 5, 2021	TC-213	TBA

=== Season 3 (2021) ===
No. overall	No. in season	Title	Day(s)	Original release date	Prod. code	Ref.
Week 1
26	1	"Circle, Did You Miss Me?"	Day 1	September 8, 2021	TC-301	
27	2	"A New Twist"	Days 1-2	September 8, 2021	TC-302	
28	3	"Identity Theft"	Days 2-3	September 8, 2021	TC-303	
29	4	"A Flirtatious Alliance"	Days 3-4	September 8, 2021	TC-304	
Week 2
30	5	"The Real Michelle"	Days 4-5	September 15, 2021	TC-305	
31	6	"A New Member of the Wolfpack"	Days 5-7	September 15, 2021	TC-306	
32	7	"Shock Blocking"	Days 7-8	September 15, 2021	TC-307	
33	8	"Full Out War"	Days 8-9	September 15, 2021	TC-308	
Week 3
34	9	"Ghostbusting & Catfishing"	Days 9-10	September 22, 2021	TC-309	
35	10	"A Circle Divided"	Days 10-11	September 22, 2021	TC-310	
36	11	"Choosing Sides"	Days 11-12	September 22, 2021	TC-311	
37	12	"The Final Stretch"	Days 13-14	September 22, 2021	TC-312	
Week 4
38	13	"Finale"	Day 15	September 29, 2021	TC-313	

=== Season 4 (2022) ===
No. overall	No. in season	Title	Day(s)	Original release date	Prod. code	Ref.
Week 1
39	1	"A Spicy Start"	Day 1	May 4, 2022	TC-401	
40	2	"Cake Me As I Am"	Days 1-2	May 4, 2022	TC-402	
41	3	"90's Party Surprise"	Days 2-3	May 4, 2022	TC-403	
42	4	"Nobody Is Safe"	Days 3-4	May 4, 2022	TC-404	
Week 2
43	5	"Goodbye My Friends"	Days 4-5	May 11, 2022	TC-405	
44	6	"All Is Fair in Circle War"	Days 5-6	May 11, 2022	TC-406	
45	7	"The Party Divide"	Days 6-7	May 11, 2022	TC-407	
46	8	"Circle Cyber Attack"	Days 7-8	May 11, 2022	TC-408	
Week 3
47	9	"Trust Is Tested"	Days 8-9	May 18, 2022	TC-409	
48	10	"A Plea for Survival"	Day 10	May 18, 2022	TC-410	
49	11	"Throw to the Wolves"	Days 10-11	May 18, 2022	TC-411	
50	12	"Just When You Thought You Were Safe"	Day 12	May 18, 2022	TC-412	
Week 4
51	13	"A Winner Is Crowned"	Days 12-13	May 25, 2022	TC-413	

=== Season 5 (2022–23) ===
No. overall	No. in season	Title	Day(s)	Original release date	Prod. code	Ref.
Week 1
52	1	"Single and Ready To Mingle"	Day 1	December 28, 2022	TC-501	TBA
53	2	"An Unlikely Team Emerges"	Days 1-2	December 28, 2022	TC-502	TBA
54	3	"I Can’t Believe I Just Sent That…"	Day 3	December 28, 2022	TC-503	TBA
55	4	"Who to Save?"	Days 3-4	December 28, 2022	TC-504	TBA
Week 2
56	5	"Hi Old Friend"	Days 4-5	January 4, 2023	TC-505	TBA
57	6	"A Desperate Alliance"	Days 5-6	January 4, 2023	TC-506	TBA
58	7	"Glam Party Twist"	Days 6-7	January 4, 2023	TC-507	TBA
59	8	"An F-Boy Is Exposed"	Days 7-8	January 4, 2023	TC-508	TBA
Week 3
60	9	"Return of the Inner Circle"	Days 8-9	January 11, 2023	TC-509	TBA
61	10	"The Hunt for the Hacker"	Days 9-10	January 11, 2023	TC-510	TBA
62	11	"Circle Power Couple"	Days 10-11	January 11, 2023	TC-511	TBA
63	12	"A Brutal Blocking"	Days 11-12	January 11, 2023	TC-512	TBA
Week 4
64	13	"Finale"	Days 12-13	January 18, 2023	TC-513	TBA

=== Season 6 (2024) ===
No. overall	No. in season	Title	Day(s)	Original release date	Prod. code	Ref.
Week 1
65	1	"New City Who Dis?"	Day 1	April 17, 2024	TC-601	TBA
66	2	"Bro Code"	Day 1-2	April 17, 2024	TC-602	TBA
67	3	"I'm Only Human...Or Am I?"	Day 3	April 17, 2024	TC-603	TBA
68	4	"Spot the Bot"	Day 3-4	April 17, 2024	TC-604	TBA
Week 2
69	5	"Portrait Pitfalls"	Day 4-5	April 24, 2024	TC-605	TBA
70	6	"That DM Slide"	Day 6	April 24, 2024	TC-606	TBA
71	7	"Ride or Die"	Day 6-7	April 24, 2024	TC-607	TBA
72	8	"Who Ordered The Sacrificial Lamb?"	Day 7-8	April 24, 2024	TC-608	TBA
Week 3
73	9	"Naughty or Nice"	Day 8-9	May 1, 2024	TC-609	TBA
74	10	"A Deadly Deadlock"	Day 9-10	May 1, 2024	TC-610	TBA
75	11	"It's Giving Sus"	Day 10-11	May 1, 2024	TC-611	TBA
76	12	"A Final Power Move"	Day 12	May 1, 2024	TC-612	TBA
Week 4
77	13	"Finale"	Day 12-13	May 8, 2024	TC-613	TBA

=== Season 7 (2024) ===
No. overall	No. in season	Title	Day(s)	Original release date	Prod. code	Ref.
78	1	"The Disruption Begins"	Day 1	September 11, 2024	701	TBA
79	2	"It's MY Party..."	Day 1-2	September 11, 2024	702	TBA
80	3	"Battle of the Influencers"	Day 3	September 11, 2024	703	TBA
81	4	"Press to Impress"	Day 3-4	September 11, 2024	704	TBA
82	5	"Circle Wedding Crashers"	Day 4	September 18, 2024	705	TBA
83	6	"Reading Between the Lines"	Day 4-5	September 18, 2024	706	TBA
84	7	"Dawn of the Circle Dead"	Day 5-6	September 18, 2024	707	TBA
85	8	"Goating Around"	Day 6-7	September 18, 2024	708	TBA
86	9	"Help! I'm Drowning"	TBA	September 25, 2024	709	TBA
87	10	"A Circle Trilogy"	Day 8	September 25, 2024	710	TBA
88	11	"Incoming Call"	Day 8-9	September 25, 2024	711	TBA
89	12	"It's Giving Season"	Day 10	September 25, 2024	712	TBA
90	13	"Finale"	Day 11	October 2, 2024	713	TBA

=== Season 8 (2026) ===
No. overall	No. in season	Title	Day(s)	Original release date	Prod. code	Ref.
91	1	"Episode 1"	TBA	November 17, 2026	801	TBA
92	2	"Episode 2"	TBA	November 18, 2026	802	TBA
93	3	"Episode 3"	TBA	November 19, 2026	803	TBA
94	4	"Episode 4"	TBA	November 24, 2026	804	TBA
95	5	"Episode 5"	TBA	November 25, 2026	805	TBA
96	6	"Episode 6"	TBA	November 26, 2026	806	TBA
97	7	"Episode 7"	TBA	December 1, 2026	807	TBA
98	8	"Episode 8"	TBA	December 2, 2026	808	TBA
99	9	"Episode 9"	TBA	December 3, 2026	809	TBA
100	10	"Episode 10"	TBA	December 8, 2026	810	TBA
101	11	"Episode 11"	TBA	December 9, 2026	811	TBA
102	12	"Episode 12"	TBA	December 10, 2026	812	TBA
103	13	"Episode 13"	TBA	December 15, 2026	813	TBA
104	14	"Episode 14"	TBA	December 16, 2026	814	TBA
105	15	"Episode 15"	TBA	December 17, 2026	815	TBA
106	16	"Episode 16"	TBA	December 18, 2026	816	TBA
