= The Circle (American TV series) season 6 =

The Circle
- Season 6
- Promotional poster for the season
- Presented by: Michelle Buteau
- No. of contestants: 11
- Winner: Brandon Baker
- Runner-up: Kyle Fuller
- No. of episodes: 13

Release
- Original network: Netflix
- Original release: April 17 – May 8, 2024

Season chronology
- ← Previous; Season 5 Next → Season 7

The sixth season of the American reality competition streaming series The Circle premiered on Netflix on April 17, 2024. Michelle Buteau returned as host. Players compete without ever actually meeting in person; they communicate through a simulated social media interface, portraying themselves in any way they choose.

== Format ==
The players move into the same apartment building. However, the contestants do not meet face-to-face during the course of the competition, as they each live in their own individual apartment. They communicate solely using their profiles on a specially designed social media app that gives them the ability to portray themselves in any way they choose. Players can thus opt to present themselves as a completely different personality to the other players, a tactic otherwise known as catfishing.

Throughout the series, the contestants "rate" one another from first to last place. At the end of the ratings, their average ratings are revealed to one another from lowest to highest. Normally, the two highest-rated players become "Influencers", while the remaining players will be at risk of being "blocked" by the Influencers. However, occasionally there may be a twist to the blocking process – varying from the lowest rating players being instantly blocked, the identity of the Influencers being a secret, or multiple players being blocked at one time. Blocked players are eliminated from the game, but are given the opportunity to meet one player still in the game in-person. Then, the day after a blocking, a video message is shown to the remaining players to reveal if they were real or fake.

During the finale, the contestants rate each other one final time, where the highest rated player wins the game and US$100,000.

== Production ==
=== Development and release ===
In October 2021, it was reported that after filming of the fifth season had been completed, the block of apartments used to film most seasons of the entire The Circle franchise were being dismantled and converted back into regular housing. In September 2023, it was reported that a new apartment block had been setup for filming in Atlanta, Georgia, and filming of an unannounced sixth season was underway. In November 2023, Netflix officially announced that The Circle had been renewed for a sixth and seventh season, both of which had already been filmed. The sixth season premiered on April 17, 2024.

Michelle Buteau, who hosted the first five seasons, returned for the sixth.

=== AI player ===
This season introduced a new twist: an AI player. The AI used was not brand-new but created from open-source AI trained on past episodes of The Circle. The AI then created its own profile choosing Max, a 26 year old veterinarian intern. When asked to explain the decisions behind the profile, Max explained he chose to be 26 as then he can "leverage life experience and maturity while still playing youthful and having position flexibility." When choosing a profile picture, Max chose one with his dog, Pippa, as "studies show photos with dogs receive 38% more likes on social media." He even came up with the name Pippa. Max struggled with confrontation and when asked to help determine if Paul was the AI, quickly left the chat. The AI system itself has a built in "moral code" that stops him from expressing negative or mean thoughts. Another struggle of Max's - flirting. What Max did grasp, and even the producers were surprised by, was his use of hashtags and understanding the nuances and references behind them.

== Players ==
The contestants were announced on April 16, 2024.

'The Circle' Season 6 Contestants (Ages stated are at start of contest)
Name	Age	Playing as	Entered	Exited	Status	Ref.
Brandon Baker	34	"Olivia", his friend	Episode 1	Episode 13	Winner	
Kyle Fuller	31	Himself, but as a single basketball trainer	Episode 1	Episode 13	Runner-up	
Quori-Tyler Bullock	26	Herself	Episode 1	Episode 13	Third place	
Jordan Staff	24	Himself, but younger (22), and from before his weight loss	Episode 6	Episode 13	Fourth place	
Lauren LaChant	26	Herself	Episode 1	Episode 13	Fifth place	
Myles Reed	29	Himself	Episode 1	Episode 13	Blocked	
Autumn Ann Nielsen	21	Herself	Episode 6	Episode 11	Blocked	
Caress Alon	37	"Paul", her younger brother	Episode 1	Episode 9	Blocked	
Cassie Saylor	29	Herself	Episode 1	Episode 7	Blocked	
A.I. Bot	—N/a	"Max", a 26-year-old veterinary intern	Episode 1	Episode 5	Left	
Steffi Hill	35	Herself	Episode 1	Episode 5	Blocked	

Ride or Die Partners
Jordan & Quori-Tyler
Kyle & "Paul"
Lauren & Autumn
Myles & "Olivia"

=== Future appearances ===
In 2025, Quori-Tyler Bullock and Kyle Fuller appeared on the first season of Battle Camp. Later that year, Bullock appeared on third season of Perfect Match.

== Episodes ==
No. overall	No. in season	Title	Day(s)	Original release date	Prod. code	Ref.
Week 1
65	1	"New City Who Dis?"	Day 1	April 17, 2024	TC-601	TBA
The first seven players (Kyle, Lauren, "Olivia"/Brandon, Myles, Cassie, Steffi, & "Paul"/Caress) enter the apartment building and create their profiles.: Game ("For Real For Real"): Players answer yes or no questions based on their morality.; The players had to rate each other, resulting in "Olivia"/Brandon and Lauren becoming influencers. As influencers, they each had the power to pick between two players to join the game. "Olivia"/Brandon picked Quori-Tyler and Lauren picked Max.
66	2	"Bro Code"	Day 1-2	April 17, 2024	TC-602	TBA
Quori-Tyler and "Max" enter the game and create their profiles. Alliances are formed to improve each other's ratings. It is revealed that one player is an AI.: Game ("Rap It Up"): Players write their own raps about a player of their choice.
67	3	"I'm Only Human...Or Am I?"	Day 3	April 17, 2024	TC-603	TBA
The hunt for the AI player is on. Rankings this episode are based on "most human" to "least human" player.: Game ("I'm Only Human"): Players are put up to three tasks to prove their humanity - joke telling, interpreting emotions, and problem-solving.; Players struggle to determine the AI player's identity after the game. It is then revealed that the player ranked "most human" will singlehandedly choose who to block.
68	4	"Spot the Bot"	Day 3-4	April 17, 2024	TC-604	TBA
Myles has a difficult decision to make as he is ranked the "most human" player.: Activity ("Upload a photo of the day you felt most alive"): Players upload one photo to try and demonstrate their humanity.; The AI player is still making waves as players try to discover the AI player's identity while proving their innocence.
Week 2
69	5	"Portrait Pitfalls"	Day 4-5	April 24, 2024	TC-605	TBA
Myles blocks Steffi face-to-face. Max is revealed as the AI player and leaves the game.: Game ("Poor-Traits"): Players anonymously draw a portrait of another player of their choice that highlights a poor trait; Drama is stirred up from the game. Quori-Tyler sets up strategic alliances.
70	6	"That DM Slide"	Day 6	April 24, 2024	TC-606	TBA
Autumn and Jordan join the circle. The other players compete to be the first to talk to the new players. Another round of ratings leaves two influencers with a tough decision.
71	7	"Ride or Die"	Day 6-7	April 24, 2024	TC-607	TBA
Cassie is blocked and has lots to share in her video.: Game ("It's Personal"): Players must choose between two options and answers are kept anonymous while the overall percentage of players choosing each option is revealed. At the end, each player is paired up with their most compatible companion, their ride-or-die, which must be kept secret.; After the game, some players strengthen existing connections while others are left to ally with their enemies. Myles accidentally starts a fire while cooking and is banned from cooking. A dance party ends the night, but not before an alert that if a players ride-or-die is eliminated, they are as well.
72	8	"Who Ordered The Sacrificial Lamb?"	Day 7-8	April 24, 2024	TC-608	TBA
Players must rethink their strategy now that they are paired in teams.: Game ("Circle Scenarios"): Players must answer who is most and least likely to end up in a certain scenario.; Autumn gets ganged up on during the game. "Olivia"/Brandon reaches out to apologize. Either Kyle or "Paul"/Caress is voted the least popular player. They are both offered the choice to block themselves to save their ride-or-die or they both go home.
Week 3
73	9	"Naughty or Nice"	Day 8-9	May 1, 2024	TC-609	TBA
"Paul"/Caress chooses to sacrifice herself while Kyle chooses to stay. "Paul"/Caress gets to meet Kyle face-to-face before leaving. Autumn is confused about how she is still here after the game last episode.: Game ("Naughty and Nice"): Players must post two photos, one naughty and one nice. They must then vote for the naughtiest and nicest players. "Olivia"/Brandon is voted as the nicest, and Lauren the naughtiest.; Before ratings, it is revealed that the highest-rated player and their ride-or-die will become influencers.
74	10	"A Deadly Deadlock"	Day 9-10	May 1, 2024	TC-610	TBA
Ratings are submitted and the next day begins.: Game ("Oh We Are Going There"): Players get to ask an anonymous question to a designated player.; Quori-Tyler is voted as the most popular player and becomes an influencer, Jordan, as her ride-or-die, also becomes a secret influencer. The influencer chat gets heated as Quori-Tyler and Jordan have opposite views on who to block.
75	11	"It's Giving Sus"	Day 10-11	May 1, 2024	TC-611	TBA
After several disagreements, Quori-Tyler leaves the influencer chat with Jordan and unilaterally decides who to block. She decides to block Autumn. Autumn decides to meet Jordan before leaving. Players are no longer tethered to their ride-or-die and The Circle becomes a singles game again. Autumn leaves a scathing message during her goodbye video. Jordan gets heated at Quori-Tyler in The Circle chat and a fight ensues. Myles and "Olivia"/Brandon decide to continue their alliance (and add in Quori-Tyler and Kyle) despite ride-or-die being discontinued.: Game ("Night of Endless Heartbreak"): Each player gets to choose one other player to send a gift to. It is then revealed who got/gave gifts.
76	12	"A Final Power Move"	Day 12	May 1, 2024	TC-612	TBA
Myles learns that Jordan has been conspiring against him. The players receive videos from loved ones at home cheering them on. Players submit their ratings and the top-rated player becomes the super influencer. "Olivia"/Brandon is the secret super influencer. The identity of the secret super influencer will never be revealed.
Week 4
77	13	"Finale"	Day 12-13	May 8, 2024	TC-613	TBA
Myles is blocked by the super secret influencer "Olivia"/Brandon. Myles meets Quori-Tyler and leaves a happy goodbye message. The players submit their final ratings and get to meet each other face-to-face. "Olivia"/Brandon wins The Circle.

== Results and elimination ==
Color key
The contestant was blocked.
The contestant was an influencer.
The contestant was immune from being blocked.
The player was at risk of being blocked following a twist

Episodes	1	4	6	8	10	12	13	
Influencer(s)	Brandon, Lauren	Myles	Kyle, Quori-Tyler	none	Quori-Tyler, Jordan	Brandon	none	
Brandon "Olivia"	1st	Not published	6th	Not published	2nd	Not published	Winner (Episode 13)	
Kyle	4th	Not published	1st	Not published	5th	Not published	Runner-up (Episode 13)	
Quori-Tyler	Not in The Circle	Not published	2nd	Not published	1st	Not published	Third place (Episode 13)	
Jordan	Not in The Circle		Exempt	Not published	6th	Not published	Fourth place (Episode 13)	
Lauren	2nd	Not published	3rd	Not published	4th	Not published	Fifth place (Episode 13)	
Myles	=5th	1st	4th	Not published	3rd	Not published	Blocked (Episode 13)	
Autumn	Not in The Circle		Exempt	Not published	7th	Blocked (Episode 11)		
Caress "Paul"	7th	Not published	5th	Not published	Blocked (Episode 9)			
Cassie	=5th	Not published	7th	Blocked (Episode 7)				
A.I. Bot "Max"	Not in The Circle	Not published	Left (Episode 5)					
Steffi	3rd	Not published	Blocked (Episode 5)					
Notes	1	2	none	3,4	5	6	7	
Left	none	A.I. Bot "Max"	none					
Blocked	N/A	Steffi; Myles' choice to block	Cassie; Influencers' choice to block	Caress; Caress' choice to sacrifice	Autumn; Influencers' choice to block	Myles; Superinfluencer's choice to block	Lauren; Lowest rated player	Jordan; Fourth highest rated player
Blocked	N/A	Steffi; Myles' choice to block	Cassie; Influencers' choice to block	Caress; Caress' choice to sacrifice	Autumn; Influencers' choice to block	Myles; Superinfluencer's choice to block	Quori-Tyler; Third highest rated player	Kyle; Second highest rated player
Blocked	N/A	Steffi; Myles' choice to block	Cassie; Influencers' choice to block	Caress; Caress' choice to sacrifice	Autumn; Influencers' choice to block	Myles; Superinfluencer's choice to block	Brandon "Olivia"; Highest rated player	

Notes

- ^Note 1: Instead of the influencers blocking one player, they each had the power to pick between two players to join the game. Brandon picked Quori-Tyler and Lauren picked Max.
- ^Note 2: The players were tasked with rating who they thought was most to least human in the game. Myles was voted most human, and had to block the player he thought was the least human in episode 4. It was revealed in episode 5 that he chose to block Steffi, which ultimately revealed Max as the A.I. Bot and he left the game.
- ^Note 3: The players were paired up as 'Ride or Dies' after taking a compatibility test. The 'Ride or Dies' were as follows: Autumn & Lauren, Brandon ("Olivia") & Myles, Caress ("Paul”) & Kyle, and Jordan & Quori-Tyler. The player with the lowest rating, would be blocked from the circle, along with their Ride or Die. One of Caress or Kyle was rated as the lowest player, and was at risk of being blocked from the circle
- ^Note 4: After being "blocked" from the circle, Caress ("Paul") & Kyle had a choice to make. If one of them sacrifices themselves, the other would stay in the game. If both choose to sacrifice themselves or stay in the game, they're both blocked. Caress decided to sacrifice herself, while Kyle decided to stay. Thus, Caress ("Paul") was blocked from The Circle.
- ^Note 5: Whoever was voted as this round's influencer would also have their 'Ride or Die' become a secret influencer as well. Quori-Tyler became the influencer, and Jordan joined her as the secret influencer as a result of being her 'Ride or Die.'
- ^Note 6: The players' ratings were not revealed, instead the highest rated player would become a superinfluencer. Brandon ("Olivia") placed the highest.
- ^Note 7: The players made their final ratings.
