= Starter pack =

Starter pack may refer to:

- Starter pack (meme), an internet meme
- Booster pack, a package of cards or figurines, also called a starter pack
