= Tinx =

American TikToker (born 1990)

- Born: Christina Najjar; September 19, 1990 (age 36); Washington D.C., U.S.
- Education: Stanford University, Parsons School of Design

TikTok information
- Page: @tinx
- Followers: 1.5 million

Christina Najjar (born September 19, 1990), also known as Tinx, is an American influencer. She began posting on TikTok during the COVID-19 pandemic and has dubbed herself "TikTok's older sister" due to her advice about relationships and mental health. She is known for her content around dating advice, celebrity commentary, and "starter packs for rich moms".

== Early life ==
Tinx was born in Washington, D.C., and raised in London, where she attended an all girls school. She moved to California when she was 19 to attend Stanford University, where she studied English literature and creative writing. After graduation, she worked at Gap Inc.'s retail management program. She later enrolled in Parsons School of Design's fashion journalism master's program.

== Career ==
Tinx started her TikTok account in the summer of 2020 during the COVID-19 pandemic. She acquired more than a million followers on the app within a year of starting her account, most of them female. She has been dubbed the "older sister" of TikTok in part due to her honesty about a variety of topics, including romance and mental health. She started gaining followers following her skits about being in your late 20s and celebrity gossip. Her content also includes dating advice and "starter packs for rich moms". On her content about rich moms, she said, "It's half satire, half aspirational...Everybody hates the rich mom, the archetypal anal woman who doesn't eat carbs and has the five-thousand-dollar stroller, but they'll also say, 'Ooh, I go to the same coffee shop as her.' It's the last group of people that you can safely poke fun at." In January 2022, she released her rich mom branded apparel line "Rich Mom Gear".

In 2021, Tinx was nominated for "Breakout Creator" at the 11th Streamy Awards.

Tinx signed with SiriusXM on February 21, 2022, to launch the "It's Me, Tinx" podcast on Stitcher Radio. Beginning on March 16, 2022, Tinx began hosting the weekly radio show "It's Me, Tinx Live" on Sirius XM Stars and the SXM app. The show focuses on Tinx's life and opinions on pop culture and relationships, including recommendations and advice on listener questions.

In April 2022, a series of controversial tweets posted by Tinx resurfaced on a thread in the sub-Reddit, r/tinxsnark. The tweets were posted between 2012 and 2020 and were generally fat-phobic and misogynistic, targeting stars such as Kim Kardashian.

On May 23, 2023, Tinx released her debut book, "The Shift: Change Your Perspective, Not Yourself," which covered topics like dating, self-confidence, friendships, and more through a variety of personal anecdotes.

=== Brands and partnerships ===
Tinx released a "Tinx bowl" in collaboration with Chipotle Mexican Grill in the United States and a smoothie at Erewhon. In April 2022, she played a receptionist as a part of H&M's Hôtel Hennes campaign. In February 2023, she collaborated with Tabasco sauce to release an "Avocado Jalapeño Hot Sauce Dressing." In March 2023, Tinx was featured in Aldo ‘For All That Is You’ campaign.

== Personal life ==
Tinx has a brother.

== Bibliography ==
=== Nonfiction ===
- The Shift: Change Your Perspective, Not Yourself. Simon & Schuster. 2023. ISBN 9781668007648.

Fiction

- Hotter in the Hamptons. Sourcebooks. 2025. ISBN 9781464245374.

Media offices
| Preceded by Michelle Buteau | The Circle host 2026–present | Succeeded by present |
