= Starter pack (meme) =

Internet meme illustrating stereotypes

A starter pack, also referred to as a starterpack or starter kit, is an internet meme meant to describe or illustrate a stereotypical person, place, culture, object, or opinion.

== History ==
The starter pack meme originates back to September 27, 2014 when a Twitter user under the username of ItsLadinaPlis posted the "I Date Black Guys Starter Pack". The name, "starter pack", was originally used for sets of collectibles to start a collection; however, the name "starter kit" for usage of memes dates back to 2011 on use of "crazy cat lady" lolcat memes.

Starter pack memes are now most popular on Reddit on the "r/starterpacks" Subreddit.

== Structure ==
A starter pack is usually an arrangement of 4 or more images on a white background. The title "X starterpack" (where X is replaced with the stereotype) is written in a plain black serif font. The images are generally neutral depictions of clothing or other items the stereotype is generally seen with, but might also show locations, behaviors, or other ideas associated with the stereotype. Sometimes text in plain black serif font describes behavior or gives phrases the stereotype might say.
