= The Circle (American TV series) =

American reality television series

- Genre: Reality competition
- Presented by: Michelle Buteau; Tinx
- Starring: The Circle contestants
- Country of origin: United States
- Original language: English
- No. of seasons: 8
- No. of episodes: 93 (list of episodes)

Production
- Executive producers: Shane Byrne; Tim Harcourt; Stephen Lambert; Daisy Lilley; Susy Price; Chet Fenster; Richard Foster; Toni Ireland
- Production locations: Salford, England, UK (2020–2023); Atlanta, Georgia, United States (2024; 2026-present)
- Running time: 44–63 minutes
- Production companies: Studio Lambert; Omaha Productions (2026-present)

Original release
- Network: Netflix
- Release: January 1, 2020 – October 2, 2024
- Network: Hulu
- Release: November 17, 2026 – present

Related
- The Circle franchise

The Circle (sometimes called The Circle US to differentiate from other international versions) is an American reality competition television series, based on the original British TV series of the same name and produced by Studio Lambert and Motion Content Group.

The series bills itself as a game based around social media and features contestants who live in different apartments in a complex isolated from the outside world and each other. The players only communicate through a social media platform called "The Circle", as they compete to be deemed the most popular in the group. As they communicate through "The Circle", players can portray themselves as whoever they wish. Throughout the course of the competition, players are "blocked" from "The Circle", until only one remains and wins the cash prize. The show's format has been compared to Big Brother and Catfish, as well as to Black Mirror episode "Nosedive" with the concept of ratings.

The series debuted on Netflix in January 2020. Alongside the American version of The Circle, Netflix also launched different versions in France and Brazil, as part of a partnership between Netflix and All3Media. The Netflix iteration of the series ran for seven seasons between 2020 and 2024.

On June 10, 2026, it was announced that the series will be moving to Hulu, due to begin broadcast on November 17.

== Format ==
A number of players move into separate apartments within the same building. While playing, contestants are kept isolated from the outside world and each other, and are not allowed to meet or communicate with each other face-to-face. Instead, they communicate via text on a specially designed social media application that – through photographs, biographies, and text chat – gives them the ability to portray themselves in any way they choose. Players can thus opt to present themselves as a completely different personality to the other players, a tactic otherwise known as catfishing; for example, one male player in the first season presented himself as a female identity, while another female contestant used photos of a woman she felt was more attractive.

Every few days, each contestant must secretly "rate" all of the others from first to last place; their average ratings are then revealed to the entire group from lowest to highest. Normally, the two highest-rated players become "Influencers", while the remaining players are at risk of being eliminated from the game ("blocked") by mutual agreement of the Influencers. Occasionally there may be twists to the blocking process; these include the lowest-rated player(s) being instantly blocked, the identity of the Influencers being a secret, or multiple players being blocked at one time. Blocked players must pack up and leave their apartments immediately, but are given the opportunity to meet and converse with one active player of their choosing in-person. The day after a blocking, a video message is shown to the remaining players to reveal whether the blocked player was real or a "catfish".

Over the first two-thirds of the season, following most blockings, one or more new players will typically enter the game. These players receive immunity for their first blocking, though they participate in ranking the others, after which they become vulnerable to elimination.

During the finale, the contestants rate each other one final time; the highest-rated player wins the game and the cash prize (usually US$100,000, except season 4, which had a prize of US$150,000). Additionally, viewers are able to vote for their favorite player; the player that receives the most votes is declared "Fan Favorite" and receives US$10,000.

== Series overview ==
Season	Players	Host	Prize	Episodes	Originally released			Winner	Runner-up	Fan favorite
Season	Players	Host	Prize	Episodes	First released	Last released	Network	Winner	Runner-up	Fan favorite
1	14	Michelle Buteau	$100,000	12	January 1, 2020	January 15, 2020	Netflix	Joey Sasso	Shubham Goel	Samantha "Sammie" Cimarelli
2	11	Michelle Buteau	$100,000	13	April 14, 2021	May 5, 2021	Netflix	DeLeesa St. Agathe as "Trevor"	Chloe Veitch	Chloe Veitch
3	13	Michelle Buteau	$100,000	13	September 8, 2021	September 29, 2021	Netflix	James Andre Jefferson Jr.	Matthew Pappadia as "Ashley"	Keisha "Kai" Ghost
4	13	Michelle Buteau	$150,000	13	May 4, 2022	May 25, 2022	Netflix	Frank Grimsley	Trevor St. Agathe as "Imani"	Josh "Bru" Brubaker
5	13	Michelle Buteau	$100,000	13	December 28, 2022	January 18, 2023	Netflix	Sam Carmona	Chaz Lawery	—N/a
6	11	Michelle Buteau	$100,000	13	April 17, 2024	May 8, 2024	Netflix	Brandon Baker as "Olivia"	Kyle Fuller	—N/a
7	10	Michelle Buteau	$100,000	13	September 11, 2024	October 2, 2024	Netflix	Nicky and Jojo Scarlotta as "Gianna"	Kevin Fernandez	—N/a
8	TBA	Tinx	TBA	16	November 17, 2026	December 18, 2026	Hulu	TBA	TBA	TBA

== Background ==
=== Concept ===
Logos

Seasons 1–7

Season 8

Tim Harcourt is the creative director of Studio Lambert, which produces the British and American versions of the show. Harcourt wondered what a reality show would look like if the people never met face-to-face. He had also been considering the idea of a bird's-eye view-style documentary of an apartment building, seeing into each of their lives. He began to work on The Circle after hearing that Channel 4 was looking for a reality-show format centered on social media.

The British version of the show premiered in 2018, and was renewed for its second season a few months after the first season ended. After the first season was Channel 4's "youngest profiling" show in six years, according to the British TV industry magazine Broadcast, talks began of international versions.

=== Netflix Iteration (2020 - 2024) ===
On October 8, 2018, Netflix announced its partnership with All3Media to create three international versions of The Circle on Netflix, including the American version. Brandon Reigg, Netflix's Vice Principal of Unscripted Content, stated, "We think the show's combination of modern social media interaction and competition will captivate Netflix members around the world, in multiple languages, and we're delighted to partner with Studio Lambert and Motion to produce these three new local versions."

On March 24, 2020, Netflix renewed The Circle for a second and third season.

The series was renewed for a fourth and fifth season in August 2021. The fourth season premiered on May 4, 2022, and concluded on May 25. The fifth season, titled The Circle Singles, premiered on December 28, 2022.

In October 2021, it was reported that after filming of the fifth season had been completed, the block of apartments used to film most seasons of the entire The Circle franchise were being dismantled and converted back into regular housing. In September 2023, it was reported that a new apartment block had been setup for filming in Atlanta, Georgia, and filming of an unannounced sixth season was underway. In November 2023, Netflix officially announced that The Circle had been renewed for a sixth and seventh season, both of which had already been filmed. The sixth season premiered on April 17, 2024; the seventh season aired on September 11, 2024.

=== Hulu Iteration (2026) ===
On June 10, 2026, it was announced that the series would move to Hulu. This iteration is set to be produced live, and incorporate audience voting into the game (much like the first two seasons of the British version), as well as include celebrity contestants. The Circle will premiere with a new host, Christina Najjar, also known as Tinx on November 17, 2026.

== Production ==
=== The Circle app ===
Each apartment that the players live in is equipped with screens in every room in order for the players to be able to hold conversations with other players as they go about their everyday lives. Each player starts out the game by creating a profile. This includes sharing their age, relationship status, a short bio, and one photo to use as their profile picture. Every day, the players are allowed to share a status update, explaining their thoughts for the day. Sometimes, either through rewards or passing a certain milestone, the players are allowed to upload another photo to their profile. Throughout the competition the Circle app remains the only way players can communicate with each other.

During a typical episode, the Circle prompts participation in a minigame. Tim Harcourt of Studio Lambert says that "some games were really good for bonding them, some were really good for them learning about each other, some were good for testing who's a catfish, some could have been more divisive."

Most episodes also included a rating process as part of the game. Each player would rank others in The Circle, and an average score would determine each player's overall placement. Depending on how high or low their average placement was, the player's ranking would determine whether they became an influencer. Typically, the two players with the top rankings would be Influencers, with the advantage of determining the player being eliminated, or "blocked."

=== Apartment building ===
Seasons 1-5 of The Circle US were shot entirely in the same apartment building in Salford, England, as the other international versions except for the first series of the original UK show. The apartment building is always prepared with twelve furnished and ready-to-use apartments for the players to live in. The building also has an exercise room and a rooftop lounge, which are also outfitted with cameras and television screens. One room in the building, called "the testimonial room," is the room players go to after they are blocked to create their goodbye video to the remaining players. On the outside of the building is a large, lit up circle made of a roughly 82-foot (25-meter) diameter aluminum track with LED lights strung through and around the circle.

Opposite the apartment building was the control room, which was previously part of the Salford University campus that became disused. At any time in the control room, there were between twenty and thirty producers and camera operators working, recording, and sending all the messages from The Circle. In 2019 and 2020 Sean Boyd and the You Are Home team made the contestants apartments available to book via Airbnb in between filming.

Seasons 6-7 were filmed in Atlanta, Georgia.
