= Michelle Buteau =

American actress and writer

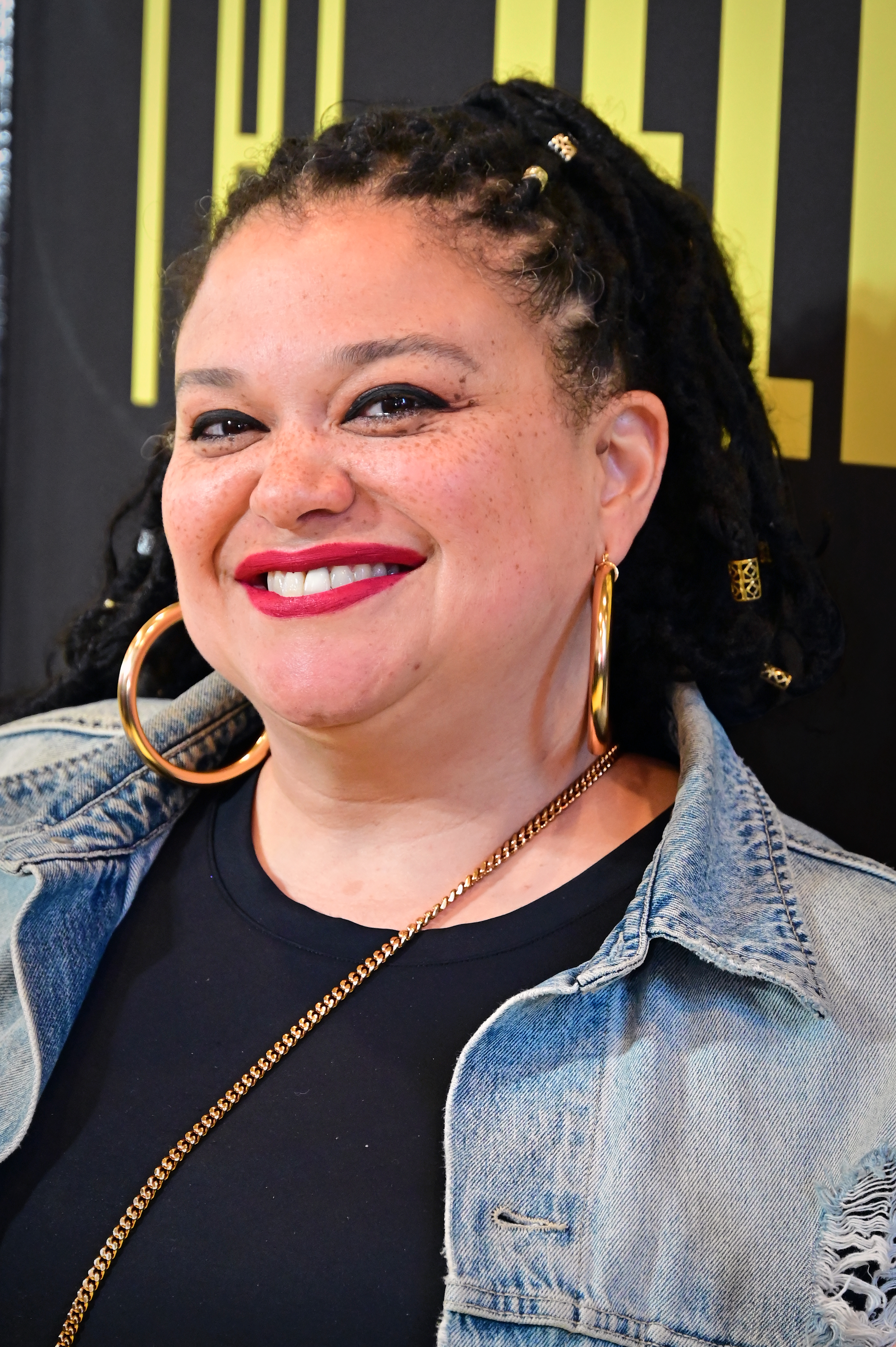
- Buteau in 2026
- Born: July 24, 1977 (age 49); New Jersey, U.S.
- Education: Florida International University
- Occupations: Comedian; actress; producer; podcast host; television host; writer; director
- Years active: 2001–present
- Spouse: Gijs van der Most (m. 2010)
- Children: 2

Michelle Buteau (born July 24, 1977) is an American stand-up comedian, actress, television host, writer, director, producer, and podcast host.

== Early life ==
Buteau was born in New Jersey to a Haitian father and a Jamaican mother. She attended college at Florida International University, where she pursued her dream of becoming an entertainment reporter and studied television production.

== Career ==
After college, Buteau worked as a local TV news producer in New York City, often working the overnight shift. Her co-workers found her funny and suggested that she do standup comedy. It wasn't until three days after the September 11 attacks in 2001 that Buteau performed comedy for the first time, having burned out on covering the news.

After five years as a stand-up comedian, Buteau landed her first television spot on Comedy Central.

In 2017, Buteau was listed as one of ten comedians to watch by Esquire.

In 2018, Buteau started hosting the Late Night Whenever! podcast, which was labeled as "one of the best podcasts of 2018 so far" by Time. Buteau was also part of The Comedy Lineup on Netflix where up-and-coming comedians have 15-minute standup sets.

In 2019, Buteau appeared in the movies Someone Great, Isn't It Romantic, Sell By, and Always Be My Maybe. She also began hosting the WNYC podcast Adulting with co-host Jordan Carlos. That same year, Buteau appeared in two television series: First Wives Club and Tales of the City. In 2020, Buteau started hosting The Circle, a reality TV show on Netflix.

In 2020, Buteau published her first book, a collection of personal essays titled Survival of the Thickest, with Gallery Books, an imprint of Simon & Schuster. A TV adaptation of the memoir premiered in 2023 on Netflix.

Buteau's Michelle Buteau: Welcome to Buteaupia won a 2021 Critics' Choice Television Award for Best Comedy Special.

Buteau was cast with a prominent role in the 2024 film Babes directed by Pamela Adlon. Buteau played the role of Dawn, the main character's best friend. Buteau starred in the animated film Fixed.

== Personal life ==
Buteau married Dutch photographer Gijs van der Most in 2010. Buteau and van der Most have twins who were born in January 2019 via surrogacy.

She is Catholic.

== Filmography ==
Film
Year	Title	Role	Notes
2019	Isn't It Romantic	Martina	
2019	Almost Love	Cammy	
2019	Someone Great	Cynthia	
2019	Always Be My Maybe	Veronica	
2020	Work It	Veronica Ramirez	
2020	Happiest Season	Trudy	
2020	The Stand In	Ingrid	
2022	Marry Me	Melissa	
2022	Moonshot	Captain Tarter	
2022	Crush	Principal Collins	
2022	Clerks III	Lisa	
2024	Babes	Dawn	
2025	Alexander and the Terrible, Horrible, No Good, Very Bad Road Trip	Missy McGill	
2025	Fixed	Molasses	Voice
2026	Spa Weekend	Coco	

Television
Year	Title	Role	Notes
2011	Whitney	Girlfriend	"Pilot"
2012–2013	Key & Peele	Wife, Girlfriend	2 episodes
2013	China, IL	Wendeloquence / Mrs. Falgot	6 episodes
2014	Enlisted	Private Robinson	Recurring
2015	The Jim Gaffigan Show	Amelia	1 episode
2016	Broad City	Host	1 episode
2017	The Tick	Beck	2 episodes
2018	2 Dope Queens	Herself	1 episode
2019	Russian Doll		1 episode
2019–2022	First Wives Club	Bree Washington	Main
2019	Tales of the City	Wrenita Butler	Recurring
2019	Laff Mobb's Laff Tracks	Herself	1 episode
2019–2020	Bless the Harts	Linda / Michelle	Voice; 7 episodes
2020–2024	The Circle	Herself	Host
2020	Michelle Buteau: Welcome to Buteaupia	Herself	Stand-up special
2021	Rick and Morty	The Sperm Queen	Voice; 1 episode
2021–2022	Awkwafina Is Nora from Queens	Margaret	2 episodes
2021	The American Barbecue Showdown	Herself	Host, 8 episodes, Series 2
2021–present	Weekend Getaway With Michelle Buteau	Herself	3 episodes
2022	Zootopia+	Tru-Tru	Voice, Episode: "The Little Rodents of Little Rodentia"
2023–2026	Survival of the Thickest	Mavis Beaumont	Main role Also creator, writer, director and executive producer Based on her memoir of the same name
2024	Barbecue Showdown	Herself	Host, 8 Episodes, season 3
2024	Michelle Buteau: A Buteau-ful Mind at Radio City Music Hall	Herself	Netflix Stand-up Special

Media offices
Preceded by Position created	The Circle host 2020–2024	Succeeded by Tinx
